= 25th Arabian Gulf Cup squads =

The 25th Arabian Gulf Cup was an international football tournament held in Iraq from 6 to 19 January 2023. The eight national teams involved in the tournament were required to register a squad with a minimum of 18 players and a maximum of 23 players, at least three of whom had to be goalkeepers. Only players in these squads were eligible to take part in the tournament.

The age listed for each player is as of 6 January 2023, the first day of the tournament. The numbers of caps and goals listed for each player do not include any matches played after the start of the tournament. The nationality for each club reflects the national association (not the league) to which the club is affiliated. A flag is included for coaches that are of a different nationality than their own national team.

== Group A ==
=== Iraq ===
Coach: (Spain) Jesús Casas

Iraq announced a 35-man preliminary squad on 7 December 2022. Their final 23-man squad was announced on 24 December 2022. Ali Ebadi and Ahmed Farhan were added to the squad on 26 December 2022. Ahmed Yasin withdrew from the squad on 29 December 2022. On 31 December 2022, Ayman Hussein and Amjad Attwan were added to the squad. The final squad was announced on 5 January 2023.

No.	Pos.	Player	Date of birth (age)	Caps	Goals	Club
1	GK	Fahad Talib	21 October 1994 (aged 28)	18	0	(Iraq Football Association) Al-Quwa Al-Jawiya
2	DF	Munaf Younis	16 November 1996 (aged 26)	13	0	(Iraq Football Association) Al-Shorta
3	DF	Zaid Tahseen	29 January 2001 (aged 21)	3	0	(Iraq Football Association) Al-Talaba
4	DF	Mustafa Nadhim (vice-captain)	23 September 1993 (aged 29)	36	3	(Jordan Football Association) Al-Faisaly
5	DF	Ali Faez	9 September 1994 (aged 28)	41	4	(Iraq Football Association) Al-Talaba
6	DF	Alai Ghasem	16 February 2003 (aged 19)	3	0	(Swedish Football Association) IFK Göteborg
7	MF	Hussein Ali	29 November 1996 (aged 26)	45	5	(Tunisian Football Federation) CS Sfaxien
8	MF	Ibrahim Bayesh	1 May 2000 (aged 22)	33	3	(Iraq Football Association) Al-Quwa Al-Jawiya
9	FW	Alaa Abbas	27 July 1997 (aged 25)	26	4	(Iraq Football Association) Al-Zawraa
10	MF	Hasan Abdulkareem	1 January 1999 (aged 24)	10	1	(Iraq Football Association) Al-Zawraa
11	MF	Sherko Karim	25 May 1996 (aged 26)	17	1	(Kuwait Football Association) Kuwait SC
12	GK	Jalal Hassan (captain)	18 May 1991 (aged 31)	66	0	(Iraq Football Association) Al-Zawraa
13	MF	Rewan Amin	8 January 1996 (aged 26)	2	0	Unattached
14	MF	Amjad Attwan	12 March 1997 (aged 25)	66	1	(Qatar Football Association) Al-Shamal
15	DF	Dhurgham Ismail	24 May 1994 (aged 28)	64	4	(Iraq Football Association) Al-Talaba
16	MF	Amir Al-Ammari	27 July 1997 (aged 25)	11	1	(Swedish Football Association) IFK Göteborg
17	DF	Hussein Ammar	18 August 1999 (aged 23)	1	0	(Iraq Football Association) Naft Al Basra
18	FW	Aymen Hussein	22 March 1996 (aged 26)	55	11	(Qatar Football Association) Al-Markhiya
19	MF	Mohammed Ali Abbood	1 October 2000 (aged 22)	10	0	(Iraq Football Association) Al-Quwa Al-Jawiya
20	MF	Hussein Jabbar	9 March 1998 (aged 24)	5	0	(Iraq Football Association) Al-Quwa Al-Jawiya
21	FW	Aso Rostam	1 December 1994 (aged 28)	3	0	(Kuwait Football Association) Al-Salmiya
22	GK	Ahmed Basil	19 August 1996 (aged 26)	1	0	(Iraq Football Association) Al-Shorta
23	MF	Moammel Abdul-Ridha	28 March 2000 (aged 22)	1	0	(Iraq Football Association) Al-Talaba

=== Oman ===
Coach: (Croatia) Branko Ivankovic

Oman announced their final squad on 1 January 2023.

No.	Pos.	Player	Date of birth (age)	Caps	Goals	Club
1	GK	Ibrahim Al-Mukhaini	20 June 1997 (aged 25)	8	0	(Oman Football Association) Al-Nahda
2	DF	Mohammed Al-Musalami	27 April 1990 (aged 32)	92	3	(Oman Football Association) Al-Seeb
3	DF	Fahmi Durbin	10 October 1993 (aged 29)	21	0	(Oman Football Association) Al-Nasr
4	MF	Arshad Al-Alawi	12 April 2000 (aged 22)	21	4	(Kuwait Football Association) Al-Kuwait
5	DF	Juma Al-Habsi	28 January 1996 (aged 26)	20	0	(Oman Football Association) Al-Seeb
6	DF	Ahmed Al-Khamisi	26 November 1991 (aged 31)	18	0	(Oman Football Association) Al-Suwaiq
7	FW	Issam Al-Sabhi	1 May 1997 (aged 25)	16	3	(Oman Football Association) Al-Suwaiq
8	FW	Zahir Al-Aghbari	28 May 1999 (aged 23)	18	0	(Bahrain Football Association) Al-Khaldiya
9	MF	Omar Al-Malki	4 January 1994 (aged 29)	3	1	(Bahrain Football Association) Al-Riffa
10	MF	Jameel Al-Yahmadi	4 January 1994 (aged 29)	39	2	(Qatar Football Association) Al-Markhiya
11	DF	Amjad Al-Harthi	1 January 1994 (aged 29)	20	1	(Oman Football Association) Al-Suwaiq
12	DF	Ahmed Al-Matrooshi	26 May 1997 (aged 25)	1	0	(Oman Football Association) Al-Nahda
13	FW	Ahmed Al-Adwi	1 January 1995 (aged 28)	1	0	(Oman Football Association) Al-Rustaq
14	DF	Ahmed Al-Kaabi	15 September 1996 (aged 26)	12	0	(Oman Football Association) Al-Nahda
15	MF	Musab Al-Mamari	22 January 2000 (aged 22)	1	0	(Oman Football Association) Al-Rustaq
16	DF	Khalid Al-Braiki	3 July 1993 (aged 29)	14	0	(Oman Football Association) Al-Suwaiq
17	FW	Rabia Al-Alawi	31 March 1995 (aged 27)	18	6	(Oman Football Association) Al-Nahda
18	GK	Faiz Al-Rushaidi	19 July 1988 (aged 34)	62	0	(Oman Football Association) Al-Suwaiq
19	DF	Mahmood Al-Mushaifri	14 January 1993 (aged 29)	17	0	(Oman Football Association) Al-Suwaiq
20	FW	Salaah Al-Yahyaei	17 August 1998 (aged 24)	35	6	(Oman Football Association) Al-Seeb
21	MF	Mataz Saleh	28 May 1996 (aged 26)	12	1	(Oman Football Association) Dhofar
22	GK	Ahmed Al-Rawahi	5 May 1994 (aged 28)	5	0	(Oman Football Association) Al-Seeb
23	MF	Harib Al-Saadi (captain)	1 February 1990 (aged 32)	55	0	(Oman Football Association) Al-Suwaiq

=== Saudi Arabia ===
Coach: Saad Al-Shehri

Saudi Arabia announced their squad on 30 December 2022.

No.	Pos.	Player	Date of birth (age)	Caps	Goals	Club
1	GK	Nawaf Al-Aqidi	10 May 2000 (aged 22)	0	0	(Saudi Arabian Football Federation) Al-Nassr
2	DF	Madallah Al-Olayan	25 August 1994 (aged 28)	2	0	(Saudi Arabian Football Federation) Al-Ittihad
3	DF	Ahmed Bamsaud	22 November 1995 (aged 27)	3	0	(Saudi Arabian Football Federation) Al-Ittihad
4	DF	Ziyad Al-Sahafi	3 February 1994 (aged 28)	12	0	(Saudi Arabian Football Federation) Al-Taawoun
5	DF	Qassem Lajami	24 April 1996 (aged 26)	0	0	(Saudi Arabian Football Federation) Al-Fateh
6	MF	Riyadh Sharahili (captain)	28 April 1993 (aged 29)	6	0	(Saudi Arabian Football Federation) Abha
7	MF	Sumayhan Al-Nabit	27 March 1996 (aged 26)	0	0	(Saudi Arabian Football Federation) Al-Taawoun
8	MF	Faisal Al-Ghamdi	13 August 2001 (aged 21)	0	0	(Saudi Arabian Football Federation) Al-Ettifaq
9	FW	Raed Al-Ghamdi	6 May 1994 (aged 28)	0	0	(Saudi Arabian Football Federation) Al-Raed
10	MF	Turki Al-Ammar	23 September 1999 (aged 23)	6	0	(Saudi Arabian Football Federation) Al-Shabab
11	MF	Ahmed Al-Ghamdi	20 September 2001 (aged 21)	0	0	(Saudi Arabian Football Federation) Al-Ettifaq
12	MF	Mohammed Abu Al-Shamat	11 August 2002 (aged 20)	0	0	(Saudi Arabian Football Federation) Al-Qadsiah
13	DF	Hussain Al-Sibyani	24 June 2001 (aged 21)	0	0	(Saudi Arabian Football Federation) Al-Shabab
14	MF	Awad Al-Nashri	15 March 2002 (aged 20)	0	0	(Saudi Arabian Football Federation) Al-Ittihad
15	MF	Hussain Al-Eisa	29 December 2000 (aged 22)	0	0	(Saudi Arabian Football Federation) Al-Wehda
16	FW	Mohammed Maran	15 February 2001 (aged 21)	0	0	(Saudi Arabian Football Federation) Al-Nassr
17	MF	Naif Masoud	8 March 2001 (aged 21)	0	0	(Saudi Arabian Football Federation) Al-Qadsiah
18	MF	Saad Al-Nasser	8 January 2001 (aged 21)	0	0	(Saudi Arabian Football Federation) Al-Taawoun
19	DF	Meshal Al-Sebyani	11 April 2001 (aged 21)	2	0	(Saudi Arabian Football Federation) Al-Faisaly
20	DF	Rayane Hamidou	13 April 2002 (aged 20)	0	0	(Saudi Arabian Football Federation) Al-Ahli
21	GK	Abdulbasit Hawsawi	12 December 2000 (aged 22)	0	0	(Saudi Arabian Football Federation) Damac
22	GK	Mohammed Al-Absi	24 September 2002 (aged 20)	0	0	(Saudi Arabian Football Federation) Al-Shabab
23	MF	Musab Al-Juwayr	20 June 2003 (aged 19)	0	0	(Saudi Arabian Football Federation) Al-Hilal

=== Yemen ===
Coach: (Czech Republic) Miroslav Soukup

Yemen announced their squad on 31 December 2022. Yemen announced their final squad on 6 January 2023.

No.	Pos.	Player	Date of birth (age)	Caps	Goals	Club
1	GK	Mohamed Aman	14 April 1997 (aged 25)	3	0	(Yemen Football Association) Al-Shaab Hadramaut
2	DF	Hamza Al-Rimi	12 February 2002 (aged 20)	3	0	(Libyan Football Federation) Al Tahaddy SC
3	DF	Haroune Al-Zubaidi	15 October 1999 (aged 23)	0	0	(Yemen Football Association) Al-Wehda SCC
4	DF	Mudir Al-Radaei (captain)	30 November 1989 (aged 33)	59	1	(Yemen Football Association) Al-Ahli Club Sanaa
5	DF	Akram Al-Bahri	1 April 1996 (aged 26)	0	0	(Yemen Football Association) Al-Wehda SCC
6	DF	Amrou Lotf	12 February 1999 (aged 23)	0	0	(Yemen Football Association) Al-Wehda SC
7	FW	Ahmed Al-Sarori	9 August 1998 (aged 24)	42	2	(Royal Moroccan Football Federation) Chabab Mohammédia
8	MF	Anis Al-Maari	9 January 2000 (aged 22)	1	0	(Yemen Football Association) Al-Shaab Hadramaut
9	FW	Omar Al-Dahi	15 December 1999 (aged 23)	15	2	(Egyptian Football Association) Aswan
10	MF	Nasser Al-Gahwashi	24 May 1999 (aged 23)	18	1	(Iraq Football Association) Naft Al-Wasat
11	MF	Abdulwasea Al-Matari	4 July 1994 (aged 28)	50	8	(Oman Football Association) Al-Nasr Club
12	FW	Ahmed Maher	24 January 2002 (aged 20)	8	0	(Egyptian Football Association) Baladeyet El Mahalla SC
13	MF	Omar Shared	10 March 1997 (aged 25)	2	0	(Yemen Football Association) Shamsan Club
14	MF	Mohamed Bahmeed	1 January 1997 (aged 26)	0	0	(Yemen Football Association) Tadamn Hadramaut
15	MF	Mohamed Al-Tairi	4 February 2000 (aged 22)	3	0	(Yemen Football Association) Al-Wehda SCC
16	DF	Ahmed Al-Wajih	17 March 2002 (aged 20)	5	0	(Yemen Football Association) Al-Shaab Hadramaut
17	DF	Emad Al-Jadima	11 March 2003 (aged 19)	1	0	(Iraq Football Association) Samarra
18	MF	Mohammed Al-Dahi	3 April 1996 (aged 26)	3	0	(Iraq Football Association) Samarra
19	FW	Ali Al-Omri	8 June 2001 (aged 21)	0	0	(United States Soccer Federation) Lackawana Buffalo
20	MF	Hamza Hanash	1 January 1995 (aged 28)	0	0	(Yemen Football Association) Al-Ahli Club Sanaa
21	DF	Jarallah Al-Zaghari	1 January 1997 (aged 26)	0	0	(Yemen Football Association) Shaab Ibb SCC
22	GK	Salem Al-Harsh	7 October 1998 (aged 24)	5	0	(Yemen Football Association) Al-Wehda SC
23	GK	Ali Fadhl	27 December 2000 (aged 22)	0	0	(Yemen Football Association) Tadamn Hadramaut

== Group B ==
=== Bahrain ===
Coach: (Portugal) Hélio Sousa

Bahrain announced their squad on 26 December 2022.

No.	Pos.	Player	Date of birth (age)	Caps	Goals	Club
1	GK	Omar Salem	26 May 1995 (aged 27)	0	0	(Bahrain Football Association) Budaiya
2	DF	Amine Bennadi	9 May 1993 (aged 29)	10	0	(Bahrain Football Association) Al-Muharraq
3	DF	Waleed Al Hayam	3 February 1991 (aged 31)	92	0	(Bahrain Football Association) Al-Muharraq
4	FW	Sayed Dhiya Saeed	17 July 1992 (aged 30)	105	7	(Bahrain Football Association) Al-Khaldiya
5	DF	Hamad Al-Shamsan	29 September 1997 (aged 25)	20	0	(Bahrain Football Association) Al-Riffa
6	MF	Hamza Abdulla	23 June 1999 (aged 23)	0	0	(Bahrain Football Association) East Riffa
7	FW	Ali Madan	30 November 1995 (aged 27)	68	11	(United Arab Emirates Football Association) Ajman
8	MF	Mohamed Marhoon	12 February 1998 (aged 24)	43	12	(Bahrain Football Association) Al-Riffa
9	FW	Abdulla Yusuf	12 June 1993 (aged 29)	70	9	(Football Association of Indonesia) Persija Jakarta
10	MF	Abdulwahab Al-Malood	7 June 1990 (aged 32)	75	5	(Bahrain Football Association) Al-Muharraq
11	MF	Ebrahim Al-Khatal	19 September 2000 (aged 22)	8	2	(Bahrain Football Association) Manama
12	MF	Mahdi Abdullatif	15 February 1993 (aged 29)	8	0	(Bahrain Football Association) Manama
13	MF	Ahmed Al-Sherooqi	22 May 2000 (aged 22)	0	0	(Bahrain Football Association) Al-Muharraq
14	MF	Ali Haram	11 December 1988 (aged 34)	40	5	(Bahrain Football Association) Al-Riffa
15	MF	Jasim Al-Shaikh	1 February 1996 (aged 26)	51	3	(Bahrain Football Association) Al-Riffa
16	DF	Sayed Redha Isa	7 August 1994 (aged 28)	57	3	(Bahrain Football Association) Al-Riffa
17	DF	Ahmed Bughammar	30 December 1997 (aged 25)	24	1	(Bahrain Football Association) Al-Khaldiya
18	DF	Mohammed Adel	20 September 1996 (aged 26)	20	0	(Bahrain Football Association) Al-Khaldiya
19	MF	Kamil Al-Aswad	8 April 1994 (aged 28)	84	11	(Bahrain Football Association) Al-Riffa
20	FW	Mahdi Al-Humaidan	19 May 1993 (aged 29)	40	4	(Bahrain Football Association) Al-Khaldiya
21	GK	Sayed Mohammed Jaffer (captain)	25 August 1985 (aged 37)	145	0	(Bahrain Football Association) Al-Muharraq
22	GK	Ebrahim Lutfalla	24 September 1992 (aged 30)	7	0	(Bahrain Football Association) Al-Ahli
23	DF	Abdulla Al-Khalasi	2 September 2003 (aged 19)	0	0	(Bahrain Football Association) Al-Muharraq

=== Kuwait ===
Coach: (Portugal) Rui Bento

Kuwait announced their preliminary squad on 22 December 2022. On 1 January 2023, Kuwait announced their final squad.

No.	Pos.	Player	Date of birth (age)	Caps	Goals	Club
1	GK	Bader Al-Saanoun	24 November 1996 (aged 26)	0	0	(Kuwait Football Association) Al-Jahra
2	DF	Hassan Hamdan	1 September 2000 (aged 22)	2	0	(Kuwait Football Association) Al-Arabi
3	DF	Meshari Ghanam	28 August 1997 (aged 25)	3	0	(Kuwait Football Association) Kuwait SC
4	DF	Khalid El Ebrahim (captain)	28 August 1992 (aged 30)	24	1	(Kuwait Football Association) Al-Qadsia
5	DF	Fahad Al Hajeri	10 November 1991 (aged 31)	68	5	(Kuwait Football Association) Kuwait SC
6	MF	Sultan Al Enezi	29 September 1992 (aged 30)	39	0	(Kuwait Football Association) Al-Arabi
7	MF	Bader Al-Fadhel	22 April 1997 (aged 25)	3	0	(Kuwait Football Association) Al-Arabi
8	MF	Ahmed Al-Dhefiri	9 January 1992 (aged 30)	38	2	(Kuwait Football Association) Kuwait SC
9	FW	Ibrahim Kameel	10 June 2002 (aged 20)	4	0	(Kuwait Football Association) Kuwait SC
10	MF	Faisal Zayid	9 October 1991 (aged 31)	46	6	(Kuwait Football Association) Kuwait SC
11	FW	Eid Al-Rashidi	25 May 1999 (aged 23)	20	1	(Kuwait Football Association) Al-Qadsia
12	MF	Abdullah Ghanem	12 February 1997 (aged 25)	0	0	(Kuwait Football Association) Kazma
13	DF	Bader Jamal	10 December 1996 (aged 26)	2	0	(Kuwait Football Association) Al-Salmiya
14	FW	Mohammad Bajeyah	15 March 2001 (aged 21)	2	1	(Kuwait Football Association) Al-Jahra
15	DF	Hamad Al-Qallaf	4 December 1999 (aged 23)	14	0	(Kuwait Football Association) Al-Salmiya
16	FW	Mobarak Al-Faneeni	21 January 2000 (aged 22)	27	4	(Kuwait Football Association) Al-Salmiya
17	MF	Ali Khalaf	16 January 1995 (aged 27)	7	0	(Kuwait Football Association) Al-Arabi
18	MF	Fawaz Al-Otaibi	21 February 1997 (aged 25)	19	1	(Kuwait Football Association) Al-Salmiya
19	DF	Mahdi Dashti	26 October 2001 (aged 21)	6	0	(Kuwait Football Association) Al-Salmiya
20	FW	Shabaib Al-Khaldi	11 August 1998 (aged 24)	18	3	(Kuwait Football Association) Kazma
21	DF	Mohammed Al-Nassar	24 May 1996 (aged 26)	0	0	(Kuwait Football Association) Kazma
22	GK	Sulaiman Abdulghafour	26 February 1991 (aged 31)	31	0	(Kuwait Football Association) Al-Arabi
23	GK	Dhari Al-Otaibi	31 March 2002 (aged 20)	0	0	(Kuwait Football Association) Kuwait SC

=== Qatar ===
Coach: (Portugal) Bruno Pinheiro

Qatar announced their preliminary squad on 12 December 2022. On 20 December 2022, Ahmed Alaaeldin was added to the squad. On 3 January, the final squad was announced.

No.	Pos.	Player	Date of birth (age)	Caps	Goals	Club
1	GK	Shehab Ellethy	18 April 2000 (aged 22)	0	0	(Qatar Football Association) Al-Duhail
2	MF	Hazem Shehata	2 February 1998 (aged 24)	1	0	(Qatar Football Association) Al-Wakrah
3	DF	Diyab Taha	15 May 2001 (aged 21)	0	0	(Qatar Football Association) Al-Duhail
4	DF	Mohammed Aiash	27 February 2001 (aged 21)	0	0	(Qatar Football Association) Al-Duhail
5	DF	Tarek Salman	5 December 1997 (aged 25)	59	0	(Qatar Football Association) Al-Sadd
6	MF	Naif Al-Hadhrami	18 July 2001 (aged 21)	1	0	(Qatar Football Association) Al-Rayyan
7	FW	Ahmed Alaaeldin	31 January 1993 (aged 29)	48	2	(Qatar Football Association) Al-Gharafa
8	MF	Ali Assadalla	19 January 1993 (aged 29)	60	12	(Qatar Football Association) Al-Sadd
9	MF	Tameem Al-Abdullah	5 October 2002 (aged 20)	0	0	(Qatar Football Association) Al-Rayyan
10	DF	Mohammed Waad	18 September 1999 (aged 23)	23	0	(Qatar Football Association) Al-Sadd
11	FW	Amro Surag	8 April 1998 (aged 24)	0	0	(Qatar Football Association) Al-Gharafa
12	FW	Yusuf Abdurisag	6 August 1999 (aged 23)	13	1	(Qatar Football Association) Al-Sadd
13	MF	Mostafa Meshaal	28 March 2001 (aged 21)	1	0	(Qatar Football Association) Al-Sadd
14	DF	Homam Ahmed	25 August 1999 (aged 23)	32	2	(Qatar Football Association) Al-Gharafa
15	DF	Jassem Gaber	20 February 2002 (aged 20)	0	0	(Qatar Football Association) Al-Arabi
16	MF	Hashim Ali	17 August 2000 (aged 22)	2	0	(Qatar Football Association) Al-Sadd
17	DF	Ismaeel Mohammad (captain)	5 April 1990 (aged 32)	72	4	(Qatar Football Association) Al-Duhail
18	FW	Khalid Muneer	24 February 1998 (aged 24)	3	1	(Qatar Football Association) Al-Wakrah
19	MF	Ahmed Fadhel	7 April 1993 (aged 29)	0	0	(Qatar Football Association) Al-Wakrah
20	MF	Salem Al-Hajri	10 April 1996 (aged 26)	22	0	(Qatar Football Association) Al-Sadd
21	GK	Mahmud Abunada	5 February 2000 (aged 22)	0	0	(Qatar Football Association) Al-Arabi
22	GK	Meshaal Barsham	14 February 1998 (aged 24)	22	0	(Qatar Football Association) Al-Sadd
23	MF	Assim Madibo	22 October 1996 (aged 26)	45	0	(Qatar Football Association) Al-Duhail

=== United Arab Emirates ===
Coach: (Argentina) Rodolfo Arruabarrena

United Arab Emirates announced their preliminary squad on 23 December 2022. The final squad was announced on 25 December 2022. On 26 December, Shahin Abdulrahman withdrew from the squad due to injury. On 27 December, Tahnoon Al-Zaabi withdrew from the squad due to injury as well.

No.	Pos.	Player	Date of birth (age)	Caps	Goals	Club
1	GK	Ali Khasif	9 June 1987 (aged 35)	69	0	(United Arab Emirates Football Association) Al-Jazira
2	DF	Abdusalam Mohammed	19 June 1992 (aged 30)	1	0	(United Arab Emirates Football Association) Kalba
3	DF	Walid Abbas (captain)	11 June 1985 (aged 37)	109	6	(United Arab Emirates Football Association) Shabab Al-Ahli
4	DF	Khalid Al-Hashemi	18 March 1997 (aged 25)	4	0	(United Arab Emirates Football Association) Baniyas
5	MF	Mohammed Abdulbasit	19 October 1995 (aged 27)	1	0	(United Arab Emirates Football Association) Sharjah
6	MF	Majid Rashid	16 May 2000 (aged 22)	5	0	(United Arab Emirates Football Association) Sharjah
7	FW	Ali Saleh	22 January 2000 (aged 22)	25	3	(United Arab Emirates Football Association) Al-Wasl
8	MF	Majed Hassan	1 August 1992 (aged 30)	67	1	(United Arab Emirates Football Association) Sharjah
9	FW	Harib Al-Maazmi	26 November 2002 (aged 20)	14	1	(United Arab Emirates Football Association) Shabab Al-Ahli
10	MF	Fábio Lima	30 June 1993 (aged 29)	18	8	(United Arab Emirates Football Association) Al-Wasl
11	FW	Caio Canedo	9 August 1990 (aged 32)	27	7	(United Arab Emirates Football Association) Al-Ain
12	DF	Khalifa Al-Hammadi	6 November 1998 (aged 24)	24	0	(United Arab Emirates Football Association) Al-Jazira
13	MF	Falah Waleed	13 September 1998 (aged 24)	1	0	(United Arab Emirates Football Association) Khor Fakkan
14	FW	Yahya Al Ghassani	18 April 1998 (aged 24)	5	1	(United Arab Emirates Football Association) Shabab Al-Ahli
15	FW	Sebastián Tagliabúe	22 February 1985 (aged 37)	16	4	(United Arab Emirates Football Association) Al Wahda
16	DF	Bader Nasser	16 September 2001 (aged 21)	1	0	(United Arab Emirates Football Association) Shabab Al-Ahli
17	GK	Khalid Eisa	15 September 1989 (aged 33)	62	0	(United Arab Emirates Football Association) Al-Ain
18	MF	Abdullah Ramadan	7 March 1998 (aged 24)	33	0	(United Arab Emirates Football Association) Al-Jazira
19	DF	Khaled Ibrahim	17 January 1997 (aged 25)	6	0	(United Arab Emirates Football Association) Sharjah
20	DF	Ahmed Jamil	16 January 1999 (aged 23)	5	0	(United Arab Emirates Football Association) Shabab Al-Ahli
21	MF	Khaled Al-Balochi	22 March 1999 (aged 23)	2	0	(United Arab Emirates Football Association) Al-Ain
22	GK	Khaled Al-Senani	4 October 1989 (aged 33)	0	0	(United Arab Emirates Football Association) Al-Wasl
23	DF	Abdulaziz Haikal	10 September 1990 (aged 32)	47	1	(United Arab Emirates Football Association) Shabab Al-Ahli
