= 25th Arabian Gulf Cup Group B =

Football tournament group stage

The Group B of the 25th Arabian Gulf Cup was one of the two groups of competing nations in the 25th Arabian Gulf Cup. It consisted of defending champions Bahrain, Kuwait, Qatar and the United Arab Emirates. The matches took place from 7 to 13 January 2023. The top two teams, Bahrain and Qatar, advanced to the semi-finals.

== Teams ==
| Team | Appearance | Previous best performance | FIFA Rankings (October 2022) | | | |
|---|---|---|---|---|---|---|
| Team | Appearance | Previous best performance | Bahrain (holders) | 25th | Winners (2019) | 85 |
| Kuwait | 25th | Winners (1970, 1972, 1974, 1976, 1982, 1986, 1990, 1996, 1998, 2010) | 149 | | | |
| Qatar | 25th | Winners (1992, 2004, 2014) | 50 | | | |
| United Arab Emirates | 24th | Winners (2007, 2013) | 70 | | | |

== Standings ==
| Pos | Team | Pld | W | D | L | GF | GA | GD | Pts | Qualification |
|---|---|---|---|---|---|---|---|---|---|---|
| 1 | Bahrain | 3 | 2 | 1 | 0 | 5 | 3 | +2 | 7 | Advance to knockout stage |
| 2 | Qatar | 3 | 1 | 1 | 1 | 4 | 3 | +1 | 4 | Advance to knockout stage |
| 3 | Kuwait | 3 | 1 | 1 | 1 | 2 | 3 | −1 | 4 | |
| 4 | United Arab Emirates | 3 | 0 | 1 | 2 | 2 | 4 | −2 | 1 | |

Source: AGCFF
Rules for classification: Group stage tiebreakers

== Matches ==
=== Bahrain vs United Arab Emirates ===
7 January 2023
16:15 UTC+3

| Bahrain | 2–1 | United Arab Emirates |
|---|---|---|
| Al-Aswad 60'; Al-Shaikh 77' | Report | Tagliabúe 90+2' |

Al-Minaa Olympic Stadium, Basra
Referee: Ahmed Al-Kaf (Oman)

| Bahrain | United Arab Emirates |

| GK | 21 | Sayed Mohammed Jaffer (c) |
| RB | 16 | Sayed Isa | (yellow card) 47' | (substituted off) 67' |
| CB | 2 | Amine Bennadi |
| CB | 3 | Waleed Al Hayam |
| LB | 4 | Sayed Dhiya Saeed |
| CM | 15 | Jasim Al-Shaikh |
| CM | 14 | Ali Haram | (yellow card) 34' |
| RW | 7 | Ali Madan | | (substituted off) 84' |
| AM | 19 | Kamil Al-Aswad |
| LW | 20 | Mahdi Al-Humaidan |
| CF | 9 | Abdulla Yusuf Helal |
Substitutions:
| DF | 18 | Mohammed Adel | | (substituted on) 67' |
| MF | 8 | Mohamed Marhoon | | (substituted on) 84' |
Manager:
(Portugal) Hélio Sousa

| GK | 17 | Khalid Eisa |
| RB | 20 | Ahmed Abdullah Jamil |
| CB | 12 | Khalifa Al Hammadi |
| CB | 19 | Khaled Ibrahim | (substituted off) 80' |
| LB | 3 | Walid Abbas (c) |
| RM | 9 | Harib Suhail |
| CM | 8 | Majed Hassan | (substituted off) 81' |
| CM | 6 | Majid Rashid | (substituted off) 66' |
| CM | 18 | Abdullah Ramadan |
| LM | 7 | Ali Saleh | (substituted off) 81' |
| CF | 11 | Caio Canedo |
Substitutions:
| FW | 15 | Sebastián Tagliabúe | (substituted on) 66' |
| DF | 16 | Bader Abdelaziz | (substituted on) 80' |
| MF | 5 | Mohammed Abdulbasit | (substituted on) 81' |
| FW | 14 | Yahya Al Ghassani | (substituted on) 81' |
Manager:
(Argentina) Rodolfo Arruabarrena

Man of the Match:
Kamil Al-Aswad (Bahrain)

Assistant referees:
Rashad Al-Hakmani (Oman)
Rashid Abdi (Oman)
Fourth official:
Ali Sabah (Iraq)
Video assistant referee:
Rédouane Jiyed (Morocco)
Assistant video assistant referee:
Abdullah Al-Shehri (Saudi Arabia)

=== Kuwait vs Qatar ===
7 January 2023
19:15 UTC+3

| Kuwait | 0–2 | Qatar |
|---|---|---|
| | Report | Surag 21'; Alaaeldin 37' (pen.) |

Al-Minaa Olympic Stadium, Basra
Referee: Ma Ning (China)

| Kuwait | Qatar |

| GK | 22 | Sulaiman Abdulghafour |
| RB | 2 | Hassan Hamdan |
| CB | 3 | Meshari Ghanam |
| CB | 19 | Mahdi Dashti |
| LB | 12 | Abdullah Ghanem | (yellow card) 75' | (substituted off) 78' |
| CM | 4 | Khalid El Ebrahim (c) |
| CM | 6 | Sultan Al Enezi |
| RW | 11 | Eid Al Rashidi |
| AM | 8 | Ahmed Al-Dhefiri | | (substituted off) 64' |
| LW | 16 | Mobarak Al-Faneeni | | (substituted off) 74' |
| CF | 9 | Ibrahim Kameel | | (substituted off) 46' |
Substitutions:
| FW | 20 | Shabaib Al-Khaldi | | (substituted on) 46' |
| MF | 10 | Faisal Zayid | | (substituted on) 64' |
| FW | 14 | Mohammad Bajeyah | | (substituted on) 74' |
| MF | 18 | Fawaz Al-Otaibi | | (substituted on) 78' |
Manager:
(Portugal) Rui Bento

| GK | 22 | Meshaal Barsham |
| RB | 17 | Ismaeel Mohammad (c) |
| CB | 15 | Jassem Gaber |
| CB | 5 | Tarek Salman |
| LB | 14 | Homam Ahmed | (yellow card) 57' |
| CM | 8 | Ali Assadalla | | (substituted off) 76' |
| CM | 23 | Assim Madibo |
| RW | 7 | Ahmed Alaaeldin | | (substituted off) 76' |
| AM | 10 | Mohammed Waad | | (substituted off) 85' |
| LW | 11 | Amro Surag | | (substituted off) 85' |
| CF | 9 | Tameem Al-Abdullah | | (substituted off) 70' |
Substitutions:
| MF | 16 | Hashim Ali | | (substituted on) 70' |
| FW | 12 | Yusuf Abdurisag | | (substituted on) 76' |
| MF | 13 | Mostafa Meshaal | | (substituted on) 76' |
| FW | 18 | Khalid Muneer | | (substituted on) 85' |
| MF | 19 | Ahmed Fadhel | | (substituted on) 85' |
Manager:
(Portugal) Bruno Pinheiro

Man of the Match:
Amro Surag (Qatar)

Assistant referees:
Zhou Fei (China)
Zhang Cheng (China)
Fourth official:
Shukri Al-Hanfoush (Saudi Arabia)
Video assistant referee:
Fu Ming (China)
Assistant video assistant referee:
Jérémie Pignard (France)

=== United Arab Emirates vs Kuwait ===
10 January 2023
16:15 UTC+3

| United Arab Emirates | 0–1 | Kuwait |
|---|---|---|
| | Report | Al-Dhefiri 90+3' |

Al-Minaa Olympic Stadium, Basra
Referee: Shukri Al-Hanfoush (Saudi Arabia)

| United Arab Emirates | Kuwait |

| GK | 17 | Khalid Eisa |
| RB | 19 | Khaled Ibrahim |
| CB | 12 | Khalifa Al Hammadi | (yellow card) 70' |
| CB | 3 | Walid Abbas (c) |
| LB | 16 | Bader Abdelaziz | | (substituted off) 78' |
| CM | 5 | Mohammed Abdulbasit | | (substituted off) 78' |
| CM | 18 | Abdullah Ramadan | (yellow card) 22' |
| RW | 11 | Caio Canedo | | (substituted off) 78' |
| AM | 6 | Majid Rashid | | (substituted off) 62' |
| LW | 9 | Harib Suhail |
| CF | 15 | Sebastián Tagliabúe | (yellow card) 47' |
Substitutions:
| FW | 7 | Ali Saleh | | (substituted on) 62' |
| FW | 14 | Yahya Al Ghassani | | (substituted on) 78' |
| DF | 20 | Ahmed Jamil | | (substituted on) 78' |
| DF | 13 | Falah Waleed | | (substituted on) 78' |
Manager:
(Argentina) Rodolfo Arruabarrena

| GK | 22 | Sulaiman Abdulghafour |
| RB | 19 | Mahdi Dashti | | (substituted off) 72' |
| CB | 4 | Khalid El Ebrahim (c) |
| CB | 2 | Hassan Hamdan |
| LB | 3 | Meshari Ghanam | | (substituted off) 61' |
| CM | 6 | Sultan Al Enezi | (yellow card) 90+4' |
| CM | 5 | Fahad Al Hajeri |
| RW | 11 | Eid Al Rashidi | | (substituted off) 86' |
| AM | 10 | Faisal Zayid | | (substituted off) 86' |
| LW | 16 | Mobarak Al-Faneeni | | (substituted off) 86' |
| CF | 20 | Shabaib Al-Khaldi |
Substitutions:
| DF | 15 | Hamad Al-Qallaf | | (substituted on) 61' |
| MF | 7 | Bader Al-Fadhel | | (substituted on) 72' |
| FW | 9 | Ibrahim Kameel | | (substituted on) 86' |
| DF | 8 | Ahmed Al-Dhefiri | | (substituted on) 86' |
| FW | 14 | Mohammad Bajeyah | | (substituted on) 86' |
Manager:
(Portugal) Rui Bento

Man of the Match:
Mobarak Al-Faneeni (Kuwait)

Assistant referees:
Yasser Al-Sultan (Saudi Arabia)
Faisal Al-Qahtani (Saudi Arabia)
Fourth official:
István Kovács (Romania)
Video assistant referee:
Abdullah Al-Shehri (Saudi Arabia)
Assistant video assistant referee:
Rédouane Jiyed (Morocco)

=== Qatar vs Bahrain ===
10 January 2023
19:15 UTC+3

| Qatar | 1–2 | Bahrain |
|---|---|---|
| Alaaeldin 34' | Report | Waad 72' (o.g.); Yusuf 89' (pen.) |

Al-Minaa Olympic Stadium, Basra
Referee: Ilgiz Tantashev (Uzbekistan)

| Qatar | Bahrain |

| GK | 22 | Meshaal Barsham |
| RB | 17 | Ismaeel Mohammad (c) |
| CB | 15 | Jassem Gaber |
| CB | 5 | Tarek Salman |
| LB | 14 | Homam Ahmed |
| CM | 10 | Mohammed Waad | (yellow card) 86' |
| CM | 23 | Assim Madibo |
| RW | 9 | Tameem Al-Abdullah | | (substituted off) 79' |
| AM | 8 | Ali Assadalla | | (substituted off) 90' |
| LW | 11 | Amro Surag | | (substituted off) 79' |
| CF | 7 | Ahmed Alaaeldin | | (substituted off) 81' |
Substitutions:
| FW | 18 | Khalid Muneer | | (substituted on) 79' |
| MF | 16 | Hashim Ali | | (substituted on) 79' |
| FW | 12 | Yusuf Abdurisag | | (substituted on) 81' |
| MF | 13 | Mostafa Meshaal | | (substituted on) 90' |
Manager:
(Portugal) Bruno Pinheiro

| GK | 22 | Ebrahim Lutfalla | (yellow card) 90+7' |
| RB | 18 | Mohammed Adel | | (substituted off) 78' |
| CB | 2 | Amine Bennadi |
| CB | 3 | Waleed Al Hayam (c) |
| LB | 23 | Abdullah Al-Khalasi | | (substituted off) 60' |
| CM | 15 | Jasim Al-Shaikh |
| CM | 12 | Mahdi Abdullatif | | (substituted off) 60' |
| RW | 7 | Ali Madan | | (substituted off) 60' |
| AM | 10 | Abdulwahab Al-Malood | | (substituted off) 90+3' |
| LW | 8 | Mohamed Marhoon |
| CF | 9 | Abdulla Yusuf Helal |
Substitutions:
| FW | 19 | Kamil Al-Aswad | | (substituted on) 60' |
| FW | 4 | Sayed Dhiya Saeed | | (substituted on) 60' |
| FW | 13 | Ahmed Al-Sherooqi | | (substituted on) 60' |
| FW | 20 | Mahdi Al-Humaidan | | (substituted on) 78' |
| MF | 14 | Ali Haram | | (substituted on) 90+3' |
Manager:
(Portugal) Hélio Sousa

Man of the Match:
Abdulla Yusuf Helal (Bahrain)

Assistant referees:
Sanjar Shayusupov (Uzbekistan)
Alisher Usmanov (Uzbekistan)
Fourth official:
Ali Sabah (Iraq)
Video assistant referee:
Jérémie Pignard (France)
Assistant video assistant referee:
Fu Ming (China)

=== Bahrain vs Kuwait ===
13 January 2023
18:00 UTC+3

| Bahrain | 1–1 | Kuwait |
|---|---|---|
| Al-Humaidan 26' | Report | Al-Khaldi 45' |

Basra International Stadium, Basra
Referee: István Kovács (Romania)

| Bahrain | Kuwait |

| GK | 21 | Sayed Mohammed Jaffer (c) |
| RB | 2 | Amine Bennadi | | (substituted off) 86' |
| CB | 5 | Hamad Al-Shamsan | (yellow card) 10' | (substituted off) 74' |
| CB | 6 | Hamza Abdullah Idris | | (substituted off) 65' |
| LB | 17 | Ahmed Bughammar |
| RM | 20 | Mahdi Al-Humaidan |
| CM | 14 | Ali Haram |
| CM | 12 | Mahdi Abdullatif | (yellow card) 90+2' |
| LM | 4 | Sayed Dhiya Saeed |
| CF | 19 | Kamil Al-Aswad | (yellow card) 16' | (substituted off) 74' |
| CF | 8 | Mohamed Marhoon | (yellow card) 44' | (substituted off) 65' |
Substitutions:
| FW | 7 | Ali Madan | | (substituted on) 65' |
| FW | 9 | Yusuf Helal | | (substituted on) 65' |
| DF | 3 | Waleed Al Hayam | | (substituted on) 74' |
| MF | 10 | Abdulwahab Al-Malood | | (substituted on) 74' |
| DF | 16 | Sayed Isa | | (substituted on) 86' |
Manager:
(Portugal) Hélio Sousa

| GK | 22 | Sulaiman Abdulghafour |
| RB | 5 | Fahad Al Hajeri |
| CB | 4 | Khalid El Ebrahim (c) |
| CB | 2 | Hassan Hamdan |
| LB | 15 | Hamad Al-Qallaf | (yellow card) 22' (yellow-red card) 68' |
| CM | 7 | Bader Al-Fadhel | | (substituted off) 46' |
| CM | 6 | Sultan Al Enezi | | (substituted off) 90+2' |
| RW | 11 | Eid Al Rashidi | | (substituted off) 86' |
| AM | 10 | Faisal Zayid | | (substituted off) 46' |
| LW | 16 | Mobarak Al-Faneeni | | (substituted off) 76' |
| CF | 20 | Shabaib Al-Khaldi |
Substitutions:
| DF | 8 | Ahmed Al-Dhefiri | | (substituted on) 46' |
| DF | 19 | Mahdi Dashti | | (substituted on) 46' |
| MF | 17 | Ali Khalaf | | (substituted on) 76' |
| FW | 11 | Eid Al Rashidi | | (substituted on) 86' |
| FW | 9 | Ibrahim Kameel | | (substituted on) 90+2' |
Manager:
(Portugal) Rui Bento

Man of the Match:
Mahdi Al-Humaidan (Bahrain)

Assistant referees:
Vasile Florin Marinescu (Romania)
Mihai Ovidiu Artene (Romania)
Fourth official:
Ahmed Al-Kaf (Oman)
Video assistant referee:
Jérémie Pignard (France)

=== United Arab Emirates vs Qatar ===
13 January 2023
18:00 UTC+3

| United Arab Emirates | 1–1 | Qatar |
|---|---|---|
| Lima 77' | Report | Al-Abdullah 88' |

Al-Minaa Olympic Stadium, Basra
Referee: Ali Sabah (Iraq)

| United Arab Emirates | Qatar |

| GK | 17 | Khalid Eisa |
| RB | 20 | Ahmed Abdullah Jamil | | (substituted off) 90+2' |
| CB | 12 | Khalifa Al Hammadi | (yellow card) 45' | (substituted off) 79' |
| CB | 3 | Walid Abbas (c) |
| LB | 19 | Khaled Ibrahim |
| CM | 6 | Majid Rashid | (yellow card) 28' |
| CM | 18 | Abdullah Ramadan | | (substituted off) 79' |
| RW | 14 | Yahya Al Ghassani | | (substituted off) 79' |
| AM | 10 | Fábio Lima |
| LW | 9 | Harib Suhail |
| CF | 11 | Caio Canedo | | (substituted off) 90+2' |
Substitutions:
| DF | 2 | Abdusalam Mohammed | | (substituted on) 79' |
| MF | 5 | Mohammed Abdulbasit | | (substituted on) 79' |
| FW | 15 | Sebastián Tagliabúe | | (substituted on) 79' |
| MF | 7 | Ali Saleh | | (substituted on) 90+2' |
| DF | 16 | Bader Abdelaziz | | (substituted on) 90+2' |
Manager:
(Argentina) Rodolfo Arruabarrena

| GK | 22 | Meshaal Barsham |
| RB | 17 | Ismaeel Mohammad (c) | (substituted off) 85' |
| CB | 15 | Jassem Gaber |
| CB | 5 | Tarek Salman |
| LB | 14 | Homam Ahmed |
| CM | 8 | Ali Assadalla |
| CM | 23 | Assim Madibo |
| CM | 10 | Mohammed Waad | (substituted off) 59' |
| RW | 18 | Khalid Muneer | (substituted off) 59' |
| LW | 11 | Amro Surag | (substituted off) 84' |
| CF | 7 | Ahmed Alaaeldin | (substituted off) 16' |
Substitutions:
| MF | 12 | Yusuf Abdurisag | (substituted on) 16' |
| MF | 9 | Tameem Al-Abdullah | (substituted on) 59' |
| DF | 19 | Ahmed Fadhel | (substituted on) 59' |
| MF | 16 | Hashim Ali | (substituted on) 84' |
| DF | 20 | Salem Al-Hajri | (substituted on) 85' |
Manager:
(Portugal) Bruno Pinheiro

Man of the Match:
Tameem Al-Abdullah (Qatar)

Assistant referees:
Ahmed Sabah (Iraq)
Hayder Abdulhasan (Iraq)
Fourth official:
Mohanad Qasim (Iraq)
Video assistant referee:
Rédouane Jiyed (Morocco)

== Discipline ==
Fair play points would have been used as tiebreakers if the overall and head-to-head records of teams were tied. These were calculated based on yellow and red cards received in all group matches as follows:

- first yellow card: −1 point;
- indirect red card (second yellow card): −3 points;
- direct red card: −4 points;
- yellow card and direct red card: −5 points;

Only one of the above deductions was applied to a player in a single match.

| Team | Match 1 | | | | Match 2 | | | | Match 3 | | | | Points |
| Team | Yellow card | (yellow card) (yellow-red card) | Red card | (yellow card) (red card) | Yellow card | (yellow card) (yellow-red card) | Red card | (yellow card) (red card) | Yellow card | (yellow card) (yellow-red card) | Red card | (yellow card) (red card) | Points |
|---|---|---|---|---|---|---|---|---|---|---|---|---|---|
| Bahrain | 2 | | | | 1 | | | | 5 | | | | –8 |
| Kuwait | 1 | | | | 1 | | | | | 1 | | | –5 |
| Qatar | 1 | | | | 1 | | | | | | | | –2 |
| United Arab Emirates | | | | | 3 | | | | 2 | | | | –5 |
