= Kuwait national football team results (2020–present) =

This article provides details of international football games played by the Kuwait national football team from 2020 to present.

== Results ==
Key
| Win |
| Draw |
| Defeat |

=== 2021 ===
| 18 January 2021 Friendly | Kuwait | 0–1 | Palestine | Kuwait City, Kuwait |
| 17:45 UTC+3 | | Report | Maraaba 71' | Stadium: Jaber Al-Ahmad International Stadium; Referee: Ahmed Al-Ali (Kuwait) |

| 27 January 2021 Friendly | Iraq | 2–1 | Kuwait | Basra, Iraq |
| 18:00 UTC+3 | Dawood 79'; Hussein 89' (pen.) | Report | Al Rashidi 22' | Stadium: Basra Sports City; Referee: Salman Ahmad Falahi (Qatar) |

| 25 March 2021 Friendly | Saudi Arabia | 1–0 | Kuwait | Riyadh, Saudi Arabia |
| 20:30 UTC+3 | Al-Amri 70' | Report | | Stadium: King Saud University Stadium; Referee: Mohamed Bunafoor (Bahrain) |

| 29 March 2021 Friendly | Kuwait | 1–1 | Lebanon | Dubai, United Arab Emirates |
| 17:45 UTC+3 | Al-Khaldi 15' | Report | Kdouh 60' | Stadium: Police Officers' Club Stadium; Referee: Ammar Ali Al Jneibi (United Arab Emirates) |

| 3 June 2021 2022 World Cup qualification | Australia | 3–0 | Kuwait | Kuwait City, Kuwait |
| 22:00 UTC+3 | Leckie 1'; Irvine 24'; Hrustic 66' | Report | | Stadium: Jaber Al-Ahmad International Stadium; Referee: Jumpei Iida (Japan) |

| 11 June 2021 2022 World Cup qualification | Kuwait | 0–0 | Jordan | Kuwait City, Kuwait |
| 22:00 UTC+3 | | Report | | Stadium: Jaber Al-Ahmad International Stadium; Referee: Nawaf Shukralla (Bahrain) |

| 15 June 2021 2022 World Cup qualification | Chinese Taipei | 1–2 | Kuwait | Kuwait City, Kuwait |
| 22:00 UTC+3 | Wu Chun-ching 51' | Report | Nasser 14', 71' | Stadium: Jaber Al-Ahmad International Stadium; Referee: Ahmed Al-Kaf (Oman) |

| 25 June 2021 2021 FIFA Arab Cup | Bahrain | 2–0 | Kuwait | Doha, Qatar |
| 20:00 UTC+3 | Haram 74'; Isa 90+4' | Report | | Stadium: Khalifa International Stadium; Referee: Mustapha Ghorbal (Algeria) |

| 4 September 2021 Friendly | Bosnia and Herzegovina | 1–0 | Kuwait | Zenica, Bosnia and Herzegovina |
| 20:45 UTC+2 | Prevljak 66' | Report | | Stadium: Bilino Polje; Referee: Miloš Milanović (Serbia) |

| 11 November 2021 Friendly | Czech Republic | 7–0 | Kuwait | Olomouc, Czech Republic |
| 18:30 UTC+1 | Barák 26'; Pešek 45', 46'; Souček 57'; Novák 60'; Sýkora 83', 88' | Report | | Stadium: Andrův stadion Referee: Peter Král'oveč (Slovakia) |

| 15 November 2021 Friendly | Lithuania | 1–1 | Kuwait | Vilnius, Lithuania |
| 19:00 UTC+2 | Lasickas 54' | Report | Al Otaibi 43' | Stadium: LFF Stadium; Referee: Aleksandrs Anufrijevs (Latvia) |

=== 2022 ===
| 29 January 2022 Friendly | Kuwait | 2–0 | Libya | Kuwait City, Kuwait |
| 19:30 UTC+3 | Al-Faneeni 8'; Al-Khaldi 48' | Report | | Stadium: Jaber Al-Ahmad International Stadium |

| 1 February 2022 Friendly | Kuwait | 0–2 | Libya | Kuwait City, Kuwait |
| 17:55 UTC+3 | | Report | Al Khoja 25'; Salama 90+1' | Stadium: Jaber Al-Ahmad International Stadium |

| 25 March 2022 Friendly | Latvia | 1–1 | Kuwait | Ta' Qali, Malta |
| 13:00 UTC+1 | Savaļnieks 55' | Report | Al-Mutawa 12' | Stadium: National Stadium; Referee: Matthew De Gabriele (Malta) |

| 29 March 2022 Friendly | Malta | 2–0 | Kuwait | Ta' Qali, Malta |
| 19:00 UTC+2 | Satariano 29'; Teuma 33' | Report | | Stadium: National Stadium; Referee: Thomas Owen (Wales) |

| 1 June 2022 Friendly | Kuwait | 2–0 | Singapore | Abu Dhabi, United Arab Emirates |
| 18:00 UTC+3 | Hammoud 39'; Nasser 87' | Report | | Stadium: Al Nahyan Stadium; Referee: Ahmed Eisa Darwish (United Arab Emirates) |

| 8 June 2022 2023 Asian Cup qualification | Kuwait | 1–2 | Indonesia | Kuwait City, Kuwait |
| 19:15 UTC+3 | Nasser 41' | Report | Klok 44' (pen.); Rachmat 46' | Stadium: Jaber Al-Ahmad International Stadium; Attendance: 6,100; Referee: Nasrullo Kabirov (Tajikistan) |

| 11 June 2022 2023 Asian Cup qualification | Nepal | 1–4 | Kuwait | Kuwait City, Kuwait |
| 19:15 UTC+3 | Gurung 90+4' | Report | Hammoud 28'; Nasser 48', 70'; Al-Faneeni 73' | Stadium: Jaber Al-Ahmad International Stadium; Attendance: 10,360; Referee: Pranjal Banerjee (India) |

| 14 June 2022 2023 Asian Cup qualification | Jordan | 3–0 | Kuwait | Kuwait City, Kuwait |
| 19:15 UTC+3 | Olwan 62'; Al-Mardi 89'; Al-Rawabdeh 90+5' | Report | | Stadium: Jaber Al-Ahmad International Stadium; Attendance: 18,170; Referee: Mohd Amirul Izwan Yaacob (Malaysia) |

| 19 November 2022 Friendly | Kuwait | 2–0 | Lebanon | Dubai, United Arab Emirates |
| 19:00 UTC+4 | Zayid 71' (pen.); Bajeyah 83' | Report | | Stadium: Police Officers' Club Stadium; Referee: Ahmed Eisa Darwish (United Arab Emirates) |

| 30 December 2022 Friendly | Iraq | 1–0 | Kuwait | Basra, Iraq |
| --:-- UTC+3 | Faez 9' | | | Stadium: Al-Minaa Olympic Stadium |

=== 2023 ===
| 7 January 2023 25th Arabian Gulf Cup | Kuwait | 0–2 | Qatar | Basra, Iraq |
| 19:15 UTC+3 | | Report | Surag 23'; Alaaeldin 38' (pen.) | Stadium: Al-Minaa Olympic Stadium; Referee: Ma Ning (China) |

| 10 January 2023 25th Arabian Gulf Cup | United Arab Emirates | 0–1 | Kuwait | Basra, Iraq |
| 16:15 UTC+3 | | Report | Al-Dhefiri 90+3' | Stadium: Al-Minaa Olympic Stadium; Referee: Shukri Al-Hanfoush (Saudi Arabia) |

| 13 January 2023 25th Arabian Gulf Cup | Bahrain | 1–1 | Kuwait | Basra, Iraq |
| 18:00 UTC+3 | Abdullatif 26' | Report | Al-Khaldi 45' | Stadium: Basra International Stadium; Referee: István Kovács (Romania) |

| 24 March 2023 Friendly | Kuwait | 2-0 | Philippines | Kuwait City, Kuwait |
| 22:00 UTC+3 | Bader Al-Fadhel 71'; Ali Khalaf 87' | | | Stadium: Jaber Al-Ahmad International Stadium; Referee: Shukri Al-Hunfoush (Saudi Arabia) |

| 28 March 2023 Friendly | Kuwait | 2–1 | Tajikistan | Kuwait City, Kuwait |
| --:-- UTC+3 | Bader Al-Fadhel 9' Al-Khaldi 61' | | A.Dzhalilov 90' | Stadium: Jaber Al-Ahmad International Stadium; Attendance: 1,000; Referee: Ahmed Al-Kaf (Oman) |

| 12 June 2023 Unofficial Friendly | Kuwait | 3–0 | Zambia | Cairo, Egypt |
| --:-- UTC+3 | Al-Khaldi 16', 59'; El Ebrahim 51' | Report | | Stadium: Cairo International Stadium |

| 15 June 2023 Unofficial Friendly | Kuwait | 2–1 | Sudan | Cairo, Egypt |
| 20:00 UTC+3 | Al-Khaldi 55', 61' | | | Stadium: Cairo International Stadium |

| 21 June 2023 2023 SAFF Championship | Kuwait | 3–1 | Nepal | Bangalore, India |
| 15:30 UTC+5:30 | | | | Stadium: Sree Kanteerava Stadium |

| 24 June 2023 2023 SAFF Championship | Pakistan | 0–4 | Kuwait | Bangalore, India |
| 15:30 UTC+5:30 | | | | Stadium: Sree Kanteerava Stadium; Referee: Pema Tshewang (Bhutan) |

| 27 June 2023 2023 SAFF Championship | India | 1–1 | Kuwait | Bangalore, India |
| 19:30 UTC+5:30 | Chhetri 45+2' | Report | A. Ali 90+2' (o.g.) | Stadium: Sree Kanteerava Stadium |

| 1 July 2023 2023 SAFF Championship Semi-finals | Kuwait | 1–0 (a.e.t.) | Bangladesh | Bengaluru, India |
| 15:00 UTC+5:30 | Al-Buloushi 105+2' | | | Stadium: Sree Kanteerava Stadium |

| 4 July 2023 2023 SAFF Championship Final | Kuwait | 1–1 (a.e.t.) (4–5 p) | India | Bangalore, India |
| 19:30 UTC+5:30 | Al-Khaldi 14' | Report | Chhangte 36' | Stadium: Sree Kanteerava Stadium; Attendance: 26,380; Referee: Prajwol Chhetri (Nepal) |
| | Penalties |
| | Daham (penalty missed); Al Otaibi (penalty scored); Al-Dhefiri (penalty scored); Naji (penalty scored); Al-Khaldi (penalty scored); El Ebrahim (penalty missed) | | (penalty scored) Chhetri; (penalty scored) Jhingan; (penalty scored) Chhangte; (penalty missed) Kumam; (penalty scored) Bose; (penalty scored) Naorem |

| 7 September 2023 Friendly | Kuwait | 3–1 | Bahrain | Dubai, United Arab Emirates |
| 19:00 UTC+4 | Al-Dhefiri 4'; Al-Khaldi 56', 65' | Report | Youssef 72' | Stadium: Police Officers' Club Stadium |

| 11 September 2023 Friendly | Kuwait | 1–3 | Kyrgyzstan | Al Lisaili, United Arab Emirates |
| 20:00 UTC+4 | | Report | | Stadium: The Sevens Stadium |

| 12 October 2023 Friendly | United Arab Emirates | 1–0 | Kuwait | Dubai, United Arab Emirates |
| 21:00 UTC+4 | Al-Zaabi 27' | Report | | Stadium: Al Maktoum Stadium |

| 17 October 2023 Friendly | Syria | 1–2 | Kuwait | Dubai, United Arab Emirates |
| | Al Somah 17' | Report | Al-Khaldi 43', 47' | Stadium: Police Officers' Club Stadium |

| 16 November 2023 2026 WCQ / 2027 ACQ | Kuwait | 0–1 | India | Kuwait City, Kuwait |
| | | Report | M. Singh 75' | Stadium: Jaber Al-Ahmad International Stadium; Attendance: 32,786; Referee: Shaun Evans (Australia) |

| 21 November 2023 2026 WCQ / 2027 ACQ | Afghanistan | 0–4 | Kuwait | Dammam, Saudi Arabia |
| | | Report | | Stadium: Prince Mohamed bin Fahd Stadium (Note: Afghanistan will play their home game at a neutral venue due to the ongoing Afghan conflict.) |

=== 2024 ===
| 12 January 2024 Friendly | Libya | 3–1 | Kuwait | Cairo, Egypt |
| 18:00 UTC+2 | Al Khouja 30', 20'; A. Saleh 90' | Report | Zayid 78' | Stadium: Cairo International Stadium |

| 19 January 2024 Friendly | Kuwait | 0–2 | Uganda | Cairo, Egypt |
| 17:00 UTC+1 | | Report | Ssekiganda 4'; Kitata 85' | Stadium: Cairo International Stadium |

| 21 March 2024 2026 World Cup qualification R2 | Qatar | 3–0 | Kuwait | Doha, Qatar |
| 21:30 UTC+3 | Afif 47', 68'; Al-Rawi 51' | Report | | Stadium: Jassim bin Hamad Stadium; Attendance: 9,826; Referee: Jumpei Iida (Japan) |

| 26 March 2024 2026 World Cup qualification R2 | Kuwait | 1–2 | Qatar | Farwaniya, Kuwait |
| 22:00 UTC+3 | Daham 79' | Report | Ali 77', 80' | Stadium: Ali Sabah Al-Salem Stadium; Attendance: 8,460; Referee: Sadullo Gulmurodi (Tajikistan) |

| 6 June 2024 2026 World Cup qualification R2 | India | 0–0 | Kuwait | Kolkata, India |
| 19:00 UTC+5:30 | | Report (FIFA); Report (AFC) | | Stadium: Salt Lake Stadium; Attendance: 58,921; Referee: Fu Ming (China) |

| 11 June 2024 2026 World Cup qualification R2 | Kuwait | 1–0 | Afghanistan | Farwaniya, Kuwait |
| 18:45 UTC+3 | Al Rashidi 81' | Report | | Stadium: Ali Sabah Al-Salem Stadium; Attendance: 11,680; Referee: Hiroyuki Kimura (Japan) |

| 5 September 2024 2026 World Cup qualification R3 | Jordan | 1–1 | Kuwait | Amman, Jordan |
| 21:00 UTC+3 | Al-Tamari 14' | Report | Nasser 90+2' (pen.) | Stadium: Amman International Stadium; Attendance: 13,555; Referee: Adel Al-Naqbi (United Arab Emirates) |

| 10 September 2024 2026 World Cup qualification R3 | Kuwait | 0–0 | Iraq | Kuwait City, Kuwait |
| 21:00 UTC+3 | | Report | | Stadium: Jaber Al-Ahmad International Stadium; Attendance: 58,000; Referee: Hiroyuki Kimura (Japan) |

| 10 October 2024 2026 World Cup qualification R3 | Oman | 4–0 | Kuwait | Muscat, Oman |
| 20:00 UTC+4 | A. R. Al-Mushaifri 17', 58'; Al-Ghassani 30'; Fawaz 79' | Report | | Stadium: Sultan Qaboos Sports Complex; Attendance: 25,891; Referee: Alireza Faghani (Australia) |

| 15 October 2024 2026 World Cup qualification R3 | Palestine | 2–2 | Kuwait | Doha, Qatar |
| 19:00 UTC+4 | Abou Ali 41' (pen.); Z. Qunbar 90+3' | Report (FIFA); Report (AFC) | Nasser 31' (pen.), 80' | Stadium: Jassim Bin Hamad Stadium; Attendance: 1,827; Referee: Abdulrahman Al-Jassim (Qatar) |

| 14 November 2024 2026 World Cup qualification R3 | Kuwait | 1–3 | South Korea | Kuwait City, Kuwait |
| 17:00 UTC+3 | Daham 60' | Report (FIFA); Report (AFC) | Oh Se-hun 10'; Son Heung-min 19' (pen.); Bae Jun-ho 74' | Stadium: Jaber Al-Ahmad International Stadium; Attendance: 22,791; Referee: Shaun Evans (Australia) |

| 19 November 2024 2026 World Cup qualification R3 | Kuwait | 1–1 | Jordan | Kuwait City, Kuwait |
| 21:15 UTC+3 | Daham 68' | Report | Al-Naimat 21' | Stadium: Jaber Al-Ahmad International Stadium; Attendance: 24,900; Referee: Nazmi Nasaruddin (Malaysia) |

| 9 December 2024 Friendly | Kuwait | 1–1 | Yemen | Doha, Qatar |
| 18:00 UTC+3 | Al-Awadhi 90+5' | Report | Sabarah 86' | Stadium: Abdullah bin Khalifa Stadium |

| 12 December 2024 Friendly | Kuwait | 1–2 | Lebanon | Doha, Qatar |
| 18:00 UTC+3 | Bouresli 11' | Report | El Zein 75'; Merheg 90' | Stadium: Hamad bin Khalifa Stadium |

| 15 December 2024 Friendly | Kuwait | 0–2 | Lebanon | Doha, Qatar |
| 18:00 UTC+3 | | Report | Kassas 4'; Khamis 41' | Stadium: Suheim bin Hamad Stadium |

| 21 December 2024 26th Arabian Gulf Cup GS | Kuwait | 1–1 | Oman | Kuwait City, Kuwait |
| 20:00 UTC+3 | Nasser 34' | Report | Al-Sabhi 42' | Stadium: Jaber Al-Ahmad International Stadium; Attendance: 42,445; Referee: Khalid Al-Turais (Saudi Arabia) |

| 24 December 2024 26th Arabian Gulf Cup GS | United Arab Emirates | 1–2 | Kuwait | Kuwait City, Kuwait |
| 20:30 UTC+3 | Caio 5' | Report | Daham 16'; M. Al-Enezi 89' | Stadium: Jaber Al-Ahmad International Stadium; Attendance: 48,621; Referee: Dahane Beida (Mauritania) |

| 27 December 2024 26th Arabian Gulf Cup GS | Kuwait | 1–1 | Qatar | Kuwait City, Kuwait |
| 17:30 UTC+3 | Daham 74' | Report | Muntari 90+11' | Stadium: Jaber Al-Ahmad International Stadium; Attendance: 57,742; Referee: Mustapha Ghorbal (Algeria) |

| 31 December 2024 26th Arabian Gulf Cup SF | Bahrain | 1–0 | Kuwait | Kuwait City, Kuwait |
| 20:45 UTC+3 | Marhoon 75' | Report | | Stadium: Jaber Al-Ahmad International Stadium; Attendance: 60,122; Referee: István Kovács (Romania) |

=== 2025 ===
| 15 March 2025 Friendly | China | 3–1 | Kuwait | Abu Dhabi, United Arab Emirates |

| 20 March 2025 2026 World Cup qualification R3 | Iraq | 2–2 | Kuwait | Basra, Iraq |
| 21:15 UTC+3 | Hashim 90+3'; Bayesh 90+11' | Report | Nasser 39', 70' | Stadium: Basra International Stadium; Attendance: 45,851; Referee: Ma Ning (China) |

| 25 March 2025 2026 World Cup qualification R3 | Kuwait | 0-1 | Oman | Kuwait City, Kuwait |
| 21:15 UTC+3 | | Report (FIFA); Report (AFC) | Al-Sabhi 56' | Stadium: Jaber Al-Ahmad International Stadium; Attendance: 41,322; Referee: Salman Ahmad Falahi (Qatar) |

| 5 June 2025 2026 World Cup qualification R3 | Kuwait | 0–2 | Palestine | Kuwait City, Kuwait |
| 21:15 UTC+3 | | Report | Seyam 32'; Abou Ali 88' (pen.) | Stadium: Jaber Al-Ahmad International Stadium; Attendance: 5,250; Referee: Sadullo Gulmurodi (Tajikistan) |

| 10 June 2025 2026 World Cup qualification R3 | South Korea | 4–0 | Kuwait | Seoul, South Korea |
| 20:00 UTC+9 | Al Hajeri 30' (o.g.); Lee Kang-in 51'; Oh Hyeon-gyu 54'; Lee Jae-sung 72' | Report (FIFA); Report (AFC) | | Stadium: Seoul World Cup Stadium; Attendance: 41,119; Referee: Majed Al-Shamrani (Saudi Arabia) |

| 8 September Friendly | Syria | 2–2 | Kuwait | Doha, Qatar |
| --:-- UTC+3 | | Report | | Stadium: TBD |

| 9 October Friendly | Uzbekistan | 2–0 | Kuwait | Tashkent, Uzbekistan |
| 18:00 UTC+5 | Shomurodov 10'; Erkinov 19' | Report | | Stadium: Olympic City Stadium; Referee: Mederbek Taichiev (Kyrgyzstan) |

| 14 October Friendly | Kuwait | 0–1 | Morocco | Dubai, United Arab Emirates |
| | | | Hamdallah 45+1' (pen.) | Stadium: TBD |

| 15 November Friendly | Kuwait | 4–3 | Tanzania | Cairo, Egypt |
| 18:00 UTC+2 | Daham 46', 53'; Nasser 64'; Hassan Al-Enezi 69' | Report | Charles 6', 87'; Allarakhia 34' | Stadium: Al Salam Stadium |

| 18 November Friendly | Kuwait | 2–2 | Gambia | Cairo, Egypt |
| | Nasser 65' (pen.); Al-Sharifi 90+2' | Report | A. Ceesay 42', 57' | Stadium: Al Salam Stadium; Referee: Mahmoud El Banna (Egypt) |

| 25 November 2025 FIFA Arab Cup qualification | Mauritania | 0–2 | Kuwait | Al-Rayyan, Qatar |
| 16:00 UTC+3 | | Report | Daham 8'; Daham 24' | Stadium: Jassim Bin Hamad Stadium; Referee: Ma Ning (China) |

| 2 December 2025 FIFA Arab Cup | Egypt | 1–1 | Kuwait | Lusail, Qatar |
| 17:30 UTC+3 | Afsha 88' (pen.) | Report | Al Hajeri 64' | Stadium: Lusail Stadium; Attendance: 24,632; Referee: Espen Eskås (Norway) |

| 6 December 2025 FIFA Arab Cup | Kuwait | 1–3 | Jordan | Al Rayyan, Qatar |
| 14:00 UTC+3 | Nasser 84' | Report | Abu Taha 17'; Al-Rosan 49'; Olwan 90+7' (pen.) | Stadium: Ahmad bin Ali Stadium; Attendance: 35,933; Referee: Cristián Garay (Chile) |

| 9 December 2025 FIFA Arab Cup | United Arab Emirates | 3–1 | Kuwait | Doha, Qatar |
| 17:30 UTC+3 | Al Ghassani 16' (pen.), 18'; Giménez 66' | Report | Al Hajeri 59' | Stadium: Stadium 974; Attendance: 15,357; Referee: Ma Ning (China) |

=== 2026 ===
| 5 June Friendly | Thailand | 2–2 | Kuwait | Pathum Thani, Thailand |
| 19:30 UTC+7 | | | Yousef Majed 48'; Eid Al-Rashidi 68' | Stadium: True BG Stadium; Attendance: 5,437 |

| 23 September 27th Arabian Gulf Cup | Saudi Arabia | v | Kuwait | Jeddah, Saudi Arabia |
| --:-- UTC+3 | | | | Stadium: King Abdullah Sports City Stadium |

| 26 September 27th Arabian Gulf Cup | Kuwait | v | Iraq | Jeddah, Saudi Arabia |
| --:-- UTC+3 | | | | Stadium: Prince Abdullah Al-Faisal Sports City Stadium |

| 29 September 27th Arabian Gulf Cup | Oman | v | Kuwait | Jeddah, Saudi Arabia |
| --:-- UTC+3 | | | | Stadium: Prince Abdullah Al-Faisal Sports City Stadium |

| November 2026 WAFF Championship | Kuwait | v | Oman |
| --:-- |

| November 2026 WAFF Championship | Kuwait | v | Oman |
| --:-- |

=== 2027 ===
| 8 January 2027 Asian Cup GS | Kuwait | v | Oman | Riyadh, Saudi Arabia |
| --:-- | | | | Stadium: King Saud University Stadium |

| 12 January 2027 Asian Cup GS | Palestine | v | Kuwait | Al Khobar, Saudi Arabia |
| --:-- | | | | Stadium: Aramco Stadium |

| 17 January 2027 Asian Cup GS | Saudi Arabia | v | Kuwait | Jeddah, Saudi Arabia |
| --:-- | | | | Stadium: King Abdullah Sports City Stadium |

== Head to head records ==
As of match played 29 September 2026

Head to head records
| Opponent | P | W | D | L | GF | GA | W% | D% | L% |
|---|---|---|---|---|---|---|---|---|---|
| Afghanistan | 2 | 2 | 0 | 0 | 5 | 0 | 100 | 0 | 0 |
| Australia | 1 | 0 | 0 | 1 | 0 | 3 | 0 | 0 | 100 |
| Bahrain | 4 | 1 | 1 | 2 | 4 | 5 | 25 | 25 | 50 |
| Bangladesh | 1 | 1 | 0 | 0 | 1 | 0 | 100 | 0 | 0 |
| Bosnia and Herzegovina | 1 | 0 | 0 | 1 | 0 | 1 | 0 | 0 | 100 |
| Chinese Taipei | 1 | 1 | 0 | 0 | 2 | 1 | 100 | 0 | 0 |
| Czech Republic | 1 | 0 | 0 | 1 | 0 | 7 | 0 | 0 | 100 |
| Egypt | 1 | 0 | 1 | 0 | 1 | 1 | 0 | 100 | 0 |
| India | 4 | 0 | 3 | 1 | 2 | 3 | 0 | 75 | 25 |
| Indonesia | 1 | 0 | 0 | 1 | 1 | 2 | 0 | 0 | 100 |
| Iraq | 5 | 0 | 2 | 3 | 5 | 8 | 0 | 40 | 60 |
| Jordan | 5 | 0 | 3 | 2 | 3 | 8 | 0 | 60 | 40 |
| Kyrgyzstan | 1 | 0 | 0 | 1 | 1 | 3 | 0 | 0 | 100 |
| Lebanon | 4 | 1 | 1 | 2 | 4 | 5 | 25 | 25 | 50 |
| Libya | 2 | 1 | 0 | 1 | 2 | 2 | 50 | 0 | 50 |
| Latvia | 1 | 0 | 1 | 0 | 1 | 1 | 0 | 100 | 0 |
| Lithuania | 1 | 0 | 1 | 0 | 1 | 1 | 0 | 100 | 0 |
| Malta | 1 | 0 | 0 | 1 | 0 | 2 | 0 | 0 | 100 |
| Nepal | 2 | 2 | 0 | 0 | 7 | 2 | 100 | 0 | 0 |
| Oman | 4 | 0 | 1 | 3 | 2 | 9 | 0 | 25 | 75 |
| Pakistan | 1 | 1 | 0 | 0 | 4 | 0 | 100 | 0 | 0 |
| Palestine | 3 | 0 | 1 | 2 | 2 | 5 | 0 | 33.33 | 66.67 |
| Philippines | 1 | 1 | 0 | 0 | 2 | 0 | 100 | 0 | 0 |
| Qatar | 4 | 0 | 1 | 3 | 2 | 8 | 0 | 25 | 75 |
| Saudi Arabia | 2 | 0 | 0 | 2 | 0 | 2 | 0 | 0 | 100 |
| Singapore | 1 | 1 | 0 | 0 | 2 | 0 | 100 | 0 | 0 |
| South Korea | 2 | 0 | 0 | 2 | 1 | 7 | 0 | 0 | 100 |
| Syria | 1 | 1 | 0 | 0 | 2 | 1 | 100 | 0 | 0 |
| Tajikistan | 1 | 1 | 0 | 0 | 2 | 1 | 100 | 0 | 0 |
| Tanzania | 1 | 1 | 0 | 0 | 4 | 3 | 100 | 0 | 0 |
| Thailand | 12 | 7 | 1 | 4 | 31 | 11 | 58.33 | 8.33 | 33.33 |
| United Arab Emirates | 3 | 2 | 0 | 1 | 3 | 2 | 66.67 | 0 | 33.33 |
| Uzbekistan | 1 | 0 | 0 | 1 | 0 | 2 | 0 | 0 | 100 |
| Yemen | 2 | 0 | 1 | 1 | 2 | 3 | 0 | 50 | 50 |
| Totals | 78 | 24 | 18 | 35 | 99 | 111 | 30.77 | 23.08 | 44.87 |
