= 25th Arabian Gulf Cup knockout stage =

Football tournament knockout stage

The knockout stage of the 25th Arabian Gulf Cup was the second and final stage of the 25th Arabian Gulf Cup, following the group stage. It was played from 16 to 19 January 2023. The top two teams from each group (four in total) advanced to the knockout stage to compete in a single-legged single-elimination tournament, beginning with the semi-finals and followed by the final.

== Qualified teams ==
The top two highest-placing teams from each of the two groups advanced to the knockout stage.

Group	Winners	Runners-up
A	Iraq	Oman
B	Bahrain	Qatar

== Schedule ==
The schedule of each round was as follows.

Round	Date
Semi-finals	16 January 2023
Final	19 January 2023

== Format ==
All ties were single-legged. If the score was level at the end of normal time, extra time was played, and if the score still remained level, the match was decided by a penalty shoot-out.

== Bracket ==
Semi-finals
16 January – Basra
Iraq	2
Qatar	1
16 January – Basra
Bahrain	0
Oman	1

Final
19 January – Basra
Iraq (a.e.t.)	3
Oman	2

== Semi-finals ==
Team 1	Score	Team 2
Iraq	2–1	Qatar
Bahrain	0–1	Oman

=== Iraq vs Qatar ===
16 January 2023
16:15 UTC+3

Iraq	2–1	Qatar
Bayesh 19'; Hussein 43'	Report	Surag 28'

Basra International Stadium, Basra
Referee: Ma Ning (China)

Iraq	Qatar

GK	12	Jalal Hassan (c)
RB	6	Alai Ghasem	(yellow card) 81'
CB	4	Mustafa Nadhim
CB	5	Ali Faez
LB	15	Dhurgham Ismail
CM	19	Mohammed Ali Abboud	(yellow card) 6'	(substituted off) 64'
CM	16	Amir Al-Ammari
RW	7	Hussein Ali		(substituted off) 81'
AM	14	Amjad Attwan		(substituted off) 90+4'
LW	8	Ibrahim Bayesh
CF	18	Aymen Hussein
Substitutions:
MF	11	Sherko Karim		(substituted on) 64'
DF	2	Munaf Younis		(substituted on) 81'
DF	20	Hussein Jabbar		(substituted on) 90+4'
Manager:
(Spain) Jesús Casas

GK	22	Meshaal Barsham
RB	17	Ismaeel Mohammad (c)	(yellow card) 9'	(substituted off) 76'
CB	15	Jassem Gaber
CB	5	Tarek Salman	(yellow card) 60'
LB	14	Homam Ahmed	(yellow card) 72'	(substituted off) 81'
CM	10	Mohammed Waad
CM	23	Assim Madibo
RW	11	Amro Surag		(substituted off) 76'
AM	8	Ali Assadalla	(yellow card) 90+7'
LW	18	Khalid Muneer		(substituted off) 61'
CF	7	Ahmed Alaaeldin	(yellow card) 17'
Substitutions:
FW	9	Tameem Al-Abdullah		(substituted on) 61'
FW	12	Yusuf Abdurisag		(substituted on) 76'
MF	20	Salem Al-Hajri		(substituted on) 76'
FW	2	Hazem Shehata	(yellow card) 90+7'	(substituted on) 81'
Manager:
(Portugal) Bruno Pinheiro

Man of the Match:
Aymen Hussein (Iraq)

Assistant referees:
Zhang Cheng (China)
Zhou Fei (China)
Fourth official:
István Kovacs (Romania)
Video assistant referee:
Fu Ming (China)
Assistant video assistant referee:
Jérémie Pignard (France)

=== Bahrain vs Oman ===
16 January 2023
20:15 UTC+3

Bahrain	0–1	Oman
	Report	Al-Yahmadi 83'

Al-Minaa Olympic Stadium, Basra
Referee: Adel Al-Naqbi (United Arab Emirates)

Bahrain	Oman

GK	21	Sayed Mohammed Jaffer (c)
RB	16	Sayed Isa
CB	2	Amine Bennadi
CB	3	Waleed Al Hayam
LB	4	Sayed Dhiya Saeed
CM	14	Ali Haram	(substituted off) 87'
CM	15	Jasim Al-Shaikh	(substituted off) 87'
RW	7	Ali Madan	(substituted off) 85'
AM	10	Abdulwahab Al-Malood	(substituted off) 63'
LW	20	Mahdi Al-Humaidan
CF	9	Abdulla Yusuf Helal
Substitutions:
MF	19	Kamil Al-Aswad	(substituted on) 63'
MF	8	Mohamed Marhoon	(substituted on) 85'
DF	12	Mahdi Abdullatif	(substituted on) 87'
MF	11	Ibrahim Al-Khatal	(substituted on) 87'
Manager:
(Portugal) Hélio Sousa

GK	1	Ibrahim Al-Mukhaini
RB	6	Ahmed Al-Khamisi
CB	3	Fahmi Durbin
CB	2	Mohammed Al-Musalami (c)
LB	14	Ahmed Al-Kaabi
CM	10	Jameel Al-Yahmadi
CM	23	Harib Al-Saadi
CM	8	Zahir Al-Aghbari		(substituted off) 89'
AM	20	Salaah Al-Yahyaei		(substituted off) 90+7'
CF	7	Issam Al-Sabhi	(yellow card) 85'	(substituted off) 90+6'
CF	17	Rabia Al-Alawi		(substituted off) 89'
Substitutions:
DF	16	Khalid Al-Braiki		(substituted on) 89'
MF	4	Arshad Al-Alawi		(substituted on) 89'
MF	15	Musab Al-Mamari		(substituted on) 90+6'
FW	21	Mataz Saleh		(substituted on) 90+7'
Manager:
(Croatia) Branko Ivanković

Man of the Match:
Salah Al-Yahyaei (Oman)

Assistant referees:
Ali Al Nuami (United Arab Emirates)
Sabet Suroor (United Arab Emirates)
Fourth official:
Abdullah Jamali (Kuwait)
Video assistant referee:
Ahmed Darwish (United Arab Emirates)
Assistant video assistant referee:
Abdullah Al-Shehri (Saudi Arabia)

== Final ==
19 January 2023
19:00 UTC+3

Iraq	3–2 (a.e.t.)	Oman
Bayesh 24'; Attwan 116' (pen.); Younis 120+2'	Report	Al-Yahyaei 90+10' (pen.); Al-Malki 119'

Basra International Stadium, Basra
Referee: István Kovács (Romania)

Iraq	Oman

GK	12	Jalal Hassan (c)
RB	6	Alai Ghasem		(substituted off) 105'
CB	4	Mustafa Nadhim
CB	5	Ali Faez
LB	15	Dhurgham Ismail		(substituted off) 86'
CM	16	Amir Al-Ammari		(substituted off) 90+7'
CM	8	Ibrahim Bayesh
RW	7	Hussein Ali		(substituted off) 90+2'
AM	14	Amjad Attwan
LW	11	Sherko Karim		(substituted off) 46'
CF	18	Aymen Hussein	(yellow card) 55'	(substituted off) 85'
Substitutions:
MF	19	Mohammed Ali Abboud	(yellow card) 109'	(substituted on) 46'
MF	10	Hasan Abdulkareem	(yellow card) 90+5'	(substituted on) 85'
FW	21	Aso Rostam		(substituted on) 86'
DF	2	Munaf Younis	(yellow card) 106'	(substituted on) 90+2'
MF	13	Rewan Amin		(substituted on) 90+7'
MF	20	Hussein Jabbar	(yellow card) 120+6'	(substituted on) 105'
Manager:
(Spain) Jesús Casas

GK	1	Ibrahim Al-Mukhaini
RB	6	Ahmed Al-Khamisi		(substituted off) 77'
CB	3	Fahmi Durbin
CB	2	Mohammed Al-Musalami (c)	(yellow card) 114'
LB	14	Ahmed Al-Kaabi
CM	10	Jameel Al-Yahmadi
CM	23	Harib Al-Saadi	(yellow card) 26'
CM	8	Zahir Al-Aghbari		(substituted off) 104'
AM	20	Salaah Al-Yahyaei		(substituted off) 109'
CF	7	Issam Al-Sabhi		(substituted off) 90+5'
CF	17	Rabia Al-Alawi		(substituted off) 78'
Substitutions:
MF	4	Arshad Al-Alawi		(substituted on) 77'
FW	9	Omar Al-Malki	(yellow card) 120+1'	(substituted on) 78'
DF	16	Khalid Al-Braiki		(substituted on) 90+5'
FW	21	Mataz Saleh		(substituted on) 104'
MF	15	Musab Al-Mamari		(substituted on) 109'
Manager:
(Croatia) Branko Ivanković

Man of the Match:
Amjad Attwan (Iraq)

Assistant referees:
Vasile Marinescu (Romania)
Ovidiu-Mihai Artene (Romania)
Fourth official:
Salman Falahi (Qatar)
Fifth official:
Zahi Al-Shammari (Qatar)
Video assistant referee:
Jérémie Pignard (France)
Assistant video assistant referees:
Rédouane Jiyed (Morocco)
Abdullah Al-Shehri (Saudi Arabia)
