= 2023 Basra International Stadium stampede =

Crowd crush before a football match in Basra

Basra International Stadium stampede
- Date: 19 January 2023
- Time: 10:00–14:00 GMT
- Location: Outside the Basra International Stadium; 30°26′24″N 47°46′47″E
- Deaths: 1
- Injuries: 60+

On 19 January 2023, a stampede outside the Basra International Stadium in the Iraqi city of Basra ahead of the 25th Arabian Gulf Cup final between Iraq and Oman killed one person and injured up to 60 others. The families of those affected blamed inadequate crowd control and ticketless fans for the death and injuries. The stadium security staff blamed ticketless fans.

== Background ==
The final match of the 25th Arabian Gulf Cup, between Iraq and Oman, was to be played at the Basra stadium. This was the first time that the tournament was being held in Iraq since 1979. In a statement before the game, Iraq's Ministry of Interior encouraged anyone who did not have tickets to the final to leave the area around the stadium. It stated that the stadium was completely full and that all gates had been closed.

== Events ==
On January 19, 2023, thousands of fans without tickets waited outside Basra International Stadium since daybreak in the hopes of viewing the rare home international final, resulting in a crush as crowds attempted to enter the stadium. One person was killed and others were injured. Despite the crush, the Arabian Gulf Cup final match went ahead as planned, and Iraq won the eight-nation event by defeating Oman 3–2 after extra time.

== See also ==
- Crowd collapses and crushes § Crowd "stampedes"
- 2005 Al-Aimmah Bridge disaster
- Karbala stampede
- Hillsborough disaster
- Oppenheimer Stadium disaster
- Ellis Park Stadium disaster
- Accra Sports Stadium disaster
- Heysel Stadium disaster
