= Aymen Hussein =

Iraqi footballer (born 1996)

- Hussein with Iraq in 2025

Personal information
- Full name: Aymen Hussein Ghadhban Al-Mafraje
- Date of birth: 22 March 1996 (age 30)
- Place of birth: Hawija, Kirkuk, Iraq
- Height: 1.95 m (6 ft 5 in)
- Position: Striker

Team information
- Current team: Pakhtakor
- Number: 29

Youth career
- 2009–2011: Al-Alam
- 2011–2012: Tuz
- 2012–2013: Ghaz Al-Shamal

Senior career*
Years	Team	Apps	(Gls)
2013–2014	Duhok		(1)
2014–2017	Al-Naft	37	(21)
2017–2018	Al-Shorta	5	(5)
2018	Al-Naft	22	(11)
2018–2019	CS Sfaxien	6	(0)
2019–2021	Al-Quwa Al-Jawiya	33	(26)
2021–2022	Umm Salal	22	(11)
2022–2023	Al-Markhiya	10	(6)
2023	Al-Jazira	10	(1)
2023	Raja CA	5	(0)
2023–2024	Al-Quwa Al-Jawiya	33	(27)
2024–2025	Al-Khor	11	(0)
2025	→ Al-Wakrah (loan)	8	(1)
2025–2026	Al-Karma	18	(9)
2026–	Pakhtakor	9	(1)

International career^{‡}
2014–2015	Iraq U20	3	(1)
2015–2018	Iraq U23	14	(11)
2024	Iraq Olympic (O.P.)	3	(2)
2015–	Iraq	101	(34)
Medal record
Representing Iraq
Men's football
Arabian Gulf Cup
Winner	2023	Team
King's Cup (Thailand)
Winner	2023	Team
Winner	2025	Team
International Friendship Championship
Winner	2019	Team
- * Club domestic league appearances and goals as of 23 October 2026 ‡ National team caps and goals as of 13 November 2026

Aymen Hussein Ghadhban Al-Mafraje (Arabic: أيمن حسين غضبان المفرجي; born 22 March 1996), nicknamed Abu Tubar (Arabic: أبو طبر, lit. 'The Hatchet Man'), is an Iraqi professional footballer who plays as a striker for Uzbekistan Super League club Pakhtakor Tashkent and the Iraq national team.

== Club career ==
In 2009, Hussein was spotted as a gifted teenager with his local team and it was because of a local resident who was also a board member at the Al-Alam SC who recommended the player to his club. He played for youth Al-Alam in the provincial league, and for the first team and then moved to Tuz FC, and with no club from Kirkuk in the top divisions in the Iraqi league, Aymen took the unorthodox route in his attempts into getting into a top flight of the Iraqi Premier League by signing for Gas Al-Shamal a club which was then in the second tier of the Kurdistan League, a division formed of primarily reserve players from the top Kurdish clubs.

=== Duhok ===
At the conclusion of the 2012–13 season, Hussein received his first opportunity to play in the Iraqi Premier League when Duhok assistant coach Khalid Mohammed Sabbar contacted him with a lucrative contract offer. Hussein accepted immediately, expressing immense joy at the prospect of working under the former Iraq captain alongside renowned coaches Fajr Ibrahim of Syria and Thair Ahmed during his tenure with the club.

He appeared only a few times for Duhok scoring one goals in the first stage of the season, however with salaries going unpaid for months at the cash-strapped club feeling the full ramifications of the financial crisis which had hit the Kurdistan region, Hussein made the decision to try his luck in Baghdad. He had been one of six players at Duhok released due to their financial troubles during the latter part of the 2014.

=== Al Naft ===
Hussein transferred to Al-Naft in 2014. His breakthrough season came in the 2016–17 season for Al Naft, where he scored 12 goals in 10 games launching Al Naft to the top of the league, before an injury prevented him sidelined all the way from February till May. Al Naft continued on their impressive set of results and ended up finishing as the league runners up, which is their best ever result.

=== Al Shorta ===
On 22 August 2017, Hussein signed for Iraqi giants Al Shorta, to replace Marwan Hussein. He made his debut on 21 November, scoring in the matchday one fixture against Karbalaa FC. He scored twice in his second game, a 4–1 win over Al-Bahri, he then scored in two more games, to extend his scoring record to four games in a row. On the fifth game, Hussein missed a last-minute penalty to end his goal-scoring streak. Aymen would then leave the Al-Shorta to join the Iraqi U-23 side in the 2018 AFC U-23 Championship in China, despite the club's objections. After his return from the national team, Al Shorta released him from his contract as he was set to join Qatari side Al Ahli, however negotiations fell through in the final stages. He then returned to his former club Al Naft, despite Al Shorta insisting his release was conditional on him joining Al Ahli.

=== Return to Al Naft ===
On 2 February 2018, Hussein returned to his former club Al-Naft with his favorite coach Hassan Ahmed. Hussein started his first match with Al Naft against Al-Hudood FC, he missed a penalty and another against Naft Al-Wasat. After five games he scored goal against Al-Talaba in the 1–0 victory in April and continued to score. He finished his season with Al Naft with 11 goals in 22 matches in the league. The team finished in 3rd position. He was released from Al-Naft after the game against CS Sfaxien 1–1, because of disagreements.

=== CS Sfaxien ===
On 15 September 2018, Tunisian club Sfaxien announced on the last day of the summer transfer window the signing of Hussein on a three-year contract. Hussein was set to be paid 450,000 dollars per season. He did not make any appearances in the first half of the season due to a paperwork error, rendering him ineligible to play competitive games for the side. He made his first appearances in the Tunisian league in February 2019. Aymen struggled to get consistent gametime, mainly due to his lack of match fitness after missing the first half of the season. In July 2019, Aymen requested his release from Sfaxien due to the lack of playing time, and expressed his wishes to return to Iraq Aymen's contract was terminated by mutual consent, but he did not receive a compensation payment. He then sued the club, and FIFA ruled in his favor, ordering the Tunisian side to pay him 50,000 US dollars.

=== Al Quwa Al Jawiya ===
On 5 August 2018, Aymen officially returned to the Iraqi league, joining Al Quwa Al Jawiya on a one-year contract. On 22 February 2020, he scored his first hat-trick with the club in a 3–0 victory against Al-Sinaat Al-Kahrabaiya SC. The season was suspended due to the October protests in Baghdad and then cancelled all together due to the COVID-19 pandemic. The following season, Aymen had his best year yet, scoring 22 goals to end the season as the top goal scorer, leading his club to the title. It was the first league title of Aymen's career, as well as his first golden boot award. Following this successful season, Aymen received attention from clubs abroad, including Egyptian giants Al Ahly, and clubs in Algeria, Iran, and the United Arab Emirates, and the striker stated his intention to try playing overseas once again.

=== Umm Salal ===
In summer 2021, Hussein joined Umm Salal in Qatar. Aymen scored 11 goals in 22 matches, averaging a goal every other game in the Qatrai league. He finished as the league's 5th highest top goal scorer, and helped Umm Salal secure a 6th-place finish. In July 2022, Umm Salal announced that the player will not be renewed, and thanked the player for his services.

=== Al Markhiya and Al Jazira ===
In July 2022, newly promoted side Al Markhiya signed Aymen Hussein, to keep the player in Qatar. Aymen led his side to a shocking win over Qatari giants Al Sadd, after scoring 2 goals and assisting another in a 4–3 victory, which marked his side's first ever league win over Al-Sadd. The following week he scored once again to rescue a point for his team against Qatar SC. Aymen was given permission to join the Iraqi national team during the Arabian Gulf Cup, despite the league season still ongoing. Due to his great performance in the first half of the season, which was followed up by being the joint top goal scorer in the Arabian Gulf Cup tournament, Aymen attracted the attention of Emirati giants Al Jazira.

On 7 February 2023, Aymen Hussein joined Al Jazira on a two-and-a-half-year deal. He was meant to be a replacement for the club's captain and talisman Ali Mabkhout, who was set to leave the club in order to complete his mandatory service with the United Arab Emirates Armed Forces. However, the player's service was delayed, meaning he was able to finish the season with his club. This led to Aymen struggling for playtime as he only featured 6 times, mainly off the bench. He scored his only goal vs Al Bataeh Club. The team finished in fifth position, 9 points away from winner Shabab Al Ahli. On 24 May, Aymen's contract was terminated by mutual consent.

=== Raja CA and return to Al-Quwa Al-Jawiya ===
On 23 August 2023, Hussein signed a renewable one-year contract with Moroccan side Raja CA. Aymen found it difficult to adapt in Morocco, and struggled with his form. He also struggled personally as the strained diplomatic relations between Iraq and Morocco made it difficult to get the paperwork necessary to relocate his family to Morocco, he thus asked for his release but was persuaded to stay by management. After failing to score in his first 5 games and repeated attempts to relocate his family had failed, he once again requested that his contract be terminated, and was granted his release by the Moroccan club. The club went on to win the Moroccan title that season.

In October 2023, Aymen returned to Al Quwa Al Jawiya in Iraq. Aymen has his best goal scoring season of his career, scoring 27 goals in the league campaign, winning the Iraqi golden boot for a second time. However, his season had a bitter end, as his team fell short to local rivals Al-Shorta in both the league and the cup, finishing runners up to them on both occasions.

=== Al Khor and loan to Al-Wakrah ===
On 16 July 2024, Qatari side Al Khor announced that they have signed Ayemn Hussein on a two-year deal This marked the third club in Qatar that Ayemn Hussein has signed for. He joined the club late for pre-season due to his participation with Iraq in the Olympic games, regardless he started his first game two days later, in a goalless draw against Al-Gharafa. In September that year, he suffered a rib injury during the first international break of the season, which kept him out of action for a month, missing 3 league games for Al-Khor. In February 2025, he joined Al-Wakrah on loan until the end of the season.

=== Al-Karma ===
In August 2025, Hussein returned to Iraq, joining Al-Karma for a record transfer fee of 1.25 billion Iraqi dinars.

=== Pakhtakor ===
Hussein made his debut for Pakhtakor on August 6, 2026, in the Uzbekistan Super League match against FC Bukhara, coming on as a substitute in the 86th minute of the match.

== International career ==
=== Iraq U23 ===
Hussein first represented Iraq in 2015, also playing for the U23 Iraqi team. He was called up to the 2016 AFC U-23 Championship in Qatar. He scored the winning goal in the third-place playoff match against Qatar, which won Iraq the bronze medal and sent them to the 2016 Rio Olympic Games, Hussein was injured in a friendly match with the senior team against Syria on 18 March 2016, preventing him from going to the Olympics.

The following year, Hussein was present at the 2018 AFC U-23 Championship qualification, he scored 5 goals in the first match against Afghanistan. He also scored another goal against Saudi Arabia, to ensure that Iraq won all three games and qualified for the 2018 AFC U-23 Championship. Hussein scored twice in three games in the tournament, as Iraq went out in the quarter-finals.

Hussein was called up to the Iraqi U23 side participating in the 2024 Summer Olympics as one of the three overage players. He scored a penalty in a 2–1 win against Ukraine, and a header against Argentina in the group stage as Iraq finished bottom of their group with 3 points.

=== Senior team ===
On 26 August 2015, Hussein earned his first international cap, playing against Lebanon in a friendly match. He scored his first goal against the United Arab Emirates on September 5, 2017, in a 1–0 victory in a World Cup qualifying match. Iraq failed to qualify to the world cup, finishing 5th in their group in the final round.

He was called up to the 23rd Arabian Gulf Cup, where Iraq ended up reaching the semi-finals. He was also part of the side in the 2019 WAFF Championship, where Iraq lost in the final to Bahrain on home soil.

Following two back to back major injuries for Mohanad Ali, Aymen became Iraq's starting striker in the 2022 World Cup qualifiers. He scored three goals in the qualifiers, against the United Arab Emirates, Lebanon and Syria, however Iraq failed to qualify to the world cup.

In 2021, Aymen Hussein was called up the 2021 FIFA Arab Cup. In a bizarre incident, Iraq's manager, Željko Petrović, got on the field and forcibly removed Aymen from re-taking a last minute penalty against Oman. Iraq were knocked out from the group stage.

Aymen secured his first title with his country by winning the 25th Arabian Gulf Cup, hosted on home soil. He finished the tournament as the joint top scorer, netting three goals alongside Ibrahim Bayesh. He was called up to the 2023 King's Cup, a friendly tournament hosted in Thailand, which Iraq won.

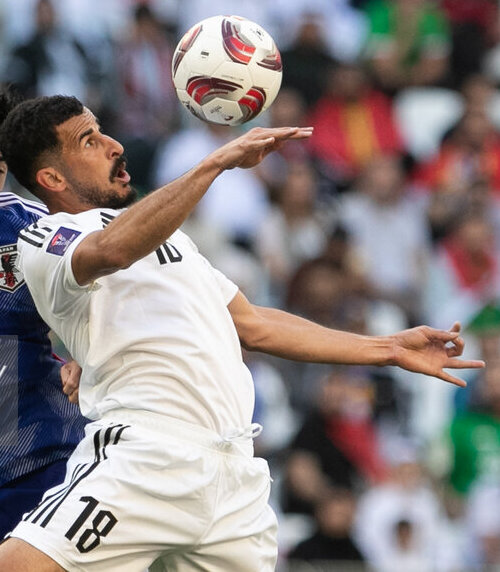
Hussein during the 2023 AFC Asian Cup

In December 2023, he was named in the Iraqi squad for the Asian Cup in Qatar. Aymen scored in all three group stages matches, including a brace in a 2–1 victory over Japan which qualified his country to the knockout stages of the Asian tournament. That match also recorded the first win for Iraq against Japan since the 1982 Asian Games. In the round of 16 match against Jordan, he scored a goal to grant his team a 2–1 lead, before receiving a controversial second yellow card for his celebration, in a match ended in a shock 3–2 defeat for Iraq with Jordan scoring two goals in the stoppage time.

On 5 September 2024, he scored the only goal in a 1–0 victory over Oman during the third round of the 2026 FIFA World Cup qualification. During the match, he sustained an injury that caused internal bleeding and was later taken to Kuwait for treatment. Later that year, on 22 December, he netted his nation's first goal in the 26th Arabian Gulf Cup in a 1–0 victory over Yemen.

On 31 March 2026, Hussein scored the decisive goal assisted by Marko Farji in a 2–1 victory over Bolivia in the 2026 World Cup qualification inter-confederation play-off final, qualifying his nation to the World Cup for the first time since 1986.

On 1 June, he was named in the 26-man squad for the 2026 FIFA World Cup. On 16 June, he scored his country's first goal at the 2026 World Cup, but later netted an own goal as Iraq suffered a 4–1 defeat to Norway. He became the second player to score for Iraq at the World Cup, following Ahmed Radhi's goal 40 years earlier. He also became the third player in FIFA World Cup history to score a goal and an own goal in the same match, following Ernie Brandts of the Netherlands in 1978 and Mario Mandžukić of Croatia in 2018. He sustained an injury during the first half against France which forced him to miss the rest of the tournament.

== Style of play ==
Hussein is seen as the typical complete forward who can play up front. Not seen as the most versatile, but he is a natural goal scorer. Aymen is often deployed as a target man, tasked with holding up the ball, being physical with defenders, and being in the box for crosses. Aymen is also known for his work-rate, being able to press defenders and capitalize on their mistakes.

Since 2015, he has been seen as the best heir to former international striker Younis Mahmoud.

== Personal life ==
Hussein was born in the rural village of Al-Safra in the Hawija district of Kirkuk, which had been controlled by ISIS and was the scene of coalition air-strikes from 2014 to 2017. Insurgents have frequently targeted oil pipelines in the village since the fall of Saddam Hussein in 2003, with car bombs, suicide bombings and improvised explosive device (IED) blasts becoming a normal part of life for Hussein. His father, an officer in the Iraqi Army, was killed on duty by an al-Qaeda attack in 2008. His brother was kidnapped by ISIS and his whereabouts are still unknown, while he and his family became internally displaced within Iraq in 2014.

Upon his arrival at O'Hare International Airport in Chicago for the 2026 FIFA World Cup, he was detained and questioned by U.S. authorities for seven hours before being allowed to enter the country.

== Career statistics ==
=== International ===
As of 29 September 2026

Appearances and goals by national team and year
National team	Year	Apps	Goals
Iraq	2015	1	0
Iraq	2016	3	0
Iraq	2017	11	1
Iraq	2018	8	0
Iraq	2019	7	1
Iraq	2020	2	0
Iraq	2021	14	4
Iraq	2022	9	5
Iraq	2023	13	6
Iraq	2024	16	14
Iraq	2025	8	1
Iraq	2026	7	2
Total		99	34

Scores and results list Iraq's goal tally first, score column indicates score after each Hussein goal.

List of international goals scored by Aymen Hussein
No.	Date	Venue	Opponent	Score	Result	Competition
1	5 September 2017	Amman International Stadium, Amman, Jordan	United Arab Emirates	1–0	1–0	2018 FIFA World Cup qualification
2	26 March 2019	Basra International Stadium, Basra, Iraq	Jordan	1–1	3–2	2019 International Friendship Championship
3	27 January 2021	Basra International Stadium, Basra, Iraq	Kuwait	2–1	2–1	Friendly
4	29 May 2021	Al Fayhaa Stadium, Basra, Iraq	Nepal	3–2	6–2	Friendly
5	29 May 2021	Al Fayhaa Stadium, Basra, Iraq	Nepal	4–2	6–2	Friendly
6	12 October 2021	Zabeel Stadium, Dubai, United Arab Emirates	United Arab Emirates	2–1	2–2	2022 FIFA World Cup qualification
7	1 February 2022	Saida Municipal Stadium, Sidon, Lebanon	Lebanon	1–0	1–1	2022 FIFA World Cup qualification
8	18 March 2022	Al-Madina Stadium, Baghdad, Iraq	Zambia	3–1	3–1	Friendly
9	29 March 2022	Al-Rashid Stadium, Dubai, United Arab Emirates	Syria	1–1	1–1	2022 FIFA World Cup qualification
10	23 September 2022	King Abdullah II Stadium, Amman, Jordan	Oman	1–1	1–1 (3–4 p)	2022 Jordan International Tournament
11	26 September 2022	Amman International Stadium, Amman, Jordan	Syria	1–0	1–0	2022 Jordan International Tournament
12	12 January 2023	Basra International Stadium, Basra, Iraq	Yemen	3–0	5–0	25th Arabian Gulf Cup
13	12 January 2023	Basra International Stadium, Basra, Iraq	Yemen	4–0	5–0	25th Arabian Gulf Cup
14	16 January 2023	Basra International Stadium, Basra, Iraq	Qatar	2–1	2–1	25th Arabian Gulf Cup
15	7 September 2023	700th Anniversary Stadium, Chiang Mai, Thailand	India	2–2	2–2 (5–4 p)	2023 King's Cup
16	10 September 2023	700th Anniversary Stadium, Chiang Mai, Thailand	Thailand	1–0	2–2 (5–4 p)	2023 King's Cup
17	17 October 2023	Amman International Stadium, Amman, Jordan	Jordan	1–1	2–2 (5–3 p)	2023 Jordan International Tournament
18	15 January 2024	Ahmad bin Ali Stadium, Al Rayyan, Qatar	Indonesia	3–1	3–1	2023 AFC Asian Cup
19	19 January 2024	Education City Stadium, Al Rayyan, Qatar	Japan	1–0	2–1	2023 AFC Asian Cup
20	19 January 2024	Education City Stadium, Al Rayyan, Qatar	Japan	2–0	2–1	2023 AFC Asian Cup
21	24 January 2024	Jassim bin Hamad Stadium, Al Rayyan, Qatar	Vietnam	2–1	3–2	2023 AFC Asian Cup
22	24 January 2024	Jassim bin Hamad Stadium, Al Rayyan, Qatar	Vietnam	3–2	3–2	2023 AFC Asian Cup
23	29 January 2024	Khalifa International Stadium, Al Rayyan, Qatar	Jordan	2–1	2–3	2023 AFC Asian Cup
24	26 March 2024	Rizal Memorial Stadium, Manila, Philippines	Philippines	1–0	5–0	2026 FIFA World Cup qualification
25	26 March 2024	Rizal Memorial Stadium, Manila, Philippines	Philippines	3–0	5–0	2026 FIFA World Cup qualification
26	6 June 2024	Gelora Bung Karno Stadium, Jakarta, Indonesia	Indonesia	1–0	2–0	2026 FIFA World Cup qualification
27	11 June 2024	Basra International Stadium, Basra, Iraq	Vietnam	3–1	3–1	2026 FIFA World Cup qualification
28	5 September 2024	Basra International Stadium, Basra, Iraq	Oman	1–0	1–0	2026 FIFA World Cup qualification
29	10 October 2024	Basra International Stadium, Basra, Iraq	Palestine	1–0	1–0	2026 FIFA World Cup qualification
30	15 October 2024	Yongin Mireu Stadium, Yongin, South Korea	South Korea	1–1	2–3	2026 FIFA World Cup qualification
31	22 December 2024	Sulaibikhat Stadium, Sulaibikhat, Kuwait	Yemen	1–0	1–0	26th Arabian Gulf Cup
32	25 March 2025	Amman International Stadium, Amman, Jordan	Palestine	1–0	1–2	2026 FIFA World Cup qualification
33	31 March 2026	Estadio BBVA, Monterrey, Mexico	Bolivia	2–1	2–1	2026 FIFA World Cup qualification
34	16 June 2026	Gillette Stadium, Foxborough, United States	Norway	1–1	1–4	2026 FIFA World Cup

== Honours ==
CS Sfaxien

- Tunisian Cup: 2018–19

Al-Quwa Al-Jawiya

- Iraqi Premier League: 2020–21
- Iraq FA Cup: 2020–21

Iraq

- Arabian Gulf Cup: 2023

Individual

- Iraq Stars League Top scorer: 2020–21, 2023–24
- Arabian Gulf Cup Top scorer (joint): 2023
- AFC Asian Cup Team of the Tournament: 2023
- Soccer Iraq Player of the Year: 2024
