= Bruno Pinheiro (football manager) =

Portuguese football manager

Personal information
- Full name: Bruno Miguel Nogueira Pinheiro
- Date of birth: 30 October 1976 (age 49)
- Place of birth: Charneca de Caparica, Portugal

Team information
- Current team: Académico Viseu (manager)

Managerial career
- Years: Team
- 2006–2007: Benfica (youth)
- 2007–2008: Belenenses (youth)
- 2009: Mafra
- 2009–2012: Belenenses (youth)
- 2009–2010: AF Setúbal
- 2012: Belenenses (youth assistant)
- 2012–2013: Belenenses (youth)
- 2014–2015: Eléctrico
- 2016–2020: Aspire Academy
- 2018: Qatar U21
- 2018–2020: Qatar U19
- 2019: Qatar U20
- 2019: Eupen (assistant)
- 2020–2022: Estoril
- 2023: Qatar
- 2023: Al Sadd
- 2024–2025: Gil Vicente
- 2025–2026: Eupen
- 2026–: Académico Viseu

Bruno Miguel Nogueira Pinheiro (born 30 October 1976) is a Portuguese professional football manager, currently in charge of Primeira Liga club Académico de Viseu.

He coached youth and amateur football in Portugal before moving to Qatar in 2016 and leading the nation's youth teams, including at the 2019 FIFA U-20 World Cup. In two years at Estoril, he won the Liga Portugal 2 title in 2021 and achieved ninth place in the Primeira Liga. As interim manager of the Qatar senior team in January 2023, he reached the semi-finals of the 25th Arabian Gulf Cup.

== Coaching career ==
=== Early years ===
Born in Charneca de Caparica, Almada, Pinheiro was a youth coach at Benfica and Belenenses. From 2014, he had his first experience in the third-tier Campeonato de Portugal, at Eléctrico. From 2016, he worked in Qatar at the Aspire Academy and with the nation's youth teams. He led the under-19 team to the semi-finals of the 2018 AFC Championship, qualifying for the 2019 FIFA U-20 World Cup in Poland, where they lost all three games in a group-stage exit.

=== Estoril ===
On 27 June 2020, Pinheiro was named manager of the LigaPro team Estoril. His team made the Taça de Portugal semi-finals in his first season, losing 5–1 on aggregate to Benfica, and won promotion to the Primeira Liga as champions with four more points than Vizela.

Pinheiro won his first top-flight game on 6 August 2021, 2–0 at fellow promoted team Arouca. The following 1 July, having achieved ninth place, he chose to let his contract expire.

=== Qatar senior team ===
In December 2022, Pinheiro returned to Qatar to lead the senior national team on an interim basis at the 25th Arabian Gulf Cup to be held in Iraq at the start of the new year. He replaced Félix Sánchez, who was allowed to leave after the team were eliminated at the group stage of their hosting of the 2022 FIFA World Cup.

Pinheiro's team won 2–0 against Kuwait on his debut on 7 January, then lost to Bahrain and drew with the United Arab Emirates to advance as group runners-up on goal difference over the Kuwaitis. The side then lost 2–1 to the hosts at the Basra International Stadium. On 7 February, the Qatar Football Association appointed experienced compatriot Carlos Queiroz until 2026.

=== Al Sadd ===
On 12 July 2023, Pinheiro was appointed as manager of Qatar Stars League club Al Sadd, replacing Juan Manuel Lillo. Four months later, on 16 November, although the Doha-based side was sitting top of the Qatari league, Pinheiro was sacked after an away loss to Jordanian club Al-Faisaly in the AFC Champions League.

== Managerial statistics ==
As of match played 17 February 2025

Managerial record by team and tenure
Team	Nat	From	To	Record							
Team	Nat	From	To	G	W	D	L	GF	GA	GD	Win %
Eléctrico	(Portugal)	1 July 2014	31 August 2015	33	11	10	12	39	38	+1	33.33
Estoril	(Portugal)	26 June 2020	1 July 2022	80	37	22	21	118	84	+34	46.25
Qatar	(Qatar)	1 January 2023	30 January 2023	4	1	1	2	5	5	+0	25.00
Al Sadd	(Qatar)	11 July 2023	16 November 2023	17	10	3	4	41	16	+25	58.82
Gil Vicente	(Portugal)	12 August 2024	18 February 2025	24	8	7	9	28	31	−3	33.33
Total				158	67	43	48	231	174	+57	42.41

== Honours ==
Estoril

- Liga Portugal 2: 2020–21

Individual

- Primeira Liga's Manager of the Month: August 2021
