= Ahmed Fadhel =

Qatari footballer (born 1993)

Personal information
- Full name: Ahmed Fadhel Hasabah
- Date of birth: 7 April 1993 (age 33)
- Place of birth: Qatar
- Position: Midfielder

Team information
- Current team: Al-Wakrah
- Number: 5

Youth career
- ASPIRE

Senior career*
Years	Team	Apps	(Gls)
2012–	Al-Wakrah	156	(3)
2020–2021	→ Qatar (loan)	20	(1)
2025	→ Qatar (loan)	4	(0)

International career^{‡}
2015-2016	Qatar U20	3	(0)
2016-2018	Qatar U23	6	(0)
2022-	Qatar	5	(0)
- * Club domestic league appearances and goals as of 28 October 2022 (UTC) ‡ National team caps and goals as of 28 October 2022 (UTC)

Ahmed Fadhel (Arabic: أحمد فاضل; born 7 April 1993) is a Qatari footballer. He currently plays for Al-Wakrah and the Qatar national team.
