= Mahdi Dashti =

Kuwaiti footballer

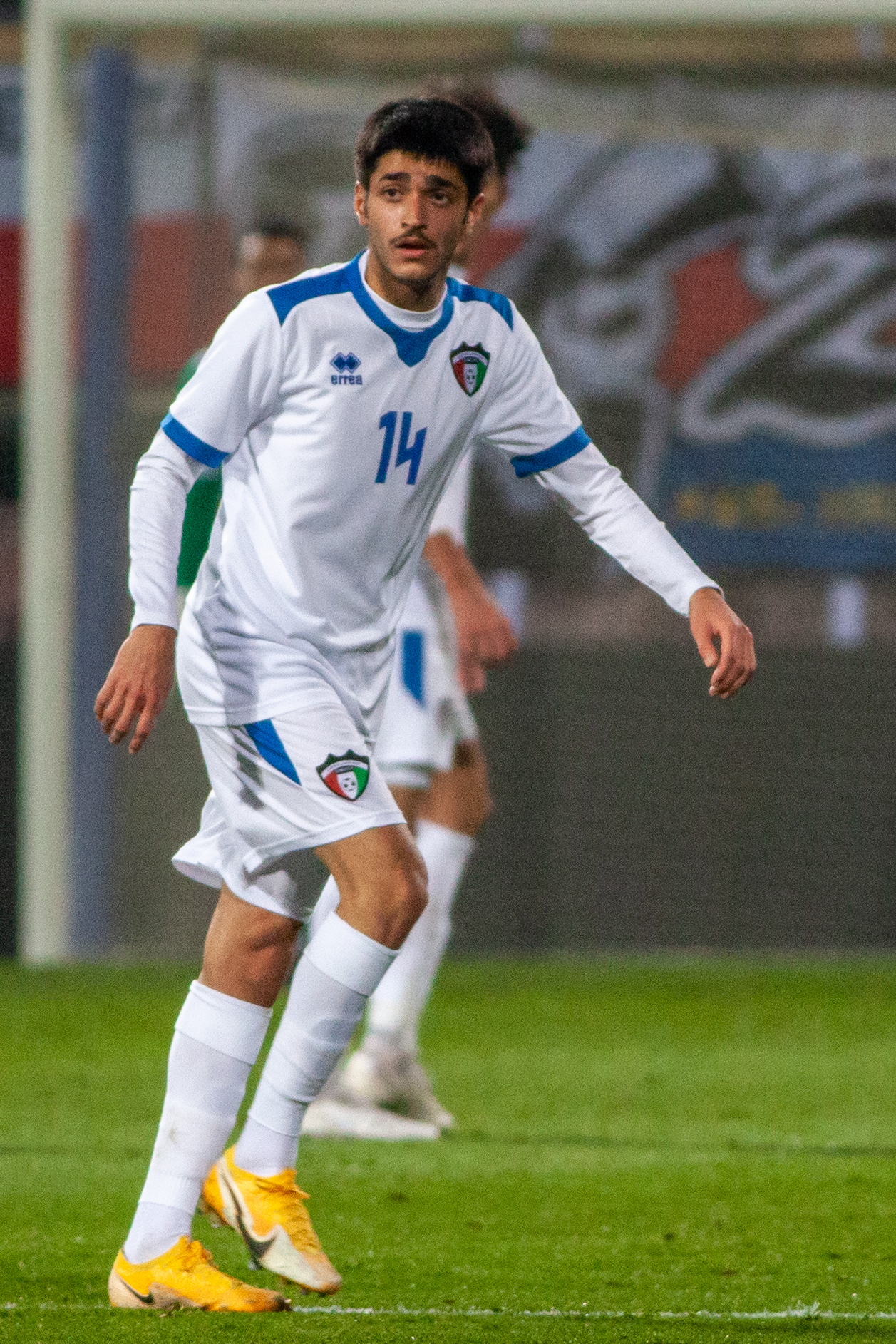

Personal information
- Full name: Mahdi Dashti
- Date of birth: 26 October 2001 (age 25)
- Place of birth: Kuwait
- Height: 1.73 m (5 ft 8 in)
- Position: Midfielder

Team information
- Current team: Al-Salmiya
- Number: 19

Youth career
- Al-Salmiya

Senior career*
Years	Team	Apps	(Gls)
2019–	Al-Salmiya		

International career^{‡}
2021–	Kuwait	16	(0)
- * Club domestic league appearances and goals as of 7 June 2026 ‡ National team caps and goals as of 7 June 2026

Mahdi Dashti (Arabic: مَهْدِيّ دَشْتِيّ; born 26 October 2001) is a Kuwaiti professional footballer who plays as a right back for Al-Salmiya.
