= Eid Al-Rashidi =

Kuwaiti footballer (born 1999)

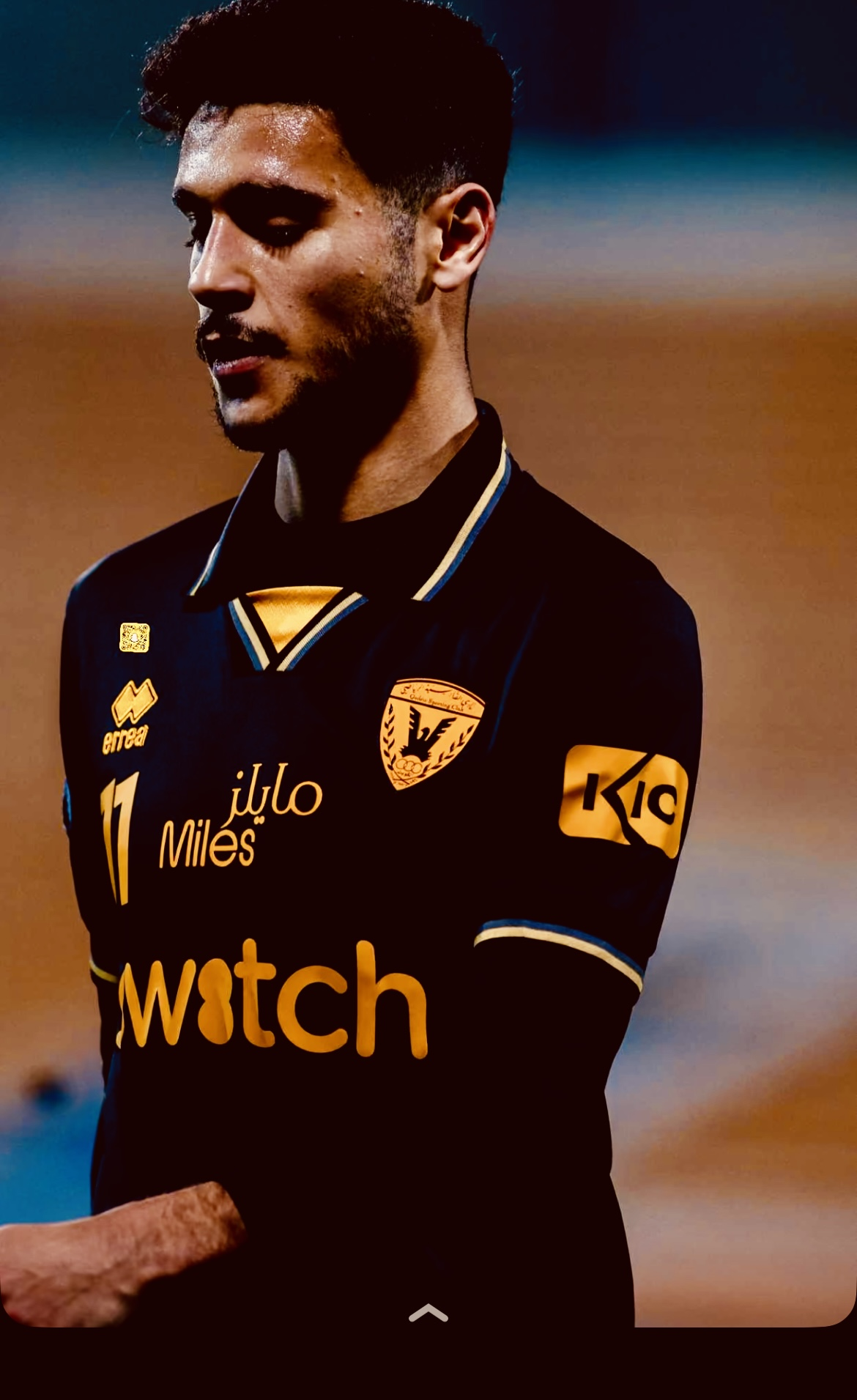

Personal information
- Full name: Eid Naser Dughaim M. J. H. Al-Rasheedi
- Date of birth: 25 May 1999 (age 27)
- Place of birth: Kuwait City, Kuwait
- Position: Winger

Team information
- Current team: Al-Quwa Al-Jawiya

Senior career*
Years	Team	Apps	(Gls)
2016–	Qadsia		
2026	Al-Quwa Al-Jawiya (loan)	6	(1)

International career^{‡}
2018–	Kuwait	63	(5)
2021	Kuwait U23		
- * Club domestic league appearances and goals as of 23:55, 24 January 2026 (UTC) ‡ National team caps and goals as of 23:55, 21 December 2025 (UTC)

Eid Nasser Dgheim Al-Rashidi (Arabic: عيد ناصر الرشيدي; born 25 September 1999) is a Kuwaiti professional footballer who plays as a winger for Iraq Stars League club Al-Quwa Al-Jawiya and the Kuwait national team.

== Club career ==
Al-Rashidi began his senior career with the Kuwait Premier League club Qadsia in 2016. On 2 March 2024, he extended his contract with the club until 2029.

== International career ==
Al-Rashidi was called up to the Kuwait national team for the 2019 WAFF Championship. He was also called up for the 25th Arabian Gulf Cup and 26th Arabian Gulf Cup. He was again called up to the national team for the 2025 FIFA Arab Cup.

== International goals ==
Scores and results list Kuwait's goal tally first.

No.	Date	Venue	Opponent	Score	Result	Competition
1.	5 June 2026	True BG Stadium, Pathum Thani, Thailand	Thailand	2–2	2–2	Friendly
2.	13 November 2026	Al-Sadaqua Walsalam Stadium, Kuwait City, Kuwait	Syria	2–0	3–0	Friendly

== Honours ==
Qadsia

- Kuwait Emir Cup: 2023–24

Al-Quwa Al-Jawiya

- Iraq Stars League: 2025–26
