= Abdusalam Mohammed =

Emirati footballer (born 1992)

Personal information
- Full name: Abdusalam Mohammed Al-Dabdob
- Date of birth: 19 June 1992 (age 34)
- Place of birth: Abu Dhabi, United Arab Emirates
- Height: 1.75 m (5 ft 9 in)
- Position: Defender

Team information
- Current team: Kalba
- Number: 25

Youth career
- Al Ain

Senior career*
Years	Team	Apps	(Gls)
2012–2014	Al Ain	7	(0)
2014–2019	Baniyas	37	(0)
2019–	Kalba	78	(1)

International career
2022–	United Arab Emirates	4	(1)
- * Club domestic league appearances and goals

Abdusalam Mohammed (Arabic:عبد السلام محمد) (born 19 June 1992) is an Emirati footballer who played in the Arabian Gulf League for Kalba.

== International career ==
=== International goals ===
Scores and results list the United Arab Emirates' goal tally first.

No.	Date	Venue	Opponent	Score	Result	Competition
1.	28 March 2023	Al Nahyan Stadium, Abu Dhabi, United Arab Emirates	Thailand	2–0	2–0	Friendly
