= Amro Surag =

Qatari footballer (born 1998)

Personal information
- Full name: Amro Abdelfatah Ali Surag
- Date of birth: 8 April 1998 (age 28)
- Place of birth: Qatar
- Positions: Winger; right back

Team information
- Current team: Al-Gharafa
- Number: 11

Youth career
- –2017: Al-Gharafa

Senior career*
Years	Team	Apps	(Gls)
2017–	Al-Gharafa	149	(9)
- * Club domestic league appearances and goals as of 17 January 2026

Amro Abdelfatah Ali Surag (born 8 April 1998) is a Qatari professional footballer who plays as a winger or right back for Qatar Stars League side Al-Gharafa.

== Career statistics ==
=== Club ===
As of 1 June 2019.

Club	Season	League			Cup		Continental		Other		Total	
Club	Season	Division	Apps	Goals	Apps	Goals	Apps	Goals	Apps	Goals	Apps	Goals
Al-Gharafa	2016–17	Qatar Stars League	1	0	0	0	0	0	0	0	1	0
Al-Gharafa	2017–18	Qatar Stars League	20	3	7 (Note: Appearances in the Qatar Cup)	3	0	0	0	0	27	6
Al-Gharafa	2018–19	Qatar Stars League	19	3	4	1	0	0	0	0	23	4
Career total			40	6	11	4	0	0	0	0	51	10

== International goals ==
No.	Date	Venue	Opponent	Score	Result	Competition
1.	7 January 2023	Al-Minaa Olympic Stadium, Basra, Iraq	Kuwait	1–0	2–0	25th Arabian Gulf Cup
2.	16 January 2023	Basra International Stadium, Basra, Iraq	Iraq	1–1	1–2	25th Arabian Gulf Cup
