= Mobarak Al-Faneeni =

Kuwaiti footballer (born 2000)

Personal information
- Full name: Mobarak Al-Faneeni
- Date of birth: 21 January 2000 (age 26)
- Place of birth: Kuwait
- Height: 1.66 m (5 ft 5 in)
- Position: Left winger

Team information
- Current team: Al-Salmiya
- Number: 10

Senior career*
Years	Team	Apps	(Gls)
2017–2023	Al-Salmiya	47	(9)
2023–2026	Qadsia SC		
2026–	Al-Salmiya		

International career^{‡}
2019–	Kuwait	44	(6)
- * Club domestic league appearances and goals ‡ National team caps and goals as of 14 November 2026

Mobarak Al-Faneeni (born on 21 January 2000) is a Kuwaiti professional football player who plays for the Kuwait national team.

On 14 November 2019, Al-Faneeni scored his first goal for Kuwait at the 2022 FIFA World Cup qualification against Chinese Taipei in a 9–0 victory.

== International goals ==
Scores and results list Kuwait's goal tally first.

No.	Date	Venue	Opponent	Score	Result	Competition
1.	27 November 2019	Abdullah bin Khalifa Stadium, Doha, Qatar	Saudi Arabia	3–0	3–1	24th Arabian Gulf Cup
2.	14 November 2019	Al Kuwait Sports Club Stadium, Kuwait City, Kuwait	Chinese Taipei	3–0	9–0	2022 FIFA World Cup qualification
3.	11 June 2022	Jaber Al-Ahmad International Stadium, Kuwait City, Kuwait	Nepal	4–0	4–1	2023 AFC Asian Cup qualification
4.	24 June 2023	Sree Kanteerava Stadium, Bangalore, India	Pakistan	2–0	4–0	2023 SAFF Championship
5.	24 June 2023	Sree Kanteerava Stadium, Bangalore, India	Pakistan	3–0	4–0	2023 SAFF Championship
