= Ahmed Al-Dhefiri =

Kuwaiti footballer

Personal information
- Full name: Ahmed Al-Dhefiri
- Date of birth: 8 February 1992 (age 34)
- Place of birth: Kuwait
- Height: 1.79 m (5 ft 10 in)
- Position: Midfielder

Team information
- Current team: Kuwait SC
- Number: 8

Youth career
- Qadsia SC

Senior career*
| Years | Team | Apps | (Gls) |
| 2013–2022 | Qadsia SC | | |
| 2017 | → Al-Qadisiyah (loan) | | |
| 2022– | Kuwait SC | | |

International career
| 2014– | Kuwait | 89 | (4) |
- * Club domestic league appearances and goals

Ahmed Al-Dhefiri (born 9 January 1992) is a Kuwaiti professional footballer plays as a midfielder for Kuwait SC and the Kuwait national team.

== International career ==
=== International goals ===
Scores and results list Kuwait's goal tally first.

| No. | Date | Venue | Opponent | Score | Result | Competition |
|---|---|---|---|---|---|---|
| 1. | 27 November 2019 | Abdullah bin Khalifa Stadium, Doha, Qatar | Saudi Arabia | 1–0 | 3–1 | 24th Arabian Gulf Cup |
| 2. | 10 January 2023 | Al-Minaa Olympic Stadium, Basra, Iraq | United Arab Emirates | 1–0 | 1–0 | 25th Arabian Gulf Cup |
| 3. | 7 September 2023 | Police Officers' Club Stadium, Dubai, United Arab Emirates | Bahrain | 1–0 | 3–1 | Friendly |

== Honors ==
Al–Qadisa

- Kuwaiti Premier League: 2013–14, 2015–16
- Kuwait Federation Cup: 2018–19
- Kuwait Emir Cup: 2014–15
- Kuwait Crown Prince Cup: 2013–14, 2017–18
- Kuwait Super Cup: 2014
- AFC Cup: 2014

Al-Kuwait

- Kuwaiti Premier League: 2022–23
- Kuwait Emir Cup: 2022–23
- Kuwait Super Cup: 2023–24
- AFC Challenge League: 2025-2026
