= 25th Arabian Gulf Cup =

International football tournament in 2023

كأس الخليج العربي 25

Tournament details
- Host country: Iraq
- Dates: 6–19 January
- Teams: 8 (from 1 confederation)
- Venues: 2 (in 1 host city)

Final positions
- Champions: Iraq (4th title)
- Runners-up: Oman

Tournament statistics
- Matches played: 15
- Goals scored: 39 (2.6 per match)
- Attendance: 665,495 (44,366 per match)
- Top scorer(s): (Iraq) Aymen Hussein (Iraq) Ibrahim Bayesh (3 goals each)
- Best player: (Iraq) Ibrahim Bayesh
- Best goalkeeper: (Oman) Ibrahim Al-Mukhaini

The 25th Arabian Gulf Cup, known as Khaleeji Zain 25 for sponsorship reasons, was the 25th edition of the biennial football competition for the eight members of the Arab Gulf Cup Football Federation. The tournament was hosted in Iraq for the first time since 1979, in the host city of Basra.

Hosts Iraq won their fourth title by beating Oman 3–2 after extra time in the final.

== Teams ==
Team	Appearance	Previous best performance	FIFA Rankings
Team	Appearance	Previous best performance	October 2022
Qatar	25th	Winners (1992, 2004, 2014)	50
Saudi Arabia	24th	Winners (1994, 2002, 2003–04)	51
Iraq (hosts)	16th	Winners (1979, 1984, 1988)	68
United Arab Emirates	24th	Winners (2007, 2013)	70
Oman	23rd	Winners (2009, 2017–18)	75
Bahrain (holders)	25th	Winners (2019)	85
Kuwait	25th	Winners (1970, 1972, 1974, 1976, 1982, 1986, 1990, 1996, 1998, 2010)	149
Yemen	10th	Group stage (2003–04, 2004, 2007, 2009, 2010, 2013, 2014, 2017–18, 2019)	155

=== Draw ===
The draw was held on 25 October 2022 at 11:00 UTC+3 at the Grand Millennium Al Seef in Basra. The eight teams were drawn into two groups of four, by selecting one team from each of the four ranked pots. For the draw, the teams were allocated to four pots based on the FIFA World Rankings of October 2022. Pot 1 contained the hosts Iraq and the holders Bahrain, who were assigned to A1 and A2 respectively.

Pot 1	Pot 2	Pot 3	Pot 4
Iraq (68) (hosts); Bahrain (85) (holders)	Qatar (50); Saudi Arabia (51)	United Arab Emirates (70); Oman (75)	Kuwait (149); Yemen (155)

=== Squads ===
Each team had to register a squad of 23 players, three of whom must be goalkeepers.

== Venues ==
Location of areas hosting the 25th Arabian Gulf Cup
1 Basra

(Iraq) Basra
Basra International Stadium	Al-Minaa Olympic Stadium
Capacity: 65,227	Capacity: 30,000

== Officials ==
Referees

- (China) Ma Ning
- (Iraq) Ali Sabah
- (Kuwait) Abdullah Jamali
- (Oman) Ahmed Al-Kaf
- (Qatar) Salman Falahi
- (Romania) István Kovács
- (Saudi Arabia) Shukri Al-Hanfoush
- (United Arab Emirates) Adnan Al-Naqbi
- (Uzbekistan) Ilgiz Tantashev

Assistant Referees

- (China) Zhang Cheng
- (China) Zhou Fei
- (Oman) Rashid Abdi
- (Oman) Rashad Al-Hakmani
- (Romania) Ovidiu-Mihai Artene
- (Romania) Vasile Marinescu
- (Qatar) Zahi Al-Shammari
- (Qatar) Khaled Ayed

Video Assistant Referees

- (China) Fu Ming
- (Iraq) Mohanad Qasim
- (France) Jérémie Pignard
- (Morocco) Rédouane Jiyed
- (Qatar) Abdullah Al-Marri
- (Saudi Arabia) Abdullah Al-Shehri
- (United Arab Emirates) Ahmed Darwish

== Group stage ==
Tiebreakers
The ranking of teams in the group stage was determined as follows:
1. Points obtained in all group matches:
  - Win: 3 points;
  - Draw: 1 point;
  - Loss: 0 points;
2. Goal difference in all group matches;
3. Number of goals scored in all group matches.

=== Group A ===
Pos	Team	Pld	W	D	L	GF	GA	GD	Pts	Qualification
1	Iraq (H)	3	2	1	0	7	0	+7	7	Advance to knockout stage
2	Oman	3	2	1	0	5	3	+2	7	Advance to knockout stage
3	Saudi Arabia	3	1	0	2	3	4	−1	3	
4	Yemen	3	0	0	3	2	10	−8	0	

Source: AGCFF
Rules for classification: Group stage tiebreakers
(H) Hosts
6 January 2023
19:00 UTC+3

Iraq	0–0	Oman
	Report

Basra International Stadium, Basra
Referee: István Kovács (Romania)
6 January 2023
21:45 UTC+3

Yemen	0–2	Saudi Arabia
	Report	Al-Nabit 18'; Al-Juwayr 34' (pen.)

Basra International Stadium, Basra
Referee: Salman Falahi (Qatar)

9 January 2023
16:15 UTC+3

Oman	3–2	Yemen
Fadhl 2' (o.g.); A. Al-Alawi 37'; Al-Sabhi 47'	Report	Al-Matari 12' (pen.); O. Al-Dahi 30'

Basra International Stadium, Basra
Referee: Abdullah Jamali (Kuwait)
9 January 2023
19:15 UTC+3

Saudi Arabia	0–2	Iraq
	Report	Bayesh 30'; Rostam 86'

Basra International Stadium, Basra
Referee: Adel Al-Naqbi (United Arab Emirates)

12 January 2023
18:00 UTC+3

Iraq	5–0	Yemen
Nadhim 40'; Attwan 64'; Hussein 74' (pen.), 75'; Ali 88'	Report

Basra International Stadium, Basra
Referee: Ilgiz Tantashev (Uzbekistan)
12 January 2023
18:00 UTC+3

Saudi Arabia	1–2	Oman
Al-Ammar 41'	Report	R. Al-Alawi 34'; Al-Saadi 84'

Al-Minaa Olympic Stadium, Basra
Referee: Ma Ning (China)

=== Group B ===
Pos	Team	Pld	W	D	L	GF	GA	GD	Pts	Qualification
1	Bahrain	3	2	1	0	5	3	+2	7	Advance to knockout stage
2	Qatar	3	1	1	1	4	3	+1	4	Advance to knockout stage
3	Kuwait	3	1	1	1	2	3	−1	4	
4	United Arab Emirates	3	0	1	2	2	4	−2	1	

Source: AGCFF
Rules for classification: Group stage tiebreakers
7 January 2023
16:15 UTC+3

Bahrain	2–1	United Arab Emirates
Al-Aswad 60'; Al-Shaikh 77'	Report	Tagliabúe 90+2'

Al-Minaa Olympic Stadium, Basra
Referee: Ahmed Al-Kaf (Oman)
7 January 2023
19:15 UTC+3

Kuwait	0–2	Qatar
	Report	Surag 21'; Alaaeldin 37' (pen.)

Al-Minaa Olympic Stadium, Basra
Referee: Ma Ning (China)

10 January 2023
16:15 UTC+3

United Arab Emirates	0–1	Kuwait
	Report	Al-Dhefiri 90+3'

Al-Minaa Olympic Stadium, Basra
Referee: Shukri Al-Hanfoush (Saudi Arabia)
10 January 2023
19:15 UTC+3

Qatar	1–2	Bahrain
Alaaeldin 34'	Report	Waad 72' (o.g.); Yusuf 89' (pen.)

Al-Minaa Olympic Stadium, Basra
Referee: Ilgiz Tantashev (Uzbekistan)

13 January 2023
18:00 UTC+3

Bahrain	1–1	Kuwait
Al-Humaidan 26'	Report	Al-Khaldi 45'

Basra International Stadium, Basra
Referee: István Kovács (Romania)
13 January 2023
18:00 UTC+3

United Arab Emirates	1–1	Qatar
Lima 77'	Report	Al-Abdullah 88'

Al-Minaa Olympic Stadium, Basra
Referee: Ali Sabah (Iraq)

== Knockout stage ==
=== Bracket ===
Semi-finals
16 January – Basra
Iraq	2
Qatar	1
16 January – Basra
Bahrain	0
Oman	1

Final
19 January – Basra
Iraq (a.e.t.)	3
Oman	2

=== Semi-finals ===
16 January 2023
16:15 UTC+3

Iraq	2–1	Qatar
Bayesh 19'; Hussein 43'	Report	Surag 28'

Basra International Stadium, Basra
Referee: Ma Ning (China)

16 January 2023
20:15 UTC+3

Bahrain	0–1	Oman
	Report	Al-Yahmadi 83'

Al-Minaa Olympic Stadium, Basra
Referee: Adel Al-Naqbi (United Arab Emirates)

=== Final ===
19 January 2023
19:00 UTC+3

Iraq	3–2 (a.e.t.)	Oman
Bayesh 24'; Attwan 116' (pen.); Younis 120+2'	Report	Al-Yahyaei 90+10' (pen.); Al-Malki 119'

Basra International Stadium, Basra
Referee: István Kovács (Romania)

== Winner ==
25th Arabian Gulf Cup Winner

Iraq
Fourth title

== Goalscorers ==
There were 39 goals scored in 15 matches, for an average of 2.6 goals per match.

3 goals

- (Iraq) Ibrahim Bayesh
- (Iraq) Aymen Hussein

2 goals

- (Iraq) Amjad Attwan
- (Qatar) Ahmed Alaaeldin
- (Qatar) Amro Surag

1 goal

- (Bahrain) Mahdi Abdullatif
- (Bahrain) Kamil Al-Aswad
- (Bahrain) Jasim Al-Shaikh
- (Bahrain) Abdulla Yusuf Helal
- (Iraq) Hussein Ali Al-Saedi
- (Iraq) Mustafa Nadhim
- (Iraq) Aso Rostam
- (Iraq) Munaf Younis
- (Kuwait) Ahmed Al-Dhefiri
- (Kuwait) Shabaib Al-Khaldi
- (Oman) Arshad Al-Alawi
- (Oman) Rabia Al-Alawi
- (Oman) Omar Al-Maliki
- (Oman) Harib Al-Saadi
- (Oman) Issam Al-Sabhi
- (Oman) Jameel Al-Yahmadi
- (Oman) Salaah Al-Yahyaei
- (Qatar) Tameem Al-Abdullah
- (Saudi Arabia) Turki Al-Ammar
- (Saudi Arabia) Musab Al-Juwayr
- (Saudi Arabia) Sumayhan Al-Nabit
- (United Arab Emirates) Fábio Lima
- (United Arab Emirates) Sebastián Tagliabúe
- (Yemen) Omar Al-Dahi
- (Yemen) Abdulwasea Al-Matari

1 own goal

- (Qatar) Mohammed Waad (against Bahrain)
- (Yemen) Ali Fadhl (against Oman)

== Team statistics ==
This table shows all team performance.

Pos	Team	Pld	W	D	L	GF	GA	GD	Pts
Final phase
1	Iraq	5	4	1	0	12	3	+9	13
2	Oman	5	3	1	1	8	6	+2	10
3	Bahrain	4	2	1	1	5	4	+1	7
4	Qatar	4	1	1	2	5	5	0	4
Eliminated in the group stage
5	Kuwait	3	1	1	1	2	3	−1	4
6	Saudi Arabia	3	1	0	2	3	4	−1	3
7	United Arab Emirates	3	0	1	2	2	4	−2	1
8	Yemen	3	0	0	3	2	10	−8	0

== Prize money and awards ==
=== Prize money ===
Position	Amount (USD)
Champions	1,000,000
Runner-up	750,000
Total	1,750,000

=== Player awards ===
The following awards were given:

Award	Player
Top Scorer	(Iraq) Aymen Hussein
Most Valuable Player	(Iraq) Ibrahim Bayesh
Best Goalkeeper	(Oman) Ibrahim Al-Mukhaini

== Broadcasters ==
Middle East

Territory	Broadcaster	Ref.
Bahrain	Bahrain Sport	
Iraq	Al-Iraqiya Sports; Alrabiaa Sports; UTV; Al-Sharqiya; Al-Sumaria	
Jordan	Jordan Sport	
Kuwait	KTV Sports	
Saudi Arabia	KSA Sport	
Oman	Oman Sports	
Qatar	Alkass	
United Arab Emirates	AD Sports; Dubai Sports; Sharjah Sports	

Rest of the world

Territory	Broadcaster	Ref.
Bosnia and Herzegovina; Croatia; Montenegro; North Macedonia; Serbia; Slovenia	Sport Klub	
Poland	Polsat Sport	
Greece	Nova Sports	

== Controversies ==
=== Opening ceremony ===
Ahead of the opening ceremony, a scuffle ensued in the VIP section of the Basra International Stadium. Sheikh Fahad al-Nasser, who represents Kuwait's emir, was unable to enter as a result, and the Kuwaiti delegation left the stadium soon after. The Iraqi representatives apologised for the incident.

=== Crowd stampede ===
A stampede outside Basra International Stadium, ahead of the final, killed one person and injured up to 60 others, according to reports. The incident was said to have been caused by thousands of fans without tickets turning up to the match early while the gates were still closed. In the afternoon, Basra authorities said the situation was under control and that the crowds had moved away from the stadium, and the final match went underway as scheduled.

== See also ==
- 2023 WAFF Championship
- 2022 EAFF E-1 Football Championship
- 2023 SAFF Championship
- 2022 AFF Championship
- 2023 AFC Asian Cup
