= Basra International Stadium =

Sports complex in Basra, Iraq

- اِسْتَاد الْبَصْرَة الدُّؤَلِيّ (in Arabic)
- ملعب جذع النخلة
- Basra International Stadium in 2022
- Interactive map of Basra International Stadium
- Full name: Basra International Stadium
- Location: Basra, Iraq
- Owner: Government of Iraq
- Capacity: 65,227
- Surface: Track & Field (Grass)
- Acreage: 2,770,000 GSF

Construction
- Groundbreaking: 1 January 2009
- Built: 2009–2013
- Opened: 12 October 2013
- Cost: £550 million
- Architect: 360 Architecture And Newport Global
- Project manager: Newport Global
- Structural engineer: Thornton Tomasetti
- Services engineer: Abdullah Al-Jaburi
- Main contractor: Abdullah Al-Jaburi

Tenant
- Iraq national football team

The Basra International Stadium (Arabic: مدينة البصرة الرياضية) is a sports complex in Basra, southern Iraq.

== Overview ==
Its construction started on 1 January 2009 and was completed on 12 October 2013. The sports city was funded by the government of Iraq with a budget of $550 million. It contains a main stadium with a capacity of 65,000 people, a secondary stadium with a capacity of 10,000, four five-star hotels and other sports-related facilities.

The contract for this project was given to Abdullah Al-Jaburi, a major Iraqi construction contractor, and two Domerkhian companies, 360 architecture and Newport Global.

The main stadium is a multilevel structure with 65,000 capacity, 20 suites, and 230 VIP seats. The complex also has VIP lounges and restaurants, spectator facilities, 205 VIP underground parking stalls and a tunnel connecting the main stadium to the secondary stadium. The secondary stadium has a capacity of 10,000. The basic structure was cast-in-place concrete with precast stadia seating. The roof structure is steel and cantilever 30 meters from the back support column of the upper deck with a 15-meter back-span. The stadium is enveloped with a curtain wall of multidirectional curved elements. The complex has 10,000 parking spaces in total.

The stadium is the tenant for Naft Al-Janoob and Al-Mina'a sports clubs who both play in Basra and contest the Basra Derby.

Iraq played their first international home game in four years at the stadium on 1 June 2017, beating Jordan 1–0. It was also the first international game played at the stadium.

On 10 October 2019, Iraq played their first competitive (not friendly) international game at home after eight years against Hong Kong. The result was a 2–0 win.

in 2023, a stampede outside Basra International Stadium in Iraq, hours before the Arabian Gulf Cup final match between Iraq and Oman, resulted in at least one death and several injured.

== Name ==
The official name is Basra International Stadium but an other appellation is also recurrent in Iraqi sports circles and commonly used in Arabic as a nickname : ملعب جذع النخلة which literally means Palm Trunk Stadium as well as Garage Huwayder or كراج حويدر. This denomination, also reflected in the external facade of the stadium which is inspired by the undulating bark of the date palm trees, is a clear reference to one of the characteristics of the city of Basra, well known for the cultivation and planting of vast fields of date palm trees.

== Gallery ==
Exterior view of the stadium at night

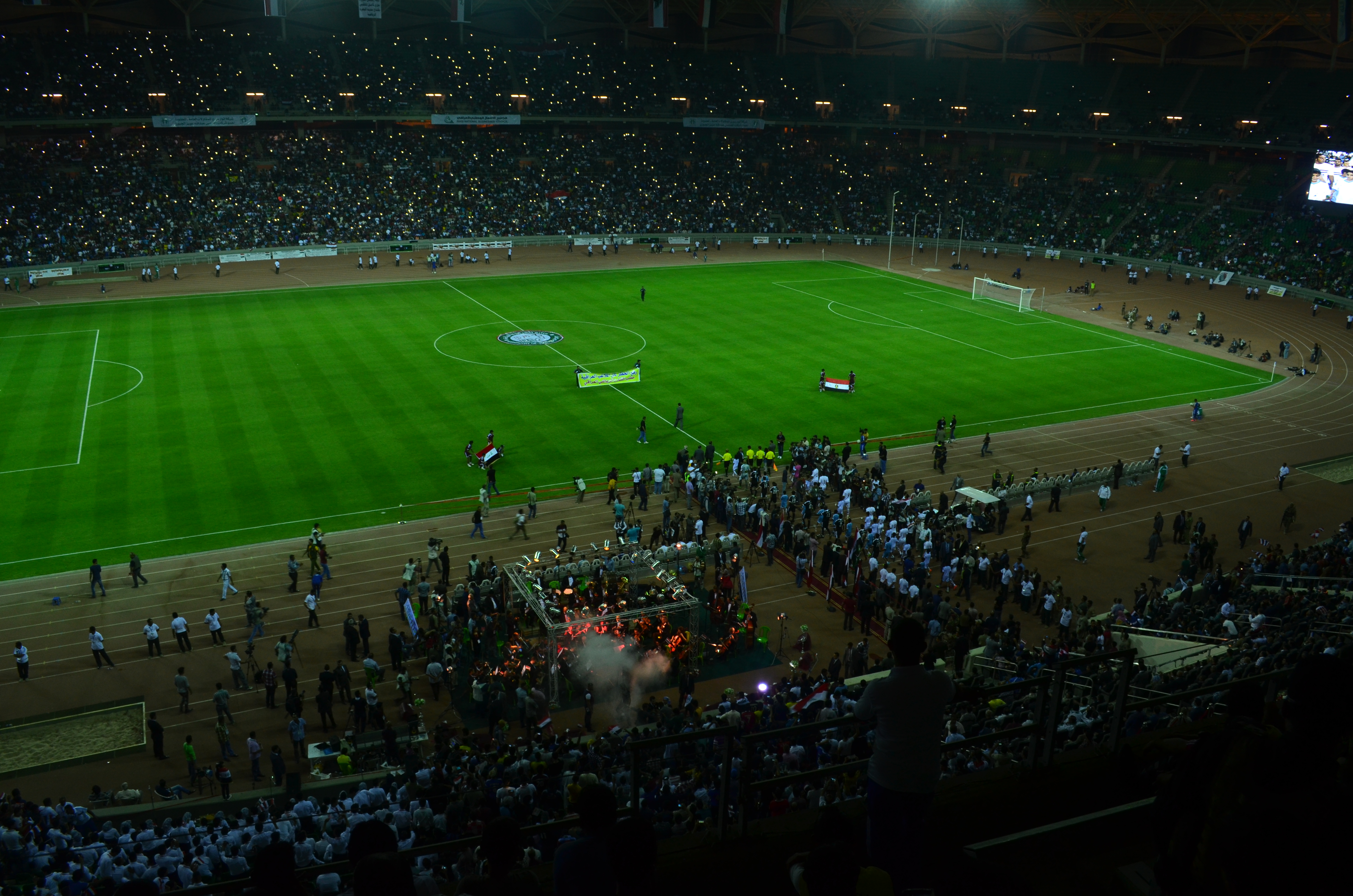
Flag bearers entering the pitch followed by both teams, Zamalek SC and Al-Zawra'a SC as well as a crowd of journalists and photographers, during the opening ceremony

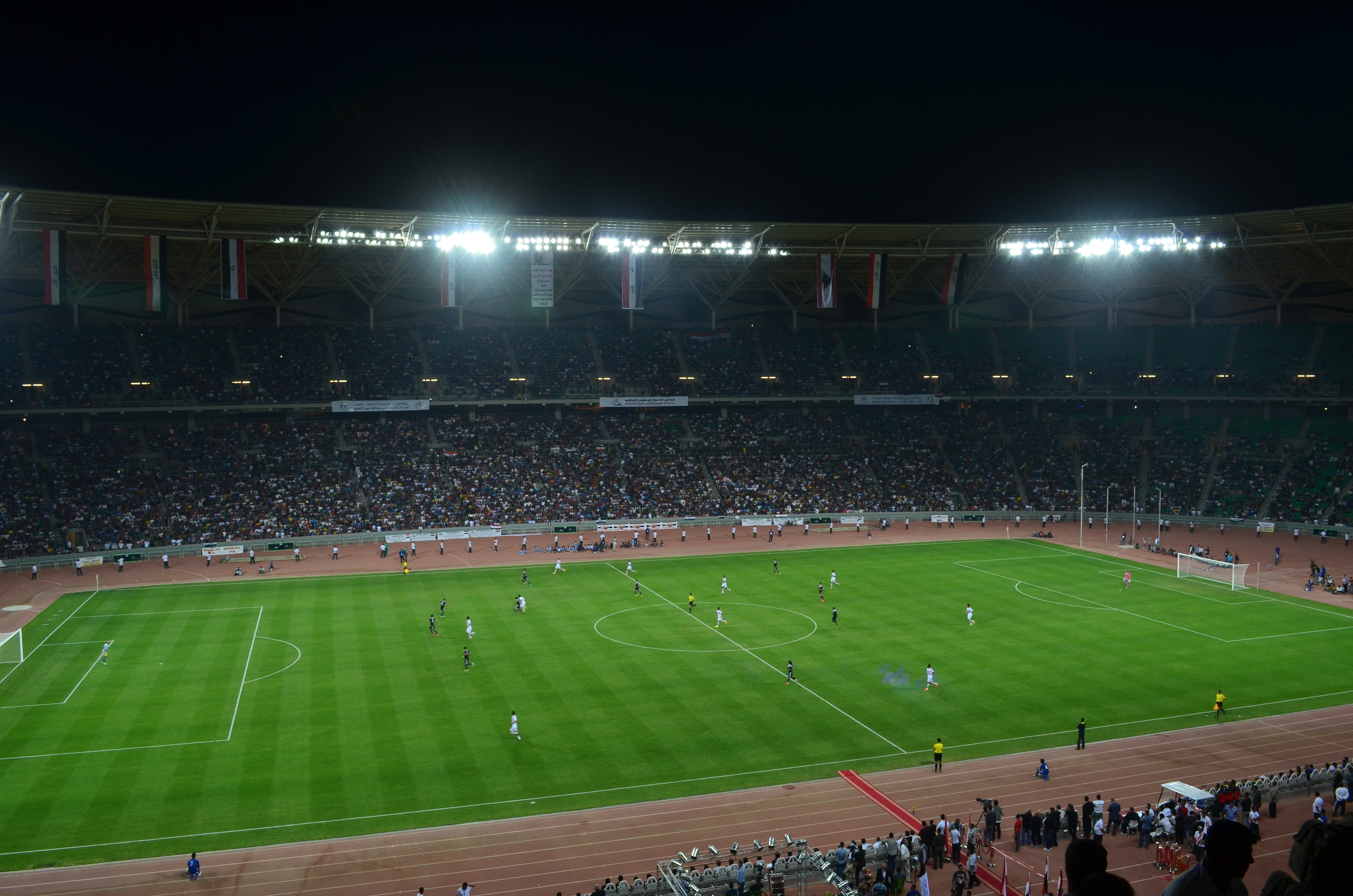
Second opening friendly match between Zamalek and Al-Zawra'a

== Events ==
- 2018 – International Friendship Championship
- 2018 – AFC Cup Final
- 2019 – International Friendship Championship
- 2021 – 2021 WAFF U-18 Championship
- 2023 – Arabian Gulf Cup
- 2026 – 2026 Basra International Tournament

== See also ==
- List of football stadiums in Iraq
- Lists of stadiums
