= 2018–19 Kuwaiti Premier League =

Kuwaiti Premier League
- Season: 2018–19
- Champions: Al Kuwait
- Relegated: Al-Jahra; Al-Fahaheel
- 2019 AFC Champions League 2019 AFC Cup: Al-Kuwait Al Qadsia; Al-Salmiya
- Matches: 90
- Goals: 263 (2.92 per match)

The 2018-19 Kuwaiti Premier League was the 57th edition of the tournament. Kuwait SC enter the season as the defending champions. Originally, the league was structured at 8 teams but the Kuwait FA announced the expansion of the league; so last season's 2017–18 relegated team Al Tadmahon, had been un-relegated and 2017–18 Kuwaiti Division One winners Al-Shabab SC and losing play-off team Al-Fahaheel FC will all compete this season.

== Teams ==
=== Lists of teams and locations ===
Team	Based	Home stadium	Capacity
Al Arabi	Kuwait City	Sabah Al-Salem Stadium	26,000
Al Qadsia	Kuwait City	Mohammed Al-Hamad Stadium	22,000
Kazma	Kuwait City	Al-Sadaqua Walsalam Stadium	21,500
Al Kuwait	Kuwait City	Al Kuwait Sports Club Stadium	18,500
Al-Shabab	Al-Ahmadi	Al-Ahmadi Stadium	18,000
Al Jahra	Jahra	Mubarak Al-Aiar Stadium	17,000
Al-Salmiya	Al Salmiya	Thamir Stadium	16,105
Al Tadhamon	Al Farwaniyah	Farwaniya Stadium	14,000
Al Nasar	Al Farwaniyah	Ali Al-Salem Al-Sabah Stadium	10,000
Al Fahaheel	Kuwait City	Fahaheel Stadium	2,000

=== Personnel and sponsorship ===
Team	Chairman	Head coach	Captain	Kit manufacturer	Shirt sponsor
Al-Arabi	Jamal Al-Kazmi	Hussam Al Sayed	Ali Maqseed	Erreà	Ahli Bank of Kuwait
Al-Fahaheel	Mohammed Hammad	Andrey Chernyshov	Abdullah Al Enazi	Givova	none
Kuwait	Marzouq Al-Ghanim		Hussain Hakem	HH	BMW
Qadsia	Shiekh Khaled Al-Fahad	Dalibor Starčević	Saleh Al Sheikh	Givova	Samsung
Kazma	Asaad Al-Banwan		Yousef Nasser	Erreà	Viva
Al-Salmiya	Shiekh Turki Al-Yousef	Hutam Dhelies		Adidas	The Sultan Center
Al-Shabab			Mohammed Ibrahim	Adidas	
Al-Tadhamon			Mohammed Ibrahim		
Al-Jahra	D'Ham AL-Shammari	Da Silva	Nino Santos	Givova	Viva
Al-Nasr				Givova	Viva

=== Foreign players ===
The total number of foreign players is restricted to five per club.

Club	Player 1	Player 2	Player 3	Player 4	Player 5	Former Players ^{1}
Al-Arabi	—	—	—	—	—	—
Al Fahaheel	(Ghana) Gershon Koffie	(Jordan) Munther Abu Amarah	(Jordan) Ibrahim Al-Zawahreh	(Morocco) Bouchaib Soufiani		(Egypt) Ahmed El Aash
Al-Kuwait	(Brazil) Lucão	(Ivory Coast) Jumaa Saeed	(Syria) Hamid Mido	(Tunisia) Hamza Lahmar	(Morocco) Issam El Adoua	(Tunisia) Saber Khalifa (Ghana) Mohammed Fatau
Al-Qadsia	(Cameroon) Ronald Ngah	(Gabon) Axel Méyé	(Nigeria) Ebiabowei Baker			
Kazma	(Brazil) Alex Lima	(Brazil) Vanderlei	(Sierra Leone) Medo Kamara	(Uganda) Denis Iguma		(Brazil) Hítalo Rogério (Peru) Hernán Hinostroza
Al-Salmiya	(Brazil) Marclei	(Jordan) Odai Al-Saify	(Jordan) Tareq Khattab	(Syria) Firas Al-Khatib		(Brazil) Patrick Fabiano (Cameroon) Guy Toindouba
Al-Shabab	(Brazil) Helder	(Brazil) Ricardinho	(Guinea) Naby Soumah	(Serbia) Igor Filipović	(Serbia) Aleksandar Trninić	(Brazil) Darlan (Egypt) Zizo
Al-Tadhamon	(Brazil) Alexandre Hans	(Brazil) Nixon Guylherme	(Brazil) Talisson	(Ghana) Jackson Owusu	(Syria) Hasan Owaid	
Al-Jahra	(Australia) Nicholas Olsen	(Burkina Faso) Moussa Dao	(Cameroon) Samuel Bitte	(Cameroon) Aaron Mbimbe	(Cameroon) Rudolph Ngombé	
Al Naser	(Bahrain) Sayed Baqer	(Ghana) Ernest Barfo	(Kenya) John Makwata	(Nigeria) Tunde Adeniji		

== League table ==
Pos	Team	Pld	W	D	L	GF	GA	GD	Pts	Qualification or relegation
1	Al-Kuwait (C)	18	13	3	2	52	14	+38	42	Qualification for AFC Champions League preliminary round 1 (Note: If the league champions cannot qualify for the AFC Champions League group stage, they will enter the AFC Cup group stage.)
2	Al-Qadsia	18	11	3	4	34	15	+19	36	Qualification for AFC Cup group stage (Note: Since league champions Al-Kuwait were also Kuwait Emir Cup winners, the league runners-up qualified for the AFC Cup group stage.)
3	Al-Salmiya	18	9	6	3	31	23	+8	33	
4	Kazma	18	7	7	4	30	24	+6	28	
5	Al-Arabi	18	7	6	5	27	24	+3	27	
6	Al-Nasar	18	4	6	8	16	26	−10	18	
7	Al-Tadhamon	18	4	5	9	18	27	−9	17	
8	Al-Shabab	18	4	4	10	18	39	−21	16	
9	Al-Jahra (R)	18	4	3	11	16	29	−13	15	Relegation to Kuwaiti Division One
10	Al-Fahaheel (R)	18	2	7	9	21	42	−21	13	Relegation to Kuwaiti Division One

Source: KFA, Goalzz
(C) Champions; (R) Relegated

== Statistics ==
=== Top scorers ===
Rank	Player	Club	Goals
1	(Kuwait) Hussein Al-Musawi	Al Arabi	17
2	(Ivory Coast) Jumaa Saeed	Kuwait SC	13
3	Nabi Somah	Al Shabab	11
4	(Timor-Leste) Patrick Fabiano	Al Salmiya	10
4	(Tunisia) Saber Khalifa	kuwait SC	10
4	(Kuwait) Yousef Nasser	Qadsia SC	10

=== Best player in the season ===
- the first Golden One Bader Al-Mutawa.
