= 2016–17 Kuwaiti Premier League =

Kuwaiti Premier League
- Season: 2016–17
- Champions: Kuwait SC
- 2018 AFC Champions League 2018 AFC Cup: Kuwait SC; Qadsia SC
- Arab Club Championship GCC Champions League Gulf Cup Winners Cup: Al-Nasr; Al-Arabi SC; Al-Salmiya SC
- Matches: 210
- Goals: 648 (3.09 per match)
- Biggest home win: Kuwait SC 9-1 Burgan SC
- Highest scoring: Kuwait SC 9-1 Burgan SC

The season started with 2 new teams Burgan SC and Al-Tadhamon SC.

Kuwait SC narrowly won the title by edging out rivals Al Qadsia with a 2–1 win over Al Salmiya clinched in injury time, just moments after Al Qadsia's final league match.

== Teams ==
=== Lists of teams and locations ===
Team	Based	Home stadium	Capacity
Al Arabi	Kuwait City	Sabah Al Salem Stadium	26,000
Al Fahaheel	Kuwait City	Fahaheel Stadium	2,000
Al Jahra	Jahra	Mubarak Al-Aiar Stadium	17,000
Al Kuwait	Kuwait City	Al Kuwait Sports Club Stadium	18,500
Al Nasar	Al Farwaniyah	Ali Al-Salem Al-Sabah Stadium	10,000
Al Qadsia	Kuwait City	Mohammed Al-Hamad Stadium	22,000
Al Sahel	Abu Hulayfah	Abu Halifa City Stadium	2,000
Al Sulaibikhat	Sulaibikhat	Al Salibikhaet Stadium	7,000
Al Salmiya	Al Salmiya	Thamir Stadium	16,105
Al Shabab	Al Ahmadi	Al-Ahmadi Stadium	18,000
Al Tadhamon	Farwaniya	Farwaniya Stadium	14,000
Yarmouk	Mishref	Mishref Stadium	12,000
Burgan	Al Farwaniyah	Ali Sabah Al-Salem Stadium	10,000
Kazma	Kuwait City	Al-Sadaqua Walsalam Stadium	21,500
Khaitan	Khaitan	Khaitan Stadium	10,000

=== Personnel and sponsorship ===
Team	Chairman	Head coach	Captain	Kit manufacturer	Shirt sponsor
Al-Arabi	Jamal Al-Kazmi	Fawzi Ibrahim	Ali Maqseed	Macron	Ahli Bank of Kuwait
Kuwait	Marzouq Al-Ghanim	Laurent Banide	Jarah Al Ateeqi	HH	BMW
Qadsia	Shiekh Khaled Al-Fahad	Dalibor Starčević	Saleh Al Sheikh	Givova	Samsung
Kazma	Asaad Al-Banwan	Unrevealed	Yousef Nasser	Erreà	Viva
Al-Salmiya	Shiekh Turki Al-Yousef	Hutam Dhelies	Brahima Keita	Adidas	The Sultan Center
Al-Tadhamon			Mohammed Ibrahim		
Al-Jahra	D'Ham AL-Shammari	Da Silva	Nino Santos	Givova	Viva
Al-Fahaheel	Mohammed Hammad	Andrey Chernyshov	Abdullah Al Enazi	Givova	none
Khaitan SC		Aleksandar Dixon Jovanovski		Zeus	Samsung
Al-Nasr				Givova	Viva
Sahel				Zeus	Viva
Al-Sulaibikhat			Mohammad Al Dabous	Erreà	LG
Al-Shabab				Uhlsport	None
Al-Yarmouk SC				Adidas	Samsung
Burgan SC	Hamlan Al-Hamlan	Hamad Al Harbi	Tarik Lugman	Givova	none

== Foreign players ==
Club	Player 1	Player 2	Player 3	Asian Player	Former Players ^{1}
Al-Arabi	(Tunisia) Amine Chermiti	(Brazil) Nino Santos	(Ivory Coast) Ibrahima Keita	(Iraq) Ali Hosni	(Brazil) Elias (France) Joël Damahou
Al-Fahaheel	(South Sudan) Atir Thomas	(Ivory Coast) Abdullah Coulibaly	(Ivory Coast) Habib Meïté		(Senegal) Abdou Kader Fall
Al-Jahra	(Cameroon) Guy Toindouba	(Brazil) Rogerinho			(Bosnia and Herzegovina) Jovica Stokić
Al-Nasr SC	(Ghana) Eric Epuko	(Nigeria) Ayrinsku Barifu		(Syria) Mahmoud Al Baher	
Al-Salmiya SC	(Brazil) Ygor	(Jordan) Saleh Rateb	(Jordan) Odai Al-Saify	(Jordan) Mahmoud Za'tara	
Al Tadhamon	(Brazil) Cristian Lucca	(Brazil) Ânderson Grafite		(Syria) Hamid Mido	(Brazil) Mauricio Nunes
Al Yarmouk	(Brazil) Samuel	(Nigeria) Prince Abedi			
Kuwait SC	(Ivory Coast) Juma Saeed	(Colombia) Jairo Palomino		(Oman) Abdul Sallam Amur	(Sierra Leone) Medo
Qadsia SC	(Brazil) David da Silva	(Argentina) Ricardo Blanco	(Jordan) Sharif Al-Nawaisheh	(Jordan) Ahmed Al-Reyahi	
Kazma SC	(Brazil) Alex Lima	(Brazil) Jaja	(Tunisia) Chaker Rguiî	(Brazil) (Timor-Leste) Patrick Fabiano	(Brazil) Diego Guerra
Burgan SC	(Tunisia) Wesam Idrees				(Liberia) Emile Damey

== League table ==
Pos	Team	Pld	W	D	L	GF	GA	GD	Pts	Qualification or relegation
1	Al Kuwait	28	21	6	1	70	17	+53	69	Qualification to Champions League preliminary round 1
2	Al Qadsia	28	21	4	3	57	17	+40	67	
3	Al Nasar	28	18	3	7	49	30	+19	57	
4	Al Arabi	28	14	9	5	55	36	+19	51	
5	Kazma	28	12	10	6	54	36	+18	46	
6	Al Salmiya	28	12	7	9	47	33	+14	43	
7	Al Jahra	28	12	4	12	52	51	+1	40	
8	Al Tadhamon	28	10	9	9	39	37	+2	39	
9	Al Fahaheel	28	11	5	12	39	43	−4	38	Relegation to Kuwaiti Division One
10	Al Shabab	28	6	11	11	39	46	−7	29	Relegation to Kuwaiti Division One
11	Yarmouk	28	6	8	14	40	51	−11	26	Relegation to Kuwaiti Division One
12	Al Sulaibikhat	28	6	5	17	32	44	−12	23	Relegation to Kuwaiti Division One
13	Khaitan	28	6	4	18	25	56	−31	22	Relegation to Kuwaiti Division One
14	Sahel	28	5	7	16	27	61	−34	22	Relegation to Kuwaiti Division One
15	Burgan	28	3	2	23	23	90	−67	11	Relegation to Kuwaiti Division One

Updated to match(es) played on 11 May 2017. Source:
Rules for classification: 1) Points; 2) Goal difference; 3) Goals scored; 4) Head-to-head points; 5) Head-to-head goal difference; 6) Head-to-head goals scored
