= 2017–18 Kuwaiti Premier League =

Kuwaiti Premier League
- Season: 2017–18
- Champions: Kuwait SC (14th title)
- 2019 AFC Champions League 2019 AFC Cup: Kuwait SC
- Matches: 84
- Goals: 241 (2.87 per match)

56th edition of the tournament. First season to have 8 teams after the return of Kuwaiti Division One.

== Teams ==
=== Lists of teams and locations ===
Team	Based	Home stadium	Capacity
Al Arabi	Kuwait City	Sabah Al-Salem Stadium	26,000
Al Jahra	Jahra	Mubarak Al-Aiar Stadium	17,000
Al Kuwait	Kuwait City	Al Kuwait Sports Club Stadium	18,500
Al Nasar	Al Farwaniyah	Ali Al-Salem Al-Sabah Stadium	10,000
Al Qadsia	Kuwait City	Mohammed Al-Hamad Stadium	22,000
Al Salmiya	Al Salmiya	Thamir Stadium	16,105
Al Tadhamon	Farwaniya	Farwaniya Stadium	14,000
Kazma	Kuwait City	Al-Sadaqua Walsalam Stadium	21,500

=== Personnel and sponsorship ===
Team	Chairman	Head coach	Captain	Kit manufacturer	Shirt sponsor
Al-Arabi	Jamal Al-Kazmi		Ali Maqseed	Erreà	Ahli Bank of Kuwait
Kuwait	Marzouq Al-Ghanim		Jarah Al Ateeqi	HH	BMW
Qadsia	Shiekh Khaled Al-Fahad	Dalibor Starčević	Saleh Al Sheikh	Givova	Samsung
Kazma	Asaad Al-Banwan		Yousef Nasser	Erreà	Viva
Al-Salmiya	Shiekh Turki Al-Yousef	Hutam Dhelies	Brahima Keita	Adidas	The Sultan Center
Al-Tadhamon			Mohammed Ibrahim		
Al-Jahra	D'Ham AL-Shammari	Da Silva	Nino Santos	Givova	Viva
Al-Nasr				Givova	Viva

== Foreign players ==
Club	Player 1	Player 2	Player 3	Asian Player	Former Players ^{1}
Al-Arabi	(Brazil) Léo	(Ivory Coast) Brahima Keita	(Nigeria) Bobby Clement	(Oman) Said Al-Ruzaiqi	
Al-Kuwait	(Ivory Coast) Juma Saeed	(Sierra Leone) Medó	(Syria) Hamid Mido	(Jordan) Baha' Faisal	(Brazil) Patrick Fabiano
Al-Qadsia	(Brazil) Renatinho	(Brazil) Tiago Orobó	(Ghana) Rashid Sumaila	(Jordan) Ahmed Al-Reyahi	
Kazma	(Brazil) Alex Lima	(Brazil) Vanderlei	(Peru) Hernán Hinostroza	(Timor-Leste) Juliano Mineiro	(Brazil) Joélson (Brazil) Jaja
Al-Salmiya	(Cameroon) Guy Toindouba	(Jordan) Odai Al-Saify	(Syria) Firas Al-Khatib	(Syria) Ahmad Deeb	
Al-Tadhamon	(France) Igor Djoman	(Ghana) Cofie Bekoe		(Jordan) Fadi Awad	(Brazil) Yago (Brazil) Bernardo (Brazil) Lucas Barboza
Al-Jahra	(Brazil) Renan Silva	(Cameroon) Aaron Mbimbe	(Cameroon) Ronald Ngah	(Jordan) Ahmed Hisham	(Brazil) Francisco
Al Naser	(Brazil) Francisco	(Ghana) Eric Epuko	(Ghana) Emmanuel Ofori	(Syria) Youssef Kalfa	

== League table ==
Pos	Team	Pld	W	D	L	GF	GA	GD	Pts	Qualification or relegation
1	Al Kuwait (C)	21	15	4	2	51	18	+33	49	Qualification to Champions League first preliminary round
2	Al Qadsia	21	9	6	6	37	25	+12	33	
3	Al Salmiya *	21	10	3	8	31	32	−1	33	
4	Kazma	21	6	11	4	29	28	+1	29	
5	Al Arabi	21	7	6	8	30	29	+1	27	
6	Al Nasar	21	8	2	11	30	39	−9	26	
7	Al Jahra	21	8	2	11	38	40	−2	26	Play off of Kuwaiti Division One
8	Al Tadhamon (R)	21	2	4	15	33	68	−35	10	Relegation to Kuwaiti Division One

Updated to match(es) played on 18 April 2018. Source: FIFA
Rules for classification: 1) Points; 2) Head-to-head points; 3) Head-to-head goal difference; 4) Head-to-head goals scored; 5) Goal difference; 6) Goals scored
(C) Champions; (R) Relegated
- Al-Salmiya SC lost 3 points by the decision of FIFA on 24 of June 2018 now stand on 30 points.

== Play-off ==
In this Seasons Play-Off match to determine who's the 8th team of the 2018–19 Kuwaiti Premier League, Is between Al-Jahra SC and Al-Fahaheel FC

22 April 2018	Al-Jahra SC	6 – 0	Al-Fahaheel FC	Kuwait City, Kuwait

== Awards ==
=== Top Scorer ===
Number	Player	Club	Goals
1	Faisal Ajab	Al Tadhmon SC	15
2	Yaqoub Al-Tararwa	Kuwait SC	13
2	Ronald	Al-Jahra SC	13
3	Firas Al-Khatib	Al-Salmiya SC	12
4	Francisco Wagsley	Al-Nasr SC; Al-Jahra SC	11

=== Top Assist Provider ===
Number	Player	Club	Assists
1	Faisal Zayid	Al-Jahra SC	11
2	Sa'ad Al-Mutairi	Al Tadhmon SC	8
3	Bader Al-Mutawa	Qadsia SC	6
4	Mashari Al Azmi	Kazma SC	5

=== Player of the Month ===
Month	Player	Club	Ref
September	Firas Al-Khatib	Al-Salmiya SC	
October	Faisal Zayid	Al-Jahra SC	
November	Not Awarded due to 23rd Gulf Cup; Crown Prince Cup	-	
December	Not Awarded due to 23rd Gulf Cup; Crown Prince Cup	-	
January	Not Awarded due to 23rd Gulf Cup; Crown Prince Cup	-	
February	Bader Al-Fadhel	Al-Arabi SC	
March	Abdullah Mawee	Qadsia SC	
April	Abdulaziz Nasari	Qadsia SC	
