= 2023–24 Kuwaiti Premier League =

Kuwaiti Premier League
- Season: 2023–24
- Dates: 24 August 2023 – 27 May 2024
- Champions: Al-Kuwait (19)
- Relegated: Al-Jahra; Al-Shabab
- Matches: 132
- Goals: 401 (3.04 per match)
- Top goalscorer: (Morocco) Hamza Khabba (21 goals)

The 2023–24 season for the Kuwait Premier League was the 62nd season of professional football played in Kuwait. Kuwait SC are the defending champions.

== Teams ==
=== Stadia and locations ===
Team	City/Town	Stadium	Capacity
Al Arabi	Mansouria,	Sabah Al Salem Stadium	15,000
Fahaheel	Fahaheel	Al-Ahmadi Stadium Fahaheel Stadium	18,000 2,000
Al-Jahra	Al Jahra	Mubarak Al-Aiar Stadium	17,000
Kazma	Adiliya	Al-Sadaqua Walsalam Stadium	26,500
Khaitan	Khaitan	Khaitan Stadium	11,000
Al-Kuwait	Kaifan	Al Kuwait SC Stadium	16,500
Al Naser	Ardiya	Ali Al-Salem Stadium	10,000
Al-Qadsia	Hawalli	Mohammed Al-Hamad Stadium	22,000
Al-Salmiya	Salmiya	Thamir Stadium	16,105
Al-Shabab	Ahmadi	Al-Ahmadi Stadium	18,000

== Personnel and kits ==
Note: Flags indicate national team as has been defined under FIFA eligibility rules. Players may hold more than one non-FIFA nationality.

Team	Head coach	Captain	Kit manufacturer	Shirt sponsor
Al Arabi	(Bosnia and Herzegovina) Darko Nestorović	(Kuwait) Sulaiman Abdulghafour	Unique	Al Ahli Bank of Kuwait
Fahaheel	(Syria) Firas Al-Khatib	(Kuwait) Fawaz Al Rashidi	Solosport	
Al Jahra	(Kuwait) Abdullah Al Mutairi	(Qatar) Abdelkarim Hassan	Zeus	
Kazma	(Kuwait) Mohammed Dehiles	(Kuwait) Hussain Kankoune	Nike	
Khaitan	(Romania) Florin Motroc		Kelme	
Al-Kuwait	(Tunisia) Nabil Maâloul	(Kuwait) Fahad Al Rashidi	Solosport	BMW
Al Naser	(Kuwait) Dhahir Al-Adwani	(Kuwait) Mesh'al Fawaz	Joma	
Al-Qadsia	(Kuwait) Mohammed Mashaan	(Kuwait) Bader Al-Mutawa	Erreà	Switch Electronics
Al-Salmiya	(Croatia) Ante Miše	(Kuwait) Fawaz AL-Otaibi	Solosport	Atyab Al Marshoud
Al Shabab	(Tunisia) Nacif Beyaoui	(Kuwait) Zaid Zakaria	Kelme	

== Managerial changes ==
Team	Outgoing manager/coach	Manner of departure	Date of vacancy	Incoming manager/coach	Date of appointment
Al Arabi	(Bosnia and Herzegovina) Rusmir Cviko	End of contract	28 May 2023	(Germany) Thomas Brdarić	26 June 2023
Al Naser	(Jordan) Jamal Mahmoud	End of contract	7 May 2023	(Kuwait) Dhahir Al-Adwani	6 July 2023
Kazma	(Romania) Ilie Stan	End of contract	31 May 2023	(Brazil) Sérgio Farias	6 July 2023
Al Shabab	(Kuwait) Eid Sabge	End of contract	31 July 2023	(Montenegro) Slavoljub Bubanja	31 July 2023
Kazma	(Brazil) Sérgio Farias	End of contract	11 September 2023	(Portugal) Francisco Chaló	18 September 2023
Al Arabi	(Germany) Thomas Brdarić	Sacked	2 November 2023	(Bosnia and Herzegovina) Darko Nestorović	4 November 2023
Al Jahra	(Brazil) Ginés de Silva	Sacked	1 December 2023	(Kuwait) Abdullah Al Mutairi	2 December 2023
Khaitan	(Kuwait) Ibrahim Obaid	Sacked	2 December 2023	(Romania) Florin Motroc	3 December 2023
Al-Kuwait	(Serbia) Boris Bunjak	Sacked	3 December 2023	(Tunisia) Nabil Maâloul	6 December 2023
Kazma	(Portugal) Francisco Chaló	Sacked	27 December 2023	(Kuwait) Mohammed Dehiles	27 December 2023
Al-Qadsia	(Kuwait) Mohammed Ebrahim	Sanitary conditions	6 January 2024	(Kuwait) Mohammed Mashaan	11 January 2024
Al-Salmiya	(Kuwait) Mohammed Mashaan	End of contract	10 January 2024	(Croatia) Ante Miše	12 January 2024
Al Shabab	(Montenegro) Slavoljub Bubanja	Sacked	16 February 2024	(Tunisia) Nacif Beyaoui	5 March 2024

== Foreign players ==
Teamss can register a total of five foreign players throughout the season, in addition to two Kuwaiti-born players, but five of them are allowed to participate in the match.

Team	Player 1	Player 2	Player 3	Player 4	Player 5	Born in Kuwait	Former Players
Al Arabi	(Algeria) Imadeddine Boubekeur	(Morocco) Hamza Khabba	(Morocco) Walid Sabbar	(Nigeria) Anayo Iwuala	(Tunisia) Aymen Sfaxi	(Syria) Gomaa Aboud (Saudi Arabia) Abdulrahman Al-Dhaferi	(Algeria) Sofiane Bouchar (Senegal) Mamadou Thiam
Fahaheel	(Brazil) Júlio César	(Brazil) Uilliam	(Brazil) Vitão	(Syria) Nasouh Al Nakdali	(Tunisia) Abderrahman Hanchi	(Jordan) Ahmed Al-Riyahi (Syria) Mohammed Alyan	(Brazil) Luiz Fernando
Al-Jahra	(Brazil) Igor Salatiel	(Brazil) Rodrigo Yuri	(Ivory Coast) Wilfried Kanon	(Libya) Anas Alshibli			(Qatar) Abdelkarim Hassan
Kazma	(Algeria) Reda Benchaa	(Guinea-Bissau) Toni Silva	(Jordan) Ahmad Ersan	(Palestine) Michel Termanini	(Nigeria) Benjamin Teidi		(Brazil) Douglas Valle (Algeria) Imadeddine Azzi
Khaitan	(Brazil) Johnathan Pereira	(Brazil) Victor Lisboa	(Brazil) Wellington	(Rwanda) Kevin Muhire	(Ivory Coast) Othman Fani		(Brazil) Rodrigo Dias
Al-Kuwait	(Bahrain) Mohamed Marhoon	(Democratic Republic of the Congo) Arsène Zola	(Republic of the Congo) Guy Mbenza	(Morocco) Mehdi Berrahma	(Tunisia) Yassine Amri	(Iran) Ali Pourdara (Egypt) Amro Abdelfatah	(Tunisia) Bilel Ifa (Tunisia) Taha Yassine Khenissi
Al Naser	(Algeria) Issad Lakdja	(Libya) Almuetasim Allafi	(Colombia) Hansel Zapata	(Syria) Omar Midani	(Syria) Abdullah Al Shami		
Al-Qadsia	(Oman) Abdullah Fawaz	(Libya) Mohammed Soulah	(Nigeria) Daniel Ajibola	(Argentina) Sergio Vittor	(Ivory Coast) Ibrahima Tandia	(Egypt) Abdullah Motawea (Iran) Abdulaziz Nassari	(Tunisia) Youssef Ben Souda
Salmiya	(Brazil) Alex Lima	(The Gambia) Sang Per Mendy	(Ghana) Izaka Aboudou	(Libya) AlSanousi AlHadi	(Austria) Srđan Spiridonović		(Senegal) Ousseynou Gueye (Brazil) Sebá
Al Shabab	(Tunisia) Bilel Ifa	(Tunisia) Youssef BenSouda	(Colombia) Carlos Rivas	(Senegal) Birahim Gaye	(Estonia) Bogdan Vaštšuk		(Senegal) Oussainou N'Diaye (Senegal) Omar Wade (Senegal) Mame Saher Thioune

== Main league table ==
The main league, consisting of 10 teams in which the top six clubs competing in the league and the last four clubs qualifying for the relegation group are determined.

Pos	Team	Pld	W	D	L	GF	GA	GD	Pts	Qualification or relegation
1	Al-Kuwait (Q)	18	13	4	1	46	17	+29	43	Qualification for Championship Play-offs
2	Al-Arabi (Q)	18	13	3	2	47	18	+29	42	Qualification for Championship Play-offs
3	Al-Qadsia (Q)	18	11	6	1	34	10	+24	39	Qualification for Championship Play-offs
4	Al-Salmiya (Q)	18	6	6	6	21	24	−3	24	Qualification for Championship Play-offs
5	Al-Nasar (Q)	18	7	3	8	31	27	+4	24	Qualification for Championship Play-offs
6	Al-Fahaheel (Q)	18	6	5	7	25	27	−2	23	Qualification for Championship Play-offs
7	Kazma (R)	18	5	5	8	20	32	−12	20	Qualification for Relegation play-offs
8	Al-Shabab (R)	18	4	2	12	14	43	−29	14	Qualification for Relegation play-offs
9	Khaitan (R)	18	2	6	10	11	31	−20	12	Qualification for Relegation play-offs
10	Al-Jahra (R)	18	2	2	14	17	37	−20	8	Qualification for Relegation play-offs

Updated to match(es) played on 8 April 2024. Source:
(Q) Qualified for the phase indicated; (R) Relegated

== Championship play-offs ==
Pos	Team	Pld	W	D	L	GF	GA	GD	Pts	Qualification or relegation
1	Al-Kuwait (C)	28	21	6	1	72	21	+51	69	Qualification for AFC Champions League Two qualifying play-off
2	Al-Arabi	28	17	8	3	62	27	+35	59	Qualification for the AFC Challenge League group stage
3	Al-Qadsia	28	15	9	4	51	25	+26	54	Qualification for the AGCFF Gulf Club Champions League group stage
4	Al-Salmiya	28	9	9	10	35	41	−6	36	
5	Al-Fahaheel	28	8	9	11	37	44	−7	33	
6	Al-Nasar	28	7	4	17	43	59	−16	25	

Updated to match(es) played on 27 May 2024. Source:
(C) Champions

== Relegation-offs ==
Pos	Team	Pld	W	D	L	GF	GA	GD	Pts	
1	Kazma	24	10	5	9	38	39	−1	35	
2	Khaitan	24	5	6	13	17	39	−22	21	
3	Al-Shabab (R)	24	6	2	16	18	50	−32	20	Relegation to Kuwaiti Division One
4	Al-Jahra (R)	24	4	2	18	28	54	−26	14	Relegation to Kuwaiti Division One

Updated to match(es) played on 27 May 2024. Source:
(R) Relegated

== Statistics ==
=== Top scorers ===
As of 27 May 2024

Rank	Player	Team	Goals
1	(Morocco) Hamza Khabba	Al Arabi	21
2	(Colombia) Hansel Zapata	Al Naser	20
3	(Brazil) Uilliam	Fahaheel	14
4	(Kuwait) Bader Al-Mutawa	Al-Qadsia	13
4	(Kuwait) Mohammed Daham	Al-Kuwait	13
6	(Kuwait) Yousef Naser	Al-Kuwait	12
7	(Ghana) Issaka Abudu Diarra	Al-Salmiya	10

== Awards ==
=== Round awards ===
Round	Player of the Round	
Round	Player	Club
1	(Kuwait) Ali Fadel	Khaitan
2	(Kuwait) Ahmed Al-Dhefiri	Al-Kuwait
3	(Kuwait) Khalid Al-Ajaji	Al-Nasr
4	(Kuwait) Mohammed Daham	Al-Kuwait
5	(Kuwait) Abdullah Al-Otaibi	Al-Shabab
6	(Kuwait) Sami Al-Sanea	Al-Kuwait
7	(Kuwait) Khaled Al-Rashidi	Al-Qadsia
8	(Kuwait) Bandar Al Salamah	Al Arabi
9	(Kuwait) Sultan Al Enezi	Al Arabi
10	(Kuwait) Mohammed Daham	Al-Kuwait
11	(Kuwait) Ahmad Raheel	Al-Fahaheel
12	(Kuwait) Bader Al-Mutawa	Al-Qadsia
13	(Kuwait) Mohammed Daham	Al-Kuwait
14	(Kuwait) Eid Al-Rashidi	Al-Qadsia
15	(Kuwait) Mohammed Daham	Al-Kuwait
16	(Kuwait) Othman Al Shemeri	Al-Jahra
17	(Kuwait) Yaqoub Al-Tararwa	Khaitan
18	(Kuwait) Bader Al-Mutawa	Al-Qadsia
19	(Kuwait) Bader Al-Mutawa	Al-Qadsia
20	(Kuwait) Eid Al-Rasheedi	Al-Qadsia
21	(Kuwait) Yousef Naser	Al-Kuwait
22	(Kuwait) Yousef Naser	Al-Kuwait
23	(Kuwait) Khaled Al-Rashidi	Al-Qadsia
24	(Kuwait) Ahmed Al-Dhefiri	Al-Kuwait
25	(Kuwait) Ahmed Al Khaldi	Al-Fahaheel
26	(Kuwait) Ahmed Al-Dhefiri	Al-Kuwait
27	(Kuwait) Mohammed Daham	Al-Kuwait
28	(Kuwait) Yousef Naser	Al-Kuwait
