= 2019–20 Kuwaiti Premier League =

Kuwaiti Premier League
- Season: 2019–20
- Champions: Al Kuwait
- Relegated: Al-Yarmouk SC; Al Tadhamon
- 2020 AFC Champions League 2020 AFC Cup: Al-Kuwait Al Qadsia
- Matches: 90
- Goals: 263 (2.92 per match)

The 2019–20 Kuwaiti Premier League was the 58th edition of the tournament. Kuwait SC were the defending champions.

== Teams ==
Team	Based	Home stadium	Capacity
Al Arabi	Kuwait City	Sabah Al-Salem Stadium	26,000
Al Qadsia	Kuwait City	Mohammed Al-Hamad Stadium	22,000
Kazma	Kuwait City	Al-Sadaqua Walsalam Stadium	21,500
Al Kuwait	Kuwait City	Al Kuwait Sports Club Stadium	18,500
Al-Shabab	Al-Ahmadi	Al-Ahmadi Stadium	18,000
Al-Sahel	Abu Halifa	Abu Halifa City Stadium	2,000
Al-Salmiya	Al Salmiya	Thamir Stadium	16,105
Al Tadhamon	Al Farwaniyah	Farwaniya Stadium	14,000
Al Nasar	Al Farwaniyah	Ali Al-Salem Al-Sabah Stadium	10,000
Al-Yarmouk	Mishref	Mishref Stadium	12,000

== Foreign players ==
Club	Player 1	Player 2	Player 3	Player 4	Player 5	Former Players
Al-Arabi	(Ghana) Issah Yakubu	(Ivory Coast) Henri Doumbia	(Libya) Al-Sanousi Al-Hadi	(Spain) Xavi Torres	(Syria) Ahmad Al Saleh	(Syria) Jumma Abboud
Al-Kuwait	(Brazil) Bismark	(Iraq) Alaa Abbas	(Iraq) Amjad Attwan	(Ivory Coast) Jumaa Saeed	(Mali) Abdoul Sissoko	(Colombia) Diego Calderón (Syria) Omar Midani
Al-Nasr	(Bahrain) Sayed Dhiya Saeed	(Brazil) Anderson Lopes	(Jordan) Ahmed Al-Riyahi	(Jordan) Baha' Abdel-Rahman	(Lebanon) Kassem El Zein	(Bahrain) Sayed Baqer (Guinea) Naby Soumah (Saudi Arabia) Taisir Al-Jassim
Al-Qadsia	(Albania) Lorenc Trashi	(Ghana) Rashid Sumaila	(Jordan) Odai Al-Saify	(Nigeria) James Okwuosa	(Palestine) Oday Dabbagh	(Brazil) Lucas Gaúcho (Brazil) Ronir de Souza (Jordan) Ahmed Al-Riyahi
Al-Sahel	(Cameroon) Franck Mbarga	(Senegal) Olivier Guy Ndiaye				(Ivory Coast) Ahmed Desire Titty (Senegal) Babacar Ndiour
Al-Salmiya	(Azerbaijan) Kamal Mirzayev	(Brazil) Patrick Fabiano	(Brazil) Ronir de Souza	(Ghana) Amidu Salifu		(Brazil) Marclei Santos (Jordan) Odai Al-Saify (Jordan) Tareq Khattab (Palestine) Oday Dabbagh
Al-Shabab	(Brazil) Roberto Santana	(Ghana) Vincent Atinga	(Senegal) Birahim Gaye	(Senegal) Ousseynou Gueye		(Brazil) Helder Lobato
Al-Tadhamon	(Brazil) Alexandre Hans	(France) Alan Logombe	(Ivory Coast) Hermann Kouao	(Montserrat) Alex Dyer		(Brazil) Nixon Guylherme (Ghana) Jackson Owusu
Al-Yarmouk	(Gabon) Franck Obambou	(Morocco) Youssef Sekour	(Togo) Dové Womé			(Cameroon) Yannick N'Djeng (Tunisia) Samir Laâroussi
Kazma	(Brazil) André Penalva	(Ivory Coast) Jean Zirignon	(Ivory Coast) Vivien Assie	(Togo) Lalawélé Atakora	(Togo) Sadat Ouro-Akoriko	(Brazil) Bruno Paulo (Brazil) Feijão (Cameroon) Lionel Enguene (Uganda) Denis Iguma

== League table ==
Pos	Team	Pld	W	D	L	GF	GA	GD	Pts	Qualification or relegation
1	Al-Kuwait (C)	18	13	4	1	49	12	+37	43	Qualification for AFC Cup Play-off round
2	Al-Qadsia	18	10	6	2	29	11	+18	36	
3	Al-Salmiya	18	11	2	5	42	26	+16	35	
4	Al-Arabi	18	9	4	5	26	21	+5	31	
5	Kazma	18	9	1	8	29	25	+4	28	
6	Al-Nasar	18	6	3	9	18	22	−4	21	
7	Al-Sahel	18	4	6	8	16	36	−20	18	
8	Al-Shabab	18	4	5	9	17	32	−15	17	
9	Al-Tadhamon (R)	18	3	4	11	21	39	−18	13	Relegation to Kuwaiti Division One
10	Al-Yarmouk (R)	18	1	5	12	16	39	−23	8	Relegation to Kuwaiti Division One

Source: KFA, Goalzz
(C) Champions; (R) Relegated

== Statistics ==
=== Top scorers ===
Rank	Name	Team	Goals
1	(Brazil) Patrick Fabiano	Al-Salmiya	14
1	(Kuwait) Yousef Nasser	Kuwait	14
2	(Senegal) Birahim Gaye	Al-Shabab	10
3	(Kuwait) Bader Al-Mutawa	Qadsia	9
3	(Ivory Coast) Ahmed Desire Titty	Al Sahel	9
4	(Ivory Coast) Jumaa Saeed	Kuwait	8

=== Best player in the season ===
- Ahmed Al-Dhefiri
