= 2021–22 Kuwaiti Premier League =

Kuwait Premier League
- Season: 2021–22
- Champions: Al-Kuwait (17)
- Relegated: Al-Yarmouk; Al-Shabab
- Matches: 90
- Goals: 253 (2.81 per match)
- Top goalscorer: (Kuwait) Shabaib Al-Khaldi (11 goals)

60th edition of the tournament. Al-Arabi SC are the defending champions.

== Teams ==
Team	Based	Home stadium	Capacity
Al Arabi	Mansouria	Sabah Al-Salem Stadium	26,000
Al-Fahaheel	Al-Ahmadi	Fahaheel Stadium	2,000
Kazma	Adailiya	Al-Sadaqua Walsalam Stadium	21,500
Al Kuwait	Kaifan	Al Kuwait Sports Club Stadium	18,500
Al Nasar	Al Farwaniyah	Ali Al-Salem Al-Sabah Stadium	10,000
Al Qadsia	Kuwait City	Mohammed Al-Hamad Stadium	22,000
Al-Shabab	Al-Ahmadi	Al-Ahmadi Stadium	18,000
Al-Salmiya	Hawalli	Thamir Stadium	16,105
Al-Tadhamon	Al Farwaniyah	Farwaniya Stadium	14,000
Al-Yarmouk	Mishref	Abdullah Alkhalifa Alsabah Satduim	15,000

== League table ==
Pos	Team	Pld	W	D	L	GF	GA	GD	Pts	Qualification or relegation
1	Al-Kuwait (C)	18	13	3	2	37	11	+26	42	Qualification for AFC Cup Group stage
2	Kazma	18	10	5	3	24	17	+7	35	
3	Al-Arabi	18	10	2	6	32	23	+9	32	
4	Al-Salmiya	18	9	4	5	32	24	+8	31	
5	Al-Qadsia	18	9	3	6	25	23	+2	30	
6	Al-Nasar	18	7	3	8	28	24	+4	24	
7	Al-Fahaheel	18	4	6	8	16	26	−10	18	
8	Al-Tadhamon	18	4	4	10	30	41	−11	16	
9	Al-Yarmouk (R)	18	3	3	12	20	35	−15	12	Relegation to Kuwaiti Division One
10	Al-Shabab (R)	18	3	3	12	9	29	−20	12	Relegation to Kuwaiti Division One

Updated to match(es) played on 25 April 2022. Source:
(C) Champions; (R) Relegated

== Statistics ==
=== Top scorers ===
Rank	Name	Team	Goals
1	(Kuwait) Shabaib Al-Khaldi	Kazma	11
2	(Colombia) Carlos Rivas	Al-Yarmouk	10
3	(Togo) Euloge Placca Fessou	Al-Tadamon	8
3	(Tunisia) Taha Yassine Khenissi	Al-Kuwait	8
5	(Brazil) Patrick Fabiano	Al-Salmiya	7
5	(Morocco) Mehdi Berrahma	Al-Kuwait	7
5	(Nigeria) Dennis Sesugh	Al-Nasr	7
