= Shabaib Al-Khaldi =

Kuwaiti footballer (born 1998)

Personal information
- Full name: Shabaib Abdulaziz Shabaib Al-Khaldi
- Date of birth: 11 August 1998 (age 28)
- Place of birth: Kuwait
- Height: 1.85 m (6 ft 1 in)
- Position: Forward

Team information
- Current team: Kazma
- Number: 20

Senior career*
Years	Team	Apps	(Gls)
2015–2018	Al Sahel	44	(17)
2018–	Kazma	92	(48)
2023–2024	→ Hatta (loan)	6	(0)

International career^{‡}
2019–	Kuwait	43	(16)
- * Club domestic league appearances and goals as of 2 January 2024 ‡ National team caps and goals as of 13 November 2026

Shabaib Al-Khaldi (born 11 August 1998) is a Kuwaiti professional footballer who plays for Kazma and the Kuwaiti national team.

== Club career ==
Al-Khaldi began his professional career with Al Sahel before joining Kazma in 2018, where he has been a key player. During the 2021–22 season, he emerged as the top scorer in the Kuwait Premier League, showcasing his goal-scoring prowess. Additionally, he played a crucial role in Kazma's victory in the Kuwait Emir Cup in 2022.

In February 2024 he was Suspended for 2 years for missing the seasonal anti-doping drug test. In July 2025 his suspension was reduced to August 2025.

== International career ==
He debuted internationally on 14 November 2019, at the 2022 FIFA World Cup qualification, and scored his first goal in a major competition for Kuwait against Chinese Taipei in a 9–0 victory.

== Club career statistics ==
As of 3 November 2023

Appearances and goals by club, season and competition
Club	Season	League			National Cup		Continental		Other		Total	
Club	Season	Division	Apps	Goals	Apps	Goals	Apps	Goals	Apps	Goals	Apps	Goals
Al-Sahel	2015–16	KPL	31	4								4
Al-Sahel	2016–17	KPL	31	10		4						14
Al-Sahel	2017–18	KD1	13	3						1		4
Total			44	17		4				1	55	22
Kazma	2018–19	KPL	67	2		0						2
Kazma	2019–20	KPL	67	5		4				1		10
Kazma	2020–21	KPL	67	12		1						13
Kazma	2021–22	KPL	67	11		1						12
Kazma	2022–23	KPL	20	18		1				3		22
Kazma	2023–24	KPL	0	0								0
Total			87	48		7				4		59
Hatta (loan)	2023–24	UAE PL	3	0	—		—		1	0	4	0
Hatta (loan)	Total		3	0	0	0	0	0	1	0	4	0
Career total			134	65		11				5		81

== International goals ==
Scores and results list Kuwait's goal tally first.

No.	Date	Venue	Opponent	Score	Result	Competition
1.	14 November 2019	Al Kuwait Sports Club Stadium, Kuwait City, Kuwait	Chinese Taipei	7–0	9–0	2022 FIFA World Cup qualification
2.	29 March 2021	Police Officers' Club Stadium, Dubai, United Arab Emirates	Lebanon	1–0	1–1	Friendly
3.	23 May 2021	The Sevens Stadium, Dubai, United Arab Emirates	Malaysia	3–1	4–1	Friendly
4.	29 January 2022	Jaber Al-Ahmad International Stadium, Kuwait City, Kuwait	Libya	2–0	2–0	Friendly
5.	14 January 2023	Basra International Stadium, Basra, Iraq	Bahrain	1–1	1–1	25th Arabian Gulf Cup
6.	28 March 2023	Jaber Al-Ahmad International Stadium, Kuwait City, Kuwait	Tajikistan	2–0	2–1	Friendly
7.	21 June 2023	Sree Kanteerava Stadium, Bangalore, India	Nepal	2–0	3–1	2023 SAFF Championship
8.	4 July 2023	Sree Kanteerava Stadium, Bangalore, India	India	1–0	1–1	2023 SAFF Championship Final
9.	7 September 2023	Police Officers' Club Stadium, Dubai, United Arab Emirates	Bahrain	2–0	3–1	Friendly
10.	7 September 2023	Police Officers' Club Stadium, Dubai, United Arab Emirates	Bahrain	3–0	3–1	Friendly
11.	21 November 2023	Police Officers' Club Stadium, Dubai, United Arab Emirates	Syria	1–1	2–1	Friendly
12.	21 November 2023	Police Officers' Club Stadium, Dubai, United Arab Emirates	Syria	2–1	2–1	Friendly
13.	21 November 2023	Prince Mohamed bin Fahd Stadium, Dammam, Saudi Arabia	Afghanistan	1–0	4–0	2026 FIFA World Cup qualification
14.	21 November 2023	Prince Mohamed bin Fahd Stadium, Dammam, Saudi Arabia	Afghanistan	3–0	4–0	2026 FIFA World Cup qualification
15.	29 September 2026	Prince Abdullah Al-Faisal Sports City Stadium, Jeddah, Saudi Arabia	Oman	1–0	1–3	27th Arabian Gulf Cup
16.	13 November 2026	Al-Sadaqua Walsalam Stadium, Kuwait City, Kuwait	Syria	1–0	3–0	Friendly

== Honours ==
Kazma

- Kuwait Emir Cup: 2022

Individual

- Kuwait Premier League top scorer: 2021–22
