= 2024–25 Kuwaiti Division One =

Kuwaiti Division One
- Season: 2025
- Dates: January 5th – May 18th
- Champions: Al-Jahra
- Promoted: Al-Jahra; Al-Shabab
- All statistics correct as of July 22nd.

39th edition of the tournament. The league was supposed to start on the 18th of August but was delayed to start after the 2024 Arabian Gulf Cup.

== Changes ==
The following teams have changed divisions since the 2023–24 season:

=== To Division One ===
Relegated from Kuwait Premier League

- Al-Jahra
- Al-Shabab

=== From Division One ===
Promoted to Kuwait Premier League

- Al-Yarmouk
- Al-Tadamon

== Teams ==
=== Stadia and locations ===
Club	City/Town	Stadium	Capacity
Burgan	Ardiya	Ali Al-Salem Stadium	10,000
Al-Jahra	Jahra	Al Shabab Mubarak Alaiar Stadium	17,000
Al-Sahel	Abu Hulayfah	Abu Halifa City Stadium	5,000
Al-Sulaibikhat	Sulaibikhat	Al Salibikhaet Stadium	7,000
Al-Shabab	Al Ahmadi	Al-Ahmadi Stadium	18,000

== League table ==
The league table, consisting of 5 teams in which the top 2 clubs get promoted to the Kuwaiti Premier League.

Pos	Team	Pld	W	D	L	GF	GA	GD	Pts	Promotion
1	Al-Jahra (C)	16	7	5	4	22	20	+2	26	Promotion to Kuwaiti Premier League
2	Al-Shabab (P)	16	5	7	4	22	19	+3	22	Promotion to Kuwaiti Premier League
3	Al-Sulaibikhat	16	4	9	3	25	22	+3	21	
4	Burgan	16	4	7	5	17	19	−2	19	
5	Al-Sahel	16	3	6	7	14	20	−6	15	

Updated to match(es) played on 28 February 2025. Source:
(C) Champions; (P) Promoted

=== Results ===
Home \ Away	Burgan	Al-Shabab	Al-Sahel	Al-Sulaibikhat	Al-Jahra
Burgan		0–2	0–0	1–0	1–1
Al-Shabab	0–0		1–1	2–2	2–0
Al-Sahel	3–1	1–2		3–1	0–1
Al-Sulaibikhat	0–2	2–1	3–1		2–2
Al-Jahra	2–2	2–1	3–1	1–3	

Updated to match(es) played on February 27th. Source:
Legend: Blue = home team win; Yellow = draw; Red = away team win.

Home \ Away	Burgan	Al-Shabab	Al-Sahel	Al-Sulaibikhat	Al-Jahra
Burgan		2–3	2–0	1–1	0–3
Al-Shabab	1–1		0–0	0–3	1–2
Al-Sahel	1–0	1–1		1–1	0–1
Al-Sulaibikhat	2–2	2–2	1–1		1–1
Al-Jahra	0–2	0–3	2–0	1–1	

Updated to match(es) played on March 11th. Source:
Legend: Blue = home team win; Yellow = draw; Red = away team win.
