= 2011–12 Kuwait Emir Cup =

Tournament details
- Country: Kuwait

Final positions
- Champions: Al Qadsia
- Runners-up: Kazma

Tournament statistics
- Matches played: 25
- Goals scored: 59 (2.36 per match)

The Kuwait Emir Cup is the premier cup competition involving teams from the Kuwaiti Premier League and the Kuwaiti Division One league.

The 2012 edition is the 49th to be held and has been brought forward from its usual slot to be played over two calendar years.

Defending Emir Cup champions Kazma and defending Kuwaiti Premier League title holders Al Qadsia received byes to the Quarter-Final round.

The winners qualify for the 2013 AFC Cup.

== First round ==
22 November 2011 1st leg	Sulaibikhat	2 – 2	Al Naser	Kuwait City
				Stadium: Al Kuwait Sports Club Stadium

26 November 2011 2nd leg	Al Naser	0 – 2 (2 – 4 agg.)	Sulaibikhat	Kuwait City
				Stadium: Al Kuwait Sports Club Stadium

23 November 2011 1st leg	Al Fahaheel	0 – 2	Al Arabi

27 November 2011 2nd leg	Al Arabi	1 – 0 (3 – 0 agg.)	Al Fahaheel	Kuwait City
				Stadium: Mohammed Al-Hamad Stadium

22 November 2011 1st leg	Al Kuwait	1 – 0	Khaitan

26 November 2011 2nd leg	Khaitan	3 – 5 (3 – 6 agg.)	Al Kuwait

23 November 2011 1st leg	Al Salmiya	3 – 1	Sahel	Kuwait City
				Stadium: Sabah Al Salem Stadium

27 November 2011 2nd leg	Sahel	0 – 1 (1 – 4 agg.)	Al Salmiya	Kuwait City
				Stadium: Sabah Al Salem Stadium

22 November 2011 1st leg	Al Jahra	3 – 1	Tadamon	Al Farwaniyah
				Stadium: Ali Al-Salem Al-Sabah Stadium

26 November 2011 2nd leg	Tadamon	1 – 1 (2 – 4 agg.)	Al Jahra	Al Farwaniyah
				Stadium: Ali Al-Salem Al-Sabah Stadium

23 November 2011 1st leg	Al Yarmouk	0 – 0	Al Shabab	Kuwait City
				Stadium: Thamir Stadium

27 November 2011 2nd leg	Al Shabab	3 – 1 (3 – 1 agg.)	Al Yarmouk	Kuwait City
				Stadium: Mohammed Al-Hamad Stadium

== Quarter finals ==
3 January 2012 1st leg	Kazma	1 – 2	Al Arabi

10 January 2012 2nd leg	Al Arabi	0 – 2 (2 – 3 agg.)	Kazma

3 January 2012 1st leg	Al Qadsia	0 – 1	Al Kuwait

10 January 2012 2nd leg	Al Kuwait	0 – 4 (1 – 4 agg.)	Al Qadsia

3 January 2012 1st leg	Al Shabab	0 – 1	Al Jahra

10 January 2012 2nd leg	Al Jahra	0 – 1 (1–1 agg.) (4–3 p)	Al Shabab

3 January 2012 1st leg	Sulaibikhat	2 – 0	Al Salmiya

10 January 2012 2nd leg	Al Salmiya	2 – 1 (2 – 3 agg.)	Sulaibikhat

== Semi finals ==
24 January 2012 1st leg	Kazma	0 – 1	Al Jahra

31 January 2012 2nd leg	Al Jahra	0 – 1 (1–1 agg.) (5–6 p)	Kazma

24 January 2012 1st leg	Al Qadsia	1 – 0	Sulaibikhat

31 January 2012 2nd leg	Sulaibikhat	1 – 4 (1 – 5 agg.)	Al Qadsia

== Final ==
13 March 2012	Kazma	0–1	Qadsia	Kaifan
			Al Soma 45+3'	Stadium: Al Kuwait Sports Club Stadium
