= Yousef Nasser =

Kuwaiti footballer

Personal information
- Full name: Yousef Nasser Al-Sulaiman
- Date of birth: 9 October 1990 (age 36)
- Place of birth: Kuwait City, Kuwait
- Height: 1.87 m (6 ft 2 in)
- Position: Forward

Team information
- Current team: Kuwait SC
- Number: 20

Youth career
- 2005–2009: Kazma

Senior career*
Years	Team	Apps	(Gls)
2008–2017	Kazma		(43)
2013–2014	→ Ajman (loan)	16	(2)
2017–2018	Al-Nahda	9	(6)
2018–2019	Qadsia SC		(10)
2019–	Kuwait SC		(100)

International career^{‡}
2006	Kuwait U17	1	(2)
2009	Kuwait U20	7	(1)
2009–	Kuwait	133	(60)
- * Club domestic league appearances and goals as of 14 January 2025 ‡ National team caps and goals as of 29 September 2026

Yousef Nasser Al-Sulaiman (Arabic: يُوسُف نَاصِر السُّلَيْمَان, born 9 October 1990) is a Kuwaiti professional footballer who plays as a forward for Kuwaiti Premier League club Kuwait SC and the Kuwait national team.

== Career statistics ==
=== International ===
Scores and results list Kuwait's goal tally first.

List of international goals scored by Yousef Nasser
No.	Date	Venue	Opponent	Score	Result	Competition
1.	10 October 2009	Mokhtar El-Tetsh Stadium, Cairo, Egypt	Jordan	2–1	2–1	Friendly
2.	6 January 2010	Al Kuwait Sports Club Stadium, Kuwait City, Kuwait	Australia	2–2	2–2	2011 AFC Asian Cup qualification
3.	25 February 2010	Tahnoun bin Mohammed Stadium, Al Ain, United Arab Emirates	Bahrain	3–1	4–1	Friendly
4.	3 September 2010	Al-Sadaqua Walsalam Stadium, Kuwait City, Kuwait	Syria	3–0	3–0	Friendly
5.	28 September 2010	King Abdullah Stadium, Amman, Jordan	Jordan	1–2	2–2	2010 WAFF Championship
6.	3 October 2010	King Abdullah Stadium, Amman, Jordan	Iran	2–0	2–1	2010 WAFF Championship
7.	12 October 2010	Jaber Al-Ahmad International Stadium, Kuwait City, Kuwait	Vietnam	1–1	3–1	Friendly
8.	12 October 2010	Jaber Al-Ahmad International Stadium, Kuwait City, Kuwait	Vietnam	2–1	3–1	Friendly
9.	14 November 2010	Al Nahyan Stadium, Abu Dhabi, United Arab Emirates	India	1–0	9–1	Friendly
10.	22 November 2010	22 May Stadium, Aden, Yemen	Qatar	1–0	1–0	20th Arabian Gulf Cup
11.	31 December 2010	Suez Stadium, Suez, Egypt	Zambia	1–0	4–0	Friendly
12.	2 July 2011	Camille Chamoun Sports City Stadium, Beirut, Lebanon	Lebanon	3–0	6–0	Friendly
13.	2 July 2011	Camille Chamoun Sports City Stadium, Beirut, Lebanon	Lebanon	5–0	6–0	Friendly
14.	6 July 2011	Camille Chamoun Sports City Stadium, Beirut, Lebanon	Oman	1–1	1–1	Friendly
15.	23 July 2011	Mohammed Al-Hamad Stadium, Hawally, Kuwait	Philippines	1–0	3–0	2014 FIFA World Cup qualification
16.	28 July 2011	Rizal Memorial Stadium, Manila, Philippines	Philippines	1–1	2–1	2014 FIFA World Cup qualification
17.	2 September 2011	Tahnoun bin Mohammed Stadium, Al Ain, United Arab Emirates	United Arab Emirates	1–0	3–2	2014 FIFA World Cup qualification
18.	2 September 2011	Tahnoun bin Mohammed Stadium, Al Ain, United Arab Emirates	United Arab Emirates	3–0	3–2	2014 FIFA World Cup qualification
19.	14 December 2011	Ahmed bin Ali Stadium, Al-Rayyan, Qatar	Oman	1–0	2–0	2011 Pan Arab Games
20.	14 December 2011	Ahmed bin Ali Stadium, Al-Rayyan, Qatar	Oman	2–0	2–0	2011 Pan Arab Games
21.	8 December 2012	Al-Sadaqua Walsalam Stadium, Kuwait City, Kuwait	Palestine	1–0	2–1	2012 WAFF Championship
22.	14 December 2012	Al-Sadaqua Walsalam Stadium, Kuwait City, Kuwait	Lebanon	1–0	2–1	2012 WAFF Championship
23.	6 January 2013	Khalifa Sports City Stadium, Isa Town, Bahrain	Yemen	1–0	2–0	21st Arabian Gulf Cup
24.	12 January 2013	Bahrain National Stadium, Riffa, Bahrain	Saudi Arabia	1–0	1–0	21st Arabian Gulf Cup
25.	9 October 2013	King Abdullah Stadium, Amman, Jordan	Jordan	1–1	1–1	Friendly
26.	15 October 2013	Camille Chamoun Sports City Stadium, Beirut, Lebanon	Lebanon	1–0	1–1	2015 AFC Asian Cup qualification
27.	19 November 2013	Al Kuwait Sports Club Stadium, Kuwait City, Kuwait	Thailand	1–0	3–1	2015 AFC Asian Cup qualification
28.	19 November 2013	Al Kuwait Sports Club Stadium, Kuwait City, Kuwait	Thailand	3–1	3–1	2015 AFC Asian Cup qualification
29.	11 October 2014	King Abdullah Stadium, Amman, Jordan	Jordan	1–0	1–0	Friendly
30.	17 November 2014	Prince Faisal bin Fahd Stadium, Riyadh, Saudi Arabia	United Arab Emirates	1–2	2–2	22nd Arabian Gulf Cup
31.	11 June 2015	Saida Municipal Stadium, Sidon, Lebanon	Lebanon	1–0	1–0	2018 FIFA World Cup qualification
32.	3 September 2015	Abdullah bin Khalifa Stadium, Doha, Qatar	Myanmar	1–0	9–0	2018 FIFA World Cup qualification
33.	3 September 2015	Abdullah bin Khalifa Stadium, Doha, Qatar	Myanmar	3–0	9–0	2018 FIFA World Cup qualification
34.	8 September 2015	New Laos National Stadium, Vientiane, Laos	Laos	1–0	2–0	2018 FIFA World Cup qualification
35.	11 May 2018	Al Kuwait Sports Club Stadium, Kuwait City, Kuwait	Palestine	2–0	2–0	Friendly
36.	20 November 2018	Ali Sabah Al-Salem Stadium, Al Farwaniyah, Kuwait	Syria	1–2	1–2	Friendly
37.	25 March 2019	Al-Ahmadi Stadium, Al-Ahmadi, Kuwait	Nepal	1–0	1–0	Friendly
38.	5 September 2019	Al Kuwait Sports Club Stadium, Kuwait City, Kuwait	Nepal	1–0	7–0	2022 FIFA World Cup qualification
39.	5 September 2019	Al Kuwait Sports Club Stadium, Kuwait City, Kuwait	Nepal	3–0	7–0	2022 FIFA World Cup qualification
40.	14 November 2019	Jaber Al-Ahmad International Stadium, Kuwait City, Kuwait	Chinese Taipei	1–0	9–0	2022 FIFA World Cup qualification
41.	14 November 2019	Jaber Al-Ahmad International Stadium, Kuwait City, Kuwait	Chinese Taipei	5–0	9–0	2022 FIFA World Cup qualification
42.	30 November 2019	Abdullah bin Khalifa Stadium, Doha, Qatar	Oman	1–2	1–2	24th Arabian Gulf Cup
43.	2 December 2019	Khalifa International Stadium, Doha, Qatar	Bahrain	1–1	2–4	24th Arabian Gulf Cup
44.	15 June 2021	Jaber Al-Ahmad International Stadium, Kuwait City, Kuwait	Chinese Taipei	1–0	2–1	2022 FIFA World Cup qualification
45.	15 June 2021	Jaber Al-Ahmad International Stadium, Kuwait City, Kuwait	Chinese Taipei	2–1	2–1	2022 FIFA World Cup qualification
46.	1 June 2022	Al Nahyan Stadium, Abu Dhabi, United Arab Emirates	Singapore	2–0	2–0	Friendly
47.	8 June 2022	Jaber Al-Ahmad International Stadium, Kuwait City, Kuwait	Indonesia	1–0	1–2	2023 AFC Asian Cup qualification
48.	11 June 2022	Jaber Al-Ahmad International Stadium, Kuwait City, Kuwait	Nepal	2–0	4–1	2023 AFC Asian Cup qualification
49.	11 June 2022	Jaber Al-Ahmad International Stadium, Kuwait City, Kuwait	Nepal	3–0	4–1	2023 AFC Asian Cup qualification
50.	5 September 2024	Amman International Stadium, Amman, Jordan	Jordan	1–1	1–1	2026 FIFA World Cup qualification
51.	15 October 2024	Jassim bin Hamad Stadium, Al-Rayyan, Qatar	Palestine	1–0	2–2	2026 FIFA World Cup qualification
52.	15 October 2024	Jassim bin Hamad Stadium, Al-Rayyan, Qatar	Palestine	2–1	2–2	2026 FIFA World Cup qualification
53.	21 December 2024	Jaber Al-Ahmad International Stadium, Kuwait City, Kuwait	Oman	1–0	1–1	26th Arabian Gulf Cup
54.	20 March 2025	Basra International Stadium, Basra, Iraq	Iraq	1–0	2–2	2026 FIFA World Cup qualification
55.	20 March 2025	Basra International Stadium, Basra, Iraq	Iraq	2–0	2–2	2026 FIFA World Cup qualification
56.	15 November 2025	Al Salam Stadium, Cairo, Egypt	Tanzania	3–2	4–2	Friendly
57.	18 November 2025	Cairo International Stadium, Cairo, Egypt	Gambia	1–2	2–2	Friendly
58.	6 December 2025	Ahmad bin Ali Stadium, Al-Rayyan, Qatar	Jordan	1–2	1–3	2025 FIFA Arab Cup
59.	26 September 2026	Prince Abdullah Al-Faisal Sports City Stadium, Jeddah, Saudi Arabia	Iraq	1–1	2–3	27th Arabian Gulf Cup
60.	26 September 2026	Prince Abdullah Al-Faisal Sports City Stadium, Jeddah, Saudi Arabia	Iraq	2–2	2–3	27th Arabian Gulf Cup

== Honours ==
Kazma SC

- Kuwait Emir Cup: 2011
- Kuwait Federation Cup: 2015–16

Kuwait SC

- Kuwait Premier League: 2019–20, 2021–22, 2022–23, 2023–24, 2024–25
- Kuwait Emir Cup: 2020–21, 2022–23
- Kuwait Crown Prince Cup: 2020–21
- Kuwait Super Cup: 2020, 2022, 2023–24
- AFC Challenge League: 2025–26

Kuwait

- WAFF Championship: 2010
- Arabian Gulf Cup: 2010

Individual

- Kuwait Premier League Golden boot: 2024–25

== See also ==
- List of men's footballers with 50 or more international goals
