= List of football stadiums in Kuwait =

The following is a list of football stadiums in Kuwait, ordered by capacity.

== Current stadiums ==
#	Image	Stadium	Capacity	City	Home team
1		Jaber Al-Ahmad International Stadium	60,000	Ardhiya, Farwaniya Governorate	Kuwait national football team
2		Mohammed Al-Hamad Stadium	23,000	Hawalli, Hawalli Governorate	Qadsia SC
3		Al-Sadaqua Walsalam Stadium	21,500	Adiliya, Hawalli Governorate	Kazma SC
4		Al Kuwait Sports Club Stadium	19,000	Keifan, Capital	Kuwait SC
5		Al-Ahmadi Stadium	18,000	Ahmadi, Ahmadi Governorate	Al-Shabab SC
6		Mubarak Al-Aiar Stadium	17,000	Jahra, Al Jahra Governorate	Jahra SC
7		Sabah Al Salem Stadium	26,000	Mansuriya, Capital	Al-Arabi SC
8		Thamir Stadium	14,000	Salmiya, Hawalli Governorate	Al-Salmiya SC
9		Farwaniya Stadium	14,000	Farwaniya, Farwaniya Governorate	Tadamon SC
10		Ali Al-Salem Al-Sabah Stadium	14,000	Ardhiya, Farwaniya Governorate	Al-Nasr SC
11		Khaitan Stadium	11,000	Ardhiya, Farwaniya Governorate	Khaitan SC
12		PAAET Stadium	9,000	Shuwaikh, Capital	Kuwait national under-23
13		Al Salibikhaet Stadium	15,000	Sulaibikhat, Capital	Sulaibikhat SC
14		Abu Halifa City Stadium	2,000	Abu Hulayfah, Ahmadi Governorate	Sahel SC
15		Fahaheel Stadium	2,000	Fahaheel, Ahmadi Governorate	Al-Fahaheel FC

== See also ==
- Football in Kuwait
- List of Asian stadiums by capacity
- List of association football stadiums by capacity
- Lists of stadiums
