= Nabil Maâloul =

Tunisian football manager (born 1962)

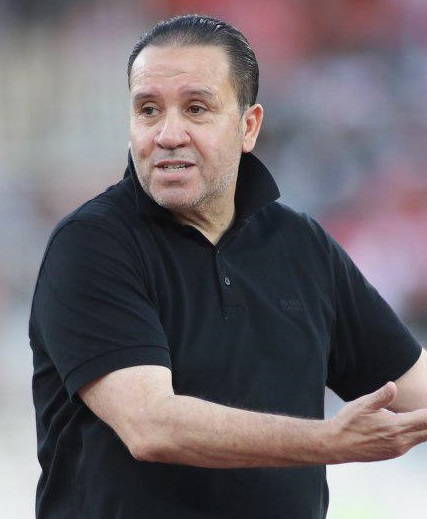
- Maâloul in 2018

Personal information
- Full name: Nabil Maâloul
- Date of birth: 25 December 1962 (age 63)
- Place of birth: Tunis, Tunisia
- Position: Midfielder

Team information
- Current team: CR Belouizdad (head coach)

Senior career*
Years	Team	Apps	(Gls)
1981–1989	Espérance de Tunis		
1989–1991	Hannover 96	28	(2)
1991–1994	Espérance de Tunis		
1994	Al-Ahli Club		
1994–1995	Club Bizertin		
1995–1996	Club Africain		

International career
1982–1994	Tunisia	74	(11)

Managerial career
- 1997–1998: Olympique du Kef
- 2002–2004: Tunisia (assistant)
- 2003–2004: Tunisia U23
- 2004–2005: Club Africain
- 2005–2006: Club Bizertin
- 2006–2008: Tunisia (assistant)
- 2010–2012: Espérance de Tunis
- 2012–2013: Espérance de Tunis
- 2013: Tunisia
- 2014: El Jaish
- 2014–2015: Kuwait
- 2017–2018: Tunisia
- 2018–2019: Al-Duhail
- 2020–2021: Syria
- 2021–2022: Kuwait SC
- 2022–2023: Espérance de Tunis
- 2023–2024: Kuwait SC
- 2024–2025: USM Alger
- 2025–2026: Qadsia
- 2026–: CR Belouizdad
- * Club domestic league appearances and goals

Nabil Maâloul (Arabic: نَبِيْل مَعْلُول; born 25 December 1962) is a Tunisian professional former footballer who played as a midfielder for the Tunisia national team and the currend head coach of CR Belouizdad.

Maâloul was capped 74 times for his country, and participated in 1988 Summer Olympics in Seoul. He spent most of his playing career with his home club, Espérance de Tunis and won it a historic treble as a coach in 2011 (league, cup and CAF Champions League).

During his managerial career, he was in charge of three national teams: Tunisia, Kuwait, and Syria, but he also managed clubs in Tunisia and Qatar.

== Club career ==
Maâloul began playing football at the age of 6 or 7, following the example of his father. He began his professional career at the Espérance de Tunis at the age of 18 and then dropped his studies.

He then wore the colors of Club Bizertin during the return phase of the 1994–1995 season and then of Club Africain between 1995 and 1996, marking the end of his career, due to a disagreement with the president of the club Slim Chiboub, who does not want to sign a contract with him again after a short period in Saudi Arabia.

== International career ==
With the National team he started in 1985, collecting 74 appearances in 10 years and scored 11 goals. He participated in the 1988 Summer Olympics in Seoul. He was one of the youngest captains in the national team's history at 23 years old.

== Managerial career ==
He finished his playing career and became coach of Olympique du Kef in 1997. In 2002, he became assistant coach of Roger Lemerre when Tunisia won 2004 African Cup of Nations. He decided to leave his post as assistant for coaching Club Africain and in September 2006 he returned to the staff of the team. Meanwhile, he made a brief pass as coach of Club Bizertin at the start of the 2005–2006 season with unconvincing results.

The real start was in December 2010, he took command of Espérance de Tunis, following the dismissal of Maher Kanzari, and won with it a historic treble in 2011 (League, Cup and CAF Champions League) before being replaced by Michel Decastel in January 2012; He replaced it a few months later. On 14 February 2013, he officially became the coach of the Tunisia. On 23 March, he coached his first match with Sierra Leone and Tunisia wins by the score of (2–1). On 7 September, after a home defeat (0–2) with Cape Verde that eliminates Tunisia from qualifying for the 2014 World Cup, Maâloul announces his resignation. Cape Verde was later expunged from the qualification after the players' eligibility controversies.

On 29 November 2013, he agreed with Raja CA to become coach of the team in 2013 FIFA Club World Cup, replacing Mohamed Fakhir, before refusing.

On 20 January 2014, he became the coach of the Qatari team El Jaish SC, and won 2014 Qatar Crown Prince Cup on 26 April 2014. He also took the team from 5th to 2nd place in half a season therefore qualifying for the AFC Champions League.

On 20 December 2014, he became the coach of Kuwait, and coached them in 2015 AFC Asian Cup and the second round of 2018 FIFA World Cup qualification before that FIFA suspend Kuwait Football Association on 16 October 2015.

On 27 April 2017, Maâloul became the coach of Tunisia again and succeeded in bringing his team back to the 2018 FIFA World Cup for the first time since 2006 and becoming the second Tunisian coach to qualify for the World Cup after Abdelmajid Chetali in 1978. After the team's elimination from the group stage, he resigned to coach Al-Duhail SC. He parted ways after six months of coaching due to multiple disagreements with the club.

On 11 March 2020, Maâloul was officially appointed as the new head coach of Syria on a one-year contract, to become the first Tunisian to coach Syria. Despite reaching the third round of the World Cup qualification, Maâloul resigned on 16 June 2021 due to unpaid salaries, after losing 3–1 to China.

On 27 October 2021, Maâloul became the coach of Kuwait SC. He has won the Emir Cup on 21 December 2021 and the Kuwait Premier League in April 2022.

On 9 June 2022, Maaloul returned to Espérance de Tunis nearly 10 years after his departure. He left the club on 13 May 2023.

On 7 December 2023 he returned to Kuwait SC as headcoach. In his second term he won the supercup and became league champions once again. The club terminated his contract on 9 July 2024.

On 14 July 2024, he was appointed manager of Algerian club USM Alger.

On 2 July 2026, he was appointed manager of Algerian club CR Belouizdad.

== Career statistics ==
=== Managerial ===
As of 10 February 2026

Team	From	To	Record					
Team	From	To	G	W	D	L	Win %	Ref
(Tunisia) Club Bizertin	1 July 2005	25 September 2005	8	0	5	3	0.00	
(Tunisia) Espérance de Tunis	27 December 2010	31 December 2011	35	22	8	5	62.86	
(Tunisia) Espérance de Tunis	1 June 2012	26 January 2013	27	19	3	5	70.37	
Tunisia	14 February 2013	8 September 2013	7	2	3	2	28.57	
(Qatar) El Jaish	22 January 2014	7 December 2014	35	20	7	8	57.14	
Kuwait	20 December 2014	20 March 2017	11	3	2	6	27.27	
Tunisia	28 April 2017	12 July 2018	13	6	4	3	46.15	
Al-Duhail	13 July 2018	5 January 2019	22	14	6	2	63.64	
Syria	1 March 2020	16 June 2021	7	3	0	4	42.86	
Kuwait SC	4 November 2021	31 May 2022	30	18	9	3	60.00	
(Tunisia) Espérance de Tunis	9 June 2022	13 May 2023	38	22	9	7	57.89	
Kuwait SC	6 December 2023	8 July 2024	24	18	6	0	75.00	
(Algeria) USM Alger	14 July 2024	10 February 2025	25	13	9	3	52.00	
(Kuwait) Qadsia SC	11 June 2025	30 June 2026	22	10	6	6	45.45	
(Algeria) CR Belouizdad	2 July 2026	present	0	0	0	0	—	
Total			287	162	67	58	56.45	—

== Honours ==
=== Player ===
Espérance de Tunis

- Tunisian Ligue Professionnelle 1: 1982, 1985, 1988, 1989, 1993, 1994
- Tunisian Cup: 1986, 1989
- Tunisian Super Cup: 1993
- Arab Club Championship: 1993

Club Africain

- Tunisian Ligue Professionnelle 1: 1996
- Arab Cup Winners' Cup: 1995

=== Manager ===
Espérance de Tunis

- Tunisian Ligue Professionnelle 1: 2011, 2012
- Tunisian Cup: 2011
- CAF Champions League: 2011

El Jaish

- Qatar Cup: 2014

Kuwait SC

- Kuwait Premier League: 2022, 2024
- Kuwait Emir Cup: 2021
- Kuwait Super Cup: 2024

Qadsia SC

- Kuwait Super Cup: 2026
