= Faisal Zayid =

Kuwaiti professional footballer (born 1991)

Personal information
- Full name: Faisal Zayid Al-Harbi
- Date of birth: 9 October 1991 (age 35)
- Place of birth: Kuwait City, Kuwait
- Height: 1.78 m (5 ft 10 in)
- Position: Midfielder

Team information
- Current team: Al-Kuwait SC
- Number: 9

Youth career
- –2010: Al-Jahra

Senior career*
Years	Team	Apps	(Gls)
2010–2018	Al-Jahra	119	(37)
2015–2016	→ Najran SC (loan)	2	(1)
2018	Al-Nahda	0	(0)
2018–	Al-Kuwait SC	60	(39)

International career^{‡}
2013–	Kuwait	66	(7)
- * Club domestic league appearances and goals as of 13 September 2019 ‡ National team caps and goals as of 19 January 2024

Faisal Zayid Al-Harbi (Arabic: فَيْصَل زَايِد الْحَرْبِيّ; born 9 October 1991) is a Kuwaiti professional footballer who plays as a midfielder for Al-Kuwait SC.

== International career ==
=== International goals ===
Scores and results list Kuwait's goal tally first.

Goal	Date	Venue	Opponent	Score	Result	Competition
1.	29 December 2013	Jassim Bin Hamad Stadium, Doha, Qatar	Lebanon	2–0	2–0	2014 WAFF Championship
2.	3 September 2015	Abdullah bin Khalifa Stadium, Doha, Qatar	Myanmar	4–0	9–0	2018 FIFA World Cup qualification
3.	11 October 2018	Al Kuwait Sports Club Stadium, Kuwait City, Kuwait	Lebanon	1–0	1–0	Friendly
4.	7 August 2019	Franso Hariri Stadium, Erbil, Iraq	Jordan	1–0	1–1	2019 WAFF Championship
5.	14 November 2019	Al Kuwait Sports Club Stadium, Kuwait City, Kuwait	Chinese Taipei	6–0	9–0	2022 FIFA World Cup qualification
6.	19 November 2022	Police Officers' Club Stadium, Dubai, UAE	Lebanon	2–0	2–0	Friendly
7.	12 January 2024	Cairo International Stadium, Cairo, Egypt	Libya	1–2	1–3	Friendly

== Honours ==
Al-Kuwait

- AFC Challenge League: 2025-2026

Individual

- VIVA Premier League Player of the Month: October 2017
