= PAAET Stadium =

Sports venue in Kuwait

- Olympic Stadium
- Interactive map of PAAET Stadium
- Location: Shuwaikh, Capital
- Coordinates: 29.3328°N 47.9261°E
- Owner: Kuwait Football Association, Kuwait Olympic Committee
- Operator: Kuwait national under-23 football team
- Capacity: 9,000
- Surface: Grass

Construction
- Groundbreaking: 11 December 2014
- Built: 2014–2016 (2 years)
- Opened: 5 July 2016
- Cost: 25 million Kuwaiti dinar (US$82.5 million)

Tenant
- Kuwait national under-23 football team 2016-

One of the newest stadiums in Kuwait after the opening of the renovated Jaber Al-Ahmad International Stadium back on 18 December 2015. it mainly constructed for Olympic teams and University Teams across the country.

== History ==
It was Officially unveiled on July 5, 2016 at the opening and at the same time announced another project Sabah Al-Salem University Sports City. Along with the opening it said that matches will be played as soon as the ban from FIFA is removed.

== See also ==
- List of football stadiums in Kuwait
