= Igor Filipović =

Serbian footballer

Personal information
- Date of birth: 17 April 1992 (age 34)
- Place of birth: Užice, SFR Yugoslavia
- Height: 1.91 m (6 ft 3 in)
- Position: Centre-back

Team information
- Current team: KSC Tesla 07

Senior career*
Years	Team	Apps	(Gls)
2011	Čukarički	11	(0)
2012–2013	Mladost Lučani	17	(1)
2013–2016	Sloga Požega		
2017–2018	Sileks	48	(1)
2018–2019	Metalac	10	(0)
2019	Al-Shabab	2	(0)
2019	Sloga Požega	0	(0)
2020	Aspropyrgos	8	(0)
2020–2022	Olympiacos Volos	42	(4)
2023-	KSC Tesla 07	39	(13)
- * Club domestic league appearances and goals as of 20 April 2022

Igor Filipović (Serbian Cyrillic: Игор Филиповић; born 17 April 1992) is a Serbian professional footballer who plays as a centre-back.
