= Medo Kamara =

Sierra Leonean footballer (born 1987)

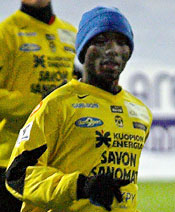
- Medo with KuPS in 2006

Personal information
- Date of birth: 16 November 1987 (age 38)
- Place of birth: Port Loko, Sierra Leone
- Height: 1.74 m (5 ft 9 in)
- Position: Defensive midfielder

Team information
- Current team: HJS
- Number: 6

Youth career
- 1999–2002: Sierra Rangers
- 2002–2003: Kallon

Senior career*
Years	Team	Apps	(Gls)
2006	KuPS	23	(0)
2007–2010	HJK	91	(13)
2010–2013	Partizan	52	(0)
2013–2016	Bolton Wanderers	52	(3)
2015	→ Maccabi Haifa (loan)	16	(1)
2016	HJK	21	(1)
2016–2018	Kuwait SC		
2019	Kazma		
2020	Haka	18	(1)
2022–2023	Gnistan	31	(1)
2024–	HJS	27	(2)

International career^{‡}
2003	Sierra Leone U17	3	(0)
2011–2021	Sierra Leone	33	(2)
- * Club domestic league appearances and goals as of 17 October 2024 ‡ National team caps and goals as of 30 September 2022

Mohamed Kamara (born 16 November 1987), widely known as Medo, is a Sierra Leonean professional footballer who plays as a defensive midfielder for Finnish club HJS.

== Early life ==
Kamara was born in Port Loko and raised in Bo, Sierra Leone. Both of his parents were said to have been killed during the civil war in Sierra Leone. However, this is a claim that has since been denied by Kamara himself.

== Club career ==
=== Early career ===
Kamara started playing football in his school at the age of seven. His older brother, Kemoh Kamara, was teaching in the school and also taught football. At the age of 12, Kamara joined his first club, Sierra Rangers. His football career took a great step forward after signing for top division club Kallon in 2002.

=== Career in Finland ===
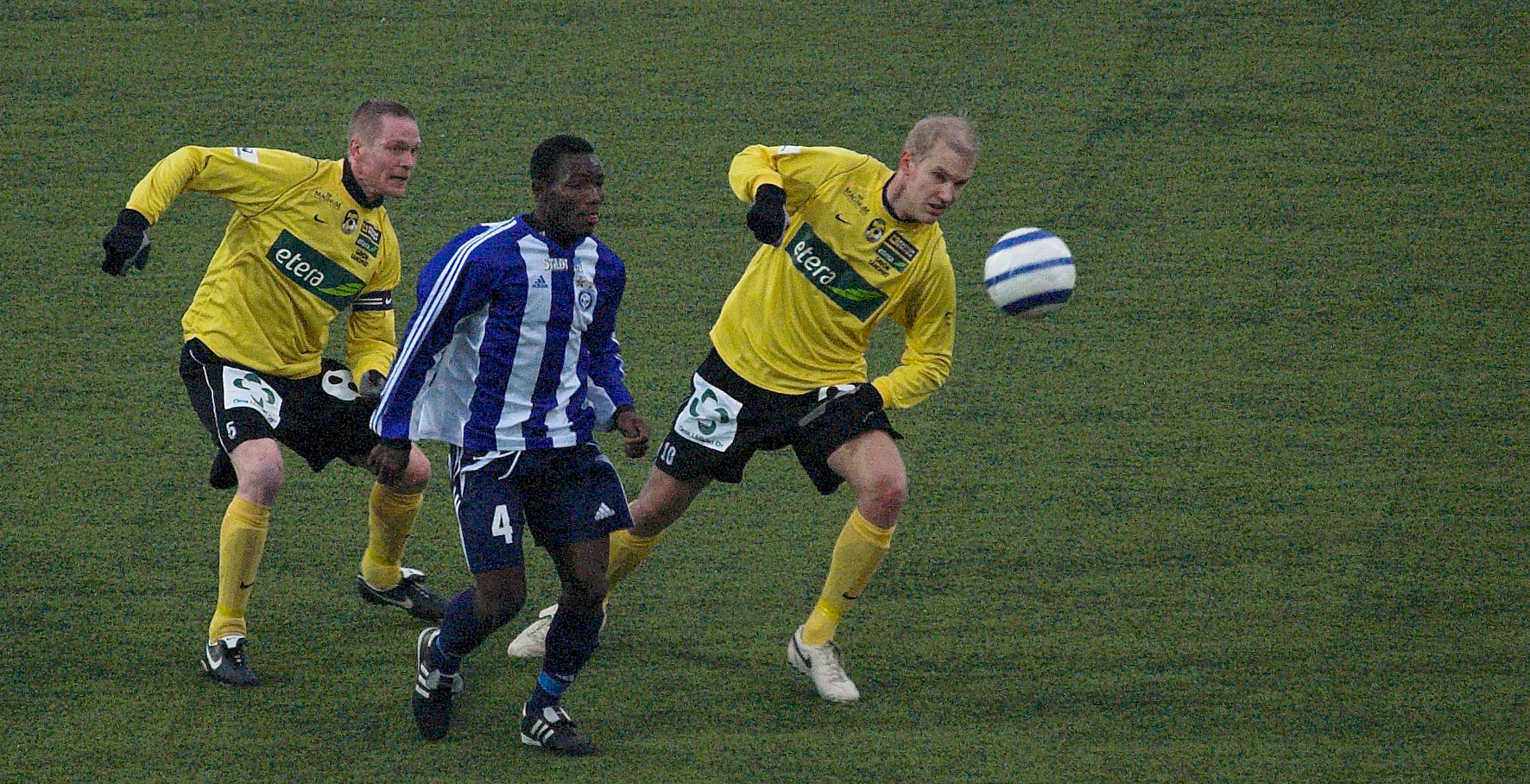
Kamara (wearing stripes) in action for HJK versus former club KuPS, 2008

After playing for the national youth selection at the 2003 FIFA U-17 World Championship held in Finland, Kamara escaped along with several teammates from their accommodation and applied for asylum. After he got asylum, Kamara was ineligible to play professional football until his 18th birthday. During the waiting period, he trained with LehPa-77 in Kontiolahti. Kamara signed his first contract with Veikkausliiga club KuPS before the 2006 season. After a season and relegation with the Kuopio-based club, he moved to HJK in the Finnish capital.

In his first year with HJK, Kamara played in every league match and was voted for the club MVP of the season. In March 2008, he signed a new three-year contract, which would keep him with HJK until the end of the 2010. In April 2010, Kamara signed a contract extension at HJK to stay with the Finnish champions until June 2011. On 30 August 2010, he played his farewell match for HJK, in a 3–1 victory against IFK Mariehamn.

Despite the fact that he left HJK before the end of the season, Kamara was awarded for the 2010 Veikkausliiga Player of the Year.

=== Partizan ===
On 31 August 2010, a day after his last match for HJK, Kamara signed a three-year contract with Serbian side Partizan. He was presented with together with Pierre Boya. Kamara made his debut for the club on 4 September 2010 in a home fixture against Hajduk Kula. He played for the full duration of the match as Hajduk were beaten 2–0. Kamara also made five appearances in the 2010–11 UEFA Champions League group stage.

=== Bolton Wanderers ===
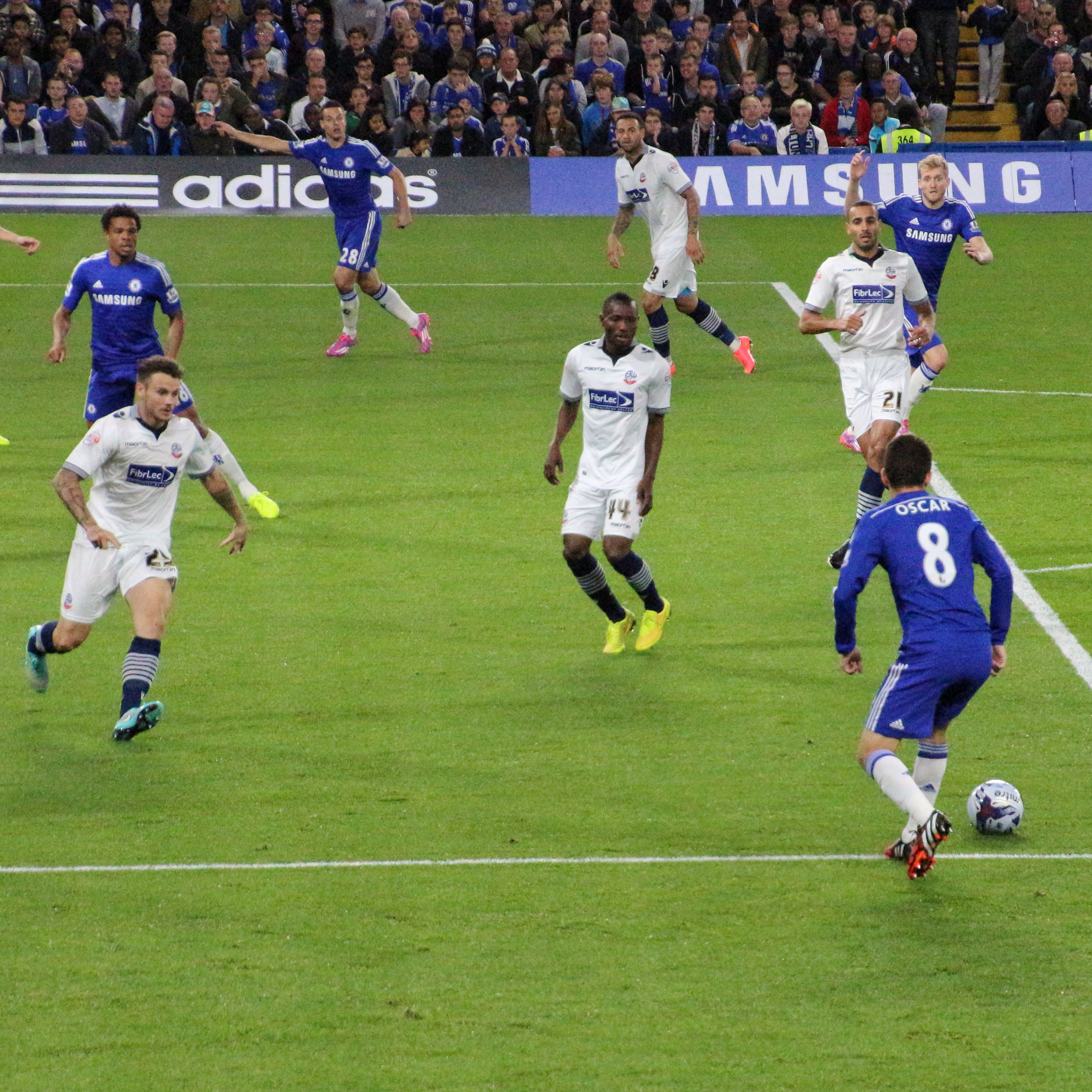
Kamara (centre) playing for Bolton Wanderers against Chelsea in the League Cup in 2014

On 31 January 2013, Kamara signed for English Championship club Bolton Wanderers on a three-and-a-half-year contract for an undisclosed fee, subject to international clearance. His debut came on 23 February as he came on as a substitute in Bolton's 4–1 win versus Hull City. His first goal for the club came on 30 March against Charlton Athletic as he scored Bolton's second in a 2–3 defeat.

On 19 January 2015, Kamara was officially loaned to Maccabi Haifa for the remainder of the 2014–15 season.

After returning from loan to Bolton, Kamara failed to make any competitive appearance for the club, before being released by mutual agreement in January 2016.

=== Return to HJK ===
In March 2016, Kamara returned to his former club HJK.

=== Kazma ===
On 31 January 2019, it was confirmed that Kamara had signed for another Kuwaiti side, Kazma SC in the Kuwait Premier League. Kamara had been without club for six months since his departure from Kuwait SC.

In 2022 Medo signed contract with Finnish second division club Gnistan. In 2024 he joined Finnish club HJS, which plays third tier football in Finland.

== International career ==
Internationally, Kamara played for the Sierra Leonean under-17 team that finished runner-up of the 2003 African U-17 Championship in Swaziland. He was also a member of the same team at the 2003 FIFA U-17 World Championship in Finland.

By 2010, he had received Finnish citizenship. After spending seven years in Finland, Kamara has expressed his wish to play for the Finnish national team, but FIFA ruled this out as they rejected his application to play for Finland in December 2010. After FIFA's decision, Kamara announced his availability for the Sierra Leonean national team and was subsequently called up to face Niger on 27 March 2011. Finally, Kamara debuted for his homeland in that match playing the full 90 minutes.

== Career statistics ==
=== Club ===
As of 20 March 2025

Appearances and goals by club, season and competition
Club	Season	League			National cup		League cup		Continental		Other		Total	
Club	Season	Division	Apps	Goals	Apps	Goals	Apps	Goals	Apps	Goals	Apps	Goals	Apps	Goals
KuPS	2006	Veikkausliiga	23	0	4	2	9	1	0	0	—		36	3
HJK	2007	Veikkausliiga	26	2	4	0	7	1	4 (Note: Appearances in UEFA Cup)	0	—		41	3
HJK	2008	Veikkausliiga	26	4	5	0	7	0	0	0	—		38	4
HJK	2009	Veikkausliiga	23	3	1	0	8	2	2 (Note: Appearances in UEFA Europa League)	1	—		34	6
HJK	2010	Veikkausliiga	16	4	3	1	6	1	4 (Note: Appearances in UEFA Champions League)	1	—		29	7
HJK	Total		91	13	13	1	28	4	10	2	—		142	20
Partizan	2010–11	Serbian SuperLiga	18	0	6	0	–		5	0	—		29	0
Partizan	2011–12	Serbian SuperLiga	26	0	4	0	–		6 (Note: Four appearances in UEFA Champions League, two appearances in UEFA Europa League)	0	—		36	0
Partizan	2012–13	Serbian SuperLiga	8	0	0	0	–		6	0	—		14	0
Partizan	Total		52	0	10	0	–		17	0	—		79	0
Bolton Wanderers	2012–13	Championship	12	1	0	0	0	0	0	0	—		12	1
Bolton Wanderers	2013–14	Championship	35	2	2	0	2	0	0	0	—		39	2
Bolton Wanderers	2014–15	Championship	5	0	0	0	1	0	0	0	—		6	0
Bolton Wanderers	Total		52	3	2	0	3	0	0	0	—		57	3
Maccabi Haifa (loan)	2014–15	Israeli Premier League	16	1	1	0	0	0	0	0	—		17	1
HJK	2016	Veikkausliiga	21	1	3	0	0	0	6	0	—		30	1
Kuwait SC	2016–17	Kuwait Premier League	?	2	?	?	–		?	?	—		?	2
Kuwait SC	2017–18	Kuwait Premier League	?	1	?	?	–		?	?	—		?	1
Kuwait SC	Total		?	3	?	?	–		?	?	–		?	3
FC Haka	2020	Veikkausliiga	18	1	3	0	–		0	0	—		21	1
IF Gnistan	2022	Ykkönen	8	0	0	0	–		0	0	—		8	0
IF Gnistan	2023	Ykkönen	23	1	7	0	–		—		2 (Note: Appearances in Relegation playoffs)	0	32	1
IF Gnistan	Total		31	1	7	0	–		—		2	0	40	1
HJS	2024	Kakkonen	27	2	0	0	—		—		—		27	2
Career total			331	25	43	3	40	5	33	2	2	0	449	34

=== International ===
Appearances and goals by national team and year
National team	Year	Apps	Goals
Sierra Leone	2011	4	0
Sierra Leone	2012	5	1
Sierra Leone	2013	4	0
Sierra Leone	2014	6	1
Sierra Leone	2015	4	0
Sierra Leone	2016	5	0
Sierra Leone	2017	1	0
Sierra Leone	2018	1	0
Sierra Leone	2020	2	0
Sierra Leone	2021	1	0
Total		33	2

Scores and results list Sierra Leone's goal tally first.

#	Date	Venue	Opponent	Score	Result	Competition
1	2 June 2012	National Stadium, Freetown	Cape Verde	1–0	2–1	2014 FIFA World Cup qualification
2	19 November 2014	Stade Tata Raphaël, Kinshasa	DR Congo	1–0	1–3	2015 Africa Cup of Nations qualification

== Honours ==
KuPS

- Finnish League Cup: 2006

HJK

- Veikkausliiga: 2009
- Finnish Cup: 2008

Partizan

- Serbian SuperLiga: 2010–11, 2011–12
- Serbian Cup: 2010–11

Individual

- Veikkausliiga Player of the Year: 2010
- Serbian SuperLiga Team of the Season: 2011–12
