= Yaqoub Al-Tararwa =

Kuwaiti footballer (born 1994)

Personal information
- Full name: Yaqoub Husain Al-Tararwa
- Date of birth: March 7, 1994 (age 32)
- Place of birth: Kuwait City, Kuwait
- Height: 1.76 m (5 ft 9 1/2 in)
- Positions: Winger; central attacking midfielder

Team information
- Current team: Khaitan
- Number: 20

Youth career
- 2010–2013: Kuwait SC

Senior career*
Years	Team	Apps	(Gls)
2013–2023	Kuwait SC	42	(19)
2016–2017	→ Al Tadhmon SC (loan)	28	(4)
2020–2021	→ Kazma (loan)	12	(3)
2021–2022	→ Al-Nasr (loan)	4	(1)
2022–2023	→ Al-Fahaheel (loan)	1	(0)
2023–2024	Khaitan		
2024	Al-Arabi	6	(0)

International career^{‡}
2014–2015	Kuwait U-21	4	(1)
2013–2015	Kuwait U23	2	(0)
2018–	Kuwait	4	(2)
- * Club domestic league appearances and goals as of 8:51, 10 May 2018 (UTC) ‡ National team caps and goals as of 11 May 2018

Yaqoub Husain Al-Tararwa (born 7 March 1994) is a Kuwaiti professional footballer who plays for Khaitan SC in the VIVA Premier League and the Kuwait national team mainly as a winger and central attacking midfielder.

== International career ==
=== International goals ===
Scores and results list Kuwait's goal tally first.

No	Date	Venue	Opponent	Score	Result	Competition
1.	25 March 2018	Jaber Al-Ahmad International Stadium, Kuwait City, Kuwait	Cameroon	1–3	1–3	Friendly
2.	11 May 2018	Al Kuwait Sports Club Stadium, Kuwait City, Kuwait	Palestine	1–0	2–0	Friendly
