= Abu Halifa City Stadium =

29.12203263909444°N 48.11828490306002°E Abu Halifa City Stadium is a multi-use stadium in Abu Halifa, Kuwait. It is currently used mostly for football matches and is the home stadium of Al-Sahel SC. The stadium holds 2,000 people.

== See also ==
- List of football stadiums in Kuwait
