= Birahim Gaye =

Senegalese footballer

Personal information
- Full name: Birahim Gaye
- Date of birth: 27 February 1994 (age 32)
- Place of birth: Senegal
- Height: 1.73 m (5 ft 8 in)
- Position: Forward

Team information
- Current team: Al-Shabab

Senior career*
Years	Team	Apps	(Gls)
2013–2020	Diambars		
2019–2020	→ Al-Shabab (loan)	13	(10)
2020–2021	Al Shahaniya	21	(17)
2021–2022	Hassania Agadir	15	(1)
2022–2023	Al Shahaniya	14	(8)
2023–	Al-Shabab		(8)

International career^{‡}
2019–	Senegal	1	(0)
- * Club domestic league appearances and goals ‡ National team caps and goals as of 22:05, 23 May 2024 (UTC)

Birahim Gaye (born 27 February 1994), is a Senegalese footballer who plays as a forward.

== Career statistics ==
As of 7 May 2023

Club	Division	Season	League		National Cup		Second Division Cup		Total	
Club	Division	Season	Apps	Goals	Apps	Goals	Apps	Goals	Apps	Goals
Al Shahaniya	Qatari Second Division	2020–21	21	17	1	2	0	0	22	19
Al Shahaniya	Qatari Second Division	2022–23	14	8	3	1	8	8	24	17
Al Shahaniya	Total		35	25	4	3	8	8	47	36
