= Jumaa Saeed =

Ivorian footballer (born 1992)

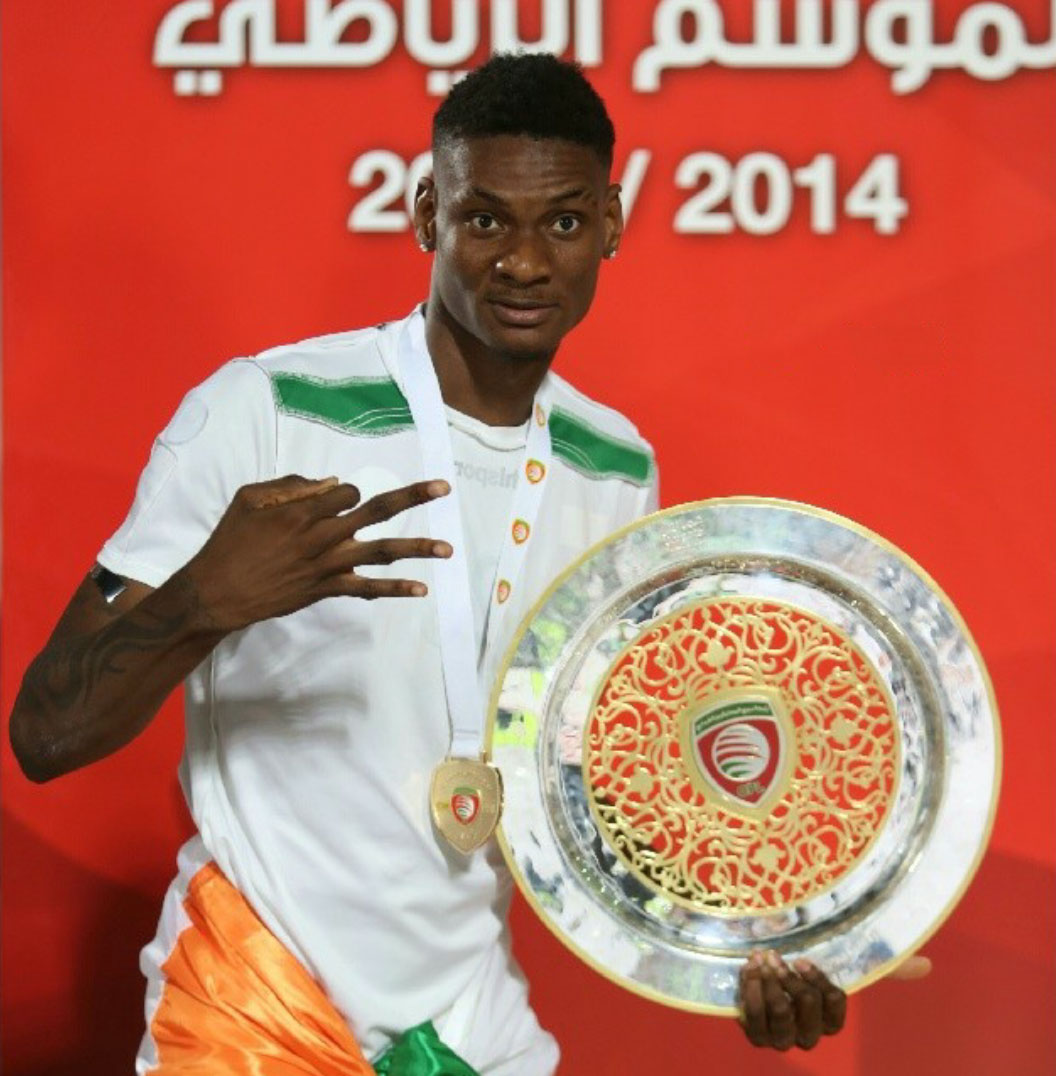
- Jumaa with Al-Nahda in 2014

Personal information
- Full name: Jumaa Saeed
- Date of birth: 13 September 1992 (age 34)
- Place of birth: Abidjan, Ivory Coast
- Height: 1.92 m (6 ft 3 1/2 in)
- Position: Forward

Team information
- Current team: Al-Jahra
- Number: 45

Senior career*
Years	Team	Apps	(Gls)
2009–2010	Esperance de Tunis		
2010–2015	Al-Ain		(2)
2012–2014	→ Al-Nahda (loan)		(25)
2014–2016	Al-Salmiyah		(23)
2016–2021	Kuwait SC		(40)
2021–2023	Al-Salmiyah		
2023–2024	Najran		
2024	Kuwait SC		
2024	Al-Nahda		
2024–	Al-Jahra		

International career
2020–	Ivory Coast	2	(0)
- * Club domestic league appearances and goals

Jumaa Saeed (born 13 September 1992) is an Ivorian professional footballer who plays as a forward for Al-Jahra. On 16 September 2023, Saeed joined Najran.
