= Fahaheel =

Fahaheel الفحيحيل
- Area
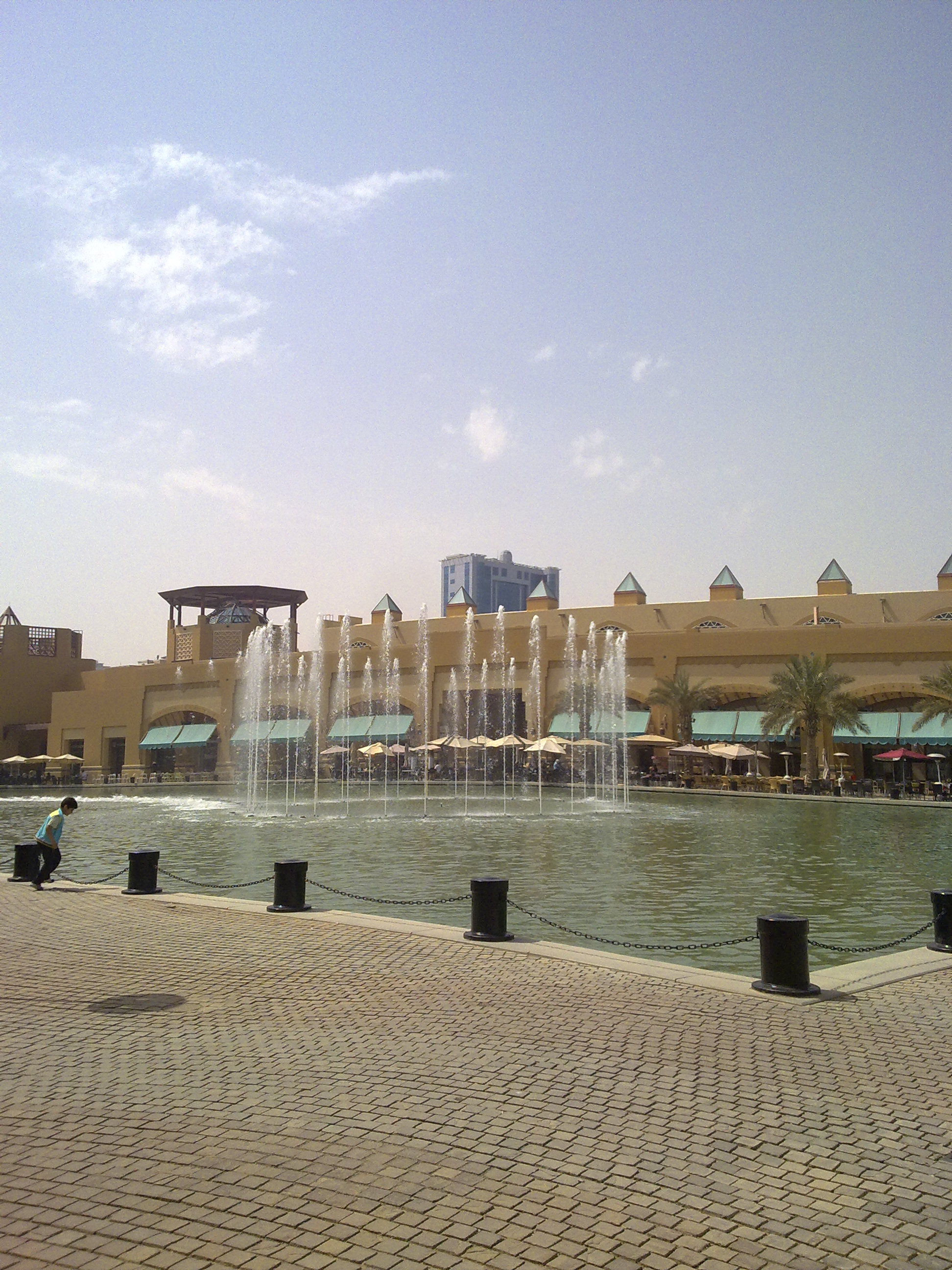
- Al-Kout Mall in Fahaheel

- Location within Kuwait Location within Persian Gulf Location within Asia
- Coordinates: 29°05′00″N 48°07′36″E

Fahaheel (Gulf Arabic: الفحيحيل, romanized: li-Fḥēḥīl) is an area in Kuwait, located in the Ahmadi Governorate in the country's south. Located on the coast of the Persian Gulf, it lies east of the Ahmadi area. The Fahaheel Fish Market, a major fish market in Kuwait, is located on the seashore of Fahaheel. It is a traditional style fresh fish market and is directly supplied by fishermen on the wharf, carrying buckets of fish directly from their boats. The shrimp season starts in September and ends in early February. Fahaheel is home to the Al Kout Mall and several other traditional and modern shops.

== Etymology ==
The area is named after a diminutive form for the word for masculine palm tree in Arabic, فحيحيل from فحل.
