= Alexandre Hans =

Brazilian footballer (born 1994)

Personal information
- Date of birth: 18 June 1994 (age 32)
- Place of birth: Brazil
- Height: 1.94 m (6 ft 4 in)
- Position: Centre back

Team information
- Current team: Al Tadamon
- Number: 4

Senior career*
Years	Team	Apps	(Gls)
2015–2016	Inter de Lages	0	(0)
2016	Rio Branco	9	(0)
2016–2017	Pirin Blagoevgrad	6	(0)
2017	Aves	6	(0)
2017	→ Sporting da Covilhã (loan)	4	(0)
2018–2019	→ Mafra (loan)	3	(0)
2019–	→ Al Tadamon (loan)	2	(0)
- * Club domestic league appearances and goals as of 22 October 2019

Alexandre Hans (born 18 June 1994) is a Brazilian footballer who plays as a defender for Portuguese club Mafra on loan from Aves.

== Career ==
In July 2016, Hans signed a two-year contract with Bulgarian side Pirin Blagoevgrad. He managed to make only six appearances and his contract was terminated by mutual consent in May 2017.

In June 2017, Hans signed with Portuguese club Aves and was loaned to LigaPro side Sporting da Covilhã.
