= Nayef Al-Dabbous Stadium =

Football stadium in Fahaheel, Kuwait

Coordinates: 29°05′34″N 48°07′03″E

- Interactive map of Nayef Al-Dabbous Stadium
- Location: Fahaheel, Kuwait
- Operator: Fahaheel
- Capacity: 12,000
- Surface: Grass

Construction
- Opened: 1964
- Renovated: 16 December 2025

Tenants
- Fahaheel (1964–2021), (2025–present)

Nayif Al-Dabbous Stadium is an all seater football stadium in Fahaheel, Kuwait. It is the home stadium of Fahaheel. It was renovated and reopened with during the 2025-26 season. Following its renovation, the stadium’s stands were expanded into 12,000 seats from the previous 2,000. The stadium also became the second stadium in Kuwait without a running track. On 19 December 2025, Fahaheel played their first game on the stadium following the renovation against Tadamon. The match ended 1–0 for the hosts.

== See also ==
- List of football stadiums in Kuwait
