= Nino Santos =

Brazilian footballer

Personal information
- Full name: Alecsandro Aparecido dos Santos
- Date of birth: 27 September 1984 (age 42)
- Place of birth: Catanduva, Brazil
- Height: 1.86 m (6 ft 1 in)
- Position: Center back

Senior career*
Years	Team	Apps	(Gls)
2004–2007	Rio Preto	42	(4)
2007	Ulbra	12	(2)
2008	Catanduvense	16	(3)
2008–2009	Guaratinguetá	15	(1)
2009	Campinense	23	(2)
2010	Catanduvense	12	(3)
2010	Criciúma	15	(4)
2011	Grêmio Barueri	9	(2)
2011–2016	Al Jahra	169	(42)
2016	Al-Batin	0	(0)
2017–2018	Al-Arabi SC	0	(0)
2018	Clube Atlético Penapolense	0	(0)
- * Club domestic league appearances and goals as of 12 March 2011

Alecsandro Aparecido dos Santos (born 27 September 1984), or simply Nino Santos, is a Brazilian professional footballer, who plays as a defender.

Nino Santos began his career at the base of Rio Preto where he signed his first professional contract, working in two Championships Paulistas's Access Division and Cup Paulista. After this, he had a quick passage through Ulbra to reach the Catanduvense, time of his hometown, to compete in the Paulista Championship Series A2. After a major championship, becoming one of the leaders and pillars of the team that reached the final stage of the competition, now in the Championship of the First Division at Guaratinguetá team. After the competition, he returned to Catanduvense idol. Again in Catanduvense stood out and landed in Criciúma, team led by the young coach Argel Fucks, which achieved the desired access to the Serie B of the Brazilian Championship. In Grêmio Barueri came to compete in the Championship of the First Division, but good performances earned her proposal and on one of those landed in Al-Jahra, Kuwait team, where he remained for five seasons, reaching a staggering 169 games and 42 goals, becoming the team captain and star of his team. In Al-Jahra, even without title achievements were vice champions of the King's Cup, Nino became idol, but after five seasons was transferred to Al-Batin Saudi Arabia for the season 2016-2017, later moved back to Kuwait to Al-Arabi SC in January 2017.
