= Ali Maqseed =

Kuwaiti footballer (born 1986)

Personal information
- Full name: Ali Ahmed Maqseed (Arabic:علي أحمد مقصيد)
- Date of birth: December 11, 1986 (age 39)
- Place of birth: Kuwait City, Kuwait
- Height: 1.65 m (5 ft 5 in)
- Positions: Left back; midfielder; winger

Youth career
- 1995–2005: Al-Arabi

Senior career*
Years	Team	Apps	(Gls)
2005–2020	Al-Arabi	265	(35)

International career^{‡}
2008–2017	Kuwait	44	(3)
- * Club domestic league appearances and goals as of October 25, 2015 ‡ National team caps and goals as of November 28, 2017

Ali Maqseed (Arabic: علي مقصيد; born December 11, 1986) is a Kuwaiti football midfielder. He plays left back or left wing with many other positions for Al Arabi SC in VIVA Premier League and the Kuwait national football team.

Ali first joined the first-team when he was 18 years old.

Maqseed is well known for his talented dribbling and speed, due to that he is nicknamed "Al-Janah Al-Ta'ier" (The Flying Wing). Ali Himself has rejected all offers from other clubs around the world staying loyal for his club.

Ali started playing for the Kuwait national football team in 2008, but initially he never got to play a lot.

Ali played for Al-Arabi in the 2007 AFC Champions League group stage.

Maqseed has one son named Haidar.

On October 29, 2015 he was nominated for UAFA Arabian Footballer of the Year 2015 with Mohamed Salah and Asian Player of the Year 2015.

== Professional career ==
=== Al-Arabi ===
==== 2005-06 ====
Ali was called up to the first team while he was still young in age (18 years). Later that season he made his debut for the club against Al-Sahel SC and played 8 other matches later that season. although the club lost Al-Kurafi Cup Final. He later won the Kuwait Emir Cup after beating Qadsia SC 2-0. Ali played his first final in his career giving Ali his first professional club title with Al-Arabi.

What A Debut Season i had with the Club even winning my first Professional title with the Club What a great Honour

— Ali Maqseed to Club officials

Maqseed was later named Al-Arabi SC best U-23 player of the year. Although he didn't play a lot with the first-team he played most of the season with the reserves in the reserves League. Many other Newspapers started naming him the best dribbler Kuwait would see in years.

Before the final few weeks to the end of the season he was in Al-Arabi's 2006 AFC Champions League Squad but didn't play due to injury.

At the end of the season the club extended Maqaseed's contract for 6 more years with the club.

==== 2006-07 ====
After returning from injury Maqseed was the main option for the team as a first-team player.

Throughout the season Maqseed was selected for Al-Arabi SC best U-23 player of the year again.

On February 22, 2007 he played his first Kuwait Crown Prince Cup Final which Al-Arabi won 1–0 against Kazma gave him his first Crown Prince trophy and 2nd trophy with the club.

He was later called up for 2007 AFC Champions League squad he played his first match against Zawra in the group stage.

==== 2007-08 ====
He scored in 2007-08 Kuwait Emir Cup Final at half time but the game was stopped due to the sheikh died between the game. The game was played again after 1 week Al-Arabi beat Al-Salmiya SC 2-1 giving him his 3rd title.

==== 2008-09 ====
After the FA announced the new Kuwait Super Cup which was played by Al-Arabi against Kuwait SC the match ended 1-0 and he won his 4th title in his career.

VIVA Premier League team of the week 16

On October 29, 2015 nominated for UAFA Arabian Footballer of the Year 2015

== International career ==
=== International goals ===
Scores and results list Kuwait's goal tally first.

Goal	Date	Venue	Opponent	Score	Result	Competition
1.	31 October 2014	Dubai Club Stadium, Dubai, United Arab Emirates	North Korea	1–0	1–0	Friendly
2.	22 December 2014	Al-Hamriya Sports Club Stadium, Sharjah, United Arab Emirates	Iraq	1–0	1–1	Friendly
3.	3 September 2015	Abdullah bin Khalifa Stadium, Doha, Qatar	Myanmar	2–0	9–0	2018 FIFA World Cup qualification

== Honours ==
Al-Arabi

- Kuwait Emir Cup: 2005–06, 2007–08, 2019-20
- Kuwait Crown Prince Cup: 2006–07, 2011–12, 2013–14
- Kuwait Super Cup: 2008, 2012
- Kuwait Federation Cup: 2013–14

Kuwait

- Arabian Gulf Cup: 2010

Individual

- UAFA Arabian Footballer of the Year 2015: nominated
- Asian Player of the Year 2015: top nomination
- VIVA Premier League 1st phase Team: 2015–16
