= Dalibor Starčević =

Croatian football manager and player (born 1975)

Personal information
- Date of birth: 22 January 1975 (age 51)
- Place of birth: Rijeka, SFR Yugoslavia
- Height: 1.91 m (6 ft 3 in)
- Position: Defender

Senior career*
Years	Team	Apps	(Gls)
2001–2002	Orijent		
2002–2003	Primorje	16	(0)
2003–2004	Pomorac		
2004–2005	Istra 1961		
2005–2006	Koper	0	(0)
2006–2007	Rijeka	15	(1)
2007–2008	Inter Zaprešić	23	(1)
2009–2010	Orijent		

Managerial career
- 2013: Krk
- 2015–2018: Qadsia
- 2019: Al-Jazeera Club
- 2019–2020: Al Urooba
- 2022: Al-Fahaheel
- 2022–2023: Al-Khaldiya
- 2024: MA Tétouan
- * Club domestic league appearances and goals

Dalibor Starčević (Arabic: داليبور; born 22 January 1975) is a Croatian football coach and former player.

== Managerial career ==
Starčević started his managerial career with NK Krk. In 2019, he was appointed head coach of Al-Jazeera Club in the Jordanian Pro League, a position he held until March 2019. After that, he coached Al Urooba in the United Arab Emirates.
