= The Sultan Center =

Multinational retail chain

Sultan
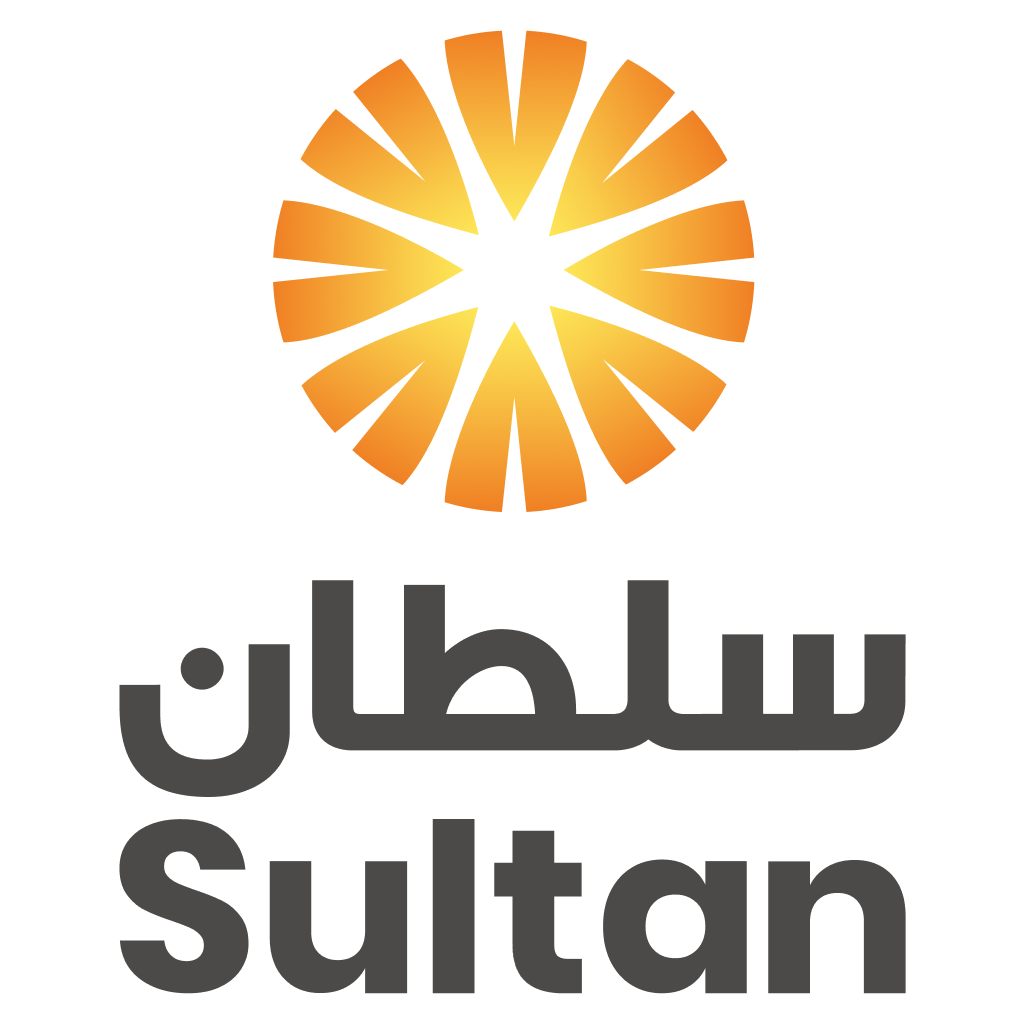
- Native name: سلطان
- Type: Shareholding company
- Industry: Retail
- Founded: 1981 by Jamil Sultan
- Headquarters: al-Dajeej, Farwaniya Governorate, Kuwait
- Key people: Tarek Sultan (Chairman)
- Products: Retail Stores, Consumer Goods, E-Commerce, Restaurants, Investments
- Website: www.sultan-center.com

Sultan (Arabic: سلطان) is a retail store chain based in the state of Kuwait.

== History ==
The four-decade-long story of Sultan was founded by Jamil Sultan. In 1981, he established the first self-service retail store in Kuwait; it was based in Shuwaikh and took on a Home Center format. Jamil Sultan is regarded as a visionary and pioneer in the business community of Kuwait. In addition to founding Sultan, he propelled Agility Logistics, a state-owned warehouse company into a worldwide logistics firm, and he was the Vice-Chairman of National Real Estate Company Kuwait (NREC), a leading real estate investment and development firm present in the Middle East and Africa.

The business ventured into the food retail industry with the opening of the Salmiya store in 1986 that is still serving customers with care as Sultan's flagship store.

== Retail presence ==
Sultan currently operates 70 stores in 4 countries. It owns over 40 stores in Kuwait with a running online shopping service. In the Sultanate of Oman, where it first expanded outside Kuwait, it operates 7 retails stores. In addition to that, it owns 17 stores in Jordan and 3 in Bahrain. In February 2020 Sultan celebrated the launch of its new flagship store in Kuwait during an opening ceremony held at the store’s new location in Al Kout Mall.
