= Farwaniya Stadium =

Sports venue in Kuwait

Coordinates: 29°17′20″N 47°57′46″E

Farwaniya Stadium is a multi-use stadium in Al-Farwaniyah, Kuwait. It is generally used for football matches and is the home stadium of Al Tadamun SC, a professional football club. The stadium holds 14,000 people.

== See also ==
- List of football stadiums in Kuwait
