= Alex Lima =

Brazilian footballer (born 1988)

Personal information
- Full name: Alex Tenorio Rodrigues de Lima
- Date of birth: 2 October 1988 (age 38)
- Place of birth: Maceió, Brazil
- Height: 1.83 m (6 ft 0 in)
- Position: Centre back

Team information
- Current team: Al-Salmiya
- Number: 88

Youth career
- CRB

Senior career*
| Years | Team | Apps | (Gls) |
| 2009–2010 | CRB | 7 | (0) |
| 2011 | Bahia de Feira | 12 | (0) |
| 2011–2012 | Grêmio Barueri | 38 | (5) |
| 2013 | Avaí | 26 | (1) |
| 2014 | Atlético-GO | 7 | (1) |
| 2014 | Ceará | 12 | (0) |
| 2015 | Portuguesa | 0 | (0) |
| 2015 | Confiança | 7 | (0) |
| 2015–2019 | Kazma SC | 51 | (16) |
| 2019– | Al-Salmiya | 95 | (19) |
- * Club domestic league appearances and goals as of 15 April 2016

Alex Tenorio Rodrigues de Lima (born 2 October 1988), known as Alex Lima, is a Brazilian footballer who plays as a central defender for Kuwaiti Premier League club Al-Salmiya.

== Career ==
Born in Maceió, Alagoas, Alex Lima was a CRB's youth graduate, and made his senior debuts in 2009. After representing Bahia de Feira and Grêmio Barueri, he signed for Avaí on 18 December 2012.

In January 2014 Alex Lima moved to Atlético Goianiense. On 14 March, after appearing sparingly, he joined Ceará.

On 5 January 2015 Alex Lima signed for Portuguesa, freshly relegated to Série C. He made his debut for the club on 1 February, starting and scoring his side's second in a 3–2 away win against Ponte Preta for the Campeonato Paulista championship.

On 12 May 2015, Alex Lima joined Confiança, shortly after being released by Lusa. On 27 July, he moved abroad and joined Kazma SC.
