= Abu Halifa =

Abu Halifa أبو حليفة Abou Halifa
- Area
- Location in Kuwait
- Coordinates: 29°7′56″N 48°7′34″E
- Country: Kuwait
- Governorate: Al Ahmadi

Government
- Elevation: 16 ft (5 m)

Abu Halifa or Abu Hulayfah or Abu Huleifa or Abu Haleifah (Arabic: أبو حليفة) is an area in Kuwait City, located in the Abu Halifa District of the Al Ahmadi Governorate in Kuwait. The area got its name on account of being rich in small plants called "Hanifa" (حنيفا). Abu Halifa is the location of the Box Hill Institute of TAFE, the Kuwait Magic Mall, and Sahel (Kuwaiti football club)Stadium. Abu Halifa has major facilities ranging from mosques, restaurants, food courts, parks, walking tracks and pharmacies to malls, beaches and schools. Abu Halifa's population comprises a majority of Indian migrant workers.
