= Mubarak Al-Aiar Stadium =

Multiuse stadium in Jahra, Kuwait

Coordinates: 29°20′42″N 47°41′45″E

Al-Shabab Mubarak Al-Aiar Stadium
- Interactive map of Al-Shabab Mubarak Al-Aiar Stadium
- Full name: Al-Shabab Mubarak Al-Aiar Stadium
- Location: Jahra, Kuwait
- Capacity: 17,000

Tenant
- Al Jahra

The Al-Shabab Mubarak Al-Aiar Stadium is a multi-use stadium in Jahra, Kuwait. It is used mostly for football matches, on club level by Al Jahra of the Kuwaiti Premier League. The stadium has a capacity of 17,000 spectators.

== See also ==
- List of football stadiums in Kuwait
