= Al-Ahmadi Stadium =

Stadium in Al-Ahmadi, Kuwait

Coordinates: 29°5′28″N 48°4′42″E

Al Ahmadi Stadium
- Interactive map of Al Ahmadi Stadium
- Full name: Al-Ahmadi Stadium
- Location: Al-Ahmadi, Kuwait
- Operator: Al-Shabab
- Capacity: 18,000
- Surface: Grass

Tenant
- Al-Shabab

Al-Ahmadi Stadium is a multi-use stadium in Al-Ahmadi, Kuwait. It is currently used mostly for football matches and is the home stadium of Al-Shabab. The stadium holds 18,000 people.

== See also ==
- List of football stadiums in Kuwait
