= Thamir Stadium =

Stadium in Salmiya, Kuwait

Coordinates: 29°20′27″N 48°5′18″E

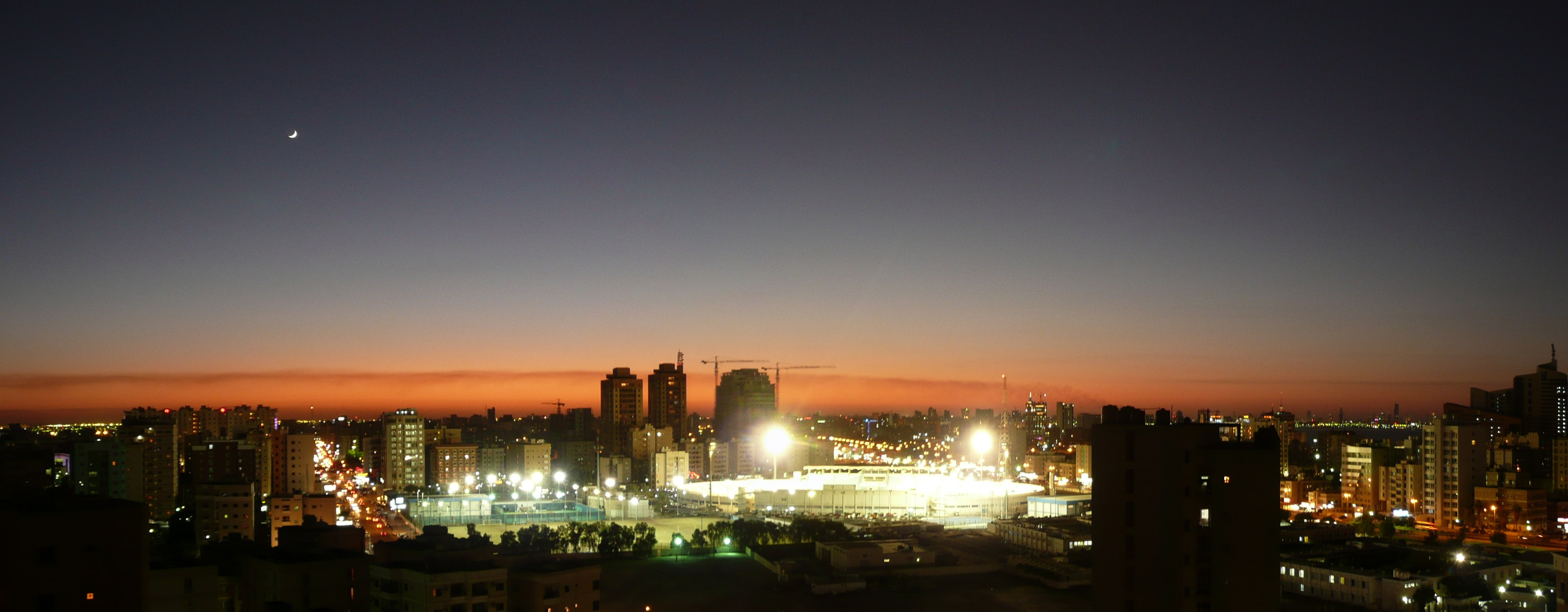
- Interactive map of Thamir Stadium
- Location: Al Salmiya, Kuwait
- Capacity: 16,105
- Surface: Grass

Construction
- Opened: 28 December 2004

Tenant
- Al Salmiya Club

Thamir Stadium is a multi-purpose stadium in Al Salmiya, Kuwait. It is currently used mostly for football matches and is the home stadium of Al Salmiya Club. The stadium holds 16,105 people.

== See also ==
- List of football stadiums in Kuwait
