= Sabah Al Salem Stadium =

Multi-purpose stadium in Kuwait City, Kuwait

Coordinates: 29°21′25″N 48°0′1″E

- The Castle of Cups
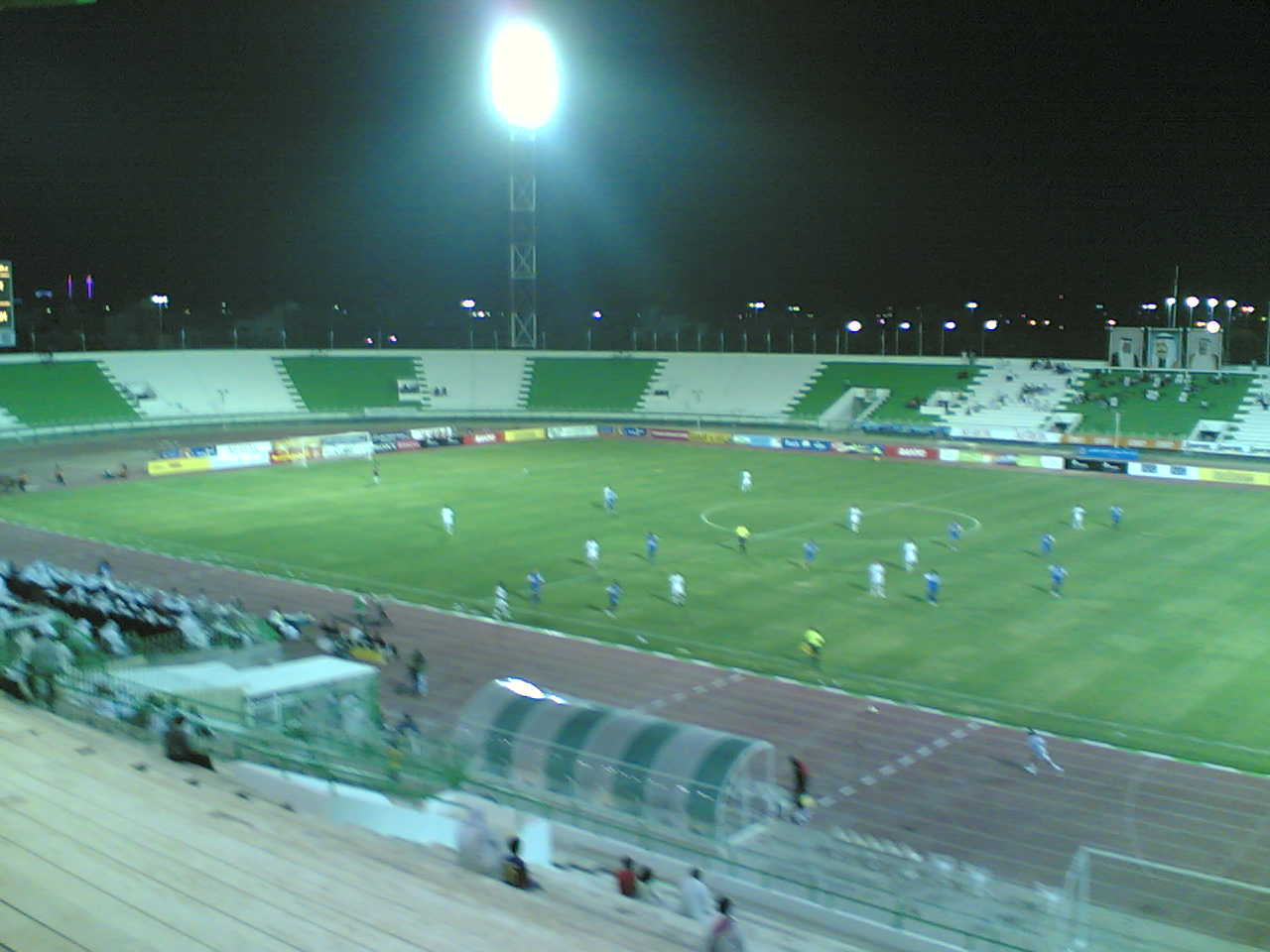
- Interactive map of Sabah Al Salem Stadium
- Full name: Sabah Al Salem Stadium
- Location: Mansuriyah, Kuwait City, Kuwait
- Owner: Public Authority For Youth And Sport
- Operator: Al-Arabi
- Capacity: 26,000
- Surface: Grass

Construction
- Built: 1977
- Opened: 5 January 1979

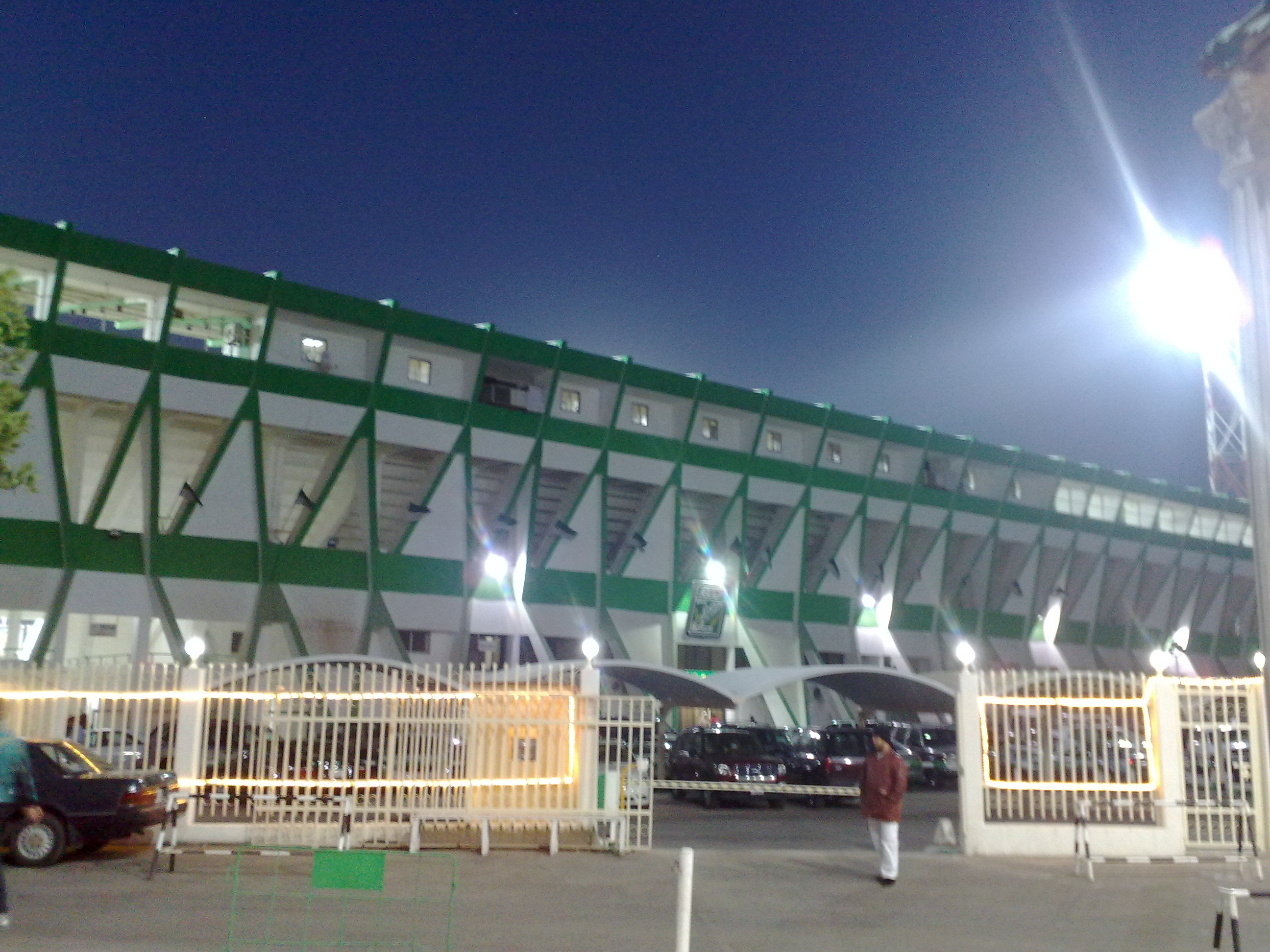
The stadium from the outside.

Sabah al-Salem Stadium is a multi-purpose stadium in Kuwait City, Kuwait. It is currently used mostly for football matches. The stadium holds 26,000 people and had hosted many matches of the 1980 AFC Asian Cup, including the final. It is the home stadium of Al-Arabi.

Preceded by Azadi Stadium (Iran) Tehran	AFC Asian Cup; Final Venue; 1980	Succeeded by National Stadium; Singapore

== See also ==
- List of football stadiums in Kuwait
