= Ali Sabah Al-Salem Stadium =

Multi-use stadium in Ardiya, Kuwait

Coordinates: 29°16′19″N 47°55′28″E

Ali Al-Salem Al-Sabah Stadium
- Interactive map of Ali Al-Salem Al-Sabah Stadium
- Full name: Ali Al-Salem Al-Sabah Stadium
- Location: Al Farwaniyah, Kuwait
- Capacity: 11,000

Tenant
- Al-Nasr SC

Ali Al-Salem Al-Sabah Stadium is a multi-use stadium in Ardiya, Kuwait. It is currently used mostly for football matches, on club level by Al-Nasr SC of the Kuwaiti Premier League. The stadium has a capacity of 11,000 spectators.

== International Soccer Matches ==
Date	Competition	Team	Res	Team
11 Sep 2018	International Friendly	Kuwait	2-2	Iraq

== See also ==
- List of football stadiums in Kuwait
