= Al-Sadaqua Walsalam Stadium =

Sports venue in Kuwait

Coordinates: 29°19′44″N 47°59′16″E

Al-Sadaqa Walsalam Stadium
- (Peace and Friendship Stadium)
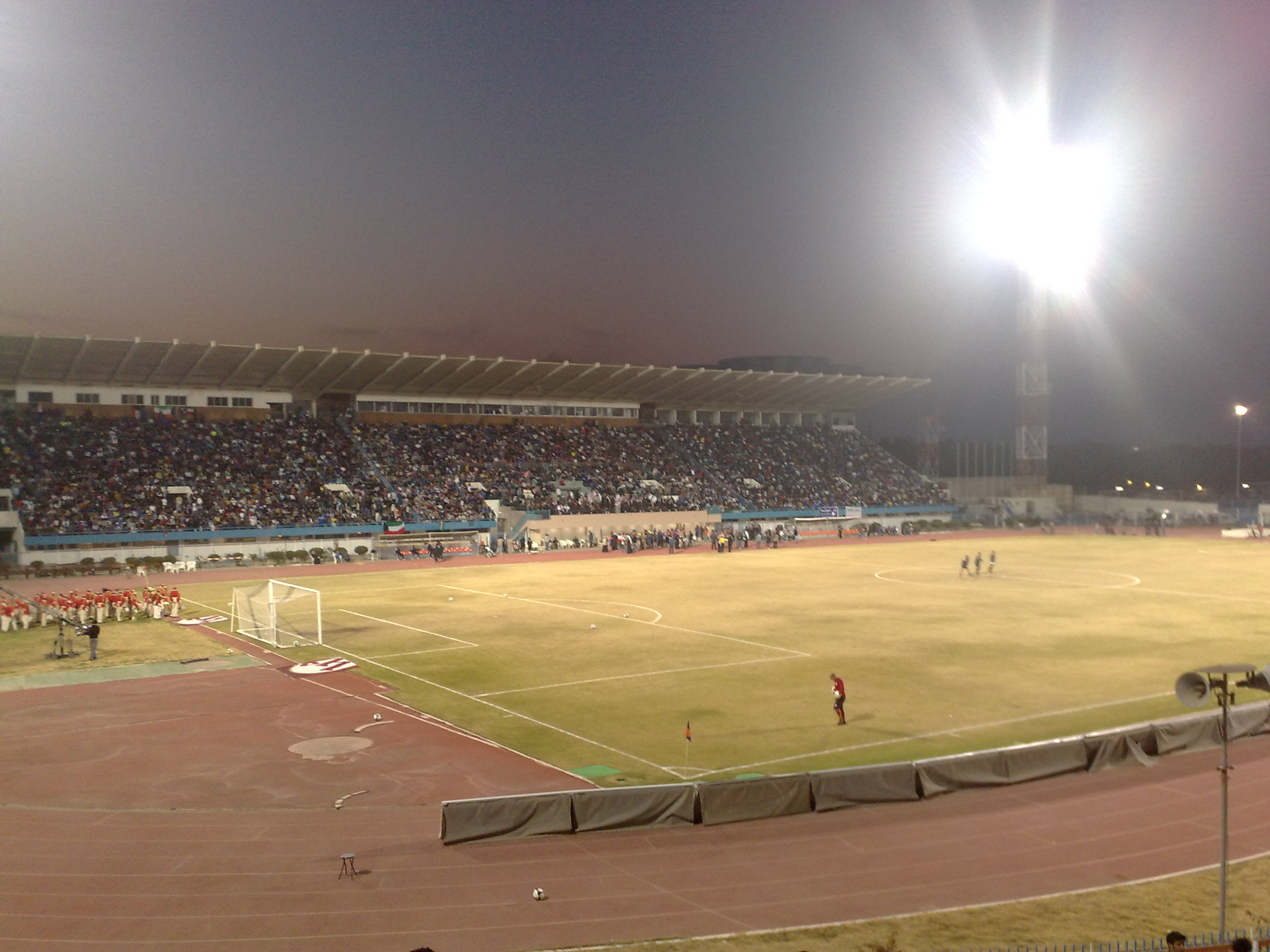
- Interactive map of Al-Sadaqa Walsalam Stadium
- Former names: Kazma Stadium
- Location: Adiliya, Kuwait City, Kuwait
- Capacity: 21,500
- Surface: Grass

Tenants
- Kazma; Kuwait national football team 10th Gulf Cup; 16th Gulf Cup; 2012 West Asian Football Federation Championship

The Al-Sadaqa Walsalam Stadium is a multi-purpose stadium in Adiliya Kuwait City, Kuwait. It is currently used mostly for football matches. The second largest stadium in Kuwait, it can accommodate 21,500 spectators. The stadium has hosted many finals for the Kuwait Emir Cup and Kuwait Crown Cup. In addition, 2 Gulf Cup Tournaments were held in this Stadium, the first taking place in 1990 where Kuwait won the 10th Gulf Cup trophy, and the second in 2003, where they finished 6th. WWE also hosted its Kuwait International Tournament at the stadium in 1997.

This stadium is the home ground for Kazma.

== Naming ==
Its name means "Friendship and Peace", a name it earned when it was host to a football match between Iraq and Iran after the end of the first Gulf War for the 1989 Peace and Friendship Cup.

== Greece ==
Greece also has a stadium called Peace and Friendship Stadium (Στάδιο Ειρήνης και Φιλίας) in Piraeus.

== See also ==
- List of football stadiums in Kuwait
