= Al Ahmadi, Kuwait =

Al Ahmadi الأحمدي
- Area
- Location within Kuwait
- Coordinates: 29°5′N 48°5′E
- Country: Kuwait
- Governorate: Ahmadi Governorate

Area
  - Total: 60 km^{2} (23 sq mi)

Population (2025)
  - Total: 23,913
- Time zone: UTC+3 (AST)

Al Ahmadi (Arabic: الأحمدي) is an area in Kuwait, and the capital of Al Ahmadi Governorate. It was founded in 1946 with the discovery of oil there. It contains the headquarters for the Kuwait National Petroleum Company (KNPC) and Kuwait Oil Company (KOC), with many of its refineries located there.

== History ==
Covering an area of 60 km^{2}, Al Ahmadi is the capital of this Kuwait province with the same name created in 1946, and named after Ahmad Al-Jaber Al-Sabah who ruled the province from 1921 to 1956.

After the discovery of oil in the region British and Indian expats started settling in Al Ahmadi. The town has American layouts and designed keeping in mind British preferences. The roads intersect at right angles. Areas close to the sea have buildings on the sea-facing hill slopes. The Ahmadi Town was divided by Orientation into North, South, East, and West. The North Ahmadi side is where the residential area is prominent. It also boasts of a recreational club called the Hubara, the Kuwait Golf Club Course is located here.
