= Farwaniya, Kuwait =

Area in Farwaniya Governorate, Kuwait

Coordinates: 29.277°N 47.959°E

Farwaniya (Arabic: الفروانية, Gulf Arabic: /ɪlfərwaːniːjə/) is an area of Farwaniya Governorate, located within the agglomeration of Kuwait City, Kuwait. The Ghazali Expressway passes to the west of the district and the road leading to Kuwait International Airport to the east, both roads in a north–south direction. Farwaniya contains mosques, hospitals, a university, a park and other facilities. It is the most populated area in Kuwait.
