= Al Kuwait Sports Club Stadium =

Stadium in Kuwait City, Kuwait

Coordinates: 29°20′33″N 47°57′7″E

Kuwait Sports Club Stadium
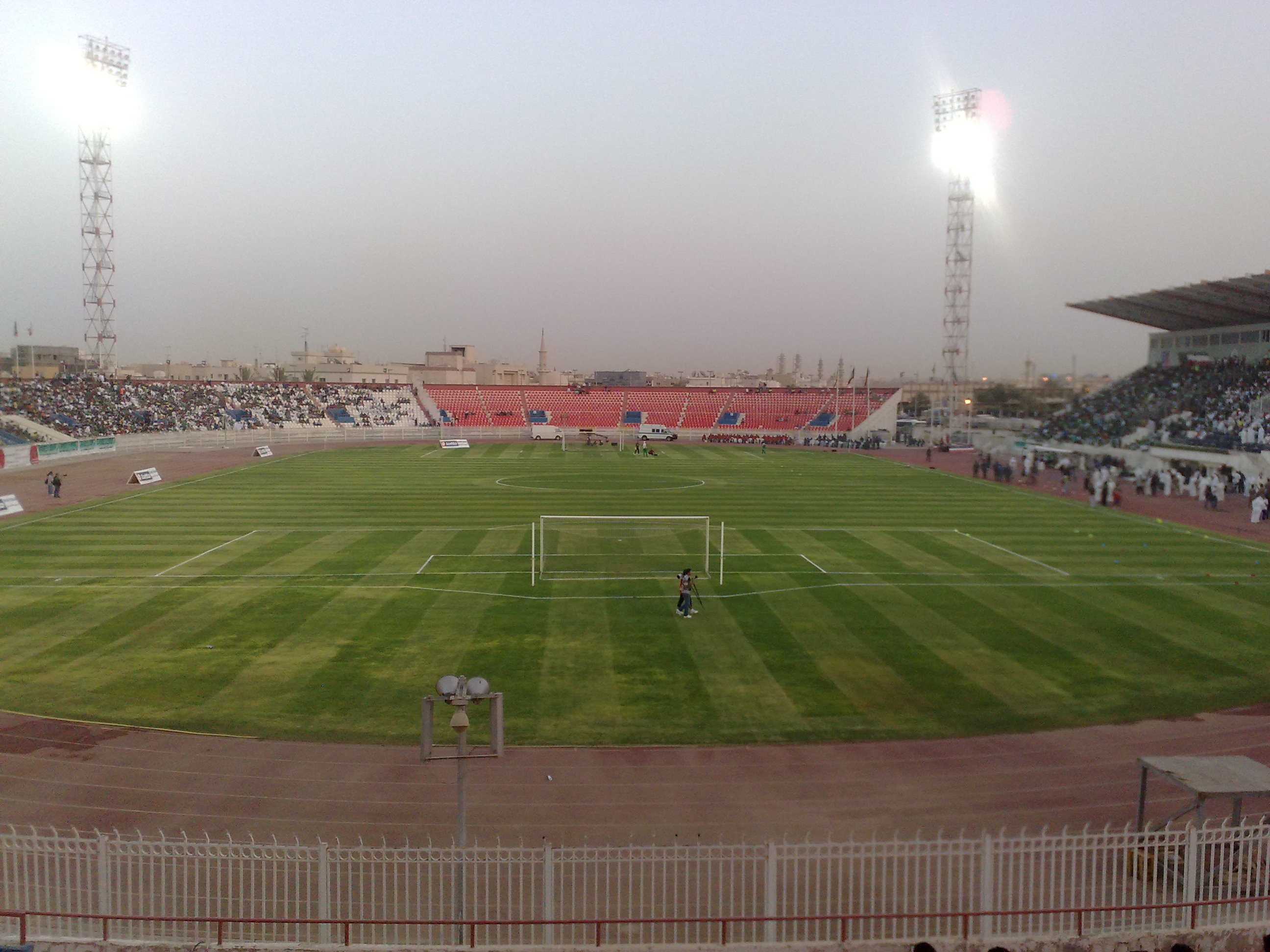
- The stadium before the final of 2009 Kuwait Emir Cup
- Interactive map of Kuwait Sports Club Stadium
- Location: Kaifan, Kuwait
- Capacity: 12,350
- Surface: Grass

Construction
- Opened: 1964

Tenants
- Kuwait SC; Al-Arabi SC (selected matches)

Kuwait Sports Club Stadium is a multi-purpose stadium in Kuwait City, Kuwait. It is currently used mostly for football matches and hosts Kuwait SC. The stadium holds 12,350 people. This stadium had also hosted Kuwait's national team matches during the 2010 FIFA World Cup qualification. The stadium has hosted the final matches of the Kuwait Emir Cup and Kuwait Crown Cup for the last 5 seasons. This stadium also hosted matches for the national team during the 3rd Arabian Gulf Cup, where Kuwait won their third title after winning 4–0 against Saudi Arabia.

== See also ==
- List of football stadiums in Kuwait

Preceded by Vacant ( Two-legged finals )	AFC Cup; Final Venue; 2009	Succeeded by Jaber Al-Ahmad International Stadium
