= Bahrain national football team results (2020–present) =

This article provides details of international football games played by the Bahrain national football team from 2020 to present.

== Results ==
Key
Win
Draw
Defeat

=== 2020 ===
7 November 2020 Friendly	Bahrain	1–0	Tajikistan	Dubai, United Arab Emirates
19:30 UTC+4	Al-Romaihi 44'	Report		Stadium: Police Officers' Club Stadium; Attendance: 0 Referee: Ahmed Eisa Darwish (United Arab Emirates)

12 November 2020 Friendly	Lebanon	1–3	Bahrain	Dubai, United Arab Emirates
18:00 UTC+4	Kdouh 44'	Report	Isa 53'; Al Aswad 58'; Marhoon 82'	Stadium: Police Officers' Club Stadium; Attendance: 0 Referee: Ahmed Al Ali (Kuwait)

16 November 2020 Friendly	United Arab Emirates	1–3	Bahrain	Dubai, United Arab Emirates
18:00 UTC+4	Caio 34'	Report	Marhoon 75'; Al-Romaihi 82', 86'	Stadium: Al Maktoum Stadium; Attendance: 0 Referee: Ahmed Al Ali (Kuwait)

=== 2021 ===
25 March 2021 Friendly	Bahrain	3–1	Syria	Riffa, Bahrain
	Abdullatif 21' (pen.), 36'; Marhoon 68'	Report	Osman 32' (pen.)	Stadium: Bahrain National Stadium; Referee: Khalid Marhoun Al Shaqsi (Oman)

30 March 2021 Friendly	Bahrain	1–2	Jordan	Riffa, Bahrain
19:00 UTC+3	Al-Romaihi 78' (pen.)	Report	Faisal 32'; Al-Rawashdeh 52'	Stadium: Bahrain National Stadium; Referee: Sultan Mohamed Al Hammadi (United Arab Emirates)

23 May 2021 Friendly	Ukraine	1–1	Bahrain	Kharkiv, Ukraine
21:00 UTC+3	Tsyhankov 90+1'	Report	Saeed 74' (pen.)	Stadium: Metalist Oblast Sports Complex; Referee: Pavel Orel (Czech Republic)

28 May 2021 Friendly	Bahrain	2–0	Malaysia	Riffa, Bahrain
19:30 UTC+3	Abduljabbar 41' (pen.); Marhoon 61'	Report		Stadium: Bahrain National Stadium; Referee: Turki Al-Khudhayr (Saudi Arabia)

3 June 2021 2022 World Cup qualification	Bahrain	8–0	Cambodia	Riffa, Bahrain
19:30 UTC+3	Al Aswad 8', 71'; Al-Romaihi 45+2'; Madan 46', 65'; Al-Shaikh 51'; Abdullatif 75', 90+2'	Report		Stadium: Bahrain National Stadium; Referee: Hiroyuki Kimura (Japan)

7 June 2021 2022 World Cup qualification	Iran	3–0	Bahrain	Riffa, Bahrain
19:30 UTC+3	Azmoun 54', 61'; Taremi 79'	Report		Stadium: Bahrain National Stadium; Referee: Fu Ming (China)

15 June 2021 2022 World Cup qualification	Bahrain	4–0	Hong Kong	Riffa, Bahrain
19:30 UTC+3	Saeed 49'; Isa 54' (pen.), 70'; Abdullatif 90' (pen.)	Report		Stadium: Bahrain National Stadium; Referee: Yaqoob Abdul Baki (Oman)

25 June 2021 2021 FIFA Arab Cup qualification	Bahrain	2–0	Kuwait	Doha, Qatar
20:00 UTC+3	Haram 74'; Isa 90+4'	Report		Stadium: Khalifa International Stadium; Referee: Mustapha Ghorbal (Algeria)

1 September 2021 Friendly	Bahrain	6–1	Haiti	Riffa, Bahrain
19:00 UTC+3	Madan 5', 27'; Al-Romaihi 13' (pen.); Marhoon 22'; Bughammar 24'; Haram 66'	Report	François 54'	Stadium: Bahrain National Stadium; Referee: Ahmed Eisa Darwish (United Arab Emirates)

7 September 2021 Friendly	Bahrain	1–2	Jordan	Riffa, Bahrain
19:00 UTC+3	Mohammed 90+3' (pen.)	Report	Olwan 15'; Faisal 46'	Stadium: Bahrain National Stadium; Referee: Khaled Al-Taris (Saudi Arabia)

6 October 2021 Friendly	Bahrain	4–0	Curaçao	Riffa, Bahrain
19:00 UTC+3				Stadium: Bahrain National Stadium

12 October 2021 Friendly	Bahrain	0–1	New Zealand	Riffa, Bahrain
19:00 UTC+3		Report	Kirwan 89'	Stadium: Bahrain National Stadium; Referee: Mahmoud El Banna (Egypt)

16 November 2021 Friendly	Bahrain	4–2	Kyrgyzstan	Riffa, Bahrain
19:00 UTC+3	Madan 23'; Marhoon 45+1', 50'; Al Aswad 71'	Report	Kichin 16' (pen.); Abdurakhmanov 24'	Stadium: Bahrain National Stadium

30 November 2021 2021 FIFA Arab Cup	Qatar	1–0	Bahrain	Al Khor, Qatar
13:00 UTC+3	Hatem 69'	Report		Stadium: Al Bayt Stadium; Referee: Szymon Marciniak (Poland)

3 December 2021 2021 FIFA Arab Cup	Bahrain	0–0	Iraq	Doha, Qatar
13:00 UTC+3		Report		Stadium: Al Thumama Stadium; Referee: Janny Sikazwe (Zambia)

6 December 2021 2021 FIFA Arab Cup	Oman	3–0	Bahrain	Al Rayyan, Qatar
22:00 UTC+3	R. Al-Alawi 41'; A. Al-Alawi 50'; Al-Hajri 59'	Report		Stadium: Ahmed bin Ali Stadium; Referee: Ryuji Sato (Japan)

=== 2022 ===
27 January 2022 Friendly	Bahrain	3–1	Uganda	Riffa, Bahrain
18:00 UTC+3	Abduljabbar 29' (pen.); Al Khattal 55'; Al Hashash 89'	Report	Karisa 9'	Stadium: Bahrain National Stadium; Attendance: 100; Referee: Khalid Marhoun Al Shaqsi (Oman)

1 February 2022 Friendly	Bahrain	1–0	DR Congo	Riffa, Bahrain
19:00 UTC+4	Isa 48'	Report		Stadium: Bahrain National Stadium; Attendance: 50; Referee: Ahmed Eisa Darwish (United Arab Emirates)

23 March 2022 Friendly	Bahrain	2–1	India	Riffa, Bahrain
19:00 UTC+3	Al-Hardan 37'; Al-Humaidan 88'	Report	Bheke 59'	Stadium: Bahrain National Stadium; Referee: Sadam Omara (Jordan)

26 March 2022 Friendly	Bahrain	1–0	Burundi	Arad, Bahrain
19:00 UTC+3		Report		Stadium: Al Muharraq Stadium; Referee: Ali Al Samaheeji (Bahrain)

29 March 2022 Friendly	Bahrain	0–1	Belarus	Riffa, Bahrain
20:00 UTC+3		Report	Solovey 45+1'	Stadium: Bahrain National Stadium; Referee: Majed Mohammed Al Shamrani (Saudi Arabia)

27 May 2022 Friendly	Bahrain	2–0	Myanmar	Bangkok, Thailand
19:00 UTC+7	89' (pen.); 90+1'	Report		Stadium: BG Stadium

31 May 2022 Friendly	Thailand	1–2	Bahrain	Thanya Buri, Thailand
19:00 UTC+7	Dangda 4' (pen.)	Report	Al-Khatal 45+1'; Isa 90+1'	Stadium: BG Stadium

8 June 2022 2023 Asian Cup qualification	Bahrain	2–0	Bangladesh	Kuala Lumpur, Malaysia
17:15 UTC+8	Haram 34'; Al-Aswad 42'	Report		Stadium: Bukit Jalil National Stadium; Attendance: 826; Referee: Tejas Nagvenkar (India)

11 June 2022 2023 Asian Cup qualification	Malaysia	1–2	Bahrain	Kuala Lumpur, Malaysia
21:00 UTC+8	Sumareh 55'	Report	Haram 57'; Helal 81' (pen.)	Stadium: Bukit Jalil National Stadium; Attendance: 63,925; Referee: Sadullo Gulmurodi (Tajikistan)

14 June 2022 2023 Asian Cup qualification	Bahrain	1–0	Turkmenistan	Kuala Lumpur, Malaysia
17:15 UTC+8	Helal 23' (pen.)	Report		Stadium: Bukit Jalil National Stadium; Attendance: 2,970; Referee: Nivon Robesh Gamini (Sri Lanka)

23 September 2022 Friendly	Bahrain	1–2	Cape Verde	Riffa, Bahrain
18:30 UTC+3	Haram 29' (pen.)	Report	Diney 12'; 54' (o.g.)	Stadium: Bahrain National Stadium; Referee: Ahmed Al-Kaf (Oman)

27 September 2022 Friendly	Bahrain	0–2	Panama	Riffa, Bahrain
18:30 UTC+3		Report	Murillo 18'; Díaz 46'	Stadium: Bahrain National Stadium; Referee: Faisal Nasser Al Qahtani (Saudi Arabia)

11 November 2022 Friendly	Bahrain	2–2	Canada	Riffa, Bahrain
18:30 UTC+3	Al-Humaidan 14'; Helal 65' (pen.)	Report	Koné 6'; Haram 81' (o.g.)	Stadium: Bahrain National Stadium; Referee: Abdullah Jamali (Kuwait)

18 November 2022 Friendly	Bahrain	1–5	Serbia	Arad, Bahrain
18:30 UTC+3	Yusuf Helal 15' (pen.)	Report	Tadić 8', 50'; Vlahović 51'; Đuričić 87'; Jović 89'	Stadium: Al Muharraq Stadium; Referee: Khalid Al-Turais (Saudi Arabia)

=== 2023 ===
7 January 2023 25th Arabian Gulf Cup	Bahrain	2–1	United Arab Emirates	Basra, Iraq
16:15 UTC+3	Al-Aswad 60'; Al-Shaikh 77'	Report	Tagliabúe 90+2'	Stadium: Al-Minaa Olympic Stadium; Referee: Ahmed Al-Kaf (Oman)

10 January 2023 25th Arabian Gulf Cup	Qatar	1–2	Bahrain	Basra, Iraq
19:15 UTC+3	Alaaedin 34'	Report	Waad 72' (o.g.); Helal 89' (pen.)	Stadium: Al-Minaa Olympic Stadium; Referee: Ilgiz Tantashev (Uzbekistan)

13 January 2023 25th Arabian Gulf Cup	Bahrain	1–1	Kuwait	Basra, Iraq
18:00 UTC+3	Abdullatif 26'	Report	Al-Khaldi 45'	Stadium: Basra International Stadium; Referee: István Kovács (Romania)

16 January 2023 25th Arabian Gulf Cup	Bahrain	0–1	Oman	Basra, Iraq
20:15 UTC+3		Report	Al-Yahmadi 83'	Stadium: Al-Minaa Olympic Stadium; Referee: Adel Al-Naqbi (United Arab Emirates)

25 March 2023 Friendly	Bahrain	1–2	Palestine	Arad, Bahrain
21:30 UTC+3	Saeed 80'	Report	Termanini 51'; Batran 61'	Stadium: Al Muharraq Stadium; Referee: Mohammad Ghabayen (Jordan)

28 March 2023 Friendly	Bahrain	1–0	Syria	Arad, Bahrain
21:30 UTC+3	Al-Khalasi 43'	Report		Stadium: Al Muharraq Stadium; Referee: Yousif Saeed Hasan (Iraq)

7 September Friendly	Kuwait	3–1	Bahrain	United Arab Emirates
				Stadium: TBD

12 September Friendly	Bahrain	1–1	Turkmenistan	Dubai, United Arab Emirates
20:00 UTC+4	Marhoon 13'	Report	Çaryýew 29'	Stadium: Police Officers Club Stadium

12 October Friendly	Bahrain	2–0	Kyrgyzstan	Arad, Bahrain
				Stadium: Al Muharraq Stadium

16 October Friendly	Bahrain	1–0	Philippines	Arad, Bahrain
				Stadium: Al Muharraq Stadium

16 November 2023 2026 World Cup qualification	Yemen	0–2	Bahrain	Abha, Saudi Arabia
21:00 UTC+3		Report	Marhoon 38'; Al Zubaidi 48' (o.g.)	Stadium: Prince Sultan bin Abdul Aziz Stadium; Attendance: 1,291; Referee: Kim Jong-hyeok (South Korea)

21 November 2023 2026 World Cup qualification	Bahrain	0–2	United Arab Emirates	Riffa, Bahrain
18:45 UTC+4		Report	Ramadan 36'; Mabkhout 90' (pen.)	Stadium: Bahrain National Stadium; Referee: Mohammed Al-Hoish (Saudi Arabia)

=== 2024 ===
6 January 2024 Friendly	Bahrain	0–2	Australia	Abu Dhabi, United Arab Emirates
17:00 UTC+3		Report	Benaddi 35' (o.g.); Duke 61'	Stadium: Baniyas Stadium; Referee: Mohamed Al-Harmoodi (United Arab Emirates)

15 January 2024 2023 Asian Cup	South Korea	3–1	Bahrain	Al Rayyan, Qatar
14:30 UTC+3	Hwang In-beom 38'; Lee Kang-in 56', 68'	Report	Al-Hashsash 51'	Stadium: Jassim bin Hamad Stadium; Referee: Ma Ning (China)

20 January 2024 2023 Asian Cup GS	Bahrain	1–0	Malaysia	Al Rayyan, Qatar
22:30 UTC+8	Madan 90+6'	Report		Stadium: Jassim Bin Hamad Stadium; Attendance: 10,386; Referee: Ahmed Al-Kaf (Oman)

25 January 2024 2023 Asian Cup GS	Jordan	0–1	Bahrain	Al Rayyan, Qatar
14:30 UTC+3				Stadium: Khalifa International Stadium

31 January 2024 2023 AFC Asian Cup R16	Bahrain	1–3	Japan	Doha, Qatar
14:30 UTC+3				Stadium: Al Thumama Stadium

21 March 2024 2026 World Cup qualification	Nepal	0–5	Bahrain	Riffa, Bahrain
22:00 UTC+3		Report	Al-Humaidan 2'; Baqer 9'; Madan 45+4'; Al-Khatal 87'; Abdullatif 90+6' (pen.)	Stadium: Bahrain National Stadium; Attendance: 5,041; Referee: Alex King (Australia)

26 March 2024 2026 World Cup qualification	Bahrain	3–0	Nepal	Riffa, Bahrain
22:00 UTC+3	Baqer 7'; Helal 18' (pen.); Al-Aswad 36'	Report		Stadium: Bahrain National Stadium; Attendance: 2,475; Referee: Ryo Tanimoto (Japan)

6 June 2024 2026 World Cup qualification	Bahrain	0–0	Yemen	Riffa, Bahrain
20:30 UTC+3		Report		Stadium: Bahrain National Stadium; Attendance: 2,632; Referee: Nazmi Nasaruddin (Malaysia)

11 June 2024 2026 World Cup qualification	United Arab Emirates	1–1	Bahrain	Dubai, United Arab Emirates
21:00 UTC+4	Adil 10'	Report	Abduljabbar 4'	Stadium: Rashid Stadium; Referee: Ma Ning (China)

5 September 2024 2026 World Cup qualification	Australia	0–1	Bahrain	Gold Coast, Australia
20:10 UTC+10		Report	Souttar 89' (o.g.)	Stadium: Robina Stadium; Attendance: 24,644; Referee: Omar Al-Ali (United Arab Emirates)

10 September 2024 2026 World Cup qualification	Bahrain	0–5	Japan	Riffa, Bahrain
19:00 UTC+3		Report	Ueda 37' (pen.), 47'; Morita 61', 64'; Ogawa 81'	Stadium: Bahrain National Stadium; Attendance: 22,729; Referee: Rustam Lutfullin (Uzbekistan)

10 October 2026 World Cup qualification	Bahrain	2–2	Indonesia	Riffa, Bahrain
19:00 UTC+3	Marhoon 15', 90+9'	Report	Oratmangoen 45+3'; Struick 74'	Stadium: Bahrain National Stadium; Referee: Ahmed Al-Kaf (Oman)

15 October 2026 World Cup qualification	Saudi Arabia	0–0	Bahrain	Jeddah, Saudi Arabia
21:00 UTC+3		Report		Stadium: King Abdullah Sports City; Attendance: 35,437; Referee: Salman Ahmad Falahi (Qatar)

14 November World Cup qualification R3	Bahrain	0–1	China	Riffa, Bahrain
17:00 UTC+3		Report	Zhang Yuning 90+1'	Stadium: Bahrain National Stadium; Referee: Adham Makhadmeh (Jordan)

19 November World Cup qualification R3	Bahrain	2–2	Australia	Riffa, Bahrain
18:15 UTC+3	Abduljabbar 75', 77'	Report	Yengi 1', 90+6'	Stadium: Bahrain National Stadium; Referee: Ko Hyung-jin (South Korea)

22 December 26th Arabian Gulf Cup GS	Saudi Arabia	2–3	Bahrain	Kuwait City, Kuwait
20:30 UTC+3	Al-Juwayr 73'; Al-Shehri 86' (pen.)	Report	Abduljabbar 19'; Al-Humaidan 38'; Marhoon 76'	Stadium: Jaber Al-Ahmad International Stadium; Attendance: 7,726; Referee: Ahmad Al-Ali (Kuwait)

25 December 26th Arabian Gulf Cup GS	Bahrain	2–0	Iraq	Kuwait City, Kuwait
20:30 UTC+3	Madan 38', 47'	Report		Stadium: Jaber Al-Ahmad International Stadium; Attendance: 13,150; Referee: Halil Umut Meler (Turkey)

28 December 26th Arabian Gulf Cup GS	Bahrain	1–2	Yemen	Kuwait City, Kuwait
17:30 UTC+3				Stadium: Sulaibikhat Stadium

31 December 26th Arabian Gulf Cup SF	Bahrain	1–0	Kuwait	Kuwait City, Kuwait
20:45 UTC+3	Marhoon 75'	Report		Stadium: Jaber Al-Ahmad International Stadium; Attendance: 60,122; Referee: István Kovács (Romania)

=== 2025 ===
4 January 26th Arabian Gulf Cup F	Oman	1–2	Bahrain	Kuwait City, Kuwait
19:00 UTC+3	Al-Mushaifri 17'	Report	Marhoon 78' (pen.); Al-Musalami 80' (o.g.)	Stadium: Jaber Al-Ahmad International Stadium; Attendance: 57,674; Referee: Abdulrahman Al-Jassim (Qatar)

20 March World Cup qualification R3	Japan	2–0	Bahrain	Saitama, Japan
19:35 UTC+9	Kamada 66'; Kubo 87'	Report		Stadium: Saitama Stadium 2002; Attendance: 58,137; Referee: Abdulrahman Al-Jassim (Qatar)

25 March 2026 World Cup qualification R3	Indonesia	1–0	Bahrain	Jakarta, Indonesia
20:45 UTC+7	Romeny 24'	Report		Stadium: Gelora Bung Karno Stadium; Attendance: 69,599; Referee: Sadullo Gulmurodi (Tajikistan)

5 June World Cup qualification R3	Bahrain	0–2	Saudi Arabia	Riffa, Bahrain
		Report	Al-Juwayr 16'; Al-Aboud 78'	Stadium: Bahrain National Stadium; Attendance: 15,075; Referee: Ilgiz Tantashev (Uzbekistan)

10 June World Cup qualification R3	China	1–0	Bahrain	Chongqing, China
19:00 UTC+8	Wang Yudong 90+3' (pen.)	Report		Stadium: Longxing Football Stadium; Referee: Adel Al-Naqbi (United Arab Emirates)

16 July Hybrid friendly	Istra 1961 (Croatia)	3–1	Bahrain	Maribor, Slovenia
17:30 UTC+2				Stadium: Ljudski vrt

22 July Hybrid friendly	ND Primorje (Slovenia)	1–2	Bahrain	Maribor, Slovenia
16:20 UTC+2				Stadium: Ljudski vrt

3 September Closed friendly	Qatar	2–2	Bahrain	Doha, Qatar
19:15 UTC+3	Muntari 17'; Alaaeldin 87'		Al-Aswad 62' (pen.); Al-Khattal 66'	Stadium: Al Thumama Stadium

8 September Friendly	United Arab Emirates	1–0	Bahrain	Dubai, United Arab Emirates
19:30 UTC+3	Luanzinho 24'	Report		Stadium: Zabeel Stadium

9 October Friendly	Morocco	1–0	Bahrain	Rabat, Morocco
20:00 UTC+1	El Yamiq 90+4'	Report		Stadium: Prince Moulay Abdellah Stadium; Attendance: Sadok Selmi (Tunisia)

13 October Friendly	Bahrain	0–4	Egypt	Mohammedia, Morocco
20:00 UTC+1			El Solia 48'; Gaber 50'; Sherif 63'; Hamdi 90+2'	Stadium: El Bachir Stadium

17 November Friendly	Bahrain	1–2	Somalia	Riffa, Bahrain
18:30 UTC+3	Al-Romaihi 35'	Report	Omar 45'; Marsis 80'	Stadium: Bahrain National Stadium; Referee: Saud Al-Samhan (Kuwait)

26 November 2025 FIFA Arab Cup	Bahrain	1–0	Djibouti	Doha, Qatar
13:00 UTC+3	Al-Romaihi 36'			Stadium: Jassim bin Hamad Stadium

3 December 2025 FIFA Arab Cup	Iraq	2–1	Bahrain	Doha, Qatar
17:30 UTC+3	Lutfalla 10' (o.g.); M. Ali 25'	Report	Hashim 79'; Al-Khattal (red card) 90+3'	Stadium: Stadium 974; Attendance: 9,358; Referee: Pierre Atcho (Gabon)

6 December 2025 FIFA Arab Cup	Bahrain	1–5	Algeria	Al Rayyan, Qatar
16:30 UTC+3	Abduljabbar 27'	Report	Berkane 24', 48'; Boulbina 30', 80'; Benzia 45+7' (pen.)	Stadium: Khalifa International Stadium; Attendance: 20,260; Referee: Campbell-Kirk Kawana-Waugh (New Zealand Football

9 December 2025 FIFA Arab Cup	Bahrain	3–1	Sudan	Al Rayyan, Qatar
20:00 UTC+3	Abduljabbar 37'; Al-Romaihi 79' (pen.); Al-Humaidan 89'	Report	M. Ahmed (yellow card) 21' (red card) 58'; Muzamel 72'	Stadium: Education City Stadium; Attendance: 21,386; Referee: Juan Gabriel Benítez (Paraguay)

=== 2026 ===
5 June Friendly	Georgia	2–0	Bahrain	Tbilisi, Georgia
21:00 UTC+3	Lochoshvili 52'; Kvaratskhelia 77' (pen.)	Report		Stadium: Mikheil Meskhi Stadium; Attendance: 10,997; Referee: Duncan Nicolson (Scotland)

24 September 2026 Gulf Cup GS	Qatar	v	Bahrain	Jeddah, Saudi Arabia
21:00 UTC+3				Stadium: Prince Abdullah Al-Faisal Sports City Stadium

27 September 2026 Gulf Cup GS	Bahrain	v	United Arab Emirates	Jeddah, Saudi Arabia
--:-- UTC+3				Stadium: Prince Abdullah Al-Faisal Sports City Stadium

30 September 2026 Gulf Cup GS	Bahrain	v	Yemen	Jeddah, Saudi Arabia
--:-- UTC+3				Stadium: Prince Abdullah Al-Faisal Sports City Stadium

November 2026 WAFF Championship	Bahrain	v	Oman
--:--

November 2026 WAFF Championship	Bahrain	v	Oman
--:--

== Head to head records ==
As of 5 June 2026 after the game against Georgia.

Head to head records
Opponent	P	W	D	L	GF	GA	GD	% Won	First meeting	Federation
Albania	2	2	0	0	6	0	+6	100%	2001	UEFA
Algeria	3	0	2	1	1	5	+5	0%	1988	CAF
Australia	1	1	1	5	4	11	–7	14.28%	2006	AFC
Azerbaijan	0	0	0	3	3	8	–5	0%	2008	UEFA
Bangladesh	2	2	0	0	4	0	+4	100%	1979	AFC
Belarus	1	0	0	1	0	1	–1	0%	2022	UEFA
Bosnia and Herzegovina	1	0	0	1	0	1	–1	0%	2001	UEFA
Brazil	1	0	0	1	0	2	–2	0%	1979	CONMEBOL
Brunei	1	1	0	0	7	0	+7	100%	1981	AFC
Burkina Faso	2	2	0	0	5	2	+3	100%	1998	CONCACAF
Burundi	1	1	0	0	1	0	+1	100%	2022	CAF
Cambodia	2	2	0	0	9	0	+9	100%	2019	AFC
Canada	1	0	1	0	2	2	0	0%	2022	CONCACAF
Cape Verde	1	0	0	1	1	2	–1	0%	2022	CAF
Chad	1	0	1	0	1	1	0	0%	1997	CAF
Chile	1	0	0	1	0	2	–2	0%	2001	CONMEBOL
China	10	0	5	5	9	17	–8	0%	1981	AFC
Chinese Taipei	2	1	0	1	6	2	+4	50.00%	2017	AFC
Colombia	1	0	0	1	0	6	–6	0%	2015	CONMEBOL
Congo	1	1	0	0	3	1	+2	100%	2009	CAF
Curaçao	1	1	0	0	4	0	+4	100%	2021	CONCACAF
Denmark	3	1	0	2	3	7	–4	33.33%	1986	UEFA
Djibouti	1	1	0	0	1	0	+1	100%	2025	CAF
DR Congo	1	1	0	0	1	0	+1	100%	2022	CAF
Egypt	1	0	0	1	0	1	–1	0%	2003	CAF
England	1	0	0	1	0	4	–4	0%	1968	UEFA
Finland	5	0	1	4	1	9	–8	0%	1979	UEFA
Georgia	1	0	0	1	0	2	–2	0%	2026	UEFA
Haiti	1	1	0	0	6	1	+5	100%	2021	CONCACAF
Hong Kong	7	5	1	1	17	3	+14	71.42%	1993	AFC
Iceland	2	1	0	1	2	3	–1	50.00%	1986	UEFA
India	7	6	1	0	16	4	+11	85.71%	1982	AFC
Indonesia	9	3	3	3	21	10	+11	33.33%	1980	AFC
Iran	19	5	5	9	13	35	–22	26.31%	1974	AFC
Iraq	34	6	14	14	31	54	+1	17.64%	1966	AFC
Japan	15	2	1	12	11	33	–9	13.33%	1978	AFC
Jordan	31	11	6	14	26	35	–1	35.48%	1966	AFC
Kazakhstan	2	0	0	2	0	3	–3	0%	2000	AFC
Kenya	2	2	0	0	4	2	+2	100%	2003	CAF
North Korea	7	2	1	4	10	10	0	28.57%	2005	AFC
South Korea	25	3	5	17	20	58	–30	12.00%	1977	AFC
Kuwait	46	15	11	19	42	59	+1	50.00%	1966	AFC
Kyrgyzstan	7	6	1	0	16	4	+12	85.71%	2001	AFC
Latvia	1	0	1	0	2	2	0	0%	2004	UEFA
Lebanon	15	7	6	2	23	18	+5	46.67%	1966	AFC
Libya	6	2	1	3	9	12	–3	33.33%	1996	CAF
Malaysia	13	8	3	2	25	14	+11	61.53%	1977	AFC
Maldives	2	2	0	0	5	1	+4	100%	2000	AFC
Mauritania	1	1	0	0	2	0	+2	100%	1985	CAF
Morocco	3	0	0	3	0	6	–6	0%	1974	CAF
Myanmar	4	4	0	0	13	2	+11	100%	2003	AFC
Nepal	2	2	0	0	8	0	+8	100%	2024	AFC
Netherlands	1	0	0	1	1	8	–7	0%	1982	UEFA
New Zealand	5	0	1	4	1	6	–5	0%	1979	OFC
North Macedonia	1	0	1	0	1	1	0	0%	2002	UEFA
Norway	1	0	0	1	0	1	–1	0%	2005	UEFA
Oman	41	13	17	11	39	33	+6	31.70%	1974	AFC
Pakistan	1	0	0	1	1	5	–4	0%	1975	AFC
Palestine	9	4	1	4	12	8	+4	44.44%	2002	AFC
Panama	2	1	0	1	2	5	–3	50.00%	2005	CONMEBOL
Paraguay	1	0	0	1	1	2	–1	0%	1986	CONMEBOL
Philippines	7	4	2	1	10	5	+5	57.14%	2012	AFC
Qatar	41	10	22	9	32	36	–4	24.39%	1970	AFC
Saudi Arabia	40	8	12	20	29	59	–30	20.00%	1970	AFC
Serbia	1	0	0	1	1	5	–4	0%	2022	UEFA
Singapore	10	8	1	1	18	5	+13	80.00%	1981	AFC
Slovakia	1	1	0	0	2	0	+2	100%	2001	UEFA
Sri Lanka	1	1	0	0	1	0	+1	100%	1979	UEFA
Somalia	2	0	0	2	1	3	–2	0%	2025	CAF
Sudan	4	3	0	1	7	4	+3	75.00%	1979	AFC
Sweden	1	0	0	1	0	2	–2	0%	2012	UEFA
Syria	23	6	7	10	24	25	–1	26.08%	1979	AFC
Tajikistan	5	3	2	0	11	1	+10	60.00%	2004	AFC
Thailand	11	3	6	2	14	12	+2	27.27%	1980	AFC
Togo	1	1	0	0	5	1	+4	100%	2009	CAF
Trinidad and Tobago	2	0	1	1	1	2	–1	0%	2005	CONCACAF
Tunisia	2	1	0	1	1	3	–2	50.00%	1981	CAF
Turkmenistan	6	4	2	0	15	4	+11	66.67%	1994	AFC
Uganda	2	1	1	0	3	1	+2	50.00%	2010	CAF
Ukraine	1	0	1	0	1	1	0	0%	2021	UEFA
United Arab Emirates	33	11	6	16	43	56	–13	33.33%	1972	AFC
Uzbekistan	13	4	4	5	10	17	–7	30.76%	1972	AFC
Vietnam	1	0	0	1	3	5	0	0%	2007	AFC
Yemen	18	13	2	3	36	10	+26	72.22%	1994	AFC
Zimbabwe	1	1	0	0	5	2	+3	100%	2009	CAF
Total	626	222	164	240	771	799	–28	35.46%	1966	FIFA
