= Jaber Al-Mubarak Al-Hamad Stadium =

Stadium in Kuwait

Coordinates: 29°19′17″N 47°49′32″E

Jaber Al Mubarak Stadium
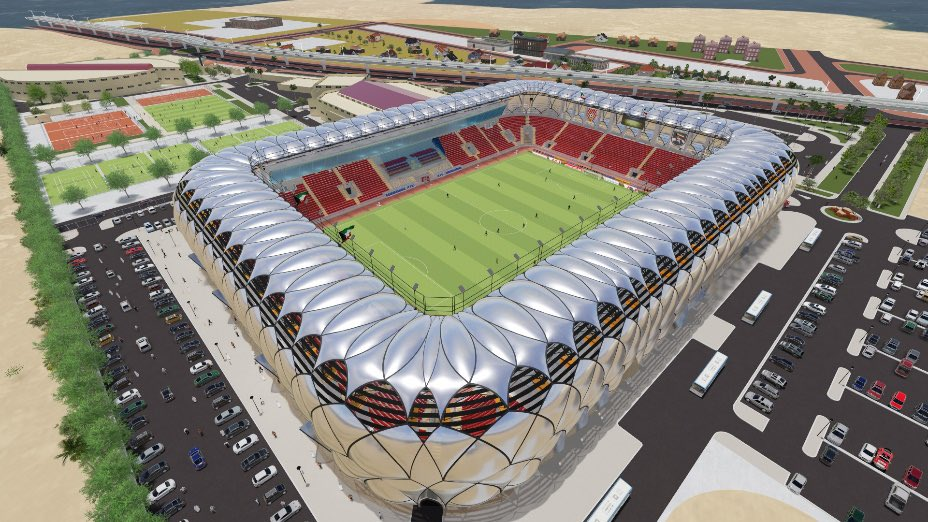
- Illustration
- Interactive map of Jaber Al Mubarak Stadium
- Former names: Sulaibikhat Stadium (2019–2024)
- Address: Sulaibikhat, Kuwait City; Kuwait
- Capacity: 15,000
- Record attendance: 10,500 (Saudi Arabia vs Oman, 31 December 2024) 26th Gulf Cup

Construction
- Built: 2019–2024
- Opened: 11 December 2024
- Architect: Dar Al-Dabbous Consultant office

Tenants
- Sulaibikhat SC; Kuwait SC (2024–); Al-Arabi (selected matches)

Jaber Al-Mubarak Al-Hamad Stadium (Arabic: استاد جابر المبارك الصباح), formerly known as Sulaibikhat Stadium, is a football stadium in Sulaibikhat, Kuwait. It is the home stadium of Sulaibikhat SC. It was built on an area of 102 thousand square meters, and can accommodate 15,000 spectators. It is a part of a large sport venue renovation project to have better sports infrastructure in Kuwait. It was named after Jaber Al-Mubarak Al-Hamad Al-Sabah, the 7th prime minister of Kuwait.

== History ==
The stadium underwent heavy renovations starting in 2019. It was opened on 11 December 2024. The stadium has in its mezzanine offices for stadium management and a venue that fits around 100 people for conferences and media personnel. The first floor (2nd in the American system) is dedicated to VIP attendees, whereas the second floor contains the rooms of the commentators, 2 analysis studios, and 14 private rooms that offer a view of the match, each fitting about 8 to 10 spectators.

It is also the first stadium in Kuwait that only has a football pitch without any race tracks. It's also the first stadium to be designed to be similar to European stadiums.

== Features ==
The stadium includes several floors, the ground floor of which was allocated to rooms for players, referees, and administrators, two sports halls, a warm-up room, in addition to television and radio broadcasting rooms. The mezzanine was allocated for media conferences, a hall for media professionals that can accommodate 100 media professionals, and administrative offices. The first floor contains a spacious hall for important figures (VIP) that includes 98 seats, and the second floor contains special platforms for viewers with a distinctive view of the stadium with 14 rooms, including 200 seats, in addition to 2 analytical studios, and rooms for commentators.

Its floor was made of hybrid grass, which is a mixture of artificial and natural grass together. The stadium was built with a concrete structure and a metal structure, with an external cladding material (ATFE), which gives an aesthetic look to the building, is resistant to natural factors, and allows lighting at the same time. The materials used in most of them are environmentally friendly. There are 28 gates in the stadium, which operate with a security camera system, including a gate that operates with an electronic reservation system, another for medical emergencies, and a third for maintenance and services, in addition to external parking spaces for spectators’ vehicles.

== Milestone matches ==
=== Opening friendly match ===
15 December 2024	(Kuwait) Sulaibikhat SC	2–2	Kuwait SC
17:15 UTC+3	Amri 34' 75' (pen.)		Al-Enezi 42' 89'	Attendance: 5,430; Referee: Khalid Al-Turais (Saudi Arabia)

=== 26th Arabian Gulf Cup ===
21 December 2024	United Arab Emirates	1–1	Qatar
22:30 UTC+3	Al-Ghassani 45+1'	Report	Afif 17' (pen.)	Attendance: 5,007; Referee: István Kovács (Romania)

22 December 2024	Iraq	1–0	Yemen
17:25 UTC+3	Hussein 64'	Report		Attendance: 7,203; Referee: Abdulrahman Al-Jassim (Qatar)

24 December 2024	Oman	2–1	Qatar
17:25 UTC+3	Al-Sabhi 20' (pen.), 52'	Report	Ali 2'	Attendance: 4,552; Referee: Mohanad Qasim Sarray (Iraq)

25 December 2024	Saudi Arabia	3–2	Yemen
17:25 UTC+3	Kanno 30'; Al-Juwayr 57' (pen.); Al-Hamdan 90+3'	Report	Al-Zubaidi 8'; Sabarah 27'	Attendance: 9,200; Referee: Qasim Al-Hatmi (Oman)

27 December 2024	United Arab Emirates	1–1	Oman
17:30 UTC+3	Al-Ghassani 20'	Report	Al-Mushaifri 79'	Attendance: 7,813; Referee: Ammar Mahfoodh (Bahrain)

28 December 2024	Bahrain	1–2	Yemen
17:30 UTC+3	Al-Romaihi 62'	Report	Al-Khatal 41' (o.g.); Al-Zubaidi 88'	Attendance: 5,394; Referee: Omar Al-Ali (United Arab Emirates)

==== Semi-finals ====
31 December 2024	Saudi Arabia	1–2	Oman
17:30 UTC+3	Kanno 87'	Report	A. Al-Alawi 74'; Al-Busaidi 85'	Attendance: 10,500; Referee: Halil Umut Meler (Turkey)
