= Sayed Baqer =

Bahraini footballer

Personal information
- Full name: Sayed Mahdi Baqer Jaafar Mahdi Naser
- Date of birth: 14 April 1994 (age 32)
- Place of birth: Manama, Bahrain
- Height: 1.85 m (6 ft 1 in)
- Position: Defender

Team information
- Current team: Riffa
- Number: 4

Senior career*
Years	Team	Apps	(Gls)
2015–2017	Al-Ahli		
2017–2018	Al-Najma		
2018–2019	Al-Nasr		
2019–	Riffa		

International career^{‡}
2015	Bahrain U23	3	(0)
2016–	Bahrain	21	(0)
Medal record
Men's football
Representing Bahrain
Gulf Cup
Winner	2024 Kuwait
- * Club domestic league appearances and goals as of 13:44, 5 January 2019 (UTC) ‡ National team caps and goals as of 13:44, 28 May 2021 (UTC)

Sayed Mahdi Baqer Jaafar Mahdi Naser (Arabic: سَيِّد مَهْدِيّ بَاقِر جَعْفَر مَهْدِيّ نَاصِر; born 14 April 1994) is a Bahraini footballer who plays as a defender for Riffa and the Bahrain national team.

== International career ==
Baqer made his senior international debut on 7 October 2016 in a 3–1 friendly victory over Philippines. Baqer was included in Bahrain's squad for the 2019 AFC Asian Cup in the United Arab Emirates.

On 14 November 2019, Baqer made a "slit eye" gesture towards the Hong Kong fans in the end of the 2022 FIFA World Cup qualifying match between Hong Kong and Bahrain. On 19 December 2019, FIFA banned Baqer for 10 matches and fined him CHF 30,000 as a punishment for his "discriminatory behaviour".

== Career statistics ==
=== International ===
As of 28 May 2021

Bahrain
Year	Apps	Goals
2016	1	0
2017	3	0
2018	5	0
2019	9	0
2020	1	0
2021	2	0
Total	21	0

No.	Date	Venue	Opponent	Score	Result	Competition
1.	21 March 2024	Bahrain National Stadium, Riffa, Bahrain	Nepal	2–0	5–0	2026 FIFA World Cup qualification
2.	26 March 2024	Bahrain National Stadium, Riffa, Bahrain	Nepal	1–0	3–0	2026 FIFA World Cup qualification
