= 2026 FIFA World Cup qualification – AFC second round =

International football competition

Tournament details
- Dates: 16 November 2023 – 11 June 2024
- Teams: 36 (from 1 confederation)

Tournament statistics
- Matches played: 107
- Goals scored: 331 (3.09 per match)
- Attendance: 2,092,613 (19,557 per match)
- Top scorer(s): (Qatar) Almoez Ali (South Korea) Son Heung-min (7 goals each)

The second round of 2026 FIFA World Cup AFC qualification, which also served as the second round of 2027 AFC Asian Cup qualification, began on 16 November 2023 and was completed on 11 June 2024.

== Format ==
A total of 36 teams were drawn into nine groups of four to play home-and-away round-robin matches. They included the 26 teams which received byes to this round, and the 10 winners from the first round.

The winners and runners-up of each group advanced to the third round and qualified for the 2027 AFC Asian Cup. The third and fourth place teams advanced to the third round of the 2027 Asian Cup qualification.

== Seeding ==
The draw for the second round was held on 27 July 2023 in Kuala Lumpur, Malaysia.

The seeding was based on the FIFA World Rankings of July 2023 (shown in parentheses below). The identities of the first round winners were not known at the time of the draw.

Note: Bolded teams qualified for the third round of World Cup qualifying.

Pot 1	Pot 2	Pot 3	Pot 4
1. **Japan** (20); 2. **Iran** (22); 3. **Australia** (27); 4. **South Korea** (28); 5. **Saudi Arabia** (54) (Note: Saudi Arabia had already qualified for the 2027 AFC Asian Cup as tournament hosts and competed to qualify for the 2026 FIFA World Cup.); 6. **Qatar** (59); 7. **Iraq** (70); 8. **United Arab Emirates** (72); 9. **Oman** (73)	10. **Uzbekistan** (74); 11. **China** (80); 12. **Jordan** (82); 13. **Bahrain** (86); 14. Syria (94); 15. Vietnam (95); 16. **Palestine** (96); 17. **Kyrgyzstan** (97); 18. India (99)	19. Lebanon (100); 20. Tajikistan (110); 21. Thailand (113); 22. **North Korea** (115); 23. Philippines (135); 24. Malaysia (136); 25. **Kuwait** (137); 26. Turkmenistan (138)	27. Hong Kong (149)^{†}; 28. **Indonesia** (150)^{†}; 29. Chinese Taipei (153)^{†}; 30. Yemen (156)^{†‡}; 31. Afghanistan (157)^{†}; 32. Singapore (158)^{†}; 33. Myanmar (160)^{†}; 34. Nepal (175)^{†}; 35. Bangladesh (189)^{†}; 36. Pakistan (201)^{†}

^{†} Teams whose identity was not known at the time of the draw.
^{‡} Team moved to Pot 3 after the other Pot 4 teams had been drawn into groups; subsequently drawn at random from Pot 3.

== Schedule ==
The match schedule was as follows.

Matchday	Date(s)
Matchday 1	16 November 2023
Matchday 2	21 November 2023
Matchday 3	21 March 2024
Matchday 4	26 March 2024
Matchday 5	6 June 2024
Matchday 6	11 June 2024

== Group A ==
Pos	Team	Pld	W	D	L	GF	GA	GD	Pts	Qualification	(Qatar)	(Kuwait)	(India)	(Afghanistan)
1	Qatar	6	5	1	0	18	3	+15	16	World Cup qualifying third round and Asian Cup	—	3–0	2–1	8–1
2	Kuwait	6	2	1	3	6	6	0	7	World Cup qualifying third round and Asian Cup	1–2	—	0–1	1–0
3	India	6	1	2	3	3	7	−4	5	Asian Cup qualifying third round	0–3	0–0	—	1–2
4	Afghanistan	6	1	2	3	3	14	−11	5	Asian Cup qualifying third round	0–0	0–4	0–0	—

Source: FIFA, AFC
Rules for classification: Tiebreakers
16 November 2023
18:45 UTC+3

Qatar	8–1	Afghanistan
Al-Haydos 11'; Ali 15', 26', 33' (pen.), 45+3' (pen.); Meshaal 18'; Alaaeldin 53' (pen.); Al-Abdullah 90+4'	Report (FIFA); Report (AFC)	Sharifi 13'

Khalifa International Stadium, Al Rayyan
Attendance: 19,374
Referee: Nasrullo Kabirov (Tajikistan)
16 November 2023
19:30 UTC+3

Kuwait	0–1	India
	Report (FIFA); Report (AFC)	Manvir 75'

Jaber Al-Ahmad International Stadium, Kuwait City
Attendance: 32,786
Referee: Shaun Evans (Australia)

21 November 2023
20:00 UTC+3

Afghanistan	0–4	Kuwait
	Report (FIFA); Report (AFC)	Al-Khaldi 18' (pen.), 80'; Daham 69'; Saleh 82'

Al-Ettifaq Club Stadium, Khobar (Saudi Arabia) (Note: Afghanistan played their home matches at a neutral venue due to the ongoing Afghan conflict.)
Attendance: 330
Referee: Ahmed Al-Ali (Jordan)
21 November 2023
19:00 UTC+5:30

India	0–3	Qatar
	Report (FIFA); Report (AFC)	Meshaal 4'; Ali 47'; Abdurisag 86'

Kalinga Stadium, Bhubaneswar
Attendance: 11,389
Referee: Sivakorn Pu-udom (Thailand)

21 March 2024
21:30 UTC+3

Qatar	3–0	Kuwait
Afif 47', 68'; Al-Rawi 51'	Report (FIFA); Report (AFC)

Jassim bin Hamad Stadium, Al Rayyan
Attendance: 9,826
Referee: Jumpei Iida (Japan)
21 March 2024
22:00 UTC+3

Afghanistan	0–0	India
	Report (FIFA); Report (AFC)

Damac Club Stadium, Khamis Mushait (Saudi Arabia)
Attendance: 3,900
Referee: Kim Hee-gon (South Korea)

26 March 2024
19:00 UTC+5:30

India	1–2	Afghanistan
Chhetri 38' (pen.)	Report (FIFA); Report (AFC)	Akbari 70'; Mukhammad 88' (pen.)

Indira Gandhi Athletic Stadium, Guwahati
Attendance: 8,932
Referee: Mohammed Al-Hoaish (Saudi Arabia)
26 March 2024
22:00 UTC+3

Kuwait	1–2	Qatar
Daham 79'	Report (FIFA); Report (AFC)	Ali 77', 80'

Ali Sabah Al-Salem Stadium, Farwaniya
Attendance: 8,460
Referee: Sadullo Gulmurodi (Tajikistan)

6 June 2024
19:00 UTC+3

Afghanistan	0–0	Qatar
	Report (FIFA); Report (AFC)

Prince Abdullah bin Jalawi Sport City, Hofuf (Saudi Arabia)
Attendance: 651
Referee: Sivakorn Pu-udom (Thailand)
6 June 2024
19:00 UTC+5:30

India	0–0	Kuwait
	Report (FIFA); Report (AFC)

Salt Lake Stadium, Kolkata
Attendance: 58,921
Referee: Fu Ming (China)

11 June 2024
18:45 UTC+3

Qatar	2–1	India
Aymen 73'; Al-Rawi 85'	Report (FIFA); Report (AFC)	Chhangte 37'

Jassim bin Hamad Stadium, Al Rayyan
Attendance: 2,816
Referee: Kim Woo-sung (South Korea)
11 June 2024
18:45 UTC+3

Kuwait	1–0	Afghanistan
Al Rashidi 81'	Report (FIFA); Report (AFC)

Sabah Al Salem Stadium, Kuwait City
Attendance: 11,680
Referee: Hiroyuki Kimura (Japan)

== Group B ==
Pos	Team	Pld	W	D	L	GF	GA	GD	Pts	Qualification	(Japan)	(North Korea)	(Syria)	(Myanmar)
1	Japan	6	6	0	0	24	0	+24	18	World Cup qualifying third round and Asian Cup	—	1–0	5–0	5–0
2	North Korea	6	3	0	3	11	7	+4	9	World Cup qualifying third round and Asian Cup	0–3 (Note: Japan were awarded a 3–0 victory by forfeit, after North Korea refused to host the match citing concerns about a disease spreading in Japan.)	—	1–0	4–1
3	Syria	6	2	1	3	9	12	−3	7	Asian Cup qualifying third round	0–5	1–0	—	7–0
4	Myanmar	6	0	1	5	3	28	−25	1	Asian Cup qualifying third round	0–5	1–6	1–1	—

Source: FIFA, AFC
Rules for classification: Tiebreakers
Notes:
16 November 2023
19:00 UTC+9

Japan	5–0	Myanmar
Ueda 11', 45+4', 50'; Kamada 28'; Dōan 86'	Report (FIFA); Report (AFC)

Suita City Football Stadium, Suita
Attendance: 34,484
Referee: Muhammad Taqi (Singapore)
16 November 2023 (Note: The hosting duties for the matches between North Korea and Syria were swapped on 2 November 2023.)
20:00 UTC+3

Syria	1–0	North Korea
Al Somah 37' (pen.)	Report (FIFA); Report (AFC)

Prince Abdullah Al-Faisal Sports City, Jeddah (Saudi Arabia) (Note: Syria played their home matches at a neutral venue due to the ongoing Syrian civil war.)
Attendance: 4,285
Referee: Alireza Faghani (Australia)

21 November 2023
16:00 UTC+6:30

Myanmar	1–6	North Korea
Win Naing Tun 77'	Report (FIFA); Report (AFC)	Jong Il-gwan 30', 54', 56'; Choe Ju-song 34' (pen.); Han Kwang-song 38'; Ri Hyong-jin 70'

Thuwunna Stadium, Yangon
Attendance: 9,500
Referee: Ilgiz Tantashev (Uzbekistan)
21 November 2023
17:45 UTC+3

Syria	0–5	Japan
	Report (FIFA); Report (AFC)	Kubo 32'; Ueda 37', 40'; Sugawara 47'; Hosoya 82'

Prince Abdullah Al-Faisal Sports City, Jeddah (Saudi Arabia)
Attendance: 6,130
Referee: Ma Ning (China)

21 March 2024
19:23 UTC+9

Japan	1–0	North Korea
Tanaka 2'	Report (FIFA); Report (AFC)

Japan National Stadium, Tokyo
Attendance: 59,354
Referee: Adel Al-Naqbi (United Arab Emirates)
21 March 2024
18:00 UTC+6:30

Myanmar	1–1	Syria
Soe Moe Kyaw 35'	Report (FIFA); Report (AFC)	Al Dali 71'

Thuwunna Stadium, Yangon
Attendance: 7,580
Referee: Hassan Akrami (Iran)

26 March 2024
22:00 UTC+3

Syria	7–0	Myanmar
Khribin 30', 54', 63' (pen.); Hesar 47'; Ajan 51', 68'; Al-Dali 80'	Report (FIFA); Report (AFC)

Prince Mohamed bin Fahd Stadium, Dammam (Saudi Arabia)
Attendance: 3,252
Referee: Pranjal Banerjee (India)
26 March 2024

North Korea	0–3 Awarded (Note: Japan were awarded a 3–0 victory by forfeit, after North Korea refused to host the match due to "a malignant infectious disease" spreading in Japan.)	Japan
	Report (FIFA); Report (AFC)

6 June 2024
18:40 UTC+6:30

Myanmar	0–5	Japan
	Report (FIFA); Report (AFC)	Nakamura 17', 90+3'; Dōan 34'; Ogawa 75', 83'

Thuwunna Stadium, Yangon
Attendance: 21,200
Referee: Majed Al-Shamrani (Saudi Arabia)
6 June 2024
20:00 UTC+7

North Korea	1–0	Syria
Jong Il-gwan 90+2'	Report (FIFA); Report (AFC)

New Laos National Stadium, Vientiane (Laos) (Note: Following the incident over North Korea's refusal to host home game against Japan, North Korea played their home matches in a neutral ground, per Syria's request.)
Attendance: 100
Referee: Salman Falahi (Qatar)

11 June 2024
19:14 UTC+9

Japan	5–0	Syria
Ueda 13'; Dōan 19'; Krouma 21' (o.g.); Soma 73' (pen.); Minamino 85'	Report (FIFA); Report (AFC)

Edion Peace Wing Hiroshima, Hiroshima
Attendance: 26,650
Referee: Ahmad Al-Ali (Kuwait)
11 June 2024
20:00 UTC+7

North Korea	4–1	Myanmar
Ri Il-song 12'; Ri Jo-guk 16', 43', 87' (pen.)	Report (FIFA); Report (AFC)	Wai Lin Aung 57'

New Laos National Stadium, Vientiane (Laos)
Attendance: 141
Referee: Shen Yinhao (China)

== Group C ==
Pos	Team	Pld	W	D	L	GF	GA	GD	Pts	Qualification	(South Korea)	(China)	(Thailand)	(Singapore)
1	South Korea	6	5	1	0	20	1	+19	16	World Cup qualifying third round and Asian Cup	—	1–0	1–1	5–0
2	China	6	2	2	2	9	9	0	8 (Note: Head-to-head points: China 4, Thailand 1.)	World Cup qualifying third round and Asian Cup	0–3	—	1–1	4–1
3	Thailand	6	2	2	2	9	9	0	8	Asian Cup qualifying third round	0–3	1–2	—	3–1
4	Singapore	6	0	1	5	5	24	−19	1	Asian Cup qualifying third round	0–7	2–2	1–3	—

Source: FIFA, AFC
Rules for classification: Tiebreakers
Notes:
16 November 2023
20:00 UTC+9

South Korea	5–0	Singapore
Cho Gue-sung 44'; Hwang Hee-chan 49'; Son Heung-min 63'; Hwang Ui-jo 68' (pen.); Lee Kang-in 85'	Report (FIFA); Report (AFC)

Seoul World Cup Stadium, Seoul
Attendance: 64,381
Referee: Bijan Heydari (Iran)
16 November 2023
19:30 UTC+7

Thailand	1–2	China
Sarach 23'	Report (FIFA); Report (AFC)	Wu Lei 29'; Wang Shangyuan 74'

Rajamangala Stadium, Bangkok
Attendance: 35,009
Referee: Salman Falahi (Qatar)

21 November 2023
20:00 UTC+8

Singapore	1–3	Thailand
Shawal 41'	Report (FIFA); Report (AFC)	Supachok 5'; Suphanat 66', 87'

National Stadium, Singapore
Attendance: 29,644
Referee: Ahmad Al-Ali (Kuwait)
21 November 2023
20:00 UTC+8

China	0–3	South Korea
	Report (FIFA); Report (AFC)	Son Heung-min 11' (pen.), 45'; Jung Seung-hyun 87'

Shenzhen Universiade Sports Centre, Shenzhen
Attendance: 39,969
Referee: Abdulrahman Al-Jassim (Qatar)

21 March 2024
20:00 UTC+9

South Korea	1–1	Thailand
Son Heung-min 42'	Report (FIFA); Report (AFC)	Suphanat 61'

Seoul World Cup Stadium, Seoul
Attendance: 64,912
Referee: Khalid Al-Turais (Saudi Arabia)
21 March 2024
20:30 UTC+8

Singapore	2–2	China
Faris 53'; Mahler 81'	Report (FIFA); Report (AFC)	Wu Lei 10', 45+2'

National Stadium, Singapore
Attendance: 28,414
Referee: Shaun Evans (Australia)

26 March 2024
20:00 UTC+8

China	4–1	Singapore
Wu Lei 21', 85'; Fernandinho 65' (pen.); Wei Shihao 90'	Report (FIFA); Report (AFC)	Faris 22'

Tianjin Olympic Centre, Tianjin
Attendance: 42,977
Referee: Omar Al-Ali (United Arab Emirates)
26 March 2024
19:30 UTC+7

Thailand	0–3	South Korea
	Report (FIFA); Report (AFC)	Lee Jae-sung 19'; Son Heung-min 54'; Park Jin-seob 82'

Rajamangala Stadium, Bangkok
Attendance: 45,458
Referee: Adham Makhadmeh (Jordan)

6 June 2024
20:00 UTC+8

Singapore	0–7	South Korea
	Report (FIFA); Report (AFC)	Lee Kang-in 9', 54'; Joo Min-kyu 20'; Son Heung-min 53', 56'; Bae Jun-ho 79'; Hwang Hee-chan 81'

National Stadium, Singapore
Attendance: 49,097
Referee: Sadullo Gulmurodi (Tajikistan)
6 June 2024
20:00 UTC+8

China	1–1	Thailand
Zhang Yuning 79'	Report (FIFA); Report (AFC)	Supachok 20'

Shenyang Olympic Sports Centre Stadium, Shenyang
Attendance: 46,979
Referee: Ilgiz Tantashev (Uzbekistan)

11 June 2024
20:00 UTC+9

South Korea	1–0	China
Lee Kang-in 61'	Report (FIFA); Report (AFC)

Seoul World Cup Stadium, Seoul
Attendance: 64,935
Referee: Mohammed Al-Hoaish (Saudi Arabia)
11 June 2024
19:30 UTC+7

Thailand	3–1	Singapore
Suphanat 37'; Poramet 79'; Jaroensak 86'	Report (FIFA); Report (AFC)	Ik. Fandi 57'

Rajamangala Stadium, Bangkok
Attendance: 39,404
Referee: Mohanad Qasim Sarray (Iraq)

== Group D ==
Pos	Team	Pld	W	D	L	GF	GA	GD	Pts	Qualification	(Oman)	(Kyrgyzstan)	(Malaysia)	(Chinese Taipei)
1	Oman	6	4	1	1	11	2	+9	13	World Cup qualifying third round and Asian Cup	—	1–1	2–0	3–0
2	Kyrgyzstan	6	3	2	1	13	7	+6	11	World Cup qualifying third round and Asian Cup	1–0	—	1–1	5–1
3	Malaysia	6	3	1	2	9	9	0	10	Asian Cup qualifying third round	0–2	4–3	—	3–1
4	Chinese Taipei	6	0	0	6	2	17	−15	0	Asian Cup qualifying third round	0–3	0–2	0–1	—

Source: FIFA, AFC
Rules for classification: Tiebreakers
16 November 2023
19:00 UTC+4

Oman	3–0	Chinese Taipei
Al-Malki 17'; Pan Wen-chieh 41' (o.g.); Saleh 90+2'	Report (FIFA); Report (AFC)

Sultan Qaboos Sports Complex, Muscat
Attendance: 4,155
Referee: Sadullo Gulmurodi (Tajikistan)
16 November 2023
21:00 UTC+8

Malaysia	4–3	Kyrgyzstan
Cools 7', 77'; Brauzman 72' (o.g.); Faisal 90+3'	Report (FIFA); Report (AFC)	Zhyrgalbek uulu 42'; Batyrkanov 44'; Ka. Merk 57'

Bukit Jalil National Stadium, Kuala Lumpur
Attendance: 17,142
Referee: Ammar Mahfoodh (Bahrain)

21 November 2023
19:00 UTC+8

Chinese Taipei	0–1	Malaysia
	Report (FIFA); Report (AFC)	Lok 72'

Taipei Municipal Stadium, Taipei
Attendance: 9,521
Referee: Majed Al-Shamrani (Saudi Arabia)
21 November 2023
20:00 UTC+6

Kyrgyzstan	1–0	Oman
Abdurakhmanov 49'	Report (FIFA); Report (AFC)

Dolen Omurzakov Stadium, Bishkek
Attendance: 10,783
Referee: Mooud Bonyadifard (Iran)

21 March 2024
16:00 UTC+8

Chinese Taipei	0–2	Kyrgyzstan
	Report (FIFA); Report (AFC)	Kichin 54' (pen.); Ka. Merk 80'

Kaohsiung Nanzih Football Stadium, Kaohsiung
Attendance: 1,028
Referee: Yahya Al-Mulla (United Arab Emirates)
21 March 2024
22:00 UTC+4

Oman	2–0	Malaysia
Al-Sabhi 58'; Al-Ghassani 88'	Report (FIFA); Report (AFC)

Sultan Qaboos Sports Complex, Muscat
Attendance: 21,836
Referee: Fu Ming (China)

26 March 2024
20:00 UTC+6

Kyrgyzstan	5–1	Chinese Taipei
Kojo 17', 38', 45'; Brauzman 79'; Ki. Merk 90+5'	Report (FIFA); Report (AFC)	Wu Yen-shu 87' (pen.)

Dolen Omurzakov Stadium, Bishkek
Attendance: 13,657
Referee: Ammar Mahfoodh (Bahrain)
26 March 2024
22:00 UTC+8

Malaysia	0–2	Oman
	Report (FIFA); Report (AFC)	Al-Malki 45+4' (pen.); Al-Ghafri 90+4'

Bukit Jalil National Stadium, Kuala Lumpur
Attendance: 26,499
Referee: Ko Hyung-jin (South Korea)

6 June 2024
19:00 UTC+8

Chinese Taipei	0–3	Oman
	Report (FIFA); Report (AFC)	Al-Mushaifri 31', 55', 75'

Taipei Municipal Stadium, Taipei
Attendance: 5,700
Referee: Zaid Thamer (Iraq)
6 June 2024
21:00 UTC+6

Kyrgyzstan	1–1	Malaysia
Alykulov 24'	Report (FIFA); Report (AFC)	Abdurakhmanov 38' (o.g.)

Dolen Omurzakov Stadium, Bishkek
Attendance: 14,135
Referee: Adham Makhadmeh (Jordan)

11 June 2024
20:00 UTC+4

Oman	1–1	Kyrgyzstan
Shukurov 57' (o.g.)	Report (FIFA); Report (AFC)	Zarypbekov 19'

Sultan Qaboos Sports Complex, Muscat
Attendance: 13,754
Referee: Alireza Faghani (Australia)
11 June 2024
21:00 UTC+8

Malaysia	3–1	Chinese Taipei
Safawi 53'; Paulo Josué 69'; Adib 90+6'	Report (FIFA); Report (AFC)	Yu Yao-hsing 20'

Bukit Jalil National Stadium, Kuala Lumpur
Attendance: 14,731
Referee: Abdullah Jamali (Kuwait)

== Group E ==
Pos	Team	Pld	W	D	L	GF	GA	GD	Pts	Qualification	(Iran)	(Uzbekistan)	(Turkmenistan)	(Hong Kong)
1	Iran	6	4	2	0	16	4	+12	14	World Cup qualifying third round and Asian Cup	—	0–0	5–0	4–0
2	Uzbekistan	6	4	2	0	13	4	+9	14	World Cup qualifying third round and Asian Cup	2–2	—	3–1	3–0
3	Turkmenistan	6	0	2	4	4	14	−10	2	Asian Cup qualifying third round	0–1	1–3	—	0–0
4	Hong Kong	6	0	2	4	4	15	−11	2	Asian Cup qualifying third round	2–4	0–2	2–2	—

Source: FIFA, AFC
Rules for classification: Tiebreakers
16 November 2023
18:00 UTC+3:30

Iran	4–0	Hong Kong
Azmoun 12', 15'; Taremi 87'; Rezaeian 90+2'	Report (FIFA); Report (AFC)

Azadi Stadium, Tehran
Attendance: 6,191
Referee: Nazmi Nasaruddin (Malaysia)
16 November 2023
19:00 UTC+5

Turkmenistan	1–3	Uzbekistan
Durdyýew 44'	Report (FIFA); Report (AFC)	Shukurov 57', 77'; Shomurodov 90+1'

Ashgabat Stadium, Ashgabat
Attendance: 19,500
Referee: Hiroyuki Kimura (Japan)

21 November 2023
20:00 UTC+8

Hong Kong	2–2	Turkmenistan
Wong Wai 12'; Camargo 65'	Report (FIFA); Report (AFC)	Mingazow 4', 36'

Hong Kong Stadium, Hong Kong
Attendance: 6,601
Referee: Adel Al-Naqbi (United Arab Emirates)
21 November 2023
18:00 UTC+5

Uzbekistan	2–2	Iran
Urunov 52'; Sergeev 83'	Report (FIFA); Report (AFC)	Rezaeian 14'; Taremi 38'

Milliy Stadium, Tashkent
Attendance: 32,551
Referee: Mohammed Abdulla Hassan Mohamed (United Arab Emirates)

21 March 2024
20:00 UTC+8

Hong Kong	0–2	Uzbekistan
	Report (FIFA); Report (AFC)	Shomurodov 49'; Ashurmatov 66'

Mong Kok Stadium, Hong Kong
Attendance: 6,263
Referee: Kim Woo-sung (South Korea)
21 March 2024
19:30 UTC+3:30

Iran	5–0	Turkmenistan
Kanaani 10', 48'; Azmoun 13'; Mohebi 56'; Noorafkan 90+2'	Report (FIFA); Report (AFC)

Azadi Stadium, Tehran
Attendance: 23,109
Referee: Yusuke Araki (Japan)

26 March 2024
19:30 UTC+5

Uzbekistan	3–0	Hong Kong
Shomurodov 20'; Erkinov 63'; Urunov 70'	Report (FIFA); Report (AFC)

Milliy Stadium, Tashkent
Attendance: 29,584
Referee: Ahmed Al-Ali (Jordan)
26 March 2024
20:00 UTC+5

Turkmenistan	0–1	Iran
	Report (FIFA); Report (AFC)	Ghayedi 45+5'

Ashgabat Stadium, Ashgabat
Attendance: 10,230
Referee: Sivakorn Pu-udom (Thailand)

6 June 2024
20:00 UTC+8

Hong Kong	2–4	Iran
Ma Hei Wai 14'; Pinto 59'	Report (FIFA); Report (AFC)	Taremi 12' (pen.), 34' (pen.), 56'; Azmoun 65'

Hong Kong Stadium, Hong Kong
Attendance: 9,992
Referee: Qasim Al-Hatmi (Oman)
6 June 2024
19:30 UTC+5

Uzbekistan	3–1	Turkmenistan
Aliqulov 17'; Urunov 29'; Nasrullaev 70'	Report (FIFA); Report (AFC)	Tirkişow 25'

Milliy Stadium, Tashkent
Attendance: 27,306
Referee: Yusuke Araki (Japan)

11 June 2024
20:00 UTC+5

Turkmenistan	0–0	Hong Kong
	Report (FIFA); Report (AFC)

Ashgabat Stadium, Ashgabat
Attendance: 10,324
Referee: Hussein Abo Yehia (Lebanon)
11 June 2024
20:30 UTC+3:30

Iran	0–0	Uzbekistan
	Report (FIFA); Report (AFC)

Azadi Stadium, Tehran
Attendance: 15,468
Referee: Kim Jong-hyeok (South Korea)

== Group F ==
Pos	Team	Pld	W	D	L	GF	GA	GD	Pts	Qualification	(Iraq)	(Indonesia)	(Vietnam)	(Philippines)
1	Iraq	6	6	0	0	17	2	+15	18	World Cup qualifying third round and Asian Cup	—	5–1	3–1	1–0
2	Indonesia	6	3	1	2	8	8	0	10	World Cup qualifying third round and Asian Cup	0–2	—	1–0	2–0
3	Vietnam	6	2	0	4	6	10	−4	6	Asian Cup qualifying third round	0–1	0–3	—	3–2
4	Philippines	6	0	1	5	3	14	−11	1	Asian Cup qualifying third round	0–5	1–1	0–2	—

Source: FIFA, AFC
Rules for classification: Tiebreakers
16 November 2023
17:45 UTC+3

Iraq	5–1	Indonesia
Resan 20'; Amat 35' (o.g.); Rashid 60'; Amyn 81'; Al-Hamadi 88'	Report (FIFA); Report (AFC)	Pattynama 45+3'

Basra International Stadium, Basra
Attendance: 64,447
Referee: Ahmed Eisa (United Arab Emirates)
16 November 2023
19:00 UTC+8

Philippines	0–2	Vietnam
	Report (FIFA); Report (AFC)	Nguyễn Văn Toàn 16'; Nguyễn Đình Bắc 90+4'

Rizal Memorial Stadium, Manila
Attendance: 10,378
Referee: Rustam Lutfullin (Uzbekistan)

21 November 2023
19:00 UTC+8

Philippines	1–1	Indonesia
Reichelt 23'	Report (FIFA); Report (AFC)	Saddil 70'

Rizal Memorial Stadium, Manila (Note: Indonesia and Philippines swapped their fixtures on 31 October 2023, due to Indonesia hosting the 2023 FIFA U-17 World Cup.)
Attendance: 9,880
Referee: Kim Jong-hyeok (South Korea)
21 November 2023
19:00 UTC+7

Vietnam	0–1	Iraq
	Report (FIFA); Report (AFC)	M. Ali 90+7'

Mỹ Đình National Stadium, Hanoi
Attendance: 20,568
Referee: Abdulla Al-Marri (Qatar)

21 March 2024
22:00 UTC+3

Iraq	1–0	Philippines
M. Ali 84'	Report (FIFA); Report (AFC)

Basra International Stadium, Basra
Attendance: 63,750
Referee: Abdullah Jamali (Kuwait)
21 March 2024
20:30 UTC+7

Indonesia	1–0	Vietnam
Egy 52'	Report (FIFA); Report (AFC)

Gelora Bung Karno Stadium, Jakarta
Attendance: 57,696
Referee: Salman Falahi (Qatar)

26 March 2024
19:00 UTC+7

Vietnam	0–3	Indonesia
	Report (FIFA); Report (AFC)	Idzes 9'; Oratmangoen 23'; Sananta 90+8'

Mỹ Đình National Stadium, Hanoi
Attendance: 27,832
Referee: Alireza Faghani (Australia)
26 March 2024
19:00 UTC+8

Philippines	0–5	Iraq
	Report (FIFA); Report (AFC)	Hussein 14' (pen.), 36'; Al-Ammari 30'; Iqbal 62'; Tahseen 77'

Rizal Memorial Stadium, Manila
Attendance: 10,014
Referee: Nazmi Nasaruddin (Malaysia)

6 June 2024
16:00 UTC+7

Indonesia	0–2	Iraq
	Report (FIFA); Report (AFC)	Hussein 54' (pen.); Jasim 88'

Gelora Bung Karno Stadium, Jakarta
Attendance: 60,245
Referee: Shaun Evans (Australia)
6 June 2024
19:00 UTC+7

Vietnam	3–2	Philippines
Nguyễn Tiến Linh 65', 76'; Phạm Tuấn Hải 90+5'	Report (FIFA); Report (AFC)	Reichelt 62'; Ingreso 89'

Mỹ Đình National Stadium, Hanoi
Attendance: 11,568
Referee: Hanna Hattab (Syria)

11 June 2024
21:00 UTC+3

Iraq	3–1	Vietnam
H. Ali 12'; Jasim 71'; Hussein 90+2'	Report (FIFA); Report (AFC)	Phạm Tuấn Hải 84'

Basra International Stadium, Basra
Attendance: 42,791
Referee: Omar Al-Ali (United Arab Emirates)
11 June 2024
19:30 UTC+7

Indonesia	2–0	Philippines
Haye 32'; Ridho 56'	Report (FIFA); Report (AFC)

Gelora Bung Karno Stadium, Jakarta
Attendance: 64,842
Referee: Rustam Lutfullin (Uzbekistan)

== Group G ==
Pos	Team	Pld	W	D	L	GF	GA	GD	Pts	Qualification	(Jordan)	(Saudi Arabia)	(Tajikistan)	(Pakistan)
1	Jordan	6	4	1	1	16	4	+12	13	World Cup qualifying third round and Asian Cup	—	0–2	3–0	7–0
2	Saudi Arabia (Note: Saudi Arabia already qualified for the Asian Cup as the host nation and only competed to qualify for the World Cup.)	6	4	1	1	12	3	+9	13	World Cup qualifying third round	1–2	—	1–0	4–0
3	Tajikistan	6	2	2	2	11	7	+4	8	Asian Cup qualifying third round	1–1	1–1	—	3–0
4	Pakistan	6	0	0	6	1	26	−25	0	Asian Cup qualifying third round	0–3	0–3	1–6	—

Source: FIFA, AFC
Rules for classification: Tiebreakers
Notes:
16 November 2023
19:30 UTC+3

Saudi Arabia	4–0	Pakistan
Al-Shehri 6', 48' (pen.); Ghareeb 90+1'; Radif 90+6'	Report (FIFA); Report (AFC)

Al-Fateh SC Stadium, Al-Mubarraz
Attendance: 11,150
Referee: Hanna Hattab (Syria)
16 November 2023
18:00 UTC+5

Tajikistan	1–1	Jordan
Samiev 89'	Report (FIFA); Report (AFC)	Al-Naimat 90+3'

Pamir Stadium, Dushanbe
Attendance: 13,650
Referee: Ali Sabah (Iraq)

21 November 2023
14:00 UTC+5

Pakistan	1–6	Tajikistan
Nabi 21'	Report (FIFA); Report (AFC)	Kamolov 9', 66'; Soirov 13'; Umarbayev 26'; Panjshanbe 45'; Samiev 90+1'

Jinnah Sports Stadium, Islamabad
Attendance: 18,316
Referee: Yusuke Araki (Japan)
21 November 2023
19:00 UTC+3

Jordan	0–2	Saudi Arabia
	Report (FIFA); Report (AFC)	Al-Shehri 8', 30'

Amman International Stadium, Amman
Attendance: 13,845
Referee: Ahmed Al-Kaf (Oman)

21 March 2024
14:00 UTC+5

Pakistan	0–3	Jordan
	Report (FIFA); Report (AFC)	Al-Taamari 2', 86'; Olwan 9' (pen.)

Jinnah Sports Stadium, Islamabad
Attendance: 9,625
Referee: Rustam Lutfullin (Uzbekistan)
21 March 2024
22:00 UTC+3

Saudi Arabia	1–0	Tajikistan
Al-Dawsari 23'	Report (FIFA); Report (AFC)

King Saud University Stadium, Riyadh
Attendance: 18,756
Referee: Muhammad Taqi (Singapore)

26 March 2024
21:00 UTC+3

Jordan	7–0	Pakistan
Al-Taamari 15', 62', 79'; Al-Naimat 28' (pen.); Al-Rosan 52'; Olwan 75'; Abu Zraiq 83'	Report (FIFA); Report (AFC)

Amman International Stadium, Amman
Attendance: 14,695
Referee: Nivon Robesh Gamini (Sri Lanka)
26 March 2024
20:00 UTC+5

Tajikistan	1–1	Saudi Arabia
Soirov 80'	Report (FIFA); Report (AFC)	Al-Buraikan 46'

Pamir Stadium, Dushanbe
Attendance: 13,300
Referee: Kim Jong-hyeok (South Korea)

6 June 2024
20:30 UTC+5

Pakistan	0–3	Saudi Arabia
	Report (FIFA); Report (AFC)	Al-Buraikan 26', 41'; Al-Juwayr 59'

Jinnah Sports Stadium, Islamabad
Attendance: 20,124
Referee: Ammar Mahfoodh (Bahrain)
6 June 2024
20:30 UTC+3

Jordan	3–0	Tajikistan
Olwan 51'; Al-Naimat 68'; Sadeh 90+4'	Report (FIFA); Report (AFC)

Amman International Stadium, Amman
Attendance: 14,795
Referee: Ahmed Al-Kaf (Oman)

11 June 2024
20:00 UTC+5

Tajikistan	3–0	Pakistan
Mabatshoev 35'; Safarov 65'; Hanonov 70'	Report (FIFA); Report (AFC)

Pamir Stadium, Dushanbe
Attendance: 7,800
Referee: Mooud Bonyadifard (Iran)
11 June 2024
21:00 UTC+3

Saudi Arabia	1–2	Jordan
Lajami 16'	Report (FIFA); Report (AFC)	Olwan 27'; Al-Rawabdeh 45+2'

KSU Stadium, Riyadh
Attendance: 17,871
Referee: Adel Al-Naqbi (United Arab Emirates)

== Group H ==
Pos	Team	Pld	W	D	L	GF	GA	GD	Pts	Qualification	(United Arab Emirates)	(Bahrain)	(Yemen)	(Nepal)
1	United Arab Emirates	6	5	1	0	16	2	+14	16	World Cup qualifying third round and Asian Cup	—	1–1	2–1	4–0
2	Bahrain	6	3	2	1	11	3	+8	11	World Cup qualifying third round and Asian Cup	0–2	—	0–0	3–0
3	Yemen	6	1	2	3	5	9	−4	5	Asian Cup qualifying third round	0–3	0–2	—	2–2
4	Nepal	6	0	1	5	2	20	−18	1	Asian Cup qualifying third round	0–4	0–5	0–2	—

Source: FIFA, AFC
Rules for classification: Tiebreakers
16 November 2023
19:45 UTC+4

United Arab Emirates	4–0	Nepal
Al Hammadi 11'; Mabkhout 36' (pen.), 44'; Lima 45+1'	Report (FIFA); Report (AFC)

Al Maktoum Stadium, Dubai
Attendance: 3,640
Referee: Hettikamkanamge Perera (Sri Lanka)
16 November 2023
21:00 UTC+3

Yemen	0–2	Bahrain
	Report (FIFA); Report (AFC)	Marhoon 38'; Al-Zubaidi 48' (o.g.)

Prince Sultan bin Abdul Aziz Stadium, Abha (Saudi Arabia) (Note: Yemen played their home matches at a neutral venue due to the ongoing Yemeni civil war.)
Attendance: 1,291
Referee: Kim Jong-hyeok (South Korea)

21 November 2023
19:00 UTC+5:45

Nepal	0–2	Yemen
	Report (FIFA); Report (AFC)	O. Al-Dahi 72'; M. Al-Dahi 90'

Dasharath Rangasala, Kathmandu
Attendance: 13,735
Referee: Shen Yinhao (China)
21 November 2023
18:45 UTC+3

Bahrain	0–2	United Arab Emirates
	Report (FIFA); Report (AFC)	Ramadan 36'; Mabkhout 90' (pen.)

Bahrain National Stadium, Riffa
Attendance: 18,267
Referee: Mohammed Al-Hoaish (Saudi Arabia)

21 March 2024
22:00 UTC+4

United Arab Emirates	2–1	Yemen
Saleh 24' (pen.); Adil 72'	Report (FIFA); Report (AFC)	Idrees 69' (o.g.)

Al Nahyan Stadium, Abu Dhabi
Attendance: 2,948
Referee: Mohanad Qasim Sarray (Iraq)
21 March 2024
22:00 UTC+3

Nepal	0–5	Bahrain
	Report (FIFA); Report (AFC)	Al-Humaidan 2'; Baqer 4'; Madan 45+4'; Al-Khattal 87'; Abdullatif 90+6'

Bahrain National Stadium, Riffa (Bahrain) (Note: Nepal played their final two home matches at a neutral venue due to the Dasharath Rangasala failing to meet FIFA standard.)
Attendance: 5,041
Referee: Alex King (Australia)

26 March 2024
22:00 UTC+3

Bahrain	3–0	Nepal
Baqer 7'; Helal 18' (pen.); Al-Aswad 36'	Report (FIFA); Report (AFC)

Bahrain National Stadium, Riffa
Attendance: 2,475
Referee: Ryo Tanimoto (Japan)
26 March 2024
22:00 UTC+3

Yemen	0–3	United Arab Emirates
	Report (FIFA); Report (AFC)	Lima 14', 22'; Adil 35'

Prince Saud bin Jalawi Stadium, Khobar (Saudi Arabia)
Attendance: 1,135
Referee: Ilgiz Tantashev (Uzbekistan)

6 June 2024
19:00 UTC+3

Nepal	0–4	United Arab Emirates
	Report (FIFA); Report (AFC)	Abdalla 12', 14'; Saleh 53'; Mohammad 75'

Prince Mohamed bin Fahd Stadium, Dammam (Saudi Arabia)
Attendance: 2,450
Referee: Payam Heydari (Iran)
6 June 2024
20:30 UTC+3

Bahrain	0–0	Yemen
	Report (FIFA); Report (AFC)

Bahrain National Stadium, Riffa
Attendance: 2,632
Referee: Nazmi Nasaruddin (Malaysia)

11 June 2024
21:00 UTC+4

United Arab Emirates	1–1	Bahrain
Adil 10'	Report (FIFA); Report (AFC)	Abduljabbar 4'

Zabeel Stadium, Dubai
Attendance: 953
Referee: Ma Ning (China)
11 June 2024
21:00 UTC+3

Yemen	2–2	Nepal
Al-Gahwashi 9' (pen.); M. Al-Dahi 90+1'	Report (FIFA); Report (AFC)	Bista 22'; Karki 66'

Prince Mohamed bin Fahd Stadium, Dammam (Saudi Arabia)
Attendance: 905
Referee: Ahmad Ibrahim (Jordan)

== Group I ==
Pos	Team	Pld	W	D	L	GF	GA	GD	Pts	Qualification	(Australia)	(Palestine)	(Lebanon)	(Bangladesh)
1	Australia	6	6	0	0	22	0	+22	18	World Cup qualifying third round and Asian Cup	—	5–0	2–0	7–0
2	Palestine	6	2	2	2	6	6	0	8	World Cup qualifying third round and Asian Cup	0–1	—	0–0	5–0
3	Lebanon	6	1	3	2	5	8	−3	6	Asian Cup qualifying third round	0–5	0–0	—	4–0
4	Bangladesh	6	0	1	5	1	20	−19	1	Asian Cup qualifying third round	0–2	0–1	1–1	—

Source: FIFA, AFC
Rules for classification: Tiebreakers
16 November 2023
20:10 UTC+11

Australia	7–0	Bangladesh
Souttar 4'; Borrello 20'; Duke 37', 40'; Maclaren 48', 70', 84'	Report (FIFA); Report (AFC)

Melbourne Rectangular Stadium, Melbourne
Attendance: 20,876
Referee: Ahrol Risqullaev (Uzbekistan)
16 November 2023
18:00 UTC+4

Lebanon	0–0	Palestine
	Report (FIFA); Report (AFC)

Khalid bin Mohammed Stadium, Sharjah (United Arab Emirates) (Note: Lebanon played all their home matches at a neutral venue due to the ongoing Israel invasion of Lebanon.)
Attendance: 200
Referee: Adham Makhadmeh (Jordan)

21 November 2023
17:45 UTC+6

Bangladesh	1–1	Lebanon
Morsalin 72'	Report (FIFA); Report (AFC)	Osman 67'

Bashundhara Kings Arena, Dhaka
Attendance: 6,297
Referee: Kim Dae-yong (South Korea)
21 November 2023
17:00 UTC+3

Palestine	0–1	Australia
	Report (FIFA); Report (AFC)	Souttar 18'

Jaber Al-Ahmad International Stadium, Kuwait City (Kuwait) (Note: Palestine played all their home matches at a neutral venue due to the ongoing Gaza war.)
Attendance: 14,537
Referee: Qasim Al-Hatmi (Oman)

21 March 2024
20:10 UTC+11

Australia	2–0	Lebanon
Baccus 5'; Rowles 54'	Report (FIFA); Report (AFC)

Western Sydney Stadium, Sydney
Attendance: 27,026
Referee: Khamis Al-Marri (Qatar)
21 March 2024 (Note: Bangladesh was originally scheduled to host Palestine on 21 March 2024 with Palestine hosting the return fixture on 26 March in Kuwait. However, the order was later reversed due to Kuwait hosting Qatar also on 26 March.)
21:30 UTC+3

Palestine	5–0	Bangladesh
Dabbagh 43', 53', 77'; S. Qunbar 45+1', 49'	Report (FIFA); Report (AFC)

Jaber Al-Ahmad International Stadium, Kuwait City (Kuwait)
Attendance: 37,432
Referee: Shen Yinhao (China)

26 March 2024
15:30 UTC+6

Bangladesh	0–1	Palestine
	Report (FIFA); Report (AFC)	Termanini 90+4'

Bashundhara Kings Arena, Dhaka
Attendance: 5,195
Referee: Nasrullo Kabirov (Tajikistan)
26 March 2024
19:45 UTC+11

Lebanon	0–5	Australia
	Report (FIFA); Report (AFC)	Yengi 2'; Jradi 47' (o.g.); Goodwin 48', 81'; Iredale 68'

Canberra Stadium, Canberra (Australia) (Note: Lebanon played this home match in Australia due to the ongoing Israel invasion of Lebanon.)
Attendance: 25,023
Referee: Mooud Bonyadifard (Iran)

6 June 2024
16:45 UTC+6

Bangladesh	0–2	Australia
	Report (FIFA); Report (AFC)	Hrustic 29'; Yengi 62'

Bashundhara Kings Arena, Dhaka
Attendance: 5,227
Referee: Jansen Foo (Singapore)
6 June 2024
19:00 UTC+3

Palestine	0–0	Lebanon
	Report (FIFA); Report (AFC)

Jassim bin Hamad Stadium, Al Rayyan (Qatar)
Attendance: 2,428
Referee: Abdulrahman Al-Jassim (Qatar)

11 June 2024
20:10 UTC+8

Australia	5–0	Palestine
Yengi 5' (pen.), 41'; Taggart 26'; Boyle 53'; Irankunda 87' (pen.)	Report (FIFA); Report (AFC)

Perth Rectangular Stadium, Perth
Attendance: 18,261
Referee: Khalid Al-Turais (Saudi Arabia)
11 June 2024
19:00 UTC+3

Lebanon	4–0	Bangladesh
Maatouk 5' (pen.), 49', 60'; Matar 45+2'	Report (FIFA); Report (AFC)

Khalifa International Stadium, Al Rayyan (Qatar)
Attendance: 13,721
Referee: Razlan Joffri Ali (Malaysia)

== Goalscorers ==
There were 331 goals scored in 107 matches, for an average of 3.09 goals per match.

7 goals

- (Qatar national football team) Almoez Ali
- (South Korea national football team) Son Heung-min

6 goals

- (Japan national football team) Ayase Ueda

5 goals

- (China national football team) Wu Lei
- (Iran national football team) Mehdi Taremi
- (Jordan national football team) Musa Al-Taamari

4 goals

- (Australia men's national soccer team) Kusini Yengi
- (Iran national football team) Sardar Azmoun
- (Iraq national football team) Aymen Hussein
- (Jordan national football team) Ali Olwan
- (North Korea national football team) Jong Il-gwan
- (Saudi Arabia national football team) Saleh Al-Shehri
- (South Korea national football team) Lee Kang-in
- (Thailand national football team) Suphanat Mueanta

3 goals

- (Australia men's national soccer team) Jamie Maclaren
- (Japan national football team) Ritsu Dōan
- (Jordan national football team) Yazan Al-Naimat
- (Kyrgyzstan national football team) Joel Kojo
- (Lebanon national football team) Hassan Maatouk
- (North Korea national football team) Ri Jo-guk
- (Oman national football team) Abdulrahman Al-Mushaifri
- (Palestine national football team) Oday Dabbagh
- (Saudi Arabia national football team) Firas Al-Buraikan
- (Syria national football team) Omar Khribin
- (United Arab Emirates national football team) Sultan Adil
- (United Arab Emirates national football team) Fábio Lima
- (United Arab Emirates national football team) Ali Mabkhout
- (Uzbekistan national football team) Eldor Shomurodov
- (Uzbekistan national football team) Oston Urunov

2 goals

- (Australia men's national soccer team) Mitchell Duke
- (Australia men's national soccer team) Craig Goodwin
- (Australia men's national soccer team) Harry Souttar
- (Bahrain national football team) Sayed Baqer
- (Iran national football team) Hossein Kanaanizadegan
- (Iran national football team) Ramin Rezaeian
- (Iraq national football team) Mohanad Ali
- (Iraq national football team) Ali Jasim
- (Japan national football team) Keito Nakamura
- (Japan national football team) Kōki Ogawa
- (Kuwait national football team) Shabaib Al-Khaldi
- (Kuwait national football team) Mohammad Daham
- (Kyrgyzstan national football team) Kai Merk
- (Malaysia national football team) Dion Cools
- (Oman national football team) Omar Al-Malki
- (Palestine national football team) Shehab Qunbar
- (Philippines national football team) Patrick Reichelt
- (Qatar national football team) Akram Afif
- (Qatar national football team) Ahmed Al-Rawi
- (Qatar national football team) Mostafa Meshaal
- (Singapore national football team) Faris Ramli
- (South Korea national football team) Hwang Hee-chan
- (Syria national football team) Moayad Ajan
- (Syria national football team) Alaa Al Dali
- (Tajikistan national football team) Amadoni Kamolov
- (Tajikistan national football team) Shahrom Samiev
- (Tajikistan national football team) Rustam Soirov
- (Thailand national football team) Supachok Sarachat
- (Turkmenistan national football team) Ruslan Mingazow
- (United Arab Emirates national football team) Harib Abdalla
- (United Arab Emirates national football team) Ali Saleh
- (Uzbekistan national football team) Otabek Shukurov
- (Vietnam national football team) Nguyễn Tiến Linh
- (Vietnam national football team) Phạm Tuấn Hải
- (Yemen national football team) Mohammed Al-Dahi

1 goal

- (Afghanistan national football team) Rahmat Akbari
- (Afghanistan national football team) Sharif Mukhammad
- (Afghanistan national football team) Amredin Sharifi
- (Australia men's national soccer team) Keanu Baccus
- (Australia men's national soccer team) Brandon Borrello
- (Australia men's national soccer team) Martin Boyle
- (Australia men's national soccer team) Ajdin Hrustic
- (Australia men's national soccer team) Nestory Irankunda
- (Australia men's national soccer team) John Iredale
- (Australia men's national soccer team) Kye Rowles
- (Australia men's national soccer team) Adam Taggart
- (Bahrain national football team) Mahdi Abduljabbar
- (Bahrain national football team) Ismail Abdullatif
- (Bahrain national football team) Kamil Al-Aswad
- (Bahrain national football team) Mahdi Al-Humaidan
- (Bahrain national football team) Ebrahim Al-Khattal
- (Bahrain national football team) Ali Madan
- (Bahrain national football team) Mohamed Marhoon
- (Bahrain national football team) Abdulla Yusuf Helal
- (Bangladesh national football team) Shekh Morsalin
- (China national football team) Fernandinho
- (China national football team) Wang Shangyuan
- (China national football team) Wei Shihao
- (China national football team) Zhang Yuning
- (Chinese Taipei national football team) Wu Yen-shu
- (Chinese Taipei national football team) Yu Yao-hsing
- (Hong Kong national football team) Everton Camargo
- (Hong Kong national football team) Ma Hei Wai
- (Hong Kong national football team) Anthony Pinto
- (Hong Kong national football team) Wong Wai
- (India national football team) Lallianzuala Chhangte
- (India national football team) Sunil Chhetri
- (India national football team) Manvir Singh
- (Indonesia national football team) Thom Haye
- (Indonesia national football team) Jay Idzes
- (Indonesia national football team) Egy Maulana Vikri
- (Indonesia national football team) Ragnar Oratmangoen
- (Indonesia national football team) Shayne Pattynama
- (Indonesia national football team) Saddil Ramdani
- (Indonesia national football team) Rizky Ridho
- (Indonesia national football team) Ramadhan Sananta
- (Iran national football team) Mehdi Ghayedi
- (Iran national football team) Mohammad Mohebi
- (Iran national football team) Omid Noorafkan
- (Iraq national football team) Amir Al-Ammari
- (Iraq national football team) Ali Al-Hamadi
- (Iraq national football team) Hussein Ali
- (Iraq national football team) Youssef Amyn
- (Iraq national football team) Zidane Iqbal
- (Iraq national football team) Osama Rashid
- (Iraq national football team) Bashar Resan
- (Iraq national football team) Zaid Tahseen
- (Japan national football team) Mao Hosoya
- (Japan national football team) Daichi Kamada
- (Japan national football team) Takefusa Kubo
- (Japan national football team) Takumi Minamino
- (Japan national football team) Yuki Soma
- (Japan national football team) Yukinari Sugawara
- (Japan national football team) Ao Tanaka
- (Jordan national football team) Mohammad Abu Zrayq
- (Jordan national football team) Noor Al-Rawabdeh
- (Jordan national football team) Saed Al-Rosan
- (Jordan national football team) Ibrahim Sadeh
- (Kuwait national football team) Eid Al Rashidi
- (Kuwait national football team) Athbi Saleh
- (Kyrgyzstan national football team) Odilzhon Abdurakhmanov
- (Kyrgyzstan national football team) Gulzhigit Alykulov
- (Kyrgyzstan national football team) Ernist Batyrkanov
- (Kyrgyzstan national football team) Khristiyan Brauzman
- (Kyrgyzstan national football team) Valery Kichin
- (Kyrgyzstan national football team) Kimi Merk
- (Kyrgyzstan national football team) Eldiyar Zarypbekov
- (Kyrgyzstan national football team) Kayrat Zhyrgalbek uulu
- (Lebanon national football team) Nader Matar
- (Lebanon national football team) Majed Osman
- (Malaysia national football team) Adib Raop
- (Malaysia national football team) Faisal Halim
- (Malaysia national football team) Paulo Josué
- (Malaysia national football team) Darren Lok
- (Malaysia national football team) Safawi Rasid
- (Myanmar national football team) Soe Moe Kyaw
- (Myanmar national football team) Wai Lin Aung
- (Myanmar national football team) Win Naing Tun
- (Nepal national football team) Sanjeeb Bista
- (Nepal national football team) Gillespye Jung Karki
- (North Korea national football team) Choe Ju-song
- (North Korea national football team) Han Kwang-song
- (North Korea national football team) Ri Hyong-jin
- (North Korea national football team) Ri Il-song
- (Oman national football team) Mohammed Al-Ghafri
- (Oman national football team) Muhsen Al-Ghassani
- (Oman national football team) Issam Al-Sabhi
- (Oman national football team) Mataz Saleh
- (Pakistan national football team) Rahis Nabi
- (Palestine national football team) Michel Termanini
- (Philippines national football team) Kevin Ingreso
- (Qatar national football team) Yusuf Abdurisag
- (Qatar national football team) Tameem Al-Abdullah
- (Qatar national football team) Hassan Al-Haydos
- (Qatar national football team) Ahmed Alaaeldin
- (Qatar national football team) Yousef Aymen
- (Saudi Arabia national football team) Salem Al-Dawsari
- (Saudi Arabia national football team) Musab Al-Juwayr
- (Saudi Arabia national football team) Abdulrahman Ghareeb
- (Saudi Arabia national football team) Ali Lajami
- (Saudi Arabia national football team) Abdullah Radif
- (Singapore national football team) Shawal Anuar
- (Singapore national football team) Ikhsan Fandi
- (Singapore national football team) Jacob Mahler
- (South Korea national football team) Bae Jun-ho
- (South Korea national football team) Cho Gue-sung
- (South Korea national football team) Hwang Ui-jo
- (South Korea national football team) Joo Min-kyu
- (South Korea national football team) Jung Seung-hyun
- (South Korea national football team) Lee Jae-sung
- (South Korea national football team) Park Jin-seob
- (Syria national football team) Omar Al Somah
- (Syria national football team) Ibrahim Hesar
- (Tajikistan national football team) Vahdat Hanonov
- (Tajikistan national football team) Shervoni Mabatshoev
- (Tajikistan national football team) Ehson Panjshanbe
- (Tajikistan national football team) Manuchekhr Safarov
- (Tajikistan national football team) Parvizdzhon Umarbayev
- (Thailand national football team) Poramet Arjvirai
- (Thailand national football team) Jaroensak Wonggorn
- (Thailand national football team) Sarach Yooyen
- (Turkmenistan national football team) Meýlis Durdyýew
- (Turkmenistan national football team) Şanazar Tirkişow
- (United Arab Emirates national football team) Khalifa Al Hammadi
- (United Arab Emirates national football team) Hazem Mohammad
- (United Arab Emirates national football team) Abdullah Ramadan
- (Uzbekistan national football team) Husniddin Aliqulov
- (Uzbekistan national football team) Rustam Ashurmatov
- (Uzbekistan national football team) Khojimat Erkinov
- (Uzbekistan national football team) Sherzod Nasrullaev
- (Uzbekistan national football team) Igor Sergeev
- (Vietnam national football team) Nguyễn Đình Bắc
- (Vietnam national football team) Nguyễn Văn Toàn
- (Yemen national football team) Omar Al-Dahi
- (Yemen national football team) Nasser Al-Gahwashi

1 own goal

- (Chinese Taipei national football team) Pan Wen-chieh (against Oman)
- (Indonesia national football team) Jordi Amat (against Iraq)
- (Kyrgyzstan national football team) Odilzhon Abdurakhmanov (against Malaysia)
- (Kyrgyzstan national football team) Khristiyan Brauzman (against Malaysia)
- (Kyrgyzstan national football team) Alimardon Shukurov (against Oman)
- (Lebanon national football team) Bassel Jradi (against Australia)
- (Syria national football team) Thaer Krouma (against Japan)
- (United Arab Emirates national football team) Abdulla Idrees (against Yemen)
- (Yemen national football team) Harwan Al-Zubaidi (against Bahrain)

== Discipline ==
A player was automatically suspended for the next match for the following infractions:

- Receiving a red card (red card suspensions may be extended for serious infractions)
- Receiving two yellow cards in two different matches (yellow card suspensions are carried forward to further qualification rounds, but not the finals or any other future international matches)

The following suspensions were served during the second round:

Team	Player	Infraction(s)	Suspended for match(es)
Afghanistan	Haroon Amiri	(yellow card) vs India (26 March 2024); (yellow card) vs Qatar (6 June 2024)	vs Kuwait (11 June 2024)
Afghanistan	Farzad Ataei	(yellow card) (yellow-red card) vs Qatar (16 November 2023)	vs Kuwait (21 November 2023)
Afghanistan	Mahboob Hanifi	(yellow card) vs Qatar (16 November 2023); (yellow card) vs India (26 March 2024)	vs Qatar (6 June 2024)
Afghanistan	Omid Popalzay	(yellow card) vs Mongolia (17 October 2023); (yellow card) vs Qatar (6 June 2024)	vs Kuwait (11 June 2024)
Australia	Keanu Baccus	(yellow card) vs Bangladesh (16 November 2023); (yellow card) vs Lebanon (21 March 2024)	vs Lebanon (26 March 2024)
Bahrain	Mohamed Al-Hardan	(yellow card) vs Yemen (16 November 2023); (yellow card) vs United Arab Emirates (21 November 2023)	vs Nepal (21 March 2024)
Bahrain	Waleed Al Hayam	(yellow card) vs United Arab Emirates (21 November 2023); (yellow card) vs Nepal (21 March 2024)	vs Nepal (26 March 2024)
Bahrain	Ali Madan	(yellow card) vs United Arab Emirates (21 November 2023); (yellow card) vs Nepal (21 March 2024)	vs Nepal (26 March 2024)
Bangladesh	Bishwanath Ghosh	(yellow card) vs Maldives (12 October 2023); (yellow card) vs Palestine (26 March 2024)	vs Australia (6 June 2024)
Bangladesh	Rakib Hossain	(yellow card) vs Maldives (17 October 2023); (yellow card) vs Australia (16 November 2023)	vs Lebanon (21 November 2023)
Bangladesh	Mojibur Rahman Jony	(yellow card) vs Palestine (21 March 2024); (yellow card) vs Palestine (26 March 2024)	vs Australia (6 June 2024)
Bangladesh	Mohamed Sohel Rana	(yellow card) vs Maldives (12 October 2023); (yellow card) (yellow-red card) vs Maldives (17 October 2023)	vs Australia (16 November 2023)
Bangladesh	Sohel Rana	(yellow card) vs Maldives (17 October 2023); (yellow card) vs Lebanon (21 November 2023)	vs Palestine (21 March 2024)
Bangladesh	Saad Uddin	(yellow card) vs Maldives (12 October 2023); (yellow card) vs Australia (16 November 2023)	vs Lebanon (21 November 2023)
China	Li Yuanyi	(red card) vs Singapore (26 March 2024)	vs Thailand (6 June 2024)
China	Wu Lei	(yellow card) vs South Korea (21 November 2023); (yellow card) vs Singapore (26 March 2024)	vs Thailand (6 June 2024)
Chinese Taipei	Wang Chien-ming	(yellow card) vs Timor-Leste (12 October 2023); (yellow card) vs Malaysia (21 November 2023)	vs Kyrgyzstan (21 March 2024)
Chinese Taipei	Wen Chih-hao	(yellow card) vs Malaysia (21 November 2023); (yellow card) vs Oman (6 June 2024)	vs Malaysia (11 June 2024)
India	Vikram Partap Singh	(yellow card) vs Afghanistan (21 March 2024); (yellow card) vs Afghanistan (26 March 2024)	vs Kuwait (6 June 2024)
Indonesia	Jordi Amat	(red card) vs Iraq (6 June 2024)	vs Philippines (11 June 2024)
Indonesia	Asnawi Mangkualam	(yellow card) vs Iraq (16 November 2023); (yellow card) vs Philippines (21 November 2023)	vs Vietnam (21 March 2024)
Indonesia	Witan Sulaeman	(yellow card) vs Vietnam (21 March 2024); (yellow card) vs Vietnam (26 March 2024)	vs Iraq (6 June 2024)
Indonesia	Sandy Walsh	(yellow card) vs Brunei (17 October 2023); (yellow card) vs Vietnam (21 March 2024)	vs Vietnam (26 March 2024)
Iran	Mohammad Kanaani	(yellow card) vs Uzbekistan (21 November 2023); (yellow card) vs Turkmenistan (26 March 2024)	vs Hong Kong (6 June 2024)
Jordan	Mohammad Abu Hashish	(yellow card) vs Tajikistan (16 November 2023); (yellow card) vs Saudi Arabia (21 November 2023)	vs Pakistan (21 March 2024)
Jordan	Nizar Al-Rashdan	(yellow card) vs Saudi Arabia (21 November 2023); (yellow card) vs Pakistan (21 March 2024)	vs Pakistan (26 March 2024)
Jordan	Abdallah Nasib	(yellow card) vs Tajikistan (16 November 2023); (yellow card) vs Saudi Arabia (21 November 2023)	vs Pakistan (21 March 2024)
Kuwait	Faisal Zayid	(yellow card) (yellow-red card) vs India (16 November 2023)	vs Afghanistan (21 November 2023)
Kyrgyzstan	Odilzhon Abdurakhmanov	(yellow card) vs Malaysia (16 November 2023); (yellow card) vs Oman (21 November 2023)	vs Chinese Taipei (21 March 2024)
Kyrgyzstan	Said Datsiev	(yellow card) (yellow-red card) vs Chinese Taipei (21 March 2024)	vs Chinese Taipei (26 March 2024)
Lebanon	Jihad Ayoub	(yellow card) vs Palestine (16 November 2023); (yellow card) vs Bangladesh (21 November 2023)	vs Australia (21 March 2024)
Lebanon	Khalil Khamis	(yellow card) vs Australia (26 March 2024); (yellow card) vs Palestine (6 June 2024)	vs Bangladesh (11 June 2024)
Lebanon	Ali Tneich	(yellow card) vs Palestine (16 November 2023); (yellow card) vs Australia (26 March 2024)	vs Palestine (6 June 2024)
Myanmar	Hein Phyo Win	(yellow card) (yellow-red card) vs Syria (26 March 2024)	vs Japan (6 June 2024)
Myanmar	Hein Zeyar Lin	(yellow card) vs Macau (17 October 2023); (yellow card) vs North Korea (21 November 2023)	vs Syria (21 March 2024)
Myanmar	Wai Lin Aung	(yellow card) vs Japan (16 November 2023); (yellow card) vs Syria (21 March 2024)	vs Syria (26 March 2024)
Nepal	Manish Dangi	(yellow card) vs Laos (17 October 2023); (yellow card) vs Bahrain (21 March 2024)	vs Bahrain (26 March 2024)
Nepal	Dinesh Henjan	(yellow card) vs Laos (17 October 2023); (yellow card) vs Bahrain (26 March 2024)	vs United Arab Emirates (6 June 2024)
Oman	Issam Al-Sabhi	(yellow card) vs Kyrgyzstan (21 November 2023); (yellow card) vs Malaysia (21 March 2024)	vs Malaysia (26 March 2024)
Pakistan	Shayak Dost	(yellow card) vs Cambodia (17 November 2023); (yellow card) vs Saudi Arabia (16 November 2023)	vs Tajikistan (21 November 2023)
Pakistan	Alamgir Ghazi	(yellow card) vs Tajikistan (21 November 2023); (yellow card) vs Jordan (26 March 2024)	vs Saudi Arabia (6 June 2024)
Pakistan	Abdullah Iqbal	(yellow card) vs Cambodia (17 October 2023); (yellow card) vs Jordan (21 March 2024)	vs Jordan (26 March 2024)
Pakistan	Muhammad Umar Hayat	(yellow card) vs Cambodia (12 October 2023); (yellow card) vs Saudi Arabia (16 November 2023)	vs Tajikistan (21 November 2023)
Palestine	Oday Kharoub	(yellow card) vs Bangladesh (26 March 2024); (yellow card) vs Lebanon (6 June 2024)	vs Australia (11 June 2024)
Palestine	Ameed Mahajna	(yellow card) vs Bangladesh (21 March 2024); (yellow card) (yellow-red card) vs Bangladesh (26 March 2024)	vs Lebanon (6 June 2024)
Palestine	Camilo Saldaña	(yellow card) vs Australia (21 November 2023); (yellow card) vs Bangladesh (26 March 2024)	vs Lebanon (6 June 2024)
Philippines	Santiago Rublico	(yellow card) vs Vietnam (16 November 2023); (yellow card) vs Indonesia (21 November 2023)	vs Iraq (21 March 2024)
Qatar	Yusuf Abdurisag	(yellow card) vs Kuwait (26 March 2024); (yellow card) vs Afghanistan (6 June 2024)	vs India (11 June 2024)
Qatar	Ahmed Fathy	(yellow card) vs Kuwait (26 March 2024); (yellow card) vs Afghanistan (6 June 2024)	vs India (11 June 2024)
Saudi Arabia	Ali Al-Bulaihi	(yellow card) vs Jordan (21 November 2023); (yellow card) vs Tajikistan (21 March 2024)	vs Tajikistan (26 March 2024)
Singapore	Jacob Mahler	(yellow card) vs China (21 March 2024); (yellow card) vs China (26 March 2024)	vs South Korea (6 June 2024)
Singapore	Shah Shahiran	(yellow card) vs Guam (17 October 2023); (yellow card) vs South Korea (16 November 2023)	vs Thailand (21 November 2023)
Singapore	Lionel Tan	(yellow card) vs Guam (17 October 2023); (yellow card) vs China (21 March 2024)	vs China (26 March 2024)
Turkmenistan	Abdy Bäşimow	(yellow card) vs Uzbekistan (16 November 2023); (yellow card) vs Hong Kong (21 November 2023)	vs Iran (21 March 2024)
United Arab Emirates	Sultan Adil	(yellow card) vs Bahrain (21 November 2023); (yellow card) vs Yemen (26 March 2024)	vs Nepal (6 June 2024)
United Arab Emirates	Khalifa Al Hammadi	(yellow card) vs Yemen (21 March 2024); (yellow card) vs Yemen (26 March 2024)	vs Nepal (6 June 2024)
United Arab Emirates	Khalid Al-Hashemi	(yellow card) vs Yemen (21 March 2024); (yellow card) vs Yemen (26 March 2024)	vs Nepal (6 June 2024)
Uzbekistan	Farrukh Sayfiev	(yellow card) vs Iran (21 November 2023); (yellow card) vs Hong Kong (26 March 2024)	vs Turkmenistan (6 June 2024)
Vietnam	Bùi Hoàng Việt Anh	(yellow card) vs Philippines (16 November 2021); (yellow card) vs Indonesia (26 March 2024)	vs Philippines (6 June 2024)
Vietnam	Nguyễn Văn Toàn	(yellow card) vs Indonesia (21 March 2024); (yellow card) vs Philippines (6 June 2024)	vs Iraq (11 June 2024)
Yemen	Nasser Al-Gahwashi	(yellow card) vs United Arab Emirates (21 March 2024); (yellow card) vs United Arab Emirates (26 March 2024)	vs Bahrain (6 June 2024)
Yemen	Harwan Al-Zubaidi	(yellow card) vs Bahrain (16 November 2023); (yellow card) vs United Arab Emirates (21 March 2024)	vs United Arab Emirates (26 March 2024)
