= Abdulrahman Al-Mushaifri =

Omani professional footballer (born 1998)

Personal information
- Full name: Abdulrahman Eid Harib Al-Mushaifri
- Date of birth: 16 August 1998 (age 28)
- Place of birth: Rustaq, Oman
- Height: 1.80 m (5 ft 11 in)
- Positions: Winger; striker

Team information
- Current team: Al-Qadsia SC
- Number: 7

Senior career*
Years	Team	Apps	(Gls)
–2018	Al-Mussanah		
2018–2020	Al-Shabab		
2020–2022	Al-Mussanah		
2022–2023	Al-Suwaiq		
2023–2025	Al-Seeb		
2025–2026	Artis Brno	27	(3)
2026–	Al-Qadsia		

International career^{‡}
2023–	Oman	33	(8)
Medal record
Men's football
Representing Oman
Gulf Cup
Runner-up	2024 Kuwait
- * Club domestic league appearances and goals as of 24 May 2026 ‡ National team caps and goals as of 8 September 2025

Abdulrahman Eid Harib Al-Mushaifri (Arabic: عبد الرحمن المشيفري; born 16 August 1998) is an Omani professional footballer who plays as a winger for the Oman national team and Al-Qadsia SC.

== Club career ==
Al-Mushaifri began his career with Al-Mussanah. In December 2018, he was transferred to Al-Shabab. He returned to Al-Mussanah in December 2020.

In July 2023, Al-Mushaifri signed for Al-Seeb, signing a two-year contract.

On 27 June 2025, Al-Mushaifri signed a one-year contract with Czech National Football League club Artis Brno with option.

== International career ==
Al-Mushaifri was called up to Oman national team's squad for the 2023 AFC Asian Cup.

On 6 June 2024, Al-Mushaifri scored hattrick in Oman's 3–0 away win against Chinese Taipei, as part of the 2026 World Cup qualifiers. He scored 2 more goals on 10 October 2024, in his team's 4–0 victory against Kuwait.

== Career statistics ==
=== International ===
As of match played 8 September 2025

Appearances and goals by national team and year
National team	Year	Apps	Goals
Oman	2023	6	1
Oman	2024	19	6
Oman	2025	8	1
Total		33	8

Scores and results list Oman's goal tally first, score column indicates score after each Al-Mushaifri goal.

List of international goals scored by Abdulrahman Al-Mushaifri
No.	Date	Venue	Opponent	Score	Result	Competition
1.	17 June 2023	Pakhtakor Central Stadium, Tashkent, Uzbekistan	Turkmenistan	1–0	2–0	2023 CAFA Nations Cup
2.	6 June 2024	Taipei Municipal Stadium, Taipei, Taiwan	Chinese Taipei	1–0	3–0	2026 FIFA World Cup qualification
3.	6 June 2024	Taipei Municipal Stadium, Taipei, Taiwan	Chinese Taipei	2–0	3–0	2026 FIFA World Cup qualification
4.	6 June 2024	Taipei Municipal Stadium, Taipei, Taiwan	Chinese Taipei	3–0	3–0	2026 FIFA World Cup qualification
5.	10 October 2024	Sultan Qaboos Sports Complex, Muscat, Oman	Kuwait	1–0	4–0	2026 FIFA World Cup qualification
6.	10 October 2024	Sultan Qaboos Sports Complex, Muscat, Oman	Kuwait	3–0	4–0	2026 FIFA World Cup qualification
7.	27 December 2024	Sulaibikhat Stadium, Sulaibikhat, Kuwait	United Arab Emirates	1–1	1–1	26th Arabian Gulf Cup
8.	4 January 2025	Jaber Al-Ahmad International Stadium, Kuwait City, Kuwait	Bahrain	1–0	1–2	26th Arabian Gulf Cup
