= Harwan Al-Zubaidi =

Yemeni footballer (born 1999)

Harwan Al-Zubaidi هارون الزبيدي
Personal information
- Full name: Harwan Mohammed Ali Al-Zubaidi
- Date of birth: 15 October 1999 (age 27)
- Place of birth: Sana'a, Yemen
- Height: 1.88 m (6 ft 2 in)
- Position: Midfielder

Team information
- Current team: Miami FC
- Number: 2

Senior career*
Years	Team	Apps	(Gls)
2019–2020	CF Santi Jordi	10	(0)
2019–2020	CD Burriana	3	(0)
2020–2021	Hartley Wintney U23	6	(1)
2021–2022	Westchester Flames	16	(1)
2021–2022	Atlètic Quart de les Valls	1	(2)
2022–2023	Al-Wehda		
2022–2023	Fahman		
2023–2024	Al-Hala		
2024–2025	Atlètic Quart de les Valls	2	(0)
2025–2025	Al-Zawraa	7	(1)
2025–2026	Erbil	22	(1)
2026–	Miami FC	6	(1)

International career^{‡}
2023–	Yemen	23	(4)
- * Club domestic league appearances and goals as of 13:38, 8 November 2026 (UTC) ‡ National team caps and goals as of 01:17, 27 November 2025 (UTC)

Harwan Al-Zubaidi (Arabic: هارون الزبيدي; born 15 October 1999) is a Yemeni footballer who plays for USL Championship club Miami FC and the Yemen national team.

== Club career ==
Al-Zubaidi was born in Sana'a, Yemen. He later played high school soccer in the United States with New Rochelle High School. He had a standout career with the team before graduating in 2017. He went on to join the International Development Academy (IDA) and had stints in the United Kingdom and Spain.

For the 2018/19 season, Al-Zubaidi joined CF Santi Jordi in Spain's Preferente Valenciana. He made ten appearances for the club before joining CD Burriana of the same league. He made three additional appearances for Burriana over the remainder of the season. Following his time in Spain, he returned to New York and joined the Westchester Flames of the USL League Two for the 2021 and 2022 seasons. In total, Al-Zubaidi made sixteen appearances for the club, scoring one goal. He then moved to England and joined the under-23 team of Hartley Wintney F.C. in the Suburban Football League. He made six appearances, scoring one goal, during the 2021/2022 season.

Following his time in England, Al-Zubaidi had a brief return to Spain, playing a single match and scoring two goals for Atlètic Quart de les Valls. From Spain he joined several clubs in the Middle East including Al-Wehda SC and Fahman SCC in his native Yemen before making the breakthrough and joining Al-Hala SC of the Bahraini Premier League. Following his departure from the club, the player returned to Spain for another brief stint with Atlètic Quart de les Valls.

In January 2025, Al-Zubaidi signed a professional contract with Al-Zawraa SC of the Iraqi Stars League. In 2026, he moved to Miami FC of the USL Championship.

== International career ==
Al-Zubaidi made his senior international debut for Yemen on 6 January 2023 in a 25th Arabian Gulf Cup match against Saudi Arabia. He scored two goals in the 26th edition of the tournament, including a strike against Saudi Arabia and Bahrain. His 88th-minute strike against the latter secured the 2–1 victory and Yemen's first-ever win in the tournament.

=== International goals ===
Scores and results list Yemen's goal tally first.

No.	Date	Venue	Opponent	Score	Result	Competition
1.	25 December 2024	Sulaibikhat Stadium, Sulaibikhat, Kuwait	Saudi Arabia	1–0	2–3	26th Arabian Gulf Cup
2.	28 December 2024	Sulaibikhat Stadium, Sulaibikhat, Kuwait	Bahrain	2–1	2–1	26th Arabian Gulf Cup
3.	18 November 2025	Ali Sabah Al-Salem Stadium, Farwaniya, Kuwait	Bhutan	1–0	7–1	2027 AFC Asian Cup qualification
4.	26 November 2025	Grand Hamad Stadium, Doha, Qatar	Comoros	1–0	4–4 (2–4 p)	2025 FIFA Arab Cup qualification
Last updated 26 November 2025

=== International career statistics ===
As of match played 26 November 2025

Yemen
Year	Apps	Goals
2023	6	0
2024	8	2
2025	6	2
Total	20	4
