= Musab Al-Juwayr =

Saudi Arabian footballer (born 2003)

Personal information
- Full name: Musab Fahd Al-Juwayr
- Date of birth: 20 June 2003 (age 23)
- Place of birth: Riyadh, Saudi Arabia
- Height: 1.75 m (5 ft 9 in)
- Position: Midfielder

Team information
- Current team: Al-Qadsiah
- Number: 10

Youth career
- 2015–2021: Al-Hilal

Senior career*
| Years | Team | Apps | (Gls) |
| 2021–2025 | Al-Hilal | 24 | (5) |
| 2024 | → Al-Shabab (loan) | 15 | (3) |
| 2024–2025 | → Al-Shabab (loan) | 29 | (4) |
| 2025– | Al-Qadsiah | 39 | (7) |

International career^{‡}
| 2017–2019 | Saudi Arabia U17 | | |
| 2020–2023 | Saudi Arabia U20 | | |
| 2022– | Saudi Arabia U23 | | |
| 2023– | Saudi Arabia | 42 | (6) |
- * Club domestic league appearances and goals as of 9 October 2026 ‡ National team caps and goals as of 17 November 2026

Musab Fahd Al-Juwayr (Arabic: مُصْعَب فَهْد الْجُوَيْر; born 20 June 2003) is a Saudi Arabian professional footballer who plays as a midfielder for Saudi Pro League club Al-Qadsiah. Since 2023, he has also played for the Saudi Arabia national team.

== Club Career ==
Al-Juwayr started his career at the youth teams of Al-Hilal. He was promoted to the first team during the 2021 summer training camp. He signed his first professional contract with the club on 8 August 2021. He made his debut on 13 September 2021 in the AFC Champions League match against Esteghlal. Al-Juwayr made his league debut and scored his first goal for the club on 4 November in the 2–0 win against Damac. On 12 January 2024, Al-Juwayr renewed his contract with Al-Hilal before joining Al-Shabab on a six-month loan. On 1 September 2024, Al-Juwayr once again joined Al-Shabab on loan.

On 3 August 2025, Al-Juwayr joined Al-Qadsiah on a five-year deal.

== International Career ==
On 31 May 2026, he was named in the 26-man squad for the 2026 FIFA World Cup.

== Career statistics ==
=== Club ===
As of match played 4 July 2025

| Club | Season | League | | | King's Cup | | Asia | | Other | | Total | |
| Club | Season | Division | Apps | Goals | Apps | Goals | Apps | Goals | Apps | Goals | Apps | Goals |
|---|---|---|---|---|---|---|---|---|---|---|---|---|
| Al-Hilal | 2021–22 | Saudi Pro League | 8 | 2 | 3 | 0 | 3 (Note: Appearance(s) in AFC Champions League) | 0 | 1 (Note: Appearance(s) in FIFA Club World Cup) | 0 | 15 | 2 |
| Al-Hilal | 2022–23 | Saudi Pro League | 12 | 2 | 1 | 0 | 1 | 0 | 1 | 0 | 15 | 2 |
| Al-Hilal | 2023–24 | Saudi Pro League | 2 | 0 | 0 | 0 | 1 | 0 | 4 (Note: Appearances in Arab Club Champions Cup) | 0 | 7 | 0 |
| Al-Hilal | 2024–25 | Saudi Pro League | 2 | 1 | 0 | 0 | 0 | 0 | 5 | 0 | 7 | 1 |
| Al-Hilal | Total | | 24 | 5 | 4 | 0 | 5 | 0 | 11 | 0 | 44 | 5 |
| Al-Shabab (loan) | 2023–24 | Saudi Pro League | 15 | 3 | 0 | 0 | — | | — | | 15 | 3 |
| Al-Shabab (loan) | 2024–25 | Saudi Pro League | 29 | 4 | 4 | 0 | — | | — | | 33 | 4 |
| Al-Shabab (loan) | Total | | 44 | 7 | 4 | 0 | — | | — | | 48 | 7 |
| Al-Qadsiah | 2025–26 | Saudi Pro League | 0 | 0 | 0 | 0 | — | | 0 | 0 | 0 | 0 |
| Career total | | | 68 | 12 | 8 | 0 | 5 | 0 | 11 | 0 | 92 | 12 |

=== International ===
| No. | Date | Venue | Opponent | Score | Result | Competition |
|---|---|---|---|---|---|---|
| 1. | 6 January 2023 | Basra International Stadium, Basra, Iraq | Yemen | 2–0 | 2–0 | 25th Arabian Gulf Cup |
| 2. | 6 June 2024 | Jinnah Sports Stadium, Islamabad, Pakistan | Pakistan | 3–0 | 3–0 | 2026 FIFA World Cup qualification |
| 3. | 5 September 2024 | King Abdullah Sports City Stadium, Jeddah, Saudi Arabia | Indonesia | 1–1 | 1–1 | 2026 FIFA World Cup qualification |
| 4. | 22 December 2024 | Jaber Al-Ahmad International Stadium, Kuwait City, Kuwait | Bahrain | 1–2 | 2–3 | 26th Arabian Gulf Cup |
| 5. | 25 December 2024 | Sulaibikhat Stadium, Sulaibikhat, Kuwait | Yemen | 2–2 | 3–2 | 26th Arabian Gulf Cup |
| 6. | 5 June 2025 | Bahrain National Stadium, Riffa, Bahrain | Bahrain | 1–0 | 2–0 | 2026 FIFA World Cup qualification |

== Honours ==
Al-Hilal

- Saudi Pro League: 2021–22
- King's Cup: 2022–23
- Saudi Super Cup: 2021, 2024
- AFC Champions League: 2021

Saudi Arabia U20

- Arab Cup U-20: 2021, 2022

Saudi Arabia U23

- WAFF U-23 Championship: 2022

Individual

- Saudi Pro League Rising Star of the Month: April 2024, September 2024, October 2024, November 2024, January 2025, February 2025, March 2025, April 2025
- Saudi Pro League Young Player of the Season: 2024–25
- Saudi Pro League Saudi Player of the Season: 2025–26
