= 26th Arabian Gulf Cup =

كأس الخليج العربي 26

Tournament details
- Host country: Kuwait
- Dates: 21 December 2024 – 4 January 2025
- Teams: 8 (from 1 confederation)
- Venues: 2 (in 2 host cities)

Final positions
- Champions: Bahrain (2nd title)
- Runners-up: Oman

Tournament statistics
- Matches played: 15
- Goals scored: 41 (2.73 per match)
- Attendance: 390,990 (26,066 per match)
- Top scorer(s): (Bahrain) Mohamed Marhoon (Oman) Issam Al-Sabhi (Saudi Arabia) Abdullah Al-Hamdan (3 goals each)
- Best player: (Bahrain) Mohamed Marhoon
- Best goalkeeper: (Bahrain) Ebrahim Lutfalla

The 26th Arabian Gulf Cup, known as Khaleeji Zain 26 for sponsorship reasons, was the 26th edition of the Arabian Gulf Cup for the eight members of the Arab Gulf Cup Football Federation. The tournament was held in Kuwait from 21 December 2024 to 4 January 2025.

Bahrain won the competition for the second time, beating Oman 2–1 in the final.

== Teams ==
Team	Appearance	Previous best performance	FIFA Rankings
Team	Appearance	Previous best performance	November 2024
Qatar	26th	Winners (1992, 2004, 2014)	48
Iraq (holders)	17th	Winners (1979, 1984, 1988, 2023)	56
Saudi Arabia	25th	Winners (1994, 2002, 2003–04)	59
United Arab Emirates	25th	Winners (2007, 2013)	63
Bahrain	26th	Winners (2019)	81
Oman	24th	Winners (2009, 2017–18)	80
Kuwait (hosts)	26th	Winners (1970, 1972, 1974, 1976, 1982, 1986, 1990, 1996, 1998, 2010)	134
Yemen	11th	Group stage (2003–04, 2004, 2007, 2009, 2010, 2013, 2014, 2017–18, 2019, 2023)	157

=== Draw ===
The draw was held on 9 November 2024 at 19:00 UTC+3 in Kuwait City. The eight teams were drawn into two groups of four, by selecting one team from each of the four ranked pots. Their pot positions were based on the FIFA rankings from 24 October 2024 (shown in parentheses). Host nation Kuwait and defending champions Iraq were automatically seeded at the top of Groups A and B, respectively.

Pot 1	Pot 2	Pot 3	Pot 4
Kuwait (135) (hosts); Iraq (56) (holders)	Qatar (46); Saudi Arabia (59)	United Arab Emirates (68); Bahrain (76)	Oman (80); Yemen (154)

=== Squads ===
Each team had to register a squad of 26 players, three of whom had to be goalkeepers.

== Venues ==
Location of areas hosting the 26th Arabian Gulf Cup
1 Ardhiya
2 Sulaibikhat

Kuwait City
Ardhiya	Sulaibikhat
Jaber Al-Ahmad International Stadium	Sulaibikhat Stadium
Capacity: 60,000	Capacity: 15,000 (new)

== Officials ==
Referees

- (Algeria) Mustapha Ghorbal
- (Bahrain) Ammar Mahfoodh
- (Iraq) Mohanad Qasim Sarray
- (Kuwait) Ahmad Al-Ali
- (Mauritania) Dahane Beida
- (Oman) Qasim Al-Hatmi
- (Qatar) Abdulrahman Al-Jassim
- (Romania) István Kovács
- (Saudi Arabia) Khalid Al-Turais
- (Turkey) Halil Umut Meler
- (United Arab Emirates) Omar Al-Ali

Assistant referees

- (Bahrain) Abdulla Al-Rowaimi
- (Bahrain) Mohamed Salman
- (Iraq) Watheq Al-Swaiedi
- (Kuwait) Ahmad Abbas
- (Kuwait) Abdulhadi Al-Anezi
- (Qatar) Saoud Al-Maqaleh
- (Qatar) Taleb Al-Marri
- (Saudi Arabia) Mohammed Al-Abakry
- (Saudi Arabia) Abdelraheem Al-Shammari
- (United Arab Emirates) Jasem Al-Ali
- (United Arab Emirates) Mohamed Al-Hammadi

Fourth officials

- (Algeria) Mokrane Gourari
- (Algeria) Abbès Zerhouni
- (Mauritania) Brahim Hmade
- (Mauritania) Youssouf Yahia
- (Oman) Nasser Al-Busaidi
- (Oman) Hamed Al-Ghafer
- (Romania) Mircea Grigoriu
- (Romania) Ferencz Tunyogi
- (Turkey) Kerem Ersoy
- (Turkey) İbrahim Çağlar Uyarcan

Video Assistant Referees

- (China) Fu Ming
- (Egypt) Mahmoud Ashour
- (Iraq) Ahmed Rsetam
- (Japan) Jumpei Iida
- (Kuwait) Abdullah Jamali
- (Qatar) Khamis Al-Marri
- (Saudi Arabia) Abdullah Al-Shehri
- (Tunisia) Haythem Guirat
- (United Arab Emirates) Mohamed Khadim

== Group stage ==
Tiebreakers
Teams were ranked according to points (3 points for a win, 1 point for a draw, 0 points for a loss), and if tied on points, the following tiebreaking criteria were applied, in the order given, to determine the rankings:
1. Points in head-to-head matches among tied teams;
2. Goal difference in head-to-head matches among tied teams;
3. Goals scored in head-to-head matches among tied teams;
4. If more than two teams were tied, and after applying all head-to-head criteria above, a subset of teams were still tied, all head-to-head criteria above were reapplied exclusively to this subset of teams;
5. Goal difference in all group matches;
6. Goals scored in all group matches;
7. Disciplinary points (yellow card = 1 point, red card as a result of two yellow cards = 3 points, direct red card = 3 points, yellow card followed by direct red card = 4 points);
8. Drawing of lots.

All times are local (UTC+03:00).

=== Group A ===
Pos	Team	Pld	W	D	L	GF	GA	GD	Pts	Qualification
1	Oman	3	1	2	0	4	3	+1	5 (Note: Disciplinary points: Oman –7, Kuwait –9)	Advance to knockout stage
2	Kuwait (H)	3	1	2	0	4	3	+1	5	Advance to knockout stage
3	United Arab Emirates	3	0	2	1	3	4	−1	2 (Note: Disciplinary points: United Arab Emirates –6, Qatar –11)	
4	Qatar	3	0	2	1	3	4	−1	2	

Source: AGCFF
Rules for classification: Group stage tiebreakers
(H) Hosts
Notes:
21 December 2024
20:00

Kuwait	1–1	Oman
Nasser 34'	Report	Al-Sabhi 42'

Jaber International Stadium, Kuwait City
Attendance: 42,445
Referee: Khalid Al-Turais (Saudi Arabia)
21 December 2024
22:30

Qatar	1–1	United Arab Emirates
Afif 17' (pen.)	Report	Al-Ghassani 45+1'

Sulaibikhat Stadium, Sulaibikhat
Attendance: 5,007
Referee: István Kovács (Romania)

24 December 2024
17:25

Oman	2–1	Qatar
Al-Sabhi 20' (pen.), 52'	Report	Ali 2'

Sulaibikhat Stadium, Sulaibikhat
Attendance: 4,552
Referee: Mohanad Qasim Sarray (Iraq)
24 December 2024
20:30

United Arab Emirates	1–2	Kuwait
Caio 5'	Report	Daham 16'; M. Al-Enezi 89'

Jaber International Stadium, Kuwait City
Attendance: 48,621
Referee: Dahane Beida (Mauritania)

27 December 2024
17:30

Kuwait	1–1	Qatar
Daham 74'	Report	Muntari 90+11'

Jaber International Stadium, Kuwait City
Attendance: 57,742
Referee: Mustapha Ghorbal (Algeria)
27 December 2024
17:30

United Arab Emirates	1–1	Oman
Al-Ghassani 20'	Report	Al-Mushaifri 79'

Sulaibikhat Stadium, Sulaibikhat
Attendance: 7,813
Referee: Ammar Mahfoodh (Bahrain)

=== Group B ===
Pos	Team	Pld	W	D	L	GF	GA	GD	Pts	Qualification
1	Bahrain	3	2	0	1	6	4	+2	6 (Note: Head-to-head points: Bahrain 3, Saudi Arabia 0)	Advance to knockout stage
2	Saudi Arabia	3	2	0	1	8	6	+2	6	Advance to knockout stage
3	Iraq	3	1	0	2	2	5	−3	3 (Note: Head-to-head points: Iraq 3, Yemen 0)	
4	Yemen	3	1	0	2	4	5	−1	3	

Source: AGCFF
Rules for classification: Group stage tiebreakers
Notes:
22 December 2024
17:25

Iraq	1–0	Yemen
Hussein 64'	Report

Sulaibikhat Stadium, Sulaibikhat
Attendance: 7,203
Referee: Abdulrahman Al-Jassim (Qatar)
22 December 2024
20:30

Saudi Arabia	2–3	Bahrain
Al-Juwayr 73'; Al-Shehri 86' (pen.)	Report	Abduljabbar 19'; Al-Humaidan 38'; Marhoon 76'

Jaber International Stadium, Kuwait City
Attendance: 7,726
Referee: Ahmad Al-Ali (Kuwait)

25 December 2024
17:25

Yemen	2–3	Saudi Arabia
Al-Zubaidi 8'; Sabarah 27'	Report	Kanno 30'; Al-Juwayr 57' (pen.); Al-Hamdan 90+3'

Sulaibikhat Stadium, Sulaibikhat
Attendance: 9,200
Referee: Qasim Al-Hatmi (Oman)
25 December 2024
20:30

Bahrain	2–0	Iraq
Madan 38', 47'	Report

Jaber International Stadium, Kuwait City
Attendance: 13,150
Referee: Halil Umut Meler (Turkey)

28 December 2024
17:30

Iraq	1–3	Saudi Arabia
Ali 64'	Report	Al-Dawsari 57' (pen.); Al-Hamdan 81', 86'

Jaber International Stadium, Kuwait City
Attendance: 54,942
Referee: István Kovács (Romania)
28 December 2024
17:30

Bahrain	1–2	Yemen
Al-Romaihi 62'	Report	Al-Khatal 41' (o.g.); Al-Zubaidi 88'

Sulaibikhat Stadium, Sulaibikhat
Attendance: 4,293
Referee: Omar Al-Ali (United Arab Emirates)

== Knockout stage ==
In the knockout stage, extra time and a penalty shoot-out were used to decide the winner if necessary.

=== Bracket ===
Semi-finals
31 December 2024 – Sulaibikhat
Oman	2
Saudi Arabia	1
31 December 2024 – Kuwait City
Bahrain	1
Kuwait	0

Final
4 January 2025 – Kuwait City
Oman	1
Bahrain	2

=== Semi-finals ===
31 December 2024
17:30

Oman	2–1	Saudi Arabia
A. Al-Alawi 74'; Al-Busaidi 85'	Report	Kanno 87'

Sulaibikhat Stadium, Sulaibikhat
Attendance: 10,500
Referee: Halil Umut Meler (Turkey)

31 December 2024
20:45

Bahrain	1–0	Kuwait
Marhoon 75'	Report

Jaber International Stadium, Kuwait City
Attendance: 60,122
Referee: István Kovács (Romania)

=== Final ===
4 January 2025
19:30

Oman	1–2	Bahrain
Al-Mushaifri 17'	Report	Marhoon 78' (pen.); Al-Musalami 80' (o.g.)

Jaber International Stadium, Kuwait City
Attendance: 57,674
Referee: Abdulrahman Al-Jassim (Qatar)

== Winner ==
26th Arabian Gulf Cup Winner

Bahrain
Second title

== Goalscorers ==
There were 41 goals scored in 15 matches, for an average of 2.73 goals per match.

3 goals

- (Bahrain) Mohamed Marhoon
- (Oman) Issam Al-Sabhi
- (Saudi Arabia) Abdullah Al-Hamdan

2 goals

- (Bahrain) Ali Madan
- (Kuwait) Mohammad Daham
- (Oman) Abdulrahman Al-Mushaifri
- (Saudi Arabia) Musab Al-Juwayr
- (Saudi Arabia) Mohamed Kanno
- (United Arab Emirates) Yahya Al-Ghassani
- (Yemen) Harwan Al-Zubaidi

1 goal

- (Bahrain) Mahdi Abduljabbar
- (Bahrain) Mahdi Al-Humaidan
- (Bahrain) Mohamed Al-Romaihi
- (Iraq) Mohanad Ali
- (Iraq) Aymen Hussein
- (Kuwait) Moath Al-Enezi
- (Kuwait) Yousef Nasser
- (Oman) Arshad Al-Alawi
- (Oman) Ali Al-Busaidi
- (Qatar) Akram Afif
- (Qatar) Almoez Ali
- (Qatar) Mohammed Muntari
- (Saudi Arabia) Salem Al-Dawsari
- (Saudi Arabia) Saleh Al-Shehri
- (United Arab Emirates) Caio Canedo
- (Yemen) Abdul Majeed Sabarah

1 own goal

- (Bahrain) Ebrahim Al-Khattal (against Yemen)
- (Oman) Mohammed Al-Musalami (against Bahrain)

== Prize money and awards ==
=== Prize money ===
Position	Amount (USD)
Champions	1,000,000
Runner-up	750,000
Total	1,750,000

=== Player awards ===
The following awards were given:

Award	Player
Top Scorer	(Bahrain) Mohamed Marhoon
Most Valuable Player	(Bahrain) Mohamed Marhoon
Best Goalkeeper	(Bahrain) Ebrahim Lutfalla

== Broadcasters ==
Middle East

Territory	Broadcaster	Ref.
Bahrain	Bahrain Sport	
Iraq	Al-Iraqiya Sports; Alrabiaa Sports	
Kuwait	KTV Sports	
Oman	Oman Sports	
Qatar	Alkass	
Saudi Arabia	SSC; KSA Sport	
United Arab Emirates	AD Sports; Dubai Sports	
Yemen	SSC; Alkass (via free YouTube streaming)	

Others

Territory	Broadcaster	Ref.
United States of America	ESPN+	
Netherlands	ESPN	
Portugal	Sport TV	
