= Mohamed Marhoon =

Bahraini footballer (born 1998)

Personal information
- Full name: Mohamed Jasim Mohamed Ali Abdulla Marhoon
- Date of birth: 12 February 1998 (age 28)
- Place of birth: Jidhafs, Bahrain
- Height: 1.76 m (5 ft 9 in)
- Positions: Winger; midfielder

Team information
- Current team: Kuwait SC
- Number: 18

Senior career*
Years	Team	Apps	(Gls)
2015–2016	Sitra		(1)
2016–2019	Al-Riffa		(7)
2019	Bohemians 1905	1	(0)
2019–2022	Al-Riffa		(16)
2022–	Kuwait SC		

International career^{‡}
2015–2016	Bahrain U20	7	(5)
2017	Bahrain U19	3	(0)
2017–2018	Bahrain U23	7	(1)
2018–	Bahrain	74	(19)
Medal record
Men's football
Representing Bahrain
Gulf Cup
Winner	2024 Kuwait
Winner	2019 Qatar
- * Club domestic league appearances and goals as of 14:56, 27 May 2019 (UTC) ‡ National team caps and goals as of 20:10, 4 January 2025 (UTC)

Mohamed Jasim Mohamed Ali Abdulla Marhoon (Arabic: مُحَمَّد جَاسِم مُحَمَّد عَلِيّ عَبْد الله مَرْهُون; born 12 February 1998) is a Bahraini footballer who plays as a midfielder for Kuwait SC and the Bahrain national team.

== International career ==
Marhoon was included in Bahrain's squad for the 2019 AFC Asian Cup in the United Arab Emirates.

In the 26th Arabian Gulf Cup, Marhoon emerged as the joint top scorer with three goals, including a decisive penalty in the final against Oman. He was also named the tournament's best player as his team secured their second title in the competition.

== Career statistics ==
As of match played on 15 January 2025

Appearances and goals by club, season and competition
Club	Season	League			Cup		Continental		Other		Total	
Club	Season	Division	Apps	Goals	Apps	Goals	Apps	Goals	Apps	Goals	Apps	Goals
Kuwait	2022–23	KPL		8					4	2		8
Kuwait	2023–24	KPL		8			5	0	2	0		8
Kuwait	2024–25	KPL	9	5	0	0	6	3	0	0	15	8
Kuwait	Total			21			11	3	6	2		

As of 4 January 2025

Bahrain
Year	Apps	Goals
2018	5	2
2019	7	1
2020	3	2
2021	16	7
2022	12	0
2023	11	2
2024	19	3
2025	1	1
Total	74	19

Scores and results list Bahrain's goal tally first.

No.	Date	Venue	Opponent	Score	Result	Competition
1.	16 October 2018	Bahrain National Stadium, Riffa, Bahrain	Myanmar	2–0	4–1	Friendly
2.	16 October 2018	Bahrain National Stadium, Riffa, Bahrain	Myanmar	3–1	4–1	Friendly
3.	5 December 2019	Abdullah bin Khalifa Stadium, Doha, Qatar	Iraq	2–2	2–2	24th Arabian Gulf Cup
4.	12 November 2020	Theyab Awana Stadium, Dubai, United Arab Emirates	Lebanon	3–1	3–1	Friendly
5.	16 November 2020	Al Maktoum Stadium, Dubai, United Arab Emirates	United Arab Emirates	1–1	3–1	Friendly
6.	25 March 2021	Bahrain National Stadium, Riffa, Bahrain	Syria	3–1	3–1	Friendly
7.	28 May 2021	Bahrain National Stadium, Riffa, Bahrain	Malaysia	2–0	2–0	Friendly
8.	1 September 2021	Bahrain National Stadium, Riffa, Bahrain	Haiti	3–0	6–1	Friendly
9.	7 September 2021	Bahrain National Stadium, Riffa, Bahrain	Jordan	1–2	1–2	Friendly
10.	6 October 2021	Bahrain National Stadium, Riffa, Bahrain	Curaçao	1–0	4–0	Friendly
11.	16 November 2021	Bahrain National Stadium, Riffa, Bahrain	Kyrgyzstan	2–2	4–2	Friendly
12.	16 November 2021	Bahrain National Stadium, Riffa, Bahrain	Kyrgyzstan	3–2	4–2	Friendly
13.	12 September 2023	Police Officers' Club Stadium, Dubai, United Arab Emirates	Turkmenistan	1–0	1–1	Friendly
14.	16 November 2023	Prince Sultan bin Abdulaziz Sports City, Abha, Saudi Arabia	Yemen	1–0	2–0	2026 FIFA World Cup qualification
15.	10 October 2024	Bahrain National Stadium, Riffa, Bahrain	Indonesia	1–0	2–2	2026 FIFA World Cup qualification
16.	10 October 2024	Bahrain National Stadium, Riffa, Bahrain	Indonesia	2–2	2–2	2026 FIFA World Cup qualification
17.	22 December 2024	Jaber Al-Ahmad International Stadium, Kuwait City, Kuwait	Saudi Arabia	3–1	3–2	26th Arabian Gulf Cup
18.	31 December 2024	Jaber Al-Ahmad International Stadium, Kuwait City, Kuwait	Kuwait	1–0	1–0	26th Arabian Gulf Cup
19.	4 January 2025	Jaber Al-Ahmad International Stadium, Kuwait City, Kuwait	Oman	1–1	2–1	26th Arabian Gulf Cup

== Honours ==
Kuwait SC

- Kuwait Premier League: 2022–23, 2023–24, 2024–25
- Kuwait Emir Cup: 2022–23
- Kuwait Super Cup: 2022, 2023–24
- AFC Challenge League: 2025–26

Bahrain

- Arabian Gulf Cup: 2019, 2024–25

Individual

- Arabian Gulf Cup Best Player: 2024–25
- Arabian Gulf Cup Top Scorer: 2024–25
