= Mohamed Al-Romaihi =

Bahraini footballer

Personal information
- Full name: Mohamed Saad Marzooq Almla Marzooq Al-Romaihi
- Date of birth: 9 September 1990 (age 36)
- Place of birth: Manama, Bahrain
- Height: 1.86 m (6 ft 1 in)
- Position: Forward

Team information
- Current team: Al-Khaldiya
- Number: 23

Senior career*
Years	Team	Apps	(Gls)
2008–2014	Bahrain SC		(6)
2014–2015	East Riffa		(8)
2015–2016	Hidd SCC		(8)
2016–2018	Riffa SC		(3)
2018–2024	Manama Club		(5)
2025–	Al-Khaldiya		

International career^{‡}
2010	Bahrain U23	2	(0)
2016–	Bahrain	46	(16)
Medal record
Men's football
Representing Bahrain
WAFF Championship
Winner	2019 Iraq
Gulf Cup
Winner	2019 Qatar
Winner	2024 Kuwait
- * Club domestic league appearances and goals as of 22:36, 25 March 2016 (UTC) ‡ National team caps and goals as of 27 September 2022 (UTC)

Mohamed Saad Marzooq Almla Marzooq Al-Romaihi (Arabic: محمد سعد الرميحي; born 9 September 1990) is a Bahraini professional footballer who currently plays as a forward for Al-Khaldiya and the Bahrain national team.

== Career ==
On 8 December 2019, Al Romaihi scored the winning goal for Bahrain in a 1–0 win against Saudi Arabia, which granted them their first Gulf Cup title in the 24th Arabian Gulf Cup.

== International career ==
As of 1 September 2021

=== International goals ===
Scores and results list Bahrain's goal tally first.

No.	Date	Venue	Opponent	Score	Result	Competition
1.	24 March 2016	Bahrain National Stadium, Riffa, Bahrain	Yemen	3–0	3–0	2018 FIFA World Cup qualification
2.	1 September 2016	Bahrain National Stadium, Riffa, Bahrain	Singapore	1–0	3–1	Friendly
3.	7 October 2016	Rizal Memorial Stadium, Manila, Philippines	Philippines	3–1	3–1	Friendly
4.	11 October 2016	Sultan Qaboos Sports Complex, Muscat, Oman	Oman	1–0	2–2	Friendly
5.	13 June 2017	Sport toplumy, Daşoguz, Turkmenistan	Turkmenistan	1–0	2–1	2019 AFC Asian Cup qualification
6.	20 December 2018	Khalifa Sports City Stadium, Isa Town, Bahrain	Tajikistan	1–0	5–0	Friendly
7.	29 December 2018	Khalifa Sports City Stadium, Isa Town, Bahrain	North Korea	1–0	4–0	Friendly
8.	5 January 2019	Zayed Sports City Stadium, Abu Dhabi, United Arab Emirates	United Arab Emirates	1–0	1–1	2019 AFC Asian Cup
9.	22 January 2019	Rashid Stadium, Dubai, United Arab Emirates	South Korea	1–1	1–2 (a.e.t.)	2019 AFC Asian Cup
10.	8 December 2019	Abdullah bin Khalifa Stadium, Doha, Qatar	Saudi Arabia	1–0	1–0	24th Arabian Gulf Cup
11.	7 November 2020	Police Officers' Club Stadium, Dubai, United Arab Emirates	Tajikistan	1–0	1–0	Friendly
12.	16 November 2020	Al Maktoum Stadium, Dubai, United Arab Emirates	United Arab Emirates	2–1	3–1	Friendly
13.	16 November 2020	Al Maktoum Stadium, Dubai, United Arab Emirates	United Arab Emirates	3–1	3–1	Friendly
14.	30 March 2021	Bahrain National Stadium, Riffa, Bahrain	Jordan	1–2	1–2	Friendly
15.	3 June 2021	Bahrain National Stadium, Riffa, Bahrain	Cambodia	2–0	8–0	2022 FIFA World Cup qualification
16.	1 September 2021	Bahrain National Stadium, Riffa, Bahrain	Haiti	2–0	6–1	Friendly
17.	28 December 2024	Sulaibikhat Stadium, Sulaibikhat, Kuwait	Yemen	1–1	1–2	26th Arabian Gulf Cup
18.	17 November 2025	Bahrain National Stadium, Riffa, Bahrain	Somalia	1–0	1–2	Friendly
19.	26 November 2025	Jassim bin Hamad Stadium, Al Rayyan, Qatar	Djibouti	1–0	1–0	2025 FIFA Arab Cup qualification
20.	9 December 2025	Education City Stadium, Al Rayyan, Qatar	Sudan	2–1	3–1	2025 FIFA Arab Cup

== Honours ==
=== Club ===
Hidd SCC

- Bahraini Super Cup: 2015

Bahrain SC

- Bahraini 2nd Division: (Runner-up) 2013–14

=== International ===
Bahrain

- WAFF Championship: 2019
- Arabian Gulf Cup: 2019

=== Individual ===
- Bahrain First Division League top scorer: 2015–16
