= Saudi Sports Company =

Saudi sports satellite TV network

- Country: Saudi Arabia
- Broadcast area: Middle East and North Africa (MENA) and Saudi Arabia
- Headquarters: Riyadh, Saudi Arabia

Programming
- Languages: Arabic; English
- Picture format: (1080p MPEG-4 HDTV) (2160p HEVC UHDTV)

Ownership
- Key people: Waleed bin Ibrahim Al Ibrahim (Chairman); Amill Lone (CEO); Amanda-Grace Tafunai (Chief of Staff); Loutfallah Hamouch (Head of Multi Sports Department); Tariq Almansour (Media and Communications manager)

History
- Launched: 5 April 2021
- Closed: 5 October 2025 (4 years, 183 days)

Links
- Website: ssc.tv

Availability

Terrestrial
- Nojoom Alrabiaa: Watch live Only in Iraq

Streaming media
- Shahid VIP & Shahid Sports: Watch live in Middle East & North Africa
- Oredoo tv Sports package: Watch live Only in Qatar
- Elife tv Sports package: Watch live Only in UAE

Saudi Sports Company (SSC) was a Saudi Arabian sports network.

== History ==
The channels were created in 2021 to be the home of the Saudi top football competitions and many other sports. SSC offered free broadcast to some of their channels by having the top commentators behind the paywall and new commentators in the free channels. In 2024, SSC announced that IMG will produce the Saudi Pro League, King's Cup, and Saudi Super Cup for the next 5 years. On 14 June 2025, SSC lost the broadcasting rights of the Saudi competitions to the Thmanyah Company. The channel was closed on 5 October 2025 and its broadcasting rights went to MBC Group.

== Former channels ==
=== HD ===
- SSC1 HD
- SSC2 HD
- SSC3 HD
- SSC4 HD (FREE)
- SSC5 HD
- SSC Extra 1 HD
- SSC Extra 2 HD
- SSC Extra 3 HD
- SSC NEWS HD (FREE)

=== SD ===
- SSC1 SD (FREE)
- SSC5 SD (FREE)

27500

=== EXTRA ===
- SSC EXTRA 1 SD (FREE)
- SSC EXTRA 2 SD (FREE)
