= Ebrahim Al-Khattal =

Bahraini professional footballer

Personal information
- Birth name: Ebrahim Mubarak Ebrahim Mubarak Isa Al-Khattal
- Date of birth: May 11, 2000 (age 26)
- Place of birth: Manama, Bahrain
- Height: 1.75 m (5 ft 9 in)
- Position: Attacking midfielder

Team information
- Current team: Manama
- Number: 20

Senior career*
Years	Team	Apps	(Gls)
2018–2022	Qalali Club		
2020–2021	→Al-Khaldiya (loan)		
2022–	Manama		

International career^{‡}
2022–	Bahrain	16	(3)
Medal record
Men's football
Representing Bahrain
Gulf Cup
Winner	2024 Kuwait
- * Club domestic league appearances and goals as of 06:15, 10 January 2024 (UTC) ‡ National team caps and goals as of 06:15, 10 January 2024 (UTC)

Ebrahim Mubarak Ebrahim Mubarak Isa Al-Khattal (Arabic: إِبْرَاهِيم مُبَارَك إِبْرَاهِيم مُبَارَك عِيسَى الْخَتَال; born 11 May 2000) is a Bahraini professional footballer who plays as an attacking midfielder for Manama Club (Manama), and the Bahrain national team.

== Career ==
Al-Khattal began his senior career in the Bahrain Second Division with Qalali Club in 2018. He spent the 2020–21 season on loan with the newly established team Al-Khaldiya. In January 2022, he moved to the Bahraini Premier League club Al-Manama Club on a 5-year contract, and helped them win the 2022–23 Bahrain FA Cup.

== International ==
Al-Khattal debuted for the Bahrain national team in a 3–1 friendly win over Uganda on 27 January 2022. He was called up for the 25th Arabian Gulf Cup in 2023. He was called up to the national team for the 2023 AFC Asian Cup, where he was the youngest Bahraini player in the squad.

=== International goals ===
Scores and results list Bahrain's goal tally first.

No.	Date	Venue	Opponent	Score	Result	Competition
1.	27 January 2022	Bahrain National Stadium, Riffa, Bahrain	Uganda	2–1	3–1	Friendly
2.	31 May 2022	BG Stadium, Thanyaburi, Thailand	Thailand	1–1	2–1	Friendly
3.	17 October 2023	Al Muharraq Stadium, Arad, Bahrain	Philippines	1–0	1–0	Friendly
4.	21 March 2024	Bahrain National Stadium, Riffa, Bahrain	Nepal	4–0	5–0	2026 FIFA World Cup qualification

== Honours ==
Al-Hidd

- Bahraini FA Cup: 2022–23
