= Oman national football team results (2020–present) =

This article provides details of international football games played by the Oman national football team from 2020 to present.

== Results ==
Key
Win
Draw
Defeat

=== 2021 ===
20 March Friendly	Oman	0–0	Jordan	Dubai, United Arab Emirates
17:45 UTC+4		Report		Stadium: Maktoum bin Rashid Al Maktoum Stadium; Referee: Ali Al Samaheeji (Bahrain)

25 March Friendly	Oman	1–1	India	Dubai, United Arab Emirates
17:45 UTC+4	C. Singh 43' (o.g.)	Report	M. Singh 55'	Stadium: Maktoum bin Rashid Al Maktoum Stadium; Referee: Omar Al Ali (United Arab Emirates)

25 May Friendly	Thailand	0–1	Oman	Dubai, United Arab Emirates
19:15 UTC+4		Report	Al-Muqbali 43'	Stadium: The Sevens Stadium; Referee: Mohammed Abdulla Alali (United Arab Emirates)

29 May Friendly	Oman	3–1	Indonesia	Dubai, United Arab Emirates
19:00 UTC+4	Al-Ghassani 40'; Al-Hajri 77', 88'	Report	Dimas 51'	Stadium: The Sevens Stadium; Referee: Yahya Ali Al Mulla (United Arab Emirates)

7 June 2022 WCQ / 2023 ACQ	Oman	0–1	Qatar	Doha, Qatar
20:00 UTC+3		Report	Al-Haydos 40' (pen.)	Stadium: Jassim bin Hamad Stadium; Attendance: 1,559; Referee: Hettikamkanamge Perera (Sri Lanka)

11 June 2022 WCQ / 2023 ACQ	Afghanistan	1–2	Oman	Doha, Qatar
20:10 UTC+3	Popalzay 24'	Report	Fawaz 14', 52'	Stadium: Jassim bin Hamad Stadium; Attendance: 183; Referee: Ma Ning (China)

15 June 2022 WCQ / 2023 ACQ	Bangladesh	0–3	Oman	Doha, Qatar
20:00 UTC+3		Report	Al-Ghafri 22'; Al-Hajri 61', 81'	Stadium: Jassim bin Hamad Stadium; Attendance: 885; Referee: Ali Shaban (Kuwait)

20 June 2021 FIFA Arab Cup qualification	Oman	2–1	Somalia	Doha, Qatar
20:00 UTC+3	Al-Ghassani 12'; Al-Yahyaei 36' (pen.)	Report	Gigli 54'	Stadium: Jassim bin Hamad Stadium; Attendance: 551; Referee: Benoît Bastien (France)

2 September 2022 World Cup qualification	Japan	0–1	Oman	Suita, Japan
19:15 UTC+9		Report	Al-Sabhi 88'	Stadium: Suita City Football Stadium; Attendance: 4,853; Referee: Mohammed Abdulla Hassan Mohamed (United Arab Emirates)

7 September 2022 World Cup qualification	Oman	0–1	Saudi Arabia	Muscat, Oman
20:00 UTC+4		Report	Al-Shehri 42'	Stadium: Sultan Qaboos Sports Complex; Attendance: 8,150; Referee: Hanna Hattab (Syria)

26 September Friendly	Nepal	2–7	Oman	Doha, Qatar
19:00 UTC+3	A. Tamang 45+6'; 83'	Report	Durbin 16'; Gohar 45+6'; Al Sabhi 48'; Al-Ghassani 51'; Al-Muqbali 60', 65'; Al-Yahmadi 76'	Stadium: Qatar University Stadium

7 October 2022 World Cup qualification	Australia	3–1	Oman	Doha, Qatar
21:30 UTC+3	Mabil 9'; Boyle 49'; Duke 89'	Report	Al-Alawi 28'	Stadium: Khalifa International Stadium; Attendance: 0 Referee: Nawaf Shukralla (Bahrain)

12 October 2022 World Cup qualification	Oman	3–1	Vietnam	Muscat, Oman
20:00 UTC+4	Al Sabhi 45+1'; Al-Khaldi 49'; Al-Yahyaei 63' (pen.)	Report	Nguyễn Tiến Linh 39'	Stadium: Sultan Qaboos Sports Complex; Attendance: 9,123; Referee: Adham Makhadmeh (Jordan)

11 November 2022 World Cup qualification	China	1–1	Oman	Sharjah, United Arab Emirates
19:00 UTC+4	Wu Lei 21'	Report	Al-Harthi 75'	Stadium: Sharjah Stadium; Attendance: 1,700; Referee: Sivakorn Pu-udom (Thailand)

16 November 2022 World Cup qualification	Oman	0–1	Japan	Muscat, Oman
20:00 UTC+4		Report	Ito 81'	Stadium: Sultan Qaboos Sports Complex; Attendance: 14,123; Referee: Ko Hyung-jin (South Korea)

30 November 2021 FIFA Arab Cup GS	Iraq	1–1	Oman	Al Wakrah, Qatar
19:00 UTC+3	Abdulkareem 90+8' (pen.)	Report	Al-Yahyaei 78' (pen.)	Stadium: Al Janoub Stadium; Attendance: 1,576; Referee: Said Martínez (Honduras)

3 December 2021 FIFA Arab Cup GS	Oman	1–2	Qatar	Al Rayyan, Qatar
16:00 UTC+3	Al-Hajri 74'	Report	Afif 32' (pen.); Durbin 90+7' (o.g.)	Stadium: Education City Stadium; Attendance: 23,254; Referee: Wilton Sampaio (Brazil)

6 December 2021 FIFA Arab Cup GS	Oman	3–0	Bahrain	Al Rayyan, Qatar
22:00 UTC+3	R. Al-Alawi 41'; A. Al-Alawi 50'; Al-Hajri 59'	Report		Stadium: Ahmed bin Ali Stadium; Attendance: 2,477; Referee: Ryuji Sato (Japan)

10 December 2021 FIFA Arab Cup QF	Tunisia	2–1	Oman	Al Rayyan, Qatar
18:00 UTC+3	Jaziri 16'; Msakni 69'	Report	A. Al-Alawi 66'	Stadium: Education City Stadium; Attendance: 21,329; Referee: Daniel Siebert (Germany)

=== 2022 ===
27 January 2022 World Cup qualification	Saudi Arabia	1–0	Oman	Jeddah, Saudi Arabia
20:15 UTC+3	Al-Buraikan 48'	Report		Stadium: King Abdullah Sports City; Attendance: 47,364; Referee: Nawaf Shukralla (Bahrain)

1 February 2022 World Cup qualification	Oman	2–2	Australia	Muscat, Oman
20:00 UTC+4	Fawaz 54', 89' (pen.)	Report	Maclaren 15' (pen.); Mooy 79'	Stadium: Sultan Qaboos Sports Complex; Attendance: 0 Referee: Mohammed Abdulla Hassan Mohamed (United Arab Emirates)

24 March 2022 World Cup qualification	Vietnam	0–1	Oman	Hanoi, Vietnam
19:00 UTC+7		Report	Al-Hajri 65'	Stadium: Mỹ Đình National Stadium; Attendance: 6,923; Referee: Hanna Hattab (Syria)

29 March 2022 World Cup qualification	Oman	2–0	China	Muscat, Oman
20:00 UTC+4	Al-Alawi 12'; Fawaz 74'	Report		Stadium: Sultan Qaboos Sports Complex; Attendance: 2,500; Referee: Ko Hyung-jin (South Korea)

3 June Friendly	Nepal	0–2	Oman	Doha, Qatar
19:00 UTC+3		Report	Al-Malki 44'; Al-Sabhi 89'	Stadium: Suheim bin Hamad Stadium

9 June Friendly	Oman	0–0	New Zealand	Al Rayyan, Qatar
21:00 UTC+3		Report		Stadium: Education City Stadium

23 September 2022 Jordan International Tournament	Iraq	1–1 (3–4 p)	Oman	Amman, Jordan
18:00 UTC+3	Hussein 85'	Report	Al-Malki 82'	Stadium: King Abdullah II Stadium; Attendance: 500; Referee: Mohamad Issa (Lebanon)
	Penalties
	Hussein (penalty missed); Attwan (penalty scored); Ahmed (penalty scored); Rostam (penalty missed); Adnan (penalty scored); Karim (penalty missed)		(penalty missed) Al-Yahyaei; (penalty missed) Al-Malki; (penalty scored) Al-Sabhi; (penalty scored) Saleh; (penalty scored) Al-Musalami; (penalty scored) Al-Yahmadi

26 September 2022 Jordan International Tournament	Jordan	1–0	Oman	Amman, Jordan
20:00 UTC+3	Haddad 66' (pen.)	Report		Stadium: King Abdullah II Stadium

16 November Friendly	Oman	0–1	Germany	Muscat, Oman
21:00 UTC+4		Report	Füllkrug 80'	Stadium: Sultan Qaboos Sports Complex; Attendance: 25,654; Referee: Mohammed Al-Hoish (Saudi Arabia)

20 November Friendly	Oman	2–0	Belarus	Al Ain, United Arab Emirates
18:00 UTC+4	Al-Yahyaei 78'; Al-Sabhi 81'	Report		Stadium: Khalifa bin Zayed Stadium; Attendance: 150; Referee: Adel Al Naqbi (United Arab Emirates)

23 December Friendly	Syria	1–2	Oman	Dubai, United Arab Emirates
20:00 UTC+4	Ashkar 60'	Report	Al Subhi 21'; Saleh 58'	Stadium: Maktoum bin Rashid Al Maktoum Stadium; Referee: Ahmed Darwish (United Arab Emirates)

30 December Friendly	Oman	1–0	Syria	Dubai, United Arab Emirates
18:00 UTC+4	Al-Braiki 85'	Report		Stadium: Police Officers' Club Stadium; Referee: Adel Al Naqbi (United Arab Emirates)

=== 2023 ===
6 January 25th Arabian Gulf Cup GS	Iraq	0–0	Oman	Basra, Iraq
19:00 UTC+3		Report		Stadium: Basra International Stadium; Referee: István Kovács (Romania)

9 January 25th Arabian Gulf Cup GS	Oman	3–2	Yemen	Basra, Iraq
16:15 UTC+3	Fadhl 2' (o.g.); A. Al-Alawi 37'; Al-Sabhi 47'	Report	Al-Matari 12' (pen.); O. Al-Dahi 30'	Stadium: Basra International Stadium; Referee: Abdullah Jamali (Kuwait)

12 January 25th Arabian Gulf Cup GS	Saudi Arabia	1–2	Oman	Basra, Iraq
18:00 UTC+3	Al-Ammar 41'	Report	R. Al-Alawi 34'; Al-Saadi 84'	Stadium: Al-Minaa Olympic Stadium; Referee: Ma Ning (China)

16 January 25th Arabian Gulf Cup SF	Bahrain	0–1	Oman	Basra, Iraq
20:15 UTC+3		Report	Al-Yahmadi 83'	Stadium: Al-Minaa Olympic Stadium; Referee: Adel Al Naqbi (United Arab Emirates)

19 January 25th Arabian Gulf Cup F	Iraq	3–2 (a.e.t.)	Oman	Basra, Iraq
19:00 UTC+3	Bayesh 24'; Attwan 116' (pen.); Younis 120+2'	Report	Al-Yahyaei 90+10' (pen.); Al-Malki 119'	Stadium: Basra International Stadium; Attendance: 64,570; Referee: István Kovács (Romania)

27 March Friendly	Lebanon	0–2	Oman	Muscat, Oman
22:00 UTC+4		Report	Al Sabhi 27', 80'	Stadium: Sultan Qaboos Sports Complex

11 June 2023 CAFA Nations Cup	Uzbekistan	3–0	Oman	Tashkent, Uzbekistan
20:30 UTC+5	Masharipov 7', 24'; Alijonov 89'	Report		Stadium: Milliy Stadium; Attendance: 12,912; Referee: Dayirbek Abdilaev (Kyrgyzstan)

14 June 2023 CAFA Nations Cup	Oman	1–1	Tajikistan	Tashkent, Uzbekistan
18:30 UTC+5	Al-Yahyaei 14' (pen.)	Report	Hanonov 44'	Stadium: Pakhtakor Central Stadium; Referee: Kirill Levnikov (Russia)

17 June 2023 CAFA Nations Cup	Turkmenistan	0–2	Oman	Tashkent, Uzbekistan
18:30 UTC+5		Report	Al-Mushaifri 42'; Al-Sabhi 76'	Stadium: Pakhtakor Central Stadium

20 June 2023 CAFA Nations Cup 3rd	Kyrgyzstan	0–1	Oman	Tashkent, Uzbekistan
18:30 UTC+5		Report	Al-Alawi 71'	Stadium: Pakhtakor Central Stadium; Referee: Axrol Riskullaev (Uzbekistan)

6 September Friendly	Oman	2–1	Palestine	Muscat, Oman
18:45 UTC+4	Al-Malki 20'; Al-Ghassani 36' (pen.)	Report	Abu Warda 3'	Stadium: Sultan Qaboos Sports Complex

12 September Friendly	United States	4–0	Oman	Saint Paul, United States
20:30 UTC−5	Balogun 13'; Aaronson 60'; Pepi 79'; Al-Braiki 81' (o.g.)	Report		Stadium: Allianz Field; Attendance: 13,665; Referee: Mario Escobar (Guatemala)

16 November 2026 WCQ / 2027 ACQ	Oman	3–0	Chinese Taipei	Muscat, Oman
19:00 UTC+4	Al-Malki 17'; Pan Wen-chieh 41' (o.g.); Saleh 90+2'	Report (FIFA); Report (AFC)		Stadium: Sultan Qaboos Sports Complex; Attendance: 4,155; Referee: Sadullo Gulmurodi (Tajikistan)

21 November 2026 WCQ / 2027 ACQ	Kyrgyzstan	1–0	Oman	Bishkek, Kyrgyzstan
20:00 UTC+6	Abdurakhmanov 49'	Report (FIFA); Report (AFC)		Stadium: Dolen Omurzakov Stadium; Attendance: 10,783; Referee: Mooud Bonyadifard (Iran)

29 December Friendly	China	0–2	Oman	Abu Dhabi, United Arab Emirates
19:15 UTC+4		Report	A. Al-Alawi 49'; Mu. Al-Ghassani 65'	Stadium: Baniyas Stadium

=== 2024 ===
6 January Friendly	United Arab Emirates	0–1	Oman	Abu Dhabi, United Arab Emirates
19:15 UTC+4		Report	Fawaz 5'	Stadium: Al Nahyan Stadium; Referee: Abdulla Al-Shehri (Saudi Arabia)

16 January 2023 Asian Cup GS	Saudi Arabia	2–1	Oman	Al Rayyan, Qatar
20:30 UTC+3	Ghareeb 78'; Al-Bulaihi 90+6'	Report	Al-Yahyaei 14' (pen.)	Stadium: Khalifa International Stadium; Attendance: 41,987; Referee: Shaun Evans (Australia)

21 January 2023 Asian Cup GS	Oman	0–0	Thailand	Doha, Qatar
17:30 UTC+3		Report		Stadium: Abdullah bin Khalifa Stadium; Attendance: 6,340; Referee: Mooud Bonyadifard (Iran)

25 January 2023 Asian Cup GS	Kyrgyzstan	1–1	Oman	Doha, Qatar
18:00 UTC+3	Kojo 80'	Report	Al-Ghassani 8'	Stadium: Abdullah bin Khalifa Stadium; Attendance: 6,231; Referee: Ahmad Al-Ali (Kuwait)

21 March 2026 WCQ / 2027 ACQ	Oman	2–0	Malaysia	Muscat, Oman
22:00 UTC+4	Al-Sabhi 58'; Al-Ghassani 88'	Report		Stadium: Sultan Qaboos Sports Complex; Attendance: 21,836; Referee: Fu Ming (China)

26 March 2026 WCQ / 2027 ACQ	Malaysia	0–2	Oman	Kuala Lumpur, Malaysia
22:00 UTC+8		Report	Al-Malki 45+4' (pen.); Al-Ghafri 90+4'	Stadium: Bukit Jalil National Stadium; Attendance: 26,499; Referee: Ko Hyung-jin (South Korea)

6 June 2026 WCQ / 2027 ACQ	Chinese Taipei	0–3	Oman	Taipei, Taiwan
19:00 UTC+8		Report (FIFA); Report (AFC)	Al-Mushaifri 31', 55', 75'	Stadium: Taipei Municipal Stadium; Attendance: 5,700; Referee: Zaid Thamer (Iraq)

11 June 2026 WCQ / 2027 ACQ	Oman	1–1	Kyrgyzstan	Muscat, Oman
20:00 UTC+4	Tokotayev 57' (o.g.)	Report (FIFA); Report (AFC)	Zarypbekov 19'	Stadium: Sultan Qaboos Sports Complex; Attendance: 13,754; Referee: Alireza Faghani (Australia)

5 September 2026 World Cup qualification	Iraq	1–0	Oman	Basra, Iraq
19:00 UTC+3	Hussein 13'	Report		Stadium: Basra International Stadium; Attendance: 63,720; Referee: Khalid Al-Turais (Saudi Arabia)

10 September 2026 World Cup qualification	Oman	1–3	South Korea	Muscat, Oman
18:00 UTC+4	Jung Seung-hyun 45+2' (o.g.)	Report	Hwang Hee-Chan 10'; Son Heung-min 82'; Joo Min-kyu 90+11'	Stadium: Sultan Qaboos Sports Complex; Attendance: 27,144; Referee: Ma Ning (China)

10 October 2026 World Cup qualification	Oman	4–0	Kuwait	Muscat, Oman
20:00 UTC+4	Al-Mushaifri 17', 58'; Al-Ghassani 30'; Fawaz 79'	Report		Stadium: Sultan Qaboos Sports Complex; Attendance: 25,891; Referee: Alireza Faghani (Australia)

15 October 2026 World Cup qualification	Jordan	4–0	Oman	Amman, Jordan
19:00 UTC+3	Al-Naimat 26', 54'; Olwan 49' (pen.), 87'	Report		Stadium: Amman International Stadium; Attendance: 14,515; Referee: Khalid Al-Turais (Saudi Arabia)

14 November 2026 World Cup qualification	Oman	1–0	Palestine	Muscat, Oman
20:00 UTC+4	Al-Ghassani 83'	Report		Stadium: Sultan Qaboos Sports Complex; Attendance: 21,754; Referee: Fu Ming (China)

19 November 2026 World Cup qualification	Oman	0–1	Iraq	Muscat, Oman
20:00 UTC+4		Report	Amyn 36'	Stadium: Sultan Qaboos Sports Complex; Attendance: 26,377; Referee: Omar Mohamed Al Ali (United Arab Emirates)

16 December Friendly	Oman	1–0	Yemen	Muscat, Oman
19:00 UTC+4	Al-Busaidi 75'	Report		Stadium: Sultan Qaboos Sports Complex

21 December 26th Arabian Gulf Cup GS	Kuwait	1–1	Oman	Kuwait City, Kuwait
20:00 UTC+3	Nasser 34'	Report	Al-Sabhi 42'	Stadium: Jaber Al-Ahmad International Stadium; Attendance: 42,445; Referee: Khalid Al-Turais (Saudi Arabia)

24 December 26th Arabian Gulf Cup GS	Oman	2–1	Qatar	Kuwait City, Kuwait
17:25 UTC+3	Al-Sabhi 20' (pen.), 52'	Report	Ali 2'	Stadium: Sulaibikhat Stadium; Attendance: 4,552; Referee: Mohanad Qasim Sarray (Iraq)

27 December 26th Arabian Gulf Cup GS	United Arab Emirates	1–1	Oman	Kuwait City, Kuwait
17:30 UTC+3	Al-Ghassani 20'	Report	Al-Mushaifri 79'	Stadium: Sulaibikhat Stadium; Attendance: 7,813; Referee: Ammar Mahfoodh (Bahrain)

31 December 26th Arabian Gulf Cup SF	Oman	2–1	Saudi Arabia	Kuwait City, Kuwait
17:30 UTC+3	A. Al-Alawi 74'; Al-Busaidi 85'	Report	Kanno 87'	Stadium: Sulaibikhat Stadium; Attendance: 10,500; Referee: Halil Umut Meler (Turkey)

=== 2025 ===
4 January 26th Arabian Gulf Cup F	Oman	1–2	Bahrain	Kuwait City, Kuwait
19:00 UTC+3	Al-Mushaifri 17'	Report	Marhoon 78' (pen.); Al-Musalami 80' (o.g.)	Stadium: Jaber Al-Ahmad International Stadium; Attendance: 57,674; Referee: Abdulrahman Al-Jassim (Qatar)

13 March Friendly	Oman	0–0	Sudan	Muscat, Oman
22:00 UTC+4		Report		Stadium: Sultan Qaboos Sports Complex; Referee: Mohamed Abdalla Al-Harmoodi (United Arab Emirates)

20 March 2026 World Cup qualification	South Korea	1–1	Oman	Goyang, South Korea
20:00 UTC+9	Hwang Hee-chan 41'	Report	Al-Busaidi 80'	Stadium: Goyang Stadium; Attendance: 59,579; Referee: Alireza Faghani (Australia)

25 March 2026 World Cup qualification	Kuwait	0–1	Oman	Kuwait City, Kuwait
21:15 UTC+3		Report	Al-Sabhi 56'	Stadium: Jaber Al-Ahmad International Stadium; Attendance: 41,322; Referee: Salman Ahmad Falahi (Qatar)

20 May Non-FIFA Friendly	Oman	4–1	Niger A	Muscat, Oman
20:00 UTC+4	Al-Sadi 25' (pen.); Al-Ghafri 45', 45+1'; Al-Ghassani 86' (pen.)	Report	Goumey 39'	Stadium: Sultan Qaboos Sports Complex; Attendance: 0

28 May Non-FIFA Friendly	Oman	1–0	Lebanon	Muscat, Oman
20:00 UTC+4	Al-Sabhi 5'	Report		Stadium: Sultan Qaboos Sports Complex; Attendance: 0 Referee: Shukri Hussain Al-Hunfush (Saudi Arabia)

5 June 2026 World Cup qualification	Oman	0–3	Jordan	Muscat, Oman
20:00 UTC+4		Report	Olwan 51', 45+7' (pen.), 64'	Stadium: Sultan Qaboos Sports Complex; Attendance: 13,878; Referee: Khalid Saleh Al-Turais (Saudi Arabia)

10 June 2026 World Cup qualification	Palestine	1–1	Oman	Amman, Jordan
20:00 UTC+4	Kharoub 49'	Report	Al-Sabhi 90+7' (pen.)	Stadium: King Abdullah II Stadium; Attendance: 8,500; Referee: Mooud Bonyadifard (Iran)

30 August 2025 CAFA Nations Cup	Uzbekistan	1–1	Oman	Tashkent, Uzbekistan
19:30 UTC+5	Erkinov 55'	Report	Al-Rawahi 4'	Stadium: Milliy Stadium; Referee: Mooud Bonyadifard (Iran)

2 September 2025 CAFA Nations Cup	Oman	2–1	Kyrgyzstan	Tashkent, Uzbekistan
17:00 UTC+5	Al-Sabhi 90+1', 90+5'	Report	Kozubayev 24'	Stadium: Pakhtakor Central Stadium; Referee: Hasan Akrami (Iran)

5 September 2025 CAFA Nations Cup	Turkmenistan	1–2	Oman	Tashkent, Uzbekistan
17:00 UTC+5	Ballakow 51'	Report	Ahallyýew 12' (o.g.); Al Ghassani 90+3'	Stadium: Pakhtakor Central Stadium; Referee: Vahid Kazemi (Iran)

8 September 2025 CAFA Nations Cup	India	1–1 (3–2 p)	Oman	Hisor, Tajikistan
17:00 UTC+5	Kumam 80'	Report	Al-Yahmadi 55'	Stadium: Hisor Central Stadium; Referee: Firdavs Norsafarov (Uzbekistan)
	Penalties
	Chhangte (penalty scored); Bheke (penalty scored); Ali (penalty missed); Jithin (penalty scored); Kumam (penalty missed)		(penalty missed) Al-Saadi; (penalty missed) Al-Kaabi; (penalty scored) Al-Rushaidi; (penalty scored) Al-Ghassani; (penalty missed) Al-Yahmadi

8 October 2026 World Cup qualification	Oman	0–0	Qatar	Al Rayyan, Qatar
18:00 UTC+3		Report		Stadium: Jassim bin Hamad Stadium; Attendance: 12,975; Referee: Yusuke Araki (Japan)

11 October 2026 World Cup qualification	United Arab Emirates	2–1	Oman	Al Rayyan, Qatar
20:15 UTC+3	Meloni 76'; Caio 83'	Report	Autonne 12' (o.g.)	Stadium: Jassim bin Hamad Stadium; Attendance: 8,817; Referee: Alireza Faghani (Australia)

14 November Friendly	Oman	2–0	Sudan	Seeb, Oman
19:00 UTC+4	Al-Aghbari 64'; Al-Alawi 79'	Report		Stadium: Al-Seeb Stadium; Referee: Mahmoud Al Sawalmeh (Jordan)

18 November Friendly	Oman	0–2	Ivory Coast	Muscat, Oman
17:00 UTC+4		Report	Bayo 9'; Krasso 25'	Stadium: Sultan Qaboos Sports Complex; Referee: Mohammed Khaled Al Hoish (Saudi Arabia)

26 November 2025 FIFA Arab Cup qualification	Oman	0–0 (4–1 p)	Somalia	Doha, Qatar
16:00 UTC+3		Report		Stadium: Abdullah Bin Khalifa Stadium; Attendance: 3,957; Referee: Juan Calderón (Costa Rica)
	Penalties
	Al-Busaidi (penalty scored); Al-Rawahi (penalty scored); Al-Yahyaei (penalty scored); Al-Ghafri (penalty scored)		(penalty missed) S. Hassan; (penalty scored) M. Omar; (penalty missed) Musse

2 December 2025 FIFA Arab Cup GS	Saudi Arabia	2–1	Oman	Al Rayyan, Qatar
20:00 UTC+3	Al-Buraikan 55'; Al-Shehri 77'	Report	Al-Habashi 70'	Stadium: Education City Stadium; Attendance: 21,628; Referee: Adham Makhadmeh (Jordan)

5 December 2025 FIFA Arab Cup GS	Oman	0–0	Morocco	Al Rayyan, Qatar
17:30 UTC+3		Report		Stadium: Education City Stadium; Attendance: 37,996; Referee: Juan Gabriel Benítez (Paraguay)

8 December 2025 FIFA Arab Cup GS	Oman	2–1	Comoros	Doha, Qatar
20:00 UTC+3	Al Sabhi 30', 43'	Report	Hamidou 68'	Stadium: Stadium 974; Attendance: 9,348; Referee: Pierre Atcho (Gabon)

=== 2026 ===
27 March 2026 FIFA Series	Oman	Cancelled	Sierra Leone	Baku, Azerbaijan
15:00 UTC+4				Stadium: Dalga Arena
Note: The match was cancelled due to Oman withdrawing following the 2026 Iran war.

5 June Friendly	Indonesia	3–0	Oman	Jakarta, Indonesia
20:00 UTC+7	Hubner 13'; Romeny 27'; Oratmangoen 56'	Report		Stadium: Gelora Bung Karno Stadium; Referee: Muhammad Taqi (Singapore)

7 June Friendly	Oman	4–1	Mozambique	Bekasi, Indonesia
20:00 UTC+7	Al-Sabhi 32', 53' (pen.), 58'; Al-Shukaili 88'	Report	Reis 60'	Stadium: Patriot Stadium

9 June Friendly	Kuwait	Cancelled	Oman	Bangkok, Thailand
19:00 UTC+7		Report		Stadium: Rajamangala Stadium

23 September 27th Arabian Gulf Cup GS	Iraq	1–1	Oman	Jeddah, Saudi Arabia
17:30 UTC+3	Qasim 6'	Report	Al-Rawahi 67'	Stadium: Prince Abdullah Al-Faisal Sports City Stadium; Referee: Omar Al-Ali (United Arab Emirates)

26 September 27th Arabian Gulf Cup GS	Oman	0–3	Saudi Arabia	Jeddah, Saudi Arabia
21:00 UTC+3		Report	Al-Buraikan 11', 34'; Kadesh 18'	Stadium: King Abdullah Sports City Stadium; Attendance: 23,186; Referee: Ammar Mahfoodh (Bahrain)

29 September 27th Arabian Gulf Cup GS	Oman	3–1	Kuwait	Jeddah, Saudi Arabia
20:30 UTC+3	Al-Rawahi 65', 81'; Al-Shaqsy 84'	Report	Al-Khaldi 6'	Stadium: Prince Abdullah Al-Faisal Sports City Stadium; Attendance: 1,184; Referee: Mohammed Ahmed Al-Shammari (Qatar)

3 October 27th Arabian Gulf Cup SF	United Arab Emirates	1–0	Oman	Jeddah, Saudi Arabia
21:30 UTC+3	Camara 22'	Report		Stadium: Prince Abdullah Al-Faisal Sports City Stadium; Attendance: 2,088; Referee: Danny Makkelie (Netherlands)

14 November 2026 King's Cup	Oman	0–1	Tajikistan	Sisaket, Thailand
16:00 UTC+7		Report	Boboev 60' (pen.)	Stadium: Sisaket Provincial Stadium; Attendance: 3,713; Referee: Songkran Bunmeekiart (Thailand)

17 November 2026 King's Cup	Oman	7–0	Brunei	Sisaket, Thailand
16:00 UTC+7	Al-Ghafri 19'; Al-Balushi 28', 45+3', 63'; Al-Aghbari 33', 53'; Hariz 90+2' (o.g.)	Report		Stadium: Sisaket Provincial Stadium; Attendance: 2,659; Referee: Alongkorn Khonwai (Thailand)
