= Anan Yodsangwal =

Thai Citizenship professional footballer

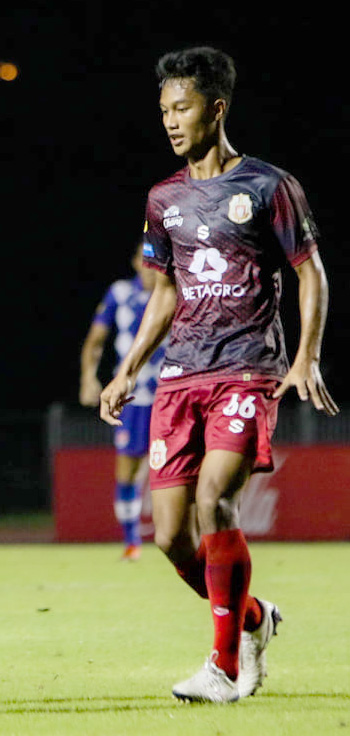
- Anan playing for Lamphun Warriors in 2022

Personal information
- Full name: Anan Yodsangwal
- Date of birth: 9 July 2001 (age 25)
- Place of birth: Bangkok, Thailand
- Height: 1.78 m (5 ft 10 in)
- Positions: Winger; forward

Team information
- Current team: Buriram United
- Number: 11

Youth career
- 2016–2019: Tharnpanya School

Senior career*
Years	Team	Apps	(Gls)
2020–2026	Lamphun Warriors	144	(29)
2026–	Buriram United	0	(0)

International career^{‡}
2022–2024	Thailand U23	6	(3)
2024–	Thailand	15	(1)
Medal record
Men's football
Representing Thailand
FIFA ASEAN Cup
Runner-up	2026 Indonesia	Team
ASEAN Championship
Runner-up	ASEAN 2024	Team
- * Club domestic league appearances and goals as of 01:17, 6 May 2026 (UTC) ‡ National team caps and goals as of 14 November 2026

Anan Yodsangwal (Thai: อนันต์ ยอดสังวาลย์; born 9 July 2001) is a Thai professional footballer who plays as a winger or a forward for Thai League 1 club Buriram United and the Thailand national team.

== International career ==
On 16 March 2022, Anan was called up to the Thailand U23 national team for the 2022 Dubai Cup U-23.

In June 2023, Anan received his first call-up to the senior team for friendly match against Chinese Taipei and Hong Kong, but did not make an appearance.

Anan made his debut on 10 September 2024 in a 2024 LPBank Cup game against Vietnam at the Mỹ Đình National Stadium.

=== International goals ===
Scores and results list Thailand's goal tally first.

No.	Date	Venue	Opponent	Score	Result	Competition
1.	14 November 2026	Sisaket Province Stadium, Sisaket, Thailand	Brunei	4–0	6–0	2026 King's Cup

== Honours ==
Lamphun Warriors

- Thai League 2: 2021–22
- Thai League 3: 2020–21

Thailand U23

- SEA Games silver medal: 2023

Thailand

- King's Cup: 2024, 2026
- FIFA ASEAN Cup runner-up: 2026

=== Individual ===
- Thai League 1 Player of the Month: February 2025
- Thai League 1 Goal of the Month: February 2025
