= William Weidersjö =

Thai footballer

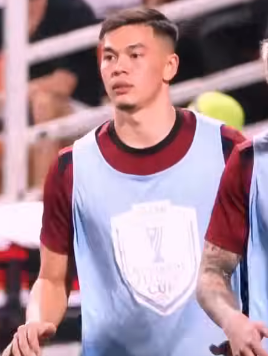
- Weidersjö in 2025

Personal information
- Full name: William Gabriel Weidersjö
- Date of birth: 10 June 2001 (age 25)
- Place of birth: Älvsjö, Sweden
- Height: 1.84 m (6 ft 0 in)
- Position: Defensive midfielder

Team information
- Current team: Uthai Thani
- Number: 8

Youth career
- –2016: Älvsjö AIK
- 2017–2019: Enskede IK
- 2019–2020: IFK Haninge
- 2020–2021: Hammarby IF

Senior career*
Years	Team	Apps	(Gls)
2017–2019	Enskede IK	2	(0)
2019	Nyköpings BIS	1	(0)
2021	Hammarby TFF	27	(0)
2022–2024	Port	23	(1)
2024	→ Uthai Thani (loan)	10	(1)
2024–	Uthai Thani	49	(3)

International career^{‡}
2022	Thailand U23	4	(2)
2024–	Thailand	13	(1)
Medal record
Men's football
Representing Thailand
SEA Games
Silver medal – second place	Hanoi 2021	Team
ASEAN Championship
Runner-up	ASEAN 2024	Team
- * Club domestic league appearances and goals as of 01:03, 19 November 2026 (UTC) ‡ National team caps and goals as of 14 November 2026

William Gabriel Weidersjö (Thai: วิลเลียม ไวเดอร์เฌอ, born 10 June 2001) is professional footballer who plays as a defensive midfielder for Thai League 1 club Uthai Thani. Born in Sweden, he plays for Thailand national team.

== Club career ==
Weidersjö played for various clubs in Sweden before coming back to Thailand to sign a contract with Thai League 1 side Port in January 2022.

== International career ==
On 16 March 2022, Weidersjö was called up to the Thailand national under-23 football team for the 2022 Dubai Cup. On 26 March 2022, he played his first international match against China PR and also scored his first international goal.

=== International goals ===
Scores and results list Thailand's goal tally first.

No.	Date	Venue	Opponent	Score	Result	Competition
1.	14 November 2026	Sisaket Province Stadium, Sisaket, Thailand	Brunei	2–0	6–0	2026 King's Cup

== Personal life ==
Weidersjö was born and raised in Sweden and is of Thai descent.

== Honours ==
Thailand U23

- Southeast Asian Games silver medal: 2021

Thailand

- King's Cup: 2024, 2026
