= Abdulaziz Al-Gheilani =

Omani footballer (born 1995)

Personal information
- Birth name: Abdulaziz Mubarak Zayid Al-Gheilani
- Date of birth: May 14, 1995 (age 31)
- Place of birth: Sur, Oman
- Height: 1.72 m (5 ft 7 1/2 in)
- Position: Right-back

Team information
- Current team: Al-Nahda
- Number: 32

Youth career
- 2009–2014: Sur SC

Senior career*
Years	Team	Apps	(Gls)
2014–2019	Sur SC		
2019–2023	Al-Seeb		
2023–	Al-Nahda		

International career
2018	Oman U23	3	(0)
2019–	Oman	18	(0)
- * Club domestic league appearances and goals

Abdulaziz Mubarak Zayid Al-Gheilani (Arabic: عَبْد الْعَزِيز مُبَارَك زَايِد الْغَيْلَانِيّ; born 14 May 1995) is an Omani professional footballer who plays as a right-back for Al-Nahda and the Oman national team.

== Career ==
Al-Gheilani is a youth product of his local club Sur SC since 2009, and began his senior career with them in the Oman Professional League in 2014. On 15 July 2019, he transferred to Al-Seeb. There, he helped them win the 2021–22 Oman Professional League, 2021–22 Sultan Qaboos Cup, 2020 and 2022 Oman Super Cup and 2022 AFC Cup, but also had an injury to his cruciate ligament that kept him off the field for the second half of 2022. On 4 July 2023, he transferred to Al-Nahda.

== International ==
Al-Gheilani was first called up to the senior Oman national team in a 2–1 2022 FIFA World Cup qualification win over India on 5 May 2019. He was called up to the national team for the 2023 AFC Asian Cup.

== Honours ==
Al-Seeb

- Oman Professional League: 2021–22
- Sultan Qaboos Cup: 2021–22
- Oman Super Cup: 2020, 2022
- AFC Cup: 2022
