= Zahir Al-Aghbari =

Omani footballer (born 1999)

Personal information
- Full name: Zahir Sulaiman Abdullah Al-Aghbari
- Date of birth: 28 May 1999 (age 27)
- Place of birth: Seeb, Oman
- Height: 1.78 m (5 ft 10 in)
- Position: Winger

Team information
- Current team: Al-Muharraq SC
- Number: 77

Youth career
- Al-Seeb Club

Senior career*
Years	Team	Apps	(Gls)
2017–2021	Al-Seeb Club		
2021	Mes Rafsanjan	8	(0)
2022–2023	Al-Khaldiya		
2023	Al-Seeb Club		
2024–	Al-Muharraq		

International career^{‡}
2019–	Oman	69	(3)
Medal record
Men's football
Representing Oman
Gulf Cup
Runner-up	2024 Kuwait
- * Club domestic league appearances and goals as of 24 August 2023 ‡ National team caps and goals as of 17 November 2026

Zahir Al-Aghbari (born 28 May 1999) is an Omani professional football player who plays as a winger for Al-Muharraq.

=== International goals ===
No.	Date	Venue	Opponent	Score	Result	Competition
1.	14 November 2025	Al-Seeb Stadium, Seeb, Oman	Sudan	1–0	2–0	Friendly
2.	17 November 2026	Sisaket Provincial Stadium, Sisaket, Thailand	Brunei	3–0	7–0	2026 King's Cup
3.	17 November 2026	Sisaket Provincial Stadium, Sisaket, Thailand	Brunei	5–0	7–0	2026 King's Cup
