= Hamad Al-Azani =

Omani footballer and manager (born 1973)

Personal information
- Full name: Hamad Khalifa Hamed Al-Azani
- Date of birth: 31 May 1973 (age 53)
- Place of birth: Al-Ain, United Arab Emirates
- Height: 1.80 m (5 ft 11 in)
- Position: Defender

Team information
- Current team: Oman U-23 (Manager)

Youth career
- 1986–1990: Al-Nahda

Senior career*
Years	Team	Apps	(Gls)
1990–2003	Al-Nahda	?	(?)

Managerial career
- 2002–2005: Al-Nahda (youth)
- 2005–2006: Oman (assistant)
- 2006: Oman (caretaker)
- 2007–2008: Oman (assistant)
- 2008: Oman (caretaker)
- 2008–2010: Al-Nahda
- 2010–2011: Oman
- 2011–2012: Oman U-23
- 2012–2014: Al-Nahda
- 2014–2015: Oman U-23
- * Club domestic league appearances and goals

Hamad Khalifa Hamed Al-Azani commonly known as Hamad Al-Azani (Arabic: حمد خليفة حامد العزاني; born 31 May 1973) is an Omani football manager and a former footballer who is currently the manager of Oman national under-23 football team.

== Managerial career ==
He has had a successful managerial career in Oman with Al-Nahda Club, Oman national football team and Oman national under-23 football team.

=== Oman national team ===
On 1 March 2006, Croatian manager Srećko Juričić was sacked by the Oman Football Association following the 1-0 loss of Oman against the hosts United Arab Emirates. Following the sacking, the Oman Football Association appointed Hamad as the interim manager of the national team.

In June 2008 after the sudden sacking of Julio César Ribas by the Oman Football Association, due to Oman's poor performance in 2010 FIFA World Cup qualification, Hamad was appointed as an interim manager of Oman national football team. He led Oman to an undefeated streak in the few months he managed the team.

In July 2008, the Oman Football Association appointed Frenchman Claude Le Roy as the manager of the national team and as a result Hamad was appointed as the assistant manager.

=== Oman Olympic team ===
On 19 January 2011, he replaced the Frenchman Sébastien Migné as the manager of the Oman national under-23 football team. He was given the charge of leading the team in the Men's Asian Qualifiers of the 2012 Summer Olympics. He led the team to a 7-2 aggregate win over Tajikistan national under-23 football team in the preliminary round 1. In the preliminary round 2, Oman again put up a great performance against China national under-23 football team defeating them on an aggregate score of 4-1. In the preliminary round 3, Oman began their campaign with a 2-0 defeat to hosts South Korea. But then Oman bounced back and won back to back matches against Saudi Arabia and Qatar 2-0 and 3-0 (awarded) respectively. On 22 February 2012, Oman faced a 0-3 home loss against South Korea national under-23 football team and hence losing all the chances of finishing at the top of the group which would have earned them a direct spot at 2012 Summer Olympics for the first time. As a result of this loss, he was shown the door and the country’s London Olympics hopes were now in the hands of the national team coach Paul Le Guen who was appointed as the manager for the Playoff Round and also the AFC–CAF play-off.

=== Back to Oman national team ===
On 28 February 2007, the Oman Association Football sacked the Czech football manager Milan Máčala as he failed to win the nation its first ever Arabian Gulf Cup in Abu Dhabi after losing 1-0 in the finals against the hosts United Arab Emirates. Hamad was once again appointed as the interim manager of the national team.

=== Back to Oman Olympic team ===
On 25 May 2014, he signed a two-years contract with the Oman Football Association to manage the Oman national under-23 football team once again after a two year hiatus. His immediate task was to prepare the team for the 2014 GCC U-23 Championship to be hosted from August 30 – September 9 in Doha, Qatar.
