= Boubakary Sadou =

Cameroonian footballer

Personal information
- Full name: Boubakary Sadou
- Date of birth: September 7, 1982 (age 44)
- Place of birth: Cameroon, Douala
- Position: Midfielder

Senior career*
Years	Team	Apps	(Gls)
2003–04	Renaissance de Meiganga	?	(?)
2004–2005	Sahel FC	?	(?)
2005–2008	APR FC	?	(?)
2008–2010	Al Ahly Tripoli	?	(?)
2010–2011	Al Nahda		

International career
2008–2010	Rwanda	7	(0)
- * Club domestic league appearances and goals

Boubakary Sadou (born September 7, 1982) is a former Cameroonian and Rwandan footballer.
