= Oman national football team =

Association football team

Oman
- Nickname(s): الأحمر, al-Aḥmar (The Reds) سامبا الخليج, Sāmbā al-Khalīj (Gulf Samba)
- Association: Oman Football Association (OFA)
- Confederation: AFC (Asia)
- Sub-confederation: WAFF (West Asia)
- Head coach: Tarik Sektioui
- Captain: Ali Al-Busaidi
- Most caps: Ahmed Kano (193)
- Top scorer: Hani Al-Dhabit (42)
- Home stadium: Sultan Qaboos Sports Complex
- FIFA code: OMA
First colours	Second colours

FIFA ranking
- Current: 82 ▼1 (18 November 2026)
- Highest: 50 (August – October 2004)
- Lowest: 129 (October 2016)

First international
- Libya 14–1 Muscat and Oman (Cairo, Egypt; 2 September 1965)

Biggest win
- Oman 14–0 Bhutan (Muscat, Oman; 28 March 2017)

Biggest defeat
- Libya 21–0 Muscat and Oman (Baghdad, Iraq, 6 April 1966)

Asian Cup
- Appearances: 6 (first in 2004)
- Best result: Round of 16 (2019)

Arab Cup
- Appearances: 3 (first in 1966)
- Best result: Quarter-finals (2021)

WAFF Championship
- Appearances: 5 (first in 2008)
- Best result: Third place (2012)

Arabian Gulf Cup
- Appearances: 25 (first in 1974)
- Best result: Champions (2009, 2017–18)

The Oman national football team (Arabic: منتخب عُمَان لِكُرَةُ الْقَدَم) represents Oman in men's international football, and is controlled by the Oman Football Association. Oman has never qualified for the FIFA World Cup, however, they have made six appearances in the AFC Asian Cup.

== History ==
=== World Cup and Asian Cup ===
The Oman national football team has made notable efforts in international competitions but has not qualified for the FIFA World Cup. Their best performance in the Asian Cup was reaching the round of 16 in 2019. The team has shown improvement over the years, and their participation in various qualifiers and tournaments reflects their growing competitiveness in regional football.

=== Gulf Cup ===
The mid-1990s under the OFA chairmanship of Sheikh Saif bin Hashil Al-Maskary saw Oman achieve positive results on the Asian stage. Former Omani captain, Hani Al-Dhabit was awarded the RSSSF 2001 World Top Scorer, with 22 goals; the most goals scored by a player who won the World Top Scorer award and being the third Arab and the first Omani to win the award.

In the 2002 Arabian Gulf Cup which was held in Saudi Arabia, Oman finished in 5th place and under the captaincy of Dhofar's Hani Al-Dhabit, Oman defeated 9-time winners Kuwait. The match had ended 3–1 with Al-Dhabit scoring a hat-trick. Hani netted a goal against Bahrain and a consolation goal in a 2–1 loss against Qatar. At the end of the tournament, Hani was the only Omani to score goals for his nation and was awarded for being the top goal scorer of the competition, with 5 goals.

In the 2004 Arabian Gulf Cup which was held in Doha, Oman reached the final for the first time in the team's history, which was eventually lost to the hosts Qatar in a penalty shootout after the goalkeeping sensation Ali Al-Habsi missed a penalty. Qatar won the match 6–5 on penalties after the match had ended 1–1 at normal time. Oman's Amad Al-Hosni was awarded the "Top Goalscorer" award of the tournament with a total of 4 goals.

In the 2007 Arabian Gulf Cup which was held in United Arab Emirates, the team reached the final for a second consecutive time and lost 1–0 to the hosts United Arab Emirates. It had maintained an undefeated record throughout the competition excluding the final. Ali Al-Habsi had received the "Best Goalkeeper of the Gulf Cup" award for the third consecutive time in a row, the most won by any goalkeeper in the 40 years of the Gulf Cup tournament. Oman had tied United Arab Emirates in goal-scoring with 9 goals each after the tournament.

After two consecutive defeats in the Gulf Cup final, Oman won the 2009 Arabian Gulf Cup tournament as hosts by defeating Saudi Arabia in a penalty shootout. Oman won the match 6–5 on penalties after the match had ended 0–0 at extra time. Oman maintained a clean-sheet throughout the tournament. The tournament in Muscat was the first for Hassan Rabia, who managed to score 4 goals, earning the "Top Goalscorer" award. Ali Al-Habsi received his fourth consecutive "Best Goalkeeper Award".

== Kit ==
The "confettied" kit provided by Thai firm Grand Sport during Oman's attempted qualification for the 1998 World Cup

The team signed a contract in 2006 with Gulf Air.

On 9 May 2012, the Oman Football Association launched the new official team kit to be worn by Oman in their push for 2014 FIFA World Cup qualification – AFC fourth round. The kit was launched together with a new OFA logo. The new kit was designed for Oman by Taj Oman, an Oman-based company. Later in June 2012, Oman's airline Oman Air became the official carrier of the Oman Football Association.

On 8 February 2014, the Omani Football Association confirmed the tie-up with Italian sports apparel manufacturer Kappa. A joint venture agreement was signed by sportswear Kappa and OFA's apparel brand Taj Oman. In a 4-year deal, Kappa will produce the kit worn by all the Oman National football teams bearing the Taj mark and will provide Oman with a range of sportswear specific for the country. The deal will see both the names (Kappa & Taj) on the kit worn by the National teams and on all retail items. Oman Air also renewed its deal on the same day with the OFA till the end of the 2013–14 season. On 16 September 2014, the Omani Football Association announced that they had signed an agreement with Asia Sports Marketing to become the exclusive sales agent for the Association.

On 9 September 2015, the Omani Football Association signed a 1-year contract extension with Oman Air as the official carrier of the team. The association said that although Oman Air's ticket allocation in the deal is primarily meant for the senior national team's tours, OFA has availed the privilege for club teams' trips to Salalah for Omantel Professional League (OPL) matches and for overseas travel of the national age-group squads. On 18 October 2015, the Omani Football Association announced a partnership with a new mental energizer Energy Drinks Partner, Effect.

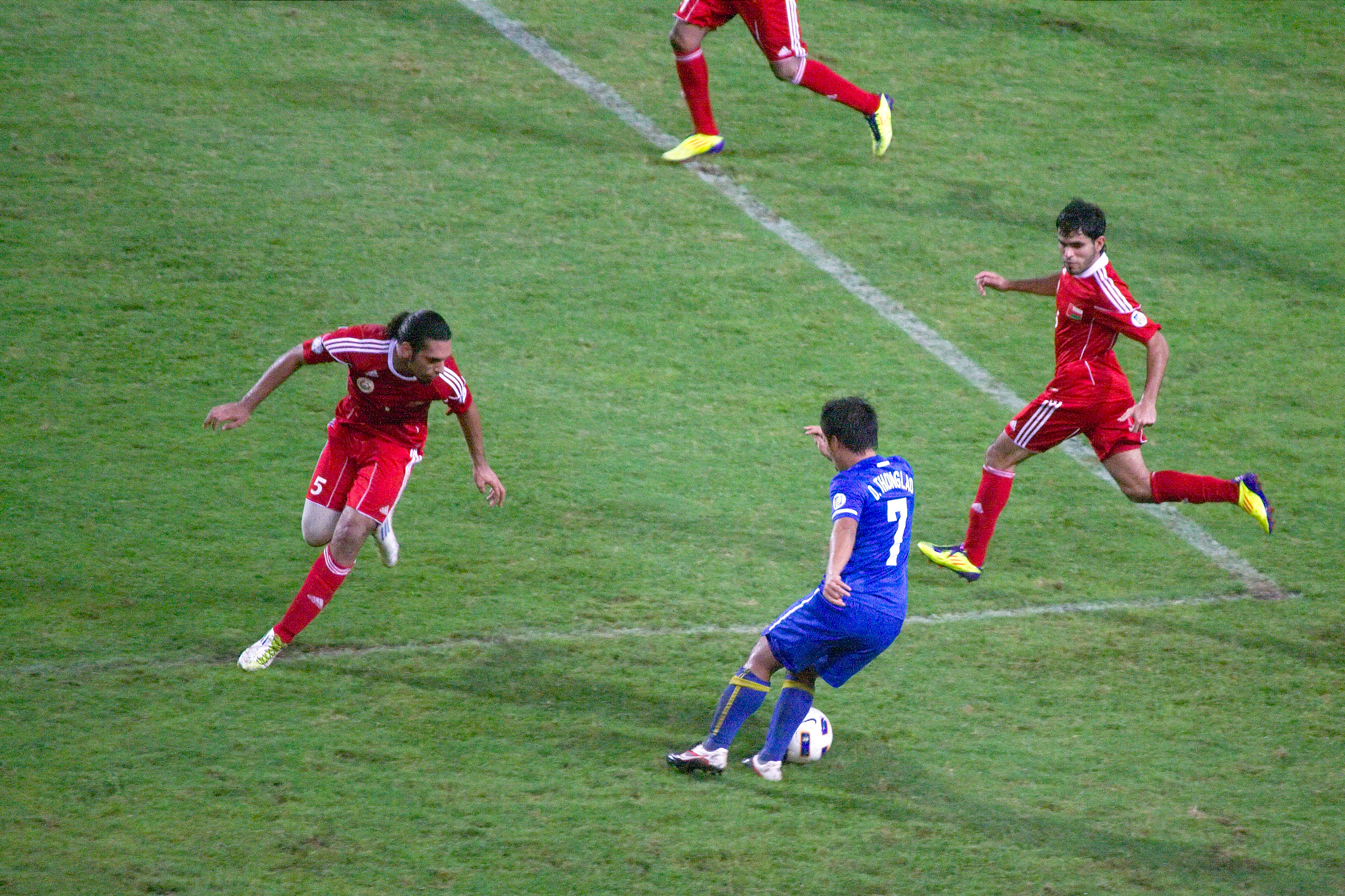
Oman in a red kit versus Thailand in a blue kit

Period	Kit Manufacturer
1978–1996	(Germany) Puma
1996–2005	(Thailand) Grand Sport
2005–2006	(United Kingdom) Umbro
2006–2008	(Italy) Lotto
2008–2012	(Germany) Adidas
2012–2014	Taj Oman
2014–2018	(Italy) Kappa
2018–2023	(Germany) Jako
2023–	(Italy) Kappa

== Results and fixtures ==
Win Draw Loss Fixture

=== 2025 ===
26 November 2025 FIFA Arab Cup qualifiers	Oman	0–0 (4–1 p)	Somalia	Doha, Qatar
16:00 UTC+3		Report		Stadium: Abdullah Bin Khalifa Stadium; Referee: Juan Calderón (Costa Rica)
	Penalties
	Al-Busaidi (penalty scored); Al-Rawahi (penalty scored); Al-Yahyaei (penalty scored); Al-Ghafri (penalty scored)		(penalty missed) S. Hassan; (penalty scored) M. Omar; (penalty missed) Musse

2 December 2025 FIFA Arab Cup GS	Saudi Arabia	2–1	Oman	Al Rayyan, Qatar
20:00 UTC+3	Al-Buraikan 55'; Al-Shehri 77'	Report	Al-Habashi 70'	Stadium: Education City Stadium; Attendance: 21,628; Referee: Adham Makhadmeh (Jordan)

5 December 2025 FIFA Arab Cup GS	Oman	0–0	Morocco	Al Rayyan, Qatar
17:30 UTC+3		Report		Stadium: Education City Stadium; Attendance: 37,996; Referee: Juan Gabriel Benítez (Paraguay)

8 December 2025 FIFA Arab Cup GS	Oman	2–1	Comoros	Doha, Qatar
20:00 UTC+3	Al Sabhi 30', 43'	Report	Hamidou 68'	Stadium: Stadium 974; Attendance: 9,348; Referee: Pierre Atcho (Gabon)

=== 2026 ===
27 March 2026 FIFA Series	Oman	Cancelled	Sierra Leone	Baku, Azerbaijan
15:00 UTC+4				Stadium: Dalga Arena
Note: The match was cancelled due to Oman withdrawing following the 2026 Iran war.

5 June Friendly	Indonesia	3–0	Oman	Jakarta, Indonesia
20:00 UTC+7	Hubner 13'; Romeny 27'; Oratmangoen 56'	Report		Stadium: Gelora Bung Karno Stadium; Referee: Muhammad Taqi (Singapore)

7 June Friendly	Oman	4–1	Mozambique	Bekasi, Indonesia
20:00 UTC+7	Al-Sabhi 32', 53' (pen.), 58'; Al-Shukaili 88'	Report	Reis 60'	Stadium: Patriot Stadium

9 June Friendly	Kuwait	Cancelled	Oman	Bangkok, Thailand
19:00 UTC+7		Report		Stadium: Rajamangala Stadium

23 September 27th Arabian Gulf Cup GS	Iraq	1–1	Oman	Jeddah, Saudi Arabia
17:30 UTC+3	Qasim 6'	Report	Al-Rawahi 67'	Stadium: Prince Abdullah Al-Faisal Sports City Stadium; Referee: Omar Al-Ali (United Arab Emirates)

26 September 27th Arabian Gulf Cup GS	Oman	0–3	Saudi Arabia	Jeddah, Saudi Arabia
21:00 UTC+3		Report	Al-Buraikan 11', 34'; Kadesh 18'	Stadium: King Abdullah Sports City Stadium; Attendance: 23,186; Referee: Ammar Mahfoodh (Bahrain)

29 September 27th Arabian Gulf Cup GS	Oman	3–1	Kuwait	Jeddah, Saudi Arabia
20:30 UTC+3	Al-Rawahi 65', 81'; Al-Shaqsy 84'	Report	Al-Khaldi 6'	Stadium: Prince Abdullah Al-Faisal Sports City Stadium; Attendance: 1,184; Referee: Mohammed Ahmed Al-Shammari (Qatar)

3 October 27th Arabian Gulf Cup SF	United Arab Emirates	1–0	Oman	Jeddah, Saudi Arabia
21:30 UTC+3	Camara 22'	Report		Stadium: Prince Abdullah Al-Faisal Sports City Stadium; Attendance: 2,088; Referee: Danny Makkelie (Netherlands)

14 November 2026 King's Cup	Oman	0–1	Tajikistan	Sisaket, Thailand
16:00 UTC+7		Report	Boboev 60' (pen.)	Stadium: Sisaket Provincial Stadium; Attendance: 3,713; Referee: Songkran Bunmeekiart (Thailand)

17 November 2026 King's Cup	Oman	7–0	Brunei	Sisaket, Thailand
16:00 UTC+7	Al-Ghafri 19'; Al-Balushi 28', 45+3', 63'; Al-Aghbari 33', 53'; Hariz 90+2' (o.g.)	Report		Stadium: Sisaket Provincial Stadium; Attendance: 2,659; Referee: Alongkorn Khonwai (Thailand)

=== 2027 ===
December 2027 Asian Cup GS	Kuwait	v	Oman	Riyadh, Saudi Arabia
--:-- UTC+3				Stadium: King Saud University Stadium

=== 2028 ===
January 2027 Asian Cup GS	Oman	v	Saudi Arabia	Riyadh, Saudi Arabia
--:-- UTC+3				Stadium: King Fahd Sports City Stadium

January 2027 Asian Cup GS	Oman	v	Palestine	Riyadh, Saudi Arabia
--:-- UTC+3				Stadium: King Saud University Stadium

== Coaching staff ==
Position	Name
Technical director	(Oman) Ahmed Al-Gharif
Head coach	(Morocco) Tarik Sektioui
Assistant coach	(Oman) Said Al Raqadi (Oman) Omar Al-Mushaifri
Goalkeeping coach	(Oman) Maqbool Al-Balushi
Fitness coach	(Oman) Talib Al-Qasmi
Match analyst	(Oman) Waleed Al-Jabri
Team manager	(Oman) Muatasim Al-Balushi
Players relations manager	(Oman) Ahmed Hadid Al-Mukhaini
Task manager	(Oman) Ahmed Al-Owaisi
Operations manager	(Oman) Kamil Al-Balushi
Photographer	(Oman) Salem Al-Muqbali
Team doctor	(Oman) Dr. Mohammed Moulou
Physiotherapist	(Oman) Said Al-Balushi
Physiotherapist	(Oman) Yaqoob Al-Mahrouqi
Masseur	(Oman) Farooq Al-Alawi
Masseur	(Oman) Ali Al-Haddad

=== Coaching history ===
Caretaker managers are listed in italics.

- (Egypt) Mohammed Al-Khafaji (1974–1976)
- (England) George Smith (1979)
- (Tunisia) Hamed El-Dhiab (1980–1982)
- (Tunisia) Mansaf El-Meliti (1982)
- (Brazil) Paulo de Oliveira (1984)
- (Brazil) Antônio Clemente (1986)
- (Brazil) Jorge Vitório (1986–1988)
- (West Germany) Karl-Heinz Heddergott (1988–1989)
- (Germany) Bernd Patzke (1990–1992)
- (Iran) Heshmat Mohajerani (1992–1994)
- (Oman) Rashid Jaber (1995–1996)
- (Egypt) Mahmoud El-Gohary (1996)
- (Slovakia) Jozef Vengloš (1996–1997)
- (Scotland) Ian Porterfield (1997)
- (Iran) Homayoun Shahrokhi (1997–1998)
- (Brazil) Valdeir Vieira (1998–1999)
- (Brazil) Carlos Alberto Torres (2000–2001)
- (Czech Republic) Milan Máčala (2001, 2003–2005, 2006–2007)
- (Germany) Bernd Stange (2001)
- (Oman) Rashid Jaber (2002)
- (Croatia) Srečko Juričić (2005–2006)
- (Oman) Hamad Al-Azani (2006)
- (Argentina) Gabriel Calderón (2007–2008)
- (Uruguay) Julio César Ribas (2008)
- (Oman) Hamad Al-Azani (2008)
- (France) Claude Le Roy (2008–2010)
- (Oman) Hamad Al-Azani (2010–2011)
- (France) Paul Le Guen (2011–2015)
- (Spain) Juan Ramón López Caro (2016)
- (Netherlands) Pim Verbeek (2016–2019)
- (Netherlands) Erwin Koeman (2019)
- (Serbia) Goran Stevanović (2020)
- (Croatia) Branko Ivanković (2020–2024)
- (Czech Republic) Jaroslav Šilhavý (2024)
- (Oman) Rashid Jaber (2024–2025)
- (Portugal) Carlos Queiroz (2025–2026)
- (Morocco) Tarik Sektioui (2026–present)

== Players ==
=== Current squad ===
The following 24 players were called up for the 2026 FIFA World Cup qualification – AFC fourth round matches against Qatar and United Arab Emirates in October 2025.

Caps and goals correct as of 18 November 2025, after the match against Ivory Coast.

No.	Pos.	Player	Date of birth (age)	Caps	Goals	Club
2	DF	Ghanim Al-Habashi	4 August 1998 (age 28)	9	0	(Oman Football Association) Al-Nahda
3	DF	Thani Al-Rushaidi	16 September 1995 (age 31)	20	0	(Oman Football Association) Al-Nahda
5	DF	Musab Al-Shaqsy	1 July 2000 (age 26)	4	0	(Oman Football Association) Al-Seeb
6	DF	Ahmed Al-Khamisi	26 November 1991 (age 34)	67	0	(Oman Football Association) Al-Seeb
13	DF	Amjad Al-Harthi	1 August 1994 (age 32)	41	1	(Oman Football Association) Al-Nahda
17	DF	Ali Al-Busaidi (captain)	21 July 1991 (age 35)	106	4	(Oman Football Association) Al-Seeb
19	DF	Mahmood Al-Mushaifri	14 May 1993 (age 33)	39	0	(Oman Football Association) Al-Shabab
4	MF	Arshad Al-Alawi	12 April 2000 (age 26)	62	8	(Oman Football Association) Al-Seeb
8	MF	Zahir Al-Aghbari	28 May 1999 (age 27)	60	1	(Oman Football Association) Al-Seeb
12	MF	Abdullah Fawaz	3 July 1996 (age 30)	63	7	(Oman Football Association) Al-Seeb
14	MF	Ahed Al-Mashaiki	30 May 2003 (age 23)	8	0	(Oman Football Association) Al-Nahda
15	MF	Nasser Al-Rawahi	26 June 2001 (age 25)	11	1	(Kuwait Football Association) Al-Qadsia
20	MF	Salaah Al-Yahyaei	17 August 1998 (age 28)	73	9	(Jordan Football Association) Al-Faisaly
23	MF	Harib Al-Saadi	23 September 1993 (age 33)	116	1	(Oman Football Association) Al-Nahda
7	FW	Issam Al-Sabhi	1 May 1997 (age 29)	67	18	(Football Association of Thailand) Port
9	FW	Mohammed Al-Ghafri	17 May 1997 (age 29)	29	4	(Oman Football Association) Al-Nahda

=== Recent call-ups ===
The following players have also been called up to the squad within the last 12 months.

Pos.	Player	Date of birth (age)	Caps	Goals	Club	Latest call-up
GK	Faiz Al-Rushaidi	19 July 1988 (age 38)	79	0	(Oman) Al-Nahda	v. Sudan, 14 November 2025
GK	Ibrahim Al-Mukhaini	20 June 1997 (age 29)	50	0	(Oman) Al-Nahda	v. Ivory Coast, 18 November 2025
GK	Bilal Al-Balushi	29 May 1996 (age 30)	2	0	(Oman) Al-Rustaq	v. Ivory Coast, 18 November 2025
GK	Ibrahim Al-Rajhi	5 October 2000 (age 26)	1	0	(Oman) Al-Nasr	v. Ivory Coast, 18 November 2025
DF	Amjad Al-Harthi	1 August 1994 (age 32)	41	1	(Oman) Al-Nahda	v. Sudan, 14 November 2025
DF	Yousuf Al-Malki	21 August 2000 (age 26)	4	0	(Oman) Al-Shabab	v. Ivory Coast, 18 November 2025
DF	Khalid Al-Ghatrifi	3 December 2002 (age 23)	0	0	(Oman) Al-Nasr	v. Ivory Coast, 18 November 2025
MF	Arshad Al-Alawi	12 April 2000 (age 26)	62	8	(Oman) Al-Seeb	v. Sudan, 14 November 2025
MF	Jameel Al-Yahmadi	27 July 1996 (age 30)	93	5	(Iraq) Al-Karma	v. Ivory Coast, 18 November 2025
MF	Musab Al-Mamari	22 January 2000 (age 26)	16	0	(Oman) Al-Shabab	v. Ivory Coast, 18 November 2025
FW	Rabia Al-Alawi	31 March 1995 (age 31)	44	9	(Jordan) Al-Wehdat	v. Ivory Coast, 18 November 2025^{PRE}

== Records ==
As of 8 December 2025
Players in bold are still active with Oman.

=== Most appearances ===
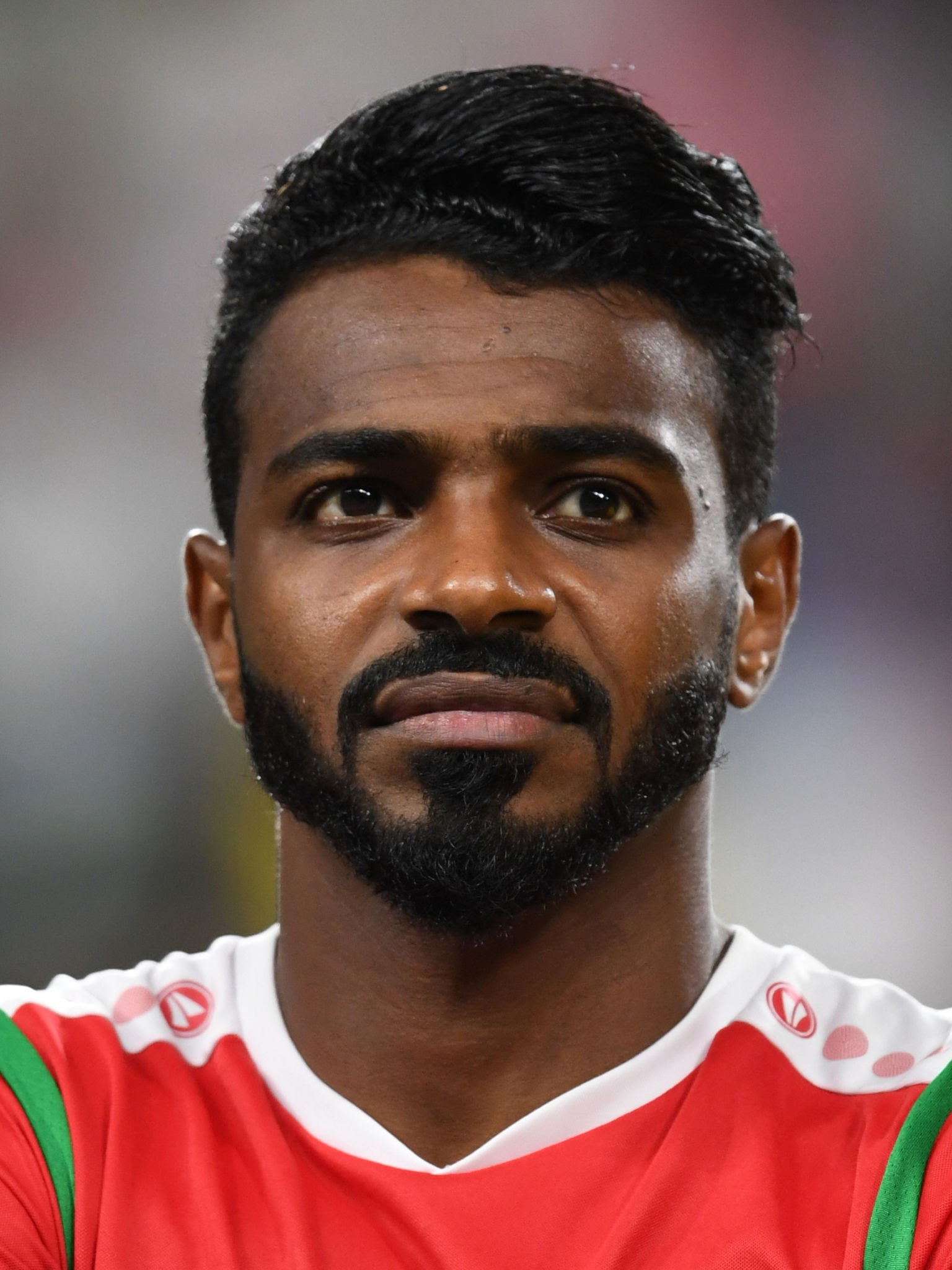
Ahmed Mubarak is Oman's most capped player with 193 appearances.

Rank	Name	Caps	Goals	Career
1	Ahmed Mubarak	193	23	2003–2019
2	Fawzi Bashir	152	30	2001–2013
3	Ali Al-Habsi	147	0	2001–2019
4	Amad Al-Hosni	134	40	2003–2015
4	Hassan Mudhafar	134	6	2003–2015
6	**Mohammed Al-Musalami**	127	3	2010–present
7	Saad Al-Mukhaini	123	1	2006–2019
8	**Harib Al-Saadi**	121	1	2016–present
9	**Ali Al-Busaidi**	110	4	2013–present
10	Ahmed Hadid	107	9	2003–2013

=== Top goalscorers ===
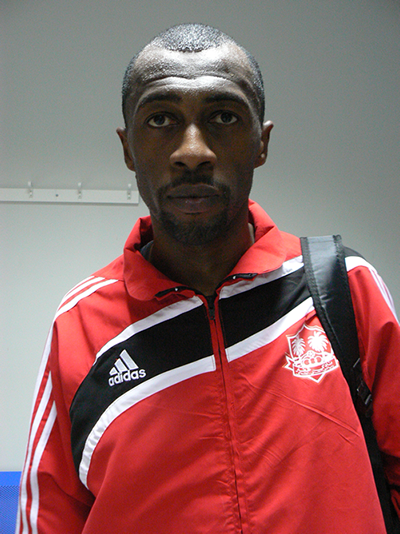
Hani Al-Dhabit is Oman's top scorer with 42 goals.

Rank	Name	Goals	Caps	Average	Career
1	Hani Al-Dhabit	42	100	0.42	1997–2014
2	Amad Al-Hosni	40	134	0.3	2003–2015
3	Abdulaziz Al-Muqbali	34	100	0.34	2011–2021
4	Fawzi Bashir	30	152	0.2	2000–2013
5	Ahmed Mubarak	23	193	0.12	2003–2019
6	**Issam Al-Sabhi**	21	72	0.29	2019–present
7	Khalid Al-Hajri	18	45	0.4	2017–2022
7	Hashim Saleh	18	82	0.22	2001–2010
9	Hassan Rabia	17	52	0.33	2008–2013
9	**Muhsen Al-Ghassani**	17	74	0.23	2017–present

== Competitive record ==
=== FIFA World Cup ===
FIFA World Cup record										Qualification record					
Year	Round	Position	Pld	W	D	L	GF	GA	Squad	Pld	W	D	L	GF	GA
(Uruguay) 1930 to (Argentina) 1978	Not a FIFA member									Not a FIFA member					
(Spain) 1982	Did not enter									Did not enter					
(Mexico) 1986	Withdrew									Withdrew					
(Italy) 1990	Did not qualify									6	0	2	4	2	11
(United States) 1994	Did not qualify									6	2	2	2	10	5
(France) 1998	Did not qualify									6	4	1	1	14	2
(South Korea) (Japan) 2002	Did not qualify									14	6	4	4	40	19
(Germany) 2006	Did not qualify									6	3	1	2	14	3
(South Africa) 2010	Did not qualify									8	4	2	2	9	7
(Brazil) 2014	Did not qualify									16	6	5	5	15	16
(Russia) 2018	Did not qualify									8	4	2	2	11	7
(Qatar) 2022	Did not qualify									18	10	2	6	27	16
(Canada) (Mexico) (United States) 2026	Did not qualify									18	7	4	7	21	18
(Morocco) (Portugal) (Spain) 2030	To be determined									To be determined					
(Saudi Arabia) 2034	To be determined									To be determined					
Total		0/11								106	46	25	35	163	104

=== AFC Asian Cup ===
AFC Asian Cup record										Qualification record					
Year	Round	Position	Pld	W	D	L	GF	GA	Squad	Pld	W	D	L	GF	GA
(British Hong Kong) 1956 to (Kuwait) 1980	Not an AFC member									Not an AFC member					
(Singapore) 1984	Did not qualify									4	1	1	2	9	15
(Qatar) 1988	Withdrew									Withdrew					
(Japan) 1992	Did not qualify									2	0	0	2	0	5
(United Arab Emirates) 1996	Did not qualify									6	4	0	2	23	5
(Lebanon) 2000	Did not qualify									3	1	0	2	4	4
(China) 2004	Group stage	9th	3	1	1	1	4	3	Squad	6	5	0	1	24	2
(Indonesia) (Malaysia) (Thailand) (Vietnam) 2007	Group stage	15th	3	0	2	1	1	3	Squad	6	4	0	2	14	6
(Qatar) 2011	Did not qualify									6	2	2	2	4	4
(Australia) 2015	Group stage	12th	3	1	0	2	1	5	Squad	6	4	2	0	7	1
(United Arab Emirates) 2019	Round of 16	16th	4	1	0	3	4	6	Squad	14	9	2	3	39	12
(Qatar) 2023	Group stage	17th	3	0	2	1	2	3	Squad	8	6	0	2	16	6
(Saudi Arabia) 2027	Qualified									6	4	1	1	11	2
Total	Round of 16	6/12	16	3	5	8	12	20		67	40	8	19	151	62

=== Arab Cup ===
FIFA Arab Cup record
Year	Round	Position	Pld	W	D	L	GF	GA
1963–1964	Did not enter							
(Iraq) 1966	Group stage	10th	1	0	0	1	1	21
1985–1992	Did not enter							
(Qatar) 1998	Withdrew							
2002–2012	Did not enter							
(Qatar) 2021	Quarter-finals	8th	4	1	1	2	6	5
(Qatar) 2025	Group stage	10th	3	1	1	1	3	3
Total	Quarter-finals	3/11	8	2	2	4	10	29

=== Arabian Gulf Cup ===
Arabian Gulf Cup record
Year	Round	Position	Pld	W	D	L	GF	GA	Squad
(Bahrain) 1970	Did not enter								
(Saudi Arabia) 1972	Did not enter								
(Kuwait) 1974	Group stage	6th	2	0	0	2	0	9	Squad
(Qatar) 1976	Seventh place	7th	6	0	1	5	3	21	Squad
(Iraq) 1979	Seventh place	7th	6	0	0	6	1	21	Squad
(United Arab Emirates) 1982	Sixth place	6th	5	0	0	5	2	15	Squad
(Oman) 1984	Seventh place	7th	6	0	2	4	3	9	Squad
(Bahrain) 1986	Seventh place	7th	6	0	1	5	4	11	Squad
(Saudi Arabia) 1988	Seventh place	7th	6	1	1	4	3	9	Squad
(Kuwait) 1990	Fourth place	4th	4	0	3	1	4	6	Squad
(Qatar) 1992	Sixth place	6th	5	0	0	5	1	10	Squad
(United Arab Emirates) 1994	Sixth place	6th	5	0	2	3	4	9	Squad
(Oman) 1996	Sixth place	6th	5	0	2	3	2	7	Squad
(Bahrain) 1998	Fourth place	4th	5	1	1	3	6	12	Squad
(Saudi Arabia) 2002	Fifth place	5th	5	1	1	3	5	7	Squad
(Kuwait) 2003–04	Fourth place	4th	6	2	2	2	6	4	Squad
(Qatar) 2004	Runners-up	2nd	5	3	1	1	10	7	Squad
(United Arab Emirates) 2007	Runners-up	2nd	5	4	0	1	7	4	Squad
(Oman) 2009	Champions	1st	5	3	2	0	7	0	Squad
(Yemen) 2010	Group stage	6th	3	0	3	0	1	1	Squad
(Bahrain) 2013	Group stage	7th	3	0	1	2	1	4	Squad
(Saudi Arabia) 2014	Fourth place	4th	5	1	2	2	7	5	Squad
(Kuwait) 2017–18	Champions	1st	5	3	1	1	4	1	Squad
(Qatar) 2019	Group stage	5th	3	1	1	1	3	4	Squad
(Iraq) 2023	Runners-up	2nd	5	3	1	1	8	6	Squad
(Kuwait) 2024–25	Runners-up	2nd	3	1	2	1	4	3	Squad
(Saudi Arabia) 2026	Semi-finals	4th	4	1	1	2	4	6	Squad
Total	2 Titles	25/27	115	24	30	61	95	186	—

=== WAFF Championship ===
WAFF Championship record
Year	Round	Pld	W	D	L	GF	GA
(Jordan) 2000	Not a WAFF Member						
(Syria) 2002	Not a WAFF Member						
(Iran) 2004	Not a WAFF Member						
(Jordan) 2007	Not a WAFF Member						
(Iran) 2008	Group stage	2	0	0	2	2	5
(Jordan) 2010	Group stage	2	0	1	1	2	4
(Kuwait) 2012	Third place	5	3	0	2	5	4
(Qatar) 2014	Group stage	2	0	2	0	0	0
(Iraq) 2019	Did not enter						
(Oman) 2026	Qualified						
Total	Third place	11	3	3	5	9	13

=== CAFA Nations Cup ===
CAFA Nations Cup record (Note: Not a CAFA member, participated as invitee.)
Year	Round	Pld	W	D	L	GF	GA
(Kyrgyzstan) (Uzbekistan) 2023	Third place	4	2	1	1	4	4
(Tajikistan) (Uzbekistan) 2025	Fourth place	4	2	2	0	6	4
Total	Third place	8	4	3	1	10	8

=== Asian Games ===
Asian Games record
Year	Round	Position	Pld	W	D	L	GF	GA
1951–1978	Did not enter							
(India) 1982	Withdrew							
1986–1990	Did not enter							
(Japan) 1994	Group stage	11th	3	1	1	1	4	4
(Thailand) 1998	Group stage	11th	5	2	1	2	14	13
2002–present	See Oman national under-23 football team							
Total	Group stage	11th	8	3	2	3	18	17

=== Arab Games ===
Arab Games record
Year	Round	Position	Pld	W	D	L	GF	GA
1953–1961	Did not enter							
(United Arab Emirates) 1965	Group stage	10th	4	0	0	4	2	45
1976–1985	Did not enter							
(Lebanon) 1997	Group stage	7th	3	0	2	1	4	6
(Jordan) 1999	Group stage	8th	4	0	2	2	2	7
(Egypt) 2007	Did not enter							
(Qatar) 2011	Group stage	9th	2	0	1	1	0	2
Total			13	0	5	8	8	60

== Head-to-head record ==
Updated on 3 October after match against United Arab Emirates.

More wins than losses As many wins as losses Fewer wins than losses

Opponent	Pld	W	D	L	GF	GA	GD
Afghanistan	4	4	0	0	12	1	+11
Algeria	3	0	0	3	1	6	−5
Australia	11	1	4	6	8	23	−15
Azerbaijan	2	2	0	0	3	0	+3
Bahrain	46	15	17	14	45	51	−6
Bangladesh	3	3	0	0	10	2	+8
Belarus	2	1	0	1	2	4	−2
Benin	1	1	0	0	2	0	+2
Bhutan	2	2	0	0	18	2	+16
Bosnia and Herzegovina	1	0	0	1	1	2	−1
Brazil	1	0	0	1	0	2	−2
Burkina Faso	3	2	1	0	6	2	+4
Bulgaria	1	0	1	0	1	1	0
Chile	1	0	0	1	0	1	−1
China	9	4	1	4	11	15	−4
Chinese Taipei	4	4	0	0	15	2	+13
Comoros	1	1	0	0	2	1	+1
Costa Rica	1	0	0	1	3	4	−1
DR Congo	1	0	1	0	2	2	0
Ecuador	3	1	1	1	2	2	0
Egypt	2	0	1	1	1	2	−1
Estonia	2	1	0	1	4	3	+1
Finland	6	0	3	3	2	7	−5
Gabon	1	1	0	0	1	0	+1
Germany	2	0	0	2	0	3	−3
Guam	2	1	1	0	1	0	+1
Haiti	1	1	0	0	3	0	+3
Hong Kong	1	1	0	0	6	0	+6
India	11	7	4	0	24	7	+17
Indonesia	6	3	1	2	6	8	–2
Iran	13	2	4	7	15	26	−11
Ivory Coast	1	0	0	1	0	2	−2
Iraq	32	6	11	15	26	52	−26
Japan	14	1	3	10	5	21	−16
Jordan	28	4	9	15	15	41	−26
Kazakhstan	1	0	0	1	1	3	−2
Kenya	5	2	3	0	8	5	+3
Kosovo	1	0	0	1	0	1	−1
Kuwait	32	10	10	12	31	47	−16
Kyrgyzstan	7	4	2	1	10	4	+6
Laos	2	2	0	0	19	0	+19
Latvia	2	1	0	1	4	4	0
Lebanon	14	6	5	3	15	12	+3
Liberia	1	1	0	0	1	0	+1
Libya	3	0	1	2	3	38	−35
Macau	2	2	0	0	6	0	+6
North Macedonia	1	1	0	0	2	0	+2
Maldives	9	9	0	0	26	3	+23
Mali	2	1	1	0	2	1	+1
Malaysia	9	6	1	2	17	6	+11
Mauritania	1	0	1	0	0	0	0
Morocco	2	0	2	0	0	0	0
Mozambique	2	1	0	1	4	3	+1
Myanmar	3	3	0	0	7	0	+7
Nepal	13	13	0	0	52	3	+49
New Zealand	7	1	2	4	4	7	−3
North Korea	2	1	1	0	4	3	+1
Norway	1	0	0	1	1	2	−1
Palestine	5	4	0	1	7	4	+3
Pakistan	4	3	1	0	12	2	+10
Paraguay	1	0	0	1	0	1	−1
Philippines	3	2	1	0	10	1	+9
Qatar	37	6	11	20	31	64	−33
Republic of Ireland	3	0	0	3	1	10	−9
Saudi Arabia	28	3	5	20	14	51	−37
Senegal	4	3	0	1	5	2	+3
Singapore	11	8	2	1	26	7	+19
Slovenia	2	0	0	2	0	11	−11
South Korea	8	1	2	5	6	14	−8
Somalia	2	1	1	0	3	2	+1
Sri Lanka	3	2	1	0	14	1	+13
Sudan	8	2	3	3	8	20	−12
Sweden	1	0	0	1	0	1	−1
Switzerland	2	0	0	2	2	6	−4
Syria	26	9	8	9	28	39	−11
Tajikistan	7	4	2	1	15	9	+6
Thailand	13	6	2	5	10	11	−1
Togo	1	0	0	1	0	1	−1
Tunisia	2	1	1	1	3	3	0
Turkmenistan	7	6	0	1	14	6	+8
United Arab Emirates	35	7	12	16	25	46	−21
United States	1	0	0	1	0	4	−4
Uruguay	1	0	0	1	0	3	−3
Uzbekistan	8	4	1	3	10	13	−3
Vietnam	4	4	0	0	12	1	+11
Yemen	12	9	2	1	22	7	+15
Zambia	3	1	2	0	3	1	+2
Zimbabwe	1	1	0	0	3	2	+1
Total	579	217	149	214	739	760	−21

== Honours ==
=== Regional ===
- Arabian Gulf Cup
  - (gold) Champions (2): 2009, 2017–18
  - (silver) Runners-up (4): 2004, 2007, 2023, 2024–25
- WAFF Championship
  - (bronze) Third Place (1): 2012

=== Awards ===
- Arabian Gulf Cup Fair Play Award (1): 2014
