= Mohammed Al-Ghafri =

Omani footballer (born 1997)

Personal information
- Full name: Mohammed Mubarak Hamood Mubarak Al-Ghafri
- Date of birth: 17 May 1997 (age 29)
- Place of birth: Al-Rustaq, Oman
- Height: 1.75 m (5 ft 9 in)
- Position: Forward

Team information
- Current team: Al-Nahda

Senior career*
Years	Team	Apps	(Gls)
2017–2023	Al-Rustaq SC		
2024	Oman Club	11	(8)
2024–	Al-Nahda	10	(1)

International career^{‡}
2019–	Oman	30	(3)
- * Club domestic league appearances and goals as of 8 September 2025 (UTC) ‡ National team caps and goals as of 17 November 2026

Mohammed Mubarak Hamood Mubarak Al-Ghafri (born 17 May 1997) is an Omani professional footballer who plays as a forward for Al-Nahda and the Omani national team.

== International career ==
He debuted internationally on 5 September 2019 at the 2022 FIFA World Cup qualifying match against India in their 2–1 win.

On 15 June 2021, Al-Ghafri scored his first goal for Oman against Bangladesh in a World Cup qualifying match in a 3–0 victory.

=== International goals ===
No.	Date	Venue	Opponent	Score	Result	Competition
1.	15 June 2021	Jassim bin Hamad Stadium, Doha, Qatar	Bangladesh	1–0	3–0	2022 FIFA World Cup qualification
2.	26 March 2024	Bukit Jalil National Stadium, Kuala Lumpur, Malaysia	Malaysia	2–0	2–0	2026 FIFA World Cup qualification
3.	17 November 2026	Sisaket Provincial Stadium, Sisaket, Thailand	Brunei	1–0	7–0	2026 King's Cup
