= 2026 King's Cup =

ฟุตบอลชิงถ้วยพระราชทานคิงส์คัพ 2026

Tournament details
- Host country: Thailand
- Dates: 14–17 November
- Teams: 4 (from 1 confederation)
- Venue: 1 (in 1 host city)

Final positions
- Champions: Thailand (17th title)
- Runners-up: Tajikistan
- Third place: Oman
- Fourth place: Brunei

Tournament statistics
- Matches played: 4
- Goals scored: 17 (4.25 per match)
- Attendance: 38,117 (9,529 per match)
- Top scorer(s): (Thailand) Yotsakorn Burapha (Oman) Abdul Majeed Al-Balushi (3 goals each)

The 2026 Annual King's Cup Football Tournament (Thai: ฟุตบอลชิงถ้วยพระราชทานคิงส์คัพ 2026) was the 52nd edition of the King's Cup football tournament organized by the Football Association of Thailand.

As hosts, Thailand participate automatically in the tournament.

During the tournament semi-final, large swarms of insects descended onto the stadium, presenting a large problem for the players. The President of the Sports Association of Sisaket has requested help from local authorities in removing the insects.

== Participating teams ==
The following teams will participate in the tournament:

Country	Association	Sub-confederation	FIFA Ranking^{1}	Previous best performance
Thailand (hosts)	FAT	AFF	93	Champions (16 titles; last title: 2024)
Oman	OFA	WAFF	81	Fourth place (2005)
Brunei	FABD	AFF	196	First Stage (1980)
Tajikistan	TFF	CAFA	100	Champions (2022)

- ^{1} FIFA Ranking as of 16 October 2026.

== Venue ==
Sisaket
Sisaket Province Stadium
Capacity: 12,000
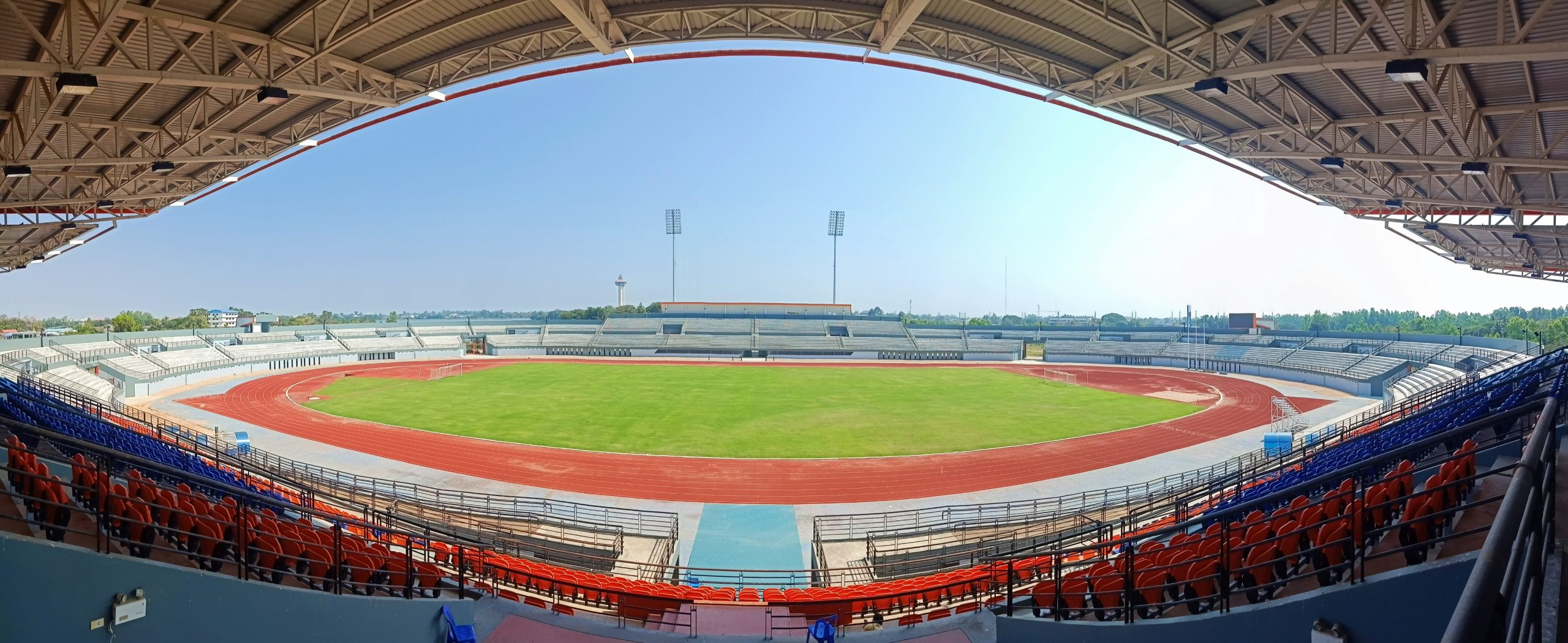

== Competition rules ==
- 90 minutes
- Penalty shootout Draw in 90 minutes, no extra time
- Substitute up to 5 players
- VAR available for all matches

== Knockout stage ==
=== Bracket ===
Semi-finals
14 November – Sisaket
Oman	0
Tajikistan	1
14 November – Sisaket
Thailand	6
Brunei	0

Final
17 November – Sisaket
Tajikistan	0
Thailand	3
Third place
17 November – Sisaket
Oman	7
Brunei	0

=== Semi-finals ===
14 November 2026
16:00 UTC+7

Oman	0–1	Tajikistan
	Report	Boboev 60' (pen.)

Sisaket Province Stadium, Sisaket
Attendance: 3,713
Referee: Songkran Bunmeekiart (Thailand)
14 November 2026
19:30 UTC+7

Thailand	6–0	Brunei
Ishyra 3' (o.g.); Yotsakorn 60', 74', 80'; Weidersjö 50'; Anan 67'	Report

Sisaket Provincial Stadium, Sisaket
Attendance: 14,319
Referee: Koki Nagamine (Japan)

=== Third place play-off ===
17 November 2026
16:00 UTC+7

Oman	7–0	Brunei
Al-Ghafri 19'; Al-Balushi 28', 45+3', 63'; Al-Aghbari 33', 53'; Hariz 90+2' (o.g.)	Report

Sisaket Province Stadium, Sisaket
Attendance: 2,659
Referee: Alongkorn Khonwai (Thailand)

=== Final ===
17 November 2026
19:30 UTC+7

Tajikistan	0–3	Thailand
	Report	Supachok 40'; Teerasak 49', 75'

Sisaket Province Stadium, Sisaket
Attendance: 17,426
Referee: Koji Takasaki (Japan)
