= Jelaiah =

Jelaiah جليعة
- District
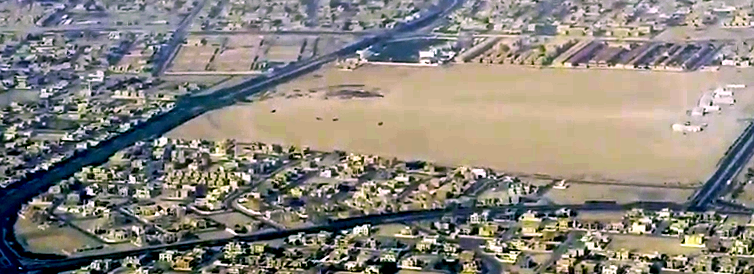
- Aerial view of Jelaiah, looking west

- Location within Doha Location within Qatar
- Coordinates: 25.3522°N 51.4861°E
- Country: Qatar
- Municipality: Doha
- Zone: Zone 68
- District no.: 108

Area
  - Total: 2.0 km^{2} (0.77 sq mi)

Jelaiah (Arabic: جليعة, romanized: Julay‘ah) is a district in Qatar, located in the municipality of Doha. Together with Al Tarfa and Jeryan Nejaima, it makes up Zone 68 which has a total population of 5,521 as of 2015.

The district hosts the Canadian Veterinary Hospital Doha and has hosted the Embassy of the Philippines in Doha since January 2013.

== Etymology ==
In local dialect, jelaiah is the pronunciation of the Arabic word qelaia, which itself is derived from qalaa, which translates to "fort". This name was bestowed on the district in honor of a small fort that is found in the area.

== Gallery ==
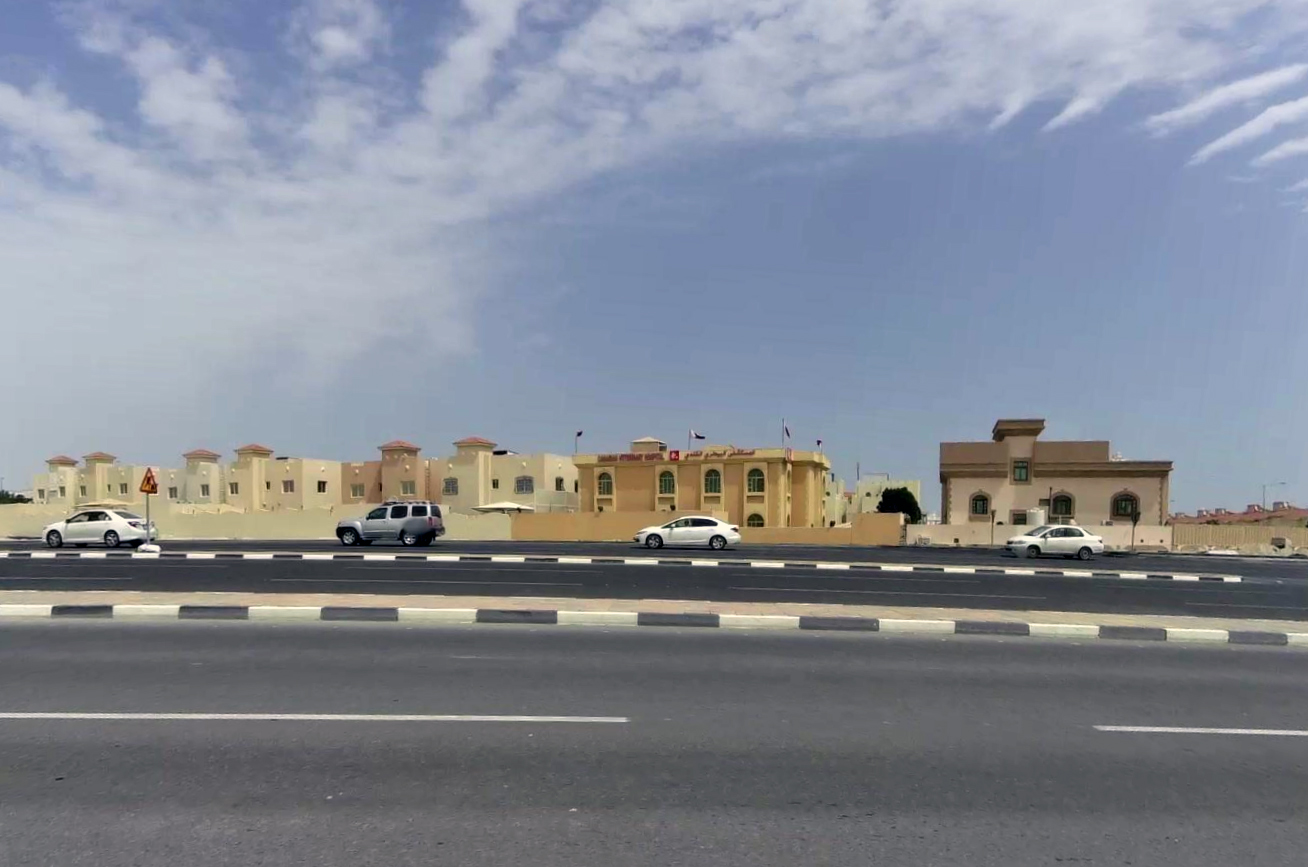
Canadian Veterinary Hospital in Jelaiah.

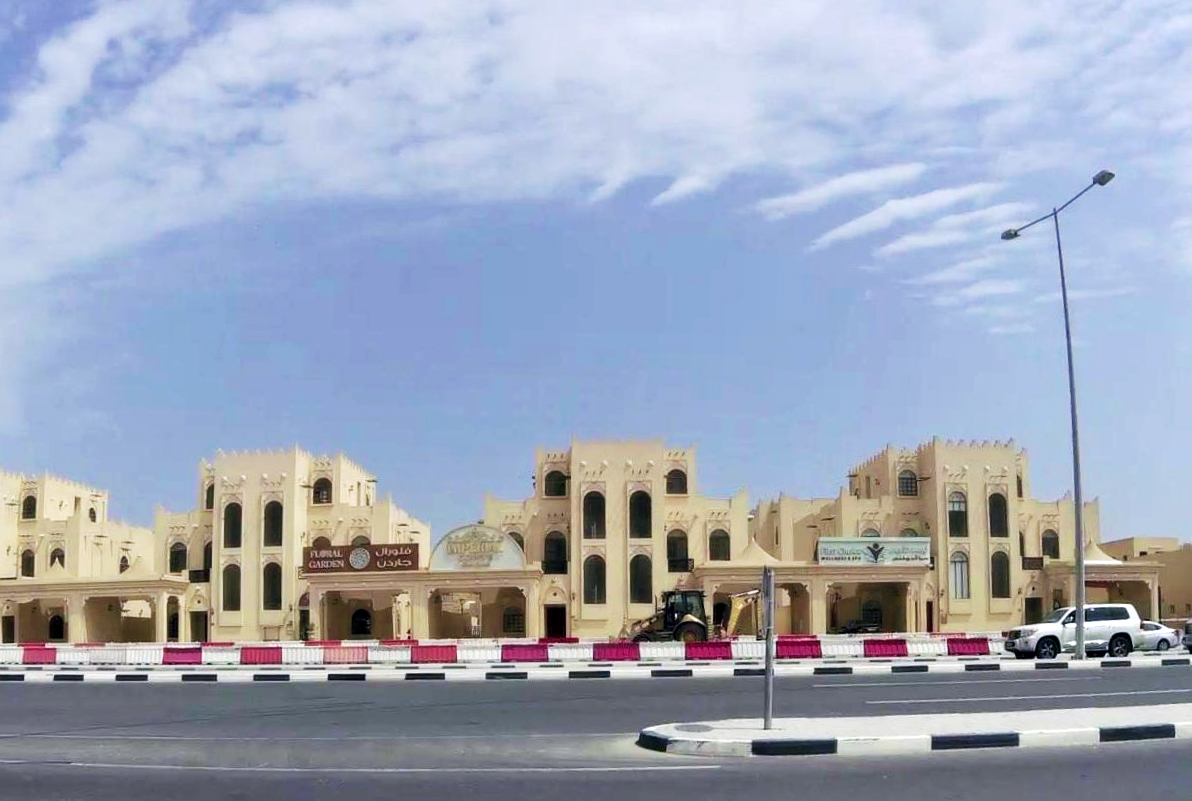
Shops in Jelaiah near Lejzaira Street.
