= Jeryan Nejaima =

Jeryan Nejaima جريان نجيمة
- District
- Location within Doha Location within Qatar
- Coordinates: 25.3740°N 51.4756°E
- Country: Qatar
- Municipality: Doha
- Zone: Zone 68
- District no.: 109

Area
  - Total: 1.3 km^{2} (0.50 sq mi)

Jeryan Nejaima (Arabic: جريان نجيمة, romanized: Jiryān Nijaīmah) is a district in Qatar, located in the municipality of Doha. It is primarily a residential district containing many villas.

Together with Al Tarfa and Jelaiah, it makes up Zone 68, which has a total population of 5,521 as of 2015. Jeryan Nejaima Street separates it from Al Tarfa to the east.

== Landmarks ==
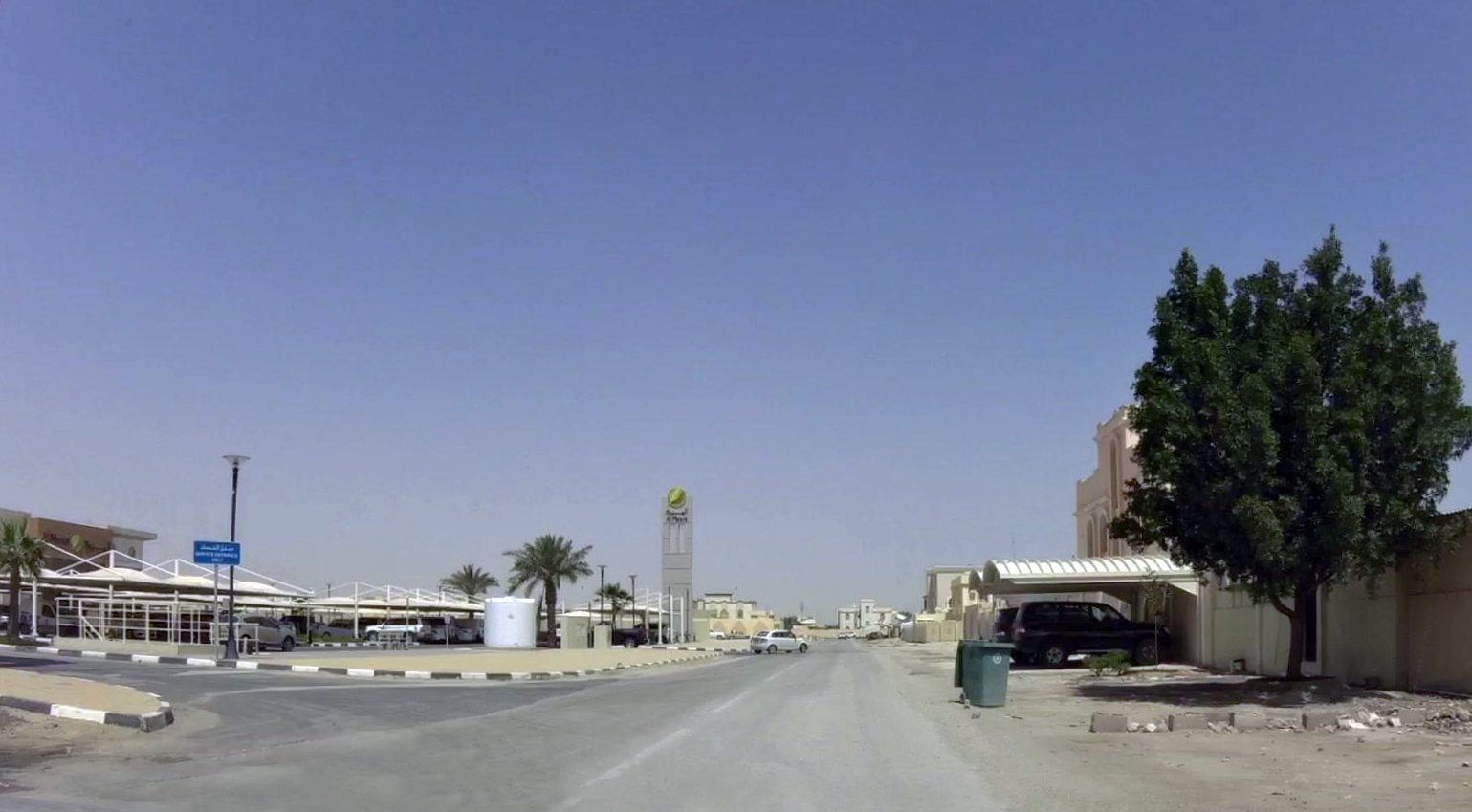
Al Meera Supercenter on Al Dehailiyat Street

- Al Furjan Market on Saha 363 Street.
- Al Furjan Market on Saha 254 Street.
- Al Furjan Market on Saha 259 Street.
- Al Furjan Market on Saha 245 Street.
- Al Furjan Market on Saha 241 Street.
- Jeryan Nejaima Park on Saha 261 Street.
- Al Meera Supercenter on Al Dehailiyat Street.

== Gallery ==
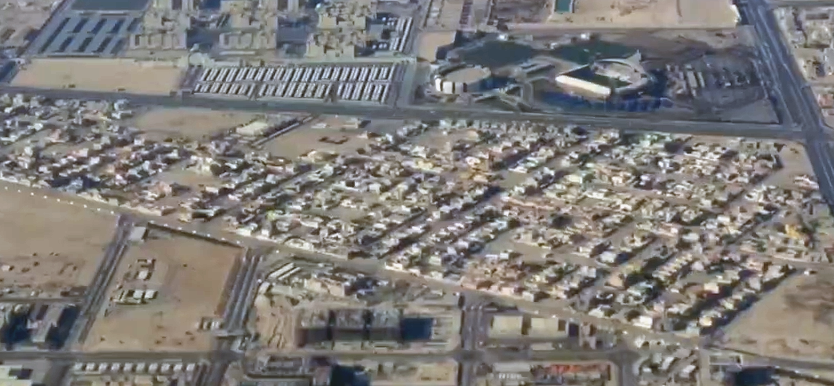
Aerial view of Jeryan Nejaima, looking west. The neighborhood is separated from Duhail at the top of the picture by Street 245, while the angled Jeryan Nejaima Street delineates it from Al Tarfa.
