= Issam Al-Sabhi =

Omani footballer (born 1997)

Personal information
- Full name: Issam Abdallah Saif Al-Sabhi
- Date of birth: 1 May 1997 (age 29)
- Place of birth: Muscat, Oman
- Height: 1.83 m (6 ft 0 in)
- Position: Forward

Team information
- Current team: Port

Senior career*
Years	Team	Apps	(Gls)
2017–2019	Al-Shabab		
2019–2020	Al-Rustaq		
2020–2022	Suwaiq		
2022	Al-Okhdood		
2022–2023	Suwaiq		
2023–2024	Al-Nahda	18	(5)
2024	Al-Shabab	10	(2)
2025–2026	Al-Quwa Al-Jawiya	57	(22)
2026–	Port	13	(5)

International career^{‡}
2019–	Oman	73	(24)
Medal record
Men's football
Representing Oman
Gulf Cup
Runner-up	2024 Kuwait
- * Club domestic league appearances and goals as of 2 June 2026 ‡ National team caps and goals as of 27 June 2026

Issam Abdallah Saif Al-Sabhi (Arabic: عصام عبد الله الصبحي; born 1 May 1997) is an Omani professional footballer who plays as a striker for Thai League 1 club Port and the Oman national team.

== Club career ==
Al-Sabhi began his career with Al-Shabab's youth teams. Al-Shabab finished as runners-up and won the Professional Cup in 2017/18 before being relegated after finishing twelfth in 2018/19.

On 2 February 2022, Al-Sabhi joined Saudi Arabian club Al-Okhdood. On 1 August 2022, Al-Sabhi rejoined former club Suwaiq, finishing the season as runners-up to Al-Nahda.

On 22 July 2023, Al-Sabhi moved to 2022/23 League and Cup champions Al-Nahda.

On 22 July 2026, Al Sabhi signed with Port F.C., marking his first goal for the club on 26 July 2026 against PSMS Medan during the 2026 Piala Presiden.

== International career ==
Al-Sabhi began his international career with the U-23 team, before he debuted internationally on 10 October 2019 during a 2022 FIFA World Cup qualifier against Afghanistan in a 3–0 victory.

On 2 September 2021, Al-Sabhi scored his first goal for Oman against Japan in a 0–1 victory during World Cup qualifying.

== Career statistics ==
=== International goals ===
Scores and results list Oman's goal tally first.

No	Date	Venue	Opponent	Score	Result	Competition
1.	2 September 2021	Panasonic Stadium Suita, Suita, Japan	Japan	1–0	1–0	2022 FIFA World Cup qualification
2.	26 September 2021	Qatar University Stadium, Doha, Qatar	Nepal	3–1	7–2	Friendly
3.	12 October 2021	Sultan Qaboos Sports Complex, Muscat, Oman	Vietnam	1–1	3–1	2022 FIFA World Cup qualification
4.	3 June 2022	Suheim bin Hamad Stadium, Doha, Qatar	Nepal	2–0	2–0	Friendly
5.	20 November 2022	Khalifa bin Zayed Stadium, Al Ain, United Arab Emirates	Belarus	2–0	2–0	Friendly
6.	23 December 2022	Maktoum bin Rashid Al Maktoum Stadium, Dubai, United Arab Emirates	Syria	1–0	2–1	Friendly
7.	9 January 2023	Basra International Stadium, Basra, Iraq	Yemen	3–2	3–2	25th Arabian Gulf Cup
8.	27 March 2023	Sultan Qaboos Sports Complex, Muscat, Oman	Lebanon	1–0	2–0	Friendly
9.	27 March 2023	Sultan Qaboos Sports Complex, Muscat, Oman	Lebanon	2–0	2–0	Friendly
10.	17 June 2023	Pakhtakor Central Stadium, Tashkent, Uzbekistan	Turkmenistan	2–0	2–0	2023 CAFA Nations Cup
11.	21 March 2024	Sultan Qaboos Sports Complex, Muscat, Oman	Malaysia	1–0	2–0	2026 FIFA World Cup qualification
12.	21 December 2024	Jaber Al-Ahmad International Stadium, Kuwait City, Kuwait	Kuwait	1–1	1–1	26th Arabian Gulf Cup
13.	24 December 2024	Sulaibikhat Stadium, Sulaibikhat, Kuwait	Qatar	1–1	2–1	26th Arabian Gulf Cup
14.	24 December 2024	Sulaibikhat Stadium, Sulaibikhat, Kuwait	Qatar	2–1	2–1	26th Arabian Gulf Cup
15.	25 March 2025	Jaber Al-Ahmad International Stadium, Kuwait City, Kuwait	Kuwait	1–0	1–0	2026 FIFA World Cup qualification
16.	28 May 2025	Sultan Qaboos Sports Complex, Muscat, Oman	Lebanon	1–0	1–0	Friendly
17.	10 June 2025	King Abdullah II Stadium, Amman, Jordan	Palestine	1–1	1–1	2026 FIFA World Cup qualification
18.	2 September 2025	JAR Stadium, Tashkent, Uzbekistan	Kyrgyzstan	1–1	2–1	2025 CAFA Nations Cup
19.	2 September 2025	JAR Stadium, Tashkent, Uzbekistan	Kyrgyzstan	2–1	2–1	2025 CAFA Nations Cup
20.	8 December 2025	Stadium 974, Doha, Qatar	Comoros	1–0	2–1	2025 FIFA Arab Cup
21.	8 December 2025	Stadium 974, Doha, Qatar	Comoros	2–0	2–1	2025 FIFA Arab Cup
22.	7 June 2026	Patriot Stadium, Bekasi, Indonesia	Mozambique	1–0	4–1	Friendly
23.	7 June 2026	Patriot Stadium, Bekasi, Indonesia	Mozambique	2–0	4–1	Friendly
24.	7 June 2026	Patriot Stadium, Bekasi, Indonesia	Mozambique	3–0	4–1	Friendly

== Honours ==
Al-Quwa Al-Jawiya

- Iraq Stars League: 2025–26
