= Al Tarfa =

Al Tarfa الطرفة
- District
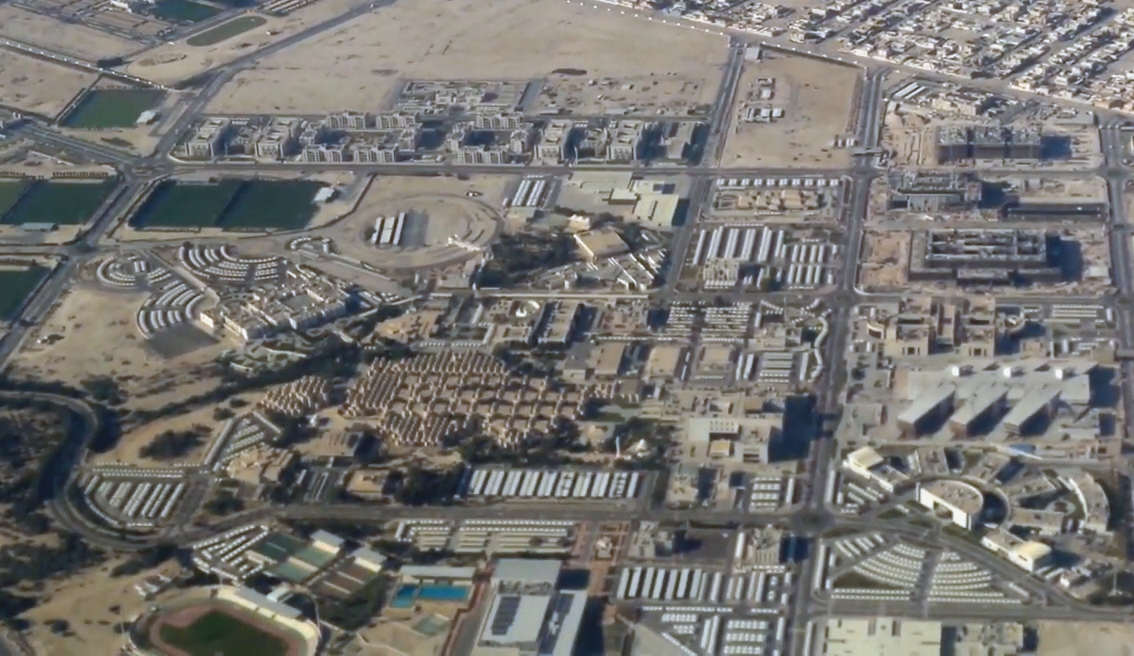
- Aerial view of Al Tarfa, looking west

- Location within Doha Location within Qatar
- Coordinates: 25.3755°N 51.4887°E
- Country: Qatar
- Municipality: Doha
- Zone: Zone 68
- District no.: 110

Area
  - Total: 6.4 km^{2} (2.5 sq mi)

Al Tarfa (Arabic: الطرفة, romanized: Aţ Ţarfah) is a district in Qatar, located in the municipality of Doha. Together with Jelaiah and Jeryan Nejaima, it makes up Zone 68, which has a total population of 5,521 as of 2015.

Jeryan Nejaima Street separates it from the district of the same name to west. To the east is Al Khor Coastal Road, which connects it with the municipality of Al Daayen. Qatar University, the first institution of higher education established in the country, is based in the district.

== Etymology ==
In local dialect, the word tarfa refers to Tamarix aphylla, a short, salt-tolerant tree with scale-like leaves frequently planted for ornamental purposes or used as a shelterbelt. As the area is surrounded by a sabkha (salt flat), salinity levels are too high for most plants aside from Tamarix aphylla, which forms dense stands around the borders of the sabkha.

== Geography ==
Al Tarfa borders the following districts:

- Wadi Al Banat in Al Daayen Municipality to the northwest, separated by Al Tarfa Street.
- Al Egla in Al Daayen Municipality to the northeast, separated by Al Khor Coastal Road.
- West Bay Lagoon to the east, separated by University Street.
- Jelaiah to the south, separated by Jelaiah Street.
- Jeryan Nejaima to the west, separated by Jeryan Nejaima Street.

Aside from the large sabkha enclosing the district, two other geographic features of interest are Wadi Jafn Al Dabb and Rawdat Jafn Al Dabb.

== Landmarks ==
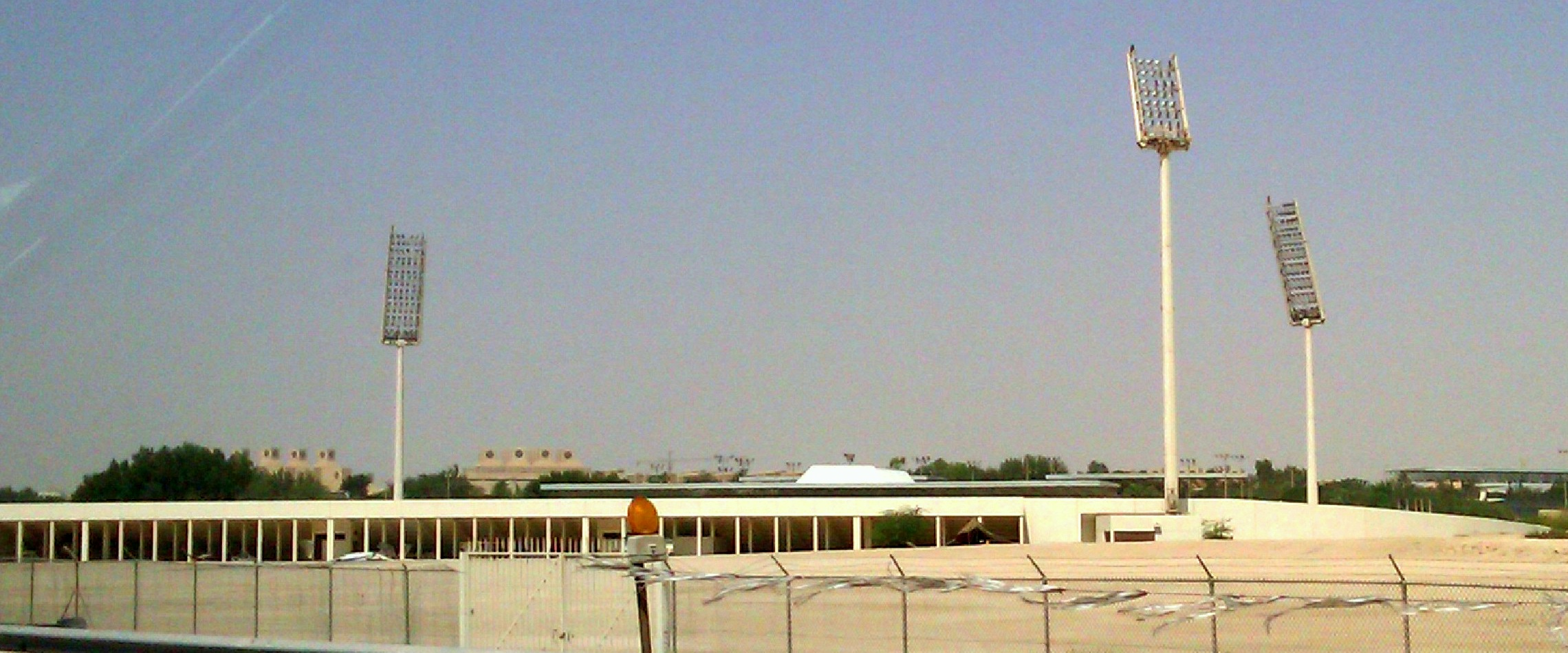
Far view of Qatar University Stadium

- College of the North Atlantic - Qatar on Jeryan Nejaima Street.
- Qatar University Health Center on Jeryan Nejaima Street.
- Qatar University Stadium on Al Jamiaa Street.
- Al Tarfa Roundabout (also known as Golf Course Roundabout).
- French Institute of Qatar, based in new premises opened during November 2025.
