= Zone 68, Qatar =

Zone 68
- Zone
- Interactive map of Zone 68
- Coordinates: 25.369566°N 51.485226°E
- Country: Qatar
- Municipality: Doha
- Blocks: 23

Area
  - Total: 9.7 km^{2} (3.7 sq mi)

Population
  - Total: 5,521 (2,015)
- Time zone: UTC+03 (Arabia Standard Time)
- ISO 3166 code: QA-DA

Zone 68 is a zone of the municipality of Doha in the state of Qatar. The main districts recorded in the 2015 population census were Jelaiah, Al Tarfa, and Jeryan Nejaima.

== Demographics ==
Year	Population
1986	0
1997	40
2004	2,398
2010	5,558
2015	5,521

== Land use ==
The Ministry of Municipality and Environment (MME) breaks down land use in the zone as follows.

Area (km^{2})	Developed land (km^{2})	Undeveloped land (km^{2})	Residential (km^{2})	Commercial/ Industrial (km^{2})	Education/ Health (km^{2})	Farming/ Green areas (km^{2})	Other uses (km^{2})
9.74	8.32	1.42	1.05	0.00	6.01	0.00	1.26
