= 2021–22 Oman Professional League =

Oman Professional League
- Season: 2021–22
- Champions: Al-Seeb (2nd title)
- Relegated: Muscat, Nizwa, Saham.
- AFC Champions League: Al-Seeb
- AFC Cup: Al-Seeb
- Matches: 182
- Goals: 399 (2.19 per match)

The 2021–22 Oman Professional League is the 46th edition of the Oman Professional League, the top football league in Oman. The season started on 16 October 2021.

== Team ==
The same teams from the cancelled season will continue. The clubs are:

Team	Location	Stadium	Capacity
Dhofar Club	Salalah	Al-Saada Stadium	8,000
Al-Seeb Club	Seeb	Al-Seeb Stadium	14,000
Sohar SC	Sohar	Sohar Club Stadium	3,350
Saham Club	Sohar	Sohar Regional Sports Complex	19,000
Oman Club	Muscat	Sultan Qaboos Sports Complex	34,000
Nizwa Club	Nizwa	Nizwa Sports Complex	15,000
Al-Nasr SC	Salalah	Al-Saada Stadium	8,000
Bahla Club			
Al Rustaq Club	Rustaq	Rustaq Sports Complex	17,000
Suwaiq Club	Seeb	Al-Seeb Stadium	14,000
Al-Nahda Club	Al-Buraimi	Al-Buraimi Sports Stadium	17,000
Al-Ittihad Club	Salalah	Al-Saada Stadium	8,000
Muscat Club	Muscat	Sultan Qaboos Sports Complex	34,000
Al-Musannah SC	Seeb	Al-Seeb Stadium	14,000

Locations of teams in the 2019-20 Oman Professional League

== League table ==
Pos	Team	Pld	W	D	L	GF	GA	GD	Pts	Qualification or relegation
1	Al-Seeb (C)	26	16	7	3	50	17	+33	55	Qualification for AFC Champions League qualifiers via 2022 AFC Cup winners
2	Al-Nahda	26	15	8	3	35	17	+18	53	
3	Dhofar	26	13	9	4	39	17	+22	48	
4	Al-Musannah SC	26	12	7	7	33	24	+9	43	
5	Al-Nasr	26	11	9	6	28	22	+6	42	
6	Sohar	26	10	9	7	32	31	+1	39	
7	Al-Rustaq	26	9	8	9	25	24	+1	35	
8	Oman	26	8	7	11	30	33	−3	31	
9	Al-Suwaiq	26	8	7	11	24	28	−4	31	
10	Al-Ittihad Club	26	5	10	11	20	39	−19	25	
11	Bahla	26	5	9	12	28	35	−7	24	
12	Muscat (R)	26	5	7	14	21	33	−12	22	Relegation to Oman First Division League
13	Saham (R)	26	3	11	12	19	36	−17	20	Relegation to Oman First Division League
14	Nizwa Club (R)	26	4	8	14	15	43	−28	20	Relegation to Oman First Division League

Updated to match(es) played on 14 May 2022. Source: Soccerway
Rules for classification: 1) Points; 2) Goal difference; 3) Goals scored.
(C) Champions; (R) Relegated
