= Abdullah Fawaz =

Omani footballer (born 1996)

Personal information
- Full name: Abdullah Fawaz Afrah Bait Abdulghafur
- Date of birth: 3 October 1996 (age 30)
- Place of birth: Salalah, Oman
- Height: 1.79 m (5 ft 10 in)
- Position: Midfielder

Team information
- Current team: Al-Nahda Club (Oman)
- Number: 27

Youth career
- –2015: Dhofar Youth

Senior career*
| Years | Team | Apps | (Gls) |
| 2015–2023 | Dhofar | 7 | (0) |
| 2023–2024 | Al-Nahda | 15 | (2) |
| 2024 | Al Qadsia | | |
| 2024- | Al-Nahda Club (Oman) | 10 | (0) |

International career^{‡}
| 2018 | Oman U23 | 3 | (0) |
| 2017– | Oman | 23 | (5) |
Medal record
Men's football
Representing Oman
Gulf Cup
| Runner-up | 2024 Kuwait |
- * Club domestic league appearances and goals ‡ National team caps and goals as of 2 February 2022

Abdullah Fawaz Afrah Bait Abdulghafur (born 3 October 1996) is an Omani professional football player who plays as a midfielder for Al Qadsia and the Omani national team.

== International career ==
He made his international debut for Oman on 10 October 2017 in a 2019 AFC Asian Cup qualification match against the Maldives, in their 3–1 victory.

On 9 January 2018, he appeared at the Omani U-23 team to compete at the 2018 AFC U-23 Championship against China in a 3–0 defeat.

On 11 June 2021, Fawaz scored his first two goals for Oman against Afghanistan in a 2022 FIFA World Cup qualifying match in a 1–2 victory.

== International goals ==
| No. | Date | Venue | Opponent | Score | Result | Competition |
|---|---|---|---|---|---|---|
| 1. | 11 June 2021 | Jassim bin Hamad Stadium, Doha, Qatar | Afghanistan | 1–0 | 2–1 | 2022 FIFA World Cup qualification |
| 2. | 11 June 2021 | Jassim bin Hamad Stadium, Doha, Qatar | Afghanistan | 2–1 | 2–1 | 2022 FIFA World Cup qualification |
| 3. | 1 February 2022 | Sultan Qaboos Sports Complex, Muscat, Oman | Australia | 1–1 | 2–2 | 2022 FIFA World Cup qualification |
| 4. | 1 February 2022 | Sultan Qaboos Sports Complex, Muscat, Oman | Australia | 2–2 | 2–2 | 2022 FIFA World Cup qualification |
| 5. | 29 March 2022 | Sultan Qaboos Sports Complex, Muscat, Oman | China | 2–0 | 2–0 | 2022 FIFA World Cup qualification |
| 6. | 6 September 2023 | Sultan Qaboos Sports Complex, Muscat, Oman | Palestine | 1–1 | 2–1 | Friendly |
| — | 6 January 2024 | Al Nahyan Stadium, Abu Dhabi, United Arab Emirates | United Arab Emirates | 1–0 | 1–0 | Unofficial friendly |
| 7. | 10 October 2024 | Sultan Qaboos Sports Complex, Muscat, Oman | Kuwait | 4–0 | 4–0 | 2026 FIFA World Cup qualification |
