= Qatar University Stadium =

Multi-purpose stadium in Doha, Qatar

Coordinates: 25°22′31″N 51°29′45″E

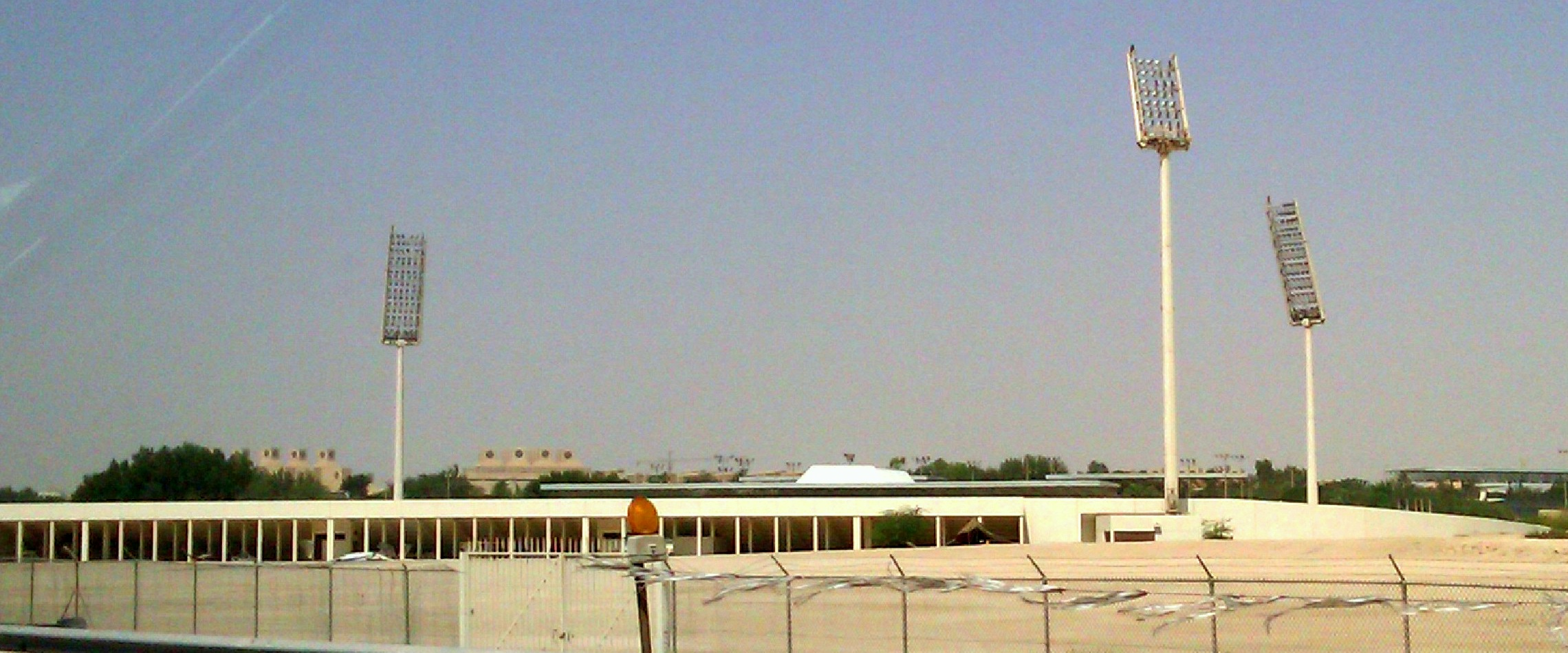
- Interactive map of Qatar University Stadium
- Location: Doha, Qatar
- Owner: Qatar University
- Capacity: 10,000
- Surface: Grass

Qatar University Stadium (Arabic: ملعب جامعة قطر) is a multi-purpose stadium of Qatar University in the Al Tarfa district of Doha, Qatar. It is commonly used for football matches and athletics events of the university. The stadium can host up to 10,000 spectators.
