= Al-Nahda Club (Oman) =

Omani sports club

- Full name: Al-Nahda Club
- Nicknames: Al-Aneed (The Tenacious)
- Founded: March 12, 2003; 23 years ago
- Ground: Al-Buraimi Sports Complex; Al-Buraimi, Oman
- Capacity: 17,000
- Chairman: Sheikh Salim Al-Muzahami
- Manager: Hamad Al Azani
- League: Oman Professional League
- 2025–26: 4th of 14
Home colours	Away colours

Al-Nahda Club (Arabic: نادي النهضة) is an Omani sports club based in Al-Buraimi. The club plays in the Oman Professional League, top division of Oman Football Association. Their home ground is Al-Buraimi Sports Complex. The stadium is government owned, but they also own their own stadium and sports equipment, as well as their own training facilities.

== Players ==
=== First team squad ===
Note: Flags indicate national team as defined under FIFA eligibility rules; some limited exceptions apply. Players may hold more than one non-FIFA nationality.

No.	Pos.	Nation	Player
1	GK	OMA	Ibrahim Al-Mukhaini
2	DF	OMA	Khaled Al Hasem
3	DF	OMA	Thani Al-Rushaidi
4	DF	CMR	Junior Ngede
5	DF	OMA	Nasser Al-Shamli
6	DF	OMA	Juma Al-Habsi
7	FW	ALG	Billel Bensaha
8	MF	OMA	Ali Mousa
9	FW	OMA	Issam Al-Sabhi
10	MF	JOR	Ahmed Israiwah
11	FW	OMA	Rabia Al-Alawi
12	MF	OMA	Abdullah Fawaz
13	DF	OMA	Abdulaziz Al-Shamousi
14	FW	OMA	Hamoud Al-Saadi
15	MF	OMA	Nasser Al-Rawahi
16	DF	OMA	Ahmed Al-Matrooshi
17	GK	OMA	Abdullah Al-Mamari
18	MF	OMA	Mohammed Al-Hinai

No.	Pos.	Nation	Player
19	FW	OMA	Mohammed Al-Ghafri
21	MF	OMA	Ali Al-Rushaidi
22	MF	OMA	Jamal Al-Wahshi
23	MF	OMA	Harib Al-Saadi (C)
24	GK	OMA	Omar Al-Ghabshi
25	DF	OMA	Ghanim Al-Habashi
26	GK	OMA	Alaa Al-Shiyadi
27	FW	OMA	Omar Al-Saiti
32	DF	OMA	Abdulaziz Al-Gheilani
33	FW	ALG	Oussama Amar
38	MF	OMA	Khalfan Al-Nu'aimi
47	DF	OMA	Ahmed Al-Kaabi
66	MF	OMA	Khasib Al-Hosni
70	FW	COD	Walter Bwalya
71	MF	OMA	Bader Ali
77	DF	OMA	Muhannad Al-Alawi
81	FW	CIV	Inters Gui

== Personnel ==
=== Technical staff ===
Position	Name
Head coach	(Oman) Hamad Al Azani
Assistant coach	(Oman) Khalifa Al-Muzahami
Goalkeeping Coach	(Oman) Khamis Al-Saadi
Physiotherapist	(Tunisia) Chekili Hassene Brzhim
Team Manager	(Oman) Hussain Al-Zadjali
Team Supervisor	(Oman) Ahmed Al-Nuaimi
Coordinator	(Oman) Abdulrahman Al-Jabri
Media Coordinator	(Oman) Hamdan Al-Alawi

=== Management ===
Position	Staff
Chairman	Sheikh Ahmed Al-Nuaimi
Chairman	Sheikh Salim Al-Muzahami
Vice-president	Juma Al-Kaabi
General Secretary	Issa Al-Nuaimi
Treasurer	Saif Al-Kaabi
Board Member	Ali Al-Azzani
Head of Marketing	Abdullah Al-Ghaithi

== Presidents ==
Name	From	To
(Oman) Sheikh Ahmed Al-Nuaimi	2003	2010
(Oman) Sheikh Salim Al-Muzahami	2010	present

== Honours ==
Al-Nahda Club players won the 2013–14 Oman Professional League

- Oman Professional League (4):

- Winners 2006–07, 2008–09, 2013–14, 2022–23.
- Runners-up 2005–06, 2021–22.

- Sultan Qaboos Cup (2):

- Winners 2022–23, 2025–26.
- Runners-up 2008, 2012, 2013.

- Oman Professional League Cup (1):

- Winners 2016–17.
- Runners-up 2017–18.

- Oman Super Cup (2):

- Winners 2009, 2014.
- Runners-up

== Club performance in international competitions ==
=== AFC competitions ===
- AFC Champions League : 1 appearance

- 2015 : Preliminary round 2

- AFC Cup : 4 appearances

- 2008 : Semi-Finals
- 2010 : Group Stage
- 2015 : Group Stage
- 2023–24 : Semi-Finals

=== UAFA competitions ===
- Arab Champions League : 1 appearance

- 2006–07 : Round of 32

- GCC Champions League: 4 appearances

- 2008 : Group Stage
- 2012 : Group Stage
- 2014 : Semi-Finals
- 2025–26 :

== See also ==
- List of football clubs in Oman
