= Sisaket Provincial Stadium =

Football stadium in Sisaket, Thailand

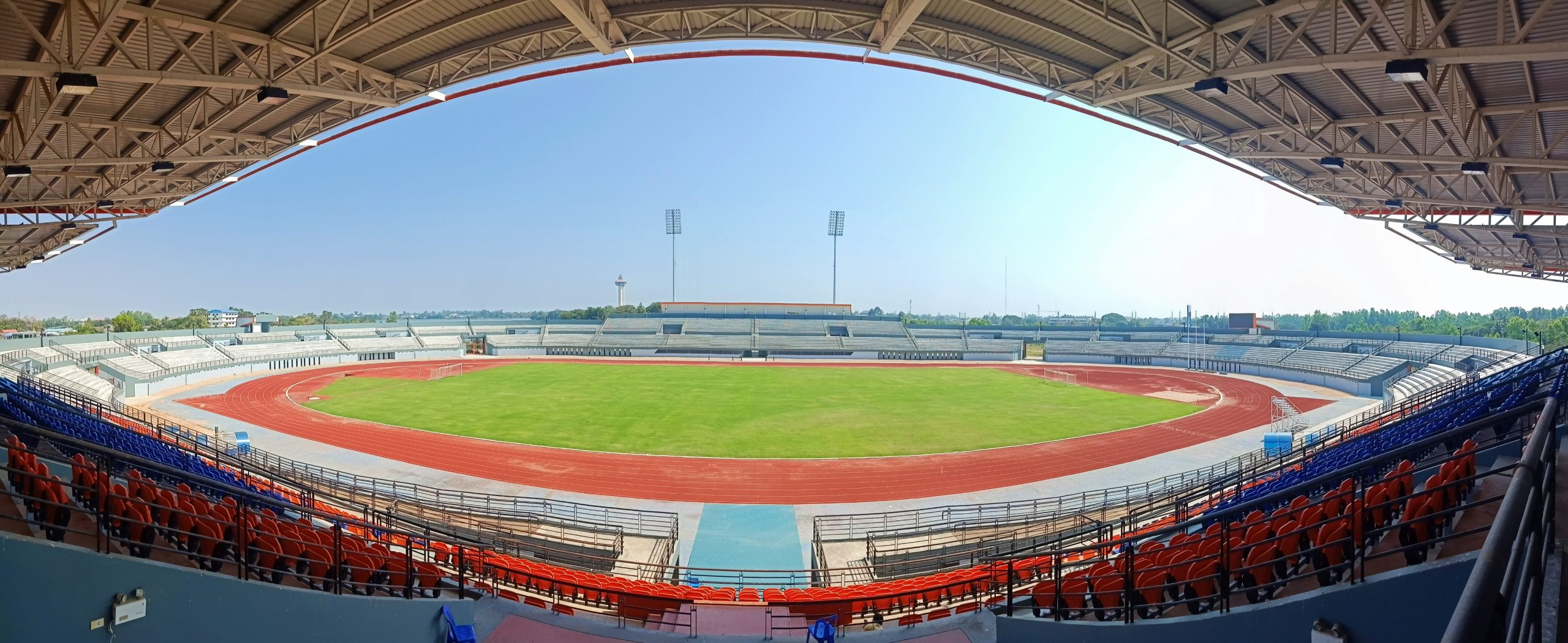
- Interactive map of Sisaket Provincial Stadium
- Full name: Sisaket Provincial Stadium
- Location: Mueang Sisaket District, Sisaket, Thailand
- Coordinates: 15°05′20″N 104°19′25″E
- Operator: Rasisalai United F.C.
- Capacity: 12,000
- Surface: Grass

Construction
- Opened: 2015
- Renovated: 2026

Tenant
- Rasisalai United F.C.

The Sisaket Provincial Stadium (Thai: สนามกีฬากลางจังหวัดศรีสะเกษ) also known as the Koh Klang Nam Stadium (เกาะกลางน้ำ สเตเดียม) is a sports stadium in Sisaket Province, Thailand. It is scheduled to host the 2026 King’s Cup during the November 2026 FIFA match day window. This stadium was built to be the new provincial stadium of Sisaket, replacing the Sri Nakhon Lamduan stadium, although both stadiums remain in use.
