= Sisaket =

Sisaket ศรีสะเกษ (Thai) ซีซะเกด (Northern Khmer)
- Town
- เทศบาลเมืองศรีสะเกษ
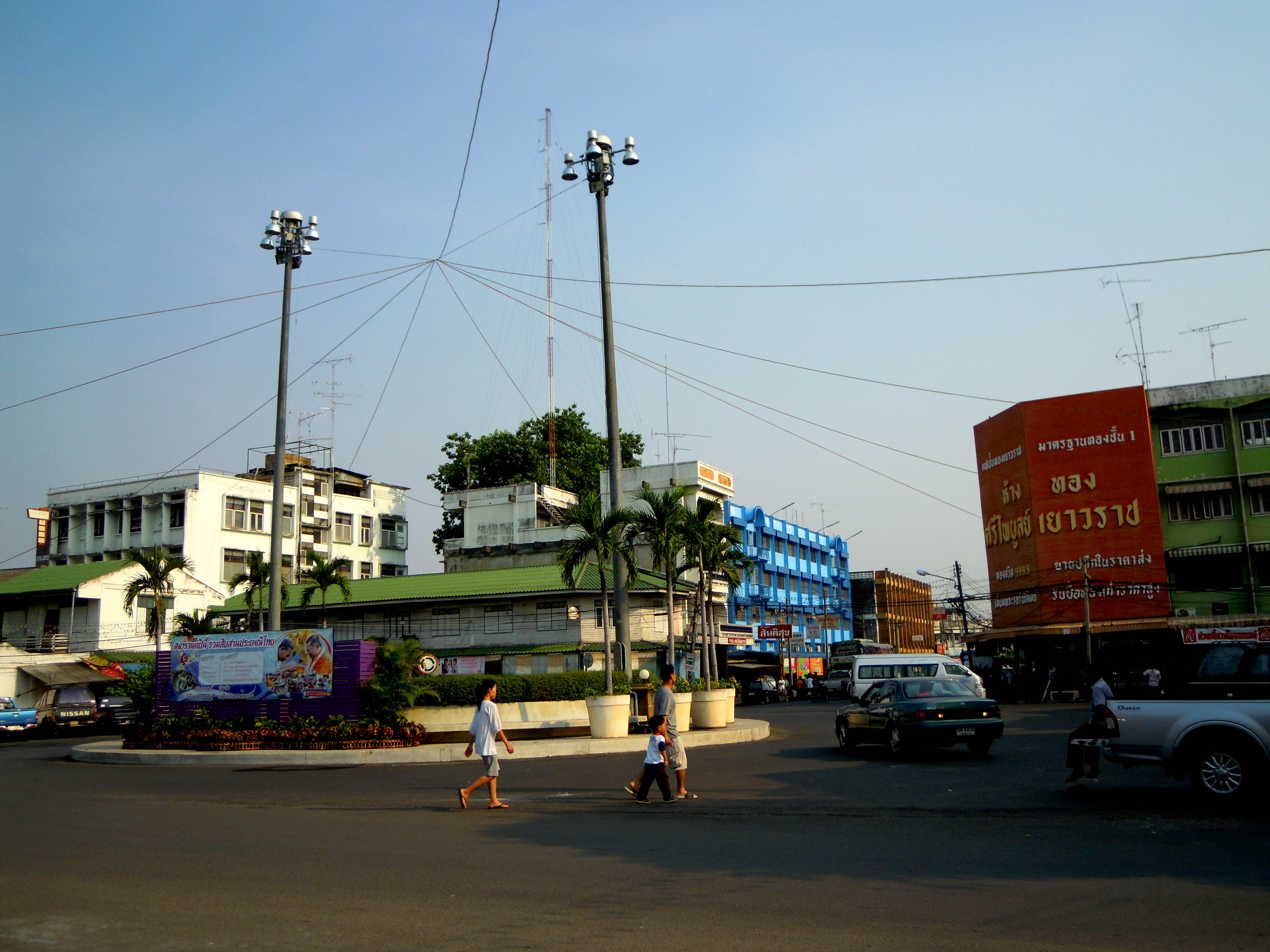

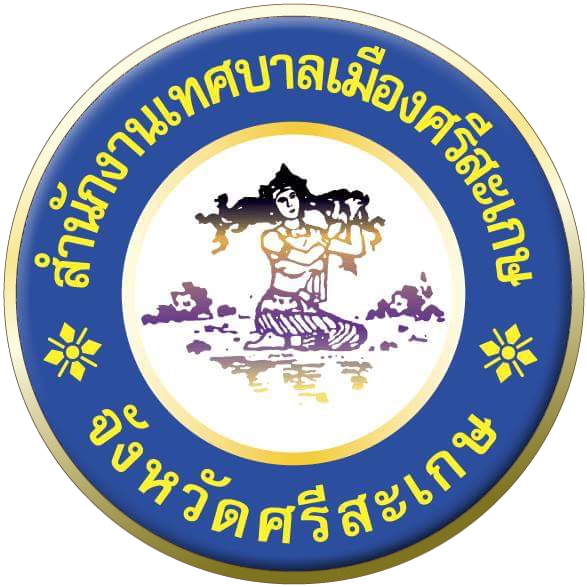
- Seal

- Location in Thailand
- Coordinates: 15°06′25″N 104°19′46″E
- Country: Thailand
- Province: Sisaket
- District: Mueang Sisaket

Government
  - Mayor: Chatmongkhon Angkhasakunkiat (Thai: ฉัฐมงคล อังคสกุลเกียรติ)

Area
  - Total: 36.66 km^{2} (14.15 sq mi)

Population (2017)
  - Total: 40,117
- Time zone: UTC+7 (ICT)
- Postcode: 33000
- Area code: (+66) 45
- Website: www.musisaket.go.th

Sisaket (Thai: ศรีสะเกษ, RTGS: Si Sa Ket, pronounced [sǐː sàʔ kèːt]; Northern Khmer: ซีซะเกด) is a town municipality in northeast Thailand, incorporating Mueang Nuea and Mueang Tai Subdistricts and parts of Cham, Nong Khrok, Pho, Phon kha, and Ya Plong Subdistricts, all in Mueang Sisaket district, the capital of Sisaket province. As of 2017, it has a population of 40,117.

== History ==
The municipality was created by a royal decree that took effect on 29 November 1936 and was then named Khu Khan after the province. The municipality covered the subdistricts of Mueang Nuea and Mueang Tai, with the area of 3.26 km^{2}.

On 6 March 1939, the municipality was renamed Sisaket, following the renaming of the province the year before.

On 12 March 1987, the municipality was extended to parts of Cham, Nong Khrok, Pho, Phon kha, and Ya Plong Subdistricts, with the total area of 36.66 km^{2}.

== Transport ==
Sisaket is on the northeastern railway line from Bangkok's central station, Hua Lamphong Railway Station to Warin Chamrap District, and also has frequent service to and from Bangkok's Northern Bus Terminal (Mo Chit Mai), with bus connections to all the northern and northeastern provinces.

== Climate ==
Climate data for Sisaket (2006–2021)
Month	Jan	Feb	Mar	Apr	May	Jun	Jul	Aug	Sep	Oct	Nov	Dec	Year
Mean daily maximum °C (°F)	31.1 (88.0)	33.5 (92.3)	35.7 (96.3)	36.5 (97.7)	35.1 (95.2)	34.0 (93.2)	32.8 (91.0)	32.4 (90.3)	31.9 (89.4)	31.5 (88.7)	31.7 (89.1)	30.5 (86.9)	33.1 (91.5)
Daily mean °C (°F)	24.0 (75.2)	26.1 (79.0)	28.6 (83.5)	29.8 (85.6)	29.5 (85.1)	29.1 (84.4)	28.3 (82.9)	28.0 (82.4)	27.7 (81.9)	27.2 (81.0)	26.3 (79.3)	24.3 (75.7)	27.4 (81.3)
Mean daily minimum °C (°F)	18.0 (64.4)	19.7 (67.5)	22.9 (73.2)	24.8 (76.6)	25.5 (77.9)	25.6 (78.1)	25.1 (77.2)	25.0 (77.0)	24.7 (76.5)	23.8 (74.8)	21.8 (71.2)	19.0 (66.2)	23.0 (73.4)
Average precipitation mm (inches)	2.9 (0.11)	12.9 (0.51)	26.3 (1.04)	69.3 (2.73)	210.2 (8.28)	178.2 (7.02)	248.9 (9.80)	260.9 (10.27)	288.6 (11.36)	125.7 (4.95)	21.0 (0.83)	3.1 (0.12)	1,448 (57.02)
Average precipitation days (≥ 1.0 mm)	1	2	4	7	14	15	18	20	19	10	3	1	114
Average relative humidity (%)	68	66	66	69	76	78	80	83	85	80	73	70	75
Source: Soil Resources Survey and Research Division
