= Faisal Al-Dakhil =

Kuwaiti footballer

Personal information
- Full name: Faisal Ali Al-Dakhil
- Date of birth: 13 August 1957 (age 69)
- Place of birth: Kuwait City, Kuwait
- Height: 1.76 m (5 ft 9 in)
- Position: Forward

Senior career*
| Years | Team | Apps | (Gls) |
| 1973–1989 | Qadsia | | (141) |

International career
| 1974–1988 | Kuwait | 85 | (39) |
| 1974–1987 | Kuwait XI | 22 | (4) |
- * Club domestic league appearances and goals

Faisal Ali Al-Dakhil (/dæxiːl/), also spelled Al-Dakheel (Arabic: فيصل الدخيل) (born 13 August 1957) is a Kuwaiti retired footballer.

Al-Dakhil was among the Kuwaiti players who won the 1980 Asian Cup. He played four matches for Kuwait at the 1980 Summer Olympics with three goals in only one match against Nigeria on 21 July in Dynamo Stadion in Moscow.

Al-Dakhil played with Al-Qadsiya Club

== Club career statistics ==
| Club | Season | League | | | Kuwait Emir Cup | | Independence Cup | | Kuwait Joint League | | Total | |
| Club | Season | Division | Apps | Goals | Apps | Goals | Apps | Goals | Apps | Goals | Apps | Goals |
|---|---|---|---|---|---|---|---|---|---|---|---|---|
| Qadsia | 1973–74 | KPL | | 2 | | | — | | | | | |
| Qadsia | 1974–75 | KPL | | 7 | | | — | | | | | |
| Qadsia | 1975–76 | KPL | | 15 | | | — | | | | | |
| Qadsia | 1976–77 | KPL | | 11 | | | — | | | | | |
| Qadsia | 1977–78 | KPL | | 4 | | | — | | | | | |
| Qadsia | 1978–79 | KPL | | 7 | | | — | | | | | |
| Qadsia | 1979–80 | KPL | | 18 | | | — | | | | | |
| Qadsia | 1980–81 | KPL | | 21 | | | — | | | | | |
| Qadsia | 1981–82 | KPL | | 0 | | | — | | | | | |
| Qadsia | 1982–83 | KPL | | 0 | | | — | | | | | |
| Qadsia | 1983–84 | KPL | | 7 | | | — | | | | | |
| Qadsia | 1984–85 | KPL | | 22 | | | — | | | | | |
| Qadsia | 1985–86 | KPL | | 7 | | | — | | | | | |
| Qadsia | 1986–87 | KPL | | 3 | | | | 2 | | | | |
| Qadsia | 1987–88 | KPL | | 11 | | | — | | | | | |
| Career total | | | | 141 | | 22 | | 2 | | 4 | | 169 |

== International goals ==
only in AFC Asian Cup and World Cup Finals

| Date | Venue | Opponent | Score | Result | Competition |
|---|---|---|---|---|---|
| 1980-09-25 | Kuwait City, Kuwait | Qatar | 4–0 | Win | 1980 AFC Asian Cup |
| 1980-09-25 | Kuwait City, Kuwait | Qatar | 4–0 | Win | 1980 AFC Asian Cup |
| 1980-09-28 | Kuwait City, Kuwait | Iran | 2–1 | Win | 1980 AFC Asian Cup |
| 1980-09-30 | Kuwait City, Kuwait | South Korea | 3–0 | Win | 1980 AFC Asian Cup |
| 1980-09-30 | Kuwait City, Kuwait | South Korea | 3–0 | Win | 1980 AFC Asian Cup |
| 1982-06-17 | Valladolid, Spain | Czechoslovakia | 1–1 | Draw | 1982 FIFA World Cup |
| 1984-12-09 | Singapore | Syria | 3–1 | Win | 1984 AFC Asian Cup |

== Honours ==
=== Club ===
Qadsia

- Kuwaiti Premier League: 1972–73, 1974–75, 1975–76, 1977–78
- Kuwait Emir Cup:1973–74, 1974–75, 1978–79, 1988–89

=== International ===
- AFC Asian Cup: 1980

=== Regional ===
- Arabian Gulf Cup: 1976, 1986
