= Fahad Al Hamad =

Kuwaiti footballer

Personal information
- Full name: Fahad Hazza Al Hamad Al Fahad
- Date of birth: 1 December 1983 (age 42)
- Place of birth: Kuwait City, Kuwait
- Height: 1.81 m (5 ft 11 in)
- Position: Forward

Youth career
- 2000–2003: Kazma

Senior career*
Years	Team	Apps	(Gls)
2000–2014	Kazma	164	(68)
2006	→ Al Nahda (loan)		
2008	→ Al Salmiya (loan)		

International career
2004–2009	Kuwait	37	(10)
- * Club domestic league appearances and goals

Fahad Hazza Al Hamad Al Fahad (Arabic: فهد هزاع الحمد الفهد, born 1 December 1983) is a Kuwaiti former footballer who played as a forward.

== Club career statistics ==
Club	Season	League			Kuwait Emir Cup		GCC Champions League		Kuwait Crown Prince Cup		AFC Champions League		Total		
Club	Season	Division	Apps	Goals	Apps	Goals	Apps	Goals	Apps	Goals	Apps	Goals	Apps	Goals	Assists
Kazma	2000–01	KPL		2						6					
Kazma	2001–02	KPL								1					
Kazma	2002–03	KPL								0					
Kazma	2003–04	KPL								0					
Kazma	2004–05	KPL		3						2					
Kazma	2005–06	KPL		20						1					
Kazma	2006–07	KPL		7						1					
Kazma	2007–08	KPL		8						0					
Kazma	2008–09	KPL		4						0					
Kazma	2009–10	KPL		6						0					
Kazma	2010–11	KPL		5						0					
Kazma	2011–12	KPL		5						0					
Kazma	2012–13	KPL		3						1					
Kazma	2013–14	KPL								0					
Kazma	2014–15	KPL								0					
Career total			164	68						12			313	124	18
