= Bashar Abdullah =

Kuwaiti footballer

Personal information
- Full name: Bashar Abdullah Salem Abdulaziz
- Date of birth: 12 October 1977 (age 49)
- Place of birth: Kuwait City, Kuwait
- Height: 1.74 m (5 ft 8 1/2 in)
- Position: Striker

Youth career
- 1987–1994: Al-Salmiyah

Senior career*
Years	Team	Apps	(Gls)
1994–2010	Al-Salmiyah	543	(97)
1998–1999	→ Al-Hilal (loan)		(2)
2000	→ Al-Arabi SC (Qatar) (loan)		
2001–2002	→ Al Rayyan (loan)	16	(8)
2002–2003	→ Al Ain FC (loan)	1	
2004–2005	→ Al Kuwait (loan)		(5)
2010–2011	Al Kuwait		(2)

International career
1996–2007	Kuwait	134	(75)
- * Club domestic league appearances and goals

Bashar Abdullah Abdul Aziz (Arabic: بشار عبد الله سالم عبد العزيز; born 12 October 1977) is a Kuwaiti former professional footballer who played as a forward. He was a part of the mini revival of Kuwaiti football between 1996 and 1998. His part included winning two Gulf Cups, reaching the semi-finals of the AFC Asian Cup and coming second in the Arab Cup and Asian Olympics. He was also in the national team that reached the 2000 Olympics in Sydney. He also helped his club Al-Salmiyah win the league three times and Emir Cup once.

On 26 November 2015, he announced his retirement Friendly match on January 13, 2016, between Al-Salmiya SC and Al-Hilal FC.

On 25 May 2018, he came back to play a testimonial match for Kuwait against Egypt.

== Club career statistics ==
Club	Season	League			Kuwait Emir Cup		Kuwait Crown Prince Cup		AFC Champions League		AFC Cup		Arab Club Champions Cup		GCC Champions League		Al-Khurafi Cup		Other		Total	
Club	Season	Division	Apps	Goals	Apps	Goals	Apps	Goals	Apps	Goals	Apps	Goals	Apps	Goals	Apps	Goals	Apps	Goals	Apps	Goals	Apps	Goals
Al-Salmiya	1994–95	KPL		9													—					
Al-Salmiya	1995–96	KPL		4												3	—					
Al-Salmiya	1996–97	KPL		4													—					
Al-Salmiya	1997–98	KPL		10		5											—					
Al-Salmiya	1998–99	KPL		0						1							—					
Al-Salmiya	1999–2000	KPL		18														2				
Al-Salmiya	2000–01	KPL		10												1						
Al-Salmiya	2001–02	KPL		0																		
Al-Salmiya	2002–03	KPL		5		2		4														
Al-Salmiya	2003–04	KPL		2																		
Al-Salmiya	2005–06	KPL		12				4								2		5				
Al-Salmiya	2006–07	KPL		10		2		3										4		1 (Note: Goals in Super ALHassawi)		
Al-Salmiya	2007–08	KPL		10		1		1								2	—					
Al-Salmiya	2007–08	KPL		10													—					
Al-Salmiya	2007–08	KPL		10													—					
Al-Salmiya	2008–09	KPL		1													—					
Al-Salmiya	2009–10	KPL		0													—			2 (Note: Goals in Kuwait Federation Cup)		
Al-Salmiya	Total			97		16		24		1		0		0		8		12		3		161
Kuwait	2004–05	KPL		5		0		1	6	2	—			1	—		—					
Kuwait	2009–10	KPL		1		0		1	—		5	1	—		—		—					
Kuwait	2010–11	KPL		1		0		0	—		—		—		—		—					
Kuwait	Total			7		0		2	6	2	5	1		1		0		0		0		13
Career total				104		16		26		3		1		1		8		12		0		174

== International career ==
He obtained 134 international caps with his national team, thus entering the symbolic but exclusive circle of players with a century of caps. He also scored 75 international goals for Kuwait.

== See also ==
- List of men's footballers with 100 or more international caps
- List of men's footballers with 50 or more international goals
