= Jasem Yaqoub =

Kuwaiti footballer

- Jasem during his playing days

Personal information
- Full name: Jasem Yaqoub Sultan Al-Besara
- Date of birth: 25 October 1953 (age 72)
- Place of birth: Kuwait City, Kuwait
- Height: 1.79 m (5 ft 10 1/2 in)
- Position: Striker

Senior career*
Years	Team	Apps	(Gls)
1970–1983	Qadsia	109+	(146)

International career
1972–1982	Kuwait	49	(36)
	Kuwait Military	?	(29)
- * Club domestic league appearances and goals

Jasem Yaqoub Sultan Al-Besara (Arabic: جَاسِم يَعْقُوب سُلْطَان الْبَصَارَة; born 25 October 1953) is a Kuwaiti former professional footballer who played as a forward. He represented the Kuwait national team at both the 1980 Summer Olympics and the 1982 FIFA World Cup.

== Club career ==
Yaqoub initially played for the Al-Qadsia youth team as a volleyball player, before joining their youth football team in 1967, where he rose up the ranks and got promoted to their senior squad in 1970. He initially signed with Kazma before getting signed by Al-Qadsia.

Yaqoub made his debut with the first team on October 2, 1970, in a 5–0 win against Al-Shuhada, coach Ron Lewin subbed him on for an injured player in the game, the game would end with Jassim scoring four goals.

One of his memorable goals came against Pelé's Santos, where he scored to enable a 1–1 draw.

Jassim was the top goal-scorer in the Kuwaiti League five times (1972/1973, 1974/1975, 1975/1976, 1976/1977 and 1979/1980). In the 1979/1980 season, he became to first player to win the Arabian Golden Boot with 31 goals in 26 matches.

He also helped his team win the Emir Cup several times, even scoring a bicycle kick in the final of the 1978/1979 Emir Cup final.

== International career ==
Jassim represented Kuwait from 1972 to 1982 scoring 36 goals in 49 appearances. He scored on his debut at the 1972 Gulf Cup against Saudi Arabia. He went on to participate in the 1974, 1976, 1979 and 1982 editions of the tournament, he was the top goal-scorer in 1974 and 1976 scoring 6 and 9 goals. He also is the highest goal-scorer in the history of the Gulf Cup with 18 goals to his name.

In 1980, He won the 1980 Asian Cup with Kuwait scoring four goals in the tournament and being named in the Team of the Tournament.

Jassim appeared in the 1974 Asian Games and the 1978 Asian Games, He also participated in 1982 World Cup.

== Honours ==
=== Club ===
- Kuwaiti League: 1970–71, 1972–73, 1974–75, 1975–76, 1977–78
- Emir Cup: 1971–72, 1973–74, 1974–75, 1978–79

=== International ===
- Asian Cup: 1980
  - runners-up: 1976
- Arabian Gulf Cup: 1972, 1974, 1976, 1982

=== Individual ===
- Kuwaiti League top goal-scorer: 1972–73, 1974–75, 1975–76, 1976–77, 1979–80
- AFC Asian Cup Team of the Tournament: 1980

== Career statistics ==
Club	Season	League			Kuwait Emir Cup		Kuwait Joint League		Total	
Club	Season	Division	Apps	Goals	Apps	Goals	Apps	Goals	Apps	Goals
Qadsia SC	1970–71	KPL		1			—			
Qadsia SC	1971–72	KPL		3				5		
Qadsia SC	1972–73	KPL		15				4		
Qadsia SC	1973–74	KPL		9				8		
Qadsia SC	1974–75	KPL		25		5	—			
Qadsia SC	1975–76	KPL		16			—			
Qadsia SC	1976–77	KPL		14		4		1		
Qadsia SC	1977–78	KPL		0			—			
Qadsia SC	1978–79	KPL		3		4	—			
Qadsia SC	1979–80	KPL		31			—			
Qadsia SC	1980–81	KPL		15			—			
Qadsia SC	1981–82	KPL		0			—			
Qadsia SC	1982–83	KPL		12			—			
Career total				146		24		18		188
