= Ali Marwi =

Kuwaiti footballer

Personal information
- Full name: Ali Marwi Al-Hadiyah
- Date of birth: October 14, 1969 (age 57)
- Place of birth: Kuwait
- Height: 1.70 m (5 ft 7 in)
- Position: Forward

Senior career*
Years	Team	Apps	(Gls)
1986–2002	Al-Salmiya		(111)
1996–1997	→ Al-Ahli Jeddah (loan)		
1999–1999	→ Dhofar Club (loan)		

International career
1988–1998	Kuwait	27	(16)
- * Club domestic league appearances and goals as of December 10, 2022

Ali Marwi (Arabic: علي مروي) is a former Kuwaiti footballer. He prominently played during the early-to-late 1990s with the Kuwaiti national football team as a forward. He spent most of his career with Kuwait giants Al-Salmiya. He competed in the men's tournament at the 1992 Summer Olympics.

== Career ==
Marwi has had a long career, with the national team and made appearances in several Gulf Cups. In 1992, Ali Marwi scored one goal in the U.A.E. net, as well as another in the Saudi net. During the 1994 competition, Ali also scored one goal against the Qatari national team.

Ali Marwi also spent a short time at Omani giants Dhofar in 1999, and scored the winning goal against rivals Al-Nasr (Salalah) in the final of the Sultan Qaboos Cup.

== Club career statistics ==
Club	Season	League			Kuwait Emir Cup		Kuwait Crown Prince Cup		Arab Club Champions Cup		Arab Cup Winners' Cup		GCC Champions League		Al-Khurafi Cup		AFC Champions League		Total	
Club	Season	Division	Apps	Goals	Apps	Goals	Apps	Goals	Apps	Goals	Apps	Goals	Apps	Goals	Apps	Goals	Apps	Goals	Apps	Goals
Al-Salmiya	1989–90	KPL		5											—					
Al-Salmiya	1991–92	KPL		3											—					
Al-Salmiya	1992–93	KPL		10		5									—					
Al-Salmiya	1993–94	KPL		8											—					
Al-Salmiya	1994–95	KPL		10				5							—					
Al-Salmiya	1995–96	KPL		14										2	—					
Al-Salmiya	1996–97	KPL		4		5									—					
Al-Salmiya	1997–98	KPL		29											—					
Al-Salmiya	1998–99	KPL		22				5								5				
Al-Salmiya	1999–2000	KPL		0		3										4				
Al-Salmiya	2000–01	KPL		0												0				
Al-Salmiya	2001–02	KPL		4												0				
Career total				111		17		34		3		3		2		9	3	1		180
