= Bader Al-Mutawa =

Kuwaiti footballer

Bader al-Mutawa
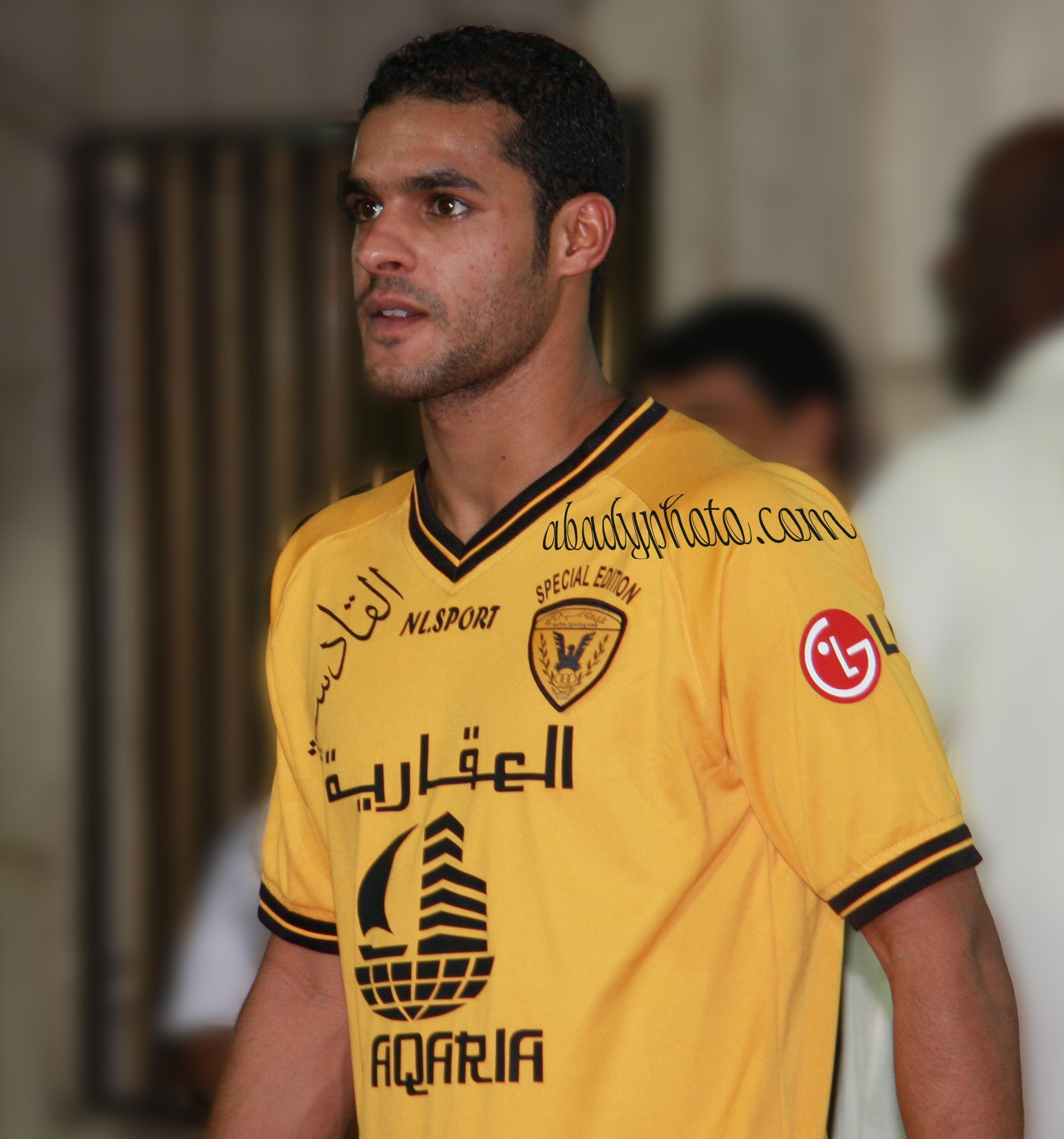
- Al-Mutawa with Qadsia in 2007

Personal information
- Full name: Bader Ahmed al-Mutawa
- Date of birth: 10 January 1985 (age 41)
- Place of birth: Kuwait City, Kuwait
- Height: 1.75 m (5 ft 9 in)
- Position: Forward

Team information
- Current team: Qadsia
- Number: 17

Senior career*
Years	Team	Apps	(Gls)
2002–	Qadsia	300	(175)
2007	→ Qatar SC (loan)	0	(0)
2011	→ Al Nassr (loan)	9	(3)

International career
2003–2022	Kuwait	202	(55)
- * Club domestic league appearances and goals as of 14 January 2025 (UTC)

Bader Ahmed al-Mutawa (Arabic: بدر أحمد المطوع; born 10 January 1985) is a Kuwaiti professional footballer who plays for Qadsia. He usually operates as a second striker. He wears the jersey number 17. Al-Mutawa is the fourth most-capped international player, with 202 caps, behind only Luka Modrić, Lionel Messi and Cristiano Ronaldo.

== Club career ==
Al-Mutawa was born in Kuwait City. His performance for both club and national teams led to him being nominated for the best Asian player in 2006 and 2010, though Al-Mutawa did not win the prize.

He finished as the Kuwaiti league's top scorer among local players for the 2008–09 season, netting 10 goals.

On 23 July 2012, he began training with Nottingham Forest as their new owners, the Al-Hasawi family, arranged a one-month trial for the striker. He impressed manager Sean O'Driscoll enough that the club were looking to sign him on a permanent basis but he was denied a work permit and the club wasn't able to sign him.

On 11 May 2021, he scored his 300th goal for Qadsia in all competitions, including friendly matches, in a 3–1 win over Kuwait SC.

On 2 March 2024, he scored a goal from a penalty kick in the last minutes of the match against Al-Salmiya in a 1–0 win, equaling Firas Al-Khatib’s record as the highest scorer in the Kuwaiti Premier League historically, with 162. Five days later, he scored a goal in Qadsia 7–0 win over Al-Shabab to become the all-time top scorer in the Kuwaiti Premier League history.

== International career ==
Al-Mutawa's first major competition on international level was the 2003 Arabian Gulf Cup, hosted by Kuwait. The home side finished sixth with only five points from six matches (only Yemen, the newcomer to the Gulf Cup finished the tournament with fewer points, sparing Kuwait the embarrassment of ending up at the bottom of the table of the gulf cup for the first time in their history). Al-Mutawa scored once in Kuwait's only victory of the tournament, a 4–0 win against Yemen.

Al-Mutawa played in the 17th Arabian Gulf Cup in 2004, scoring a goal in the 87th minute against Saudi Arabia in Kuwait's opening match. Al-Mutawa excelled in this tournament, forming a strike partnership with captain and star striker Bashar Abdullah. They managed to score five goals between them. This partnership was short lived as Bashar retired from international football shortly after the tournament and Kuwait was eliminated in the semi-finals by Qatar after topping Group B with two victories and one draw with Bahrain.

At the 18th Arabian Gulf Cup in 2007, Al-Mutawa scored goals against Yemen and in the final group match against the United Arab Emirates, but Kuwait exited the tournament for the first time in their history without winning a single game.

On 3 September 2015, Al-Mutawa scored his second senior hat-trick, in a 9–0 defeat of Myanmar in a 2018 FIFA World Cup qualifier.

Al-Mutawa was the men's all-time record appearance holder with 196 caps, after having surpassed Soh Chin Ann's record of 195 recognized by FIFA matches on 14 June 2022. His record was equalled by Portugal's Cristiano Ronaldo during the 2022 FIFA World Cup and later beaten by Ronaldo in the UEFA Euro 2024 qualifiers. His total number of international matches was later readjusted to 202, making him the first player to reach the 200-match milestone.

== Personal life ==
Al-Mutawa holds the military rank of colonel and he is also director of the Security Affairs Department of the Kuwaiti National Assembly Guard, as sports professionalism is not fully applied in Kuwait.

== Career statistics ==
=== Club ===
As of 31 December 2025

Appearances and goals by club, season and competition
Club	Season	League			National Cup (Note: Includes Kuwait Emir Cup, Emir of Qatar Cup, King Cup)		Continental		Other (Note: Includes Kuwait Crown Prince Cup, Kuwait Super Cup, Kuwait Federation Cup, Al-Khurafi Cup, Saudi Crown Prince Cup, GCC Champions League, Arab Club Champions Cup)		Total	
Club	Season	Division	Apps	Goals	Apps	Goals	Apps	Goals	Apps	Goals	Apps	Goals
Qadsia	2002–03	KPL	1	1	1	1	—		0	0	2	2
Qadsia	2003–04	KPL	6	3	2	1	0 (Note: Does not include three matches in the AFC Champions League due to Al-Qadsia being expelled from the tournament after security assaulted the visiting team)	0	4	1	12	5
Qadsia	2004–05	KPL	8	5	2	2	—		6	4	16	11
Qadsia	2005–06	KPL	16	19	3	1	6 (Note: Appearances in AFC Champions League)	5	18+	14	43+	39
Qadsia	2006–07	KPL	9	3	3	2	4	0	18+	9	34+	14
Qadsia	2007–08	KPL	4	3	1	0	4	1	3	0	12	4
Qadsia	2008–09	KPL	12	10	3	3	2	0	5	6	22	19
Qadsia	2009–10	KPL	12	7	1	0	6 (Note: Appearances in AFC Cup)	5	1	1	20	13
Qadsia	2010–11	KPL	5	7	0	0	5	2	2+	2	12+	11
Qadsia	2011–12	KPL	8	7	5	2	7	3	10	4	30	16
Qadsia	2012–13	KPL	14	3	4	4	7	9	3	3	28	19
Qadsia	2013–14	KPL	7	5	5	3	5	1	1	1	18	10
Qadsia	2014–15	KPL	20	12	2	1	11 (Note: Two appearances and one goal in AFC Champions League, nine appearances and seven goals in AFC Cup)	8	2	2	35	23
Qadsia	2015–16	KPL	14	20	2	1	3	2	1	1	20	24
Qadsia	2016–17	KPL	18	11	5	4	—		4	2	27	17
Qadsia	2017–18	KPL	19	6	1	0	—		6	3	26	9
Qadsia	2018–19	KPL	19	5	3	2	4	2	3	1	29	10
Qadsia	2019–20	KPL	14	9	2	2	0	0	1	0	17	11
Qadsia	2020–21	KPL	23	8	2	0	—		6+	5	31+	13
Qadsia	2021–22	KPL	14	5	1	0	—		0	0	15	5
Qadsia	2022–23	KPL	14	5	2	1	—		4	3	20	9
Qadsia	2023–24	KPL	27	13	6	0	—		0	0	33	13
Qadsia	2024–25	KPL	10	5	1	1	—		11	4	22	10
Qadsia	2025–26	KPL	6	3	0	0	—		0	0	6	3
Qadsia	Total		300	175	57	31	64	38	109+	66	530+	310
Qatar (loan)	2006–07	QSL	0	0	1	0	—		0	0	1	0
Qatar (loan)	Total		0	0	1	0	—		0	0	1	0
Al Nassr (loan)	2010–11	SPL	9	3	0	0	7	5	3	1	19	9
Al Nassr (loan)	Total		9	3	0	0	7	5	3	1	19	9
Career total			309	176	58	31	71	43	112+	67	550+	319

=== International ===
Appearances and goals by national team and year
National team	Year	Apps	Goals
Kuwait	2003	13	5
Kuwait	2004	23	7
Kuwait	2005	13	3
Kuwait	2006	8	3
Kuwait	2007	4	2
Kuwait	2008	9	0
Kuwait	2009	18	5
Kuwait	2010	15	10
Kuwait	2011	19	4
Kuwait	2012	10	3
Kuwait	2013	12	5
Kuwait	2014	9	1
Kuwait	2015	9	4
Kuwait	2016	0	0
Kuwait	2017	4	0
Kuwait	2018	5	1
Kuwait	2019	12	3
Kuwait	2020	0	0
Kuwait	2021	11	0
Kuwait	2022	8	0
Total		202	56

== Honours ==
Qadsia

- Kuwaiti Premier League: 2002–03, 2003–04, 2004–05, 2008–09, 2009–10, 2010–11, 2011–12, 2013–14, 2015–16
- Kuwait Emir Cup: 2002-03, 2003–04, 2006–07, 2009–10, 2011–12, 2012–13, 2014–15, 2023–24
- Kuwait Crown Prince Cup: 2003–04, 2004–05, 2005–06, 2008–09, 2012–13, 2013–14, 2017–18
- Kuwait Super Cup: 2009, 2011, 2013, 2014, 2018, 2019, 2025–26
- Kuwait Federation Cup: 2008, 2008–09, 2010–11, 2012–13, 2018–19, 2022–23
- Al-Khurafi Cup: 2002–03, 2005–06
- GCC Champions League: 2005
- AFC Cup: 2014; runner-up 2010, 2013

Kuwait

- Arabian Gulf Cup: 2010
- WAFF Championship: 2010

Individual

- Arabian Gulf Cup top goalscorer: 2010
- IFFHS World's Best International Goal Scorer: 2010

== See also ==
- List of men's footballers with 100 or more international caps
- List of men's footballers with 50 or more international goals
