= Abdulrahman Al-Dawla =

Kuwaiti footballer

Personal information
- Full name: Abdulrahman Al-Dawla Al-Mutawa Al-Qenaei
- Date of birth: 1941 (age 84–85)
- Place of birth: Kuwait City, Kuwait
- Position: Striker

Senior career*
Years	Team	Apps	(Gls)
1961–1975	Al-Arabi	?	(105)

International career
1961–1972	Kuwait	?	(24)
	Kuwait military national football team	?	(31)
- * Club domestic league appearances and goals

Abdulrahman Al-Dawla Al-Mutawa Al-Qenaei (Arabic: عبد الرحمن الدولة المطوع القناعي; born 1941 in Kuwait City) is a Kuwaiti former footballer. He played from 1961 until 1972, and scored 105 goals for his team in the league competition. He was the top scorer in the Kuwait Premier League in 1962–63, 1964–65, 1965–66 and 1966–67. He was also a basketball player.

Abdulrahman also played for the Kuwait national football team. He is the first player to score an official goal for the Kuwait national football team.

== Club career statistics ==
Club	Season	League			Kuwait Emir Cup		Kuwait Joint League		Total	
Club	Season	Division	Apps	Goals	Apps	Goals	Apps	Goals	Apps	Goals
Al-Arabi	1961–62	KPL		11						
Al-Arabi	1962–63	KPL		15						
Al-Arabi	1963–64	KPL		15		7				
Al-Arabi	1964–65	KPL		16						
Al-Arabi	1965–66	KPL		22						
Al-Arabi	1966–67	KPL		12		4				
Al-Arabi	1967–68	KPL		4						
Al-Arabi	1968–69	KPL	3	0						
Al-Arabi	1969–70	KPL		4				8		
Al-Arabi	1970–71	KPL		4				3		
Al-Arabi	1971–72	KPL		2						
Career total				105		27		11		143
