= Abdullah Al-Buloushi =

Kuwaiti footballer

Personal information
- Date of birth: 5 September 1960 (age 66)
- Place of birth: Kuwait City, Kuwait
- Height: 1.76 m (5 ft 9 in)
- Position: Forward

Senior career*
Years	Team	Apps	(Gls)
1977–1989	Al Arabi		

International career
1978-1988	Kuwait	61	(11)
- * Club domestic league appearances and goals

Abdullah Mohamed H. Al-Buloushi (born 5 September 1960) is a Kuwaiti retired footballer. He played for Al Arabi and his country.

His best performance in the Arabian Gulf Cup was in the 5th Arabian Gulf Cup where he scored 4 goals that tournament 2 against the United Arab Emirates national football team and 2 against Qatar national football team to help Kuwait finish runner ups

Al-Buloushi is best known for scoring a goal against France in the 1982 World Cup. France won the game 4–1. He also played for Kuwait at the 1980 Summer Olympics.

== Honours ==
- Kuwait Premier League: 7

1980, 1982, 1983, 1984, 1985, 1988, 1989

- Kuwait Emir Cup: 2
- AGCFF Gulf Club Champions League: 1
- Arabian Gulf Cup: 2

6th Arabian Gulf Cup, 8th Arabian Gulf Cup
