= Rogerinho (footballer, born 1987) =

Brazilian footballer

Personal information
- Full name: Rogério de Assis Silva Coutinho
- Date of birth: March 20, 1987 (age 39)
- Place of birth: Bacabal, Brazil
- Height: 1.76 m (5 ft 9 in)
- Positions: Attacking midfielder; forward

Youth career
- 2005–2006: Uniclinic

Senior career*
Years	Team	Apps	(Gls)
2006–2008	Atlético Paranaense	9	(1)
2008	→ Fortaleza (loan)	?	(?)
2008–2016	Al-Kuwait	?	(42)
2014	→ Al Shabab (loan)	13	(5)
2016	→ Al-Wasl (loan)	11	(1)
2017	Buriram United	2	(0)
2017–2019	Al-Faisaly	50	(14)
2019–2020	Al-Ettifaq	12	(2)
2020–2021	Al-Khaleej	35	(8)
2021–2022	Al-Jabalain	36	(5)
2022–2023	Hatta	18	(3)
2023	Botafogo (PB)	15	(2)
- * Club domestic league appearances and goals as of 17:13, 14 January 2024 (UTC)

Rogério de Assis Silva Coutinho or simply Rogerinho (born March 20, 1987, in Bacabal), is a Brazilian professional footballer who plays as an attacking midfielder.

== Club career ==
=== Early life ===
Rogerinho made his professional debut in 3–3 draw away to J. Malucelli on January 14, 2007, scoring his first professional goal in a 3–3 draw away to Londrina on February 1, 2007, in the Campeonato Paranaense.

He was sent off in a 2–1 defeat away at Paranavaí on February 7, 2007, also in the Campeonato Paranaense.

=== Kuwait SC ===
Rogerinho transferred to Kuwait League champions Al-Kuwait in September 2008. On 21 May 2009, he won the Kuwaiti Emir Cup with Kuwait Sports Club after defeating Al Arabi. Furthermore, he won 3 AFC Cups with Kuwait Sports Club, as well as the Kuwait Crown Prince Cup 2 consecutive seasons (2010 and 2011), and the Kuwait Federation Cup in 2010 and 2012. He won the best player award in 2012 due to his performance in the 2012 AFC Cup. In 2012, Rogerinho also won AFC Award for best foreign player of the year. He won 12 titles with Kuwait Sports Club, making him the most successful player in Kuwait and in Asia.

=== Al Shabab FC ===
In July 2014, he joined Al-Shabab on a 1-year loan deal. On 7 August 2014, he won Saudi Super Cup title with Al-Shabab after defeating Al Nassr FC in a penalty shootout. On 19 December 2014, he left the team after recording 5 goals and 4 assists in 16 appearances for the club.

=== Hatta ===
On 27 July 2022, Rogerinho joined UAE side Hatta.

== Career statistics ==
As of 21 April 2023

Club	Season	League			Crown Prince Cup			National Cup			Kuwait Federation Cup			Continental			Super Cup			Total		
Club	Season	Apps	Goals	Assists	Apps	Goals	Assists	Apps	Goals	Assists	Apps	Goals	Assists	Apps	Goals	Assists	Apps	Goals	Assists	Apps	Goals	Assists
Kuwait	2008–09		1			0			0					0	0							
Kuwait	2009–10		5			1			1					5	3							
Kuwait	2010–11		2			1			1					7	1							
Kuwait	2011–12		5			0			1					12	6							
Kuwait	2012–13		11			1			0					12	7							
Kuwait	2013–14		10			1			1					13	5							
Kuwait	2014–15		6			0			0					6	3							
Kuwait	2015–16		2			1			0					3	2			1				
Kuwait	Total		42			5			4			10		58	27			1			89	
Al-Shabab	2014–15	13	5	4	1	0	0	0	0	0	—						1	0	0	15	5	4
Al Wasl	2015–16	11	1	1	5	0	0	2	0	0	—			—			—			18	1	1
Al-Faisaly	2017–18	22	6	4	1	0	0	5	3	1	—									28	9	5
Al-Faisaly	2018–19	28	8	5	0	0	0	3	2	0	—									31	10	5
Ettifaq	2019–20	12	2	0	0	0	0	0	0	0	—									12	2	0
Khaleej	2020–21	35	8								—			—			—			35	8	
Al-Jabalain	2021–22	36	5								—			—			—			36	5	
Hatta	2022–23	18	3		1	1					—			—			—			19	4	

== Honours ==
Al-Kuwait

- VIVA Premier League: 2012–13, 2014–15
- Kuwait Emir Cup: 2009, 2014
- Kuwait Crown Prince Cup: 2010, 2011
- Kuwait Federation Cup: 2010, 2011-12, 2014–15
- Kuwait Super Cup: 2010, 2015
- AFC Cup: 2009, 2012, 2013

Al-Shabab

- Saudi Super Cup: 2014

Individual

- AFC Foreign Player of the Year: 2012
