= Fahad Al Ansari =

Kuwaiti footballer

Personal information
- Full name: Fahad Ebrahim Al Ansari
- Date of birth: February 25, 1987 (age 39)
- Place of birth: Kuwait City, Kuwait
- Height: 1.90 m (6 ft 3 in)
- Position: Midfielder

Senior career*
Years	Team	Apps	(Gls)
2006–2022	Al Qadsia	149	(24)
2016–2018	→ Al-Ittihad (loan)	52	(9)
2018–2019	→ Al Faisaly (loan)	27	(3)
2021	→ Al-Wakrah (loan)	3	(0)
Total		231	(36)

International career^{‡}
2009–2022	Kuwait	104	(3)
- * Club domestic league appearances and goals as of 18 March 2021 ‡ National team caps and goals as of 8 June 2022

Fahad Ebrahim Al Ansari (Arabic: فَهْد إِبْرَاهِيم الْأَنْصَارِيّ, born 25 February 1987) is a former Kuwaiti footballer who plays as a midfielder for Al Qadsia and the Kuwait national team.

== Trivia ==
He won his 100th international cap in June 2021.

== International goals ==
Scores and results list Kuwait's goal tally first.

#	Date	Venue	Opponent	Score	Result	Competition
1.	23 July 2011	Mohammed Al-Hamad Stadium, Hawally, Kuwait	Philippines	3–0	3–0	2014 FIFA World Cup qualification
2.	25 May 2018	Jaber Al-Ahmad International Stadium, Kuwait City, Kuwait	Egypt	1–0	1–1	Friendly
3.	14 November 2019	Al Kuwait Sports Club Stadium, Kuwait City, Kuwait	Chinese Taipei	2–0	9–0	2022 FIFA World Cup qualification

== Honours ==
=== Al-Qadsia ===
- Kuwaiti Premier League (5) : 2009–10, 2010–11, 2011–12, 2013–14, 2015–16
- Kuwait Emir Cup (4) : 2009–10, 2011–12, 2012–13, 2014–15
- Kuwait Crown Prince Cup (2) : 2013, 2014
- Kuwait Super Cup (3) : 2011, 2013, 2014
- AFC Cup : 2014

=== Al-Ittihad ===
- Crown Prince Cup: 2016–17
- King Cup: 2018
