= Ismail Al-Ajmi =

Omani footballer (born 1984)

Personal information
- Full name: Ismail Sulaiman Ashoor Al-Ajmi
- Date of birth: 9 June 1984 (age 42)
- Place of birth: Al-Khaburah, Oman
- Height: 1.73 m (5 ft 8 in)
- Position: Center forward

Team information
- Current team: Al-Nahda

Youth career
- 2001–2004: Al-Khaboora

Senior career*
| Years | Team | Apps | (Gls) |
| 2004–2006 | Muscat | 11 | (2) |
| 2006–2007 | Al-Shamal | 20 | (12) |
| 2007–2008 | Umm Salal | 17 | (6) |
| 2008–2011 | Al-Kuwait | ? | (24) |
| 2011–2012 | Kazma | 20 | (8) |
| 2012–2013 | Al-Faisaly | 26 | (7) |
| 2013–2014 | Al-Nasr | ? | (9) |
| 2014 | Saham | ? | (0) |
| 2015–2016 | Al-Nahda | | |
| 2016–2017 | Al-Khaboora | | |

International career
| 2006–2014 | Oman | 84 | (15) |
- * Club domestic league appearances and goals

Ismail Sulaiman Ashoor Al-Ajmi (Arabic: إِسْمَاعِيل سُلَيْمَان عَاشُور الْعَجَمِيّ; born 9 June 1984), commonly known as Ismail Al-Ajmi, is an Omani footballer who plays for Al-Nahda Club in Oman Professional League.

== Club career ==
=== Muscat ===
In the 2005–06 Omani League, Ismail was given the 'Top Scorer' award for a total of 12 goals and hence helping his club to win the overall Championship.

=== Kuwait ===
Ismail's most valuable goal for Kuwait SC came in the Final of the 2009 AFC Cup. The goal was scored seconds before the referee's whistle. This goal meant that is the Champion of the AFC Cup of 2009.

=== Saham ===
On 25 September 2014, he signed a one-year contract with 2014 GCC Champions League runners-up Saham SC.

=== Al-Nahda ===
On 28 January 2015, he signed a six-month contract with 2014–15 Oman Professional League champions, Al-Nahda Club.

== International career ==
=== Arabian Gulf Cup ===
Ismail has made appearances in the 18th Arabian Gulf Cup, the 19th Arabian Gulf Cup, the 20th Arabian Gulf Cup and the 21st Arabian Gulf Cup.

=== AFC Asian Cup ===
Ismail has made appearances in the 2007 AFC Asian Cup qualification, the 2007 AFC Asian Cup, the 2011 AFC Asian Cup qualification and the 2015 AFC Asian Cup qualification.

In the 2007 AFC Asian Cup qualification, he scored four goals, a goal in a 3-0 win over Jordan, a goal in a 4-1 win over Pakistan, a goal in the return leg in a 5-0 win over Pakistan and another in a 2-1 win over the United Arab Emirates hence helping his team to qualify for the 2007 AFC Asian Cup. Badar Al-Maimani scored one and the only goal of Oman in the 2007 AFC Asian Cup in a 1-1 draw against Australia. In the tournament, Oman won two points in a 1-1 draw against Australia and in a 0-0 draw against Iraq and hence failed to qualify for the quarter-finals.

In the 2011 AFC Asian Cup qualification, he played in six matches and scored one goal in a 2-1 win over Indonesia. But Oman failed to qualify for the 2011 AFC Asian Cup.

He made four appearances in the 2015 AFC Asian Cup qualification but failed to score a single goal. He again helped his team to qualify for the 2015 AFC Asian Cup by finishing at the top of the Group A.

=== FIFA World Cup Qualification ===
Ismail has made seven appearances in the 2010 FIFA World Cup qualification and fifteen in the 2014 FIFA World Cup.

He scored two goals in the 2010 FIFA World Cup qualification, one in a 1-0 win over Thailand and another in a 1-1 draw against Bahrain.

He scored two goals in the 2014 FIFA World Cup qualification, one in the 2014 FIFA World Cup qualification – AFC second round|second round of FIFA World Cup qualification in a 2-0 win over Myanmar and another in the 2014 FIFA World Cup qualification – AFC fourth round|fourth round of FIFA World Cup qualification in a 1-0 win over Iraq. Oman entered the last game of group play with a chance to qualify for at least the playoff-round, but a 1-0 loss to Jordan eliminated them from contention.

== Career statistics ==
=== Club ===
| Club | Season | Division | League | | Cup | | Continental (Note: Includes appearances in the AFC Cup) | | Other (Note: Includes appearances in the GCC Champions League and Club Friendlies) | | Total | |
| Club | Season | Division | Apps | Goals | Apps | Goals | Apps | Goals | Apps | Goals | Apps | Goals |
|---|---|---|---|---|---|---|---|---|---|---|---|---|
| Muscat | 2005-06 | Omani League | 11 | 2 | 2 | 2 | 0 | 0 | 0 | 0 | 13 | 4 |
| Muscat | Total | | 11 | 2 | 2 | 2 | 0 | 0 | 0 | 0 | 13 | 4 |
| Al-Shamal | 2006–07 | Qatar Stars League | 20 | 12 | 0 | 0 | 0 | 0 | 0 | 0 | 20 | 12 |
| Al-Shamal | Total | | 20 | 12 | 0 | 0 | 0 | 0 | 0 | 0 | 20 | 12 |
| Umm Salal | 2007–08 | Qatar Stars League | 17 | 6 | 2 | 2 | 0 | 0 | 0 | 0 | 19 | 8 |
| Umm Salal | Total | | 17 | 6 | 2 | 2 | 0 | 0 | 0 | 0 | 19 | 8 |
| Al-Kuwait | 2008–09 | Kuwaiti Premier League | - | 4 | - | 5 | - | 3 | - | 0 | - | 9 |
| Al-Kuwait | 2009–10 | Kuwaiti Premier League | - | 13 | - | 7 | - | 0 | - | 3 | - | 26 |
| Al-Kuwait | 2010–11 | Kuwaiti Premier League | - | 7 | - | 3 | 7 | 2 | - | 0 | - | 12 |
| Al-Kuwait | Total | | - | 24 | - | 15 | - | 5 | - | 3 | - | 47 |
| Kazma | 2011–12 | Kuwaiti Premier League | - | 8 | - | 9 | 5 | 1 | 0 | 1 | - | 19 |
| Kazma | Total | | - | 8 | - | 9 | 5 | 1 | 0 | 1 | - | 19 |
| Al-Faisaly | 2012–13 | Saudi Professional League | 26 | 7 | 3 | 1 | 0 | 0 | 2 | 1 | 31 | 9 |
| Al-Faisaly | Total | | 26 | 7 | 3 | 1 | 0 | 0 | 2 | 1 | 31 | 9 |
| Al-Nasr | 2013–14 | Kuwaiti Premier League | - | 9 | 0 | 0 | 0 | 0 | 0 | 0 | - | 9 |
| Al-Nasr | Total | | - | 9 | 0 | 0 | 0 | 0 | 0 | 0 | - | 9 |
| Career total | | | - | 99 | - | 21 | 15 | 8 | - | 4 | 284 | 132 |

=== International ===
Scores and results list Oman's goal tally first.

| # | Date | Venue | Opponent | Score | Result | Competition |
|---|---|---|---|---|---|---|
| 1 | 28 December 2005 | Surakul Stadium, Phuket, Thailand | Latvia | 1–1 | 1-2 | 2005 King's Cup |
| 2 | 1 March 2006 | Royal Oman Police Stadium, Muscat, Oman | Jordan | 2–0 | 3–0 | 2007 AFC Asian Cup qualification |
| 3 | 16 August 2006 | Jinnah Sports Stadium, Islamabad, Pakistan | Pakistan | 4–1 | 4–1 | 2007 AFC Asian Cup qualification |
| 4 | 6 September 2006 | Sultan Qaboos Sports Complex, Muscat, Oman | Pakistan | 3–0 | 5–0 | 2007 AFC Asian Cup qualification |
| 5 | 11 October 2006 | Sultan Qaboos Sports Complex, Muscat, Oman | United Arab Emirates | 2–0 | 2–1 | 2007 AFC Asian Cup qualification |
| 6 | 28 June 2007 | Singapore, Singapore | North Korea | 2–2 | (P)2-2 | Friendly |
| 7 | 21 November 2007 | Muscat, Oman | Kenya | 1–0 | 2-2 | Friendly |
| 8 | 26 March 2008 | Rajamangala Stadium, Bangkok, Thailand | Thailand | 1–0 | 1–0 | 2010 FIFA World Cup qualification |
| 9 | 14 June 2008 | Bahrain National Stadium, Riffa, Bahrain | Bahrain | 1–1 | 1–1 | 2010 FIFA World Cup qualification |
| 10 | 10 September 2008 | Muscat, Oman | Zimbabwe | 2–1 | 3–2 | Friendly |
| 11 | 6 January 2010 | Gelora Bung Karno Stadium, Tanah Abang, Indonesia | Indonesia | 2–1 | 2–1 | 2011 AFC Asian Cup qualification |
| 12 | 23 July 2011 | Seeb Stadium, Seeb, Oman | Myanmar | 2–0 | 2–0 | 2014 FIFA World Cup qualification |
| 13 | 23 February 2012 | Sultan Qaboos Sports Complex, Muscat, Oman | India | 2–0 | 5–1 | Friendly |
| 14 | 23 February 2012 | Sultan Qaboos Sports Complex, Muscat, Oman | India | 3–0 | 5–1 | Friendly |
| 15 | 4 June 2013 | Sultan Qaboos Sports Complex, Muscat, Oman | Iraq | 1–0 | 1–0 | 2014 FIFA World Cup qualification |

== Honours ==
Kuwait SC

- AFC Cup: 2009
- Kuwait Federation Cup: 2009–10

Kazma

- Kuwait Federation Cup runner-up: 2011–12
- Kuwait Emir Cup runner-up: 2012
- Kuwait Super Cup runner-up: 2011

Individual

- Omani League top scorer: 2005–06
