= Bobby Ferguson (footballer, born 1938) =

English footballer and manager

Personal information
- Full name: Robert Burnitt Ferguson
- Date of birth: 8 January 1938
- Place of birth: Dudley, Northumberland, England
- Date of death: 28 March 2018 (aged 80)
- Position: Left back

Senior career*
| Years | Team | Apps | (Gls) |
| 1955–1962 | Newcastle United | 11 | (0) |
| 1962–1965 | Derby County | 121 | (0) |
| 1965–1969 | Cardiff City | 88 | (0) |
| 1969 | Barry Town | 23 | (2) |
| 1969–1970 | Newport County | 71 | (2) |
| Total | | 291 | (2) |

Managerial career
- 1969: Barry Town
- 1969–1970: Newport County
- 1982–1987: Ipswich Town
- 1987–1989: Al-Arabi
- * Club domestic league appearances and goals

Robert Burnitt Ferguson (8 January 1938 – 28 March 2018) was an English professional football player and manager. He was best known for his spell at Ipswich Town, as a coach and then manager, from 1970 to 1987. While at Ipswich, he was reserve team coach and first team coach in Bobby Robson's FA Cup and UEFA Cup-winning teams, and was appointed manager after Robson's exit.

== Playing career ==
Born in Dudley, Northumberland, Ferguson's father Robert and uncle Ted were both professional footballers. Having represented England at schoolboy level, he began his career with Newcastle United as a left back. He made only eleven league appearances over seven years as he was unable to displace Alf McMichael from the first-team.

He later played for Derby County before joining Cardiff City on 31 December 1965 for a fee of £5,000. With Cardiff, he reached the semi-finals of the 1967–68 European Cup Winners' Cup and made over 100 appearances in all competitions before losing his place in the side to Gary Bell. He joined Barry Town in January 1969 as player-manager. However, six months later he returned to the Football League in the same role at Newport County, signing for a fee of £250. Replacing Leslie Graham, he became the youngest manager in the Football League at the age of 31 but finished 21st in the Fourth Division in his first season. The club won re-election to stay in the Football League but a 6–1 defeat to Barnet in the FA Cup in November 1970 resulted in his dismissal.

== Coaching career ==
Ferguson was appointed by Bobby Robson into the coaching staff at Ipswich Town in 1970. He was coach of the Ipswich team than won the FA Youth Cup in 1973 and 1975, and as the reserve team coach he developed several young players including Terry Butcher and George Burley. While reserve team coach, Ferguson rejected the offer to manage Millwall. After Ipswich won the 1978 FA Cup Final, he replaced Cyril Lea as the first team coach, and the team went on to win the 1981 UEFA Cup Final.

In 1982, Robson left Ipswich to become England national football team manager, and Ferguson was named the new Ipswich manager. His tenure was marked by financial constraints due to the construction of the Pioneer Stand at the team's Portman Road stadium. After several near misses, the club were relegated in 1986, and Ferguson was given an ultimatum that he would be dismissed if Ipswich were not promoted immediately back; they lost 2–1 on aggregate to Charlton Athletic in the 1987 play-off semi-finals. Ferguson became the first Ipswich manager to be sacked.

After leaving Ipswich, Ferguson travelled to Kuwait to work as a coach for Al-Arabi SC, managed by the Scotsman Dave Mackay. On returning to England, he had the same role for Terry Butcher's Sunderland and Mackay's Birmingham City.

== Later life and death ==
Ferguson settled in Ipswich. He spent his later life watching Ipswich Town and races at Newmarket Racecourse, as well as playing golf. He and his wife Ann had a son and a daughter.

Ferguson died on 28 March 2018, at the age of 80.

== Honours ==
=== Player ===
Cardiff City

- Welsh Cup: 1967, 1968

=== Manager ===
Al-Arabi

- Kuwait Premier League: 1987–88, 1988–89

Individual

- Ipswich Town Hall of Fame: Inducted 2015
