= 1965–66 Kuwaiti Premier League =

- Season: 1965–66
- Dates: 15 October 1965 – 13 May 1966
- Champions: Al-Arabi (4th title)
- Matches: 30
- Goals: 134 (4.47 per match)
- Top goalscorer: Abdulrahman Al-Dawla
- Highest scoring: Al-Arabi 9–1 Al-Shabab (15 October 1965); Qadsia 10–0 Al-Shabab (14 January 1966)

1965–66 Kuwaiti Premier League was the 5th season of the First League Division.

== Overview ==
This season was played similar to the previous season, where the same clubs participated in the league table. Al Arabi managed to win its fifth title, and its second title without any defeat.

== League table ==
Pos	Team	Pld	W	D	L	GF	GA	GD	Pts
1	Al-Arabi (C)	10	9	1	0	38	5	+33	19
2	Al-Qadsia	10	6	3	1	35	9	+26	15
3	Al-Kuwait	10	4	4	2	21	12	+9	12
4	Al-Salmiya	10	3	1	6	14	31	−17	7
5	Al-Fahaheel	10	2	2	6	20	25	−5	6
6	Al-Shabab	10	0	1	9	6	52	−46	1

Source: Goalzz
(C) Champions
