= 2013–14 Kuwaiti Premier League =

Kuwaiti Premier League
- Season: 2013–14
- Champions: Al Qadsia SC
- Matches: 182
- Goals: 552 (3.03 per match)

The 2013–14 Kuwaiti Premier League season was the 52nd since the league's establishment. This season in the Kuwaiti Premier League, there were 14 teams. This was the first time there had been 14 teams since the 2005–06 season. Kuwait SC came into this tournament as defending champion after they won the title last season following four seasons without a league title.

== Teams ==
This season's Kuwaiti Premier League featured all 14 teams of the football pyramid, combining both the Premier League and Division One together, a structure last used in the 2005–06 Kuwaiti Premier League season. Fourteen teams played each other twice to determine the league champions.

Therefore, Kazma, who came bottom in the 2012–13 campaign avoided relegation. The end-of-season playoff between Al Salmiya and Al Shabab in which Al Salmiya won, thus didn't matter.

Teams joining the top flight are Khaitan (back after relegation in 2005–06), Al Fahaheel (back after relegation in 2006–07), Al Sahel (back after relegation in 2010–11), Al Shabab (back after relegation in 2011–12), Al Yarmouk (back after relegation in 2005–06), and Al Tadamun (back after relegation in 2009–10).

Locations of teams in the 2013–14 Kuwaiti Premier League

=== Stadia and locations ===
Note: Table lists in alphabetical order.

Team	Stadium	Capacity
Al Arabi	Sabah Al-Salem Stadium	22,000
Al Fahaheel	Nayif Daboos Stadium	3,000
Al Jahra	Al Shabab Mubarak Alaiar Stadium	17,000
Al Kuwait	Al Kuwait Sports Club Stadium	18,000
Al Naser	Ali Al-Salem Al-Sabah Stadium	10,000
Al Qadsia	Mohammed Al-Hamad Stadium	22,000
Al Sahel	Abu Halifa City Stadium	5,000
Al Salibikhaet	Al Salibikhaet Stadium	7,000
Al Salmiya	Thamir Stadium	16,100
Al Shabab	Al-Ahmadi Stadium	18,000
Al Tadamun	Farwaniya Stadium	14,000
Al Yarmouk	Mishref Stadium	12,000
Kazma	Al-Sadaqua Walsalam Stadium	21,500
Khaitan	Khaitan Stadium	3,000

== Standings ==
Pos	Team	Pld	W	D	L	GF	GA	GD	Pts	Qualification
1	Qadsia SC (C)	26	21	5	0	66	14	+52	68	Qualification to the 2015 AFC Champions League Preliminary Round
2	Al Kuwait	26	20	4	2	67	19	+48	64	Qualification to the 2015 AFC Cup Group Stage
3	Al Jahra	26	17	4	5	46	35	+11	55	Qualification to the 2015 GCC Champions League Group Stage
4	Kazma SC	26	15	7	4	42	26	+16	52	Qualification to the 2015 GCC Champions League Group Stage
5	Al-Arabi	26	12	7	7	53	29	+24	43	
6	Al-Salmiya	26	11	4	11	54	47	+7	37	
7	Al Tadamun	26	11	3	12	45	47	−2	36	
8	Al-Nasr	26	9	6	11	40	42	−2	33	
9	Khaitan	26	8	4	14	23	44	−21	28	
10	Al Yarmouk	26	7	6	13	21	41	−20	27	
11	Al Salibikhaet	26	4	7	15	27	51	−24	19	
12	Al-Shabab	26	4	6	16	19	48	−29	18	
13	Al Sahel	26	5	3	18	28	51	−23	18	
14	Fahaheel	26	3	4	19	21	58	−37	13	

Updated to match(es) played on 25 April 2013. Source:
Rules for classification: 1) points; 2) goal difference; 3) number of goals scored.
(C) Champions
