= 1961–62 Kuwaiti Premier League =

- Season: 1961–62
- Dates: 10 November 1961 – ? ? 1962
- Champions: Al-Arabi (1st title)
- Matches: 42
- Goals: 232 (5.52 per match)
- Top goalscorer: Khalifa Al-Shatti; Saleh Zakaria (21 goals each)
- Highest scoring: Al-Kalia Al-Saneia 14–2 Thanwit Kifan

1961–62 Kuwaiti Premier League was the inaugural season of the First League Division.

== Overview ==
The first season of the Kuwaiti League officially started after the closure of the old clubs and the opening of a new football activity, with the participation of seven new teams between clubs and schools, namely (Al-Arabi, Al-Qadsia, Al-Kuwait, Thanwit Kifan (English: Kaifan High School), Thanwit Al-Shoike (English: Al-Shuwaikh High School), Al-Kalia Al-Saneia (English: The Industrial College) and Al-Shorta (English: The Police)). The first home-and-away system was held, and Al-Arabi was able to register his name as the first club to win the league championship without drawing or losing by 7 points from Al-Qadsia (Perfect season), scoring 42 goals and conceding only 10 goals.

== League table ==
Pos	Team	Pld	W	D	L	GF	GA	GD	Pts
1	Al-Arabi (C)	12	12	0	0	42	10	+32	24
2	Al-Qadsia	12	8	1	3	39	17	+22	17
3	Al-Kuwait	12	7	0	5	43	24	+19	14
4	Thanwit Al-Shoike	12	5	0	7	30	33	−3	10
5	Al-Kalia Al-Saneia	12	4	1	7	39	38	+1	9
6	Al-Shorta	12	3	1	8	27	37	−10	7
7	Thanwit Kifan	12	1	1	10	12	73	−61	3

Source: Goalzz
(C) Champions
