= 1991–92 Kuwaiti Premier League =

- Season: 1991–92

Statistics of Kuwaiti Premier League for the 1991–92 season.

== Overview ==
It was contested by 14 teams, and Al Qadisiya Kuwait won the championship.

== Group stage ==
=== Group A ===
Pos	Team	Pld	W	D	L	GF	GA	GD	Pts
1	Al Qadisiya Kuwait	12	8	1	3	20	6	+14	17
2	Al Yarmouk	12	6	3	3	15	7	+8	15
3	Al Jahra	12	5	4	3	15	9	+6	14
4	Kazma Sporting Club	12	5	3	4	10	8	+2	13
5	Fahaheel	12	4	2	6	8	14	−6	10
6	Tadamon	12	3	3	6	9	16	−7	9
7	Khaitan	12	1	4	7	4	21	−17	6

Source: rsssf.com

=== Group B ===
Pos	Team	Pld	W	D	L	GF	GA	GD	Pts
1	Al Salmiya Club	12	10	2	0	22	5	+17	22
2	Al Arabi Kuwait	12	9	2	1	19	5	+14	20
3	Al Kuwait Kaifan	12	7	2	3	20	12	+8	16
4	Al Naser Sporting Club	12	6	2	4	15	12	+3	14
5	Sulaibikhat	12	4	0	8	12	22	−10	8
6	Sahel	12	1	1	10	8	22	−14	3
7	Al-Shabab	12	0	1	11	7	25	−18	1

Source: rsssf.com

== Championship Playoffs ==
=== Semifinals ===
- Al Salmiya Club 0–1 Al Yarmouk
- Al Qadisiya Kuwait 1–0 Al Arabi Kuwait

=== Third place match ===
- Al Salmiya Club 2–1 Al Arabi Kuwait

=== Final ===
- Al Qadisiya Kuwait 2–0 Al Yarmouk
