= 1998–99 Kuwaiti Premier League =

- Season: 1998–99
- Champions: Qadsiya Kuwait
- Matches: 151
- Goals: 430 (2.85 per match)

Statistics of Kuwaiti Premier League for the 1998–99 season.

== Overview ==
It was contested by 14 teams, and Al Qadisiya Kuwait won the championship.

== First stage ==
| Pos | Team | Pld | W | D | L | GF | GA | GD | Pts |
|---|---|---|---|---|---|---|---|---|---|
| 1 | Al Qadisiya Kuwait | 13 | 8 | 4 | 1 | 21 | 6 | +15 | 28 |
| 2 | Tadamon | 13 | 6 | 4 | 3 | 20 | 15 | +5 | 22 |
| 3 | Al Naser Sporting Club | 13 | 6 | 3 | 4 | 20 | 16 | +4 | 21 |
| 4 | Al Kuwait Kaifan | 13 | 5 | 5 | 3 | 28 | 19 | +9 | 20 |
| 5 | Al Salmiya Club | 13 | 5 | 4 | 4 | 17 | 16 | +1 | 19 |
| 6 | Sulaibikhat | 13 | 6 | 1 | 6 | 14 | 22 | −8 | 19 |
| 7 | Sahel | 13 | 4 | 6 | 3 | 18 | 15 | +3 | 18 |
| 8 | Al Yarmouk | 13 | 5 | 3 | 5 | 14 | 18 | −4 | 18 |
| 9 | Al-Shabab | 13 | 3 | 7 | 3 | 14 | 15 | −1 | 16 |
| 10 | Kazma Sporting Club | 13 | 4 | 3 | 6 | 19 | 14 | +5 | 15 |
| 11 | Al Arabi Kuwait | 13 | 4 | 3 | 6 | 13 | 15 | −2 | 15 |
| 12 | Al Jahra | 13 | 4 | 2 | 7 | 11 | 18 | −7 | 14 |
| 13 | Khaitan | 13 | 3 | 3 | 7 | 10 | 19 | −9 | 12 |
| 14 | Fahaheel | 13 | 3 | 2 | 8 | 13 | 24 | −11 | 11 |

== Second stage ==
=== Group 1 ===
| Pos | Team | Pld | W | D | L | GF | GA | GD | BP | Pts |
|---|---|---|---|---|---|---|---|---|---|---|
| 1 | Al Qadisiya Kuwait | 6 | 3 | 1 | 2 | 9 | 8 | +1 | 3 | 13 |
| 2 | Al Kuwait Kaifan | 6 | 3 | 1 | 2 | 11 | 8 | +3 | 0 | 10 |
| 3 | Tadamon | 6 | 2 | 2 | 2 | 3 | 3 | 0 | 2 | 10 |
| 4 | Al Naser Sporting Club | 6 | 2 | 0 | 4 | 8 | 12 | −4 | 1 | 7 |

=== Group 2 ===
| Pos | Team | Pld | W | D | L | GF | GA | GD | BP | Pts |
|---|---|---|---|---|---|---|---|---|---|---|
| 1 | Al Salmiya Club | 8 | 5 | 1 | 2 | 19 | 12 | +7 | 3 | 19 |
| 2 | Al Yarmouk | 8 | 5 | 0 | 3 | 15 | 10 | +5 | 1 | 16 |
| 3 | Sahel | 8 | 4 | 2 | 2 | 14 | 9 | +5 | 2 | 16 |
| 4 | Al-Shabab | 8 | 3 | 1 | 4 | 14 | 15 | −1 | 0 | 10 |
| 5 | Sulaibikhat | 8 | 1 | 0 | 7 | 9 | 25 | −16 | 0 | 3 |

=== Group 3 ===
| Pos | Team | Pld | W | D | L | GF | GA | GD | BP | Pts |
|---|---|---|---|---|---|---|---|---|---|---|
| 1 | Al Arabi Kuwait | 8 | 5 | 2 | 1 | 18 | 7 | +11 | 2 | 19 |
| 2 | Kazma Sporting Club | 8 | 5 | 1 | 2 | 19 | 9 | +10 | 3 | 19 |
| 3 | Al Jahra | 8 | 5 | 1 | 2 | 17 | 14 | +3 | 1 | 17 |
| 4 | Fahaheel | 8 | 1 | 2 | 5 | 11 | 23 | −12 | 0 | 5 |
| 5 | Khaitan | 8 | 0 | 2 | 6 | 6 | 18 | −12 | 0 | 2 |

== Championship play-offs ==
=== Quarterfinals ===
11 June 1999

| Al Qadisiya Kuwait | 3–2 | Al Arabi Kuwait |

12 June 1999

| Al Naser Sporting Club | 1–4 | Al Salmiya Club |

12 June 1999

| Al Kuwait Kaifan | 1–0 | Sahel |

13 June 1999

| Tadamon | 2–1 [asdet] | Al Yarmouk |

=== Semifinals ===
17 June 1999

| Al Qadisiya Kuwait | 2–1 | Al Salmiya Club |

18 June 1999

| Al Kuwait Kaifan | 1–2 | Tadamon |

=== Third place match ===
22 June 1999

| Al Salmiya Club | 1–3 | Al Kuwait Kaifan |
|---|---|---|
| Ali Marwi 28' (pen.) | | Badr al-Kandari 60'; John Malek 70'; Adel Aqla 90' (pen.) |

=== Final ===
22 June 1999

| Al Qadisiya Kuwait | 1–0 | Tadamon |
|---|---|---|
| Hamad al-Saleh 90' |
