= 1963–64 Kuwaiti Premier League =

- Season: 1963–64
- Dates: 18 October 1963 – 24 April 1964
- Champions: Al-Arabi (3rd title)
- Matches: 30
- Goals: 137 (4.57 per match)
- Top goalscorer: Othman Al-Ossimi (17 goals)
- Highest scoring: Al-Arabi 9–0 Al-Shorta (18 October 1963); Thanwit Al-Shoike 8–1 Al-Kalia Al-Saneia (18 October 1963); Al-Shorta 5–4 Thanwit Al-Shoike (4 March 1964)

1963–64 Kuwaiti Premier League was the 3rd season of the First League Division.

== Overview ==
In the third season, it almost witnessed the end of Al Arabi's monopoly on the title after a great competition with Al-Qadsia and the participation of the same six teams in the previous season. Al-Arabi and Al-Qadsia were equal on points after Al-Qadsia inflicted the first defeat of Al-Arabi 2–0 in the last match in the league, and they were equal on points with 18 points for both teams, with Al-Arabi an advantage by goal difference. In the deciding match to determine the league champion, Al-Arabi managed to maintain its title after defeating Al-Qadsia 2–1 to achieve the third title in a row, scoring 42 goals and conceding 9 goals.

== League table ==
Pos	Team	Pld	W	D	L	GF	GA	GD	Pts	Qualification or relegation
1	Al-Arabi (C)	10	9	0	1	40	8	+32	18	Participants in the Championship play-off
2	Al-Qadsia	10	9	0	1	34	7	+27	18	Participants in the Championship play-off
3	Al-Kuwait	10	4	2	4	12	14	−2	10	
4	Thanwit Al-Shoike	10	3	2	5	29	25	+4	8	
5	Al-Shorta	10	1	2	7	13	41	−28	4	
6	Al-Kalia Al-Saneia	10	0	2	8	9	42	−33	2	

Source: Goalzz
(C) Champions

== Championship play-off ==
1 May 1964

Al-Arabi	2–1	Qadsia
