= 1992–93 Kuwaiti Premier League =

- Season: 1992–93

Statistics of Kuwaiti Premier League for the 1992–93 season.

== Overview ==
It was contested by 8 teams, and Al Arabi Kuwait won the championship.

== League standings ==
| Pos | Team | Pld | W | D | L | GF | GA | GD | Pts |
|---|---|---|---|---|---|---|---|---|---|
| 1 | Al Arabi Kuwait | 14 | 8 | 5 | 1 | 19 | 6 | +13 | 29 |
| 2 | Al Salmiya Club | 14 | 8 | 3 | 3 | 29 | 7 | +22 | 27 |
| 3 | Al Qadisiya Kuwait | 14 | 7 | 6 | 1 | 21 | 10 | +11 | 27 |
| 4 | Kazma Sporting Club | 14 | 4 | 8 | 2 | 11 | 9 | +2 | 20 |
| 5 | Al Jahra | 14 | 3 | 6 | 5 | 12 | 18 | −6 | 15 |
| 6 | Al Kuwait Kaifan | 14 | 3 | 5 | 6 | 18 | 22 | −4 | 14 |
| 7 | Al Yarmouk | 14 | 2 | 5 | 7 | 5 | 18 | −13 | 11 |
| 8 | Fahaheel | 14 | 0 | 4 | 10 | 6 | 31 | −25 | 4 |

Source: rsssf.com
