= 1966–67 Kuwaiti Premier League =

- Season: 1966-67
- Champions: Al-Arabi

1966–67 Kuwaiti Premier League was the 6th season of the First League Division.

== Overview ==
Al-Arabi won the championship.

== League table ==
| Pos | Team | Pld | W | D | L | GF | GA | GD | Pts | Qualification or relegation |
|---|---|---|---|---|---|---|---|---|---|---|
| 1 | Al-Arabi (C) | 10 | 7 | 2 | 1 | 22 | 6 | +16 | 16 | Champions |
| 2 | Al-Qadsia | 10 | 6 | 2 | 2 | 29 | 14 | +15 | 14 | |
| 3 | Al-Kuwait | 10 | 6 | 0 | 4 | 21 | 23 | −2 | 12 | |
| 4 | Al-Salmiya | 10 | 4 | 1 | 5 | 25 | 21 | +4 | 9 | |
| 5 | Al-Fahaheel | 10 | 2 | 1 | 7 | 11 | 26 | −15 | 5 | |
| 6 | Khaitan | 10 | 1 | 2 | 7 | 8 | 26 | −18 | 4 | Relegated |

(C) Champions
