= 1962–63 Kuwaiti Premier League =

- Season: 1962–63
- Champions: Al-Arabi (2nd title)
- Matches: 30
- Goals: 147 (4.9 per match)
- Top goalscorer: Abdulrahman Al-Dawla
- Highest scoring: Al-Arabi 10–0 Al-Shorta

1962–63 Kuwaiti Premier League was the 2nd season of the First League Division.

== Overview ==
In the second season, the number of teams was reduced to six after the Thanwit Kifan (English: Kaifan High School) moved away, and the league was played on a home-and-away system as well. Al Arabi managed to win the second title in a row after scoring eighteen points, three points ahead of its rivals Al-Qadsia, scoring 45 goals and conceding only 6 goals.

== League table ==
Pos	Team	Pld	W	D	L	GF	GA	GD	Pts
1	Al-Arabi (C)	10	8	2	0	45	6	+39	18
2	Al-Qadsia	10	7	1	2	26	11	+15	15
3	Al-Kuwait	10	5	1	4	30	21	+9	11
4	Thanwit Al-Shoike	10	3	2	5	21	27	−6	8
5	Al-Shorta	10	2	1	7	11	36	−25	5
6	Al-Kalia Al-Saneia	10	1	1	8	14	46	−32	3

Source: Goalzz
(C) Champions
