= 1983–84 Kuwaiti Premier League =

- Season: 1983–84

Statistics of Kuwaiti Premier League for the 1983–84 season.

== Overview ==
It was contested by 14 teams, and Al Arabi Kuwait won the championship.

== League standings ==
Pos	Team	Pld	W	D	L	GF	GA	GD	Pts
1	Al Arabi Kuwait	26	20	5	1	67	13	+54	65
2	Al Salmiya Club	26	19	5	2	43	16	+27	62
3	Kazma Sporting Club	26	17	5	4	68	20	+48	56
4	Al Kuwait Kaifan	26	16	6	4	53	21	+32	54
5	Al Qadisiya Kuwait	26	14	7	5	49	26	+23	49
6	Tadamon	26	12	5	9	40	35	+5	41
7	Al-Shabab	26	7	9	10	39	46	−7	30
8	Naser	26	5	13	8	27	33	−6	28
9	Fahaheel	26	7	6	13	25	45	−20	27
10	Sahel	26	6	5	15	24	44	−20	23
11	Sulaibikhat	26	6	3	17	35	59	−24	21
12	Al Yarmouk	26	5	5	16	26	56	−30	20
13	Khaitan	26	4	8	14	18	48	−30	20
14	Al Jahra	26	0	6	20	17	69	−52	6

Source: rsssf.com
