= 1984–85 Kuwaiti Premier League =

- Season: 1984–85

Statistics of Kuwaiti Premier League for the 1984–85 season.

== Overview ==
It was contested by 14 teams, and Al Arabi Kuwait won the championship.

== League standings ==
Pos	Team	Pld	W	D	L	GF	GA	GD	Pts
1	Al Arabi Kuwait	26	21	4	1	47	7	+40	67
2	Al Kuwait Kaifan	26	18	8	0	65	13	+52	62
3	Kazma Sporting Club	26	16	6	4	44	22	+22	54
4	Al Salmiya Club	26	12	8	6	41	24	+17	44
5	Al Qadisiya Kuwait	26	12	5	9	55	32	+23	41
6	Tadamon	26	11	7	8	35	33	+2	40
7	Al Jahra	26	10	7	9	37	33	+4	37
8	Al Yarmouk	26	10	5	11	32	37	−5	35
9	Fahaheel	26	7	10	9	32	31	+1	31
10	Al-Shabab	26	8	6	12	35	42	−7	30
11	Sahel	26	6	4	16	21	45	−24	22
12	Naser	26	4	5	17	30	57	−27	17
13	Khaitan	26	3	7	16	24	57	−33	16
14	Sulaibikhat	26	2	2	22	14	79	−65	8

Source: rsssf.com
