= 1972–73 Kuwaiti Premier League =

- Season: 1972–73

Statistics of Kuwaiti Premier League in the 1972–73 season.

== Overview ==
Al Qadisiya Kuwait won the championship.

== League table ==
Pos	Team	Pld	W	D	L	GF	GA	GD	Pts	Qualification or relegation
1	Al-Qadsia (C)	12	8	3	1	30	12	+18	19	Champions
2	Al-Arabi	12	6	3	3	30	22	+8	15	
3	Kazma	12	4	5	3	20	14	+6	13	
4	Al-Kuwait	12	4	5	3	15	13	+2	13	
5	Al-Yarmouk	12	4	4	4	24	23	+1	12	
6	Al Salmiya Club	12	3	4	5	20	22	−2	10	
7	Khaitan (R)	12	0	2	10	11	44	−33	2	Relegated

(C) Champions; (R) Relegated
