= 1996–97 Kuwaiti Premier League =

- Season: 1996–97
- Champions: Al Arabi

Statistics of Kuwaiti Premier League for the 1996–97 season.

== Overview ==
It was contested by 13 teams, and Al Arabi Kuwait won the championship.

== League standings ==
Pos	Team	Pld	W	D	L	GF	GA	GD	Pts
1	Al Arabi Kuwait	24	15	3	6	37	24	+13	48
2	Kazma Sporting Club	24	14	5	5	41	23	+18	47
3	Al Naser Sporting Club	24	13	7	4	41	19	+22	46
4	Al Salmiya Club	24	13	6	5	39	22	+17	45
5	Al Kuwait Kaifan	24	11	6	7	33	28	+5	39
6	Al Yarmouk	24	5	12	7	31	34	−3	27
7	Tadamon	24	7	6	11	26	37	−11	27
8	Sahel	24	6	8	10	29	32	−3	26
9	Khaitan	24	7	5	12	21	29	−8	26
10	Al Jahra	24	7	5	12	36	46	−10	26
11	Fahaheel	24	8	2	14	30	46	−16	26
12	Al-Shabab	24	5	8	11	28	45	−17	23
13	Sulaibikhat	24	5	7	12	29	36	−7	22

Source: rsssf.com

== Semifinals ==
- Al Arabi Kuwait 3–2 : 0–0 Al Salmiya Club
- Kazma Sporting Club 1–1 : 0–3 Al Naser Sporting Club

== Third place match ==
- Kazma Sporting Club 1–0 Al Salmiya Club

== Final ==
- Al Arabi Kuwait 1–0 Al Naser Sporting Club
