= 1985–86 Kuwaiti Premier League =

- Season: 1985–86

Statistics of Kuwaiti Premier League for the 1985–86 season.

== Overview ==
It was contested by 7 teams, and Kazma Sporting Club won the championship.

== League standings ==
Pos	Team	Pld	W	D	L	GF	GA	GD	Pts
1	Kazma Sporting Club	12	8	2	2	21	8	+13	26
2	Al Qadisiya Kuwait	12	7	3	2	20	10	+10	24
3	Al Arabi Kuwait	12	5	4	3	11	10	+1	19
4	Al Kuwait Kaifan	12	4	4	4	16	17	−1	16
5	Fahaheel	12	4	2	6	13	15	−2	14
6	Al Salmiya Club	12	2	5	5	7	14	−7	11
7	Al Yarmouk	12	1	2	9	10	24	−14	5

Source: rsssf.com
