= 1993–94 Kuwaiti Premier League =

== Background ==
1993–94 Kuwaiti Premier League
- Season: 1993–94

The 1993–94 Kuwaiti Premier League was contested by 8 teams, and Kazma Sporting Club won the championship.

== Group stage ==
=== Group A ===
Pos	Team	Pld	W	D	L	GF	GA	GD	Pts
1	Kazma Sporting Club	6	3	2	1	13	6	+7	11
2	Al Arabi Kuwait	6	3	2	1	9	4	+5	11
3	Tadamon	6	2	2	2	3	4	−1	8
4	Al Yarmouk	6	0	2	4	1	12	−11	2

=== Group B ===
Pos	Team	Pld	W	D	L	GF	GA	GD	Pts
1	Al Qadisiya Kuwait	6	4	0	2	13	8	+5	12
2	Al Jahra	6	2	2	2	9	8	+1	8
3	Al Salmiya Club	6	2	2	2	5	5	0	8
4	Al Naser Sporting Club	6	1	2	3	5	11	−6	5

== Championship Playoffs ==
=== Third place match ===
- Al Jahra 1–1 (pen 5-4) Al Arabi Kuwait

=== Final ===
- Kazma Sporting Club 2–0 Al Qadisiya Kuwait
