= 1994–95 Kuwaiti Premier League =

- Season: 1994–95
- Champions: Al Salmiya Club

Statistics of Kuwaiti Premier League for the 1994–95 season.

== Overview ==
It was contested by 14 teams, and Al Salmiya Club won the championship.

== League standings ==
Pos	Team	Pld	W	D	L	GF	GA	GD	Pts
1	Al Salmiya Club	26	20	3	3	55	17	+38	63
2	Al Qadisiya Kuwait	26	17	5	4	51	23	+28	56
3	Kazma Sporting Club	26	14	8	4	44	21	+23	50
4	Al Jahra	26	14	7	5	50	22	+28	49
5	Al Kuwait Kaifan	26	11	8	7	36	28	+8	41
6	Al Arabi Kuwait	26	10	10	6	38	29	+9	40
7	Al Yarmouk	26	8	8	10	32	35	−3	32
8	Khaitan	26	8	7	11	40	43	−3	31
9	Tadamon	26	7	7	12	38	41	−3	28
10	Sahel	26	6	8	12	21	41	−20	26
11	Fahaheel	26	5	10	11	27	41	−14	25
12	Al Naser Sporting Club	26	5	9	12	21	33	−12	24
13	Sulaibikhat	26	6	6	14	29	54	−25	24
14	Al-Shabab	26	0	6	20	12	66	−54	6

Source: rsssf.com
