= 1995–96 Kuwaiti Premier League =

- Season: 1995–96
- Champions: Kazma
- Matches: 121
- Goals: 325 (2.69 per match)

Statistics of Kuwaiti Premier League for the 1995–96 season.

== Overview ==
It was contested by 14 teams, and Kazma Sporting Club won the championship.

== League standings ==
| Pos | Team | Pld | W | D | L | GF | GA | GD | Pts |
|---|---|---|---|---|---|---|---|---|---|
| 1 | Kazma Sporting Club | 13 | 9 | 3 | 1 | 37 | 5 | +32 | 30 |
| 2 | Al Qadisiya Kuwait | 13 | 8 | 3 | 2 | 22 | 16 | +6 | 27 |
| 3 | Khaitan | 13 | 7 | 4 | 2 | 16 | 9 | +7 | 25 |
| 4 | Al Arabi Kuwait | 13 | 7 | 3 | 3 | 16 | 9 | +7 | 24 |
| 5 | Al Naser Sporting Club | 13 | 6 | 4 | 3 | 19 | 12 | +7 | 22 |
| 6 | Al Salmiya Club | 13 | 6 | 3 | 4 | 22 | 16 | +6 | 21 |
| 7 | Al Yarmouk | 13 | 5 | 4 | 4 | 22 | 13 | +9 | 19 |
| 8 | Tadamon | 13 | 5 | 2 | 6 | 21 | 22 | −1 | 17 |
| 9 | Sahel | 13 | 5 | 2 | 6 | 14 | 18 | −4 | 17 |
| 10 | Al Kuwait Kaifan | 13 | 4 | 4 | 5 | 15 | 18 | −3 | 16 |
| 11 | Al Jahra | 13 | 4 | 3 | 6 | 18 | 16 | +2 | 15 |
| 12 | Fahaheel | 13 | 4 | 1 | 8 | 9 | 22 | −13 | 13 |
| 13 | Al-Shabab | 13 | 1 | 1 | 11 | 5 | 29 | −24 | 4 |
| 14 | Sulaibikhat | 13 | 1 | 1 | 11 | 8 | 39 | −31 | 4 |

Source: rsssf.com

== Championship playoff ==
| Pos | Team | Pld | W | D | L | GF | GA | GD | BP | Pts |
|---|---|---|---|---|---|---|---|---|---|---|
| 1 | Kazma Sporting Club | 10 | 6 | 3 | 1 | 15 | 5 | +10 | 3 | 24 |
| 2 | Al Salmiya Club | 10 | 6 | 4 | 0 | 19 | 8 | +11 | 0 | 22 |
| 3 | Al Qadisiya Kuwait | 10 | 3 | 4 | 3 | 15 | 16 | −1 | 2 | 15 |
| 4 | Al Arabi Kuwait | 10 | 2 | 4 | 4 | 13 | 16 | −3 | 0 | 10 |
| 5 | Khaitan | 10 | 1 | 5 | 4 | 9 | 19 | −10 | 1 | 9 |
| 6 | Al Naser Sporting Club | 10 | 0 | 4 | 6 | 10 | 17 | −7 | 0 | 4 |

Source: rsssf.com
