= 1969–70 Kuwaiti Premier League =

- Season: 1969-70
- Champions: Al-Arabi

1969–70 Kuwaiti Premier League was the 9th season of the First League Division.

== Overview ==
Al-Arabi won the championship.

== League table ==
Pos	Team	Pld	W	D	L	GF	GA	GD	Pts	Qualification or relegation
1	Al-Arabi (C)	10	7	1	2	21	12	+9	15	Champions
2	Al-Kuwait	10	6	1	3	19	11	+8	13	
3	Al-Qadsia	10	3	3	4	20	21	−1	9	
4	Kazma	10	3	3	4	14	18	−4	9	
5	Al-Yarmouk	10	3	2	5	11	17	−6	8	
6	Al-Salmiya (R)	10	3	0	7	11	17	−6	6	Relegated

(C) Champions; (R) Relegated
