= 1997–98 Kuwaiti Premier League =

- Season: 1997–98
- Champions: Al-Salmiya
- Matches: 182
- Goals: 493 (2.71 per match)

Statistics of Kuwaiti Premier League for the 1997–98 season.

== Overview ==
It was contested by 14 teams, and Al Salmiya Club won the championship.

== League standings ==
Pos	Team	Pld	W	D	L	GF	GA	GD	Pts
1	Al Salmiya Club	26	20	4	2	65	18	+47	64
2	Kazma Sporting Club	26	17	4	5	54	24	+30	55
3	Al Qadisiya Kuwait	26	15	5	6	39	20	+19	50
4	Al Naser Sporting Club	26	14	3	9	39	33	+6	45
5	Tadamon	26	11	7	8	40	32	+8	40
6	Al Yarmouk	26	10	10	6	29	22	+7	40
7	Al Kuwait Kaifan	26	11	5	10	34	27	+7	38
8	Al Jahra	26	11	4	11	30	30	0	37
9	Al Arabi Kuwait	26	9	8	9	40	28	+12	35
10	Khaitan	26	8	7	11	34	43	−9	31
11	Sahel	26	5	7	14	32	55	−23	22
12	Fahaheel	26	6	4	16	24	54	−30	22
13	Sulaibikhat	26	5	5	16	23	53	−30	20
14	Al-Shabab	26	2	3	21	10	54	−44	9

Source: rsssf.com
