= 1968–69 Kuwaiti Premier League =

- Season: 1968-69
- Champions: Al-Qadsia

1968–69 Kuwaiti Premier League was the 8th season of the First League Division.

== Overview ==
Al-Qadsia won the championship.

== League table ==
| Pos | Team | Pld | W | D | L | GF | GA | GD | Pts | Qualification or relegation |
|---|---|---|---|---|---|---|---|---|---|---|
| 1 | Al-Qadsia (C) | 10 | 5 | 5 | 0 | 20 | 9 | +11 | 15 | Champions |
| 2 | Al-Arabi | 10 | 6 | 1 | 3 | 18 | 11 | +7 | 13 | |
| 3 | Al-Salmiya | 10 | 4 | 2 | 4 | 14 | 13 | +1 | 10 | |
| 4 | Al-Kuwait | 10 | 4 | 2 | 4 | 10 | 10 | 0 | 10 | |
| 5 | Al-Yarmouk | 10 | 4 | 0 | 6 | 9 | 14 | −5 | 8 | |
| 6 | Al-Fahaheel | 10 | 2 | 0 | 8 | 6 | 20 | −14 | 4 | Relegated |

(C) Champions
