= 1999–2000 Kuwaiti Premier League =

- Season: 1999–2000
- Champions: Al-Salmiya
- Matches: 121
- Goals: 351 (2.9 per match)

Statistics of Kuwaiti Premier League for the 1999–2000 season.

== Overview ==
It was contested by 14 teams, and Al Salmiya Club won the championship.

== League standings ==
| Pos | Team | Pld | W | D | L | GF | GA | GD | Pts |
|---|---|---|---|---|---|---|---|---|---|
| 1 | Tadamon | 13 | 7 | 2 | 4 | 20 | 15 | +5 | 23 |
| 2 | Al Salmiya Club | 13 | 6 | 4 | 3 | 27 | 13 | +14 | 22 |
| 3 | Kazma Sporting Club | 13 | 6 | 4 | 3 | 14 | 8 | +6 | 22 |
| 4 | Al Kuwait Kaifan | 13 | 5 | 6 | 2 | 22 | 13 | +9 | 21 |
| 5 | Al Jahra | 13 | 6 | 3 | 4 | 22 | 16 | +6 | 21 |
| 6 | Al Qadisiya Kuwait | 13 | 6 | 3 | 4 | 19 | 14 | +5 | 21 |
| 7 | Fahaheel | 13 | 5 | 6 | 2 | 20 | 16 | +4 | 21 |
| 8 | Al Naser Sporting Club | 13 | 5 | 5 | 3 | 19 | 18 | +1 | 20 |
| 9 | Al Arabi Kuwait | 13 | 4 | 7 | 2 | 21 | 14 | +7 | 19 |
| 10 | Al Yarmouk | 13 | 5 | 4 | 4 | 15 | 17 | −2 | 19 |
| 11 | Al-Shabab | 13 | 4 | 2 | 7 | 16 | 25 | −9 | 14 |
| 12 | Khaitan | 13 | 3 | 3 | 7 | 13 | 18 | −5 | 12 |
| 13 | Sulaibikhat | 13 | 1 | 3 | 9 | 9 | 34 | −25 | 6 |
| 14 | Sahel | 13 | 1 | 2 | 10 | 7 | 23 | −16 | 5 |

Source: rsssf.com

== Championship playoff ==
| Pos | Team | Pld | W | D | L | GF | GA | GD | Pts |
|---|---|---|---|---|---|---|---|---|---|
| 1 | Al Salmiya Club | 10 | 7 | 2 | 1 | 24 | 10 | +14 | 23 |
| 2 | Al Qadisiya Kuwait | 10 | 6 | 2 | 2 | 16 | 9 | +7 | 20 |
| 3 | Al Kuwait Kaifan | 10 | 4 | 3 | 3 | 16 | 15 | +1 | 15 |
| 4 | Kazma Sporting Club | 10 | 4 | 0 | 6 | 23 | 19 | +4 | 12 |
| 5 | Al Jahra | 10 | 3 | 1 | 6 | 16 | 25 | −9 | 10 |
| 6 | Tadamon | 10 | 2 | 0 | 8 | 12 | 29 | −17 | 6 |

Source: rsssf.com
