= 1989–90 Kuwaiti Premier League =

- Season: 1989–90

Statistics of Kuwaiti Premier League for the 1989–90 season.

== Overview ==
It was contested by 8 teams, and Al Jahra won the championship.

== League standings ==
| Pos | Team | Pld | W | D | L | GF | GA | GD | Pts |
|---|---|---|---|---|---|---|---|---|---|
| 1 | Al Jahra | 21 | 11 | 7 | 3 | 20 | 8 | +12 | 40 |
| 2 | Al Arabi Kuwait | 21 | 10 | 7 | 4 | 27 | 15 | +12 | 37 |
| 3 | Kazma Sporting Club | 21 | 8 | 8 | 5 | 24 | 16 | +8 | 32 |
| 4 | Al Kuwait Kaifan | 21 | 6 | 10 | 5 | 18 | 17 | +1 | 28 |
| 5 | Al Qadisiya Kuwait | 21 | 7 | 6 | 8 | 19 | 19 | 0 | 27 |
| 6 | Al Salmiya Club | 21 | 6 | 9 | 6 | 18 | 18 | 0 | 27 |
| 7 | Al Yarmouk | 21 | 3 | 8 | 10 | 15 | 28 | −13 | 17 |
| 8 | Al Naser Sporting Club | 21 | 2 | 7 | 12 | 13 | 33 | −20 | 13 |

Source: rsssf.com
