= 1964–65 Kuwaiti Premier League =

- Season: 1964–65
- Dates: 9 October 1964 – 1 March 1965
- Champions: Kuwait SC (1st title)
- Matches: 30
- Goals: 144 (4.8 per match)
- Top goalscorer: Abdulrahman Al-Dawla
- Highest scoring: Al-Kuwait 10–2 Al-Shabab (25 December 1964)

1964–65 Kuwaiti Premier League was the 4th season of the First League Division.

== Overview ==
In the fourth season, the school teams, which are Thanwit Al-Shoike (English: Al-Shuwaikh High School), Al-Kalia Al-Saneia (English: The Industrial College) and Al-Shorta (English: The Police), were excluded from participating in the league and witnessed the participation of three new clubs, namely Al-Salmiya, Al-Fahaheel and Al-Shabab. Kuwait SC managed to end Al-Arabi's monopoly on the league championship to achieve its first title in its history after topping the league table without any defeat with eighteen points, scoring 44 goals and conceding 9 goals.

== League table ==
Pos	Team	Pld	W	D	L	GF	GA	GD	Pts
1	Al-Kuwait (C)	10	7	3	0	44	9	+35	17
2	Al-Qadsia	10	6	3	1	35	7	+28	15
3	Al-Arabi	10	6	0	4	32	13	+19	12
4	Al-Salmiya	10	4	1	5	15	30	−15	9
5	Al-Fahaheel	10	2	0	8	8	44	−36	4
6	Al-Shabab	10	1	1	8	10	41	−31	3

Source: Goalzz
(C) Champions
