= 1986–87 Kuwaiti Premier League =

- Season: 1986–87

Statistics of Kuwaiti Premier League for the 1986–87 season.

== Overview ==
It was contested by 8 teams, and Kazma Sporting Club won the championship.

== League standings ==
Pos	Team	Pld	W	D	L	GF	GA	GD	Pts
1	Kazma Sporting Club	14	11	1	2	20	7	+13	34
2	Al Arabi Kuwait	14	9	1	4	20	11	+9	28
3	Al Kuwait Kaifan	14	8	3	3	20	14	+6	27
4	Al Qadisiya Kuwait	14	6	3	5	16	14	+2	21
5	Fahaheel	14	4	4	6	13	19	−6	16
6	Al Yarmouk	14	4	1	9	13	22	−9	13
7	Al Salmiya Club	14	3	3	8	12	17	−5	12
8	Tadamon	14	2	2	10	9	19	−10	8

Source: rsssf.com
