= 1967–68 Kuwaiti Premier League =

- Season: 1967-68
- Champions: Al-Kuwait

1967–68 Kuwaiti Premier League was the 7th season of the First League Division.

== Overview ==
Al-Kuwait won the championship.

== League table ==
Pos	Team	Pld	W	D	L	GF	GA	GD	Pts	Qualification or relegation
1	Al-Kuwait (C)	10	7	2	1	15	8	+7	16	Champions
2	Al-Arabi	10	5	4	1	17	7	+10	14	
3	Al-Salmiya	10	5	2	3	18	11	+7	12	
4	Al-Qadsia	10	5	2	3	16	13	+3	12	
5	Al-Fahaheel	10	1	3	6	7	17	−10	5	
6	Al-Tadamon	10	0	1	9	6	23	−17	1	Relegated

(C) Champions
