= 1970–71 Kuwaiti Premier League =

- Season: 1970-71
- Champions: Al-Qadsia

1970-71 Kuwaiti Premier League was the 10th season of the First League Division.

== Overview ==
Al-Qadsia won the championship.

== League table ==
Pos	Team	Pld	W	D	L	GF	GA	GD	Pts	Qualification or relegation
1	Al-Qadsia (C)	10	8	1	1	24	9	+15	17	Champions
2	Al-Arabi	10	5	4	1	17	6	+11	14	
3	Al-Kuwait	10	5	2	3	17	11	+6	12	
4	Kazma	10	3	2	5	18	18	0	8	
5	Al-Yarmouk	10	1	3	6	13	26	−13	5	
6	Fahaheel	10	1	2	7	7	26	−19	4	

(C) Champions
