= 2003–04 Kuwaiti Premier League =

- Season: 2003–04
- Champions: Qadsiya Kuwait

Statistics of Kuwaiti Premier League for the 2003–04 season.

== Overview ==
It was contested by 14 teams, and Al Qadisiya Kuwait won the championship.

== League standings ==
Pos	Team	Pld	W	D	L	GF	GA	GD	Pts
1	Al Qadisiya Kuwait	13	10	1	2	27	8	+19	31
2	Al Arabi Kuwait	13	9	2	2	24	9	+15	29
3	Al Salmiya Club	13	8	3	2	23	7	+16	27
4	Al Kuwait Kaifan	13	7	4	2	26	9	+17	25
5	Kazma Sporting Club	13	8	1	4	18	15	+3	25
6	Tadamon	13	5	4	4	20	19	+1	19
7	Al-Shabab	13	4	4	5	17	17	0	16
8	Al Jahra	13	4	4	5	15	16	−1	16
9	Khaitan	13	4	1	8	14	20	−6	13
10	Al Yarmouk	13	3	4	6	8	18	−10	13
11	Sahel	13	3	2	8	10	20	−10	11
12	Fahaheel	13	3	2	8	10	26	−16	11
13	Sulaibikhat	13	2	3	8	13	34	−21	9
14	Al Naser Sporting Club	13	1	5	7	14	21	−7	8

Source: rsssf.com

== Places 5–8 ==
=== Semifinals ===
- Tadamon 1–2 : abd Al-Shabab
- Kazma Sporting Club 4–1 : 1–2 Al Jahra

=== 7th Place Match ===
- Al Jahra 0–1 Tadamon

=== 5th Place Match ===
- Al-Shabab 1–2 Kazma Sporting Club

== Places 1–4 ==
=== Semifinals ===
- Al Qadisiya Kuwait 3–0 : 0–1 Al Kuwait Kaifan
- Al Arabi Kuwait 1–2 : 1–0 Al Salmiya Club

=== 3rd Place Match ===
- Al Kuwait Kaifan 1–3 Al Arabi Kuwait

=== Championship final ===
- Al Qadisiya Kuwait 2–1Al Salmiya Club
