= 1974–75 Kuwaiti Premier League =

- Season: 1974–75

Statistics of Kuwaiti Premier League in the 1974–75 season.

== Overview ==
Al Qadisiya Kuwait won the championship.
