= 2004–05 Kuwaiti Premier League =

- Season: 2004–05
- Champions: Qadsiya Kuwait
- Matches: 103
- Goals: 312 (3.03 per match)

14 teams took part in the 2004–05 season of the Kuwaiti Premier League with Al Qadisiya Kuwait winning the championship.

== League standings ==
| Pos | Team | Pld | W | D | L | GF | GA | GD | Pts |
|---|---|---|---|---|---|---|---|---|---|
| 1 | Al Qadisiya Kuwait | 13 | 10 | 1 | 2 | 33 | 10 | +23 | 31 |
| 2 | Al Kuwait Kaifan | 13 | 8 | 3 | 2 | 27 | 12 | +15 | 27 |
| 3 | Al Yarmouk | 13 | 8 | 1 | 4 | 28 | 16 | +12 | 25 |
| 4 | Al Arabi Kuwait | 13 | 7 | 3 | 3 | 23 | 13 | +10 | 24 |
| 5 | Sahel | 13 | 7 | 3 | 3 | 22 | 17 | +5 | 24 |
| 6 | Kazma Sporting Club | 13 | 7 | 2 | 4 | 19 | 9 | +10 | 23 |
| 7 | Al Naser Sporting Club | 13 | 7 | 0 | 6 | 14 | 16 | −2 | 21 |
| 8 | Al Salmiya Club | 13 | 4 | 4 | 5 | 17 | 13 | +4 | 16 |
| 9 | Fahaheel | 13 | 4 | 3 | 6 | 20 | 29 | −9 | 15 |
| 10 | Tadamon | 13 | 4 | 2 | 7 | 21 | 34 | −13 | 14 |
| 11 | Sulaibikhat | 13 | 4 | 1 | 8 | 14 | 22 | −8 | 13 |
| 12 | Al Jahra | 13 | 3 | 4 | 6 | 11 | 21 | −10 | 13 |
| 13 | Khaitan | 13 | 3 | 2 | 8 | 16 | 28 | −12 | 11 |
| 14 | Al-Shabab | 13 | 0 | 1 | 12 | 9 | 34 | −25 | 1 |

Source: rsssf.com

== Championship playoff ==
| Pos | Team | Pld | W | D | L | GF | GA | GD | BP | Pts |
|---|---|---|---|---|---|---|---|---|---|---|
| 1 | Al Qadisiya Kuwait | 3 | 2 | 0 | 1 | 6 | 4 | +2 | 3 | 9 |
| 2 | Al Kuwait Kaifan | 3 | 2 | 0 | 1 | 10 | 4 | +6 | 2 | 8 |
| 3 | Al Arabi Kuwait | 3 | 2 | 0 | 1 | 6 | 3 | +3 | 0 | 6 |
| 4 | Al Yarmouk | 3 | 0 | 0 | 3 | 2 | 13 | −11 | 1 | 1 |

Source: rsssf.com

== Places 5-8 ==
| Pos | Team | Pld | W | D | L | GF | GA | GD | BP | Pts |
|---|---|---|---|---|---|---|---|---|---|---|
| 5 | Al Salmiya Club | 3 | 3 | 0 | 0 | 9 | 1 | +8 | 0 | 9 |
| 6 | Kazma Sporting Club | 3 | 1 | 1 | 1 | 1 | 4 | −3 | 2 | 6 |
| 7 | Al Naser Sporting Club | 3 | 1 | 1 | 1 | 3 | 4 | −1 | 1 | 5 |
| 8 | Sahel | 3 | 0 | 0 | 3 | 1 | 5 | −4 | 3 | 3 |

Source: rsssf.com
