= 1979–80 Kuwaiti Premier League =

- Season: 1979–80
- Teams: 14
- Champions: Al-Arabi
- Matches: 182
- Goals: 555 (3.05 per match)
- Top goalscorer: (Kuwait) Jasem Yaqoub (31 goals)

Statistics of Kuwaiti Premier League in the 1979–80 season.

== Overview ==
Al Arabi Kuwait won the championship.
