= 2002–03 Kuwaiti Premier League =

- Season: 2002–03
- Champions: Qadsiya Kuwait
- Matches: 56
- Goals: 156 (2.79 per match)

Statistics of Kuwaiti Premier League for the 2002–03 season.

== Overview ==
It was contested by 8 teams, and Al Qadisiya Kuwait won the championship.

== League standings ==
Pos	Team	Pld	W	D	L	GF	GA	GD	Pts
1	Al Qadisiya Kuwait	14	9	1	4	22	12	+10	28
2	Al Arabi Kuwait	14	7	5	2	21	12	+9	26
3	Kazma Sporting Club	14	7	3	4	14	7	+7	24
4	Al Kuwait Kaifan	14	6	4	4	25	16	+9	22
5	Al Salmiya Club	14	5	4	5	23	23	0	19
6	Al-Shabab	14	4	4	6	14	18	−4	16
7	Al Naser Sporting Club	14	4	2	8	20	27	−7	14
8	Sahel	14	1	3	10	17	41	−24	6

Source: rsssf.com

== Top scorers ==
Scorer	goals	Team
(Brazil) Dênis Marques	9	Al Kuwait
(Kuwait) Hamad Al Harbi	7	Al-Nasr SC (Kuwait)
(Kuwait) Bashar Abdullah	5	Al Salmiya
(Kuwait) Ahmed Mousa Mirza	5	Al Arabi
(Kuwait) Meshaal Naif	4	Al-Nasr SC (Kuwait)
(Kuwait) Mishari Barrak	4	Al-Sahel SC (Kuwait)
