= 1980–81 Kuwaiti Premier League =

- Season: 1980–81

Statistics of Kuwaiti Premier League in the 1980–81 season.

== Overview ==
Al Salmiya Club won the championship.
