= 1973–74 Kuwaiti Premier League =

- Season: 1973–74

Statistics of Kuwaiti Premier League in the 1973–74 season.

== Overview ==
Al Kuwait Kaifan won the championship.

== League table ==
Pos	Team	Pld	W	D	L	GF	GA	GD	Pts	Qualification or relegation
1	Al-Kuwait (C)	12	7	3	2	21	6	+15	17	Champions
2	Al-Arabi	12	7	2	3	16	9	+7	16	
3	Al-Qadsia	12	4	5	3	29	17	+12	13	
4	Al Salmiya Club	12	4	3	5	18	20	−2	11	
5	Fahaheel	12	4	2	6	13	28	−15	10	
6	Kazma	12	2	5	5	11	18	−7	9	
7	Al-Yarmouk (R)	12	3	2	7	16	26	−10	8	Relegated

(C) Champions; (R) Relegated
