= 1977–78 Kuwaiti Premier League =

- Season: 1977–78

Statistics of Kuwaiti Premier League in the 1977–78 season.

== Overview ==
Al Qadisiya Kuwait won the championship.
