= 2012–13 Kuwaiti Premier League =

Kuwaiti Premier League
- Season: 2012–13
- Champions: Al Kuwait
- Relegated: Kazma Sporting Club
- AFC Cup: Al Kuwait; Qadsia
- Matches: 84
- Goals: 211 (2.51 per match)
- Top goalscorer: Rogério; Issam Jemâa (11 goals)
- Biggest home win: Qadsia SC 7–1 Al Salibikhaet (14 February 2013)
- Biggest away win: Al Salibikhaet 1–5 Al Kuwait (9 November 2012)
- Highest scoring: Qadsia SC 7–1 Al Salibikhaet (14 February 2013)
- Longest winning run: 5 games Al Kuwait
- Longest unbeaten run: 21 games Al Kuwait
- Longest winless run: 9 games Al Jahra
- Longest losing run: 5 games Al Jahra

The 2012–13 Kuwaiti Premier League season is the 51st since the league's establishment. The season starts on 14 September 2012 and ends on the 19 April 2013. Kuwait SC won the league title for the 11th time. Kuwait SC has the longest unbeaten record for 21 games. Rogério and Issam Jemâa won the top goal scorers of the season with 11 goal each.

== Teams ==
Al Shabab were relegated to the Kuwaiti Division One league after finishing bottom in the 2011–12 season. They were replaced by Al Salibikhaet, back in the top flight for the first time since relegation in the 2009–10 campaign.

Locations of teams in the 2012–13 Kuwaiti Premier League

Club	Governorate, City	Stadium	Capacity
Al Arabi	Al Asimah, Al Mansouriah	Sabah Al Salem Stadium	28.000
Al Jahra	Al Jahra	Mubarak Al Ayyar Stadium	17.000
Al Kuwait	Al Asimah, Keifan	Al Kuwait Sports Club Stadium	18.500
Al Naser	Al Farwaniyah, Jleeb Al-Shuyoukh	Ali Al-Salem Al-Sabah Stadium	10.000
Al Salmiya	Hawalli, Salmiya	Thamir Stadium	16.105
Al Salibikhaet	Al Asimah, Sulaibikhat	Al Salibikhaet Stadium	7.000
Kazma Sporting Club	Al Asimah, Adiliya	Al-Sadaqua Walsalam Stadium	21.500
Qadsia	Hawalli, Hawalli	Mohammed Al-Hamad Stadium	22.000

=== Personnel and sponsorship ===
Team	Chairman	Head coach	Captain	Kit manufacturer	Shirt sponsor
Al Arabi SC	(Kuwait) Jamal Al-Kazemi	(Portugal) José Romão	(Kuwait) Hussain Al-Moussawi	TBD	Wataniya Telecom and Al-Ahli Bank of Kuwait
AL-Jahra	(Kuwait) D'Ham AL-Shammari	(Spain) Ginés de Silva	(Angola) André Macanga	TBD	Al Shahed and Al Jeraiwey
Kuwait SC	(Kuwait) Abdulaziz Al Marzouq	(Romania) Ion Marin	(Kuwait) Jarah Al Ateeqi	TBD	Wataniya Telecom and Platinum and BMW
Al Naser SC	(Kuwait) Falah Ghanem	(Portugal) José Rachão	(Kuwait) Suleiman Al Mutairi	TBD	Wataniya
Al-Salmiya SC	(Kuwait) Abdullah Al Tereeji	(Bosnia and Herzegovina) Sanjin Alagic	(Kuwait) Naser Al-Othman	Lotto	Sports Man
Al Salibikhaet SC	(Kuwait) Mohammad Al Hajri	(Serbia) Dragan Gavrilovic	(Kuwait) Nasser Al Hajri	TBD	Sports Man
Kazma SC	(Kuwait) Asaad Al-Banwan	(Montenegro) Miodrag Radulović	(Kuwait) Nawaf Al Humaidan	Adidas	
Qadsia SC	TBD	(Kuwait) Mohammed Ibrahim	(Kuwait) Nawaf Al Mutari	TBD	Samsung AL-Babtian

== League standing ==
Pos	Team	Pld	W	D	L	GF	GA	GD	Pts	Qualification or relegation
1	Al Kuwait	21	16	5	0	54	13	+41	53	2014 AFC Cup
2	Qadsia SC	21	11	8	2	39	16	+23	41	2014 AFC Cup
3	Al-Arabi	21	11	6	4	35	20	+15	39	
4	Al-Nasr	21	6	4	11	20	29	−9	22	
5	Al Jahra	21	5	6	10	15	26	−11	21	
6	Al Salibikhaet	21	5	4	12	18	47	−29	19	
7	Al-Salmiya	21	4	7	10	15	30	−15	19	Relegation playoff
8	Kazma Sporting Club	21	3	6	12	17	32	−15	15	Relegation

Updated to match(es) played on 25 April 2013. Source: fifa.com
Rules for classification: 1) points; 2) goal difference; 3) number of goals scored.

== Promotion/relegation playoff ==
=== 1st leg ===
26 April 2013
16:30 (UTC +3)

Al Shabab	1 - 3	Al Salmiya

=== 2nd leg ===
3 May 2013
16:30 (UTC +3)

Al Salmiya	2 - 1	Al Shabab

Al Salmiyah secured place in the top flight after winning 5–2 on aggregate.

== Results ==
=== Matches 1 - 14 ===
Home \ Away	ARB	JAH	KWT	NAS	SAL	SLM	KAZ	QAD
Al-Arabi		1–1	1–1	3–1	1–1	0–1	4–3	0–0
Al Jahra	0–2		1–3	2–1	3–1	0–0	1–4	1–1
Al Kuwait	2–2	3–0		1–0	4–1	1–0	4–1	1–1
Al-Nasr	0–1	0–0	1–3		3–0	4–2	1–0	0–3
Al Salibikhaet	0–3	1–0	1–5	0–1		3–0	0–0	0–3
Al-Salmiya	1–4	0–0	0–0	0–0	2–0		1–1	0–2
Kazma Sporting Club	0–2	2–0	2–4	2–0	1–1	0–3		0–0
Qadsia SC	2–2	1–0	0–1	1–0	7–1	3–1	0–0	

Updated to match(es) played on unknown. Source:
Legend: Blue = home team win; Yellow = draw; Red = away team win.

=== Matches 15 - 21 ===
Home \ Away	ARB	JAH	KWT	NAS	SAL	SLM	KAZ	QAD
Al-Arabi		0–2			2–0			
Al Jahra				1–0			1–0	2–2
Al Kuwait	3–0	2–0						
Al-Nasr						2–2		2–1
Al Salibikhaet			0–5			1–0		
Al-Salmiya							0–0	
Kazma Sporting Club			0–1	0–1	1–0			
Qadsia SC	2–1					2–1		

Updated to match(es) played on unknown. Source:
Legend: Blue = home team win; Yellow = draw; Red = away team win.

== Top goalscorers ==
Rank	Player	Club	Goals
1	(Tunisia) Issam Jemâa	Kuwait SC	11
	(Brazil) Rogério	Kuwait SC	11
3	(Ba'athist Syria) Omar Al Soma	Qadsia SC	8
	(Brazil) Wilson Antonio	Al Salibikhaet SC	8
5	(Tunisia) Chadi Hammami	Kuwait SC	7
6	(Kuwait) Ali Al Kandari	Kuwait SC	6
