= 1988–89 Kuwaiti Premier League =

- Season: 1988–89

Statistics of Kuwaiti Premier League for the 1988–89 season.

== Overview ==
It was contested by 8 teams, and Al Arabi Kuwait won the championship.

== League standings ==
Pos	Team	Pld	W	D	L	GF	GA	GD	Pts
1	Al Arabi Kuwait	14	12	2	0	17	1	+16	38
2	Kazma Sporting Club	14	7	3	4	13	6	+7	24
3	Al Qadisiya Kuwait	14	6	2	6	19	14	+5	20
4	Al Kuwait Kaifan	14	5	5	4	17	12	+5	20
5	Al Salmiya Club	14	5	4	5	10	10	0	19
6	Al Jahra	14	3	5	6	10	15	−5	14
7	Al Naser Sporting Club	14	3	2	9	9	22	−13	11
8	Fahaheel	14	2	3	9	6	21	−15	9

Source: rsssf.com
