= 1971–72 Kuwaiti Premier League =

- Season: 1971-72
- Champions: Al-Kuwait

1971-72 Kuwaiti Premier League was the 11th season of the First League Division.

== Overview ==
Al-Kuwait won the championship.

== League table ==
Pos	Team	Pld	W	D	L	GF	GA	GD	Pts	Qualification or relegation
1	Al-Qadsia	12	9	2	1	25	6	+19	20	Participants in the Championship play-off
2	Al-Kuwait (C)	12	9	2	1	24	7	+17	20	Participants in the Championship play-off
3	Al-Yarmouk	12	7	0	5	21	13	+8	14	
4	Al-Arabi	12	5	4	3	16	11	+5	14	
5	Kazma	12	3	3	6	24	21	+3	9	
6	Khaitan	12	1	3	8	8	24	−16	5	
7	Fahaheel (R)	12	0	2	10	3	39	−36	2	Relegated

(C) Champions; (R) Relegated

== Championship play-off ==
2 May 1972

Al-Kuwait	1–0	Qadsia
