= 1976–77 Kuwaiti Premier League =

1976-77 season of Kuwait Premier League

- Season: 1976–77

Statistics of Kuwaiti Premier League in the 1976–77 season.

== Overview ==
Al Kuwait Kaifan won the championship.
