= 1978–79 Kuwaiti Premier League =

- Season: 1978–79

Statistics of Kuwaiti Premier League in the 1978–79 season.

== Overview ==
Al Kuwait Kaifan won the championship.
