= 1975–76 Kuwaiti Premier League =

- Season: 1975–76

Statistics of Kuwaiti Premier League in the 1975–76 season.

== Overview ==
Al Qadisiya Kuwait won the championship.
