= 2000–01 Kuwaiti Premier League =

- Season: 2000–01
- Champions: Kuwait Kaifan
- Matches: 56
- Goals: 131 (2.34 per match)

Statistics of Kuwaiti Premier League for the 2000–01 season.

== Overview ==
It was contested by 8 teams, and Al Kuwait Kaifan won the championship.

== League standings ==
Pos	Team	Pld	W	D	L	GF	GA	GD	Pts
1	Al Kuwait Kaifan	14	8	4	2	22	11	+11	28
2	Al Salmiya Club	14	7	3	4	21	15	+6	24
3	Al Arabi Kuwait	14	6	6	2	15	10	+5	24
4	Kazma Sporting Club	14	5	6	3	15	11	+4	21
5	Al Qadisiya Kuwait	14	5	4	5	21	17	+4	19
6	Al Naser Sporting Club	14	5	2	7	11	15	−4	17
7	Tadamon	14	4	4	6	16	20	−4	16
8	Al Jahra	14	0	3	11	10	32	−22	3

Source: rsssf.com
