= Saleh Zakaria =

Kuwaiti football manager

Personal information
- Full name: Saleh Ahmed Mohammed Saleh Al-Khamees
- Date of birth: 1943 (age 82–83)
- Place of birth: Kuwait
- Height: 1.69 m (5 ft 7 in)
- Position: Forward

Youth career
- 1954-1957: Al-Kabali
- 1958: Al-Shamia

Senior career*
Years	Team	Apps	(Gls)
1961–1964	Industrial College		
1964–1968	Al-Kuwait		

International career
1959–1966	Kuwait		

Managerial career
- 1978: Kuwait
- 1978–1982: Kuwait SC
- 1986: Kuwait
- 1986–1987: Qadsia
- 1990: Al-Jahra
- 2003: Kuwait SC
- 2004: Kuwait SC
- 2006–2007: Kuwait
- 2009: Al-Salmiya
- 2010: Al-Salmiya
- * Club domestic league appearances and goals

Saleh Ahmed Mohammed Saleh Al-Khamees famously known by his nickname Saleh Zakaria is a Kuwaiti professional football manager.

== Career ==
In 1978 and 1986 he coached the Kuwait national football team. Since December 2006 until June 2007 he was a head coach of the Kuwait team.
