= 1981–82 Kuwaiti Premier League =

- Season: 1981–82

Statistics of Kuwaiti Premier League in the 1981–82 season.

== Overview ==
Al Arabi Kuwait won the championship.
