= Kuwait Premier League =

Kuwaiti Premier League
- Founded: 1961; 65 years ago
- Country: Kuwait
- Confederation: AFC
- Number of clubs: 12
- Level on pyramid: 1
- Relegation to: Kuwaiti Division One
- Domestic cup(s): Kuwait Emir Cup; Kuwait Crown Prince Cup; Kuwait Super Cup
- International cup(s): AFC Champions League Two; AFC Challenge League; Arab Club Champions Cup
- Current champions: Kuwait (21st title) (2025–26)
- Most championships: Kuwait (21 titles)
- Top scorer: (Kuwait) Bader Al-Mutawa (179 goals)
- Broadcaster(s): Shasha
- Current: 2026–27 Kuwaiti Premier League

The Kuwaiti Premier League (Arabic: الدوري الكويتي, romanized: Dawriyy al-Kuwaytī), known as Zain Premier League due to sponsorship reasons, is the top division of the Kuwait football pyramid system. Formed in 1961, Kuwait holds the best record in the competition, having won 21 times.

== Premier League 2026–27 Clubs ==
- Al-Arabi
- Fahaheel
- Al-Jahra
- Kazma
- Kuwait
- Al-Nasr
- Al-Sahel
- Al-Salmiya
- Al-Shabab
- Sulaibikhat
- Qadsia
- Al-Tadhamon

== History ==
The Kuwaiti Premier League officially began in the 1961–62 season, after playing unofficially for eight years (played with group of clubs: "Ahli - Al-Jazeera - Arabism - Gulf - Solidarity - Al-Qubali, Al-Nahda, Al-Sharqai, Al-Merqab, Al-Mawalim and Al-Taawon). National companies and ministries were club's first sponsors.

=== 1960s ===
In the 1961–62 season, several new clubs joined (Al-Arabi, Qadsia, Kuwait, Kifan High School, Shuwaikh Secondary School, Industrial College and Police Team). Al-Arabi won the league title without losing, and winning 7 points ahead of Qadsia, scoring 42 goals and conceding 10.

In the following season, the number of teams was reduced to 7. Al-Arabi managed to win the second title in a row after winning 18 points ahead of Qadsia, scoring 45 goals and conceding 6.

The third season of the league almost witnessed the end of Al-Arabi monopoly, after fierce competition from Qadsia and other teams. Al-Arabi and Qadsia were equal on points before the decisive match. Al-Arabi managed to maintain the title after defeating Qadsia 2-0, scoring overall 42 goals and conceding nine.

In the fourth season, school teams were removed from participating and league saw participation of 3 new clubs (Al-Salmiya, Fahaheel and Al-Shabab). Kuwait managed to end the Al-Arabi monopoly to achieve its first title, after winning the competition without any defeat.

The 1960s witnessed a sweep of Al-Arabi when it won six titles against two titles for Kuwait and a title for Qadsia.

=== 1970s ===
The 1970 era began with Qadsia winning the 1970–71 season for the second time in its history. Al-Arabi lost its championship in a strange way during ten years. They did not win any title during this period until the end of the 1979–80 season.

=== 1980s ===
The eighties witnessed three new league champions, namely Al-Salmiya who won its first title in the 1980–81 season, and Kazma club which won the titles of 1985–86 and 1986–87, as well as Al-Jahra, which ended the 1980s by winning the title in the 1989–90 season.

=== 1990s ===
The league championship was not held in the 1990–91 season because of Iraqi invasion of Kuwait. Competition began again in the 1991–92 season, which was held as group system with qualification. Old format returned with participation of 14 teams in the 1994–95 season. Era of the nineties witnessed a parity between clubs, with both Al-Arabi and Al-Salmiya winning 3 titles, and Qadsia and Kazma winning two.

=== 2000s ===
At the beginning of a new millennium, Kuwait achieved the league championship after a long absence of 22 years. The most dominant team in this decade were Qadsia winning 5, followed be Kuwait winning 4, and Al-Arabi winning in the 2001–02 season

=== 2010s ===
This decades titles were split between Kuwait and Qadsia. with Kuwait winning 6 and Qadsia winning 4. Qadsia were able to become the 2nd ever team to win 4 titles in a row by winning the 2011–12 season. Kuwait were also able to win 4 titles in a row between 2016–17 and 2019–20.

=== 2020s (until 2025–26) ===
This decade started with Al-Arabi winning the 2020–21 season, followed by Kuwait winning another 5 titles in a row between 2021–22 and 2025–26 making Kuwait the only Kuwaiti Club to win 5 titles in a row.

== Previous winners ==
=== By season ===
- 1961–62 : Al-Arabi
- 1962–63 : Al-Arabi
- 1963–64 : Al-Arabi
- 1964–65 : Kuwait
- 1965–66 : Al-Arabi
- 1966–67 : Al-Arabi
- 1967–68 : Kuwait
- 1968–69 : Qadsia
- 1969–70 : Al-Arabi
- 1970–71 : Qadsia
- 1971–72 : Kuwait
- 1972–73 : Qadsia
- 1973–74 : Kuwait
- 1974–75 : Qadsia
- 1975–76 : Qadsia
- 1976–77 : Kuwait
- 1977–78 : Qadsia
- 1978–79 : Kuwait
- 1979–80 : Al-Arabi
- 1980–81 : Al-Salmiya
- 1981–82 : Al-Arabi
- 1982–83 : Al-Arabi
- 1983–84 : Al-Arabi
- 1984–85 : Al-Arabi
- 1985–86 : Kazma
- 1986–87 : Kazma
- 1987–88 : Al-Arabi
- 1988–89 : Al-Arabi
- 1989–90 : Al-Jahra
- 1990–91 : Not held due to Gulf War
- 1991–92 : Qadsia
- 1992–93 : Al-Arabi
- 1993–94 : Kazma
- 1994–95 : Al-Salmiya
- 1995–96 : Kazma
- 1996–97 : Al-Arabi
- 1997–98 : Al-Salmiya
- 1998–99 : Qadsia
- 1999–2000 : Al-Salmiya
- 2000–01 : Kuwait
- 2001–02 : Al-Arabi
- 2002–03 : Qadsia
- 2003–04 : Qadsia
- 2004–05 : Qadsia
- 2005–06 : Kuwait
- 2006–07 : Kuwait
- 2007–08 : Kuwait
- 2008–09 : Qadsia
- 2009–10 : Qadsia
- 2010–11 : Qadsia
- 2011–12 : Qadsia
- 2012–13 : Kuwait
- 2013–14 : Qadsia
- 2014–15 : Kuwait
- 2015–16 : Qadsia
- 2016–17 : Kuwait
- 2017–18 : Kuwait
- 2018–19 : Kuwait
- 2019–20 : Kuwait
- 2020–21 : Al-Arabi
- 2021–22 : Kuwait
- 2022–23 : Kuwait
- 2023–24 : Kuwait
- 2024–25 : Kuwait
- 2025–26 : Kuwait
- 2026–27 : TBD

=== Most titles ===
Club	Titles	Seasons
Kuwait	21	1964–65, 1967–68, 1971–72, 1973–74, 1976–77, 1978–79, 2000–01, 2005–06, 2006–07, 2007–08, 2012–13, 2014–15, 2016–17, 2017–18, 2018–19, 2019–20, 2021–22, 2022–23, 2023–24, 2024–25, 2025–26
Al-Arabi	17	1961–62, 1962–63, 1963–64, 1965–66, 1966–67, 1969–70, 1979–80, 1981–82, 1982–83, 1983–84, 1984–85, 1979–88, 1988–89, 1992–93, 1996–97, 2001–02, 2020–21
Qadsia	17	1968–69, 1970–71, 1972–73, 1974–75, 1975–76, 1977–78, 1991–92, 1998–99, 2002–03, 2003–04, 2004–05, 2008–09, 2009–10, 2010–11, 2011–12, 2013–14, 2015–16
Kazma	4	1985–86, 1986–87, 1993–94, 1995–96
Al-Salmiya	4	1980–81, 1994–95, 1997–98, 1999–00
Al-Jahra	1	1989–90

=== Total titles won by Governorate ===
Governorate	Number of titles	Clubs
Al Asimah	42	Kuwait (21), Al-Arabi (17), Kazma (4)
Hawalli	21	Qadsia (17), Al-Salmiya (4)
Jahra	1	Al-Jahra (1)

== Topscorers ==
=== All-time top scorers ===
As of 25 June 2025

Rank	Players	Goals	Club(s)
1	(Kuwait) Bader Al-Mutawa	179	Qadsia
2	(Syria) Firas Al-Khatib	162	Al-Nasr, Al-Arabi, Qadsia, Al-Salmiya, Kuwait
3	(Kuwait) Jasem Yaqoub	146	Qadsia
4	(Kuwait) Faisal Al-Dakhil	141	Qadsia
5	(Kuwait) Yussef Al-Suwayed	137	Kazma
6	(Brazil) Patrick Fabiano	133	Al-Nasr, Kazma, Al-Salmiya, Kuwait
7	(Kuwait) Yousef Naser	117	Kazma, Qadsia, Kuwait
8	(Kuwait) Ali Marwi	111	Al-Salmiya
9	(Kuwait) Abdulrahman Al-Dawla	105	Al-Arabi
10	(Kuwait) Bashar Abdullah	104	Al Salmiya, Kuwait

=== Topscorers by season ===
Table key
Record number of goals

Year	Top scorers	Team	Goals
1961–62	(Kuwait) Khalifa Al-Shatti	Qadsia	21
1961–62	(Kuwait) Saleh Zakaria	Al-Kuliya Al-Sanaya	21
1962–63	(Kuwait) Abdulrahman Al-Dawla	Al-Arabi	15
1963–64	(Kuwait) Othman Al-Ossimi	Qadsia	17
1964–65	(Kuwait) Abdulrahman Al-Dawla	Al-Arabi	16
1965–66	(Kuwait) Abdulrahman Al-Dawla	Al-Arabi	22
1966–67	(Kuwait) Abdulrahman Al-Dawla	Al-Arabi	12
1967–68	(Kuwait) Mohamed Yusif	Al-Salmiya	6
1968–69	(Kuwait) Mohamed Al-Misud	Qadsia	6
1968–69	(Kuwait) Ali Hasiz Arti	Al-Arabi	6
1969–70	(Egypt) Hassan Shehata	Kazma	7
1970–71	(Egypt) Hassan Shehata	Kazma	9
1971–72	(Kuwait) Mohamed Al Misud	Qadsia	7
1971–72	(Egypt) Hassan Shehata	Kazma	7
1972–73	(Kuwait) Ali Al-Mali	Al-Arabi	16
1973–74	(Kuwait) Jasem Yaqoub	Qadsia	10
1974–75	(Kuwait) Jasem Yaqoub	Qadsia	25
1975–76	(Kuwait) Jasem Yaqoub	Qadsia	16
1976–77	(Kuwait) Faisal Al-Dakhil	Qadsia	12
1976–77	(Kuwait) Jasem Yaqoub	Qadsia	12
1977–78	(Kuwait) Saud Buhamad	Qadsia	10
1978–79	(Kuwait) Ali Al-Mali	Al-Arabi	10
1979–80	(Kuwait) Jasem Yaqoub	Qadsia	31
1980–81	(Kuwait) Faisal Al-Dakhil	Qadsia	19
1980–81	(Kuwait) Ahmad Khalaf	Al-Arabi	19
1981–82	(Kuwait) Tariq Najm	Kazma	16
1982–83	(Kuwait) Talib Hasin	Sulaibikhat	23
1983–84	(Kuwait) Yussef Al-Suwayed	Kazma	26
1984–85	(Kuwait) Faisal Al-Dakhil	Qadsia	22
1985–86	(Kuwait) Salah Al-Masnad	Kazma	9
1986–87	(Kuwait) Nassir Al-Ghanem	Kazma	9
1987–88	(Kuwait) Faisal Al-Dakhil	Qadsia	11
1988–89	(Kuwait) Bader Al-Anbari	Kazma	8
1989–90	(Kuwait) Khaled Al-Nasr	Al-Arabi	8
1991–92	(Kuwait) Jassem Al Houwaidi	Al-Salmiya	10
1992–93	(Kuwait) Ali Marwi	Al-Salmiya	10
1993–94	(Kuwait) Hamad Al Salah	Qadsia	12
1993–94	(Kuwait) Nawaf Jadid	Al-Jahra	12
1994–95	(Czech Republic) Roman Hanus	Kazma	13
1995–96	(Brazil) Luiz Carlos	Kazma	14
1996–97	(Brazil) Luiz Carlos	Kazma	11
1997–98	(Kuwait) Ali Marwi	Al-Salmiya	28
1998–99	(Kuwait) Ali Marwi	Al-Salmiya	22
1999–2000	(Kuwait) Bashar Abdullah	Al-Salmiya	11
2000–01	(Kuwait) Faraj Laheeb	Kuwait	10
2000–01	(Kuwait) Bashar Abdullah	Al-Salmiya	10
2001–02	(Senegal) Malek John	Kazma	10
2002–03	(Brazil) Dênis Marques	Kuwait	9
2003–04	(Kuwait) Khalaf Al Salamah	Qadsia	12
2004–05	(Syria) Firas Al Khatib	Al-Arabi	13
2005–06	(Kuwait) Hamad Al Harbi	Fahaheel	22
2006–07	(Kuwait) Bashar Abdullah	Kuwait	10
2007–08	(Kuwait) Ahmad Ajab	Qadsia	14
2008–09	(Brazil) Careca	Kuwait	13
2009–10	(Oman) Ismail Al Ajmi	Kuwait	13
2010–11	(Syria) Firas Al Khatib	Qadsia	14
2011–12	(Brazil) Vinícius Lopes	Al-Jahra	9
2012–13	(Brazil) Rogerinho	Kuwait	11
2013–14	(Syria) Omar Al Soma	Qadsia	23
2014–15	(Brazil) Patrick Fabiano	Kazma	22
2015–16	(Syria) Firas Al Khatib	Al-Arabi	23
2016–17	(Brazil) David da Silva	Qadsia	14
2017–18	(Kuwait) Faisal Ajab	Al-Tadhamon	15
2018–19	(Kuwait) Hussain Al-Musawi	Al-Arabi	17
2019–20	(Kuwait) Yousef Nasser	Kuwait	14
2019–20	(Brazil) Patrick Fabiano	Al-Salmiya	14
2020–21	(Palestine) Oday Dabbagh	Al-Arabi	13
2021–22	(Kuwait) Shabaib Al-Khaldi	Kazma	11
2022–23	(Tunisia) Taha Yassine Khenissi	Kuwait	20
2023–24	(Morocco) Hamza Khabba	Al-Arabi	21
2024–25	(Brazil) Vitor Vieira	Fahaheel	22
2025–26	(Kuwait) Yousef Nasser	Kuwait	14

== Participation by the years ==
Period	Number of clubs
1961–62	7
1962–63 to 1970–71	6
1971–72 to 1973–74	7
1974–75 to 1978–79	8
1979–80 to 1984–85	14*
1985–86	7
1986–87 to 1989–90	8
1990–91	N/A Not held due to Gulf War
1991–92	14*
1992–93 to 1993–94	8
1994–95	14*
1995–96	6*

Period	Number of clubs
1996–97	13*
1997–98 to 1999–2000	14
2000–01 to 2002–03	8
2003–04 to 2005–06	14
2006–07	8
2007–08	9
2008–09 to 2012–13	8
2013–14 to 2014–15	14*
2015–16	13*
2016–17	15
2017–18	8
2018–19 to 2025–26	10
2026–27-present	12

Notes:

- 1979–80 to 1984–85: Kuwaiti Division One was Stopped.
- 1991–92: all Clubs participated after the Gulf War
- 1994–95: Kuwaiti Division One was Stopped.
- 1996–97: Qadsia Withdrew.
- 2013–14 to 2014–15: Kuwaiti Division One was Stopped.
- 2015–16: Al-Tadhamon Withdrew.

== See also ==
- Kuwait Division One
- Kuwait Emir Cup
- Kuwait Crown Prince Cup
- Kuwait Super Cup
