= 2006–07 Kuwaiti Premier League =

- Season: 2006–07
- Dates: 2006- 2007
- Teams: 8
- Champions: Al Kuwait Kaifan
- Runner up: Kazma Sporting Club
- Matches: 57
- Goals: 157 (2.75 per match)
- Top goalscorer: (Kuwait) Bashar Abdullah (10 goals)

Statistics of Kuwaiti Premier League for the 2006–07 season.

== Overview ==
It was contested by 8 teams, and Al Kuwait Kaifan won the championship.

== League standings ==
Pos	Team	Pld	W	D	L	GF	GA	GD	Pts
1	Al Kuwait Kaifan	14	10	2	2	24	12	+12	32
2	Kazma Sporting Club	14	10	2	2	23	8	+15	32
3	Al Salmiya Club	14	10	1	3	33	15	+18	31
4	Al Qadisiya Kuwait	14	8	1	5	27	19	+8	25
5	Sahel	14	3	3	8	14	31	−17	12
6	Al Arabi Kuwait	14	1	6	7	11	21	−10	9
7	Tadamon	14	2	3	9	15	28	−13	9
8	Fahaheel	14	2	2	10	8	21	−13	8

Source: rsssf.com

== Championship playoff ==
- Al Kuwait Kaifan 2-0 Kazma Sporting Club
