= 1982–83 Kuwaiti Premier League =

- Season: 1982–83

Statistics of Kuwaiti Premier League in the 1982–83 season.

== Overview ==
Al Arabi Kuwait won the championship.
