= 1987–88 Kuwaiti Premier League =

- Season: 1987–88

Statistics of Kuwaiti Premier League for the 1987–88 season.

== Overview ==
It was contested by 8 teams, and Al Arabi Kuwait won the championship.

== League standings ==
| Pos | Team | Pld | W | D | L | GF | GA | GD | Pts |
|---|---|---|---|---|---|---|---|---|---|
| 1 | Al Arabi Kuwait | 14 | 9 | 4 | 1 | 17 | 5 | +12 | 31 |
| 2 | Al Kuwait Kaifan | 14 | 9 | 3 | 2 | 23 | 13 | +10 | 30 |
| 3 | Al Salmiya Club | 14 | 9 | 1 | 4 | 21 | 14 | +7 | 28 |
| 4 | Kazma Sporting Club | 14 | 8 | 3 | 3 | 22 | 9 | +13 | 27 |
| 5 | Fahaheel | 14 | 4 | 1 | 9 | 16 | 20 | −4 | 13 |
| 6 | Al Naser Sporting Club | 14 | 4 | 1 | 9 | 14 | 26 | −12 | 13 |
| 7 | Al Qadisiya Kuwait | 14 | 3 | 2 | 9 | 22 | 33 | −11 | 11 |
| 8 | Al Yarmouk | 14 | 1 | 3 | 10 | 11 | 26 | −15 | 6 |

Source: rsssf.com
