= 2001–02 Kuwaiti Premier League =

- Season: 2001–02
- Champions: Al-Arabi
- Matches: 56
- Goals: 162 (2.89 per match)

Statistics of Kuwaiti Premier League for the 2001–02 season.

== Overview ==
It was competed between 8 teams, and Al Arabi Kuwait won the championship.

== League standings ==
Pos	Team	Pld	W	D	L	GF	GA	GD	Pts
1	Al Arabi Kuwait	14	8	2	4	21	16	+5	26
2	Al Qadisiya Kuwait	14	7	4	3	21	13	+8	25
3	Al Salmiya Club	14	6	5	3	26	20	+6	23
4	Al Kuwait Kaifan	14	6	2	6	21	15	+6	20
5	Kazma Sporting Club	14	4	6	4	24	23	+1	18
6	Al Naser Sporting Club	14	3	6	5	19	19	0	15
7	Sahel	14	3	5	6	15	25	−10	14
8	Tadamon	14	2	4	8	15	30	−15	10

Source: rsssf.com
