= 2008–09 Kuwaiti Premier League =

- Season: 2008–09
- Dates: October 2008- May 2009
- Teams: 8
- Champions: Al Qadisiya Kuwait (12th title)
- Runner up: Kazma Sporting Club
- Matches: 84
- Goals: 200 (2.38 per match)
- Top goalscorer: 13 Goals (Brazil) Careca Al Naser

The 2008–09 Kuwaiti Premier League season was the 47th since its establishment. The first matches of the season started on Saturday 4 October 2008. The league has also been extended so that clubs will play each other three times this season.

== Members clubs ==
Club	Coach	Nationality	City	Stadium	2007-2008 season	Notes
Kazma Sporting Club	Marinko Koljanin	(Croatia)	Kuwait City	Al-Sadaqua Walsalam Stadium	5th	
Qadsia	Mohammed Ibrahem	(Kuwait)	Kuwait City	Mohammed Al-Hamad Stadium	2nd	2008–09 Arab Champions League Qualifier; Gulf Club Champions Cup 2008 Representative
Kuwait	Dragan	(Serbia)	Kuwait City	Al Kuwait Sports Club Stadium	Champions	AFC Cup 2009 Qualifier; 2008–09 Arab Champions League Qualifier
Salmiya	Mihai Stoichiţă	(Romania)	Al Salmiya	Thamir Stadium	3rd	Gulf Club Champions Cup 2008 Representative
Al Tadamon	Rashid Budaj	(Kuwait)	Farwaniya	Farwaniya Stadium	6th	
Arabi	Ahmed Khalaf	(Kuwait)	Mansuriyah	Sabah Al Salem Stadium	4th	AFC Cup 2009 Qualifier; 2008–09 Arab Champions League Qualifier
Al Shabab	Goran	(Serbia)	Al-Ahmadi	Al-Ahmadi Stadium	Promoted	
Al Naser	Maher Al-Shemari	(Kuwait)	Al Farwaniyah	Ali Al Salem Al Subah	7th	

== Managerial changes ==
Team	Outgoing manager	Reason of departure	Replaced by
Al Kuwait	(Croatia) Marinko Koljanin	Sacked after 9 games	(France) Laurent Banide

== Final standings ==
Pos	Team	Pld	W	D	L	GF	GA	GD	Pts
1	Al Qadsia	21	12	4	5	31	23	+8	40
2	Kazma Sporting Club	21	11	3	7	23	22	+1	36
3	Al Kuwait	21	10	5	6	34	23	+11	35
4	Al Salmiya	21	8	7	6	25	25	0	31
5	Al Arabi	21	8	6	7	24	18	+6	30
6	Al Naser	21	7	5	9	24	28	−4	26
7	Al Tadamon	21	4	7	10	18	29	−11	19
8	Al Shabab	21	2	7	12	21	34	−13	13

== Scorers ==
13 goals

- (Brazil) Careca

10 goals

- (Kuwait) Bader Al Mutawa
- (Syria) Firas Al Khatib

8 goals

- (Kuwait) Faraj Laheeb
- (Brazil) Anthony Topango

7 goals

- (Serbia) Markovic
- (Syria) Jehad Al Hussein

6 goals

- (Kuwait) Fahad Al-Rashidi
- (Kuwait) Khalaf Al-Salamah
- (Kuwait) Khalid Ajab

5 goals

- (Oman) Mohamed Mubarak
- (Kuwait) Yousef Naser
- (Tanzania) Danny Mrwanda
- (Kuwait) Saleh Al Sheikh

4 goals

- (Kuwait) Fahad Al Hamad
- (Brazil) Arago Silva
- (Oman) Ismail Al Ajmi
- (Kuwait) Abdulla Al Buraiky
- (Kuwait) Khaled Khalaf
