= 2010–11 Kuwaiti Premier League =

Kuwaiti Premier League
- Season: 2010–11
- Champions: Qadsia
- Runner up: Kuwait
- Matches: 85
- Goals: 217 (2.55 per match)
- Top goalscorer: (Syria) Firas Al-Khatib (15 goals)

The 2010–11 Kuwaiti Premier League season was the 49th since its establishment. The season started in August and finished in April after a 3-month break for the 2011 AFC Asian Cup played in January.

== Teams ==
Al Salibikhaet and Al Tadamon were relegated to the Kuwaiti Division One league after finishing bottom in the 2009–10 season and relegation playoff respectively.

The two relegated teams were replaced by Kuwaiti Division One champions Al Sahel and playoff winners Al Jahra.

Locations of teams in the 2010–11 Kuwaiti Premier League

Club	Governorate, City	Stadium	Capacity
Al Arabi	Al Asimah, Al Mansouriah	Sabah Al Salem Stadium	28.000
Al Kuwait	Al Asimah, Keifan	Al Kuwait Sports Club Stadium	18.500
Al Naser	Al Farwaniyah, Jleeb Al-Shuyoukh	Ali Al-Salem Al-Sabah Stadium	10.000
Al Sahel	Abu Halifa	Abu Halifa City Stadium	2.000
Al Salmiya	Hawalli, Salmiya	Thamir Stadium	16.105
Al Jahra	Al Jahra	Mubarak Al Ayyar Stadium	17.000
Kazma Sporting Club	Al Asimah, Adiliya	Al-Sadaqua Walsalam Stadium	21.500
Qadsia	Hawalli, Hawalli	Mohammed Al-Hamad Stadium	22.000

== League standing ==
Pos	Team	Pld	W	D	L	GF	GA	GD	Pts	Qualification or relegation
1	Qadsia SC (C)	21	16	3	2	47	10	+37	51	2012 AFC Cup group stage
2	Al Kuwait	21	14	5	2	46	17	+29	47	2012 AFC Cup group stage (Note: Qualified as 2011 AFC Cup Finalists.)
3	Al Arabi	21	12	3	6	28	19	+9	39	
4	Kazma Sporting Club	21	11	5	5	28	14	+14	38	2012 AFC Cup group stage (Note: Qualified as 2011 Kuwait Emir Cup winners.)
5	Al Jahra	21	5	4	12	14	31	−17	19	
6	Al Naser	21	4	4	13	18	34	−16	16	
7	Al-Salmiya	21	3	5	13	17	36	−19	14	Relegation playoff
8	Al Sahel (R)	21	3	3	15	16	53	−37	12	Relegation

Updated to match(es) played on 8 April 2011. Source: fifa.com
Rules for classification: 1) points; 2) goal difference; 3) number of goals scored.
(C) Champions; (R) Relegated

== Promotion/relegation playoff ==
11 April 2011
18:30 (UTC +3)

Al Salmiya	2–1	Khaitan

Al Salmiya retained Premier League status.

== Top goalscorers ==
Rank	Scorer	Club	Goals
1	(Syria) Firas Al Khatib	Qadsia	15
2	(Morocco) Abdelmajid Eddine	Al Arabi	12
3	(Kuwait) Ahmad Alazmy	Al Sahel	10
3	(Kuwait) Ali Al Kandari	Al Kuwait	10
5	(Kuwait) Hussain Al-Moussawi	Al Arabi	9
6	(Kuwait) Khalid Ajab	Al Kuwait	8
6	(Iran) Ali Ferydoon	Al Salmiya	8
8	(Oman) Ismail Al-Ajmi	Al Kuwait	7
8	(Kuwait) Bader Al-Mutwa	Qadsia	7
10	(Kuwait) Fahad Al Enezi	Kazma Sporting Club	6
10	(Kuwait) Waleed Ali	Al Kuwait	6
10	(Kuwait) Jarah Al Ateeqi	Al Kuwait	6
