= 2011–12 Kuwaiti Premier League =

Football league

Kuwaiti Premier League
- Season: 2011–12
- Champions: Qadsia
- AFC Cup: Qadsia; Al Kuwait
- Matches: 86
- Goals: 226 (2.63 per match)

The 2011–12 Kuwaiti Premier League season was the 50th season of the Kuwaiti Premier League. The season started on December 30, 2011 with the regular league season finishing on 1 June 2012. A relegation play-off match was needed to end the campaign on 8 June 2012.

== Teams ==
Al-Sahel were relegated to the Kuwaiti Division One after finishing bottom in the 2010–11 season. They were replaced by Al-Shabab, back in the top flight for the first time since relegation in the 2008–09 campaign.

Locations of teams in the 2011–12 Kuwaiti Premier League

Club	Governorate, City	Stadium	Capacity
Al Arabi	Al Asimah, Al Mansouriah	Sabah Al Salem Stadium	28.000
Al-Jahra	Al Jahra	Mubarak Al Ayyar Stadium	17.000
Kuwait	Al Asimah, Keifan	Al Kuwait Sports Club Stadium	18.500
Al-Nasr	Al Farwaniyah, Jleeb Al-Shuyoukh	Ali Al-Salem Al-Sabah Stadium	10.000
Al-Salmiya	Hawalli, Salmiya	Thamir Stadium	16.105
Al-Shabab	Al Ahmadi	Al-Ahmadi Stadium	18.000
Kazma	Al Asimah, Adiliya	Al-Sadaqua Walsalam Stadium	21.500
Al-Qadsia	Hawalli, Hawalli	Mohammed Al-Hamad Stadium	22.000

== League Standing ==
Pos	Team	Pld	W	D	L	GF	GA	GD	Pts	Qualification or relegation
1	Al-Qadsia	21	16	3	2	39	10	+29	51	2013 AFC Cup Group stage
2	Kuwait	21	11	7	3	29	19	+10	40	2013 AFC Cup Group stage (Note: As 2011–12 Kuwait Emir Cup winners.)
3	Al-Arabi	21	9	6	6	27	20	+7	33	
4	Al-Salmiya	21	7	4	10	26	33	−7	25	
5	Al-Jahra	21	4	12	5	25	30	−5	24	
6	Kazma	21	5	7	9	31	37	−6	22	
7	Al-Nasr	21	4	5	12	22	35	−13	17	Relegation playoff
8	Al-Shabab	21	2	8	11	20	35	−15	14	Relegation

Updated to match(es) played on 1 June 2012. Source: fifa.com
Rules for classification: 1) points; 2) goal difference; 3) number of goals scored.

== Promotion/Relegation Playoff ==
=== 1st Leg ===
5 June 2012
18:30 (UTC +3)

Al-Yarmouk	1 - 1	Al-Nasr

=== 2nd Leg ===
8 June 2012
18:30 (UTC +3)

Al-Nasr	5 - 0	Al-Yarmouk

Al-Nasr secured place in the top flight after winning 6–1 on aggregate.
