= 2009–10 Kuwaiti Premier League =

48th season of the Kuwaiti Premier League

Kuwaiti Premier League
- Season: 2009–10
- Champions: Al Qadsia Kuwait
- Relegated: Al Salibikhaet; Al Tadamon
- Matches: 85
- Goals: 245 (2.88 per match)

The 2009–10 Kuwaiti Premier League season was the 48th since its establishment.

== Members clubs ==
Locations of teams in the 2009–10 Kuwaiti Premier League

Club	Coach	Nationality	Governorate, City	Stadium
Al Arabi	Dragan Skočić	(Croatia)	Al Asimah, Al Mansouriah	Sabah Al Salem Stadium
Al Kuwait	Mohammad Abdullah	(Kuwait)	Al Asimah, Keifan	Al Kuwait Sports Club Stadium
Al Naser	Marcelo Cabo	(Brazil)	Al Farwaniyah, Jleeb Al-Shuyoukh	Ali Al Salem Al Subah
Al Salibikhaet	Abdullah Al-Yarmouk	(Kuwait)	Al Asimah, Sulaibikhat	Al Sulaibikhat Stadium
Al Salmiya	Saleh Zakaria	(Kuwait)	Hawalli, Salmiya	Thamir Stadium
Al Tadamon	Saad Shabib	(Kuwait)	Al Farwaniyah, Farwaniyah	Farwaniya Stadium
Kazma Sporting Club	Milan Máčala	(Czech Republic)	Al Asimah, Adiliya	Al-Sadaqua Walsalam Stadium
Qadsia	Mohammed Ibrahem	(Kuwait)	Hawalli, Hawalli	Mohammed Al-Hamad Stadium

== Transfers ==
Kuwaiti 2009 Summer transfers

== Managerial changes ==
Team	Outgoing manager	Reason of departure	Replaced by
Al Kuwait	(France) Laurent Banide	Contract Expired Pre Season	(Argentina) Nestor Clausen
Al Arabi	(Kuwait) Ahmed Khalaf	Contract Expired June 2009	(Croatia) Dragan Skočić
Al Kuwait	(Argentina) Nestor Clausen	Sacked	(Kuwait) Mohammad Abdullah
Kazma Sporting Club	(Romania) Ilie Balaci	Sacked	(Kuwait) Jamal Yaqoob

== Final league standing ==
Pos	Team	Pld	W	D	L	GF	GA	GD	Pts	Qualification or relegation
1	Qadsia SC (C)	21	15	3	3	49	14	+35	48	2011 AFC Cup (Note: Qadsia SC won the 2010 Kuwait Emir Cup and also reached the 2010 AFC Cup Final. Therefore, the league 2nd and 3rd placed teams also entered the 2011 AFC Cup.)
2	Al Kuwait	21	14	4	3	42	16	+26	46	2011 AFC Cup
3	Al-Nasr	21	12	5	4	29	21	+8	41	2011 AFC Cup
4	Kazma Sporting Club	21	11	4	6	40	26	+14	37	
5	Al-Arabi	21	7	9	5	31	17	+14	30	
6	Al-Salmiya	21	5	5	11	24	44	−20	20	
7	Al Tadamun (R)	21	2	2	17	13	45	−32	8	Relegation playoff
8	Al Salibikhaet (R)	21	2	0	19	15	60	−45	6	Relegation

Updated to match(es) played on 6 May 2010. Source: fifa.com
Rules for classification: 1) points; 2) goal difference; 3) number of goals scored.
(C) Champions; (R) Relegated
Notes:

2009–10 Kuwaiti Premier League
champions
Al Qadsia Kuwait
13th title

== Relegation playoff ==
13 May 2010

Tadamon	1 – 1 6-7 pens	Al Jahra
