= Sulaibikhat =

Sulaibikhat الصليبخات
- District
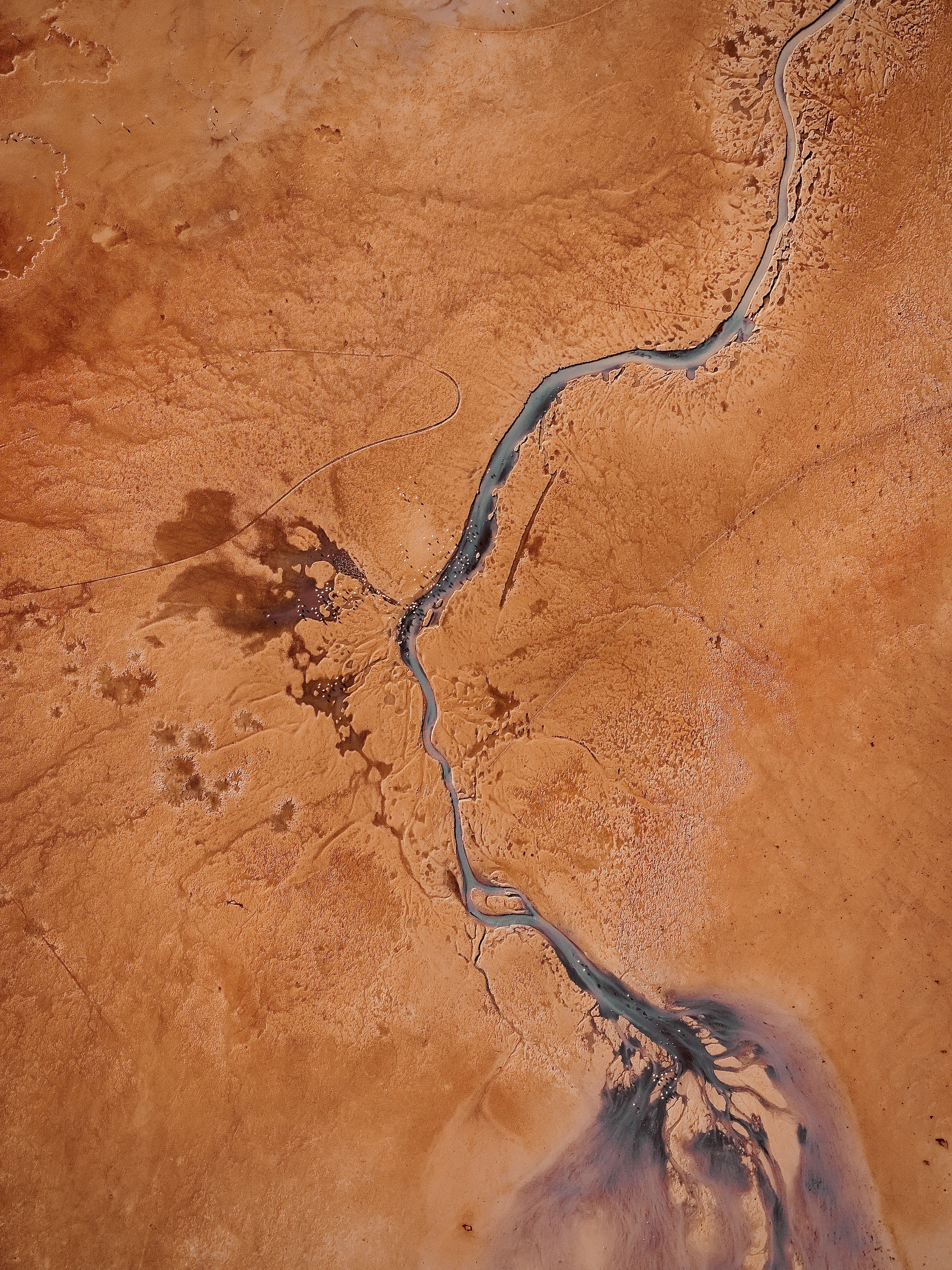

- Location within Kuwait
- Coordinates: 29°18′55″N 47°50′48″E
- Country: Kuwait
- Governorate: Capital Governorate

Area
  - Total: 16.1 km^{2} (6.2 sq mi)
- Elevation: 9 m (30 ft)

Population (2022)
  - Total: 34,361
  - Density: 2,130/km^{2} (5,530/sq mi)

Sulaibikhat (Arabic: الصليبخات, romanized: aṣ-Ṣulaybikhāt) is a district of Kuwait City in Kuwait. It comprises five blocks.

== Sulaibkhat Camp ==
The British camp was built in Sulaibikhat during the British mandate, and consisted of approximately 200 bungalow-style residential units, contained within a fenced area on the Persian Gulf.

After being deserted by the British at the end of the British mandate in 1961, the camp was occupied by senior government employees (doctors, engineers, pharmacists, veterinarians, lawyers, and judges) working for the Government of Kuwait.

The camp had its own police station, its own supermarket (the "Salwa Market"), and at one stage a laundry outlet and a hairstylist.

The camp had a club for the residents in the area with an outdoor swimming pool, three tennis clubs, a football field, and a cinema house. It was the gathering point of the youth on festive occasions. That continued to be the case until 1980, when the residents were relocated and the camp was demolished.

The camp had its own chilled water cooling facility that pumped chilled water to its 200 houses. Fan units in the houses located in each room of the house maintained cool temperatures for the occupants.
