= Saleh Khalifa Al-Dosari =

Saudi Arabian footballer

Personal information
- Full name: Saleh Khalifa Hassan Al-Dosari
- Date of birth: 2 May 1954 (age 72)
- Place of birth: Dammam, Saudi Arabia
- Position: Midfielder

Youth career
- 1968–1973: Al-Ettifaq

Senior career*
Years	Team	Apps	(Gls)
1973–1991	Al-Ettifaq		

International career
1974–1986	Saudi Arabia	69	(9)
- * Club domestic league appearances and goals

Saleh Khalifa Al-Dosari (Arabic: صالح خليفة; born 2 May 1954) is a Saudi Arabian footballer who played for Al-Ettifaq and the Saudi Arabia national team. He competed in the men's tournament at the 1984 Summer Olympics.

He is the younger brother of former Al-Nahda player Ahmed Khalifa and the older brother of Al-Ettifaq teammate Eissa Khalifa.

== Honours ==
=== Club ===
Al-Ettifaq

- Saudi Premier League: 1982–83, 1986–87
- King Cup: 1985
- Saudi Federation Cup: 1990–91
- Arab Club Champions Cup: 1984, 1988
- Gulf Club Champions Cup: 1983, 1988

Saudi Arabia

- AFC Asian Cup: 1984
