= Omar Bakhashwain =

Saudi Arabian footballer

Omar Bakhashwein
Personal information
- Full name: Omar Abdullah Omar Bakhashwein
- Date of birth: August 7, 1962 (age 64)
- Place of birth: Dammam, Saudi Arabia
- Height: 1.71 m (5 ft 7 in)
- Position: Forward

Senior career*
Years	Team	Apps	(Gls)
1982–2002	Al-Ettifaq		

International career
1984–1989	Saudi Arabia	19	(1)

Managerial career
- 2002–2003: Al-Ettifaq (assistant)
- 2003: Al-Ettifaq (caretaker)
- 2003–2004: Al-Ettifaq (assistant)
- 2004: Al-Ettifaq (caretaker)
- 2004–2005: Al-Ettifaq (assistant)
- 2005: Al-Ettifaq (caretaker)
- 2005–2006: Al-Ettifaq (assistant)
- 2006: Al-Ettifaq (caretaker)
- 2006–2007: Saudi Arabia U17 (assistant)
- 2007–2008: Saudi Arabia U23 (assistant)
- 2008–2010: Saudi Arabia U20 (assistant)
- 2010–2012: Saudi Arabia U17
- 2012–2013: Saudi Arabia U15
- 2014: Al-Qadsiah
- 2014–2015: Saudi Arabia U15
- * Club domestic league appearances and goals

Omar Bakhashwain (Arabic: عمر باخشوين; born August 7, 1962) is a Saudi Arabian former football player and manager. He played as a forward.

Bakhashwain began his senior career at Al-Ettifaq in 1982 and spent 20 years at the club, winning 8 major titles with the club. He also represented the national team during his playing career. He participated in the 1984 Gulf Cup and the 1984 Summer Olympics.

After retiring in 2002, Bakhashwain was named assistant manager under Wim Rijsbergen. He was also named Zé Mário's assistant following Rijsbergen's sacking. On 16 March 2003, Bakhashwain was named caretaker until the end of the season following Zé Mário's sacking. Following Jan Versleijen's appointment as Al-Ettifaq's manager, Bakhashwain was once again named as his assistant. He was also named assistant manager to Versleijen's successor, Jorge Habegger. Following Habegger's sacking, Bakhashwain was once again appointed as caretaker on 4 October 2004. On 14 October, 2004, Bakhashwain was once again named assistant manager following Piet Hamberg's appointment. On 30 November 2005, Bakhashwain was named caretaker following Versleijen's sacking. He was then appointed assistant following Ednaldo Patricio's hiring. On 1 November 2006, Bakhashwain was named Al-Ettifaq's manager until the end of the season following Patricio's resignation. On 15 November 2006, Bakhashwain was appointed as Bandar Al-Joathin's assistant in the Saudi Arabia U17 national team. On 30 March 2010, Bakhashwain was appointed manager of the Saudi Arabia U17 national team, a position he held for 2 years. On 14 February 2014, Bakhashwain was appointed as Al-Qadsiah's manager. On 3 March 2014, he resigned from his post. On 26 January 2018, Bakhashwain was named the general manager of the Saudi Arabia national team following Majed Abdullah's resignation.

== Managerial statistics ==
Managerial record by team and tenure
Team	From	To	Record				
Team	From	To	P	W	D	L	Win %
Al-Ettifaq	16 March 2003	29 May 2003	8	4	3	1	50.00
Al-Ettifaq	4 October 2004	14 October 2004	1	0	0	1	0.00
Al-Ettifaq	30 November 2005	4 December 2005	1	1	0	0	100.00
Al-Ettifaq	1 November 2006	15 November 2006	3	2	0	1	66.67
Al-Qadsiah	13 February 2014	3 March 2014	4	1	0	3	25.00
Total			17	8	3	6	47.06

== Honours ==
=== Player ===
Al-Ettifaq

- Saudi Premier League: 1982–83, 1986–87
- King Cup: 1985
- Saudi Federation Cup: 1990–91
- Arab Club Champions Cup: 1984, 1988
- Gulf Club Champions Cup: 1983, 1988

=== Manager ===
Saudi Arabia U17

- GCC U-17 Championship: 2011, 2012
- Arab Cup U-17: 2011
