= Khalil Al-Zayani =

Saudi Arabian football coach (born 1947)

Personal information
- Full name: Khalil Ibrahim Rashid Al-Zayani
- Date of birth: May 21, 1947 (age 79)
- Place of birth: Dammam, Saudi Arabia
- Height: 1.75 m (5 ft 9 in)
- Position: Defender

Senior career*
Years	Team	Apps	(Gls)
1962–1973	Al-Ittifaq		

International career^{‡}
1971	Saudi Arabia		

Managerial career
- 1976–1983: Al-Ittifaq
- 1984–1986: Saudi Arabia
- 1987–1990: Al-Ittifaq
- 1992–1993: Al-Qadisiyah
- 1994–1998: Al-Ittifaq
- 1999: Al-Hilal
Medal record
Men's football
Representing Saudi Arabia (as manager)
AFC Asian Cup
Winner	1984
- * Club domestic league appearances and goals as of January 1, 2011 ‡ National team caps and goals as of January 1, 2011

Khalil Al-Zayani (Arabic: خليل أبراهيم الزياني) is a Saudi Arabian former international footballer and football coach. Al-Zayani is part of Al-Zayani family residing in Dammam city in the Eastern Province of Saudi Arabia.

== Playing career ==
Al-Zayani played for the Al-Ettifaq first team as a defender his whole career from 1962 to 1971. He was captaining the side in 1965 when they won the Crown Prince Cup. He was also part of the team which won the 1968 King Cup. Al-Zayani also represented the Saudi national team. He retired from professional football in 1973.

== Managerial career ==
Zayani's rise as a coach was a natural progression given the success he had as a player. His coaching career started soon after he retired as a player, as an assistant coach for the Al-Ittifaq first team. That particular tenure lasted two years but he later had several stints with the club a manager, he was promoted to head coach for the first time in 1976.

Al-Zayani won the 1982–83 Saudi Premier League, thus Al-Ettifaq became the first team from Dammam to win the title and first team to win the league title undefeated, and Khalil Al-Zayani also became the first Saudi Arabian manager to win the league title. The 1983 Gulf Club competition was also won in the same season making Al-Ettifaq the first Saudi team to win a non-domestic title.

In between his Ettifaq managerial stints, he was successful as the Saudi Arabia national team coach, a mission he first started in March 1984. Al-Zayani was called up by the national federation and asked to travel to Muscat, Oman to replace the sacked Mário Zagallo, coach of the Brazil World Cup-winning team of 1970 that featured Pelé. Zagalo was let go after a 4–0 defeat to Iraq as the Saudis collected only one win from their first three matches in the 7th Arabian Gulf Cup. Al-Zayani became the first Saudi head coach to manage the Saudi Arabia national football team. Zayani, nonetheless, proved to be up to the task as he oversaw a draw against Kuwait and was victories over the United Arab Emirates and Bahrain as Saudi Arabia finished third in the competition.

In August 1984, he oversaw the Saudi national football team in the Olympic Games finals in Los Angeles, which was considered a significant achievement at the time, but his sights were firmly fixed on the AFC Asian Cup scheduled for December that year.

Zayani called up several younger players, including players such as Mohaisen Al-Jam'an, Majed Abdullah and Mohamed Abd Al-Jawad. He took Saudi Arabia to new heights in the continent as he led the country as debutants in the 1984 AFC Asian Cup in Singapore. Saudi Arabia won Group A ahead of Kuwait, Qatar, Syria and Korea Republic. In the semi-finals they followed up with a 5-4 penalty shootout victory over Iran after a 1–1 draw in extra time to qualify to the final. In the final, Al-Zayani led the Saudi Arabia national football team to 2-0 victory over China with goals from Shaye Al-Nafisah and Majed Abdullah to claim their first Asian Cup and first senior national team title.

Al-Zayani came back to coach Al-Ettifaq in 1987 for the second time, winning the 1986–87 Saudi Premier League in his first season, and the 1988 Arab Club Champions Cup together with the 1988 Gulf Club Champions Cup in his second season.

Al-Zayani went on to coach Al-Qadisiya and Al-Hilal, as well as a third stint with Al-Ettifaq.

== Asian Cup success ==
Al-Zayani's decision to go with youth paid off with the Saudis defeating China 2–0 in the final for their first-ever AFC Asian Cup title.

Al-Zayani said about the tournament:

“That was our first ever title, and everyone was happy to get such a magnificent continental success.. “The psychological side of football is very important and this should work hand-in-hand with the tactical side. “The Asian Cup in Singapore had always special meaning, not only for me but for all the people involved in Saudi football at the time. “It was the start of a great era for us and we became one of the strongest sides in Asia in the following years.”

== Current activities ==
In 2002, after a long career as a coach, Zayani decided to move from the bench to behind-the-desk role, as vice-president of Al-Ittifaq for a certain time. He is also an occasional television pundit.

== Honours ==
=== Player ===
Al-Ettifaq

- Crown Prince Cup:
  - Champion (1): 1965
- King's Cup:
  - Champion (1): 1968

=== Manager ===
Al-Ettifaq

- Saudi Premier League:
  - Champion (2): 1982–83, 1986–87
- GCC Champions League:
  - Champions (2): 1983, 1988
- Arab Club Champions Cup:
  - Champions (1): 1988

Saudi Arabia

- AFC Asian Cup:
  - Champions (1): 1984
