= Oman Handball League =

- Current season, competition or edition: 2025–26 Omani League
- Sport: Handball
- First season: 1987; 39 years ago
- Administrator: OHA
- No. of teams: 8 teams
- Country: Oman
- Confederation: AHF
- Continent: Asia
- Most recent champion: Oman Club (11th titles) (2025–26)
- Most titles: Ahli Sidab Club (12 titles)
- Level on pyramid: Level 1
- Relegation to: National 2
- Domestic cups: Omani Cup; Omani Super Cup
- International cups: AHF Asian Club Championship; Arab Clubs Championship

The Omani Handball League ( Arabic : الدوري العماني لكرة اليد للرجال ) is the highest level of men's Handball in Oman and it is organized by the Oman Handball Association. The Omani Handball League is currently contested by 8 clubs around the country as of the last season 2025–26.

The regular season is played by 8 teams, playing each other twice, once at home and once away from home. After that in the final regular season ranking the best 4 teams will advance to the Semi playing each other best of 3 games, while the Final will have two games, home and away to define the champions.

== Titles by Seasons ==
Season	Champions	Runners-up	Third place
1987–88	Al-Seeb Club	Oman Club	Al-Ahli Club
1988–89	Oman Club	Al-Seeb Club	Al-Ahli Club
1989–90	Oman Club	Al-Ahli Club	Al-Seeb Club
1990–91	Al-Bustan Club (now Muscat Club)	Oman Club	Al-Seeb Club
1991–92	Oman Club	Al-Bustan Club (now Muscat Club)	Al-Seeb Club
1992–93	Al-Orouba SC	Al-Bustan Club (now Muscat Club)	Al-Ahli Club
1993–94	Oman Club	Al-Bustan Club (now Muscat Club)	Al-Orouba SC
1994–95	Al-Bustan Club (now Muscat Club)	Al-Orouba SC	Oman Club
1995–96	Oman Club	Sidab Club	Al-Ahli Club
1996–97	Sidab Club	Al-Nasr SC	Oman Club
1997–98	Sidab Club	Oman Club	Al-Bustan Club (now Muscat Club)
1998–99	Sidab Club	Oman Club	Al-Bustan Club (now Muscat Club)
1999–2000	Sidab Club	Al-Seeb Club	Al-Ahli Club
2000–01	Sidab Club	Al-Bustan Club	Al-Ahli Club
2001–02	Sidab Club	Al-Seeb Club	Al-Ahli Club
2002–03	Sidab Club	Al-Seeb Club	Al-Bustan Club (now Muscat Club)
2003–04	Ahli Sidab Club	Al-Seeb Club	Muscat Club
2004–05	Ahli Sidab Club	Muscat Club	Oman Club
2005–06	Muscat Club	Al-Seeb Club	Ahli Sidab Club
2006–07	Al-Seeb Club	Muscat Club	Ahli Sidab Club
2007–08	Al-Seeb Club	Muscat Club	Ahli Sidab Club
2008–09	Muscat Club	Ahli Sidab Club	Al-Seeb Club
2009–10	Muscat Club	Ahli Sidab Club	Al-Seeb Club
2010–11	Ahli Sidab Club	Muscat Club	Al-Seeb Club
2011–12	Muscat Club	Ahli Sidab Club	Al-Seeb Club
2012–13	Muscat Club	Ahli Sidab Club	Al-Seeb Club
2013–14	Ahli Sidab Club	Muscat Club	Al-Seeb Club
2014–15	Muscat Club	Ahli Sidab Club	Al-Seeb Club
2015–16	Ahli Sidab Club	Muscat Club	Oman Club
2016–17	Muscat Club	Oman Club	Ahli Sidab Club
2017–18	Muscat Club	Oman Club	Ahli Sidab Club
2018–19	Oman Club	Muscat Club	Sohar SC
2019–20	Cancelled due Covid-19		
2020–21	?	?	?
2021–22	Oman Club	?	?
2022–23	Oman Club	?	?
2023–24	Oman Club	?	?
2024–25	Oman Club	?	?
2025–26	Oman Club	Muscat Club	?

Sources :

== Titles by Clubs ==
Rk	Club	Titles	Years Won
1	Ahli Sidab Club	12	1996–97, 1997–98, 1998–99, 1999–2000, 2000–01, 2001–02, 2002–03, 2003–04, 2004–05, 2010–11, 2013–14, 2015–16
2	Oman Club	11	1988–89, 1989–90, 1991–92, 1993–94, 1995–96, 2018–19, 2021–22, 2022–23, 2023–24, 2024–25, 2025–26
3	Muscat Club (Note: Includes two titles won as Al-Bustan Club.)	10	1990–91 (Note: Won as Al-Bustan Club.), 1994–95 (Note: Won as Al-Bustan Club.), 2005–06, 2008–09, 2009–10, 2011–12, 2012–13, 2014–15, 2016–17, 2017–18
4	Al-Seeb Club	3	1987–88, 2006–07, 2007–08
5	Al-Orouba SC	1	1992–93
