= Al-Ettifaq Club =

Association football club in Dammam, Saudi Arabia

Al-Ettifaq
- Full name: Al-Ettifaq Club
- Nicknames: Faris Ad-Dahna (The Knight of Ad-Dahna); The Commandos
- Founded: 1945; 81 years ago
- Ground: Al-Ettifaq Club Stadium; Dammam, Saudi Arabia
- Capacity: 12,924
- Owner: Ministry of Sports
- Chairman: Samer Al-Misehal
- Head coach: Arthur Papas
- League: Saudi Pro League
- 2025–26: Pro League, 7th of 18
- Website: ettifaq.com
Home colours	Away colours

Al-Ettifaq Club (Arabic: نادي الاتفاق) is a professional football club in Dammam, Saudi Arabia, which competes in the Saudi Pro League.

The club was established by the merger of three Dammam-based clubs in 1945. Al-Ettifaq were the first Saudi team to win an international title – the 1984 Arab Club Champions Cup. They were also the first to win the Saudi Premier League without any defeats, and the first Saudi team to win the GCC Champions League. Al-Ettifaq have a total of 13 titles to their name. The club also has its own futsal section.

== History ==
=== Humble beginning (1941–1953) ===
Before the establishment of Al-Ettifaq as a professional sports club that also managed football, there were three clubs in the city of Dammam that were founded in 1941. Al-Taawoun (different from Al-Taawoun from Buraydah city), Al-Sha'ab and Al-Shabab. These clubs practiced their own sporting activities and gathered people across the region; however, these clubs gained little revenue for the sport activity to continue.

4 years later, in 1945, the presidents of the club and its staff met in Faris Al-Hamid's house, the ministry of sport at the time. There, they discussed a solution for their problems, and resulted in the merge all three clubs in Dammam into one single unified club. The ministry would fund the newly merged club and get its share of ownership. Al-Hamid also suggested to name the new club as "Al-Ettifaq" (الاتفاق al-ittifāq), which meant "the agreement" in Arabic.

The club's original color would also change, becoming green and white, which eventually changed into green and red afterwards. Some time later Mohammed Hassan Khairi from Sudan became the new club manager. In the early years of the club, the energetic and ambitious coach from Africa started to reform the sport club from Dammam.

=== First King Cup and Crown Prince Cup (1954–1971) ===
Al-Ettifaq saw some success in the domestic championship of the 1960s. A key reason for this achievement was the decision to sign the most prolific Ettifaqi player, Khalil Al-Zayani, in 1962. Zayani graduated from youth team Academy, as a wingback/centerback (defender) at just 15 years old. At the time, a nationwide football league was not yet established and regional leagues and tournaments were only held occasionally. Nevertheless, the manager's decision to entrust the defense role to Zayani proved successful, as the club was able to reach the final of the 1963 Crown Prince Cup.

Al-Ettifaq faced their final opponent in the national tournament, Al-Ittihad in their home ground (Jeddah). Loud cheers echoes from the opposing supporters after Al-Ettifaq defeated 6–2. The club run for 1963 King Cup is less successful from their Crown Prince Run. 1963-1964 Saudi Season end with Al-Ittihad securing their double title again after defeating their rival Al-Hilal.

The Khalil Al-Zayani was tested once again in 1964-1965 Saudi football season, when the barely 16 years old defender was selected by Khairi as the squad’s captain. Khairi encouraged the squad to aim high for the new record, he wanted for his coached player to raise occasional Regional League cup, King Cup and Crown Prince Cup at the same time or as we know as "treble".

The 17 years old Defender captain walked his first step to become nation football champion, when he secured his club back at the final match Crown Prince Cup against Al-Ittihad at the same pitch, avenging their defeat almost 3 years earlier. However Ettifaq failed to win the King Cup on that season in which Al-Ahli from the same city as Al-Ittihad went victorious.

In 1964-1965 Saudi Season even though Ettifaq won a national trophy, they fall short to achieve their treble goal. Meanwhile, for the young Zayani, around this time he is scouted to be part of Saudi National Team. Some of Ettifaq player also constitute part of the Eastern Team who compete under Crown Prince Cup new regulation and they managed to reach final in 1966-1967 Saudi Season.

On 1966 King Cup, in the final Al Ettifaq defeated by Al-Wehda and in 1967 King Cup, tasted defeat again by Al-Ittihad. For the third times in a row reaching final, Al-Ettifaq finally raise their first ever King Cup after defeating the defending champion in previous tournament. On the next seasons however, Al-Ettifaq defeated by new challenger and Al-Ahli become the winner of King Cup in that season. Hassan Khairi retired from the club activity after coaching Ettifaqi player for over 1 decade.

Al-Zayani keep playing as the club player until 1971 and retired from Saudi National Team in 1973, completely retiring from football the age of just 26 years old. In his career he managed to reach 5 finals in different competition and win 2 trophies for his club. Khalil Al-Zayani played his entire club career for Al-Ettifaq.

=== Champion from Dammam (1972–1989) ===
==== Sharp decline in 1970s ====
After Khairi and Zayani departure, Al-Ettifaq never the reach the final of national tournament. Slowly the condition inside the club become worrisome, Saudi Ministry of Sport then offer the 29 years old retired ex-player, to coach the club and also prepare the club for implementation of planned national league. Al-Ettifaq would be main representation from the city of Dammam.

Zayani agree to step up and took managerial role. At this time nationwide league are newly established with 8 clubs registered. Al-Ettifaq only eligible to play in second-tier of the Saudi League, First Division League and only able to make into 2nd place just behind Al-Nahda. The winner and runner-up at that time are promoted into Saudi Premier League.

Al-Ettifaq are promoted in the second edition of the league in 1977-1978 Saudi Premier League. In their first run in highest tier of league national, Al-Ettifaq finish 3rd place behind Al-Nassr in 2nd place and Al-Hilal as league champion. In the 1978–1979, Al Ettifaq finish in 6th position, 1979-1980 they finish again the same position and in 1981-1982 Ettifaqi finish in 5th position. In this period the club never won any single competition for over a decade except for getting promotion into Saudi Premier League.

Regardless of the setbacks, Zayani still confident to continue his predecessor ambition to secure the treble for club. The former defender began to implemented new tactics and shaping new core player, once the majority squad from 1970s started to retiring. His new winning strategy are applied by promising academy players promoted from the youth teams.

==== Saudi Premier league and Gulf Club Cup Championship ====
The club new youth players catch the attention of the nation when 1982–83 Saudi Premier League began on 16 December 1982. Some of the most recognized forwards such as Jamal Mohammad and Omar Bakhashwain made their debut in this season. Al-Ettifaq are undefeated in their run by the end of season in April 1983. First Saudi football club to ever do so. The club had nine wins and eight draws with a match left to conclude the season. Going into the final matchday, Al-Hilal were leading the table with 1 point ahead of Al-Ettifaq.

The two teams would face their city rivals in the final matchday on separate days. On 7 April 1983, Al-Ettifaq defeated Al-Nahda 2–0. This meant that Al-Hilal needed just a draw against Al-Nassr to secure the title, as they were ahead of Al-Ettifaq on goal difference as well. On 8 April 1983, Al-Nassr defeated Al-Hilal 2–1 to hand Al-Ettifaq their first league title. Al-Ettifaq also became the first team from Dammam to win the title. Khalil Al-Zayani also became the first Saudi Arabian manager to win the league title and Jamal Muhammad managed to reach 3rd position in top scorer table behind Khalid Al-Ma'ajil in 2nd place and Majeed Abdullah as the league golden boot winner.

After winning the league, city of Dammam that are located in Saudi East Coastline are invited in the 2nd edition Gulf Club competition by Arabian Gulf countries. Al-Ettifaq are among the 12 team that listed in the competition. The last decisive match will be played by the club that reach the 1st position in tha chart table which is Al-Ettifaq and Al-Arabi from Kuwait. Ettifaqi defeat their opponent in foreign soil of Khalifa International Stadium, Doha, Qatar, gaining the honour for the first Saudi team to win non-domestic title and their first regional title.

==== Temporary replacement of Zayani ====
Kuwait victory against all odds in 1980 Asian Cup bring the wind of change in the national team. Saudi targeted the next Asian Cup and 1984 Summer Olympics in Los Angeles, subsequently Al-Zayani who coach Al-Ettifaq are the most suitable candidate to managed the country strategy. Zayani temporarily left the club in March 1984, immediately replacing Mario Zagallo one of Pele teammates in the ongoing 7th Arabian Gulf Cup tournament after the former Brazilian forward defeated by Iraq 4–0.

In Zayani absence Chico Formiga was brought in from Santos FC as a replacement and preparing the squad for 1984 Arab Club Champions Cup, it is held in 1984 because in the previous year the championship are postponed for technical reason. Al-Ettifaq are pitted by 3 other team in one group stage which are: Kenitra AC from Morocco winner of Botola Pro, West Riffa from Bahrain winner of Bahraini Premier League and Al-Ansar FC from Lebanon. Al-Etiffaq barely beat Kenitra by just 1 point difference after defeating Al-Ansar in their homebase and prevail to achieve their first treble, by securing 1 domestic title and 2 regional title.

In the next season, Chico plan to achieve his first domestic title. On the start of 1985 King Cup, Al-Hilal are the defending champion, Al-Ettifaq face Al-Shabab at the round of 16 with the result of 1–0. In the next round they defeated Abha FC 2–0, the club went draw against Al-Ahli 1–1 in which Ettifaq defeat Ahli at the penalty shootout 4–5. Al-Ettifaq face the defending champion in their homebase at Riyadh. Abo Haidar are the first to score while Al-Nayfawy equalize, until the extra time end the score is still 1-1. Bakhashwain and Al-Dughaim scored the decisive penalty goal and went victorious with 4–3, Al-Ettifaq won their second king cup title.

==== Double regional title ====
Chico managed the club in 1986-1987 Saudi Premier League until halfway of season. The former prolific center back of Palmeiras are replaced by Al-Zayani to coach Al-Ettifaq for the second time. Winning the 1986–87 Saudi Premier League once again in his first season back, and the 1988 Arab Club Champions Cup together with the 1988 Gulf Club Champions Cup in his second season.

==== 1989 AFC Champions League ====
Al-Ettifaq qualified for the 1989 AFC Champions League after winning 1988 Gulf Club Champions Cup. In their first campaign Al-Ettifaq reached the semi-final . On 11 October 1988 Al-Ettifaq managed to defend their first position after equalizing their score and against April 25 from North Korea 1-1. In the next match of 13 October 1988 however, they are eliminated after they fall in 2nd position after defeated by Al-Sadd SC from Qatar 2–1, the eventual champion of that year.

== Honours ==
- Saudi Premier League: (tier 1)
  - Champions: 1982–83, 1986–87
  - Runners-up: 1987–88, 1991–92
- Saudi First Division League: (tier 2):
  - Champions: 2015–16
  - Runners-up: 1976–77
- King's Cup:
  - Champions: 1968, 1985
  - Runners-up: 1965, 1966, 1983, 1988
- Crown Prince's Cup:
  - Champions: 1965
  - Runners-up: 1963, 2000–01, 2007–08, 2011–12
- Saudi Federation Cup:
  - Champions: 1990–91, 2002–03, 2003–04
  - Runners-up: 1986–87, 1994–95, 1995–96, 2004–05
- General League Shield
  - Runners-up: 1968–69
- Arab Club Champions Cup:
  - Champions: 1984, 1988
- GCC Champions League:
  - Champions: 1983, 1988, 2006
  - Runners-up: 2007

== Players ==
As of 15 August 2026

Note: Flags indicate national team as defined under FIFA eligibility rules; some limited exceptions apply. Players may hold more than one non-FIFA nationality.

No.	Pos.	Nation	Player
1	GK	SVK	Marek Rodák
3	DF	KSA	Abdullah Madu
4	DF	SCO	Jack Hendry
5	DF	BRA	Pedro Henrique
7	MF	KSA	Khalid Al-Ghannam
9	FW	FRA	Moussa Dembélé
10	MF	ESP	Álvaro Medrán
11	MF	SVK	Ondrej Duda
13	DF	KSA	Mishal Al-Alaeli
14	DF	KSA	Turki Al-Madani
15	DF	KSA	Abdullah Al-Bishi
17	FW	SWE	Jordan Larsson
20	MF	KSA	Abdulhakim Maghfori
22	GK	KSA	Abdulbasit Hawsawi
23	GK	KSA	Ahmed Al-Rehaili
24	FW	KSA	Jalal Al-Salem
26	MF	KSA	Riyadh Sharahili (on loan from Neom)
27	MF	KSA	Hassan Al-Musallam

No.	Pos.	Nation	Player
29	MF	KSA	Ziyad Al-Ghamdi
33	DF	KSA	Madallah Al-Olayan
42	MF	CIV	Abdoulaye Kanté
43	MF	KOS	Bersant Celina
58	MF	KSA	Yasser Al-Shammari
60	MF	KSA	Abdulrahman Nabza
61	DF	KSA	Radhi Al-Otaibi
70	DF	KSA	Abdullah Al-Khateeb
71	FW	SRB	Matija Gluščević
77	MF	KSA	Abdulelah Hawsawi (on loan from Al-Ittihad)
78	DF	KSA	Marzouq Tambakti
80	FW	FRA	Rayane Messi (on loan from Strasbourg)
87	DF	KSA	Meshal Al-Sebyani
88	FW	KSA	Ali Al-Eisa
90	FW	KSA	Talal Haji (on loan from Al-Ittihad)
92	GK	KSA	Turki Ba Al-Jawsh
99	FW	SDN	Sultan Harun (on loan from Al-Qadsiah)

=== Out on loan ===
Note: Flags indicate national team as defined under FIFA eligibility rules; some limited exceptions apply. Players may hold more than one non-FIFA nationality.

No. / Pos. / Nation / Player; 18 / MF / POR / João Costa (at Cruzeiro)	No. / Pos. / Nation / Player; — / MF / RSA / Mohau Nkota (at Orlando Pirates)

== Coaching staff ==
Position	Name
Head coach	(Australia) (Greece) Arthur Papas
Assistant coach	(Australia) Eli Babalj (Wales) Darren Davies (Portugal) Emanuel Ribeiro (Saudi Arabia) Mishal Al-Mulla
Head of football and Development Insights	(Australia) Jack Lee
Head of performance	(England) Cody Williamson
Goalkeeping coach	(Italy) (Australia) Davide Del Giovine
Assistant goalkeeper coach	(Saudi Arabia) Faisal Sowayed Alkhald
Fitness coach	(Tunisia) Sabri Hadhri
Asssitant fitness coach	(Saudi Arabia) Youssef El-Idrissi
Individual coach	(Saudi Arabia) Khalid Abdulrahman
Performance analyst	(Algeria) Billel Arab-Chaaba (Saudi Arabia) Ahmed Abass
Head of analysis	(Greece) Geroge Apostolidis
Doctor	(Portugal) Basil Ribeiro
Head of Strength & Conditioning	(Republic of Ireland) Barry Solan
Sporting Director	(Saudi Arabia) Sultan Al-Dosari
Head of Scouting	(England) Thomas Spring
Director Of Youth Football	(Saudi Arabia) Ahmed Al-Shahrani

== Managerial history ==
Note: The table is currently being updated.

1945–69		
19??–69	(Sudan) Mohammed Hassan Kheiri	
1974–76	(England) Ted Copeland	
1976–78	(Saudi Arabia) Khalil Al-Zayani	
1979–80		
1980–84	(Saudi Arabia) Khalil Al-Zayani	Won the 1982–83 Saudi Premier League and the 1983 Gulf Club Champions Cup
1984–86	(Brazil) Chico Formiga	Won the 1984 Arab Club Champions Cup and the 1985 King Cup
1986–90	(Saudi Arabia) Khalil Al-Zayani	Won 3 titles
1990–91	(Brazil) Procópio Cardoso	
1991–93		
July 1, 1993 – June 30, 1995	(Poland) Wojciech Łazarek	
1994–96	(Saudi Arabia) Khalil Al-Zayani	
1996–97		
1997	(Brazil) João Francisco	
1997–99		
1999–00	(Saudi Arabia) Khalil Al-Zayani	
2003	(Brazil) Zé Mário	
2003–04	(Netherlands) Jan Versleijen	
Jan 1, 2004 – May 30, 2004	(Argentina) Jorge Habegger	
2005–06	(Brazil) Ednaldo Patricio	
2006–07	(Tunisia) Ammar Al-Suwayeh	2006 Gulf Club Champions Cup (winner)
July 1, 2007 – June 30, 2008	(Portugal) Toni	2007 Gulf Club Champions Cup (runner-up)
Jan 8, 2009 – June 8, 2009	(Romania) Ioan Andone	Achieved club's best performance in the AFC Champions League (round of 16)
Oct 23, 2009 – March 23, 2011	(Romania) Ion Marin	
March 23, 2011 – June 30, 2011	(Tunisia) Youssef Zouaoui	
July 22, 2011 – April 30, 2012	(Croatia) Branko Ivanković	
2012	(Tunisia) Ammar Al-Suwayeh	
July 1, 2012 – Sept 25, 2012	(Switzerland) Alain Geiger	
Sept 26, 2012 – June 13, 2013	(Poland) Maciej Skorża	
July 1, 2013 – Oct 1, 2013	(Germany) Theo Bücker	
Sept 30, 2013 – Oct 26, 2013	(Romania) Eusebiu Tudor	
Oct 26, 2013 – Feb 13, 2014	(Serbia) Goran Tufegdžić	
Feb 13, 2014–July, 2014	(Romania) Ioan Andone	
July 2014 – Feb 17, 2015	(Spain) Beñat San José	
(2015)	(Romania) Gheorghe Mulțescu	
(2015–16)	(Germany) Reinhard Stumpf	
(2016)	(Tunisia) Djamel Belkacem	2015–16 Saudi First Division
(2016)	(Netherlands) Eelco Schattorie	
(2016–2017)	(Spain) Juan Carlos Garrido	
(2017)	(Serbia) Miodrag Ješić	
(2017–2018)	(Saudi Arabia) Saad Al-Shehri	
(2018)	(Uruguay) Leonardo Ramos	
(2018–2019)	(Spain) Sergio Piernas	
(2019)	(Portugal) Hélder	
(2019–2021)	(Saudi Arabia) Khaled Al-Atwi	
(2021–2022)	(Serbia) Vladan Milojevic	
(2022–2023)	(France) Patrice Carteron	
(2023)	(Spain) Antonio Cazorla	
(2023–2025)	(England) Steven Gerrard	
(2025–2026)	(Saudi Arabia) Saad Al-Shehri	

== Performance in AFC competitions ==
- Asian Club Championship: 1 appearance
  - Asian Club Championship 1989:
    - Qualifying Round: Al Ettifaq qualified to the Asian Club Championship after winning the GCC Champions League, ending top of the group that consisted of Kazma (Kuwait), Al Sharjah (UAE), Fanja (Oman), and West Riffa (Bahrain).
    - Semi-final (group stage): Al Ettifaq finished second in their group after losing their penultimate game against the eventual champions, Qatari side Al-Sadd (2–1) in a highly controversial game. Apart from the two clubs, the group contained April 25 SC (North Korea), Mohammedan SC (Bangladesh), and Pahang (Malaysia).
- AFC Champions League: 2 appearances
  - AFC Champions League 2009:
    - Group Stage – Round of 32: Al Ettifaq was arguably one of the best performers in the group stage after finishing top of the group with 12 points. They won 4 games, lost 2, and scored 15 goals in 6 games, recording the third best attacking stats in the continent in that round. Al Ettifaq were placed in Group D along FC Bunyodkor (led by Brazilian ace Rivaldo), Sepahan Isfahan, and Al Shabab (UAE).
    - Round of 16: Al Ettifaq were knocked from the Round of 16 against Pakhtakor (UZB). After leading 1–0 at halftime, they conceded two late goals that ended their hopes in qualifying to the quarter-final.
  - AFC Champions League 2012:
    - The draw was held on 6 December 2011 in the Malaysian capital Kuala Lumpur.
    - Al Ettifaq were placed in the second round of the qualifying stages, playing against the winner of the two Iranian sides: Esteghlal Tehran FC and Zob Ahan Isfahan FC.
    - Al-Ettifaq lost the one-off game played on 18 February 2012 in Iran against Esteghlal Tehran FC and eventually went directly to the group stages of the 2012 AFC Cup.
- AFC Cup: 1 appearance
  - AFC Cup 2012:
    - After failing to qualify to the group stage of the 2012 AFC Champions League, Al-Ettifaq qualified automatically to the 2012 AFC Cup, and were drawn in Group C with Kuwait SC of Kuwait, Al Ahed of Lebanon, and VB Sports Club of the Maldives.
    - Al Ettifaq started the competition as favorites and a strong candidate to win the competition, winning 5–1 in their first group game against Kuwait SC in Kuwait. The second game was frustrating to the Saudis as they drew in their own stadium 0–0 with Al Ahed. They defeated the underdogs of the group VB Sports Club by 6–3 in the Maldives and 2–0 in the reverse fixture. Al Ettifaq sealed their promotion with a 2–2 draw against Kuwait SC before finishing the group with a 3–1 victory in Lebanon against Al Ahed.
    - Al Ettifaq finished off their season with a hard-fought 1–0 victory against Omani side Al-Suwaiq SC in the Round of 16 to progress to the quarter-finals of the tournament.

== International competitions ==
=== Overview ===
As of 1 May 2013

Competition	Pld	W	D	L	GF	GA
Asian Club Championship / AFC Champions League	18	8	2	8	32	23
AFC Cup	11	7	2	2	24	13
Arab Club Champions Cup	23	11	8	4	41	25
GCC Champions League	33	17	9	7	45	30
TOTAL	85	43	21	21	142	91

=== Record by country ===
Country	Pld	W	D	L	GF	GA	GD	Win%
Algeria	1	0	0	1	1	2	−1	0.00
Bahrain	7	4	2	1	10	3	+7	57.14
Bangladesh	1	1	0	0	3	1	+2	100.00
Egypt	2	1	0	1	3	3	+0	50.00
Indonesia	2	2	0	0	4	0	+4	100.00
Iran	3	1	0	2	3	7	−4	33.33
Iraq	1	0	1	0	2	2	+0	0.00
Jordan	1	0	1	0	4	4	+0	0.00
Kuwait	14	6	4	4	24	19	+5	42.86
Lebanon	4	2	2	0	5	2	+3	50.00
Malaysia	1	1	0	0	4	1	+3	100.00
Maldives	2	2	0	0	8	3	+5	100.00
Morocco	4	3	0	1	4	2	+2	75.00
North Korea	1	0	1	0	1	1	+0	0.00
Oman	8	7	1	0	15	6	+9	87.50
Qatar	10	3	3	4	10	11	−1	30.00
Palestine	1	1	0	0	5	1	+4	100.00
Saudi Arabia	2	1	1	0	2	1	+1	50.00
Tunisia	2	0	2	0	2	2	+0	0.00
United Arab Emirates	11	5	2	4	19	13	+6	45.45
Uzbekistan	5	2	0	3	8	5	+3	40.00
Yemen	2	1	1	0	5	2	+3	50.00

=== Matches ===
Season	Competition	Round	Club	Home	Away	Aggregate
1983	Gulf Club Champions Cup	Group stage	(Bahrain) Al-Muharraq	0–0	2−0	1st
1983	Gulf Club Champions Cup	Group stage	(Qatar) Al-Arabi	2–0	0−2	1st
1983	Gulf Club Champions Cup	Final	(Kuwait) Al-Arabi	1–0		1–0
1984	Arab Club Champions Cup	Final Stage	(Bahrain) West Riffa	1–1		1st
1984	Arab Club Champions Cup	Final Stage	(Morocco) Kénitra	1–0		1st
1984	Arab Club Champions Cup	Final Stage	(Lebanon) Al Ansar	1–0		1st
1988	Gulf Club Champions Cup	Group stage	(Oman) Fanja	1–0		1st
1988	Gulf Club Champions Cup	Group stage	(United Arab Emirates) Sharjah	1–0		1st
1988	Gulf Club Champions Cup	Group stage	(Bahrain) West Riffa	3–1		1st
1988	Gulf Club Champions Cup	Group stage	(Kuwait) Kazma	1–1		1st
1988	Gulf Club Champions Cup	Final	(Kuwait) Kazma	2–1		2–1
1988	Arab Club Champions Cup	Group B	(United Arab Emirates) Sharjah	2–2		1st
1988	Arab Club Champions Cup	Group B	(Iraq) Al-Shabab Baghdad	2–2		1st
1988	Arab Club Champions Cup	Group B	(Kuwait) Kazma	3–1		1st
1988	Arab Club Champions Cup	Group B	(Morocco) KAC Marrakech	1–0		1st
1988	Arab Club Champions Cup	Semi-finals	(Oman) Fanja	3–1		3–1
1988	Arab Club Champions Cup	Final	(Tunisia) Club Africain	1–1		1–1 (4–2 p)
1988–89	Asian Club Championship	Semi-final League Group B	(Malaysia) Pahang	4–1		2nd
1988–89	Asian Club Championship	Semi-final League Group B	(Bangladesh) Mohammedan Sporting Club	3–1		2nd
1988–89	Asian Club Championship	Semi-final League Group B	(North Korea) April 25	1–1		2nd
1988–89	Asian Club Championship	Semi-final League Group B	(Qatar) Al-Sadd	1–2		2nd
1989	Arab Club Champions Cup	Group B	(Morocco) Wydad	0–2		3rd
1989	Arab Club Champions Cup	Group B	(Tunisia) ES Sahel	1–1		3rd
1989	Arab Club Champions Cup	Group B	(Oman) Fanja	2–0		3rd
1989	Arab Club Champions Cup	Group B	(Lebanon) Al Ansar	1–1		3rd
1993	Arab Club Champions Cup	Group B	(Kuwait) Al-Qadsia	0–1		3rd
1993	Arab Club Champions Cup	Group B	(Algeria) WA Tlemcen	1–2		3rd
1993	Arab Club Champions Cup	Group B	(Palestine) Hilal Al-Quds	5–1		3rd
2003	Arab Unified Club Championship	PO	(Yemen) Shaab Ibb	3–0	2−2	5–2
2003	Arab Unified Club Championship	Group A	(Jordan) Al-Faisaly	4–4		1st
2003	Arab Unified Club Championship	Group A	(Bahrain) Riffa	2–0		1st
2003	Arab Unified Club Championship	Group A	(Morocco) Raja	2–0		1st
2003	Arab Unified Club Championship	Group A	(Egypt) ENPPI	2–0		1st
2003	Arab Unified Club Championship	Semi-finals	(Egypt) Zamalek	1–3		1–3
2005	Gulf Club Champions Cup	Group stage	(Oman) Muscat	2–2		6th
2005	Gulf Club Champions Cup	Group stage	(Kuwait) Al-Qadsia	1–2		6th
2005	Gulf Club Champions Cup	Group stage	(Bahrain) Riffa	0–1		6th
2005	Gulf Club Champions Cup	Group stage	(Qatar) Umm Salal	0–0		6th
2005	Gulf Club Champions Cup	Group stage	(United Arab Emirates) Al-Wasl	1–2		6th
2006	Gulf Club Champions Cup	Group B	Qatar	2–0		2nd
2006	Gulf Club Champions Cup	Group B	(United Arab Emirates) Al Jazira	0–1		2nd
2006	Gulf Club Champions Cup	Group B	(Oman) Al-Nasr	2–1		2nd
2006	Gulf Club Champions Cup	Semi-finals	(Kuwait) Al-Salmiya	3–0	3−3	6–3
2006	Gulf Club Champions Cup	Final	(Kuwait) Al-Qadsia	1–1	1−0	2–1
2007	Gulf Club Champions Cup	Group A	(Bahrain) Al-Najma	2–0		2nd
2007	Gulf Club Champions Cup	Group A	(Qatar) Al-Wakrah	2–1		2nd
2007	Gulf Club Champions Cup	Group A	(United Arab Emirates) Al Jazira	1–1		2nd
2007	Gulf Club Champions Cup	Semi-finals	(Saudi Arabia) Al-Hilal	1–1	1−0	2–1
2007	Gulf Club Champions Cup	Final	(United Arab Emirates) Al Jazira	2–0	1−3	3–3 (6–7 p)
2009	AFC Champions League	Group D	(Uzbekistan) Bunyodkor	4–0	1−2	1st
2009	AFC Champions League	Group D	(Iran) Sepahan	2–1	0−3	1st
2009	AFC Champions League	Group D	(United Arab Emirates) Al-Shabab Al-Arabi	4–1	4−1	1st
2009	AFC Champions League	Round of 16	(Uzbekistan) Pakhtakor	1–2	–	1–2
2009–10	Gulf Club Champions Cup	Group C	Qatar	1–1	2−3	2nd
2009–10	Gulf Club Champions Cup	Group C	(Oman) Al-Orouba	3–2	1−0	2nd
2012	AFC Champions League	2Q	(Iran) Sepahan	–	1–3	1–3
2012	AFC Cup	Group C	Al-Kuwait	2–2	5−1	1st
2012	AFC Cup	Group C	(Lebanon) Al-Ahed	0–0	3−1	1st
2012	AFC Cup	Group C	(Maldives) VB	2–0	6−3	1st
2012	AFC Cup	Round of 16	(Oman) Al-Suwaiq	1–0	–	1–0
2012	AFC Cup	Quarter-finals	(Indonesia) Arema	2–0	2–0	4–0
2012	AFC Cup	Semi-finals	Al-Kuwait	0–2	1–4	1–6
2013	AFC Champions League	Group B	(Uzbekistan) Pakhtakor	2–0	0−1	3rd
2013	AFC Champions League	Group B	(Qatar) Lekhwiya	0–0	0−2	3rd
2013	AFC Champions League	Group B	(United Arab Emirates) Al-Shabab Al-Arabi	4–1	0−1	3rd

== See also ==
- List of football clubs in Saudi Arabia

Preceded by Al-Arabi (Kuwait)	GCC Champions League; Runner-up: Al-Arabi; 1983	Succeeded by Al-Ahli (Saudi Arabia)
Preceded by Kazma (Kuwait)	GCC Champions League; Runner-up: Kazma; 1988	Succeeded by Fanja SC (Oman)
Preceded by Qadsia SC (Kuwait)	GCC Champions League; Runner-up: Qadsia SC; 2006	Succeeded by Al Jazira (United Arab Emirates)
