= 22nd GCC Champions League =

2006 GCC Champions League
Tournament details
- Dates: 25 August 2006 – 20 February 2007
- Teams: 12 (from AFC/UAFA confederations)

Final positions
- Champions: (Saudi Arabia) Al-Ettifaq (3rd title)
- Runners-up: (Kuwait) Al-Qadsia

Tournament statistics
- Top scorer: (Saudi Arabia) Saleh Bashir (5 goals)

The 22nd GCC Champions League (Arabic: دوري أبطال مجلس التعاون الخليجي) was the 22nd edition of the GCC Champions League for clubs of the Gulf Cooperation Council nations, and the first under its new name.

The 2006 edition was won by Saudi side Al-Ettifaq for the third time.

== The groups ==
Group A	Group B	Group C
(Kuwait) Al-Qadsia (United Arab Emirates) Sharjah (Bahrain) Al-Muharraq; Al Arabi (Qatar)	(United Arab Emirates) Al-Jazira Club (Saudi Arabia) Al-Ettifaq (Oman) Al-Nasr; Qatar SC	(Oman) Muscat; Bahrain Riffa Club (Saudi Arabia) Al-Hilal (Kuwait) Al Salmiya Club

== Results ==
=== Group A ===
(in Manama, Bahrain)

Team	Pld	W	D	L	GF	GA	GD	Pts
(Kuwait) Al-Qadsia	3	2	1	0	7	5	+2	7
(United Arab Emirates) Sharjah	3	2	0	1	6	5	+1	6
(Bahrain) Al-Muharraq	3	1	1	1	4	4	0	4
Al Arabi (Qatar)	3	0	0	3	4	7	–3	0

=== Group B ===
(in Salala, Oman)

Team	Pld	W	D	L	GF	GA	GD	Pts
(United Arab Emirates) Al-Jazira Club	3	2	1	0	2	0	+2	7
(Saudi Arabia) Al-Ettifaq	3	2	0	1	4	2	+2	6
Qatar SC	3	0	2	1	0	2	–2	2
(Oman) Al-Nasr	3	0	1	2	1	3	–2	1

=== Group C ===
(in Riyadh, Saudi Arabia)

Team	Pld	W	D	L	GF	GA	GD	Pts
(Kuwait) Al Salmiya Club	3	3	0	0	8	2	+6	9
Bahrain Riffa Club	3	1	1	1	3	3	0	4
(Saudi Arabia) Al-Hilal	3	0	2	1	2	3	–1	2
(Oman) Muscat	3	0	1	2	2	7	–5	1

== Semi-finals ==
=== 1st legs ===
October 30, 2006

Al Salmiya Club (Kuwait)	3–3	(Saudi Arabia) Al-Ettifaq

October 30, 2006

Al-Jazira Club (United Arab Emirates)	2–2	(Kuwait) Al-Qadsia

=== 2nd legs ===
November 19, 2006

Al-Qadsia (Kuwait)	1–0	(United Arab Emirates) Al-Jazira Club

November 19, 2006

Al-Ettifaq (Saudi Arabia)	3–0	(Kuwait) Al Salmiya Club

== Final ==
December 25, 2006

Al-Qadsia (Kuwait)	0–1	(Saudi Arabia) Al-Ettifaq

February 20, 2007

Al-Ettifaq (Saudi Arabia)	1–1	(Kuwait) Al-Qadsia

== Winner ==
GCC Champions League
2006 Winners

Al-Ettifaq
3rd Title
