= 1985 King Cup =

Tournament details
- Country: Saudi Arabia
- Dates: 4 – 28 February 1985
- Teams: 16

Final positions
- Champions: Al-Ettifaq (2nd title)
- Runners-up: Al-Hilal

Tournament statistics
- Matches played: 15
- Goals scored: 30 (2 per match)
- Top goal scorer(s): Jamal Mohammed; Hussam Abu Dawood (3 goals)

The 1985 King Cup was the 27th season of the knockout competition since its establishment in 1956. Al-Hilal were the defending champions but they were eliminated by eventual champions Al-Ettifaq in the final. This was the first edition of the competition to have 16 teams participate instead of 32.

Al-Ettifaq won their 2nd title after defeating Al-Hilal 1–0 in the final.

== Bracket ==
Round of 16
H	Ohod	1
A	Al-Ittihad	3
H	Radhwah	0
A	Al-Ahli	2
H	Al-Wadie	1
A	Al-Wehda	0
H	Al-Ettifaq	1
A	Al-Shabab	0
H	Al-Qadsiah	3
A	Al-Riyadh	0
A	Al-Nassr	1
H	Al-Nahda (aet)	3
H	Al-Kawkab	2
A	Al-Jabalain	1
A	Al-Hilal	1
H	Al-Taawoun	0

Quarter-finals
H	Al-Ittihad	0
A	Al-Ahli	1
A	Al-Wadie	0
H	Al-Ettifaq	2
H	Al-Qadsiah	0 (1)
A	Al-Nahda (pen.)	0 (3)
A	Al-Kawkab	0
H	Al-Hilal	2

Semi-finals
H	Al-Ahli	1 (4)
A	Al-Ettifaq (pen.)	1 (5)
H	Al-Nahda	1 (1)
A	Al-Hilal (pen.)	1 (2)

Final
–	Al-Ettifaq (pen.)	1 (4)
–	Al-Hilal	1 (3)

Note: H: Home team, A: Away team

Source: Al Jazirah

== Round of 16 ==
The matches of the Round of 16 were played on 4 and 5 February 1985.

Home team	Score	Away team
Al-Ettifaq	1–0	Al-Shabab
Al-Wadie	1–0	Al-Wehda
Al-Taawoun	0–1	Al-Hilal
Al-Kawkab	2–1	Al-Jabalain
Radhwah	0–2	Al-Ahli
Al-Nahda	3–1 (aet)	Al-Nassr
Ohod	1–3	Al-Ittihad
Al-Qadsiah	3–0	Al-Riyadh

== Quarter-finals ==
The Quarter-final matches were held on 11 and 12 February 1985.

Home team	Score	Away team
Al-Ittihad	0–1	Al-Ahli
Al-Ettifaq	2–0	Al-Wadie
Al-Qadsiah	0–0 (1–3 pen.)	Al-Nahda
Al-Hilal	2–0	Al-Kawkab

== Semi-finals ==
The four winners of the quarter-finals progressed to the semi-finals. The semi-finals were played on 18 February 1985. All times are local, AST (UTC+3).

18 February 1985
16:00

Al-Ahli	1–1 (a.e.t.)	Al-Ettifaq
Samdo 119'	Report	Mohammed 117'
Penalties
Abd Al-Jawad (penalty scored); Dabo (penalty scored); Anbar (penalty scored); Sobhi (penalty scored); Amer (penalty missed)	4–5	(penalty scored) Mohammed; (penalty scored) Jassim; (penalty scored) Bakhashwain; (penalty scored) Al-Saleh; (penalty scored) Abu Dali

Youth Welfare Stadium in Jeddah, Jeddah
Referee: Ibrahim Al-Dahmash
18 February 1985
20:00

Al-Nahda	1–1	Al-Hilal
Al-Mansour	Report	Bashir
Penalties
Al-Fuhaid (penalty missed); Al-Shamsi (penalty missed); Al-Muhazai (penalty scored); Saad (penalty missed); Al-Mansour (penalty missed)	1–2	(penalty scored) Al-Rahma; (penalty missed) Al-Musaibeah; (penalty missed) Al-Hathlool; (penalty missed) Al-Mohanna; (penalty scored) Nu'eimeh

Youth Welfare Stadium in Dammam, Dammam
Referee: Fahad Al-Mohawis

== Final ==
The final was played between Al-Hilal and Al-Ettifaq in the Youth Welfare Stadium in Al-Malaz, Riyadh. Al-Hilal were appearing in their 10th final while Al-Ettifaq were making their 5th appearance in the final.

28 February 1985
16:30 (UTC+3)

Al-Ettifaq	1–1 (a.e.t.)	Al-Hilal
Abo Haidar 22'	Report	Al-Nayfawy 57'
Penalties
Mohammed (penalty scored); Jassim (penalty scored); Bakhashwain (penalty scored); Al-Saleh (penalty missed); Abu Dali (penalty missed); Al-Dughaim (penalty scored)	4–3	(penalty scored) Al-Qahtani; (penalty missed) Al-Rahma; (penalty missed) Bashir; (penalty scored) Mohanna; (penalty scored) Nu'eimeh; (penalty missed) Al-Hathlool

Youth Welfare Stadium in Al-Malaz, Riyadh
Attendance: 31,000
Referee: Fahad Al-Mohawis

== Top goalscorers ==
Rank	Player	Club	Goals
1	(Saudi Arabia) Hussam Abu Dawood	Al-Ahli	3
1	(Saudi Arabia) Jamal Mohammed	Al-Ettifaq	3
