= 2003 Arab Unified Club Championship preliminary stage =

The 2003 Arab Unified Club Championship preliminary stage decided the teams which played into two zones, Africa and Asia.

- Qualified as holders: Al-Ahli (Saudi Arabia) (did not enter)
- Qualified as hosts: Zamalek (Egypt), ENPPI (Egypt)

== Zone 1: (Gulf Area) ==
- Representatives: Riffa (Bahrain), Kuwait SC (Kuwait), (United Arab Emirates) ? (UAE), ? (Oman), ? (Qatar)
- Qatar, UAE and Oman representatives withdrew
- Two teams qualified: Kuwait SC, (Bahrain) Riffa

== Zone 2: (Red Sea) ==
- Representatives: Al-Ettifaq (Saudi Arabia), Sha'ab (Ibb) (Yemen)
- No representatives from Egypt, Djibouti, Somalia, Sudan and Comoros Islands

Team 1	Agg.	Team 2	1st leg	2nd leg
Al-Ettifaq (Saudi Arabia)	5–2	(Yemen) Sha'ab (Ibb)	3–0	2–2^{1}

^{1} The two matches have been played in Saudi Arabia in 23 and 25 May 2003.

- One teams qualified: (Saudi Arabia) Al-Ettifaq

== Zone 3: (North Africa) ==
- Representatives: Club Africain (Tunisia), Raja Casablanca (Morocco), USM Alger (Algeria)
- No representative from Libya and Mauritania
- No decision was taken for the date of this group, presumably Club Africain withdrew
- Two teams qualified: (Algeria) USM Alger, (Morocco) Raja Casablanca

== Zone 4: (East Region) ==
- Representatives: Nejmeh (Lebanon), Al-Aqsa (Palestine), Al-Faisaly (Jordan), Al-Jaish (Syria)
- Al-Shorta (Iraq) admitted without playing qualification
- The matches have been played in Jordan, from 21–25 May 2003

Team	Pld	W	D	L	GF	GA	GD	Pts
(Jordan) Al-Faisaly	3	3	0	0	7	0	+7	9
(Syria) Al-Jaish	3	2	0	1	4	3	1	6
(Palestine) Al-Aqsa	3	0	1	2	4	8	-4	1
(Lebanon) Nejmeh	3	0	1	2	3	7	-4	1

21 May 2003

Al-Jaish (Syria)	2 – 0	(Lebanon) Nejmeh

21 May 2003

Al-Faisaly (Jordan)	3 – 0	(Palestine) Al-Aqsa

23 May 2003

Al-Aqsa (Palestine)	3 – 3	(Lebanon) Nejmeh

23 May 2003

Al-Faisaly (Jordan)	2 – 0	(Syria) Al-Jaish

25 May 2003

Al-Jaish (Syria)	2 – 1	(Palestine) Al-Aqsa

25 May 2003

Al-Faisaly (Jordan)	2 – 0	(Lebanon) Nejmeh

- Two teams qualified: (Jordan) Al-Faisaly, (Syria) Al-Jaish
