= 1st GCC Club Championship =

1982 GCC Club Championship
Tournament details
- Dates: 10 December 1982 – 21 February 1983
- Teams: 12 (from AFC/UAFA confederations)

Final positions
- Champions: (Kuwait) Al-Arabi (1st title)
- Runners-up: (Bahrain) Al-Riffa

The 1st GCC Club Championship (Arabic: بطولة الأنديـة الخليجية أبطال الدوري) was the first edition of the GCC Club Championship for clubs of the Gulf Cooperation Council nations. This edition of the competition featured five nations from Bahrain, Kuwait, Oman, Qatar and Saudi Arabia. Al-Wasl of the United Arab Emirates withdrew without playing any matches, as many players were selected for the Asian youth championship.

The competition was played between December 1982 and February 1983 on a home and away league format. Al-Arabi of Kuwait were crowned the inaugural champions.

== Standings ==
Pos	Team	Pld	W	D	L	GF	GA	GD	Pts
1	(Kuwait) Al-Arabi	8	5	1	2	13	5	+8	11
2	(Bahrain) West Rifaa	8	3	3	2	11	7	+4	9
3	(Qatar) Al-Rayyan	8	4	1	3	10	10	0	9
4	(Saudi Arabia) Al-Nassr	8	3	2	3	6	6	0	8
5	(Oman) Al-Ahli	8	1	1	6	6	18	−12	3
6	(United Arab Emirates) Al Wasl	0	0	0	0	0	0	0	0

Source: RSSSF
Rules for classification: 1) points; 2) goal difference; 3) goals scored; 4) head-to-head result; 5) fair play ranking.

== Matches ==
10 December 1982

Al-Riffa (Bahrain)	2–0	(Kuwait) Al-Arabi
