= 21st GCC Club Championship =

2005 GCC Club Championship
Tournament details
- Host country: Kuwait
- Dates: 16–27 September 2005
- Teams: 6 (from AFC/UAFA confederations)

Final positions
- Champions: (Kuwait) Al-Qadsia (2nd title)
- Runners-up: (United Arab Emirates) Al-Wasl

The 21st GCC Club Championship (Arabic: بطولة الأنديـة الخليجية أبطال الدوري) was the 21st edition of the GCC Club Championship for clubs of the Gulf Cooperation Council nations.

The 2005 edition was won by Kuwaiti side Al Qadsia Kuwait for the second time.

== Results ==
Team	Pts	Pld	W	D	L	GF	GA	GD
Al Qadsia Kuwait	10	5	3	1	1	6	4	+2
(United Arab Emirates) Al Wasl	9	5	3	0	2	8	5	+3
(Oman) Muscat	9	5	2	3	0	4	2	+2
Bahrain Riffa Club	7	5	2	1	2	5	5	0
(Qatar) Umm-Salal	4	5	1	1	3	6	9	−3
(Saudi Arabia) Al-Ettifaq	2	5	0	2	3	3	7	−4

All matches were played in Kuwait.

Sept 16, 2005	Al Qadisia	3–1	Umm Salal
Sept 17, 2005	Al-Etifaq	2–2	Muscat
Sept 17, 2005	Riffa	3–0	Al Wasl
Sept 19, 2005	Umm Salal	1–4	Al Wasl
Sept 19, 2005	Al Qadisia	2–1	Al-Ettifaq
Sept 20, 2005	Muscat	0–0	Riffa
Sept 21, 2005	Al Qadisia	0–2	Al Wasl
Sept 22, 2005	Riffa	1–0	Al-Ettifaq
Sept 22, 2005	Muscat	1–0	Al Wasl
Sept 25, 2005	Umm Salal	0–0	Al-Ettifaq
Sept 25, 2005	Muscat	1–0	Al Wasl
Sept 26, 2005	Al Qadisia	1–0	Riffa
Sept 26, 2005	Al-Ettifaq	0–2	Al Wasl
Sept 27, 2005	Riffa	1–4	Umm Salal
Sept 27, 2005	Al Qadisia	0–0	Muscat

Source: RSSSF

== Top Scorer ==
- (Brazil) Alexandre Oliveira (Al Wasl FC) – 4 goals

== Winner ==
GCC Club Championship
2005 Winners

Al Qadsia Kuwait
2nd Title
