= 23rd GCC Champions League =

2007 GCC Champions League
Tournament details
- Teams: 12 (from AFC/UAFA confederations)

Final positions
- Champions: (United Arab Emirates) Al-Jazira (1st title)
- Runners-up: (Saudi Arabia) Al-Ettifaq

The 23rd GCC Champions League (Arabic: دوري أبطال مجلس التعاون الخليجي) was the 23rd edition of the GCC Champions League for clubs of the Gulf Cooperation Council nations.

The 2007 edition was won by United Arab Emirates side Al-Jazira for the first time.

== The groups ==
Group A	Group B	Group C
(Bahrain) Al-Najma (Qatar) Al-Wakrah (United Arab Emirates) Al-Jazira (Saudi Arabia) Al-Ettifaq	(Saudi Arabia) Al-Hilal (Qatar) Umm-Salal (Oman) Muscat; Al Kuwait Kaifan	(Oman) Al-Nasr (Bahrain) Al-Muharraq (United Arab Emirates) Sharjah; Al Arabi Kuwait

== Results ==
=== Group A ===
(In Abu Dhabi)

Team	Pld	W	D	L	GF	GA	GD	Pts
(United Arab Emirates) Al-Jazira	3	2	1	0	6	2	+4	7
(Saudi Arabia) Al-Ettifaq	3	2	1	0	5	2	+3	7
(Bahrain) Al-Najma	3	1	0	2	3	7	–4	3
(Qatar) Al-Wakrah	3	0	0	3	4	7	–3	0

=== Group B ===
(In Doha)

Team	Pld	W	D	L	GF	GA	GD	Pts
(Saudi Arabia) Al-Hilal	3	3	0	0	5	1	+4	9
Al Kuwait	3	2	0	1	4	3	+1	6
(Oman) Muscat	3	1	0	2	3	4	–1	3
(Qatar) Umm-Salal	3	0	0	3	1	5	–4	0

=== Group C ===
Team	Pld	W	D	L	GF	GA	GD	Pts
(Oman) Al-Nasr	3	2	1	0	6	2	+4	7
(Bahrain) Al-Muharraq	3	0	3	0	5	5	0	3
Al Arabi Kuwait	3	0	2	1	3	4	–1	2
(United Arab Emirates) Sharjah	3	0	2	1	4	7	–3	2

== Semi-finals ==
=== 1st legs ===
October 23, 2007

Al-Jazira (United Arab Emirates)	2–0	(Oman) Al-Nasr

October 23, 2007

Al-Ettifaq (Saudi Arabia)	1–1	(Saudi Arabia) Al-Hilal

=== 2nd legs ===
November 25, 2007

Al-Nasr (Oman)	0–1	(United Arab Emirates) Al-Jazira

November 27, 2007

Al-Hilal (Saudi Arabia)	0–1	(Saudi Arabia) Al-Ettifaq

== Final ==
December 24, 2007

Al-Ettifaq (Saudi Arabia)	2–0	(United Arab Emirates) Al-Jazira

December 31, 2007

Al-Jazira (United Arab Emirates)	3–1	(Saudi Arabia) Al-Ettifaq
Penalties
	7–6

== Winner ==
GCC Champions League
2007 Winners

Al-Jazira
1st Title
