= 16th GCC Club Championship =

1999 GCC Club Championship
Tournament details
- Host country: Saudi Arabia
- Dates: 25 January - 5 February 1999
- Teams: 6 (from AFC/UAFA confederations)

Final positions
- Champions: (Saudi Arabia) Al-Ittihad (1st title)
- Runners-up: (Kuwait) Al-Salmiya

The 16th GCC Club Championship (Arabic: بطولة الأنديـة الخليجية أبطال الدوري) was the sixteenth edition of the GCC Club Championship for clubs of the Gulf Cooperation Council nations. It started on 25 January and finished with the final round on 5 February 1999, and all the matches were played in Jeddah, Saudi Arabia. Al-Ittihad won the title for the First time in their history.

== Results ==
Team	Pld	Pts	W	D	L	GF	GA	GD
(Saudi Arabia) Al-Ittihad	5	15	5	0	0	15	2	+13
(Kuwait) Al-Salmiya	5	12	4	0	1	9	3	+6
(Bahrain) Al-Riffa SC	5	9	3	0	2	12	6	+6
(Qatar) Al-Arabi	4	4	1	1	3	4	12	-8
(United Arab Emirates) Sharjah	1	2	0	2	3	6	12	-6
Oman Club	1	1	0	1	4	4	15	-11

=== Round 1 ===
25 January 1999	Oman Club	1–5	(Saudi Arabia) Al-Ittihad
20:10

26 January 1999	Al-Arabi (Qatar)	2–2	(United Arab Emirates) Sharjah
17:15

26 January 1999	Al-Riffa SC (Bahrain)	0–2	(Kuwait) Al-Salmiya
20:10

=== Round 2 ===
28 January 1999	Al-Arabi (Qatar)	0–3	(Saudi Arabia) Al-Ittihad
17:15

28 January 1999	Al-Riffa SC (Bahrain)	4–1	Oman Club
20:10

29 January 1999	Sharjah (United Arab Emirates)	0–3	(Kuwait) Al-Salmiya
20:10

=== Round 3 ===
30 January 1999	Al-Riffa SC (Bahrain)	0–2	(Saudi Arabia) Al-Ittihad
20:10

31 January 1999	Al-Salmiya (Kuwait)	2–0	(Qatar) Al-Arabi
17:15

31 January 1999	Sharjah (United Arab Emirates)	2–2	Oman Club
20:10

=== Round 4 ===
2 February 1999	Oman Club	0–2	(Qatar) Al-Arabi
17:15

2 February 1999	Al-Riffa SC (Bahrain)	3–1	(United Arab Emirates) Sharjah
20:10

3 February 1999	Al-Salmiya (Kuwait)	0–3	(Saudi Arabia) Al-Ittihad
20:10

=== Round 5 ===
4 February 1999	Al-Riffa SC (Bahrain)	5–0	(Qatar) Al-Arabi
20:10

5 February 1999	Oman Club	0–2	(Kuwait) Al-Salmiya
17:15

3 February 1999	Sharjah (United Arab Emirates)	1–2	(Saudi Arabia) Al-Ittihad
20:10
