= Saudi El Clasico =

Football rivalry in Saudi Arabia

- Native name: كلاسيكو السعودية (Clasico Alsaudia)
- Location: Saudi Arabia
- Teams: Al-Hilal; Al-Ittihad
- First meeting: Al-Ittihad 2–0 Al-Hilal; Friendly (27 July 1962)
- Latest meeting: Al-Ittihad 1–1 Al-Hilal; Pro League (12 February 2026)
- Stadiums: Kingdom Arena (Al-Hilal); King Abdullah Sports City (Al-Ittihad)

Statistics
- Total meetings: Official matches: 165; Unofficial matches: 15; Total matches: 180
- Most wins: Official matches: Al-Hilal (75); Unofficial matches: Al-Ittihad (9); Total matches: Al-Hilal (78)
- Top scorer: Salem Al-Dawsari (11 goals)
- Largest victory: Al-Hilal 5–0 Al-Ittihad; Pro League (10 December 2009)

Saudi El Clásico (Arabic: كلاسيكو السعودية) is the name given to any football match between rival clubs Al-Hilal and Al-Ittihad. It is contested at least twice a year in the Saudi Pro League competition and often in other competitions. The rivalry comes about as Riyadh and Jeddah are the two largest cities in Saudi Arabia.

== History ==
The first-ever match between these two teams was in 1957. The two teams played a friendly match in Al-Saban Stadium in Jeddah which ended in a 8-0 for Al-Ittihad. 1961 The two sides played again in a friendly match which ended 7-1 for Al-Ittihad. In 1964, both teams met in the final of the King Cup in what would be the first final between these two teams and the first official match. Al-Ittihad defeated Al-Hilal 3–0 in the Al-Sayegh stadium in Riyadh to lift their fourth title. Ahmed Bahja and Salem Al-Dawsari are the top scorers of the fixture with 10 goals each. The clubs have met each other in 11 finals, with Al-Hilal winning 6 and Al-Ittihad winning 5.

== Statistics ==
Statistics as of 22 February 2025.

Competitions	Matches	Al-Hilal Wins	Draws	Al-Ittihad Wins	Al-Hilal Goals	Al-Ittihad Goals
Saudi Pro League	107	49	28	30	160	123
King Cup	18	5	8	5	26	29
Crown Prince Cup	11	6	5	0	15	6
Saudi Super Cup	2	2	0	0	6	2
Federation Cup	16	8	2	6	22	19
AFC Champions League	6	3	1	2	8	6
Arab Competitions	5	2	1	2	8	5
Total official matches	165	75	45	45	245	190
Al-Maseef Cup	2	0	0	2	1	4
International Friendship Tournament	1	0	0	1	2	3
Together Against Terrorism Tournament	1	1	0	0	2	1
Friendlies	11	2	3	9	16	28
Total matches	180	78	48	57	266	216

=== Top scorers ===
Below is the list of players who have scored at least four goals in official meetings.

Position	Name	Team	Goals
1	(Saudi Arabia) Salem Al-Dawsari	Al-Hilal	11
2	(Morocco) Ahmed Bahja	Al-Hilal (6) Al-Ittihad (4)	10
3	(Saudi Arabia) Sameer Sultan	Al-Hilal	8
3	(Saudi Arabia) Abdullah Al-Jamaan	Al-Hilal	8
3	(Saudi Arabia) Al-Hasan Al-Yami	Al-Ittihad	8
3	(Brazil) Thiago Neves	Al-Hilal	8
3	(Brazil) Carlos Eduardo	Al-Hilal	8
8	(Saudi Arabia) Sami Al-Jaber	Al-Hilal	7
9	(Saudi Arabia) Hamzah Idris	Al-Ittihad	6
9	(Brazil) Sérgio Ricardo	Al-Hilal (3) Al-Ittihad (3)	6
9	(Saudi Arabia) Mohammed Noor	Al-Ittihad	6
9	(Saudi Arabia) Mohammad Al-Shalhoub	Al-Hilal	6
9	(Saudi Arabia) Nawaf Al-Abed	Al-Hilal	6
9	(Serbia) Aleksandar Mitrović	Al-Hilal	6

== Official match results ==
As of 21 February 2026. Source:

Dates are in dd/mm/yyyy form.

- SF = Semi-finals
- QF = Quarter-finals
- R16 = Round of 16
- R32 = Round of 32
- GS = Group stage
- R1 = Round 1
- R2 = Round 2
- PO = Play-offs

Al-Hilal win Draw Al-Ittihad win

Season	Competition	Date	Home team	Result	Away team
1964	King Cup Final	10-01-1964	Al-Ittihad	3–0	Al-Hilal
1965	King Cup Final	13-03-1965	Al-Hilal	1–1 (Note: Al-Hilal won 2–0 on penalties after both teams tied 1–1.)	Al-Ittihad
1976–77	Federation Cup QF	04-11-1976	Al-Hilal	2–1	Al-Ittihad
1976–77	Premier League	24-12-1976	Al-Ittihad	3–2	Al-Hilal
1976–77	Premier League	12-03-1977	Al-Hilal	2–0	Al-Ittihad
1977–78	Premier League	29-09-1977	Al-Ittihad	2–3	Al-Hilal
1977–78	Premier League	20-01-1978	Al-Hilal	0–1	Al-Ittihad
1978–79	Premier League	05-01-1979	Al-Hilal	3–1	Al-Ittihad
1978–79	Premier League	03-05-1979	Al-Ittihad	2–1	Al-Hilal
1978–79	King Cup R16	16-05-1977	Al-Hilal	2–2 (Note: Al-Ittihad won 9–8 on penalties after both teams tied 2–2.)	Al-Ittihad
1979–80	Premier League	27-12-1979	Al-Ittihad	3–3	Al-Hilal
1979–80	Premier League	23-03-1980	Al-Hilal	3–3	Al-Ittihad
1980–81	Premier League	30-10-1980	Al-Hilal	0–0	Al-Ittihad
1980–81	Premier League	25-12-1980	Al-Ittihad	2–3	Al-Hilal
1980–81	King Cup SF	08-05-1981	Al-Ittihad	1–2	Al-Hilal
1981–82	Premier League	16-12-1981	Al-Ittihad	2–2	Al-Hilal
1981–82	Premier League	26-01-1982	Al-Hilal	0–1	Al-Ittihad
1981–82	King Cup Final	07-05-1982	Al-Hilal	3–1	Al-Ittihad
1982–83	Premier League	21-01-1983	Al-Ittihad	3–5	Al-Hilal
1982–83	Premier League	17-03-1983	Al-Hilal	2–1	Al-Ittihad
1983–84	Premier League	18-11-1983	Al-Ittihad	1–1	Al-Hilal
1983–84	Premier League	26-01-1984	Al-Hilal	0–1	Al-Ittihad
1984–85	Premier League	11-10-1984	Al-Ittihad	0–3	Al-Hilal
1984–85	Premier League	25-01-1985	Al-Hilal	1–0	Al-Ittihad
1985–86	Premier League	03-12-1985	Al-Hilal	1–0	Al-Ittihad
1985–86	Premier League	14-12-1985	Al-Ittihad	0–0	Al-Hilal
1985–86	Federation Cup Final	20-03-1986	Al-Ittihad	0–0 (Note: Al-Ittihad won 3–2 on penalties after both teams tied 0–0.)	Al-Hilal
1986–87	Premier League	19-12-1986	Al-Ittihad	1–1	Al-Hilal
1986–87	Premier League	06-02-1987	Al-Hilal	5–2	Al-Ittihad
1987–88	Premier League	18-09-1987	Al-Hilal	0–1	Al-Ittihad
1987–88	Premier League	17-12-1987	Al-Ittihad	1–0	Al-Hilal
1988–89	Premier League	22-09-1988	Al-Hilal	0–1	Al-Ittihad
1988–89	Premier League	03-01-1989	Al-Ittihad	0–1	Al-Hilal
1989–90	Premier League	13-11-1989	Al-Ittihad	0–1	Al-Hilal
1989–90	Premier League	21-12-1989	Al-Hilal	0–1	Al-Ittihad
1990–91	Premier League	22-11-1990	Al-Ittihad	0–1	Al-Hilal
1990–91	Premier League	10-05-1991	Al-Hilal	1–0	Al-Ittihad
1990–91	Crown Prince Cup SF	15-08-1991	Al-Ittihad	1–1 (Note: Al-Ittihad won 8–7 on penalties after both teams tied 1–1.)	Al-Hilal
1991–92	Premier League	28-11-1991	Al-Hilal	0–0	Al-Ittihad
1991–92	Premier League	20-02-1992	Al-Ittihad	2–0	Al-Hilal
1992–93	Federation Cup GS	23-10-1992	Al-Ittihad	2–1	Al-Hilal
1992–93	Federation Cup GS	27-11-1992	Al-Hilal	1–0	Al-Ittihad
1992–93	Premier League	25-01-1993	Al-Ittihad	2–1	Al-Hilal
1992–93	Premier League	04-03-1993	Al-Hilal	2–1	Al-Ittihad
1992–93	Crown Prince Cup SF	15-06-1993	Al-Ittihad	0–0 (Note: Al-Ittihad won 4–3 on penalties after both teams tied 0–0.)	Al-Hilal
1992–93	Premier League SF	08-07-1993	Al-Ittihad	2–1	Al-Hilal
1992–93	Premier League SF	15-07-1993	Al-Hilal	1–0 (Note: Al-Hilal won 4–3 on penalties after both teams tied 2–2 on aggregate.)	Al-Ittihad
1993–94	Premier League	02-12-1993	Al-Ittihad	1–1	Al-Hilal
1993–94	Premier League	03-02-1994	Al-Hilal	3–1	Al-Ittihad
1994–95	Federation Cup GS	13-10-1994	Al-Ittihad	2–0	Al-Hilal
1994–95	Federation Cup GS	03-11-1994	Al-Hilal	2–1	Al-Ittihad
1994–95	Arab Club Champions Cup Final	30-11-1994	Al-Hilal	0–0 (Note: Al-Hilal won 4–3 on penalties after both teams tied 0–0.)	Al-Ittihad
1994–95	Premier League	26-12-1994	Al-Hilal	2–1	Al-Ittihad
1994–95	Premier League	28-03-1995	Al-Ittihad	1–1	Al-Hilal
1994–95	Crown Prince Cup SF	16-05-1995	Al-Ittihad	0–1	Al-Hilal
1995–96	Arab Super Cup	20-12-1995	Al-Hilal	4–1	Al-Ittihad
1995–96	Premier League	27-01-1996	Al-Ittihad	1–1	Al-Hilal
1995–96	Premier League	05-03-1996	Al-Hilal	0–1	Al-Ittihad
1995–96	Premier League SF	16-05-1996	Al-Hilal	1–0	Al-Ittihad
1995–96	Premier League SF	30-05-1996	Al-Ittihad	1–1	Al-Hilal
1996–97	Federation Cup GS	10-10-1996	Al-Ittihad	1–2	Al-Hilal
1996–97	Federation Cup GS	01-11-1996	Al-Hilal	1–0	Al-Ittihad
1996–97	Premier League	15-01-1997	Al-Ittihad	2–1	Al-Hilal
1996–97	Premier League	28-03-1997	Al-Hilal	0–2	Al-Ittihad
1996–97	Crown Prince Cup SF	09-05-1997	Al-Ittihad	0–0 (Note: Al-Ittihad won 4–1 on penalties after both teams tied 0–0.)	Al-Hilal
1996–97	Premier League Final	06-06-1997	Al-Ittihad	2–0	Al-Hilal
1997–98	Premier League	10-12-1997	Al-Ittihad	0–2	Al-Hilal
1997–98	Premier League	23-01-1998	Al-Hilal	0–0	Al-Ittihad
1998–99	Federation Cup GS	27-09-1998	Al-Ittihad	2–1	Al-Hilal
1998–99	Federation Cup GS	16-10-1998	Al-Hilal	0–2	Al-Ittihad
1998–99	Premier League	06-12-1998	Al-Hilal	3–1	Al-Ittihad
1998–99	Premier League	30-03-1999	Al-Ittihad	4–1	Al-Hilal
1999–2000	Federation Cup SF	20-09-1999	Al-Ittihad	1–2	Al-Hilal
1999–2000	Premier League	12-12-1999	Al-Ittihad	4–0	Al-Hilal
1999–2000	Premier League	01-03-2000	Al-Hilal	4–2	Al-Ittihad
1999–2000	Crown Prince Cup SF	14-04-2000	Al-Hilal	2–0	Al-Ittihad
2000–01	Federation Cup GS	20-09-2000	Al-Hilal	3–2	Al-Ittihad
2000–01	Federation Cup GS	15-10-2000	Al-Ittihad	1–1	Al-Hilal
2000–01	Premier League	11-02-2001	Al-Hilal	1–0	Al-Ittihad
2000–01	Premier League	26-02-2001	Al-Ittihad	1–2	Al-Hilal
2000–01	Asian Club Championship QF	09-03-2001	Al-Ittihad	2–0	Al-Hilal
2000–01	Crown Prince Cup SF	13-04-2001	Al-Ittihad	2–2 (Note: Al-Ittihad won 8–7 on penalties after both teams tied 2–2.)	Al-Hilal
2001–02	Federation Cup SF	30-09-2001	Al-Hilal	2–0	Al-Ittihad
2001–02	Premier League	22-11-2001	Al-Ittihad	1–1	Al-Hilal
2001–02	Premier League	16-03-2002	Al-Hilal	1–1	Al-Ittihad
2001–02	Premier League Final	01-05-2002	Al-Hilal	2–1	Al-Ittihad

Season	Competition	Date	Home team	Result	Away team
2002–03	Premier League	11-01-2003	Al-Ittihad	1–1	Al-Hilal
2002–03	Crown Prince Cup SF	29-03-2003	Al-Hilal	2–0	Al-Ittihad
2002–03	Premier League	08-05-2003	Al-Hilal	2–1	Al-Ittihad
2003–04	Premier League	23-10-2003	Al-Hilal	0–0	Al-Ittihad
2003–04	Federation Cup GS	19-12-2003	Al-Ittihad	2–3	Al-Hilal
2003–04	Federation Cup GS	31-12-2003	Al-Hilal	1–2	Al-Ittihad
2003–04	Premier League	11-04-2004	Al-Ittihad	1–0	Al-Hilal
2004–05	Premier League	30-01-2005	Al-Hilal	4–2	Al-Ittihad
2004–05	Crown Prince Cup SF	26-04-2005	Al-Hilal	1–0	Al-Ittihad
2004–05	Crown Prince Cup SF	30-04-2005	Al-Ittihad	1–1 (a.e.t.)	Al-Hilal
2004–05	Arab Champions League SF	09-05-2005	Al-Hilal	0–1	Al-Ittihad
2004–05	Arab Champions League SF	18-05-2005	Al-Ittihad	2–1	Al-Hilal
2004–05	Premier League	28-05-2005	Al-Ittihad	2–1	Al-Hilal
2004–05	Premier League SF	07-07-2005	Al-Hilal	1–0	Al-Ittihad
2005–06	Premier League	13-02-2006	Al-Ittihad	2–2	Al-Hilal
2005–06	Premier League	17-03-2006	Al-Hilal	0–1	Al-Ittihad
2005–06	Premier League SF	16-04-2006	Al-Hilal	2–1 (a.e.t.)	Al-Ittihad
2006–07	Premier League	29-10-2006	Al-Hilal	2–1	Al-Ittihad
2006–07	Premier League	16-02-2007	Al-Ittihad	1–2	Al-Hilal
2006–07	Premier League Final	01-06-2007	Al-Hilal	1–2	Al-Ittihad
2007–08	Premier League	01-12-2007	Al-Hilal	0–0	Al-Ittihad
2007–08	Premier League	13-04-2008	Al-Ittihad	0–1	Al-Hilal
2007–08	King Cup SF	01-05-2008	Al-Ittihad	4–1	Al-Hilal
2007–08	King Cup SF	11-05-2008	Al-Hilal	1–2	Al-Ittihad
2008–09	Pro League	04-12-2008	Al-Ittihad	0–0	Al-Hilal
2008–09	Pro League	12-04-2009	Al-Hilal	1–2	Al-Ittihad
2009–10	Pro League	10-12-2009	Al-Hilal	5–0	Al-Ittihad
2009–10	Pro League	18-03-2010	Al-Ittihad	2–1	Al-Hilal
2009–10	King Cup Final	07-05-2010	Al-Hilal	0–0 (Note: Al-Ittihad won 5–4 on penalties after both teams tied 0–0.)	Al-Ittihad
2010–11	Pro League	06-02-2011	Al-Ittihad	0–0	Al-Hilal
2010–11	Pro League	20-03-2011	Al-Hilal	0–0	Al-Ittihad
2010–11	AFC Champions League R16	24-05-2011	Al-Ittihad	3–1	Al-Hilal
2010–11	King Cup SF	15-06-2011	Al-Hilal	0–3	Al-Ittihad
2010–11	King Cup SF	19-06-2011	Al-Ittihad	1–1	Al-Hilal
2011–12	Pro League	26-12-2011	Al-Hilal	1–1	Al-Ittihad
2011–12	Crown Prince Cup SF	27-01-2012	Al-Hilal	2–0	Al-Ittihad
2011–12	Pro League	14-02-2012	Al-Ittihad	0–2	Al-Hilal
2011–12	King Cup QF	22-04-2012	Al-Ittihad	2–2	Al-Hilal
2011–12	King Cup QF	26-04-2012	Al-Hilal	1–1 (Note: Al-Hilal won on away goals after tied 3–3 on aggregate.)	Al-Ittihad
2012–13	Pro League	09-12-2012	Al-Ittihad	1–2	Al-Hilal
2012–13	Pro League	29-03-2013	Al-Hilal	4–2	Al-Ittihad
2012–13	King Cup QF	05-05-2013	Al-Ittihad	3–2	Al-Hilal
2012–13	King Cup QF	09-05-2013	Al-Hilal	1–1	Al-Ittihad
2013–14	Pro League	20-09-2013	Al-Hilal	5–2	Al-Ittihad
2013–14	Pro League	09-01-2014	Al-Ittihad	2–2	Al-Hilal
2014–15	Pro League	01-12-2014	Al-Ittihad	0–0	Al-Hilal
2014–15	Crown Prince Cup R16	23-12-2014	Al-Ittihad	2–3 (a.e.t.)	Al-Hilal
2014–15	Pro League	17-04-2015	Al-Hilal	3–0	Al-Ittihad
2014–15	King Cup SF	31-05-2015	Al-Hilal	4–1	Al-Ittihad
2015–16	Pro League	30-10-2015	Al-Ittihad	4–3	Al-Hilal
2015–16	Pro League	27-02-2016	Al-Hilal	0–1	Al-Ittihad
2016–17	Pro League	28-10-2016	Al-Hilal	0–2	Al-Ittihad
2016–17	Pro League	05-03-2017	Al-Ittihad	1–3	Al-Hilal
2017–18	Pro League	21-09-2017	Al-Ittihad	1–1	Al-Hilal
2017–18	Pro League	13-01-2018	Al-Hilal	1–1	Al-Ittihad
2018–19	Super Cup Final	18-08-2018	Al-Hilal	2–1	Al-Ittihad
2018–19	Pro League	25-10-2018	Al-Hilal	3–1	Al-Ittihad
2018–19	Pro League	21-02-2019	Al-Ittihad	0–2	Al-Hilal
2019–20	AFC Champions League QF	27-08-2019	Al-Ittihad	0–0	Al-Hilal
2019–20	AFC Champions League QF	17-09-2019	Al-Hilal	3–1	Al-Ittihad
2019–20	Pro League	21-09-2019	Al-Ittihad	1–3	Al-Hilal
2019–20	Pro League	22-02-2020	Al-Hilal	1–0	Al-Ittihad
2020–21	Pro League	26-12-2020	Al-Hilal	1–1	Al-Ittihad
2020–21	Pro League	09-04-2021	Al-Ittihad	2–0	Al-Hilal
2021–22	Pro League	08-03-2022	Al-Hilal	2–1	Al-Ittihad
2021–22	Pro League	23-05-2022	Al-Ittihad	1–3	Al-Hilal
2022–23	Pro League	05-01-2023	Al-Ittihad	0–1	Al-Hilal
2022–23	King Cup SF	23-04-2023	Al-Ittihad	0–1 (a.e.t.)	Al-Hilal
2022–23	Pro League	16-05-2023	Al-Hilal	2–2	Al-Ittihad
2023–24	Arab Club Champions Cup QF	05-08-2023	Al-Ittihad	1–3	Al-Hilal
2023–24	Pro League	01-09-2023	Al-Ittihad	3–4	Al-Hilal
2023–24	Pro League	01-03-2024	Al-Hilal	3–1	Al-Ittihad
2023–24	AFC Champions League QF	05-03-2024	Al-Hilal	2–0	Al-Ittihad
2023–24	AFC Champions League QF	12-03-2024	Al-Ittihad	0–2	Al-Hilal
2023–24	Super Cup Final	11-04-2024	Al-Ittihad	1–4	Al-Hilal
2023–24	King Cup SF	30-04-2024	Al-Ittihad	1–2	Al-Hilal
2024–25	Pro League	21-09-2024	Al-Hilal	3–1	Al-Ittihad
2024–25	King Cup QF	06-01-2025	Al-Hilal	2–2 (Note: Al-Ittihad won 3–1 on penalties after both teams tied 2–2.)	Al-Ittihad
2024–25	Pro League	20-02-2025	Al-Ittihad	4–1	Al-Hilal
2025–26	Pro League	24-10-2025	Al-Ittihad	0–2	Al-Hilal
2025–26	Pro League	21-02-2026	Al-Hilal	1–1	Al-Ittihad

=== Friendlies ===
Date	Matches			Result
Date	Team 1	Score	Team 2	Result
27 July 1962	Al-Ittihad	2–0	Al-Hilal	Friendly
24 June 1969	Al-Ittihad	1–1	Al-Hilal	Al-Maseef Cup
26 June 1969	Al-Ittihad	1–0	Al-Hilal	Al-Maseef Cup
18 August 1969	Al-Hilal	3–0	Al-Ittihad	Friendly
20 January 1971	Al-Ittihad	3–3	Al-Hilal	Friendly
15 March 1984	Al-Hilal	0–1	Al-Ittihad	Friendly
10 March 1986	Al-Ittihad	3–1	Al-Hilal	Friendly
22 July 1986	Al-Hilal	0–0	Al-Ittihad	Friendly
2 October 1995	Al-Ittihad	0–0	Al-Hilal	Friendly
17 April 1998	Al-Hilal	4–1	Al-Ittihad	Friendly
11 May 1998	Al-Ittihad	2–4	Al-Hilal	Friendly
9 November 1998	Al-Hilal	0–0	Al-Ittihad	Friendly
18 August 2004	Al-Ittihad	3-2	Al-Hilal	International Friendship Tournament
11 February 2005	Al-Hilal	2–1	Al-Ittihad	Together Against Terrorism Tournament

Al-Hilal wins	Draws	Al-Ittihad wins
4	5	5

== Honours ==
The rivalry reflected in "El Clásico" matches comes about as Al-Ittihad and Al-Hilal are the most successful football clubs in Saudi Arabia. As seen below, Al-Hilal leads the count in official titles won with 70 trophies, while Al-Ittihad has won 37 trophies. Only official trophies are counted.

Al–Hilal	Championship	Al–Ittihad	Official
International (official)
4	AFC Champions League	2	Yes
2	Asian Super Cup	0	Yes
2	Asian Cup Winners Cup	1	Yes
2	Arab Champions League	1	Yes
1	Arab Super Cup	0	Yes
1	Arab Cup Winners' Cup	0	Yes
2	Gulf Club Champions Cup	1	Yes
Domestic (official)
19	Saudi League	10	Yes
11	King's Cup	10	Yes
13	Crown Prince Cup	8	Yes
5	Super Cup	1	Yes
7	Federation cup	3	Not official since 2007
Other Domestic (Defunct, official)
1	Saudi Founder's Cup	0	Yes
Official Championships
70	Total	37	
