= Marinko Koljanin =

Croatian football manager and footballer

Personal information
- Date of birth: 17 November 1957 (age 68)
- Place of birth: Croatia
- Height: 1.87 m (6 ft 2 in)
- Position: Goalkeeper

Team information
- Current team: Orijent (TD)

Senior career*
Years	Team	Apps	(Gls)
-1986	NK Zagreb		
1986-1990	Casino Salzburg		
1990–1992	FC Puch		

Managerial career
- 1992–1995: Casino Salzburg (gk coach)
- 1995–1996: Vorwärts Steyr
- 1999–2002: LASK
- 2004–2007: Rijeka (general mngr)
- 2007–2008: Kazma
- 2010–2011: Al-Sahel
- 2011–2013: Al-Hazem
- 2013: Al-Hussein
- 2013–2014: Krk
- 2014: Al-Nasr
- 2018-: Orijent (techn dir)
- 2022-: Orijent
- * Club domestic league appearances and goals

Marinko Koljanin (born 17 November 1957) is a Croatian football manager, a former footballer and a former general manager of HNK Rijeka who was manager of Al-Nasr in Oman Professional League.

== Managerial career ==
Koljanin worked as an assistant to Otto Barić at Casino Salzburg and was on the bench during the club's 1994 UEFA Cup final loss when Barić was suspended. He later worked in the Middle East before taking up his first coaching job in Croatia with Krk in December 2013.

He left his role of vice-president of Orijent to replace Edo Flego as manager of the club's senior team in May 2022.
