= 12th GCC Club Championship =

1994 GCC Club Championship
Tournament details
- Host country: United Arab Emirates
- Dates: 5–16 December 1994
- Teams: 6 (from AFC/UAFA confederations)

Final positions
- Champions: (Kuwait) Kazma (2nd title)
- Runners-up: (Bahrain) Riffa

The 12th GCC Club Championship (Arabic: بطولة الأنديـة الخليجية أبطال الدوري) was the twelfth edition of the GCC Club Championship for clubs of the Gulf Cooperation Council nations. It started on 5 December and finished with the final round on 16 December 1994, and all the matches were played in Al Ain, United Arab Emirates. Kazma won the title for the second time in their history.

== Results ==
Team	Pld	W	D	L	GF	GA	GD	Pts
(Kuwait) Kazma	5	4	1	0	4	0	+4	9
(Bahrain) Riffa	5	3	0	2	7	4	+3	6
(Qatar) Al Arabi	5	2	1	2	4	4	0	5
(Saudi Arabia) Al Shabab	5	1	2	2	5	5	0	4
(United Arab Emirates) Al Ain	5	0	3	2	2	5	−3	3
(Oman) Dhofar	5	0	3	2	0	4	−4	3

== Winner ==
GCC Club Championship
1994 Winners

Kazma
2nd Title
