= Yahya Amer =

Saudi Arabian footballer

Personal information
- Date of birth: 1960 (age 65–66)
- Place of birth: Jeddah, Saudi Arabia
- Position: Midfielder

Senior career*
| Years | Team | Apps | (Gls) |
| 1979–1988 | Al-Ahli | | |

International career
| 1984–1985 | Saudi Arabia | 15 | (0) |
- * Club domestic league appearances and goals

Yahya Amer (Arabic: يحيى عامر) is a Saudi Arabian footballer who played as a midfielder for Al-Ahli and represented the Saudi Arabia national team in the 1984 Asian Cup.

== Honours ==
Al-Ahli

- Saudi Premier League: 1983–84
- King Cup: 1983
- Gulf Club Champions Cup: 1985

Saudi Arabia

- AFC Asian Cup: 1984
