= Hussain Mustahil =

Omani footballer (born 1980)

Personal information
- Full name: Hussain Mustahil Rabia
- Date of birth: 2 May 1980 (age 46)
- Place of birth: Salalah, Oman
- Height: 1.78 m (5 ft 10 in)
- Position: Defender

Youth career
- 1996–1998: Al-Nasr

Senior career*
Years	Team	Apps	(Gls)
1998–2003	Al-Nasr	?	
2003–2006	Khaitan	?	
2006–2007	Al-Nasr	?	
2007–2008	Al-Sahel	?	
2008–2009	Al-Nasr	?	
2009–2011	Al-Nasr	?	

International career
2001–2004	Oman	36	(0)
- * Club domestic league appearances and goals

Hussain Mustahil Rabia (Arabic: حسين مستهيل ربيعة; born 2 May 1980), commonly known as Hussain Mustahil, is a retired Omani footballer who last played for Al-Nasr S.C.S.C.

== International career ==
Hussain was part of the first team squad of the Oman national football team till 2006. He was selected for the national team for the first time in 2001. He has made appearances in the 2002 FIFA World Cup qualification, the 2006 FIFA World Cup qualification and the 2007 AFC Asian Cup qualification and has represented the national team in the 2007 AFC Asian Cup.

== Club career statistics ==
Club	Season	Division	League		Cup		Continental		Other		Total	
Club	Season	Division	Apps	Goals	Apps	Goals	Apps	Goals	Apps	Goals	Apps	Goals
Saham	2004–05	Omani League	-	0	-	3	0	0	-	0	-	3
Saham	2006–07	Omani League	-	4	-	0	0	0	-	0	-	4
Saham	2009–10	Omani League	-	1	-	0	0	0	-	0	-	1
Saham	2010–11	Omani League	-	1	-	0	0	0	-	0	-	1
Saham	Total		-	6	-	3	0	0	-	0	-	9
Career total			-	6	-	3	0	0	-	0	-	9
