= GFF Gulf Club Super Cup =

GFF Gulf Club Super Cup كأس السوبر الخليجي للأندية
- Organiser(s): Gulf Football Federation (GFF)
- Founded: 2026; 0 years ago
- Teams: 2
- 2026 GFF Gulf Club Super Cup

The GFF Gulf Club Super Cup is a biennial super cup football match organised by the Gulf Football Federation (GFF).

The match is contested by the winners of the previous two editions of the GFF Gulf Club Champions League. The inaugural edition was scheduled to be held on 13 August 2026 between Duhok and Al-Rayyan at Duhok Stadium, however has been postponed to a later date.

== Winners ==
GFF Gulf Club Super Cup matches
| Year | Country | Winner | Score | Runner-up | Country | Venue | Attendance |
|---|---|---|---|---|---|---|---|
| 2026 | TBD | | | | | Duhok Stadium, Iraq | TBD |
