= Al Nasr SCSC (Salalah) =

Omani sports club

Al-Nasr
- Full name: Al-Nasr Sports, Cultural and Social Club
- Nickname: Al-Malik (The King)
- Founded: May 20, 1970; 56 years ago
- Ground: Al-Saada Stadium; Salalah Sports Complex
- Capacity: 20,000; 8,000
- Chairman: Issam Abdullah AlShanfari
- Manager: Marinko Koljanin
- League: Oman Professional League
- 2025–26: 3rd of 12
Home colours	Away colours

Al-Nasr Sports, Cultural and Social Club (Arabic: نادي النصر الرياضي و الثقافي و الاجتماعي; also known locally as Al-Malik, or "The King", or just plainly as Al-Nasr) is an Omani sports club based in Salalah, in southern Oman. The club currently plays in the Oman Professional League, top division of Oman Football Association. Their home ground is Al-Saada Stadium, but they also recognize the older Salalah Sports Complex as their home ground. Both stadiums are government owned, but Al-Nasr S.C.S.C. also own their own personal stadium, sports equipment, and training facilities.

== History ==
Al-Nasr S.C.S.C. started off playing in the Al-Haffa district of Salalah organizing specific meetings to play beach soccer. The club was founded on 20 May 1972, and was registered on 26 June 2002. Al-Nasr shifted to playing on grass fields in order to become a professional club. The club name literally translates from "The Victory" in the Arabic language.

In 1972 Al-Nasr was merged with Al-Shate'a team to carry the name of Al-Nasr. With this merge, the club office moved from Al-Haffa region to Al-Jouf region, where the current headquarters of the club is located.

In 1986, Al-Nasr competed in the Gulf Club Champions Cup and finished with third place.

Al-Nasr, along with the neighbors Dhofar have been labelled as front runners of the Omani League, but as seen in the recent seasons, both the clubs performed horribly with Dhofar losing many games, and not going far in the Sultan Qaboos Cup, along with Al-Nasr who even got relegated in the 2010–11 season. In the 2008–09 season, Al-Nasr settled to the 10th position in the league which was one of their worst performances ever in the Omani League. In the 2009–10 season also they could make it only to the 7th position in the league and were knocked out by Muscat Club in the Round-of-16 in the Sultan Qaboos Cup. In the 2010–11 season they again had to fight a relegation battle but this time they couldn't make it and got relegated for the first time to the Second Division league. Then in the 2011–12 season they secured the 2nd position in the 2nd Division League and got promoted back to the Omani League (First Division). In the 2012–13 season they secured the 4th position in the Omani League.

== Being a multisport club ==
Al-Nasr S.C.S.C. have not only football in their list, but also hockey, volleyball, handball, basketball, badminton and squash.

== Crest and colours ==
Al-Nasr S.C.S.C. have been known to wear a full blue or white (Away) kit (usually a darker shade of blue), varying themselves from neighbors Al-Ittihad (Green), Dhofar S.C.S.C. (Red) and Salalah SC (Blue) kits. They have had many different sponsors over the years. As of now, Kelme provides them with kits.

=== Logo ===
Al-Nasr's logo has been recreated a few number of times. The most recent logo (as shown on this page) was created during the late 1980s or early 1990s.

== Honours and achievements ==
=== National titles ===
- Omani League (5):
  - Winners: 1979–80, 1980–81, 1988–89, 1997–98, 2003–04.
  - Runners-up: 1982–83, 1984–85, 1989–90 1998–99, 1999–00.
- Sultan Qaboos Cup (5):
  - Winners: 1995, 2000, 2002, 2005, 2017-18.
  - Runners-up: 1981, 1986, 1987, 1988, 1999, 2001.
- Oman Professional League Cup (1):
  - Winners: 2015-16.
  - Runners-up:
- Oman Super Cup (1):
  - Winners: 2018.
  - Runners-up: 2002.
- Oman First Division League (0):
  - Runners-up 2011–12

=== Youth ===
- Sultan Qaboos Cup (U-19) (2):
  - Winners 2000, 2001
- Oman Youth League (U-19) (1):
  - Winners 1997–98
- Oman Youth League (U-16) (3):
  - Winners 1985–86, 1990–91, 1998–99

=== Honours and achievements (other sports) ===
Hockey

- Oman Hockey Premier League (1):
  - Winners 2008
- Sultan Qaboos Cup (3):
  - Winners 2006, 2007, 2014
- National Youth Championship (U-19) (0):
  - Runners-up 2007
- Regional Youth Championship (U-19) (3):
  - Winners 2000, 2001, 2007
  - Runners-up 2003
- Regional Youth Championship (U-16) (1):
  - Winners 2007
  - Runners-up 2008

Handball

- Second Division League (1):
  - Winners 2005
- National Youth Championship (U-19) (1):
  - Winners 2005
- National Youth Championship (U-16) (0):
  - Runners-up 2003, 2004

Cycling

- Regional Championship (6):
  - Winners 2000, 2001, 2002, 2003, 2004, 2005

== Performance in international competitions ==
=== AFC competitions ===
- Asian Club Championship: 1 appearance

1990–91 : First Round

- Asian Cup Winners' Cup: 1 appearance

1996–97: Quarter-Finals

- AFC Cup: 4 appearances

2006 : Quarter-Finals

=== UAFA competitions ===
- Gulf Club Champions Cup: 2 appearances

2006 : Group Stage
2007 : Semi-Finals

== Players (2024) ==
=== First team squad ===
Note: Flags indicate national team as defined under FIFA eligibility rules; some limited exceptions apply. Players may hold more than one non-FIFA nationality.

No.	Pos.	Nation	Player
1	GK	OMA	Said Al-Sinani
2	DF	OMA	Mohmood Mabrook
3	DF	OMA	Anwar Al-Shakai
4	DF	OMA	Moayad Awad
6	MF	OMA	Amran Al-Hidi
7	MF	OMA	Muthanna Awad
8	MF	OMA	Abdullah Al-Maghani
9	FW	OMA	Waleed Al-Muslimi
10	MF	CIV	Carter Ahiro
11	MF	SEN	Massaily Boubacar
12	DF	OMA	Jasim Al-Noobi
13	DF	OMA	Omer Adil Ahmed
18	MF	OMA	Mohammed Al-Subaie
20	MF	BHR	Mahdi Al-Humaidan
21	DF	OMA	Bashar Al-Rawahi
22	GK	OMA	Mohammed Ahmed Fadel
24	MF	OMA	Ahmed Al-Siyabi
26	GK	OMA	Hassan Al Breiki
27	MF	OMA	Sultan Beit Rabie

No.	Pos.	Nation	Player
28	DF	OMA	Fahmi Durbin
29	DF	OMA	Mohammed Beit Mustahil
30	MF	OMA	Abdul Al-Shamas
33	DF	OMA	Ziyad Al-Rabsi
34	MF	OMA	Fahad Beit Obaidan
35	DF	OMA	Amer Beit Rabie
37	MF	OMA	Osama Mahdi Beit Samir
44	DF	OMA	Mana Sabeit
47	MF	OMA	Safwan Awad Khamis
49	MF	OMA	Faisal Al-Balushi
70	MF	OMA	Shahid Obaid
71	MF	OMA	Musab Al-Mamari
74	DF	OMA	Mohammed Ahmed Mustahil
77	MF	GHA	Philip Ackah
81	MF	OMA	Sultan Bin Ali
88	GK	OMA	Rashad Al-Habsi
—	MF	JOR	Aon Al-Maharmeh

== Personnel ==
=== Technical staff ===
Position	Name
Head coach
Goalkeeping coach	(Egypt) Gaber Al-Bilasy
Team Manager	(Oman) Hussain Mustahil
Club doctor	(Egypt) Imad Ahmed
Physiotherapist	(Egypt) Imad Mujahid

== See also ==
- List of football clubs in Oman
