= 1984 Arab Club Champions Cup =

بطولة الأندية العربية لأبطال الدوري 1984

Tournament details
- Host country: Saudi Arabia
- City: Dammam
- Dates: 13–20 September 1984
- Teams: 4 (from 2 confederations) (from 4 associations)
- Venue: 1 (in 1 host city)

Final positions
- Champions: (Saudi Arabia) Al-Ettifaq (1st title)
- Runners-up: (Morocco) Kénitra
- Third place: (Bahrain) West Riffa
- Fourth place: (Lebanon) Al-Ansar

Tournament statistics
- Matches played: 6
- Goals scored: 13 (2.17 per match)
- Top scorer: (Saudi Arabia) Jamal Mohammed (2 goals)
- Best player: (Morocco) Abdelfettah Mouddani

The 1984 Arab Club Champions Cup was the second edition of the Arab Club Champions Cup, and was held in the city of Dammam, Saudi Arabia - the home city of eventual winners Al-Ettifaq.

== Participants ==
Participants
Team	Qualifying method
(Lebanon) Al-Ansar	Invitation (no Lebanese championship)
(Bahrain) West Riffa	Bahraini Premier League 1981/82 Champion
(Morocco) Kénitra	Botola Pro 1981/82 Champion
(Saudi Arabia) Al-Ettifaq	Saudi Premier League 1982/83 Champion

== Fixtures and results ==
Team	Pld	W	D	L	GF	GA	GD	Pts
(Saudi Arabia) Al-Ettifaq	3	2	1	0	3	1	+2	5
(Morocco) Kénitra	3	2	0	1	4	2	+2	4
(Bahrain) West Riffa	3	0	2	1	3	5	−2	2
(Lebanon) Al-Ansar	3	0	1	2	3	5	−2	1

Al-Ansar (Lebanon)	1–2	(Morocco) Kénitra

Youth Care Stadium, Dammam

West Riffa (Bahrain)	1–1	(Saudi Arabia) Al-Ettifaq

Youth Care Stadium, Dammam

West Riffa (Bahrain)	2–2	(Lebanon) Al-Ansar

Youth Care Stadium, Dammam

Kénitra (Morocco)	0–1	(Saudi Arabia) Al-Ettifaq

Youth Care Stadium, Dammam

West Riffa (Bahrain)	0–2	(Morocco) Kénitra

Youth Care Stadium, Dammam

Al-Ettifaq (Saudi Arabia)	1–0	(Lebanon) Al-Ansar
Mohammed

Youth Care Stadium, Dammam

== Winner ==
1984 Arab Club Champions Cup
Winners

Al-Ettifaq
1st Title
