= 1982–83 Saudi Premier League =

Saudi Premier League
- Season: 1982–83
- Dates: 16 December 1982 – 8 April 1983
- Champions: Al-Ettifaq (1st title)
- Relegated: Ohod; Al-Rawdah
- Gulf Club Champions Cup: Al-Ettifaq
- Arab Club Champions Cup: Al-Ettifaq
- Matches: 90
- Goals: 218 (2.42 per match)
- Top goalscorer: Majed Abdullah (14 goals)
- Biggest home win: Al-Nassr 7–2 Al-Rawdah (18 February 1983)
- Biggest away win: Al-Ittihad 2–5 Al-Ahli (7 April 1983)
- Highest scoring: Al-Nassr 7–2 Al-Rawdah (18 February 1983)
- Longest winning run: 7 games Al-Hilal
- Longest unbeaten run: 18 games Al-Ettifaq
- Longest winless run: 15 games Ohod
- Longest losing run: 5 games Al-Nahda

The 1982–83 Saudi Premier League was the 7th season of Saudi Premier League since its establishment in 1976. Al-Ittihad were the defending champions, having won their 1st title in the previous season. The campaign began on 16 December 1982 and ended on 8 April 1983. The number of teams in the league was reduced from the previous season. The league was contested by 10 teams, the top 5 teams from Groups A and B.

== Overview ==
Going into the final matchday, Al-Hilal were leading the table with 1 point ahead of Al-Ettifaq. The two teams would face their city rivals in the final matchday on separate days. On 7 April 1983, Al-Ettifaq defeated Al-Nahda 2–0. This meant that Al-Hilal needed just a draw against Al-Nassr to secure the title, as they were ahead of Al-Ettifaq on goal difference as well. On 8 April 1983, Al-Nassr defeated Al-Hilal 2–1 to hand Al-Ettifaq their first league title. Al-Ettifaq ended the season without a single defeat and became the first Saudi team to ever do so. Al-Ettifaq also became the first team from Dammam to win the title.Khalil Al-Zayani also became the first Saudi Arabian manager to win the league title.

Ohod were the first team to be relegated following a 5–1 away defeat to Al-Shabab on 7 April 1983. The following day, Al-Rawdah were defeated by Al-Qadsiah 2–0 and were relegated.

By winning the league title this also meant that Al-Ettifaq would qualify for the 1983 Gulf Club Champions Cup and the 1984 Arab Club Champions Cup, which they went on to win as well.

On 1 April 1983, Abdullah Al-Suwailem, goalkeeper who played for Al-Shabab, assaulted referee Mohammed Foda during the match against Al-Hilal. During the 90th minute while the scores were still level at 1–1, Foda sent off Al-Suwailem for receiving a pass from the goalkeeper in the 18-yard box. Minutes later in the 2nd minute of stoppage Al-Hilal would go on and score the winner. Al-Suwailem then rushed towards the referee and assaulted him. He was eventually held back by the stadium security. Foda then immediately blew for the final whistle and Al-Shabab's players rushed towards the referee. Foda was escorted out of the stadium by the police. In the aftermath, the SAFF suspended four players from Al-Shabab and the perpetrator, Al-Suwailem, was put in prison.

The season was also marked by tragedy. On 14 March 1983, Al-Nassr goalkeeper Sultan Marzooq was killed in a car accident, while he was on his way to the team's training ground. He played his final match three days prior in a 3–3 draw against Al-Ahli.

== Clubs ==
Ten teams competed in the league – the top five teams from Groups A and B of the previous season. The top five teams from Group A were Al-Shabab, Al-Nassr, Al-Ettifaq, Ohod, and Al-Qadsiah. The top five teams from Group B were Al-Ittihad, Al-Hilal, Al-Nahda, Al-Ahli, and Al-Rawdah.

=== Stadiums and locations ===
Locations of teams in the 1982–83 Saudi Premier League

Club	Location	Stadium	Head coach
Al-Ahli	Jeddah	Youth Welfare Stadium in Jeddah	
Al-Ettifaq	Dammam	Youth Welfare Stadium in Dammam	(Saudi Arabia) Khalil Al-Zayani
Al-Hilal	Riyadh	Youth Welfare Stadium in Al-Malaz	(Hungary) László Kubala
Al-Ittihad	Jeddah	Youth Welfare Stadium in Jeddah	(Brazil) Chinesinho
Al-Nahda	Dammam	Youth Welfare Stadium in Dammam	
Al-Nassr	Riyadh	Youth Welfare Stadium in Al-Malaz	(Brazil) José Chira
Al-Qadsiah	Khobar	Youth Welfare Stadium in Dammam	
Al-Rawdah	Al-Jeshah	Al-Hasa Sports Center Stadium	
Al-Shabab	Riyadh	Youth Welfare Stadium in Al-Malaz	
Ohod	Medina	Youth Welfare Stadium in Medina	(Tunisia) Hameur Hizem

=== Foreign players ===
Club	Player 1	Player 2	Former players
Al-Ahli			
Al-Ettifaq			
Al-Hilal	(Tunisia) Ali Kaabi		
Al-Ittihad			
Al-Nahda			
Al-Nassr			
Al-Qadsiah			
Al-Rawdah			
Al-Shabab			
Ohod			

== League table ==
Pos	Team	Pld	W	D	L	GF	GA	GD	Pts	Qualification or relegation
1	Al-Ettifaq (C)	18	10	8	0	25	10	+15	28	Gulf Club Champions Cup and Arab Club Champions Cup
2	Al-Hilal	18	11	5	2	32	17	+15	27	
3	Al-Shabab	18	9	6	3	31	16	+15	24	
4	Al-Nassr	18	7	6	5	29	22	+7	20	
5	Al-Ahli	18	5	10	3	25	19	+6	20	
6	Al-Ittihad	18	5	6	7	22	26	−4	16	
7	Al-Qadsiah	18	3	8	7	19	22	−3	14	
8	Al-Nahda	18	3	5	10	10	21	−11	11	
9	Al-Rawdah (R)	18	1	9	8	12	32	−20	11	Relegated
10	Ohod (R)	18	2	5	11	13	33	−20	9	Relegated

Source: rsssf.com Al-Madina
(C) Champions; (R) Relegated
- Promoted: Al-Wehda, Al-Riyadh

Saudi Premier League
1982-83 winners

1st title

== Results ==
Home \ Away	AHL	ETT	HIL	ITT	NAH	NSR	QAD	RAW	SHB	OHD
Al-Ahli		1–1	0–1	1–1	2–1	3–3	1–1	1–1	1–0	4–2
Al-Ettifaq	1–0		0–0	1–0	1–0	3–1	2–0	1–1	2–2	1–0
Al-Hilal	1–1	0–0		2–1	3–1	1–2	2–2	4–1	2–3	2–0
Al-Ittihad	2–5	0–0	3–5		1–0	1–0	2–0	4–1	1–3	0–0
Al-Nahda	0–0	0–2	0–1	0–1		1–1	0–2	1–0	0–3	2–0
Al-Nassr	1–0	2–2	1–2	1–1	1–0		0–1	7–2	0–1	2–1
Al-Qadsiah	1–1	1–2	0–1	1–1	1–2	1–1		2–0	1–1	3–1
Al-Rawdah	1–1	2–2	0–2	2–1	0–0	0–0	1–1		0–0	0–2
Al-Shabab	0–0	0–1	1–2	2–0	1–1	3–2	2–2	3–0		5–1
Ohod	1–3	0–3	1–1	2–2	1–1	0–3	1–0	0–0	0–1	

Legend: Blue = home team win; Yellow = draw; Red = away team win.

== Season statistics ==
=== Top scorers ===
Rank	Player	Club	Goals
1	(Saudi Arabia) Majed Abdullah	Al-Nassr	14
2	(Saudi Arabia) Khalid Al-Ma'ajil	Al-Shabab	13
3	(Saudi Arabia) Jamal Mohammed	Al-Ettifaq	9
4	(Saudi Arabia) Abdullah Al-Jarbo'o	Al-Hilal	7
4	(Saudi Arabia) Talal Sobhi	Al-Ahli	7
6	(Saudi Arabia) Hamad Al-Dossari	Al-Qadsiah	6
6	(Saudi Arabia) Hussam Abu Dawood	Al-Ahli	6
8	(Saudi Arabia) Amin Dabo	Al-Ahli	5
8	(Saudi Arabia) Naif Marzooq	Al-Shabab	5
8	(Saudi Arabia) Abdulrahman Al-Qoosi	Al-Shabab	5

== See also ==
- 1983 King Cup
- 1983 Gulf Club Champions Cup
- 1984 Arab Club Champions Cup
