= Abdelfettah Mouddani =

Moroccan footballer

Personal information
- Date of birth: 30 July 1956 (age 70)
- Place of birth: Morocco
- Position: Goalkeeper

Senior career*
| Years | Team | Apps | (Gls) |
- KAC Kenitra

International career
- Morocco
- * Club domestic league appearances and goals

Abdelfettah Mouddani (born 30 July 1956) is a Moroccan football goalkeeper who played for Morocco in the 1986 FIFA World Cup. He also played for KAC Kenitra.
