= Abadi Al-Hathlool =

Saudi Arabian footballer

Abdullah Al-Hathlool
Personal information
- Full name: Abdullah Faraj Masoud Al-Hathlool
- Date of birth: 20 October 1964 (age 62)
- Place of birth: Riyadh, Saudi Arabia
- Position: Midfielder

Senior career*
Years	Team	Apps	(Gls)
1981–1991	Al-Hilal		

International career
1983–1986	Saudi Arabia	13	(0)
- * Club domestic league appearances and goals

Abdullah Faraj Al-Hathlool (Arabic: عبد الله فرج الهذلول; born 20 October 1964), known as Abadi Al-Hathlool, is a Saudi Arabian former footballer who played as a midfielder for Al-Hilal. He competed in the men's tournament at the 1984 Summer Olympics.
