= 1988 Arab Club Champions Cup =

بطولة الأندية العربية لأبطال الدوري 1988

Tournament details
- Host country: United Arab Emirates
- City: Sharjah
- Dates: 20 October – 4 November
- Teams: 10 (from 2 confederations) (from 9 associations)
- Venues: 2 (in 1 host city)

Final positions
- Champions: (Saudi Arabia) Al-Ettifaq (2nd title)
- Runners-up: (Tunisia) Club Africain
- Third place: (Iraq) Al-Shabab Baghdad
- Fourth place: (Oman) Fanja SC

Tournament statistics
- Matches played: 24
- Goals scored: 54 (2.25 per match)
- Top scorer: (Saudi Arabia) Sadoun Hamoud (5 goals)
- Best goalkeeper: (Saudi Arabia) Mubarak Al-Dosari

The 1988 Arab Club Champions Cup was played in United Arab Emirates in the city of Sharjah. Al-Ettifaq won the championship for the first time beating in the final Club Africain.

== Participants ==
Participants
Zone	Team	Qualifying method
	(United Arab Emirates) Sharjah SC	1986–87 UAE League winner and Hosts
	(Iraq) Al-Rasheed	Holders
Zone 1	(Kuwait) Kazma SC	1986–87 Kuwaiti Premier League winners
Zone 1	(Oman) Fanja SC	1986–87 Omani League winners
Zone 2	(Saudi Arabia) Al-Ettifaq	1986–87 Saudi Premier League winners
Zone 2	(Sudan) Al-Merrikh	Sudan Premier League runners-up
Zone 3	(Algeria) Mouloudia d'Oran	1986–87 Algerian Championship runners-up
Zone 3	(Morocco) KAC Marrakech	1986–87 Moroccan League runners up
Zone 3	(Mauritania) ASC Wharf	Mauritanian representative
Zone 3	(Tunisia) Club Africain	1986–87 Tunisian Championship runners-up
Zone 4	(Iraq) Al-Shabab Baghdad	1986–87 Iraqi League third place
Zone 4	(Jordan) Al-Dhifatain SC	1986–87 Jordan League winners
Zone 4	Palestine SC	West Bank Premier League representative
Zone 4	(Syria) Jableh SC	1986–87 Syrian Premier League winners

== Preliminary round ==
=== Zone 1 (Gulf Area) ===
Kazma SC and Fanja SC advanced to the final tournament.

=== Zone 2 (Red Sea) ===
Al-Ettifaq and Al-Merrikh advanced to the final tournament.

=== Zone 3 (North Africa) ===
Preliminary round tournament held in Tunis, Tunisia.

Team	Pld	W	D	L	GF	GA	GD	Pts
(Tunisia) Club Africain (H)	3	2	1	0	5	2	+3	5
(Morocco) KAC Marrakech	3	2	0	1	6	2	+4	4
(Algeria) Mouloudia d'Oran	3	1	1	1	9	2	+7	3
(Mauritania) ASC Wharf	3	0	0	3	0	13	−13	0
(Libya) Al-Nasr Benghazi (W)	0	0	0	0	0	0	0	0

(H) Hosts; (W) Withdrew
19 February 1988

Club Africain (Tunisia)	2 – 0	(Mauritania) ASC Wharf
Touati; ?

Stade El Menzah, Tunis
19 February 1988

Mouloudia d'Oran (Algeria)	0 – 1	(Morocco) KAC Marrakech
		Chaouch 82'

Stade El Menzah, Tunis

21 February 1988

Club Africain (Tunisia)	1 – 1	(Algeria) Mouloudia d'Oran
Yaâcoubi 4'		Amdouni 67' (c.s.c)

Stade El Menzah, Tunis
21 February 1988

KAC Marrakech (Morocco)	4 – 0	(Mauritania) ASC Wharf
Kiddi (?), 18', 67'

Stade El Menzah, Tunis

24 February 1988

Club Africain (Tunisia)	2 – 1	(Morocco) KAC Marrakech
Bouhali 25'; L. Rouissi 50'		Chaouch 34'

Stade El Menzah, Tunis
Referee: Omar Ali Shoqer (Saudi Arabia)
24 February 1988

Mouloudia d'Oran (Algeria)	8 – 0	(Mauritania) ASC Wharf
Mezoued 3', 46'; Meziane 15', 68'; Chérif El-Ouazzani 33'; Bouzerouata 84'; Foussi 86'

Stade El Menzah, Tunis

Club Africain and KAC Marrakech advanced to the final tournament.

=== Zone 4 (East Region) ===
Preliminary round tournament held in Damascus, Syria from 4 to 10 August 1988.

Team	Pld	W	D	L	GF	GA	GD	Pts
(Iraq) Al-Shabab Baghdad	3	2	1	0	5	1	+4	5
(Syria) Jableh SC	3	1	2	0	3	2	+1	4
(Jordan) Al-Dhifatain SC	3	1	0	2	2	5	−3	2
Palestine SC	3	0	1	2	0	2	−2	1

4 August 1988

Al-Shabab Baghdad (Iraq)	1 – 1	(Syria) Jableh SC
Gorgis (–)		Ramadan (–)

Damascus
4 August 1988

Al-Dhifatain SC (Jordan)	1 – 0	Palestine SC
Khass (–)

Damascus

7 August 1988

Al-Shabab Baghdad (Iraq)	1 – 0	Palestine SC
Hadi (–)

Damascus
7 August 1988

Jableh SC (Syria)	2 – 1	(Jordan) Al-Dhifatain SC
Ramadan (–)		Al-Masha (–)

Damascus

10 August 1988

Al-Shabab Baghdad (Iraq)	3 – 0	(Jordan) Al-Dhifatain SC
Abdel Reda (–); Jassem (–)

Damascus
10 August 1988

Jableh SC (Syria)	0 – 0	Palestine SC

Damascus

Al-Shabab Baghdad and Jableh SC advanced to the final tournament.

== Final tournament ==
Final tournament held in Sharjah, United Arab Emirates from 21 October to 4 November 1988.

=== Group stage ===
==== Group A ====
Team	Pld	W	D	L	GF	GA	GD	Pts
(Tunisia) Club Africain	4	2	2	0	5	2	+3	6
(Oman) Fanja SC	4	2	1	1	4	2	+2	5
(Iraq) Al-Rasheed	4	2	1	1	4	3	+1	5
(Syria) Jableh SC	4	1	1	2	3	6	−3	3
(Sudan) Al-Merrikh	4	0	1	3	3	6	−3	1

21 October 1988

Fanja SC (Oman)	2 – 0	(Syria) Jableh SC
Khamis 85'; Hamid 89'

Sharjah
22 October 1988

Club Africain (Tunisia)	2 – 1	(Sudan) Al-Merrikh
Yâakoubi 3'; Abdelhak 25'		Osama Suksuk 7'

Sharjah

24 October 1988

Club Africain (Tunisia)	2 – 0	(Syria) Jableh SC
Touati 30', 70'

Sharjah
24 October 1988

Al-Rasheed (Iraq)	2 – 1	(Oman) Fanja SC
Radhi 32', 53' (pen.)		Hamoud 9'

Sharjah

27 October 1988

Club Africain (Tunisia)	1 – 1	(Iraq) Al-Rasheed
Touati 55'		Radhi 45'

Sharjah
27 October 1988

Al-Merrikh (Sudan)	2 – 2	(Syria) Jableh SC
Osama Suksuk 3'; Abdelghani 79'		Shalbi 11'; Shehada 81'

Sharjah

29 October 1988

Al-Rasheed (Iraq)	1 – 0	(Sudan) Al-Merrikh
Radhi 88'

Sharjah
29 October 1988

Club Africain (Tunisia)	0 – 0	(Oman) Fanja SC

Sharjah

31 October 1988

Jableh SC (Syria)	1 – 0	(Iraq) Al-Rasheed
Ramadan 56'

Sharjah
1 November 1988

Fanja SC (Oman)	1 – 0	(Sudan) Al-Merrikh
Hamid 37'

Sharjah

==== Group B ====
Team	Pld	W	D	L	GF	GA	GD	Pts
(Saudi Arabia) Al-Ettifaq	4	2	2	0	8	5	+3	6
(Iraq) Al-Shabab Baghdad	4	1	2	1	4	3	+1	4
(Morocco) KAC Marrakech	4	1	2	1	1	1	0	4
(United Arab Emirates) Sharjah SC	4	1	2	1	4	5	−1	4
(Kuwait) Kazma SC	4	1	0	3	3	6	−3	2

20 October 1988

Sharjah SC (United Arab Emirates)	2 – 2	(Saudi Arabia) Al-Ettifaq
Mohammed 26'; Thani 85'		Saleh 19'; Al-Shaiha 40' (pen.)

Sharjah
21 October 1988

Al-Shabab Baghdad (Iraq)	0 – 0	(Morocco) KAC Marrakech

Sharjah

23 October 1988

Sharjah SC (United Arab Emirates)	0 – 2	(Iraq) Al-Shabab Baghdad
		Mohammed 36'; Hadi 69'

Sharjah
24 October 1988

KAC Marrakech (Morocco)	1 – 0	(Kuwait) Kazma SC
Kadi 39'

Sharjah

26 October 1988

Sharjah SC (United Arab Emirates)	2 – 1	(Kuwait) Kazma SC
Thani 7'; Al-Arsour 80'		Hamza 4'

Sharjah
26 October 1988

Al-Ettifaq (Saudi Arabia)	2 – 2	(Iraq) Al-Shabab Baghdad
Hamoud 4'; Al-Shaiha 15' (pen.)		Jasem 34'; Rahim 44'

Sharjah

28 October 1988

Sharjah SC (United Arab Emirates)	0 – 0	(Morocco) KAC Marrakech

Sharjah
28 October 1988

Al-Ettifaq (Saudi Arabia)	3 – 1	(Kuwait) Kazma SC
Hamoud 56', 63', 82'		Haji 77'

Sharjah

29 October 1988

Al-Ettifaq (Saudi Arabia)	1 – 0	(Morocco) KAC Marrakech
Al-Shaiha 70' (pen.)

Sharjah
1 November 1988

Al-Shabab Baghdad (Iraq)	0 – 1	(Kuwait) Kazma SC
		Al Rahman 23'

Sharjah

=== Knockout stage ===
Semi-finals
2 November – Sharjah
(Saudi Arabia) Al-Ettifaq	3
(Oman) Fanja SC	1
2 November – Sharjah
(Tunisia) Club Africain (p)	2 (4)
(Iraq) Al-Shabab	2 (2)

Final
4 November – Sharjah
(Saudi Arabia) Al-Ettifaq (p)	1 (4)
(Tunisia) Club Africain	1 (2)
Third place
4 November – Sharjah
(Iraq) Al-Shabab	3
(Oman) Fanja SC	2

==== Semi-finals ====
2 November 1988

Al-Ettifaq (Saudi Arabia)	3 – 1	(Oman) Fanja SC
Al-Dbikhi 10'; Al-Shaiha 18' (pen.); S. Hamoud 31'		M. A. Hamoud 75'

Sharjah

2 November 1988

Club Africain (Tunisia)	2 – 2	(Iraq) Al-Shabab Baghdad
Rasheed 25' (o.g.); Touati 55'		Almi 49' (o.g.); Hadi 83'
Penalties
	4 – 2

Sharjah

==== Third place match ====
4 November 1988

Al-Shabab Baghdad (Iraq)	3 – 2	(Oman) Fanja SC
Alawi 28'; Mohammed 58'; Raheem 60'		Khamis 80'; Al-Amburi 90'

Sharjah Stadium, Sharjah

==== Final ====
4 November 1988

Al-Ettifaq (Saudi Arabia)	1 – 1	(Tunisia) Club Africain
Al-Dbikhi 25'		Amdouni 18'
Penalties
Meflah (penalty scored)	4 – 2

Sharjah Stadium, Sharjah
Attendance: 27,500
Referee: Rachid Medjiba (Algeria)

== Winners ==
1988 Arab Club Champions Cup winners
(Saudi Arabia)
Al-Ettifaq
Second title
