= Karim Hadi =

Iraqi footballer

Personal information
- Full name: Karim Hadi Sharhan
- Date of birth: 1 February 1963 (age 63)
- Position: Forward

International career
Years	Team	Apps	(Gls)
1981–1987	Iraq		

Karim Hadi (born 1 February 1963) is a former Iraqi football forward. He competed in the 1985 Pan Arab Games. Hadi played for Iraq between 1981 and 1987.
