= 6th GCC Club Championship =

1988 GCC Club Championship
Tournament details
- Dates: 25 March – 5 April 1988
- Teams: 12 (from AFC/UAFA confederations)

Final positions
- Champions: (Saudi Arabia) Al-Ettifaq (2nd title)
- Runners-up: (Kuwait) Kazma

The 6th GCC Club Championship (Arabic: بطولة الأنديـة الخليجية أبطال الدوري) was the sixth edition of the GCC Club Championship for clubs of the Gulf Cooperation Council nations, held in 1988.

The tournament doubled up as the qualifying round of the 1988–89 Asian Club Championship. The winners would progress to the ACC's latter stages.

== Results ==
Team	Pts	Pld	W	D	L	GF	GA	GD
(Saudi Arabia) Al-Ettifaq	7	4	3	1	0	6	2	+4
(Kuwait) Kazma SC	7	4	3	1	0	9	2	+7
(United Arab Emirates) Sharjah FC	4	4	2	0	2	6	5	+1
(Oman) Fanja^{1}	2	4	1	0	3	3	8	−5
(Bahrain) West Riffa	0	4	0	0	4	1	8	−7

All match were played in Sharjah, United Arab Emirates.

March 25, 1988	Sharjah FC	2–0	West Riffa
March 26, 1988	Al-Ettifaq	1–0	Fanja
March 27, 1988	Kazma SC	2–0	West Riffa
March 28, 1988	Al-Ettifaq	1–0	Sharjah FC
March 29, 1988	Kazma SC	3–1	Fanja
March 30, 1988	Al-Ettifaq	3–1	West Riffa
March 31, 1988	Kazma SC	3–0	Sharjah FC
April 2, 1988	Fanja	1–0	West Riffa
April 3, 1988	Al-Ettifaq	1–1	Kazma SC
April 4, 1988	Sharjah FC	4–1	Fanja

Playoff for 1st place

April 5, 1988	Al-Ettifaq	2–1	Kazma SC

^{1} Al-Fanja played only for the GCC Tournament

== Winner ==
GCC Club Championship
1988 Winners

Al-Ettifaq
2nd Title
