= Muscat Club =

Omani sports club

Muscat Club نادي مسقط
- Full name: Muscat Club
- Nicknames: Faris Al-A'asima (Knight of the Capital)
- Founded: 15 February 2004; 22 years ago
- Ground: Sultan Qaboos Sports Complex; Royal Oman Police Stadium; Boshar, Muscat, Oman
- Capacity: 28,000; 18,000
- League: Oman First Division League
Home colours	Away colours

Muscat Club (Arabic: نادي مسقط) is an Omani sports club based in Muscat. The club's football section competes in the Oman First Division League, the second highest league of the Oman Football Association. The club was established in 2004, following the merger of two clubs, Al-Bustan and Roy. Their home ground is Sultan Qaboos Sports Complex. They also recognize the older Royal Oman Police Stadium as their home ground.

== Multisport club ==
Muscat Club also has sections in hockey, volleyball, handball, basketball, badminton and squash.

== Honours and achievements ==
=== Domestic ===
- Omani League
  - Winners (3): 1977–78, 2002–03, 2005–06
  - Runners-up (1): 2003–04
- Oman First Division League
  - Winners (1): 2014–15
- Sultan Qaboos Cup
  - Winners (1): 2003 (as Ruwi)
  - Runners-up (2): 2004, 2007
- Oman Super Cup
  - Winners (2): 2004, 2005

== Performance in international competitions ==
=== AFC competitions ===
- AFC Cup : 1 appearance

- 2007 : Group Stage

=== UAFA competitions ===
- Gulf Club Champions Cup: 3 appearances

- 2005 : 3rd Position
- 2006 : Group Stage
- 2007 : Group Stage
