= 1986–87 Saudi Premier League =

Saudi Professional League
- Season: 1986–87
- Champions: Al Ettifaq (2nd title)
- Relegated: Al-Ansar; Al-Raed
- Top goalscorer: Mohammad Suwaidi (17 goals)

The 1986–87 Saudi Premier League season reverted to a regular home and away league format instead of the previous season's group phases.

Al Ettifaq would win the title for the second time.

Newly promoted sides Al-Ansar and Al-Raed would be relegated at the first time of asking proving in the process that it is hard for promoted teams to survive in the first season as few teams have managed to achieve this feat.

Al-Raed were the second side, after Al Taawon to represent Buraydah in the top flight.

== Stadia and locations ==
Locations of teams in the 1986-87 Saudi Premier League

Club	Location	Stadium
Al-Ahli	Jeddah	Prince Abdullah Al-Faisal Stadium
Al-Ansar	Medina	Prince Mohammed bin Abdul Aziz Stadium
Al-Ettifaq	Dammam	Prince Mohamed bin Fahd Stadium
Al-Hilal	Riyadh	King Fahd Stadium
Al-Ittihad	Jeddah	Prince Abdullah Al-Faisal Stadium
Al-Nahda	Khobar	Prince Saud bin Jalawi Stadium
Al-Nassr	Riyadh	King Fahd Stadium
Al-Qadsiah	Al Khubar	Prince Saud bin Jalawi Stadium
Al-Raed	Buraydah	King Abdullah Sport City Stadium
Al-Shabab	Riyadh	King Fahd Stadium
Al-Ta'ee	Ha'il	Prince Abdul Aziz bin Musa'ed Stadium
Al-Wehda	Mecca	King Abdul Aziz Stadium

== League table ==
Pos	Team	Pld	Pts
1	Al Ettifaq	22	34
2	Al-Hilal	22	31
3	Al-Nassr	22	31
4	Al-Ta'ee	22	26
5	Al-Shabab	22	25
6	Al-Ahli	22	25
7	Al-Ittihad	22	23
8	Al-Wehda	22	20
9	Al-Qadsiah	22	19
10	Al-Nahda	22	14
11	Al-Ansar	22	8
12	Al-Raed	22	8

Source: rsssf.com
- Promoted: Al Kawkab, Ohod.
- Full records are not known at this time

Saudi Premier League
1986-87 winners
Al Ettifaq
2nd title
