= 2nd GCC Club Championship =

1983 GCC Club Championship
Tournament details
- Dates: 1983
- Teams: 12 (from AFC/UAFA confederations)

Final positions
- Champions: (Saudi Arabia) Al-Ettifaq (1st title)
- Runners-up: (Kuwait) Al-Arabi

The 2nd GCC Club Championship (Arabic: بطولة الأنديـة الخليجية أبطال الدوري) was the second edition of the GCC Club Championship for clubs of the Gulf Cooperation Council nations. It was held in 1983 and it was won by Saudi Arabian outfit Al-Ettifaq.
