= Al-Riffa SC =

- Full name: Al-Riffa Sports Club
- Short name: Riffa
- Founded: 1953; 73 years ago
- Ground: Bahrain National Stadium; Riffa
- Capacity: 15,000
- Chairman: Sh. Abdulla bin Khalid Al-Khalifa
- Manager: Mohamed Al Mashan
- League: Premier League
- 2025–26: Premier League, 3rd of 12

Al-Riffa Sports Club (Arabic: نادي الرفاع الرياضي) is a Bahraini professional football club based in Riffa, that competes in the Bahraini Premier League, the top flight of Bahraini football.

== History ==
The club was founded in 1953 as West Riffa Sports Club. In 2001, the club changed its name to Al-Riffa Sports Club.

== Stadium ==
Riffa use Bahrain National Stadium as their home ground, which has the capacity for nearly 24,000 spectators.

== Current squad ==
=== First-team squad ===
As of 12 June 2024

Note: Flags indicate national team as defined under FIFA eligibility rules; some limited exceptions apply. Players may hold more than one non-FIFA nationality.

No.	Pos.	Nation	Player
1	GK	LTU	Džiugas Bartkus
2	MF	BHR	Saud Al-Asam
3	DF	BHR	Salman Al-Qadhaib
4	DF	BHR	Sayed Baqer
6	DF	BHR	Ali Faraj
7	FW	BHR	Abdulaziz Khalid
10	MF	MLI	Ibrahima Tandia
11	MF	BHR	Abdulla Al Thawadi
12	DF	SRB	Lazar Đorđević
13	MF	BHR	Jasim Al-Shaikh
14	MF	BHR	Ali Haram
15	DF	BHR	Hamad Al-Shamsan
16	DF	BHR	Sayed Redha Isa
17	FW	BHR	Hashim Sayed Isa
18	FW	BHR	Ali Hasan Isa

No.	Pos.	Nation	Player
19	DF	BHR	Husein Al–Eker
20	FW	TUN	Aymen Harzi
21	MF	BHR	Yassine Benmansour
22	MF	BHR	Fahad Jassim
23	MF	BHR	Hamad Yasser
24	GK	BHR	Kareem Fardan
25	MF	BHR	Mohammed Qayoom
26	MF	BHR	Abdullah Al Jazeeri
28	DF	BHR	Hazza Ali
29	GK	BHR	Abdullah Al-Ahmad
30	MF	BHR	Saleh Mohamed
31	MF	BHR	Ahmad Al Ashban
36	GK	BHR	Omar Ghalam Mohammad
45	MF	BHR	Abdullah Ebedili
-	FW	ALG	Tayeb Meziani

== Achievements ==
The club's first international achievement was in 1982 when Riffa placed second in the GCC Club Cup. This was an important achievement for the club and Bahraini football in general as it helped the region take notice of the talent available in Bahrain.

=== Domestic ===
- Bahraini Premier League: 14
  - 1982, 1987, 1990, 1993, 1997, 1998, 2000, 2003, 2005, 2012, 2014, 2019, 2021, 2022.
- Bahraini King's Cup: 7
  - 1973, 1985, 1986, 1998, 2010, 2019, 2021.
- Bahraini FA Cup: 4
  - 2000, 2001, 2004, 2014.
- Bahraini Crown Prince Cup: 4
  - 2002, 2003, 2004, 2005.
- Bahraini Super Cup: 2
  - 2019, 2021.
- Khalid Bin Hamad Cup: 1
  - 2025-26

=== International ===
- (India) Scissors Cup: 1
  - 1997

== Performance in GCC competitions (As West Riffa SC) ==
GCC Club Championship
10 appearances

1992: Group stage
1995: Group stage
1999: Group stage
2001: Group stage
2005: Group stage
2006: Group stage
2009–10: Group stage
2011: Quarter-finals
2012: Quarter-finals
2024–25: Group stage
2025–26:

== Performance in AFC competitions ==
AFC Champions League
1 appearance

2004: Group stage

Asian Club Championship
5 appearances

1989: Qualifying stage
1992: Qualifying – 1st round
1995: Second round
1997: withdrew in First round
1999: First round

AFC Cup
7 appearances

2010: Semi-final
2013: Round of 16
2014: Round of 16
2015: Group stage
2020: Cancelled
2022: Zonal finals
2023–24: Zonal semifinals

== Notable managers ==
- (Netherlands) Theo Laseroms (1982–84)
- (Germany) Uli Maslo (1985–88), (1993–94)
- (Croatia) Rodion Gačanin (July 1, 2003 – June 30, 2005)
- (Croatia) Dragan Talajić (July 1, 2005 – June 30, 2006)
- (Netherlands) Eelco Schattorie (2006–07)
- (Croatia) Srećko Juričić (July 1, 2007 – Dec 31, 2007)
- (Netherlands) Wilco van Buuren (Youth Team Director)
- (Brazil) Julio Peixoto
- (Brazil) Stefano Impagliazzo (2011–13)
- (Romania) Florin Motroc (June 1, 2013 – 2014)
- (Bahrain) Ali Ashoor (2018–2022)
- (Spain) Carlos Inarejos (2024–2025)
