= GFF Gulf Club Champions League =

GFF Gulf Club Champions League دوري أبطال الخليج للأندية
- Organiser(s): Gulf Football Federation (GFF)
- Founded: 1982; 44 years ago
- Teams: 12
- Current champions: (Qatar) Al-Rayyan (1st title)
- Most championships: (Saudi Arabia) Al-Ahli (Saudi Arabia) Al-Ettifaq (United Arab Emirates) Shabab Al-Arabi (3 titles each)
- Broadcaster(s): Al-Kass beIN Sports
- 2026–27 GFF Gulf Club Champions League

The GFF Gulf Club Champions League (Arabic: دوري أبطال الخليج للأندية), formerly known as the GCC Champions League, is a regional football competition governed by the Gulf Football Federation (GFF) for clubs from its eight member nations.

The tournament was founded by the Gulf Cooperation Council (GCC) and was first organised in 1982. During its early years, the GCC Club Championship also acted as a qualification tournament for the Asian Club Championship. The last edition organised by the GCC was the 30th edition in 2015, which featured twelve teams, while its attempts to organise the 31st edition failed.

The tournament was relaunched by the AGCFF (now known as the GFF) for the 2024–25 season under the name Gulf Club Champions League, featuring eight teams. The number of teams was increased to twelve for the 2026–27 season. The winners of the competition qualify for the GFF Gulf Club Super Cup.

Al-Rayyan are the current champions, having beaten Al-Shabab in the 2026 final.

== Winners ==
GCC Club Championship
Year	Winner	Score	Runner-up	Venue	Top scorer
1982	(Kuwait) Al-Arabi	RR	(Bahrain) Al-Riffa	Home / Away format	Mansour Muftah, Daoud Mohamed (6 goals)
1983	(Saudi Arabia) Al-Ettifaq	1–0	(Kuwait) Al-Arabi	Khalifa International Stadium, Doha, Qatar	
1985	(Saudi Arabia) Al-Ahli	2–0	(Kuwait) Al-Arabi	Zabeel Stadium, Dubai, United Arab Emirates	
1986	(Saudi Arabia) Al-Hilal	RR	(Qatar) Al-Arabi	Riyadh, Saudi Arabia	
1987	(Kuwait) Kazma	RR	(Saudi Arabia) Al-Hilal	Kuwait City, Kuwait	
1988	(Saudi Arabia) Al-Ettifaq	RR	(Kuwait) Kazma	Sharjah, United Arab Emirates	
1989	(Oman) Fanja	1–1 (4–2 pen.)	(Bahrain) Al-Muharraq	Manama, Bahrain	
1991	(Qatar) Al-Sadd	RR	Bahrain SC	Doha, Qatar	
1992	(United Arab Emirates) Al-Shabab	RR	(Saudi Arabia) Al-Hilal	Muscat, Oman	Aissa Sangour, bekhit saad (2 goals)
1993	(Saudi Arabia) Al-Shabab	RR	(United Arab Emirates) Al-Shabab	Riyadh, Saudi Arabia	Aissa Sangour (4 goals)
1994	(Saudi Arabia) Al-Shabab	RR	(Kuwait) Al-Arabi	Kuwait City, Kuwait	Saeed Al-Owairan (4 goals)
1995	(Kuwait) Kazma	RR	(Bahrain) Al-Riffa	Al Ain, United Arab Emirates	Saleh Almesnad (5 goals)
1996	(Saudi Arabia) Al-Nassr	RR	(Oman) Dhofar	Riffa, Bahrain	
1997	(Saudi Arabia) Al-Nassr	RR	(Kuwait) Kazma	Doha, Qatar	
1998	(Saudi Arabia) Al-Hilal	RR	(Bahrain) East Riffa	Sur, Oman	
1999	(Saudi Arabia) Al-Ittihad	RR	(Kuwait) Al-Salmiya	Jeddah, Saudi Arabia	Rashad Jamal Salem (7 goals)
2000	(Kuwait) Al-Qadisiya	RR	(Saudi Arabia) Al-Hilal	Kuwait City, Kuwait	
2001	(United Arab Emirates) Al-Ain	RR	(Saudi Arabia) Al-Ittihad	Al Ain, United Arab Emirates	
2002	(Saudi Arabia) Al-Ahli	RR	(Bahrain) Al-Muharraq	Riffa, Bahrain	
2003	(Kuwait) Al-Arabi	RR	(Bahrain) Al-Muharraq	Doha, Qatar	
2005	(Kuwait) Al-Qadisiya	RR	(United Arab Emirates) Al-Wasl	Kuwait City. Kuwait	Alexandre Oliveira, Salman Isa (4 goals)
GCC Champions League
Year	Home team	Score	Away team	Venue	Top scorer
2006	(Kuwait) Al-Qadisiya	0–1	(Saudi Arabia) Al-Ettifaq	Mohammed Al-Hamad Stadium, Kuwait City	Saleh Bashir (5 goals)
2006	(Saudi Arabia) Al-Ettifaq	1–1	(Kuwait) Qadsia	Prince Mohamed bin Fahd Stadium, Dammam	Saleh Bashir (5 goals)
2006	Al-Ettifaq won 2 – 1 on aggregate.				Saleh Bashir (5 goals)
2007	(Saudi Arabia) Al-Ettifaq	2–0	(United Arab Emirates) Al-Jazira	Prince Mohamed bin Fahd Stadium, Dammam	Antonin Koutouan (6 goals)
2007	(United Arab Emirates) Al-Jazira	3–1	(Saudi Arabia) Al-Ettifaq	Mohammed Bin Zayed Stadium, Abu Dhabi	Antonin Koutouan (6 goals)
2007	Al-Jazira won 7 – 6 on penalties after a 3 – 3 draw on aggregate.				Antonin Koutouan (6 goals)
2008	(Saudi Arabia) Al-Ahli	1–0	(Saudi Arabia) Al-Nassr	Prince Abdullah Al Faisal Stadium, Jeddah	Bader Al-Mutawa (6 goals)
2008	(Saudi Arabia) Al-Nassr	0–2	(Saudi Arabia) Al-Ahli	Prince Faisal bin Fahd Stadium, Riyadh	Bader Al-Mutawa (6 goals)
2008	Al-Ahli won 3 – 0 on aggregate.				Bader Al-Mutawa (6 goals)
2009	Qatar SC	2–2	(United Arab Emirates) Al-Wasl	Suheim Bin Hamad Stadium, Doha	Saeed Al Kass (6 goals)
2009	(United Arab Emirates) Al-Wasl	1–1	Qatar SC	Zabeel Stadium, Dubai	Saeed Al Kass (6 goals)
2009	Al-Wasl won 3 – 3 on away goals.				Saeed Al Kass (6 goals)
2011	(United Arab Emirates) Al-Ahli	3–2	(United Arab Emirates) Al-Shabab	Al-Rashid Stadium, Dubai	Boris Kabi, Essa Obaid (4 goals)
2011	(United Arab Emirates) Al-Shabab	2–0	(United Arab Emirates) Al-Ahli	Maktoum Bin Rashid Al Maktoum Stadium, Dubai	Boris Kabi, Essa Obaid (4 goals)
2011	Al-Shabab won 4 – 3 on aggregate.				Boris Kabi, Essa Obaid (4 goals)
2012	(Bahrain) Al-Muharraq	1–3	(United Arab Emirates) Al-Wasl	Khalifa Sports City Stadium, isa town	Hussain Al-Musawi (8 goals)
2012	(United Arab Emirates) Al-Wasl	1–3	(Bahrain) Al-Muharraq	Zabeel Stadium, Dubai	Hussain Al-Musawi (8 goals)
2012	Al-Muharraq won 5 – 4 on penalties after a 4 – 4 draw on aggregate.				Hussain Al-Musawi (8 goals)
2013	(Qatar) Al-Khor	1–1	(United Arab Emirates) Baniyas	Al-Khor SC Stadium, Al Khor	Yahia Kébé (6 goals)
2013	(United Arab Emirates) Baniyas	2–0	(Qatar) Al-Khor	Baniyas Stadium, Abu Dhabi	Yahia Kébé (6 goals)
2013	Baniyas won 3 – 1 on aggregate.				Yahia Kébé (6 goals)
GCC Club Cup
Year	Winner	Score	Runner-up	Venue	Top scorer
2014	(United Arab Emirates) Al-Nasr	2–1	(Oman) Saham	Maktoum Bin Rashid Al Maktoum Stadium, Dubai, UAE	Léo Lima, Brett Holman, Carlos Villanueva (3 goals)
2015	(United Arab Emirates) Al-Shabab	1–1 (4–3 pen.)	(Oman) Al-Seeb	Al-Seeb Stadium, Seeb, Oman	Rodrigo Tabata (5 goals)
2016	Cancelled				
AGCFF Gulf Club Champions League
Season	Home team	Score	Away team	Venue	Top scorer
2024–25	(Kuwait) Al-Qadisiya	0–0	(Iraq) Duhok	Mohammed Al-Hamad Stadium, Kuwait City	Ali Mabkhout (4 goals)
2024–25	(Iraq) Duhok	2–1	(Kuwait) Al-Qadisiya	Duhok Stadium, Duhok	Ali Mabkhout (4 goals)
2024–25	Duhok won 2–1 on aggregate.				Ali Mabkhout (4 goals)
2025–26	(Qatar) Al-Rayyan	3–0	(Saudi Arabia) Al-Shabab	Ahmad bin Ali Stadium, Al-Rayyan	Abderrazak Hamdallah (7 goals)

== Performances ==
=== Performance by club ===
The following table lists clubs by the number of winners and runners-up in the competition.

Team	Winners	Runners-up	Winning years	Runners-up years
(Saudi Arabia) Al-Ettifaq	3	1	(1983, 1988, 2006)	(2007)
(United Arab Emirates) Al-Shabab	3	1	(1992, 2011, 2015)	(1993)
(Saudi Arabia) Al-Ahli	3	—	(1985, 2002, 2008)	—
(Saudi Arabia) Al-Hilal	2	3	(1986, 1998)	(1987, 1992, 2000)
(Kuwait) Al-Arabi	2	3	(1982, 2003)	(1983, 1985, 1994)
(Kuwait) Kazma	2	2	(1987, 1995)	(1988, 1997)
(Kuwait) Al-Qadisiya	2	2	(2000, 2005)	(2006, 2025)
(Saudi Arabia) Al-Shabab	2	1	(1993, 1994)	(2026)
(Saudi Arabia) Al-Nassr	2	1	(1996, 1997)	(2008)
(Bahrain) Al-Muharraq	1	3	(2012)	(1989, 2002, 2003)
(United Arab Emirates) Al-Wasl	1	2	(2009)	(2005, 2012)
(Saudi Arabia) Al-Ittihad	1	1	(1999)	(2001)
(Oman) Fanja	1	—	(1989)	—
(Qatar) Al-Sadd	1	—	(1991)	—
(United Arab Emirates) Al-Ain	1	—	(2001)	—
(United Arab Emirates) Al-Jazira	1	—	(2007)	—
(United Arab Emirates) Baniyas	1	—	(2013)	—
(United Arab Emirates) Al-Nasr	1	—	(2014)	—
(Iraq) Duhok	1	—	(2025)	—
(Qatar) Al-Rayyan	1	—	(2026)	—
(Bahrain) Al-Riffa	—	2	—	(1982, 1995)
(Qatar) Al-Arabi	—	1	—	(1986)
Bahrain SC	—	1	—	(1991)
(Oman) Dhofar	—	1	—	(1996)
(Bahrain) East Riffa	—	1	—	(1998)
(Kuwait) Al-Salmiya	—	1	—	(1999)
Qatar SC	—	1	—	(2009)
(United Arab Emirates) Al-Ahli	—	1	—	(2011)
(Qatar) Al-Khor	—	1	—	(2013)
(Oman) Saham	—	1	—	(2014)
(Oman) Al-Seeb	—	1	—	(2015)

=== Performance by nation ===
The following table lists countries by number of winners and runners-up in the competition. Saudi Arabia is the leader by nation with 13 titles.

#	Nation	Winners	Runners-up
1	Saudi Arabia	13	7
2	United Arab Emirates	8	4
3	Kuwait	6	8
4	Qatar	2	3
5	Bahrain	1	7
6	Oman	1	3
7	Iraq	1	0

== See also ==
- GFF Gulf Club Super Cup
- Arab Club Champions Cup
