= Kuwait Football Association =

Governing body of football in Kuwait

AFC
- Short name: KFA
- Founded: 1952
- Headquarters: Kuwait City, Kuwait
- FIFA affiliation: 1964
- AFC affiliation: 1964
- WAFF affiliation: 2010
- President: Sheikh Ahmad Al Yousef Al Sabah
- Website: kuwait-fa.org

The Kuwait Football Association (Arabic: الإتحاد الكويتي لكرة القدم) is the governing body of association football in Kuwait.

Kuwait has thrice been suspended by FIFA for political interference since 2007 and were allowed to participate in the 2011 Asian Cup qualifying campaign and other international competitions on a provisional basis.

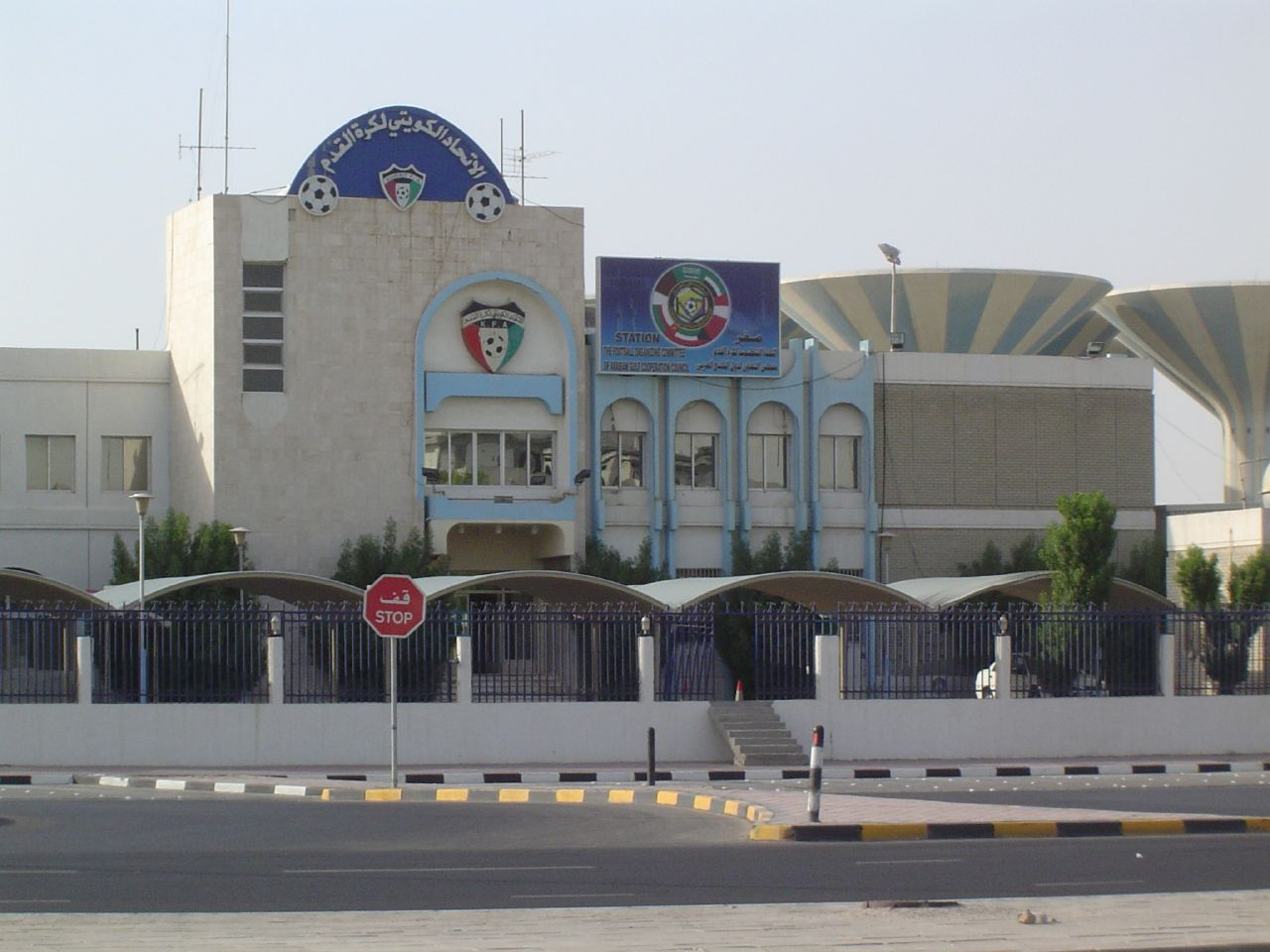
Headquarters of Kuwait Football Association

== Association staff ==
Name	Position	Source
(Kuwait) Sheikh Ahmad Al Yousef Al Sabah	President	
(Kuwait) Osama Husain	Vice-president	
(Kuwait) Saleh Almajroub	General secretary	
(Kuwait) Mubarak alenezi	Vice-president	
(Kuwait) Bader Abduljalil	Technical director	
(Portugal) Hélio Sousa	Team coach (men's)	
n/a	Team coach (women's)	
(Kuwait) Sattam Al-Sahli	Media/communications manager	
n/a	Futsal Coordinator	
(Kuwait) Basem AlWehidy	Director of Refereeing	

== FIFA suspension ==
Contrary to the road map established by FIFA and the AFC, the Kuwaiti Public Authority for Youth and Sport continued to interfere. Elections were held on 9 October in direct violation of the FIFA Executive Committee's May 2007 decision to the contrary. As a consequence, the committee recommended to the FIFA Executive Committee that the Kuwait Football Association be suspended. Kuwait's football federation board resigned days after world governing body FIFA suspended the Persian Gulf state. The suspension was lifted after the federation said it will ratify new statutes to prevent government interference in the sport as demanded by FIFA. "Otherwise FIFA will immediately suspend the (federation) again," FIFA said in a statement. The suspension was conditionally lifted and extended by the FIFA Congress in June 2009. FIFA was closely monitoring the situation within Kuwait.

On 16 October 2015, FIFA suspended Kuwait and all remaining results from AFC Asian Cup and FIFA World Cup qualification were added as forfeits while all Kuwaiti teams that were participating in international competitions were withdrawn. Kuwait tried to get the suspension lifted at the 66th FIFA Congress but this was rejected and therefore from the earlier announcement on 27 April 2016, the hosting of the Arabian Gulf Cup tournament was moved to Qatar. The suspension was eventually lifted on 6 December 2017 after Kuwait's adoption of a new sports law.

== Competitions ==
- Kuwait Premier League
- Kuwait Division One
- Kuwaiti Futsal League
- Kuwait Joint League (defunct)
- Kuwait Emir Cup
- Kuwait Crown Prince Cup
- Al Khurafi Cup (defunct)
- Kuwait Federation Cup (defunct)
- Kuwait Super Cup
- Kuwaiti Futsal Federation Cup
- Kuwaiti Futsal Super Cup

=== Friendly Competitions ===
- Kuwait Champions Challenge

== Current champions ==
Championship	Current champion(s)	Title number(s) won	Date won
Kuwait Premier League	Kuwait	21	June 29, 2026
Kuwait Division One	Sulaibikhat	4	20 August 2026
Kuwait Emir Cup	Kuwait	17	23 December 2025
Kuwait Crown Prince Cup	Al-Arabi	10	18 May 2026
Kuwait Super Cup	Qadsia	7	1 February 2026

== Defunct/paused ==
Championship	Final champion(s)	Title number(s) won	Date won	Previous Champions	Season
Kuwait Federation Cup	Qadsia	6	27 March 2023	Al-Nasr	2022–23
Al Khurafi Cup	Kazma	2	2007	Qadsia	2006–07
Kuwait Joint League	Kuwait	2	1989	Al-Arabi	1988–89
