= 2011–12 Kuwaiti Federation Cup =

The 5th Kuwaiti Federation Cup started on 5 September 2011.

The fifth Federation Cup is one of four competitions in the Kuwaiti 2011/2012 season. 14 clubs are taking part in the tournament.

They were divided into two groups of seven, and the winner and runner-up of each group will advance to the semi-finals.

== Group stage ==
=== Group 1 ===
Team	GP	W	D	L	GS	GA	GD	Pts
Al Shabab	6	3	2	1	8	9	-1	11
Al Kuwait	6	2	4	0	8	2	+6	10
Al Qadsia	6	2	3	1	9	8	+1	9
Al Jahra	6	3	0	3	6	7	-1	9
Tadamon	6	2	1	3	9	9	0	7
Al Arabi	6	2	1	3	6	8	-2	7
Al Naser	6	1	1	4	5	8	-3	4

2011-09-05
Al Kuwait	3–0	Tadamon
Al Arabi	0–1	Al Shabab
Al Naser	0–1	Al Jahra
2011-10-08
Al Arabi	1–1	Al Kuwait
Al Qadsia	3–3	Al Shabab
Al Naser	2–1	Tadamon
2011-10-14
Al Jahra	0–1	Tadamon
Al Qadsia	1–1	Al Kuwait
Al Naser	2–3	Al Arabi
2011-10-21
Al Kuwait	0–0	Al Shabab
Al Qadsia	2–1	Al Naser
2011-10-22
Al Arabi	0–2	Al Jahra
2011-10-28
Al Arabi	2–1	Tadamon
Al Jahra	2–1	Al Qadsia
Al Naser	0–1	Al Shabab
2011-11-12
Al Jahra	1–2	Al Shabab
Al Kuwait	0–0	Al Naser
Al Qadsia	1–1	Tadamon
2011-12-07
Al Arabi	0–1	Al Qadsia
Al Kuwait	3–0	Al Jahra
Tadamon	5–1	Al Shabab

=== Group 2 ===
Team	GP	W	D	L	GS	GA	GD	Pts
Salmiya	6	4	2	0	12	5	+7	14
Kazma	6	4	1	1	18	5	+13	13
Khaitan	6	4	0	2	9	13	-4	12
Al Yarmouk	6	2	1	3	7	7	0	7
Al Fahaheel	6	2	1	3	7	8	-1	7
Al Salibikhaet	6	2	0	4	8	12	-4	6
Al Sahel	6	0	1	5	1	12	-11	1

2011-09-05
Khaitan	1–0	Al Sahel
Al Salibikhaet	1–3	Salmiya
Al Fahaheel	3–1	Al Yarmouk
2011-10-09
Kazma	0–2	Al Yarmouk
Al Sahel	0–2	Salmiya
Al Fahaheel	1–0	Al Salibikhaet
2011-10-14
Kazma	4–0	Al Salibikhaet
2011-10-15
Khaitan	2–4	Salmiya
Al Fahaheel	1–1	Al Sahel
2011-10-21
Al Salibikhaet	2–0	Al Yarmouk
2011-10-22
Al Sahel	0–2	Kazma
Al Fahaheel	0–1	Khaitan
2011-10-28
Al Sahel	0–3	Al Yarmouk
Kazma	7–0	Khaitan
Al Fahaheel	0–1	Salmiya
2011-11-13
Al Sahel	0–3	Al Salibikhaet
Khaitan	1–0	Al Yarmouk
Salmiya	1–1	Kazma
2011-12-07
Al Salibikhaet	2–4	Khaitan
Salmiya	1–1	Al Yarmouk
Al Fahaheel	2–4	Kazma

== Semi-finals ==
=== 1st Legs ===
10 December 2011

Salmiya	0 – 0	Al Kuwait

10 December 2011

Al Shabab	1 – 4	Kazma

=== 2nd Legs ===
13 December 2011

Al Kuwait	4 – 1	Salmiya

13 December 2011

Kazma	10 – 0	Al Shabab

== Final ==
18 December 2011

Kazma	3 – 4	Al Kuwait
