= Issam El Adoua =

Moroccan footballer

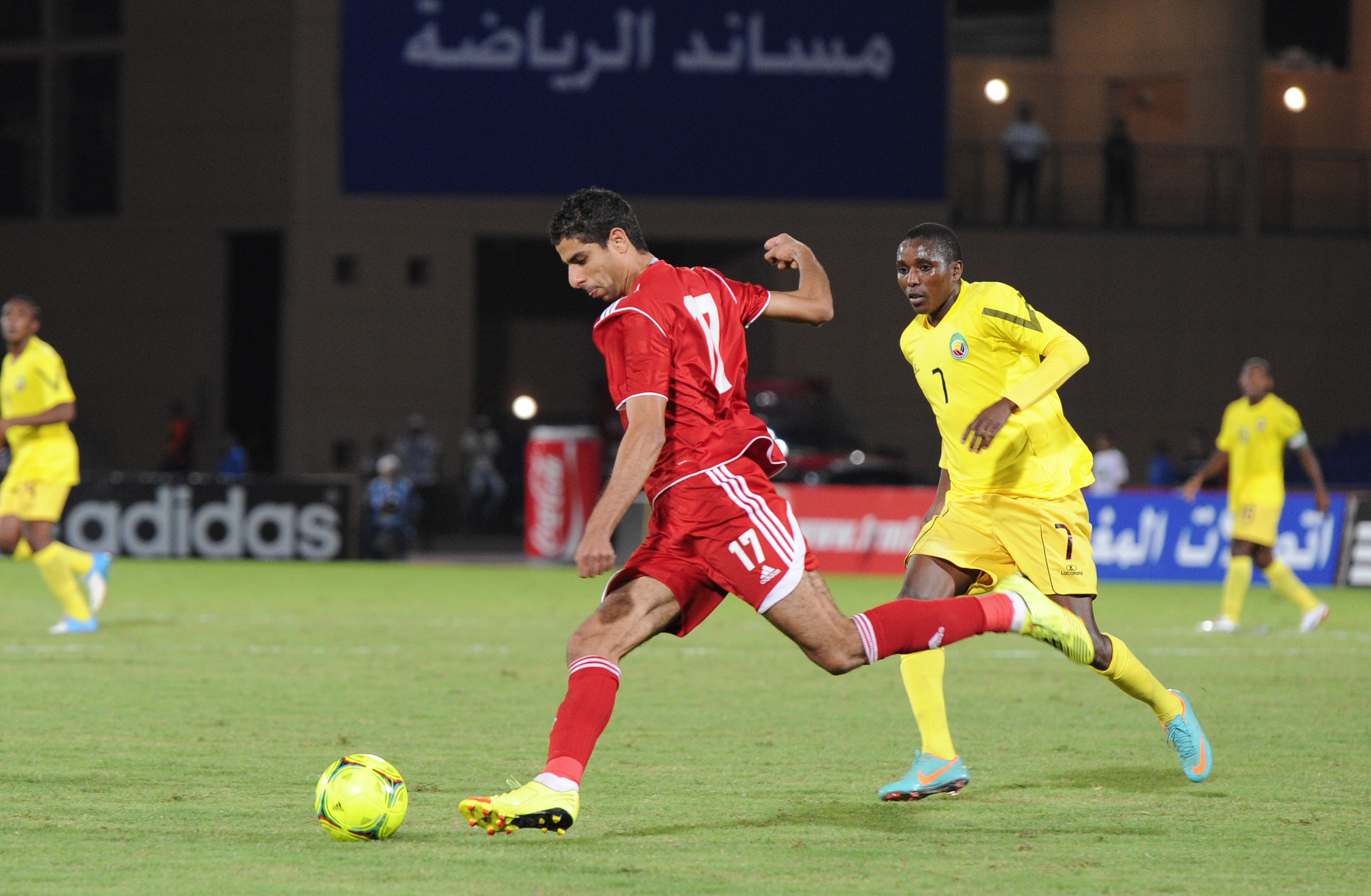

Personal information
- Date of birth: 9 December 1986 (age 39)
- Place of birth: Casablanca, Morocco
- Height: 1.92 m (6 ft 4 in)
- Positions: Centre-back; defensive midfielder

Youth career
- Wydad Casablanca

Senior career*
Years	Team	Apps	(Gls)
2004–2009	Wydad Casablanca		
2009–2010	Lens	0	(0)
2009	→ Lens B (loan)	4	(0)
2010	→ Nantes (loan)	8	(0)
2010–2011	Al Qadsia	18	(0)
2011–2013	Vitória Guimarães	41	(0)
2013–2015	Levante	22	(0)
2015	Chongqing Lifan	29	(1)
2016–2018	Al Dhafra	53	(2)
2018	Aves	13	(0)
2019	Kuwait SC	3	(0)
2019–2022	Al Dhafra	61	(2)

International career
2007–2008	Morocco U23	4	(0)
2009–2015	Morocco	35	(7)
- * Club domestic league appearances and goals

Issam El Adoua (born 9 December 1986) is a Moroccan former professional footballer who plays as a central defender.

== Club career ==
Born in Casablanca, El Adoua made his senior debuts for his hometown's Wydad Casablanca and formed a solid partnership with Hicham Louissi during his spell at the club.

On 25 May 2009, El Adoua moved abroad, signing a four-year deal with Ligue 1 side RC Lens. He made his debut for the side on 23 September, starting in a 4–3 away win over Montpellier HSC, for the campaign's Coupe de la Ligue; however, he failed to appear in the league, and was subsequently loaned to FC Nantes on 16 January of the following year. He appeared eight times in Ligue 2 before returning to his parent club.

In June 2010 El Adoua moved to Kuwait, joining Al Qadsia SC. In his one-year spell he won the Premier League and the Federation Cup. On 4 June 2011 he moved teams and countries again, signing a two-year deal with Primeira Liga side Vitória S.C.

On 18 June 2013, the free agent El Adoua joined Levante UD, signing a two-year deal. He made his La Liga debut on 17 August, coming on as a second-half substitute in a 7–0 away loss at FC Barcelona.

On 15 February 2015, El Adoua transferred to Chinese Super League side Chongqing Lifan.

== International career ==
After appearing for the Morocco under-23's, El Adoua made a full international debut for Morocco on 12 August 2009 in a friendly against Congo.

== Position ==
Usually a central defender, El Adoua can also play as a defensive midfielder.

== Honours ==
Wydad Casablanca

- GNF 1: 2005–06

Al Qadsia

- Kuwaiti Premier League: 2010–11
- Kuwait Federation Cup: 2010–11

Vitória Guimarães

- Portuguese Cup: 2012–13
