= 2008–09 Kuwait Federation Cup =

The 2nd Kuwaiti Federation Cup started on September 7, 2008.

The Second Federation Cup is one of four competitions in the Kuwaiti 2008/2009 season. Fourteen clubs took part in the tournament.

They were divided into two groups of seven, and the winner and runner-up of each group will advance to the semi-finals.

The cup is used as a curtain raiser to the Kuwaiti Premier League season.

== Group A ==
Final standings:

Team	Pld	W	D	L	GF	GA	GD	Pts
Al Kuwait	6	4	1	1	13	6	+7	13
(Kuwait) Al Qadsia	6	4	0	2	16	10	+6	12
(Kuwait) Al Salmiya	6	2	2	2	7	6	+1	8
(Kuwait) Al Naser	6	2	2	2	8	12	-4	8
(Kuwait) Al Yarmouk	6	2	1	3	10	13	-3	7
(Kuwait) Al Fahaheel	6	1	2	3	6	9	-3	5
(Kuwait) Tadamon	6	1	2	3	6	10	-4	5

== Group B ==
Final standings:

Team	Pld	W	D	L	GF	GA	GD	Pts
(Kuwait) Al Shabab	6	4	1	1	12	7	+5	13
(Kuwait) Kazma	6	4	1	1	10	5	+5	13
(Kuwait) Al Arabi	6	4	0	2	16	8	+8	12
(Kuwait) Khaitan	6	3	1	2	7	5	+2	10
(Kuwait) Sahel	6	2	1	3	9	9	0	7
(Kuwait) Sulaibikhat	6	1	0	5	8	18	-10	3
(Kuwait) Al Jahra	6	1	0	5	5	15	-10	3

== Semi-finals ==
12 January 2009

Al Kuwait	1 – 1 (5 – 6 pen.)	Kazma

12 January 2009

Al Shabab	1 - 3	Al Qadsia

== Final ==
21 January 2009

Kazma	0 - 1	Al Qadsia
