= 2010 Kuwait Crown Prince Cup =

The 2010 Kuwaiti Crown Prince Cup is a cup competition involving teams from the Kuwaiti Premier League and the Kuwaiti Division One league. It has been moved from its regular slot at the end of the domestic league campaigns and into the midseason domestic league break.

The 2010 edition is the 17th edition to be held.

== First round ==
12 teams play a knockout tie. 6 clubs advance to the next round. Games played between 6 March and 7 March.

Tie no	Home team	Score	Away team
1	Al Fahaheel	3 – 2	Khaitan
2	Al Naser	0 - 1	Al Arabi
3	Al Shabab	2 - 3	Tadamon
4	Al Kuwait Kaifan	3 - 0	Al Salmiya
5	Al Jahra	3 - 1	Sahel
6	Al Yarmouk	3 - 1	Sulaibikhat

== Quarter-finals ==
8 teams play a knockout tie. 4 clubs advance to the next round.

Tie no	Home team	Score	Away team
1	Al Qadisiya Kuwait	3 - 1	Al Fahaheel
2	Tadamon	0 - 1	Al Arabi
3	Kazma Sporting Club	0 - 1	Al Jahra
4	Al Yarmouk	0 - 3	Al Kuwait Kaifan

== Semi-finals ==
4 teams play a knockout tie. Winners advance to the final

Tie no	Home team	Score	Away team
1	Al Jahra	1 - 2	Al Kuwait Kaifan
2	Al Qadisiya Kuwait	0 - 1	Al Arabi

== Final ==
Tie no	Home team	Score	Away team
1	Al Arabi	2 - 2 (2-3 pens)	Al Kuwait Kaifan
