= 2009–10 Kuwaiti Federation Cup =

Football tournament

The 3rd Kuwaiti Federation Cup started on October 2, 2009.

The third Federation Cup is one of four competitions in the Kuwaiti 2009/2010 season. 14 clubs are taking part in the tournament.

They were divided into two groups of seven, and the winner and runner-up of each group will advance to the semi-finals.

The cup is used as a curtain raiser to the Kuwaiti Premier League season.

== Groups ==
Group 1	Group 2
Salmiya; Al Yarmouk; Al Shabab; Al Jahra; Kazma; Al Naser; Al Qadsia	Sahel; Tadamon; Al Fahaheel; Khaitan; Al Arabi; Al Kuwait; Al Salibikhaet

== Fixtures and results ==
=== Group 1 ===
Team	Pld	W	D	L	GF	GA	GD	Pts
Al Qadsia	6	4	2	0	18	10	+8	14
Kazma	6	4	1	1	17	13	+4	13
Al Jahra	6	2	2	2	14	13	+1	8
Salmiya	6	2	1	3	14	11	+3	7
Al Yarmouk	6	2	1	3	10	17	-7	7
Al Naser	6	2	0	4	6	9	-3	6
Al Shabab	6	1	1	4	5	11	-6	4

October 2, 2009
Al Qadsia	3–3	Salmiya
Kazma	3–3	Al Jahra
Al Yarmouk	0–0	Al Shabab
October 6, 2009
Al Naser	1–0	Salmiya
Al Qadsia	5–2	Al Yarmouk
Al Jahra	3–1	Al Shabab
October 11, 2009
Kazma	1–0	Al Naser
October 12, 2009
Al Qadsia	1–0	Al Shabab
Al Jahra	2–7	Salmiya
October 24, 2009
Al Naser	2–3	Al Shabab
Al Jahra	5–0	Al Yarmouk
Kazma	2–1	Salmiya
October 31, 2009
Al Yarmouk	2–1	Salmiya
Al Jahra	0–1	Al Naser
Kazma	3–5	Al Qadsia
November 5, 2009
Al Yarmouk	4–5	Kazma
Al Shabab	1–2	Salmiya
Al Naser	1–3	Al Qadsia
November 10, 2009
Al Naser	1–2	Al Yarmouk
Al Shabab	0–3	Kazma
Al Jahra	1–1	Al Qadsia

=== Group 2 ===
Team	Pld	W	D	L	GF	GA	GD	Pts
Al Kuwait	6	4	2	0	8	1	+7	14
Al Arabi	6	3	3	0	6	2	+4	12
Sahel	6	2	1	3	7	8	-1	7
Khaitan	6	1	4	1	4	6	-2	7
Al Salibikhaet	6	2	0	4	5	7	-2	6
Tadamon	6	1	2	3	2	5	-3	5
Al Fahaheel	6	1	2	3	2	5	-4	5

October 3, 2009
Khaitan	2–0	Al Salibikhaet
Tadamon	1–0	Al Fahaheel
Al Arabi	3–1	Sahel
October 7, 2009
Al Fahaheel	0–0	Al Arabi
Sahel	0–2	Al Salibikhaet
Khaitan	0–4	Al Kuwait
October 11, 2009
Al Salibikhaet	0–1	Al Fahaheel
Al Kuwait	1–0	Sahel
Al Arabi	1–0	Tadamon
October 24, 2009
Al Fahaheel	1–2	Al Kuwait
October 25, 2009
Al Salibikhaet	2–1	Tadamon
Sahel	2–2	Khaitan
October 30, 2009
Al Arabi	2–1	Al Salibikhaet
Al Kuwait	0–0	Tadamon
Al Fahaheel	0–0	Khaitan
November 6, 2009
Khaitan	0–0	Tadamon
Al Kuwait	0–0	Al Arabi
Al Fahaheel	0–2	Sahel
November 11, 2009
Sahel	2–0	Tadamon
Al Kuwait	1–0	Al Salibikhaet
Khaitan	0–0	Al Arabi

== Semi-finals ==
18 November 2009

Al Kuwait	2 – 2 (4 – 3 pen.)	Kazma

18 November 2009

Al Qadsia	0 - 2	Al Arabi

== Final ==
21 November 2009

Al Kuwait	0 – 0 (7 – 6 pen.)	Al Arabi
