= 2008 Kuwait Federation Cup =

The 1st Kuwaiti Federation Cup was held between January 1, 2008 and February 5, 2008.

The First Federation Cup was one of four competitions in the Kuwaiti 2007/2008 season, all 14 clubs participated in the championship. They were divided into two groups of seven, and the winner and runner-up of each group advanced to the semi-finals.

Al Qadsia won this season's Federation Cup after overcoming Al Kuwait 4-3 in penalties.

== Group A ==
Team	Pld	W	D	L	GF	GA	GD	Pts
Al Kuwait	6	5	0	1	13	6	+7	15
(Kuwait) Al Arabi	6	3	2	1	10	6	+4	11
(Kuwait) Kazma	6	3	1	2	7	6	+1	10
(Kuwait) Sulaibikhat	6	3	1	2	8	8	0	10
(Kuwait) Al Fahaheel	6	3	0	3	10	10	0	9
(Kuwait) Al Yarmouk	6	1	0	5	5	10	-5	3
(Kuwait) Sahel	6	0	2	4	1	8	-7	2

== Group B ==
Team	Pld	W	D	L	GF	GA	GD	Pts
(Kuwait) Al Qadsia	6	4	1	1	15	6	+9	13
(Kuwait) Al Jahra	6	4	0	2	6	6	0	12
(Kuwait) Al Salmiya	6	3	2	1	10	7	+3	11
(Kuwait) Khaitan	6	3	0	3	10	13	-3	9
(Kuwait) Al Naser	6	2	1	3	4	5	-1	7
(Kuwait) Al Shabab	6	1	2	3	2	5	-3	5
(Kuwait) Tadamon	6	0	2	4	5	10	-5	2

== Semi-finals ==
All times given as local time (UTC+3)

31 January 2008
16:30

Al Kuwait	1 – 1 (aet) (3 – 1 pen.)	(Kuwait) Al Jahra
Khalid Ajab 33'		Yousef Aawd 16'

Mohammed Al-Hamad Stadium, Kuwait

1 February 2008
16:30

(Kuwait) Al Qadsia	2 – 1	(Kuwait) Al Arabi
Talal Yousef 43'; Hamed Al Enezi 54'		Firas Al Khatib 32'

Thamir Stadium, Kuwait

== Third place play-off ==
4 February 2008
16:45

Al Jahra	1 – 1 (5 – 4 pen.)	Al Arabi
Mohammed Al Ajmy 35'		Abdullah Al Hadad 59'

Mohammed Al-Hamad Stadium, Kuwait

== Final ==
5 February 2008
18:00

Al Kuwait	1 – 1 (3 – 4 pen.)	Al Qadsia
Ziad Jaziri 46'		Hamed Al Enezi 93'
Penalties
Ziad Jaziri (penalty scored); Mishal Hameed (penalty scored); Abdullah Nahar (penalty scored); Abdulrahman Al Awadhi (penalty missed); Samer Al Marta (penalty missed)	3–4	(penalty scored) Talal Yousef; (penalty scored) Hamed Al Enezi; (penalty missed) Fahad Al Ansari; (penalty scored) Mladen; (penalty scored) Musaed Neda

Al-Sadaqua Walsalam Stadium, Kuwait
Referee: Thamir Al Enezi

== Top scorers ==
Scorer	Goals	Team
(Kuwait) Khaled Ajab	7	Al Kuwait
(Tunisia) Selim Ben Achour	6	Qadsia
(Brazil) Gláucio	5	Al Salmiya
(Tunisia) Saud Freyan	4	Al Fahaheel
(Syria) Firas Al Khatib	4	Al Arabi
(Kuwait) Yousef Awad	3	Al-Jahra
(Kuwait) Mohammed Yousuf	3	Khaitan
(Bahrain) Ismaeel Abdullatif	3	Al Arabi
(Oman) Younis Al Mushaifri	3	Kazma
(Bahrain) A'ala Hubail	3	Al Kuwait
