= 2012–13 Kuwaiti Federation Cup =

Tournament details
- Country: Kuwait

Final positions
- Champions: Qadsia
- Runners-up: Al-Arabi

Tournament statistics
- Matches played: 182
- Goals scored: 257 (1.41 per match)

The 2012–13 Kuwaiti Federation Cup is the 6th edition to be held and started on the 22 November 2012.

This edition saw all 14 teams play in one group, rather than the previous editions which had two groups of 7 sides.

Al Kuwait went into the competition as defending champions.

== Standings ==
Team	GP	W	D	L	GS	GA	GD	Pts
Al Qadsia	13	12	0	1	35	6	+29	36
Al Arabi	13	8	3	2	23	14	+9	27
Al Kuwait	13	8	1	4	17	8	+9	25
Al Fahaheel	13	7	3	3	20	12	+8	24
Al Naser	13	6	2	4	26	17	+9	23
Al Salibikhaet	13	5	5	3	17	16	+1	20
Salmiya	13	5	4	4	16	15	+1	19
Al Shabab	13	5	2	6	19	25	-6	17
Kazma	13	4	4	5	18	17	+1	16
Khaitan	13	4	4	5	19	21	-2	16
Al Jahra	13	4	2	7	14	27	-13	14
Al Yarmouk	13	1	4	8	11	23	-12	7
Tadamon	13	1	3	9	13	30	-17	6
Al Sahel	13	1	1	11	9	26	-17	4

== Results ==
2012-11-22
Al Sahel	1–4	Al Qadsia
Al Salibikhaet	1–2	Al Naser
Al Shabab	3–1	Al Jahra
2012-11-23
Al Kuwait	1–0	Tadamon
Kazma	1–1	Al Yarmouk
Salmiya	1–1	Khaitan
Al Arabi	1–3	Al Fahaheel
2012-11-29
Tadamon	1–2	Al Qadsia
Al Fahaheel	2–0	Al Sahel
Al Kuwait	5–2	Khaitan
2012-11-30
Al Jahra	3–2	Al Naser
Kazma	2–4	Al Salibikhaet
Salmiya	1–1	Khaitan
Al Arabi	3–2	Al Shabab
2012-12-07
Al Fahaheel	0–3	Al Qadsia
Al Kuwait	1–0	Al Yarmouk
Khaitan	2–1	Tadamon
Al Sahel	1–0	Al Shabab
2012-12-09
Al Salibikhaet	0–0	Salmiya
Al Arabi	3–1	Al Naser
Al Jahra	1–1	Kazma
2012-12-13
Al Jahra	1–0	Salmiya
Al Kuwait	0–1	Al Salibikhaet
Al Arabi	0–0	Kazma
Al Fahaheel	1–0	Al Shabab
Al Qadsia	2–0	Khaitan
Tadamon	2–2	Al Yarmouk
Al Naser	4–1	Al Sahel
2012-12-19
Al Sahel	0–2	Kazma
Al Kuwait	2–0	Al Jahra
Al Arabi	2–1	Salmiya
Al Salibikhaet	1–0	Tadamon
Al Shabab	0–5	Al Qadsia
Khaitan	1–1	Al Yarmouk
Al Fahaheel	2–2	Al Naser
2012-12-22
Al Naser	1–1	Al Shabab
Al Yarmouk	0–3	Al Qadsia
Al Salibikhaet	2–2	Khaitan
2012-12-23
Al Kuwait	0–1	Al Arabi
Al Sahel	1–2	Salmiya
Al Fahaheel	0–3	Kazma
Al Jahra	3–1	Tadamon
2012-12-27
Al Shabab	2–3	Kazma
Al Naser	0–3	Al Qadsia
Al Salibikhaet	1–1	Al Yarmouk
2012-12-28
Al Fahaheel	0–0	Salmiya
Al Jahra	0–2	Khaitan
Al Arabi	2–2	Tadamon
Al Kuwait	1–0	Al Sahel
2013-01-02
Al Jahra	2–0	Al Yarmouk
Al Naser	2–0	Kazma
Al Salibikhaet	0–4	Al Qadsia
2013-01-03
Al Arabi	1–0	Khaitan
Salmiya	3–0	Al Shabab
Al Kuwait	0–1	Al Fahaheel
Al Sahel	0–1	Tadamon
2013-01-08
Al Arabi	2–1	Al Yarmouk
Al Kuwait	1–1	Al Shabab
Al Fahaheel	3–0	Tadamon
Al Sahel	1–3	Khaitan
Al Jahra	0–2	Al Salibikhaet
Al Naser	0–1	Salmiya
Al Qadsia	0–4	Kazma
2013-01-13
Al Arabi	0–0	Al Salibikhaet
Al Kuwait	0–1	Al Naser
Al Jahra	0–1	Al Qadsia
Kazma	1–2	Salmiya
Tadamon	2–3	Al Shabab
Al Fahaheel	2–1	Khaitan
Al Sahel	0–1	Al Yarmouk
2013-01-17
Al Arabi	6–1	Al Jahra
Al Kuwait	1–0	Kazma
Al Salibikhaet	3–2	Al Sahel
Al Qadsia	2–1	Salmiya
Al Naser	5–0	Tadamon
Al Shabab	1–3	Khaitan
Al Fahaheel	1–0	Al Yarmouk
2013-02-02
Al Sahel	2–2	Al Jahra
Tadamon	1–4	Kazma
Al Arabi	1–3	Al Qadsia
Al Kuwait	3–0	Salmiya
Al Naser	3–1	Khaitan
Al Yarmouk	1–3	Al Shabab
Al Fahaheel	1–1	Al Salibikhaet
2013-03-20
Al Fahaheel	5–0	Al Jahra
Khaitan	1–1	Kazma
Al Kuwait	2–1	Al Qadsia
Al Arabi	1–0	Al Sahel
Al Naser	3–1	Al Yarmouk
Salmiya	2–2	Tadamon
Al Salibikhaet	1–2	Al Shabab
