= 2017–18 Kuwait Federation Cup =

Tournament details
- Country: Kuwait
- Teams: 15

Final positions
- Champions: Kazma SC (2nd title)
- Runners-up: Al-Shabab SC

Tournament statistics
- Matches played: 32
- Goals scored: 101 (3.16 per match)

The 10 edition of the revived Kuwait Federation Cup tournament saw all 15 Kuwaiti clubs participating in 3 groups.

== Group stage ==
=== Group A ===
Final Standings:

Team	Pld	W	D	L	GF	GA	GD	Pts
(Kuwait) Al-Fahaheel FC	4	2	2	0	7	4	3	8
(Kuwait) Al-Nasr SC	4	2	1	1	10	5	5	7
(Kuwait) Al-Tadamun SC	4	2	0	2	6	8	-2	6
(Kuwait) Al-Salmiya SC	4	2	0	2	9	9	0	6
(Kuwait) Al-Sahel SC	4	0	1	3	6	12	-6	1

=== Group B ===
Final Standings:

Team	Pld	W	D	L	GF	GA	GD	Pts
(Kuwait) Kazma SC	4	3	1	0	7	4	3	8
(Kuwait) Qadsia SC	4	3	1	0	6	1	5	8
(Kuwait) Al-Arabi SC	4	1	1	2	6	7	-1	4
(Kuwait) Burgan SC	4	1	1	2	4	7	-3	4
(Kuwait) Al-Sulaibikhat SC	4	0	0	4	1	9	-8	0

=== Group C ===
Final Standings:

Team	Pld	W	D	L	GF	GA	GD	Pts
(Kuwait) Al-Shabab SC	4	3	0	1	7	4	3	9
Kuwait SC	4	2	1	1	9	5	4	7
(Kuwait) Al-Jahra SC	4	2	1	1	5	4	1	7
(Kuwait) Al-Yarmouk SC	4	2	0	2	6	9	-3	6
(Kuwait) Khaitan SC	4	0	0	4	4	10	-4	0

== Knockout stage ==
All 3 top teams of each group advances and best 2nd placed team advances, a new draw is held.

Semi-Finals
H	Qadsia SC	0
A	Kazma SC	2
A	Al-Fahaheel FC	2
H	Al-Shabab SC	4

Final
H	Kazma SC	3 (4)
A	Al-Shabab SC	3 (2)
