= 2021–22 Kuwait Federation Cup =

Tournament details
- Country: Kuwait
- Teams: 15

Final positions
- Champions: Al-Nasr
- Runners-up: Al-Arabi

Tournament statistics
- Matches played: 32

The re-in-station of the Kuwait Federation Cup tournament saw all 15 kuwaiti clubs participating in 3 groups.

== Group stage ==
=== Group 1 ===
| Pos | Team | Pld | W | D | L | GF | GA | GD | Pts | Qualification or relegation |
|---|---|---|---|---|---|---|---|---|---|---|
| 1 | Al-Arabi (A) | 4 | 3 | 1 | 0 | 13 | 5 | +8 | 10 | Semi-finals |
| 2 | Kazma | 4 | 2 | 1 | 1 | 8 | 3 | +5 | 7 | |
| 3 | Burgan | 4 | 1 | 3 | 0 | 4 | 3 | +1 | 6 | |
| 4 | Al-Shabab | 4 | 1 | 0 | 3 | 3 | 10 | −7 | 3 | |
| 5 | Al-Sahel | 4 | 0 | 1 | 3 | 3 | 10 | −7 | 1 | |

Updated to match(es) played on unknown. Source:
(A) Advance to a further round

=== Group 2 ===
| Pos | Team | Pld | W | D | L | GF | GA | GD | Pts | Qualification or relegation |
|---|---|---|---|---|---|---|---|---|---|---|
| 1 | Al-Nasar (A) | 4 | 3 | 0 | 1 | 8 | 7 | +1 | 9 | Semi-finals |
| 2 | Al-Qadsia (A) | 4 | 3 | 0 | 1 | 11 | 8 | +3 | 9 | Semi-finals |
| 3 | Al Tadhamon | 4 | 1 | 2 | 1 | 7 | 5 | +2 | 5 | |
| 4 | Al-Fahaheel | 4 | 0 | 2 | 2 | 2 | 4 | −2 | 2 | |
| 5 | Al-Sulaibikhat | 4 | 0 | 2 | 2 | 4 | 8 | −4 | 2 | |

Updated to match(es) played on unknown. Source:
(A) Advance to a further round

=== Group 3 ===
| Pos | Team | Pld | W | D | L | GF | GA | GD | Pts | Qualification or relegation |
|---|---|---|---|---|---|---|---|---|---|---|
| 1 | Al-Kuwait (A) | 4 | 3 | 1 | 0 | 9 | 3 | +6 | 10 | Semi-finals |
| 2 | Khaitan | 4 | 2 | 1 | 1 | 6 | 5 | +1 | 7 | |
| 3 | Al-Salmiya | 4 | 2 | 1 | 1 | 6 | 5 | +1 | 7 | |
| 4 | Al-Jahra | 4 | 1 | 1 | 2 | 5 | 4 | +1 | 4 | |
| 5 | Al-Yarmouk | 4 | 0 | 0 | 4 | 4 | 11 | −7 | 0 | |

Updated to match(es) played on unknown. Source:
(A) Advance to a further round

== Knockout stage ==
All 3 top teams of each group advances and best 2nd placed team advances, a new draw is held.
