= 2018–19 Kuwait Federation Cup =

Tournament details
- Country: Kuwait
- Teams: 15

Final positions
- Champions: Qadsia SC (5th title)

Tournament statistics
- Matches played: 20
- Goals scored: 90 (4.5 per match)

The 2018–19 Kuwait Federation Cup tournament saw all 15 Kuwaiti clubs participating in 2 groups, rather than 3. Kazma SC are the defending champions.

== Group stage ==
Draw held on July 24

=== Group A ===
==== Final standings ====
Team	Pld	W	D	L	GF	GA	GD	Pts
(Kuwait) Al-Nasr SC	0	0	0	0	0	0	0	0
(Kuwait) Al-Shabab SC	0	0	0	0	0	0	0	0
(Kuwait) Al-Arabi SC	0	0	0	0	0	0	0	0
(Kuwait) Al-Sahel SC	0	0	0	0	0	0	0	0
(Kuwait) Qadsia SC	0	0	0	0	0	0	0	0
Kuwait SC	0	0	0	0	0	0	0	0
(Kuwait) Khaitan SC	0	0	0	0	0	0	0	0
(Kuwait) Al-Yarmouk SC	0	0	0	0	0	0	0	0

=== Group B ===
==== Final standings ====
Team	Pld	W	D	L	GF	GA	GD	Pts
(Kuwait) Al-Jahra SC	0	0	0	0	0	0	0	0
(Kuwait) Al-Fahaheel FC	0	0	0	0	0	0	0	0
(Kuwait) Burgan SC	0	0	0	0	0	0	0	0
(Kuwait) Al-Sulaibikhat SC	0	0	0	0	0	0	0	0
(Kuwait) Kazma SC	0	0	0	0	0	0	0	0
(Kuwait) Al-Salmiya SC	0	0	0	0	0	0	0	0
(Kuwait) Al-Tadamun SC	0	0	0	0	0	0	0	0
