= 2010–11 Kuwaiti Federation Cup =

Association football tournament in Kuwait

The 4th Kuwaiti Federation Cup started on 5 September 2010.

The fourth Federation Cup was one of four competitions in the Kuwaiti 2010/2011 season. 14 clubs participated in the tournament. They were divided into two groups of seven, and the winner and runner-up of each group advanced to the semi-finals.

== Group stage ==
=== Group 1 ===
Team	GP	W	D	L	GS	GA	GD	Pts
Al Qadsia	12	8	3	1	32	17	+15	27
Al Naser	12	8	2	1	26	11	+15	26
Kazma	12	6	3	3	30	10	+20	21
Al Arabi	12	5	4	3	21	17	+4	19
Salmiya	12	4	2	6	17	22	-5	14
Khaitan	12	1	2	9	9	31	-22	5
Al Yarmouk	12	1	2	9	9	36	−27	5

2010-09-05
Kazma	0–0	Al Arabi
Al Naser	4–0	Khaitan
Al Yarmouk	0–3	Salmiya
2010-09-17
Al Yarmouk	1–3	Khaitan
2010-09-25
Kazma	1–2	Al Naser
Al Qadsia	2–2	Al Arabi
2010-09-28
Al Qadsia	1–4	Al Naser
Salmiya	2–1	Khaitan
Al Yarmouk	0–1	Kazma
2010-10-01
Al Arabi	1–1	Al Naser
Al Qadsia	9–2	Al Yarmouk
Salmiya	2–1	Kazma
2010-10-09
Al Arabi	4–0	Al Yarmouk
Khaitan	0–5	Kazma
Salmiya	0–2	Al Qadsia
2010-10-30
Khaitan	2–3	Al Qadsia
2010-11-02
Al Arabi	2–1	Salmiya
Al Naser	2–0	Al Yarmouk
2010-11-07
Al Naser	2–0	Salmiya
Khaitan	0–5	Al Arabi
2010-11-20
Al Arabi	1–4	Kazma
Salmiya	1–1	Al Yarmouk
Khaitan	1–2	Al Naser
2010-11-24
Al Arabi	0–1	Al Qadsia
Al Naser	0–3	Kazma
Khaitan	0–1	Al Yarmouk
2010-11-28
Al Naser	1–3	Al Qadsia
Khaitan	0–3	Salmiya
Kazma	5–0	Al Yarmouk
2010-12-02
Kazma	1–2	Al Qadsia
2010-12-14
Al Naser	4–0	Al Arabi
Kazma	7–1	Salmiya
Al Yarmouk	2–2	Al Qadsia
2010-12-18
Kazma	1–1	Khaitan
Al Qadsia	2–1	Salmiya
Al Yarmouk	2–3	Al Arabi
2010-12-27
Al Yarmouk	0–3	Al Naser
Al Qadsia	4–1	Khaitan
Salmiya	2–3	Al Arabi
2011-01-02
Salmiya	1–1	Al Naser
Al Arabi	0–0	Khaitan
Al Qadsia	1–1	Kazma

=== Group 2 ===
Team	GP	W	D	L	GS	GA	GD	Pts
Al Kuwait	12	7	3	2	23	11	+12	24
Al Sahel ^{1}	12	5	3	4	23	24	-1	18
Tadamon	12	5	2	5	19	22	−3	17
Al Fahaheel	12	4	4	4	18	20	-2	16
Al Jahra	12	3	5	4	15	16	-1	14
Al Salibikhaet	12	4	2	6	20	23	-3	14
Al Shabab	12	3	3	6	21	23	-2	12

2010-09-06
Al Jahra	0–3	Al Sahel
Al Shabab	2–2	Al Salibikhaet
Tadamon	1–3	Al Fahaheel
2010-09-18
Al Kuwait	3–0	Al Fahaheel
Al Shabab	2–0	Al Jahra
Tadamon	1–1	Al Sahel
2010-09-27
Al Kuwait	5–1	Al Sahel
Al Shabab	4–2	Tadamon
Al Salibikhaet	2–3	Al Jahra
2010-10-02
Al Fahaheel	2–0	Al Sahel
Al Kuwait	2–0	Al Shabab
Al Salibikhaet	2–0	Tadamon
2010-10-10
Al Jahra	1–1	Tadamon
Al Fahaheel	2–2	Al Shabab
Al Salibikhaet	4–1	Al Kuwait
2010-11-03
Al Jahra	0–1	Al Kuwait
Al Sahel	2–1	Al Shabab
Al Fahaheel	2–2	Al Salibikhaet
2010-11-08
Al Jahra	2–0	Al Fahaheel
Al Sahel	2–0	Al Salibikhaet
Tadamon	2–1	Al Kuwait
2010-11-21
Al Jahra	2–2	Al Sahel
Al Fahaheel	1–2	Tadamon
Al Salibikhaet	2–1	Al Shabab
2010-11-25
Al Jahra	1–1	Al Shabab
Al Sahel	5–2	Tadamon
Al Fahaheel	0–0	Al Kuwait
2010-11-29
Al Jahra	4–0	Al Salibikhaet
Al Sahel	1–1	Al Kuwait
Tadamon	4–1	Al Shabab
2010-12-14
Al Sahel	4–1	Al Fahaheel
Al Shabab	1–2	Al Kuwait
Tadamon	1–0	Al Salibikhaet
2010-12-18
Al Kuwait	3–0	Al Salibikhaet
Al Shabab	2–3	Al Fahaheel
Tadamon	2–0	Al Jahra
2010-12-27
Al Kuwait	1–1	Al Jahra
Al Shabab	4–1	Al Sahel
Al Salibikhaet	1–3	Al Fahaheel
2011-01-02
Al Fahaheel	1–1	Al Jahra
Al Kuwait	3–1	Tadamon
Al Salibikhaet	5–1	Al Sahel

^{1} It is unclear why Al Sahel did not take their place in the semi-final stages after qualifying, although it is not uncommon in Kuwaiti football competitions for teams to withdraw at certain stages of tournaments.

== Semi-finals ==
7 January 2011

Al Kuwait	0 – 0 2 – 4 pens	Al Naser

7 January 2011

Al Qadisiya	4 – 0	Tadamon

== Final ==
The cup was won by Al Qadisiya.

13 January 2011

Al Naser	0 - 2	Al Qadisiya
