= Shehab Kankouni =

Kuwaiti footballer

Personal information
- Full name: Shehab Ahmed Hussain Kankoune (Arabic: شهاب أحمد حسين كنكوني)
- Date of birth: 28 April 1981 (age 45)
- Place of birth: Kuwait City, Kuwait
- Height: 1.88 m (6 ft 2 in)
- Position: Goalkeeper

Youth career
- Kazma Sporting Club

Senior career*
Years	Team	Apps	(Gls)
1997–2012	Kazma Sporting Club		
2008–2010	→ Al Arabi (loan)		
2012–2013	Al-Sulaibikhat SC		
2013–2015	Al-Yarmouk SC		
2015–2017	Kazma Sporting Club		
2017–2018	Al Fahaheel		
2018–2019	Al Tadamon		

International career^{‡}
1998–2010	Kuwait	43	(0)
- * Club domestic league appearances and goals as of 9 April 2019 ‡ National team caps and goals as of 30 November 2010

Shehab Kankouni (Arabic: شهاب كنكوني; born 28 April 1981) is a Kuwaiti footballer who plays for Kazma Sporting Club in the Kuwaiti Premier League. He is a goalkeeper.

Kankouni played for Kuwait at the 2000 Summer Olympics in Sydney.
