= Kuwait Futsal Federation Cup =

Kuwaiti futsal tournament crowns Al-Fahaheel FC

- Founded: 2009; 17 years ago
- Country: Kuwait
- Confederation: AFC
- Number of clubs: 10
- Level on pyramid: 1
- International cup: AFC Futsal Club Championship
- Current champions: Qadsia SC (2018-19)
- Most championships: Al Qadsia SC (6)
- Broadcaster(s): KTV Sport

The Kuwaiti Futsal Federation Cup started in 2009 in which Al-Fahaheel FC won against Al-Salmiya SC to be crowned the first champion along with Al-Yarmouk SC winning the Kuwaiti Futsal League.

== Champions ==
- 2009–10: Al-Fahaheel FC
- 2010–11: Al Qadsia SC
- 2011–12: Al Qadsia SC
- 2012–13: Al-Arabi SC
- 2013–14: Al Qadsia SC
- 2014–15: Al Qadsia SC 3–2 Al-Arabi SC
- 2015–16: Al Qadsia SC 5–2 Al-Arabi SC
- 2016–17: Kazma SC 2–1 Kuwait SC
- 2017–18: Kuwait SC 2–1 Kazma SC
- 2018–19: Al Qadsia SC 5–3 Al-Salmiya SC
- 2019–20: Cancelled due to the COVID-19 pandemic
- 2020–21: Al Qadsia SC 7–3 Al-Salmiya SC
- 2021-22: Kuwait SC 5–4 Al-Arabi SC
- 2022-23:
- 2023-24: Al-Arabi SC 3-1 Kuwait SC
