= Kuwaiti Futsal League =

- Founded: 2009; 17 years ago
- Country: Kuwait
- Confederation: AFC
- Number of clubs: 10
- Level on pyramid: 1
- Domestic cup(s): Kuwaiti Futsal Federation Cup; Kuwaiti Futsal Super Cup
- International cup: AFC Futsal Club Championship
- Current champions: Kuwait SC (6) (2024-25)
- Most championships: Kuwait SC (6)
- Broadcaster(s): KTV Sport

The Kuwaiti Futsal League started in 2009 and was inspired by the Al-Roudan Famous Tournament. The first-ever champion was Al-Yarmouk SC in the 2009–10 season.

== Champions ==
- 2009-10: Al-Yarmouk SC
- 2010-11: Al-Yarmouk SC
- 2011-12: Al-Salmiya SC
- 2012-13: Al Qadsia SC
- 2013-14: Al Qadsia SC
- 2014-15: Kazma SC
- 2015-16: Kazma SC
- 2016-17: Kuwait SC
- 2017-18: Kazma SC
- 2018-19: Kuwait SC
- 2019-20: Cancelled due to the COVID-19 pandemic
- 2020-21: Kuwait SC
- 2021-22: Kuwait SC
- 2022-23: Kuwait SC
- 2023-24: Kuwait SC
- 2024-25: Kazma SC
- 2025-26: Kazma SC
