= Osama Hussain =

Kuwaiti footballer

Personal information
- Full name: Osama Hussain Sultan Abdullah أسامة حسين سلطان عبد الله
- Date of birth: August 11, 1970 (age 56)
- Place of birth: Kuwait
- Height: 1.81 m (5 ft 11 in)
- Positions: Right-back; centre-back

Youth career
- 1984–1986: Al Arabi

Senior career*
Years	Team	Apps	(Gls)
1987–2002	Al Arabi	152	(12)
Total		152	(12)

International career
1990–2001	Kuwait	91	(2)
- * Club domestic league appearances and goals

Osama Hussain (Arabic: أسامة حسين), is a Kuwaiti former professional footballer who played as a right-back and centre-back. Osama finished his career at Al Arabi in 2002.

== Al Arabi ==
He Joined Al Arabi in 1984, first he played in Al Arabi U14. After that when he grow up and reach 16 years he was able to play for Al Arabi first team. He played his first match against Al Kuwait when he was 16, and he scored his first goal against Al Salmiya in 1987.

== National team ==
In 1990 Luiz Felipe Scolari choose him to Kuwait national football team when he was 18. He played in Gulf Cup, AFC Asian Cup, Olympic Games and Asian Games. He competed for Kuwait at the 1992 Summer Olympics in Barcelona.

== Career statistics ==
=== International ===
Appearances and goals by national team and year
National team	Year	Apps	Goals
Kuwait	1990	10	0
Kuwait	1991	–	
Kuwait	1992	5	0
Kuwait	1993	–	
Kuwait	1994	–	
Kuwait	1995	1	0
Kuwait	1996	12	0
Kuwait	1997	11	1
Kuwait	1998	3	0
Kuwait	1999	1	0
Kuwait	2000	9	0
Kuwait	2001	4	0
Total		56	1

Scores and results list Kuwait's goal tally first, score column indicates score after each Hussain goal.

List of international goals scored by Osama Hussain
No.	Date	Venue	Opponent	Score	Result	Competition
1	22 June 1997	Bourj Hammoud Stadium, Beirut, Lebanon	Lebanon	3–1	3–1	1998 FIFA World Cup qualification
