= Boris Bunjak =

Serbian football coach (born 1954)

Personal information
- Date of birth: 17 November 1954 (age 71)
- Position: Midfielder

Senior career*
| Years | Team | Apps | (Gls) |
| 1977–1978 | Radnički Kragujevac | 8 | (0) |
| 1979–1980 | Šumadija Aranđelovac | 23 | (0) |
| 1983–1984 | Borac Čačak | 1 | (0) |

Managerial career
- 1990–1993: Sloga Kraljevo
- 1997–1998: Javor Ivanjica
- 1998–1999: Crvena zvezda Gnjilane
- 1999: Radnički Niš
- 2000: Uralan Elista
- 2000–2002: Mladi Radnik
- 2002–2004: Red Star Belgrade (assistant)
- 2004: Al-Shaab
- 2005: Hajduk Kula
- 2006–2007: Al-Nasr Salalah
- 2009–2010: Al-Orouba
- 2010: Srem
- 2011: Damac
- 2012: Azam
- 2013: Yadanarbon
- 2014–2015: Al-Arabi Kuwait
- 2015–2016: Al-Arabi Kuwait
- 2017–2018: Al-Jahra
- 2017–2018: Kuwait (interim)
- 2018: Nejmeh
- 2019–2020: Kazma
- 2020-2021: Sloga Kraljevo
- 2022: Al Urooba
- 2022–2023: Qadsia
- Kuwait SC
- * Club domestic league appearances and goals

Boris Bunjak (Serbian Cyrillic: Борис Буњак; born 17 November 1954) is a Serbian football coach and a former player.

== Playing career ==
Bunjak started his career in Sloga Kraljevo. He played with FK Radnički Kragujevac, FK Šumadija Aranđelovac, and FK Borac Čačak in the Yugoslav Second League.

== Managerial career ==
Bunjak started in 1990 at Sloga and continued at Javor, Radnički Niš, Uralan, Red Star Belgrade. In 2006, he started working in Al Nasr Salalah, and next club is Al Oruba Sur. On 11 July 2011, Bunjak was appointed manager of Saudi club Damac. He was sacked on 8 October 2011. On 8 August 2012, Tanzanian Premier League club Azam appointed Bunjak head coach on a two-year deal. After two months in charge of the club, he was fired for producing poor results.

On 8 December 2012, Myanmar National League club Yadanarbon appointed Bunjak head coach.

On 15 December 2014, he won the Kuwait Crown Prince Cup with Al-Arabi SC.

In October 2015, Bunjak returned to his home club Sloga Kraljevo, together with his assistant Petar Đekić.

In August 2018, Lebanese Premier League club Nejmeh SC appointed Bunjak head coach.

In July 2019, Kuwait Premier League side Kazma SC appointed Bunjak head coach.
