= Abdulaziz Al-Buloushi =

Kuwaiti footballer

Personal information
- Full name: Abdulaziz Hasan Al-Buloushi
- Date of birth: 4 December 1962 (age 63)
- Place of birth: Kuwait
- Position: Midfielder

Senior career*
Years	Team	Apps	(Gls)
1980–1992	Qadsia SC		

International career
1982–1992	Kuwait		
- * Club domestic league appearances and goals

Abdulaziz Hasan Al-Buloushi (Arabic: عَبْد الْعَزِيز حَسَن الْبَلُوشِيّ; born 4 December 1962) is a Kuwaiti football forward who played for Kuwait in the 1982 FIFA World Cup. He also played for Qadsia SC.
