= 5th GCC Club Championship =

1987 GCC Club Championship
Tournament details
- Dates: 1–10 March 1987
- Teams: 6 (from AFC/UAFA confederations)

Final positions
- Champions: (Kuwait) Kazma (1st title)
- Runners-up: (Saudi Arabia) Al-Hilal

The 5th GCC Club Championship (Arabic: بطولة الأنديـة الخليجية أبطال الدوري) was the fifth edition of the GCC Club Championship for clubs of the Gulf Cooperation Council nations, held in 1987.

The tournament doubled up as the qualifying round of the 1987–88 Asian Club Championship. The winners and runners up would progress to the ACC's latter stages.

== Results ==
Pos	Team	Pld	W	D	L	GF	GA	GD	Pts	Qualification
1	(Kuwait) Kazma SC (H)	4	3	0	1	6	1	+5	6	Advance to 1987 Asian Club Championship
2	(Saudi Arabia) Al-Hilal	4	2	1	1	6	3	+3	5	Advance to 1987 Asian Club Championship
3	(Bahrain) Muharraq	4	2	0	2	5	7	−2	4	
4	(United Arab Emirates) Al-Nasr	4	1	1	2	3	4	−1	3	
5	(Oman) Fanja	4	1	0	3	4	9	−5	2	

Source: RSSSF
(H) Hosts

All matches were played in Kuwait.

Match 1	Kazma SC	0–1	Al-Hilal
Match 2	Muharraq Club	0–1	Al-Nasr
Match 3	Kazma SC	3–0	Muharraq Club
Match 4	Al-Hilal	0–0	Al-Nasr
Match 5	Al-Hilal	3-0	Fanja
Match 6	Kazma SC	1–0	Al-Nasr
Match 7	Muharraq Club	2-1	Fanja
Match 8	Kazma SC	2-0	Fanja
Match 9	Al-Hilal	2–3	Muharraq Club
Match 10	Al-Nasr	2-3	Fanja

== Winner ==
GCC Club Championship
1987 Winners

Kazma SC
1st Title
