= Kuwait Joint League =

- Founded: 1969
- Folded: 1989
- Country: Kuwait
- Confederation: AFC
- Number of clubs: 14
- Level on pyramid: 1
- Domestic cup(s): Kuwait Emir Cup; Kuwait Crown Prince Cup; Kuwait Federation Cup; Kuwait Super Cup
- International cup(s): AFC Cup; AFC Champions League; GCC Champions League; UAFA Cup
- Last champions: Kuwait SC (2nd Title) (1988–89)
- Most championships: Al Arabi SC (5)
- Broadcaster(s): KTV Sport; Al-Watan; Al-Kass

The Kuwaiti Joint League was a League tournament where all the kuwaiti clubs competed in. It was defunct in 1988-89 with Kuwait SC as the final champion.

== Champions ==
- 1969–70: Al Arabi SC
- 1970–71: Al Arabi SC
- 1971–72: Al Arabi SC
- 1972–73: Al-Yarmouk SC
- 1973–74: Al-Yarmouk SC
- 1976–77: Kuwait SC
- 1984–85: Al Arabi SC
- 1987–88: Al Arabi SC
- 1988–89: Kuwait SC
