= 20th GCC Club Championship =

2003 GCC Club Championship
Tournament details
- Host country: Kuwait
- Dates: 27 January – 7 February 2003
- Teams: 5 (from AFC/UAFA confederations)

Final positions
- Champions: (Kuwait) Al-Arabi (2nd title)
- Runners-up: (Bahrain) Al-Muharraq

The 20th GCC Club Championship (Arabic: بطولة الأنديـة الخليجية أبطال الدوري) was the twentieth edition of the GCC Club Championship for clubs of the Gulf Cooperation Council nations.

The 2003 edition was won by the Kuwaiti soccer team Al Arabi Kuwait.

== Results ==
Team	Pts	Pld	W	D	L	GF	GA	GD
Al Arabi Kuwait	8	4	2	2	0	4	2	+2
(Bahrain) Al-Muharraq	7	4	2	1	1	5	3	+2
(Saudi Arabia) Al-Hilal	7	4	2	1	1	5	3	+2
(Oman) Al-Oruba	4	4	1	1	2	3	4	−1
Qatar SC	1	4	0	1	3	1	7	−6

All match were played in Kuwait.

Jan 27, 2003	Al Hilal	2–0	Qatar SC
Jan 28, 2003	Muharraq	1–2	Al Arabi
Jan 29, 2003	Al Oruba	1–2	Al Hilal
Jan 30, 2003	Qatar SC	0–2	Muharraq
Feb 1, 2003	Al Arabi	0–0	Al Oruba
Feb 2, 2003	Al Hilal	1–1	Muharraq
Feb 3, 2003	Qatar SC	1–1	Al Arabi
Feb 5, 2003	Muharraq	1–0	Al Oruba
Feb 6, 2003	Al Hilal	0–1	Al Arabi
Feb 7, 2003	Qatar SC	0–2	Al Oruba

Al-Muharraq came second on the toss of a coin

== Winner ==
GCC Club Championship
2003 Winners

Al Arabi Kuwait
2nd Title
