= Al-Khurafi Cup =

- Founded: 1999; 27 years ago
- Abolished: 2007
- Region: Kuwait
- Teams: 14
- Last champions: Kazma SC
- Most championships: Al-Arabi SC (3 titles)

The Al Kurafi Cup (Arabic: كأس الخرافي) was a Kuwaiti football competition. The competition ran from 1999 to 2007. It was named after M. A. Kharafi & Sons.

== Previous winners ==
- 1998–99 : Al Arabi Kuwait
- 1999–2000 : Al Salmiya Club
- 2000–01 : Al Arabi Kuwait
- 2001–02 : Al Arabi Kuwait
- 2002–03 : Al Qadisiya Kuwait 0–0 Al Kazma Kuwait (aet, 6–5 pen)
- 2003–04 : Al Kazma Kuwait 1–0 Al Arabi Kuwait
- 2004–05 : Al Kuwait Kaifan 1–1 Al Qadisiya Kuwait (aet, 5–3 pen)
- 2005–06 : Al Qadisiya Kuwait 2–1 Al Arabi Kuwait
- 2006–07 : Al Kazma Kuwait 1–0 Al Kuwait Kaifan

=== Performance By Club ===
Club	Winners
Al Arabi Kuwait	3
Al Qadisiya Kuwait	2
Al Kazma Kuwait	2
Al Kuwait Kaifan	1
Al Salmiya Club	1
