= Kuwait Federation Cup =

- Founded: 1969; 57 years ago
- Region: Kuwait
- Teams: 15
- Current champions: Qadsia (6th title)
- Most championships: Al-Arabi SC (8 titles)

The Kuwaiti Federation Cup (Arabic: كأس الاتحاد الكويتي) was a competition organised by the Kuwait Football Association.

The first edition of the Federation Cup was played in the 1969–70 season, although not much is known about the competition in the early years. The competition is for senior teams playing in the top tier Kuwait Premier League, although the 2015–16 edition saw the second-division Burgan enter.

The cup competition is predominantly played during international breaks (group stage) and after league match days. the tournament was abolished at the end of 2015–16 season, but returned in 2017–18.

== Previous winners ==
- 1969–70: Al-Arabi SC
- 1970–73: Cancelled
- 1973–74: Al-Fahaheel
- 1974–75: Khaitan SC
- 1975–77: Cancelled
- 1977–78: Kuwait SC
- 1978–79: Al-Arabi SC
- 1979–91: Cancelled
- 1991–92: Kuwait SC
- 1992–95: Cancelled
- 1995–96: Al-Arabi SC
- 1996–97: Al-Arabi SC
- 1997–98: Cancelled
- 1998–99: Al-Arabi SC
- 1999–00: Al-Arabi SC
- 2000–01: Al-Arabi SC
- 2001–02: Cancelled
- 2002–03: Al-Yarmouk SC
- 2003–07: Cancelled

=== Return of tournament ===
Year	Winners	Score	Runners-up	Venue
2007–08	Al Qadsia	1–1 (4–3 penalties)	Al Kuwait	
2008–09	Al Qadsia	1–0	Kazma	
2009–10	Al Kuwait	0–0 (7–6 penalties)	Al Arabi	Mohammed Al-Hamad Stadium
2010–11	Al Qadsia	2–0	Al Naser	Mohammed Al-Hamad Stadium
2011–12	Al Kuwait	4–3	Kazma	Sabah Al-Salem Stadium
2012–13	Al Qadsia	Group Format		
2013–14	Al-Arabi	2–2 (4–2 penalties)	Al-Salmiya	Mohammed Al-Hamad Stadium
2014–15	Al Kuwait	1–0	Khaitan	Ali Sabah Al-Salem Stadium
2015–16	Kazma	2–1	Al Kuwait	Al-Sadaqua Walsalam Stadium
2016–17	Cancelled			
2017–18	Kazma SC	3–3 (4–2 on penalties)	Al-Shabab SC	Mishref Stadium
2018–19	Qadsia SC	1–1 (6–5 on penalties)	Al-Shabab SC	Mishref Stadium
2019–20	Cancelled due to COVID-19			
2021–22	Al-Nasr SC	1–1 (5–4 on penalties)	Al-Arabi SC	Mishref Stadium
2022–23	Qadsia SC	2-2 (4-3 on penalties)	Al-Salmiya	Al-Sadaqua Walsalam Stadium

== Performance by clubs ==
Club	Winners	Year(s) won
Al-Arabi SC	8	1969–70, 1978–79, 1995–96, 1996–97, 1998–99, 1999–2000, 2001–02, 2013–14
Qadsia SC	6	2007–08, 2008–09, 2010–11, 2012–13, 2018–19, 2022–23
Kuwait SC	5	1977–78, 1991–92, 2009–10, 2011–12, 2014–15
Kazma SC	2	2015–16, 2017–18
Al Yarmouk SC	1	2002–03
Al Fahaheel	1	1973–74
Khaitan SC	1	1974–75
Al-Nasr SC	1	2021–22

== See also ==
- Kuwait Premier League
- Kuwait Emir Cup
- Kuwait Crown Prince Cup
- Kuwait Super Cup
