= Kuwait Futsal Super Cup =

- Founded: 2010; 16 years ago
- Country: Kuwait
- Confederation: AFC
- Number of clubs: 2
- Level on pyramid: 1
- Current champions: Kuwait SC (4th title) (2024)
- Most championships: Kuwait SC (4); Kazma SC (4)
- Broadcaster(s): KTV Sport

The Kuwaiti Futsal super cup started in 2010 after the first season of futsal football finished.

== Champions ==
- 2010: Al–Yarmouk SC
- 2011: Al–Yarmouk SC
- 2012: Qadsia SC
- 2013: Qadsia SC
- 2014: Al–Yarmouk SC
- 2015: Kazma SC
- 2016: Qadsia SC 7–3 Kazma SC
- 2017: Kazma SC 5–3 Kuwait SC
- 2018: Kazma SC 4–3 Kuwait SC
- 2019: Kuwait SC 2–1 Qadsia SC
- 2020: No edition
- 2021: Kuwait SC 4–3 Qadsia SC
- 2022: Kuwait SC 2–0 Kazma SC
- 2023: Kazma SC 4–3 Kuwait SC
- 2024: Kuwait SC 5–5 (7–6 pen) Kazma SC
