= Qadsia SC =

Association football club in Kuwait

Al Qadsia SC
- Full name: Al-Qadsia Sporting Club
- Nicknames: The Royal Club (Arabic: الملكي); Bani Qadis (Arabic: بني قادس); The Yellow Castle (Arabic: القلعة الصفراء)
- Short name: Qadsia
- Founded: 1953; 73 years ago (as Al-Jazira); 20 October 1960; 66 years ago (as Qadsia)
- Ground: Mohammed Al-Hamad Stadium; Hawalli
- Capacity: 22,000
- Chairman: Khaled Fahad Al Sabah
- Manager: Mohammed Ebrahim Hajeyah
- League: Kuwait Premier League
- 2025–26: Kuwait Premier League, 3rd of 10
- Website: qadsia.com
| Home colours | Away colours |

Al Qadsia Sporting Club (Arabic: نادي القادسية الرياضي) is a professional football club based in Kuwait City. Al Qadsia was founded in 1953 as Al-Jazira, before being renamed to Al Qadsia SC on 20 October 1960. Qadsia currently plays in the Kuwait Premier League and has won the league 17 times. Qadsia plays in the Mohammed Al-Hamad Stadium, which is in Hawalli, and is the third largest stadium in Kuwait.

== History ==
Al Qadsia was one of the first Kuwaiti teams to be established, alongside Al-Arabi and Kuwait SC. They started playing in 1961–62 and finished second for three consecutive seasons, behind Al-Arabi, who started the Kuwaiti El Clásico between them. Their first league title came in 1968–69.

=== 1960s ===
The 1961/62 season was the first official for Kuwaiti football. Qadsia was second in the league and Prince Cup, under the leadership of coach Mohammed Al-Hamad. The team won Kuwaiti league title in 1963–64. The team lost in the Prince Cup 1963–64 final against Al-Arabi by 2–0. In 1964–65 Egyptian coach Omar Khairy was appointed, and the team won second place. On 8 January 1965, Qadsia won in the 1964–65 Prince Cup final. In the season 1965–66 coach Aladdin Niazi and won second place in the league for fifth consecutive time, this time behind the Al-Arabi, and team went out against Salmiya in the quarterfinals of Prince Cup. In the season of 1966–67, under the leadership of coach Jean Cristo, the club won Prince Cup 1966–67 for the second time, after beating Al-Arabi by 4–2. In 1967, the team won fourth place in the Kuwaiti league, and on 12 January 1968 Al-Qadisiya defeated Al-Arabi by 2–1 in the Prince Cup final. In 1968–69 Qadsia won the Kuwait league title for the first time in its history. In the 1969–70 season club won third league place and emerged from the quarter-finals of Prince Cup by Yarmouk, which won the title later.

=== 1970s ===
In the 1970–71 season under the leadership of coach Ron Lewin, Al Qadsia won league title 1970–71 for the second time. The team went out of the cup quarter-final against Al-Arabi in the penalty shootout. In 1971–72 season, team emerged from the semi-finals of the 1971–72 league playoffs. However, Qadsia won the Prince's Cup for the first time in their history. In the 1972–73 season, the team finished fourth in Group A with 6 points and emerged from the league competition. In 1972–73, the team emerged from the cup quarter-finals after losing to Al Arabi. The team won third place in the Kuwaiti league 1973–74. In Prince Cup, Qadsia defeated Kuwait SC. In the 1974–75 season, the tournament was not organized, but Federation Cup was established and Qadsia came in third place. The team won Kuwaiti league 1974–75 for the fifth time in its history, and in the Prince Cup, Qadsia defeated Kuwait Club by 2–0, scored by Faisal Al-Dakhil. Qadsia won the next league title in 1975–76 without losing any match, and in the Prince Cup they lost to Kuwait SC. The 1976–77 league championship returned again and the team won second place behind Kuwait SC, after losing 5–3 in the final. As coach Ron Lewin returned and the team won the third place in the league, and in the Prince Cup 1978–79, the club managed to win the title after defeating Kazma.

=== 1980s ===
In the 1980–81 season they finished third in the league, and in the Prince Cup they lost the quarter-finals to Kuwait Club. In 1982–83, Al Qadsia was in sixth league place and third place in the Prince Cup. In the 1983–84 season, coach Milan Milanić was appointed. In the first season the team settled in fifth league place, and in Prince Cup reached quarter-finals. In the 1984–85 season, Muayad Al-Haddad moved to Qadsia from Kheitan Club. The team was in fifth place, and in the Prince's Cup was fourth place. In 1985–86 season, coach Bob Campbell was appointed. The team finished second in league behind Kazma, and in Prince Cup they finished third. In 1986–87 season, Kuwaiti coach Saleh Zakaria was appointed, the team finished fourth in the league and in Prince Cup the team emerged from the quarter-finals after losing to Al-Nasr in penalties. In 1987, Luiz Felipe Scolari was coach of the team, and the team settled in seventh place in the Kuwaiti league, which is the worst ever position of the club. In the Prince Cup the team went out in the preliminary round after losing against Al-Jahra in a penalty shootout. In 1988–89 season, the team finished fourth in the Kuwaiti league. In the Prince Cup, they won title for the first time since 1978–79. Qadsia won the final against Al-Arabi Club 2–0. In the Prince Cup 1989–90, the team got third place. They also participated in the Silver Jubilee Championship, together with Al Arabi Club, Al Salmiya Club, Al Muharraq Club, Al Zawraa Club, and Zamalek SC. Qadsia and Zamalek qualified for the final, Qadsia won 1–0.

=== 1990s ===
In the 1990s, period that followed Iraqi invasion of Kuwait, team appointed the Brazilian coach Fola in the 1991–92 season. Al Qadsia won first place in the league, for the seventh time. In the 1992–93 season, after Brazilian coach Scolari returned, they came second in the Kuwaiti Confederation Cup, losing in the final against Kuwait Club, and won second place in the Kuwaiti league behind Al Arabi Club. In 1993 club won new championship, the Crown Prince Cup, and got second place in the league behind Kazma. In the Prince Cup 1993–94 Qadsia won the championship title after beating Al-Tadamon Club 2–1. The club did not compete in the Crown. In the 1995/96 season, coach Idanaldo Patricio took charge of the club. Qadsia won third league place. In the Prince Cup 1996/97 Qadsia won second place, after losing to Kazma 2–0. In the 1997/98 season Jorvan Vieira was appointed as coach. Qadsia came out in the quarter-final against Kazma, who won the title later. In the season of 1998/1999, Qadsia won league title for eighth time in its history, after winning the final game against Al-Tadamon Club. In Prince's Cup Qadsia went out of the quarter-finals against Al-Sahel. In 1999/2000 season Mohamed Ibrahim took over the club, and the team won second league place. In the Prince Cup, Qadsia was fourth. In Gulf Clubs Cup, Qadsia won the championship for the first time in the club's history.

=== 2010s and 2020s ===
Al Qadsia has been to the final of the AFC Cup twice (2010 and 2013), but lost both, first to Al-Ittihad Aleppo and second to Kuwait SC. Al Qadsia won the 2014 AFC Cup for the first time, in their third final appearance. Qadsia is first club in Kuwait to win four trophies in a year, in the 2013–14 season (Kuwait Super Cup, Kuwait Crown Prince Cup, Kuwait Premier League, and AFC Cup). The second half of the decade witnessed a decline in Al-Qadsia's performance and an unusual absence from winning titles. During the following ten years (2014–2024), the club secured only one league title and two Emir Cup titles.

== Honours ==
| Type | Competition | Title(s) | Seasons |
|---|---|---|---|
| Domestic | Kuwait Premier League | 17 | 1968–69, 1970–71, 1972–73, 1974–75, 1975–76, 1977–78, 1991–92, 1998–99, 2002–03, 2003–04, 2004–05, 2008–09, 2009–10, 2010–11, 2011–12, 2013–14, 2015–16 |
| Domestic | Kuwait Emir Cup | 17 | 1964–65, 1966–67, 1967–68, 1971–72, 1973–74, 1974–75, 1978–79, 1988–89, 1993–94, 2002–03, 2003–04, 2006–07, 2009–10, 2011–12, 2012–13, 2014–15, 2023–24 |
| Domestic | Kuwait Crown Prince Cup | 9 | 1998, 2002, 2004, 2005, 2006, 2009, 2012–13, 2013–14, 2017–18 |
| Domestic | Kuwait Super Cup | 7 | 2009, 2011, 2013, 2014, 2018, 2019, 2025–26 |
| Domestic | Kuwait Federation Cup (Defunct) | 6 | 2007–08, 2008–09, 2010–11, 2012–13, 2018–19, 2022–23 |
| Domestic | Al-Khurafi Cup (Defunct) | 2 | 2002–03, 2005–06 |
| Continent | AFC Cup | 1 | 2014 |
| Continent | GCC Champions League | 2 | 2000, 2005 |

- record
- ^{S} shared record

== Futsal ==
- Kuwaiti Futsal League: 2

2012–13, 2013–14

- Kuwait Futsal Federation Cup: 5

2010–11, 2011–12, 2013–14, 2014–15, 2015–16

- Kuwait Futsal Super Cup: 3

2013, 2014, 2016

== Current squad ==
As of 20 September 2026

Note: Flags indicate national team as defined under FIFA eligibility rules; some limited exceptions apply. Players may hold more than one non-FIFA nationality.

| No. | Pos. | Nation | Player |
|---|---|---|---|
| 33 | GK | KUW | Hameed Al-Qallaf |
| 23 | GK | KUW | Saud Al-Jenaie |
| 27 | GK | KUW | Mohammed Al-Kandari |
| 36 | DF | KUW | Khalid El Ebrahim |
| 2 | DF | KUW | Ahmad Al-Yahya |
| 3 | DF | KUW | Moaath Al‑Dhafiri |
| 4 | DF | KUW | Rashed Al-Dousary |
| 6 | DF | KUW | Khaled Al‑Fadhli |
| 25 | DF | KUW | Sultan Al-Faraj |
| 5 | MF | KUW | Faisel Al Shatti |
| 8 | MF | EGY | Abdullah Motawea |
| 14 | DF | KUW | Abdulaziz Wadi |
| 18 | MF | KUW | Athbi Shehab |
| 19 | FW | KUW | Ahmad Boodai |
| 23 | MF | CIV | Cedrik Gbo |

| No. | Pos. | Nation | Player |
|---|---|---|---|
| 24 | MF | KUW | Mohammed Al-Omran |
| 25 | DF | KUW | Yousef Al‑Haqan |
| 27 | MF | KUW | Abdullah Qhunaiman |
| 28 | MF | KUW | Jasim Al-Mutar |
| 31 | MF | KUW | Talal AlFadhel |
| 15 | FW | KUW | Abdullah Al-Awadhi |
| 17 | FW | KUW | Bader Al-Mutawa (captain) |
| 22 | FW | MAR | Ayoub Lakhdar |
| 30 | FW | KUW | Turki Al-Yousef |
| 24 | FW | KUW | Khaled Al-Kharqawi |
| 26 | FW | KUW | Meqdad Ali Safar |
| 20 | FW | OMA | Abdulrahman Al-Mushaifri |
| 21 | FW | MAR | Hamza Khabba |
| 27 | FW | OMA | Nasser Al-Rawahi |
| 26 | FW | KUW | Fadhel Al-Sarraf |

== Performance in AFC competitions ==
- AFC Champions League: 4 appearances

2006: Semi-finals
2008: Quarter-finals
2014: 3rd round qualifying
2015: 3rd round qualifying

- AFC Cup: 8 appearances

2010: Runners-up
2011: Round of 16
2012: Round of 16
2013: Runners-up
2014: Winner
2015: Semifinal
2019: Group stage
2020: Cancelled

- Asian Club Championship: 1 appearance

2000: First round (withdrew)

- Asian Cup Winners Cup: 1 appearances

1994–95: Second round (withdrew)

| Season | Competition | Round | | Club | Home | Away |
|---|---|---|---|---|---|---|
| 1991 | Asian Cup Winners Cup | 1st round | (Jordan) | Al Faisaly | - | - |
| 1995 | Asian Cup Winners Cup | 1st round | (Oman) | Al Oruba Sur | 2–0 | 0–1 |
| | | 2nd round | (Qatar) | Al Sadd | - | 0–2 |
| 2000 | Asian Club Championship | 1st round | (Yemen) | Al-Wahda | - | - |
| 2006 | AFC Champions League | Group stage | (Iran) | Foolad | 2–0 | 0–6 |
| | | Group stage | (Uzbekistan) | Pakhtakor | 2–1 | 2–2 |
| | | Group stage | (Syria) | Al Ittihad | 1–0 | 2–2 |
| | | Quarterfinal | (United Arab Emirates) | Al Ain | 2–2 | 3–0 |
| | | Semifinal | (Syria) | Al-Karamah | 0–1 | 0–0 |
| 2008 | AFC Champions League | Group stage | (Uzbekistan) | Pakhtakor | 2–2 | 1–0 |
| | | Group stage | (Iraq) | Arbil | 1–1 | 2–4 |
| | | Group stage | (Qatar) | Al-Gharafa | 1–0 | 1–0 |
| | | Quarterfinal | (Japan) | Urawa | 3–2 | 0–2 |
| 2010 | AFC Cup | Group stage | (India) | East Bengal | 4–1 | 3–2 |
| | | Group stage | (Syria) | Al Ittihad | 3–0 | 0–0 |
| | | Group stage | (Lebanon) | Al Nejmeh | 1–1 | 3–1 |
| | | Round of 16 | (India) | Churchill Brothers | 2–1 | |
| | | Quarterfinal | (Thailand) | Thai Port | 3–0 | 0–0 |
| | | Semifinal | (Bahrain) | Riffa | 4–1 | 0–2 |
| | | Final | (Syria) | Al-Ittihad | 1–1 (a.e.t.); 2–4 (p) | |
| 2011 | AFC Cup | Group stage | (Uzbekistan) | Shurtan | 4–0 | 1–1 |
| | | Group stage | (Syria) | Al-Ittihad | 3–2 | 2–0 |
| | | Group stage | (Yemen) | Al-Saqr | 3–0 | 2–2 |
| | | Round of 16 | (Kuwait) | Al-Kuwait | 2–2 (a.e.t.); 2–3 (p) | |
| 2012 | AFC Cup | Group stage | (Oman) | Al-Suwaiq | 2–0 | 5–1 |
| | | Group stage | (Syria) | Al-Ittihad | 5–2 | 0–1 |
| | | Group stage | (Jordan) | Al-Faisaly | 1–2 | 1–1 |
| | | Round of 16 | (Kuwait) | Al-Kuwait | 1–1 (a.e.t.); 1–3 (p) | |
| 2013 | AFC Cup | Group stage | (Syria) | Al-Shorta | 0–1 | 2–0 |
| | | Group stage | (Jordan) | Al-Ramtha | 2–2 | 3–0 |
| | | Group stage | (Tajikistan) | Ravshan | 3–0 | 3–1 |
| | | Round of 16 | (Oman) | Fanja | 4–0 | |
| | | Quarterfinal | (Syria) | Al-Shorta | 0–0 | 2–2 |
| | | Semifinal | (Jordan) | Al-Faisaly | 2–1 | 1–0 |
| | | Final | (Kuwait) | Al-Kuwait | 0–2 | |
| 2014 | AFC Champions League | 1st round | (Oman) | Al-Suwaiq | 1–0 | |
| | | 2nd round | (United Arab Emirates) | Bani Yas | 4–0 | |
| | | 3rd round | (Qatar) | El Jaish | 0–3 | |
| | AFC Cup | Group stage | (Iraq) | Al Shorta SC | 3–0 | 0–0 |
| | | Group stage | (Bahrain) | Al-Hidd | 2–0 | 2–3 |
| | | Group stage | (Syria) | Al-Wahda | 1–1 | 3–1 |
| | | Round of 16 | (Jordan) | That Ras | 4–0 | |
| | | Quarterfinal | (Bahrain) | Al-Hidd | 1–1 | 2–2 |
| | | Semifinal | (Indonesia) | Persipura Jayapura | 4–2 | 6–0 |
| | | Final | (Iraq) | Arbil | 0–0 (a.e.t.); 4–2 (p) | |
| 2015 | AFC Champions League | Playoff 2 | (Jordan) | Al-Wehdat SC | 1–0 | |
| | | Playoff 3 | (Saudi Arabia) | Al-Ahli | 1–2 | |
| | AFC Cup | Group stage | (Turkmenistan) | FC Ahal | 2–0 | 1–0 |
| | | Group stage | (Tajikistan) | FC Istiklol | 2–2 | 0–2 |
| | | Group stage | (Iraq) | Arbil | 1–2 | 1–0 |
| | | Round of 16 | (Jordan) | Al-Wehdat SC | 1–0 | |
| | | Quarterfinal | (Syria) | Al-Jaish | 3–0 | 0–2 |
| | | Semifinal | (Malaysia) | Johor Darul Ta'zim F.C. | 3–1 | w/o |
| 2019 | AFC Cup | Group stage | (Oman) | Suwaiq Club | 2–0 | 1–2 |
| | | Group stage | (Bahrain) | Malkiya Club | 1–2 | 2–1 |
| | | Group stage | (Lebanon) | Al-Ahed SC | 0–1 | 0–0 |
| 2020 | AFC Cup | Group stage | (Oman) | Dhofar Club | | |
| | | Group stage | (Bahrain) | Riffa SC | | 2–1 |
| | | Group stage | (Jordan) | Al-Jazeera | | |

== Presidents and managers ==
=== Presidential history ===
Qadsia has had numerous presidents over the course of their history.

| Name | Years |
|---|---|
| Suliman Al-Khaled | 1960–1961 |
| Faisel Al-Mutawa | 1961–1962 |
| Rashed Al-Rashed | 1962–1963 |
| Khaled Al-Masaod | 1963–1965 |
| Khaled Al-Hamed | 1965–1966 |
| Mohammed Al-Hamed | 1966–1967 |
| Khaled Al-Masaod | 1967–1968 |
| Khaled Al-Hamad | 1968–1970 |
| Fahad Al-Ahmed Al-Sabah | 1970–1979 |
| Khaled Al-Hamad | 1979–1985 |
| Yousef Al-Mushari | 1985–1987 |
| Abdulaziz Al-Mokhled | 1989 |
| Abdulmohsen Al-Faris | 1989–1997 |
| Talal Al-Fahad Al-Subah | 1997–2010 |
| Major General Dr. Mahmoud Ghadban Al-Razouki | 2010 |
| Fawaz Al-Hasawi | 2010–2012 |
| Khaled Al-Fahad Al-Sabah | 2012– |

=== Managerial history ===
Below is a list of Qadsia coaches from 1960 until the present day.

| Name | Nationality | Years |
|---|---|---|
| Mohammed Al Hamed | (Kuwait) | 1960–1962 |
| Abdulmhsen Al Faris | (Kuwait) | 1962–1963 |
| Omar Shendi | (Egypt) | 1963–1965 |
| Aladdin Niazi | (Syria) | 1965–1966 |
| Jan Cestić | (Socialist Federal Republic of Yugoslavia) | 1966–1967 |
| Vojin Božović | (Socialist Federal Republic of Yugoslavia) | 1967–1970 |
| Ron Lewin | (England) | 1970–1972 |
| Žarko Mihajlović | (Socialist Federal Republic of Yugoslavia) | 1972–1975 |
| Peter McBride | (Scotland) | 1975–1977 |
| Mohammed Al Masaod | (Kuwait) | 1976–1977 |
| Tomason | (Denmark) | 1977 |
| Žarko Mihajlović | (Socialist Federal Republic of Yugoslavia) | 1977–1978 |
| Ron Lewin | (England) | 1978–1979 |
| Abdullah Al Asfor | (Kuwait) | 1979–1980 |
| Bonero | (Spain) | 1980–1983 |
| Miljan Miljanić | (Socialist Federal Republic of Yugoslavia) | 1983–1985 |
| Bobby Campbell | (England) | 1985–1986 |
| Saleh Zakaria | (Kuwait) | 1986–1987 |
| Luiz Felipe Scolari | (Brazil) | 1987–1990 |
| Vola | (Italy) | 1990–1992 |
| Luiz Felipe Scolari | (Brazil) | 1992–1993 |
| Alexandru Moldovan | (Romania) | 1993 |
| Dragan Gugleta | (Socialist Federal Republic of Yugoslavia) | 1993–1995 |
| Mohammed Al Zaer | (Kuwait) | 1995 |
| Ednaldo Patricio | (Brazil) | 1995–1997 |
| René Feller | (Netherlands) | 1997–1998 |
| Jorvan Vieira | (Brazil) | 1997–1999 |
| Mohammed Ebrahim | (Kuwait) | 1999–2000 |
| Fakro Al Deen | (Bosnia and Herzegovina) | 2000 |
| Senad Kreso | (Bosnia and Herzegovina) | 2000–2001 |
| Branko Totak | (Croatia) | 2001 |
| Radojko Avramović | (Serbia) | 2001 |
| Willem Leushuis | (Netherlands) | 2001–2002 |
| Mohammed Ebrahim | (Kuwait) | 2002–2004 |
| Duílio | (Brazil) | 2004–2005 |
| Mohammed Ebrahim | (Kuwait) | 2005–2007 |
| José Garrido | (Portugal) | 2007–2008 |
| Mohammed Ebrahim | (Kuwait) | 2008–2011 |
| Rodion Gačanin | (Croatia) | 2011–2012 |
| Mohammed Ebrahim | (Kuwait) | 2012–2014 |
| Antonio Puche | (Spain) | 2014–2015 |
| Rashed Al Bediah | (Kuwait) | 2015 |
| Dalibor Starčević | (Croatia) | 2015–2018 |
| Yousef AlMusaibeeh | (Kuwait) | 2018 |
| Marin Ion | (Romania) | 2018–2019 |
| Pablo Franco | (Spain) | 2019–2021 |
| Kheïreddine Madoui | (Algeria) | 2021–2022 |
| Nasser Al-Shatti | (Kuwait) | 2022 |
| Boris Bunjak | (Serbia) | 2022–2023 |
| Mohammed Ebrahim | (Kuwait) | 2023–2024 |
| Mohammed Mashaan | (Kuwait) | 2024 |
| Željko Petrović | (Montenegro) | 2024–2024 |
| Nabil Maâloul | (Tunisia) | 2025–2026 |
| Mohammed Ebrahim | (Kuwait) | 2026– |

== See also ==
- List of football clubs in Kuwait

| Preceded by Al-Arabi | GCC Champions League; 2005 | Succeeded by Al-Ittifaq |
| Preceded by Al-Ittihad | GCC Champions League; 2000 | Succeeded by Al-Ain |
