= Khaitan =

Khaitan خيطان
- City
- Location within Kuwait
- Coordinates: 29°18′N 47°58′E
- Country: Kuwait
- Governorate: Farwaniya Governorate

Area
  - Total: 7.03 km^{2} (2.71 sq mi)

Population (June 2024)
  - Total: 191,415
  - Density: 27,200/km^{2} (70,500/sq mi)

Khaitan (Arabic: خيطان) is an area of Farwaniya Governorate, Kuwait near Kuwait City. It is the home of Khaitan Sporting Club.

== History ==
Khaitan was initially an agricultural village inhabited by farmers. The area of Khaitan was established in 1948 when the Kuwaiti government built homes for its people in that area and distributed lands there. In the beginning, it was a purely residential area.

== Divisions ==
The area is divided into 10 blocks and block No. 3 was known as the villas. This block is now one of the most inhabited blocks by Kuwaitis, and block 10 is known as the installation houses because it is built by the method of installation. Block 2 is known to have a large number of expatriates, especially from Egypt.

== 1999 plate incident ==
In 1999, a fight took place between members of the Egyptian community and others from the Bengal community, and this incident led to riots, violence, and murder, where two people were killed, 120 people were injured, and 13 were arrested. Kuwaiti security forces also intervened to stop the riots, in which they used rubber munitions and tear gas grenades. It is called the Dish Battle because the cause of the quarrel was purportedly a broken saucer.
