= Al-Arabi SC (Kuwait) =

Kuwaiti multi-sports club

- Full name: Al-Arabi Sporting Club
- Nicknames: Al-Za'eem (The Boss); El-Akhthar (The Green); The Castle Of Trophies
- Founded: 1953; 73 years ago (as Al-Uruba); October 20, 1960; 66 years ago (as Al-Arabi)
- Ground: Sabah Al Salem Stadium; Al Kuwait Sports Club Stadium (selected matches); Jaber Al-Mubarak Al-Hamad Stadium (selected matches)
- Capacity: 26,000; 12,350; 15,000
- President: Abdulaziz Ashour
- Manager: Marco Alves
- League: Kuwait Premier League
- 2025–26: Kuwait Premier League, 2nd of 10
Home colours	Away colours

Al-Arabi Sporting Club (Arabic: النادي العربي الرياضي) is a multi-sport club based in Mansuriya district of Kuwait City. The most notable section is its professional football team in the Kuwait Premier League.

Al-Arabi SC was named Al-ʿUrūba (Arabic: العُروبَة, lit. 'The Arabism') at the beginning of 1953, and changed to Al-Arabi SC (The Arabian) in 1960. As winners of the Kuwait Emir Cup in 2008, Al-Arabi SC was the first Kuwaiti team to compete in the AFC Cup. Al-Arabi SC has 64 official trophies next to its name (62 domestic and 2 GCC), the most of any Kuwaiti football team. Al-Arabi SC's stadium is Sabah Al-Salem Stadium in Mansūriya, a suburb of the capital of the country, Kuwait City. It is the second-largest stadium in Kuwait. It had the same points as Kuwait SC in 2014–15 season, but the title went to Kuwait by the principle of the results of the matches between the two teams.

Al-Arabi SC is the only team in Kuwait that has never lost in the Kuwait Super Cup. Holding both records for appearances in the final of the Kuwait Crown Prince Cup 4 consecutive times tied with Kuwait SC and in Kuwait Emir Cup going to the final 11 consecutive times since 1962 to 1973, more than any Kuwaiti team.

== History ==
=== The beginning ===
The club was founded as Al-Uruba in mid-1953 as one of the first Kuwaiti teams. Some of the most notable players were Abdulwahab Al-Awadie, Abdulaziz Al-Khatieb, Musad Al-Musad, Mohammed Al-Dawlee, Abdulmajied Mohammed, Mohammed Al-Somale, Dasman Bakhiet, Ahmad Bodha, Monaier Al-Dagag, Fuad Al-Ashgar, Ahmad Hussain, Abbas Al-Shemaly, Mossa Al-Somale, Nayef Dalool and Mohhamed Salah Al-Roomy.

At first in 1960s Al-Arabi SC was structured with divisions of football, basketball, volleyball and weightlifting.

At the beginning Al-Arabi SC made many achievements, thanks to their players and submitted board members. Al-Arabi has many sports with separate facilities. Abdulaziz Al-Khatib multi-purpose hall is used for basketball, handball, volleyball, squash, and can accommodate about 2,000 spectators. The swimming pool has a capacity of 1,500 spectators. Club also has 4 tennis courts, gymnastics hall, judo, table tennis and boxing sections.

=== 1960–1980 (starting of Il-Za'īm) ===
Through the years Al-Arabi SC has won the Kuwait Premier League 7 times. They have also won 3 Joint Leagues, 6 Emir Cups and 1 Federation Cup.

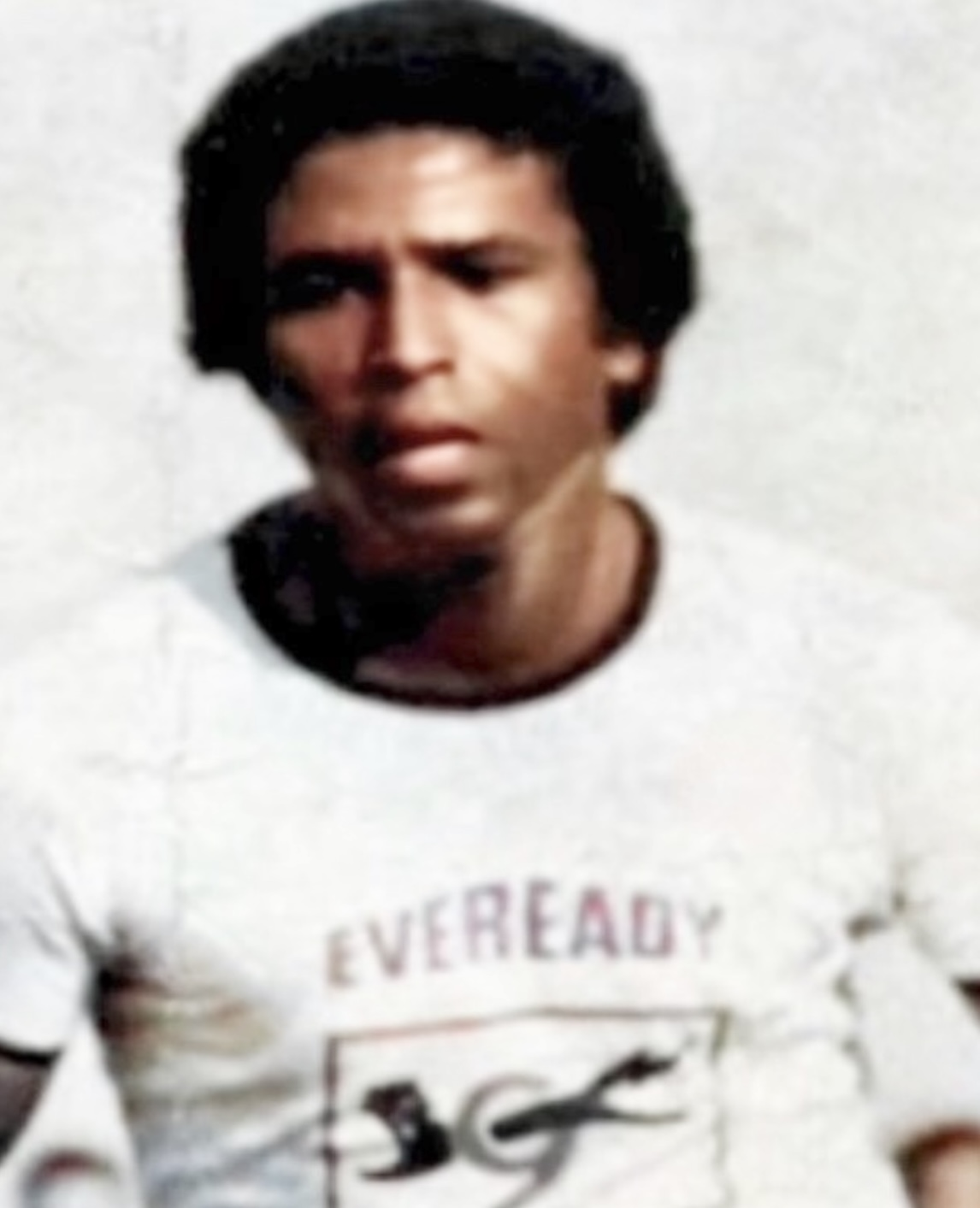
Taha Basry, Al-Arabi's star in the early 1970s

They were the first-ever Kuwaiti team to play outside Kuwait, by competing in friendly matches against teams through the Arabian Peninsula, showing competitive play. On 3 December 1974 Al-Arabi SC faced Lazio from Italy and beat them 1–0 in a friendly match.

=== 1980–2009 ===
In 1982 Al-Arabi SC was the first-ever team to win Gulf Club Champions Cup (GCC Champions League), and then won it again in 2003.

Al-Arabi SC had changed their logo in 1991. From 1990 to 2005 they have won 26 titles. Their then-last league title came in 2001–02, with occasional AFC Cup appearances.

=== 2010–2012 ===
Through these 2 seasons they won 2 titles: the Kuwait Super Cup and Kuwait Crown Prince Cup. On 27 December 2011, they were crowned champions of the Crown Prince Cup after 3 trophy-less seasons.

=== 2012–13 UAFA Cup ===
Al-Arabi had qualified for the final match of UAFA CUP. They were faced against Al-Fateh SC of Saudi Arabia. In the first leg they won 3–2 in Kuwait City, and in the away leg played in Saudi Arabia they tied 2-2, but they qualified to the next round on aggregate (5–4). In the quarter finals, they were matched up against Al-Nassr, again of Saudi Arabia. They lost 3–2 in the first leg played away in Saudi Arabia, however they won 2–0 at home, thus qualifying to the semi-final on aggregate (4–3). In the semi-final, they were matched up against Raja Casablanca. They tied at home 1-1 and in the away leg 2-2. However, they moved on to the final because of the away goals rule.

In the final, they played against USM Alger from Algeria. They tied 0–0 in Kuwait and lost they away leg 3–2, with several controversial refereeing decisions.

=== 2013–14 ===
In the 2013–14 season, Al-Arabi SC qualified for the Kuwait Crown Cup final third time in a row, losing to Al-Qadsia SC (2–1), with more controversial refereeing decisions. In the same season Al-Arabi SC finished 5th in the league and got knocked out of the Kuwait Emir Cup by Al-Qadsia penalties, but ended their season winning Kuwait Federation Cup 4–2 over Al-Salmiya SC.

=== 2014–2015 ===
In the 2014–15 season Al-Arabi signed Firas Al-Khatib, showing how strong they want to win Kuwaiti Premier League. They also signed Ivusa from Sahel SC, sent Mahmoud Al-Maowas on loan, and eventually released Ivusa, resigning Maowas and buying Hashem Al-Ramzi. However, Boris Bunjak told Khaled Khalaf he is not needed in Al-Arabi SC. When Al-Arabi SC left for a 2-week pre-season in Turkey, they took Ahmad Hawas, former Al-Salmiya player.

They have claimed seasonal seats to be sold the first time, for a fee of $385. On 16 October 2014, Al-Arabi SC became the first Kuwaiti team to have an anthem.

After defeating Kuwait SC 4–2 (aet) in the Crown Prince Cup final, it was Al-Arabi's 57th official title. ِ Al-Arabi lost the crucial Kuwait City Derby on 10 April 2015 vs Kuwait SC 1–0. The match had all the seats filled to the last, for the first time in the history of Kuwaiti football.

Manager Bunjak has requested preparation tour to Italy which was announced, but on 17 July 2015 it was officially stated that he has left the club.

=== Return to old ways ===
On 7 December 2015 it was announced that Luiz Felipe has left the club immediately after defeat to Al-Salmiya SC in the Crown Prince Cup. Boris Bunjak returned to manage the team right after.

After the loss of Emir Cup Final to Kuwait SC, the club went into war between fans and head office. After signing with Miodrag Ješić on 13 November 2016, they became the first club in the middle east to have seven managers across two seasons.

By 2021, Al-Arabi managed to win the seventeenth league title in its history, with the help of its Croatian coach Ante Miše after nineteen years, without any loss in 18 games.

== In popular culture ==
One of the first songs was in 2004, "Panorama Al-Arabi", dedicated to the fans and goal celebrations. As of 2012, the next song was released, "Hello Za'eem". It was used for the 2011–12 Kuwait Crown Prince Cup. On 16 October 2014, Al-Arabi SC became the first Kuwaiti team to have an anthem, introduced in match against Al-Yarmouk.

== Crest and colors ==
=== Colors ===
Al-Arabi SC have changed their colors over the years. Since 1960–90 their colors were light green and white as the away kit.

From 2000–present, they changed to a darker green and the away color was still white.

By 2012 it was announced that Al-Arabi SC will be wearing dark green as their home kit, the away kit will be blue, and the third kit will be white with green.

In the 2013–14 season, Al-Arabi SC wore only the home kit and third kit.

In 2019–present, Al-Arabi SC changed the logo colors from yellow to gold, and for the word 'club' in Arabic they made it white.

==== Kits ====
===== Home =====
1960–1980
1980–1985
1985–1994
1994–1999
1999–2003
2003–2008
2008–2010
2010–2014
2011–2012
2014–2016
2016–2017
2022–2023

Green	White

2021–2022

===== Away =====
2021–2022

== Classicos and derbies ==
=== Kuwait City Derby ===
The Kuwait City derby is match between Al-Arabi SC and Kuwait SC.

=== Al-Arabi SC vs Al-Salmiya SC ===
Matches between Al-Salmiya SC and Al-Arabi SC are often high-profile. In 2014, Al-Salmiya won their first encounter in the league.

== Current squad ==
As of 15 September 2026

Note: Flags indicate national team as defined under FIFA eligibility rules; some limited exceptions apply. Players may hold more than one non-FIFA nationality.

No.	Pos.	Nation	Player
2	DF	KUW	Abdulwahab Al-Awadi
3	DF	KUW	Abdullah Al-Buloushi
4	DF	KUW	Mohammed Khaled
5	DF	SYR	Jumma Abboud
6	MF	IRI	Ali Porusaniei
7	MF	KUW	Bader Al-Fadhel
8	MF	KUW	Hussain Ashkanani
10	MF	KUW	Bandar Al Salamah
11	FW	KUW	Talal Al-Qaisi
12	DF	KUW	Hamad Al Harbi
14	MF	KUW	Khaled Al-Mershed
15	DF	KUW	Hamad Al-Qallaf
16	DF	KUW	Ali Hasan Muhaisen
17	FW	KUW	Ali Khalaf

No.	Pos.	Nation	Player
18	MF	ETH	Kenean Markneh
19	MF	KUW	Yousef Majed
20	MF	KUW	Nayef Al-Shemmari
21	DF	KUW	Abdulaziz Nassary
22	GK	KUW	Sulaiman Abdulghafour
23	DF	BRA	Leonardo Sheldon
26	GK	KUW	Ahmed Al-Khaldi
35	GK	KUW	Abdulrahman Al-Harbi
41	DF	KUW	Abdullah Essa
73	MF	NED	Walid Ould-Chikh
77	FW	NGR	Anayo Iwuala
95	DF	SEN	Khadim Rassoul
98	FW	PLE	Zaid Qunbar
99	FW	KUW	Hussain Al-Aryan

== Staff ==
=== Board of directors ===
Position	Name
President	Abdulaziz Ashour
CEO	Osama Hussain
Football chairman	Ali Mandani

== Managerial history ==
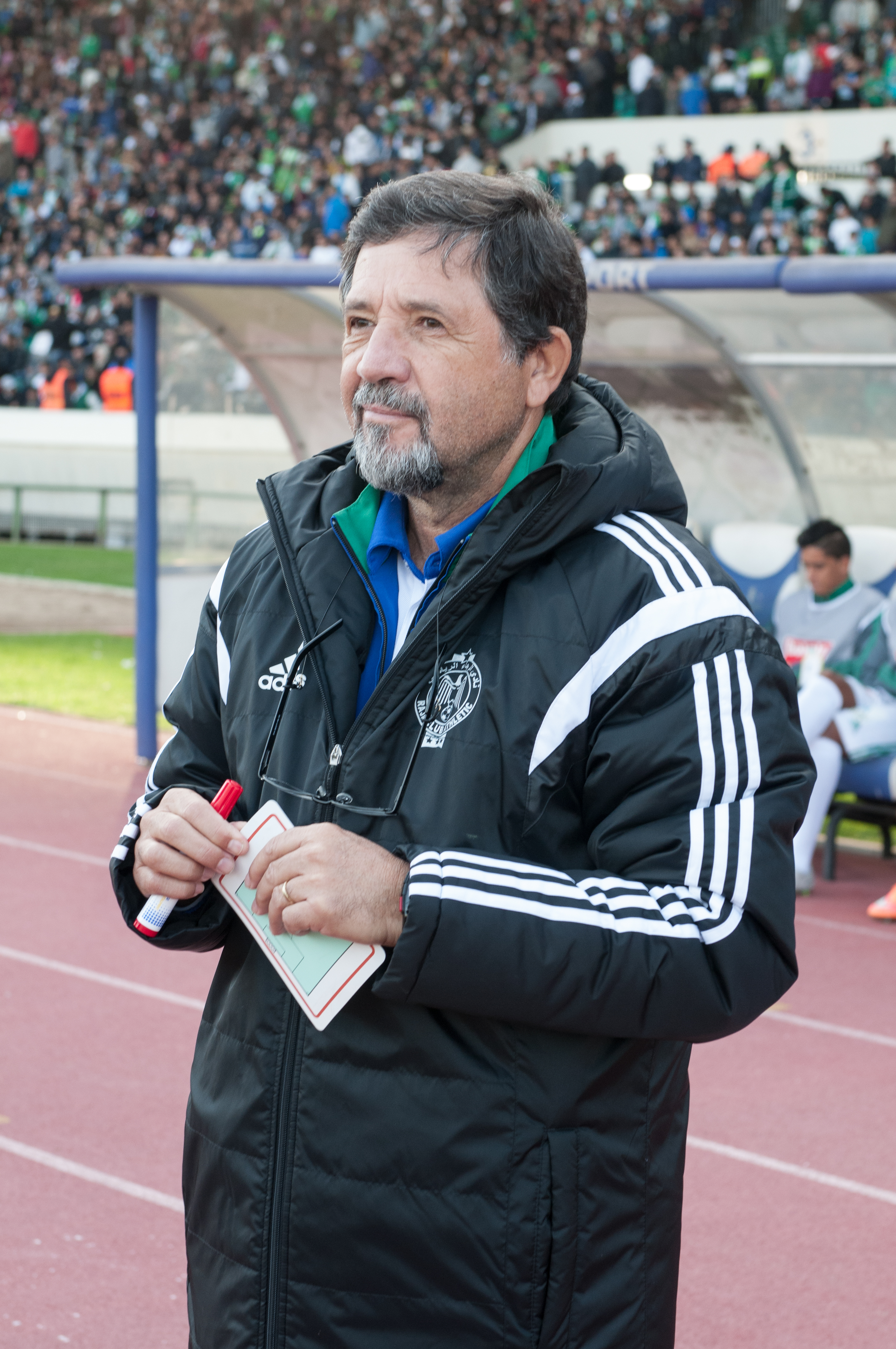
Serving from 2011 to 2014, José Romão is the club's longest lasting manager in the 21st century

Name	Nat.	From	To	Ref.
Todor Velev	(Bulgaria)	1974	1976	
Dave Mackay	(Scotland)	1978	1978	
Frank Upton	(England)	1981	1982	
Dave Mackay	(Scotland)	1987	1987	
Bobby Ferguson	(England)	1987	1989	
Colin Addison	(England)	1992	1993	
Bobby Campbell	(England)	1993	1994	
Mohammed Karam	(Kuwait)	1994	1995	
Jawad Maqseed	(Kuwait)	1996	1996	
Fawzi Ibrahim	(Kuwait)	1996	1997	
Ján Pivarník	(Slovakia)	1998	1999	
Dragan Gugleta	(Federal Republic of Yugoslavia)	1999	2000	
Ján Pivarník	(Slovakia)	June 2000	September 2001	
Valdeir Vieira	(Brazil)	September 2001	2003	
Sebastião Lazaroni	(Brazil)	June 2003	June 2004	
Mohammed Karam	(Kuwait)	June 2004	2004	
Mohsen Saleh	(Egypt)	August 2004	November 2005	
Valdeir Vieira	(Brazil)	November 2005	April 2006	
Ahmed Khalaf	(Kuwait)	April 2006	June 2006	
Nenad Stavrić	(Serbia)	July 2006	February 2007	
José Rachão	(Portugal)	February 2007	May 2008	
Ahmed Khalaf	(Kuwait)	May 2008	May 2009	
Zoran Popović	(Serbia)	May 2009	June 2009	
Dragan Skočić	(Croatia)	July 2009	May 2010	
Marcelo Cabo	(Brazil)	May 2010	March 2011	
Zoran Bebić	(Serbia)	March 2011	April 2011	
Fawzi Ibrahim	(Kuwait)	April 2011	June 2011	
José Romão	(Portugal)	June 2011	May 2014	
Boris Bunjak	(Serbia)	July 2014	July 2015	
Luís Filipe	(Portugal)	July 2015	December 2015	
Ahmed Askar (interim)	(Kuwait)	December 2015	December 2015	
Boris Bunjak	(Serbia)	December 2015	May 2016	
Fawzi Ibrahim	(Kuwait)	May 2016	October 2016	
Ahmed Askar (interim)	(Kuwait)	October 2016	November 2016	
Miodrag Ješić	(Serbia)	November 2016	March 2017	
Mohammed Ebrahim	(Kuwait)	June 2017	May 2018	
Hussam Al Sayed	(Syria)	June 2018	May 2019	
Juan Martínez	(Spain)	June 2019	September 2019	
Darko Nestorović	(Bosnia and Herzegovina)	October 2019	June 2020	
Bassem Marmar	(Lebanon)	July 2020	October 2020	
Ahmed Othman	(Kuwait)	October 2020	December 2020	
Ante Miše	(Croatia)	December 2020	June 2022	
Jugoslav Trenchovski	(North Macedonia)	July 2022	September 2022	
Rusmir Cviko	(Bosnia and Herzegovina)	September 2022	May 2023	
Thomas Brdarić	(Germany)	June 2023	November 2023	
Darko Nestorović	(Bosnia and Herzegovina)	November 2023	April 2024	
Nasser Al-Shatti	(Kuwait)	April 2024	July 2025	
Marco Alves	(Portugal)	July 2025	November 2025	

== Al Arabi in Asia ==
Season	Competition	Round	Country	Club	Home	Away
1971	Asian Club Championship	Group stage	(Malaysia)	Perak FA	3–0	
1971	Asian Club Championship	Group stage	(Iran)	Taj Club	0–0	
1971	Asian Club Championship	Group stage	(South Korea)	ROK Army	0–1	
1991–92	Asian Club Championship	1st Round	(Saudi Arabia)	Al-Hilal	1–1	0–2
1993–94	Asian Club Championship	1st Round	(Saudi Arabia)	Al Shabab	1–7	2–5
1997–98	Asian Club Championship	1st Round	(Lebanon)	Al-Ansar	0–1	1–2
2003	AFC Champions League	3rd round	(Syria)	Al-Ittihad	4–0	1–1
2003	AFC Champions League	4th round	(Turkmenistan)	Nisa Aşgabat	–	–
2004	AFC Champions League	Group stage	(Saudi Arabia)	Al-Ittihad	0–0	0–2
2004	AFC Champions League	Group stage	(Iran)	Sepahan	2–2	1–3
2004	AFC Champions League	Group stage	(Uzbekistan)	FK Neftchi	3–2	2–1
2006	AFC Champions League	Group stage	(Iraq)	Al-Quwa Al-Jawiya	0–1	0–3
2006	AFC Champions League	Group stage	(Qatar)	Al-Sadd	1–2	1–4
2006	AFC Champions League	Group stage	(Saudi Arabia)	Al Shabab	3–0	0–2
2007	AFC Champions League	Group stage	(Iraq)	Al-Zawra'a	0–1	2–3
2007	AFC Champions League	Group stage	(United Arab Emirates)	Al-Wahda	3–2	1–4
2007	AFC Champions League	Group stage	(Qatar)	Al-Rayyan	1–1	3–1
2009	AFC Cup	Group stage	(Oman)	Al-Oruba	2–0	1–1
2009	AFC Cup	Group stage	(Iraq)	Arbil	2–0	1–1
2009	AFC Cup	Group stage	(Lebanon)	Al-Mabarrah	4–2	1–2
2009	AFC Cup	Round of 16	(Lebanon)	Safa	2–1 (aet)	
2009	AFC Cup	Quarter-finals	(Syria)	Al-Karamah	0–0 (aet) (4–5 pen.)	0–0
2022	AFC Cup	Group stage	(Bahrain)	Al-Riffa	3–2	
2022	AFC Cup	Group stage	(Palestine)	Shabab Al-Khalil SC	1–0	
2022	AFC Cup	Group stage	(Oman)	Dhofar	1–1	
2022	AFC Cup	Quarter-final	(Oman)	Al-Seeb Club	1–2 (aet)	
2023–24	AFC Cup	Group stage	(Iraq)	Al-Zawraa SC	1–1	2–1
2023–24	AFC Cup	Group stage	(Bahrain)	Al-Riffa SC	0–3	1–2
2023–24	AFC Cup	Group stage	(Lebanon)	Nejmeh SC	0–0	2–1
2024–25	AFC Challenge League	Group stage	(Kyrgyzstan)	FC Abdysh-Ata Kant	0–1	
2024–25	AFC Challenge League	Group stage	(Maldives)	Maziya S&RC	2–0	
2024–25	AFC Challenge League	Group stage	(Turkmenistan)	FK Arkadag	3–2	
2024–25	AFC Challenge League	Quarter-final	(Oman)	Al-Seeb Club	1–0	2–2 (aet)
2024–25	AFC Challenge League	Semi-final	(Turkmenistan)	FK Arkadag	2–0	0–3
2025–26	AFC Challenge League	Preliminary Round	(Maldives)	Maziya S&RC	4–0	
2025–26	AFC Challenge League	Group Stage	(Lebanon)	Safa SC	2–2	
2025–26	AFC Challenge League	Group Stage	(Tajikistan)	Regar-TadAZ Tursunzoda	2–1	
2025–26	AFC Challenge League	Group Stage	(Kyrgyzstan)	FC Muras United	1–1	
2026–27	AFC Champions League Two	Preliminary Round	(India)	East Bengal FC	1–4 (aet)	
2026–27	AFC Challenge League	Group B	(Tajikistan)	Istiklol	0–2	
2026–27	AFC Challenge League	Group B	(Lebanon)	Nejmeh	1–3	
2026–27	AFC Challenge League	Group B	(Syria)	Homs Al Fidaa	0–1	

== Al Arabi in UAFA ==
Season	Competition	Round		Club	Home	Away
1982*	GCC Champions League	Final	(Bahrain)	Riffa S.C.	2–0	
1983*	GCC Champions League	Final	(Saudi Arabia)	Ettifaq FC	2nd place	
1985*	GCC Champions League	Final	(Saudi Arabia)	Al-Hilal FC	2nd place	
1989*	GCC Champions League	1st round	(Bahrain)	Al-Muharraq SC	1–2	
1989*	GCC Champions League	2nd round	(Oman)	Fanja SC	1–1	
1989*	GCC Champions League	3rd round	(United Arab Emirates)	Al-Wasl F.C.	2–1	
1989*	GCC Champions League	4th round	(Saudi Arabia)	Al-Hilal FC	4–2	
1994*	GCC Champions League	Final	(Saudi Arabia)	Al Shabab FC (Riyadh)	2nd place	
2003*	GCC Champions League	1st round	(Bahrain)	Al-Muharraq SC	2–1	
2003*	GCC Champions League	2nd round	(Oman)	Al-Oruba SC	0–0	
2003*	GCC Champions League	3rd round	(Qatar)	Qatar SC	0–0	
2003*	GCC Champions League	4th round	(Saudi Arabia)	Al-Hilal FC	1–0	
2007	GCC Champions League	Group-Stage	(Bahrain)	Al-Muharraq SC	2–2	
2007	GCC Champions League	Group stage	(Oman)	Al-Nasr S.C.S.C.	0–1	
2007	GCC Champions League	Group stage	(United Arab Emirates)	Al-Sharjah SCC	1–1	
2009–10	GCC Champions League	Group stage	(United Arab Emirates)	Al Shabab (Dubai)	2–0	1–1
2009–10	GCC Champions League	Group stage	(Bahrain)	Al-Muharraq SC	1–0	5–1
2011	GCC Champions League	Group stage	(Bahrain)	Al-Ahli Club (Manama)	Withdrew	
2011	GCC Champions League	Group stage	(United Arab Emirates)	Al-Ahli Dubai F.C.	1–2	0–1
2011	GCC Champions League	Quarter-final	(Qatar)	Al-Arabi SC (Qatar)	2–0	
2011	GCC Champions League	Semi-final	(United Arab Emirates)	Al Shabab (Dubai)	2–2	0–2
2012	GCC Champions League	Group-Stage	(United Arab Emirates)	Al-Wahda F.C.	2–1	5–1
2012	GCC Champions League	Group stage	(Qatar)	Al Kharaitiyat SC	3–0	1–2
2012	GCC Champions League	Quarter-final	(Bahrain)	Riffa S.C.	2–1	
2012	GCC Champions League	Semi-final	(Bahrain)	Al-Muharraq SC	2–1	0–2
2013	UAFA Cup	1st Round	(Saudi Arabia)	Al-Fateh SC	3–2	2–2
2013	UAFA Cup	Quarter-final	(Saudi Arabia)	Al Nassr FC	2–3	2–0
2013	UAFA Cup	Semi-final	(Morocco)	Raja Casablanca	1–1	2–2
2013	UAFA Cup	Final	(Algeria)	USM Alger	0–0	2–3

Notes: *Round-robin tournament

== Club presidents ==
The founding committee from 1953 to 1960 involved Mohalhel Mohammed Al-Mudhaf and Khalid Ahmed Al-Mudhaf.

Years	President
1960–61	(Kuwait) Mohalhel Mohammed Al-Mudhaf
1961–67	(Kuwait) Khalid Ahmed Al-Mudhaf
1967–68	(Kuwait) Moussa Rashid Al-Fahad
1969–70	(Kuwait) Mohammed Saleh Al-Mulla
1970–78	(Kuwait) Sheikh Salman Al-Hamoud Al-Sabah
1978–81	(Kuwait) Ahmed Sayed Abdelsamad
1981–83	(Kuwait) Sheikh Nayef Jaber Al-Ahmad Al-Sabah
1983–89	(Kuwait) Ahmed Sayed Abdelsamad
1989–92	(Kuwait) Sheikh Ali Al-Abdullah Al-Salem Al-Sabah
1992–93	(Kuwait) Fahd Abdulaziz Al-Humaiadhan
1993–94	(Kuwait) Mohammed Saleh Al-Mulla
1994–97	(Kuwait) Ahmed Sayed Abdelsamad
1997–00	(Kuwait) Ibrahim Abdullah Al-Shehab
2000–10	(Kuwait) Jamal Shaker Al-Kazemi
2010	(Kuwait) Sheikh Salman Al-Hamoud Al-Sabah
2010–19	(Kuwait) Jamal Shaker Al-Kazemi
2019–	(Kuwait) Abdulaziz Ashour

== Records ==
=== Team records ===
- First Kuwaiti team to win the league 3 times in a row:

1961–62, 1962–63, 1963–64

- First Kuwaiti team to win the league 4 times in a row:

1981–82, 1982–83, 1983–84, 1984–85

- First Kuwaiti team to win the league without a loss or draw:

1961–62

- First Kuwaiti team to win the league without a loss:

1962–63

- Longest unbeaten run in the league:

33 matches straight

- Record league victory:

10–0 v Al-Shorta 1962–63
10–0 v Al-Fahaheel 9 October 1964

- Record biggest league loss:

0–5 v Kazma SC 27 October 1972
0–5 v Kuwait SC 27 November 1975
1–6 v Qadsia SC 9 December 1976

=== Individual records ===
- Most goals:

1. Abdulrahman Al-Dawla
2. Firas Al-Khatib – 186
3. Khaled Khalaf – 66
4. Ahmad Hayel – 55
5. Fahad Al-Rashidi – 51

Most appearances:

Abdulrahman Al-Dawla

== Affiliated clubs ==
- (Scotland) Celtic

Celtic officially announced their affiliation with Al-Arabi SC in order to help both teams assist one another through ideas, experience and scouting. The agreement encompasses all sports mutually practiced by both clubs, but is mainly focused on cooperation in football.

- (Scotland) Celtic Academy

== FIFA World Cup and AFC Asian Cup players ==
FIFA World Cup 1982 (Spain)

- Kuwait
  - Abdulaziz Al-Buloushi
  - Abdullah Al-Buloushi
  - Sami Al-Hashash
  - Mohammed Karam

1984 AFC Asian Cup (Singapore)

- Kuwait
  - Abdulaziz Al-Buloushi
  - Abdullah Al-Buloushi
  - Sami Al-Hashash
  - Mohammed Karam
  - Samir Said

1996 AFC Asian Cup (United Arab Emirates)

- Kuwait
  - Sami Al Lenqawi
  - Osama Hussain
  - Abdullah Seehan

2000 AFC Asian Cup (Lebanon)

- Kuwait
  - Osama Hussain
  - Ahmed Jasem

2011 AFC Asian Cup (Qatar)

- Kuwait
  - Ahmed Saad Al Rashidi
  - Khalid Al-Rashidi
  - Khaled Khalaf
  - Ali Maqseed

2015 AFC Asian Cup (Australia)

- Kuwait
  - Hameed Al Qallaf
  - Sulaiman Abdulghafour
  - Ali Maqseed
  - Abdulaziz Al Salimi
  - Talal Nayef
  - Mahmoud Dashti
  - Mohammad Frieh
  - Fahad Al Rashidi

== Honours ==
- 65 official trophies

=== Domestic ===
- Kuwait Premier League: 17

1961–62*, 1962–63, 1963–64, 1965–66, 1966–67, 1969–70, 1979–80, 1981–82, 1982–83, 1983–84, 1984–85, 1987–88, 1988–89, 1992–93, 1996–97, 2001–02, 2020–21

- (Runners-up): 16

1967–68, 1968–69, 1970–71, 1972–73, 1973–74, 1978–79, 1980–81, 1986–87, 1989–90, 2002–03, 2003–04, 2014–15, 2022–23, 2023–24, 2024–25, 2025–26

- Kuwaiti Division One: 1

1999–00

- Kuwait Emir Cup: 16

1961–62*, 1962–63, 1963–64, 1965–66, 1968–69, 1970–71, 1980–81, 1982–83, 1991–92, 1995–96, 1998–99, 1999–00, 2004–05, 2005–06, 2007–08, 2019–20

- (Runners-up): 14

1964–65, 1966–67, 1967–68, 1969–70, 1971–72, 1973–74, 1989–90, 1990–91, 1994–95, 1997–98, 2008–09, 2015–16, 2017–18, 2024-25

- Kuwait Crown Prince Cup: 10

1995–96, 1996–97, 1998–99, 1999–00, 2006–07, 2011–12, 2014–15, 2021–22, 2022–23, 2025-26

- (Runners-up): 6

2002–03, 2009–10, 2012–13, 2013–14, 2019–20, 2024-25

- Kuwait Super Cup: 3

2008*, 2012, 2021

- (Runners-up): 1

2020

- Kuwait Joint League: 5 (defunct)

1969–70, 1970–71, 1971–72, 1984–85, 1987-88

- Kuwait Federation cup: 8

1969–70, 1978–1979, 1995–96, 1996–97, 1998–99, 1999–00, 2000–2001, 2013–14

- (runner-up): 3

2009–10, 2012–13, 2021-22

- Al Kurafi Cup: 3 (defunct)

1998–99, 2000–01, 2001–02

- (Runners-up): 2

2003–04, 2005–06

=== Regional ===
- GCC Champions League: 2

1982*, 2003

- (Runners-up): 3

1983, 1985, 1994

- Arab Champions League / UAFA Cup / Arab Club Championship:
- (Runners-up): 1

2012–13

=== Friendlies ===
- Kuwait unofficial league: 1

1956–57

- (Runners-up): 2

1954–55, 1955–56

- Shot Cup: 1

1978–79

- Binjab FC Cup: 1

1970–71

- Perak friendly Cup: 1

1970–71

- Qasion Cup: 1

1966–67

- Eintracht e.V Cup special: 1

1981–82

- Bani Yas International Tournament: 1
- 2013–14: 3rd place

== Kit manufacturers and shirt sponsors ==
Period	Kit manufacturer	Shirt sponsor
1976–82	Puma	None
1982–96	Adidas	None
1996–02	Warrior	Hyundai
2002–04	Nike	Hyundai
2004–09	Nike	Wataniya Telecom; Al Ahli Bank of Kuwait
2009–12	Adidas	Wataniya Telecom; Al Ahli Bank of Kuwait
2012–13	Adidas	Al Ahli Bank of Kuwait
2013–14	ANTA	Al Ahli Bank of Kuwait
2014–15	Macron	Al Ahli Bank of Kuwait
2015–16	Macron	Al Ahli Bank of Kuwait; Health House Nutrition*
2016–2019	Erreà	Al Ahli Bank of Kuwait
2019–2023	Fitcom	Al Ahli Bank of Kuwait
2023-2025	Unique	Al Ahli Bank of Kuwait
2025-	Alnasser	Al Ahli Bank of Kuwait

Notes:

- Sleeve sponsor

== Notable international matches ==
1971: Al-Arabi SC 3–0 (Malaysia) Perak
1974: Al-Arabi SC 1–0 (Italy) Lazio
2014: Al-Arabi SC 2–0 (Turkey) Bursaspor
2014: Al-Arabi SC 2–1 (Turkey) Bursa Nilüferspor

=== Against national teams ===
1977: Al-Arabi SC 1–1 Poland
2005: Al-Arabi SC 2–0 Syria
2007: Al-Arabi SC 1–1 Ivory Coast
2014: Al-Arabi SC 1–0 Kyrgyzstan

== See also ==
- List of football clubs in Kuwait
