= Kazma SC =

Kuwaiti football club

- Full name: Kazma Sporting Club
- Short name: Kazma
- Founded: 31 August 1964; 62 years ago
- Ground: Al-Sadaqua Walsalam Stadium; Adiliya
- Capacity: 21,500
- Chairman: Ali Alobaid
- League: Kuwait Premier League
- 2025–26: Kuwait Premier League, 4th of 10
- Website: www.kazmasc.com
Home colours	Away colours

Kazma Sporting Club (Arabic: نادي كاظمة الرياضي) is a Kuwaiti professional football club. Founded in 1964, the club competes in the Kuwaiti Premier League.

== Club history ==
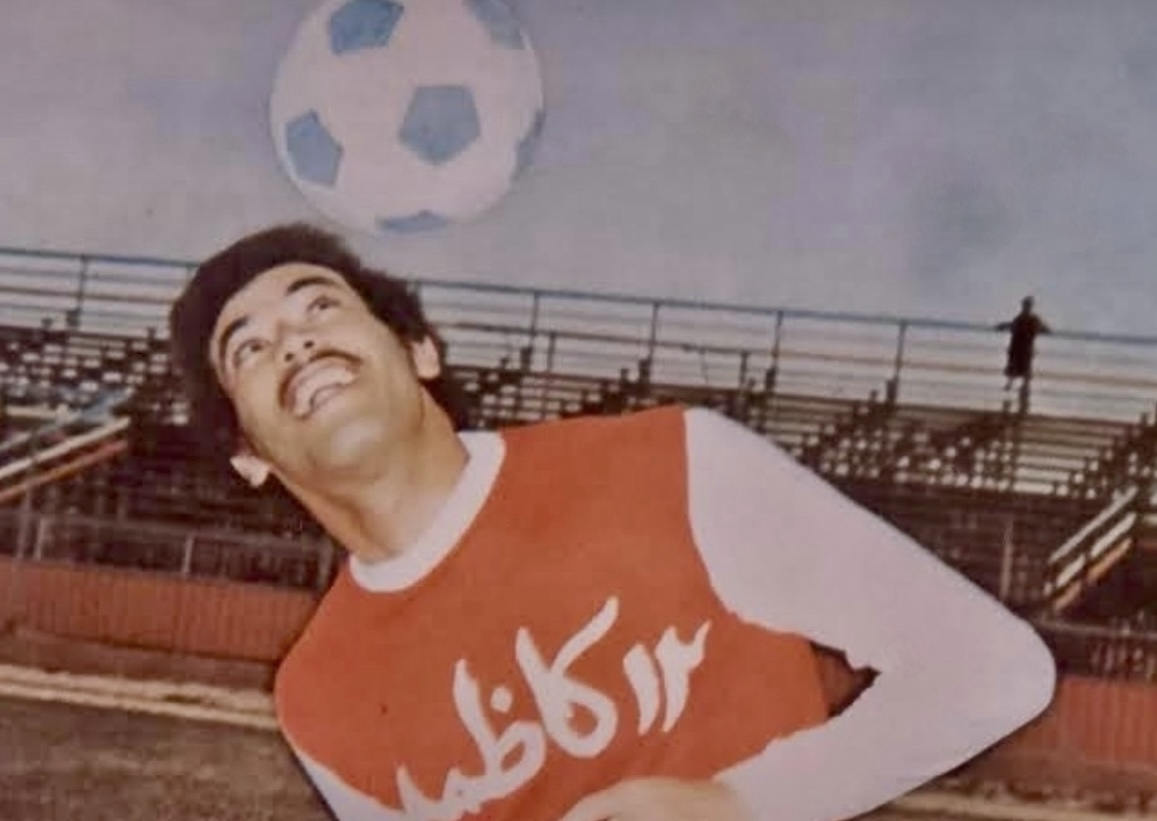
Hassan Shehata with Kazma in 1972

=== Naming ===
The club is named after the area of Kathma, which is located 40 kilometers north of Kuwait City, on the Kuwait coast. In 630 A.D., the battle of Chains took place in Kathma.

=== Recent history ===
On 21 December 2009, under head coach Ilie Balaci, Kazma played a friendly match against reigning La Liga champions Barelona to commemorate the 45th anniversary of the club. The match ended in a 1–1 draw. Barcelona received €1.7 million for participating in the match.

2009-12-21
19:35 UTC+3

Kazma (Kuwait)	1–1	(Spain) Barcelona
Abdullah Al Dhafiri 90'		Bojan Krkić 80'

Al-Sadaqua Walsalam Stadium, Kuwait City
Attendance: 21,500

Won the Kuwait Emir Cup in 2011 a 1–0 over Kuwait SC.

=== 2011- ===
On November 10, 2015, after four years of trophy-less seasons the club won the 2015-16 Kuwait Federation Cup vs Kuwait SC 2-1 goals scored by Patrick Fabiano.

== Stadium ==
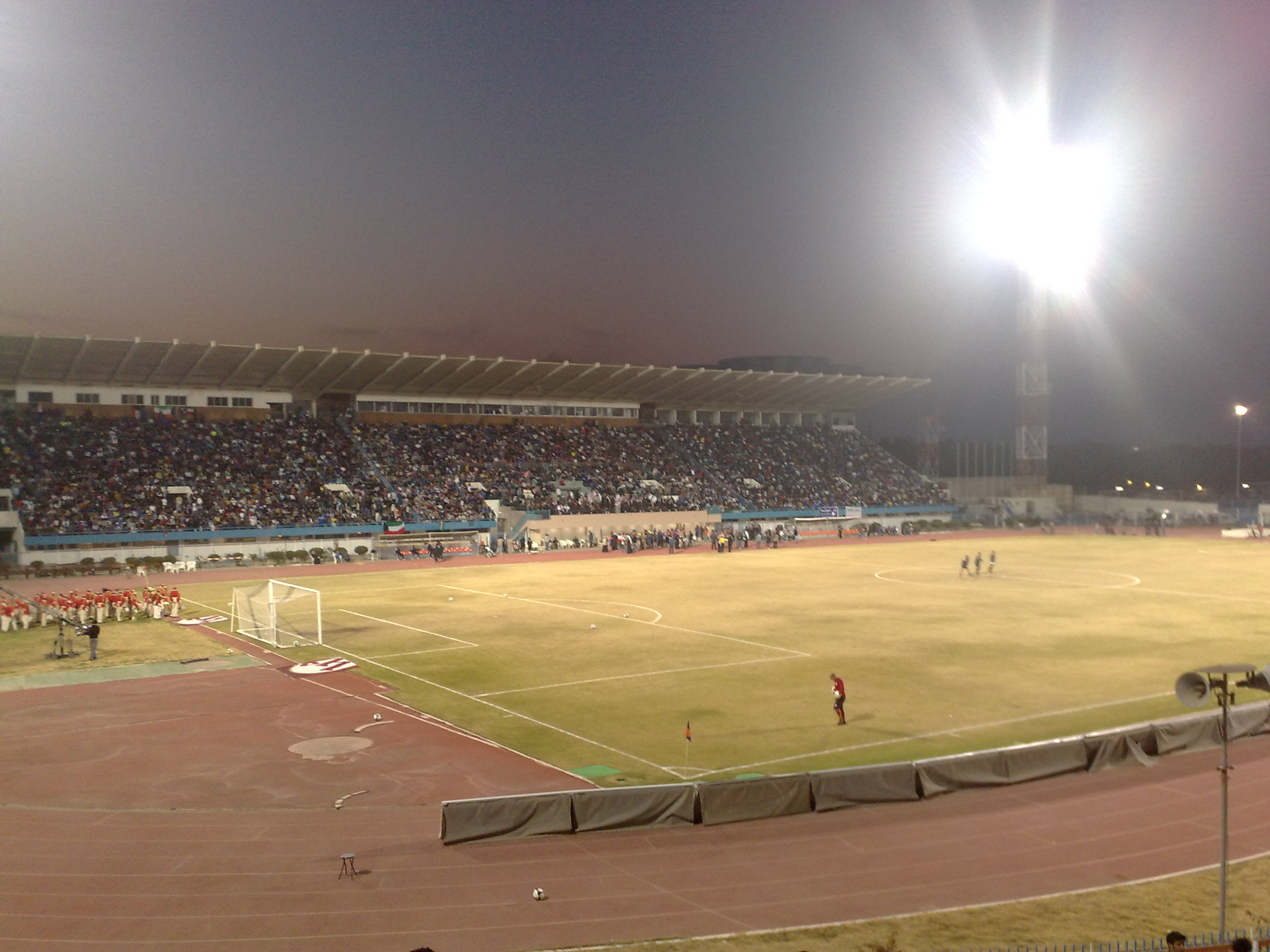
Al-Sadaqua Walsalam Stadium in Adiliya

Kazma's stadium, Al-Sadaqua Walsalam Stadium, is a multi-purpose stadium located in Kuwait City, Kuwait. It is currently used mostly for football matches. The stadium has a 21,500 holding capacity. The stadium hosted two Arabian Gulf Cup tournaments, the first being in 1990, which Kuwait won for the seventh time. However, the second time in 2003 Kuwait ended up in sixth place, which is their worst ever ranking. It has also hosted many finals of the Kuwait Emir Cup and Kuwait Crown Cup.

== Presidents ==
- Ahmad Khalid Al-Fozan (Oct 1964 – Oct 1965)
- Yousef Abdullah Mohammed Shaheen Al-Ghanim (Nov 1965 – June 1995)
- Abdullah Al-Dakheel Al-Rasheed (June 1995 – Sep 1995)
- Suleiman Mohamed Saleh Al-Adsani (Sept 1995 – May 1997)
- Khalid Nasser Al-Sanea (May 1997 – May 2000)
- Suleiman Mohamed Saleh Al-Adsani (May 2000 – May 2006)
- Asad Ahmed Al-Banwan (May 2006–)

== Achievements ==
Kazma has 20 official championships.

=== Official ===
- Kuwaiti Premier League: 4

1985–86, 1986–87, 1993–94, 1995–96

- Kuwait Emir Cup: 8

1982, 1984, 1990, 1995, 1997, 1998, 2011, 2022

- Kuwait Crown Cup: 1

1995
Runners-up : 2007

- Gulf Club Champions Cup: 2

1987, 1995
Runners-up 1988, 1997

- Kuwaiti Division One: 1

1968–69

- Kuwait Super Cup:

Runners-up : 2011, 2022, 2023–24

- Kuwait Federation Cup: 2

2015–16, 2017–18
Runners-up : 2009, 2012

- Al Khurafi Cup: 2

2004, 2007

=== Friendly ===
- Al Hasawi Super Cup: 1

2007

== Futsal ==
- Kuwaiti Futsal League: 2

2014–15, 2015–16

- Kuwait Futsal Super Cup: 3

2015, 2017, 2018

== Current squad ==
As of 8 February 2026

Note: Flags indicate national team as defined under FIFA eligibility rules; some limited exceptions apply. Players may hold more than one non-FIFA nationality.

No.	Pos.	Nation	Player
7	MF	YEM	Nasser Al-Gahwashi
3	DF	KUW	Bader Thekrallah
4	MF	KUW	Sultan Al Enezi
5	MF	KUW	Khaled Shaman Al-Mutairi
6	MF	KUW	Abdullah Al Fahd
7	FW	KUW	Talal Al-Qaisi
8	MF	KUW	Naser Faleh
9	FW	KUW	Bandar Bouresli
10	FW	KUW	Nasser Al-Faraj
11	FW	KUW	Meshaal Marzouq
12	DF	EGY	Mohamed Antar
16	DF	KUW	Dhari Al-Raqm
17	FW	KUW	Shabaib Al-Khaldi
19	MF	KUW	Jarah Al-Heleeli
20	FW	JOR	Ali Al-Azaizeh
21	DF	ALG	Mouad Hadded
22	GK	KUW	Khalifah Raheel

No.	Pos.	Nation	Player
23	DF	JOR	Yousef Abu Al-Jazar
30	FW	JOR	Anas Al-Awadat
33	GK	KUW	Hussein Kankoni (on loan from Al-Arabi)
97	DF	ALG	Drice Chaabi
99	FW	BEN	Samson Akinyoola
—	MF	COL	Hansel Zapata
—	DF	KUW	Ali Ateeq
—	DF	KUW	Bandar Al-Barazi
—	MF	KUW	Montaser Al-Abdulsalam
—	DF	KUW	Abdulrahman Al-Dehani
—	GK	KUW	Abdulrahman Al-Majdali
—	DF	KUW	Abdulaziz Rassam
—	DF	KUW	Saleh Faisal
—	DF	KUW	Aqeel Al-Hazeem
—	MF	KUW	Othman Al-Shammari
—	DF	KUW	Mohammad Al-Azmi
—	MF	KUW	Shereedah Al-Shereedah

== Recent seasons ==
Kazma's biggest wins

- In Asia

1988: Kazma 3–0 (Bahrain) Muharraq Club
1989: Kazma 3–0 (United Arab Emirates) Sharjah
1995: Kazma 9–0 (Oman) Dhofar
1996: Kazma 4–1 (United Arab Emirates) Al Ain
1999: Kazma 3–0 (Saudi Arabia) Al Nassr

- Friendlies

2008: Kazma 7–1 (Slovakia) Spartak Trnava
2009: Kazma 1–1 (Egypt) Ismaily
2009: Kazma 1–1 (Spain) Barcelona

== Kazma in Asia ==
Competition	Pld	W	D	L	GF	GA
Asian Club Championship	21	10	4	6	33	16
Asian Cup Winners Cup	18	8	5	5	46	25
AFC Cup	18	8	3	7	22	20
Total	57	26	12	18	101	61

Competition	Round	Country	Club	Home	Away
1987–88
Asian Club Championship	Q1	(Saudi Arabia)	Al Hilal	0–1	
Asian Club Championship	Q1	(Bahrain)	Muharraq Club	3–0	
Asian Club Championship	Q1	(United Arab Emirates)	Al Nasr	1–0	
Asian Club Championship	Q1	(Oman)	Al-Fanja	2–0	
Asian Club Championship	GS	(Japan)	Yomiuri	1–2	
Asian Club Championship	GS	(China)	August 1st	1–0	
Asian Club Championship	GS	(Malaysia)	Federal Territory	1–1	
1988–89
Asian Club Championship	Q1	(Bahrain)	West Riffa	2–0	
Asian Club Championship	Q1	(Oman)	Al-Fanja	3–1	
Asian Club Championship	Q1	(United Arab Emirates)	Sharjah	3–0	
Asian Club Championship	Q1	(Saudi Arabia)	Al-Ittifaq	1–1	1–2
Asian Club Championship	GS	(India)	Mohun Bagan	1–0	
Asian Club Championship	GS	(Iraq)	Al-Rasheed	0–2	
Asian Club Championship	GS	(China)	Guangdong	1–1	
1992
Asian Cup Winners Cup	R1	(Qatar)	Al Sadd	1–1 (2–4p)	1–1
Asian Cup Winners Cup	QF	(Saudi Arabia)	Al Nassr	0–1	1–2
1994–95
Asian Club Championship	R1	(Qatar)	Al Arabi	2–1	0–1
1996
Asian Cup Winners Cup	R1	(Oman)	Oman Club	3–1	1–1
Asian Cup Winners Cup	R2	(United Arab Emirates)	Al Ain	2–0	4–1
Asian Cup Winners Cup	QF	(Saudi Arabia)	Riyadh SC	1–0	1–2
1996–97
Asian Club Championship	R1	(Oman)	Dhofar	9–0	1–1
Asian Club Championship	R2	(Qatar)	Al-Rayyan	0–1	1–1
1998
Asian Cup Winners Cup	R1	(Bahrain)	Bahrain	2–2	3–2
Asian Cup Winners Cup	R2	(Qatar)	Al Ittihad	0–0	0–1
1999
Asian Cup Winners Cup	R1	(United Arab Emirates)	Al Wahda	2–0	3–2
Asian Cup Winners Cup	R2	(Saudi Arabia)	Al Nassr	3–0	1–2
Asian Cup Winners Cup	QF	(Iraq)	Al Talaba	–	
2010
AFC Cup	GS	(Lebanon)	Al-Ahed	1–0	2–1
AFC Cup	GS	(Syria)	Al Jaish	0–1	1–0
AFC Cup	GS	(Uzbekistan)	Nasaf Qarshi	0–0	2–1
AFC Cup	R16	(Jordan)	Shabab Al-Ordon	1–1 (aet) (6–5 p)	
AFC Cup	QF	(Syria)	Al-Ittihad	0–1	2–3
2012
AFC Cup	GS	(Iraq)	Arbil	1–2	1–1
AFC Cup	GS	(India)	East Bengal	3–0	2–1
AFC Cup	GS	(Yemen)	Al-Oruba	1–1	2–1
AFC Cup	R16	(Jordan)	Al-Wehdat	1–2 (aet)	

== FIFA World Cup and AFC Asian Cup Players ==
FIFA World Cup 1982 (Spain)

- Kuwait
  - Nassir Al-Ghanim
  - Jamal Al-Qabendi
  - Hamoud Al-Shemmari
  - Yussef Al-Suwayed
  - Adam Marjam
  - Abdullah Mayouf

1984 AFC Asian Cup

- Kuwait
  - Jamal Al-Qabandi
  - Homoud Al-Shammari
  - Yousef Suwayed

1996 AFC Asian Cup

- Kuwait
  - Fawaz Al Ahmad
  - Yousef Al Dookhi
  - Ayman Al Husaini
  - Badr Haji
  - Esam Sakeen

2000 AFC Asian Cup

- Kuwait
  - Falah Al Majidi
  - Ahmed Al Mutairi
  - Naser Al Omran
  - Shehab Kankoune
  - Esam Sekin

2004 AFC Asian Cup

- Kuwait
  - Fahad Al Hamad
  - Nawaf Al Humaidan
  - Khaled Al Shammari
  - Shehab Kankoune

AFC Asian Cup 2007

- Bahrain
  - Mohamed Husain
- Oman
  - Younis Al Mushaifri

AFC Asian Cup 2011

- Kuwait
  - Fahad Al Enezi
  - Yousef Nasser

== Managerial history ==
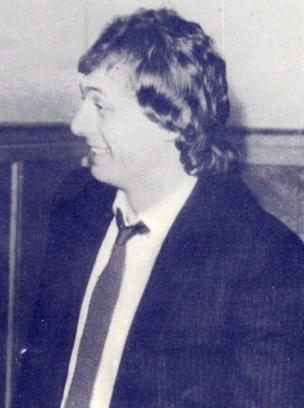
Ilie Balaci coach of Kazma 2009–10

Years	Name	Nationality
1985–90	Eddie Firmani	Italy
1994–96	Milan Máčala	Czech Republic
1997–99	Theo Bücker	Germany
1999	Adam Marjan	Kuwait
2001–02	Fouzy Ibrahim	Kuwait
2002–03	Acácio Casimiro	Portugal
June 2004–Nov 2004	Júlio César Leal	Brazil
2004–05	Johan Boskamp	Netherlands
2005–06	Zlatko Krmpotić	Serbia
June 2006–July 2007	José Garrido	Portugal
2007–08	Marinko Koljanin	Croatia
2008–09	Robertinho	Brazil
2009–10	Ilie Balaci	Romania
2010	Jamal Yaqoob	Kuwait
2010–June 2012	Milan Máčala	Czech Republic
July 2012 – 2013	Miodrag Radulović	Montenegro
2013–2015	Jacenir Silva	Brazil
May 2015–July 2017	Florin Motroc	Romania
July 2017 – 2019	Toni	Portugal
2019–2020	Boris Bunjak	Serbia
2020–2021	Beto Bianchi	Brazil
2021–2022	Darko Nestorović	(Bosnia and Herzegovina) Bosnia
2022	Željko Markov	Serbia
2022–2023	Ilie Stan	Romania
2023–	Sérgio Farias	Brazil

=== Affiliated clubs ===
- (Argentina) Boca Juniors

== Other sports ==
Besides football, the club has teams for handball, basketball, volleyball, waterpolo, Squash, athletics, Gymnastics, Swimming, Boxing, Judo, Weightlifting, Taekwando, and Ice Hockey.

=== Basketball ===

- FIBA Asia Champions Cup: twice finished third in Indonesia 1990 in Jakarta and Thailand 1992 in Bangkok

=== Handball team achievements ===

- Asian Club League Handball Championship: 2
  - 1998 in (Jordan) Amman
  - 1999 in (Iran) Isfahan

== Performance in AFC (Asian) Competitions ==
- Asian Club Championship: 4 appearances

1987: Group Stage (Top 8)
1988: Group Stage (Top 8)
1995: First Round
1997: Second Round

- Asian Cup Winners Cup: 4 appearances

1991–92: Quarter-Finals
1995–96: Quarter-Finals
1997–98: Second Round
1998–99: Quarter-Finals (withdrew)

- AFC Cup: 2 appearances

2010: Quarter-Finals
2012: Round of 16

== See also ==
- List of football clubs in Kuwait

Preceded by Al-Shabab	Gulf Club Champions Cup; 1995	Succeeded by Al-Nasr
Preceded by Al-Hilal	Gulf Club Champions Cup; 1987	Succeeded by Al-Ittifaq
