= 2013 AFC Cup group stage =

Football competition in Asia

The group stage of the 2013 AFC Cup was played from 26 February to 1 May 2013. A total of 32 teams competed in the group stage.

== Draw ==
The draw for the group stage was held on 6 December 2012, 15:00 UTC+8, at the AFC House in Kuala Lumpur, Malaysia. The 32 teams were drawn into eight groups of four. Teams from the same association could not be drawn into the same group.

The following 32 teams (16 from West Asia Zone, 16 from East Asia Zone) were entered into the group-stage draw, which included the 31 automatic qualifiers and the qualifying play-off winner, whose identity was not known at the time of the draw:

West Asia Zone (Groups A–D)

- (Bahrain) Al-Riffa
- (Bahrain) Al-Muharraq (later replaced by (Tajikistan) Regar-TadAZ)
- (Iraq) Erbil
- (Iraq) Dohuk
- (Jordan) Al-Faisaly
- (Jordan) Al-Ramtha
- (Kuwait) Al-Qadsia
- Al-Kuwait
- (Lebanon) Safa
- (Lebanon) Al-Ansar
- (Oman) Fanja
- (Oman) Dhofar
- (Syria) Al-Shorta
- (Tajikistan) Ravshan Kulob
- (Yemen) Al-Shaab Ibb
- Winner of play-off: (Yemen) Al-Ahli Taizz

East Asia Zone (Groups E–H)

- (Hong Kong) Kitchee
- (Hong Kong) Sunray Cave JC Sun Hei
- (India) East Bengal
- (India) Churchill Brothers
- (Indonesia) Semen Padang
- (Indonesia) Persibo Bojonegoro
- (Malaysia) Kelantan
- (Malaysia) Selangor
- (Maldives) New Radiant
- (Maldives) Maziya
- (Myanmar) Yangon United
- (Myanmar) Ayeyawady United
- (Singapore) Tampines Rovers
- (Singapore) Warriors
- (Vietnam) SHB Đà Nẵng
- (Vietnam) Sài Gòn Xuân Thành

Al-Muharraq (Bahrain) withdrew after the draw was held. As a result, Regar-TadAZ (Tajikistan), which were initially to enter the qualifying play-off, instead directly entered the group stage, and only two teams participated in the qualifying play-off.

== Format ==
In the group stage, each group was played on a home-and-away round-robin basis. The winners and runners-up of each group advanced to the round of 16.

=== Tiebreakers ===
The teams are ranked according to points (3 points for a win, 1 point for a tie, 0 points for a loss). If tied on points, tiebreakers are applied in the following order:

1. Greater number of points obtained in the group matches between the teams concerned
2. Goal difference resulting from the group matches between the teams concerned
3. Greater number of goals scored in the group matches between the teams concerned (away goals do not apply)
4. Goal difference in all the group matches
5. Greater number of goals scored in all the group matches
6. Penalty shoot-out if only two teams are involved and they are both on the field of play
7. Fewer score calculated according to the number of yellow and red cards received in the group matches (1 point for a single yellow card, 3 points for a red card as a consequence of two yellow cards, 3 points for a direct red card, 4 points for a yellow card followed by a direct red card)
8. Drawing of lots

== Groups ==
The matchdays were 5–6 March, 12–13 March, 2–3 April, 9–10 April, 23–24 April, and 30 April–1 May 2013.

=== Group A ===
Team	Pld	W	D	L	GF	GA	GD	Pts	KUW	RIF	SFA	REG
Al-Kuwait	6	4	0	2	15	6	+9	12		2–3	3–1	5–0
(Bahrain) Al-Riffa	6	3	1	2	9	6	+3	10	0–2		2–0	1–1
(Lebanon) Safa	6	3	1	2	7	8	−1	10	1–0	1–0		1–1
(Tajikistan) Regar-TadAZ	6	0	2	4	5	16	−11	2	1–3	0–3	2–3	

Legend: Blue = home team win; Yellow = draw; Red = away team win.

Tiebreakers

- Al-Riffa are ranked ahead of Safa on head-to-head record.

Team	Pld	W	D	L	GF	GA	GD	Pts
(Bahrain) Al-Riffa	2	1	0	1	2	1	+1	3
(Lebanon) Safa	2	1	0	1	1	2	−1	3

5 March 2013
17:00 UTC+2

Safa (Lebanon)	1–1	(Tajikistan) Regar-TadAZ
Omaier 1'	Report	Saidov 60' (pen.)

Camille Chamoun Sports City Stadium, Beirut
Attendance: 300
Referee: Yaqoob Abdul Baki (Oman)
5 March 2013
18:30 UTC+3

Al-Riffa (Bahrain)	0–2	Al-Kuwait
	Report	Rogerinho 6'; Al Buraiki 89'

Bahrain National Stadium, Riffa
Attendance: 300
Referee: Dmitry Mashentsev (Kyrgyzstan)

12 March 2013
15:00 UTC+5

Regar-TadAZ (Tajikistan)	0–3	(Bahrain) Al-Riffa
	Report	Al Douni 15', 45', 68'

20 Years of Independence Stadium, Khujand
Attendance: 10,000
Referee: Çarymyrat Gurbanow (Turkmenistan)
12 March 2013
19:30 UTC+3

Al-Kuwait	3–1	(Lebanon) Safa
Al Buraiki 13', 52'; Rogerinho 69'	Report	Khan 15'

Al Kuwait Sports Club Stadium, Kuwait City
Attendance: 800
Referee: Mohanad Qasim Eesee Sarray (Iraq)

2 April 2013
15:00 UTC+5

Regar-TadAZ (Tajikistan)	1–3	Al-Kuwait
Rakhmatov 90+4'	Report	Jemâa 17', 58'; Rogerinho 65'

20 Years of Independence Stadium, Khujand
Attendance: 8,000
Referee: Vo Minh Tri (Vietnam)
2 April 2013
17:00 UTC+3

Safa (Lebanon)	1–0	(Bahrain) Al-Riffa
Mansour 45+4' (pen.)	Report

Camille Chamoun Sports City Stadium, Beirut
Attendance: 300
Referee: Pratap Singh (India)

10 April 2013
18:30 UTC+3

Al-Riffa (Bahrain)	2–0	(Lebanon) Safa
Al Douni 30'; Maowas 72'	Report

Bahrain National Stadium, Riffa
Attendance: 200
Referee: Muhammad Taqi Aljaafari Bin Jahari (Singapore)
10 April 2013
18:40 UTC+3

Al-Kuwait	5–0	(Tajikistan) Regar-TadAZ
Jemâa 57', 70'; Rogerinho 75'; Khamis 80'; Hammami 82'	Report

Al Kuwait Sports Club Stadium, Kuwait City
Attendance: 300
Referee: Mohammad Abu Loum (Jordan)

24 April 2013
15:00 UTC+5

Regar-TadAZ (Tajikistan)	2–3	(Lebanon) Safa
Rakhmatov 31'; Khamroqulov 82' (pen.)	Report	Uchee 43'; Omaier 53'; Haidar 90+2'

20 Years of Independence Stadium, Khujand
Attendance: 3,000
Referee: Khamis Al-Marri (Qatar)
24 April 2013
18:45 UTC+3

Al-Kuwait	2–3	(Bahrain) Al-Riffa
Jemâa 13', 34'	Report	Jovančić 23'; Saad 51'; Al Douni 73'

Al Kuwait Sports Club Stadium, Kuwait City
Attendance: 1,000
Referee: Mukhtar Al Yarimi (Yemen)

1 May 2013
17:30 UTC+3

Safa (Lebanon)	1–0	Al-Kuwait
Haidar 53'	Report

Camille Chamoun Sports City Stadium, Beirut
Attendance: 250
Referee: Ali Sabah Adday Al-Qaysi (Iraq)
1 May 2013
17:30 UTC+3

Al-Riffa (Bahrain)	1–1	(Tajikistan) Regar-TadAZ
Al Douni 84'	Report	Eminov 71'

Bahrain National Stadium, Riffa
Attendance: 200
Referee: Yaqoob Abdul Baki (Oman)

=== Group B ===
Team	Pld	W	D	L	GF	GA	GD	Pts	ERB	FAN	ANS	ATA
(Iraq) Erbil	6	6	0	0	17	0	+17	18		1–0	2–0	4–0
(Oman) Fanja	6	3	1	2	9	6	+3	10	0–4		4–0	3–1
(Lebanon) Al-Ansar	6	2	1	3	7	9	−2	7	0–2	0–0		5–1
(Yemen) Al-Ahli Taizz	6	0	0	6	2	20	−18	0	0–4	0–2	0–2	

Legend: Blue = home team win; Yellow = draw; Red = away team win.
5 March 2013
17:00 UTC+3

Erbil (Iraq)	4–0	(Yemen) Al-Ahli Taizz
Salah 43', 90+1'; Bukenya 68'; Radhi 76'	Report

Franso Hariri Stadium, Erbil
Attendance: 12,000
Referee: Khamis Al-Marri (Qatar)
5 March 2013
19:00 UTC+4

Fanja (Oman)	4–0	(Lebanon) Al-Ansar
Cissé 6'; Al-Hinai 54'; Al-Mashari 60'; Gustavo 68'	Report

Sultan Qaboos Sports Complex, Muscat
Attendance: 700
Referee: Saeid Mozaffarizadeh (Iran)

12 March 2013
19:00 UTC+4

Al-Ahli Taizz (Yemen)	0–2	(Oman) Fanja
	Report	Cissé 28'; Al-Mashari 36'

Al-Seeb Stadium, Al-Seeb (Oman)
Attendance: 1,500
Referee: Tayeb Shamsuzzaman (Bangladesh)
12 March 2013
18:00 UTC+2

Al-Ansar (Lebanon)	0–2	(Iraq) Erbil
	Report	Salah 27'; Radhi 59'

Camille Chamoun Sports City Stadium, Beirut
Attendance: 2,500
Referee: Mohammad Abu Loum (Jordan)

3 April 2013
18:00 UTC+3

Al-Ahli Taizz (Yemen)	0–2	(Lebanon) Al-Ansar
	Report	Nasser 64' (o.g.); Khodor 80'

Camille Chamoun Sports City Stadium, Beirut (Lebanon)
Attendance: 750
Referee: Ali Shaban (Kuwait)
3 April 2013
18:00 UTC+3

Erbil (Iraq)	1–0	(Oman) Fanja
Sabah 47'	Report

Franso Hariri Stadium, Erbil
Attendance: 8,000
Referee: Çarymyrat Gurbanow (Turkmenistan)

9 April 2013
18:00 UTC+3

Al-Ansar (Lebanon)	5–1	(Yemen) Al-Ahli Taizz
Khodor 6'; Kojok 22'; El Jounaidi 28'; Sebastião 38' (pen.); Agblexo 77'	Report	Ahmed 45+1'

Camille Chamoun Sports City Stadium, Beirut
Attendance: 2,700
Referee: Jameel Abdulhusin (Bahrain)
9 April 2013
19:15 UTC+4

Fanja (Oman)	0–4	(Iraq) Erbil
	Report	Mohammed 45+1'; Kosorić 54'; Radhi 88', 90+3' (pen.)

Al-Seeb Stadium, Al-Seeb
Attendance: 800
Referee: Wang Di (China PR)

24 April 2013
18:00 UTC+3

Al-Ahli Taizz (Yemen)	0–4	(Iraq) Erbil
	Report	Karim 4'; Miran 60'; Sabah 79'; Bukenya 84'

Franso Hariri Stadium, Erbil (Iraq)
Attendance: 3,000
Referee: Fahad Al-Mirdasi (Saudi Arabia)
24 April 2013
18:00 UTC+3

Al-Ansar (Lebanon)	0–0	(Oman) Fanja
	Report

Camille Chamoun Sports City Stadium, Beirut
Attendance: 7,000
Referee: Dmitriy Mashentsev (Kyrgyzstan)

1 May 2013
18:30 UTC+3

Erbil (Iraq)	2–0	(Lebanon) Al-Ansar
Radhi 59', 86'	Report

Franso Hariri Stadium, Erbil
Attendance: 2,000
Referee: Timur Faizullin (Kyrgyzstan)
1 May 2013
19:30 UTC+4

Fanja (Oman)	3–1	(Yemen) Al-Ahli Taizz
Al-Hinai 52', 53'; Keita 72'	Report	Al Merghmi 21'

Al-Seeb Stadium, Al-Seeb
Attendance: 300
Referee: Fahad Al-Marri (Qatar)

Notes

1. Teams from Yemen were not allowed to host their home matches in their country due to security concerns.

=== Group C ===
Team	Pld	W	D	L	GF	GA	GD	Pts	FAI	DUH	DHO	SIB
(Jordan) Al-Faisaly	6	4	1	1	9	5	+4	13		1–0	2–3	2–1
(Iraq) Dohuk	6	4	0	2	14	6	+8	12	0–1		6–1	2–1
(Oman) Dhofar	6	3	1	2	8	12	−4	10	1–1	1–3		1–0
(Yemen) Al-Shaab Ibb	6	0	0	6	3	11	−8	0	0–2	1–3	0–1	

Legend: Blue = home team win; Yellow = draw; Red = away team win.
6 March 2013
16:00 UTC+3

Al-Shaab Ibb (Yemen)	1–3	(Iraq) Dohuk
Abduljabar 36'	Report	Sadir 33', 78'; Diab 45+1'

Duhok Stadium, Dohuk (Iraq)
Attendance: 6,000
Referee: Ali Sabbagh (Lebanon)
6 March 2013
18:00 UTC+3

Al-Faisaly (Jordan)	2–3	(Oman) Dhofar
Haj Mohamad 58'; Al-Attar 87'	Report	Al-Noufali 4' (pen.); Joël 23', 44'

Amman International Stadium, Amman
Attendance: 2,560
Referee: Abdulla Hassan Mohamed (United Arab Emirates)

13 March 2013
16:00 UTC+3

Dohuk (Iraq)	0–1	(Jordan) Al-Faisaly
	Report	Haj Mohamad 90+2'

Duhok Stadium, Dohuk
Attendance: 14,000
Referee: Dmitry Mashentsev (Kyrgyzstan)
13 March 2013
19:30 UTC+4

Dhofar (Oman)	1–0	(Yemen) Al-Shaab Ibb
Joël 90+3'	Report

Al-Saada Stadium, Salalah
Attendance: 2,500
Referee: Yousef Al-Marzouq (Kuwait)

2 April 2013
18:00 UTC+3

Al-Faisaly (Jordan)	2–1	(Yemen) Al-Shaab Ibb
Bani Attiah 30', 85'	Report	Owoboskini 70'

Amman International Stadium, Amman
Attendance: 500
Referee: Fahad Al-Mirdasi (Saudi Arabia)
2 April 2013
19:30 UTC+4

Dhofar (Oman)	1–3	(Iraq) Dohuk
Al-Dhabit 57'	Report	Sahyouni 7'; Ali 20'; Bahjat 34'

Al-Saada Stadium, Salalah
Attendance: 2,000
Referee: Masoud Tufayelieh (Syria)

10 April 2013
16:30 UTC+3

Dohuk (Iraq)	6–1	(Oman) Dhofar
Abdul-Zahra 1', 18', 48', 90+2'; Sahyouni 50'; Diab 87'	Report	Al-Noobi 42'

Duhok Stadium, Dohuk
Attendance: 5,000
Referee: Fahad Al-Mirdasi (Saudi Arabia)
10 April 2013
18:00 UTC+3

Al-Shaab Ibb (Yemen)	0–2	(Jordan) Al-Faisaly
	Report	Al-Maharmeh 11'; Nu'man 89'

Amman International Stadium, Amman (Jordan)
Attendance: 950
Referee: Masoud Tufayelieh (Syria)

23 April 2013
16:30 UTC+3

Dohuk (Iraq)	2–1	(Yemen) Al-Shaab Ibb
Abdul-Zahra 7'; Abdul-Raheem 14'	Report	Owoboskini 18'

Duhok Stadium, Dohuk
Attendance: 6,500
Referee: Mohd Amirul Izwan Bin Yaacob (Malaysia)
23 April 2013
19:30 UTC+4

Dhofar (Oman)	1–1	(Jordan) Al-Faisaly
Al-Mashari 24'	Report	Al-Attar 58'

Al-Saada Stadium, Salalah
Attendance: 2,000
Referee: Nagor Amir Noor Mohamed (Malaysia)

30 April 2013
18:30 UTC+3

Al-Faisaly (Jordan)	1–0	(Iraq) Dohuk
Al-Attar 29'	Report

Amman International Stadium, Amman
Attendance: 1,200
Referee: Ali Shaban (Kuwait)
30 April 2013
19:30 UTC+4

Al-Shaab Ibb (Yemen)	0–1	(Oman) Dhofar
	Report	Al-Shimli 32'

Al-Saada Stadium, Salalah (Oman)
Attendance: 800
Referee: Dmitriy Mashentsev (Kyrgyzstan)

Notes

2. Teams from Yemen were not allowed to host their home matches in their country due to security concerns.

=== Group D ===
Team	Pld	W	D	L	GF	GA	GD	Pts	QAD	SHO	RAM	RAV
(Kuwait) Al-Qadsia	6	4	1	1	13	4	+9	13		0–1	2–2	3–0
(Syria) Al-Shorta	6	4	0	2	8	5	+3	12	0–2		0–1	2–0
(Jordan) Al-Ramtha	6	3	1	2	10	7	+3	10	0–3	1–2		5–0
(Tajikistan) Ravshan Kulob	6	0	0	6	2	17	−15	0	1–3	1–3	0–1	

Legend: Blue = home team win; Yellow = draw; Red = away team win.
6 March 2013
15:00 UTC+5

Ravshan Kulob (Tajikistan)	0–1	(Jordan) Al-Ramtha
	Report	Al-Laham 68'

20 Years of Independence Stadium, Khujand
Attendance: 13,500
Referee: Vladislav Tseytlin (Uzbekistan)
6 March 2013
18:30 UTC+3

Al-Qadsia (Kuwait)	0–1	(Syria) Al-Shorta
	Report	Al-Sayed 90+5' (pen.)

Mohammed Al-Hamad Stadium, Hawalli
Attendance: 2,000
Referee: Leow Thiam Hoe (Singapore)

13 March 2013
15:00 UTC+3

Al-Shorta (Syria)	2–0	(Tajikistan) Ravshan Kulob
Ghalioum 53'; Habib 58'	Report

Prince Mohammed Stadium, Zarqa (Jordan)
Attendance: 50
Referee: Mukhtar Al Yarimi (Yemen)
13 March 2013
18:00 UTC+3

Al-Ramtha (Jordan)	0–3	(Kuwait) Al-Qadsia
	Report	Neda 2'; Al Sheikh 29'; Al-Mutawa 78'

King Abdullah Stadium, Amman
Attendance: 4,000
Referee: Yaqoob Abdul Baki (Oman)

3 April 2013
17:00 UTC+3

Al-Shorta (Syria)	0–1	(Jordan) Al-Ramtha
	Report	Mangoua 79'

Prince Mohammed Stadium, Zarqa (Jordan)
Attendance: 2,000
Referee: Ali Sabah Al-Qaysi (Iraq)
3 April 2013
18:30 UTC+3

Al-Qadsia (Kuwait)	3–0	(Tajikistan) Ravshan Kulob
Al-Mutawa 26', 88'; Irgashev 68' (o.g.)	Report

Mohammed Al-Hamad Stadium, Hawalli
Attendance: 600
Referee: Ma Ning (China PR)

9 April 2013
15:00 UTC+5

Ravshan Kulob (Tajikistan)	1–3	(Kuwait) Al-Qadsia
Takyi 2'	Report	Al Ansari 20'; Al-Mutawa 44', 58'

20 Years of Independence Stadium, Khujand
Attendance: 4,023
Referee: Khurram Shahzad (Pakistan)
9 April 2013
18:00 UTC+3

Al-Ramtha (Jordan)	1–2	(Syria) Al-Shorta
Kassas 41' (pen.)	Report	Al Wakid 28'; Al Salih 56'

King Abdullah Stadium, Amman
Attendance: 4,000
Referee: Fahad Al-Marri (Qatar)

23 April 2013
17:00 UTC+3

Al-Shorta (Syria)	0–2	(Kuwait) Al-Qadsia
	Report	Al-Mutawa 52'; Al Soma 86'

Prince Mohammed Stadium, Zarqa (Jordan)
Attendance: 100
Referee: Tayeb Shamsuzzaman (Bangladesh)
23 April 2013
18:00 UTC+3

Al-Ramtha (Jordan)	5–0	(Tajikistan) Ravshan Kulob
Mangoua 5'; Al-Laham 30'; Al-Dawud 44'; Kassas 53'; Ouattara 83'	Report

King Abdullah Stadium, Amman
Attendance: 700
Referee: Salah Abbas Alabbasi (Bahrain)

30 April 2013
16:30 UTC+5

Ravshan Kulob (Tajikistan)	1–3	(Syria) Al-Shorta
Tukhtasunov 41'	Report	Al Wakid 14'; Kalasi 28'; Zakour 58'

20 Years of Independence Stadium, Khujand
Attendance: 1,700
Referee: Sukhbir Singh (Singapore)
30 April 2013
15:30 UTC+3

Al-Qadsia (Kuwait)	2–2	(Jordan) Al-Ramtha
Al-Mutawa 29'; Al-Mutairi 34'	Report	Mangoua 61'; Kassas 82'

Mohammed Al-Hamad Stadium, Hawalli
Attendance: 180
Referee: Ammar Al-Jeneibi (United Arab Emirates)

Notes

3. Teams from Syria were not allowed to host their home matches in their country due to security concerns.

=== Group E ===
Team	Pld	W	D	L	GF	GA	GD	Pts	SP	KIT	CHB	WAR
(Indonesia) Semen Padang	6	5	1	0	15	6	+9	16		3–1	3–1	3–1
(Hong Kong) Kitchee	6	4	0	2	18	7	+11	12	1–2		3–0	5–0
(India) Churchill Brothers	6	1	1	4	6	13	−7	4	2–2	0–4		3–0
(Singapore) Warriors	6	1	0	5	4	17	−13	3	0–2	2–4	1–0	

Legend: Blue = home team win; Yellow = draw; Red = away team win.
26 February 2013
20:00 UTC+8

Kitchee (Hong Kong)	3–0	(India) Churchill Brothers
Chu Siu Kei 28'; Jordi 31', 66'	Report

Mong Kok Stadium, Hong Kong
Attendance: 1,851
Referee: Chris Beath (Australia)
5 March 2013
15:30 UTC+7

Semen Padang (Indonesia)	3–1	(Singapore) Warriors
Wilson 19'; Mofu 32'; Iskandar 86'	Report	Inui 41'

Haji Agus Salim Stadium, Padang
Attendance: 9,225
Referee: Ma Ning (China PR)

12 March 2013
15:00 UTC+5:30

Churchill Brothers (India)	2–2	(Indonesia) Semen Padang
Chhetri 27'; Singh 57'	Report	Bayauw 36'; Rizal 44'

Shree Shiv Chhatrapati Sports Complex, Pune
Attendance: 1,500
Referee: Yudai Yamamoto (Japan)
12 March 2013
19:45 UTC+8

Warriors (Singapore)	2–4	(Hong Kong) Kitchee
Inui 23'; Gunawan 29'	Report	Jordi 46', 51'; Lo Kwan Yee 62'; Cheng Siu Wai 75'

Jalan Besar Stadium, Singapore
Attendance: 1,151
Referee: Minoru Tōjō (Japan)

2 April 2013
15:00 UTC+5:30

Churchill Brothers (India)	3–0	(Singapore) Warriors
Vales 37'; Singh 44'; Chhetri 84'	Report

Shree Shiv Chhatrapati Sports Complex, Pune
Attendance: 500
Referee: Yaqoob Abdul Baki (Oman)
2 April 2013
20:00 UTC+8

Kitchee (Hong Kong)	1–2	(Indonesia) Semen Padang
Jordi 83'	Report	Iskandar 4'; Wilson 77'

Mong Kok Stadium, Hong Kong
Attendance: 1,792
Referee: Win Cho (Myanmar)

10 April 2013
15:30 UTC+7

Semen Padang (Indonesia)	3–1	(Hong Kong) Kitchee
Wilson 13', 75'; Iskandar 71'	Report	Jordi 33'

Haji Agus Salim Stadium, Padang
Attendance: 11,315
Referee: Mohd Amirul Izwan Bin Yaacob (Malaysia)
10 April 2013
19:45 UTC+8

Warriors (Singapore)	1–0	(India) Churchill Brothers
Franco 54' (o.g.)	Report

Jalan Besar Stadium, Singapore
Attendance: 1,362
Referee: Win Cho (Myanmar)

24 April 2013
15:00 UTC+5:30

Churchill Brothers (India)	0–4	(Hong Kong) Kitchee
	Report	Couñago 15', 17'; Jordi 57'; Cheng Siu Wai 81'

Shree Shiv Chhatrapati Sports Complex, Pune
Attendance: 400
Referee: Vo Minh Tri (Vietnam)
24 April 2013
19:45 UTC+8

Warriors (Singapore)	0–2	(Indonesia) Semen Padang
	Report	Wilson 39', 60'

Jalan Besar Stadium, Singapore
Attendance: 378
Referee: Hettikamkanamge Perera (Sri Lanka)

1 May 2013
15:30 UTC+7

Semen Padang (Indonesia)	3–1	(India) Churchill Brothers
Wilson 24', 64'; Bonai 47'	Report	Balan 49'

Haji Agus Salim Stadium, Padang
Attendance: 9,072
Referee: Jameel Abdulhusin (Bahrain)
1 May 2013
17:00 UTC+8

Kitchee (Hong Kong)	5–0	(Singapore) Warriors
Jordi 18', 53', 88'; Cheng Siu Wai 62'; Tsang Kam To 72'	Report

Mong Kok Stadium, Hong Kong
Attendance: 1,097
Referee: Ko Hyung-Jin (Korea Republic)

Notes

4. The Kitchee v Churchill Brothers match was rescheduled from the original date of 5 March 2013 due to India's participation in the 2014 AFC Challenge Cup qualification from 2 to 6 March 2013.

=== Group F ===
Team	Pld	W	D	L	GF	GA	GD	Pts	NRA	YAN	SH	PSB
(Maldives) New Radiant	6	5	0	1	20	4	+16	15		3–1	1–0	6–1
(Myanmar) Yangon United	6	5	0	1	18	5	+13	15	2–0		2–0	3–0
(Hong Kong) Sunray Cave JC Sun Hei	6	1	1	4	12	12	0	4	0–3	1–3		8–0
(Indonesia) Persibo Bojonegoro	6	0	1	5	5	34	−29	1	0–7	1–7	3–3	

Legend: Blue = home team win; Yellow = draw; Red = away team win.

Tiebreakers

- New Radiant and Yangon United are tied on head-to-head record, and so are ranked by overall goal difference.

Team	Pld	W	D	L	GF	GA	GD	Pts
(Maldives) New Radiant	2	1	0	1	3	3	0	3
(Myanmar) Yangon United	2	1	0	1	3	3	0	3

26 February 2013
18:00 UTC+6:30

Yangon United (Myanmar)	3–0	(Indonesia) Persibo Bojonegoro
Koné 56', 63', 90+2'	Report

Thuwunna Stadium, Yangon
Attendance: 985
Referee: Jumpei Iida (Japan)
5 March 2013
16:00 UTC+5

New Radiant (Maldives)	1–0	(Hong Kong) Sunray Cave JC Sun Hei
Umair 67'	Report

Galolhu National Stadium, Malé
Attendance: 4,880
Referee: Vo Minh Tri (Vietnam)

12 March 2013
15:00 UTC+7

Persibo Bojonegoro (Indonesia)	0–7	(Maldives) New Radiant
	Report	Umair 11'; Ashfaq 34', 50', 58', 70', 80'; Umar 66'

Manahan Stadium, Surakarta
Attendance: 700
Referee: Hettikamkanamge Perera (Sri Lanka)
12 March 2013
20:00 UTC+8

Sunray Cave JC Sun Hei (Hong Kong)	1–3	(Myanmar) Yangon United
Yeung Chi Lun 20'	Report	Koné 2'; César 53'; Aung Moe 90+7'

Mong Kok Stadium, Hong Kong
Attendance: 736
Referee: Pratap Singh (India)

3 April 2013
15:00 UTC+7

Persibo Bojonegoro (Indonesia)	3–3	(Hong Kong) Sunray Cave JC Sun Hei
James Ha 11' (o.g.); Alcorsé 33', 68'	Report	Leung Tsz Chun 58'; Choi Kwok Wai 70'; Roberto Júnior 90+3'

Manahan Stadium, Surakarta
Attendance: 400
Referee: Nagor Amir Noor Mohamed (Malaysia)
3 April 2013
18:00 UTC+6:30

Yangon United (Myanmar)	2–0	(Maldives) New Radiant
Koné 17'; Aung Moe 19'	Report

Thuwunna Stadium, Yangon
Attendance: 539
Referee: Khurram Shahzad (Pakistan)

9 April 2013
16:00 UTC+5

New Radiant (Maldives)	3–1	(Myanmar) Yangon United
Umair 31'; Fasir 38'; Mansa 45+1'	Report	Koné 89'

Galolhu National Stadium, Malé
Attendance: 5,400
Referee: Yu Ming-hsun (Chinese Taipei)
9 April 2013
20:00 UTC+8

Sunray Cave JC Sun Hei (Hong Kong)	8–0	(Indonesia) Persibo Bojonegoro
Barry 3', 12', 39'; Liang Zicheng 6', 48'; Roberto Júnior 16'; Leung Tsz Chun 31', 37'	Report

Mong Kok Stadium, Hong Kong
Attendance: 463
Referee: Chaiya Mahapab (Thailand)

24 April 2013
15:00 UTC+7

Persibo Bojonegoro (Indonesia)	1–7	(Myanmar) Yangon United
Han Ji-ho 75'	Report	César 4', 54', 58'; Koné 28', 85'; Yan Aung Kyaw 43'; Aung Moe 80'

Manahan Stadium, Surakarta
Attendance: 150
Referee: Fan Qi (China PR)
24 April 2013
20:00 UTC+8

Sunray Cave JC Sun Hei (Hong Kong)	0–3	(Maldives) New Radiant
	Report	Fasir 61', 71'; Umair 86'

Mong Kok Stadium, Hong Kong
Attendance: 477
Referee: Yudai Yamamoto (Japan)

1 May 2013
17:30 UTC+6:30

Yangon United (Myanmar)	2–0	(Hong Kong) Sunray Cave JC Sun Hei
Kyi Lin 69'; Koné 81'	Report

Thuwunna Stadium, Yangon
Attendance: 700
Referee: Mohd Amirul Izwan Bin Yaacob (Malaysia)
1 May 2013
16:00 UTC+5

New Radiant (Maldives)	6–1	(Indonesia) Persibo Bojonegoro
Ashfaq 28', 68', 81' (pen.); Umair 31', 36'; Umar 72'	Report	Chalwa 55'

Galolhu National Stadium, Malé
Attendance: 7,200
Referee: Ma Ning (China PR)

Notes

5. The Yangon United v Persibo Bojonegoro match was rescheduled from the original date of 5 March 2013 due to Myanmar's participation in the 2014 AFC Challenge Cup qualification from 2 to 6 March 2013.
6. The Sunray Cave JC Sun Hei v Persibo Bojonegoro was abandoned in the 65th minute with Sunray Cave JC Sun Hei leading 8–0 after a series of injuries left Persibo Bojonegoro with only six players on the field and below the legal limit. The AFC decided that the result stood according to the regulations of the competition.

=== Group G ===
Team	Pld	W	D	L	GF	GA	GD	Pts	KEL	DN	MAZ	AYE
(Malaysia) Kelantan	6	4	1	1	14	9	+5	13		5–0	1–1	3–1
(Vietnam) SHB Đà Nẵng	6	4	0	2	11	12	−1	12	0–1		3–1	2–1
(Maldives) Maziya	6	2	1	3	13	12	+1	7	6–1	2–3		3–1
(Myanmar) Ayeyawady United	6	1	0	5	9	14	−5	3	1–3	2–3	3–0	

Legend: Blue = home team win; Yellow = draw; Red = away team win.
27 February 2013
16:30 UTC+7

SHB Đà Nẵng (Vietnam)	2–1	(Myanmar) Ayeyawady United
Goia 43'; Merlo 55'	Report	Nay Lin Tun 89'

Chi Lăng Stadium, Da Nang
Attendance: 12,200
Referee: Hettikamkanamge Perera (Sri Lanka)
6 March 2013
20:45 UTC+8

Kelantan (Malaysia)	1–1	(Maldives) Maziya
Badhri 77'	Report	Adhuham 62'

Sultan Mohammad IV Stadium, Kota Bharu
Attendance: 12,000
Referee: Yu Ming-hsun (Chinese Taipei)

13 March 2013
17:00 UTC+6:30

Ayeyawady United (Myanmar)	1–3	(Malaysia) Kelantan
Beršnjak 79'	Report	Badhri 2'; Petratos 53', 80'

Thuwunna Stadium, Yangon
Attendance: 600
Referee: Wang Di (China PR)
13 March 2013
16:00 UTC+5

Maziya (Maldives)	2–3	(Vietnam) SHB Đà Nẵng
Abdulla 33'; Nashid 81'	Report	Mrwanda 54'; Merlo 66'; Nguyễn Minh Phương 90'

Galolhu National Stadium, Malé
Attendance: 3,500
Referee: Ma Ning (China PR)

2 April 2013
16:00 UTC+5

Maziya (Maldives)	3–1	(Myanmar) Ayeyawady United
Shiyam 46'; A. Mohamed 52'; Rasheed 61'	Report	Leandro 47'

Galolhu National Stadium, Malé
Attendance: 2,750
Referee: Ko Hyung-Jin (South Korea)
2 April 2013
20:45 UTC+8

Kelantan (Malaysia)	5–0	(Vietnam) SHB Đà Nẵng
Nwakaeme 4'; Putra 7'; Faiz 23'; Petratos 59'; Badhri 85'	Report

Sultan Mohammad IV Stadium, Kota Bharu
Attendance: 10,000
Referee: Jumpei Iida (Japan)

10 April 2013
16:30 UTC+7

SHB Đà Nẵng (Vietnam)	0–1	(Malaysia) Kelantan
	Report	Nwakaeme 73'

Chi Lăng Stadium, Da Nang
Attendance: 12,700
Referee: Kim Sang-Woo (South Korea)
10 April 2013
17:00 UTC+6:30

Ayeyawady United (Myanmar)	3–0	(Maldives) Maziya
Beršnjak 5'; Leandro 7'; Nay Lin Tun 44'	Report

Thuwunna Stadium, Yangon
Attendance: 100
Referee: Tayeb Shamsuzzaman (Bangladesh)

23 April 2013
17:00 UTC+6:30

Ayeyawady United (Myanmar)	2–3	(Vietnam) SHB Đà Nẵng
Nanda Lin Kyaw Chit 23'; Ōtomo 50'	Report	Huỳnh Quốc Anh 41'; Hà Minh Tuấn 43'; Nguyễn Minh Phương 90+2' (pen.)

Thuwunna Stadium, Yangon
Attendance: 300
Referee: Ng Chiu Kok (Hong Kong)
23 April 2013
16:00 UTC+5

Maziya (Maldives)	6–1	(Malaysia) Kelantan
Rasheed 40'; Abdulla 56'; Easa 77'; Adhuham 82', 85'; Ali 88'	Report	Safwan 7'

Galolhu National Stadium, Malé
Attendance: 2,400
Referee: Ali Sabah Al-Qaysi (Iraq)

30 April 2013
20:00 UTC+8

Kelantan (Malaysia)	3–1	(Myanmar) Ayeyawady United
Petratos 42'; Shahrul 70'; Badhri 83'	Report	Nay Lin Tun 80'

Sultan Mohammad IV Stadium, Kota Bharu
Attendance: 14,200
Referee: Chris Beath (Australia)
30 April 2013
19:00 UTC+7

SHB Đà Nẵng (Vietnam)	3–1	(Maldives) Maziya
Merlo 14', 34', 67'	Report	Adhuham 44'

Chi Lăng Stadium, Da Nang
Attendance: 12,500
Referee: Pratap Singh (India)

Notes

7. The SHB Đà Nẵng v Ayeyawady United match was rescheduled from the original date of 6 March 2013 due to Myanmar's participation in the 2014 AFC Challenge Cup qualification from 2 to 6 March 2013.

=== Group H ===
Team	Pld	W	D	L	GF	GA	GD	Pts	KEB	SEL	SG	TPR
(India) East Bengal	6	4	2	0	13	6	+7	14		1–0	4–1	2–1
(Malaysia) Selangor	6	2	2	2	12	11	+1	8	2–2		3–1	3–3
(Vietnam) Sài Gòn Xuân Thành	6	2	2	2	9	12	−3	8	0–0	2–1		2–2
(Singapore) Tampines Rovers	6	0	2	4	12	17	−5	2	2–4	2–3	2–3	

Source: RSSSF
Legend: Blue = home team win; Yellow = draw; Red = away team win.

Tiebreakers

- Selangor are ranked ahead of Sài Gòn Xuân Thành on head-to-head record.

Team	Pld	W	D	L	GF	GA	GD	Pts
(Malaysia) Selangor	2	1	0	1	4	3	+1	3
(Vietnam) Sài Gòn Xuân Thành	2	1	0	1	3	4	−1	3

27 February 2013
15:00 UTC+5:30

East Bengal (India)	1–0	(Malaysia) Selangor
Ralte 43'	Report

Salt Lake Stadium, Kolkata
Attendance: 3,000
Referee: Tayeb Shamsuzzaman (Bangladesh)
6 March 2013
19:45 UTC+8

Tampines Rovers (Singapore)	2–3	(Vietnam) Sài Gòn Xuân Thành
Amri 89'; Đurić 90+2'	Report	Amougou 22', 62'; Pham Thua Chi 84'

Jalan Besar Stadium, Singapore
Attendance: 1,238
Referee: Ng Chiu Kok (Hong Kong)

13 March 2013
18:30 UTC+7

Sài Gòn Xuân Thành (Vietnam)	0–0	(India) East Bengal
	Report

Thống Nhất Stadium, Ho Chi Minh City
Attendance: 5,000
Referee: Ko Hyung-Jin (Korea Republic)
13 March 2013
20:45 UTC+8

Selangor (Malaysia)	3–3	(Singapore) Tampines Rovers
Doe 8', 54' (pen.); Amri 46'	Report	Đurić 20'; Imran 49'; Yamashita 71'

Shah Alam Stadium, Shah Alam
Attendance: 1,551
Referee: Kim Sang-Woo (Korea Republic)

3 April 2013
18:30 UTC+7

Sài Gòn Xuân Thành (Vietnam)	2–1	(Malaysia) Selangor
Oguwike 45+2', 65'	Report	Doe 64'

Thống Nhất Stadium, Ho Chi Minh City
Attendance: 2,800
Referee: Hettikamkanamge Perera (Sri Lanka)
3 April 2013
19:45 UTC+8

Tampines Rovers (Singapore)	2–4	(India) East Bengal
Hadžibulić 28'; Amri 65'	Report	Hadee 19' (o.g.); Barisic 62', 87'; Edeh 64'

Jalan Besar Stadium, Singapore
Attendance: 1,082
Referee: Chaiya Mahapab (Thailand)

9 April 2013
15:15 UTC+5:30

East Bengal (India)	2–1	(Singapore) Tampines Rovers
Edeh 22'; Ralte 86'	Report	Esah 68'

Salt Lake Stadium, Kolkata
Attendance: 7,000
Referee: Nivon Robesh Gamini (Sri Lanka)
9 April 2013
20:45 UTC+8

Selangor (Malaysia)	3–1	(Vietnam) Sài Gòn Xuân Thành
Kubala 9'; Doe 63'; Amri 72'	Report	Oloya 81'

Shah Alam Stadium, Shah Alam
Attendance: 1,267
Referee: Mohanad Qasim Eesee Sarray (Iraq)

23 April 2013
18:30 UTC+7

Sài Gòn Xuân Thành (Vietnam)	2–2	(Singapore) Tampines Rovers
Amougou 18' (pen.); Oloya 42'	Report	Amri 15'; Hadžibulić 63'

Thống Nhất Stadium, Ho Chi Minh City
Attendance: 2,000
Referee: Wang Di (China PR)
23 April 2013
20:45 UTC+8

Selangor (Malaysia)	2–2	(India) East Bengal
Shukur 79'; Adib 90+3'	Report	Orji 23'; Ralte 54'

Shah Alam Stadium, Shah Alam
Attendance: 1,000
Referee: Ng Kai Lam (Hong Kong)

30 April 2013
19:00 UTC+8

Tampines Rovers (Singapore)	2–3	(Malaysia) Selangor
Asraruddin 50' (o.g.); Đurić 58'	Report	Taha 28' (o.g.); Amri 45', 76'

Jalan Besar Stadium, Singapore
Attendance: 839
Referee: Yudai Yamamoto (Japan)
30 April 2013
16:30 UTC+5:30

East Bengal (India)	4–1	(Vietnam) Sài Gòn Xuân Thành
Edeh 8' (pen.); Barisic 45'; Orji 53', 59'	Report	Amougou 61'

Salt Lake Stadium, Kolkata
Attendance: 2,500
Referee: Fahad Al-Mirdasi (Saudi Arabia)

Notes

8. The East Bengal v Selangor match was rescheduled from the original date of 6 March 2013 due to India's participation in the 2014 AFC Challenge Cup qualification from 2 to 6 March 2013.
