= 2013 AFC Cup knockout stage =

Asian Football Confederation tournament

The knock-out stage of the 2013 AFC Cup was played from 14 May to 2 November 2013. A total of 16 teams competed in the knock-out stage.

== Qualified teams ==
The winners and runners-up of each of the eight groups in the group stage qualified for the knock-out stage. Both West Asia Zone and East Asia Zone had eight teams qualified.

Group	Winners	Runners-up
West Asia Zone (Groups A–D)
A	Al-Kuwait	(Bahrain) Al-Riffa
B	(Iraq) Erbil	(Oman) Fanja
C	(Jordan) Al-Faisaly	(Iraq) Dohuk
D	(Kuwait) Al-Qadsia	(Syria) Al-Shorta
East Asia Zone (Groups E–H)
E	(Indonesia) Semen Padang	(Hong Kong) Kitchee
F	(Maldives) New Radiant	(Myanmar) Yangon United
G	(Malaysia) Kelantan	(Vietnam) SHB Đà Nẵng
H	(India) East Bengal	(Malaysia) Selangor

== Format ==
In the knock-out stage, the 16 teams played a single-elimination tournament. In the quarter-finals and semi-finals, each tie was played on a home-and-away two-legged basis, while in the round of 16 and final, each tie was played as a single match. The away goals rule (for two-legged ties), extra time (away goals do not apply in extra time) and penalty shoot-out were used to decide the winner if necessary.

== Schedule ==
The schedule of each round was as follows.

Round	First leg	Second leg
Round of 16	14–15 May 2013	
Quarter-finals	17 September 2013	24 September 2013
Semi-finals	1 October 2013	22 October 2013
Final	2 November 2013	

== Bracket ==
In the round of 16, the winners of one group played the runners-up of another group in the same zone, with the group winners hosting the match. The matchups were determined as follows:

West Asia Zone

- Winner Group A vs. Runner-up Group C
- Winner Group C vs. Runner-up Group A
- Winner Group B vs. Runner-up Group D
- Winner Group D vs. Runner-up Group B

East Asia Zone

- Winner Group E vs. Runner-up Group G
- Winner Group G vs. Runner-up Group E
- Winner Group F vs. Runner-up Group H
- Winner Group H vs. Runner-up Group F

The draw for the quarter-finals, semi-finals, and final (to decide the host team) was held on 20 June 2013, 15:00 UTC+8, at the AFC House in Kuala Lumpur, Malaysia. In this draw, teams from different zones could play each other, and the "country protection" rule was applied: if there are two teams from the same association, they may not play each other in the quarter-finals.

Round of 16
(Kuwait) Al-Qadsia	4
(Oman) Fanja	0
(Iraq) Erbil	3
(Syria) Al-Shorta (a.e.t.)	4
(Malaysia) Kelantan	0
(Hong Kong) Kitchee	2
(Jordan) Al-Faisaly	3
(Bahrain) Al-Riffa	1
(Maldives) New Radiant (a.e.t.)	2
(Malaysia) Selangor	0
Al-Kuwait (p)	1 (4)
(Iraq) Dohuk	1 (1)
(India) East Bengal	5
(Myanmar) Yangon United	1
(Indonesia) Semen Padang	2
(Vietnam) SHB Đà Nẵng	1

Quarter-finals
(Kuwait) Al-Qadsia (a)	0	2	2
(Syria) Al-Shorta	0	2	2
(Hong Kong) Kitchee	1	1	2
(Jordan) Al-Faisaly	2	2	4
(Maldives) New Radiant	2	0	2
Al-Kuwait	7	5	12
(India) East Bengal	1	1	2
(Indonesia) Semen Padang	0	1	1

Semi-finals
(Kuwait) Al-Qadsia	2	1	3
(Jordan) Al-Faisaly	1	0	1
Al-Kuwait	4	3	7
(India) East Bengal	2	0	2

Final
(Kuwait) Al-Qadsia	0
Al-Kuwait	2

== Round of 16 ==
The matches were played on 14 and 15 May 2013.

Team 1	Score	Team 2
West Asia Zone
Al-Kuwait	1–1 (a.e.t.) (4–1 p)	(Iraq) Dohuk
Al-Faisaly (Jordan)	3–1	(Bahrain) Al-Riffa
Erbil (Iraq)	3–4 (a.e.t.)	(Syria) Al-Shorta
Al-Qadsia (Kuwait)	4–0	(Oman) Fanja
East Asia Zone
Semen Padang (Indonesia)	2–1	(Vietnam) SHB Đà Nẵng
Kelantan (Malaysia)	0–2	(Hong Kong) Kitchee
New Radiant (Maldives)	2–0 (a.e.t.)	(Malaysia) Selangor
East Bengal (India)	5–1	(Myanmar) Yangon United

14 May 2013
16:00 UTC+7

Semen Padang (Indonesia)	2–1	(Vietnam) SHB Đà Nẵng
Wilson 45+3' (pen.); Mofu 90+2'	Report	Merlo 31'

Haji Agus Salim Stadium, Padang
Attendance: 11,932
Referee: Ryuji Sato (Japan)

14 May 2013
20:45 UTC+8

Kelantan (Malaysia)	0–2	(Hong Kong) Kitchee
	Report	Kcira 15' (o.g.); Jordi 45+1'

Sultan Mohammad IV Stadium, Kota Bharu
Attendance: 15,000
Referee: Lee Min-Hu (South Korea)

14 May 2013
19:00 UTC+3

Al-Faisaly (Jordan)	3–1	(Bahrain) Al-Riffa
Bani Attiah 44'; Nu'man 82', 85'	Report	Isa 88'

Amman International Stadium, Amman
Attendance: 2,500
Referee: Banjar Al-Dosari (Qatar)

14 May 2013
19:10 UTC+3

Al-Kuwait	1–1 (a.e.t.)	(Iraq) Dohuk
Hammami 24' (pen.)	Report	Sadir 53'
Penalties
Hammami (penalty scored); Al Ateeqi (penalty scored); Awadh (penalty scored); Baba (penalty scored)	4–1	(penalty scored) Abdul-Zahra; (penalty missed) Diab; (penalty missed) Sahyouni

Al Kuwait Sports Club Stadium, Kuwait City
Attendance: 500
Referee: Vladislav Tseytlin (Uzbekistan)

15 May 2013
16:00 UTC+5

New Radiant (Maldives)	2–0 (a.e.t.)	(Malaysia) Selangor
Niyaz 97'; Fasir 105'	Report

Galolhu National Stadium, Malé
Attendance: 8,600
Referee: Strebre Delovski (Australia)

15 May 2013
18:00 UTC+5:30

East Bengal (India)	5–1	(Myanmar) Yangon United
Orji 2'; Edeh 25', 72', 77'; Hossain 48'	Report	César 79'

Salt Lake Stadium, Kolkata
Attendance: 8,000
Referee: Minoru Tōjō (Japan)

15 May 2013
18:45 UTC+3

Al-Qadsia (Kuwait)	4–0	(Oman) Fanja
Neda 3'; Al Soma 15'; Al-Mutawa 34', 90+1'	Report

Al-Sadaqua Walsalam Stadium, Kuwait City
Attendance: 1,000
Referee: Abdulla Hassan Mohamed (United Arab Emirates)

15 May 2013
19:00 UTC+3

Erbil (Iraq)	3–4 (a.e.t.)	(Syria) Al-Shorta
Sabagh 5'; Radhi 36'; Al Salih 112' (o.g.)	Report	Dakka 23' (pen.); Jafal 67'; Abadi 103'; Al-Sayed 106'

Franso Hariri Stadium, Erbil
Attendance: 12,000
Referee: Marai Al Awaji (Saudi Arabia)

== Quarter-finals ==
The first legs were played on 17 September 2013, and the second legs were played on 24 September 2013.

Team 1	Agg.	Team 2	1st leg	2nd leg
Al-Qadsia (Kuwait)	2–2 (a)	(Syria) Al-Shorta	0–0	2–2
Kitchee (Hong Kong)	2–4	(Jordan) Al-Faisaly	1–2	1–2
New Radiant (Maldives)	2–12	Al-Kuwait	2–7	0–5
East Bengal (India)	2–1	(Indonesia) Semen Padang	1–0	1–1

=== First leg ===
17 September 2013
16:00 UTC+5

New Radiant (Maldives)	2–7	Al-Kuwait
Fasir 55'; Ashfaq 68'	Report	Rogerinho 2'; Hammami 15', 83' (pen.); Jemâa 21', 29', 35', 45'

Galolhu National Stadium, Malé
Attendance: 8,600
Referee: Mohsen Torky (Iran)

17 September 2013
16:30 UTC+5:30

East Bengal (India)	1–0	(Indonesia) Semen Padang
Sueoka 70'	Report

Salt Lake Stadium, Kolkata
Attendance: 30,000
Referee: Jumpei Iida (Japan)

17 September 2013
20:00 UTC+8

Kitchee (Hong Kong)	1–2	(Jordan) Al-Faisaly
Akande 46'	Report	Túlio Souza 20'; Al-Nawateer 59'

Mong Kok Stadium, Hong Kong
Attendance: 3,049
Referee: Kim Sang-Woo (South Korea)

17 September 2013
19:40 UTC+3

Al-Qadsia (Kuwait)	0–0	(Syria) Al-Shorta
	Report

Al-Sadaqua Walsalam Stadium, Kuwait City
Attendance: 1,959
Referee: Abdullah Al Hilali (Oman)

=== Second leg ===
24 September 2013
15:00 UTC+7

Semen Padang (Indonesia)	1–1	(India) East Bengal
Wilson 23'	Report	Moga 78'

Haji Agus Salim Stadium, Padang
Attendance: 11,350
Referee: Marai Al Awaji (Saudi Arabia)

East Bengal won 2–1 on aggregate.

24 September 2013
19:00 UTC+3

Al-Shorta (Syria)	2–2	(Kuwait) Al-Qadsia
Al Douni 68'; Tussi 80'	Report	Neda 17', 22' (pen.)

Camille Chamoun Sports City Stadium, Beirut (Lebanon)
Attendance: 20
Referee: Alireza Faghani (Iran)

2–2 on aggregate. Al-Qadsia won on away goals.

24 September 2013
19:00 UTC+3

Al-Faisaly (Jordan)	2–1	(Hong Kong) Kitchee
Al-Khawaldeh 18'; Júnior 42'	Report	Jordi 54'

Amman International Stadium, Amman
Attendance: 4,000
Referee: Banjar Al-Dosari (Qatar)

Al-Faisaly won 4–2 on aggregate.

24 September 2013
19:30 UTC+3

Al-Kuwait	5–0	(Maldives) New Radiant
Al Buraiki 21'; Jemâa 29', 40' (pen.), 44'; Al Kandari 69'	Report

Al Kuwait Sports Club Stadium, Kuwait City
Attendance: 230
Referee: Abdulla Hassan Mohamed (United Arab Emirates)

Al-Kuwait won 12–2 on aggregate.

Notes

1. Teams from Syria were not allowed to host their home matches in their country due to security concerns.

== Semi-finals ==
The first legs were played on 1 and 2 October 2013, and the second legs were played on 22 October 2013.

Team 1	Agg.	Team 2	1st leg	2nd leg
Al-Qadsia (Kuwait)	3–1	(Jordan) Al-Faisaly	2–1	1–0
Al-Kuwait	7–2	(India) East Bengal	4–2	3–0

=== First leg ===
1 October 2013
19:30 UTC+3

Al-Kuwait	4–2	(India) East Bengal
Jemâa 17', 33'; Ali 32'; Hammami 48'	Report	Okpara 65'; Ralte 87'

Al Kuwait Sports Club Stadium, Kuwait City
Attendance: 1,000
Referee: Tan Hai (China PR)

2 October 2013
19:30 UTC+3

Al-Qadsia (Kuwait)	2–1	(Jordan) Al-Faisaly
Al Qahtani 38'; Neda 77'	Report	Rodrigo 82'

Al-Sadaqua Walsalam Stadium, Kuwait City
Attendance: 2,100
Referee: Valentin Kovalenko (Uzbekistan)

Notes

2. The Al-Qadsia v Al-Faisaly match was rescheduled from the original date of 1 October 2013 to "promote and maximise the broadcasting coverage of both the AFC Cup semi-final matches being played by Kuwaiti clubs".

=== Second leg ===
22 October 2013
16:00 UTC+5:30

East Bengal (India)	0–3	Al-Kuwait
	Report	Rogerinho 43'; Khamis 44'; Das 87' (o.g.)

Salt Lake Stadium, Kolkata
Attendance: 50,000
Referee: Strebre Delovski (Australia)

Al-Kuwait won 7–2 on aggregate.

22 October 2013
19:00 UTC+3

Al-Faisaly (Jordan)	0–1	(Kuwait) Al-Qadsia
	Report	Al Sheikh 77'

Amman International Stadium, Amman
Attendance: 5,000
Referee: Minoru Tōjō (Japan)

Al-Qadsia won 3–1 on aggregate.

== Final ==
The final was played on 2 November 2013.

Team 1	Score	Team 2
Al-Qadsia (Kuwait)	0–2	Al-Kuwait

2 November 2013
19:00 UTC+3

Al-Qadsia (Kuwait)	0–2	Al-Kuwait
	Report	Rogerinho 52'; Jemâa 64'

Al-Sadaqua Walsalam Stadium, Kuwait City
Attendance: 10,000
Referee: Abdul Malik Abdul Bashir (Singapore)
