= 2013 AFC Cup final =

- Event: 2013 AFC Cup
Al-Qadsia	Al-Kuwait
(Kuwait)	(Kuwait)
0	2
- Date: 2 November 2013
- Venue: Al-Sadaqua Walsalam Stadium, Kuwait City
- Man of the Match: Rogerinho
- Referee: Abdul Malik Abdul Bashir (Singapore)
- Attendance: 10,000

The 2013 AFC Cup final was the final of the 2013 AFC Cup, the 10th edition of the AFC Cup, a football competition organized by the Asian Football Confederation (AFC) for clubs from "developing countries" in Asia.

The final was contested as a single match between two Kuwaiti teams, Al-Qadsia and Al-Kuwait. The match was hosted by Al-Qadsia at the Al-Sadaqua Walsalam Stadium in Kuwait City on 2 November 2013.

Defending champions Al-Kuwait defeated Al-Qadsia 2–0 to claim their third AFC Cup title in five years, and became the first team to win the AFC Cup three times. Both finalists also qualified for the 2014 AFC Champions League.

== Venue ==
The Al-Sadaqua Walsalam Stadium, also known as the Peace and Friendship Stadium, is located at Kuwait City and holds 21,500 people.

This was the third AFC Cup final held in Kuwait. The 2009 AFC Cup Final was hosted by Al-Kuwait at the Al Kuwait Sports Club Stadium, while the 2010 AFC Cup Final was hosted by Al-Qadsia at the Jaber Al-Ahmad International Stadium.

== Background ==
Al-Kuwait were the defending champions, and had played in three previous finals, winning twice in 2009 and 2012 and losing in 2011, while Al-Qadsia had lost their only previous final in 2010. In fact, since 2009 when Kuwaiti clubs first entered the AFC Cup, this was the fifth straight single-match finals that featured either Al-Kuwait or Al-Qadsia.

The two teams also met in the round of 16 of the 2011 AFC Cup and 2012 AFC Cup, with Al-Kuwait eliminating Al-Qadsia both times on penalties.

== Road to final ==
Note: In all results below, the score of the finalist is given first.

(Kuwait) Al-Qadsia				Round	Al-Kuwait			
Bye				Qualifying play-off	Bye			
Opponent	Result			Group stage	Opponent	Result		
(Syria) Al-Shorta	0–1 (H)			Matchday 1	(Bahrain) Al-Riffa	2–0 (A)		
(Jordan) Al-Ramtha	3–0 (A)			Matchday 2	(Lebanon) Safa	3–1 (H)		
(Tajikistan) Ravshan Kulob	3–0 (H)			Matchday 3	(Tajikistan) Regar-TadAZ	3–1 (A)		
(Tajikistan) Ravshan Kulob	3–1 (A)			Matchday 4	(Tajikistan) Regar-TadAZ	5–0 (H)		
(Syria) Al-Shorta	2–0 (A)			Matchday 5	(Bahrain) Al-Riffa	2–3 (H)		
(Jordan) Al-Ramtha	2–2 (H)			Matchday 6	(Lebanon) Safa	0–1 (A)		
Group D winner: Team / Pld / W / D / L / GF / GA / GD / Pts; (Kuwait) Al-Qadsia / 6 / 4 / 1 / 1 / 13 / 4 / +9 / 13; (Syria) Al-Shorta / 6 / 4 / 0 / 2 / 8 / 5 / +3 / 12; (Jordan) Al-Ramtha / 6 / 3 / 1 / 2 / 10 / 7 / +3 / 10; (Tajikistan) Ravshan Kulob / 6 / 0 / 0 / 6 / 2 / 17 / −15 / 0; Source:				Final standings	Group A winner: Team / Pld / W / D / L / GF / GA / GD / Pts; Al-Kuwait / 6 / 4 / 0 / 2 / 15 / 6 / +9 / 12; (Bahrain) Al-Riffa / 6 / 3 / 1 / 2 / 9 / 6 / +3 / 10; (Lebanon) Safa / 6 / 3 / 1 / 2 / 7 / 8 / −1 / 10; (Tajikistan) Regar-TadAZ / 6 / 0 / 2 / 4 / 5 / 16 / −11 / 2; Source:			
Opponent	Agg.	1st leg	2nd leg	Knock-out stage	Opponent	Agg.	1st leg	2nd leg
(Oman) Fanja	4–0 (H) (single match)			Round of 16	(Iraq) Dohuk	1–1 (a.e.t.) (4–1p) (H) (single match)		
(Syria) Al-Shorta	2–2 (a)	0–0 (H)	2–2 (A)	Quarterfinals	(Maldives) New Radiant	12–2	7–2 (A)	5–0 (H)
(Jordan) Al-Faisaly	3–1	2–1 (H)	1–0 (A)	Semifinals	(India) East Bengal	7–2	4–2 (H)	3–0 (A)

== Rules ==
The final was played as a single match, with the host team decided by draw. If tied after regulation, extra time and, if necessary, penalty shoot-out were used to decide the winner.

== Match ==
2 November 2013
19:00 UTC+3

Al-Qadsia (Kuwait)	0–2	Al-Kuwait
	Report	Rogerinho 52'; Jemâa 64'

Al-Sadaqua Walsalam Stadium, Kuwait City
Attendance: 10,000
Referee: Abdul Malik Abdul Bashir (Singapore)

Al-Qadsia	Al-Kuwait

GK	22	(Kuwait) Nawaf Al Khaldi
DF	2	(Kuwait) Khalid El Ebrahim
DF	13	(Kuwait) Musaed Neda	(yellow card) 59'	(substituted off) 85'
DF	18	(Kuwait) Amer Al Fadhel
DF	46	(Kuwait) Khaled Al Qahtani	(yellow card) 86'
MF	5	(Ivory Coast) Ibrahima Keita
MF	8	(Kuwait) Saleh Al Sheikh (c)
MF	14	(Kuwait) Talal Al Amer		(substituted off) 63'
MF	19	(Kuwait) Nawaf Al-Mutairi		(substituted off) 71'
FW	10	(Syria) Omar Al Soma
FW	42	(Kuwait) Saif Al Hashan
Substitutes
GK	23	(Kuwait) Ahmed Al Fahdli
DF	37	(Kuwait) Abdulrahman Al Enezi
MF	11	(Kuwait) Fahad Al Ansari
FW	7	(Kuwait) Hamad Aman	(yellow card) 82'	(substituted on) 63'
FW	27	(Kuwait) Hamad Al Enezi		(substituted on) 71'
FW	34	(Kuwait) Ahmad Al Dhefiri		(substituted on) 85'
FW	45	(Brazil) Michel Simplício
Manager
(Kuwait) Mohammed Ibrahem

GK	1	(Kuwait) Musab Al Kanderi
DF	2	(Kuwait) Yaqoub Al Taher	(yellow card) 36'
DF	3	(Kuwait) Fahad Awadh	(yellow card) 73'
DF	18	(Kuwait) Jarah Al Ateeqi (c)		(substituted off) 78'
DF	19	(Bahrain) Hussain Ali Baba		(substituted off) 58'
MF	20	(Kuwait) Hussain Hakem
MF	33	(Kuwait) Fahad Hamoud
FW	10	(Brazil) Rogério
FW	13	(Tunisia) Chadi Hammami
FW	15	(Kuwait) Waleed Ali
FW	17	(Tunisia) Issam Jemâa		(substituted off) 65'
Substitutes
GK	22	(Kuwait) Bader Al Azmi
MF	8	(Kuwait) Abdullah Al Buraiki		(substituted on) 65'
MF	14	(Kuwait) Abdullah Al Dhafeeri
MF	31	(Kuwait) Sami Al Sanea		(substituted on) 78'
FW	11	(Kuwait) Ali Al Kandari
FW	16	(Kuwait) Khaled Al Azemi
MF	37	(Kuwait) Shereedah Al Shereedah		(substituted on) 58'
Manager
(Romania) Marin Ion

AFC Man of the Match:
(Brazil) Rogerinho (Al-Kuwait)

Assistant referees:
Tang Yew Mun (Singapore)
Jeffrey Goh Gek Pheng (Singapore)
Fourth official:
Muhammad Taqi (Singapore)
