= 2012–13 Duhok SC season =

Duhok
2012–13 season
- Chairman: Ahmed Saeed
- Manager: Fajr Ibrahim
- Iraqi Premier League: 5th
- 2012–13 Iraq FA Cup: TBD
- AFC Cup: Round of 16
Home colours	Away colours

The 2012–13 Iraq football season is Duhok FC's eleventh consecutive season in the Premier League. The club will be participating in the AFC cup, and also competing in the League Cup and the FA Cup. The league's format has changed once again this season, following the switch from a two-group format to a traditional league last season. A total of 18 teams are contesting the league, two fewer than last season. As a result of this, the bottom four teams in the 2011-12 season were relegated but only two were promoted from the Iraqi First Division League. These two promoted teams were Naft Al-Janoob and Sulaymaniya. The winner and the runner-up qualify to the 2014 AFC Cup. However unlike previous seasons, the 3rd place this season will not take part in the next UAFA Cup that because the spot is reserved for the 2012–13 Iraq FA Cup champions. 4 teams will be relegated to Iraqi First Division League and 2 teams will be promoted for next season 2013–14

== Kit providers ==
- LIG

== Clubs season-progress ==
Team ╲ Round	1	2	3	4	5	6	7	8	9	10	11	12	13	14	15	16	17	18	19	20	21	22	23	24	25	26	27	28	29	30	31	32	33	34
Duhok	W	W	W	D	W	D	W	D	L	W	D	L	D	D	W	W	D	W	W	L	L	L	W	L	W	D	W	L	W	L	W	D	W	

Source: Soccerway
W = Win; D = Draw; L = Loss

== 2013 AFC Cup ==
=== Group C ===
Team	Pld	W	D	L	GF	GA	GD	Pts	FAI	DUH	DHO	SIB
(Jordan) Al-Faisaly	6	4	1	1	9	5	+4	13		1–0	2–3	2–1
(Iraq) Dohuk	6	4	0	2	14	6	+8	12	0–1		6–1	2–1
(Oman) Dhofar	6	3	1	2	8	12	−4	10	1–1	1–3		1–0
(Yemen) Al-Shaab Ibb	6	0	0	6	3	11	−8	0	0–2	1–3	0–1	

Legend: Blue = home team win; Yellow = draw; Red = away team win.

== Current squad ==
Note: Flags indicate national team as defined under FIFA eligibility rules; some limited exceptions apply. Players may hold more than one non-FIFA nationality.

No.	Pos.	Nation	Player
1	GK	IRQ	Haidar Raad
2	DF	IRQ	Faysal jassim
3	DF	IRQ	Ali Bahjat
4	DF	SYR	Ali Diab
5	DF	IRQ	Hassan Zaboon
6	MF	SYR	Burhan Sahyouni
7	MF	IRQ	Salih Sadir
8	DF	IRQ	Khalid Mushir (captain)
9	FW	BRA	Oliveira
10	FW	IRQ	Jassim Suliman
11	MF	IRQ	Azad ahmed
12	GK	IRQ	Alaa Gatea
13	MF	IRQ	Amjad Waleed
14	FW	IRQ	Mohannad Abdul-Raheem
15	MF	IRQ	Ahmad jabir

No.	Pos.	Nation	Player
16	FW	IRQ	Ali Jawad
17	FW	IRQ	Alaa Abdul-Zahra
18	DF	IRQ	Adnan Attiya
19	FW	IRQ	Seif Kadhim
20	DF	IRQ	Jassim Muhammad Haji (vice-captain)
21	GK	IRQ	Uday Taleb
22	MF	IRQ	Usamah Ali
23	MF	IRQ	Amad Ismail
24	MF	IRQ	Wissam Zaki
25	MF	IRQ	Saif Salman
26	MF	IRQ	Nijarvan Shukri
27	MF	IRQ	Bayar Abubakir
28	MF	IRQ	Bezjar Abdelwahed
32	MF	IRQ	Murad Kurdi
—	MF	IRQ	Ayoob Ayad

=== Top scorers ===
Position	Nation	Number	Name	League	FA Cup	AFC cup	Total
FW	(Iraq)	17	Alaa Abdul-Zahra	20	0	5	25
FW	(Iraq)	14	Mohannad Abdul-Raheem	9	0	1	10
MF	(Iraq)	7	Salih Sadir	4	0	3	7
FW	(Brazil)	9	Jailton Nascimento de Oliveira	6	0	0	6
MF	(Syria)	6	Burhan Sahyouni	3	0	2	5
DF	(Syria)	4	Ali Diab	1	0	2	3
MF	(Iraq)	24	Wissam Zaki	3	0	0	3
DF	(Iraq)	19	Seif Kadhim	2	0	0	2
MF	(Iraq)	25	Saif Salman	1	0	0	1
MF	(Iraq)	11	Azad Ahmed	2	0	0	2
MF	(Iraq)	8	Khalid Mushir	1	0	0	1
FW	(Iraq)	10	Jassim Mohammed Suliman	1	0	0	1
FW	(Iraq)	3	Ali Bahjat	0	0	1	1
FW	(Iraq)	22	Usamah Ali	0	0	1	1
			Totals	49	6	14	69
