= Tussi =

- Gilson Tussi (born 1984), Brazilian footballer
- Tussi, or tusi, a recreational drug
