= 1994–95 Yemeni League =

Yemeni League
- Season: 1994–95
- Dates: 13 April 1994 – 30 September 1995
- Champions: Al-Wehda Sana'a
- Relegated: Al-Tali'aa Taizz; Al-Shurta

Statistics of the Yemeni League in the 1994–95 season. It was the season when three points for a win was introduced into the league.

== Results ==
| Pos | Team | Pld | W | D | L | GF | GA | GD | Pts | Relegation |
|---|---|---|---|---|---|---|---|---|---|---|
| 1 | Al-Wehda Sana'a (C) | 22 | 16 | 2 | 4 | 41 | 24 | +17 | 50 | |
| 2 | Al-Ahli Sana'a | 22 | 15 | 3 | 4 | 34 | 14 | +20 | 48 | |
| 3 | Hassan Abyan | 22 | 14 | 3 | 5 | 46 | 16 | +30 | 45 | |
| 4 | Al-Tilal | 22 | 12 | 3 | 7 | 38 | 25 | +13 | 39 | |
| 5 | Al-Wehda Aden | 22 | 10 | 3 | 9 | 28 | 29 | −1 | 33 | |
| 6 | Al-Shula | 22 | 9 | 5 | 8 | 34 | 25 | +9 | 32 | |
| 7 | Al-Zohra | 22 | 8 | 4 | 10 | 23 | 28 | −5 | 28 | |
| 8 | Shamsan | 22 | 7 | 4 | 11 | 39 | 50 | −11 | 25 | |
| 9 | Al-Ahli Hudayda | 22 | 5 | 7 | 10 | 22 | 34 | −12 | 22 | |
| 10 | Al-Shaab Hadramaut | 22 | 4 | 9 | 9 | 19 | 28 | −9 | 21 | |
| 11 | Al-Tali'aa Taizz (R) | 22 | 4 | 3 | 15 | 24 | 50 | −26 | 15 | Relegated |
| 12 | Al-Shurta Aden (R) | 22 | 3 | 4 | 15 | 24 | 49 | −25 | 13 | Relegated |

Source: RSSSF
(C) Champions; (R) Relegated

== Top scorers ==
| Rank | Player | Club | Goals |
|---|---|---|---|
| 1 | (Yemen) Jiab Bashafaay | Hassan Abyan | 25 |
| 2 | Isam Driban | Al-Ahli Sana'a | 22 |
| 3 | Abdullah Al-Ninoh | Shamsan | 14 |
| 3 | Asaad Muhammad Abdu | Al-Tali'aa Taizz | 14 |

Source: RSSSF
