= Sahyouni =

Sahyouni (Arabic: صهيوني, romanized: Ṣihyūnī or Ṣahyūnī), also transliterated as Sahyuni, Sahyounie, Sehyouni or Souhyouni, is literally the Arabic equivalent term for Zionist.

Historically simply translating as 'from Zion' (صهيون, Ṣihyūn/Ṣahyūn), it is also an Arabic surname without political connotations, and may be carried by Arab Christian or Muslim families without any ethnic Jewish origins. The name probably originated in Latakia, Syria, designating the people living in the area around Sahyun Castle.

Notable people with the surname include:

- Burhan Sahyouni (born 1986), Syrian football player
- Daniel Sahyounie (born 1994), Australian comedian and musician
- Jibrail as-Sahyuni or Gabriel Sionita (1577–1648), Maronite and translator Arabic scholar
- Salim Sahyouni, Lebanese Protestant Evangelical minister
