= 2000–01 Yemeni League =

Yemeni League
- Season: 2000–01

Statistics of the Yemeni League in the 2000–01 season.

== Final table ==
| Pos | Team | Pld | W | D | L | GF | GA | GD | Pts |
|---|---|---|---|---|---|---|---|---|---|
| 1 | Al-Tilal Aden | 14 | 6 | 8 | 0 | 18 | 10 | +8 | 26 |
| 2 | Al-Wahda Sana | 13 | 7 | 3 | 3 | 22 | 16 | +6 | 24 |
| 3 | Al-Sha'ab Sana | 13 | 6 | 5 | 2 | 18 | 12 | +6 | 23 |
| 4 | Al-Saqr Taizz | 12 | 6 | 5 | 1 | 14 | 8 | +6 | 23 |
| 5 | Al-Ahli Sana | 10 | 6 | 4 | 0 | 20 | 4 | +16 | 22 |
| 6 | Al-Sha'ab Ibb | 10 | 6 | 2 | 2 | 12 | 7 | +5 | 20 |
| 7 | Shabab Al-Jeel Hudayda | 14 | 6 | 2 | 6 | 20 | 22 | −2 | 20 |
| 8 | Al-Tali'aa Taizz | 14 | 4 | 7 | 3 | 11 | 12 | −1 | 19 |
| 9 | Al-Hilal Hudayda | 14 | 3 | 8 | 3 | 15 | 16 | −1 | 17 |
| 10 | Al-Sha'ab Hadramaut | 14 | 4 | 5 | 5 | 13 | 14 | −1 | 17 |
| 11 | Al-Ahli Hudayda | 14 | 3 | 5 | 6 | 18 | 21 | −3 | 14 |
| 12 | Hassan Abyan | 14 | 3 | 5 | 6 | 11 | 17 | −6 | 14 |
| 13 | Al-Ittihad Ibb | 14 | 3 | 4 | 7 | 10 | 15 | −5 | 13 |
| 14 | Al-Wahda Aden | 14 | 3 | 4 | 7 | 11 | 18 | −7 | 13 |
| 15 | Al-Shoala Aden | 15 | 2 | 5 | 8 | 11 | 19 | −8 | 11 |
| 16 | Al-Zohra Sana | 15 | 1 | 4 | 10 | 15 | 28 | −13 | 7 |

Source: rsssf.com
