= 7th GCC Club Championship =

1989 GCC Club Championship
Tournament details
- Dates: 2–18 August 1989
- Teams: 5 (from AFC/UAFA confederations)

Final positions
- Champions: Al-Fanja (1st title)
- Runners-up: Muharraq Club

The 7th GCC Club Championship (Arabic: بطولة الأنديـة الخليجية أبطال الدوري) was the seventh edition of the GCC Club Championship for clubs of the Gulf Cooperation Council nations, held in 1989.

The tournament doubled up as the qualifying round of the 1989–90 Asian Club Championship. The winners would progress to the ACC's latter stages.

Al-Fanja won the tournament, but as in previous years, they did not apply to play in the Asian Club Championship through the GCC tournament and thus had to play further qualifying matches.

== Results ==
Pos	Team	Pld	W	D	L	GF	GA	GD	Pts	Qualification
1	(Kuwait) Al-Arabi	4	2	1	1	8	6	+2	5	Qualify to 1989–90 Asian Club Championship
2	(Bahrain) Muharraq (H)	4	2	1	1	6	4	+2	5	Qualify to 1989–90 Asian Club Championship
3	(Oman) Fanja (Note: Fanja SC only played for the GCC Tournament.)	4	2	1	1	6	4	+2	5	
4	(United Arab Emirates) Al-Wasl	4	2	0	2	4	6	−2	4	
5	(Saudi Arabia) Al-Hilal	4	0	1	3	4	8	−4	1	

(H) Hosts
Notes:

All matches were played in Bahrain

7 August 1989

Al-Arabi (Kuwait)	1–2	(Bahrain) Muharraq

8 August 1989

Al-Wasl (United Arab Emirates)	1–0	(Saudi Arabia) Al-Hilal

9 August 1989

Al-Arabi (Kuwait)	1–1	(Oman) Fanja

10 August 1989

Muharraq (Bahrain)	1–2	(United Arab Emirates) Al-Wasl

11 August 1989

Fanja (Oman)	2–1	(Saudi Arabia) Al-Hilal

14 August 1989

Al Arabi (Kuwait)	2–1	(United Arab Emirates) Al-Wasl

15 August 1989

Muharraq (Bahrain)	2–0	(Oman) Fanja

16 August 1989

Al-Arabi (Kuwait)	4–2	(Saudi Arabia) Al-Hilal

17 August 1989

Fanja (Oman)	3–0	(United Arab Emirates) Al Wasl

18 August 1989

Muharraq (Bahrain)	1–1	(Saudi Arabia) Al-Hilal

Asian Cup group stage playoff

20 August 1989

Muharraq (Bahrain)	1–0	(Kuwait) Al Arabi

Final

August 22, 1989	Muharraq	1–1; 2–4 (pen.)	Fanja

== Winner ==
GCC Club Championship
1989 Winners

Al-Fanja
1st Title
