= 2013 AFC Cup =

10th edition of AFC Cup

Tournament details
- Dates: 9 February – 2 November 2013
- Teams: 34 (from 17 associations)

Final positions
- Champions: Al-Kuwait (3rd title)
- Runners-up: (Kuwait) Al-Qadsia

Tournament statistics
- Matches played: 118
- Goals scored: 409 (3.47 per match)
- Attendance: 504,544 (4,276 per match)
- Top scorer: (Tunisia) Issam Jemâa (16 goals)
- Best player: (Kuwait) Bader Al-Mutawa

The 2013 AFC Cup was the tenth edition of the AFC Cup, a football competition organized by the Asian Football Confederation (AFC) for clubs from "developing countries" in Asia.

In an all-Kuwait final, defending champions Al-Kuwait defeated Al-Qadsia 2–0 to win their third AFC Cup title in five years, becoming the first team to win the AFC Cup three times. Both finalists also qualified for the 2014 AFC Champions League.

== Association team allocation ==
The AFC laid out the procedure for deciding the participating associations and the allocation of slots, with the final decision to be made by the AFC in November 2012. The following changes to the list of participating associations may be made from the 2012 AFC Cup if the AFC approved the following applications made by any association:

- An association originally participating in the AFC Cup may apply to participate in the 2013 AFC Champions League. An association may participate in both the AFC Champions League and the AFC Cup if it only partially fulfills the AFC Champions League criteria.
- An association originally participating in the AFC President's Cup may apply to participate in the 2013 AFC Cup.

The following changes in the participating associations were made compared to the previous year:

- Losers of the AFC Champions League qualifying play-off did not participate in the AFC Cup.
- Tajikistan clubs' participation was upgraded from the AFC President's Cup to the AFC Cup starting from 2013 by the AFC.

Each participating association was given two entries:

- Team 1 (league champions) of each association directly entered the group stage.
- Team 2 (cup winners or league runners-up) of each association either directly entered the group stage or entered the qualifying play-off, depending on the evaluation by the AFC.

West Asia Zone
Member Association	Slots	
Member Association	Group stage	Play-off
Bahrain	2	0
Iraq	2	0
Jordan	2	0
Kuwait	2	0
Lebanon	2	0
Oman	2	0
Syria	1	1
Tajikistan	1	1
Yemen	1	1
Total	15	3

East Asia Zone
Member Association	Slots	
Member Association	Group stage	Play-off
Hong Kong	2	0
India	2	0
Indonesia	2	0
Malaysia	2	0
Maldives	2	0
Myanmar	2	0
Singapore	2	0
Vietnam	2	0
Total	16	0

== Teams ==
The following teams entered the competition.

West Asia Zone
Team	Qualifying method	App	Last App
Group stage direct entrants (Groups A–D)
(Bahrain) Al-Riffa	2011–12 Bahrain First Division League champions	2nd	2010
(Bahrain) Al-Muharraq	2012 Bahraini King's Cup winners	5th	2009
(Iraq) Erbil	2011–12 Iraqi Elite League champions	4th	2012
(Iraq) Dohuk	2011–12 Iraqi Elite League runners-up	2nd	2011
(Jordan) Al-Faisaly	2011–12 Jordan League champions and 2011–12 Jordan FA Cup winners	7th	2012
(Jordan) Al-Ramtha	2011–12 Jordan League runners-up	1st	none
(Kuwait) Al-Qadsia	2011–12 Kuwaiti Premier League champions and 2011–12 Kuwait Emir Cup winners	4th	2012
Al-Kuwait	2011–12 Kuwaiti Premier League runners-up	5th	2012
(Lebanon) Safa	2011–12 Lebanese Premier League champions	4th	2012
(Lebanon) Al-Ansar	2011–12 Lebanese FA Cup winners	4th	2011
(Oman) Fanja	2011–12 Oman Elite League champions	1st	none
(Oman) Dhofar	2011 Sultan Qaboos Cup winners	3rd	2007
(Syria) Al-Shorta	2011–12 Syrian Premier League champions	2nd	2012
(Tajikistan) Ravshan Kulob	2012 Tajik League champions	1st	none
(Yemen) Al-Shaab Ibb	2011–12 Yemeni League champions	2nd	2004
Qualifying play-off participants
(Syria) Al-Wahda	2012 Syrian Cup winners	2nd	2004
(Tajikistan) Regar-TadAZ	2012 Tajik Cup winners	1st	none
(Yemen) Al-Ahli Taizz	2012 Yemeni President Cup winners	1st	none

East Asia Zone
Team	Qualifying method	App	Last App
Group stage direct entrants (Groups E–H)
(Hong Kong) Kitchee	2011–12 Hong Kong First Division League champions	3rd	2012
(Hong Kong) Sunray Cave JC Sun Hei	2011–12 Hong Kong Senior Challenge Shield winners	4th	2007
(India) East Bengal	2011–12 I-League runners-up 2012 Indian Federation Cup winners	7th	2012
(India) Churchill Brothers	2011–12 I-League 3rd place	2nd	2010
(Indonesia) Semen Padang	2011–12 Indonesian Premier League champions	1st	none
(Indonesia) Persibo Bojonegoro	2012 Piala Indonesia winners	1st	none
(Malaysia) Kelantan	2012 Malaysia Super League champions and 2012 Malaysia FA Cup winners	2nd	2012
(Malaysia) Selangor	2012 Malaysia Super League 3rd place	3rd	2010
(Maldives) New Radiant	2012 Dhivehi League champions	5th	2008
(Maldives) Maziya	2012 Maldives FA Cup winners	1st	none
(Myanmar) Yangon United	2012 Myanmar National League champions	2nd	2012
(Myanmar) Ayeyawady United	2012 MFF Cup winners	2nd	2012
(Singapore) Tampines Rovers	2012 S.League champions	6th	2012
Warriors (formerly Singapore Armed Forces)	2012 Singapore Cup winners	3rd	2008
(Vietnam) SHB Đà Nẵng	2012 V-League champions	2nd	2010
(Vietnam) Sài Gòn Xuân Thành	2012 Vietnamese Cup winners	1st	none

Al-Muharraq (Bahrain) withdrew after the draw was held. As a result, Regar-TadAZ (Tajikistan), which were initially to enter the qualifying play-off, instead directly entered the group stage, and only two teams participated in the qualifying play-off.

Notes

1. India (IND): Dempo, the 2011–12 I-League champions, refused to enter the 2013 AFC Cup, so they were replaced by Churchill Brothers, the 2011–12 I-League 3rd place.
2. Malaysia (MAS): Although Selangor only finished third in the 2012 Malaysia Super League, they were awarded the second AFC Cup spot by virtue of the league runners-up being LionsXII, a side managed by the Football Association of Singapore, and thus ineligible to represent Malaysia in continental competition.
Location of teams of the 2013 AFC Cup.
West Asia Zone
East Asia Zone
(q) Qualifying play-off participants

== Schedule ==
The schedule of the competition was as follows (all draws held at AFC headquarters in Kuala Lumpur, Malaysia).

Phase	Round	Draw date	First leg	Second leg
Qualifying play-off	Round 1	6 December 2012	9 February 2013	
Group stage	Matchday 1	6 December 2012	5–6 March 2013	
Group stage	Matchday 2	6 December 2012	12–13 March 2013	
Group stage	Matchday 3	6 December 2012	2–3 April 2013	
Group stage	Matchday 4	6 December 2012	9–10 April 2013	
Group stage	Matchday 5	6 December 2012	23–24 April 2013	
Group stage	Matchday 6	6 December 2012	30 April–1 May 2013	
Knock-out stage	Round of 16	6 December 2012	14–15 May 2013	
Knock-out stage	Quarter-finals	20 June 2013	17 September 2013	24 September 2013
Knock-out stage	Semi-finals	20 June 2013	1 October 2013	22 October 2013
Knock-out stage	Final	20 June 2013	2 November 2013	

For 2013, the round of 16 continued to be played as a single match instead of over two legs on a home-and-away basis as originally planned.

== Qualifying play-off ==
The draw for the qualifying play-off was held on 6 December 2012. Each tie was played as a single match, with extra time and penalty shoot-out used to decide the winner if necessary. The winner advanced to the group stage to join the 31 automatic qualifiers.

Due to the withdrawal of Al-Muharraq after the draw was held, Regar-TadAZ, which were initially drawn to play the winner between Al-Wahda and Al-Ahli Taizz for a place in the group stage, were directly entered into Group A, while the winner between Al-Wahda and Al-Ahli Taizz would be entered into Group B to replace Al-Muharraq.

Team 1	Score	Team 2
Al-Wahda (Syria)	3–5	(Yemen) Al-Ahli Taizz

== Group stage ==
The draw for the group stage was held on 6 December 2012. The 32 teams were drawn into eight groups of four. Teams from the same association could not be drawn into the same group. Each group was played on a home-and-away round-robin basis. The winners and runners-up of each group advanced to the round of 16.

Tiebreakers

The teams are ranked according to points (3 points for a win, 1 point for a tie, 0 points for a loss). If tied on points, tiebreakers are applied in the following order:

1. Greater number of points obtained in the group matches between the teams concerned
2. Goal difference resulting from the group matches between the teams concerned
3. Greater number of goals scored in the group matches between the teams concerned (away goals do not apply)
4. Goal difference in all the group matches
5. Greater number of goals scored in all the group matches
6. Penalty shoot-out if only two teams are involved and they are both on the field of play
7. Fewer score calculated according to the number of yellow and red cards received in the group matches (1 point for a single yellow card, 3 points for a red card as a consequence of two yellow cards, 3 points for a direct red card, 4 points for a yellow card followed by a direct red card)
8. Drawing of lots

=== Group A ===
Team	Pld	W	D	L	GF	GA	GD	Pts	KUW	RIF	SFA	REG
Al-Kuwait	6	4	0	2	15	6	+9	12		2–3	3–1	5–0
(Bahrain) Al-Riffa	6	3	1	2	9	6	+3	10	0–2		2–0	1–1
(Lebanon) Safa	6	3	1	2	7	8	−1	10	1–0	1–0		1–1
(Tajikistan) Regar-TadAZ	6	0	2	4	5	16	−11	2	1–3	0–3	2–3	

Legend: Blue = home team win; Yellow = draw; Red = away team win.

Tiebreakers

- Al-Riffa are ranked ahead of Safa on head-to-head record.

=== Group B ===
Team	Pld	W	D	L	GF	GA	GD	Pts	ERB	FAN	ANS	ATA
(Iraq) Erbil	6	6	0	0	17	0	+17	18		1–0	2–0	4–0
(Oman) Fanja	6	3	1	2	9	6	+3	10	0–4		4–0	3–1
(Lebanon) Al-Ansar	6	2	1	3	7	9	−2	7	0–2	0–0		5–1
(Yemen) Al-Ahli Taizz	6	0	0	6	2	20	−18	0	0–4	0–2	0–2	

Legend: Blue = home team win; Yellow = draw; Red = away team win.

=== Group C ===
Team	Pld	W	D	L	GF	GA	GD	Pts	FAI	DUH	DHO	SIB
(Jordan) Al-Faisaly	6	4	1	1	9	5	+4	13		1–0	2–3	2–1
(Iraq) Dohuk	6	4	0	2	14	6	+8	12	0–1		6–1	2–1
(Oman) Dhofar	6	3	1	2	8	12	−4	10	1–1	1–3		1–0
(Yemen) Al-Shaab Ibb	6	0	0	6	3	11	−8	0	0–2	1–3	0–1	

Legend: Blue = home team win; Yellow = draw; Red = away team win.

=== Group D ===
Team	Pld	W	D	L	GF	GA	GD	Pts	QAD	SHO	RAM	RAV
(Kuwait) Al-Qadsia	6	4	1	1	13	4	+9	13		0–1	2–2	3–0
(Syria) Al-Shorta	6	4	0	2	8	5	+3	12	0–2		0–1	2–0
(Jordan) Al-Ramtha	6	3	1	2	10	7	+3	10	0–3	1–2		5–0
(Tajikistan) Ravshan Kulob	6	0	0	6	2	17	−15	0	1–3	1–3	0–1	

Legend: Blue = home team win; Yellow = draw; Red = away team win.

=== Group E ===
Team	Pld	W	D	L	GF	GA	GD	Pts	SP	KIT	CHB	WAR
(Indonesia) Semen Padang	6	5	1	0	15	6	+9	16		3–1	3–1	3–1
(Hong Kong) Kitchee	6	4	0	2	18	7	+11	12	1–2		3–0	5–0
(India) Churchill Brothers	6	1	1	4	6	13	−7	4	2–2	0–4		3–0
(Singapore) Warriors	6	1	0	5	4	17	−13	3	0–2	2–4	1–0	

Legend: Blue = home team win; Yellow = draw; Red = away team win.

=== Group F ===
Team	Pld	W	D	L	GF	GA	GD	Pts	NRA	YAN	SH	PSB
(Maldives) New Radiant	6	5	0	1	20	4	+16	15		3–1	1–0	6–1
(Myanmar) Yangon United	6	5	0	1	18	5	+13	15	2–0		2–0	3–0
(Hong Kong) Sunray Cave JC Sun Hei	6	1	1	4	12	12	0	4	0–3	1–3		8–0
(Indonesia) Persibo Bojonegoro	6	0	1	5	5	34	−29	1	0–7	1–7	3–3	

Legend: Blue = home team win; Yellow = draw; Red = away team win.

Tiebreakers

- New Radiant and Yangon United are tied on head-to-head record, and so are ranked by overall goal difference.

=== Group G ===
Team	Pld	W	D	L	GF	GA	GD	Pts	KEL	DN	MAZ	AYE
(Malaysia) Kelantan	6	4	1	1	14	9	+5	13		5–0	1–1	3–1
(Vietnam) SHB Đà Nẵng	6	4	0	2	11	12	−1	12	0–1		3–1	2–1
(Maldives) Maziya	6	2	1	3	13	12	+1	7	6–1	2–3		3–1
(Myanmar) Ayeyawady United	6	1	0	5	9	14	−5	3	1–3	2–3	3–0	

Legend: Blue = home team win; Yellow = draw; Red = away team win.

=== Group H ===
Team	Pld	W	D	L	GF	GA	GD	Pts	KEB	SEL	SG	TPR
(India) East Bengal	6	4	2	0	13	6	+7	14		1–0	4–1	2–1
(Malaysia) Selangor	6	2	2	2	12	11	+1	8	2–2		3–1	3–3
(Vietnam) Sài Gòn Xuân Thành	6	2	2	2	9	12	−3	8	0–0	2–1		2–2
(Singapore) Tampines Rovers	6	0	2	4	12	17	−5	2	2–4	2–3	2–3	

Source: RSSSF
Legend: Blue = home team win; Yellow = draw; Red = away team win.

Tiebreakers

- Selangor are ranked ahead of Sài Gòn Xuân Thành on head-to-head record.

== Knock-out stage ==
In the knock-out stage, the 16 teams played a single-elimination tournament. In the quarter-finals and semi-finals, each tie was played on a home-and-away two-legged basis, while in the round of 16 and final, each tie was played as a single match. The away goals rule (for two-legged ties), extra time (away goals do not apply in extra time) and penalty shoot-out were used to decide the winner if necessary.

=== Bracket ===
Round of 16
(Kuwait) Al-Qadsia	4
(Oman) Fanja	0
(Iraq) Erbil	3
(Syria) Al-Shorta (a.e.t.)	4
(Malaysia) Kelantan	0
(Hong Kong) Kitchee	2
(Jordan) Al-Faisaly	3
(Bahrain) Al-Riffa	1
(Maldives) New Radiant (a.e.t.)	2
(Malaysia) Selangor	0
Al-Kuwait (p)	1 (4)
(Iraq) Dohuk	1 (1)
(India) East Bengal	5
(Myanmar) Yangon United	1
(Indonesia) Semen Padang	2
(Vietnam) SHB Đà Nẵng	1

Quarter-finals
(Kuwait) Al-Qadsia (a)	0	2	2
(Syria) Al-Shorta	0	2	2
(Hong Kong) Kitchee	1	1	2
(Jordan) Al-Faisaly	2	2	4
(Maldives) New Radiant	2	0	2
Al-Kuwait	7	5	12
(India) East Bengal	1	1	2
(Indonesia) Semen Padang	0	1	1

Semi-finals
(Kuwait) Al-Qadsia	2	1	3
(Jordan) Al-Faisaly	1	0	1
Al-Kuwait	4	3	7
(India) East Bengal	2	0	2

Final
(Kuwait) Al-Qadsia	0
Al-Kuwait	2

=== Round of 16 ===
In the round of 16, the winners of one group played the runners-up of another group in the same zone, with the group winners hosting the match.

Team 1	Score	Team 2
West Asia Zone
Al-Kuwait	1–1 (a.e.t.) (4–1 p)	(Iraq) Dohuk
Al-Faisaly (Jordan)	3–1	(Bahrain) Al-Riffa
Erbil (Iraq)	3–4 (a.e.t.)	(Syria) Al-Shorta
Al-Qadsia (Kuwait)	4–0	(Oman) Fanja
East Asia Zone
Semen Padang (Indonesia)	2–1	(Vietnam) SHB Đà Nẵng
Kelantan (Malaysia)	0–2	(Hong Kong) Kitchee
New Radiant (Maldives)	2–0 (a.e.t.)	(Malaysia) Selangor
East Bengal (India)	5–1	(Myanmar) Yangon United

=== Quarter-finals ===
The draw for the quarter-finals, semi-finals, and final (to decide the host team) was held on 20 June 2013. In this draw, teams from different zones could play each other, and the "country protection" rule was applied: if there are two teams from the same association, they may not play each other in the quarter-finals.

Team 1	Agg.	Team 2	1st leg	2nd leg
Al-Qadsia (Kuwait)	2–2 (a)	(Syria) Al-Shorta	0–0	2–2
Kitchee (Hong Kong)	2–4	(Jordan) Al-Faisaly	1–2	1–2
New Radiant (Maldives)	2–12	Al-Kuwait	2–7	0–5
East Bengal (India)	2–1	(Indonesia) Semen Padang	1–0	1–1

=== Semi-finals ===
Team 1	Agg.	Team 2	1st leg	2nd leg
Al-Qadsia (Kuwait)	3–1	(Jordan) Al-Faisaly	2–1	1–0
Al-Kuwait	7–2	(India) East Bengal	4–2	3–0

=== Final ===
2 November 2013
19:00 UTC+3

Al-Qadsia (Kuwait)	0–2	Al-Kuwait
	Report	Rogerinho 52'; Jemâa 64'

Al-Sadaqua Walsalam Stadium, Kuwait City
Attendance: 10,000
Referee: Abdul Malik Abdul Bashir (Singapore)

== Awards ==
Award	Player	Team
Most Valuable Player	(Kuwait) Bader Al-Mutawa	(Kuwait) Al-Qadsia
Top Goalscorer	(Tunisia) Issam Jemâa	Al-Kuwait

== Top scorers ==
Rank	Player	Team	MD1	MD2	MD3	MD4	MD5	MD6	R16	QF1	QF2	SF1	SF2	F	Total
1	(Tunisia) Issam Jemâa	Al-Kuwait			2	2	2			4	3	2		1	16
2	(Spain) Jordi Tarrés	(Hong Kong) Kitchee	2	2	1	1	1	3	1		1				12
3	(Liberia) Edward Wilson	(Indonesia) Semen Padang	1		1	2	2	2	1		1				10
4	(Kuwait) Bader Al-Mutawa	(Kuwait) Al-Qadsia		1	2	2	1	1	2						9
4	(Maldives) Ali Ashfaq	(Maldives) New Radiant		5				3		1					9
4	(Ivory Coast) Adama Koné	(Myanmar) Yangon United	3	1	1	1	2	1							9
7	(Syria) Ahmad Al Douni	(Bahrain) Al-Riffa (GS+R16) (Syria) Al-Shorta (QF)		3		1	1	1			1				7
7	(Iraq) Amjad Radhi	(Iraq) Erbil	1	1		2		2	1						7
7	(Brazil) Rogerinho	Al-Kuwait	1	1	1	1				1			1	1	7
10	(Nigeria) Chidi Edeh	(India) East Bengal			1	1		1	3						6
10	(Argentina) Gastón Merlo	(Vietnam) SHB Đà Nẵng	1	1				3	1						6
10	(Maldives) Mohamed Umair	(Maldives) New Radiant	1	1		1	1	2							6

Note: Goals scored in qualifying play-off not counted.

== See also ==
- 2013 AFC Champions League
- 2013 AFC President's Cup
