= Abdullah Al-Qasabi =

Omani footballer (born 1986)

Personal information
- Full name: Abdullah Mohammed Hamed Al-Qasabi
- Date of birth: 28 April 1986 (age 40)
- Place of birth: Oman
- Position: Defender

Team information
- Current team: Fanja

Senior career*
Years	Team	Apps	(Gls)
2012–	Fanja		

International career
2011–2012	Oman	3	(0)
- * Club domestic league appearances and goals

Abdullah Mohammed Al-Qasabi (Arabic: عبد الله محمد حامد القصبي; born 28 April 1986), commonly known as Abdullah Al-Qasabi, is an Omani footballer who plays for Fanja SC in Oman Professional League.

== Club career statistics ==
Club	Season	Division	League		Cup		Continental (Note: Includes appearances in the AFC Cup)		Other		Total	
Club	Season	Division	Apps	Goals	Apps	Goals	Apps	Goals	Apps	Goals	Apps	Goals
Fanja	2011–12	Oman Elite League	-	2	-	0	0	0	-	0	-	2
Fanja	2012–13	Oman Elite League	-	1	-	0	6	0	-	0	-	1
Fanja	Total		-	3	-	0	6	0	-	0	-	3
Career total			-	3	-	0	6	0	-	0	-	3

== International career ==
Abdullah was selected for the national team for the first time in 2012. He made his first appearance for Oman on 8 November 2012 in a friendly match against Estonia. He has represented the national team in the 2014 FIFA World Cup qualification.

== Honours ==
=== Club ===
- With Fanja

- Oman Professional League (0): Runner-up 2012-13, 2013-14
- Sultan Qaboos Cup (1): 2013-14
- Oman Professional League Cup (1): 2014-15
- Oman Super Cup (1): 2012, Runners-up 2013, 2014
