= Hamyar Nasser Al-Ismaili =

Omani footballer and businessman

Hamyar Nasser Al Ismaily
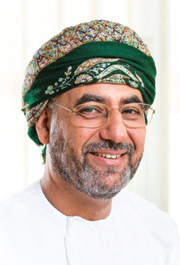
- Born: 17 October 1953 (age 71)
- Occupation: Chairman of Overseas Group President of Fanja SC

Hamyar Nasser Al-Ismaili (Arabic: حمير ناصر الاسماعيلي) born 17 October 1953 is an Omani businessman and former football player.

== Business career ==
He is the chairman of Overseas Group an investment consultant firm in Sultanate of Oman. Hamyar is also the president of Fanja Sport Club in Oman, he was appointed club president three times; once from 1997 to 2000, and again from 2005 until his resignation in 2013 and now from December 2018 .

== Football career ==
Hamyar is a former Omani footballer who represented the Oman national football team as a defender from 1978 to 1979. He is the current president of Fanja SC. He was appointed club president three times; once from 1997 to 2000, and again from 2005 until his resignation in 2013 and December 2018.

== See also ==
- Fanja SC
