= 1999–2000 Yemeni League =

Yemeni League
- Season: 1999–2000
- Champions: Al-Ahli Sana'a
- Matches: 112
- Goals: 293 (2.62 per match)

Statistics of the Yemeni League in the 1999–00 season.

Al-Ahli Sana'a won the title after beating Al-Tali'aa Taizz 6–3 on aggregate in the championship final.

== Results ==
=== Group 1 ===
Pos	Team	Pld	W	D	L	GF	GA	GD	Pts
1	Al-Ahli Sana	14	9	3	2	31	12	+19	30
2	Al-Tali'aa Taizz	14	7	3	4	19	17	+2	24
3	Al-Ittihad Ibb	14	6	3	5	19	14	+5	21
4	Al-Shoala Aden	14	6	3	5	20	18	+2	21
5	Al-Zohra Sana	14	5	5	4	16	15	+1	20
6	Al-Wahda Aden	14	3	4	7	14	20	−6	13
7	Al-Sha'ab Sana	14	3	4	7	8	16	−8	13
8	Shamsan Aden	14	3	3	8	13	28	−15	12

Source: RSSSF

=== Group 2 ===
Pos	Team	Pld	W	D	L	GF	GA	GD	Pts
1	Al-Sha'ab Hadramaut	14	10	2	2	25	9	+16	32
2	Al-Wahda Sana	14	8	3	3	26	14	+12	27
3	Al-Saqr Taizz	14	6	5	3	16	10	+6	23
4	Al-Sha'ab Ibb	14	7	2	5	15	17	−2	23
5	Al-Tilal Aden	14	7	1	6	21	17	+4	22
6	Al-Ahli Hudayda	14	5	3	6	14	18	−4	18
7	Hassan Abyan	14	2	5	7	10	19	−9	11
8	Al-Sharara Lahaj	14	0	1	13	5	28	−23	1

Source: RSSSF

=== Playoffs ===
==== Semifinals ====
First Legs [Apr 21]

- Al-Ahli Sana 1-1 Al-Wahda Sana

[Apr 22]

- Al-Tali'aa Taizz 0-0 Sha'ab M

Second Legs [Apr 28]

- Al-Wahda Sana 1-2 Al-Ahli Sana
- Sha'ab M 1-2 Al-Tali'aa Taizz

==== Third-place match ====
First Leg [May 5]

- Sha'ab M 1-0 Al-Wahda Sana

Second Leg [May 11]

- Al-Wahda Sana 3-0 Sha'ab M

==== Championship final ====
First Leg [May 5]

- Al-Tali'aa Taizz 2-1 Al-Ahli Sana

Second Leg [May 11]

- Al-Ahli Sana 5-1 Al-Tali'aa Taizz
