= Jean-Paul Késsé Amangoua =

Ivorian footballer

Personal information
- Full name: Jean-Paul Othniel Kessé Amangoua
- Date of birth: 15 December 1984 (age 41)
- Place of birth: Arrah, Ivory Coast
- Height: 1.70 m (5 ft 7 in)
- Position: Forward

Youth career
- JCAT

Senior career*
Years	Team	Apps	(Gls)
2005–2007	JCAT		
2007–2015	ASEC Mimosas		
2015–2016	Dubai	25	(10)
2016	Al-Shahania		
2016–2017	Al-Ramtha SC		
2017–2020	Al-Shahania	62	(12)
2020	Umm Salal	3	(0)
2020–2021	Al-Markhiya	10	(2)
2021	Al Jeel	21	(3)

International career
2007	Ivory Coast U23		
2009-2011	Ivory Coast A	6	(1)
- * Club domestic league appearances and goals

Jean-Paul Othniel Kessé Amangoua (born 15 December 1984) is an Ivorian footballer.

== Career ==
Amangoua started his football career with Jeunesse Club d'Abidjan and joined in June 2008 ASEC Mimosas.

== International career ==
He represented his country at the 2007 UEMOA Tournament in Burkina Faso and was nominated for the African Nations Championship 2009 in Zambia.
