= 2013 AFC Cup qualifying play-off =

Association football competition

The qualifying play-off of the 2013 AFC Cup was played on 9 February 2013, to decide one of the 32 places in the group stage.

== Draw ==
The draw for the qualifying play-off was held on 6 December 2012, 15:00 UTC+8, at the AFC House in Kuala Lumpur, Malaysia.

The following three teams (all from West Asia Zone) were entered into the qualifying play-off draw:

- (Syria) Al-Wahda
- (Tajikistan) Regar-TadAZ
- (Yemen) Al-Ahli Taizz

Due to the withdrawal of Al-Muharraq after the draw was held, Regar-TadAZ, which were initially drawn to play the winner between Al-Wahda and Al-Ahli Taizz for a place in the group stage, were directly entered into Group A, while the winner between Al-Wahda and Al-Ahli Taizz would be entered into Group B to replace Al-Muharraq.

== Format ==
Each tie was played as a single match, with extra time and penalty shoot-out used to decide the winner if necessary. The winner advanced to the group stage to join the 31 automatic qualifiers.

== Match ==
Team 1	Score	Team 2
Al-Wahda (Syria)	3–5	(Yemen) Al-Ahli Taizz

9 February 2013
14:00 UTC+3

Al-Wahda (Syria)	3–5	(Yemen) Al-Ahli Taizz
Khribin 18', 90+1'; Al-Haj 86'	Report	Aref 7'; Al-Hubaishi 31' (pen.), 78'; Mahdi 55' (pen.); Dongue 81'

Prince Mohammed Stadium, Zarqa (Jordan)
Attendance: 150
Referee: Saeid Mozaffarizadeh (Iran)

Notes

1. Teams from Syria were not allowed to host their home matches in their country due to security concerns.
