= Abdul Malik Abdul Bashir =

Singaporean association football referee

Abdul Malik
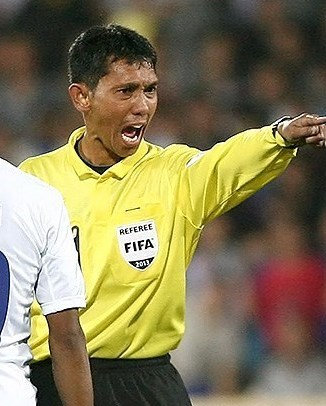
- Abdul Malik officiating the match between Esteghlal and Al Hilal on 9 April 2013 during the 2013 AFC Champions League match
- Full name: Abdul Malik Abdul Bashir
- Born: 11 January 1968 (age 58); Singapore

Abdul Malik Abdul Bashir (born 11 January 1968) also known as Abdul Malik, is a Singaporean association football referee. He refereed in the 2011 AFC Asian Cup, the first leg of the 2008 AFC Champions League Final. and 2013 AFC Cup Final

== Refereeing career ==
=== 2008 AFC Champions League Final ===
Abdul Malik was selected to official the 2008 AFC Champions League Final between Japanese club, Gamba Osaka and Australia club, Adelaide United which saw the Gamba Osaka winning the first leg 3–0.

=== 2011 AFC Asian Cup ===
Abdul Malik has officiated the match in the 2011 AFC Asian Cup group stage match between Qatar and Kuwait which saw Qatar winning 3–0. He then officiated the match between Uzbekistan and Jordan in the quarter-finals seeing Uzbekistan advanced to the semi-finals. On 28 January 2011, he was then in charge of the Third place playoff between Uzbekistan and South Korea which saw South Korea winning the bronze medal.

=== 2013 AFC Cup Final ===
Abdul Malik was selected to officiate the final of the 2013 AFC Cup between both Kuwait club, Al-Qadsia and Al-Kuwait where Al-Kuwait won 0–2.

== Notable matches ==
2011 AFC Asian Cup – Qatar
Date	Match	Venue	Round
16 January 2011	Qatar – Kuwait	Al Rayyan	Group stage
21 January 2011	Uzbekistan – Jordan	Al Rayyan	Quarter-finals
28 January 2011	Uzbekistan – South Korea	Al Rayyan	Third place playoff

Other notable matches
Date	Match	Venue	Tournament
23 May 2019	(Japan) Gamba Osaka – (Australia) Adelaide United	Osaka	2008 AFC Champions League Final First leg
7 August 2013	(Japan) Kashima Antlers – (Brazil) São Paulo	Kashima	2013 J.League Cup / Copa Sudamericana Championship
2 November 2013	Al-Qadsia – Al-Kuwait	Kuwait City	2013 AFC Cup Final

== Honours ==
- ASEAN Football Federation Referee Of The Year: 2013

Preceded by (Uzbekistan) Valentin Kovalenko	AFC Cup final match referees 2013 (Singapore) Abdul Malik Abdul Bashir	Succeeded by (South Korea) Kim Dong Jin
