= Seif Kadhim =

Swedish footballer

Personal information
- Full name: Seif Kadhim Husayn
- Date of birth: 7 February 1991 (age 35)
- Place of birth: Kiruna, Sweden
- Height: 1.76 m (5 ft 9 in)
- Position: Midfielder

Team information
- Current team: Assyriska IK
- Number: 19

Youth career
- Ersboda SK

Senior career*
Years	Team	Apps	(Gls)
2006–2007	Ersboda SK		
2008–2011	Örgryte IS	2	(0)
2010	→ Norrby IF (loan)	9	(4)
2011	Syrianska IF Kerburan	10	(1)
2011–2012	Umeå FC	22	(3)
2012–2013	Duhok SC		(1)
2014	Tegs SK		
2015–2017	Team TG FF	42	(3)
2018–2019	Umeå FC	53	(8)
2020–	Assyriska IK	5	(1)

International career
2008	Sweden U19	2	(0)
- * Club domestic league appearances and goals as of Assyriska IK

Seif Kadhim Husayn (Arabic: سَيْف كَاظِم حُسَيْن; born 7 February 1991) is a Swedish footballer who plays as a midfielder for Assyriska IK.

== Career ==
=== Club career ===
In December 2017, it was confirmed that Kadhim had joined Umeå FC. On 13 January 2020, Kadhim then moved to Swedish Division 1 Södra club Assyriska IK.
