= Ahmad El Khodor =

Lebanese footballer (born 1984)

Personal information
- Full name: Ahmad Mohammad El Khodor
- Date of birth: 30 November 1984 (age 41)
- Place of birth: Saudi Arabia
- Height: 1.89 m (6 ft 2 in)
- Position: Centre-back

Senior career*
Years	Team	Apps	(Gls)
2005–2008	Tadamon Sour		
2008–2014	Ansar		
- Irshad Chehim

International career
2007	Lebanon U23	4	(0)
2008–2010	Lebanon	4	(0)
- * Club domestic league appearances and goals

Ahmad Mohammad El Khodor (Arabic: أحمد محمد الخضر; born 30 November 1984) is a former footballer who played as centre-back. Born in Saudi Arabia, he played for the Lebanon national team between 2008 and 2010.

== Club career ==
In summer 2007, El Khodor joined Ansar from Tadamon Sour ahead of the 2007–08 Lebanese Premier League. He also played for Irshad Chehim.

== International career ==
El Khodor is of Palestinian descent; he represented Lebanon internationally, both at under-23 and senior levels.

== See also ==
- List of Lebanese people in Saudi Arabia
- List of Lebanon international footballers born outside Lebanon
