= Abdullah Al-Attar =

Jordanian footballer

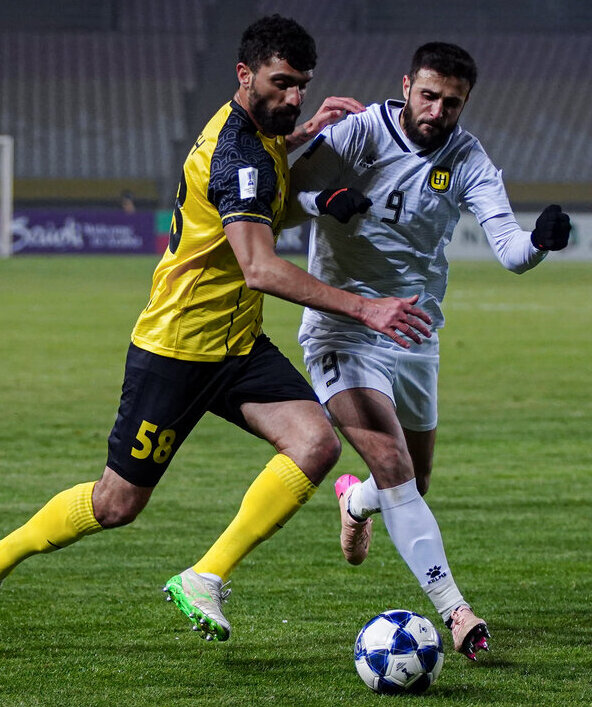
- Al-Attar (white) defending Mohammad Daneshgar in 2025

Personal information
- Full name: Abdullah Mohannad Abdel-Rahman Al-Attar
- Date of birth: 4 October 1992 (age 34)
- Place of birth: Amman, Jordan
- Position: Striker

Team information
- Current team: Al-Hussein

Youth career
- 2005–2010: Al-Faisaly

Senior career*
Years	Team	Apps	(Gls)
2011–2014	Al-Faisaly		
2014–2016	Shabab Al-Ordon		
2016–2021	Al-Jazeera		
2021–2022	Al-Ahli		
2022–	Al-Hussein		
2026	→Shabab Al-Ordon (loan)	13	(2)

International career^{‡}
2012–2014	Jordan U22		(1)
2017–2024	Jordan	9	(0)
- * Club domestic league appearances and goals as of 29 January 2026 ‡ National team caps and goals as of 3 October 2024

Abdullah Mohannad Abdel-Rahman Al-Attar (Arabic: عبد الله مهند عبد الرحمن العطار; born 4 October 1992) is a Jordanian professional footballer who plays as a striker for Jordanian Pro League club Al-Hussein.

== International career ==
Al-Attar's first appearance with the Jordan national senior team was against Hong Kong in a friendly match on 23 March 2017 at Amman, which resulted in a 4–0 victory for Jordan.

=== International goals ===
#	Date	Venue	Opponent	Score	Result	Competition
1	May 27, 2012	Amman	Lebanon	5-0	Win	U-22 Friendly
