= Al-Tali'aa Taizz =

Association football club in Yemen

Al-Tali'aa Taiz
- Full name: Al-Tali'aa Taiz Sport Club
- Founded: 1966; 59 years ago
- Ground: Al-Shuhadaa stadium
- League: Yemeni League
Home colours	Away colours

Al-Tali'aa Taiz Sport Club (Arabic: نادي الطليعة تعز الرياضي الثقافي), is a Yemeni professional football club based in Taiz, that plays in Yemeni League.

== Honours ==
- Yemeni League:

Runners up (1) : 1999–2000

- Yemeni President Cup:

Runners up (1) : 2012
