= Mohammed Al-Mashari =

Omani footballer (born 1990)

Personal information
- Full name: Mohammed Salim Khalfan Al-Mashari
- Date of birth: 4 December 1990 (age 35)
- Place of birth: Bawshar, Oman
- Height: 1.79 m (5 ft 10 in)
- Position: Attacking midfielder

Team information
- Current team: Fanja
- Number: 10

Youth career
- 2003–2007: Bowsher

Senior career*
Years	Team	Apps	(Gls)
2007–2009	Bowsher	?	(?)
2009–	Fanja		(2)

International career
2011	Oman U-23	2	(0)
2012–	Oman	13	(0)
- * Club domestic league appearances and goals

Mohammed Salim Khalfan Al-Mashari (Arabic: محمد بن سالم المعشري; born 4 December 1990), commonly known as Mohammed Al-Mashari, is an Omani footballer who plays for Fanja SC.

== Club career ==
On 2 July 2014, he agreed a contract extension with 2013–14 Oman Professional League runners-up Fanja SC.

=== Club career statistics ===
Club	Season	Division	League		Cup		Continental (Note: Includes appearances in the AFC Cup)		Other		Total	
Club	Season	Division	Apps	Goals	Apps	Goals	Apps	Goals	Apps	Goals	Apps	Goals
Fanja	2011–12	Oman Professional League	-	2	-	1	0	0	-	1	-	4
Fanja	2012-13	Oman Professional League	-	0	-	0	7	2	-	0	-	2
Fanja	2013–14	Oman Professional League	-	0	-	0	5	0	-	0	-	0
Fanja	Total		-	2	-	1	12	2	-	1	-	6
Career total			-	2	-	1	12	2	-	1	-	6

== International career ==
Mohammed Al-Maashari was first selected for the Oman national football team in 2012. He made his international debut on 8 December 2012 against Lebanon in the 2012 WAFF Championship.[1]

He also represented Oman in the 2014 FIFA World Cup qualification (AFC) and the 2015 AFC Asian Cup qualification.

== Honours ==
Fanja

- Omani League runner-up: 2012–13
- Sultan Qaboos Cup: 2013
- Oman Super Cup: 2012; runner-up: 2013, 2014
