= 2012 Yemeni President Cup =

Tournament details
- Country: Yemen

Final positions
- Champions: Al-Ahli Ta'izz
- Runners-up: Al-Tali'aa Taizz

The 2012 Yemeni President Cup is the 14th edition to be held and back after a years absence due to the 2011 Yemeni revolution.

The winners qualify for the 2013 AFC Cup.

The competition started in October with a Preliminary Round featuring four sides. The winners advance to the round of 32 and then so on in a knockout basis played over one game.

== Preliminary round ==
Team 1	Score	Team 2
Al Shabab Ibb (Yemen)	1-0	(Yemen) Al Shabab October
Al-Tali'aa Taizz (Yemen)	(w/o) ^{1}	(Yemen) Al Ahly Al Hadyadh

^{1} Al Ahly Al Hadyadh left the field during play and the result was awarded 3:0 to Al-Tali'aa Taizz

== Round of 32 ==
Team 1	Score	Team 2
Tadamon Shapwah (Yemen)	2-1	(Yemen) Al Shabab Ibb
Al-Hilal Al-Sahili (Yemen)	3-0	(Yemen) Tadamon Al Mukalla
Al-Shula (Yemen)	3-0	(Yemen) Shebam Hadramout
Najm Sba (Yemen)	0-0 (3-1)	(Yemen) Shabab Al Baydaa
Shmsan (Yemen)	2-3	(Yemen) Al-Tali'aa Taizz
Nasser Aden (Yemen)	3-2	(Yemen) Al Ittihad Ibb
Nasser Al Talla (Yemen)	0-0 (4-2)	(Yemen) Al Wahda Aden
Al Rasheed Ta'izz (Yemen)	0-2	(Yemen) Al Ahli Sana'a
Al-Oruba Zabid (Yemen)	0-0 (8-9)	(Yemen) Al-Sha'ab Hadramaut
Al Tilal (Yemen)	3-0	(Yemen) Al Saqr
Salam Al-Garfa (Yemen)	0-0 (3-4)	(Yemen) Khanfar
Al-Ahli Ta'izz (Yemen)	2-1	(Yemen) Al Wahda Sana'a
Seuon (Yemen)	1-0	(Yemen) Al Yarmuk Al Rawda
May 22 San'a' (Yemen)	1-1 (4-3)	(Yemen) Al Sha'ab Sana'a
Al Shrth (Yemen)	(w/o) ^{1}	(Yemen) Shabab Al Jeel
Hassan (Yemen)	(w/o) ^{2}	(Yemen) Al Fateh

^{1} Shabab Al Jeel failed to turn up and the result was awarded 3:0 to Al Shrth
^{2} Hassan failed to turn up and the result was awarded 3:0 to Al Fateh

== Quarter finals ==
Team 1	Score	Team 2
Al Fateh (Yemen)	0-2	(Yemen) Al-Tali'aa Taizz
May 22 San'a' (Yemen)	1-1 (0-3)	(Yemen) Al-Hilal Al-Sahili
Nasser Aden (Yemen)	1-2	(Yemen) Al-Ahli Ta'izz
Al Tilal (Yemen)	2-1	(Yemen) Al Ahli Sana'a

== Semi finals ==
Team 1	Score	Team 2
Al-Ahli Ta'izz (Yemen)	0-0 (9-8)	(Yemen) Al Tilal
Al-Tali'aa Taizz (Yemen)	1-0	(Yemen) Al-Hilal Al-Sahili

== Final ==
26 November 2012	Al-Tali'aa Taizz	0 – 1	Al-Ahli Ta'izz	Ali Muhesen, San'a
San'a 15:30		Summary
