= Gilson Tussi =

Brazilian footballer (born 1984)

Personal information
- Full name: Gilson Tussi Júnior
- Date of birth: July 6, 1984 (age 42)
- Place of birth: São Jorge d'Oeste, Brazil
- Position: Midfielder

Team information
- Current team: Ríver

Senior career*
Years	Team	Apps	(Gls)
2006–2007	Tupi		
2007	AC Lugano	16	(1)
2008	Guarani (MG)		
2008	Sambenedettese	3	(0)
- ?
2011	Morrinhos		
2011	Anapolina		
2011–2012	Penarol (AM)	7	(0)
2012–2014	Al-Shorta		
2014–2015	Itapirense	7	(0)
2015	Águia Negra		
2015–2016	Santos-AP	2	(0)
2016–	Ríver	0	(0)
- * Club domestic league appearances and goals as of 8 February 2016

Gilson Tussi Júnior (born 6 July 1984) is a Brazilian footballer who plays for Ríver.

He was signed by AC Lugano in July 2007. He also holds Italian passport.

Gilson Tussi trained with Chivas USA during the 2010 preseason, but wasn't signed by the club. In December 2010 he returned to Brazil for Morrinhos. In June, he was signed by Anapolina and in August signed by Penarol Atlético Clube of Brasileiro Série D.

Gilson Tussi played for Syrian side Al-Shorta SC Damascus.
