= Abdullah Al Buraiki =

Kuwaiti footballer

Abdullah Al-Buraiki
Personal information
- Full name: Abdullah Salem Al-Buraiki
- Date of birth: August 12, 1987 (age 39)
- Place of birth: Kuwait City, Kuwait
- Position: Midfielder

Youth career
- 1994–2006: Al-Salmiya

Senior career*
Years	Team	Apps	(Gls)
2006–2011	Al-Salmiya	47	(14)
2011	Salalah SC	1	(0)
2011–2022	Al Kuwait	118	(25)

International career^{‡}
2009–2019	Kuwait	33	(3)
- * Club domestic league appearances and goals as of 20 October 2020 ‡ National team caps and goals as of September 12, 2020

Abdullah Al-Buraiki (Arabic: عبدالله سالم البريكي, born 12 August 1987) is a Kuwaiti footballer.

== International career ==
=== International goals ===
Scores and results list Kuwait's goal tally first.

No	Date	Venue	Opponent	Score	Result	Competition
1.	8 November 2009	Al Kuwait Sports Club Stadium, Kuwait City, Kuwait	China	1–0	2–2	Friendly
2.	25 February 2010	Tahnoun bin Mohamed Stadium, Al Ain, United Arab Emirates	Bahrain	4–1	4–1	Friendly
3.	22 December 2017	Jaber Al-Ahmad International Stadium, Kuwait City, Kuwait	Saudi Arabia	1–2	1–2	23rd Arabian Gulf Cup
