= Fanja SC =

Association football club

Fanja SC نادي فنجاء
- Full name: Fanja Sports Club نادي فنجاء الرياضي
- Nicknames: Al-Malik (The King)
- Founded: 1970; 56 years ago
- Ground: Sultan Qaboos Sports Complex; Royal Oman Police Stadium; Boshar, Muscat, Oman; Al-Seeb Stadium; Al-Seeb, Muscat, Oman
- Capacity: 14,000
- Chairman: (Oman) Hamyar Al-Ismaily.
- Manager: (Oman) Sulaiman Al-Mazroui
- League: Oman League
- 2017–18: 12th ▼
- Website: www.fanja-city.com
Home colours	Away colours

Fanja Sports Club (Arabic: نادي فنجاء الرياضي; known locally as Al-Malik; lit. 'The King'), known simply as Fanja, is an Omani professional sports club based in Fanja. The club currently plays in the Oman Professional League, top division of Oman Football Association. Their home ground is Al-Seeb Stadium. The stadium is government owned, but they also own their own stadium and sports equipment, as well as their own training facilities.

== History ==
Fanja SC was founded in 1970 and registered in the very next year in 1971. The club has a total of eight Omani League titles to their name. The club achieved the greatest success in the 1970s and the 1980s, but the death of the club owner HRH Sayyid Sami adversely affected the club and after that for the next 20 years, Fanja did not win any trophies. Fanja had a return to success in 2010 where they started winning trophies every season, their most recent achievement was in 2014 when they won the 2013–14 Sultan Qaboos Cup for the record 9th time in a 2–0 win over Al-Nahda Club. After two decades, Fanja SC regained the most coveted and prestigious football title in Oman, the Sultan Qaboos Cup.

Fanja Club (Fanja), nicknamed "The King", is one of the most popular and successful clubs in the Sultanate of Oman. The club is not only a popular club in Oman, but also in the wider Gulf Cooperation Council as well as in other Arab and African countries.

The club was founded in 1973, and has always been supportive of the difference of football in Oman. Fanja was the first Omani club to win an international tournament. It was the 1989 Gulf Club Champions Cup, later named GCC Champions League. Fanja defeated Al-Muharraq SC of Bahrain in a penalty shootout after the match had ended 1–1 in the normal time. Fanja has appeared four times in the same tournament.

Despite the difficulties suffered by the club in the recent years, Fanja maintained their record by winning the first and the only GCC Cup for Oman while also winning 8 Sultan Qaboos Cups. The club also won the GCC Club Championship (U-17) twice—1995 in the KSA and 1997 in Qatar and only two other clubs in the Gulf have been able to achieve this.

Fanja has always been one of the major contributors to the Omani national team. Many players of Fanja have appeared in different international and GCC tournaments.

=== Fanja in the seventies ===
The beginning of the club

During the 1970s, life was very simple and clubs did not have the ability to spend money on their teams or players. But Fanja managed to win championships with the support of their loyal fans who were behind the club in every match and gave them significant support.

=== Fanja in the eighties ===
Football turning point in the Sultanate

During the 1980s, there was a turning point for football clubs in Oman. Fanja and their supporters and fans along with the founders of the club were among the first people who realized this and chose the right man for the owner's job who was first Mr. Sami bin Hamad bin Hamoud Al Busaidi and then his younger brother, Mr. Khalid bin Hamad Al Busaidi. In this period Fanja spent an estimated amount of RO 120,000 annually for the football team. With this income, Fanja continued to win and other teams could not dare to stand in their way. During this period, and in the late eighties, Fanja had 15 players that represented the national team.

=== 1990 to 2005 ===
Financial crisis at the club

In 1990, Khalid bin Hamad Al Busaidi left Fanja, and therefore Fanja's financial support disappeared as well. This led to more than 15 of the best players in the Fanja squad going to other clubs. The club could not stand on their feet. After Std. Khalid Al-Busaidi left the club, Skh. Ahmed Al-Naimi took charge for shirt time then left. In 1994-1995 Salem Al-Zawawi took up as Fanja's Chairman whereby Fanja U-17 won GCC Club Championship in Kingdom of Saudi Arabia. Upon his departing the club, Fanja went to 2nd Division for the 1st time since established, this was in 1997. Hamyar Al-Ismaily took charge immediately in 1997 whereby the club win GGC Clubs U-17 Championship for the second time in Qatar and later promoted back to 1st Division till he left the club end of 1999. But the club managed to win GCC Club Championship (U-17) twice—1995 in the KSA and 1997 in Qatar. These accomplishments were achieved because of the material support to the club. Only because of the financial crisis at the club, Fanja was unable to maintain its position as the best team in Oman. Fanja dropped again to 2nd Division in 2003 when wan under the Chairmanship of Hammed Al-Harthi and again it was put back to Premium League in 2010 under the Chairmanship of Hamyar Al-Ismaily. It has since then remained at Premier League till today with winning spree. Hamyar Al-Ismaily resigned in 2013 for health reasons and Seif Al-Sumri took charge, Fanja continued to win Championships till last season. 2017, a new Club Chairman was elected Ahmed Al-Hadabi but did last more than 2 weeks, he resigned and since then the club is without chairman.

=== 2006 to 2012 ===
The new administration, a new era

In 2006, Hamyar bin Nasser Ismaili returned to the club with the new administration. The club at that time was undergoing a financial crisis but the new administration had a vision and goals and charted a plan to march Fanja Club back to its "natural place".

The three main goals that were worked out by the club's management:

1 - Do everything to restore the football team to the yop division.

2 - End all of the club's debts, and get more income.

3 - Develop and get the constructors and the club's offices.

The club was able to achieve all three objectives which they had developed. The football team managed to reach the final of the Sultan Qaboos Cup and then in the following season it managed to reach the top division league that is the Omani League. Fanja's march back to success did not stop at this point. They won both the 2011–12 Omani League and then the Omani Super Cup for the first time. The latter was won against Omani giants Dhofar. These titles were won after a twenty-year period.

All the club's debts have been relieved because of the administration's strategy and the club has managed to get a better income with the help of partners of the club. The Ministry of Sports Affairs in the Sultanate of Oman has approved the building of a football stadium for the club (now nearly finished), as well as offices in the stadium and more facilities. Fanja has now returned to its "natural place" and the club is currently working to develop a new vision and objectives so that Fanja becomes the best club in Oman.

== Being a multisport club ==
Although being mainly known for their football, Fanja SC like many other clubs in Oman, have not only football in their list, but also hockey, volleyball, handball, basketball, badminton and squash. They also have a youth football team competing in the Omani Youth league.

== Crest and colours ==
Fanja SC have been known since establishment to wear a full yellow or grey (Away) kit (usually a darker shade of yellow). Back in the early years, they wore a yellow jersey with two stripes across, but after the death of club owner HRH Sayyid Sami, they added one more stripe to the jersey to pay tribute to him. They have also had many different sponsor over the years. As of now, Uhlsport provides them with kits.

=== Logo ===
The club logo represents an Omani Castle looking like a cup on which the Sultanate map, a ball and a torch inside a green circle is drawn. This refers to the integration of old and modern games. It also highlights the country's adherence to traditional heritage while the ball refers to the importance of the game among the other sports and cultural related activities of the club. The torch, moreover, refers to peerless cultural activities of the members.

== Honours and achievements ==
=== National titles ===
- Oman Professional League (9):

- Winners 1976-77, 1978–79, 1983-84, 1985-86, 1986–87, 1987-88, 1990–91, 2011-12, 2015-16.
- Runners-up 2012-13, 2013-14, 2014-15.

- Sultan Qaboos Cup (9):

- Winners 1975, 1976, 1978, 1985, 1986, 1987, 1989, 1991, 2013-14.
- Runners-up 2010.

- Oman Professional League Cup (1):

- Winners 2014-15.

- Oman Super Cup (2):

- Winners 2012, 2015.
- Runners-up 2013, 2014.

== Club performance-International Competitions ==
=== AFC competitions ===
- Asian Club Championship : 3 appearances

- 1985 : Qualifying Round
- 1988 : Qualifying Round
- 1989 : Group Stage

- Asian Cup Winners' Cup : 2 appearances

- 1990–91 : First Round
- 1992-93 : Second Round

- AFC Cup : 2 appearances

- 2013 : Round of 16
- 2014 : Group Stage
- 2015 : Play-off Round

=== UAFA competitions ===
- GCC Champions League: 4 appearances

- 1987 : 5th Position
- 1988 : 4th Position
- 1989 : Winners
- 2012 : Group Stage

== Players ==
=== First-team squad ===
Note: Flags indicate national team as defined under FIFA eligibility rules; some limited exceptions apply. Players may hold more than one non-FIFA nationality.

No.	Pos.	Nation	Player
1	GK	OMA	Turki Al-Siyabi
18	GK	OMA	Mazin Al-Kasbi
23	GK	OMA	Ahmed Al-Hattali
26	GK	OMA	Abdulaziz Al-Hattali
2	DF	OMA	Salah Al-Siyabi
3	DF	OMA	Abdullah Al-Qasabi
5	DF	OMA	Nadhir Sloum
13	DF	OMA	Mohammed Al-Musalami
15	DF	OMA	Mukhlid Al-Ruqadi
20	DF	OMA	Basil Al-Rawahi
25	DF	OMA	Khalid Al-Yaqoobi
88	DF	OMA	Abbas Al-Hashmi
4	MF	OMA	Ali Al-Jabri

No.	Pos.	Nation	Player
6	MF	OMA	Hisam Al-Tobi
8	MF	OMA	Mahmood Al-Hasani
11	MF	OMA	Raed Ibrahim Saleh
10	MF	OMA	Mohamed Al-Maashari
17	MF	OMA	Omar Al-Hasani
19	MF	OMA	Samir Al-Tobi
80	MF	OMA	Azzan Al-Tamtami
7	FW	OMA	Mubarak Al-Muqbali
12	FW	OMA	Humaid Al-Haimali
22	FW	OMA	Bassam Al-Rawahi
70	FW	OMA	Fahad Al-Balushi
90	FW	OMA	Abdul Rahman Al-Ghassani

== Personnel ==
=== Current technical staff ===
Position	Name
Head coach	(Oman) Ibrahim Al-Anboury
Assistant coach	(Oman) Badar Al-Maimani
Goalkeeping coach	(Oman) Sulaiman Al-Mazroui
Team Manager	(Oman) Yousuf Hamdan Al-Harthi
Fitness coach	(Oman) Rafat Al-Said Al-Shabrawi
Club doctor	(Oman) Said Hamad Al-Balushi
Supervisor	(Oman) Suwaid Al-Hidabi
Media Coordinator	(Oman) Ali Saleem Al-Habsi

=== Management ===
Position	Staff
Chairman	Sheikh Hamyar Al-Ismaily
Vice-president	Seif Al-Sumri
General Secretary	Ahmed Al-Busaidi
Treasurer	Said Al-Baloushi
Board Member	5 others

== See also ==
- List of football clubs in Oman
