= Saleh Al Sheikh =

Former Kuwaiti footballer

Personal information
- Full name: Saleh Al Sheikh Al Hendi
- Date of birth: May 29, 1982 (age 44)
- Place of birth: Kuwait City, Kuwait
- Height: 1.75 m (5 ft 9 in)
- Position: Midfielder

Youth career
- 1992–2000: Al Qadsia

Senior career*
Years	Team	Apps	(Gls)
2000–2022	Al Qadsia		

International career^{‡}
2006–2015	Kuwait	62	(2)
- * Club domestic league appearances and goals as of April 10, 2018 ‡ National team caps and goals as of January 9, 2015

Saleh Al Sheikh Al Hendi (Arabic: صالح الشيخ الهندي, born 29 May 1982) is a former Kuwaiti footballer who played for the Kuwaiti Premier League club Al Qadsia.
