= Ahmad Al Douni =

Syrian footballer (born 1989)

Personal information
- Date of birth: 4 February 1989 (age 37)
- Place of birth: Baniyas, Syria
- Height: 1.83 m (6 ft 0 in)
- Position: Forward

Senior career*
Years	Team	Apps	(Gls)
2009–2013	Misfat Baniyas		(54)
2013	→Al-Riffa (loan)	10	(1)
2013	Al-Shorta	2	(1)
2013–2014	Al-Quwa Al-Jawiya	14	(1)
2014	Dohuk	7	(1)
2014	Al-Zawra'a	0	(0)
2015–2016	Dohuk	5	(2)
2016	Al-Riffa	2	(2)
2016–2017	Al-Najaf	18	(7)
2017–2018	Al-Ramtha	13	(7)
2018–2020	Mesaimeer	35	(24)
2020–2021	Al-Markhiya	21	(10)
2021–2022	Al-Jeel		
2022	Al-Hala		(3)

International career^{‡}
2011–2012	Syria U-23	4	(2)
2012–2019	Syria	25	(8)
- * Club domestic league appearances and goals ‡ National team caps and goals as of 11 August 2022

Ahmad Al Douni (Arabic: أحمد الدوني; born 4 February 1989) is a Syrian professional footballer who plays as a forward.

== Career statistics ==
As of 13 April 2023

Club	Division	Season	League		National Cup		Second Division Cup		Qatar Federation Cup		Total	
Club	Division	Season	Apps	Goals	Apps	Goals	Apps	Goals	Apps	Goals	Apps	Goals
Mesaimeer	Qatari Second Division	2018–19	15	8	0	0	3	2	0	0	18	10
Mesaimeer	Qatari Second Division	2019–20	20	16	0	0	2	0	0	0	22	16
Mesaimeer	Total		35	24	0	0	5	2	0	0	40	26
Al-Markhiya	Qatari Second Division	2020–21	21	10	0	0	3	0	6	4	24	10
Al-Markhiya	Total		21	10	0	0	3	0	6	4	24	10

== International career ==
=== International goals ===
Syria's score listed first; score column indicates score after each Al Douni goal.

No.	Date	Venue	Opponent	Score	Result	Competition
1.	17 November 2012	Amman International Stadium, Amman, Jordan	Palestine	1–1	1–1	Friendly
2.	20 November 2012	Prince Mohammed Stadium, Zarqa, Iraq	Palestine	1–2	1–2	Friendly
3.	13 December 2012	Al-Sadaqua Walsalam Stadium, Kuwait City, Kuwait	Iraq	1–1	1–1	2012 WAFF Championship
4.	16 December 2012	Al-Sadaqua Walsalam Stadium, Kuwait City, Kuwait	Jordan	1–1	2–1	2012 WAFF Championship
5.	16 December 2012	Al-Sadaqua Walsalam Stadium, Kuwait City, Kuwait	Jordan	2–1	2–1	2012 WAFF Championship
6.	18 December 2012	Al-Sadaqua Walsalam Stadium, Kuwait City, Kuwait	Bahrain	1–1	1–1 (3–2 p)	2012 WAFF Championship
7.	15 November 2013	Shahid Dastgerdi Stadium, Tehran, Iran	Singapore	2–0	4–0	2015 AFC Asian Cup qualification
8.	2 August 2019	Karbala Sports City, Karbala, Iraq	Lebanon	1–1	1–2	2019 WAFF Championship
