= Burhan Sahyouni =

Syrian footballer (born 1986)

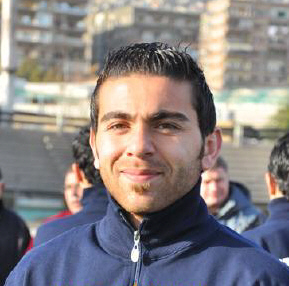

Personal information
- Date of birth: April 7, 1986 (age 40)
- Place of birth: Idlib, Syria
- Height: 1.70 m (5 ft 7 in)
- Position: Midfielder

Team information
- Current team: Al-Wahda SC (Syria)

Senior career*
Years	Team	Apps	(Gls)
2004–2006	Omayya	?	(?)
2006–2011	Al-Jaish	?	(?)
2011–2013	Duhok	61	(8)
2013–2014	Arbil	15	(0)
2014	Duhok	6	(0)
2015	Al-Najaf		
2015-2018	Al-Wahda (Syria)		
2018-2019	Al-Jaish SC Damascus		
2019-2020	Al-Wathba SC		
2020-2021	Al Ittihad Ahli of Aleppo SC		
2021-2023	Al-Wathba SC		
2023-	Al-Wahda SC (Syria)		

International career^{‡}
2007–2016	Syria	32	(2)
- * Club domestic league appearances and goals as of 14 June 2009 ‡ National team caps and goals as of 5 June 2016

Burhan Ahmed Sahyouni (Arabic: برهان أحمد صهيوني; born 7 April 1986 in Idlib, Syria) is a Syrian professional footballer. He currently plays for Al-Wahda, which competes in the Syrian Premier League, the top tier of Football in Syria.

== International career ==
Burhan Sahyouni is currently a member of the Syria national football team. He made 3 appearances for the Syria national football team during the qualifying rounds of the 2010 FIFA World Cup.

=== International goals ===
Scores and results table. Syria's goal tally first:

Burhan Sahyouni: International goals
No.	Date	Venue	Opponent	Score	Result	Competition
1	17 August 2011	Saida International Stadium, Saida, Lebanon	Lebanon	1–1	3–2	International Friendly
2	15 August 2013	Shahid Dastgerdi Stadium, Tehran, Iran	Jordan	1–1	1-1	2015 AFC Asian Cup qualification

== Honours and titles ==
=== Club ===
Al-Jaish

- Syrian Premier League: 2009–10
