= List of Kuwaiti football transfers 2025–26 =

The 2025–26 Kuwaiti football transfer window spans from July 3, 2025 to September 20, 2025 for the summer period, and from January 2, 2026 to January 31, 2026 for the winter period.

== Summer transfer window ==
Registration period: July 3, 2025 - September 20, 2025

Note: All players and clubs without a flag are Kuwaiti.

=== Domestic ===
Date	Player	From	To	Fee	Reference
12 June 2025	Ahmed Al-Yahya	Al-Nasr	Qadsia	Undisclosed	
18 June 2025	Mohammed Al-Rabie	Sahel	Al-Jahra	Undisclosed	
22 June 2025	(Angola) Antonio Di Silva	Al-Sulaibikhat	Al-Jahra	Free	
24 June 2025	Dhahi Al-Shammari	Al-Arabi	Al Shabab	Undisclosed	
24 June 2025	Shaheen Al-Khamis	Sahel	Al Shabab	Undisclosed	
24 June 2025	Yaqoub Al-Tararwa	Al Yarmouk	Al Shabab	Undisclosed	
25 June 2025	Ali Al-Doukhi	Al Shabab	Al-Fahaheel	Undisclosed	
27 June 2025	Othman Al-Dosari	Al Salmiya	Al Yarmouk	Undisclosed	
30 June 2025	Mohammed Khalil	Qadsia	Al Shabab	Undisclosed	
1 July 2025	Ahmed Ghazi Al-Otaibi	Al-Fahaheel	Al Shabab	Undisclosed	
3 July 2025	Khaled Al-Rashidi	Qadsia	Kuwait SC	Undisclosed	
7 July 2025	Saud Al-Janai	Al Yarmouk	Al Shabab	Undisclosed	
8 July 2025	Khalifa Rahil	Al-Nasr	Kazma	Undisclosed	
13 July 2025	Hussain Al-Harbi	Al-Nasr	Al Shabab	Undisclosed	
14 July 2025	Hamad Al-Harbi	Kazma	Al-Arabi	Undisclosed	
15 July 2025	Hameed Al-Qallaf	Kuwait SC	Qadsia	Undisclosed	
17 July 2025	Fahad Al-Harbi	Al-Nasr	Burgan	Undisclosed	
20 July 2025	(Iran) Abdulaziz Nasari	Qadsia	Al-Arabi	Free	
22 July 2025	Mohammed Ajaj	Al-Nasr	Al Yarmouk	Undisclosed	
24 July 2025	Shuraida Al-Shuraida	Kazma	Al-Fahaheel	Undisclosed	
24 July 2025	Zaid Zakaria	Khaitan	Al-Nasr	Undisclosed	
25 July 2025	(Algeria) Sofiane Bouchar	Al-Arabi	Qadsia	Free	
26 July 2025	Talal Al Fadhel	Kuwait SC	Qadsia	Undisclosed	
26 July 2025	Nasser Salem	Al-Arabi	Al Salmiya	Undisclosed	
26 July 2025	(Yemen) Omar Ali Al-Omar	Al-Fahaheel	Al Salmiya	Undisclosed	
26 July 2025	Badr Jalal	Al-Arabi	Al Salmiya	Undisclosed	
26 July 2025	Abdullah Al Shemali	Qadsia	Al Salmiya	Undisclosed	
26 July 2025	Fawaz Al-Dosary	Al-Fahaheel	Al Salmiya	Undisclosed	
28 July 2025	Nayef Al-Azam	Khaitan	Al-Nasr	Undisclosed	
28 July 2025	Bandar Al-Barazi	Al-Nasr	Kazma	€260k	
28 July 2025	(Brazil) Marcos Martinelli	Al-Sulaibikhat	Khaitan	Undisclosed	
29 July 2025	Fawaz Al-Khaldi	Khaitan	Al-Nasr	Undisclosed	
29 July 2025	Salman Al-Bose	Qadsia	Al-Fahaheel	Undisclosed	
29 July 2025	(Brazil) Bruno Calixto	Al-Sulaibikhat	Al Shabab	Undisclosed	
2 August 2025	Muzid Al-Masnad		Al-Nasr	Undisclosed	
3 August 2025	Omar Al-Matar	Kuwait SC	Al-Fahaheel	Undisclosed	
3 August 2025	Abdulmohsen Al-Ajmi	Al-Fahaheel	Al Tadhamon	Undisclosed	
3 August 2025	Salman Al-Ajmi	Khaitan	Al Tadhamon	Undisclosed	
3 August 2025	Ali Fadel	Al Salmiya	Al Tadhamon	Undisclosed	
4 August 2025	Nayef Zwaid	Al Tadhamon	Al Shabab	Undisclosed	
4 August 2025	Mohammed Al-Mershad	Al Tadhamon	Al Yarmouk	Undisclosed	
11 August 2025	Meshal Khaled	Qadsia	Al-Nasr	Undisclosed	
17 August 2025	Abdulaziz Asaad	Khaitan	Al-Jahra	Undisclosed	
17 August 2025	(The Gambia) Stephen Sey	Al-Jahra	Khaitan	Undisclosed	
22 August 2025	Ibrahim Al-Zafiri	Al-Nasr	Al Yarmouk	Undisclosed	
25 August 2025	(Morocco) Mehdi Berrahma	Qadsia	Kuwait SC	Free	
7 September 2025	Meteb Al-Salama	Burgan	Sporty	Undisclosed	
7 September 2025	Salem Al-Houli	Al-Fahaheel	Sporty	Undisclosed	
7 September 2025	Abdullah Al-Najdi	Al-Jahra	Sporty	Undisclosed	
7 September 2025	Abdulrahman Al-Enezi	Al Salmiya	Sporty	Undisclosed	
7 September 2025	Youssef Al-Madi	Kuwait SC	Sporty	Undisclosed	
7 September 2025	Hussein Hajiah	Qadsia	Sporty	Undisclosed	
7 September 2025	Youssef Al-Muwail	Qadsia	Sporty	Undisclosed	
7 September 2025	Salem Al-Khatlan	Kazma	Sporty	Undisclosed	
7 September 2025	Talal Al-Hassan	Kuwait SC	Sporty	Undisclosed	
7 September 2025	Abdullah Bomjdad	Al Salmiya	Sporty	Undisclosed	
7 September 2025	Abdulaziz Al-Huthail		Sporty	Undisclosed	
7 September 2025	Bader Al-Zayed	Kazma	Sporty	Undisclosed	
7 September 2025	Ibrahim Al-Tamimi	Al-Jazeera	Sporty	Undisclosed	
7 September 2025	Omar Al-Enezi	Al-Arabi	Sporty	Undisclosed	
7 September 2025	Abdulaziz Jamal		Sporty	Undisclosed	
8 September 2025	Mekki Al-Qallaf		Sporty	Undisclosed	
12 September 2025	Khaled Al-Enezi	Al-Nasr	Sporty	Undisclosed	
13 September 2025	Thamir Al-Hubaida	Al-Arabi	Sporty	Undisclosed	
13 September 2025	Bashar Abdullah		Khaitan	Undisclosed	
13 September 2025	Mishari Al-Kandari	Sahel	Khaitan	Undisclosed	
13 September 2025	Fahad Al-Azmi	Al-Arabi	Sporty	Undisclosed	
14 September 2025	Ali Wali	Kuwait SC	Al-Shamiya	Undisclosed	
14 September 2025	Ahmad Al-Shammari	Al-Jazeera	Al-Shamiya	Undisclosed	
14 September 2025	Jamal Mahmoud Jamal	Al-Jazeera	Al-Shamiya	Undisclosed	
14 September 2025	Othman Al-Failakawi	Al-Fahaheel	Al-Shamiya	Undisclosed	
14 September 2025	Mohammad Al-Kandari		Al-Shamiya	Undisclosed	
14 September 2025	Fawaz Al-Shammari	Al Tadhamon	Al-Shamiya	Undisclosed	
14 September 2025	Khaled Al-Dousari		Al-Shamiya	Undisclosed	
14 September 2025	Abdulrahman Baron		Al-Shamiya	Undisclosed	
14 September 2025	Abdullah Al-Fadhli		Al-Shamiya	Undisclosed	
14 September 2025	Dhari Al-Marzouq	Al Salmiya	Al-Shamiya	Undisclosed	
14 September 2025	Mohammad Al-Ali		Al-Shamiya	Undisclosed	
14 September 2025	Jamel Belkhir		Al-Shamiya	Undisclosed	
14 September 2025	Yahya Al-Agha		Al-Shamiya	Undisclosed	
14 September 2025	Omar Al-Maimouni	Kazma	Al-Shamiya	Undisclosed	

=== Non Domestic ===
Date	Player	From	To	Fee	Reference
7 June 2025	(Jordan) Ali Al-Azaizeh	(Bahrain) Al-Khaldiya	Kazma	Undisclosed	
7 June 2025	(Jordan) Yousef Abu Al-Jazar	(Jordan) Al-Wehdat	Kazma	Free	
13 June 2025	(Senegal) Seydina Keita	Al Tadhamon	(Lithuania) Panevėžys	Undisclosed	
21 June 2025	(Argentina) Sergio Vittor	Kuwait SC	(Argentina) Banfield	Free	
24 June 2025	(Senegal) Omar Wade	Al Shabab	(France) Gueugnon	Free	
29 June 2025	Sultan Al Enezi	(Oman) Dhofar Club	Kazma	Free	
1 July 2025	(Brazil) Caique Chagas	(Montenegro) FK Dečić	Al Shabab	Free	
1 July 2025	(Morocco) Hamza Khabba	Al-Arabi	(Morocco) AS FAR	Free	
1 July 2025	(Brazil) Uilliam Barros	Al-Fahaheel	(Indonesia) Persib Bandung	Free	
1 July 2025	(Guinea-Bissau) Bubacar Djaló	Al Tadhamon	(Serbia) Radnički Niš	Free	
3 July 2025	(Mali) Moriba Diarra	(Algeria) ES Sétif	Al Yarmouk	Free	
4 July 2025	(Italy) Mario Fontanella	Al Yarmouk	(Malta) Żabbar St. Patrick	Free	
5 July 2025	(Brazil) Brendon Lucas	(Indonesia) Persik Kediri	Al-Fahaheel	Free	
9 July 2025	(Republic of the Congo) Amour Loussoukou	(Tunisia) Ben Guerdane	Al Yarmouk	Undisclosed	
11 July 2025	(Ghana) Reuben Acquah	(Iraq) Duhok	Al Yarmouk	Undisclosed	
11 July 2025	(Estonia) Ilja Antonov	Al Shabab	(Estonia) Kuressaare	Free	
12 July 2025	(Tunisia) Hazem Haj Hassen	(Tunisia) Sfaxien	Al Yarmouk	Free	
14 July 2025	(Algeria) Zakaria Benchaâ	(Algeria) Constantine	Al-Fahaheel	Free	
14 July 2025	Hassan Al-Enezi	Al Arabi	(Jordan) Al Ahli	Free	
15 July 2025	(France) Hassimi Fadiga	(Bulgaria) Levski Sofia	Al-Arabi	Free	
15 July 2025	(Uganda) Kenneth Semakula	(Tunisia) Club Africain	Al-Arabi	€69k	
16 July 2025	(Albania) Hysen Memolla	(Kosovo) Suhareka	Al-Jahra	Free	
16 July 2025	(Nigeria) Prince Obus Aggreh	Khaitan	(Malaysia) Kelantan TRW	Free	
17 July 2025	(Jamaica) Khori Bennett	Al-Nasr	(United States) Sacramento	Undisclosed	
19 July 2025	(North Macedonia) Oliver Stoimenovski	(North Macedonia) GFK Tikvesh	Al-Jahra	Free	
19 July 2025	(Iran) Reza Yazdandoost	Al Yarmouk	(Iran) Sanat Naft Abadan	Free	
21 July 2025	(Syria) Abdullah Al Shami	(Syria) Al-Karamah	Al Yarmouk	Undisclosed	
22 July 2025	(Morocco) Yahya Jabrane	Kuwait SC	(Morocco) Wydad	Undisclosed	
22 July 2025	(Algeria) Drice Chaabi	(Algeria) ES Sétif	Kazma	Undisclosed	
22 July 2025	(Morocco) Amine Aboulfath	Kuwait SC	(Morocco) Wydad	Free	
22 July 2025	(Nigeria) Chigozie Mbah	Khaitan	(Thailand) Uthai Thani	Free	
22 July 2025	(Tunisia) Ismaïl Sassi	Al-Jazeera	(Thailand) Kasetsart	Free	
24 July 2025	(Egypt) Sam Morsy	(England) Ipswich Town	Kuwait SC	Free	
25 July 2025	(Syria) Homam Mahmoud	(Germany) Jahn Regensburg II	Al-Fahaheel	Free	
26 July 2025	(Morocco) Karim El Oualadi	Al Jahra	(Saudi Arabia) Al-Sharq Club	Free	
28 July 2025	(Algeria) Imadeddine Azzi	Kazma	(Russia) Dynamo Makhachkala	€300k	
28 July 2025	(Tunisia) Mohamed Saghraoui	(Saudi Arabia) Arar	Khaitan	Undisclosed	
28 July 2025	(Tunisia) Oussema Ben Ayed	(Saudi Arabia) Al-Jeel	Khaitan	Undisclosed	
28 July 2025	(Belgium) Julien Ngoy	(Belgium) Mechelen	Al-Arabi	Free	
28 July 2025	(Brazil) Maros Arthur	(Brazil) GE Bagé	Al Shabab	Undisclosed	
29 July 2025	(Brazil) Rodrigo Yuri	Al-Fahaheel	(Bahrain) Al-Riffa	Free	
30 July 2025	(Nigeria) Kingsley Sokari	Kazma	(Uzbekistan) Nasaf	Free	
31 July 2025	(Estonia) Bogdan Vaštšuk	Al Shabab	(Slovenia) Koper	Free	
1 August 2025	(Nigeria) Okiki Afolabi	(Thailand) Naft Maysan SC	Al Tadhamon	Free	
1 August 2025	(Brazil) Matheus Vieira	(Switzerland) Étoile Carouge	Al-Jazeera	Free	
2 August 2025	(Syria) Mahmoud Al Aswad	(Iraq) Zakho	Al Salmiya	Undisclosed	
3 August 2025	(Democratic Republic of the Congo) Henock Inonga Baka	(Morocco) AS FAR	Kuwait SC	Undisclosed	
3 August 2025	(Saudi Arabia) Turki Al-Mutairi	(Saudi Arabia) Al-Hazem	Al Tadhamon	Undisclosed	
4 August 2025	(Portugal) Pedro Machado	(Canada) Pacific	Al Tadhamon	Undisclosed	
4 August 2025	(Niger) Zakariya Souleymane	(France) Bourg-en-Bresse	Al Tadhamon	Free	
4 August 2025	(France) Jonathan Bumbu	(Italy) Team Altamura	Al Tadhamon	Free	
5 August 2025	(Nigeria) Daniel Ajibola	Qadsia	(Iraq) Al-Quwa Al-Jawiya	Free	
5 August 2025	(Ivory Coast) Presnel Banga	(Tunisia) Ben Guerdane	Al Yarmouk	Undisclosed	
6 August 2025	(Brazil) Lucas Gonçalves	(Brazil) ABC FC	Al Shabab	Undisclosed	
8 August 2025	(Senegal) Malick Mbaye	(Italy) Ostiamare	Al-Jazeera	Undisclosed	
10 August 2025	(Brazil) Lukas Brambilla	(India) Chennaiyin	Al-Fahaheel	Free	
12 August 2025	(Guinea-Bissau) Toni Silva	Kazma	(Malta) Zabbar SP	Free	
14 August 2025	(Morocco) Ismail Khafi	Qadsia	(Morocco) Raja Casablanca	Free	
15 August 2025	(Croatia) Filip Dangubić	(Bosnia and Herzegovina) Željezničar	Al Jahra	Free	
23 August 2025	(Egypt) Kahraba	(Libya) Al Ittihad	Qadsia	Free	
25 August 2025	(Uganda) Kenneth Semakula	Al Arabi	Free Agent	Free	
25 August 2025	(Morocco) Nabil Marmouk	(Morocco) Wydad	Al Arabi	Undisclosed	
25 August 2025	(Democratic Republic of the Congo) Henock Inonga Baka	Kuwait SC	Free Agent	Free	
25 August 2025	(Algeria) Victor Lekhal	(Qatar) Umm Salal	Qadsia	Free	
28 August 2025	(Libya) Al-Sanousi Al-Hadi	Al Salmiya	(Libya) Al Ittihad	Free	
30 August 2025	(Algeria) Abdeljalil Medioub	Al Jahra	(Saudi Arabia) Al-Zulfi	Free	
4 September 2025	(Nigeria) John Musa Peter		Burgan	Undisclosed	
5 September 2025	Dhahi Al-Shammari	Al Shabab	Free Agent	Free	
5 September 2025	(Brazil) Pablo Vinicius	(Saudi Arabia) Al-Sharq	Khaitan	Undisclosed	
7 September 2025	(Brazil) Nando Welter	(Malaysia) Kuching City	Al-Jazeera	Undisclosed	
10 September 2025	(Democratic Republic of the Congo) Neeskens Kebano	(United Arab Emirates) Al Jazira	Qadsia	Free	
11 September 2025	(Ivory Coast) Sheikh Mohammad Traori		Burgan	Undisclosed	
13 September 2025	(Syria) Mahmoud Zaid Oukla	(Syria) Al-Shorta	Sporty	Undisclosed	
14 September 2025	Musab Al Kanderi	Free Agent	Sporty	Free	
14 September 2025	Mishal Edilem	Free Agent	Al-Shamiya	Undisclosed	
15 September 2025	Omar Al-Azmi		Al-Arabi	Undisclosed	

=== Loans ===
Start date	Length	Player	From	To	Reference
22 July 2025	One Season	Yousef Al-Faji	Al Arabi	Al-Jazeera	
24 July 2025	One Season	Salman Al-Dhafeeri	Al Yarmouk	Sahel	
25 July 2025	One Season	Mohsen Fallah	Kuwait SC	Al-Nasr	
25 July 2025	One Season	Mohammed Al-Rashed	Kuwait SC	Al-Nasr	
26 July 2025	One Season	(Jordan) Husam Abu Dahab	(Jordan) Al-Faisaly	Al Salmiya	
29 July 2025	One Season	Naser Al-Failakawi	Al Yarmouk	Burgan	
3 August 2025	One Season	Abdulrahman Salem	Qadsia	Al Salmiya	
3 August 2025	Two Seasons	Soud Qassim	Qadsia	Al Salmiya	
5 August 2025	One Season	Abdulwahab Al-Shalal	Qadsia	Al Yarmouk	
7 August 2025	Extended for One More Season	Fawaz Al-Mubailish	Kuwait SC	Al-Nasr	
25 August 2025	One Season	Saleh Al-Mahri	Kazma	(Saudi Arabia) Jeddah	
9 September 2025	One Season	Omar Al-Shaya	Al Yarmouk	Al-Nasr	

== See also ==
- 2025–26 Kuwaiti Premier League
- 2025-26 Kuwaiti Division One
- 2025-26 Kuwait Super Cup
- 2025-26 Kuwait Emir Cup
- 2025-26 Kuwait Crown Prince Cup
