= 2025–26 Kuwait Emir Cup =

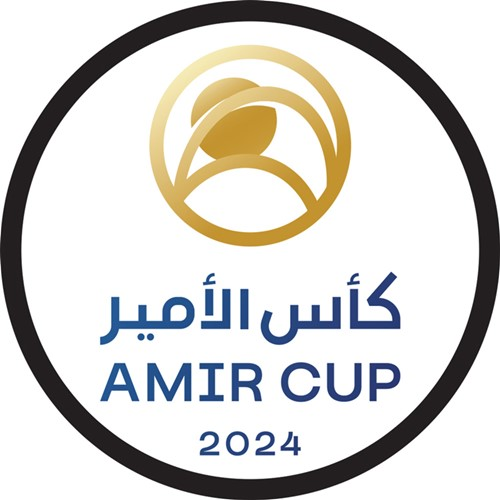

Tournament details
- Country: Kuwait
- Dates: December 2025 – May 2026
- Teams: 18

The 2025–26 Kuwait Emir Cup is an annual football competition and the 64th edition of the Kuwait Emir Cup. Kuwait SC are the defending champions winning 2024–25 edition over Al-Arabi 2–0. this edition sees two new teams participating Al-Shamiya FC and Sporty FC, making a total of 18 teams this edition.

Due to the 2026 Iran War, the Emir Cup was indefinitely postponed as a part of a total suspension of all sporting activities in the country from 28 February until further notice.

== Participating teams ==
League	Club	stage
Kuwait Premier League	Al-Kuwait	Quarter-Finals
Kuwait Premier League	Al Arabi	Quarter-Finals
Kuwait Premier League	Al-Qadsia	Quarter-Finals
Kuwait Premier League	Al-Salmiya	Quarter-Finals
Kuwait Premier League	Fahaheel	Quarter-Finals
Kuwait Premier League	Al Nasr	Quarter-Finals
Kuwait Premier League	Kazma	Quarter-Finals
Kuwait Premier League	Al-Jahra	Quarter-Finals
Kuwait Premier League	Al-Tadamon	Quarter-Finals
Kuwait Premier League	Al-Shabab	Quarter-Finals
Kuwaiti Division One	Burgan	Quarter-Finals
Kuwaiti Division One	Al-Yarmouk	Quarter-Finals
Kuwaiti Division One	Al-Sahel	Quarter-Finals
Kuwaiti Division One	Khaitan	Quarter-Finals
Kuwaiti Division One	Al-Sulaibikhat	Quarter-Finals
Kuwaiti Division One	Al-Jazeera	Preliminary-Round
Kuwaiti Division One	Al-Shamiya	Preliminary-Round
Kuwaiti Division One	Sporty	Preliminary-Round

== Preliminary-Round ==
26 January 2026 1	Sporty	2–1	Al-Shamiya	Mishref
17:20				Stadium: Abdullah Alkhalifa Alsabah Stadium

31 January 2026 2	Al-Jazeera	5–1 (a.e.t.)	Sporty	Farwaniya
17:20				Stadium: Farwaniya Stadium

== Round of 16 ==
12 February 2026 3	Fahaheel	3–2	Al-Shabab

12 February 2026 3	Al Nasr	3–2	Al-Yarmouk

13 February 2026 3	Al-Tadamon	1–0 (a.e.t.)	Al-Jahra

13 February 2026 3	Kazma	1–1 (a.e.t.) (1-3 p)	Khaitan

14 February 2026 3	Al-Salmiya	2–1	Al-Sulaibikhat

27 February 2026 3	Al-Qadsia	2–0	Burgan

15 February 2026 3	Al-Kuwait	3–2	Al-Jazeera

15 February 2026 3	Al Arabi	2–0	Al-Sahel
	Fadiga 17'; Al-Awadhi 90+8'

== Quarter Finals ==
27 February 2026 4	Al-Kuwait	3–0	Al Nasr

TBD 4	Al-Qadsia	v	Fahaheel

TBD 4	Al Arabi	v	Khaitan

TBD 4	Al-Salmiya	v	Al-Tadamon
