= 2025–26 Kuwait Crown Prince Cup =

Tournament details
- Country: Kuwait
- Dates: 21 November 2025 – 18 May 2026
- Teams: 18

Final positions
- Champions: Al-Arabi (10th title)
- Runners-up: Kuwait

Tournament statistics
- Matches played: 17
- Goals scored: 52 (3.06 per match)
- Top goal scorer: Zaid Qunbar (4 goals)

The 2025–26 Kuwait Crown Prince Cup was the 32nd edition of the Kuwait Crown Prince Cup. Kuwait SC are the defending champions winning 2024–25 edition over Al-Arabi 1–0 after extra time. this edition sees two new teams participating Al-Shamiya FC and Sporty FC, making a total of 18 teams this edition.

== Participating teams ==
League	Club	stage
Kuwait Premier League	Al-Kuwait	Quarter-Finals
Kuwait Premier League	Al Arabi	Quarter-Finals
Kuwait Premier League	Al-Qadsia	Quarter-Finals
Kuwait Premier League	Al-Salmiya	Quarter-Finals
Kuwait Premier League	Fahaheel	Quarter-Finals
Kuwait Premier League	Al Nasr	Quarter-Finals
Kuwait Premier League	Kazma	Quarter-Finals
Kuwait Premier League	Khaitan	Quarter-Finals
Kuwait Premier League	Al-Yarmouk	Quarter-Finals
Kuwait Premier League	Al-Tadamon	Quarter-Finals
Kuwaiti Division One	Burgan	Quarter-Finals
Kuwaiti Division One	Al-Jahra	Quarter-Finals
Kuwaiti Division One	Al-Sahel	Quarter-Finals
Kuwaiti Division One	Al-Sulaibikhat	Quarter-Finals
Kuwaiti Division One	Al-Shabab	Quarter-Finals
Kuwaiti Division One	Al-Jazeera	Preliminary-Round
Kuwaiti Division One	Al-Shamiya	Preliminary-Round
Kuwaiti Division One	Sporty	Preliminary-Round

== Preliminary-Round ==
21 November 2025 1	Sporty	1–3	Al-Shamiya	Mishref
17:20	Al-Tamimi 12'		Al-Dawsari 17'; Al-Jad’an 77' 89'	Stadium: Abdullah Alkhalifa Alsabah Stadium

27 November 2025 2	Al-Jazeera	5–2	Al-Shamiya	Farwaniya
17:20	Fernando 27'; Barak 37' 45'; Al-Rajhi 51'; Matheus 70'		Al-Enzi 48'; Al-Jad’an 87'	Stadium: Farwaniya Stadium

== Round of 16 ==
7 January 2026 3	Al Arabi	2-1	Al-Yarmouk
17:20	Anayo Iwuala 48' Zaid Qunbar 51' (pen.)		Bin Essa 73' (pen.)

7 January 2026 4	Al-Shabab	0-2	Al-Qadsia
17:20			Ablaye Mbengue 33' Athbi Shehab 36'

5 January 2026 5	Fahaheel	1-0	Al-Jazeera
17:20	Vitor 45'

4 January 2026 6	Al-Sulaibikhat	2-2 (a.e.t.) (4–3 p)	Kazma
17:20	Ali Hussain 90+4' Mechel Delima 102'		Al-Khaldi 19' Bouresli 120+1'

6 January 2026 7	Al-Kuwait	3-0	Khaitan
16:20	Marhoon 45+2'; Daham 67'; Amro 87' (pen.)

5 January 2026 8	Burgan	2-0	Al-Jahra
17:20	Al-Shammari 84' Al-Sehali 89'

6 January 2026 9	Al-Salmiya	1-2	Al-Tadamon
19:20	Al-Eniezan 64'		Fahad Al-Rashidi 81' Hamed Al-Rashidi 90+4'

4 January 2026 10	Al Nasr	1-0 (a.e.t.)	Al-Sahel
17:20	Dhahi Al-Shammari 93'

== Quarter-Final ==
11 January 2026 11	Al-Arabi	2-0	Qadsia
19:20	Zaid Qunbar 46'; Yousef Majed 95'

11 January 2026 12	Fahaheel	3-0	Al-Sulaibikhat
16:20	Al-Shareeda 6'; Vitor 14'; Al-Doukhi 55'

10 January 2026 13	Al-Kuwait	3-0	Burgan
16:20	Zayid 26'; Nasser 62'; Al-Sanousi 67'

10 January 2026 14	Al-Tadamon	0-4	Al Nasr
19:20			Al-Habasi 14' 48'; Al-Mubailish 78' 82'

== Semi-Final ==
19 January 2026 15	Al-Arabi	2-0	Fahaheel
17:20	Qunbar 51'; John 60'

19 January 2026 16	Al-Kuwait	3-2	Al Nasr
17:20	Amro 48'; Binrahma 55'; Frieh 84'		Y.Mohammed 25'; A. Al-Khaldi 60'

== Final ==
18 May 2026 17	Al-Arabi	3-0	Kuwait
19:20	Mohammed Khaled 53'; Ali Khalaf 80'; Zaid Qunbar 90'			Referee: Mario Escobar (Guatemala)
