= 2024–25 Kuwait Crown Prince Cup =

Tournament details
- Country: Kuwait
- Dates: 6 March 2025 – 19 May 2025
- Teams: 16

Final positions
- Champions: Kuwait SC (10th title)
- Runners-up: Al-Arabi

The 2024–25 Kuwait Crown Prince Cup was the 31st edition of the Kuwait Crown Prince Cup.

== Participating teams ==
League	Club
Kuwait Premier League	Al-Kuwait
Kuwait Premier League	Al Arabi
Kuwait Premier League	Al-Qadsia
Kuwait Premier League	Al-Salmiya
Kuwait Premier League	Fahaheel
Kuwait Premier League	Al Naser
Kuwait Premier League	Kazma
Kuwait Premier League	Khaitan
Kuwait Premier League	Al-Yarmouk
Kuwait Premier League	Al-Tadamon
Kuwaiti Division One	Burgan
Kuwaiti Division One	Al-Jahra
Kuwaiti Division One	Al-Sahel
Kuwaiti Division One	Al-Sulaibikhat
Kuwaiti Division One	Al-Shabab
No League	Al-Jazeera

== Round of 16 ==
6 March 2025	Kuwait	5–0	Al-Tadamon	Kuwait City
21:25	Daham 13' 56' 76'; Al-Dhefiri 81'; Amro 86'			Stadium: Sabah Al Salem Stadium

6 March 2025	Sulaibikhat	0–0 (1–4 p)	Khaitan	Al Farwaniyah
21:25				Stadium: Ali Sabah Al-Salem Stadium

7 March 2025	Kazma	3–1	Al-Yarmouk	Salmiya
21:25				Stadium: Thamir Stadium

7 March 2025	Burgan	1–5 (a.e.t.)	Al-Salmiya	Adailiya
21:25				Stadium: Al-Sadaqua Walsalam Stadium

8 March 2025	Al-Fahaheel	2–0	Al-Shabab	Khaitan
21:25				Stadium: Khaitan Stadium

2 April 2025	Al-Jahra	2–1	Al-Jazeera	Mishref, Kuwait
18:30	Al-Shammeri 16'; Zakari 90+8'		Sassi 90+4'	Stadium: Abdullah Alkhalifa Alsabah Stadium

31 March 2025	Qadsia	1–0	Al-Nasr	Adailiya
18:30	Al Mutawa 83'			Stadium: Al-Sadaqua Walsalam Stadium

1 April 2025	Al-Arabi	2–1	Al-Sahel	Al Farwaniyah
18:30	Khabba 16' 31'		Cessi 48'	Stadium: Ali Sabah Al-Salem Stadium

== Round of 8 ==
23 April 2025	Al-Jahra	1–6	Kuwait
			Jabrane 9'; Abujabarah 18'; Frieh 25'; Amro 65'; Daham 75'; Ahmad Zanki 90'

23 April 2025	Kazma	3–0	Khaitan
	Al-Qaisi 12' 58'; Sokari 89'

24 April 2025	Al-Arabi	3–0	Al-Fahaheel
	Khabba 32' 70'; John 90+1'

24 April 2025	Al-Salmiya	1–3	Qadsia
	Al Louati 82'		Shehab 12'; Dehiri 61'; Khafi 71'

== Round of 4 ==
28 April 2025	Kazma	2–4	Kuwait
	Al-Awadat 16'; Al-Qaisi 37'		Khenissi 45+5' 73'; Jabrane 60'; Yousef Nasser 90'

28 April 2025	Al-Arabi	1–0	Qadsia
	Kamil 29'

== The Final ==
19 May 2025	Kuwait	1 – 0 (a.e.t.)	Al-Arabi
	Jabrane 120+1'	Report
