= Football in Kuwait =

- Country: Kuwait
- Governing body: Kuwait Football Association
- National team: men's national team

National competitions
- Kuwait Premier League; Kuwait Division One

Club competitions
- Kuwait Emir Cup; Kuwait Crown Prince Cup; Kuwait Super Cup

International competitions
- Champions League Elite; Champions League Two; Challenge League; FIFA World Cup; Asian Cup

The Jaber Al-Ahmad International Stadium is the largest football stadium by capacity in Kuwait.

Association football is the most popular sport in Kuwait.

== Kuwait Football Association ==
The Kuwait Football Association (Arabic: الإتحاد الكويتي لكرة القدم) is headquartered in Udailiya, Al-Ittihad Street, Kuwait City.

The Kuwait Football Association (KFA) was founded in 1952.

== Tournaments ==
=== Domestic tournaments ===
- Kuwait Premier League
- Kuwait Division One
- Kuwait Emir Cup
- Kuwait Crown Prince Cup
- Kuwait Super Cup

=== Futsal ===
- Kuwaiti Futsal League
- Kuwait Futsal Federation Cup
- Kuwait Futsal Super Cup
- Mini World Futsal Club Tournament

=== Defunct ===
- Kuwait Federation Cup
- Kuwait Joint League
- Al-Khurafi Cup

=== Other tournaments held in Kuwait ===
- 1964 Arab Nations Cup
- 3rd Arabian Gulf Cup
- 1975 AFC Youth Championship
- 1980 AFC Asian Cup
- 10th Arabian Gulf Cup
- 2002 West Asian Games
- 2002 Arab Nations Cup
- 16th Arabian Gulf Cup
- 2012 WAFF Championship
- 23rd Arabian Gulf Cup
- 26th Arabian Gulf Cup

== Kuwait football achievements ==
Asian Cup

- 1 time champions of AFC Asian Cup (1980 AFC Asian Cup)
- 1 time runners-up of AFC Asian Cup (1976 AFC Asian Cup)
- 1 time third place of AFC Asian Cup (1984 AFC Asian Cup)

World Military Cup

- 2 times champions of World Military Cup (Qatar 1981, Kuwait 1983)
- 1 time runners-up of World Military Cup (Syria 1977)
- 3 times third place of World Military Cup (Congo 1973, West Germany 1975, Kuwait 1979)

== Football clubs in Kuwait ==
- Al-Arabi
- Burgan
- Fahaheel
- Ittihad Al-Shorta
- Al-Jahra
- Al-Jazeera
- Kazma
- Khaitan
- Kuwait
- Al-Nasr
- Al-Sahel
- Al-Salmiya
- Al-Shabab
- Al-Shamiya
- Sporty
- Sulaibikhat
- Qadsia
- Al-Tadhamon
- Yarmouk

== National football team ==
The Kuwait national team greatest achievement is winning the 1980 AFC Asian Cup Final. The Kuwait national team has qualified for the 1982 FIFA World Cup.

== Women's football ==
Women's football is slowly growing in Kuwait.

== Largest football stadiums in Kuwait ==
#	Stadium	Capacity	City	Home team
1	Jaber Al-Ahmad International Stadium	60,001	Ardhiya, Farwaniya Governorate	Kuwait national football team
2	Sabah Al Salem Stadium	26,000	Mansuriya, Capital	Al-Arabi
3	Mohammed Al-Hamad Stadium	25,200	Hawalli, Hawalli Governorate	Qadsia
4	Al-Sadaqua Walsalam Stadium	23,000	Adiliya, Hawalli Governorate	Kazma

== Attendances ==
The average attendance per top-flight football league season and the club with the highest average attendance:

Season	League average	Best club	Best club average
2024-25	388	Kuwait	912

Source: League page
