= 2024–25 Kuwait Emir Cup =

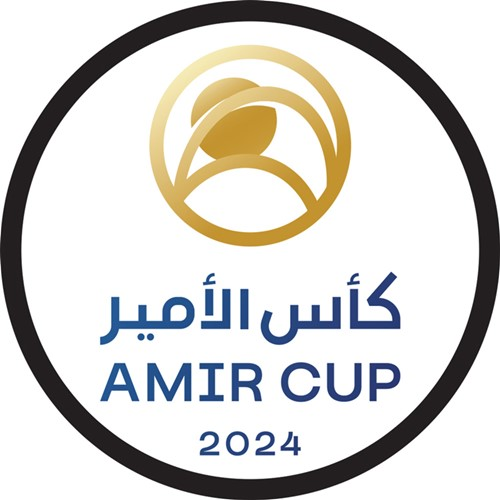

Tournament details
- Country: Kuwait
- Dates: 10 March 2025 – December 2025
- Teams: 16

Final positions
- Champions: Kuwait SC (17th title)

The 2024–25 Kuwait Emir Cup is an annual football competition and the 63rd edition of the Kuwait Emir Cup.

The Final, that was supposed to take place on June 16th 2025, was delayed because of the regional situation.

== Participating teams ==
League	Club
Kuwait Premier League	Al-Kuwait
Kuwait Premier League	Al Arabi
Kuwait Premier League	Al-Qadsia
Kuwait Premier League	Al-Salmiya
Kuwait Premier League	Fahaheel
Kuwait Premier League	Al Naser
Kuwait Premier League	Kazma
Kuwait Premier League	Khaitan
Kuwait Premier League	Al-Yarmouk
Kuwait Premier League	Al-Tadamon
Kuwaiti Division One	Burgan
Kuwaiti Division One	Al-Jahra
Kuwaiti Division One	Al-Sahel
Kuwaiti Division One	Al-Sulaibikhat
Kuwaiti Division One	Al-Shabab
No League	Al-Jazeera

== Bracket ==
Round-of-16
Al-Kuwait	3
Al-Jazeera	0
Khaitan	2
Al-Shabab	1
Al-Qadsia	3
Burgan	2
Al-Fahaheel	2
Al-Tadamon	1
Al-Arabi	2(4)
Al-Sulaibikhat	2(3)
Kazma	2
Al-Jahra	4
Al-Salmiya	3
Al-Sahel	2
Al-Nasar	1
Al-Yarmouk	0

Quarter-finals
Al-Kuwait	1
Khaitan	0
Al-Qadsia	3
Al-Fahaheel	0
Al-Arabi	2
Al-Jahra	1
Al-Salmiya	3
Al-Nasar	1

Semi-finals
Al-Kuwait	1
Al-Qadsia	0
Al-Arabi	1
Al-Salmiya	0

Final
Al-Kuwait	2
Al-Arabi	0

== Round of 16 ==
10 April 2025	Jahra	4–2	Kazma	Mishref, Kuwait
17:20				Stadium: Abdullah Alkhalifa Alsabah Stadium

10 April 2025	Al Nasr	1–0	Al-Yarmouk	Adiliya, Kuwait City
20:20				Stadium: Al-Sadaqua Walsalam Stadium

11 April 2025	Khaitan	2–1	Al-Shabab	Salmiya, Kuwait
17:20				Stadium: Thamir Stadium

11 April 2025	Al-Salmiya	3–2	Al-Sahel	Hawally, Kuwait, Kuwait
20:20				Stadium: Mohammed Al-Hamad Stadium

12 April 2025	Fahaheel	2–1	Al-Tadamon	Al Farwaniyah, Kuwait
17:20				Stadium: Ali Sabah Al-Salem Stadium

12 April 2025	Kuwait	3–0	Al-Jazeera	Kuwait City
20:20	Taha Yassine Khenissi 13' 18'; Faisal Zayid 27'			Stadium: Sabah Al Salem Stadium

21 May 2025	Qadsia	3–2	Burgan	Mishref, Kuwait
19:05				Stadium: Abdullah Alkhalifa Alsabah Stadium

23 May 2025	Al-Arabi	2–2 (a.e.t.) (4–3 p)	Sulaibikhat	Adiliya, Kuwait City
19:15	Al-Aswad 75'; Porusaniei 97'		Wielson 60'; Antonio 107'	Stadium: Al-Sadaqua Walsalam Stadium
	Penalties
	Aboud (penalty missed); Al-Aswad (penalty scored); Al-Qallaf (penalty scored); Iwuala (penalty scored); Bouchar (penalty scored)		Wielson (penalty scored); Antonio (penalty scored); Martenelli (penalty missed); Qattan (penalty missed); Kevin (penalty scored)

== Quarter finals ==
25 May 2025	Khaitan	0–1	Kuwait SC	Mishref, Kuwait
19:20			Yousef Nasser 67'	Stadium: Abdullah Alkhalifa Alsabah Stadium

25 May 2025	Fahaheel	0–3	Qadsia	Mishref, Kuwait
21:20			Mohammed Soulah 14'; Eid Al-Rashidi 17'; Ismail Khafi 33'

26 May 2025	Al-Arabi	2–1	Jahra	Kuwait
19:20	Anayo Iwuala 34'; Kamil Al-Aswad 53'		Abdulaziz Merwi 61'

26 May 2025	Al-Salmiya	3–1	Al-Nasr	Kuwait
21:20

== Semi finals ==
29 May 2025	Kuwait	1–0	Qadsia	Farwaniyah, Kuwait
20:20				Stadium: Ali Sabah Al-Salem Stadium

30 May 2025	Al-Arabi	1–0	Salmiyah	Hawally, Kuwait, Kuwait
20:20	Kamil Al-Aswad 52'			Stadium: Mohammed Al-Hamad Stadium

== Final ==
23 December 2025	Kuwait SC	2–0	Al-Arabi	Farwaniyah, Kuwait
20:20				Stadium: Jaber Al-Ahmad International Stadium
