= 2018 Kuwait Emir Cup =

Tournament details
- Country: Kuwait
- Teams: 15

Final positions
- Champions: Kuwait
- Runners-up: Al-Arabi

Tournament statistics
- Matches played: 13
- Goals scored: 40 (3.08 per match)

The 2018 Kuwait Emir Cup was the 56th edition.

== Bracket ==
Round of 16
H	Qadsia SC	0
A	Al-Arabi SC	3
H	Al-Jahra SC	1
A	Burgan SC	3
H	Al-Salmiya SC	4
A	Kazma SC	2
A	Khaitan SC	0(9)
H	Al-Sulaibikhat SC	0(10)
A	Kuwait SC
H	N/A
A	Al-Yarmouk SC	1
H	Al-Sahel SC	3
A	Al-Shabab SC	0
H	Al-Nasr SC	2
H	Al Tadhamon SC	1
A	Al-Fahaheel FC	3

Quarter-finals
A	Al-Arabi SC	1
H	Burgan SC	0
A	Al-Salmiya SC	2
H	Al-Sulaibikhat SC	0
H	Kuwait SC	6
A	Al-Sahel SC	0
H	Al-Nasr SC	4
A	Al-Fahaheel FC	1

Semi-finals
A	Al-Arabi SC	1 (3)
H	Al-Salmiya SC	1 (1)
H	Kuwait SC	1
A	Al-Nasr SC	0

Final
–	Al-Arabi SC	0
–	Kuwait SC	3

Note: H: Home team, A: Away team

== Round of 16 ==
25-4-2018	Qadsia SC (Kuwait)	0–3	Al-Arabi SC (Kuwait)	Jaber Al-Ahmad International Stadium

25-4-2018	Kazma SC (Kuwait)	4–2	Al-Salmiya SC (Kuwait)	Mohammed Al-Hamad Stadium

26-4-2018	Al-Jahra SC (Kuwait)	1–3	Burgan SC (Kuwait)	Mubarak Al-Aiar Stadium

26-4-2018	Al-Fahaheel FC (Kuwait)	3–1	Al Tadhamon SC (Kuwait)	Farwaniya Stadium

26-4-2018	Khaitan SC (Kuwait)	0–0 (a.e.t.) (9-10 p)	Al-Sulaibikhat SC (Kuwait)	Farwaniya Stadium

26-4-2018	Al-Nasr SC (Kuwait)	2–0	Al-Shabab SC (Kuwait)	Ali Sabah Al-Salem Stadium

26-4-2018	Al-Yarmouk SC (Kuwait)	1–3	Al-Sahel (Kuwait)	Mishref Stadium

== Quarter-final ==
30-4-2018	Al-Arabi SC (Kuwait)	1–0	Burgan SC (Kuwait)	Al-Sadaqua Walsalam Stadium

30-4-2018	Al-Sulaibikhat SC (Kuwait)	0–2	Al-Salmiya SC (Kuwait)	Al Kuwait Sports Club Stadium

30-4-2018	Kuwait SC	6–0	Al-Sahel (Kuwait)	Sabah Al Salem Stadium

30-4-2018	Al-Nasr SC (Kuwait)	4–1	Al-Fahaheel FC (Kuwait)	Mohammed Al-Hamad Stadium

== Semi-final ==
4-5-2018	Al-Arabi SC (Kuwait)	1–1 (a.e.t.) (3-1 p)	Al-Salmiya SC (Kuwait)	Al Kuwait Sports Club Stadium

4-5-2018	Kuwait SC	1–0	Al-Nasr SC (Kuwait)	Al-Sadaqua Walsalam Stadium

== Final ==
8-5-2018	Al-Arabi SC (Kuwait)	0–3	Kuwait SC	Jaber Al-Ahmad International Stadium
				Attendance: 23,465

== Awards ==
=== Top scorer ===
Number	Player	Club	Goals
1	Hussain Al-Moussawi	Al-Arabi SC	4
1	Yaqoub Al-Tararwa	Kuwait SC	4
2	Odai Al-Saify	Al-Salmiya SC	3
3	Firas Al-Khatib	Al-Salmiya SC	2
