= 2018–19 Kuwaiti Division One =

Kuwaiti Division One
- Season: 2018–19
- Champions: Al-Yarmouk SC
- Promoted: Al-Yarmouk SC; Al-Sahel SC (Kuwait)
- Matches: 40
- Goals: 123 (3.08 per match)

The 2018–19 Kuwaiti Division One was the second tier of Kuwaiti football. A total of five clubs participated in the championship. Al-Yarmouk won the title, and both Al-Yarmouk and Al-Sahel were promoted to the Premier League.

== Background ==
For the 2018–19 season, the Premier League was enlarged to ten clubs by the Kuwait Football Association, which decided that two clubs would be relegated and two clubs would be promoted each season.

Thus, Al-Tadamon was spared relegation. On 22 April 2018, Al-Jahra beat Al-Fahaheel 6–0 in the promotion/relegation playoff. However, Al-Fahaheel were promoted later because of the expansion.

The 2017–18 champions Al-Shabab were also promoted. This resulted in five clubs for this season, as opposed to the seven in the 2017–18 season.

== Season ==
The 2018–19 season was sponsored as the VIVA First Division and ran over 20 rounds, with each club playing 16 matches.

Five clubs participated in this season: Al-Yarmouk, Al-Sahel, Sulaibikhat, Khaitan, and Burgan.

On 22 February 2019, Al-Yarmouk beat Burgan 2–0 with goals scored by Hashem Adnan and Ali Abdul Rasul, going top on 29 points and securing promotion. Coach Hani Al-Saqer said promotion had been the club's main goal for the season.

In the same round, Al-Sahel beat Sulaibikhat 3–1 with two goals from Walid Faleh and one from Junior, moving the club to second on 23 points.

In the final round on 28 April 2019, Al-Yarmouk beat Burgan 3–1, with goals from Ali Hassan, Hussein Al-Gharib, and Adhbi Shehab. The club finished on 38 points, returning to the top flight after several years away. Burgan finished bottom on 14 points.

Ibrahim Al-Ansari, Kuwait Football Association board member, and Mohammed Al-Otaibi, competitions committee member, presented the shield. Runners-up Al-Sahel were also honored.

Al-Yarmouk won the title and Al-Sahel finished second, advancing both clubs to the Kuwait Premier League for the 2019–20 season.

== League table ==
The teams and their classifications were as follows:

| Pos | Team | Pld | W | D | L | GF | GA | GD | Pts | Promotion |
|---|---|---|---|---|---|---|---|---|---|---|
| 1 | Al-Yarmouk | 16 | 12 | 2 | 2 | 33 | 13 | +20 | 38 | Promoted to the Premier League |
| 2 | Al-Sahel | 16 | 8 | 2 | 6 | 25 | 22 | +3 | 26 | Promoted to the Premier League |
| 3 | Sulaibikhat | 16 | 8 | 0 | 8 | 25 | 31 | −6 | 24 | |
| 4 | Khaitan | 16 | 4 | 2 | 10 | 20 | 24 | −4 | 14 | |
| 5 | Burgan | 16 | 4 | 2 | 10 | 20 | 33 | −13 | 14 | |
