= 2019 Kuwait Emir Cup =

Tournament details
- Country: Kuwait
- Teams: 15

Final positions
- Champions: Kuwait SC
- Runners-up: Qadsia SC

Tournament statistics
- Matches played: 14
- Goals scored: 49 (3.5 per match)

The 2019 Kuwait Emir Cup is the 57th edition, Kuwait SC are the defending champions.

== Pots ==
Pot A
Al-Arabi SC
Al Tadhamon SC
Kazma SC
Al-Sulaibikhat SC
Al-Yarmouk SC
Khaitan SC
Qadsia SC
Al-Nasr SC

Pot B
Al-Salmiya SC
Al-Sahel SC
Al-Jahra SC
Al-Shabab SC
Kuwait SC
Burgan SC
Al-Fahaheel FC

== Round 1 ==
=== Pot A ===
28 March 2019	Qadsia SC	1–0 (a.e.t.)	Al-Nasr SC

28 March 2019	Al-Arabi SC	5–2	Al Tadhamon SC
	Hussain Al-Musawi 10', 17', 62', 76'

28 March 2019	Kazma SC	1–0	Al-Sulaibikhat SC

28 March 2019	Khaitan SC	5–0	Al-Yarmouk SC

=== Pot B ===
29 March 2019	Al-Salmiya SC	4–1 (a.e.t.)	Al-Sahel SC

29 March 2019	Al-Jahra SC	2–3 (a.e.t.)	Al-Shabab SC

29 March 2019	Al-Fahaheel FC	1–2	Burgan SC

== Quarter-finals ==
5 April 2019	Khaitan SC	3–2	Al-Arabi SC

5 April 2019	Kazma SC	1–1 (a.e.t.) (4–5 p)	Qadsia SC

6 April 2019	Al-Salmiya SC	1–1 (a.e.t.) (2–3 p)	Kuwait SC

6 April 2019	Al-Shabab SC	1–3 (a.e.t.)	Burgan SC

== Semi-finals ==
10 April 2019	Qadsia SC	2–0	Khaitan SC

11 April 2019	Kuwait SC	5–0	Burgan SC

== Final ==
23 April 2019

Qadsia SC	0–2	Kuwait SC

Jaber Al-Ahmad International Stadium, Kuwait City
Attendance: 22,000
