= 2017–18 Kuwaiti Division One =

Kuwaiti Division One
- Season: 2017–18
- Champions: Al-Shabab SC (5th title)
- Matches: 63
- Goals: 175 (2.78 per match)

32nd edition of the tournament after 2012-2013 season, after the split of the Kuwaiti Premier League, which Burgan SC debuts in the tournament.

== Teams ==
=== Lists of teams and locations ===
Team	Based	Home stadium	Capacity
Al Fahaheel	Kuwait City	Fahaheel Stadium	2,000
Al Sahel	Abu Hulayfah	Abu Halifa City Stadium	2,000
Al Sulaibikhat	Sulaibikhat	Al Salibikhaet Stadium	7,000
Al Shabab	Al Ahmadi	Al-Ahmadi Stadium	18,000
Yarmouk	Mishref	Mishref Stadium	12,000
Burgan	Al Farwaniyah	Ali Sabah Al-Salem Stadium	10,000
Khaitan	Khaitan	Khaitan Stadium	10,000

=== Personnel and sponsorship ===
Team	Chairman	Head coach	Captain	Kit manufacturer	Shirt sponsor
Al-Fahaheel	Mohammed Hammad	Andrey Chernyshov	Abdullah Al Enazi	Givova	none
Khaitan SC		Aleksandar Dixon Jovanovski		Zeus	Samsung
Sahel				Zeus	Viva
Al-Sulaibikhat			Mohammad Al Dabous	Erreà	LG
Al-Shabab				Uhlsport	None
Al-Yarmouk SC				Adidas	Samsung
Burgan SC	Hamlan Al-Hamlan	Hamad Al Harbi	Tarik Lugman	adidas	none

== Table ==
Pos	Team	Pld	W	D	L	GF	GA	GD	Pts	Qualification or relegation
1	Al-Shabab SC	18	10	4	4	37	22	+15	34	Promotion to Kuwaiti Premier League
2	Al-Fahaheel FC	18	9	5	4	32	23	+9	32	Play off of Kuwaiti Premier League
3	Al-Yarmouk SC	18	9	3	6	33	22	+11	30	
4	Burgan SC	18	7	5	6	28	24	+4	26	
5	Al-Sulaibikhat SC	18	5	8	5	29	31	−2	23	
6	Al Sahel SC	18	4	4	10	16	34	−18	16	
7	Khaitan SC	18	2	5	11	15	35	−20	11	

Updated to match(es) played on 10 April 2018. Source: FIFA
Rules for classification: 1) Points; 2) Goal difference; 3) Goals scored; 4) Head-to-head points; 5) Head-to-head goal difference; 6) Head-to-head goals scored

== Play-Off ==
In this Seasons Play-Off match to determine who's the 8th team of the 2018–19 Kuwaiti Premier League, Is between Al-Jahra SC and Al-Fahaheel FC

22 April 2018	Al-Jahra SC	6 – 0	Al-Fahaheel FC	Kuwait City, Kuwait
