= 2026–27 Kuwaiti Premier League =

Kuwaiti Premier League
- Season: 2026–27
- Dates: 25 August 2026 – 30 May 2027
- Matches: 45
- Goals: 147 (3.27 per match)
- Top goalscorer: (Bahrain) Mohamed Marhoon (6 goals)
- Biggest home win: Kuwait 7–0 Sulaibikhat (19 October)
- Biggest away win: Al-Nasr 1–7 Kuwait (9 October)
- Highest scoring: Al-Tadhamon 2–6 Kuwait (23 October); Al-Nasr 1–7 Kuwait (9 October)
- Longest winning run: Kuwait (6 games)
- Longest unbeaten run: Kuwait (7 games)
- Longest winless run: Sulaibikhat (8 games)
- Longest losing run: Al-Tadamon (6 games)
- All statistics correct as of 22 November 2026.

The 2026–27 Kuwaiti Premier League (also known as Zain Premier League) is the 65th edition of the Kuwait Premier League, the top-tier of Kuwaiti football, since being established in 1961. Kuwait are the 5-time defending champions.

Kuwait are the defending champions.

The draw took place on 10 August 2026.

== Teams ==
12 teams will compete in the league – all 10 teams from the previous season and the 2 teams promoted from the Division One.

=== Club changes ===
==== To Premier League ====
Promoted from the Kuwaiti Division One

- Al-Sahel
- Sulaibikhat

==== From Premier League ====
Relegated to the Kuwaiti Division One

No team was relegated due to the federation expanding the league to 12 teams.

== Foreign players ==
| Team | Player 1 | Player 2 | Player 3 | Player 4 | Player 5 |
|---|---|---|---|---|---|
| Al-Arabi | (Nigeria) Anayo Iwuala | (Ethiopia) Kenean Markneh | (Netherlands) Walid Ould-Chikh | (Senegal) Khadim Rassoul | (Palestine) Zaid Qunbar |
| Fahaheel | (Brazil) Vitor Vieira | (Brazil) Carlos Perino | (Ethiopia) Gatoch Panom | (Cape Verde) Alvin Fortes | (South Africa) Ranga Chivaviro |
| Al-Jahra | (Cameroon) Christ Afalna | (Brazil) Luisinho | (Ghana) Evans Ampofo | (Brazil) Marcos Ramos | (Cameroon) Tchamba Ngassam |
| Kazma | (Germany) Törles Knöll | (Algeria) Drice Chaabi | (Brazil) Patrick | (Senegal) Amath Ndaw | (Yemen) Nasser Al-Gahwashi |
| Kuwait | (Tunisia) Taha Yassine Khenissi | (Bahrain) Mohamed Marhoon | (Cameroon) Oumar Gonzalez | (Morocco) El Mehdi Barrahma | (Democratic Republic of the Congo) Arsène Zola |
| Al-Nasr | (Mali) Moriba Diarra | (Sudan) Abdelrahman Kuku | (Tunisia) Hazem Haj Hassen | (Mauritania) Yacoub Sidi Ethmane | (Algeria) Ayman Lekjaa |
| Al-Sahel | (Brazil) Cleiton de Jesus | (Brazil) Alan D'Souza | (Brazil) Maurico Oliveria | (Brazil) João Moura | (Brazil) Lucas Araujo |
| Al-Salmiya | (Gabon) David Sambissa | (Uzbekistan) Shakhzod Azmiddinov | (Democratic Republic of the Congo) Trésor Tshibwabwa | (Bahrain) Abdulla Yusuf Helal | (Syria) Mahmoud Al Aswad |
| Al-Shabab | (Brazil) Mateus Totô | (Brazil) Marcos Martinelli | (Brazil) Geovani Silva | (Brazil) Michel Ângelo | (Brazil) Marcelo Lima |
| Sulaibikhat | (Brazil) Welves | (Brazil) Bruno Domingues | (Brazil) Elielson Bebê | (Brazil) Lucas Shallon | (Brazil) Leonardo Sheldon |
| Qadsia | (Morocco) Hamza Khabba | (Morocco) Ayoub Lakhdar | (Oman) Abdulrahman Al-Mushaifri | (Ivory Coast) Cedrik Gbo | (Nigeria) Gabriel Orok |
| Al-Tadamon | (Brazil) Marlon Santos | (Ivory Coast) Aboubacar Doumbia | (Ivory Coast) Pierre Zebli | (Syria) Ahmed Al-Dali | (Niger) Zakariya Souleymane |

== League table ==
| Pos | Team | Pld | W | D | L | GF | GA | GD | Pts | Qualification or relegation |
|---|---|---|---|---|---|---|---|---|---|---|
| 1 | Kuwait | 7 | 6 | 1 | 0 | 28 | 6 | +22 | 19 | Qualification for AFC Champions League Two Group Stage |
| 2 | Qadsia | 7 | 5 | 0 | 2 | 12 | 5 | +7 | 15 | Qualification for AFC Champions League Two preliminary stage |
| 3 | Kazma | 7 | 4 | 2 | 1 | 12 | 8 | +4 | 14 | Qualification for the Arab Club Champions Cup group stage |
| 4 | Al-Nasr | 8 | 4 | 1 | 3 | 13 | 17 | −4 | 13 (Note: Head-to-head points: Al-Nasr 3 pts, Al-Salmiya 0 pts. Al-Nasr finished ahead of Al-Salmiya on head-to-head points: Al-Salmiya 1–2 Al-Nasr) | Qualification for the GFF Gulf Club Champions League group stage |
| 5 | Al-Salmiya | 7 | 4 | 1 | 2 | 10 | 8 | +2 | 13 | |
| 6 | Al-Arabi | 7 | 3 | 3 | 1 | 15 | 10 | +5 | 12 | |
| 7 | Fahaheel | 8 | 3 | 1 | 4 | 14 | 12 | +2 | 10 | |
| 8 | Al-Shabab | 8 | 2 | 2 | 4 | 11 | 17 | −6 | 8 | |
| 9 | Al-Jahra | 8 | 2 | 1 | 5 | 8 | 9 | −1 | 7 | |
| 10 | Al-Tadamon | 8 | 2 | 0 | 6 | 11 | 22 | −11 | 6 | |
| 11 | Sulaibikhat | 8 | 0 | 5 | 3 | 9 | 18 | −9 | 5 | Relegation to Kuwaiti Division One |
| 12 | Al-Sahel | 7 | 1 | 1 | 5 | 3 | 14 | −11 | 4 | Relegation to Kuwaiti Division One |

Updated to match(es) played on 22 November 2026. Source:
Rules for classification: 1) Points; 2) Head-to-head points; 3.1) Head-to-head goal difference; 3.2) Goal difference; 3.3) Goals scored; 3.4) Total wins; 3.5) Fair play score; 4) Play-offs

== Results ==
| Home \ Away | ARA | FAH | JAH | KAZ | KUW | NAS | SAH | SAL | SHA | SUL | QAD | TAD |
|---|---|---|---|---|---|---|---|---|---|---|---|---|
| Al-Arabi | | October 27 | Round 13 | Round 15 | Round 12 | November 7 | Round 10 | Postponed | May 30 | 3–3 | Round 18 | Round 20 |
| Fahaheel | Round 17 | | Round 18 | Round 20 | May 30 | Round 13 | Round 15 | Round 10 | October 18 | November 6 | 1–2 | 4–1 |
| Al-Jahra | 2–1 | October 31 | | October 19 | Round 14 | Round 20 | May 30 | Round 17 | Round 12 | Round 15 | November 7 | Round 10 |
| Kazma | October 9 | Round 9 | Round 16 | | Round 18 | Round 11 | 0–0 | Round 19 | Round 14 | October 23 | Round 21 | 3–1 |
| Kuwait | 3–3 | Round 11 | 1–0 | Postponed | | Round 15 | Round 19 | Round 9 | Round 21 | 6–0 | Round 13 | Round 17 |
| Al-Nasr | Round 19 | 2–1 | Round 9 | May 30 | October 9 | | Round 17 | Round 12 | November 1 | Round 10 | Round 14 | October 18 |
| Al-Sahel | Round 21 | October 11 | Round 11 | Round 13 | November 8 | October 24 | | Round 14 | Round 9 | 1–0 | Round 16 | Round 18 |
| Al-Salmiya | Round 16 | Round 21 | October 24 | November 8 | Round 20 | 1–2 | 1–0 | | October 10 | Round 18 | Round 11 | Round 13 |
| Al-Shabab | Round 11 | Round 16 | 3–2 | 2–3 | Round 10 | Round 18 | Round 20 | Round 15 | | Round 13 | October 27 | November 6 |
| Sulaibikhat | Round 14 | Round 19 | October 11 | Round 17 | Round 16 | Round 21 | Round 12 | October 30 | 1–1 | | Round 9 | Round 11 |
| Qadsia | October 31 | Round 12 | Round 19 | Round 10 | 0–1 | 3–0 | Postponed | May 30 | Round 17 | Round 20 | | Round 15 |
| Al-Tadamon | Round 9 | Round 14 | Round 21 | Round 12 | October 23 | Round 16 | October 30 | 0–2 | Round 19 | May 30 | October 10 | |

Updated to match(es) played on 6 September 2026. Source:
Legend: Blue = home team win; Yellow = draw; Red = away team win.

== Statistics ==
=== Top scorers ===
As of 6 September 2026

| Rank | Player | Team | Goals |
|---|---|---|---|
| 1 | (Bahrain) Mohamed Marhoon | Kuwait | 4 |
| 2 | (Brazil) Mateus Totô | Al-Shabab | 3 |
| 2 | (Brazil) Vitor Vieira | Fahaheel | 3 |
| 2 | (Oman) Abdulrahman Al-Mushaifri | Qadsia | 3 |
| 2 | (Kuwait) Yousef Nasser | Kuwait | 3 |

==== Hat-tricks ====
As of 6 September 2026

| Player | Team | Result | Date | Goals |
|---|---|---|---|---|
| Yousef Nasser | Kuwait | 6–0 | 19 October 2026 | 3 |

== Awards ==
As of 6 September 2026

=== Round awards ===
| Round | Player of the Round | |
| Round | Player | Club |
|---|---|---|
| 1 | Shabaib Al-Khaldi | Kazma |
| 2 | Abdullah Al-Dahis | Al-Jahra |
| 3 | Shabaib Al-Khaldi | Kazma |
| 4 | | |
| 5 | | |
| 6 | | |
| 7 | | |
| 8 | | |
| 9 | | |
| 10 | | |
| 11 | | |
| 12 | | |
| 13 | | |
| 14 | | |
| 15 | | |
| 16 | | |
| 17 | | |
| 18 | | |
| 19 | | |
| 20 | | |
| 21 | | |
| 22 | | |

== See also ==
- 2026–27 Kuwaiti Division One
- 2026–27 Kuwait Super Cup
- 2026–27 Kuwait Emir Cup
- 2026–27 Kuwait Crown Prince Cup
- 2026–27 AFC Champions League Two
- 2026–27 AFC Challenge League
- 2026–27 AGCFF Gulf Club Champions League
