= 2011 Kuwait Crown Prince Cup =

The 2011 Kuwaiti Crown Prince Cup was a cup competition involving teams from the Kuwaiti Premier League and the Kuwaiti Division One league. It was again moved to the end of the domestic league campaign after being held in mid season last year.

The 2011 edition was the 18th edition to be held.

== First round ==
12 teams play a knockout tie. 6 clubs advance to the next round.

Tie no	Home team	Score	Away team
1	Al Naser	1 – 3	Khaitan
2	Tadamon	0 - 1	Al Fahaheel
3	Al Yarmouk	0 - 7	Al Arabi
4	Al Salmiya	0 - 3	Al Shabab
5	Al Jahra	1 - 0	Kazma Sporting Club
6	Sahel	1 - 4	Sulaibikhat

== Quarter-finals ==
8 teams play a knockout tie. 4 clubs advance to the next round.

Tie no	Home team	Score	Away team
1	Al Arabi	3 - 2	Al Jahra
2	Al Qadisiya Kuwait	1 - 2	Al Shabab
3	Sulaibikhat	1 - 2	Khaitan
4	Al Kuwait Kaifan	3 - 1	Al Fahaheel

== Semi-finals ==
4 teams play a knockout tie. Winners advance to the final

Tie no	Home team	Score	Away team
1	Al Arabi	1 - 2	Al Kuwait Kaifan
2	Khaitan	1 - 0	Al Shabab

== Final ==
Al Kuwait Kaifan won the final on May 17.

Tie no	Home team	Score	Away team
1	Al Kuwait Kaifan	2 - 1	Khaitan
