= 2025–26 Kuwaiti Division One =

Kuwaiti Division One
- Season: 2025–26
- Dates: 14 September 2025 – 20 August 2026
- Champions: Sulaibikhat
- Promoted: Sulaibikhat; Al-Sahel

40th edition of the tournament.

Al-Jazeera make their debut in the Kuwaiti Football League alongside Sporty and Al-Shamiya.

On July 21st 2025, it was announced that the Ministry of Interior had applied to join the Kuwaiti Division One and both domestic cup competitions. A week later Sporty and Al-Shamiya officially joined the league.

On August 3rd 2025, it was announced that the acceptance period for privately owned clubs will end on August 25th, 2025.

On 28 February, the Minister of Youth Affairs Tariq Al-Jalahma announced the full suspension of all sporting activities, including the league, for undetermined period due the Iranian strikes on Kuwait.

On 3 June, the league fixtures were announced to be continued between the 25th of July and the 20th of August.

== Changes ==
The following teams have changed divisions since the 2025 season:

=== To Division One ===
Relegated from Kuwait Premier League

- Khaitan
- Yarmouk

=== From Division One ===
Promoted to Kuwait Premier League

- Al-Jahra
- Al-Shabab

=== New Clubs ===
- Al-Jazeera
- Sporty
- Al-Shamiya

== Teams ==
=== Stadia and locations ===
Club	City/Town	Stadium	Capacity
Burgan	Ardiya	Ali Al-Salem Stadium	10,000
Al-Jazeera	Al Ahmadi	Al-Ahmadi Stadium	18,000
Khaitan	Khaitan	Khaitan Stadium	10,000
Al-Sahel	Abu Halifa	Abu Halifa City Stadium	5,000
Al-Shamiya			
Sporty			
Sulaibikhat	Sulaibikhat	Al Sulaibikhat Stadium	7,000
Yarmouk	Mishref	Abdullah Alkhalifa Satduim	12,000

== Kits ==
Team	Kit manufacturer	Shirt sponsor
Burgan	Wolves Sport	None
Al-Jazeera	VS Sports	Platinum; KUWAITNET
Khaitan	Kelme	None
Al-Sahel	HH Sports	None
Al-Shamiya	Erreà	None
Sporty	Scorpion	None
Sulaibikhat	Wolves Sport	None
Yarmouk	Macron	None

== Main league table ==
The main league, consisting of 8 teams in which the top two clubs get promoted.

Pos	Team	Pld	W	D	L	GF	GA	GD	Pts	Promotion
1	Sulaibikhat (C)	21	13	5	3	38	16	+22	44	Promotion to the Kuwaiti Premier League
2	Al-Sahel (P)	21	13	5	3	34	16	+18	44	Promotion to the Kuwaiti Premier League
3	Yarmouk	21	13	4	4	42	20	+22	43	
4	Al-Jazeera	21	11	5	5	41	24	+17	38	
5	Khaitan	21	7	6	8	23	20	+3	27	
6	Burgan	21	5	8	8	26	30	−4	23	
7	Al-Shamiya	21	3	1	17	19	62	−43	10	
8	Sporty	21	2	0	19	14	49	−35	6	

Updated to match(es) played on 20 August 2026. Source: Flashscore
(C) Champions; (P) Promoted

== See also ==
- 2025-26 Kuwaiti Premier League
- 2025-26 Kuwait Super Cup
- 2025-26 Kuwait Emir Cup
- 2025-26 Kuwait Crown Prince Cup
