= 2009–10 Kuwaiti Division One =

Kuwaiti Division One
- Season: 2009–10

The Kuwaiti Division One was introduced for the 2008–09 season. the Al-Sahel SC and Al-Jahra SC promotion to the 2010–11 Kuwaiti Premier League

== Standings ==
Pos	Team	P	W	D	L	F	A	GD	Pts
1	Al-Sahel SC	20	10	8	2	21	12	+9	38
2	Al-Jahra SC	20	10	5	5	27	14	+13	35
3	Khaitan	20	7	7	6	26	21	+5	28
4	Al Yarmouk	20	7	6	7	32	23	+9	27
5	Al Shabab	20	3	9	8	19	27	-8	18
6	Al Fahaheel	20	3	5	7	14	42	-28	14

== Top scorers ==
Scorer	Goals	Team
Aoerson Da Costa	11	Khaitan
Rodrigo Da Costa	9	Al Yarmouk
Alex Sandro Junior	8	Al Yarmouk
Welson Antonio	7	Al-Jahra SC
