= 2007–08 Kuwaiti Division One =

Kuwaiti Division One
- Season: 2007–08

The Kuwaiti Division One was introduced for the 2006/2007 season. Both Al Shabab and Al Fahaheel claimed the top 2 spots which earned them promotion to the Kuwaiti Premier League 2008-09.

== Standings ==
Pos	Team	P	W	D	L	F	A	GD	Pts
1	Al Shabab	12	4	7	1	12	9	+3	19
2	Al Fahaheel	12	5	3	4	13	11	+2	18
3	Al-Sulaibikhat	12	5	3	4	21	21	0	18
4	Khaitan Sporting Club	12	3	5	4	17	13	+4	14
5	Al Yarmouk	12	2	4	6	10	19	-9	10

== Top scorers ==
Scorer	Goals	Team
(Kuwait) Mohammed Oda	8	Al-Sulaibikhat
(Brazil) —unspecified --	5	Al-Sulaibikhat
(Bahrain) Mohammed Salman	4	Al Fahaheel
(Somalia) Mohammed Othman	4	Khaitan Sporting Club
(Kuwait) Mansour Al Ajmi	4	Al Shabab
(Brazil) Anthony Topango	4	Al Shabab
