= 2006–07 Kuwaiti Division One =

Kuwaiti Division One
- Season: 2006–07

The Kuwaiti Division One was introduced for the 2006/2007 season. The bottom six clubs in the 2005/2006 were competing in the Kuwaiti Division One 2006–07. Both Al Naser and Al Jahra claimed the top two spots which earned them promotion to the Kuwaiti Premier League 2007-08.

== Standings ==
Pos	Team	P	W	D	L	F	A	GD	Pts
1	Al Naser	12	8	4	0	21	9	+12	28
2	Al Jahra	12	8	2	2	24	14	+10	26
3	Khaitan Sporting Club	12	5	1	6	20	17	+3	16
4	Al Yarmouk	12	2	4	6	11	20	-9	10
5	Al Shabab	12	1	1	10	11	27	-16	4

== Top scorers ==
Scorer	Goals	Team
(Ivory Coast) Brosin Traore	9	Al Naser
(Nigeria) Diok	6	Khaitan Sporting Club
(Kuwait) Hamed Ghazy	6	Khaitan Sporting Club
(Kuwait) Faisal Dakheel Al Adwani	5	Al Naser
