= Ahmad Raheel =

Kuwaiti footballer

Ahmad Raheel Al Dhufairi
Personal information
- Date of birth: February 21, 1996 (age 30)
- Place of birth: Kuwait City, Kuwait
- Height: 1.78 m (5 ft 10 in)
- Position: Defender

Team information
- Current team: Al-Fahaheel

Youth career
- 2010–2016: Al-Nasr SC

Senior career*
Years	Team	Apps	(Gls)
2015–2018	Al-Nasr SC	32	(0)
2018–2023	Al Arabi SC		
2023–2026	Al-Fahaheel		
2026–	Al Tadamon		

International career^{‡}
2018	Kuwait U-23		
2018–	Kuwait	2	(0)
- * Club domestic league appearances and goals ‡ National team caps and goals as of May 11, 2018

Ahmad Raheel Al Dhufairi (Arabic: أحمد رحيل الظفيري) is a Kuwaiti football player playing for Al-Fahaheel in the Kuwait Premier League and for the Kuwait national football team playing mainly as a defender.

== Career statistics ==
=== Club ===
As of 21 April 2018

Club	Season	League			Emir Cup		Kuwait Crown Cup		Continental		Other		Total	
Club	Season	Division	Apps	Goals	Apps	Goals	Apps	Goals	Apps	Goals	Apps	Goals	Apps	Goals
Al-Arabi SC	2017–18	VIVA Premier League	12	1	4	0	0	0	0	0	0	0	16	1
Al-Arabi SC	2018–19	VIVA Premier League	5	0	0	0	0	0	0	0	0	0	5	0
Al-Arabi SC	Total	VIVA Premier League	16	1	4	0	0	0	0	0	0	0	21	1

=== International ===
As of match played 25 May 2018.

National team	Year	Apps	Goals
Kuwait	2018	2	0
Total		2	0
