= Bader Al Samak =

Kuwaiti footballer

Personal information
- Full name: Bader Al Samak
- Date of birth: 1 January 1988 (age 38)
- Place of birth: Kuwait City, Kuwait
- Height: 1.71 m (5 ft 7 1/2 in)
- Position: Midfielder

Team information
- Current team: Al-Salmiya SC
- Number: 15

Senior career*
Years	Team	Apps	(Gls)
2007–	Al-Salmiya SC		
2010–2012	Al-Yarmouk SC (loan)		
2013–2014	Al Tadamon (loan)		

International career
	Kuwait	11	(1)
- * Club domestic league appearances and goals

Bader Al Samak (born 1 January 1988) is a professional Kuwaiti footballer. Now playing with Al-Salmiya SC as a central midfielder, he participated in the 52nd Prince Cup with Al-Salmiya SC.
