= Dhahi Al-Shammari =

Kuwaiti footballer (born 1999)

Personal information
- Full name: Dhahi Farhan Dhahi Al-Shammari
- Date of birth: 20 October 1999 (age 27)
- Place of birth: Kuwait
- Height: 1.74 m (5 ft 9 in)
- Position: Attacking midfielder

Team information
- Current team: Al-Shabab
- Number: 78

Youth career
- 2013-2018: Al-Jahra

Senior career*
Years	Team	Apps	(Gls)
2018–2020	Al-Jahra	22	(2)
2020–2021	Kuwait	19	(2)
2021-2023	Al-Jahra	18	(3)
2023	Kazma	10	(2)
2023-2025	Al-Arabi	12	(0)
2025	Al-Shabab	0	(0)
2025-	Al-Nasr	20	(2)
- * Club domestic league appearances and goals as of 3 May 2025 ‡ National team caps and goals as of 5 May 2025

Dhahi Al-Shammari (born 20 October 1999) is a Kuwaiti professional footballer who plays as a midfielder for Al-Shabab.

== Club career ==
Dhahi made his debut in the late 2018–19 season with Al-Jahra SC being a squad regular at age 20 in the clubs Kuwaiti Division One winning season in 2019-20 winning his first trophy.

At the end of the season he signed with Kuwait SC. where he played mostly as a substitute scoring 2 goals that season.

A season later he rejoined Al-Jahra SC winning them the Kuwaiti Division One once again, the club was going through management crisis and payment debts to players in late 2022 he released himself from the club and signed with Kazma SC on a short-term deal.

=== Al-Arabi ===
In June 2023 he signed with Al-Arabi on a 2-year deal. in the 2024-25 Kuwaiti Premier League final round where Kuwait SC defeated Al-Arabi he congratulated the clubs official social media posts, which struck outrage with his clubs fans. Dhahi later stated I only congratulated my former teammates and apologized to the clubs fans and stated 2 seasons in and still he didn't get a chance to play. He left the club at the end of his contract following the end of the 2024–25 season.

=== Al-Shabab ===
On June 25th 2025 Al-Shabab announced the signing of Dhahi. after 2 months with the club announced his departure.

== Honours ==
=== Al-Jahra ===
- Kuwaiti Division One: 2019–20, 2021–22

=== Kuwait SC ===
- Kuwait Emir Cup: 2020–21
- Kuwait Crown Prince Cup: 2021–21
- Kuwait Super Cup: 2020
