= Hamad Al Harbi =

Kuwaiti footballer

Hamad Hamidi Al Harbi
Personal information
- Date of birth: 7 May 1980 (age 46)
- Place of birth: Kuwait
- Position: Forward

Senior career*
| Years | Team | Apps | (Gls) |
| 1997–2005 | Al Naser | | (26) |
| 2005–2007 | Al-Salmiya SC | | (25) |
| 2006 | Al-Nahda Club (Oman)(loan) | 1 | (0) |
| 2007–2008 | Al Naser | | (1) |
| 2008-2009 | Al-Salmiya SC | | (2) |
| 2010–2011 | Al-Fahaheel FC | | (2) |
| 2011–2012 | Al-Sulaibikhat SC | | (2) |

International career
| 2004 | Kuwait | 11 | (5) |

Managerial career
- 2016–2017: Burgan SC
- * Club domestic league appearances and goals

Hamad Hamidi Al Harbi is a Kuwaiti football forward who played for Kuwait in the 2004 Asian Cup. He also played for Al-Salmiya and Al Naser. He started his career in 1997 with Al-Nasr Club and played his first match against Kazma at the age of seventeen and succeeded in scoring 13 goals in his first season (98/97). With Al-Nasr, he won the Al-Kharafi Revitalization Championship in 2000 and third place in the Crown Prince Cup competition. He moved to Salmiya in 2005 for 15,000 Kuwaiti dinars on loan for two seasons, and scored two goals in his first match against Al Sahel in the Kharafi Championship and won with Salmiya third place in this tournament. Harbi participated in the 2006 World Cup qualifiers for his country, scoring three goals.
