= Musaed Abdullah =

Kuwaiti footballer

Personal information
- Full name: Musaed Abdullah Al sulaili
- Date of birth: May 13, 1981 (age 45)
- Place of birth: Kuwait City, Kuwait
- Height: 1.80 m (5 ft 11 in)
- Position: Centre back

Youth career
- 1991: Al Salibikhaet

Senior career*
Years	Team	Apps	(Gls)
1997–1999	Al Salibikhaet	18	(2)
1999–2012	Al Arabi	96	(21)
2012–2015	Al Naser	17	(0)

International career^{‡}
2003	Kuwait	1	(0)
- * Club domestic league appearances and goals as of December 10, 2006 ‡ National team caps and goals as of December 10, 2006

Musaed Abdullah (Arabic: مساعد عبد الله) is a Kuwaiti retired footballer who played in centre back for Kuwaiti Premier League club Al Naser.

He played for Al-Arabi in the 2007 AFC Champions League group stage.
