= Jaber Al Mutairi =

Kuwaiti footballer

Personal information
- Full name: Jaber Al Mutairi
- Date of birth: 30 September 1990 (age 36)
- Place of birth: Kuwait City, Kuwait
- Height: 1.71 m (5 ft 7 1/2 in)
- Position: Midfielder

Youth career
- 1998–2009: Al Tadhamon

Senior career*
Years	Team	Apps	(Gls)
2009–2010	Al Tadhamon		
2010–2011	Salalah		
2011–2016	Qadsia		
2016–2018	Al Tadhamon		

International career
2010–2012	Kuwait U23	7	(1)
- * Club domestic league appearances and goals

Jaber Al Mutairi (born 30 September 1990) is a professional Kuwaiti footballer. His beginnings were at the Al Tadhmon SC.

== Personal life ==
Jaber younger brother, Talal, is also footballer.
