= Ismaïl Sassi =

French footballer (born 1991)

Personal information
- Full name: Ismaïl Sassi
- Date of birth: 24 December 1991 (age 34)
- Place of birth: France
- Height: 1.86 m (6 ft 1 in)
- Position: Winger

Team information
- Current team: Al-Jazeera
- Number: 26

Senior career*
Years	Team	Apps	(Gls)
2011–2013	Mantois 78	56	(12)
2013–2014	US Raon-l'Étape	16	(5)
2014–2015	Othellos Athienou	16	(4)
2015–2016	Mantois 78	14	(2)
2016–2017	AEZ Zakakiou	16	(5)
2017–2018	AEL Limassol	45	(8)
2018–2019	OFI	15	(3)
2019–2020	Lamia	10	(0)
2020–2021	Karmiotissa	31	(9)
2021–2023	Doxa Katokopias	29	(1)
2022–2023	→ Achyronas-Onisilos (loan)	28	(4)
2023	AS Marsa	2	(0)
2024–2025	Balestier Khalsa	18	(13)
2025–	Al-Jazeera	0	(0)
- * Club domestic league appearances and goals as of 2 November 2024

Ismaïl Sassi (born 24 December 1991) is a French professional footballer who plays as a winger for Kuwaiti Division One club Al-Jazeera.

== Club career ==
=== AEL Limassol ===
On 19 January 2017, Sassi signed with Cypriot club AEL Limassol. On 8 May 2017, he scored a brace in a 2–0 league win over Anorthosis

=== OFI ===
On 17 July 2018, Greek club OFI officially announced their deal with Sassi, who was released from AEL Limassol, until the summer of 2020.

=== PAS Lamia ===
On 3 September 2019, Sassi signed with the Greek club PAS Lamia for a period of one season after having terminated by mutual agreement his previous contract with the Greek club OFI.

=== Karmiotissa Polemidion ===
On 19 August 2020, Karmiotissa Polemidion announced the signing of Sassi. On 6 November 2020, he scored a brace in a 2–1 away win against Apollon Limassol.

=== Doxa Katokopias ===
Doxa Katokopias announced Sassi signing on 20 August 2021.

=== AS Marsa ===
After leaving Doxa Katokopias, Sassi signed for Tunisia club, AS Marsa in early July. However, he and the team part way mutually on 31 August 2023.

=== Balestier Khalsa ===
On 24 January 2024, Sassi moved to Southeast Asia to sign for Singapore Premier League side, Balestier Khalsa. On 5 July, he scored his first goal for the club in a 4–2 win over DPMM. On 31 August, Sassi scored his first professional career hat-trick in a 7–2 win against Young Lions. On 13 September, Sassi scored a 90+10th stoppage time equaliser to seal a 2–2 draw against DPMM at the Hassanal Bolkiah National Stadium.

=== Al-Jazeera ===
New formed club based in Kuwait announced their Signings on April 1, 2025, 1 day before their debut match in Kuwait Crown Prince Cup against Al-Jahra where he scored the club’s first ever official goal in a 1-2 defeat.

== Personal life ==
Sassi older brother, Mohamed Sassi is also a professional footballer is currently playing for Cypriot Second Division team, ENAD Polis Chrysochous.

== Career statistics ==
=== Club ===
As of 11 Feb 2025

Appearances and goals by club, season and competition
Club	Season	League			Cup		Continent		Total	
Club	Season	Division	Apps	Goals	Apps	Goals	Apps	Goals	Apps	Goals
US Raon-l'Étape	2013–14	Championnat de France Amateur	0	0	1	0	0	0	1	0
US Raon-l'Étape	Total		0	0	1	0	0	0	1	0
Othellos Athienou	2014–15	Cypriot First Division	18	4	0	0	0	0	18	4
Othellos Athienou	Total		18	4	0	0	0	0	18	4
Mantois 78	2015–16	Championnat de France Amateur	14	2	0	0	0	0	14	2
Mantois 78	Total		14	2	0	0	0	0	14	2
Othellos Athienou	2015–16	Cypriot First Division	12	11	0	0	0	0	12	11
Othellos Athienou	Total		12	11	0	0	0	0	12	11
AEZ Zakakiou	2016–17	Cypriot First Division	16	5	0	0	0	0	16	5
AEZ Zakakiou	Total		16	5	0	0	0	0	16	5
AEL Limassol	2016–17	Cypriot First Division	16	5	0	0	0	0	16	5
AEL Limassol	2017–18	Cypriot First Division	30	3	0	0	5	0	35	3
AEL Limassol	Total		46	8	0	0	5	0	51	8
OFI	2018–19	Super League Greece	16	4	5	0	0	0	21	4
OFI	2019–20	Super League Greece	1	0	0	0	0	0	1	0
OFI	Total		17	4	5	0	0	0	22	4
PAS Lamia 1964	2019–20	Super League Greece	10	0	2	0	0	0	12	0
PAS Lamia 1964	Total		10	0	2	0	0	0	12	0
Karmiotissa	2020–21	Cypriot First Division	31	10	1	0	0	0	32	11
Karmiotissa	Total		31	10	1	0	0	0	32	11
Doxa Katokopias	2021–22	Cypriot First Division	29	1	3	0	0	0	32	1
Doxa Katokopias	Total		29	1	3	0	0	0	32	1
Achyronas-Onisilos (loan)	2022–23	Cypriot Second Division	28	4	0	0	0	0	28	4
Achyronas-Onisilos (loan)	Total		28	4	0	0	0	0	28	4
AS Marsa	2023–24	Tunisian Ligue Professionnelle 1	2	0	0	0	0	0	2	0
AS Marsa	Total		2	0	0	0	0	0	2	0
Balestier Khalsa	2024–25	Singapore Premier League	18	13	0	0	0	0	18	13
Balestier Khalsa	Total		18	13	0	0	0	0	18	13
Career total			241	62	12	0	5	0	241	18
