= Hashem Adnan =

Kuwaiti footballer

Personal information
- Full name: Hashem Adnan
- Date of birth: June 20, 1988 (age 38)
- Place of birth: Kuwait City, Kuwait
- Height: 1.77 m (5 ft 9 1/2 in)
- Position: Midfielder

Team information
- Current team: Al-Fahaheel
- Number: 4

Youth career
- 1998–2006: Al Yarmouk

Senior career*
| Years | Team | Apps | (Gls) |
| 2006–2023 | Al Yarmouk | | |
| 2023– | Al-Fahaheel | | |
- * Club domestic league appearances and goals

Hashem Adnan (Arabic: هاشم عدنان; born June 20, 1988) is a Kuwaiti footballer who plays as midfielder for Al-Fahaheel.

== Background ==
Adnan was born in Kuwait City, Kuwait on June 20, 1988. In 1998, he joined Al-Yarmouk academy and represented all the youth teams before joining Al-Yarmouk in 2006. During his career with Al-Yarmouk, Adnan participated several competition such as the Kuwait Premier League, Kuwaiti futsal league, Kuwaiti Futsal Super Cup, Kuwaiti Division One, Kuwait Crown Prince Cup and Kuwait Emir Cup.

In August 2023, Hashem joined Al-Fahaheel.
