= Nasser Al-Wuhaib =

Kuwaiti footballer

Personal information
- Full name: Nasser Bader Al-Wuhaib
- Date of birth: 29 July 1988 (age 38)
- Place of birth: Kuwait City, Kuwait
- Height: 1.72 m (5 ft 8 in)
- Position: Defender

Team information
- Current team: Al-Shabab

Youth career
- –2007: Kazma

Senior career*
| Years | Team | Apps | (Gls) |
| 2007–2020 | Kazma | 113 | (10) |
| 2020–2022 | Al-Shabab | 8 | (0) |

International career
| 2010 | Kuwait U23 | 1 | (0) |
| 2010–2012 | Kuwait | 5 | (0) |
- * Club domestic league appearances and goals as of 17 September 2020

Nasser Bader Al-Wuhaib (Arabic: نَاصِر بَدْر الْوَهِيب; born 29 July 1988) is a Kuwaiti international footballer who plays as a defender for Kuwaiti club Al-Shabab.

Al-Wuhaib played for 13 years at Kazma. He was part of the team that advanced to the knockout rounds of the 2012 AFC Cup, scoring a goal against East Bengal in the group stage. He left the club at the end of the 2019–20 season, joining fellow Kuwait Premier League club Al-Shabab on a one-year contract.
