= Leonardo Sheldon =

Brazilian footballer

Personal information
- Full name: Leonardo Sheldon Martins
- Date of birth: 22 April 1999 (age 27)
- Place of birth: Matipó, Brazil
- Height: 1.85 m (6 ft 1 in)
- Position: Centre-back

Team information
- Current team: Sulaibikhat

Senior career*
Years	Team	Apps	(Gls)
2019–2022	Maringá Futebol Clube	5	(0)
2022–2024	Boavista	43	(0)
2022	→ America (loan)	0	(0)
2022	→ Atlético Barra (loan)	0	(0)
2023	→ Atlético Barra (loan)	0	(0)
2024	→ Remo (loan)	5	(0)
2025–2026	Al-Arabi (Saudi Arabia)	17	(0)
2026	Al-Arabi (Kuwait)	8	(0)
2026–	Sulaibikhat	0	(0)
- * Club domestic league appearances and goals as of 22 September 2026

Leonardo Sheldon Martins (born 22 April 1999) is a Brazilian professional footballer who plays as a centre-back for Kuwait Premier League club Sulaibikhat.

== Club career ==
On 22 September 2026, Sheldon joined Kuwaiti club Sulaibikhat.

Al-Arabi signed Shedlon on 28th February 2026, But did not make his debut as due to the 2026 Iran war started on the same day. later made his debut in 2025-26 Kuwait Crown Prince Cup Final winning his first trophy in his career.

== Career statistics ==
=== Club ===
As of 21 May 2026

Appearances and goals by club, season and competition
Club	Season	League			Cup		Continental		Other (Note: All appearance(s) in Kuwait Crown Prince Cup, Kuwait Super Cup)		Total	
Club	Season	Division	Apps	Goals	Apps	Goals	Apps	Goals	Apps	Goals	Apps	Goals
Al-Arabi	KPL	2025–26	8	0	0	0	0 (Note: All appearance(s) in AFC Challenge League)	0	1	0	9	0
Al-Arabi	KPL	2026–27	0	0	0	0	0 (Note: All appearance(s) in AFC Champions League Two)	0	0	0	0	0
Career total			8	0	0	0	0	0	1	0	9	0

== Honours ==
=== Al-Arabi ===
- Kuwait Crown Prince Cup: 2025-26
