= Edrissa Ceesay =

Gambian footballer (born 2001)

Personal information
- Full name: Edrissa Cessay
- Date of birth: 16 April 2001 (age 25)
- Place of birth: The Gambia
- Height: 1.90 m (6 ft 3 in)
- Position: Defender

Team information
- Current team: Al-Jazeera

Youth career
- Cayor Foot

Senior career*
Years	Team	Apps	(Gls)
2020−2021	Cayor Foot		
2021−2022	Wallidan		
2022–2024	ASC Jaraaf		
2024	Jedinstvo Ub	6	(0)
2025–	Al-Jazeera		

International career^{‡}
2021	Gambia U20	6	(0)
2024–	Gambia	3	(0)
- * Club domestic league appearances and goals as of 26 November 2024 ‡ National team caps and goals as of 26 November 2024

Edrissa Ceesay (born 16 April 2001) is a Gambian professional footballer who plays as a defender for Kuwaiti club Al-Jazeera and the Gambia national team.

== Honours ==
=== Wallidan ===
- Gambian Cup: 2022

=== ASC Jaraaf ===
- Senegal FA Cup: 2023
