= Talal Jazaʽa =

Kuwaiti footballer

Talal Jaza’a طلال جازع
Personal information
- Full name: Talal Mohammed Jazaʽa Mohammad Abdulhadi Al-Mutairi
- Date of birth: 3 March 1995 (age 31)
- Place of birth: Kuwait
- Height: 1.73 m (5 ft 8 in)
- Position: Forward

Team information
- Current team: Al-Nasr
- Number: 21

Youth career
- Kuwait SC

Senior career*
Years	Team	Apps	(Gls)
2015–2019	Kuwait SC		
2019–2020	Dhofar		
2020–2021	Al-Shahania		
2021–2024	Kuwait SC		
2024–	Al-Nasr		

International career
2013–2015	Kuwait U23		
- * Club domestic league appearances and goals

Talal Mohammed Jazaʽa Al-Mutairi (Arabic: طلال محمد جازع المطيري; born 3 March 1995) is a Kuwaiti footballer who plays as a forward.

== Personal life ==
Talal's older brother, Jaber, was also a footballer.
