= List of football clubs in Kuwait =

List of association football clubs in Kuwait

This is a list of association football clubs in Kuwait.

== A ==
- Al-Arabi

== B ==
- Burgan

== F ==
- Fahaheel

== G ==
- Go FC (not yet playing)

== I ==
- Al-Itihad (not yet playing)
- Ittihad Al-Shorta

== J ==
- Al-Jahra
- Al-Jazeera

== K ==
- Kazma
- Khaitan
- Kuwait

== N ==
- Al-Nasr

== S ==
- Al-Sahel
- Al-Salmiya
- Al-Shabab
- Al-Shamiya
- Sporty
- Sulaibikhat

== Q ==
- Qadsia

== T ==
- Al-Tadhamon

== Y ==
- Yarmouk
