= Al-Jazeera FC =

Kuwaiti sports club

Al-Jazeera FC نادي الجزيرة لكرة القدم
- Full name: Al-Jazeera Football Club
- Founded: 12 February 2025; 18 months ago, as Al-Jazeera FC
- Ground: Al-Ahmadi Stadium
- Capacity: 18,000
- Head coach: (Kuwait) Ibrahim Obaid
- League: Kuwaiti Division One
- 2025–26: Kuwaiti Division One, 4th of 8
Home colours	Away colours

Al-Jazeera Football Club (Arabic: نادي الجزيرة لكرة القدم) is a professional football club based in Kuwait, the club competes in the Kuwaiti Division One from 2025–26. It is the first sports club in Kuwait that is privately owned with no governmental control over the club while also having a single dedicated sport.

== History ==
=== Founding season ===
On 20 December 2024, during an interview with KFA President Shiekh Ahmed Al-Yousef Al-Sabah, stated new clubs are to join the Kuwait Division One with a new club yet to be established named Al-Jazeera alongside a new initiative by Ahmed Al-Yousef Al-Sabah in having new guidelines from the KFA in allowing the private sector to own their respective sports team. The following weeks' trials and signings started in Early February, alongside logo unveiling on 19 February 2025, showed the team's beige and brown colors with major signings like the head coach Ibrahim Obaid and goalkeeper Bader Al-Sanoun. After confirming their debut in both cups with their Debut Match against Al Jahra in 2024–25 Kuwait Crown Prince Cup and later against Kuwait SC in the 2024-25 Kuwait Emir Cup. The club went on to sign multiple players. On March 17, the club's debut match in a friendly vs Al-Shabab winning 1-0, a 0-0 draw against Al-Sahel, and lastly a 1-2 defeat to Al-Tadamon SC (Kuwait), all within a week. On April 2, the club announced its 23-man squad going into the cup tournaments, including multiple international stars Lasha Parunashvili, Ismaïl Sassi, and Souleymane Cissé, Saikou Janneh. Abdulaziz Al-Hadhoud was placed as Chief Executive Officer of the club. The club's official first match ended in a 1-2 defeat to Al-Jahra in 2024–25 Kuwait Crown Prince Cup, with Ismaïl Sassi scoring the club's first ever official goal in the 94th minute equalizer. Then losing 3-0 to Kuwaiti champions Kuwait SC in 2024-25 Kuwait Emir Cup with all 3 goals being own goals, with that ending the 2025 season.

==== First official match ====
2 April 2025 2024–25 Kuwait Crown Prince Cup	Al-Jazeera	1 – 2	Al-Jahra	Mishref, Kuwait
	Sassi 90+4'		Al-Shammeri 16'; Zakari 90+8'	Stadium: Abdullah Alkhalifa Alsabah Stadium

== Logo and colours ==
The original start-up crest and logo were unveiled on 19 February 2025, showing the team's beige and brown colours, which gained criticism due to their unimaginative and bland colours.

== Current board and staff ==
As of 25 July 2026

Position	Name
General Manager	Ali Al-Baghli
Assistant General Manager	Abdulaziz Al-Hajri
Team Manager	Mohammad Al-Faris
Team Administer	Hamed Abel
Physiotherapist	Mohammad Dhiya
Head Coach	Ibrahim Obaid
Assistant Coach	Mohammad Salman
Fitness Coach	Zeljko
Goalkeeping Coach	Mohammad Mirza

== Current squad ==
As of 25 July 2026

Note: Flags indicate national team as defined under FIFA eligibility rules; some limited exceptions apply. Players may hold more than one non-FIFA nationality.

No.	Pos.	Nation	Player
1	GK	KUW	Bader Al-Ajmi
37	GK	KUW	Bader Al-Sanoun
28	DF	KUW	Faisal Saeed
2	DF	KUW	Ali Hussain
5	DF	KUW	Mishal Hamad Al-Enezi
17		KUW	Obaid Muhsen
13	DF	KUW	Mohammad Al-Fadhli
26	DF	KUW	Mishal Ibrahim
3		KUW	Abdullah Sultan
12	DF	KUW	Abdulmajeed Saleem Al-Enezi
25	DF	GAM	Edrissa Ceesay
50	DF	KUW	Mohammad Salah Al-Rubaiea
15	MF	KUW	Nasser Mubarak
8	MF	KUW	Mubarak Saeed

No.	Pos.	Nation	Player
4		KUW	Omar Yousef
18		KUW	Salem Faleh
19		KUW	Said Abdullah
6	MF	KUW	Fahad Al-Fadhli
9	FW	ALG	Hedy Chaabi
11	FW	KUW	Fahad Al-Rajhi
7	FW	KUW	Talal Khaled Al-Ajmi
16	FW	KUW	Khaled Al-Awadhi
10	FW	MAR	Marouane Zila
14	FW	NGA	Isaac James Ogiri
29	FW	CIV	Yao Jean Charles Olivier
20	FW	KUW	Fahad Al-Azmi

== Managerial history ==
As of 20 August 2026

Managerial record by Name and period
Manager	From	To	Record							
Manager	From	To	G	W	D	L	GF	GA	GD	Win %
(Kuwait) Ibrahim Obaid	13 February 2025	present	25	11	5	9	44	33	+11	44.00
Career totals			25	11	5	9	44	33	+11	44.00

== See also ==
- List of football clubs in Kuwait
