= Al-Shamiya FC =

Kuwaiti football club

Al-Shamiya FC نادي الشامية لكرة القدم
- Full name: Al-Shamiya Football Club
- Founded: July 29, 2025; 12 months ago, as Al-Shamiya FC
- Ground: TBD
- Capacity: TBD
- Owner: Al-Shamiya co.
- Manager: (Kuwait) Falah Al-Sahli
- League: Kuwaiti Division One
- 2025–26: Kuwaiti Division One, 7th of 8

Al-Shamiya Football Club (Arabic: نادي الشامية لكرة القدم) is a professional Football club based in Kuwait, the club competes in the Kuwaiti Division One. It is the third sports team in the country that is privately owned with no governmental control over the club.

== History ==
=== Foundation ===
The club was founded on July 29, 2025 and was announced to be the third newly established team to join the Kuwaiti Division One alongside Al-Jazeera and Sporty for the 2025-26 Kuwaiti Division One. drawing against Sulaibikhat in the season opener as the kick off the 2025-26 Kuwaiti Division One. with Ali Wali scoring the club's first ever goal in the opening match in a 1–2 defeat.

==== First official match ====
14 September 2025 Kuwaiti Division One	Sulaibikhat	2-1	Al-Shamiya	Sulaibikhat, Kuwait
	Bruno Domingos 59'; Lucas Shallon 69'	Report	Ali Wali 51'	Stadium: Jaber Al-Mubarak Al-Hamad Stadium

== Crest and colors ==
The club themed colors are Sky blue and Navy blue. On September 4 the club launched its official social accounts revealing the club logo placing Al-Shamiya Gate face front of the logo of the area's monument.

== Current squad ==
Note: Flags indicate national team as defined under FIFA eligibility rules; some limited exceptions apply. Players may hold more than one non-FIFA nationality.

No.	Pos.	Nation	Player
1	GK	KUW	Jamal Mahmoud Jamal
2	DF	KUW	Khaled Al-Dousari
3	DF	KUW	Mishal Edilem
4	DF	KUW	Saleh Al-Banai
7	FW	KUW	Omar Al-Maimouni
8	MF	KUW	Yahya Al-Agha
9	FW	KUW	Ali Wali
10	FW	KUW	Othman Al-Failakawi
11	MF	KUW	Yousef Wali
14	FW	KUW	Ahmad Al-Shammari

No.	Pos.	Nation	Player
15	MF	KUW	Adnan Saleh
16	MF	SYR	Mishary Ahmad
17	DF	KUW	Dhari Al-Marzouq
20	MF	KUW	Mohammad Al-Kandari
21	MF	KUW	Fawaz Al-Shammari
22	GK	KUW	Abdulrahman Baron
23	DF	MAR	Abdulhakim Bassaine
27	FW	KUW	Abdulaziz Al-Sabiri
31	DF	KUW	Mohammad Al-Ali
39	GK	KUW	Abdullah Al-Fadhli
99	MF	MAR	Mohammad Al-Rohi

== Managerial history ==
Managerial record by Name and period
Manager	From	To	Record							
Manager	From	To	G	W	D	L	GF	GA	GD	Win %
(Kuwait) Falah Al-Sahli	14 September 2025	present	5	1	0	4	4	11	−7	20.00

== See also ==
- List of football clubs in Kuwait
