= Burgan SC =

Kuwaiti sports club

Burgan SC نادي برقان الرياضي
- Full name: Burgan Sports Club
- Founded: March 23, 2007; 19 years ago, as Burgan SC
- Ground: No stadium
- Capacity: N/A
- Chairman: Hamlan Al-Hamlan
- Manager: Cenk Özcan
- League: Kuwaiti Division One
- 2025–26: Kuwaiti Division One, 6th of 8
Home colours	Away colours

Burgan Sports Club (Arabic: نادي برقان الرياضي) is a professional sports club best known for its football team. Based in Al Farwaniyah, the club competes in the Kuwaiti Division One.

== History ==
=== 2014–15 inaugural season ===
Burgan SC was set to compete in pre-season matches and tournaments inside Kuwait due to it just being added to the football league and play a number of teams for Kuwait to get ready for the league. It won two unofficial silverware during Ramadan of 2014.

Their first match ended in a 5–0 loss to Al-Naser SC in their reserve league match. Their first league goal came against Al-Arabi SC in a 4–1 loss scored by Marzouq Zaki.

Their first historical victory was against Al-Jahra SC on September 7, 2014, which ended 3–2; Mohammed Kouli scored and Marzouq Zaki scored twice. Their first draw was against Kuwait SC on September 21, 2014.

After seven weeks in the reserve league, Burgan played 7 games where they lost 3, drew 1 and won 2.

As they drew with Kazma SC on November 22, 2014, they were 3rd in the league with 21 points and recorded 3 losses, 3 draws and 6 wins. After January 3, Burgan dropped to 4th, 3 points behind Qadsia SC with a game in hand.

After our signing we have to go back into winning for even if we lack a difference of 15 players from all the team since we just joined the league .

— Rashid Abdullah Al-Bous, press conference from kooora.com .

On January 25, 2015, Burgan signed their first official loan deal with Goalkeeper Yousef Al-Saraff from Al-Arabi SC with a buy out option in the summer. Rashid Abdullah Al-Bous said to the press that the team would have to re-evolve to the team at the start of the season and get back to winning form.

After finishing the league, Burgan participated in the Kuwait Federation Cup, and the 14 teams were drawn into 2 groups, and Burgan's group included Qadsia SC, Al-Yarmouk, Khaitan SC, Al Salibikhaet SC, Al-Naser SC and Al-Shabab.

Their first official cup match was against Al Salibikhaet SC which ended in a 2–1 loss, and their first official win was on May 1, 2015, against Al-Shabab 2–0. They ended their season finishing 4th in their group in the Kuwait Federation Cup.

=== 2015–2017 ===
It was decided by the management and announced on May 7, 2015, that Burgan's first pre-season tour would take place in Italy.

Burgan exited Kuwait Federation Cup with 2 wins and 4 losses on 18 September 2015. On 27 October 2015 the club management had problems with making a profit off the season's budget of the club; 40% of the management disagreed with it which cause major problems and affected the club's current form on the Federation Cup that season.

On 29 October the club played their first match in Kuwait Emir Cup vs Al-Tadamun SC, The match ended with their first win in the cup and the goal was scored by Tarik Lugman. On November 15 Fayez Frieh became the new Burganian manager.

On April 25, 2016, it was stated that the League division one would return for 2017-2018 due to Kuwait Football Association being banned by fifa thus not allowing the tournament to be returned until reinstated by FIFA.

The first win over Fahaheel was a historical win for the club as a first win and this is the true start to the season for the Burganians, even though we lost the first to games we or on the right track of success.

— Hamad Al-Harbi, press conference from kooora.com/>

On September 6, 2016, it was announced burgan would return to play in an official tournaments starting 2016-17 alongside new manager Hamad Al Harbi.

On September 28, 2016, the club played their first historical match in the Kuwaiti Premier League against Al-Nasr SC, which they lost 2–0. The following week they scored their first goal in the league in a 1–5 loss to Al-Shabab. The following week on 14 October the club got their first win against Al-Fahaheel FC 1–0.

After finishing 15th place in 2016-17 premier league the club got relegated to the lower division.

=== 2017– ===
As the 2017–18 Kuwaiti Division One ended, Burgan's first season ended in the league at 4th place who were one of the contenders to win it.

== Development ==
Before Burgan SC was registered, it had entered many friendly matches and competitions, several against KOC FC and against universities ranging from AUK to Kuwait University.

Their final match as an unregistered team was against the Kuwait Military Gov. FC and they lost 3–2.

Burgan have started to scout and build up age group teams from under-9, 12, 14, 16, 18 and under-21.

== Honours ==
=== Friendly ===
- Faraz Cup:1

2014

- Shamlan Cup:1

2014

== Crest and colors ==
=== Crest evolution ===
2007–13

2013–2016

2016–Present

Burgan SC's crest is represented as a shield of honor of Kuwait and sports, with the Kuwait map and flag and a football representing all kinds of sports.

The first idea for the logo was the same shield but without an English name on it, but they decided to add this, due to it being a new team.

Their first logo was introduced in 2007 and was replaced in 2014 after being officiated by the KFA to compete in Kuwait football. The 2014 logo has a larger sized body with a lighter color added to it with the 2007 date added to the logo.

On March 19, 2016, the club announced their new logo. They became the first Kuwaiti team to have a circular Logo.

=== Club colors ===
The club colors are light yellow and light blue, although the light yellow was previously darker.

=== Club kits ===
==== Home ====
2007-2015
2015-present

==== Away and alternates ====
2012-2016
2016-present

== Burgan managerial history ==
Years	Coach name	Nationality
2012–2014	Ahmad Nukhla	Egypt
2014–2015	Rashid Al-Bous (interim)	Kuwait
2015–2016	Fayez Frieh	Kuwait
2016–2017	Hamad Al Harbi	Kuwait
2017–2018	Alexander Dixon	England
2018–2019	Waleed Nassar	Kuwait
2019–2020	Maher Al Shammari	Kuwait
2020–2021	Bruno Šiklić	Croatia
2021–2022	Anwar Yaqoub	Kuwait
2022	Mariano Barreto	Portugal
2022	Emerson Alcântara	Brazil
2022–2023	Mohammed Al-Azab	Kuwait
2023–2024	Lakhdar Adjali	Algeria
2024–	Cenk Özcan	Turkey

== Derbies and classicos ==
=== Burgan vs Khaitan SC ===
Their first derby match happened in pre-season 2014, when Burgan beat Khaitan 1–0, and then beat them again in the league (1–0 and 2–0). The season after Burgan defeated them in the Federation Cup 8–1.

== See also ==
- List of football clubs in Kuwait
