= Talal Al-Qaisi =

Kuwaiti footballer

Personal information
- Full name: Talal Tareq Al-Qaisi
- Date of birth: 24 February 2002 (age 24)
- Place of birth: Kuwait
- Height: 1.70 m (5 ft 7 in)
- Position: Forward

Team information
- Current team: Al-Arabi
- Number: 11

Youth career
- 2015–2023: Kazma

Senior career*
Years	Team	Apps	(Gls)
2020–2026	Kazma	70	(13)
2026–	Al-Arabi	0	(0)

International career^{‡}
2021–2022	Kuwait U20	14	(3)
2021–2025	Kuwait U23	14	(3)
2026–	Kuwait	1	(0)
- * Club domestic league appearances and goals as of 14 June 2026 ‡ National team caps and goals as of 14 June 2026

Talal Al-Qaisi (born 24 February 2002) is a Kuwaiti professional footballer who plays as an attacking midfielder for Kuwait Premier League club Al-Arabi and the Kuwait national team.

== Club career ==
=== Kazma ===
Al-Qaisi rose up in the Covid Era in Kuwaiti football debuting in the 2020–21 Kuwaiti Premier League with Kazma, winning 1 trophy the 2022 Kuwait Emir Cup, became a regular starter at the end of his Kazma.

=== Al-Arabi ===
Al-Qaisi signed with Al-Arabi on July 6, 2026, on a five-year contract.

== International career ==
Originally called up in 2021 After sparking throughout the season Yousef was instantly called up to the national team for the 2026 World Cup qualifiers made his debut against South Korea

== Career statistics ==
=== Club ===
As of 21 May 2026

Appearances and goals by club, season and competition
Club	Season	League			Cup		Continental		Other (Note: All appearance(s) in Kuwait Crown Prince Cup, Kuwait Super Cup)		Total	
Club	Season	Division	Apps	Goals	Apps	Goals	Apps	Goals	Apps	Goals	Apps	Goals
Al-Arabi	2026–27	KPL	0	0	0	0	0 (Note: All appearance(s) in AFC Champions League Two)	0	0	0	0	0
Career total			0	0	0	0	0	0	0	0	0	0

=== International ===
As of match played 3 June 2026

National team	Year	Apps	Goals
Kuwait
Kuwait	2026	1	0
Total		1	0
