= Sporty FC =

Kuwaiti football club

Sporty FC نادي سبورتي لكرة القدم
- Full name: Sporty Football Club
- Founded: September 8, 2024; 23 months ago, as Sporty FC
- Ground: TBD
- Capacity: TBD
- Manager: Malik Alqallaf
- League: Kuwaiti Division One
- 2025–26: Kuwaiti Division One, 8th of 8

Sporty Football Club (Arabic: نادي سبورتي لكرة القدم) is a professional Football club based in Kuwait, the club competes in the Kuwaiti Division One. It is the first sports team in the country that is privately owned with no governmental control over the club.

== History ==
Originally Founded in 2009 as a Football Academy Sporty Sports Group ventured in 2023 in forming their own Football clubs. Originally in 2022 applied to form a football club based in Kuwait but was rejected due to not meeting the criteria's slated by Kuwait Sports Authority. Moving on in 2024 the Group operated 2 football Clubs Sporty Abu Dhabi FC competing in UAE Third Division League at the start of 2022-23 and Georgian 5th Division with Sporty Gardabani FC based in Gardabani in 2024, which both dissolved at the end of the 2024-25 season.

=== Founding season ===
On February 20, 2025, during an interview with Number 1 Football web show stated after competing in the 2024-25 Football seasons in Kuwait youth divisions and competing in UAE Third Division League and in Georgian 5th Division its time to compete in Kuwaiti Division One. Alongside 5 other new established teams including Al-Jazeera FC to compete in the 2025-26 Season. On July 28 the Club announced their official participation in all competitions main and youth divisions.

On July 31, 2025, Sporty held open tryouts with over 100 players registering within the first hour which was held in the Kazma club facilities in preparation for the Kuwaiti Division One week later the club announced former national coach Khalid Al-Turki as head coach, with Abdullah Al-Fahd appointed as his assistant. the clubs first ever friendly ended in a 2-2 draw against Al-Sahel

==== First official match ====
| 15 September 2025 Round 1 Kuwaiti Division One | Sporty | 0-2 | Al-Yarmouk | Khaitan, Kuwait |
| | | | Abdullah Al Shami 7'; Ibrahim Al-Dhafiri 90+1' | Stadium: Khaitan Stadium |

== Current squad ==
Note: Flags indicate national team as defined under FIFA eligibility rules; some limited exceptions apply. Players may hold more than one non-FIFA nationality.

| No. | Pos. | Nation | Player |
|---|---|---|---|
| 3 | DF | KUW | Abdulaziz Jamal |
| 7 | FW | KUW | Fahad Al-Azmi |
| 8 | MF | KUW | Salem Al-Khatlan |

| No. | Pos. | Nation | Player |
|---|---|---|---|
| 9 | FW | SYR | Mahmoud Zaid Oukla |
| 12 | MF | KUW | Omar Al-Enezi |
| 37 | FW | KUW | Abdulrahman Al-Enezi |

== Staff ==
As of 16 August 2025

| Position | Name |
|---|---|
| Head Coach | |
| Assistant Coach | Abdullah Al-Fahd |
| Team Administor | Turki Al-Mutari |
| Goalkeeper Coach | Fahd Al-Shashtari |
| Team Therapist | Abdulrahman Al-Khalidi |

== Managerial history ==
Managerial record by Name and period
| Manager | From | To | Record | | | | | | | |
| Manager | From | To | G | W | D | L | GF | GA | GD | Win % |
|---|---|---|---|---|---|---|---|---|---|---|
| (Kuwait) Khalid Al-Turki | 14 August 2025 | 20 October 2025 | 4 | 0 | 0 | 4 | 0 | 9 | −9 | 0.00 |
| (Kuwait) Ibrahim Shehab | 20 October 2025 | Present | 1 | 0 | 0 | 1 | 1 | 2 | −1 | 0.00 |
| Career totals | | | 0 | 0 | 0 | 0 | 0 | 0 | +0 | — |

== See also ==
- List of football clubs in Kuwait
