= Khaitan Stadium =

Multi-use stadium in Kuwait

Coordinates: 29°16′56.7″N 47°59′02.3″E

Khaitan Stadium (also called Nasser Al Osaimy Stadium) is a multi-use stadium in Kuwait. It is currently used mostly for football matches and is the home stadium of Khaitan Sporting Club. The stadium holds 11,000 people.

== See also ==
- List of football stadiums in Kuwait
