= Abdullah Alkhalifa Alsabah Stadium =

Coordinates: 29°17′29″N 48°04′08″E

- Interactive map of Abdullah Alkhalifa Alsabah Stadium
- Full name: Abdullah Alkhalifa Alsabah Stadium
- Location: Mishref, Kuwait
- Owner: Al Yarmouk
- Operator: Al Yarmouk
- Capacity: 15,000

Construction
- Groundbreaking: June 23, 2011
- Built: 2014-2017
- Opened: 2017

Tenant
- Al Yarmouk

Abdullah Alkhalifa Alsabah Stadium is a multi-use stadium in Mishref, Kuwait. It is currently used mostly for football matches and is the home stadium of Al Yarmouk. The stadium holds 15,000 spectators.
