= Al-Sahel SC (Kuwait) =

Kuwaiti football club

Al-Sahel
- Full name: Al-Sahel Sporting Club
- Founded: 1967; 59 years ago
- Ground: Abu Halifa City Stadium
- Capacity: 2,000
- Chairman: Khalid Khalifa AL - Azmi
- Manager: Mohammed Al-Azab
- League: Kuwaiti Premier League
- 2025–26: Kuwaiti Division One, 2nd of 8 (promoted)
Home colours	Away colours

Al Sahel Sporting Club (Arabic: نادي الساحل الرياضي) is a Kuwaiti professional football club based in Abu Halifa in Al Ahmadi Governorate. Sahel were the runners-up in the 1999 Kuwait Emir Cup.

== History ==
Al-Sahel Sporting Club was founded in 1967 in Abu Halifa, located in the Al Ahmadi Governorate of Kuwait. The club was initially established as a cultural and social organization before transitioning into a sports club in the early 1970s, with football becoming its main activity.

In its early years, Al-Sahel primarily competed in the lower divisions of Kuwaiti football. Following league restructures in the late 1970s, the club briefly participated in the top tier, but spent much of its history moving between the Kuwaiti Premier League and Kuwaiti Division One.

One of the club’s most notable achievements came during the 1998–99 season, when Al-Sahel reached the final of the Kuwait Emir Cup, finishing as runners-up after losing 2–1 to Al-Arabi.

The club achieved success in the second tier by winning the Kuwaiti Division One title in the 2000–01 and 2009–10 seasons, earning promotion to the Kuwaiti Premier League on both occasions.

Throughout the 2000s and 2010s, Al-Sahel continued to alternate between divisions due to relegations and promotions, reflecting its status as a competitive but mid-level club in Kuwaiti football. The team has remained active in national competitions, occasionally returning to the top division and maintaining a presence in Kuwait’s football structure.

== Rivalries ==
Al-Sahel SC’s main rivalries are with neighboring clubs such as Al-Arabi SC and Al-Yarmouk SC, often resulting in highly competitive matches in both the Kuwaiti Premier League and Division One.

== Stadium ==
Al-Sahel SC plays its home matches at Abu Halifa City Stadium, located in Abu Halifa, Kuwait. The stadium has a capacity of approximately 2,000 spectators.

== Honors ==
- Kuwaiti Division One
  - Champions (2): 2000–01, 2009–10
- Kuwait Emir Cup
  - Runners-up (1): 1998–99

== Recent seasons ==
Season	League	Position
2020–21	Kuwaiti Premier League	10th (Relegated)
2021–22	Kuwaiti Division One	2nd (Promoted)
2022–23	Kuwaiti Division One	10th (Relegated)
2023–24	Kuwaiti Division One	3rd
2024-25	Kuwaiti Division One	5th
2025-26	Kuwaiti Division One	2nd (Promoted)
2026–27	Kuwaiti Premier League	

== Current squad ==
As of the 2025–26 season.

No.	Name	Position	Nationality
Goalkeepers
1	Meshal Al Rashidi	GK	Kuwait
–	Dhari Al Masri	GK	Kuwait
Defenders
50	Meshari Al Kandari	DF	Kuwait
3	Salman Al Dhufairi	DF	Kuwait
–	Victor Lisboa	DF	Brazil
–	Abdulaziz Mahran	DF	Kuwait
6	Abdulaziz Murad	DF	Kuwait
–	Mohammad Al Rabie	DF	Kuwait
2	Ali Ford	DF	Kuwait
–	Saad Al Azmi	DF	Kuwait
Midfielders
33	Christian Alex	MF	Nigeria
72	Shaheen Alkhamees	MF	Kuwait
5	Nasser Al Qahtani	MF	Kuwait
–	Lucas Lucena	MF	Brazil
–	Aiman Al Hagri	MF	Kuwait
21	Meshari Fayad	MF	Kuwait
Forwards
29	Allan Paulista	FW	Brazil
–	Malick Cisse	FW	Senegal
–	Birahim Gaye	FW	Senegal
99	Faisal Saad Ajab Al‑Azemi	FW	Kuwait
17	Mohammed Al Aladhi	FW	Kuwait
20	Farhan Saad	FW	Kuwait
21	Abdullah Bather	FW	Kuwait

Note: Player data based on squad listings from Sofascore as of March 2026..

== Notable former players ==
Players included here have been documented playing for the club and recognized for wider impact in Kuwaiti football.

- Faisal Saad Ajab Al‑Azemi – Kuwaiti international forward who played for Al‑Sahel and elsewhere in the Kuwaiti Premier League.
- Mohammad Frieh – defender and Kuwait international, began his career with Al‑Sahel before long spells at Al Arabi and Kuwait SC.
- Franck Mbarga – Cameroonian‑German midfielder who played for Al‑Sahel in Kuwait’s top divisions.
- Ahmad Ajab – Kuwaiti forward listed in historical squad documentation for the club (WorldFootball list of players).

== Coaches ==
Years	Name
1994–95	(Socialist Federal Republic of Yugoslavia) Zoran Đorđević
1995	(Kuwait) Hussien Ali
1995–97	(Hungary) Tibor Sisa
1998–00	(Kuwait) Saleh Al Asfor
2000–01	(Kuwait) Muaed Al Ajmi
2001	(Kuwait) Ahmad Hamed
2001–03	(Bosnia and Herzegovina) Mehmed Janjoš
2003	(Kuwait) Saleh Al Asfor
2004–05	(Bosnia and Herzegovina) Mehmed Janjoš
2006–10	(Romania) Aurel Ţicleanu
2010	(Kuwait) Ali Hussain
2010–11	(Croatia) Marinko Koljanin
2011–13	(Romania) Eugen Moldovan
2015–17	(Kuwait) Abdulrahman Al-Otaibi
2017	(Kuwait) Rashed Al-Boos
2018–20	(Kuwait) Abdulrahman Al-Otaibi
2020–23	(Kuwait) Mohammed Dehiles
2023–	(Kuwait) Mohammed Al-Azab

== See also ==
- List of football clubs in Kuwait
