= Kuwaiti Division One =

- Founded: 1965; 61 years ago
- Country: Kuwait
- Number of clubs: 7
- Level on pyramid: 2
- Promotion to: Kuwait Premier League
- Domestic cup(s): Kuwait Crown Prince Cup; Kuwait Emir Cup
- Current champions: Sulaibikhat (4th title) (2025–26)
- Most championships: Fahaheel; Al-Shabab (6 titles each)
- Current: 2026–27 Kuwaiti Division One

The Kuwaiti Division One (Arabic: دوري الدرجة الأولى الكويتي) is a second-tier professional Kuwaiti football league. Winners of the league are promoted to the Kuwait Premier League. Kuwaiti Division One was introduced for the 2006–07 season, when the bottom 6 clubs in the Premier League were relegated to Division One.

On 25 April 2016 it was stated that the Division One league would return for 2017–18 due to Kuwait Football Association being banned by FIFA therefore not allowing the tournament to return until reinstatement by FIFA.

== Division One clubs 2026–27 ==
- Burgan
- Ittihad Al-Shorta
- Al-Jazeera
- Khaitan
- Al-Shamiya
- Sporty
- Yarmouk

== Future expansions ==
- Go FC
- Al-Itihad
- Kuwait National Guard
- Kuwait Fire Service
- Kuwait Army

== Previous winners ==
- 1965–66: Khaitan
- 1966–67: Al-Tadhamon
- 1967–68: Yarmouk
- 1968–69: Kazma
- 1969–70: Fahaheel
- 1970–71: Khaitan
- 1971–72: Al-Salmiya
- 1972–73: Fahaheel
- 1973–74: Khaitan
- 1974–75: Al-Shabab
- 1975–76: Fahaheel
- 1976–77: Sulaibikhat
- 1977–78: Al-Nasr
- 1978–79: Fahaheel
- 1979–84: Stopped due to all teams competing in the Premier League
- 1985–86: Al-Tadhamon
- 1986–87: Al-Nasr
- 1987–88: Al-Jahra
- 1988–89: Yarmouk
- 1989–90: Fahaheel
- 1990–91: Not held due to Gulf War
- 1991–92: Stopped due to all teams competing in the Premier League
- 1992–93: Al-Tadhamon
- 1993–94: Khaitan
- 1994–95: Stopped due to all teams competing in the Premier League
- 1995–96: Al-Sahel
- 1996–98: Stopped due to all teams competing in the Premier League
- 1999–00: Al-Arabi
- 2000–01: Al-Sahel
- 2001–02: Al-Shabab
- 2002–03: Al-Jahra
- 2003–05: Stopped due to all teams competing in the Premier League
- 2006–07: Al-Nasr
- 2007–08: Al-Shabab
- 2008–09: Sulaibikhat
- 2009–10: Al-Sahel
- 2010–11: Al-Shabab
- 2011–12: Sulaibikhat
- 2012–13: Fahaheel
- 2013–17: Stopped due to all teams competing in the Premier League
- 2017–18: Al-Shabab
- 2018–19: Yarmouk
- 2019–20: Al-Jahra
- 2020–21: Al-Tadhamon
- 2021–22: Al-Jahra
- 2022–23: Al-Shabab
- 2023–24: Yarmouk
- 2025: Al-Jahra
- 2025–26: Sulaibikhat
- 2026–27: TBD

=== Most titles ===
Club	Titles	Seasons
Al-Shabab	6	1974–75, 2001–02, 2007–08, 2010–11, 2017–18, 2022–23
Fahaheel	6	1969–70, 1972–73, 1975–76, 1978–79, 1989–90, 2012–13
Al-Jahra	5	1987–88, 2002–03, 2019–20, 2021–22, 2025
Khaitan	4	1965–66, 1970–71, 1973–74, 1993–94
Al-Tadhamon	4	1966–67, 1985–86, 1992–93, 2020–21
Yarmouk	4	1967–68, 1988–89, 2018–19, 2023–24
Sulaibikhat	4	1976–77, 2008–09, 2011–12, 2025–26
Al-Nasr	3	1977–78, 1986–87, 2006–07
Al-Sahel	3	1995–96, 2000–01, 2009–10
Al-Arabi	1	1999–00
Al-Salmiya	1	1971–72
Kazma	1	1968–69

=== Total titles won by Governorate ===
Governorate	Number of titles	Clubs
Ahmadi	15	Al-Shabab (6), Fahaheel (6), Al-Sahel (3)
Farwaniya	11	Khaitan (4), Al-Tadhamon (4), Al-Nasr (3)
Al Asimah	6	Sulaibikhat (4), Kazma (1), Al-Arabi (1)
Hawalli	5	Yarmouk (4), Al-Salmiya (1)
Jahra	5	Al-Jahra (5)

== See also ==
- Kuwait Premier League
- Kuwait Emir Cup
- Kuwait Crown Prince Cup
- Kuwait Super Cup
