= Khaitan SC =

Kuwaiti football club

Khaitan خيطان
- Full name: Khaitan Sporting Club نادي خيطان الرياضي
- Nickname: AC Khaitan
- Founded: 1965; 61 years ago
- Ground: Khaitan Stadium; Kuwait
- Capacity: 10,000
- Chairman: Abdullah Al Otaibi
- League: Kuwaiti Division One
- 2025–26: Kuwaiti Division One, 5th of 8
Home colours	Away colours

Khaitan Sporting Club (Arabic: نادي خيطان الرياضي) is a Kuwaiti professional football club named after Khaitan, a suburb of Kuwait City. Khaitan is the first Kuwaiti club to win the Division One title. Khaitan has always been among the clubs fighting off relegation on multiple occasions. The club is known for producing talent rather than buying ready-made stars.

Khaitan play their local derby match against rivals Al-Tadamon SC.

== Hounors ==
- Kuwaiti Division One: Winners 2
  1965–66, 1970–71
- Kuwait Crown Prince Cup: Runners-up 1
  2011
- Kuwait Federation Cup: 1
  1974–75

=== 2011 Crown Prince Cup ===
During the 2011, Khaitan reached the final.

Win Draw Loss

2011 First Round	Al-Nasr	1–3	Khaitan	Al Ardiya
				Attendance: 260

2011 Quarter-finals	Sulaibikhat	1–2	Khaitan	Sulaikhbat
				Attendance: 399

2011 Semifinal	Al-Arabi	1–2	Khaitan	Kuwait City
				Attendance: 5680

2011 Final	Kuwait SC	2–1	Khaitan	Kuwait City
				Attendance: 6790

== FIFA World Cup and AFC Asian Cup players ==
FIFA World Cup 1982 (Spain)

- Kuwait
  - Muayad Al-Haddad

1984 AFC Asian Cup (Singapore)

- Kuwait
  - Muayad Al-Haddad

2004 AFC Asian Cup (China)

- Oman
  - Hussain Mustahil

== Other sports ==
Khaitan maintains a sports complex hosting different sports including handball, volleyball, basketball, judo, taekwando, table tennis and athletics.

== See also ==
- List of football clubs in Kuwait
