= Al-Fahaheel SC =

Kuwaiti sports club

Al-Fahaheel
- Full name: Al-Fahaheel Sporting Club
- Nickname: Falcons (الصقور)
- Founded: April 19, 1964; 62 years ago
- Ground: Nayif Al Dabbous Stadium; Kuwait
- Capacity: 2.000
- Chairman: Hammad Al-Dabous
- Manager: Martin Ševela
- League: Kuwait Premier League
- 2025–26: Kuwait Premier League, 6th of 10
Home colours	Away colours

Al-Fahaheel Sporting Club or simply Al-Fahaheel is a Kuwaiti multi-sports club based in Kuwait City. Founded on 19 April 1964, the club competes in the Kuwait Premier League.

== Achievements ==
- Kuwait Emir Cup: 1

1986

- Kuwaiti Division One: 6

1969–70, 1972–73, 1975–76, 1978–79, 1989–90, 2012–13

- Kuwait Federation Cup: 1

1973–74

== Current squad ==
As of 2024–25

Note: Flags indicate national team as defined under FIFA eligibility rules; some limited exceptions apply. Players may hold more than one non-FIFA nationality.

No.	Pos.	Nation	Player
1	GK	KUW	Abdelrahman Al-Majdheli
2	DF	KUW	Hussein Dashti
4	DF	KUW	Hashem Adnan
5	DF	KUW	Ahmad Raheel
6	MF	KUW	Mohamed Naaem
7	FW	JOR	Ahmed Al Reyahi
8	MF	KUW	Ahmad Al Otaibi
9	FW	KUW	Ali Al-Dokhi
10	FW	BRA	Uilliam Barros
11	MF	KUW	Abdulrahman Al Harbi
12	MF	KUW	Abdullah Maewi

No.	Pos.	Nation	Player
15	MF	KUW	sheridah Al sheridah
17	MF	KUW	Salman Al Bous
20	MF	BRA	Rodrigo Yuri
35	DF	BRA	Carlos Perino
21	MF	KUW	Meshal Fawaz
26	GK	KUW	Ahmed Al Khaldi
27	MF	GHA	Robin Addo
33	FW	BRA	Vitor da Silva Vieira
45	DF	KUW	Jassim Karam

== See also ==
- List of football clubs in Kuwait
