= Sulaibikhat SC =

Kuwaiti football club

- Full name: Sulaibikhat Sporting Club
- Nickname: The Red Rockets (صواريخ الحمر)
- Founded: 1972; 54 years ago
- Ground: Sulaibikhat Stadium; Sulaibikhat, Kuwait City
- Capacity: 15,000
- Chairman: Saʿad ʿEnad
- Manager: Antonio Miranda
- League: Kuwait Premier League
- 2025–26: Kuwaiti Division One, 1st of 8 (champions)
Home colours	Away colours

Sulaibikhat Sporting Club (Arabic: نادي الصليبخات الرياضي) is a Kuwaiti professional football club based in Sulaibikhat Area, about 14 kilometres (8.7 mi) from the capital of Kuwait City.

== Players ==
=== Current squad ===
As of 24 August 2026.

No.	Pos.	Nation	Player	Date of birth (age)
1	GK	(Syria)	Abdullah Abbas	9 March 2001 (age 25)
2	DF	(Kuwait)	Saleh Khamees Al Enezi	21 June 1988 (age 38)
4	DF	(Kuwait)	Ali Al Mousawy	26 September 1993 (age 33)
5	DF	(Kuwait)	Musaed Al Enezi	25 January 1993 (age 33)
6	MF	(Kuwait)	Fahad Al Houli	12 June 1997 (age 29)
7	DF	(Kuwait)	Khaled Al Rashidi	11 January 1996 (age 30)
8	MF	(Kuwait)	Nawaf Al Shaibani	13 April 1992 (age 34)
9	FW	(Kuwait)	Abdulaziz Al Beshar	11 October 1997 (age 28)
10	FW	(Kuwait)	Abdulmohsen Al-Salili	5 January 1998 (age 28)
11	MF	(Kuwait)	Othman Al Failakawi	15 January 1999 (age 27)
13	DF	(Kuwait)	Ahmad Al Fahad	22 May 1992 (age 34)
14	MF	(Kuwait)	Yaser Dashti	21 April 1998 (age 28)
15	MF	(Kuwait)	Mohammed Hamdan	9 February 1996 (age 30)
19	FW	(Syria)	Fahad Zuwaid	28 January 1999 (age 27)
20	FW	(Brazil)	Welves	24 November 2000 (age 25)
27	FW	(Brazil)	Lucas Shallon	19 February 1998 (age 28)
22	GK	(Kuwait)	Abdulrahman Al Sharifi	20 April 1997 (age 29)
23	MF	(Kuwait)	Mobarak Saeed	19 June 1993 (age 33)
25	MF	(Kuwait)	Bandar Al Dheferi	26 December 2003 (age 22)
28	DF	(Kuwait)	Mohammed Safar	15 December 1999 (age 26)
36	GK	(Kuwait)	Abdullah Eissa	10 December 1991 (age 34)
44	DF	(Brazil)	Elielson Cardoso Bebê	11 November 2000 (age 25)
55	MF	(Brazil)	Bruno Domingues	9 September 1996 (age 30)
77	DF	(Kuwait)	Abdulaziz Al Qattan	5 November 1993 (age 32)
78	MF	(Syria)	Ahmed Daham	12 October 2005 (age 20)
93	FW	(Lebanon)	Ali Alaaeddine	6 September 1993 (age 33)
33	DF	(Brazil)	Leonardo Sheldon	22 April 1999 (age 27)
88	FW	(Kuwait)	Abdullah Al Awadhi	20 March 2003 (age 23)

== Achievements ==
- Kuwaiti Division One: 4
  - 1976–77, 2008–09, 2011–12, 2025–26

== See also ==
- List of football clubs in Kuwait

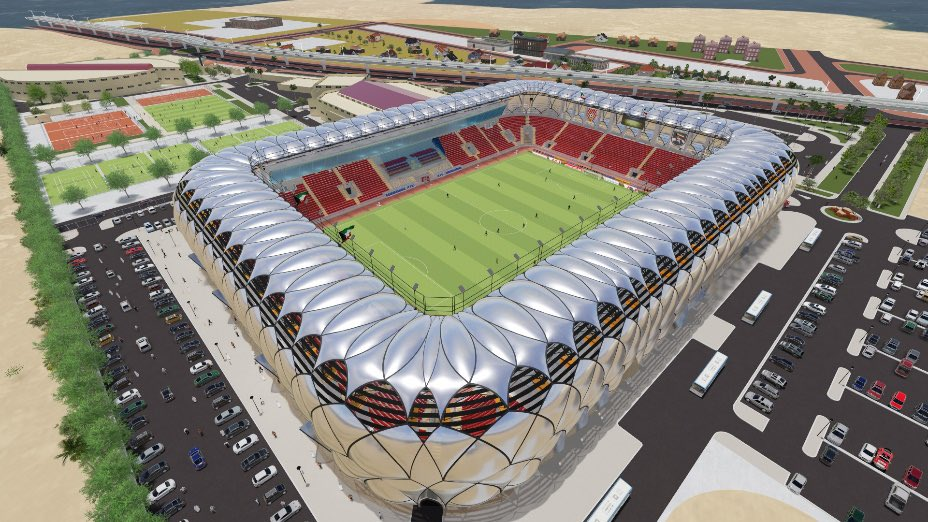
Jaber Al Mubarak Stadium, Sulaibikhat, Kuwait
