= Al-Tadamon SC (Kuwait) =

Kuwaiti football club

Al Tadhamon SC
- Founded: 1931; 95 years ago
- Ground: Farwaniya Stadium; Farwaniya
- Capacity: 14,000
- Manager: Andrea Gasbar
- League: Kuwaiti Premier League
- 2025–26: Kuwaiti Premier League, 7th of 10
Home colours	Away colours

Al Tadhamon SC (also Al Tadamon) is a Kuwaiti professional football club based in Al Farwaniya. It was founded in 1965.

== Honours ==
- Kuwaiti Division One
  - Champions (4): 1966–67, 1973–74, 1985–86, 2020–21

== Current squad ==
As of 2024–25

Note: Flags indicate national team as defined under FIFA eligibility rules; some limited exceptions apply. Players may hold more than one non-FIFA nationality.

No.	Pos.	Nation	Player
1	GK	KUW	Abdulrahman Ajaj
2	DF	KUW	Sultan Salboukh
3	DF	KUW	Waleed Saad
4	DF	KUW	Mohamed Al-Uliyan
5	MF	GBS	Bubacar Djaló
6	MF	KUW	Abdullah Al Jazzaf
7	MF	KUW	Abdulaziz Al Beshar
8	MF	KUW	Talal Al Ansari
9	FW	KUW	Fahad Al Rashidi
10	MF	KUW	Dhari Al Nazal
11	MF	KUW	Hameed Al Rashidi
13	DF	KUW	Mansour Al Enezi

No.	Pos.	Nation	Player
14	DF	KUW	Mohammed Al Qabandi
16	MF	SYR	Ahmed Al Dali
17	FW	KUW	Yousef Ayedh
19	FW	KUW	Naif Zuwaid
20	MF	KUW	Hassan Hasoun
22	DF	IRI	Aziz Nasari
23	GK	KUW	Dawoud Al Khaldi
25	GK	KUW	Ammar Bloushi
29	FW	CHA	Casimir Ninga
33	DF	SEN	Seydina Keita
77	MF	KUW	Omar Al Hubaiter
99	FW	SEN	Birahim Gaye
—	FW	KSA	Turki Al-Mutairi

== See also ==
- List of football clubs in Kuwait
