= Al Nasr SC (Kuwait) =

Association football club in Kuwait

Al-Nasr
- Full name: Al Nasr Sporting Club
- Nicknames: Al Inabii (Arabic: العنابي); Al Sougour (Arabic: الصقور)
- Founded: 1965; 61 years ago
- Ground: Ali Sabah Al-Salem Stadium
- Capacity: 11,000
- Chairman: Khalid Al-Shereeda
- Manager: Dhahir Al-Adwani
- League: Kuwaiti Premier League
- 2025–26: Kuwait Premier League, 8th of 10
Home colours	Away colours

Al Nasr Sporting Club (Arabic: نادي النصر الرياضي) is a Kuwaiti professional football club, founded on 8 June 1965, and based in Farwaniya. The team has participated in the Kuwait Premier League 26 times. Al Nasr had been promoted to the Premier League three times, as champions of Kuwaiti Division One.

== Players ==
=== Current squad ===
As of 14 January 2025

Note: Flags indicate national team as defined under FIFA eligibility rules; some limited exceptions apply. Players may hold more than one non-FIFA nationality.

No.	Pos.	Nation	Player
1	GK	KUW	Kahled Ajaji
2	DF	KUW	Abdullah Abdulaziz
9	FW	NGA	Dennis Sesugh
10	MF	KUW	Mesh'al Fawaz
11	MF	KUW	Hamoud Ayed
17	MF	KUW	Soulman Bouramya
19	DF	KUW	Khalifa Al Rajhi

No.	Pos.	Nation	Player
21	MF	KUW	Talal Jaza’a
22	GK	KUW	Khalifa Al Dhufairi
25	DF	KUW	Ahmed Al Shamri
33	MF	KUW	Khaled Al-Mutairi
44	MF	KUW	Ahmed Shalal
—	FW	JAM	Khori Bennett
—	FW	DOM	Carlos Ventura

== Managerial history ==
Years	Name	Nationality	
1995–1999	Jaroslav Gürtler	(Czech Republic)	Czech Republic
1999–2000	John Benson	(Scotland)	Scotland
2001–2002	Ali Al Shammary	(Kuwait)	Kuwait
2001–2002	Ali Al Shammary	(Kuwait)	Kuwait
2003–2004	Abdelkader Youmir	(Morocco)	Morocco
2004–2005	Slobodan Pavković	(Serbia)	Serbia
2005	Maher Al Shamary	(Kuwait)	Kuwait
2005–2006	Fouzi Ebrahim	(Kuwait)	Kuwait
2006	Mser Al Adwani	(Kuwait)	Kuwait
2007–2008	Fernando Merquiez	(Portugal)	Portugal
April 2008	Mser Al Adwani	(Kuwait)	Kuwait
2008–2009	Ali Al Shammary	(Kuwait)	Kuwait
2009–2010	Marcelo Cabo	(Brazil)	Brazil
2010	Edgar Parreira	(Brazil)	Brazil
2010–2011	Ali Al Shammary	(Kuwait)	Kuwait
2011	Abdulaziz Al-Hajri	(Kuwait)	Kuwait
2011	Valeriu Tiţa	(Romania)	Romania
2011–2012	José Rachão	(Portugal)	Portugal
2012–2014	José Garrido	(Portugal)	Portugal
2014	Rodion Gačanin	(Croatia)	Croatia
2014–2019	Dhahir Al-Adwani	(Kuwait)	Kuwait
2019–2020	Lotfy Raheem	(Tunisia)	Tunisia
2020	Lakhdar A'roush	(Algeria)	Algeria
2020–2021	Ahmad Abdulkareem	(Kuwait)	Kuwait
2021	Salman Awad	(Kuwait)	Kuwait
2021–2023	Mohammed Al-Mashaan	(Kuwait)	Kuwait
2023	Jamal Mahmoud	(Jordan)	Jordan
2023–	Dhahir Al-Adwani	(Kuwait)	Kuwait

== Honours ==
- Kuwaiti Division One
  - Winners (3): 1977–78, 1986–87, 2006–07
- Kuwaiti Federation Cup
  - Winners (1): 2021–22

== Asian record ==
- AFC Cup: 1 appearance

2011: Group Stage

Season	Competition	Round		Club	Home	Away
2011	AFC Cup	Group	(Iraq)	Duhok	0–1	0–1
		Group	(Syria)	Al Jaish	0–4	1–2
		Group	(Jordan)	Al Faisally	0–1	1–2

- GCC Champions League: 2 appearances

2012: Quarter-finals
2014: Group stage

Season	Competition	Round		Club	Home	Away
2012	GCC Champions League	Group	(Qatar)	Al-Khor	0–1	1–2
		Group	(Bahrain)	Busaiteen	2–2	3–1
		QuarterFinal	(Bahrain)	Al-Muharraq	not held	0–3(aet)
2014	GCC Champions League	Group	(Oman)	Al-Nahda Club	1–1	0–4
		Group	(Qatar)	Al Kharaitiyat	1–4	4–4

== See also ==
- List of football clubs in Kuwait
