= Al-Shabab SC (Kuwait) =

Professional Kuwaiti football club

Al-Shabab SC نادي الشباب
- Full name: Al-Shabab Sports Club نادي الشباب الرياضي
- Nickname: The Youth (الشباب)
- Founded: 1963; 63 years ago
- Ground: Al-Ahmadi Stadium; Al Ahmadi
- Capacity: 18,000
- Chairman: Craig deardoff
- Manager: Slavoljub Bubanja
- League: Kuwaiti Premier League
- 2025–26: Kuwaiti Premier League, 9th of 10
Home colours	Away colours

Al-Shabab Sports Club (Arabic: نادي الشباب الرياضي) is a Kuwaiti professional football club based in Al Ahmadi. Al-Shabab crest demonstrates behavior by picture of the hand shaking, education by the opened book, and sport third by the ball. Al-Shabab Club was founded in 1963, and competes in the Kuwait Premier League.

== Honours ==
- Kuwaiti Division One: 6
  - 1974–75, 2001–02, 2007–08, 2010–11, 2017–18, 2022–23

== Club colours ==
Blue	White

== Current squad ==
Note: Flags indicate national team as defined under FIFA eligibility rules; some limited exceptions apply. Players may hold more than one non-FIFA nationality.

No.	Pos.	Nation	Player
1	GK	KUW	Ali Fadhel
2	DF	KUW	Ali Ford
3	FW	SEN	Oussainou N'Diaye
4	DF	KUW	Mohamed Al farsi
5	DF	KUW	Hussein Al-Bahar
6	MF	KUW	Mohamed Al Attar
7	MF	KUW	Mobarak Saeed
8	MF	KUW	Ahmed Bomaryoum
10	FW	KUW	Ahmed Younes
11	MF	KUW	Ali Mustafa
12	DF	SEN	Mame Saher Thioune
14	MF	KUW	Ali Johar
15	MF	KUW	Ali Askanani

No.	Pos.	Nation	Player
16	MF	KUW	Zaid Zakaria
20	MF	KUW	Omar Buhamad
26	DF	SEN	Zakaria Diallo
29	DF	KUW	Nasser Al-Wuhaib
33	DF	NGR	James Okwuosa
35	GK	KUW	Fahad Al Enezi
37	MF	KUW	Salim Al Salim
50	GK	KUW	Saad Al Enezi
66	FW	EST	Bogdan Vaštšuk
70	FW	KUW	Saud Swayed

== Sponsors ==
- (Kuwait) Alraed Investments
- (Iran) Kalleh
- (Italy) Macron

== See also ==
- List of football clubs in Kuwait
