= Al-Yarmouk SC (Kuwait) =

Kuwaiti sports club

Al-Yarmouk
- Full name: Al-Yarmouk Sporting Club
- Nickname: Al Yaramka ( اليرامكة )
- Founded: 1965; 61 years ago
- Ground: Abdullah Alkhalifa Alsabah Satduim; Mishref, Kuwait
- Capacity: 12,000
- Chairman: Fahad Ghanim
- Manager: Goran Matkovic
- League: Kuwaiti Division One
- 2025–26: Kuwaiti Division One, 3rd of 8
| Home colours | Away colours |

Al-Yarmouk Sporting Club (Arabic: نادي اليرموك الرياضي) is a Kuwaiti professional sports club located in the district of Mishref. It was established on 28 February 1965 in Failaka Island and was the only Kuwaiti club established outside mainland Kuwait at that time. The club was relocated to Kuwait after the 1990–1991 Gulf War, which resulted in the displacement of many inhabitants belonging to Failaka's island settlements. Therefore, due to inadequate facilities after the liberation of Kuwait, it was inevitable that the team had to move to a better and more sustainable location. Other reason for the relocation was due to insufficient means of transportation to Failaka Island for away matches during the regular season.

Al Yarmouk is mostly famous for its football team, which gave rise to Kuwaiti players during the course of its history. The club has only achieved 4 trophies since it was first established, 2 of which were the Prince Cups in 1970 and 1973. The other 2 trophy achievements were the Second Division titles won in 1968 and 1989.

Al Yarmouk sports club went through a renovation project since 2006, as part of a scheme to regenerate interest within the local Mishref community. A new stadium was built, together with swimming facilities and an indoor arena for basketball, handball, volleyball, futsal and table tennis, Judo. track and field team is also widely financed from the club's department.

The club's main two colors are navy blue and white, representing the sea, which was a part of Failaka Island's culture. The logo represents ancient Greek ruins located in Failaka Island, also known as 'Ikaros' during the times of Alexander the Great.

The club is not as popular as Kuwait's big five elite (Kuwait SC, Al-Arabi SC, Qadsia SC, Kazma SC and Salmiya SC), however, it is usually supported primarily by people in the surrounding area of the club's location. Prior to the Gulf War, it was supported by the local inhabitants of Failaka Island. After relocation, it shifted away from Failaka's fanbase and is now attracting fans mostly from the Mishref residential area.

== History ==
The idea of initiating a club based in the island of Failaka began in 1963 when a group of local footballers wanted to officially join the Kuwaiti football association and start participating in its respective competitions. The club was to represent the local inhabitants of Failaka. The club was officially declared on 28 February 1965 and was formally conceived by the Kuwaiti FA board on 7 March 1965.

The name of the club roots back to the Islamic Battle of Al Yarmouk, which took place near the Yarmouk River, now the border between Jordan and Syria, between Arab-Muslims and Byzantine-Christians. The reason why this name was chosen is that Al Yarmouk holds various Greek ruins, which reminded the local people of the Byzantine Empire and how strongly it influenced Northern Arabia before Islamic times. The club badge represents a reminder of Failaka's history as Ikarus, the name given to it by the ancient Macedonians during Alexander the Great's reign over this region, and his establishments in the island which is reflected today by the appearance of many old Greek ruins.

== Honours ==
=== Football ===
- Kuwait Emir Cup: 2
  1970, 1973
- Kuwaiti Division One: 4
  1967–68, 1988–89, 2018–19, 2023–24
- Kuwait Federation Cup: 1
  2002–03
- Kuwait Joint League: 2
  1972–73, 1973–74

=== Futsal ===
- Kuwaiti futsal league: 2
  2009–10, 2010–11
- Kuwaiti Futsal Super Cup: 3
  2010, 2011, 2014

== See also ==
- List of football clubs in Kuwait
