= Al-Jahra SC =

Football club in Kuwait

Al-Jahra نادي الجهراء
- Full name: Al-Jahra Sporting Club
- Nickname: Sons of the Martyrs (أبناء الشهداء)
- Founded: 1966; 60 years ago (as Al-Shuhada); 1972; 54 years ago (as Al-Jahra)
- Ground: Al Shabab Mubarak Alaiar Stadium; Jahra, Kuwait
- Capacity: 17,000
- Chairman: Nawaf Jded
- Manager: Abdullah Al Mutairi
- League: Kuwait Premier League
- 2025–26: Kuwaiti Premier League, 10th of 10
Home colours	Away colours

Al Jahra Sporting Club (Arabic: نادي الجهراء الرياضي) is a Kuwaiti professional football club based in Jahra. They won the Kuwaiti Premier League once, in 1990. Al Jahra reached the Kuwait Emir Cup final twice in recent times, 1996 and 2002, where they lost to Al Arabi 1–2 and Kuwait Club 0–1.

Al-Jahra also offers various sports such as basketball, volleyball, boxing, and prides itself in fencing.

== Achievements ==
=== Official ===
- Kuwait Premier League
  - Champions (1): 1990
- Kuwaiti Division One
  - Champions (5): 1987–88, 2002–03, 2019–20, 2021–22, 2024-25
- Kuwait Emir Cup
  - Runners-up (3): 1996, 2002, 2013

=== Friendly ===
- Tishreen Cup
  - Winners (1): 2007

== Players ==
Note: Flags indicate national team as defined under FIFA eligibility rules; some limited exceptions apply. Players may hold more than one non-FIFA nationality.

No.	Pos.	Nation	Player
1	GK	KUW	Bader Al-Sanoun
2	DF	CMR	Aaron Mbimbe
5	DF	KUW	Adel Al Enezi
10	FW	KUW	Mohammed Al Ajmi
13	DF	KUW	Mohammed Al-Alati
14	MF	KUW	Abdel Rahman Al-Sarbal
15	DF	KUW	Ahmed Hmoud
17	FW	KUW	Mohamed Dahash
19	MF	KUW	Dahi Ibrahim

No.	Pos.	Nation	Player
—	DF	KUW	Ahmed Al Dhafiri
—	MF	KUW	Ahmed Matar
—	MF	KUW	Obaid Rafee
—	MF	KUW	Mohamed Al Ajrash
—	MF	KUW	Abdullah Ayed
—	FW	KUW	Fahad Bajea
—	FW	GHA	Izaka Aboudou
—	MF	KUW	Omar Al rougi
—	MF	KUW	Ahmed Al-Nasser
—	DF	BIH	Enes Sipović

=== AFC Asian Cup players ===
1996 AFC Asian Cup (United Arab Emirates)

- Kuwait
  - Wail Al Habashi

2000 AFC Asian Cup (Lebanon)

- Kuwait
  - Khalaf Al-Salamah

2012 Africa Cup of Nations Gabon / Equatorial Guinea

- Angola
  - André Macanga

== Managerial history ==
Years	Name	Nationality
1984–86	Antal Szentmihályi	(Hungary)
1986–87	Allan Jones	(England)
1990	Saleh Zakaria	(Kuwait)
1993–94	Jefico	(Bulgaria)
1994	Abdulqader Al Ejayan	(Kuwait)
1995–96	Volla	(Italy)
1996	Karim Salman	(Kuwait)
1997–98	Diethelm Ferner	(Germany)
1998–99	Alexandru Moldovan	(Romania)
1999	Karim Salman	(Kuwait)
2000–01	Karim Salman	(Kuwait)
2001	Jawad Maqseed	(Kuwait)
2001–03	Abdulqader Al Ejayan	(Kuwait)
2003–04	Grigore Sichitiu	(Romania)
2004	Florin Motroc	(Romania)
2006–07	Aurel Țicleanu	(Romania)
2007	Ghlafis Al Ajmi	(Kuwait)
2007–08	Alexander Klebar	(European Union)
2008–09	Marian Mihail	(Romania)
2009	Saleh Al Asfor	(Kuwait)
2009–10	Zijad Švrakić	(Bosnia and Herzegovina)
2010–201x	Ginés de Silva	(Brazil)
2015–2016	Skënder Gega	(Albania)
2016	Mohammed Al-Sheikh	(Kuwait)
2016–2017	Thamer Enad	(Kuwait)
2019–2020	Mohammed Mashaan	(Kuwait)
2020–2021	Maher Al-Shammari	(Kuwait)
2021–2023	Sandi Sejdinovski	(Slovenia)
2023	Ginés de Silva	(Brazil)
2023–	Abdullah Al Mutairi	(Kuwait)

== Asian record ==
- GCC Champions League: 4 appearances

1992: 6th position
2012: Quarterfinal
2014: Quarterfinal
2015: Quarterfinal

Season	Competition	Round		Club	Home	Away
1992	GCC Champions League	Group stage	(Bahrain)	Riffa	2–2	
		Group stage	(Qatar)	Al Rayyan	0–1	
		Group stage	(Saudi Arabia)	Al-Hilal	0–1	
		Group stage	(United Arab Emirates)	Al Shabab	0–3	
		Group stage	(Oman)	Dhofar	0–0	
2012	GCC Champions League	Group	(Oman)	Fanja SC	2–2	1–1
		Group stage	(Bahrain)	Muharraq	1–0	0–1
		Quarterfinal	(Qatar)	Al-Khor	not held	0–1
2014	GCC Champions League	Group	(Oman)	Saham Club	3–4	1–1
		Group stage	(Saudi Arabia)	Al-Raed	2–2	3–2
		Quarterfinal	(United Arab Emirates)	Al-Nasr	2–2(aet) (2–4) pso)	
2015	GCC Champions League	Group	(Bahrain)	East Riffa	1–1	4–2
		Group stage	(Saudi Arabia)	Al-Faisaly	1-2	1-0
		Quarterfinal	(Oman)	Al-Seeb	0-2	

- Arab Champions League: 1 appearance

2012: First round

Season	Competition	Round		Club	Home	Away
2012	Arab Champions League	Preliminary round	(Saudi Arabia)	Al-Fateh	1–2	0–1

=== Club sponsors ===
- (Kuwait) Al Shahed
- (Kuwait) Al Jeraiwey

== See also ==
- List of football clubs in Kuwait
