= Sulaiman Abdulghafour =

Kuwaiti footballer

Personal information
- Date of birth: February 26, 1991 (age 35)
- Place of birth: Kuwait City, Kuwait
- Height: 1.80 m (5 ft 11 in)
- Position: Goalkeeper

Team information
- Current team: Al Arabi
- Number: 22

Youth career
- Al Arabi

Senior career*
Years	Team	Apps	(Gls)
2010–	Al Arabi		

International career^{‡}
2013–	Kuwait	59	(0)
- * Club domestic league appearances and goals as of 4(UTC) ‡ National team caps and goals as of November 27, 2025

Sulaiman Abdulghafour (Arabic: سليمان عبد الغفور) is a Kuwaiti footballer who plays as a goalkeeper for Al Arabi SC and the Kuwait national team.

== Honours ==
Al Arabi SC

- Kuwait Premier League
  - Winners: 2020–21
  - Runner-up: 2014–15, 2022–23, 2023–24, 2024–25,
- Kuwait Emir Cup
  - Winners: 2019–20
  - Runner-up: 2015–16, 2017–18
- Kuwait Crown Prince Cup
  - Winners: 2011–12, 2014–15, 2021–22, 2022–23
  - Runner-up: 2012–13, 2013–14, 2019–20, 2024-25,
- Kuwait Super Cup
  - Winners: 2012, 2021,
  - Runner-up: 2020,
- Kuwait Federation cup
  - Winners: 2013–14
  - Runner-up: 2012–13, 2021-22,
- Arab Champions League / UAFA Cup / Arab Club Championship
  - Runners-up: 2012–13
- Bani Yas International Tournament
  - 3rd place: 2013–14

Individual

- Kuwaiti Premier League Golden Glove: 2024–25
