= Mohammed Ebrahim Hajeyah =

Kuwaiti footballer (born 1962)

Mohammed Hajeyah
Personal information
- Full name: Mohammed Ebrahim Hajeyah
- Date of birth: 7 February 1962 (age 64)
- Place of birth: Kuwait City, Kuwait
- Height: 1.76 m (5 ft 9 in)
- Position: Forward

Senior career*
Years	Team	Apps	(Gls)
1980–1995	Al Qadisiya		

International career
1985–1993	Kuwait		

Managerial career
- 1999–2000: Al Qadisiya
- 2002–2004: Al Qadisiya
- 2004: Kuwait
- 2005: Kuwait
- 2005–2007: Al Qadisiya
- 2008: Al-Salmiya SC
- 2008–2011: Al Qadisiya
- 2008–2009: Kuwait
- 2012–2014: Al Qadisiya
- 2014–2016: Kuwait SC
- 2017–2018: Al-Arabi SC
- 2021–2023: Al-Salmiya SC
- 2023–2024: Al Qadisiya
- 2026–: Al Qadisiya
- * Club domestic league appearances and goals

Mohammed Ebrahim Hajeyah (Arabic: مُحَمَّد إِبْرَاهِيم حَاجِيَة; born 7 January 1962) is a Kuwaiti football coach and former player. Ibrahem played for Kuwaiti football club Al Qadisiya (Qadsia Sporting Club) in the Gulf Club Champions Cup, Kuwaiti Premier League, Crown Prince Cup and the Kharafi Cup, and for the Kuwait national football team. He was head coach of the Kuwait national football team until 2009 when he stepped down and was replaced by Goran Tufegdžić.

== Honours ==
Qadsia

- Kuwait Premier League: 2002-03, 2004-2005, 2008–09, 2009–10, 2010–11, 2013–14
- Kuwait Emir Cup: 2002-03, 2006-07, 2009-10, 2012-13
- Kuwait Crown Prince Cup: 2003-04, 2004-05, 2005-06, 2008-09, 2012–13, 2013–14
- Kuwait Super Cup: 2009-10, 2013-14
- Kuwait Federation Cup: 2010-11, 2012-13
- Al-Khurafi Cup: 2002-03, 2005-06
- AGCFF Gulf Club Champions League: 2000, 2005

Kuwait SC

- Kuwait Premier League: 2014-15
- Kuwait Super Cup: 2014-15
