= Patrick Fabiano =

Brazilian footballer (born 1987)

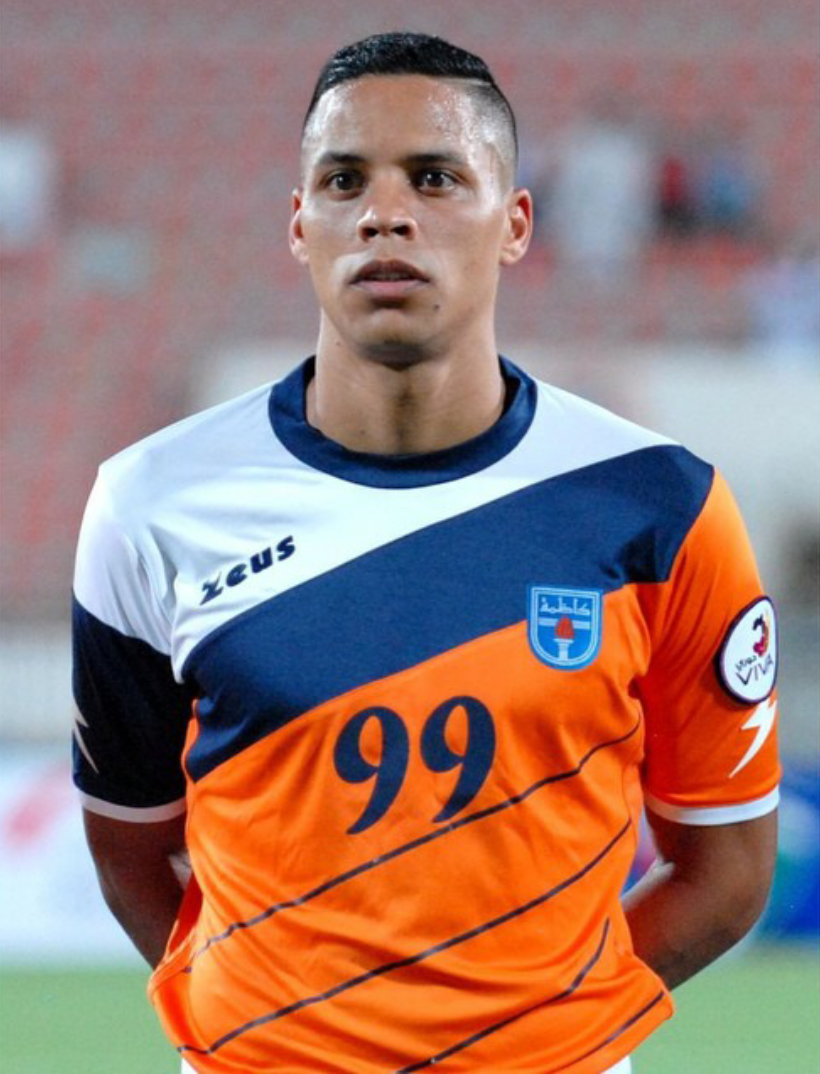
- Fabiano in Kazma in 2015

Personal information
- Full name: Patrick Fabiano Alves Nóbrega Luz
- Date of birth: 4 September 1987 (age 39)
- Place of birth: São Paulo, Brazil
- Height: 1.81 m (5 ft 11 in)
- Position: Forward

Team information
- Current team: Blumenau

Youth career
- 2004: Palestra de São Bernardo
- 2005: Guarani

Senior career*
Years	Team	Apps	(Gls)
2006	Grêmio Mauaense	11	(8)
2007	Destroyers	24	(19)
2008	Blooming	12	(3)
2009	Estudiantes Tecos Reserves	13	(2)
2009–2010	Al-Nasr	22	(18)
2010–2012	Al-Khaleej	41	(56)
2012–2013	Atlético Paranaense	4	(1)
2012–2013	→ Hatta (loan)	31	(27)
2013–2014	Al-Fujairah	31	(20)
2014–2017	Kazma	100	(77)
2017–2018	Kuwait	13	(11)
2018	→ Qatar (loan)	4	(1)
2018–2022	Al Salmiya		(53)
2019	→ CSA (loan)	5	(0)
2023	União Suzano	19	(6)
2024	Primavera	14	(4)
2024	São Caetano	9	(0)
2025	Santa Catarina	13	(2)
2025	Blumenau	7	(1)

International career
2014–2015	Timor-Leste	8	(2)
- * Club domestic league appearances and goals

Patrick Fabiano Alves Nóbrega Luz (born 4 September 1987), commonly known as Patrick Fabiano, is a Brazilian professional footballer who plays as a forward for Brazilian club São Caetano. Born in Brazil and having played for clubs in Asia since 2009, he went to represent Timor-Leste internationally in 2014 in order to be registered as an Asian player in his Asian clubs since then, despite having no connection to Timor-Leste. He was declared as ineligible to play for that national team by the Asian Football Confederation in 2017.

== Club career ==
=== Youth career ===
Patrick Fabiano began his footballing career in 2004 with the U-16 team of São Bernardo do Campo-based club, Palestra de São Bernardo. In 2005, he moved to his home town São Paulo where he signed a one-year youth contract with one of Brazil's top most club, Guarani and thus became eligible to play for the U-17 team of the club.

=== Grêmio Mauaense ===
Patrick Fabiano began his professional footballing career in 2006 with Mauá-based Grêmio Esportivo Mauaense. He scored eight goals in 11 appearances in the 2006 Copa Paulista for the Mauá-based club.

=== Destroyers ===
Patrick Fabiano first moved out of Brazil in 2007 to Bolivia where he signed a one-year contract with Liga de Fútbol Profesional Boliviano club, Club Destroyers. He scored 19 goals in 22 appearances for the Santa Cruz de la Sierra-based club in the 2007 Liga de Fútbol Profesional Boliviano. He also made two appearances in the 2007 Copa Aerosur.

=== Blooming ===
In 2008, Patrick Fabiano signed a one-year contract with another Bolivian club, Club Blooming. He made seven appearances in the 2008 Liga de Fútbol Profesional Boliviano. He also scored three goals in five appearances in the 2008 Copa Aerosur for the Santa Cruz de la Sierra-based club.

=== Tecos ===
In 2009, Patrick Fabiano again moved out of Brazil and this time to Mexico where he signed a short-term contract with Liga de Ascenso club Estudiantes Tecos. He played for the club's reserves, scoring his first goal on 26 January 2009 in a 4–1 loss against Jaguares de Chiapas He scored 2 goals in 13 appearances in the 2009–10 Liga de Nuevos Talentos.

=== Al-Nasr ===
In December 2009, Patrick Fabiano moved to Kuwait where he signed a one-year contract with Kuwaiti Premier League club, Al-Nasr SC. He scored 12 goals in 17 appearances in the 2009–10 Kuwaiti Premier League, finishing one goal behind Oman's Ismail Al-Ajmi who finished as the top scorer with 13 goals. He also scored six goals in five appearances in the 2010 Kuwait Emir Cup for the Al-Farwaniyah-based club.

=== Al-Khaleej ===
In 2010, Patrick Fabiano moved to another Middle Eastern country and this time to the United Arab Emirates where he signed a two-year contract with UAE First Division League club, Al-Khaleej Club. He made his debut for the club on 26 August 2010 in a 2010–11 Etisalat Emirates Cup qualification match in a 1–0 win over Al-Fujairah SC and scored his first goal in the same competition two days later on 30 August in a 1–1 draw against Dibba Al-Hisn Sports Club. In the qualification process, he put up an eye-catching performance for the club which included a record of five goals in a single match on 7 October 2010 in a 7–0 win over Ras Al Khaima Club and three hat tricks, on 4 September 2010 in a 6–1 win over Armed Forces, on 6 November 2010 in a 5–0 win over Al-Dhaid and on 14 November 2011 in a 6–1 win over Al-Rams Club. He also made an appearance in the 2010–11 UAE President's Cup in Round 1 on 21 September 2010 in a 4–1 loss against Baniyas F.C. He made his UAE First Division League debut and scored his first goal in the competition on 9 December 2010 in a 3–3 draw against Emirates Club. He scored 19 goals in 17 appearances in the 2010-11 UAE First Division League, finishing as the top scorer. He also scored 24 goals in 13 appearances in the qualification to the 2010–11 Etisalat Emirates Cup.

In his second consecutive season for the club, he made his first appearance and scored his first goal for the club on 30 September 2011 in a 2011–12 Etisalat Emirates Cup qualification match in a 3–3 draw against Al-Ittihad Kalba SC. He made his first appearance in the 2011-12 UAE First Division League on 24 November 2011 in a 4–0 win over Al-Urooba. In the competition, his performance of the season was on 5 December 2011 when he scored a hat trick in a 3–3 draw against Al-Fujairah SC. He also made an appearance in the 2011–12 UAE President's Cup in Round of 16 on 18 December 2011 in a 2–1 loss against Al-Sharjah SCC. He scored 8 goals in 7 appearances in the 2011-12 UAE First Division League. He also scored five goals in four appearances in qualification to the 2011–12 Etisalat Emirates Cup.

=== Paranaense ===
In 2012, Patrick Fabiano moved back to Brazil and more accurately to Curitiba where he signed a two-year contract with Campeonato Brasileiro Série B club, Clube Atlético Paranaense. He made two substitute appearances for the club in the 2012 Campeonato Brasileiro Série B, one on 19 May 2012 in a 4–1 win over Joinville Esporte Clube and another on 2 June 2012 in a 3–0 win over Grêmio Barueri Futebol. He also scored one goal in four appearances in the 2012 Copa do Brasil. The goal was scored on 13 April 2012 in a 5–1 win over Criciúma Esporte Clube. He helped his team to reach the Quarter-finals of the tournament where the club lost 4–2 on aggregate to Sociedade Esportiva Palmeiras.

=== Hatta ===
In 2012, Patrick Fabiano moved back to the United Arab Emirates where he was signed by UAE First Division League club, Hatta Club on a one-year loan deal from Clube Atlético Paranaense. He scored 25 goals in 28 appearances in the 2012–13 UAE First Division League finishing as the second top scorer. He also scored two goals in three appearances in qualification to the 2012–13 Etisalat Emirates Cup.

=== Al-Fujairah ===
In 2013, Patrick Fabiano signed a one-year contract with another Emirati club, Al-Fujairah SC. He made his debut and scored his first goal for the club on 7 September 2013 in a 2013–14 UAE President's Cup qualification match in a 7–0 win over Al-Rams Club. He made his 2013–14 UAE First Division League debut on 9 November 2013 in a 1–0 loss against Al-Ittihad Kalba SC and scored his first goal in the competition on 14 September 2013 in a 2–2 draw against Hatta Club. He scored 14 goals in 22 appearances in the 2013–14 UAE First Division League, helping his team to secure the second position in the league and thus getting promoted to the UAE Arabian Gulf League. He also scored six goals in eight appearances in qualification to the 2013–14 UAE President's Cup, sharing the top scorer award with Asamoah Gyan of Al-Ain FC and Grafite of Al-Ahli F.C.

=== Kazma ===
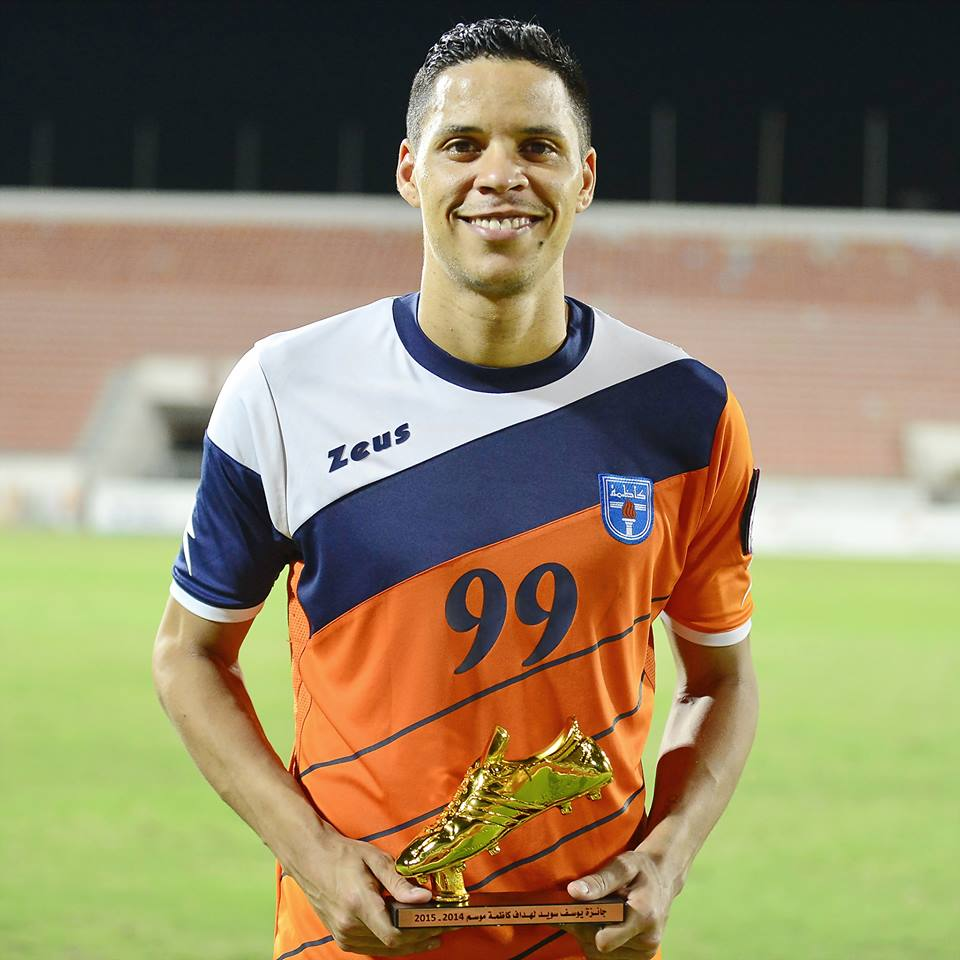
With the Golden Boot Award for 2014-15 Kuwaiti Premier League season

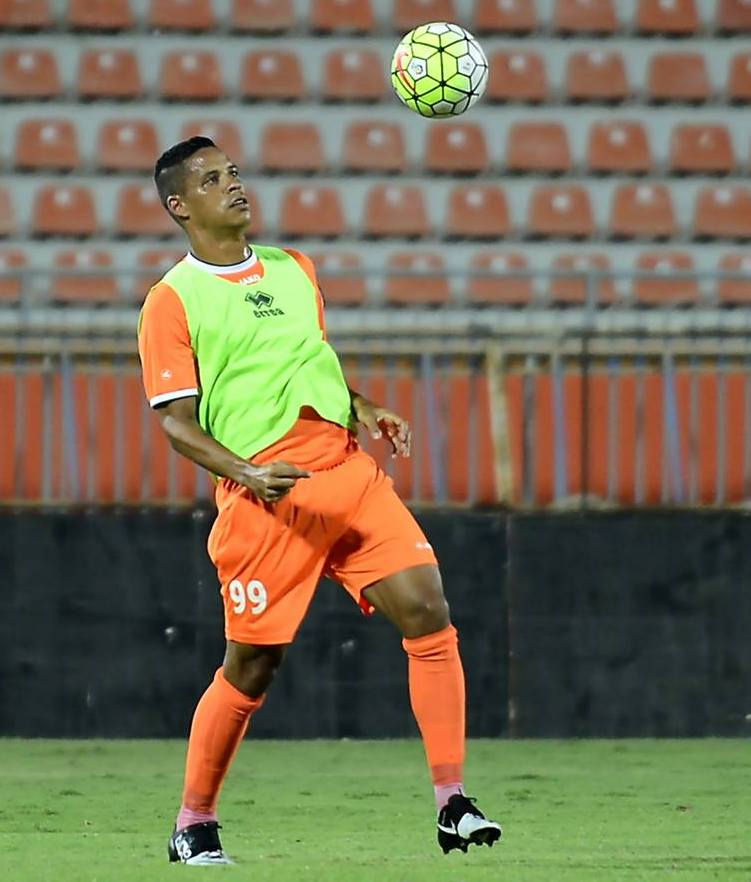
Patrick Fabiano - Kazma SC

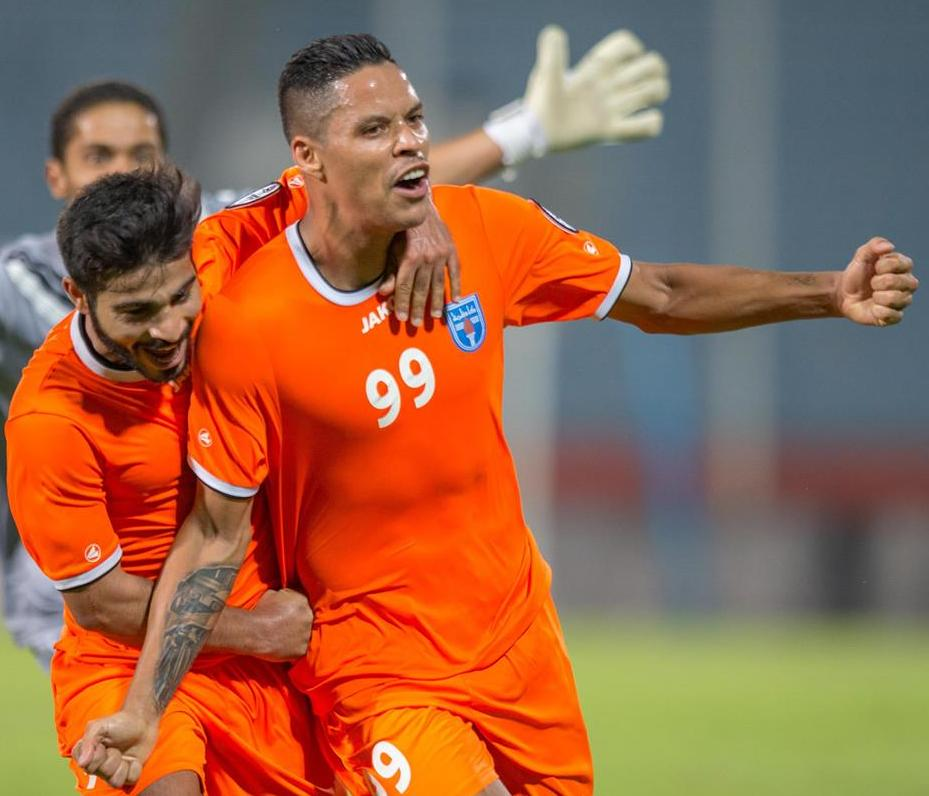
Celebrating a goal against Al-Salmiya SC

On 23 July 2014, Patrick Fabiano moved back to Kuwait where he signed a three-year contract with Kuwaiti Premier League club, Kazma SC. He made his first appearance for the club on 23 August 2014 in a 2–0 loss against Al-Arabi SC and scored his first goal in his second appearance for the club on 30 August 2014 in a 1–1 draw against 2013–14 Kuwaiti Premier League winners, Qadsia SC. On 9 December 2014, he scored the fastest goal in the history of Kuwaiti Premier League, since the league started in the 1961–62 season. He scored the first goal of the match in a 3–0 win over Al-Yarmouk SC in just seven seconds after the kick-off. He also made an appearance in the Quarter-finals of the 2014–15 Kuwait Emir Cup in a 3–2 loss against Al-Arabi SC. He made 5 appearances in the 2015 GCC Champions League and helped his team to reach the Semi-finals of the competition where his side lost to 2-1 Qatari side, Al-Rayyan SC. He scored 22 goals in 24 appearances in the 2014-15 Kuwaiti Premier League, finishing as the top scorer and also equaling the record of Kuwait's Hamad Al Harbi who also scored 22 goals in the 2005–06 Kuwaiti Premier League, one less than the record of 23 goals from Syrian international Omar Al Soma in the 2013–14 Kuwaiti Premier League.

He began the 2015–16 season in style as he helped his side win their first ever Kuwait Federation Cup, 2015–16 Kuwait Federation Cup with a brace in a 2–1 win over Kuwait SC.

=== Kuwait ===
On 27 July 2017, Patrick Fabiano signed a two-year contract with Kuwait SC. He made his official debut on 7 September 2017 in the 2017 Kuwait Super Cup and helped his side lift the coveted trophy.

=== CSA ===
On 24 December 2018, Patrick Fabiano signed a one-year loan with Centro Sportivo Alagoano, CSA.

== International career ==
Patrick Fabiano was part of the first team squad of the Timor-Leste national football team. He was selected for the national team for the first time in 2014. He made his first appearance and scored his first goal for Timor Leste in a 2014 AFF Championship qualification match on 12 October 2014 in a 4–2 win over Brunei. He made another appearance in the tournament on 14 October 2014 in a 0–0 draw against Myanmar. His second goal for the national team came on 17 March 2015 in a 1–0 win over Mongolia in a 2018 FIFA World Cup qualification match. This goal helped them secure a 5-1 aggregate win over the Mongolians and thus helping them to advance to the 2018 FIFA World Cup qualification – AFC second round. He has made appearances in the 2014 AFF Championship qualification and an appearance in the 2018 FIFA World Cup qualification (AFC).

On 19 January 2017, the Asian Football Confederation declared Patrick Fabiano and eleven other Brazilian men's footballers ineligible to represent East Timor.

== Personal life ==
On 18 June 2013, he received an East Timorese passport and hence he shares dual-citizenship between Brazil and Timor-Leste. However, the Asian Football Confederation found four years later that he had a falsified Timorese birth or baptismal certificate.

== Career statistics ==
=== Club ===
Appearances and goals by club, season and competition
Club	Season	League			Cup		Continental		Other (Note: Includes appearances in the GCC Champions League, Kuwait Crown Prince Cup, Kuwait Federation Cup, Kuwait Super Cup, Campeonato Alagoano, Copa do Nordeste, Copa Paulista)		Total	
Club	Season	Apps	Goals	Apps	Goals	Apps	Goals	Apps	Goals	Apps	Goals	
Grêmio Mauaense	2006	Campeonato Paulista Série A3	11	8	0	0	0	0	0	0	11	8
Destroyers	2007	Bolivian Primera División	27	12	2	0	0	0	0	0	29	12
Blooming	2008	Bolivian Primera División	7	1	5	3	0	0	0	0	10	4
Estudiantes Tecos Reserves	2009–10	Liga de Nuevos Talentos	13	2	0	0	0	0	0	0	13	2
Al-Nasr	2009–10	Kuwaiti Premier League	17	12	5	6	0	0	0	0	22	18
Al-Khaleej	2010–11	UAE Division 1 Group A	17	19	14	24	0	0	0	0	31	43
Al-Khaleej	2011–12	UAE Division 1 Group A	7	8	5	5	0	0	0	0	12	13
Al-Khaleej	Total		24	27	19	29	0	0	0	0	43	56
Paranaense	2012	Série B	0	0	4	1	0	0	0	0	4	1
Hatta	2012–13	UAE Division 1 Group A	28	25	3	2	0	0	0	0	31	27
Al-Fujairah	2013–14	UAE Division 1 Group A	22	14	8	6	0	0	0	0	30	20
Kazma	2014–15	Kuwaiti Premier League	24	22	1	1	0	0	5	0	30	23
Kazma	2015–16	Kuwaiti Premier League	20	22	6	3	0	0	0	0	26	25
Kazma	2016–17	Kuwaiti Premier League	20	17	8	12	0	0	0	0	28	29
Kazma	Total		64	61	15	16	0	0	5	0	84	77
Kuwait SC	2017–18	Kuwaiti Premier League	7	7	1	1	0	0	4	2	12	10
Al-Salmiya	2018–19	Kuwaiti Premier League	14	10	0	0		0		0		14
Al-Salmiya	2019–20	Kuwaiti Premier League		14		3		0		0		17
Al-Salmiya	2020–21	Kuwaiti Premier League		22		0		0		0		22
Al-Salmiya	2021–22	Kuwaiti Premier League		7		0		0		2		9
Al-Salmiya	Total			53		3		0		2	+81	58
Qatar	2017–18	Qatar Stars League	4	1	0	0	0	0	0	0	4	1
CSA	2019	Série A	5	0	1	0	0	0	18	9	24	9
União Suzano	2023	Campeonato Paulista Série A3	19	6	0	0	0	0	0	0	19	6
Primavera	2024	Campeonato Paulista Série A2	14	4	0	0	0	0	0	0	14	4
São Caetano	2024	Campeonato Paulista Série A3	0	0	0	0	0	0	9	0	9	0
Santa Catarina	2025	Campeonato Catarinense	7	1							7	1
Blumenau	2025	Catarinense Série B	13	2							13	2
Career total			359	236	63	67	0	0	36	13	478	316

=== International ===
Scores and results list East Timor's goal tally first, score column indicates score after each Patrick goal.

List of international goals scored by Patrick Fabiano
No.	Date	Venue	Opponent	Score	Result	Competition
1	12 October 2014	New Laos National Stadium, Vientiane, Laos	Brunei	4–2	4–2	2014 AFF Championship qualification
2	17 March 2015	MFF Football Centre, Ulaanbaatar, Mongolia	Mongolia	4–1	5–1	2018 FIFA World Cup qualification

== Honours ==
Kazma SC

- Kuwait Federation Cup: 2015–16

Kuwait SC

- Kuwait Super Cup: 2017

CSA

- Campeonato alagoano: 2019

Individual

- KPL Golden Boot: 2014–15, 2016–17
- Kazma SC top scorer: 2014–15, 2015–16, 2016-17
