= Firas Al-Khatib =

Syrian football manager (born 1983)

Firas Al Khatib
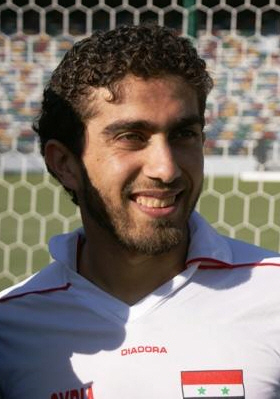
- Al-Khatib with Syria in 2010

Personal information
- Full name: Firas Mohamad Al Khatib
- Date of birth: 9 June 1983 (age 43)
- Place of birth: Homs, Syria
- Height: 1.75 m (5 ft 9 in)
- Position: Forward

Youth career
- 1994–1999: Al-Karamah

Senior career*
| Years | Team | Apps | (Gls) |
| 1999–2002 | Al-Karamah | 39 | (21) |
| 2002–2003 | Al-Naser | 21 | (13) |
| 2003–2009 | Al-Arabi | 196 | (186) |
| 2005 | → Al-Ahli (loan) | 1 | (0) |
| 2009–2011 | Al-Qadsia | 23 | (17) |
| 2011–2012 | Umm Salal | 6 | (1) |
| 2012 | Al-Qadsia | 8 | (4) |
| 2012–2013 | Zakho | 7 | (2) |
| 2013–2014 | Shanghai Shenhua | 41 | (12) |
| 2014–2016 | Al-Arabi | 59 | (51) |
| 2016–2017 | Al-Kuwait | 18 | (13) |
| 2017–2019 | Al-Salmiya | 16 | (11) |
| Total | | 435 | (331) |

International career
| 1999–2001 | Syria U17 | 23 | (17) |
| 2001–2003 | Syria U20 | 33 | (39) |
| 2003–2004 | Syria U23 | 24 | (11) |
| 2001–2019 | Syria | 72 | (36) |

Managerial career
- 2019–2020: Al-Salmiya (assistant)
- 2021: Al-Naser (assistant)
- 2022: Zakho
- 2022–2026: Al-Fahaheel
- 2026–: Al-Kuwait
- * Club domestic league appearances and goals

Firas Mohamad Al Khatib (Arabic: فراس محمد الخطيب; born 9 June 1983) is a Syrian former footballer who mainly played as a forward. He is the Syria national team all-time top goalscorer, with 36 goals.

== Club career ==
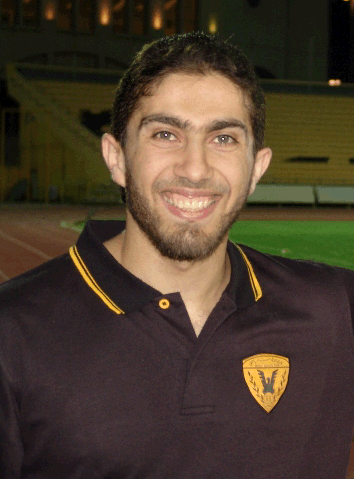
Al Khatib at Al-Qadsia.

=== Early life ===
Al-Khatib began playing football at Al-Karamah SC, he was included in the club's categories U-14, with whom he played for two seasons. One of the most important achievements of Al Khatib with youth Al Karamah was the victory of the Republic Cup and the title of the league's top scorer twice 1994–95, 1995–96. He then went on to play for Al Karamah U-17 in 1997, where he was crowned with the league title in the same year.

He also won the top scorer title. All this helped the young boy reach the youth team. During two seasons with U-19 team, he managed to win the league title and the second scorer.

=== Al Karamah ===
Al Khatib started his professional career in the Syrian Premier League with Al-Karamah in the 1999–2000 season. On 6 October 2000, he scored his first goal in the Syrian Premier League against Al-Futowa which 1–1 finished. In the 2000–01 season, he emerged as his club's top scorer, ranking joint-third overall in the league with 14 goals.

During 2001, he spent two trials in Belgium; first with Gent and the second with Anderlecht.

=== Al Naser ===
In August 2002, he transferred to Kuwaiti Club Al-Naser, and played in Kuwaiti Premier League for the first time. He then moved to Al-Arabi, which also competed in the Kuwaiti Premier League.

=== Al Arabi ===
With Al-Arabi he won the Kuwait Emir Cup three times, the Kuwait Crown Prince Cup twice and the Kuwait Super Cup once. He also scored 134 goals for the club and became a legend in the club.

In June 2005, he was loaned out to Al-Ahli in Qatar for one match, and played alongside Pep Guardiola.

=== Qadsia ===
On 24 August 2009, Al Khatib signed a two-year contract with Al-Qadsia in the Kuwaiti Premier League and played alongside his old teammate Jehad Al-Hussain.

In July 2012, he participated in three games with Nottingham Forest, scoring once in a trial of month. He impressed manager Sean O'Driscoll enough that the club were looking to sign him on a permanent basis but he was denied a work permit and the club was unable to sign him.

=== Zakho ===
On 10 September 2012, he tweeted that he signed with Iraqi Premier League club Zakho FC officially.

=== Shanghai Shenhua ===
He left Iraq to join Sergio Batista's Chinese Super League side Shanghai Shenhua at February 2013. He scored his first goal in his Chinese Super League debut.

=== Return to Al Arabi ===
He became a free agent at the end of the 2013–14 football season and returned to Kuwait. He declined an offer from Kuwait SC and joined Al-Arabi SC on a 2-year deal.

During the first derby against Al-Salmiya, Al-Khatib scored his 100th league goal, but Al-Arabi SC lost the match 3–2.

Al-Khatib ended the season with 20 goals and shared the VIVA Premier League 2014–15 top league scorer with Patrick Fabiano. His total goal tally in all competitions was 24 goals. In 2015–16, he was selected in the VIVS Premier League 1st Team alongside teammate Ali Maqseed. Al-Khatib also won the VPL Golden Boot and top scorer of Al-Arabi with 27 goals; his highest tally in any season with any team.

=== Al Salmiya ===
In September 2017, he joined to Al-Salmiya, and scored 11 goals in his Kuwaiti Premier League. He became the best goalscorer in Kuwait Premier League history after he scored 147 goals, exceeding many Kuwaiti legends.

=== Retirement ===
On 29 September 2019, Al-Khatib announced his retirement from football after spending the whole summer without a club. He finished his career scoring 349 goals (Note: 344 goals were scored in the 21st century, while 5 others were in the 20th century.) to achieve the 19th place in the list of world's best goal scorer of 21st century, as well as being the all-time top scorer of all Kuwaiti domestic competitions with 210 goals. He was also the all-time top scorer in the Kuwaiti Premier League, with 162 goals, before Bader Al-Mutawa broke his record in 2024.

== International career ==
Between 2001 and 2002, Al-Khatib played for the Syrian U-17 team. He played for Syria in the AFC U-17 Championship 2002 in the United Arab Emirates and was part of the Syrian U-23 team that participated in the AFC Olympic qualification campaign for the 2004 Summer Olympics.

Al-Khatib was a regular for the Syria national football team from 2001 to 2012. His international debut was at the FIFA World Cup qualification 2002, when he came on as a substitute for Khaled Al Zaher in the match against Philippine on 4 May 2001 in the Al-Hamadaniah Stadium in Aleppo. On 11 May 2001 he scored one goal in the FIFA World Cup qualification 2002 match against Laos the match was finished 9–0 for Syria.

From 2012 to 2017, Al-Khatib boycotted the Syrian national football team to protest president Bashar al-Assad and his government's airstrikes against Al-Khatib's hometown of Homs. On 23 March 2017, al-Khatib re-joined Syrian national football team and expressed support for Assad.

He was not included in the final squad of 2019 AFC Asian Cup after getting injured about a month before the tournament, although, he claimed that he was capable of participating if the manager called him because his injury was minor and he could be part of the second match at least. It was really disappointing to him as he mentioned many times on Bein Sports as he was one of the pundits there during the tournament. He was one of the first people who asked to sack coach Bernd Stange after the loss against Jordan. In an interview diffused 20 March 2019, he denied any rows between players about the captaincy before and during the Asian Cup, and denied also what Omar Al Somah said earlier about falling out for the captaincy armband.

On 5 September 2019, Al Khatib played against Philippine in the 2022 FIFA World Cup qualification; hence he became the first Asian and seventh footballer in total to participate in six different World Cup qualifiers, other footballers are: Gianluigi Buffon, Essam El Hadary, Pat Jennings, Russell Latapy, Víctor René Mendieta Ocampo and Dwight Yorke.

== Managerial career ==
In 2019–20, Al Khatib became an assistant coach at Al-Salmiya. In June 2021, he was appointed as the head coach of his hometown club Al Karamah. A few days later, Al-Khatib refrained for Al Karama coaching due to "family circumstances". Subsequently, he was appointed as an assistant coach at Al-Naser.

In April 2022, Firas became the coach of the Iraqi club Zakho. Three months later, in July 2022, Firas returned to Kuwait as coach of Al-Fahaheel. In May 2024, he extended his contract with the latter until 2025.

== Personal life ==
Al-Khatib, the youngest of 12 siblings, revealed that he is of Egyptian origin, from al-Sha'rawi family, in which his ancestor came to and settled in Mahin, during the Ibrahim Pasha campaign. One of his grandfathers was renamed to Al-Khatib as he worked as an imam.

He is married and has 6 children.

== Career statistics ==
=== International ===
Appearances and goals by national team and year
| National team | Year | Apps | Goals |
|---|---|---|---|
| Syria | 2001 | 2 | 1 |
| Syria | 2002 | 7 | 5 |
| Syria | 2003 | 5 | 5 |
| Syria | 2004 | 4 | 1 |
| Syria | 2006 | 7 | 5 |
| Syria | 2008 | 8 | 3 |
| Syria | 2009 | 7 | 6 |
| Syria | 2010 | 3 | 0 |
| Syria | 2011 | 5 | 1 |
| Syria | 2017 | 9 | 2 |
| Syria | 2018 | 2 | 1 |
| Syria | 2019 | 13 | 6 |
| Total | | 72 | 36 |

Scores and results list Syria's goal tally first.

List of international goals scored by Firas Al-Khatib
| No. | Date | Venue | Opponent | Score | Result | Competition |
|---|---|---|---|---|---|---|
| 1. | 11 May 2001 | Al-Hamadaniah Stadium, Aleppo, Syria | Laos | 8–0 | 9–0 | 2002 FIFA World Cup qualification |
| 2. | 9 December 2002 | Bahrain National Stadium, Riffa, Bahrain | Bahrain | 1–0 | 3–2 | Friendly |
| 3. | 9 December 2002 | Bahrain National Stadium, Riffa, Bahrain | Bahrain | 3–2 | 3–2 | Friendly |
| 4. | 17 December 2002 | Kuwait National Stadium, Kuwait City, Kuwait | Yemen | 1–0 | 3–2 | 2002 Arab Nations Cup |
| 5. | 17 December 2002 | Kuwait National Stadium, Kuwait City, Kuwait | Yemen | 3–2 | 3–2 | 2002 Arab Nations Cup |
| 6. | 21 December 2002 | Kuwait National Stadium, Kuwait City, Kuwait | Lebanon | 1–0 | 4–1 | 2002 Arab Nations Cup |
| 7. | 15 October 2003 | Abbasiyyin Stadium, Damascus, Syria | Sri Lanka | 5–0 | 5–0 | 2004 AFC Asian Cup qualification |
| 8. | 18 October 2003 | Abbasiyyin Stadium, Damascus, Syria | Sri Lanka | 1–0 | 8–0 | 2004 AFC Asian Cup qualification |
| 9. | 18 October 2003 | Abbasiyyin Stadium, Damascus, Syria | Sri Lanka | 3–0 | 8–0 | 2004 AFC Asian Cup qualification |
| 10. | 18 October 2003 | Abbasiyyin Stadium, Damascus, Syria | Sri Lanka | 4–0 | 8–0 | 2004 AFC Asian Cup qualification |
| 11. | 7 November 2003 | Abbasiyyin Stadium, Damascus, Syria | United Arab Emirates | 1–0 | 1–1 | 2004 AFC Asian Cup qualification |
| 12. | 26 March 2004 | Abbasiyyin Stadium, Damascus, Syria | Palestine | 1–0 | 1–1 | Friendly |
| 13. | 7 February 2006 | Abbasiyyin Stadium, Damascus, Syria | Palestine | 3–0 | 3–0 | Friendly |
| 14. | 22 February 2006 | Al-Hamadaniah Stadium, Aleppo, Syria | South Korea | 1–1 | 1–2 | 2007 AFC Asian Cup qualification |
| 15. | 1 March 2006 | Zhongshan Soccer Stadium, Taipei, Taiwan | Chinese Taipei | 4–0 | 4–0 | 2007 AFC Asian Cup qualification |
| 16. | 15 November 2006 | Abbasiyyin Stadium, Damascus, Syria | Chinese Taipei | 2–0 | 3–0 | 2007 AFC Asian Cup qualification |
| 17. | 15 November 2006 | Abbasiyyin Stadium, Damascus, Syria | Chinese Taipei | 3–0 | 3–0 | 2007 AFC Asian Cup qualification |
| 18. | 8 June 2008 | Thamir Stadium, Salmiya, Kuwait | Kuwait | 1–1 | 2–4 | 2010 FIFA World Cup qualification |
| 19. | 8 June 2008 | Thamir Stadium, Salmiya, Kuwait | Kuwait | 2–2 | 2–4 | 2010 FIFA World Cup qualification |
| 20. | 29 December 2008 | Bahrain National Stadium, Riffa, Bahrain | Bahrain | 1–0 | 2–2 | Friendly |
| 21. | 14 January 2009 | Aleppo International Stadium, Aleppo, Syria | China | 3–0 | 3–2 | 2011 AFC Asian Cup qualification |
| 22. | 18 January 2009 | Al-Sadaqua Walsalam Stadium, Kuwait City, Kuwait | Turkmenistan | 4–1 | 5–1 | Friendly |
| 23. | 18 January 2009 | Al-Sadaqua Walsalam Stadium, Kuwait City, Kuwait | Turkmenistan | 5–1 | 5–1 | Friendly |
| 24. | 23 January 2009 | Al-Sadaqua Walsalam Stadium, Kuwait City, Kuwait | Kuwait | 3–2 | 3–2 | Friendly |
| 25. | 28 January 2009 | Saida Municipal Stadium, Sidon, Lebanon | Lebanon | 2–0 | 2–0 | 2011 AFC Asian Cup qualification |
| 26. | 27 January 2009 | Saputo Stadium, Montreal, Canada | Haiti | 2–0 | 2–1 | Friendly |
| 27. | 13 January 2011 | Qatar SC Stadium, Doha, Qatar | Japan | 1–1 | 1–2 | 2011 AFC Asian Cup |
| 28. | 26 August 2017 | Hang Jebat Stadium, Malacca, Malaysia | Iraq | 1–0 | 1–1 | Friendly |
| 29. | 13 November 2017 | Karbala Sports City, Karbala, Iraq | Iraq | 1–0 | 1–1 | Friendly |
| 30. | 27 March 2018 | Basra Sports City, Basra, Iraq | Iraq | 1–1 | 1–1 | 2018 International Friendship Championship |
| 31. | 23 March 2019 | Basra Sports City, Basra, Iraq | Jordan | 1–0 | 1–0 | 2019 International Friendship Championship |
| 32. | 8 July 2019 | The Arena, Ahmedabad, India | North Korea | 5–2 | 5–2 | 2019 Hero Intercontinental Cup |
| 33. | 16 July 2019 | The Arena, Ahmedabad, India | India | 1–1 | 1–1 | 2019 Hero Intercontinental Cup |
| 34. | 5 August 2019 | Karbala Sports City, Karbala, Iraq | Yemen | 1–1 | 1–1 | 2019 WAFF Championship |
| 35. | 11 August 2019 | Karbala Sports City, Karbala, Iraq | Palestine | 2–3 | 3–4 | 2019 WAFF Championship |
| 36. | 5 September 2019 | Panaad Stadium, Bacolod, Philippines | Philippines | 3–1 | 5–2 | 2022 FIFA World Cup qualification |

== Honours ==
=== Club ===
Al-Arabi

- Kuwait Emir Cup: 2004–05, 2005–06, 2007–08
- Kuwait Crown Prince Cup: 2006–07, 2014–15
- Kuwait Super Cup: 2007–08

Al-Qadsia

- Kuwaiti Premier League: 2009–10, 2010–11, 2011–12
- Kuwait Emir Cup: 2009–10, 2011–12
- Kuwait Super Cup: 2009

Kuwait SC

- Kuwaiti Premier League: 2016–17
- Kuwait Crown Prince Cup: 2016–17
- Kuwait Super Cup: 2016
- Kuwait Emir Cup: 2016–17

=== International ===
Syria

- West Asian Games 2005: Runner-up
- Nehru Cup Runner-up (2): 2007, 2009

=== Individual ===
- Syria's all-time record goalscorer: (36 goals)
- Top Goalscorer Kuwaiti Premier League: 2004–05 (13 goals), 2010–11 (14 goals), 2014–15 (20 goals), 2015–16 (23 goals)
- Top Goalscorer Kuwait Emir Cup: 2004–05 (3 goals)
- Top Goalscorer Kuwait Crown Prince Cup: 2003–04 (3 goals)
- Top Goalscorer Kuwait Federation Cup: 2008–09 (8 goals)
- Top Goalscorer of the Shanghai Shenhua's squad: 2013–14 (11 goals)
- 2011 AFC Annual Awards Nominated
- VIVA Premier League 1st phase Team: 2015–16
- 2015–16 VPL Golden Boot: (23 goals)
- VIVA Premier League Player of the Month: September 2017
