= Khaled Al-Mershed =

Kuwaiti footballer (born 1999)

Personal information
- Full name: Khaled Tarek Abdullah Al-Mershed
- Date of birth: 6 April 1999 (age 27)
- Place of birth: Kuwait
- Height: 1.84 m (6 ft 0 in)
- Position: Midfielder

Team information
- Current team: Al-Arabi
- Number: 14

Youth career
- 2013-2019: Qadsia

Senior career*
Years	Team	Apps	(Gls)
2018–2021	Qadsia	10	(0)
2021–	Al-Arabi	57	(0)

International career^{‡}
2018-2019	Kuwait U-20	4	(0)
2019-2022	Kuwait U-23	5	(0)
2023–	Kuwait	3	(0)
- * Club domestic league appearances and goals as of 3 May 2025 ‡ National team caps and goals as of 6 October 2025

Khaled Al-Mershed (born 6 April 1999) is a Kuwaiti professional footballer who plays as a midfielder for Al-Arabi and Kuwait national team.

== Club career ==
=== Qadsia ===
Khaled was called up from the youth of Qadsia at the age of 19. Having only 1 appearance in the league while playing in the Federation Cup as a regular and won the tournament in 2018-19.

Soon after at the start of the 2019-20 season he won his second Super Cup. Left the team as he was released from his contract at the end of the 2020-21 season.

=== Al-Arabi ===
Al-Mershed signed for Rivals on October 2021 having instant impact that season while being a squad rotational player but his season was cut short due to injury 5 months in featuring in winning squads of 2021-22 Crown Prince Cup and Super Cup Finals.

Following season Al-Mershed became a starter alongside Sultan Al Enezi, winning another Crown Prince Cup. While in November 2023 Khaled tore his ACL ending his season early on.

In his comeback season under Nasser Al-Shatti he was one of the key players and sometimes played as Right back filling in the role for injured players. There was a minor altercation with Fabio Maresca as the referee threatened to kill him between the match as the club went to officially file a complaint in the police station and the federation. Again his season was cut in May 2024 with a broken shoulder keeping him sidelined for 6 months heading into the 2025-26 season.

== International career ==
Al-Mershed made his national team debut against Iraq in Basra in a 2-2 draw. After previously being called up in 2023.

== Career statistics ==
=== Club ===
As of 21 May 2025

Appearances and goals by club, season and competition
Club	Season	League			Cup		Continental		Other (Note: All appearance(s) in Kuwait Crown Prince Cup, Kuwait Super Cup, Kuwait Federation Cup)		Total	
Club	Season	Division	Apps	Goals	Apps	Goals	Apps	Goals	Apps	Goals	Apps	Goals
Qadsia	2018-19	KPL	2	0	0	0	—		5	0	7	0
Qadsia	2019–20	KPL	3	0	0	0	—		4	0	7	0
Qadsia	2020–21	KPL	5	0	0	0	—		2	0	7	0
Al-Arabi	2021–22	KPL	16	0	2	0	—		4	0	22	0
Al-Arabi	2022–23	KPL	18	0	1	0	0 (Note: All appearance(s) in AFC Cup)	0	3	0	22	0
Al-Arabi	2023–24	KPL	8	0	2	0	0 (Note: All appearance(s) in AFC Cup)	0	3	0	13	0
Al-Arabi	2024–25	KPL	20	0	2	0	6 (Note: All appearance(s) in AFC Challenge League)	0	3	0	31	0
Career total			72	0	7	0	6	0	24	0	109	0

=== International ===
As of match played 10 June 2025

National team	Year	Apps	Goals
Kuwait	2023	0	0
Kuwait	2024	0	0
Kuwait	2025	2	0
Kuwait	2026	1	0
Total		3	0

== Honours ==
Qadsia

- Kuwait Federation Cup: 2018-19
- Kuwait Super Cup: 2018, 2019

Al-Arabi

- Kuwait Crown Prince Cup: 2021-22, 2022-23, 2025-26
- Kuwait Super Cup: 2021
