= Khaled Al-Rashidi =

Kuwaiti footballer

Personal information
- Full name: Khaled Mohammad Aaidh Al-Rashidi (Arabic: خالد محمد عايض الرشيدي)
- Date of birth: 20 April 1987 (age 39)
- Place of birth: Kuwait
- Height: 1.85 m (6 ft 1 in)
- Position: Goalkeeper

Youth career
- 1996: Al Tadamon

Senior career*
Years	Team	Apps	(Gls)
2005–2008	Al Tadamon	45	(0)
2008–2010	Tatran Prešov	10	(0)
2010	→ Sulaibikhat SC (loan)	2	(0)
2010–2013	Al Arabi	104	(1)
2013–2014	Nottingham Forest	1	(0)
2014–2018	Al-Salmiya	88	(0)
2018–2025	Qadsia	100	(0)
2025-	Kuwait SC	10	(0)

International career^{‡}
2006–2008	Kuwait U23		
2007–	Kuwait	40	(0)
- * Club domestic league appearances and goals ‡ National team caps and goals as of 14 June 2022 (UTC)

Khaled Al-Rashidi (Arabic: خالد الرشيدي; born 20 April 1987) is a Kuwaiti goalkeeper who is currently playing for Al-Kuwait.

Al-Rashidi began his senior career with Al Tadamon in 2005, having progressed through the club's youth ranks, before switching to Tatran Prešov in 2008. Unable to break into the first team, and having only made ten league appearances, he switched to Sulaibikhat SC in 2010, but made just two league appearances before moving once more to Al Arabi that year. After 104 league appearances as the first team in 2 1/2 seasons, he won the Kuwait Crown Prince Cup and Kuwait Super Cup and had 1 goal vs Kuwait SC, he moved to England in 2013 when he joined Nottingham Forest from Kuwaiti club Al-Arabi.

== Career ==
=== Career in Kuwait ===
He scored a goal in a Kuwaiti Premier League for Al Arabi against Al Kuwait.

=== Nottingham Forest ===
In July 2012, Al-Rashidi joined Nottingham Forest on a month-long trial. Nottingham Forest put in a work permit application for Al-Rashidi along with two other Kuwait players but they were all turned down on 23 August 2012.

On 16 January 2013 it was announced by Nottingham Forest chairman Fawaz Al-Hasawi that a second work permit application had been successful and that Al-Rashidi had signed for the club. He was named as a substitute against Birmingham City on 2 February 2013.

On 15 January 2014 Al-Rashidi left Nottingham Forest.

== Personal life ==
Khalid older brother, Fahad, was another footballer and also played for Al-Tadhamon, Al-Arabi and Al-Salmiya.

== Honours ==
Al-Arabi

- Kuwait Crown Prince Cup: 2011–12
- Kuwait Super Cup: 2012

Al-Salmiya

- Kuwait Crown Prince Cup: 2015–16

Al-Kuwait

- AFC Challenge League: 2025-2026

Qadsia

- AGCFF Gulf Club Champions League runner-up : 2024-25

Individual

- 2015–16 VPL Golden Glove
- AGCFF Gulf Club Champions League Golden Glove: 2024–25
