= Ali Khalaf =

Kuwaiti footballer

Ali Matar
Personal information
- Full name: Ali Ahmed Khalaf Faraj Matar
- Date of birth: 16 January 1995 (age 31)
- Place of birth: Kuwait
- Height: 1.78 m (5 ft 10 in)
- Positions: Attacking midfielder; winger

Team information
- Current team: Al-Arabi
- Number: 17

Youth career
- Al-Arabi

Senior career*
Years	Team	Apps	(Gls)
2015–	Al-Arabi	78	(14)

International career^{‡}
2019–	Kuwait	22	(1)
- * Club domestic league appearances and goals as of 28 February 2025 ‡ National team caps and goals as of 27 December 2024

Ali Ahmed Khalaf Faraj Matar (born 16 January 1995) is a Kuwaiti professional soccer player who plays as an attacking midfielder for Al-Arabi.

Ali is the younger brother of former players Khaled Khalaf and Khalaf Khalaf and son of former international Ahmad Khalaf.

== International goals ==
Scores and results list Kuwait's goal tally first.

No.	Date	Venue	Opponent	Score	Result	Competition
1.	24 March 2023	Jaber Al-Ahmad International Stadium, Kuwait	Philippines	2–0	2–0	Friendly

== Honours ==
=== Al-Arabi ===
- Kuwaiti Premier League: 1

2020–21

- Kuwait Emir Cup: 1

2019–20

- Kuwait Crown Prince Cup: 3

2014–15, 2021–22, 2022–23

- Kuwait Super Cup: 1

2021

=== Individual ===
- Kuwaiti Premier League Player of the Round: 2024-25 (Round 1, Round 9,)
- Kuwaiti Premier League Playmaker of the Season: 2024-25,
