= Jasem Al-Mutar =

Kuwaiti footballer (born 2006)

Personal information
- Full name: Jasem Saleh Jasem Mohammed Al-Mutar
- Date of birth: 17 April 2006 (age 20)
- Place of birth: Kuwait
- Height: 1.70 m (5 ft 7 in)
- Position: Midfielder

Team information
- Current team: Qadsia
- Number: 30

Youth career
- 2018-2024: Qadsia

Senior career*
Years	Team	Apps	(Gls)
2024–	Qadsia	13	(0)

International career^{‡}
2023-	Kuwait U-20	4	(0)
2025-	Kuwait U-23	10	(1)
2025–	Kuwait	5	(0)
- * Club domestic league appearances and goals as of 3 May 2025 ‡ National team caps and goals as of 10 June 2025

Jasem Saleh Jasem Mohammed Al-Mutar(born 17 April 2006) is a Kuwaiti professional soccer player who plays as an attacking midfielder for Qadsia and Kuwait national football team.

== Club career ==
Jasem made his debut in the 2024-25 season gaining instant praise for his performance became an instant star and rotational player. scored his first goal against Qatari side Al-Arabi in the 2024-25 GCC Champions League insuring the team qualifies to the next stage, ultimately losing and featuring in the final losing to Duhok SC.

== National career ==
First called up by under Juan Antonio Pizzi for 2026 World Cup qualifiers, Jasem made his debut against Iraq.

== Personal life ==
Jasem studies at the Gulf University of Science and Technology majors in Business and plays for both football and futsal university teams in the university leagues.

== Career statistics ==
As of 29 June 2026

Appearances and goals by club, season and competition
Club	Season	League			Cup		Continental		Other (Note: All appearance(s) in Kuwait Crown Prince Cup, Kuwait Super Cup)		Total	
Club	Season	Division	Apps	Goals	Apps	Goals	Apps	Goals	Apps	Goals	Apps	Goals
Qadsia	2024–25	KPL	13	0	2	0	4 (Note: All appearance(s) in GCC Champions League)	1	4	0	23	1
Qadsia	2025-26	KPL	15	1	1	0	4 (Note: All appearance(s) in GCC Champions League)	0	4	0	25	1
Qadsia	Career total		28	1	3	0	8	1	8	0	47	2

=== International ===
As of match played 10 June 2025

National team	Year	Apps	Goals
Kuwait	2025	4	0
Kuwait	2026	1	0
Total		5	0

== Honours ==
=== Qadsia ===
- Kuwait Super Cup: 2025-26

=== Individual ===
- Kuwaiti Premier League POTW: 2024-25 W18
- Kuwaiti Premier League Young Player of the season: 2024-25
