= Mohammad Daham =

Kuwaiti footballer

Personal information
- Full name: Mohammad Daham Khader Abdullah
- Date of birth: 17 February 2000 (age 26)
- Place of birth: Kuwait
- Height: 1.77 m (5 ft 10 in)
- Position: Winger

Team information
- Current team: Kuwait SC
- Number: 11

Senior career*
Years	Team	Apps	(Gls)
2019–2023	Al-Nasr		(26)
2023–	Kuwait SC		(14)

International career^{‡}
2023–	Kuwait	30	(12)
- * Club domestic league appearances and goals ‡ National team caps and goals as of 25 November 2025

Mohammad Daham Khader Abdullah Al-Enezi (Arabic: مُحَمَّد دَحَّام خَضِر عَبْد الله الْعنِزِي; born 17 February 2000) is a Kuwaiti professional footballer who plays as a winger for Kuwait SC and the Kuwait national team.

== Club career ==
With Al-Nasr, Daham won the 2022–23 Kuwaiti Premier League best player award with 18 goals scored. In June 2023, Daham was transferred to Kuwait SC for a reported transfer fee of 200,000 KWD.

== International career ==
Despite being born in Kuwait, Daham was a stateless person since his birth. In 2023, he received a Kuwaiti passport to make him eligible to represent the Kuwait national team after promising performance with Al-Nasr. He was named in Kuwait's squad for the 2023 SAFF Championship.

In the 2026 World Cup qualifiers, Daham scored the equalizing goal to help Kuwait draw with Jordan 1–1 on 19 November 2024.

== Career statistics ==
As of match played on 15 January 2025

Appearances and goals by club, season and competition
Club	Season	League			Cup		Continental		Other		Total	
Club	Season	Division	Apps	Goals	Apps	Goals	Apps	Goals	Apps	Goals	Apps	Goals
Kuwait	2023–24	KPL		13			5 (Note: Appearances in AFC Cup)	0	3	0		13
Kuwait	2024–25	KPL	8	1	0	0	6	0	0	0	14	1
Kuwait	Total			14			11	0				14

=== International ===
As of match played 25 November 2025

Appearances and goals by national team and year
National team	Year	Apps	Goals
Kuwait	2023	10	2
Kuwait	2024	14	5
Kuwait	2025	6	5
Total		30	12

List of international goals scored by Mohammad Daham
No.	Date	Venue	Opponent	Score	Result	Competition
1.	21 June 2023	Sree Kanteerava Stadium, Bangalore, India	Nepal	3–0	3–1	2023 SAFF Championship
2.	21 November 2023	Al-Ettifaq Club Stadium, Khobar, Saudi Arabia	Afghanistan	2–0	4–0	2026 FIFA World Cup qualification
3.	26 March 2024	Ali Sabah Al-Salem Stadium, Farwaniya, Kuwait	Qatar	1–1	1–2	2026 FIFA World Cup qualification
4.	14 November 2024	Jaber Al-Ahmad International Stadium, Kuwait City, Kuwait	South Korea	1–2	1–3	2026 FIFA World Cup qualification
5.	19 November 2024	Jaber Al-Ahmad International Stadium, Kuwait City, Kuwait	Jordan	1–1	1–1	2026 FIFA World Cup qualification
6.	24 December 2024	Jaber Al-Ahmad International Stadium, Kuwait City, Kuwait	United Arab Emirates	1–1	2–1	26th Arabian Gulf Cup
7.	27 December 2024	Jaber Al-Ahmad International Stadium, Kuwait City, Kuwait	Qatar	1–0	1–1	26th Arabian Gulf Cup
8.	8 September 2025	Jassim bin Hamad Stadium, Doha, Qatar	Syria	2–1	2–2	Friendly
9.	15 November 2025	Al Salam Stadium, Cairo, Egypt	Tanzania	1–2	4–3	Friendly
10.	15 November 2025	Al Salam Stadium, Cairo, Egypt	Tanzania	2–2	4–3	Friendly
11.	25 November 2025	Jassim bin Hamad Stadium, Doha, Qatar	Mauritania	1–0	2–0	2025 FIFA Arab Cup qualification
12.	25 November 2025	Jassim bin Hamad Stadium, Doha, Qatar	Mauritania	2–0	2–0	2025 FIFA Arab Cup qualification

== Honours ==
Al-Nasr

- Kuwait Federation Cup: 2021-22

Kuwait SC

- Kuwaiti Premier League: 2023–24, 2024–25
- Kuwait Emir Cup: 2024-25
- Kuwait Crown Prince Cup: 2024-25
- Kuwait Super Cup: 2023–24, 2024–25
- AFC Challenge League: 2025-2026

Individual

- Kuwaiti Premier League Player of the Season: 2023–24, 2024–25
