= Hussain Kankouni =

Kuwaiti footballer (born 2005)

Personal information
- Full name: Hussain Shehab Kankouni
- Date of birth: 30 May 2005 (age 21)
- Place of birth: Kuwait
- Height: 1.90 m (6 ft 3 in)
- Position: Goalkeeper

Team information
- Current team: Al-Arabi
- Number: 1

Youth career
- 2015–2023: Al-Arabi

Senior career*
Years	Team	Apps	(Gls)
2023–	Al-Arabi	0	(0)
2024–2026	→ Kazma (loan)	2	(0)

International career^{‡}
2023–2025	Kuwait U20	15	(0)
2024–	Kuwait U23	8	(0)
- * Club domestic league appearances and goals as of 14 June 2026 ‡ National team caps and goals as of 14 June 2026

Hussain Shehab Kankouni (born 30 May 2005) is a Kuwaiti professional footballer who plays as a goalkeeper for Kuwait Premier League club Al-Arabi and the Kuwait national team. He is the son of former Goalkeeper Shehab Kankouni.

== Club career ==
=== Al-Arabi ===
Climbing through the youth sector of Al-Arabi in 2023 signed a five-year contract with the team but failed to play any matches.

=== Kazma loan spell ===
in August 2024 he signed a two-year loan spell to Kazma as back up keeper to his uncle also named Hussain Kankoni. making just two appearances within two seasons.

=== Return to Al-Arabi ===
After the loan spell Kankouni was selected for training camp ahead of 2026-27 AFC Champions League Two Qualifiers signed with Ashkanani Sport as his new agents.

== National career ==
Although previously called up forfor the Kuwait Olympic National team, On 31 May 2026, he was selected for the initial roster for participating in the 2026 Asian Games.

== Career statistics ==
=== Club ===
As of 21 May 2026

Appearances and goals by club, season and competition
Club	Season	League			Cup		Continental		Other (Note: All appearance(s) in Kuwait Crown Prince Cup, Kuwait Super Cup)		Total	
Club	Season	Division	Apps	Goals	Apps	Goals	Apps	Goals	Apps	Goals	Apps	Goals
Al-Arabi	2023–24	KPL	0	0	0	0	0 (Note: All appearance(s) in AFC Cup)	0	0	0	0	0
Kazma	2024–25	KPL	1	0	0	0	0	0	0	0	1	0
Kazma	2025–26	KPL	1	0	0	0	0	0	0	0	1	0
Career total			2	0	0	0	0	0	0	0	2	0

== Honors and achievements ==
=== Individual ===
KPL Best young Goalkeeper: 2024–25
