= Ittihad Al-Shorta SC =

Kuwaiti football club

Ittihad Al-Shorta SC نادي اتحاد الشرطة الرياضي
- Full name: Ittihad Al-Shorta Sporting Club
- Founded: August 16, 2026; 54 days ago, as Ittihad Al-Shorta SC
- Ground: TBD
- Capacity: TBD
- Owner: Kuwait MOI
- Manager: (Kuwait) Mohammed Abass
- League: Kuwaiti Division One
- 2026–27: inaugural season

Ittihad Al-Shorta Sporting Club (Arabic: نادي اتحاد الشرطة الرياضي) is a professional Football club based in Kuwait, the club competes in the Kuwaiti Division One. It is the first sports team in the country that is owned and controlled by a governmental ministry the Kuwait Ministry of Interior.

== History ==
=== Foundation ===
The Ministry formerly competed in the Ministries league under the Ministry's name fielding professional players who worked in different sectors across the Ministry such as Khaled Al-Mershed, Ali Khalaf, Fawaz Ayedh and many more.

On August 16, 2026 Kuwait Ministry of Interior announced over all their social media sports accounts that they have formed a club named Ittihad Al-Shorta Sporting Club and announcing its participation under Kuwait Football Association competitions starting in the 2026-2027 season within Kuwaiti Division One. winning the club’s inaugural match against Burgan SC 1-0 by a Salem Al-Houli penalty.

== Crest and colors ==
The club themed colors are Navy blue, using the original logo used prior of the formation of the club.

== Current squad ==
As of 25 August 2026

Note: Flags indicate national team as defined under FIFA eligibility rules; some limited exceptions apply. Players may hold more than one non-FIFA nationality.

No.	Pos.	Nation	Player
—	GK	KUW	Nawaf Al-Shammari

== Managerial history ==
Managerial record by Name and period
Manager	From	To	Record							
Manager	From	To	G	W	D	L	GF	GA	GD	Win %
(Kuwait) Mohammed Abass	16 August 2026	present	0	0	0	0	0	0	+0	—

== See also ==
- List of football clubs in Kuwait
