= Khaled Khalaf =

Kuwaiti footballer (born 1983)

Personal information
- Date of birth: August 15, 1983 (age 43)
- Place of birth: Kuwait City, Kuwait
- Height: 1.80 m (5 ft 11 in)
- Positions: Striker; winger

Team information
- Current team: Al Arabi

Senior career*
Years	Team	Apps	(Gls)
2003–2016	Al Arabi	?	(66)
Total		?	(66)

International career^{‡}
2005–2011	Kuwait	30	(5)
- * Club domestic league appearances and goals as of 8:51, June 3, 2013 (UTC) ‡ National team caps and goals as of January 22, 2011

Khaled Ahmad Khalaf Matar (Arabic: خَالِد أَحْمَد خَلَف مَطَر; born August 15, 1983, in Kuwait City) is a Kuwaiti footballer who plays in Attack for Kuwaiti Premier League club Al Arabi and the Kuwait national football team with his brothers in Al-Arabi Khalaf Ahmed Khalaf and Ali Khalaf.

He played for Al-Arabi in the 2007 AFC Champions League group stage.

He is away from football for 2 1/2 seasons due to injury in his leg and has returned to football in Al-Arabi Sporting Club in season 2014–15.

== Youth career ==
Khalid started his youth career in Al-Arabi SC which he scored many goals for the team and moved on to the 1st team with Ali Maqseed and many other player from the youth team.

== Career ==
After he joined the first team he was a fantastic sub for the coach where he used to substitute him when the team is down or tied he would score with Firas Al-Khatib.

=== (2006-07) ===
But Khaled truly made his dominance in Kuwaiti Football in the 2006–2007 season when he scored 2 goals against Qadsia SC. through that season, by scoring in the Final against Kazma Sporting Clubin the Kuwait Crown Prince Cup and Crowning them champions for the 5th time and his first.

=== 2007-08 ===
In 2007-08 Khaled scored 14 goals that season through the league and 3 domestic cups but won the Kuwait Emir Cup At the end of the season.

=== 2008-09 ===
In 2008-09 Khaled scored 7 goals all season which he was one of the starting players in the team and Kuwait national football team he won the Kuwait Super Cup at the start of the season and scored 2 goals in the Classico through that Al-Arabi SC have struggled in the league by going down to 5th position and going out from Kuwait Crown Prince Cup by losing to Al-Jahra SC 3–2 but made it to the Kuwait Emir Cup Final but lost 2–1.

=== 2009-10 ===
After Firas Al-Khatib left the club to join their rivals Qadsia SC Al-Arabi SC had a struggle through the year as finishing 6th in the league and as runner up to the Crown Cup while Khaled scored 7 goals that season.

=== 2010-11 ===
Khaled played half the season until the Waff Cup with the international team he got injured in his knee where he couldn't play the whole season

=== 2011-14 ===
After his recovery he came back and won The Kuwait Crown Prince Cup but after that his knee got injured again and was spelled out for 2 1/2 seasons from the club but all championship the club won was added to his career since he was part of the team.

=== 2014-15 ===
His Cup return was vs Kazma SC in Kuwait Federation Cup group-stage match 1–1.

== International goals ==
#	Date	Venue	Opponent	Score	Result	Competition
1	December 20, 2008	Kuwait	Egypt	2-1	Win	Friendly
2	January 10, 2009	Oman	Iraq	1-1	Draw	Arabian Gulf Cup
3	January 20, 2009	Kuwait	Turkmenistan	2-0	Win	Friendly
4	September 3, 2010	Kuwait	Syria	3-0	Win	Friendly
5	November 14, 2010	Abu Dhabi	India	9-1	Win	Friendly

== Honors ==
Al Arabi

- VIVA Premier League: 2001–02
- Kuwait Emir Cup: 2004–05, 2005–06, 2007–08
- Kuwait Crown Prince Cup: 2006–07, 2011–12, 2014–15
- Kuwait Super Cup: 2008, 2012
- Kuwait Federation Cup: 2013–14

Kuwait

- Arabian Gulf Cup: 2010
- West Asian Football Federation Championship: 2010

Individual

- Kuwait Super Cup top scorer: 2008
