= 2015–16 Kuwaiti Premier League =

Kuwaiti Premier League
- Season: 2015–16
- Champions: Qadsia (17th title)
- Relegated: Al Tadhamon; Al-Nasr; Al-Yarmouk
- AFC Champions League: Qadsia; Kuwait
- GCC Champions League: Al-Salmiya; Kazma
- Matches: 156
- Goals: 482 (3.09 per match)
- Top goalscorer: Firas Al-Khatib 23 goals
- Highest attendance: Al-Arabi SC vs Qadsia SC (12-2-2016 22,897)
- Lowest attendance: Sahel SC vs Fahaheel (football club) (17-10-2015 6 people)

Kuwait SC enter the season as defending champions.

This season there will be three relegated teams with Al Tadhamon for the return of Kuwaiti Division One tournament with Burgan SC.

== Teams ==
- Al Arabi
- Al Fahaheel
- Al Jahra
- Al Kuwait
- Al Nasar
- Al Qadsia
- Al Sahel
- Al Sulaibikhat
- Al Salmiyah
- Al Shabab
- Al Tadhamon*
- Yarmouk
- Kazma
- Khaitan

(*) bankruptcy, did not compete.

=== Personnel and kits ===
Team	Kit manufacturer	Shirt sponsor
Al-Arabi	Macron (sportswear)	ahli Bank of Kuwait
Kuwait	HH	BMW
Qadsia	Givova	Samsung
Kazma	Givova	Viva
Al-Salmiya	HH	Sultan Centre
Al-Jahra	Givova	Viva
Al-Fahaheel	Givova	none
Khaitan SC	Zeus	Samsung
Al-Nasr	Givova	Viva
Sahel	Zeus	Viva
Al-Sulaibikhat	Zeus	LG
Al-Shabab	Uhlsport	None
Al-Yarmouk SC	adidas	Samsung

== Standings ==
Pos	Team	Pld	W	D	L	GF	GA	GD	Pts	Qualification or relegation
1	Qadsia (C)	24	20	2	2	75	12	+63	62	2017 AFC Champions League group stage
2	Al-Salmiya	24	19	3	2	52	19	+33	60	Qualification to the 2017 GCC Champions League
3	Kuwait	24	17	5	2	52	19	+33	56	2017 AFC Champions League 2nd qualifying round (Note: Kuwait Club are ensured a spot to the 2017 AFC Champions League Qualifying play-off as 2015–16 Kuwait Emir Cup winners.)
4	Kazma	24	12	8	4	55	32	+23	44	Qualification to the 2017 GCC Champions League
5	Al-Arabi	24	10	6	8	49	31	+18	36	
6	Khaitan	24	9	3	12	28	46	−18	30	
7	Al-Fahaheel	24	6	9	9	29	39	−10	27	
8	Sahel	24	7	6	11	22	41	−19	27	
9	Al-Jahra	24	8	3	13	31	54	−23	27	
10	Al-Sulaibikhat	24	6	6	12	28	46	−18	24	
11	Al-Shabab	24	7	3	14	24	49	−25	24	
12	Al-Yarmouk (R)	24	3	4	17	22	46	−24	13	Relegation to 2016–17 Kuwaiti Division One
13	Al-Nasr (R)	24	1	4	19	13	55	−42	7	Relegation to 2016–17 Kuwaiti Division One

Updated to match(es) played on 3 March 2016. Source:
Rules for classification: 1) points; 2) goal difference; 3) number of goals scored.
(C) Champions; (R) Relegated

== Awards ==
- Top Goal Scorer(Golden Boot): Firas Al-Khatib (23)
- Top Kuwaiti Goal Scorer: Bader Al-Mutawa (19)
- Most Assists: Ahmad Al-Dhefiri (12)
- Best Goalkeeper(Golden Glove): Khaled Al-Rashidi

== See also ==
- 2015-16 in Kuwaiti football
