= 2015–16 in Kuwaiti football =

2015–16 in Kuwaiti football includes several notable national tournaments held in Kuwait for the 2015-16 Football Season.

- 2015–16 Kuwaiti Premier League
- 2015–16 Kuwait Emir Cup
- 2015–16 Kuwait Crown Prince Cup
- 2015–16 Kuwait Federation Cup
- Kuwait Super Cup
