= 2008 Kuwait Super Cup =

Al-Arabi SC	Kuwait SC
1	0
- Date: 29 September 2008
- Venue: Sabah Al-Salem Stadium, Mansuriyah
- Man of the Match: Khaled Khalaf
- Attendance: 16,329

first edition of the Kuwait Super Cup won by Al-Arabi, Goal scored by Khaled Khalaf.
