= 2024–25 Kuwait Super Cup =

Tournament details
- Dates: January 24th 2025 – January 28th 2025
- Teams: 4

Final positions
- Champions: Kuwait SC
- Runners-up: Qadsia SC
- Semifinalists: Al-Salmiya; Al-Arabi

Tournament statistics
- Matches played: 3
- Goals scored: 8 (2.67 per match)

the 2024–25 Kuwait Super Cup was between league champions Al-Kuwait, Emir Cup winners and league 3rd placed Qadsia SC, league runners up Al-Arabi and league 4th placed Al-Salmiya.

== Qualified Teams ==
Club	How They Qualified
Al-Kuwait	Premier League champions
Al-Arabi	Premier League runners-up
Qadsia SC	Emir Cup champions and Premier League 3rd place
Al-Salmiya	Premier League 4th place

== Knockout ==
Semi-final
Al-Kuwait	4
Al-Salmiya	1
Al-Arabi	0
Al-Qadsia	1

Final
Al-Kuwait	1 (7)
Al-Qadsia	1 (6)

== Semi-Finals ==
24 January 2025
17:50 UTC+3

Al-Kuwait	4–1	Al-Salmiya
Alaa 17'; Zola 56'; Yousef 88'; Kameel 90+5'		Mendy 4'

Sulaibikhat Stadium
Referee: Iván Barton (El Salvador)
24 January 2025
20:15 UTC+3

Al-Arabi	0–1	Al-Qadsia
		Khafi 59'

Jaber Al-Ahmad International Stadium
Referee: Ammar Ashkanani

== Final ==
28 January 2025
21:15 UTC+3

Al-Kuwait	1–1	Al-Qadsia
Zanki 6'		Aboulfath 34' (o.g.)
Penalties
Jabrane (penalty scored); Nasser (penalty scored); Marhoon (penalty missed); Daham (penalty scored); Al Hajeri (penalty scored); Pourdara (penalty scored); Amoory (penalty scored); Al-Sanea (penalty scored)	7–6	(penalty scored) Al-Mutawa; (penalty scored) Khafi; (penalty scored) Dehiri; (penalty scored) Al-Faneeni; (penalty missed) Al-Dawsari; (penalty scored) Wadi; (penalty scored) El Ebrahim; (penalty missed) Ajibola

Jaber Al-Ahmad International Stadium
Attendance: 22,610
Referee: Vassilios Fotias (Greece)

== See also ==
- 2024-25 Kuwaiti Premier League
- 2025 Kuwaiti Division One
- 2024-25 Kuwait Emir Cup
- 2024-25 Kuwait Crown Prince Cup
