= 2013 Kuwait Super Cup =

| Al Qadsia | Al Kuwait |
| 3 | 1 |
- Date: 27 August 2013
- Venue: Al-Sadaqua Walsalam Stadium, Kuwait

The 2013 Kuwaiti-Supercup was the sixth Kuwait Super Cup, an annual football match contested by the winners of the previous season's Kuwaiti Premier League and Kuwait Emir Cup competitions. It featured AL Kuwait, winners of the 2012–13 Kuwaiti Premier League and the Kuwait Emir Cup runner-up Al Qadsia at Ali Al-Salem Al-Sabah Stadium.

== Match details ==
27 August 2013
18:45

| Al Qadsia | 3–1 | Al Kuwait |
|---|---|---|
| Saleh Al Sheikh 97'; Fahad Al Ansari 110'; Bader Al-Mutwa 113' | | Abdulhadi Khamis 100' |

Al-Sadaqua Walsalam Stadium, Adiliya, Kuwait City, Kuwait

| Al Qadsia | Al- Kuwait |
