= 2026–27 Kuwaiti Division One =

Kuwaiti Division One
- Season: 2026–27
- Dates: 8 October 2026 – 2027

41st edition of the tournament.

Ittihad Al-Shorta make their debut in the Kuwaiti Football League.

On October 1st 2026 the draw for the first 7 rounds of the Kuwaiti Division One took place.

== Changes ==
The following teams have changed divisions since the 2025–26 season:

=== To Division One ===
Relegated from Kuwait Premier League

No team was relegated due to the federation expanding the premier league to 12 teams.

=== From Division One ===
Promoted to Kuwait Premier League

- Al-Sahel
- Sulaibikhat

=== New Club ===
- Ittihad Al-Shorta

== Main league table ==
The main league, consisting of 7 teams in which the top two clubs get promoted.

Every team plays each other 4 times.

Pos	Team	Pld	W	D	L	GF	GA	GD	Pts	Promotion
1	Burgan	0	0	0	0	0	0	0	0	Promotion to the Kuwaiti Premier League
2	Ittihad Al-Shorta	0	0	0	0	0	0	0	0	Promotion to the Kuwaiti Premier League
3	Al-Jazeera	0	0	0	0	0	0	0	0	
4	Khaitan	0	0	0	0	0	0	0	0	
5	Al-Shamiya	0	0	0	0	0	0	0	0	
6	Sporty	0	0	0	0	0	0	0	0	
7	Yarmouk	0	0	0	0	0	0	0	0	

Updated to match(es) played on 4 October 2026. Source:
Rules for classification: 1) Points; 2) Head-to-head points; 3.1) Head-to-head goal difference; 3.2) Goal difference; 3.3) Goals scored; 3.4) Total wins; 3.5) Fair play score; 4) Play-offs

== See also ==
- 2026-27 Kuwaiti Premier League
- 2026-27 Kuwait Super Cup
- 2026-27 Kuwait Emir Cup
- 2026-27 Kuwait Crown Prince Cup
