= 2019–20 Kuwait Crown Prince Cup =

Tournament details
- Country: Kuwait
- Teams: 15

Final positions
- Champions: Al-Arabi
- Runners-up: Kuwait

Tournament statistics
- Matches played: 15
- Goals scored: 37 (2.47 per match)

This will be the 27th edition of Kuwait Crown Prince Cup where the 15 teams are in a knockout stage.

Kuwait SC are the defending champions.

== Bracket ==
Draw was held on 11 November 2019.

Round of 16
H	Kuwait SC
A	N/A
H	AL-Yarmouk SC	5
A	Al Tadhamon SC	4
H	Khaitan SC	0 (3)
A	Al-Sahel SC	0 (1)
A	Al-Fahaheel FC	1 (5)
H	Al-Salmiya SC	1 (4)
A	Qadsia SC	0 (6)
H	Al-Arabi SC	0 (7)
A	burgan SC	1 (6)
H	kazma SC	1 (5)
A	Al-Jahra SC	2
H	Al-Sulaibikhat SC	1
H	Al-Shabab SC	1
A	Al-Nasr SC	2

Quarter-finals
A	Kuwait SC	2
H	AL-Yarmouk SC	0
A	Al-Fahaheel FC	0
H	Khaitan SC	2
H	Al-Arabi SC	3
A	burgan SC	1
H	Al-Sulaibikhat SC	0
A	Al-Nasr SC	2

Semi-finals
A	Kuwait SC	2
H	Khaitan SC	0
H	Al-Arabi SC	1
A	Al-Nasr SC	0

Final
–	Kuwait SC	0 (3)
–	Al-Arabi SC	0 (2)
Third place
–	Al-Nasr SC	3
–	Khaitan SC	2

Note: H: Home team, A: Away team

=== Final ===
7-1-2020	Al-Arabi SC (Kuwait)	0-0 (a.e.t.) (2-3 p)	Kuwait SC (Kuwait)	Jaber Al-Ahmad International Stadium
17:45				Attendance: 25,200
