= 2025–26 Kuwait Super Cup =

Tournament details
- Dates: January 2026 – January 2026
- Teams: 4

Final positions
- Champions: Qadsia
- Runners-up: Kuwait

Tournament statistics
- Matches played: 3
- Goals scored: 11 (3.67 per match)

the 2025–26 Kuwait Super Cup was between league champions Al-Kuwait, Emir Cup winners, league runners up Al-Arabi and league 3rd placed Qadsia SC and league 4th placed Al-Salmiya.

== Qualified Teams ==
Club	How They Qualified
Al-Kuwait	Premier League champions
Al-Arabi	Premier League runners-up
Qadsia SC	Premier League 3rd place
Al-Salmiya	Premier League 4th place

== Semi-Finals ==
28 January 2026
16:20

Al-Kuwait	2-0	Al-Salmiya
Marhoon 13'; Khenissi 70'

Sulaibikhat Stadium
28 January 2026

Al-Arabi	3-4	Al-Qadsia
Iwuala 2'; Al-Aswad 9'; Fadiga 13'		Faneeni 1'; Al-Dhefiri 57'; Al-Awadhi 85'; Al-Mutawa 90+8'

Jaber Al-Ahmad International Stadium

== Final ==
1 February 2026
19:30

Qadsia	1-1	Kuwait
Mbengue 38'		Marhoon 48'
Penalties
	4–3

== See also ==
- 2025-26 Kuwaiti Premier League
- 2025 Kuwaiti Division One
- 2025-26 Kuwait Emir Cup
- 2025-26 Kuwait Crown Prince Cup
