= 2018–19 Kuwait Crown Prince Cup =

Tournament details
- Country: Kuwait
- Teams: 15

Final positions
- Champions: Kuwait
- Runners-up: Qadsia

Tournament statistics
- Matches played: 14
- Goals scored: 38 (2.71 per match)

This will be the 26th edition of Kuwait Crown Prince Cup where the 15 teams are in a knockout stage.

Qadsia SC are the defending champions.

== Bracket ==
Draw was held on 24 July 2018.

Round of 16
H	Qadsia SC
A	N/A
H	AL-Yarmouk SC	1(2)
A	Al-Fahaheel FC	1(4)
H	Al-Arabi SC	2
A	Burgan SC	0
A	Al-Sahel SC	1
H	Al-Jahra SC	3
A	Kuwait SC	3
H	Kazma SC	1
A	Al-Sulaibikhat SC	0
H	Al-Salmiya SC	2
A	Al-Shabab SC	2
H	Khaitan SC	4
H	Al Tadhamon SC	1
A	Al-Nasr SC	4

Quarter-finals
A	Qadsia SC	3
H	Al-Fahaheel FC	0
A	Al-Arabi SC	1
H	Al-Jahra SC	0
H	Kuwait SC	2
A	Al-Salmiya SC	0
H	Khaitan SC	0
A	Al-Nasr SC	2

Semi-finals
A	Qadsia SC	2
H	Al-Arabi SC	1
H	Kuwait SC	1
A	Al-Nasr SC

Final
–	Qadsia SC	0
–	Kuwait SC	1

Note: H: Home team, A: Away team
