= 2016–17 Kuwait Crown Prince Cup =

Tournament details
- Country: Kuwait
- Teams: 15

Final positions
- Champions: Kuwait SC (6th title)
- Runners-up: Qadsia SC

Tournament statistics
- Matches played: 71
- Goals scored: 142 (2 per match)

The 2016–17 Kuwait Crown Prince Cup was the 24th edition of the competition. The 15 participating teams were divided into two groups, with the top two teams from each group advancing to the semifinals.

Al-Salmiya SC were the defending champions.

== Group-Stage ==
=== Group A ===
Team	Pld	W	D	L	GF	GA	GD	Pts	
(Kuwait) Qadsia SC	6	5	1	0	14	1	+13	16	Advanced to Semi-finals
(Kuwait) Al-Jahra SC	6	3	2	1	12	6	+6	11	Advanced to Semi-finals
(Kuwait) Al-Yarmouk SC	6	3	1	2	8	6	+2	10	
(Kuwait) Al-Sahel SC	6	3	1	2	5	3	+2	10	
(Kuwait) Khaitan SC	6	2	1	3	3	7	-4	7	
(Kuwait) Al-Sulaibikhat SC	6	1	2	3	4	10	-6	5	
(Kuwait) Al-Fahaheel FC	6	0	0	6	2	15	-13	0	

=== Group B ===
Team	Pld	W	D	L	GF	GA	GD	Pts	
Al Kuwait	7	5	2	0	14	1	+13	17	Advanced to Semi-finals
(Kuwait) Al-Salmiya SC	7	5	1	1	13	6	+7	16	Advanced to Semi-finals
(Kuwait) Al-Arabi SC	7	5	1	1	11	6	+5	16	
(Kuwait) Kazma SC	7	4	1	2	23	14	+9	13	
(Kuwait) Al Tadhamon SC	7	3	0	4	15	13	+2	9	
(Kuwait) Al-Shabab SC	7	2	0	5	8	19	-11	6	
(Kuwait) Burgan SC	7	1	0	6	8	17	-9	3	
(Kuwait) Al-Nasr SC	7	0	1	6	2	16	-14	1	

Ref:

== Knockouts ==
Semi-Finals
H	Qadsia SC	4
A	Al-Salmiya SC	0
A	Al-Jahra SC	0
H	Kuwait SC	5

Final
H	Qadsia SC	0 (3)
A	Kuwait SC	0 (5)

=== Matches ===
==== Semi-finals ====
21-12-2016	Qadsia SC (Kuwait)	4–0	Al-Salmiya SC (Kuwait)	Jaber Al-Ahmad International Stadium

21-12-2016	Kuwait SC	5–0	Al-Jahra SC (Kuwait)	Jaber Al-Ahmad International Stadium

==== Final ====
2016–17 Kuwait Crown Prince Cup Final

26-12-2016	Qadsia SC (Kuwait)	0–0 (a.e.t.) (3–5 p)	Kuwait SC	Jaber Al-Ahmad International Stadium
Final
