= 2015–16 Kuwait Crown Prince Cup =

Tournament details
- Country: Kuwait
- Teams: 15

Final positions
- Champions: Al-Salmiya SC
- Runners-up: Kuwait SC

Tournament statistics
- Matches played: 14
- Goals scored: 44 (3.14 per match)
- Top goal scorer: Patrick Fabiano (3)

This is the 22nd edition of the tournament and first appearance for Burgan SC, while rules have changed that there are no more 2 legged matches all from 1 knockout match.

Al-Arabi SC are defending champions.

== Preliminary round ==
=== Round 1 ===
Burgan SC	0-1 (a.e.t.)	Al-Tadamun SC
			Attendance: 12

=== Round 2 ===
Al-Tadamun SC	0-5	Al-Sahel SC
			Attendance: 18

Al-Fahaheel FC	1-1 (PSO 1-3) (a.e.t.)	Al-Shabab SC
			Attendance: 18

=== Round 3 ===
Al-Nasr SC (Kuwait)	1-1 (PSO 3-2) (a.e.t.)	Al-Sahel SC
			Attendance: 7

Al-Shabab SC	3-1	Al-Yarmouk SC
			Attendance: 20

=== Round 4 ===
21 September 2015	Al-Shabab SC	1-2	Khaitan SC

21 September 2015	Al-Nasr SC	1-2	Al-Sulaibikhat SC

== Knockout stage ==
The knockout stages of the tournament is from 1 match only. The top 6 teams of the league and the 2 winners of round 3 advance to the quarter-finals.

Teams:

- Al-Arabi SC

Current champions 2nd in League

- Kuwait SC

1st in League

- Al-Jahra SC

3rd in League

- Qadsia SC

4th in League

- Al-Salmiya SC

5th in League

- Kazma SC

6th in League

- Khaitan SC

Preminlary Round winner

- Al-Sulaibikhat SC

Preminlary Round winner

=== Quarter-finals ===
7-12-2015	Kuwait SC	3-0	Al-Sulaibikhat FC	Kuwait SC Stadium
17:35 (KSA)

7-12-2015	Al-Arabi	1-2	Al-Salmiya SC	Sabah Al-Salem Stadium
19:40 (KSA)

8-12-2015	Al-Jahra SC	2-3 (a.e.t.)	Khaitan SC
17:25 (KSA)

7-12-2015	Qadsia SC	3-4 (a.e.t.)	Kazma SC	Hamad Al-Hamad Stadium
19:40 (KSA)

=== Semi-finals ===
21-12-2015	Kuwait SC	2-1	Khaitan SC	Kuwait SC Stadium
17:30 (KSA)

21-12-2015	Al-Salmiya SC	1-0 (a.e.t.)	Kazma SC	Thamir Stadium
20:45 (KSA)

== Final ==
12-1-2016	Kuwait SC	0-1	Al-Salmiya SC	Jaber Al-Ahmad International Stadium
17:30 (KSA)			Faisal Al Enezi

== See also ==
- 2015-16 in Kuwaiti football
