= 2019 Kuwait Super Cup =

Kuwait SC	Qadsia SC
0	1
- Date: 12 December 2019
- Venue: Jaber Al-Ahmad International Stadium, Ardiya, Farwaniya
- Referee: Abdullah Alkandari
- Attendance: 5,624

the 2019 Kuwait Super Cup was between league and Emir Cup champions Kuwait SC and Crown Prince Cup winners Qadsia SC.

== Match details ==
12 December 2019
18:30 MT

Kuwait SC	0–1	Qadsia SC
	Report	Okwuosa 72'

Jaber Al-Ahmad International Stadium, Kuwait City
Referee: Abdullah Al-Kandari
