= 2008 Kuwait Crown Prince Cup =

The Crown Prince Cup was one of four competitions in the Kuwaiti 2007/2008 season, and all 14 clubs participated in this championship.

Al Kuwait were the winners.

== First round ==
Team 1	Agg.	Team 2	1st leg	2nd leg
Al Fahaheel (Kuwait)	4-7	(Kuwait) Al Jahra	0–1	4-6
Tadamon (Kuwait)	3-1	(Kuwait) Al Yarmouk	1–0	2-1
Kazma (Kuwait)	2-2*	(Kuwait) Al Naser	1–2	1-0
Sulaibikhat (Kuwait)	1-2	(Kuwait) Al Salmiya	1–1	0-1
Khaitan (Kuwait)	4-2	(Kuwait) Al Shabab	1–0	3-2
Al Qadsia (Kuwait)	5-2	(Kuwait) Sahel	3–1	2-1

- The Away goal rule is not used in this competition, so both teams played again on a neutral stadium. After a 2–2 draw in the playoff match Kazma won 5–4 on penalties.

== Quarterfinal ==
Al Kuwait & Al Arabi received BYE's to this round.

Team 1	Agg.	Team 2	1st leg	2nd leg
Tadamon (Kuwait)	2-2*	(Kuwait) Al Jahra	1–0	1-2
Al Kuwait	1-1*	(Kuwait) Kazma	1–1	0-0
Al Arabi (Kuwait)	0-1	(Kuwait) Al Salmiya	0–0	0-1
Al Qadsia (Kuwait)	7-1	(Kuwait) Khaitan	4–1	3-0

- The Away goal rule is not used in this competition, so both teams played again on a neutral stadium.

Playoff matches:

- Tadamon 2-1 Al Jahra
- Al Kuwait 0-0(5-4 on PK) Kazma

== Semifinals ==
Team 1	Agg.	Team 2	1st leg	2nd leg
Al Kuwait	5-3	(Kuwait) Tadamon	2–1	3-2
Al Salmiya (Kuwait)	0-2	(Kuwait) Al Qadsia	0–2	0-0

== Third place play-off ==
All times given as local time (UTC+3)

2008-03-02
17:00

Tadamon	0 – 0 (3 – 5 pen.)	Al Salmiya

Al-Sadaqua Walsalam Stadium, Kuwait

== Final ==
2008-03-03
18:15

Al Kuwait	1 – 0 (aet)	Al Qadsia
André Macanga 108'

Al Kuwait Sports Club Stadium, Kuwait
