= 2015–16 Kuwait Emir Cup =

Tournament details
- Country: Kuwait
- Teams: 15

Final positions
- Champions: Kuwait SC
- Runners-up: Al-Arabi SC

Tournament statistics
- Matches played: 14
- Goals scored: 32 (2.29 per match)
- Top goal scorer: Yassine Salhi (5)

54th edition of the tournament will feature 15 teams including Burgan SC for the first time.

Qadsia SC enter as defending champions as last season winners.

== Preliminary round ==
29-12-2015	Burgan SC	1-0	Al-Tadamun SC
	Tarik Lugman

== Round 1 ==
- Preliminary round winner:

Burgan SC

26-1-2016	Burgan SC	0-1	Al-Sahel SC
17:55 (KSA)

26-1-2016	Al-Shabab SC	3-3 (a.e.t.) (10-11 p)	Al-Fahaheel FC
17:55 (KSA)

== Round 2 ==
- Round 1 winners:

Al-Sahel SC
Al-Fahaheel FC

9-2-2016	Al-Nasr SC	3-0	Al-Sahel SC
18:00 (KSA)

9-2-2016	Al-Fahaheel FC	0-1	Al-Yarmouk SC
18:00 (KSA)

== Round 3 ==
- Round 2 winners:

Al-Yarmouk SC
Al-Nasr SC

23-2-2016	Al-Nasr SC	0-1 (a.e.t.)	Khaitan SC
18:35 (KSA)

23-2-2016	Al-Yarmouk SC	1-0	Al-Sulaibikhat SC
19:15 (KSA)

== Quarter-finals ==
- Round 3 winners:

Khaitan SC
Al-Yarmouk SC

- Seeded teams:

Al-Arabi SC
Qadsia SC
Kuwait SC
Al-Salmiya SC
Al-Jahra SC
Kazma SC

7-2-2016	Kuwait SC	4-0	Khaitan SC	Kuwait stadium
18:35 (KSA)				Attendance: 78

7-2-2016	Al-Arabi SC	2-0	Al-Yarmouk SC	Sabah Al-Salem Stadium
18:35 (KSA)				Attendance: 3,242

8-2-2016	Al-Salmiya SC	2-0	Al-Jahra SC
18:35 (KSA)				Attendance: 1,211

8-2-2016	Qadsia SC	1-0	Kazma SC
18:35 (KSA)

== Semi-finals ==
- Quarter-finals winners:

Kuwait SC
Al-Arabi SC
Al-Salmiya SC
Qadsia SC

15-2-2016	Al-Arabi SC	4-0	Al-Salmiya SC	Kuwait stadium
18:35 (KSA)

15-2-2016	Qadsia SC	0-1	Kuwait SC	Sabah Al-Salem Stadium

== Final ==
5-4-2016	Al-Arabi SC	1-3	Kuwait SC	Jaber Al-Ahmad International Stadium

== See also ==
- 2015-16 in Kuwaiti football
