= 2018 Kuwait Super Cup =

Kuwait SC	Qadsia SC
1	2
- Date: 13 August 2018
- Venue: Sabah Al Salem Stadium, Mansuriyah, Kuwait City
- Attendance: 5,624

the 2018 Kuwait Super Cup was between league and Emir Cup champions Kuwait SC and Crown Prince Cup winners Qadsia SC.
