= 2017 Kuwait Super Cup =

| Kuwait SC | Qadsia SC |
| 0 | 0 |
- Kuwait SC won 5-4 on penalties.
- Date: 7 September 2017
- Venue: Jaber Al-Ahmad International Stadium, Ardiya, Farwaniya

The 2017 Kuwait Super Cup was between league, Crown Cup and Emir Cup champions Kuwait SC and League Runners-up Qadsia SC. Kuwait SC won 5-4 on penalties after 0-0 draw at full time.
