= 2012–13 Kuwait Crown Prince Cup =

Tournament details
- Country: Kuwait
- Teams: 14

Final positions
- Champions: Al Qadsia
- Runners-up: Al Arabi

Tournament statistics
- Matches played: 25
- Goals scored: 71 (2.84 per match)
- Top goal scorer: Garcia (5 goals)

Awards
- Best player: Bader Al-Mutawa

The 2012–13 Kuwait Crown Prince Cup is a cup competition involving teams from the Kuwaiti Premier League and the Kuwaiti Division One league. The competition has continued to be played in the beginning of the season but has reverted to a knockout tournament played over two legs. The previous edition was played in a group staged round robin format.

Al Arabi are the defending champions and enter at the second round stage (quarter-finals) along with league winners Al Qadsia.

== First round ==
Team 1	Agg.	Team 2	1st leg	2nd leg
Al Yarmouk (Kuwait)	2–4	(Kuwait) Kazma	1–1	1–3
Al Fahaheel (Kuwait)	0–5	(Kuwait) Tadamon	0–3	0–2
Salmiya (Kuwait)	1–4	(Kuwait) Al Salibikhaet	1–2	0–2
Al Naser (Kuwait)	4–1	(Kuwait) Al Sahel	4–0	0-1
Al Jahra (Kuwait)	0–0 (4–3 pens)	(Kuwait) Khaitan	0–0	0–0
Al Kuwait	7–1	(Kuwait) Al Shabab	4–0	3–1

== Quarter finals ==
Team 1	Agg.	Team 2	1st leg	2nd leg
Al Jahra (Kuwait)	4–3	(Kuwait) Al Salibikhaet	2–2	2–1
Kazma (Kuwait)	6–5	(Kuwait) Al Naser	2–4	4–1
Al Qadsia (Kuwait)	6–1	(Kuwait) Tadamon	5–1	1–0
Al Kuwait	2–2 (2–3 pens.)	(Kuwait) Al Arabi	1–1	1–1

== Semi finals ==
Team 1	Agg.	Team 2	1st leg	2nd leg
Al Arabi (Kuwait)	4–2	(Kuwait) Kazma	3–1	1–1
Al Qadsia (Kuwait)	3–0	(Kuwait) Al Jahra	2–0	1–0

== Final ==
Team 1	Score	Team 2
Al Arabi (Kuwait)	1–3	(Kuwait) Al Qadsia
