= 2015–16 Kuwait Federation Cup =

Tournament details
- Country: Kuwait
- Teams: 14

Final positions
- Champions: Kazma SC
- Runners-up: Kuwait SC

Tournament statistics
- Matches played: 47
- Goals scored: 198 (4.21 per match)
- Top goal scorer: Tiago Queiroz Bezerra (5)

Awards
- Best player: Tiago Queiroz Bezerra

the 19th edition of the Kuwait Federation Cup tournament but without Al-Sulaibikhat SC due to the club withdrew from it.

Kuwait SC enter as defending champions.

== Group A ==
Final Standings:

Team	Pld	W	D	L	GF	GA	GD	Pts
Al Kuwait	6	5	1	0	29	4	+25	16
(Kuwait) Kazma SC	6	5	0	1	23	3	+20	15
(Kuwait) Al-Shabab SC	6	4	0	2	10	9	+1	12
(Kuwait) Khaitan SC	6	2	1	3	12	14	-2	7
(Kuwait) Burgan SC	6	2	0	4	16	20	-4	6
(Kuwait) Al-Jahra SC	6	2	0	4	6	21	-15	6
(Kuwait) Al-Nasr SC	6	0	0	6	3	28	-25	0

== Group B ==
Final Standings:

Team	Pld	W	D	L	GF	GA	GD	Pts
(Kuwait) Al-Salmiya SC	6	4	1	1	14	9	+5	13
Al-Arabi SC (Kuwait)	6	3	3	0	16	4	+12	12
(Kuwait) Al-Sahel SC	6	4	0	2	17	8	+9	12
(Kuwait) Qadsia SC	6	2	2	2	14	11	+3	8
(Kuwait) Fahaheel (football club)	6	2	1	3	11	12	-1	7
(Kuwait) Al-Yarmouk SC	6	1	2	3	5	9	-4	5
(Kuwait) Al-Tadamun SC	6	0	1	5	2	26	-24	0

== Semi-finals ==
=== 1st legs ===
27 October 2015

(Kuwait) Al-Arabi	0-4	Kuwait SC

Kuwait SC Stadium Kuwait
27 October 2015

(Kuwait) Kazma SC	2-3	Al-Salmiya SC (Kuwait)

Kuwait

=== 2nd legs ===
2 November 2015

(Kuwait) Al-Arabi	2-1	Kuwait SC

Sabah Al-Salem Stadium Kuwait
2 November 2015

(Kuwait) Kazma SC	1-0	Al-Salmiya SC (Kuwait)

Kuwait

== Final ==
10 November 2015

(Kuwait) Kazma SC	2 – 1	Kuwait SC

Kuwait

== See also ==
- 2015-16 in Kuwaiti football
