= 2012 Kuwait Super Cup =

Qadsia SC	Al-Arabi SC
1	2
- Date: 3 September 2012
- Venue: Al Kuwait Sports Club Stadium, Kaifan
- Man of the Match: Ahmad Hayel
- Attendance: 12,201

The 2012 Kuwait Super Cup was the fifth edition of the Kuwait Super Cup. It was contested between 2011–12 Kuwaiti Premier League champions Qadsia SC and 2011–12 Kuwait Crown Prince Cup champions Al-Arabi SC held on 3 September 2012. This was the first Super Cup match to feature the two Kuwaiti El Clásico clubs. Al-Arabi won the match 2–1 to win their second Super Cup title.
