= 2016 Kuwait Super Cup =

Qadsia SC	Kuwait SC
2	2
- Kuwait SC won 3-2 on penalties
- Date: 21 September 2016
- Venue: Jaber Al-Ahmad International Stadium, Ardiya, Farwaniya
- Attendance: 37,329

the 2016 Kuwait Super Cup was between league champions Qadsia SC and Emir cup champions Kuwait SC. This was the first super cup held in Jaber Al-Ahmad International Stadium. Kuwait SC won 3–2 on penalties.
