= 2014–15 Kuwaiti Premier League =

Kuwaiti Premier League
- Season: 2014–15
- Champions: Kuwait SC
- AFC Cup: Kuwait SC; Al-Arabi SC
- Matches: 182
- Goals: 001 (0.01 per match)
- Top goalscorer: Patrick Fabiano 22 goals
- Biggest home win: Kuwait SC 9-0
- Highest scoring: Kuwait SC 9-0
- Longest winning run: Al-Arabi SC 12
- Longest unbeaten run: Kuwait SC 26 matches

The 2014-15 Kuwaiti Premier League season was the 53rd season of the Kuwait Premier League, Kuwait's highest football league. The season saw 14 teams compete, with Kuwait SC being crowned as champions with an undefeated 20-6-0 record. Patrick Fabiano led the league with 22 goals.

As the top two teams, Kuwait SC and Al-Arabi SC both qualified for the 2016 Asian Football Confederation (AFC) Cup, an international association football competition between domestic Asian clubs. However, the teams were unable to participate due to the Kuwait Football Association's suspension by FIFA on 16 October 2015. The ban was not lifted until 6 December 2017.

== Standings ==
Pos	Team	Pld	W	D	L	GF	GA	GD	Pts	Qualification
1	Kuwait SC (C)	26	20	6	0	78	12	+66	66	Qualification to the 2016 AFC Champions League Preliminary Round
2	Al Arabi	26	21	3	2	74	12	+62	66	Qualification to the 2016 GCC Champions League
3	Al Jahra	26	18	4	4	46	35	+11	58	Qualification to the 2016 GCC Champions League
4	Qadsia SC	26	17	5	4	60	20	+40	56	Qualification to the 2016 AFC Cup Group Stage
5	Al Salmiya	26	16	7	3	69	24	+45	55	
6	Kazma SC	26	15	6	5	54	47	+7	51	
7	Al Sulaibikhat	26	11	3	12	45	47	−2	36	
8	Al Nasr	26	9	6	11	40	42	−2	33	
9	Khaitan	26	8	4	14	23	44	−21	28	
10	Al Yarmouk	26	7	6	13	21	41	−20	27	
11	Al Tadamun	26	4	7	15	27	51	−24	19	
12	Al Shabab	26	4	6	16	19	48	−29	18	
13	Al Sahel	26	5	3	18	28	51	−23	18	
14	Fahaheel	26	3	4	19	21	58	−37	13	

Updated to match(es) played on 3. Source:
Rules for classification: 1) points; 2) goal difference; 3) number of goals scored.
(C) Champions
