= 2024–25 Kuwaiti Premier League =

Kuwaiti Premier League
- Season: 2024–25
- Dates: 8 August 2024 – 11 May 2025
- Champions: Al-Kuwait (20th title)
- Relegated: Khaitan; Al-Yarmouk
- AFC Challenge League group stage: Al-Kuwait
- AFC Challenge League qualifiers: Al-Arabi
- AGCFF Gulf Club Champions League: Al-Qadsia
- Top goalscorer: (Brazil) Vitor Vieira (22 goals)
- Biggest home win: Al-Kuwait 5–0 Khaitan
- Biggest away win: Al Naser 1–5 Al-Kuwait
- Highest scoring: Al-Fahaheel 7–4 Qadsia
- All statistics correct as of 15 July 2025.

The 2024–25 season for the Kuwait Premier League is the 63rd season of professional football played in Kuwait.

Kuwait SC are the defending champions.

== Changes ==
The following teams have changed divisions since the 2023–24 season:

=== To Premier League ===
Promoted from the Kuwaiti Division One

- Al-Yarmouk
- Al-Tadamon

=== From Premier League ===
Relegated to the Kuwaiti Division One

- Al-Jahra
- Al-Shabab

== Teams ==
=== Stadia and locations ===
Team	City/Town	Stadium	Capacity
Al-Kuwait	Kaifan	Al Kuwait SC Stadium	18,500
Al Arabi	Mansouria,	Sabah Al Salem Stadium	28,000
Al-Qadsia	Hawalli	Mohammed Al-Hamad Stadium	22,000
Al-Salmiya	Salmiya	Thamir Stadium	16,105
Fahaheel	Fahaheel	Fahaheel Stadium	3,000
Al Naser	Ardiya	Ali Al-Salem Stadium	10,000
Kazma	Adiliya	Al-Sadaqua Walsalam Stadium	21,500
Khaitan	Khaitan	Khaitan Stadium	10,000
Al-Yarmouk	Mishref	Abdullah Alkhalifa Satduim	12,000
Al-Tadamon	Farwaniya	Farwaniya Stadium	14,000

== Foreign players ==
Clubs can register a total of five foreign players throughout the season, in addition to two Kuwaiti-born players, but five of them are allowed to participate in the match.

Team	Player 1	Player 2	Player 3	Player 4	Player 5
Al-Kuwait	(Morocco) Amine Aboulfath	(Morocco) Yahya Jabrane	(Democratic Republic of the Congo) Arsène Zola	(Tunisia) Taha Yassine Khenissi	(Bahrain) Mohamed Marhoon
Al Arabi	(Morocco) Hamza Khabba	(Nigeria) Anayo Iwuala	(Algeria) Sofiane Bouchar	(Bahrain) Kamil Al-Aswad	(Brazil) Jacó
Al-Qadsia	(Brazil) Igor Rossi	(Morocco) Mehdi Berrahma	(Morocco) Ismail Khafi	(Nigeria) Daniel Ajibola	(Libya) Mohammed Soulah
Salmiya	(Tunisia) Imed Louati	(Morocco) Younes Najjari	(Brazil) Alex Lima	(Libya) Al-Senussi Al-Hadi	(The Gambia) Sang Pierre Mendy
Fahaheel	(Brazil) Carlos Perino	(Brazil) Rodrigo Yuri	(Brazil) Uilliam Barros Pereira	(Ghana) Robin Addo	(Brazil) Vitor Vieira
Al Naser	(Iraq) Karrar Amer	(Morocco) Zakaria El Wardi	(Nigeria) Olawale Onanuga	(Brazil) Bernardo Vilar	(Dominican Republic) Carlos Ventura
Kazma	(Brazil) Dodô	(Colombia) Hansel Zapata	(Jordan) Ahmad Ersan	(Algeria) Reza Binsha	
Khaitan	(Brazil) Luiz Fernando	(Bahrain) Prince Obus Aggreh	(Nigeria) Chigozie Mbah	(Nigeria) Chima Akas	(Cameroon) Donovan Ewolo
Al-Tadamon	(Guinea-Bissau) Bubacar Djaló	(Chad) Casimir Ninga	(Senegal) Mame Saher Thioune	(Senegal) Seydina Keita	(Senegal) Birahim Gaye
Al-Yarmouk	(Ivory Coast) Kialy Abdoul Koné	(Morocco) Habib Allah Dahmani	(Iran) Reza Yazdandoost	(Morocco) Ayoub Lakhdar	(Italy) Mario Fontanella

== Main league table ==
The main league, consisting of 10 teams in which the top six clubs competing in the league and the last four clubs qualifying for the relegation group are determined.

Pos	Team	Pld	W	D	L	GF	GA	GD	Pts	Qualification or relegation
1	Al-Kuwait (Q)	18	15	2	1	52	11	+41	47	Qualification for Championship Play-offs
2	Al-Arabi (Q)	18	14	3	1	35	12	+23	45	Qualification for Championship Play-offs
3	Al-Qadsia (Q)	18	11	2	5	29	21	+8	35	Qualification for Championship Play-offs
4	Al-Salmiya (Q)	18	8	5	5	32	28	+4	29	Qualification for Championship Play-offs
5	Al-Fahaheel (Q)	18	8	4	6	34	29	+5	28	Qualification for Championship Play-offs
6	Al-Tadamon (Q)	18	6	2	10	25	37	−12	20	Qualification for Championship Play-offs
7	Kazma (Q)	18	5	4	9	21	26	−5	19	Qualification for Relegation play-offs
8	Al-Nasar (Q)	18	3	3	12	19	38	−19	12	Qualification for Relegation play-offs
9	Khaitan (Q)	18	2	5	11	12	30	−18	11	Qualification for Relegation play-offs
10	Al-Yarmouk (Q)	18	0	6	12	17	44	−27	6	Qualification for Relegation play-offs

(Q) Qualified for the phase indicated

=== Results ===
Home \ Away	KUW	ARA	QAD	SAL	FAH	TAD	KAZ	NAS	KHA	YAR
Al-Kuwait		2–0	1–0	3–1	3–0	3–1	1–0	6–0	5–0	6–0
Al Arabi	0–0		2–1	1–1	3–0	1–0	2–0	2–1	2–1	2–0
Al-Qadsia	2–1	2–4		0–1	2–0	3–1	3–2	2–1	2–0	1–0
Al-Salmiya	3–4	1–3	1–2		2–2	2–1	3–1	3–1	1–0	2–1
Fahaheel	0–3	1–3	1–2	2–2		2–0	4–0	3–1	1–0	4–1
Al-Tadamon	0–3	2–3	0–3	0–2	2–2		2–1	1–0	2–1	3–2
Kazma	1–1	0–3	0–0	4–3	1–1	4–0		0–1	2–0	2–0
Al Nasar	1–5	0–3	3–0	1–2	1–3	0–2	1–1		0–2	2–2
Khaitan	1–2	0–0	1–2	1–1	1–4	1–4	1–0	1–1		1–1
Al-Yarmouk	1–3	0–1	2–2	1–1	2–4	4–4	0–2	0–4	0–0	

Legend: Blue = home team win; Yellow = draw; Red = away team win.

== Championship play-offs ==
The top 6 Teams will play in the Championship play-offs

Pos	Team	Pld	W	D	L	GF	GA	GD	Pts	Qualification
1	Al-Kuwait (C)	23	19	3	1	67	15	+52	60	Qualification for AFC Challenge League group stage
2	Al-Arabi	23	17	4	2	45	17	+28	55	Qualification for AFC Challenge League qualifiers (Note: Since the Kuwait Emir Cup couldn't be completed in time for due to tightness of schedules, the AFC Challenge League playoff spot was passed to the Premier League runners-up.)
3	Al-Qadsia	23	12	2	9	40	37	+3	38	Qualification for the AGCFF Gulf Club Champions League group stage
4	Al-Salmiya	23	10	6	7	42	40	+2	36	
5	Al-Fahaheel	23	9	8	6	45	37	+8	35	
6	Al-Tadamon	23	6	3	14	27	52	−25	21	

(C) Champions

=== Results ===
Home \ Away	KUW	ARA	QAD	SAL	FAH	TAD
Al-Kuwait		2–1	3–1	5–0	2–2	3–0
Al-Arabi	1–2		1–0	3–2	1–1	4–0
Al-Qadsia	1–3	0–1		2–4	4–7	5–1
Al-Salmiya	0–5	2–3	4–2		1–1	1–3
Al-Fahaheel	2–2	1–1	7–4	0–0		0–0
Al-Tadamon	1–3	0–4	1–5	1–3	0–0	

Updated to match(es) played on 20 April 2025. Source:
Legend: Blue = home team win; Yellow = draw; Red = away team win.

== Relegation play-offs ==
The bottom 4 Teams will play in the Relegation play-offs

Pos	Team	Pld	W	D	L	GF	GA	GD	Pts	Relegation
1	Kazma	21	5	6	10	24	30	−6	21	
2	Al-Nasar	21	5	4	12	26	41	−15	19	
3	Khaitan (R)	21	2	6	13	14	36	−22	12	Relegation to Kuwaiti Division One
4	Al-Yarmouk (R)	21	2	6	13	25	51	−26	12	Relegation to Kuwaiti Division One

(R) Relegated

=== Results ===
Home \ Away	KAZ	NAS	KHA	YAR
Kazma		0–0	1–1	2–3
Al Nasar	0–0		2–1	5–2
Khaitan	1–1	1–2		0–3
Al-Yarmouk	3–2	2–5	3–0	

Updated to match(es) played on 15 July 2025. Source:
Legend: Blue = home team win; Yellow = draw; Red = away team win.

== Statistics ==
=== Top scorers ===
As of 15 July 2025

Rank	Player	Team	Goals
1	(Brazil) Vitor Da silva Vieira	Fahaheel	22
2	(Kuwait) Yousef Nasser	Al-Kuwait	14
3	(Bahrain) Mohamed Marhoon	Al-Kuwait	13
4	(Tunisia) Taha Yassine Khenissi	Al-Kuwait	12
4	(Tunisia) Imed Louati	Al-Salmiya	12
4	(Morocco) Hamza Khabba	Al-Arabi	12

=== Top assisters ===
As of 15 July 2025

Rank	Player	Team	Assists
1	(Kuwait) Ali Khalaf	Al-Arabi	8
2	(Kuwait) Mohammad Daham	Al-Kuwait	7
3	(Egypt) Amro Abdelfatah	Al-Kuwait	6
3	(Kuwait) Sami Al Sanea	Al-Kuwait	6
3	(Brazil) Rodrigo Yuri	Fahaheel	6

=== Top saves & clean sheets ===
As of 15 July 2025

Rank	Player	Team	Saves	Clean sheets
1	(Kuwait) Sulaiman Abdulghafour	Al-Arabi SC	32	11
2	(Kuwait) Saud Al-Houshan	Kuwait	29	9
3	(Kuwait) Hussain Kankone	Kazma	26	5
4	(Kuwait) Abdulrahman Al Fadhli	Al-Salmiya	24	4
5	(Kuwait) Ahmad Al Khaldi	Fahaheel	19	5
6	(Kuwait) Khaled Al-Rashidi	Al-Qadsia	15	5

==== Hat-tricks ====
As of 11 May 2025

Player	Team	Result	Date	Goals
(Brazil) Vitor Vieira	Fahaheel	Fahaheel 4–0 Kazma	28 September 2024	3
(Brazil) Vitor Vieira	Fahaheel	Fahaheel 3–1 Al Naser	3 November 2024	3
(Brazil) Ulliam Barros Pereira	Fahaheel	Fahaheel 4–1 Al-Yarmouk	21 January 2025	3
(Libya) Mohammed Soulah	Qadsia	Qadsia 5–1 Al-Tadamun	20 April 2025	3
(Brazil) Vitor Vieira	Fahaheel	Fahaheel 7-4 Qadsia	11 May 2025	4

== Awards ==
=== Seasonal ===
- Player of the season: Mohammad Daham
- Young Player of the season: Jasem Al-Mutar
- Golden Glove: Sulaiman Abdulghafour
- Best Goalkeeper: Saud Al-Houshan
- Best Young Goalkeeper: Hussain Kankouni
- Kuwaiti Golden Boot: Yousef Nasser
- Playmaker: Ali Khalaf
- Best Manager: Nebojša Jovović

=== Round awards ===
As of 11 May 2025

Round	Player of the Round	
Round	Player	Club
1	(Kuwait) Ali Khalaf	Al Arabi
2	(Kuwait) Yousef Nasser	Al-Kuwait
3	(Kuwait) Abdelmohsen Al-Ajmi	Al-Fahaheel
4	(Kuwait) Talal Alansare	Al-Tadamon
5	(Kuwait) Yousef Nasser	Al-Kuwait
6	(Kuwait) Redha Abujabarah	Al-Kuwait
7	(Kuwait) Moath Al Asaima	Al-Salmiya
8	(Kuwait) Eid Al-Rashidi	Al-Qadsia
9	(Kuwait) Ali Khalaf	Al Arabi
10	(Kuwait) Eid Al-Rashidi	Al-Qadsia
11	(Kuwait) Abdulwahab Al-Awadi	Al Arabi
12	(Kuwait) Salman Al Awadhi	Al Arabi
13	(Kuwait) Ahmad Zanki	Kuwait
14	(Kuwait) Mohammad Daham	Kuwait
15	(Kuwait) Salman Bormeya	Al-Nasr
16	(Kuwait) Fawaz Al-Mubailish	Al-Nasr
17	(Kuwait) Mobarak Al-Faneeni	Qadsia
18	(Kuwait) Jasem Al-Mutar	Qadsia
19	(Kuwait) Fawaz Ayedh	Salmiya
20	(Kuwait) Rashed Al-Dousari	Qadsia
21	(Kuwait) Mohammad Frieh	Kuwait
22	(Kuwait) Sami Al-Sanea	Kuwait
23	(Kuwait) Mohammad Daham	Kuwait

== Attendances ==
The average league attendance was 388:

#	Club	Average
1	Al-Kuwait	912
2	Al-Arabi	854
3	Al-Qadsia	736
4	Kazma	321
5	Al-Salmiya	278
6	Al-Fahaheel	212
7	Al-Tadamon	187
8	Al-Nasar	143
9	Khaitan	128
10	Al-Yarmouk	105
