= 2013–14 Kuwait Crown Prince Cup =

Tournament details
- Country: Kuwait
- Teams: 14

Final positions
- Champions: Qadsia
- Runners-up: Al-Arabi

The 2013–14 Kuwait Crown Prince Cup was a cup competition involving teams from the Kuwaiti Premier League. The competition has continued to be played at the beginning of the season but the number of teams entering rounds one and two are fewer compared to the previous season.

== First round ==
3 September 2013	Khaitan SC	3–1 (a.e.t.)	Al Yarmouk
17:30	Alawi 88' (pen.), 120'; Al Khatlan 117'		Ali 14'

3 September 2013	Tadamon	1–2	Al Sahel
17:30	Kanu 90+3'		Jabber 5'; Saad 87'

== Second round ==
17 September 2013	Kazma	2–0	Al Sahel
17:10

17 September 2013	Al Shabab	0–1	Khaitan SC
17:10

== Third round ==
24 September 2013	Salmiya	1–1 (a.e.t.) (4 – 3 p)	Kazma
17:00

24 September 2013	Al Fahaheel	3–3 (a.e.t.) (5 – 4 p)	Khaitan SC
19:00
