= 2009 Kuwait Crown Prince Cup =

The Kuwaiti Crown Prince Cup is an end of season cup competition involving teams from the Kuwaiti Premier League and the Kuwaiti Division One league.

The 2009 edition is the 16th to be held.

In previous editions, the competition has been played over two legs, but it was altered to one leg for this year.

Al Kuwait Kaifan, the current holders of the cup, and last years finalists, Al Qadsia, receive a bye to the Second Round.

== First round ==
12 teams played a knockout tie. 6 clubs advanced to the next round. The games were played between 30 April and 2 May.

Tie no	Home team	Score	Away team
1	Al Naser	0 – 0	Al Salmiya
Al Naser won 4 - 2 on penalties
2	Kazma	1 - 1	Al Yarmouk
Kazma won 5 - 3 on penalties
3	Al Shabab	1 - 1	Sulaibikhat
Al Shabab won 5 - 4 on penalties
4	Al Jahra	3 - 2	Al Arabi
Jahra advanced after extra time
5	Sahel	2 - 1	Al Fahaheel
6	Khaitan	0 - 0	Tadamon
Tadamon won 4 - 1 on penalties

== Quarter-finals ==
8 teams play a knockout tie. 4 clubs advance to the next round. Games played between 10 & 11 May.

Tie no	Home team	Score	Away team
1	Al Kuwait Kaifan	1 - 0	Al Naser
2	Kazma	1 - 0	Al Shabab
3	Al Qadisiya Kuwait	3 - 1	Al Jahra
4	Sahel	1 - 0	Tadamon

== Semi-finals ==
4 teams play a knockout tie. 2 clubs advance to the final. Games played on 14 May.

Tie no	Home team	Score	Away team
1	Al Kuwait Kaifan	1 - 0	Kazma
2	Sahel	0 - 3	Al Qadisiya Kuwait

== Final ==
Final played on 1 June

Tie no	Home team	Score	Away team
1	Al Kuwait Kaifan	1 - 1	Al Qadisiya Kuwait
Al Qadisiya Kuwait won 5 - 3 on penalties
