= 2014–15 Kuwait Crown Prince Cup =

Tournament details
- Country: Kuwait
- Teams: 15

Final positions
- Champions: Al-Arabi
- Runners-up: Kuwait

Al-Arabi won this tournament winning its 57th official title

== Final ==
14 November 2014	Kuwait SC	2-4 (a.e.t.)	Al-Arabi SC (Kuwait)
17:27	Ahmad ibrahim own goal, makelele		Ahmad Hayel (2), Mohammad Jraq, Hussain Al-Musawi	Attendance: 19,000
