= 2011–12 Kuwait Crown Prince Cup =

Tournament details
- Teams: 14

Final positions
- Champions: Al Arabi
- Runners-up: Al Qadsia

Tournament statistics
- Matches played: 47
- Goals scored: 122 (2.6 per match)

The 2011–12 Kuwaiti Crown Prince Cup was a cup competition involving teams from the Kuwaiti Premier League and the Kuwaiti Division One league. The competition was brought forward to the beginning of the season and was changed from a single knockout competition to feature a group stage similar to the Kuwait Federation Cup.

The 2011–12 edition is the 19th edition to be held. Al Arabi were the champions.

== Group stage ==
=== Group 1 ===
Team	GP	W	D	L	GS	GA	GD	Pts
Al Qadsia	6	6	0	0	16	1	+15	18
Al Arabi	6	4	1	1	12	5	+7	13
Al Naser	6	3	0	3	8	10	−2	9
Kazma	6	2	2	2	9	8	+1	8
Al Jahra	6	2	1	3	5	7	−2	7
Khaitan	6	0	3	3	4	12	−8	3
Tadamon	6	0	1	5	2	13	−11	1

2011-08-19
Kazma	4–0	Al Naser
Khaitan	0–1	Al Arabi
Al Qadsia	3–0	Tadamon
2011-08-23
Kazma	1–4	Al Qadsia
Al Naser	0–2	Al Arabi
2011-08-24
Khaitan	0–0	Al Jahra
2011-09-10
Al Arabi	3–1	Al Jahra
Khaitan	2–2	Kazma
Tadamon	0–1	Al Naser
2011-09-16
Al Naser	0–2	Al Qadsia
Tadamon	1–1	Khaitan
Al Jahra	1–0	Kazma
2011-09-20
Kazma	1–1	Al Arabi
2011-09-24
Al Jahra	2–0	Tadamon
Al Qadsia	4–0	Khaitan
2011-09-30
Khaitan	1–4	Al Naser
Al Qadsia	1–0	Al Jahra
2011-10-02
Al Arabi	5–1	Tadamon
2011-10-25
Al Naser	3–1	Al Jahra
Al Arabi	0–2	Al Qadsia
Tadamon	0–1	Kazma

=== Group 2 ===
Team	GP	W	D	L	GS	GA	GD	Pts
Al Yarmouk	6	3	3	0	9	3	+6	12
Salmiya	6	3	2	1	7	5	+2	11
Al Shabab	6	3	2	1	9	5	+4	11
Al Kuwait	6	3	1	2	15	6	+9	10
Al Sahel	6	1	3	2	4	10	−6	6
Al Fahaheel	6	0	3	3	4	9	−5	3
Al Salibikhaet	6	0	2	4	7	15	−8	2

2011-08-19
Al Kuwait	4–1	Al Fahaheel
2011-08-20
Salmiya	2–2	Al Yarmouk
Al Sahel	2–0	Al Salibikhaet
2011-08-23
Salmiya	0–1	Al Kuwait
2011-08-24
Al Yarmouk	2–0	Al Salibikhaet
Al Shabab	0–0	Al Sahel
2011-09-09
Al Salibikhaet	1–2	Salmiya
Al Fahaheel	0–1	Al Shabab
Al Kuwait	5–0	Al Sahel
2011-09-17
Al Yarmouk	1–0	Al Kuwait
Al Shabab	1–2	Salmiya
Al Fahaheel	2–2	Al Sahel
2011-09-23
Al Salibikhaet	2–5	Al Shabab
Al Sahel	0–0	Salmiya
Al Fahaheel	0–0	Al Yarmouk
2011-09-30
Al Sahel	0–3	Al Yarmouk
2011-10-01
Al Salibikhaet	1–1	Al Fahaheel
2011-10-24
Al Shabab	1–1	Al Yarmouk
Al Salibikhaet	0–0	Al Kuwait
Al Fahaheel	0–1	Salmiya
2011-11-02
Al Kuwait	0–1	Al Shabab

== Semi-finals ==
=== 1st Legs ===
18 November 2011

Al Yarmouk	0 – 4	Al Arabi

18 November 2011

Al Qadsia	4 – 1	Salmiya

=== 2nd Legs ===
1 December 2011

Al Arabi	1 – 0	Al Yarmouk

1 December 2011

Al Qadsia	1 – 0	Salmiya

== Final ==
27 December 2011

Al Qadsia	0 – 0	Al Arabi
Penalties
	1–4
