= Kuwait SC =

Kuwaiti sports club

- Full name: Kuwait Sports Club
- Nickname: The Brigadiers (العميد)
- Founded: 20 October 1960; 66 years ago
- Ground: Al Kuwait Sports Club Stadium; Jaber Al-Mubarak Al-Hamad Stadium (selected matches); Jaber Al-Ahmad International Stadium (selected matches)
- Capacity: 12,350; 15,000; 60,000
- Chairman: Khalid Al-Ghanim
- Manager: Firas Al Khatib
- League: Kuwait Premier League
- 2025–26: Kuwait Premier League, 1st of 10 (champions)
Home colours	Away colours

Kuwait SC active departments
Football (men's)	Handball (men's)	Basketball (men's)

Kuwait Sports Club, also known as Al-Kuwait, (Arabic: نادي الكويت الرياضي) is a Kuwaiti professional football club based in Kuwait City. They have won the Kuwait Premier League 19 times and over 50 trophies overall. The club plays at the Al Kuwait Sports Club Stadium located in Kaifan. It is the first Kuwaiti club to win an Asian title, having won the 2009 AFC Cup, 2012 AFC Cup, 2013 AFC Cup, and the 2025–26 AFC Challenge League.

== History ==
The club is also called Al Kuwait and Al Ameed. Members of the club during the 1980s formed a part of the Kuwaiti national team which reached the 1982 FIFA World Cup. The second golden age for the club was in the 2000s, as they have been winning most of the league titles and participating in AFC Cup. In 2009, Kuwait won the first AFC Cup winning against Al-Karamah from Syria with the victory of 2–1. In 2011, they reached the AFC Cup final, but they lost against Nasaf Qarshi from Uzbekistan. The club became champion of AFC Cup in 2012 and 2013 defeating Erbil SC from Iraq with 4-0 and fellow side Al-Qadsia.

Kuwait SC has been growing steadily over the last two decades from 2000 to 2020, over the two decades the team has won many domestic titles and Asian titles in the form of AFC CUP. Kuwait SC has been also among the teams to represent Kuwait in international tournaments including the Arab Champions Cup.

Kuwait SC is a team based in Kuwait City. There are two other teams in the capital of Kuwait: Al Arabi SC, and Kazma SC, who are naturally the team's rivals. The 2000s were a new era of dominance for Kuwait SC alongside Qadsia, which is based in Hawalli. The dominance of both sides for almost 10 years winning all local tournaments between them has created an important rivalry between both teams.

== Honours ==
Type	Competition	Title holder	Seasons	Runners-up	Seasons
Domestic	Kuwait Premier League	21	1964–65, 1967–68, 1971–72, 1973–74, 1976–77, 1978–79, 2000-01, 2005–06, 2006–07, 2007–08, 2012–13, 2014–15, 2016–17, 2017–18, 2018–19, 2019–20, 2021–22, 2022–23, 2023–24, 2024–25, 2025–26	11	1969–70, 1974–75, 1975–76, 1984–85, 1987–88, 2004-05, 2009–10, 2010–11, 2011–12, 2013–14
Domestic	Kuwait Emir Cup	17^{S}	1976, 1977, 1978, 1980, 1985, 1987, 1988, 2002, 2009, 2013–14, 2015–16, 2016–17, 2017–18, 2018–19, 2020–21, 2022–23, 2024–25	10	1963, 1969, 1971, 1975, 1981, 1982, 2004, 2010, 2011, 2020
Domestic	Kuwait Crown Prince Cup	10	1993-1994, 2002-2003, 2008, 2010, 2011, 2016–17, 2018–19, 2019–20, 2020–21, 2024–25	10	2002, 2004, 2005, 2006, 2009, 2014–15, 2015–16, 2017–18, 2021–22 , 2025–26
Domestic	Kuwait Super Cup	8	2010, 2015, 2016, 2017, 2020, 2022, 2023–24, 2024–25	8	2008, 2009, 2013, 2014, 2018, 2019, 2021, 2025–26
Domestic	Kuwait Federation Cup	5	1977–78, 1991–92, 2009–10, 2011–12, 2014–15	2	2008, 2015–16
Domestic	Al Kurafi Cup (defunct)	1	2005	0	
Domestic	Kuwait Joint League (defunct)	2	1976–77, 1988–89	0	
Asia	AFC Cup / AFC Champions League Two	3^{S}	2009, 2012, 2013	1	2011
Asia	AFC Challenge League	1	2025–26	0	

- record
- ^{S} shared record

== Statistics in Asian football ==
Season	Competition	Round	Club	Home	Away	Aggregate
2001–02	Asian Club Championship	First round	(Syria) Jableh	2–0	0–0	2–0
2001–02	Asian Club Championship	Second round	(Palestine) Al-Quds Club	3–2	6–1	9–3
2001–02	Asian Club Championship	Group stage	(Uzbekistan) Nasaf	1–1		3rd out of 4
2001–02	Asian Club Championship	Group stage	(United Arab Emirates) Al-Wahda	2–2		3rd out of 4
2001–02	Asian Club Championship	Group stage	(Iran) Esteghlal	0–3		3rd out of 4
2002–03	AFC Champions League	Second round	(United Arab Emirates) Al-Ahli	3–1	0–2	3–3 (a)
2005	AFC Champions League	Group stage	(Uzbekistan) Neftchi	1–0	0–1	3rd out of 4
2005	AFC Champions League	Group stage	(Qatar) Al-Sadd	0–1	0–2	3rd out of 4
2005	AFC Champions League	Group stage	(United Arab Emirates) Al-Ahli	1–0	3–3	3rd out of 4
2007	AFC Champions League	Group stage	(Saudi Arabia) Al-Hilal	0–0	1–1	3rd out of 3
2007	AFC Champions League	Group stage	(Uzbekistan) Pakhtakor	0–1	1–2	3rd out of 3
2008	AFC Champions League	Group stage	(Iran) Saipa	1–1	0–1	4th out of 4
2008	AFC Champions League	Group stage	(Iraq) Al-Quwa Al-Jawiya	1–2	0–0	4th out of 4
2008	AFC Champions League	Group stage	(United Arab Emirates) Al-Wasl	2–1	0–1	4th out of 4
2009	AFC Cup	Group stage	(Jordan) Al-Wahdat	1–0	1–1	1st out of 4
2009	AFC Cup	Group stage	(Syria) Al-Karamah	2–1	1–2	1st out of 4
2009	AFC Cup	Group stage	(India) Mohun Bagan	6–0	1–0	1st out of 4
2009	AFC Cup	Round of 16	(India) Dempo	3–1		
2009	AFC Cup	Quarter-final	(Iraq) Arbil	1–1	1–0	2–1
2009	AFC Cup	Semi-final	(Hong Kong) South China	2–1	1–0	3–1
2009	AFC Cup	Final	(Syria) Al-Karamah	2–1		
2010	AFC Cup	Group stage	(Yemen) Al Hilal	2–2	2–0	1st out of 3
2010	AFC Cup	Group stage	(India) Churchill Brothers	7–1	2–2	1st out of 3
2010	AFC Cup	Round of 16	(Syria) Al-Ittihad	1–1 (a.e.t.) (4–5 p)		
2011	AFC Cup	Group stage	(Jordan) Al-Wahdat	1–3	0–1	2nd out of 4
2011	AFC Cup	Group stage	(Oman) Al-Suwaiq	0–0	3–1	2nd out of 4
2011	AFC Cup	Group stage	(Iraq) Al Talaba	1–0	2–1	2nd out of 4
2011	AFC Cup	Round of 16	(Kuwait) Qadsia	2–2 (a.e.t.) (3–2 p)		
2011	AFC Cup	Quarter-final	(Thailand) Muangthong United	1–0	0–0	1–0
2011	AFC Cup	Semi-final	(Iraq) Arbil	3–3	2–0	5–3
2011	AFC Cup	Final	(Uzbekistan) Nasaf	1–2		
2012	AFC Cup	Group stage	(Saudi Arabia) Al-Ettifaq	1–5	2–2	2nd out of 4
2012	AFC Cup	Group stage	(Maldives) VB Sports Club	7–1	2–2	2nd out of 4
2012	AFC Cup	Group stage	(Lebanon) Al Ahed	1–0	4–0	2nd out of 4
2012	AFC Cup	Round of 16	(Kuwait) Qadsia	1–1 (a.e.t.) (3–1 p)		
2012	AFC Cup	Quarter-final	(Jordan) Al-Wehdat	0–0	3–0	3–0
2012	AFC Cup	Semi-final	(Saudi Arabia) Al-Ettifaq	4–1	2–0	6–1
2012	AFC Cup	Final	(Iraq) Arbil	4–0		
2013	AFC Cup	Group stage	(Tajikistan) Regar-TadAZ	5–0	3–1	1st out of 4
2013	AFC Cup	Group stage	(Lebanon) Al-Safa	3–1	0–1	1st out of 4
2013	AFC Cup	Group stage	(Bahrain) Riffa SC	2–3	2–0	1st out of 4
2013	AFC Cup	Round of 16	(Iraq) Dohuk	1–1 (a.e.t.) (4–1 p)		
2013	AFC Cup	Quarter-final	(Maldives) New Radiant	5–0	7–2	12–2
2013	AFC Cup	Semi-final	(India) East Bengal	4–2	3–0	7–2
2013	AFC Cup	Final	(Kuwait) Al-Qadsia	2–0		
2014	AFC Champions League	Qualifying play-off round one	(Iraq) Al-Shorta	1–0		
2014	AFC Champions League	Qualifying play-off round two	(Uzbekistan) Lokomotiv Tashkent	3–1		
2014	AFC Champions League	Qualifying play-off round three	(Qatar) Lekhwiya SC	1–4		
2014	AFC Cup	Group stage	(Lebanon) Nejmeh SC	2–1	0–0	1st out of 4
2014	AFC Cup	Group stage	(Oman) Fanja	4–0	1–3	1st out of 4
2014	AFC Cup	Group stage	(Syria) Al-Jaish	2–0	2–0	1st out of 4
2014	AFC Cup	Round of 16	(Bahrain) Al Riffa	2–0		
2014	AFC Cup	Quarter-final	(Indonesia) Persipura Jayapura	3–2	1–6	4–8
2015	AFC Cup	Group stage	(Lebanon) Nejmeh SC	4–1	2–1	2nd out of 4
2015	AFC Cup	Group stage	(Bahrain) Riffa S.C.	2–1	1–2	2nd out of 4
2015	AFC Cup	Group stage	(Syria) Al-Jaish	0–1	0–0	2nd out of 4
2015	AFC Cup	Round of 16	(Iraq) Al Shorta SC	2–0		
2015	AFC Cup	Quarter-final	(Hong Kong) Kitchee SC	6–0	1–1	7–1
2015	AFC Cup	Semi-final	(Tajikistan) FC Istiklol	~~4–0~~	—N/a	w/o (Note: On 16 October 2015, the Kuwait Football Association was suspended by FIFA. As a result, Al-Kuwait was disqualified from the AFC Cup.)
2019	AFC Champions League	Preliminary round 1	(Jordan) Al-Wehdat SC	3–2		
2019	AFC Champions League	Preliminary round 2	(Iran) Zob Ahan SC	0–1		
2019	AFC Cup	Group stage	(Jordan) Al-Jazeera Club	1–2	0–1	2nd out of 4
2019	AFC Cup	Group stage	(Bahrain) Al-Najma	2–1	1–0	2nd out of 4
2019	AFC Cup	Group stage	(Syria) Al-Ittihad	0–0	2–0	2nd out of 4
2020	AFC Champions League	Preliminary round 1	(Jordan) Al-Faisaly	2–1		
2020	AFC Champions League	Preliminary round 2	(Iran) Esteghlal	0–3		
2020	AFC Cup	Group stage	(Lebanon) Al-Ansar	1–0	—N/a	Cancelled (Note: Due to the COVID-19 pandemic in Asia, the 2020 AFC Cup was cancelled by the AFC.)
2020	AFC Cup	Group stage	(Syria) Al-Wathba	—N/a	0–0	Cancelled
2020	AFC Cup	Group stage	(Jordan) Al-Faisaly	—N/a	—N/a	Cancelled
2021	AFC Cup	Group stage	(Palestine) Markaz Shabab	4–1		1st out of 4
2021	AFC Cup	Group stage	(Syria) Tishreen SC	3–3		1st out of 4
2021	AFC Cup	Group stage	(Jordan) Al-Faisaly	1–0		1st out of 4
2021	AFC Cup	Quarter-final	(Jordan) Al-Salt SC	2–0		
2021	AFC Cup	West Asia Zone final	(Bahrain) Al-Muharraq SC	0–2		
2022	AFC Cup	Group stage	(Lebanon) Al-Ansar	1–1		2nd out of 4
2022	AFC Cup	Group stage	(Oman) Al-Seeb	2–1		2nd out of 4
2022	AFC Cup	Group stage	(Syria) Jableh	0–0		2nd out of 4
2023–24	AFC Cup	Group stage	(Iraq) Al-Kahrabaa	0–1	0–0	3rd out of 4
2023–24	AFC Cup	Group stage	(Jordan) Al-Wehdat	2–1	1–1	3rd out of 4
2023–24	AFC Cup	Group stage	(Syria) Al Ittihad	1–1	1–1	3rd out of 4
2024–25	AFC Champions League Two	Group stage	(Uzbekistan) Nasaf	0–0	2–1	3rd out of 4
2024–25	AFC Champions League Two	Group stage	(Jordan) Al-Hussein	2–2	1–2	3rd out of 4
2024–25	AFC Champions League Two	Group stage	(United Arab Emirates) Shabab Al Ahli	3–3	1–4	3rd out of 4
2025–26	AFC Challenge League	Group stage	(Lebanon) Al-Ansar	3–2		1st out of 4
2025–26	AFC Challenge League	Group stage	(Oman) Al-Seeb	1–1		1st out of 4
2025–26	AFC Challenge League	Group stage	(Bangladesh) Bashundra	2–0		1st out of 4
2025–26	AFC Challenge League	Quarter-final	(Oman) Al-Shabab	5–3		
2025–26	AFC Challenge League	Semi-final	(Kyrgyzstan) Muras United	2–1		
2025–26	AFC Challenge League	Final	(Cambodia) PKR Svay Rieng	4–3 (a.e.t.)		
2026–27	AFC Champions League Two	Group stage	(United Arab Emirates) Al Wahda		2–3	
2026–27	AFC Champions League Two	Group stage	(Bahrain) Al-Khaldiya	3–1		
2026–27	AFC Champions League Two	Group stage	(Uzbekistan) Nasaf	2–3	1–0	

== Players ==
=== First team squad ===
As of 31 August 2026

Note: Flags indicate national team as defined under FIFA eligibility rules; some limited exceptions apply. Players may hold more than one non-FIFA nationality.

No.	Pos.	Nation	Player
1	GK	KUW	Khaled Al-Rashidi
2	DF	KUW	Sami Al-Sanea
3	DF	KUW	Meshari Al-Enezi
4	MF	KUW	Redha Abujabarah
6	DF	KUW	Yousif Al-Khebizi
7	FW	KUW	Ebrahim Kameel
8	MF	KUW	Ahmed Al-Dhefiri
9	MF	KUW	Faisal Zayid
10	MF	EGY	Amr Abdelfattah
11	MF	KUW	Mohammad Daham
12	DF	KUW	Mohsen Al-Ghareeb
20	FW	KUW	Yousef Nasser

No.	Pos.	Nation	Player
21	DF	IRI	Ali Pourdara
23	DF	KUW	Mohammad Frieh
26	FW	BHR	Mohamed Marhoon
27	FW	TUN	Taha Yassine Khenissi
33	GK	KUW	Saud Al Hoshan
35	DF	COD	Arsène Zola
39	FW	KUW	Salman Al-Awadhi
40	GK	KUW	Abdulrahman Kameel
44	DF	KUW	Hassan Al-Enezi
66	MF	MAR	El Mehdi Barrahma
72	MF	KUW	Humoud Al-Sanousi
-	DF	CMR	Oumar Gonzalez

== List of presidents ==
Years	President
1961–63	Mohamed Al Khaled Al Zayed
1963–65	Fahad Al Marzoq
1965–72	Khidair Al Mashaan
1972–74	Mubarak Al Asfoor
1974–81	Khidair Al Mashaan
1981–92	Ali Thunyan Al Ghanim
1992–94	Ghassan Al Nesf
1994–00	Mohammed Al-Sager
2000–02	Jassim Al Mahri
2002	Issam Al Sager
2002	Youssuf Al Munais
2002–08	Marzouq Al-Ghanim
2008–18	Abdulaziz Al Marzouq
2018–	Khalid Al-Ghanim

== List of managers/coaches ==
Years	Name
1978–82	(Kuwait) Saleh Zakaria
1982–84	(England) Geoff Hurst
1987–89	(England) Allan Jones
1995–96	(England) John Cartwright
1996	(Ukraine) Oleh Bazylevych
1996–97	(Socialist Federal Republic of Yugoslavia) Slobodan Pavković
2001–02	(Germany) Rainer Bonhof
2002–03	(Slovakia) Ján Pivarník
2003	(Kuwait) Saleh Zakaria
2003–04	(Brazil) Giba
2004	(Kuwait) Saleh Zakaria
2004–05	(Kuwait) Mohamed Abdullah
2005	(Germany) Theo Bücker
2005–06	(Croatia) Rodion Gačanin
2006	(Kuwait) Mohamed Abdullah
2006–07	(Netherlands) Willem Leushuis
2007	(Kuwait) Mohamed Abdullah
2007–08	(Croatia) Rodion Gačanin
2008	(Serbia) Radmilo Ivančević
2008–09	(France) Laurent Banide
2009	(Argentina) Néstor Clausen
2009–10	(Kuwait) Mohamed Abdullah

Years	Name
2010	(Brazil) Arthur Bernardes
2010	(Kuwait) Mohamed Abdullah
2010–11	(Portugal) José Romão
2011–12	(Croatia) Dragan Talajić
2012–14	(Romania) Marin Ion
2014	(Kuwait) Aziz Hamada
2014–2016	(Kuwait) Mohammed Ebrahim Hajeyah
2016–2017	(France) Laurent Banide
2017–2018	(Jordan) Abdullah Abu Zema
2018	(Kuwait) Mohamed Abdullah
2019	(Syria) Hussam Al Sayed
2020	(Netherlands) Ruud Krol
2020–21	(Kuwait) Mohamed Abdullah
2021	(Spain) Carlos González Juárez
2021	(Tunisia) Fathi Al-Jabal
2021–22	(Tunisia) Nabil Maâloul
2022	(Croatia) Rodion Gačanin
2022–23	(Bahrain) Ali Ashoor
2023	(Serbia) Boris Bunjak
2023–24	(Tunisia) Nabil Maâloul
2024–	(Montenegro) Nebojša Jovović

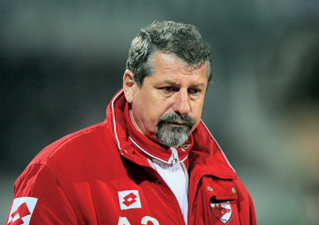
Marin Ion, manager of the club from 2012 to 2014, won the Kuwaiti Premier League and the AFC Cup twice in 2012 and 2013

== Other sports ==
Besides football, the club has teams for handball, basketball, volleyball, water polo, squash, athletics, gymnastics, swimming, boxing, judo, and weightlifting. The club has also maintained a monthly magazine since 2007.

== See also ==
- List of football clubs in Kuwait
