= Kuwait Crown Prince Cup =

- Founded: 1994; 32 years ago
- Country: Kuwait
- Number of clubs: 18
- Current champions: Al-Arabi (10th title)
- Most championships: Kuwait; Al-Arabi (10 titles)
- Current: 2026–27 Kuwait Crown Prince Cup

The Crown Prince Cup (Arabic: كأس ولي العهد) is a Kuwaiti annual football competition created in 1994.

== Previous winners ==
- 1994: Kuwait
- 1995: Kazma
- 1996: Al-Arabi
- 1997: Al-Arabi
- 1998: Qadsia
- 1999: Al-Arabi
- 2000: Al-Arabi
- 2001: Al-Salmiya
- 2002: Qadsia
- 2003: Kuwait
- 2004: Qadsia
- 2005: Qadsia
- 2006: Qadsia
- 2007: Al-Arabi
- 2008: Kuwait
- 2009:Qadsia
- 2010: Kuwait
- 2011: Kuwait
- 2012:Al-Arabi
- 2013: Qadsia
- 2014: Qadsia
- 2014–15: Al-Arabi
- 2015–16: Al-Salmiya
- 2016–17: Kuwait
- 2017–18: Qadsia
- 2018–19: Kuwait
- 2019–20: Kuwait
- 2020–21: Kuwait
- 2021–22: Al-Arabi
- 2022–23: Al-Arabi
- 2023–24: Abandoned
- 2024–25: Kuwait
- 2025–26: Al-Arabi
- 2026–27: TBD

== Performance by club ==
Club	Winners
Kuwait	10
Al-Arabi	10
Qadsia	9
Al-Salmiya	2
Kazma	1

== See also ==
- Kuwait Premier League
- Kuwait Division One
- Kuwait Emir Cup
- Kuwait Super Cup
