= Kuwait Super Cup =

- Founded: 2008
- Region: Kuwait
- Teams: 2 (until 2022); 4 (2023–present)
- Current champions: Qadsia (7th title)
- Most championships: Kuwait (8 titles)
- 2026–27 Kuwait Super Cup

The Kuwait Super Cup (Arabic: كأس السوبر الكويتي) is football competition in Kuwait organised by the Kuwait Football Association (KFA) since 2008. Until the 2022–23 season, the competition served as the opening match of the season and was played between the champions of the Kuwait Premier League and the Kuwait Emir Cup of the previous season. The current version has been contested since 2023–24 by four teams: the champions and runners-up of the Premier League and the Emir Cup and the Kuwait Crown Prince Cup. If the name of one of the teams is repeated, the third-placed team in the league will participate, followed by the fourth-placed team.

== Results ==
=== Two-team format ===
Year	Premier League champion	Result	Emir Cup winner	Stadium
2008	Kuwait	0–1	Al-Arabi	Mohammed Al-Hamad Stadium, Hawally, Kuwait
2009	Qadsia	4–1	Kuwait	Mohammed Al-Hamad Stadium, Hawally, Kuwait
2010	Qadsia	1–3	Kuwait	Al Kuwait Sports Club Stadium, Kaifan
2011	Qadsia	1–0	Kazma	(Kuwait) Sabah Al-Salem Stadium, Mansūriya
2012	Qadsia^{*}	1–2	Al-Arabi^{#}	Al Kuwait Sports Club Stadium, Kaifan
2013	Kuwait	1–3	Qadsia	(Kuwait) Ali Sabah Al-Salem Stadium, Al Farwaniyah
2014	Qadsia	3–2	Kuwait	(Kuwait) Ali Sabah Al-Salem Stadium, Al Farwaniyah
2015	Kuwait	3–1	Qadsia	(Kuwait) Ali Sabah Al-Salem Stadium, Al Farwaniyah
2016	Qadsia	2–2 (2–3 p)	Kuwait	(Kuwait) Jaber Al-Ahmad International Stadium, Al Farwaniyah
2017	Kuwait^	0–0 (5–4 p)	Qadsia~	(Kuwait) Jaber Al-Ahmad International Stadium, Al Farwaniyah
2018	Kuwait*	1–2	Qadsia	(Kuwait) Sabah Al-Salem Stadium, Mansūriya
2019	Kuwait*	0–1	Qadsia	(Kuwait) Jaber Al-Ahmad International Stadium, Al Farwaniyah
2020	Kuwait	1–0	Al-Arabi	(Kuwait) Jaber Al-Ahmad International Stadium, Al Farwaniyah
2021	Al-Arabi	1–1 (4–3 p)	Kuwait	(Kuwait) Jaber Al-Ahmad International Stadium, Al Farwaniyah
2022	Kuwait	2–1	Kazma	(Kuwait) Jaber Al-Ahmad International Stadium, Al Farwaniyah

Notes

- ^ Premier League, Kuwait Emir Cup and Kuwait Crown Prince Cup winners.
- * Premier League and Kuwait Emir Cup winners.
- # Kuwait Crown Prince Cup winners.
- ~ Premier League Runners-up.

=== Four-team format ===
Year	Winners	Score	Runners-up	Semi-finalists	Stadium
2023–24	Kuwait	2–1	Kazma	Al-Arabi	(Kuwait) Jaber Al-Ahmad International Stadium, Al Farwaniyah
2023–24	Kuwait	2–1	Kazma	Qadsia	(Kuwait) Jaber Al-Ahmad International Stadium, Al Farwaniyah
2024–25	Kuwait	1–1 (7–6 pen)	Qadsia	Al-Arabi	(Kuwait) Jaber Al-Ahmad International Stadium, Al Farwaniyah
2024–25	Kuwait	1–1 (7–6 pen)	Qadsia	Al-Salmiya	(Kuwait) Jaber Al-Ahmad International Stadium, Al Farwaniyah
2025–26	Qadsia	1–1 (4–3 pen)	Kuwait	Al-Arabi	(Kuwait) Jaber Al-Ahmad International Stadium, Al Farwaniyah
2025–26	Qadsia	1–1 (4–3 pen)	Kuwait	Al-Salmiya	(Kuwait) Jaber Al-Ahmad International Stadium, Al Farwaniyah
2026–27					

== Performances ==
=== Performances by club ===
Club	Titles	Winners	Runners-up
Kuwait	8	2010, 2015, 2016, 2017, 2020, 2022, 2023–24, 2024–25	2008, 2009, 2013, 2014, 2018, 2019, 2025–26
Qadsia	7	2009, 2011, 2013, 2014, 2018, 2019, 2025–26	2010, 2012, 2015, 2016, 2017, 2024–25
Al-Arabi	3	2008, 2012, 2021	2020
Kazma	0	–	2011, 2022, 2023–24

== See also ==
- Kuwait Premier League
- Kuwait Division One
- Kuwait Emir Cup
- Kuwait Crown Prince Cup
