= 2026–27 Al-Arabi SC season =

Al-Arabi
2026–27 season
- President: Abdulaziz Ashour
- Head coach: Goran Sablić
- Stadium: Sabah Al Salem Stadium; Sulaibikhat Stadium (selected matches)
- Premier League: TBD
- Kuwait Emir Cup: TBD
- AFC Champions League 2: Preliminary Round
- Kuwait Super Cup: TBD
- 25/26 Kuwait Emir Cup: TBD
- AFC Challenge League: TBD

The 2026–27 is Al-Arabi's 65th consecutive season in the top flight of Kuwait football. The club participates in the Premier League, the Kuwait Emir Cup, the AFC Champions League Two, AFC Challenge League , the Super Cup and Kuwait Crown Prince Cup.

The season covers the period from 1 July 2026 to 30 June 2027.

== Players ==
=== First-team squad ===
As of 31 July 2026

== Transfers and loans ==
=== Transfers in ===
Entry date	Position	No.	Player	From club	Fee	Ref.
3 July 2026	GK	35	(Kuwait) Abdulrahman Ajaj	(Kuwait) Al-Tadamon	Free	
3 July 2026	GK	26	(Kuwait) Ahmad A'adi	(Kuwait) Al-Fahaheel	Free	
6 July 2026	FW	9	(Kuwait) Ali Al Doukhi	(Kuwait) Al-Fahaheel	Free	
6 July 2026	FW	11	(Kuwait) Talal Al-Qaisi	(Kuwait) Kazma	Free	
11 July 2026	FW	9	(Ethiopia) Kenean Markneh	(Oman) Al-Shabab	Free	
15 July 2026	FW	27	(Brazil) Lucas Shallon	(Kuwait) Sulaibikhat	Free	
18 July 2026	DF	29	(Senegal) Khadim Rassoul	(Iraq) Duhok	Free	

Expenditure: ▲$0

=== Transfers out ===
Exit date	Position	No.	Player	To club	Fee	Ref.
2 July 2026	FW	15	(Kuwait) Abdulrahman Karam	(Kuwait) Al-Yarmouk	End of Contract	
3 July 2026	GK	1	(Kuwait) Ahmed Dashti	(Kuwait) Al-Fahaheel	End of Contract	
4 July 2026	GK	39	(Kuwait) Abdulreda Shehab	(Kuwait) Burgan	Released	
4 July 2026	GK	35	(Kuwait) Abdullah Al-Ayoub	(Kuwait) Al-Salmiya	Released	
9 July 2026	FW	39	(Kuwait) Salman Al-Awadhi	Kuwait	undisclosed	
10 July 2026	MF	88	(Kuwait) Abdullah Al-Garzaie	Kuwait	undisclosed	
11 July 2026	DF	23	(Kuwait) Nasser Saeed	(Kuwait) Khaitan	Released	
11 July 2026	MF	19	(Bahrain) Kamil Al-Aswad	(Bahrain) Al-Riffa	Released	
15 July 2026	MF	32	(Kuwait) Ahmed Awadh	(Kuwait) Al-Salmiya	Released	
18 July 2026	DF	27	(Morocco) Nabil Marmouk	(Morocco) AS FAR	End of Contract	

=== Loans out ===
Start date	End date	Position	No.	Player	To club	Fee	Ref.
14 August 2026	31 July 2027	DF	41	(Kuwait) Abdullah Essa	(Kuwait) Al-Jazeera	None	

== Pre-season and friendlies ==
Win Draw Loss Fixtures

23 July 2026 Friendly	Al-Arabi (Kuwait Football Association)	1–3	(Turkish Football Federation) Erzurumspor	Erzurum, Turkey
17:30 AST	Jumma Abboud 38'			Stadium: Kazım Karabekir Stadium

27 July 2026 Friendly	Al-Arabi (Kuwait Football Association)	1–1	(Turkish Football Federation) Vanspor	Erzurum, Turkey
17:30 AST	Zaid Qunbar 62'			Stadium: Kazım Karabekir Stadium

27 July 2026 Friendly	Al-Arabi (Kuwait Football Association)	4–0	(Turkish Football Federation) Amed	Diyarbakır, Turkey
17:30 AST	Qunbar 20' 22'; Al-Qaisi 64'; Shallon 82'			Stadium: Diyarbakır Stadium

4 August 2026 Friendly	Al-Arabi (Kuwait Football Association)	1–3	(Egyptian Football Association) Pyramids	Diyarbakır, Turkey
17:30 AST	Kenean Markneh 35'			Stadium: Diyarbakır Stadium

== Competitions ==
=== Overview ===
Competition	Record							
Competition	Pld	W	D	L	GF	GA	GD	Win %
Premier League	6	2	3	1	13	9	+4	33.33
Emir Cup	0	0	0	0	0	0	+0	—
Emir Cup (25/26)	0	0	0	0	0	0	+0	—
AFC Champions League 2	1	0	0	1	1	4	−3	0.00
AFC Challenge League	3	0	0	3	1	6	−5	0.00
Super Cup	0	0	0	0	0	0	+0	—
Crown Prince Cup	0	0	0	0	0	0	+0	—
Total	10	2	3	5	15	20	−5	20.00

Source: Competitions

=== Premier League ===
==== Results by round ====
Round	1	2	3	4	5	6	7	8	9	10	11	12	13	14	15	16	17	18	19	20	21	22
Ground	A	A	H	A																		
Result	D	L	D	D																		
Position	6	9	10	10																		

First match(es) will be played on 17 August 2025. Source:
A = Away; H = Home; W = Win; D = Draw; L = Loss

==== Matches ====
25 August 2026 1	Al-Kuwait	3-3	Al-Arabi	Ardiya, Farwaniya
AST 21:00			Khalaf 22'; Qunbar 53' 87' (pen.)	Stadium: Ali Sabah Al-Salem Stadium

30 August 2026 2	Al-Jahra	2-1	Al-Arabi	Salmiya, Hawalli
AST 21:00			Qunbar 29'	Stadium: Thamir Stadium

5 September 2026 3	Al-Arabi	3-3	Al-Sulaibikhat	Mansuriyah, Kuwait City
AST 19:00	Markneh 19'; Al Salamah 45+2'; Al-Awadi 90+10'			Stadium: Sabah Al Salem Stadium

9 September 2026 4	Kazma	1-1	Al-Arabi	Mansuriyah, Kuwait City
AST 19:00			Ali Al-Doukhi 85'	Stadium: Sabah Al Salem Stadium

=== Emir Cup ===
==== 2025-26 ====
28 February 2026 Quarter-Final	Al-Arabi	v	Khaitan
AST 20:40

=== AFC Champions League Two ===
==== Preliminary stage ====
12 August 2026 West Q1	East Bengal (India)	4-1 (a.e.t.)	(Kuwait) Al-Arabi	Kolkata
13:00 AST			Anayo Iwuala 76' (pen.)	Stadium: Salt Lake Stadium; Attendance: 32,256; Referee: (Tajikistan) Sadullo Gulmurodi

== Statistics ==
=== Appearances ===
Last updated on 7 November 2026.

No.	Pos	Nat	Player	Total		Premier League		Emir Cup		ACL2		ACL		Super Cup		Crown Prince Cup	
No.	Pos	Nat	Player	Apps	Goals	Apps	Goals	Apps	Goals	Apps	Goals	Apps	Goals	Apps	Goals	Apps	Goals
Goalkeepers
22	GK	(Kuwait) KUW	Sulaiman Abdulghafour	4	0	2	0	0	0	1	0	1	0	0	0	0	0
27	GK	(Kuwait) KUW	Abdulrahman Ajaj	4	0	3	0	0	0	0	0	1	0	0	0	0	0
35	GK	(Kuwait) KUW	Ahmad A'adi	4	0	3	0	0	0	0	0	1	0	0	0	0	0
1	GK	(Kuwait) KUW	Hussain Kankouni	0	0	0	0	0	0	0	0	0	0	0	0	0	0
Defenders
28	DF	(Brazil) BRA	Leonardo Sheldon	4	0	3	0	0	0	1	0	0	0	0	0	0	0
29	DF	(Senegal) SEN	Khadim Rassoul	4	0	3	0	0	0	1	0	0	0	0	0	0	0
29	DF	(Algeria) ALG	Badreddine Souyad	7	0	4	0	0	0	0	0	3	0	0	0	0	0
5	DF	(Syria) SYR	Jumma Abboud	9	0	5	0	0	0	0+1	0	2+1	0	0	0	0	0
3	DF	(Kuwait) KUW	Abdullah Ammar	6	0	2+2	0	0	0	1	0	1	0	0	0	0	0
4	DF	(Kuwait) KUW	Mohammed Khaled	3	0	0+3	0	0	0	0	0	0	0	0	0	0	0
12	DF	(Kuwait) KUW	Hamad Al-Harbi	7	0	3+1	0	0	0	0+1	0	1+1	0	0	0	0	0
15	DF	(Kuwait) KUW	Hamad Al-Qallaf	0	0	0	0	0	0	0	0	0	0	0	0	0	0
41	DF	(Kuwait) KUW	Abdullah Essa	0	0	0	0	0	0	0	0	0	0	0	0	0	0
16	DF	(Kuwait) KUW	Ali Abdul Rasul	2	0	0	0	0	0	0+1	0	1	0	0	0	0	0
2	DF	(Kuwait) KUW	Abdulwahab Al-Awadi	11	1	6+1	1	0	0	1	0	2+1	0	0	0	0	0
21	DF	(Iran) IRI	Abdulaziz Nasari	5	3	5	0	0	0	0	0	0	2+1	0	0	0	0
24	DF	(Kuwait) KUW	Jassem Shammouh	0	0	0	0	0	0	0	0	0	0	0	0	0	0
Midfielders
7	MF	(Kuwait) KUW	Bader Al-Fadhel	4	0	0+3	0	0	0	0+1	0	0	0	0	0	0	0
8	MF	(Kuwait) KUW	Hussain Ashkanani	0	0	0	0	0	0	0	0	0	0	0	0	0	0
10	MF	(Kuwait) KUW	Bandar Al Salamah	10	2	1+5	2	0	0	0+1	0	1+2	0	0	0	0	0
12	MF	(Kuwait) KUW	Bader Al-Mutairi	0	0	0	0	0	0	0	0	0	0	0	0	0	0
40	MF	(Kuwait) KUW	Saud Al-Anbari	0	0	0	0	0	0	0	0	0	0	0	0	0	0
14	MF	(Kuwait) KUW	Khaled Al-Mershed	5	0	3	0	0	0	1	0	1	0	0	0	0	0
17	MF	(Kuwait) KUW	Ali Khalaf	8	2	4+2	2	0	0	0	0	1+1	0	0	0	0	0
20	MF	(Kuwait) KUW	Nayef Al-Shemmari	0	0	0	0	0	0	0	0	0	0	0	0	0	0
6	MF	(Iran) IRI	Ali Porusaniei	7	0	4	0	0	0	1	0	2	0	0	0	0	0
30	MF	(Kuwait) KUW	Yousef Majed	10	1	6+1	1	0	0	1	0	1+1	0	0	0	0	0
28	MF	(Kuwait) KUW	Omar Al-Azmi	0	0	0	0	0	0	0	0	0	0	0	0	0	0
13	MF	(Kuwait) KUW	Yousef Al-Khubbazi	1	0	0+1	0	0	0	0	0	0	0	0	0	0	0
73	MF	(Netherlands) NED	Walid Ould-Chikh	7	1	3+1	0	0	0	0	0	3	1	0	0	0	0
Strikers
77	FW	(Nigeria) NGR	Anayo Iwuala	8	2	4	1	0	0	1	1	2+1	0	0	0	0	0
99	FW	(Kuwait) KUW	Hussain Al-Aryan	0	0	0	0	0	0	0	0	0	0	0	0	0	0
70	FW	(Kuwait) KUW	Yousef Sabah	0	0	0	0	0	0	0	0	0	0	0	0	0	0
11	FW	(Kuwait) KUW	Talal Al-Qaisi	5	0	0+4	0	0	0	0+1	0	0	0	0	0	0	0
9	FW	(Kuwait) KUW	Ali Al Doukhi	6	2	0+3	2	0	0	0	0	1+2	0	0	0	0	0
18	FW	(Ethiopia) ETH	Kenean Markneh	11	2	7	2	0	0	1	0	2+1	0	0	0	0	0
98	FW	(Palestine) PLE	Zaid Qunbar	11	4	7	4	0	0	1	0	2+1	0	0	0	0	0

=== Goalscorers ===
Last Updated: 29 June 2026

Rank	No.	Pos.	Nat.	Player	League	Emir Cup	ACL2	ACL	Super Cup	Crown Prince Cup	Total
1	98	FW	(Palestine)	Zaid Qunbar	3	0	0	0	0	0	3
2	77	FW	(Nigeria)	Anayo Iwuala	0	0	1	0	0	0	1
2	17	FW	(Kuwait)	Ali Khalaf	1	0	0	0	0	0	1
2	17	FW	(Kuwait)	Ali Al Doukhi	1	0	0	0	0	0	1
2	18	FW	(Ethiopia)	Kenean Markneh	1	0	0	0	0	0	1
2	10	FW	(Kuwait)	Bandar Al Salamah	1	0	0	0	0	0	1
2	10	DF	(Kuwait)	Abdulwahab Al-Awadi	1	0	0	0	0	0	1
Total					8	0	1	0	0	0	9

=== Assists ===
Last Updated: 29 June 2026

=== Clean sheets ===
Last Updated: 29 June 2026
