= 2025–26 Al-Arabi SC season =

Al-Arabi
2025–26 season
- President: Abdulaziz Ashour
- Head coach: Nasser Al-Shatti
- Stadium: Sabah Al Salem Stadium; Sulaibikhat Stadium (selected matches)
- Premier League: Runner-ups
- Kuwait Emir Cup: TBD
- AFC Challenge League: Group Stage
- Kuwait Super Cup: Semi-final
- Kuwait Crown Prince Cup: Winners
- Kuwait Emir Cup 24-25: Finalist

The 2025–26 season is Al-Arabi's 64th consecutive season in the top flight of Kuwait football. The club participates in the Premier League, the Kuwait Emir Cup, the AFC Challenge League, the Super Cup and Kuwait Crown Prince Cup.

The season covers the period from 1 July 2025 to 30 June 2026.

== Overview ==
The club signed with Portuguese manager Marco Alves after the departure of Nasser Al-Shatti, and alongside Ahmed Hayel former club striker as assistant coach. With the club Summer camp being in United Arab Emirates where the club played 6 Friendlies ahead of the season.

The club was initiated new contract extensions to multiple domestic players in pre season after the Hassan Al-Enezi incident with Jordanian club Al-Ahli.

Marco Alves and his crew were sacked after the first league loss to Al-Nasr, and resigned with Nasser Al-Shatti days later.

== Players ==
=== First-team squad ===
As of 31 January 2025

Note: Flags indicate national team as defined under FIFA eligibility rules; some limited exceptions apply. Players may hold more than one non-FIFA nationality.

No.	Pos.	Nation	Player
3	DF	KUW	Abdullah Ammar
4	DF	KUW	Mohammed Khaled
5	DF	SYR	Jumma Abboud
7	MF	KUW	Bader Al-Fadhel
8	MF	KUW	Hussain Ashkanani
9	ST	KUW	Salman Al-Awadhi
10	MF	KUW	Bandar Al Salamah
11	FW	NGA	Christopher John
12	MF	KUW	Bader Al-Mutairi
14	MF	KUW	Khaled Al-Mershed
15	DF	KUW	Hamad Al-Qallaf
16	DF	KUW	Ali Abdul Rasul
17	MF	KUW	Ali Khalaf
19	FW	KUW	Abdulrahman Karam

No.	Pos.	Nation	Player
20	MF	KUW	Nayef Al-Shemmari
21	MF	IRN	Ali Porusaniei
22	GK	KUW	Sulaiman Abdulghafour
25	DF	KUW	Abdulwahab Al-Awadi
26	GK	KUW	Ahmed Dashti
29	DF	KUW	Jassem Shammouh
30	MF	KUW	Yousef Majed
32	MF	KUW	Ahmed Awadh
42	DF	KUW	Abdullah Essa
77	FW	NGA	Anayo Iwuala
99	FW	KUW	Hussain Al-Aryan

== Technical staff ==
Position	Name
Manager	(Portugal) Marco Alves
Assistant Manager	(Jordan) Ahmed Hayel
Assistant Manager	(Portugal) Blessing Lumueno
Analyist	(Algeria) Mahfoud Janad
Physiotherapist	(Tunisia) Khalil AlJabable

== Transfers and loans ==
=== Transfers in ===
Entry date	Position	No.	Player	From club	Fee	Ref.
12 July 2025	DF	12	(Kuwait) Hamad Al-Harbi	(Kuwait) Kazma	Free	
15 July 2025	MF	18	(France) Hassimi Fadiga	(Bulgaria) Levski Sofia	Free	
15 July 2025	DF	28	(Uganda) Kenneth Semakula	(Tunisia) Club Africain	Free	
21 July 2025	DF	2	(Iran) Abdulaziz Nasari	(Kuwait) Qadsia	Free	
29 July 2025	FW	20	(Belgium) Julien Ngoy	(Belgium) Mechelen	Free	
28 August 2025	DF	28	(Morocco) Nabil Marmouk	(Morocco) Wydad AC	Free	
12 September 2025	FW	90	(Kuwait) Omar Al-Azmi		Free	
20 September 2025	FW	9	(Palestine) Zaid Qunbar	(Libya) Al Ahly	Free	
11 January 2026	MF	19	(Bahrain) Kamil Al-Aswad	(Bahrain) Al-Khaldiya	undisclosed	
25 February 2026	DF	29	(Brazil) Reynaldo	(Brazil) Remo	undisclosed	
25 February 2026	DF	28	(Brazil) Leonardo Sheldon	(Saudi Arabia) Al-Arabi	undisclosed	

Expenditure: ▲$0

=== Transfers out ===
Exit date	Position	No.	Player	To club	Fee	Ref.
16 June 2025	MF	98	(Bahrain) Kamil Al-Aswad	(Bahrain) Al-Khaldiya	End of loan	
16 June 2025	FW	23	(Morocco) Hamza Khabba	(Morocco) AS FAR	Free	
16 June 2025	DF	13	(Algeria) Sofiane Bouchar	(Kuwait) Qadsia	Free	
20 June 2025	MF	78	(Kuwait) Dhahi Al-Shammari	(Kuwait) Al-Shabab	Free	
29 June 2025	MF	6	(Kuwait) Sultan Al Enezi	(Kuwait) Kazma	Free	
18 July 2025	DF	2	(Kuwait) Hassan Al-Enezi	(Jordan) Al Ahli	$117,800	
24 August 2025	DF	28	(Uganda) Kenneth Semakula	(Saudi Arabia) Al-Adalah	Free	

Total income: ▲$117,800

=== Loans out ===
Start date	End date	Position	No.	Player	To club	Fee	Ref.
8 August 2024	31 July 2026	GK	99	(Kuwait) Hussain Kankouni	(Kuwait) Kazma	None	
13 July 2025	31 July 2026	FW	91	(Kuwait) Magdad Saffar	(Kuwait) Burgan	None	
25 July 2025	31 July 2026	GK	31	(Kuwait) Abdulredha Shehab	(Kuwait) Burgan	None	

== Pre-season and friendlies ==
Win Draw Loss Fixtures

31 July 2025 Friendly	Al-Arabi (Kuwait Football Association)	1–2	(United Arab Emirates Football Association) Hatta	Dubai, United Arab Emirates
18:30 AST	Iwuala 68'		igbokwe 38' 43'	Stadium: Rashid Stadium; Referee: Hamad Ali Yousef Abdulla

6 August 2025 2025 BIT	Al-Arabi (Kuwait Football Association)	0–1	(United Arab Emirates Football Association) Baniyas	Abu Dhabi, United Arab Emirates
18:30 AST				Stadium: Baniyas Stadium; Referee: Mohammed Abdulla Hassan

8 August 2025 2025 BIT	Al-Arabi (Kuwait Football Association)	0–2	(United Arab Emirates Football Association) Al-Wahda	Abu Dhabi, United Arab Emirates
18:30 AST			Rivera 36' 85'	Stadium: Al-Nahyan Stadium; Referee: Mohammed Abdulla Hassan

21 August 2025 Friendly	Al-Arabi (Kuwait Football Association)	2-1	(United Arab Emirates Football Association) Dubai City	Dubai, United Arab Emirates
18:30 AST	Mohammed Khaled 19'; Bader Al-Fadhel 57'			Stadium: Umm al Quwain Stadium; Referee: Mohammed Abdulla Hassan

24 August 2025 Friendly	Al-Arabi (Kuwait Football Association)	1–1	(United Arab Emirates Football Association) Al-Arabi	Dubai, United Arab Emirates
18:30 AST	17' Bader Al-Fadhel			Stadium: Umm al Quwain Stadium; Referee: Mohammed Abdulla Hassan

28 August 2025 Friendly	Al-Arabi (Kuwait Football Association)	2–2	(United Arab Emirates Football Association) Shabab Al-Ahli	Dubai, United Arab Emirates
18:30 AST	Iwuala 55' 80'			Stadium: Rashid Stadium; Referee: Hamad Ali Yousef Abdulla

4 September 2025 Friendly	Al-Arabi (Kuwait Football Association)	1-0	(Kuwait Football Association) Al-Jahra	Mansuriyah, Kuwait City
AST 20:40	John 90'			Stadium: Sabah Al Salem Stadium

7 September 2025 Friendly	Al-Arabi (Kuwait Football Association)	2-1	(Kuwait Football Association) Al-Tadamon	Mansuriyah, Kuwait City
AST 20:40	Ngoy 10'; John 32'			Stadium: Sabah Al Salem Stadium

8 October 2025 Friendly	Al-Arabi (Kuwait Football Association)	1-1	(Kuwait Football Association) Burgan	Mansuriyah, Kuwait City
AST 20:40	Ngoy 25'			Stadium: Sabah Al Salem Stadium

12 October 2025 Friendly	Al-Arabi (Kuwait Football Association)	3-1	(Kuwait Football Association) Al-Yarmouk	Mansuriyah, Kuwait City
AST 20:40	Ngoy 4'; Yousef Majed 34' 66'			Stadium: Sabah Al Salem Stadium

27 November 2025 Friendly	Al-Arabi (Kuwait Football Association)	4-0	(Kuwait Football Association) Khaitan	Mansuriyah, Kuwait City
AST 20:40	Fadiga 4'; Ngoy 7'; John 32' Zain Al-Abdien Ma’rafi 74'			Stadium: Sabah Al Salem Stadium

4 December 2025 Friendly	Al-Arabi (Kuwait Football Association)	1-0	(Kuwait Football Association) Al-Yarmouk	Mansuriyah, Kuwait City
AST 20:40	Ngoy 84'			Stadium: Sabah Al Salem Stadium

10 December 2025 Friendly	Al-Arabi (Kuwait Football Association)	3-2	(Kuwait Football Association) Al-Salmiyah	Mansuriyah, Kuwait City
AST 20:40	Fadiga 20'; Abdulrahman 66'; Iwuala 76'			Stadium: Sabah Al Salem Stadium

== Competitions ==
=== Overview ===
Competition	Record							
Competition	Pld	W	D	L	GF	GA	GD	Win %
Premier League	22	10	6	6	34	17	+17	45.45
Emir Cup	1	1	0	0	2	0	+2	100.00
Emir Cup (24-25)	1	0	0	1	0	2	−2	0.00
AFC Challenge League	4	2	2	0	9	4	+5	50.00
Super Cup	1	0	0	1	3	4	−1	0.00
Crown Prince Cup	4	4	0	0	9	1	+8	100.00
Total	33	17	8	8	56	28	+28	51.52

Source: Competitions

=== Premier League ===
==== Results by round ====
Round	1	2	3	4	5	6	7	8	9	10	11	12	13	14	15	16	17	18	19	20	21	22	23
Ground	H	A	H	A	H	A	H	A	A	A	H	A	H	A	H	A	H	H	N	N	N	N	N
Result	W	W	D	D	W	W	W	L	W	W	D	L	L	L	D	D	W	D	W	W	L	L	W
Position	2	2	2	2	2	2	2	3	2	2	2	2	2	2	3	4	3	3	3	2	2	4	2

First match(es) will be played on 17 August 2025. Source:
A = Away; H = Home; W = Win; D = Draw; L = Loss

==== Matches ====
12 September 2025 1	Al-Arabi	2-0	Al-Shabab	Mansuriyah, Kuwait City
AST 20:40	Fadiga 30'; Al-Awadhi 84'			Stadium: Sabah Al Salem Stadium; Attendance: 6,538

17 September 2025 2	Al-Fahaheel	0-3	Al-Arabi	Mangaf, Fahaheel
AST 20:35	Fadiga 43'; Ngoy 56'; Porusaniei 72'			Stadium: Fahaheel Stadium; Attendance: 3,749

21 September 2025 3	Al-Arabi	1-1	Kuwait	Mansuriyah, Kuwait City
AST 19:30	Al-Awadhi 48'			Stadium: Sabah Al Salem Stadium; Attendance: 10,400

27 September 2025 4	Kazma	0-0	Al-Arabi	Adiliya, Kuwait City
AST 20:20				Stadium: Al-Sadaqua Walsalam Stadium; Attendance: 2,782

19 October 2025 5	Al-Arabi	3-1	Al-Salmiya	Mansuriyah, Kuwait City
AST 19:55	Qunbar 7' (pen.); Fadiga 47'; Al-Harbi 81'			Stadium: Sabah Al Salem Stadium; Attendance: 6,223

28 December 2025 6	Al-Tadamon	1-2	Al-Arabi	Al Farwaniyah
AST 21:00			Hassimi Fadiga 20'; Anayo Iwuala 63'	Stadium: Farwaniya Stadium; Attendance: 4,824

4 November 2025 7	Al-Arabi	4-0	Al-Jahra	Mansuriyah, Kuwait City
AST 19:40	Fadiga 18'; Iwuala 24' 47'; John 74'			Stadium: Sabah Al Salem Stadium; Attendance: 9,423

9 November 2025 8	Al-Nasr	2-1	Al-Arabi	Ardiya, Al Farwaniyah
AST 17:26			Anayo Iwuala 26'	Stadium: Ali Sabah Al-Salem Stadium; Attendance: 3,225

17 December 2025 9	Qadsia	1-2	Al-Arabi	Hawally, Kuwait
AST 21:00			Christopher John 41'; Porusaniei 55'	Stadium: Mohammed Al-Hamad Stadium; Attendance: 16,428

2 January 2026 10	Al-Shabab	0-5	Al-Arabi	Al-Ahmadi, Kuwait
AST 21:00			Al-Awadhi 53'; Qunbar 62'; Al-Fadhel 74'; Marmouk 82'; Majed 85'	Stadium: Al-Ahmadi Stadium; Attendance: 3,267

15 January 2026 11	Al-Arabi	1-1	Al-Fahaheel	Mansuriyah, Kuwait City
AST 21:00	Fadiga 57'			Stadium: Sabah Al Salem Stadium; Attendance: 4,783

24 January 2026 12	Kuwait	1-0	Al-Arabi	Sulaibikhat, Kuwait
AST 21:00				Stadium: Sulaibikhat Stadium; Attendance: 9,271

7 February 2026 13	Al-Arabi	0-1	Kazma	Mansuriyah, Kuwait City
AST 21:00				Stadium: Sabah Al Salem Stadium

23 February 2026 14	Al-Salmiya	1-0	Al-Arabi	Al Salmiya, Kuwait
AST 21:00				Stadium: Thamir Stadium

21 May 2026 15	Al-Arabi	1-1	Al-Tadamon	Mansuriyah, Kuwait City
AST 19:00	Majed 39'			Stadium: Sabah Al Salem Stadium

25 May 2026 16	Al-Jahra	1-1	Al-Arabi	Jahra, Kuwait
AST 21:00	Bader Al-Fadhel 80'			Stadium: Mubarak Al-Aiar Stadium

30 May 2026 17	Al-Arabi	2-0	Al-Nasr	Mansuriyah, Kuwait City
AST 21:00	Al-Harbi 21'; Marmouk 45+1'			Stadium: Sabah Al Salem Stadium

13 June 2026 18	Al-Arabi	0-0	Qadsia	Mansuriyah, Kuwait City
AST 21:00				Stadium: Sabah Al Salem Stadium

16 June 2026 19	Al-Arabi	2-0	Kazma
AST 21:00	Qunbar 48'; Khalaf 59'

19 June 2026 20	Al-Arabi	2-0	Qadsia
AST 21:00	Al-Aswad 54'; Anayo Iwuala 84'

22 June 2026 21	Kuwait	3-2	Al-Arabi
AST 21:00			Al-Garzaei 8'; Qunbar 77'

25 June 2026 22	Al-Arabi	0-1	Al-Salmiya
AST 21:00

29 June 2026 23	Al-Arabi	3-0	Al-Fahaheel
AST 21:00	Qunbar 27' 41'; Khalaf 71'

=== Emir Cup ===
==== 2024-25 Final ====
- this is the postponed Final from the 2024-25 season

23 December 2025 2024-25 Final	Al-Arabi	0-2	Kuwait	Farwaniya, Kuwait
AST 20:40				Stadium: Jaber Al-Ahmad International Stadium; Attendance: 32,326

==== 2025-26 ====
15 February 2026 Round of 16	Al-Arabi	2-0	Sahel
AST 20:40	Fadiga 17'; Al-Awadhi 90+8'

28 February 2026 Quarter-Final	Al-Arabi	v	Khaitan
AST 20:40

=== AFC Challenge League ===
==== Preliminary stage ====
12 August 2025 West Q1	Maziya (Maldives)	0-4	(Kuwait) Al-Arabi	Maldives
AST 13:00			Iwuala 3'; Ngoy 41'; John 55'; Ashkanani 87'	Stadium: National Football Stadium; Attendance: 328; Referee: (Jordan) Ahmad Faisal

==== Group Stage ====
25 October 2025 1	Safa (Lebanon)	2-2	(Kuwait) Al-Arabi	Bishkek, Kyrgyzstan
AST 13:00			Anayo Iwuala 50' (pen.); Hayek 68' (o.g.)	Stadium: Dolen Omurzakov Stadium; Referee: (Iran) Morteza Mansourian

28 October 2025 2	Al-Arabi (Kuwait)	2-1	(Tajikistan) Regar-TadAZ	Bishkek, Kyrgyzstan
AST 13:00	Abdulaziz Nasari 40'; Yousef Majed 70'			Stadium: Dolen Omurzakov Stadium; Referee: (Uzbekistan) Axrol Riskullayev

31 October 2025 3	Muras United (Kyrgyzstan)	1-1	(Kuwait) Al-Arabi	Bishkek, Kyrgyzstan
AST 13:00			Anayo Iwuala 21'	Stadium: Dolen Omurzakov Stadium; Attendance: 23,000; Referee: (Iraq) Ahmed Kadhim

=== Super Cup ===
28 January 2026 Semi-Final	Al-Arabi	3-4	Qadsia	Jaber Al-Ahmad International Stadium
AST 20:00	Iwuala 2'; Al-Aswad 9'; Fadiga 13'			Attendance: 18,236

=== Crown Prince Cup ===
7 January 2026 Round of 16	Al-Arabi	2-1	Al-Yarmouk
AST 20:00	Iwuala 48'; Qunbar 51' (pen.)

11 January 2026 Quarter-Final	Al-Arabi	2-0	Qadsia
AST 20:00	Zaid Qunbar 46'; Yousef Majed 95'

19 January 2026 Semi-Final	Al-Arabi	2-0	Al-Fahaheel
AST 20:00	Qunbar 51'; John 60'

18 May 2026 Final	Al-Arabi	3-0	Kuwait
AST 20:00	Al-Nassar 53'; Khalaf 80'; Qunbar 90'			Attendance: 47,600

== Statistics ==
=== Appearances ===
Last updated on 29 June 2026.

No.	Pos	Nat	Player	Total		Premier League		Emir Cup		ACL		Super Cup		Crown Prince Cup	
No.	Pos	Nat	Player	Apps	Goals	Apps	Goals	Apps	Goals	Apps	Goals	Apps	Goals	Apps	Goals
Goalkeepers
22	GK	(Kuwait) KUW	Sulaiman Abdulghafour	29	0	19	0	2	0	4	0	0	0	4	0
26	GK	(Kuwait) KUW	Ahmed Dashti	3	0	2	0	0	0	0	0	1	0	0	0
31	GK	(Kuwait) KUW	Abdullah Al-Ayoub	3	0	2+1	0	0	0	0	0	0	0	0	0
Defenders
28	DF	(Brazil) BRA	Leonardo Sheldon	9	0	8	0	0	0	0	0	0	0	1	0
25	DF	(Uganda) UGA	Kenneth Semakula	1	0	0	0	0	0	0+1	0	0	0	0	0
5	DF	(Syria) SYR	Jumma Abboud	22	0	12+1	0	1	0	4	0	1	0	2+1	0
3	DF	(Kuwait) KUW	Abdullah Ammar	18	0	9+2	0	0	0	0+3	0	0+1	0	1+2	0
4	DF	(Kuwait) KUW	Mohammed Khaled	30	1	17+3	0	2	0	3	0	1	0	4	1
12	DF	(Kuwait) KUW	Hamad Al-Harbi	25	2	11+6	2	0+1	0	2+1	0	0+1	0	0+3	0
15	DF	(Kuwait) KUW	Hamad Al-Qallaf	0	0	0	0	0	0	0	0	0	0	0	0
41	DF	(Kuwait) KUW	Abdullah Essa	2	0	0+2	0	0	0	0	0	0	0	0	0
16	DF	(Kuwait) KUW	Ali Abdul Rasul	15	0	4+4	0	1	0	1+3	0	0	0	2	0
2	DF	(Kuwait) KUW	Abdulwahab Al-Awadi	25	0	13+1	0	2	0	4	0	1	0	4	0
21	DF	(Iran) IRN	Abdulaziz Nasari	18	1	9+3	0	0+1	0	3	1	0	0	1+1	0
27	DF	(Morocco) MAR	Nabil Marmouk	23	2	17+1	2	1	0	2	0	1	0	1	0
29	DF	(Kuwait) KUW	Jassem Shammouh	0	0	0	0	0	0	0	0	0	0	0	0
23	DF	(Kuwait) KUW	Nasser Saeed	4	0	0+1	0	0	0	0+1	0	0	0	1+1	0
Midfielders
7	MF	(Kuwait) KUW	Bader Al-Fadhel	20	2	4+12	2	0+2	0	0+1	0	0	0	1	0
8	MF	(Kuwait) KUW	Hussain Ashkanani	1	1	0	0	0	0	0+1	1	0	0	0	0
10	MF	(Kuwait) KUW	Bandar Al Salamah	9	0	4+5	0	0	0	0	0	0	0	0	0
12	MF	(Kuwait) KUW	Bader Al-Mutairi	0	0	0	0	0	0	0	0	0	0	0	0
40	MF	(Kuwait) KUW	Saud Al-Anbari	1	0	0+1	0	0	0	0	0	0	0	0	0
97	MF	(France) FRA	Hassimi Fadiga	23	8	14	6	2	1	4	0	1	1	2	0
14	MF	(Kuwait) KUW	Khaled Al-Mershed	21	0	10+5	0	2	0	0	0	1	0	3	0
17	MF	(Kuwait) KUW	Ali Khalaf	11	2	2+7	1	0	0	0	0	0	0	0+2	1
20	MF	(Kuwait) KUW	Nayef Al-Shemmari	0	0	0	0	0	0	0	0	0	0	0	0
6	MF	(Iran) IRN	Ali Porusaniei	22	2	12	2	2	0	4	0	0+1	0	3	0
30	MF	(Kuwait) KUW	Yousef Majed	25	4	9+8	2	0+1	0	3+1	1	0	0	1+2	1
32	MF	(Kuwait) KUW	Ahmed Awadh	0	0	0	0	0	0	0	0	0	0	0	0
88	MF	(Kuwait) KUW	Abdullah Al-Garzaie	11	1	6+4	1	0	0	0	0	0	0	1	0
28	MF	(Kuwait) KUW	Omar Al-Azmi	2	0	1+1	0	0	0	0	0	0	0	0	0
90	MF	(Kuwait) KUW	Saleh Mohammed	1	0	0+1	0	0	0	0	0	0	0	0	0
19	MF	(Bahrain) BHR	Kamil Al-Aswad	14	2	10	1	1	0	0	0	1	1	2	0
Strikers
9	FW	(Kuwait) KUW	Salman Al-Awadhi	20	4	4+8	3	0+2	1	0+4	0	1	0	0+1	0
11	FW	(Nigeria) NGA	Christopher John	19	4	7+4	2	1	0	2+2	1	0	0	2+1	1
77	FW	(Nigeria) NGA	Anayo Iwuala	32	9	20+1	4	2	0	4	3	1	1	4	1
99	FW	(Kuwait) KUW	Hussain Al-Aryan	4	0	2+2	0	0	0	0	0	0	0	0	0
70	FW	(Kuwait) KUW	Yousef Sabah	6	0	1+4	0	0	0	0	0	0	0	0+1	0
71	FW	(Kuwait) KUW	Abdulrahman Karam	6	0	0+5	0	0	0	0	0	0+1	0	0	0
20	FW	(Belgium) BEL	Julien Ngoy	3	2	2	1	0	0	1	1	0	0	0	0
98	FW	(Palestine) PLE	Zaid Qunbar	29	8	17+2	4	2	0	3	0	1	0	4	4

=== Goalscorers ===
Rank	No.	Pos.	Nat.	Player	League	Emir Cup	ACL	Super Cup	Crown Prince Cup	Total
1	77	FW	(Nigeria)	Anayo Iwuala	5	0	3	1	1	10
2	97	MF	(France)	Hassimi Fadiga	6	1	0	1	0	8
3	98	MF	(Palestine)	Zaid Qunbar	6	0	0	0	4	10
4	11	FW	(Nigeria)	Christopher John	2	0	1	0	1	4
4	39	FW	(Kuwait)	Salman Al-Awadhi	3	1	0	0	0	4
5	30	MF	(Kuwait)	Yousef Majed	2	0	1	0	1	4
6	6	MF	(Iran)	Ali Porusaniei	2	0	0	0	0	2
6	9	FW	(Belgium)	Julien Ngoy	1	0	1	0	0	2
7	8	MF	(Kuwait)	Hussain Ashkanani	0	0	1	0	0	1
7	12	MF	(Kuwait)	Hamad Al-Harbi	2	0	0	0	0	2
7	7	MF	(Kuwait)	Bader Al-Fadhel	2	0	0	0	0	2
7	19	MF	(Bahrain)	Kamil Al-Aswad	1	0	0	1	0	2
7	17	MF	(Kuwait)	Ali Khalaf	2	0	0	0	1	3
7	17	MF	(Kuwait)	Abdullah Al-Garzaei	1	0	0	0	0	1
7	21	DF	(Morocco)	Nabil Marmouk	2	0	0	0	0	2
7	21	DF	(Kuwait)	Mohammed Khaled	0	0	0	0	1	1
7	21	DF	(Iran)	Abdulaziz Nasari	0	0	1	0	0	1
Own goal					0	0	1	0	0	1
Total					37	2	9	3	9	60

Last Updated: 29 June 2026

=== Assists ===
Rank	No.	Pos.	Nat.	Player	League	Emir Cup	ACL	Super Cup	Crown Prince Cup	Total
1	4	DF	(Kuwait)	Mohammed Khaled	0	0	1	0	0	1
1	97	MF	(France)	Hassimi Fadiga	2	0	1	1	1	5
1	6	MF	(Iran)	Ali Porusaniei	0	0	2	0	0	2
1	30	MF	(Kuwait)	Yousef Majed	1	0	1	0	0	2
1	9	FW	(Belgium)	Julien Ngoy	1	0	0	0	0	1
1	98	FW	(Palestine)	Zaid Qunbar	5	0	2	0	1	8
1	11	FW	(Nigeria)	Christopher John	2	0	0	0	1	3
1	12	MF	(Kuwait)	Hamad Al-Harbi	2	0	0	0	0	2
1	14	MF	(Kuwait)	Khaled Al-Mershed	1	0	0	0	0	1
1	21	DF	(Iran)	Abdulaziz Nasari	2	0	0	0	0	2
1	27	DF	(Morocco)	Nabil Marmouk	1	0	0	0	0	1
1	11	FW	(Nigeria)	Anayo Iwuala	7	1	0	0	3	11
1	11	FW	(Kuwait)	Salman Al-Awadhi	0	0	0	2	0	2
1	5	DF	(Syria)	Jumma Abboud	1	0	0	0	0	1
1	22	GK	(Kuwait)	Sulaiman Abdulghafour	1	0	0	0	0	1
1	19	MF	(Bahrain)	Kamil Al-Aswad	1	0	0	0	1	2
1	19	MF	(Kuwait)	Ali Khalaf	1	0	0	0	1	2
Total					28	1	7	3	8	47

Last Updated: 29 June 2026

=== Clean sheets ===
Rank	No.	Pos.	Nat.	Player	League	Emir Cup	ACL	Super Cup	Crown Prince Cup	Total
1	22	GK	(Kuwait)	Sulaiman Abdulghafour	8	1	1	0	3	13
2	26	GK	(Kuwait)	Ahmed Dashti	2	0	0	0	0	2
3	31	GK	(Kuwait)	Abdullah Al-Ayoub	0	0	0	0	0	0
Total					10	1	1	0	3	17

Last Updated: 29 June 2026
