= 2023 SAFF Championship final =

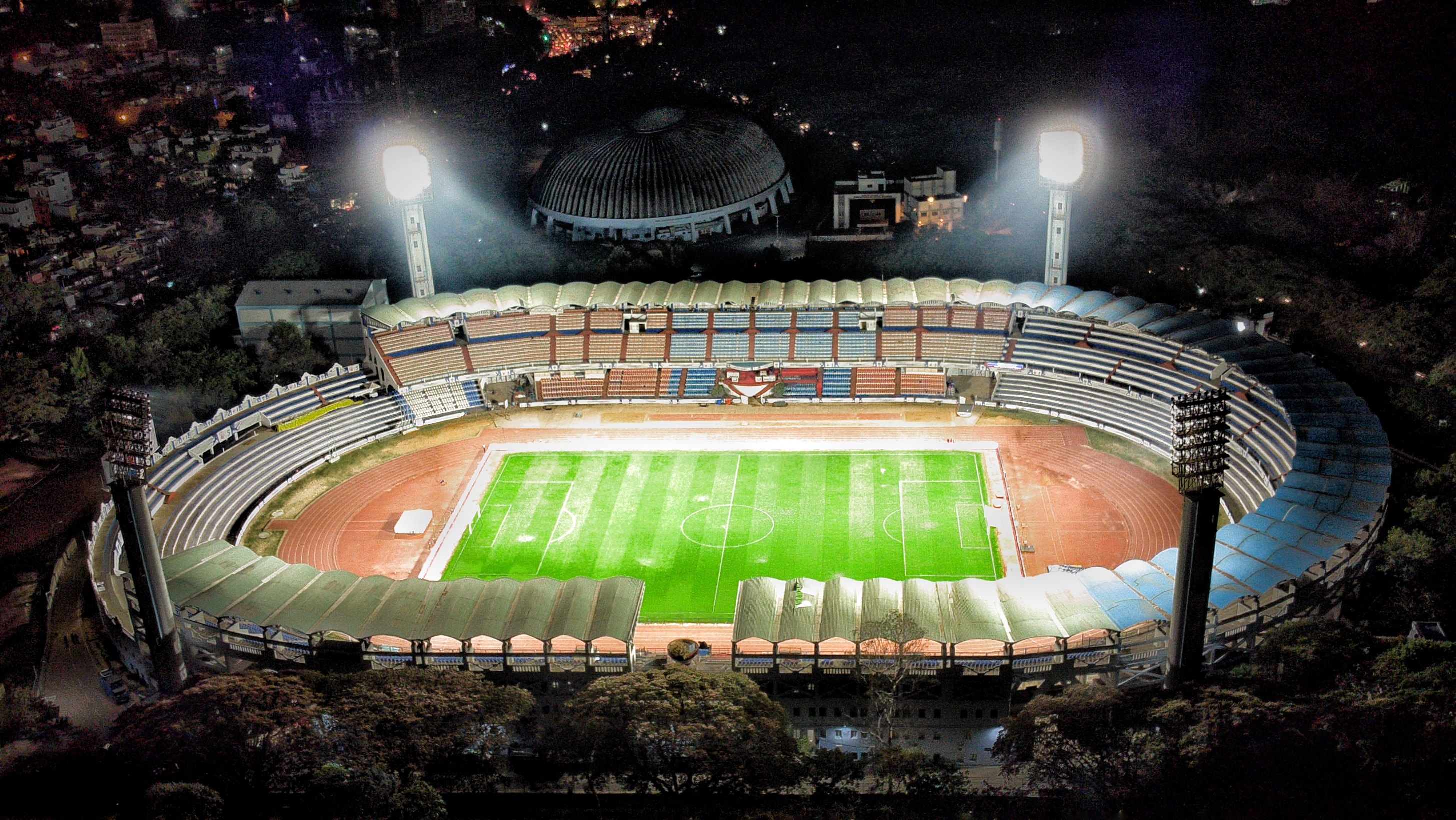
- The 2023 SAFF Championship final match held at this stadium.
- Event: 2023 SAFF Championship
Kuwait	India
1	1
- After extra time India won 5–4 on penalties
- Date: 4 July 2023
- Venue: Sree Kanteerava Stadium, Bengaluru
- Referee: Prajwal Chhetri (Nepal)
- Attendance: 26,380

The 2023 SAFF Championship final was the final match of the 2023 SAFF Championship. It took place on 4 July 2023 at the Bangalore, Karnataka. It was announced that the matches during the tournament, including the final, would take place at the Sree Kanteerava Stadium. India defeated Kuwait on penalty-shootouts after the match ended in a 1–1 draw after extra time.

== Venue ==
On 19 March 2023, it was announced that the matches during the tournament, including the final, would take place at the Sree Kanteerava Stadium in Bengaluru, Karnataka.

Bangalore	2023 SAFF Championship final is located in India
Sree Kanteerava Stadium	2023 SAFF Championship final is located in India
12°58′10.92″N 77°35′36.24″E	2023 SAFF Championship final is located in India
Capacity: 25,810	2023 SAFF Championship final is located in India
Aerial view Sree Kanteerava Stadium	2023 SAFF Championship final is located in India

== Route to the final ==
Kuwait played their first match against Nepal and won it 3–1. In their second game of the group stage they defeated Pakistan 4–0. Kuwait's last outing was against hosts India with the match ending in a 1–1 draw. The opponent for Kuwait in semi-final was Bangladesh, whom they defeated by a narrow margin of 1–0 in the extra time.

The Hosts started their campaign against Pakistan with a resounding 4–0 win. Sunil Chhetri scored his fourth international hat-trick and Udanta Singh scored the fourth goal. In the next match they saw of Nepal by 2–0 and the final match of the group stage against Kuwait resulted in a 1–1 stalemate. In the semi-final India locked horns with Lebanon and won on penalty shootout after the game ended in a goal less draw.

Kuwait
Round
India
Opponent
Result
Group stage
Opponent
Result
Nepal
1–3
Match 1
Pakistan
0–4
Pakistan
0–4
Match 2
Nepal
0–2
India
1–1
Match 3
Kuwait
1–1

Team	Pld	W	D	L	GF	GA	GD	Pts
Kuwait	3	2	1	0	8	2	+6	7
India	3	2	1	0	7	1	+6	7
Nepal	3	1	0	2	2	5	−3	3
Pakistan	3	0	0	3	0	9	−9	0

Final standings

Team	Pld	W	D	L	GF	GA	GD	Pts
Kuwait	3	2	1	0	8	2	+6	7
India	3	2	1	0	7	1	+6	7
Nepal	3	1	0	2	2	5	−3	3
Pakistan	3	0	0	3	0	9	−9	0

Opponent
Result
Knockout stage
Opponent
Result
Bangladesh
0–1 (a.e.t.)
Semi-finals
Lebanon
0–0 (2–4 p)

== Match ==
4 July 2023
19:30

Kuwait	1–1 (a.e.t.)	India
Khaldi 14'	Report	Chhangte 36'
Penalties
Daham (penalty missed); Otaibi (penalty scored); Dhaferi (penalty scored); Naji (penalty scored); Khaldi (penalty scored); Khalid (penalty missed)	4–5	(penalty scored) Chhetri; (penalty scored) Jhingan; (penalty scored) Chhangte; (penalty missed) Udanta; (penalty scored) S. Bose; (penalty scored) Mahesh

Sree Kanteerava Stadium, Bangalore
Attendance: 26,380
Referee: Prajwal Chhetri (Nepal)

Kuwait	India

GK	Abdulrahman Kameel
CB	Hassan Al-Enezi (substituted off) 28'
CB	Khalid El Ebrahim (c)
LB	Hamad Al-Qallaf (yellow card) 60' (substituted off) 87'
RB	Abdullah Ammar (yellow card) 46' (substituted off) 91'
CM	Redha Abujabarah (yellow card) 41' (substituted off) 87'
LW	Mohammad Daham (yellow card) 66'
CDM	Sultan Al Enezi (substituted off) 99'
CF	Shabaib Al-Khaldi
CAM	Ahmed Al-Dhefiri (yellow card) 46'
RW	Mobarak Al-Faneeni (substituted off) 69'
Substitutes:
CB	Hamad Al-Harbi (substituted on) 28'
RW	Eid Al-Rashidi (substituted on) 69'
CM	Mahdi Dashti (substituted on) 87'
LB	Fawaz Ayedh Al-Otaibi (substituted on) 87'
RB	Abdullah Ghanim (substituted on) 91' (yellow card) 115'
CDM	Abdulaziz Naji Mahran (substituted on) 99' (yellow card) 120'
Manager:
(Portugal) Rui Bento

GK	Gurpreet Singh Sandhu
CB	Anwar Ali (substituted off) 35'
CB	Sandesh Jhingan (yellow card) 28'
LB	Akash Mishra (substituted off) 113'
RB	Nikhil Poojari
CM	Anirudh Thapa (substituted off) 72'
LW	Ashique Kuruniyan (yellow card) 65' (substituted off) 72'
CDM	Jeakson Singh Thounaojam
CF	Sunil Chhetri (c)
CAM	Sahal Abdul Samad (substituted off) 90'
RW	Lallianzuala Chhangte
Substitutes:
CB	Mehtab Singh (substituted on) 35'
LW	Mahesh Singh Naorem (substituted on) 72'
CM	Rohit Kumar (substituted on) 72' (yellow card) 74'
CAM	Udanta Singh (substituted on) 90'
LB	Subhasish Bose (substituted on) 113'
Manager:
Mahesh Gawli (Note: Igor Stimac was suspended so his assistant coach Mahesh Gawli took charge for this match.)

Assistant referees:
Nani Ram Thapa Magar (Nepal)
Ahmed Hassan (Maldives)
Fourth official:
Pema Tshewang (Bhutan)
Match commissioner:
Mindu Dorji (Bhutan)
Referee assessor:
Suresh Srinivasan (India)

Match rules

- 90 minutes
- 30 minutes of extra time if necessary
- Penalty shoot-out if scores still level
- Maximum of fifteen named substitutes
- Maximum of five substitutions, with a sixth allowed in extra time (Note: Each team was given only three opportunities to make substitutions, with a fourth opportunity in extra time, excluding substitutions made at half-time, before the start of extra time and at half-time in extra time.)
- Maximum of one concussion substitution

== See also ==
2023 in SAFF
Men's
U-16 Championship	U-19 Championship	Senior Championship (Final)
Women's
U-17 Championship	U-20 Championship	
