= Salman Al-Awadhi =

Kuwaiti footballer (born 2001)

Personal information
- Full name: Salman Saud Abdulaziz Ali Mohammed Al-Awadhi
- Date of birth: 21 May 2001 (age 25)
- Place of birth: Kuwait
- Height: 1.76 m (5 ft 9 in)
- Position: Forward

Team information
- Current team: Al-Kuwait
- Number: 39

Youth career
- 2015-2022: Al-Arabi

Senior career*
Years	Team	Apps	(Gls)
2019–2026	Al-Arabi	79	(27)
2026–	Al-Kuwait	0	(0)

International career^{‡}
2018-2019	Kuwait U-20	12	(6)
2019-2024	Kuwait U-23	14	(9)
2022–	Kuwait	22	(1)
- * Club domestic league appearances and goals as of 3 May 2025 ‡ National team caps and goals as of 14 October 2025

Salman Al-Awadhi (born 21 May 2001) is a Kuwaiti professional soccer player who plays as a Forward for Al-Kuwait and Kuwait national football team.

== Club career ==
=== Al-Arabi ===
Salman made his debut in the 2019-20 Kuwaiti Premier League season, scoring two goals against Kuwait SC. During his first three seasons, he played for three divisions with the club, featuring as a substitute mainly. He scored an equalizer and the winning penalty against Kuwait SC in the Crown Prince Cup final. He also featured in AFC Champions League Two and AFC Challenge League seasons. Salman is regarded as a fast-paced dominant forward, and a regular contributor to the club.

== National career ==
Salman earned his first call-up in June 2022 in a friendly against Singapore. He scored his first goal against Yemen on 14 September 2024. He featured in the 26th Arabian Gulf Cup and 2023 SAFF Championship squads and played in the 2026 World Cup qualifiers.

== Career statistics ==
=== Club ===
As of 31 June 2026

Appearances and goals by club, season and competition
Club	Season	League			Cup		Continental		Other (Note: All appearance(s) in Kuwait Crown Prince Cup, Kuwait Super Cup, Kuwait Federation Cup)		Total	
Club	Season	Division	Apps	Goals	Apps	Goals	Apps	Goals	Apps	Goals	Apps	Goals
Al-Arabi	2019–20	KPL	6	4	0	0	—		0	0	6	4
Al-Arabi	2020–21	KPL	11	2	2	0	—		5	2	16	4
Al-Arabi	2021–22	KPL	13	4	1	0	—		4	3	18	7
Al-Arabi	2022–23	KPL	15	6	2	1	2 (Note: All appearance(s) in AFC Cup)	0	2	0	20	7
Al-Arabi	2023–24	KPL	11	5	2	1	2 (Note: All appearance(s) in AFC Cup)	0	1	0	15	6
Al-Arabi	2024–25	KPL	11	3	0	0	3 (Note: All appearance(s) in AFC Challenge League)	1	2	0	16	4
Al-Arabi	2025–26	KPL	12	3	2	1	4 (Note: All appearance(s) in AFC Challenge League)	0	2	0	20	4
Career total			79	27	9	3	11	1	16	5	105	36

=== International ===
As of match played 5 June 2025

National team	Year	Apps	Goals
Kuwait	2022	3	0
Kuwait	2023	5	0
Kuwait	2024	9	1
Kuwait	2025	6	0
Total		22	1

== International goals ==
Scores and results list Kuwait's goal tally first.

No.	Date	Venue	Opponent	Score	Result	Competition
1.	14 September 2024	Jaber Al-Ahmad International Stadium, Kuwait	Yemen	1–0	1–0	Friendly

== Honours ==
=== Al-Arabi ===
- Kuwait Premier League: 2020-21
- Kuwait Emir Cup: 2019-20
- Kuwait Crown Prince Cup: 2021-22, 2022-23, 2025-26
- Kuwait Super Cup: 2021

=== Kuwait ===
- SAFF Championship (Runner Up): 2023
