= Hussain Ashkanani =

Kuwaiti footballer (born 2002)

Personal information
- Full name: Hussain Ali Mohsin Ashkanani
- Date of birth: 26 January 2002 (age 24)
- Place of birth: Kuwait
- Height: 1.84 m (6 ft 0 in)
- Position: Midfielder

Team information
- Current team: Al-Arabi
- Number: 8

Youth career
- 2012-2022: Al-Arabi

Senior career*
Years	Team	Apps	(Gls)
2018–	Al-Arabi	107	(1)

International career^{‡}
2020–2025	Kuwait U-23	9	(1)
2021–	Kuwait	8	(0)
- * Club domestic league appearances and goals as of 5 June 2025 ‡ National team caps and goals as of 5 June 2025

Hussain Ali Mohsin Ashkanani (born 26 January 2002) is a Kuwaiti professional footballer who plays as a center back for Al-Arabi and Kuwait national football team.

== Club career ==
=== Al-Arabi SC ===
==== 2018–2023 ====
Ashkanani made his debut in the 2018–19 Kuwait Federation Cup where he played 4 matches in the group stage, and made his league debut in the final game of the 2018–19 coming on for Ali Maqseed. After winning both Emir Cup and 2020–21 Kuwaiti Premier League he was named young player of the season and soon after extended his contract to 2028, later won the award again in 2022–23 Kuwaiti Premier League and made his AFC Cup Debut.

==== 2023–present ====
After a successful 5 years, the decline came as Ashkanani's performance dropped and was not called up to the national team a season to forget. the following season Ashkanani became a starter alongside Ali Porusaniei following the departure of Sultan Al Enezi, and scored in the AFC Challenge League against Al-Seeb Club, with the beginning of the 2025-26 an ACL injury ending his season short.

== National career ==
Ashkanani made his national team debut on March 25 2021 subbed in the last 5 minutes against Saudi Arabia but was dropped after 3 friendlies. Made it back into the squad in 2024 under Juan Antonio Pizzi for 2026 World Cup qualifiers.

== Career statistics ==
=== Club ===
As of 21 May 2025

Appearances and goals by club, season and competition
Club	Season	League			Cup		Continental		Other (Note: All appearance(s) in Kuwait Crown Prince Cup, Kuwait Super Cup, Kuwait Federation Cup)		Total	
Club	Season	Division	Apps	Goals	Apps	Goals	Apps	Goals	Apps	Goals	Apps	Goals
Al-Arabi	2018–19	KPL	2	0	0	0	—		4	0	6	0
Al-Arabi	2019–20	KPL	4	0	2	0	—		4	0	10	0
Al-Arabi	2020–21	KPL	18	0	2	0	—		6	0	26	0
Al-Arabi	2021–22	KPL	20	0	3	0	4 (Note: All appearance(s) in AFC Cup)	0	4	0	31	0
Al-Arabi	2022–23	KPL	21	0	3	0	—		3	0	27	0
Al-Arabi	2023–24	KPL	22	1	2	0	1 (Note: All appearance(s) in AFC Cup)	0	3	0	27	1
Al-Arabi	2024–25	KPL	20	0	3	0	7 (Note: All appearance(s) in AFC Challenge League)	1	3	0	33	1
Al-Arabi	2025–26	KPL	0	0	0	0	1 (Note: All appearance(s) in AFC Challenge League)	1	0	0	1	1
Career total			107	1	15	0	13	2	24	0	159	3

=== International ===
As of match played 5 June 2025

National team	Year	Apps	Goals
Kuwait	2021	3	0
Kuwait	2022	0	0
Kuwait	2023	0	0
Kuwait	2024	3	0
Kuwait	2025	2	0
Total		8	0

== Honours ==
=== Al-Arabi ===
- Kuwait Premier League: 2020-21
- Kuwait Emir Cup: 2019-20
- Kuwait Crown Prince Cup: 2021-22, 2022-23
- Kuwait Super Cup: 2021

=== Individual ===
- Kuwaiti Premier League Young Player of the Season: 2020-21, 2022-23
