= AUM Opera House =

Opera house in Kuwait

Coordinates: 29.165°N 48.099°E

The AUM Opera House ( للأوبرا AUM دار) is an opera house and performing arts venue inside the Cultural Center of the American University of the Middle East (AUM) in Egaila, Kuwait.

The opera house is expected to open its doors in the fall of 2017 as announced.

The AUM Opera House includes two theaters that can host between 500 and 1,500 individuals and around 10,000 square meters of halls and display areas.

The British company Theatretech is one of the companies that supervised the design and construction of theatres at the AUM Cultural Center.
