= Jumma Abboud =

Syrian footballer (born 1999)

Jumaa Abboud
Personal information
- Full name: Jumaa Abboud Al-Zlit
- Date of birth: 20 March 1999 (age 27)
- Place of birth: Kuwait City, Kuwait
- Height: 1.88 m (6 ft 2 in)
- Position: Center-back

Team information
- Current team: Al-Arabi
- Number: 2

Youth career
- 2012–2017: Al-Arabi

Senior career*
| Years | Team | Apps | (Gls) |
| 2017– | Al-Arabi | 165 | (6) |

International career^{‡}
| 2026– | Syria | 1 | (0) |
- * Club domestic league appearances and goals as of 5 June 2025 ‡ National team caps and goals as of 27 September 2026

Jumma Abboud (Arabic: جمعه عبود; born 20 March 1999) is a professional footballer who plays as a center-back for Al-Arabi. Born in Kuwait, he represented the Syrian national football team.

== Club career ==
Jumma made his debut in the 2017–2018 season coming from Al-Arabi's youth system.

In the 2019–2020 season, Jumma played a more predominant role in both center-back and right-back positions in the team having rotating roles. After winning the Kuwait Emir Cup and Kuwaiti Premier League, Jumma found himself as a starter for the club in both positions and having more of a right wing back role at times.

He had scored multiple times throughout his career, including goals in Kuwait Crown Prince Cup final in the 2022–23 season, and the AFC Challenge League.

In March 2023, Hidd SCC approached Jumma since his contract was up in June 2023 and to gain Bahraini citizenship, he ultimately resigned with Al-Arabi until 2028.

== Career statistics ==
=== Club ===
As of 30 June 2026

Appearances and goals by club, season and competition
| Club | Season | League | | | Cup | | Continental | | Other (Note: All appearance(s) in Kuwait Crown Prince Cup, Kuwait Super Cup, Kuwait Federation Cup) | | Total | |
| Club | Season | Division | Apps | Goals | Apps | Goals | Apps | Goals | Apps | Goals | Apps | Goals |
|---|---|---|---|---|---|---|---|---|---|---|---|---|
| Al-Arabi | 2017–18 | Kuwaiti Premier League | 5 | 0 | 1 | 0 | — | | 5 | 0 | 11 | 0 |
| Al-Arabi | 2018–19 | Kuwaiti Premier League | 10 | 0 | 1 | 0 | — | | 5 | 0 | 16 | 0 |
| Al-Arabi | 2019–20 | Kuwaiti Premier League | 18 | 0 | 3 | 0 | — | | 5 | 0 | 26 | 0 |
| Al-Arabi | 2020–21 | Kuwaiti Premier League | 21 | 1 | 2 | 0 | — | | 5 | 0 | 27 | 1 |
| Al-Arabi | 2021–22 | Kuwaiti Premier League | 24 | 2 | 3 | 0 | 4 (Note: All appearance(s) in AFC Cup) | 0 | 5 | 0 | 36 | 2 |
| Al-Arabi | 2022–23 | Kuwaiti Premier League | 23 | 1 | 3 | 1 | — | | 5 | 1 | 31 | 3 |
| Al-Arabi | 2023–24 | Kuwaiti Premier League | 25 | 1 | 3 | 0 | 5 (Note: All appearance(s) in AFC Cup) | 0 | 2 | 0 | 35 | 1 |
| Al-Arabi | 2024–25 | Kuwaiti Premier League | 27 | 1 | 3 | 0 | 7 (Note: All appearance(s) in AFC Challenge League) | 1 | 3 | 0 | 40 | 2 |
| Al-Arabi | 2025–26 | Kuwaiti Premier League | 13 | 0 | 1 | 0 | 4 (Note: All appearance(s) in AFC Challenge League) | 0 | 4 | 0 | 22 | 0 |
| Career total | | | 165 | 6 | 19 | 1 | 22 | 1 | 39 | 1 | 245 | 9 |

== Honours ==
=== Al-Arabi ===
- Kuwait Premier League: 2020-21
- Kuwait Emir Cup: 2019-20
- Kuwait Crown Prince Cup: 2021-22, 2022-23, 2025-26
- Kuwait Super Cup: 2021
