= American University of the Middle East =

Private university in Kuwait

American University of the Middle East (AUM)
- Motto: We are as good as our Students
- Type: Private
- Established: 2005; 21 years ago
- Undergraduates: 15,000+
- Location: Egaila, Kuwait; 29.165°N 48.099°E
- Campus: Urban
- Colors: Red
- Website: www.aum.edu.kw

The American University of the Middle East (AUM) is a private university established in 2005 in Kuwait.

AUM has two colleges: the College of Engineering and Technology and the College of Business Administration, in addition to a Liberal Arts Department and an English Preparatory Program. Today, AUM has more than 11,000 enrolled students on a campus that stretches over an area of 261,190 square meters.

AUM is ranked as one of the Top Universities in Kuwait and ranked 21st in the Times Higher Education Arab University Rankings 2023. It also appeared in the Top 751-800 Universities globally in the QS World University Rankings 2022.

== Majors ==
The College of Engineering and Technology offers undergraduate programs in Architectural Engineering, Civil Engineering, Industrial Engineering, Computer Engineering, Electrical Engineering, Mechanical Engineering, and Chemical Engineering. In addition to two technology programs: Information System and Technology, and Telecommunications and Networking Technology.

The College of Business Administration offers undergraduate degree programs in Accounting and Business Administration with four concentrations: Finance, Management Information System, Marketing, and Human Resource Management), as well as a graduate program in business administration (MBA).

== Accreditations ==
The Private Universities Council of Kuwait (PUC) institutionally accredits AUM.

University rankings

Global – Overall
- QS World: =563 (2026)

Six of the programs offered by the College of Engineering and Technology are accredited by ABET, which is the global accreditor of college and university programs in applied and natural science, computing, engineering, and engineering technology. The Engineering Accreditation Commission of ABET has accredited B.Sc. programs in Chemical Engineering, Computer Engineering, Electrical Engineering, Mechanical Engineering, and Industrial Engineering. The Computing Accreditation Commission of ABET has accredited the Telecommunications and Networking Technology (TNT) program.

AUM's College of Business Administration is accredited by AACSB International, the Association to Advance Collegiate Schools of Business. AACSB is the longest-serving global accrediting body for business schools, and the world's largest business education network connecting learners, educators, and businesses worldwide.

== Athletics ==
The Sports Center at AUM includes indoor and outdoor sporting facilities, such as a professional football field, four fully equipped gyms, multi-sports halls, and basketball and tennis courts.

AUM has 11 sports teams consisting of around 120 students representing the university annually in local and international competitions.

The achievements obtained by the AUM sports teams in 2019 include the following:

- Female table tennis
- Female squash
- Female basketball
- Male basketball
- Male football
- Male volleyball
- Male swimming championships

In addition, the football team has won undefeated the EUROIJADA tournament that took place in Germany.

== Notable alumni ==
- Bader Al-Fadhel, Kuwaiti football player
- Abdulwahab Al-Awadi, Kuwaiti football player
- Hamad Al-Qallaf, Kuwaiti football player
- Fatemah Alzelzela, Kuwaiti electrical engineer and environmental advocate

== Campus ==
AUM campus extends over an area of 261,190 square meters and comprises green open spaces and modernly designed buildings that include: the College of Business Administration, the College of Engineering and Technology, a Library, a Sports Center, a Cultural Center, a Career Development and Recruitment Center, a Research and Innovation Center, and a Business and Innovation Center.

The campus also includes an outdoor amphitheater, fountain lakes, cafeterias and restaurants, a multi-story parking complex, and a wide range of high-tech labs and facilities. Other student support and learning services and facilities available at the university include more than 55 laboratories, a Tutoring Center, an Academic Advancement Center, and a Writing Lab.

== Faculty ==
There are over 700 faculty members & staff at AUM coming from around 62 nationalities.

== See also ==
- List of universities in Kuwait
