= Julien Ngoy =

Belgian footballer

Personal information
- Full name: Fontaine Ndanu Julien Mutale Ngoy Bin Cibambi
- Date of birth: 2 November 1997 (age 29)
- Place of birth: Antwerp, Belgium
- Height: 1.85 m (6 ft 1 in)
- Position: Forward

Team information
- Current team: AEL
- Number: 7

Youth career
- 2010–2011: Anderlecht
- 2011–2013: Club Brugge
- 2013: NSeth Academy
- 2013–2016: Stoke City

Senior career*
Years	Team	Apps	(Gls)
2016–2020	Stoke City	7	(0)
2018	→ Walsall (loan)	13	(3)
2018–2019	→ Grasshoppers (loan)	22	(5)
2020–2022	Eupen	56	(10)
2022–2025	Mechelen	37	(5)
2023–2024	→ Kasımpaşa (loan)	24	(2)
2025–2026	Al-Arabi	2	(1)
2026–	AEL	3	(0)

International career
2013	Belgium U16	3	(1)
2013	Belgium U17	3	(0)
2017–2018	Belgium U21	5	(1)
- * Club domestic league appearances and goals as of 14 June 2026

Fontaine Ndanu Julien Mutale Ngoy Bin Cibambi (born 2 November 1997), known as Julien Ngoy, is a Belgian professional footballer who plays as a forward for Greek Super League club AEL.

== Club career ==
=== Stoke City ===
Ngoy was born in Antwerp and began his football career playing in the youth team at Anderlecht up to the age of 14, he then spent two years with Club Brugge where his was top scorer of the under-16 team. In 2013, Ngoy decided to quit Brugge and join the NSeth Football Academy where he impressed the director, Nkandu Ntondo, who described him as the best talent he has seen at his academy. In the summer of 2013, Ngoy signed with English club Stoke City of the Premier League. In April 2014, he won the Generation Adidas Cup with Stoke City U17s.

Ngoy made his professional debut for Stoke in a 3–1 Premier League defeat at Arsenal on 10 December 2016. He made a total of six substitute appearances for Stoke in 2016–17. Ngoy was named as the Premier League 2 Player of the Month for March 2017. On 31 January 2018, Ngoy joined League One club Walsall on loan until the end of the 2017–18 season. He played 13 times for the Saddlers scoring three goals as they successfully avoided relegation.

On 29 August 2018, Ngoy joined Swiss Super League side Grasshoppers on loan until the end of the 2018–19 season. He was handed the number 20 shirt by the club. Ngoy played 23 times for Grasshoppers, scoring five goals in what was a traumatic season for the club who suffered relegation for the first time in 68 years and had a number of matches suspended due to fan protests. Ngoy struggled for game time in 2019–20, making only two brief substitute appearances.

=== Belgium ===
Ngoy joined Belgian First Division A side Eupen on 8 August 2020 on a two-year contract.

On 4 July 2022, Ngoy signed a three-year contract with Mechelen.

On 11 September 2023, Ngoy was loaned to Kasımpaşa in Turkey, going on to help them to a fifth-place finish in the 2023–24 Süper Lig season, their joint-highest placing ever.

== International career ==
He was a youth international for Belgium.

== Personal life ==
Ngoy was born in Belgium and is of Congolese descent.

== Career statistics ==
As of match played 9 February 2024

Appearances and goals by club, season and competition
Club	Season	League			Cup		League Cup		Other		Total	
Club	Season	Division	Apps	Goals	Apps	Goals	Apps	Goals	Apps	Goals	Apps	Goals
Stoke City U23	2016–17	—	—		—		—		3 (Note: Appearances in EFL Trophy)	0	3	0
Stoke City U23	2017–18	—	—		—		—		1	0	1	0
Stoke City U23	Total		—		—		—		4	0	4	0
Stoke City	2016–17	Premier League	5	0	1	0	0	0	—		6	0
Stoke City	2017–18	Premier League	1	0	0	0	0	0	—		1	0
Stoke City	2018–19	EFL Championship	0	0	0	0	0	0	—		0	0
Stoke City	2019–20	EFL Championship	1	0	1	0	0	0	—		2	0
Stoke City	Total		7	0	2	0	0	0	—		9	0
Walsall (loan)	2017–18	League One	13	3	0	0	0	0	—		13	3
Grasshoppers (loan)	2018–19	Swiss Super League	22	5	1	0	—		—		23	5
Eupen	2020–21	Belgian First Division A	32	6	3	0	—		—		35	6
Eupen	2021–22	Belgian First Division A	24	4	5	1	—		—		29	5
Eupen	Total		56	10	8	1	—		—		64	11
Mechelen	2022–23	Belgian Pro League	26	5	3	0	—		—		29	5
Mechelen	2023–24	Belgian Pro League	3	0	0	0	—		1 (Note: Appearance in 2023 Belgian Super Cup)	0	4	0
Mechelen	Total		29	5	3	0	—		1	0	33	5
Kasımpaşa (loan)	2023–24	Süper Lig	18	1	1	0	—		—		19	1
Al-Arabi	2025-26	Kuwaiti Premier League	2	1	0	0	0	0	1 (Note: Appearance in AFC Challenge League)	1	3	2
Career total			147	25	14	1	0	0	6	1	167	27

== Honours ==
Individual

- Premier League 2 — Player of the Month: March 2017
