= Fatemah Alzelzela =

Kuwaiti environmental advocate

Fatemah Alzelzela (Arabic: فاطمة الزلزلة) is a Kuwaiti electrical engineer and environmental advocate who co-founded a non-profit organization that recycles rubbish.

== Biography ==
Alzelzela was born in Kuwait. She was educated at the Maria Coptic School in Zahra then studied electrical engineering at the American University of the Middle East in Egaila, Kuwait. Whilst studying, she won first place in the projects and innovation competition We Unite 2018.

She founded the non-profit initiative Eco Star in early 2019, which encourages individuals and companies in Kuwait to hand in their waste products such as paper, plastic and metal in exchange for seeds, plants and trees. By the end of 2020, Eco Star had recycled three and a half tons of plastic, 10 tonnes of paper and 120 tonnes of metal. Alzelzela's company also raises awareness about recycling, threats to the environment and how young people can act for nature in local schools.

In 2020, Alelzela was recognized by the United Nations Environment Programme for her work highlighting the environmental importance and economic value of recycling in Kuwait and was named as one of the seven Young Champions of the Earth and the Regional Winner for West Asia.

In 2021, she spoke as part of a discussion panel titled "Intersection of Gender and Climate: Amplifying Impact Through Youth Actions" at the Civil Society Youth-Led Briefing.

In 2022 Alzelzela was interviewed by British Vogue, saying that "Resource security, environmental health and climate change are changing our lives, [but] don’t lose hope – we still can face it. Help, educate and empower youth to become future leaders and make sure to leave them a liveable Earth."
