= Hassan Al-Enezi =

Kuwaiti footballer (born 2000)

Personal information
- Full name: Hassan Hamdan Al-Enzei
- Date of birth: 1 September 2000 (age 26)
- Place of birth: Kuwait
- Height: 1.84 m (6 ft 0 in)
- Position: Center back

Team information
- Current team: Kuwait SC
- Number: 44

Youth career
- 2012-2019: Al-Arabi

Senior career*
Years	Team	Apps	(Gls)
2019–2025	Al-Arabi	94	(1)
2025–2026	Al-Ahli	9	(0)
2026–	Kuwait SC	0	(0)

International career^{‡}
2023–	Kuwait	28	(2)
- * Club domestic league appearances and goals as of 30 October 2025 ‡ National team caps and goals as of 5 June 2025

Hassan Hamdan Al-Enezi (Arabic: حسن حمدان العنزي; born 1 September 2000) is a Kuwaiti professional footballer who plays as a center back for Kuwaiti Premier League club Kuwait SC and the Kuwait national football team.

== Club career ==
=== Al-Arabi ===
Through the youth system Hassan has been one of the dominant defending players in Kuwait as when he was called up to the first team in the 2019-20 as a rotational player within the squad.

Five seasons in with multiple sideline injuries throughout 2024-25 season and 26th Gulf Cup still was able to perform on top level.

Hamdan signed a five-year contract extension with Al-Arabi. However, under FIFA's transfer regulations concerning the protected period, he became eligible to unilaterally terminate his contract after completing three seasons, as he was under the age of 28, where issues accrued as the player used his extension as a portal way to release himself from his contract Following his departure, Al-Arabi announced their intention to file a legal complaint against both Hamdan and Al-Ahli.

=== Al-Ahli ===
On 16 July, Jordanian Pro League club Al-Ahli announced the signing of Hamdan. He becomes the first Kuwaiti and second Gulf player to play in the league.

On April 2, 2026 Hassan was suspended 4 months by FIFA after breaching his contract with Al-Arabi, also paying a fine and reimbursing the clubs.

== International career ==
Hassan Made his debut in 25th Arabian Gulf Cup and 2023 SAFF Championship where he scored a goal against Bangladesh. Became a regular starter throughout 2026 World Cup qualifiers.

== Career statistics ==
=== Club ===
As of 12 February 2026

Appearances and goals by club, season and competition
Club	Season	League			Cup		Continental		Other (Note: All appearance(s) in Kuwait Crown Prince Cup, Kuwait Super Cup, Kuwait Federation Cup, Jordan Shield Cup)		Total	
Club	Season	Division	Apps	Goals	Apps	Goals	Apps	Goals	Apps	Goals	Apps	Goals
Al-Arabi	2019–20	KPL	3	0	1	0	—		0	0	4	0
Al-Arabi	2020–21	KPL	14	0	2	0	—		4	0	20	0
Al-Arabi	2021–22	KPL	20	1	3	0	3 (Note: All appearance(s) in AFC Cup)	0	4	0	30	1
Al-Arabi	2022–23	KPL	21	0	3	0	—		5	0	29	0
Al-Arabi	2023–24	KPL	22	0	3	0	3 (Note: All appearance(s) in AFC Cup)	0	3	0	30	0
Al-Arabi	2024–25	KPL	14	0	3	0	7 (Note: All appearance(s) in AFC Challenge League)	0	3	0	27	0
Total			94	1	15	0	13	0	19	0	141	1
Al-Ahli	2025-26	JPL	9	0	0	0	0	0	2	0	11	0
Career total			103	1	15	0	13	0	21	0	152	1

=== International ===
As of match played 5 June 2025

National team	Year	Apps	Goals
Kuwait	2022	2	0
Kuwait	2023	11	1
Kuwait	2024	11	0
Kuwait	2025	4	1
Total		28	2

== Honours ==
=== Al-Arabi ===
- Kuwait Premier League: 2020-21
- Kuwait Emir Cup: 2019-20
- Kuwait Crown Prince Cup: 2021-22, 2022-23
- Kuwait Super Cup: 2021

=== Kuwait ===
- SAFF Championship (Runner Up): 2023
