= Abdullah Al-Ayoub =

Kuwaiti footballer (born 2006)

Personal information
- Full name: Abdullah Al-Ayoub
- Date of birth: 5 February 2006 (age 20)
- Place of birth: Kuwait
- Height: 1.82 m (6 ft 0 in)
- Position: Goalkeeper

Team information
- Current team: Al-Salmiya
- Number: 35

Youth career
- 2013–2025: Al-Arabi

Senior career*
Years	Team	Apps	(Gls)
2025–2026	Al-Arabi	3	(0)
2026–	Al-Salmiya	0	(0)

International career^{‡}
2022–2024	Kuwait U17	14	(3)
2024–	Kuwait U20	5	(0)
2026–	Kuwait U23	0	(0)
- * Club domestic league appearances and goals as of 14 June 2026 ‡ National team caps and goals as of 14 June 2026

Abdullah Al-Ayoub (born 5 February 2006) is a Kuwaiti professional footballer who plays as a goalkeeper for Kuwait Premier League club Al-Salmiya and the Kuwait national team.

== Club career ==
=== Al-Arabi ===
Al-Ayoub signed a three-year first team contract at the beginning on the 2025–26 season, where he made his senior debut coming on for Ahmed Dashti after receiving a red card and keeping a clean sheet in the 2025–26 Kuwaiti Premier League against Kazma and was a substitute Goalkeeper in the 2025–26 AFC Challenge League later released at the end of the season after winning the 2025–26 Kuwait Crown Prince Cup.

=== Al-Salmiya ===
After his release, he immediately signed a three-year first team contract with Al-Salmiya on 18 July 2026.

== International career ==
On 31 May 2026, he was selected for the initial roster for the Kuwait Olympic National team, participating in the 2026 Asian Games.

== Career statistics ==
=== Club ===
As of 30 June 2026

Appearances and goals by club, season and competition
Club	Season	League			Cup		Continental		Other (Note: All appearance(s) in Kuwait Crown Prince Cup, Kuwait Super Cup)		Total	
Club	Season	Division	Apps	Goals	Apps	Goals	Apps	Goals	Apps	Goals	Apps	Goals
Al-Arabi	2025–26	KPL	3	0	0	0	0 (Note: All appearance(s) in AFC Challenge League)	0	0	0	3	0
Career total			3	0	0	0	0	0	0	0	3	0

== Honours ==
=== Al-Arabi ===
- Kuwait Crown Prince Cup: 2025-26
