= Hassimi Fadiga =

French footballer

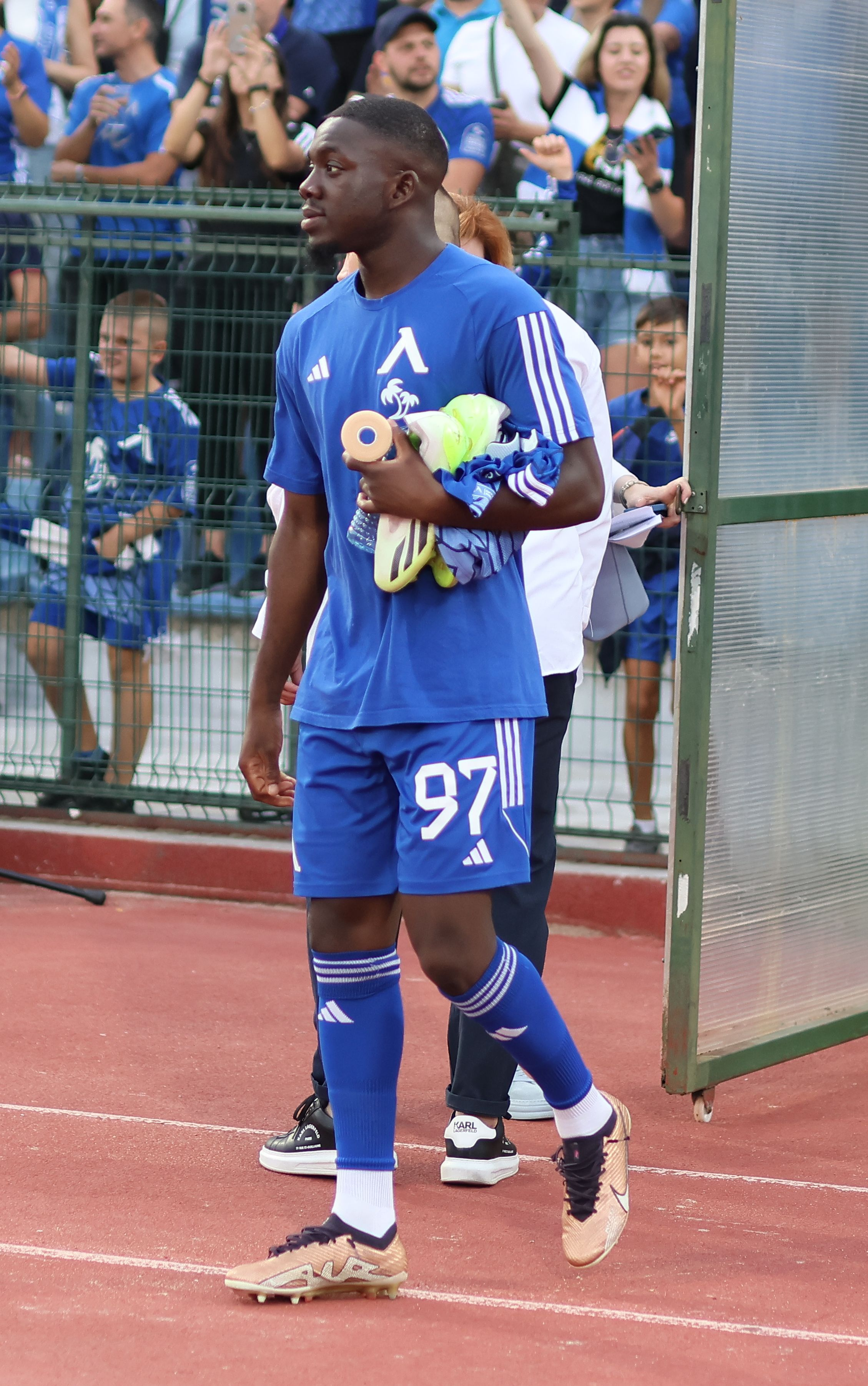

Personal information
- Date of birth: 19 April 1997 (age 29)
- Place of birth: Bourges, France
- Height: 1.78 m (5 ft 10 in)
- Positions: Midfielder; winger

Team information
- Current team: Al-Jandal

Youth career
- 2005–2013: Châtellerault
- 2013–2014: Poitiers
- 2014–2016: Châtellerault

Senior career*
Years	Team	Apps	(Gls)
2016–2018	Châtellerault	7	(0)
2018–2019	Montmorillon	25	(4)
2019–2020	Aviron Bayonnais	14	(0)
2020–2022	Le Puy	20	(7)
2022–2023	Le Mans	51	(3)
2023–2025	Levski Sofia	43	(6)
2025–2026	Al-Arabi	14	(6)
2026–	Al-Jandal	0	(0)
- * Club domestic league appearances and goals as of 22:46, 6 June 2026

Hassimi Fadiga (born 19 April 1997) is a French professional footballer who plays as a midfielder and winger for Saudi First Division League team Al-Jandal.

== Awards ==
Goal of the year in Bulgarian football - 2023

== Career statistics ==
=== Club ===
As of 6 June 2026

Appearances and goals by club, season and competition
Club	Season	League			Cup		Continental		Other		Total	
Club	Season	Division	Apps	Goals	Apps	Goals	Apps	Goals	Apps	Goals	Apps	Goals
Châtellerault	2016–17	Régional 1	6	0	0	0	0	0	0	0	6	0
Châtellerault	2017–18	Régional 1	1	0	0	0	0	0	0	0	1	0
Châtellerault	Total		7	0	0	0	0	0	0	0	7	0
Montmorillon	2018–19	National 3	25	4	0	0	0	0	0	0	25	4
Aviron Bayonnais	2019–20	National 3	14	0	2	0	0	0	0	0	16	0
Aviron Bayonnais	Total		39	4	2	0	0	0	0	0	41	4
Le Puy	2020–21	National 2	6	1	5	0	0	0	0	0	11	1
Le Puy	2021–22	National 2	14	6	1	0	0	0	0	0	15	6
Le Mans	2021–22	National	17	0	0	0	0	0	0	0	17	0
Le Mans	2022–23	National	34	3	1	0	0	0	0	0	35	3
Le Mans	Total		71	10	7	0	0	0	0	0	78	10
Levski Sofia	2023–24	First League	28	2	2	0	4	1	0	0	34	3
Levski Sofia	2024–25	First League	15	4	2	0	0	0	0	0	17	4
Levski Sofia	Total		43	6	4	0	4	1	0	0	51	7
Al-Arabi	2025-26	Kuwaiti Premier League	14	6	2	1	4 (Note: All appearance(s) in AFC Challenge League)	0	3	1	23	8
Career total			174	26	15	1	8	1	4	1	205	28
