= Bader Al-Fadhel =

Kuwaiti footballer

Personal information
- Full name: Bader Tarek Abdulrahman Al-Fadhel
- Date of birth: 22 April 1997 (age 29)
- Place of birth: Kuwait
- Height: 1.81 m (5 ft 11 in)
- Position: Attacking midfielder

Team information
- Current team: Al-Arabi
- Number: 7

Youth career
- 2006-2019: Al-Arabi

Senior career*
Years	Team	Apps	(Gls)
2016–2026	Al-Arabi	200	(25)
2022	→ Al-Shabab (loan)	13	(2)

International career^{‡}
2015-2019	Kuwait U-20	7	(2)
2018-2020	Kuwait U-23	8	(2)
2018–	Kuwait	14	(2)
- * Club domestic league appearances and goals as of 3 May 2025 ‡ National team caps and goals as of 6 October 2025

Bader Al-Fadhel (born 22 April 1997) is a Kuwaiti professional footballer who plays as an attacking midfielder for Al-Arabi and Kuwait national football team.

== Club career ==
=== Al-Arabi ===
==== 2016-2021 ====
Bader made his debut for the first team mainly as a winger as he was called up at the age of 19 after signing his first team contract.

During his time with the first team, Bader played for the under 19's and under 21's as a substitute. Eventually he became a rotational player and played a role in winning the Emir Cup in 2020 and the 2020-21 League Championship.

=== Al-Shabab ===
==== 2021-22 ====
In the 2021–22 season Bader was not given much play time, in the January transfer window after winning Crown Prince Cup and Super Cup he was loaned to Al-Shabab on a short-term deal from February till July.

=== Return to Al-Arabi ===
==== 2023- Present ====
Upon making his return coming on as a substitute scoring against Al-Riffa SC in the 2022 AFC Cup. Moving from that point Bader became a significant rotational player, and kept the dominant midfielder role.

At the end of the 2023–24 season new came out that Bader would not join the club's preseason tour due to his late salary payments from the previous season and was considered terminating his contract amid legal actions. with soon rejoin the team after agreeing to continue.

== International career ==
Bader made his debut against Jordan when he was called up in the 2018 March international window. Scored his first goal against the Philippines on March 24, 2023, alongside his second goal 4 days later against Tajikistan. After a two year of being left out of the national team squad he was called up again in September camp to play against Syria

== Personal life ==
Bader studied his bachelor's degree in Mechanical Engineering at the American University of the Middle East, where he represented AUM's Sports division in the university leagues, continued his education of master's degree in Marketing in Gulf University for Science and Technology in a sports scholarship.

== International goals ==
Scores and results list Kuwait's goal tally first.

No.	Date	Venue	Opponent	Score	Result	Competition
1.	24 March 2023	Jaber Al-Ahmad International Stadium, Kuwait	Philippines	1–0	2–0	Friendly
1.	28 March 2023	Jaber Al-Ahmad International Stadium, Kuwait	Tajikistan	1–0	2–1	Friendly

== Honours ==
=== Al-Arabi ===
- Kuwaiti Premier League: 1

2020–21

- Kuwait Emir Cup: 1

2019–20

- Kuwait Crown Prince Cup: 3

2021–22, 2022–23, 2025–26

- Kuwait Super Cup: 1

2021

=== Individual ===
- Kuwaiti Premier League Player of the Month: 1

February 2018
