= Mohammed Khaled =

Kuwaiti footballer (born 1996)

خالد ماجد محمد رشيد
Personal information
- Full name: خالد ماجد محمد رشيد
- Date of birth: 17 October 1984 (age 42)
- Place of birth: Kuwait
- Height: 1.79 m (5 ft 10 in)
- Position: Center back

Team information
- Current team: معتزل
- Number: معتزل

Youth career
- 2009-2014: Qadsia

Senior career*
| Years | Team | Apps | (Gls) |
| 2014–2016 | Qadsia | 20 | (1) |
| 2016–2022 | Al-Nasr | 108 | (4) |
| 2022–2024 | Kazma | 35 | (2) |
| 2024– | Al-Arabi | 18 | (1) |

International career^{‡}
| 2015-2018 | Kuwait U-23 | 11 | (0) |
| 2018- | Kuwait | 10 | (0) |
- * Club domestic league appearances and goals as of 5 June 2025 ‡ National team caps and goals as of 6 June 2026

Mohammad Khaled Al-Nassar; (born 24 May 1996) is a Kuwaiti professional footballer who plays as a center back for Al-Arabi and Kuwait national football team.

== Club career ==
=== Qadsia ===
Mohammad grew up through the youth system of Qadsia, making his debut at 18 for the club winning the Kuwaiti Premier League and Kuwait Emir Cup. He was released in June 2016.

=== Al-Nasr ===
following his signing with Al-Nasr he became a starter for the club featuring in all their matches for 6 straight seasons winning the club their first title in 12 years and their first Cup the Kuwait Federation Cup.

=== Kazma ===
Signed with Kazma on a 2-year deal but was injury prone in his last season.

=== Al-Arabi ===
He signed a 2-year deal with Al-Arabi.

== International career ==
Mohammad made his debut in a friendly against Australia. Became a regular starter throughout 2026 World Cup qualifiers in 2025 and featured in 2023 SAFF Championship.

== Honours ==
=== Qadsia ===
- Kuwait Premier League: 2015–16
- Kuwait Emir Cup: 2014-15

=== Al-Nasr ===
- Kuwait Federation Cup: 2021-22

=== Kuwait ===
- SAFF Championship (Runner Up): 2023
