= Abdulrahman Karam =

Kuwaiti footballer (born 2001)

Personal information
- Full name: Abdulrahman Faisal Sharhan Karam
- Date of birth: 15 March 2001 (age 25)
- Place of birth: Kuwait
- Height: 1.76 m (5 ft 9 in)
- Positions: Right winger; right back

Team information
- Current team: Al-Yarmouk
- Number: 19

Youth career
- 2015-2021: Kazma
- 2021-2022: Al-Arabi

Senior career*
Years	Team	Apps	(Gls)
2019–2021	Kazma	11	(0)
2021–2026	Al-Arabi	42	(5)
2026–	Al-Yarmouk	0	(0)

International career^{‡}
2018-2019	Kuwait U-20	9	(2)
2019-2024	Kuwait U-23	14	(2)
2023-	Kuwait	1	(0)
- * Club domestic league appearances and goals as of 3 May 2025 ‡ National team caps and goals as of 31 December 2024

Abdulrahman Karam (born 15 March 2001) is a Kuwaiti professional soccer player who plays as a Forward for Al-Yarmouk and Kuwait national football team.

== Club career ==
=== Kazma ===
Abdulrahman made his debut for Kazma as a Right Winger in 2019–20, playing for both first team and U-21's. after 2 years his contract expired and refused to resign.

=== Al-Arabi ===
in 2021 he signed a 5-year deal with Al-Arabi alongside Ali Abdul Rasul. he was mainly played as Right Back and changing roles throughout the season, Tore his ACL in the 2023–24 season. He played in both AFC Cup and AFC Challenge League.

=== Al-Yarmouk ===
On 30 June 2026, Karam joined Al-Yarmouk

== National career ==
He was first called up in 2023 for friendlies against the Philippines on 24 March 2023.

== Honours ==
=== Al-Arabi ===
- Kuwait Crown Prince Cup: 2021–22, 2022–23, 2025-26
- Kuwait Super Cup: 2021
