= Abdullah Ammar =

Kuwaiti footballer (born 1999)

Personal information
- Full name: Abdullah Ammar Mohammad Abdullah Al-Buloushi
- Date of birth: 8 May 1998 (age 28)
- Place of birth: Kuwait
- Height: 1.76 m (5 ft 9 in)
- Position: Right back

Team information
- Current team: Al-Arabi
- Number: 3

Youth career
- 2012-2017: Al-Arabi

Senior career*
Years	Team	Apps	(Gls)
2016–	Al-Arabi	100	(1)

International career^{‡}
2017-2018	Kuwait U-20	7	(0)
2018-2020	Kuwait U-23	11	(0)
2021-	Kuwait	8	(2)
- * Club domestic league appearances and goals as of 3 May 2025 ‡ National team caps and goals as of 31 December 2024

Abdullah Ammar (born 8 May 1998) is a Kuwaiti professional footballer who plays as a Right Back for Al-Arabi and Kuwait.

== Club career ==
Abdullah made his debut in the 2016–2017 season coming from Al-Arabi youth system. being a substitute mostly throughout his first few seasons. playing regularly starting in the 2022 AFC Cup. he has been instrumental in Al-Arabi's strong domestic performances, helping the club secure multiple titles in the Kuwait Premier League and a Crown Prince Cup and Emir Cup known for his solid defensive presence.

t the end of the 2023–24 season new came out that Abduullah would not join the club's preseason tour due to his late salary payments from the previous season and was considered terminating his contract amid legal actions. with soon rejoin the team after agreeing to continue.

== International career ==
made his debut for the senior Kuwait national team on June 12, 2023, in a friendly where Kuwait beat Zambia 3–0. His first official cap came shortly after, on June 21, 2023, during the SAFF Championship match against Nepal, where he helped secure a 3–1 victory, also played the 2026 World Cup qualifiers.

== International goals ==
Scores and results list Kuwait's goal tally first.

No.	Date	Venue	Opponent	Score	Result	Competition
1.	1 July 2023	Sree Kanteerava Stadium, India	Bangladesh	1–1	1–0	2023 SAFF Championship
1.	11 September 2023	The Sevens Stadium, Dubai	Kyrgyzstan	1–3	1–1	Friendly

== Honours ==
=== Al-Arabi ===
- Kuwaiti Premier League: 1

2020–21

- Kuwait Emir Cup: 1

2019–20

- Kuwait Crown Prince Cup: 2

2021–22, 2022–23

- Kuwait Super Cup: 1

2021
