= Ali Porusaniei =

Kuwaiti footballer

Personal information
- Full name: Ali Aziz Porusaniei
- Date of birth: 11 March 2004 (age 22)
- Place of birth: Kuwait
- Height: 1.81 m (5 ft 11 in)
- Position: Midfielder

Team information
- Current team: Al-Arabi
- Number: 21

Youth career
- 2017–2024: Al-Arabi

Senior career*
Years	Team	Apps	(Gls)
2022–	Al-Arabi	35	(1)
- * Club domestic league appearances and goals as of 3 May 2025

Ali Aziz Porusaniei; (born 11 March 2004) is an Iranian professional footballer who plays as a Midfielder for Al-Arabi.

== Club career ==
Ali born in Kuwait, joined Al-Arabi youth system, making his debut in the 2022–23 season on 15 September 2022 against Al-Tadamun. where he won the Crown Prince Cup. Following season Ali became a regular rotational player where he differed from his regular position taking a defensive position to a more crucial role. He played his first AFC Cup match against in the 2023 AFC Cup against Al-Riffa.

== Career statistics ==
As of 31 June 2026

Appearances and goals by club, season and competition
Club	Season	League			Cup		Continental		Other (Note: All appearance(s) in Kuwait Crown Prince Cup, Kuwait Super Cup)		Total	
Club	Season	Division	Apps	Goals	Apps	Goals	Apps	Goals	Apps	Goals	Apps	Goals
Al-Arabi	2022–23	KPL	4	0	1	0	—		0	0	5	0
Al-Arabi	2023–24	KPL	12	0	2	0	2 (Note: All appearance(s) in AFC Cup)	0	2	0	18	0
Al-Arabi	2024–25	KPL	19	1	3	1	7 (Note: All appearance(s) in AFC Challenge League)	0	4	0	33	2
Al-Arabi	2025–26	KPL	12	2	2	0	4 (Note: All appearance(s) in AFC Challenge League)	0	4	0	22	2
Career total			47	3	8	1	13	0	10	0	78	4
