= Hamad Al-Qallaf =

Kuwaiti footballer (born 1999)

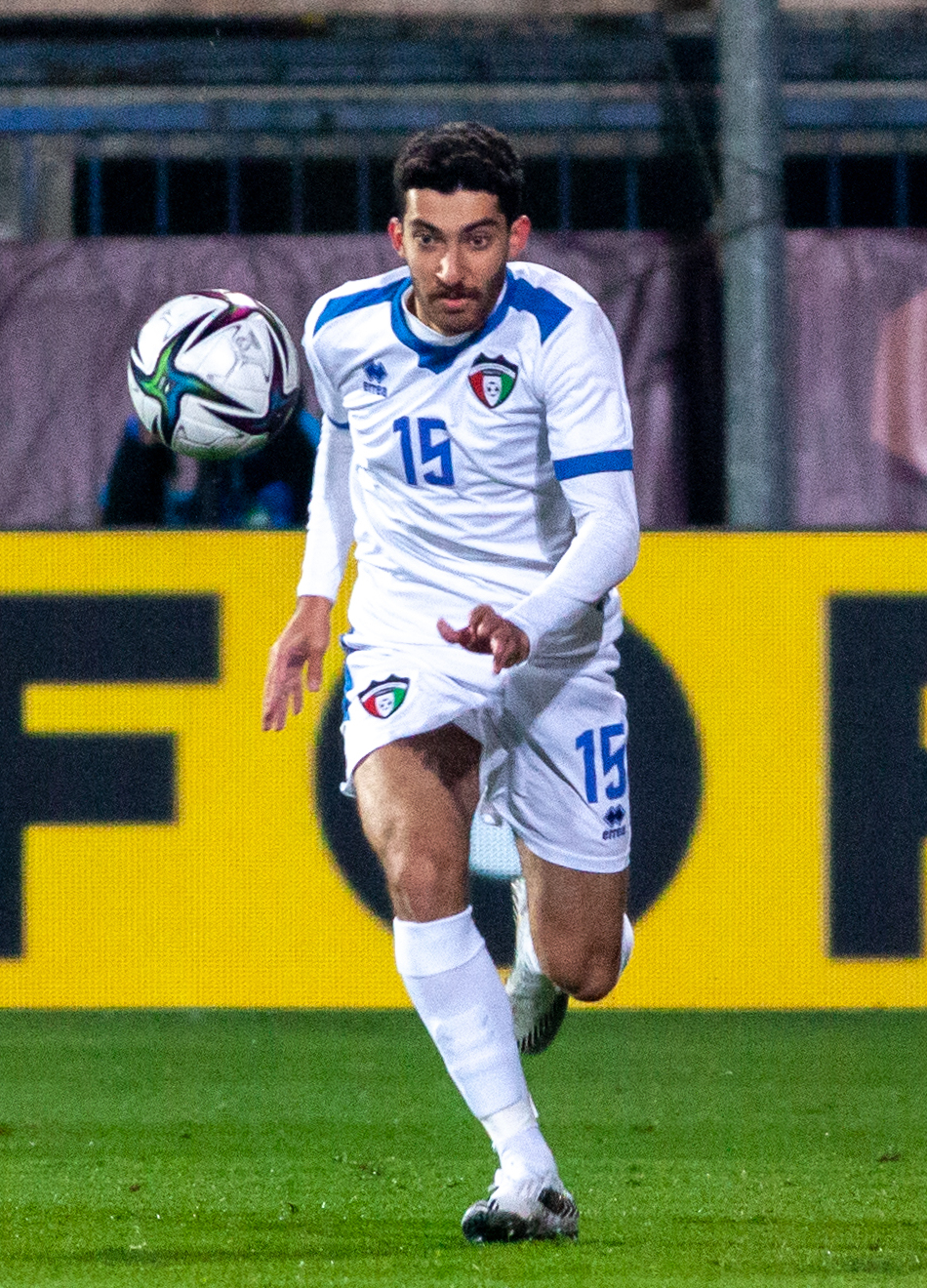
- Al Qallaf with Kuwait national team in 2021

Personal information
- Full name: Hamad Talal Adel Khalil Al-Qallaf
- Date of birth: 4 December 1999 (age 26)
- Place of birth: Kuwait
- Height: 1.71 m (5 ft 7 in)
- Position: Left back

Team information
- Current team: Al-Arabi
- Number: 15

Youth career
- 2015-2020: Al-Salmiya

Senior career*
Years	Team	Apps	(Gls)
2019–2023	Al-Salmiya	40	(0)
2023–	Al-Arabi	59	(0)

International career^{‡}
2018-2019	Kuwait U-20	4	(0)
2019-2022	Kuwait U-23	8	(0)
2021–	Kuwait	26	(0)
- * Club domestic league appearances and goals as of 3 May 2025 ‡ National team caps and goals as of 31 December 2024

Hamad Al-Qallaf (born 4 December 1999) is a Kuwaiti professional soccer player who plays as a Left back for Al-Arabi and Kuwait national football team.

== Club career ==
=== Al-Salmiyah ===
==== 2019-2023 ====
Through the youth system Hassan has been one of the dominant defending players in Kuwait as when he was called up to the first team in the 2019-20 as a rotational player within the squad. where he played the 2022 Kuwait Emir Cup final and lost to Qadsia SC. Hamad, alongside a lot of local players suffered from late salary payments in summer of 2022 but the issue was soon dealt with

=== Al-Arabi ===
==== 2023-2025 ====
On July 13, 2023 Hamad signed for Al-Arabi after failing a year prior when he requested to get released. gaining fame for his thin but fast reflections throughout the season Hamad became a starting player for both club and national team. On July of 2025 he was suspended 1 year for Anti-Doping drug test.

== National career ==
Hamad made his first call up in September 2020 and debut at the age of 20 for Kuwait in 2021 in January against a 1-0 defeat to Palestine where he played 8 minutes. was featured in 25th Arabian Gulf Cup and 2023 SAFF Championship squads and played in 2026 World Cup qualifiers.

== Career statistics ==
=== Club ===
As of 21 May 2025

Appearances and goals by club, season and competition
Club	Season	League			Cup		Continental		Other (Note: All appearance(s) in Kuwait Crown Prince Cup, Kuwait Super Cup, Kuwait Federation Cup)		Total	
Club	Season	Division	Apps	Goals	Apps	Goals	Apps	Goals	Apps	Goals	Apps	Goals
Al-Salmiya	2019–20	KPL	3	0	1	0	—		0	0	4	0
Al-Salmiya	2020–21	KPL	16	0	2	0	—		6	0	24	0
Al-Salmiya	2021–22	KPL	21	0	2	0	—		4	0	27	0
Al-Salmiya	2022–23	KPL	21	0	1	0	—		2	0	25	0
Al-Arabi	2023–24	KPL	20	0	2	0	4 (Note: All appearance(s) in AFC Cup)	0	3	0	27	0
Al-Arabi	2024–25	KPL	18	0	2	0	6 (Note: All appearance(s) in AFC Challenge League)	0	2	0	32	0
Career total			99	1	10	0	10	0	21	0	141	0

=== International ===
As of match played 5 June 2025

National team	Year	Apps	Goals
Kuwait	2021	11	0
Kuwait	2022	3	0
Kuwait	2023	10	0
Kuwait	2024	2	0
Kuwait	2025	0	0
Total		26	0
