= Abdulwahab Al-Awadi =

Kuwaiti footballer

Personal information
- Date of birth: 2 June 2002 (age 24)
- Place of birth: Kuwait
- Height: 1.70 m (5 ft 7 in)
- Position: Right back

Team information
- Current team: Al-Arabi
- Number: 25

Youth career
- 2015-2023: Al-Yarmouk

Senior career*
Years	Team	Apps	(Gls)
2022-2023	Al-Yarmouk	3	(0)
2023-	Al-Arabi	9	(0)

International career^{‡}
2021-2022	Kuwait U-20	9	(1)
2022-2025	Kuwait U-23	6	(0)
2025–	Kuwait	6	(0)
- * Club domestic league appearances and goals as of 3 May 2025 ‡ National team caps and goals as of 14 October 2025

Abdulwahab Al-Awadi (born 2 June 2002) is a Kuwaiti professional footballer who plays as a right-back for Al-Arabi and the Kuwait national football team.

== Club career ==
=== Al-Yarmouk ===
Abdulwahab Al-Awadi began his career in the youth division of Al-Yarmouk, primarily playing as a forward. He finished as the top scorer in the youth league. He also made appearances for the first team over two seasons, although with limited playing time. Al-Awadi was part of the squad that won the 2023–24 Kuwaiti Division One. His tenure with the club concluded as he signed mid season with Al-Arabi.

=== Al-Arabi ===
After signing with Al-Arabi a year earlier, Abdulwahab Al-Awadi made his debut in the 11th week of the 2024–25 Kuwaiti Premier League against Al-Tadamon, featuring in a new role as a right-back. He was named Player of the Week for his performance in the match. Over the course of the season, Al-Awadi became a regular substitute and went on to play in his first Crown Prince Cup final against Kuwait SC. In the 120th minute of the match, he conceded a penalty by fouling Marhoon, which resulted in a goal and a loss for Al-Arabi, with regular appearances in the AFC Challenge League.

== National career ==
After sparking success throughout the 2024-25 season, Abdulwahab was called up for the national team for 2026 World Cup qualifiers made his debut against South Korea, later was called up regularly for camps.

== Career statistics ==
=== Club ===
As of 12 September 2025

Appearances and goals by club, season and competition
Club	Season	League			Cup		Continental		Other (Note: All appearance(s) in Kuwait Crown Prince Cup, Kuwait Super Cup)		Total	
Club	Season	Division	Apps	Goals	Apps	Goals	Apps	Goals	Apps	Goals	Apps	Goals
Al-Yarmouk
Al-Yarmouk	2022–23	KD1	5	0	0	0	—		0	0	5	0
Al-Yarmouk	2023–24	KD1	3	0	0	0	—		0	0	3	0
Al-Arabi	2023-24	KPL	0	0	0	0	0 (Note: All appearance(s) in AFC Cup)	0	0	0	0	0
Al-Arabi	2024-25	KPL	8	0	2	0	2 (Note: All appearance(s) in AFC Challenge League)	0	4	0	16	0
Al-Arabi	2025–26	KPL	1	0	0	0	1 (Note: All appearance(s) in AFC Challenge League)	0	0	0	2	0
Career total			17	0	2	0	3	0	4	0	26	0

=== International ===
As of match played 14 October 2025

National team	Year	Apps	Goals
Kuwait	2025	6	0
Total		6	0

== Honours ==
=== Al-Yarmouk ===
- Kuwaiti Division One: 2023–24

=== Individual ===
- Kuwaiti Premier League POTW: 2024–25 W11
