= Abdullah Al-Garzaei =

Kuwaiti footballer

Personal information
- Full name: Abdullah Khalifa Al-Garzaei Al-Rashidi
- Date of birth: 18 September 2008 (age 18)
- Place of birth: Kuwait
- Height: 1.76 m (5 ft 9 in)
- Position: Midfielder

Team information
- Current team: Al-Kuwait
- Number: 88

Youth career
- 2020-: Al-Arabi

Senior career*
Years	Team	Apps	(Gls)
2025–2026	Al-Arabi	10	(1)
2026-	Al-Kuwait	1	(1)

International career^{‡}
2025–	Kuwait U-20	4	(0)
2025–	Kuwait U-23	3	(1)
2026–	Kuwait	1	(0)
- * Club domestic league appearances and goals as of 3 May 2026 ‡ National team caps and goals as of 6 June 2026

Abdullah Al-Garzaei Al-Rashidi (born 18 September 2008) is a Kuwaiti professional footballer who plays as a midfielder for Al-Arabi and the Kuwait national team.

== Club career ==
=== Al-Arabi ===
Made his debut coming on as a substitute in a 4-0 victory against Al-Jahra on November 4 202 5, made his first team start against Kuwait SC in the 2025–26 Crown Prince Final on 18th May 2026.

== International career ==
After staring success in 2025–26 Crown Prince Final, Abdullah was called up for the national team for a friendly against Thailand on 5 June 2026, debuting as a substitute in a 2-2 draw.

== Career statistics ==
=== Club ===
As of 6 June 2026

Appearances and goals by club, season and competition
Club	Season	League			Cup		Continental		Other (Note: All appearance(s) in Kuwait Crown Prince Cup, Kuwait Super Cup)		Total	
Club	Season	Division	Apps	Goals	Apps	Goals	Apps	Goals	Apps	Goals	Apps	Goals
Al-Arabi	2025-26	Kuwaiti Premier League	10	1	0	0	0 (Note: All appearance(s) in AFC Challenge League)	0	1	0	11	1
Career total			10	1	0	0	0	0	1	0	11	1

=== International ===
As of match played 6 June 2026

National team	Year	Apps	Goals
Kuwait	2026	1	0
Total		1	0

== Honours ==
=== Al-Arabi ===
- Kuwait Crown Prince Cup: 2025–26
