= Yousef Majed =

Kuwaiti footballer (born 2005)

Personal information
- Full name: Yousef Majed Al-Shlahi Al-Shammari
- Date of birth: 14 January 2005 (age 21)
- Place of birth: Kuwait
- Height: 1.70 m (5 ft 7 in)
- Position: Attacking midfielder

Team information
- Current team: Al-Arabi
- Number: 30

Youth career
- 2017–2020: Qadsia
- 2020–2023: Al-Arabi

Senior career*
Years	Team	Apps	(Gls)
2023–	Al-Arabi	14	(2)

International career^{‡}
2024	Kuwait U-20	7	(4)
2025–	Kuwait U-23	3	(0)
2024–	Kuwait	15	(1)
- * Club domestic league appearances and goals as of 3 May 2025 ‡ National team caps and goals as of 5 June 2026

Yousef Majed Al-Shlahi Al-Shammari (Arabic: يوسف ماجد; born 14 January 2005) is a Kuwaiti professional footballer who plays as an attacking midfielder for Kuwait Premier League club Al-Arabi and the Kuwait national team.

== Club career ==
Yousef Debuted in September 2023 and in his second game scored against kazma as a substitute scoring the fourth goal in a 4–0 victory in the 2023-24 Kuwaiti Premier League.

Following a sprouting season, the youngster continued his successful substitution run scoring the winning goal in Kuwaiti El Clásico in a 2–1 victory in the 2024-25 Kuwaiti Premier League which made him a prominent rotational player but was cut short due to an injury keeping him out 4 months in the 26th Arabian Gulf Cup, alongside a 3 match ban by the AFC following a red card in the AFC Challenge League

== International career ==
After sparking throughout the season Yousef was instantly called up to the national team for the 2026 World Cup qualifiers and being named Kuwaits rising future by FIFA and 26th Arabian Gulf Cup making his debut against Jordan and later on picked up an injury that would sideline him for 4 months against Qatar in the Arabian Gulf Cup.

== Career statistics ==
=== Club ===
As of 31 June 2026

Appearances and goals by club, season and competition
Club	Season	League			Cup		Continental		Other (Note: All appearance(s) in Kuwait Crown Prince Cup, Kuwait Super Cup)		Total	
Club	Season	Division	Apps	Goals	Apps	Goals	Apps	Goals	Apps	Goals	Apps	Goals
Al-Arabi	2023–24	KPL	6	1	1	0	—		0	0	7	1
Al-Arabi	2024–25	KPL	10	1	1	0	4 (Note: All appearance(s) in AFC Challenge League)	1	3	0	17	2
Al-Arabi	2025–26	KPL	17	2	1	0	4 (Note: All appearance(s) in AFC Challenge League)	1	2	1	25	4
Career total			33	4	3	0	8	1	5	1	50	7

=== International ===
As of match played 3 June 2026

National team	Year	Apps	Goals
Kuwait	2024	9	0
Kuwait	2025	5	0
Kuwait	2026	1	1
Total		15	1

== International goals ==
Scores and results list Kuwait's goal tally first.

No.	Date	Venue	Opponent	Score	Result	Competition
1.	5 June 2026	True BG Stadium, Pathum Thani, Thailand	Thailand	1–2	2–2	Friendly
