= Kamil Al-Aswad =

Bahraini footballer

Personal information
- Full name: Kamil Hasan Abdulla Ahmed Hasan Al-Aswad
- Date of birth: 8 April 1994 (age 32)
- Place of birth: Manama, Bahrain
- Height: 1.68 m (5 ft 6 in)
- Position: Midfielder

Team information
- Current team: Al-Arabi
- Number: 93

Senior career*
Years	Team	Apps	(Gls)
2013–2024	Al-Riffa		
2024-2026	Al-Khaldiya		
2025	Al-Arabi (loan)	12	(2)
2026	Al-Arabi	10	(1)

International career^{‡}
2015–	Bahrain	112	(14)
Medal record
Men's football
Representing Bahrain
Arabian Gulf Cup
Winner	2019 Qatar
Winner	2024 Kuwait
- * Club domestic league appearances and goals ‡ National team caps and goals as of 14 November 2026 (UTC)

Kamil Hasan Abdulla Ahmed Hasan Al-Aswad, often known as "Komail" (Arabic: كَمِيل حَسَن عَبْد الله أَحْمَد حَسَن الْأَسْوَد; born 8 April 1994), is a Bahraini professional footballer who plays for Al-Arabi and the Bahrain national team.

== Career statistics ==
As of 19 June 2025

Appearances and goals by club, season and competition
Club	Season	League			Cup		Continental		Other (Note: All appearance(s) in Bahrain Kings Cup, Kuwait Crown Prince Cup, Kuwait Super Cup)		Total	
Club	Season	Division	Apps	Goals	Apps	Goals	Apps	Goals	Apps	Goals	Apps	Goals
Al-Arabi	2024–25	Kuwaiti Premier League	12	2	3	3	4 (Note: All appearance(s) in AFC Challenge League)	0	5	1	24	6
Al-Arabi	2025-26	Kuwaiti Premier League	9	1	1	0	0 (Note: All appearance(s) in AFC Challenge League)	0	3	1	13	2
Career total			21	3	4	3	4	0	8	2	37	8

== International career ==
=== International goals ===
Scores and results list Bahrain's goal tally first.

No.	Date	Venue	Opponent	Score	Result	Competition
1.	23 March 2017	Khalifa Sports City Stadium, Isa Town, Bahrain	Tajikistan	1–1	1–1	Friendly
2.	5 September 2017	Bahrain National Stadium, Riffa, Bahrain	Chinese Taipei	1–0	5–0	2019 AFC Asian Cup qualification
3.	29 December 2018	Khalifa Sports City Stadium, Isa Town, Bahrain	North Korea	3–0	4–0	Friendly
4.	5 September 2019	Bahrain National Stadium, Riffa, Bahrain	Iraq	1–0	1–1	2022 FIFA World Cup qualification
5.	10 September 2019	Olympic Stadium, Phnom Penh, Cambodia	Cambodia	1–0	1–0	2022 FIFA World Cup qualification
6.	12 November 2020	Theyab Awana Stadium, Dubai, United Arab Emirates	Lebanon	2–1	3–1	Friendly
7.	3 June 2021	Bahrain National Stadium, Riffa, Bahrain	Cambodia	1–0	8–0	2022 FIFA World Cup qualification
8.	3 June 2021	Bahrain National Stadium, Riffa, Bahrain	Cambodia	6–0	8–0	2022 FIFA World Cup qualification
9.	16 November 2021	Bahrain National Stadium, Riffa, Bahrain	Kyrgyzstan	4–2	4–2	Friendly
10.	26 March 2022	Al Muharraq Stadium, Arad, Bahrain	Burundi	1–0	1–0	Friendly
11.	8 June 2022	Bukit Jalil National Stadium, Kuala Lumpur, Malaysia	Bangladesh	2–0	2–0	2023 AFC Asian Cup qualification
12.	7 January 2023	Al-Minaa Olympic Stadium, Basra, Iraq	United Arab Emirates	1–0	2–1	25th Arabian Gulf Cup
13.	26 March 2024	Bahrain National Stadium, Riffa, Bahrain	Nepal	3–0	3–0	2026 FIFA World Cup qualification
14.	14 November 2026	Zhaoqing New District Sports Center Stadium, Zhaoqing, China	Yemen	2–1	3–1	Friendly

== Honours ==
Al-Riffa

- Bahraini Premier League: 2013–14, 2018–19, 2020–21
- Bahraini King's Cup: 2018–19, 2020–21
- Bahraini FA Cup: 2013–14

Al-Khaldiya

- Bahraini Super Cup: 2023–24, 2024–25

Bahrain

- GCC U-23 Championship: 2013
- WAFF Championship: 2019
- Arabian Gulf Cup: 2019, 2024-25

Individual

- Topscorer Bahrain League: Golden Shoe 2019–20

== See also ==
- List of men's footballers with 100 or more international caps
