= Ahmed Dashti =

Kuwaiti footballer

Personal information
- Full name: Ahmad Mohammad Dashti
- Date of birth: 24 August 1994 (age 32)
- Place of birth: Dashti, Hormozgan, Iran
- Height: 1.81 m (5 ft 11 in)
- Position: Goalkeeper

Team information
- Current team: Al-Fahaheel
- Number: 26

Youth career
- 2005-2013: Al-Arabi

Senior career*
Years	Team	Apps	(Gls)
2013–2026	Al-Arabi	30	(0)
2019–2020	→ Al-Jahra (loan)	21	(0)
2020–2022	→ Al-Shabab (loan)	42	(0)
2026–	Al-Fahaheel	0	(0)

International career^{‡}
2013-2015	Kuwait U-20	8	(0)
2015-2017	Kuwait U-23	11	(0)
- * Club domestic league appearances and goals as of 3 May 2025 ‡ National team caps and goals as of 31 June 2024

Ahmed Dashti (born 24 August 1994) is a Kuwaiti professional footballer. He is a goalkeeper for Al-Fahaheel and Kuwait national football team.

== Club career ==
=== Al-Arabi ===
He was called up with his twin brother Mahmoud Dashti from the youth division, Ahmed was called up as the third goalkeeper at age 18, winning the 2013–14 Kuwaiti Federation Cup, the 2014–15 Kuwait Crown Prince Cup, and the Kuwait Emir Cup.

=== loan spells ===
He was loaned in the 2019–20 season to Jahra where he won the Kuwaiti Division One.

The following two seasons in 2020 till 2022 he was loaned to Al-Shabab.

=== Return to Al-Arabi ===
After returning and playing as secondary goalkeeper, he featured in both AFC Cup and AFC Challenge League matches. Winning multiple championships.

=== Al-Fahaheel ===
After 13 years at his boyhood club Dashti left on a free transfer to Al-Fahaheel.

== Honours ==
=== Al-Arabi ===
- Kuwaiti Premier League: 2020–21
- Kuwait Emir Cup: 2019–20
- Kuwait Crown Prince Cup: 2014-15, 2021–22, 2022–23, 2025–26
- Kuwait Federation Cup: 2013-14

=== Al-Jahra ===
- Kuwaiti Division One: 2019-20
