= Hamad Al-Harbi =

Kuwaiti footballer

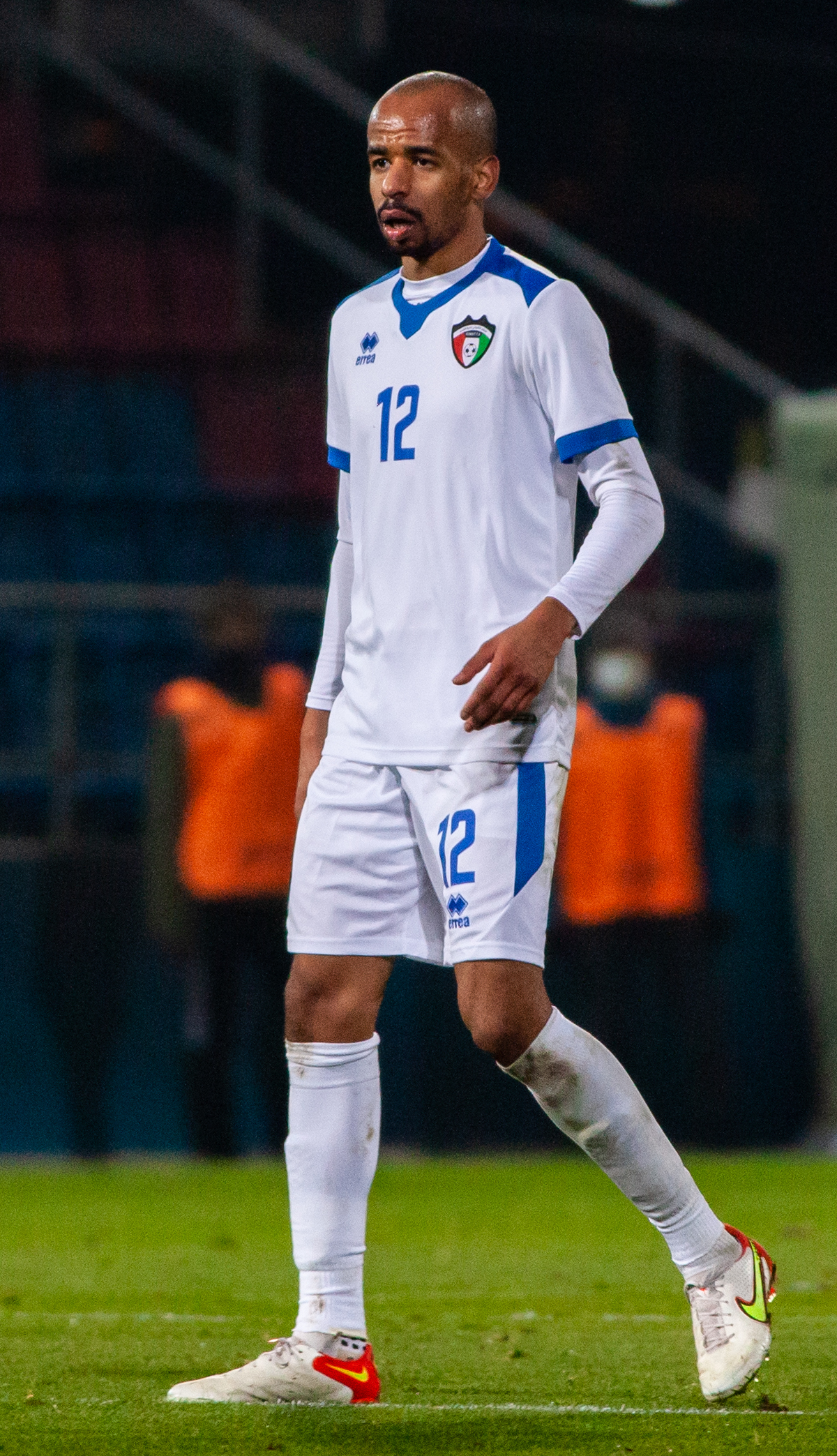
- Al-Harbi with Kuwait in 2021

Personal information
- Full name: Hamad Ali Sultan Abdullah Saleh Al-Harbi
- Date of birth: 25 July 1992 (age 34)
- Place of birth: Kuwait
- Height: 1.82 m (6 ft 0 in)
- Position: Center back

Team information
- Current team: Al-Arabi
- Number: 12

Youth career
- 2004-2011: Kazma

Senior career*
Years	Team	Apps	(Gls)
2010–2025	Kazma	401	(17)
2025-	Al-Arabi		

International career^{‡}
2010-2012	Kuwait U-20	5	(0)
2011-2013	Kuwait U-23	4	(1)
2013–	Kuwait	38	(0)
- * Club domestic league appearances and goals as of 3 May 2025 ‡ National team caps and goals as of 11 September 2025

Hamad Al-Harbi (born 27 July 1992) is a Kuwaiti professional footballer who plays as an Center back for Al-Arabi and the Kuwait national football team.

== Club career ==
=== Kazma ===
Al-Harbi made his first-team debut for Kazma as a defender at the age of 18, after signing his first professional contract in 2010. He featured during the 2010–11 season, winning the Kuwait Emir Cup in his debut campaign. In his fourth season (2013–14), he was named the club's Player of the Season, an accolade he received again in 2014–15 and 2015–16.

He won the Kuwait Federation Cup in 2015–16 and 2017–18, and claimed the Kuwait Emir Cup again in 2022.

During the COVID-19 pandemic, Al-Harbi was among the first players in Kuwait to contract the virus, which limited his appearances during that period. He announced that he would leave the club at the end of the 2024–25 season.

=== Al-Arabi ===
On 14 July 2025, Al-Harbi announced that he would join Al-Arabi.

== International career ==
Al-Harbi made his debut for the Kuwait national team in 2019, in a 1–0 victory against Nepal in Kuwait. Although he had been called up to the national team since 2013, he did not earn a cap until his debut. He was also selected for the 2023 SAFF Championship, the Arabian Gulf Cup, the 2022 FIFA World Cup qualifiers, and the 2026 FIFA World Cup qualifiers.

== Honours ==
=== Kazma ===
- Kuwait Emir Cup: 2011, 2022
- Kuwait Federation Cup: 2015–16, 2017–18

=== Individual ===
Kazma Player of the season: 2013–14, 2014–15, 2015–16
