= Ali Abdul Rasul =

Kuwaiti footballer (born 1999)

Personal information
- Full name: Ali Hasan Abdel Al-Rasoul bin Owfi Muhaisen
- Date of birth: 13 January 1999 (age 27)
- Place of birth: Kuwait
- Height: 1.74 m (5 ft 9 in)
- Position: Left back

Team information
- Current team: Al-Arabi
- Number: 16

Youth career
- 2015-2020: Al-Yarmouk

Senior career*
Years	Team	Apps	(Gls)
2018–2021	Al-Yarmouk	33	(3)
2021–	Al-Arabi	40	(0)

International career^{‡}
2018-2019	Kuwait U-20	7	(0)
2019-2022	Kuwait U-23	11	(0)
2021–	Kuwait	3	(0)
- * Club domestic league appearances and goals as of 3 May 2025 ‡ National team caps and goals as of 31 December 2024

Ali Abdul Rasul (born 4 December 1999) is a Kuwaiti professional soccer player who plays as a Left back for Al-Arabi and Kuwait national football team.

== Club career ==
=== Al-Yarmouk ===
Ali made his debut after Al-Yarmouk called him up to the first team in 2018-19 season, a year later he became the youngest captain in Al-Yarmouk's History, he requested his release at the end of the season after contract dispute.

=== Al-Arabi ===
On October 2021, he signed with Al-Arabi on a five year deal.

== National career ==
Ali was first called up against Bosnia in 2021, but made his debut 2 years later in the 2023 SAFF Championship.

== Honours ==
=== Al-Yarmouk ===
- Kuwaiti Division One: 2018–19

=== Al-Arabi ===
- Kuwait Crown Prince Cup: 2021-22, 2022-23
- Kuwait Super Cup: 2021

=== Kuwait ===
- SAFF Championship (Runner Up): 2023
