= Abdulaziz Nasari =

Iranian footballer (born 1998)

Personal information
- Date of birth: 2 May 1998 (age 28)
- Place of birth: Kuwait
- Height: 1.74 m (5 ft 9 in)
- Position: Left back

Team information
- Current team: Al-Arabi
- Number: 38

Youth career
- 2013-15: Qadsia

Senior career*
Years	Team	Apps	(Gls)
2016–2018	Qadsia (Futsal)	45	(23)
2017–2025	Qadsia	92	(3)
2022	→ Al-Tadamon (loan)	13	(1)
2024–2025	→ Al-Tadamon (loan)	22	(5)
2025–	Al-Arabi	0	(0)
- * Club domestic league appearances and goals as of 5 June 2025 ‡ National team caps and goals as of 5 June 2025

Abdulaziz Nasari (born 2 May 1998) is a Persian professional footballer who plays as a Left back for Al-Arabi.

== Club career ==
=== Qadsia ===
Abdulaziz started his career as a futsal player in Qadsia till 2018 after trying out a year earlier to join the football team. He played with the team till the end of 2025 after requesting his release where he won the Kuwait Emir Cup and Kuwait Federation Cup.

=== Al-Tadamon ===
At the beginning of his football career he was loaned to Al-Tadamon on a 6-month spell and later on for a full season in 2024–25.

=== Al-Arabi ===
On July 20, 2025, Al-Arabi announced Nasari would sign a three-year deal.

== Honours ==
=== Qadsia ===
- Kuwait Emir Cup: 2023–24
- Kuwait Federation Cup: 2022-23

=== Individual ===
- Kuwaiti Premier League Player of the Month: April 2018
