= 2023 SAFF Championship =

Fourteenth edition of the SAFF Championship

Tournament details
- Host country: India
- Dates: 21 June – 4 July
- Teams: 8 (from 2 sub-confederations)
- Venue: 1 (in 1 host city)

Final positions
- Champions: India (9th title)
- Runners-up: Kuwait

Tournament statistics
- Matches played: 15
- Goals scored: 38 (2.53 per match)
- Attendance: 93,993 (6,266 per match)
- Top scorer: (India) Sunil Chhetri (5 goals)
- Best player: (India) Sunil Chhetri
- Best goalkeeper: (Bangladesh) Anisur Rahman Zico
- Fair play award: Nepal

The 2023 SAFF Championship (known as the 2023 Bangabandhu SAFF Championship for sponsorship reasons) was the 14th edition of the SAFF Championship, the biennial international men's football championship of South Asia organised by South Asian Football Federation (SAFF). The event was held at the Sree Kanteerava Stadium in Bangalore, India from 21 June to 4 July 2023.

India, the defending champions, won their record-extending ninth championship by defeating Kuwait in the final.

== Host selection ==
At the SAFF Executive Committee meeting, held on 17 October 2021 in the Maldives, Football Sri Lanka expressed their interest to bid for hosting the tournament. However, FIFA suspended Sri Lanka on 21 January 2023, which ceased them from hosting and participation in any football tournament.

Later on 30 January 2023, SAFF unofficially announced that only Nepal had applied for hosting rights till the deadline which is 29 January 2023. The host was supposed to be announced following the SAFF members' meeting during 33rd AFC Congress in Manama, Bahrain on 1 February 2023. On 14 February 2023, India were declared as the hosts of the 14th edition of the championship. On 19 March 2023, AIFF announced Bangalore as the host city for SAFF Championship 2023.

== Participating nations ==
Football Sri Lanka was sanctioned by FIFA on 21 January 2023, which made them ineligible for participation in the competition. Kuwait and Lebanon were invited as guest teams with a view to increase the number of teams for the championship and make the event more competitive.

Country	Appearance	Previous best performance	FIFA ranking (6 April 2023)
Bangladesh	13th	Champions (2003)	192
Bhutan	9th	Semi-finals (2008)	185
India	14th	Champions (Eight times) (Note: India has won in 1993, 1997, 1999, 2005, 2009, 2011, 2015, and 2021.)	101
Kuwait	1st	Debut (invitee)	143
Lebanon	1st	Debut (invitee)	99
Maldives	12th	Champions (2008, 2018)	154
Nepal	14th	Runners-up (2021)	174
Pakistan	12th	Third place (1997)	195

== Venue ==
The Sree Kanteerava Stadium in Bangalore, Karnataka, India hosted all the matches.

Bangalore	2023 SAFF Championship is located in India
Sree Kanteerava Stadium	2023 SAFF Championship is located in India
12°58′10.92″N 77°35′36.24″E	2023 SAFF Championship is located in India
Capacity: 25,810	2023 SAFF Championship is located in India
Aerial view Sree Kanteerava Stadium	2023 SAFF Championship is located in India

== Draw ==
The draw ceremony was held on 17 May 2023 at 12:30 IST in New Delhi, India.

Pot 1	Pot 2	Pot 3	Pot 4
Lebanon (99); India (101) (hosts)	Kuwait (143); Maldives (154)	Nepal (174); Bhutan (185)	Bangladesh (192); Pakistan (195)

=== Draw result ===
Group A
Pos	Team
A1	India
A2	Kuwait
A3	Nepal
A4	Pakistan

Group B
Pos	Team
B1	Lebanon
B2	Maldives
B3	Bhutan
B4	Bangladesh

== Match officials ==
Referees

- (Bangladesh) Md Alamgir Sarker
- (Bhutan) Pema Tshewang
- (India) Crystal John
- (Maldives) Sinan Hussain
- (Nepal) Prajwol Chhetri
- (Pakistan) Irshad Ul Haq

Assistant referees

- (Bangladesh) Mohammad Nuruzzaman
- (Bhutan) Phurpa Wangchuk
- (India) S Manikandan
- (India) Sumanta Dutta
- (Maldives) Ahmed Hassan
- (Nepal) Nani Ram Thapa Magar

== Group stage ==
=== Group A ===
Pos	Team	Pld	W	D	L	GF	GA	GD	Pts	Qualification
1	Kuwait	3	2	1	0	8	2	+6	7	Qualified for Semi-finals
2	India (H)	3	2	1	0	7	1	+6	7	Qualified for Semi-finals
3	Nepal	3	1	0	2	2	5	−3	3	
4	Pakistan	3	0	0	3	0	9	−9	0	

Source: Global Sports Archive
(H) Hosts
21 June 2023
15:30

Kuwait	3–1	Nepal
El Ebrahim 23'; Al-Khaldi 42'; Daham 65' (pen.)	Report	Bista 69'

Sree Kanteerava Stadium, Bangalore
Attendance: 1,200
Referee: Md Alamgir Sarker (Bangladesh)
21 June 2023
19:30

India	4–0	Pakistan
Chhetri 10', 16' (pen.), 75' (pen.); Kumam 81'	Report

Sree Kanteerava Stadium, Bangalore
Attendance: 22,860
Referee: Prajwol Chhetri (Nepal)

24 June 2023
15:30

Pakistan	0–4	Kuwait
	Report	Al-Enezi 10'; Al-Faneeni 17', 45+1'; Al-Rasheedi 69'

Sree Kanteerava Stadium, Bangalore
Attendance: 309
Referee: Pema Tshewang (Bhutan)
24 June 2023
19:30

Nepal	0–2	India
	Report	Chhetri 62'; N. M. Singh 70'

Sree Kanteerava Stadium, Bangalore
Attendance: 12,642
Referee: Sinan Hussain (Maldives)

27 June 2023
15:30

Nepal	1–0	Pakistan
Chaudhary 80'	Report

Sree Kanteerava Stadium, Bangalore
Attendance: 250
Referee: Sinan Hussain (Maldives)
27 June 2023
19:30

India	1–1	Kuwait
Chhetri 45+2'	Report	A. Ali 90+2' (o.g.)

Sree Kanteerava Stadium, Bangalore
Attendance: 9,562
Referee: Md Alamgir Sarker (Bangladesh)

=== Group B ===
Pos	Team	Pld	W	D	L	GF	GA	GD	Pts	Qualification
1	Lebanon	3	3	0	0	7	1	+6	9	Qualified for Semi-finals
2	Bangladesh	3	2	0	1	6	4	+2	6	Qualified for Semi-finals
3	Maldives	3	1	0	2	3	4	−1	3	
4	Bhutan	3	0	0	3	2	9	−7	0	

Source: Global Sports Archive
22 June 2023
15:30

Lebanon	2–0	Bangladesh
Maatouk 80'; Bader 90+6'	Report

Sree Kanteerava Stadium, Bangalore
Attendance: 50
Referee: Crystal John (India)
22 June 2023
19:30

Maldives	2–0	Bhutan
Mohamed 6' (pen.); N. Hassan 90'	Report

Sree Kanteerava Stadium, Bangalore
Attendance: 200
Referee: Irshad Ul Haq (Pakistan)

25 June 2023
15:30

Bangladesh	3–1	Maldives
Rakib 42'; Kazi 67'; Morsalin 90'	Report	Hamza 18'

Sree Kanteerava Stadium, Bangalore
Attendance: 100
Referee: Prajwol Chhetri (Nepal)
25 June 2023
19:30

Bhutan	1–4	Lebanon
Gyeltshen 79'	Report	Sadek 11'; Al Haj 23'; Bader 35'; M. Zein 42'

Sree Kanteerava Stadium, Bangalore
Attendance: 250
Referee: Irshad Ul Haq (Pakistan)

28 June 2023
15:30

Lebanon	1–0	Maldives
Maatouk 24'	Report

Sree Kanteerava Stadium, Bangalore
Attendance: 50
Referee: Pema Tshewang (Bhutan)
28 June 2023
19:30

Bhutan	1–3	Bangladesh
Dorji 12'	Report	Morsalin 21'; Jigme 31' (o.g.); Rakib 36'

Sree Kanteerava Stadium, Bangalore
Referee: Crystal John (India)

== Knockout stage ==
=== Bracket ===
Semi-finals
1 July 2023
Kuwait (a.e.t.)	1
Bangladesh	0
1 July 2023
Lebanon	0 (2)
India (p)	0 (4)

Final
4 July 2023
Kuwait	1 (4)
India (p)	1 (5)

=== Semi-finals ===
1 July 2023
15:00

Kuwait	1–0 (a.e.t.)	Bangladesh
Al-Buloushi 105+2'	Report

Sree Kanteerava Stadium, Bangalore
Attendance: 500
Referee: Crystal John (India)
1 July 2023
19:30

Lebanon	0–0 (a.e.t.)	India
	Report
Penalties
Maatouk (penalty missed); Shour (penalty scored); Sadek (penalty scored); Bader (penalty missed)	2–4	(penalty scored) Chhetri; (penalty scored) A. Ali; (penalty scored) Mahesh; (penalty scored) Udanta

Sree Kanteerava Stadium, Bangalore
Attendance: 19,640
Referee: Sinan Hussain (Maldives)

=== Final ===
4 July 2023
19:30

Kuwait	1–1 (a.e.t.)	India
Khaldi 14'	Report	Chhangte 36'
Penalties
Daham (penalty missed); Otaibi (penalty scored); Dhaferi (penalty scored); Naji (penalty scored); Khaldi (penalty scored); Hajeyah (penalty missed)	4–5	(penalty scored) Chhetri; (penalty scored) Jhingan; (penalty scored) Chhangte; (penalty missed) Udanta; (penalty scored) S. Bose; (penalty scored) Mahesh

Sree Kantiramva Stadium, Bengaluru
Attendance: 24,563
Referee: Prajwol Chhetri (Nepal)

== Statistics ==
=== Goalscorers ===
There were 38 goals scored in 15 matches, for an average of 2.53 goals per match.

5 goals

- (India) Sunil Chhetri

2 goals

- (Bangladesh) Rakib Hossain
- (Bangladesh) Shekh Morsalin
- (Kuwait) Mobarak Al-Faneeni
- (Kuwait) Shabaib Al-Khaldi
- (Lebanon) Khalil Bader
- (Lebanon) Hassan Maatouk
- (Maldives) Hamza Mohamed

1 goal

- (Bangladesh) Tariq Kazi
- (Bhutan) Tsenda Dorji
- (Bhutan) Chencho Gyeltshen
- (India) Udanta Singh Kumam
- (India) Naorem Mahesh Singh
- (India) Lallianzuala Chhangte
- (Kuwait) Abdullah Al-Buloushi
- (Kuwait) Mohammad Daham
- (Kuwait) Khalid El Ebrahim
- (Kuwait) Hasan Al-Enezi
- (Kuwait) Eid Naser Al-Rasheedi
- (Lebanon) Ali Al Haj
- (Lebanon) Mohamad Omar Sadek
- (Lebanon) Mahdi Zein
- (Maldives) Naiz Hassan
- (Nepal) Anjan Bista
- (Nepal) Aashish Chaudhary

1 own goal

- (Bhutan) Phuntsho Jigme (against Bangladesh)
- (India) Anwar Ali (against Kuwait)

=== Awards ===
Most Valuable Player	Top Scorer	Goalkeeper	Fair Play
(India) Sunil Chhetri	(India) Sunil Chhetri (5 goals)	(Bangladesh) Anisur Rahman Zico	Nepal

== Champion ==
SAFF Championship 2023

India
9th title

== Prize money ==
Prize money amounts were announced in 2023.

Position	Amount (USD)
Champions	50,000
Runner-up	25,000
Total	75,000

== Broadcasting ==
Country	Broadcaster	Ref.
Bangladesh	T Sports	
India	DD Bharati, DD Sports, FanCode	
Kuwait	Kuwait Television	
Lebanon	LBCI	
Maldives	ICE TV, Yes TV	
Nepal	Kantipur Television	
Pakistan	Geo Super, A Sports	

== See also ==
2023 in SAFF
Men's
U-16 Championship	U-19 Championship	Senior Championship (Final)
Women's
U-17 Championship	U-20 Championship	

- 2022 SAFF Women's Championship
- 2022 AFF Championship
- 2022 EAFF E-1 Football Championship
- 2023 CAFA Nations Cup
- 2023 WAFF Championship
- 2023 AFC Asian Cup
- 2026 FIFA World Cup Asian qualifiers
