= 2022–23 Kuwaiti Premier League =

Kuwaiti Premier League
- Season: 2022–23
- Dates: 25 August 2022 – 28 May 2023
- Champions: Al-Kuwait (18)
- Relegated: Al-Tadhamon; Al-Sahel
- Matches: 132
- Goals: 422 (3.2 per match)
- Top goalscorer: (Tunisia) Taha Yassine Khenissi (20 goals)

61st edition of the tournament. Kuwait SC are the defending champions.

== Main league table ==
The main league, consisting of 10 teams in which the top six clubs competing in the league and the last four clubs qualifying for the relegation group are determined.

| Pos | Team | Pld | W | D | L | GF | GA | GD | Pts | Qualification or relegation |
|---|---|---|---|---|---|---|---|---|---|---|
| 1 | Al-Kuwait | 18 | 9 | 8 | 1 | 37 | 22 | +15 | 35 | Qualification for Championship Play-offs |
| 2 | Kazma | 18 | 8 | 5 | 5 | 33 | 27 | +6 | 29 | Qualification for Championship Play-offs |
| 3 | Al-Qadsia | 18 | 8 | 5 | 5 | 30 | 24 | +6 | 29 | Qualification for Championship Play-offs |
| 4 | Al-Arabi | 18 | 7 | 7 | 4 | 31 | 22 | +9 | 28 | Qualification for Championship Play-offs |
| 5 | Al-Fahaheel | 18 | 7 | 3 | 8 | 31 | 31 | 0 | 24 | Qualification for Championship Play-offs |
| 6 | Al-Salmiya | 18 | 5 | 8 | 5 | 25 | 22 | +3 | 23 | Qualification for Championship Play-offs |
| 7 | Al-Jahra | 18 | 6 | 5 | 7 | 21 | 25 | −4 | 23 | Qualification for Relegation-offs |
| 8 | Al-Nasar | 18 | 5 | 6 | 7 | 30 | 40 | −10 | 21 | Qualification for Relegation-offs |
| 9 | Al-Tadhamon | 18 | 4 | 4 | 10 | 19 | 35 | −16 | 16 | Qualification for Relegation-offs |
| 10 | Al-Sahel | 18 | 3 | 5 | 10 | 22 | 31 | −9 | 14 | Qualification for Relegation-offs |

Updated to match(es) played on 10 March 2023. Source:

== Championship play-offs ==
| Pos | Team | Pld | W | D | L | GF | GA | GD | Pts | Qualification or relegation |
|---|---|---|---|---|---|---|---|---|---|---|
| 1 | Al-Kuwait (C) | 28 | 15 | 10 | 3 | 65 | 33 | +32 | 55 | Qualification for AFC Cup Group Stage |
| 2 | Al-Arabi | 28 | 13 | 10 | 5 | 53 | 34 | +19 | 49 | |
| 3 | Kazma | 28 | 12 | 7 | 9 | 48 | 49 | −1 | 43 | |
| 4 | Al-Qadsia | 28 | 11 | 8 | 9 | 44 | 44 | 0 | 41 | |
| 5 | Al-Salmiya | 28 | 8 | 9 | 11 | 39 | 43 | −4 | 33 | |
| 6 | Al-Fahaheel | 28 | 9 | 4 | 15 | 44 | 51 | −7 | 31 | |

Updated to match(es) played on 28 May 2023. Source:
(C) Champions

== Relegation-offs ==
| Pos | Team | Pld | W | D | L | GF | GA | GD | Pts | |
|---|---|---|---|---|---|---|---|---|---|---|
| 1 | Al-Nasar | 24 | 9 | 7 | 8 | 41 | 47 | −6 | 34 | |
| 2 | Al-Jahra | 24 | 8 | 6 | 10 | 28 | 36 | −8 | 30 | |
| 3 | Al-Tadhamon (R) | 24 | 6 | 5 | 13 | 28 | 47 | −19 | 23 | Relegation to Kuwaiti Division One |
| 4 | Al-Sahel (R) | 24 | 5 | 6 | 13 | 31 | 37 | −6 | 21 | Relegation to Kuwaiti Division One |

Updated to match(es) played on 28 May 2023. Source:
(R) Relegated

== Statistics ==
=== Top scorers ===
| Rank | Name | Team | Goals | Games |
|---|---|---|---|---|
| 1 | (Tunisia) Taha Yassine Khenissi | Al-Kuwait | 20 | 19 |
| 2 | (Libya) Mohammed Soulah | Al-Arabi | 19 | 27 |
| 3 | (Kuwait) Mohammad Daham | Al-Nasr | 18 | 26 |
| 3 | (Kuwait) Shabaib Al-Khaldi | Kazma | 18 | 20 |
| 4 | (Nigeria) Kingsley Eduwo | Al-Arabi | 12 | 24 |
