= 2020–21 Kuwaiti Premier League =

Kuwaiti Premier League
- Season: 2020–21
- Dates: 15 October 2020 – 17 May 2021
- Champions: Al-Arabi (17)
- Relegated: Khaitan; Al Sahel
- 2021 AFC Cup: Al-Kuwait
- Matches: 90
- Goals: 263 (2.92 per match)
- Top goalscorer: Oday Dabbagh (13 goals)

59th edition of the tournament. Kuwait SC are the defending champions.

== Teams ==
Location football club of Kuwaiti Premier League

Team	Based	Home stadium	Capacity
Al Arabi	Kuwait City	Sabah Al-Salem Stadium	26,000
Al-Fahaheel	Al-Ahmadi	Fahaheel Stadium	2,000
Kazma	Kuwait City	Al-Sadaqua Walsalam Stadium	21,500
Khaitan	Al Farwaniyah	Khaitan Stadium	11,000
Al Kuwait	Kuwait City	Al Kuwait Sports Club Stadium	18,500
Al Nasar	Al Farwaniyah	Ali Al-Salem Al-Sabah Stadium	10,000
Al Qadsia	Kuwait City	Mohammed Al-Hamad Stadium	22,000
Al-Shabab	Al-Ahmadi	Al-Ahmadi Stadium	18,000
Al-Sahel	Abu Halifa	Abu Halifa City Stadium	2,000
Al-Salmiya	Hawalli	Thamir Stadium	16,105

== Main league table ==
The main league, consisting of 15 teams, was played between 15 October, 2020 and 26 December, 2020 to determine the clubs competing in the league and relegating to the second division.

Pos	Team	Pld	W	D	L	GF	GA	GD	Pts	Qualification or relegation
1	Al-Nasar	14	10	2	2	26	5	+21	32 (Note: Goal Difference: Al-Nasar +21, Al-Qadsia +14)	Qualification for Championship Group
2	Al-Qadsia	14	10	2	2	28	14	+14	32	Qualification for Championship Group
3	Al-Salmiya	14	8	5	1	30	13	+17	29	Qualification for Championship Group
4	Kazma	14	8	4	2	22	10	+12	28	Qualification for Championship Group
5	Al-Kuwait	14	7	3	4	25	16	+9	24	Qualification for Championship Group
6	Al-Arabi	14	6	4	4	19	17	+2	22 (Note: Goal Difference: Al-Arabi +2, Al-Shabab +1)	Qualification for Championship Group
7	Al-Shabab	14	6	4	4	19	18	+1	22	Qualification for Championship Group
8	Al-Fahaheel	14	5	3	6	12	12	0	18 (Note: Goal Difference: Al-Fahaheel 0, Khaitan −10)	Qualification for Championship Group
9	Khaitan	14	5	3	6	16	26	−10	18	Qualification for Championship Group
10	Al-Sahel	14	5	2	7	14	15	−1	17 (Note: Goal Difference: Al-Sahel −1, Burgan −3)	Qualification for Championship Group
11	Burgan (R)	14	4	5	5	13	16	−3	17	Relegation to Kuwaiti Division One
12	Al-Jahra (R)	14	2	5	7	13	20	−7	11	Relegation to Kuwaiti Division One
13	Al-Yarmouk (R)	14	2	2	10	22	36	−14	8 (Note: Goal Difference: Al-Yarmouk −14, Al Tadhamon −17)	Relegation to Kuwaiti Division One
14	Al Tadhamon (R)	14	2	2	10	14	31	−17	8	Relegation to Kuwaiti Division One
15	Al-Sulaibikhat (R)	14	1	2	11	9	33	−24	5	Relegation to Kuwaiti Division One

Source: KFA, Goalzz
(R) Relegated

== League table ==
Pos	Team	Pld	W	D	L	GF	GA	GD	Pts	Qualification or relegation
1	Al-Arabi (C)	18	13	5	0	39	16	+23	44	Qualification for AFC Cup Play-off round
2	Al-Qadsia	18	10	6	2	32	16	+16	36	
3	Al-Kuwait	18	9	7	2	37	20	+17	34	
4	Kazma	18	6	7	5	30	22	+8	25	
5	Al-Nasar	18	6	4	8	20	23	−3	22	
6	Al-Salmiya	18	6	2	10	25	32	−7	20	
7	Al-Shabab	18	4	7	7	16	23	−7	19	
8	Al-Fahaheel	18	3	7	8	22	36	−14	16	
9	Khaitan (R)	18	3	5	10	21	39	−18	14	Relegation to Kuwaiti Division One
10	Al-Sahel (R)	18	3	4	11	21	36	−15	13	Relegation to Kuwaiti Division One

Source: KFA, Goalzz
(C) Champions; (R) Relegated

== Statistics ==
=== Top scorers ===
Rank	Name	Team	Goals
1	(Palestine) Oday Dabbagh	Al-Arabi	13
2	(Jordan) Jaime Siaj	Khaitan	12
3	(Kuwait) Yousef Nasser	Kuwait	11
4	(Jordan) Odai Al-Saify	Qadsia	8
4	(Brazil) Patrick Fabiano	Al-Salmiya	8
