= 2025–26 Kuwaiti Premier League =

Kuwaiti Premier League
- Season: 2025–26
- Dates: 12 September 2025 – 29 June 2026
- Champions: Al-Kuwait (21st title)
- AFC Champions League Two: Al-Kuwait (via ACGL); Al-Arabi (preliminary)
- AFC Challenge League: Al-Qadsia
- AGCFF Gulf Club Champions: Kazma
- Top goalscorer: (Kuwait) Yousef Nasser (14 goals)
- Biggest home win: Al-Kuwait 7–1 Al-Tadhamon
- Biggest away win: Al-Shabab 0–5 Al-Arabi
- Highest scoring: Al-Kuwait 7–1 Al-Tadhamon
- All statistics correct as of 11 July 2026.

The 2025–26 Kuwaiti Premier League (also known as Zain Premier League) is the 64th edition of the Kuwait Premier League, the top-tier of Kuwaiti football, since being established in 1961. Kuwait SC are the 4-time defending champions following a 2–1 win against Al Arabi in final game of last season’s championship round.

It was announced on June 20, 2025, that the league would kick off after the September FIFA international break, on September 12, 2025. On 28 February, the Minister of Youth Affairs Tariq Al-Jalahma announced the full suspension of all sporting activities, including the league, for undetermined period due the Iranian strikes on Kuwait. This suspension ended in May 2026, with games resuming from May 14.

== Teams ==
10 teams will compete in the league – the top 8 teams from the previous season and the 2 teams promoted from the Division One.

=== Club changes ===
==== To Premier League ====
Promoted from the Kuwaiti Division One

- Al-Jahra
- Al-Shabab

==== From Premier League ====
Relegated to the Kuwaiti Division One

- Al-Yarmouk
- Khaitan

=== Stadia and locations ===
Team	City/Town	Stadium	Capacity
Al Arabi	Mansouria	Sabah Al Salem Stadium	28,000
Fahaheel	Fahaheel	Nayef Al-Dabbous Stadium	10,000
Jahra	Jahra	Mubarak Al-Aiar Stadium	17,000
Kazma	Adiliya	Al-Sadaqua Walsalam Stadium	21,500
Kuwait SC	Sulaibikhat	Jaber Al-Mubarak Al-Hamad Stadium (Note: Due to the temporary closure of Kuwait SC Stadium)	15,000
Nasr	Ardiya	Ali Al-Salem Stadium	10,000
Qadsia	Hawalli	Mohammed Al-Hamad Stadium	22,000
Salmiya	Salmiya	Thamir Stadium	16,105
Shabab	Al Ahmadi	Al-Ahmadi Stadium	18,000
Tadamon	Farwaniya	Farwaniya Stadium	14,000

=== Personnel and kits ===
Team	Head coach	Captain (s)	Kit manufacturer	Shirt sponsor	Other sponsors
Al Arabi	(Kuwait) Nasser Al-Shatti	(Kuwait) Sulaiman Abdulghafour	AlNasser	Al Ahli Bank of Kuwait; West End Watch Co.	Mkhmkh; Saray Perfumes
Kuwait	(Montenegro) Nebojša Jovović	(Kuwait) Fahed Al Hajri	HH Sports	BMW; Al-Seef Hospital	Ananas; Diamond House
Qadsia	(Tunisia) Nabil Maâloul	(Kuwait) Bader Al-Mutawa	Erreà	Jazeera Airways; Miles Water	Auto1; Intersport; Fix Pro
Al-Salmiya	(Bahrain) Ali Ashoor	(Kuwait) Fawaz Al-Otaibi	Jako	Atyab Al-Marshoud; MJ Clinic	Ultra Water
Kazma	(Croatia) Dragan Tadić	(Kuwait) Hussain Kankone	HH Sports	None	None
Fahaheel	(Syria) Firas Al-Khatib	(Jordan) Mohammed Naeem	Wolves Sport	Infinity ECN	None
Al Nasar	(Tunisia) Djamel Belkacem	(Kuwait) Salman Bormeya	Victory	None	None
Al-Jahra	(Kuwait) Ahmed Abdulkareem	(Kuwait) Abdullah Al-Masameh	HH Sports	None	None
Al-Shabab	(Montenegro) Slavoljub Bubanja	(Kuwait) Mohammed Al-Qabandi	Luanvi	None	None
Al-Tadamon	(Croatia) Igor Remetić	(Kuwait) Abdulaziz Al-Bisher	Erreà	Cheesy Burger; Rare Design	None

=== Managerial changes ===
Team	Outgoing manager	Manner of departure	Date of vacancy	Position in table	Incoming manager	Date of appointment
Kazma	(Bosnia and Herzegovina) Rusmir Cviko	End of contract	1 June 2025	Pre-season	(Croatia) Dragan Tadić	1 June 2025
Jahra	(Kuwait) Mohammad Dehilis	End of contract	1 June 2025	Pre-season	(Croatia) Rodion Gačanin	7 June 2025
Qadsia	(Montenegro) Željko Petrović	End of contract	1 June 2025	Pre-season	(Tunisia) Nabil Maâloul	11 June 2025
Tadamon	(Kuwait) Jamal Al-Qabandi	End of contract	1 June 2025	Pre-season	(Portugal) Miguel Leal	21 June 2025
Al Arabi	(Kuwait) Nasser Al-Shatti	End of contract	30 June 2025	Pre-season	(Portugal) Marco Alves	8 July 2025
Salmiya	(Croatia) Ante Miše	Mutual Consent	11 July 2025	Pre-season	(Kuwait) Nasser Al-Shatti	11 July 2025
Salmiya	(Kuwait) Nasser Al-Shatti	Resigned	17 September 2025	6th	(Kuwait) Mohammad Dehilis	19 September 2025
Tadamon	(Portugal) Miguel Leal	Sacked	2 November 2025	9th	(Kuwait) Maher Al-Shammari	2 November 2025
Al Arabi	(Portugal) Marco Alves	Sacked	10 November 2025	3rd	(Kuwait) Nasser Al-Shatti	15 November 2025
Salmiya	(Kuwait) Mohammad Dehilis	Mutual consent	31 January 2026	5th	(Bahrain) Ali Ashoor	31 January 2026
Tadamon	(Kuwait) Maher Al-Shammari	Resigned	5 February 2026	10th	(Croatia) Igor Remetić	7 February 2026
Jahra	(Croatia) Rodion Gačanin	Sacked	16 February 2026	9th	(Kuwait) Ahmad Abdulkareem	16 February 2026

== Main league table ==
Pos	Team	Pld	W	D	L	GF	GA	GD	Pts	Qualification
1	Al-Kuwait (C)	18	13	5	0	46	10	+36	44	Qualification for Championship Play-offs
2	Al-Qadsia (C)	18	9	5	4	32	14	+18	32	Qualification for Championship Play-offs
3	Kazma (C)	18	8	6	4	22	17	+5	30	Qualification for Championship Play-offs
4	Al-Arabi (C)	18	8	6	4	28	13	+15	30	Qualification for Championship Play-offs
5	Al-Salmiya (C)	18	8	6	4	21	12	+9	30	Qualification for Championship Play-offs
6	Al-Fahaheel (C)	18	6	3	9	20	35	−15	21	Qualification for Championship Play-offs
7	Al-Tadamon (R)	18	5	3	10	16	28	−12	18	Qualification for Relegation play-offs
8	Al-Shabab (R)	18	4	6	8	12	33	−21	18	Qualification for Relegation play-offs
9	Al-Nasar (R)	18	4	4	10	17	24	−7	16	Qualification for Relegation play-offs
10	Al-Jahra (R)	18	2	2	14	11	39	−28	8	Qualification for Relegation play-offs

Updated to match(es) played on 13 June 2026. Source:
(C) Qualified for the Championship play-offs; (R) Qualified for the Relegation play-offs

Home \ Away	KUW	QAD	ARA	SAL	KAZ	FAH	NAS	TAD	SHA	JAH
Al-Kuwait		2–1	1–0	1–1	2–0	5–0	1–0	7–1	5–1	4–1
Al-Qadsia	1–1		1–2	2–1	0–1	5–1	4–0	3–0	4–1	3–0
Al Arabi	1–1	0–0		3–1	0–1	1–1	2–1	1–1	2–0	4–0
Al-Salmiya	0–0	0–0	1–0		0–1	1–2	1–1	3–1	3–0	2–0
Kazma	1–2	4–2	0–0	1–1		2–3	1–0	0–0	1–1	2–1
Fahaheel	0–4	0–2	0–3	0–2	1–1		2–1	1–0	0–1	4–1
Al Nasar	1–1	0–0	2–1	0–2	1–2	4–2		0–1	1–1	0–1
Al-Tadamon	1–3	1–0	1–2	0–1	1–0	1–0	1–3		1–1	4–1
Al-Shabab	0–4	1–1	0–5	0–0	0–2	1–1	1–0	0–2		1–0
Al-Jahra	0–2	0–2	1–1	0–1	2–2	1–3	0–2	1–0	1–2	

Updated to match(es) played on 13 June 2026. Source:
Legend: Blue = home team win; Yellow = draw; Red = away team win.

== Championship play-offs ==
The top 6 Teams play in the Championship play-offs.

Pos	Team	Pld	W	D	L	GF	GA	GD	Pts	Qualification
1	Al-Kuwait (C)	23	15	8	0	56	15	+41	53	Qualification for AFC Champions League Two Group Stage (Note: Al-Kuwait qualified for the Champions League Two group stage by winning the 2025–26 AFC Challenge League.)
2	Al-Arabi	23	11	6	6	37	16	+21	39	Qualification for AFC Champions League Two preliminary stage
3	Al-Qadsia	23	11	6	6	38	20	+18	39	Qualification for AFC Challenge League Group Stage
4	Kazma	23	10	8	5	27	20	+7	38	Qualification for the AGCFF Gulf Club Champions League group stage
5	Al-Salmiya	23	10	7	6	29	22	+7	37	
6	Al-Fahaheel	23	6	4	13	21	46	−25	22	

Updated to match(es) played on 11 July 2026. Source:
(C) Champions
Notes:

Home \ Away	KUW	QAD	KAZ	ARA	SAL	FAH
Al-Kuwait		0–0	0–0	3–2	3–3	4–0
Al-Qadsia	0–0		1–2	0–2	3–2	2–0
Kazma	0–0	2–1		0–2	3–0	1–1
Al Arabi	2–3	2–0	2–0		0–1	3–0
Al-Salmiya	3–3	2–3	0–3	1–0		2–1
Fahaheel	0–4	0–2	1–1	0–3	1–2	

Updated to match(es) played on 11 July 2026. Source:
Legend: Blue = home team win; Yellow = draw; Red = away team win.

== Relegation play-offs ==
The bottom 4 Teams play in the Relegation play-offs with the bottom 2 relegated.

Pos	Team	Pld	W	D	L	GF	GA	GD	Pts	Relegation
1	Al-Tadamon	21	6	4	11	19	32	−13	22	
2	Al-Nasar	21	5	6	10	22	26	−4	21	
3	Al-Shabab	21	5	6	10	16	39	−23	21	Spared from relegation (Note: The next season will contain 12 teams. Due to this change the relegated teams will continue to participate in the Kuwaiti Premier League next season.)
4	Al-Jahra	21	3	3	15	14	42	−28	12	Spared from relegation

Updated to match(es) played on 11 July 2026. Source:
Notes:

Home \ Away	TAD	SHA	NAS	JAH
Al-Tadamon		1–3	1–1	1–0
Al-Shabab	3–1		0–3	1–2
Al Nasar	1–1	3–0		1–1
Al-Jahra	0–1	2–1	1–1	

Updated to match(es) played on 11 July 2026. Source:
Legend: Blue = home team win; Yellow = draw; Red = away team win.

== Awards ==
As of 11 July 2026

=== Seasonal ===
- Player of the season: Youssef Nasser
- Young Player of the season: Ali Hassan
- Best Goalkeeper: Saud Al Hoshan
- Kuwaiti Golden Boot: Youssef Nasser
- Best Manager: Nebojša Jovović

=== Round awards ===
Round	Player of the Round	
Round	Player	Club
1	Salman Al-Bous	Fahaheel
2	Soud Al-Janaei	Al-Shabab
3	Eid Al-Rashidi	Qadsia
4	Moath Al-Enezi	Al-Salmiya
5	Mohamed Fareeh	Kuwait SC
6	Nasser Faleh	Kazma
7	Othman Al-Shammari	Kazma
8	Abdullah Al-Awadhi	Qadsia
9	Sulaiman Abdulghafour	Al-Arabi
10	Yousef Nasser	Kuwait SC
11	Mohammad Daham	Kuwait SC
12	Yousef Nasser	Kuwait SC
13	Talal Jazaʽa	Al-Naser
14	Talal Jazaʽa	Al-Naser
15	Nasser Falah	Kazma
16	Ali Hassan	Al-Naser
17	Abdulrahman Al-Fadhli	Al-Salmiya
18	Youssef Al-Haqan	Qadsia
19	Youssef Nasser	Kuwait SC
20	Youssef Nasser	Kuwait SC
21	Youssef Al-Onaizan	Al-Salmiya
22	Youssef Al-Kandari	Al-Salmiya
23	Saud Al Hoshan	Kuwait SC

== See also ==
- 2025–26 Kuwaiti Division One
- 2025–26 Kuwait Super Cup
- 2025–26 Kuwait Emir Cup
- 2025–26 Kuwait Crown Prince Cup
- 2025–26 AFC Challenge League
- 2025–26 AGCFF Gulf Club Champions League
