= 2024–25 Borneo FC Samarinda season =

Borneo FC
2024–25 season
- Owner: PT Nahusam Pratama Indonesia
- Chairman: Nabil Husein
- Head coach: Pieter Huistra
- Stadium: Segiri Stadium; Batakan Stadium
- Liga 1: 3rd
Home colours	Away colours

The 2024–25 season is Borneo F.C. Samarinda's 10th competitive season. This season is Persib's 8th consecutive seasons in top-flight since promoted in 2017. The season covers the period from 9 August 2024 to June 2025. This season Borneo passes club license for ASEAN Club Championship and will playing in the competition for season 2024–25.

== Squad ==
As of 2 August 2023.

Squad No.	Name	Nationality	Date of birth (age)	Previous club	Contract since	Contract end
Goalkeepers
1	Angga Saputro	(Indonesia)	30 November 1993 (age 32)	(Indonesia) Persebaya Surabaya	2021	
25	Nadeo Argawinata	(Indonesia)	9 March 1997 (age 29)	(Indonesia) Bali United	2023	
63	Daffa Fasya	(Indonesia)	7 May 2004 (age 22)	Youth Team	2023	
Defenders
2	Ronaldo Rodrigues	(Brazil)	30 November 1993 (age 32)	(Portugal) Anadia	2024	
5	Gabriel Furtado	(Brazil)	9 December 1999 (age 26)	(Qatar) Mesaimeer	2024	
11	Gavin Kwan	(Indonesia) (United States)	5 April 1996 (age 30)	(Indonesia) Persis Solo	2024	
15	Leo Guntara	(Indonesia)	17 August 1994 (age 32)	(Indonesia) Semen Padang	2021	
16	Komang Teguh	(Indonesia)	28 April 2002 (age 24)	Youth Team	2020	
22	Christophe Nduwarugira	(Burundi)	22 June 1994 (age 32)	(Portugal) Académico de Viseu	2024	
24	Diego Michiels	(Indonesia) (Netherlands)	8 August 1990 (age 36)	(Indonesia) Arema	2022	
26	Rizdjar Nurviat	(Indonesia)	2 January 2006 (age 20)	Youth Team	2023	
54	Alfharezzi Buffon	(Indonesia)	28 April 2006 (age 20)	Youth Team	2023	
56	Fajar Fathur Rahman	(Indonesia)	29 May 2002 (age 24)	Youth Team	2020	
Midfielders
6	Ikhsan Zikrak	(Indonesia)	8 November 2002 (age 23)	(Indonesia) RANS Nusantara	2023	
8	Kei Hirose	(Japan)	20 November 1995 (age 30)	(Malaysia) Johor Darul Ta'zim II	2021	
12	Hendro Siswantok	(Indonesia)	12 March 1990 (age 36)	(Indonesia) Arema	2021	
33	Kenzo Nambu	(Japan)	22 August 1992 (age 34)	(Indonesia) Bali United	2025	
50	Rivaldo Enero	(Indonesia)	20 January 2003 (age 23)	Youth Team	2023	
55	Dandy Sonriza	(Indonesia)	22 November 2002 (age 23)	(Indonesia) Serpong City	2024	
66	Dwiky Hardiansyah	(Indonesia)	19 April 2004 (age 22)	Youth Team	2024	
77	Asgal Habib	(Indonesia)	8 July 2004 (age 22)	Youth Team	2024	
88	Dika Kuswardani	(Indonesia)	5 March 2003 (age 23)	(Indonesia) Persis Solo	2024	
97	Berguinho	(Brazil)	18 February 1997 (age 29)	(Brazil) Volta Redonda	2024	
99	Muhammad Sihran	(Indonesia)	8 March 1999 (age 27)	Youth Team	2017	
Strikers
7	Matheus Pato	(Brazil)	8 June 1995 (age 31)	(China) Shandong Taishan	2025	
14	Stefano Lilipaly	(Indonesia) (Netherlands)	10 January 1990 (age 36)	(Indonesia) Bali United	2022	
23	Mariano Peralta	(Argentina)	20 February 1998 (age 28)	(Uruguay) C.A. Cerro	2024	
28	Terens Puhiri	(Indonesia)	13 October 1996 (age 29)	(Thailand) Port	2015	
30	Andy Harjito	(Indonesia)	27 September 2001 (age 25)	(Indonesia) PSM Makassar	2022	
41	Ricky Cawor	(Indonesia)	26 January 1998 (age 28)	(Indonesia) PSS Sleman	2025	
Players who left mid-season
9	Léo Gaúcho	(Brazil)	3 August 2001 (age 25)	(Latvia) Valmiera	2024	
10	Lucas Salinas	(Brazil) (Spain)	14 October 1995 (age 30)	(Bahrain) Al-Khaldiya	2024	

== Technical & Coaching staff ==
Position	Name
President	(Indonesia) Purwati Lee
CEO	(Indonesia) Ponaryo Astaman
Team manager	(Indonesia) Farid Abubakar
Head coach	(Netherlands) Pieter Huistra
Assistant coaches	(Brazil) Demerson
Assistant coaches	(Indonesia) Sultan Samma
Fitness coach	(Bosnia and Herzegovina) Emir Mustafović
Goalkeeping coach	(Indonesia) Khairul Nizam
Analyst	(Indonesia) Gilang Ramadhan
Physiotherapists	(Brazil) Danilo Lima
Physiotherapists	(Indonesia) Fajar
Physiotherapists	(Indonesia) Ramdhan Pratama
Doctor	(Indonesia) Hilda Khoirun Nisa

== Transfer ==
=== Pre-season transfer ===
==== In ====
Position	Player	Transferred from	Ref
DF	(Burundi) Christophe Nduwarugira	(Portugal) Académico de Viseu	Free
DF	(Brazil) Ronaldo Rodrigues	(Portugal) Anadia	Free
DF	(Brazil) Gabriel Furtado	(Qatar) Mesaimeer	Free
DF	(Indonesia) Gavin Kwan	(Indonesia) Persis Solo	Free
DF	(Indonesia) Ari Maring	(Indonesia) PSIM Yogyakarta	Free (Note: Ari Maring sign for Borneo before moving to PSIM on season loan)
MF	(Indonesia) Dika Kuswardani	(Indonesia) Persis Solo	Free
MF	(Argentina) Mariano Peralta	(Uruguay) C.A. Cerro	Free
MF	(Brazil) Lucas Salinas	(Bahrain) Al-Khaldiya	Free
FW	(Brazil) Léo Gaúcho	(Latvia) Valmiera	Free
FW	(Brazil) Berguinho	(Brazil) Volta Redonda	Free

==== Out ====
Position	Player	Transferred To	Ref
DF	(Indonesia) Ucok Ahya	(Indonesia)	Free
DF	(Indonesia) Abdul Rachman	(Indonesia) Persiba Balikpapan	Free
DF	(Indonesia) Agung Prasetyo	(Indonesia) Bekasi City	Free
DF	(Indonesia) Jody Kurniady	(Indonesia) Bekasi City	Free
DF	(Brazil) Léo Lelis	(Indonesia) Persikabo 1973	Free
DF	(Portugal) Silvério Silva	(Portugal) Lusitânia	Free
MF	(Netherlands) Wiljan Pluim	(Netherlands) SV Epe	Free
MF	(Indonesia) Adam Alis	(Indonesia) Persib Bandung	Season loan
MF	(Indonesia) Taufany Muslihuddin	(Indonesia) Madura United	Season loan
MF	(Indonesia) Adittia Gigis	(Indonesia) PSIM Yogyakarta	Season loan
MF	(Indonesia) Tegar Islami	(Indonesia) PSIM Yogyakarta	Season loan
DF	(Indonesia) Ari Maring	(Indonesia) Bekasi City	Season loan
MF	(Indonesia) Misbakus Solikin	(Indonesia) Adhyaksa	Free
FW	(Indonesia) Ahmad Hardianto	(Indonesia) Persita Tangerang	Free
FW	(Indonesia) Yuda Editya	(Indonesia) Madura United	Free
FW	(Indonesia) Arya Gerryan	(Indonesia) PSIM Yogyakarta	Free
FW	(Indonesia) Rabbani Tasnim	(Indonesia) Persipal Palu	Free
FW	(Indonesia) Andy Harjito	(Indonesia) PSM Makassar	Season loan
FW	(Myanmar) Win Naing Tun	(Thailand) Chiangrai United	Free
FW	(Netherlands) Jelle Goselink	(Cambodia) Phnom Penh Crown	Free
FW	(Argentina) Felipe Cadenazzi	(Uruguay) Defensor Sporting	Free

=== Mid-season transfer ===
==== In ====
Position	Player	Transferred from	Ref
DF	(Indonesia) Ricky Cawor	(Indonesia) PSS Sleman	Free
DF	(Japan) Kenzo Nambu	(Indonesia) Bali United	Free
FW	(Indonesia) Andy Harjito	(Indonesia) PSM Makassar	Loan Return
FW	(Brazil) Matheus Pato	(China) Shandong Taishan	Free

==== Out ====
Position	Player	Transferred To	Ref
MF	(Brazil) (Spain) Lucas Salinas		Free
FW	(Brazil) Léo Gaúcho	(Turkey) Gençlerbirliği S.K.	Free

== Competitions ==
=== Liga 1 ===
12 August 2024 1	Semen Padang	1–3	Borneo FC	South Jakarta, Jakarta
	Kenneth Ngwoke 76'; Miftah Anwar Sani (yellow card) 44'	Report	Stefano Lilipaly 4'; Berguinho 39'; Léo Gaúcho 53'	Stadium: PTIK Stadium; Attendance: 165; Referee: Adham Makhadmeh (Jordan)

17 August 2024 2	Arema	0–2	Borneo FC	Blitar, East Java
	Pablo Oliveira (yellow card) 56'; Arkhan Fikri (yellow card) 81'; Hamzah Titofani (yellow card) 90+3'	Report	Christophe Nduwarugira 53'; Terens Puhiri 70' (yellow card) 76'; Berguinho (yellow card) 30'; Nadeo Argawinata (yellow card) 80'; Rivaldo Pakpahan (yellow card) 82'; Muhammad Sihran (yellow card) 90+3'	Stadium: Gelora Supriyadi Stadium; Attendance: 839; Referee: Tommi Manggopa

27 August 2024 3	Borneo FC	2–0	Bali United	Balikpapan, East Kalimantan
	Christophe Nduwarugira 41'; Mariano Peralta 73'; Rivaldo Pakpahan (yellow card) 31'; Berguinho (yellow card) 77'	Report	Made Andhika (yellow card) 26'; Privat Mbarga (yellow card) 44'; Rahmat Arjuna (yellow card) 80'	Stadium: Batakan Stadium; Attendance: 1,917; Referee: Nendi Rohaendi

12 September 2024 4	PSS Sleman	1–1	Borneo FC	Solo, Central Java
	Christophe Nduwarugira 77' (o.g.); Wahyudi Hamisi (yellow card) 83'	Report	Léo Gaúcho 25' (yellow card) 80'; Nadeo Argawinata (red card) 12'; Alex Mos (yellow card) 90+3'	Stadium: Manahan Stadium; Attendance: 2,002; Referee: Erfan Efendi

17 September 2024 5	Borneo FC	1–0	Malut Untied	Balikpapan, East Kalimantan
	Mariano Peralta 77'; Leo Guntara (yellow card) 83'	Report	Victor Mansaray (yellow card) 58'; Tatsuro Nagamatsu (yellow card) 73'	Stadium: Batakan Stadium; Attendance: 1,492; Referee: Asep Yandis

23 September 2024 6	Barito Putera	1–1	Borneo FC	Bantul, Yogyakarta
	Lévy Madinda 74'; Aditiya Daffa (yellow card) 33'; Yuswanto Aditya (yellow card) 80'; Moon Chi-Sung (yellow card) 83'	Report	Léo Gaúcho 34' (pen.); Rivaldo Pakpahan (yellow card) 40'; Berguinho (yellow card) 47'	Stadium: Sultan Agung; Attendance: 0 Referee: Eko Saputra

30 September 2024 7	Borneo FC	0–0	Persita Tangerang	Balikpapan, East Kalimantan
	Fajar Fathur Rahman (yellow card) 38'	Report		Stadium: Batakan Stadium; Attendance: 928; Referee: Aprisman Aranda

19 October 2024 8	Persis Solo	3–2	Borneo FC	Solo, Central Java
	Moussa Sidibé 34' (yellow card) 24'; Karim Rossi 76'; Arkhan Kaka 90' (yellow card) 90+2'; Faqih Maulana (yellow card) 18'; Gonzalo Andrada (yellow card) 72'; Chairul Basalamah (yellow card) 25'	Report	Gabriel Furtado 15' (yellow card) 24'; Léo Gaúcho 43'; Dwiky Hardiansyah (yellow card) 45'; Emir Mustafovic (yellow card) 25'	Stadium: Manahan Stadium; Attendance: 3,989; Referee: Heru Cahyono

25 October 2024 9	Borneo FC	3–0	PSBS Biak	Balikpapan, East Kalimantan
	Mariano Peralta 6'; Léo Gaúcho 20', 87'; Kei Hirose (yellow card) 57'	Report	Meshaal Hamzah Bashier Osman (yellow card) 14'; Fabiano Beltrame (yellow card) 60'; Muhammad Tahir (yellow card) 89'	Stadium: Batakan Stadium; Attendance: 742; Referee: Muhammad Tri Santoso

2 November 2024 10	Borneo FC	1–0	Dewa United	Balikpapan, East Kalimantan
19:00	Berguinho 73'; Stefano Lilipaly (yellow card) 18'; Gabriel Furtado (yellow card) 41'; Komang Teguh (yellow card) 45+3'	Report	Alexis Messidoro (red card) 30'	Stadium: Batakan Stadium; Attendance: 1,519; Referee: Axel Febrian Sinaga

22 November 2024 11	Persib	1–0	Borneo FC	Soreang, West Java
	Ciro Alves 34'; Mateo Kocijan (yellow card) 53'; Kakang Rudianto (yellow card) 54'; Nick Kuipers (yellow card) 60'	Report	Mariano Peralta (yellow card) 21'; Léo Gaúcho (yellow card) 34'; Gabriel Furtado (yellow card) 45'; Leo Guntara (yellow card) 90+5'	Stadium: Si Jalak Harupat Stadium; Attendance: 3,980; Referee: Candra

2 December 2024 12	PSM	1–0	Borneo FC	Balikpapan, East Kalimantan
	Latyr Fall 16'; Yuran (yellow card) 36'; Hilmansyah (yellow card) 45'; Daisuke Sakai (yellow card) 85'; Muhammad Ardiansyah (yellow card) 90+8'	Report	Fajar Fathur Rahman (yellow card) 44'; Christophe Nduwarugira (yellow card) 68'; Dandy Sonriza (yellow card) 81'; Terens Puhiri (yellow card) 90+3'	Stadium: Batakan Stadium; Attendance: 1,071; Referee: Sance Lawita

6 December 2024 13	Borneo FC	0–0	PSIS Semarang	Balikpapan, East Kalimantan
	Ronaldo Rodrigues (yellow card) 71'; Christophe Nduwarugira (yellow card) 84'; Fajar Fathur Rahman (yellow card) 90+5'	Report	Ruxi (yellow card) 57'; Alfeandra Dewangga (yellow card) 85'; Evandro Brandão (yellow card) 86'; Adi Satryo (yellow card) 90+7'	Stadium: Batakan Stadium; Attendance: 609; Referee: Agung Setiyawan

10 December 2024 14	Persija Jakarta	1–1	Borneo FC	North Jakarta, Jakarta
	Gustavo 86'; Ondřej Kúdela (red card) 37'	Report	Habibi Jusuf 90+9'; Christophe Nduwarugira (yellow card) 21'; Hendro Siswanto (yellow card) 47'; Terens Puhiri (yellow card) 63'	Stadium: Jakarta International Stadium; Attendance: 6,723; Referee: Yudi Nurcahya

14 December 2024 15	Borneo FC	5–0	Madura United	Balikpapan, East Kalimantan
	Terens Puhiri 4'; Habibi Jusuf 39', 42'; Stefano Lilipaly 45'; Léo Gaúcho 90+4'; Hendro Siswanto (yellow card) 29'	Report		Stadium: Batakan Stadium; Attendance: 845; Referee: Muhammad Iqballuddin

20 December 2024 16	Persebaya Surabaya	2–1	Borneo FC	Surabaya, East Java
	Francisco Israel Rivera 17', 29'; Flávio Silva (yellow card) 74'; Kasim Botan (yellow card) 79'	Report	Ronaldo Rodrigues 32' (yellow card) 49'; Nadeo Argawinata (red card) 45'	Stadium: Gelora Bung Tomo Stadium; Attendance: 10,931; Referee: Tommi Manggopa

27 December 2024 17	Borneo FC	0–4	Persik Kediri	Balikpapan, East Kalimantan
	Kei Hirose (red card) 19'; Leo Guntara (yellow card) 45'	Report	Ronaldo Rodrigues 36' (o.g.); Rifqi Ray Farandi 50'; Yusuf Meilana 56'; Riyatno Abiyoso 86'; Brendon Lucas (yellow card) 45+1'; Kiko (yellow card) 79'; Majed Osman (yellow card) 83'	Stadium: Batakan Stadium; Attendance: 1,146; Referee: Muhammad Tri Santoso

14 January 2025 18	Borneo FC	1–3	Semen Padang	Balikpapan, East Kalimantan
	Leo Guntara 39' (yellow card) 45+1'; Dwiky Hardiansyah (yellow card) 43' (yellow-red card) 47'	Report	Filipe Chaby 49'; Bruno Gomes 73'; Cornelius Stewart 76'; Arthur (yellow card) 90+6'	Stadium: Batakan Stadium; Attendance: 628; Referee: Ko Hyung-jin

19 January 2025 19	Borneo FC	3–1	Arema	Balikpapan, East Kalimantan
	Stefano Lilipaly 26', 62'; Habibi Jusuf 45'; Komang Teguh (yellow card) 30'; Alfharezzi Buffon (yellow card) 36'	Report	Dalberto 49'	Stadium: Batakan Stadium; Attendance: 1,345; Referee: Nendi Rohaendi

28 January 2025 20	Bali United	3–2	Borneo FC	Gianyar, Bali
	Rahmat Arjuna 48'; Boris Kopitović 58' (yellow card) 69'; Muhammad Rachmat 66'	Report	Berguinho 72'; Matheus Pato 84' (pen.); Ricky Cawor (yellow card) 20'; Gabriel Furtado (red card) 57'; Diego Michiels (yellow card) 70'	Stadium: Kapten I Wayan Dipta; Attendance: 6,218; Referee: Axel Febrian Sinaga

2 February 2025 21	Borneo FC	1–0	PSS Sleman	Balikpapan, East Kalimantan
	Dwiky Hardiansyah 8'; Rivaldo Pakpahan (yellow card) 22'; Stefano Lilipaly (yellow card) 68'; Habibi Jusuf (red card) 70'; Mariano Peralta (yellow card) 90+2'; Nadeo Argawinata (yellow card) 90+8'	Report	Riko Simanjuntak (yellow card) 7'; Jayus Hariono (yellow card) 52'; Vico (yellow card) 85'	Stadium: Batakan Stadium; Attendance: 951; Referee: Rio Permana Putra

10 February 2025 22	Malut United	3–0	Borneo FC	Ternate, North Maluku
	Adriano Castanheira 38' (pen.), 45+3'; Júnior Brandão 90+10' (pen.); Sony Norde (yellow card) 53'; Jonathan Bustos (yellow card) 89'; Fredyan Wahyu (yellow card) 90'	Report		Stadium: Gelora Kie Raha Stadium; Attendance: 4,020; Referee: Agung Setiyawan

16 February 2025 23	Borneo FC	2–1	Barito Putera	Balikpapan, East Kalimantan
	Matheus Pato 16', 45+4' (pen.); Fajar Fathur Rahman (yellow card) 22'; Diego Michiels (red card) 90+3'	Report	Anderson 23'; Matías Mier (yellow card) 67'; Renan Alves (yellow card) 87'	Stadium: Batakan Stadium; Attendance: 10,135; Referee: Heru Cahyono

22 February 2025 24	Persita Tangerang	1–2	Borneo FC	Kelapa Dua, Java
	Éber Bessa 69'; Tamirlan Kozubaev (yellow card) 23'; Sandro Anibal (yellow card) 43'	Report	Matheus Pato 13' (pen.); Mariano Peralta 50'	Stadium: Indomilk Arena; Attendance: 3,631; Referee: Steven Yubel Poli

2 March 2025 25	Borneo FC	0–1	Persis Solo	Balikpapan, East Kalimantan
	Christophe Nduwarugira (yellow card) 21'; Matheus Pato (penalty missed) 74; Ronaldo (yellow card) 87'; Gavin Kwan (yellow card) 90+7'	Report	Jhon Cley 21'; Gianluca Pandeynuwu (yellow card) 31'; Rizky Dwi Febrianto (yellow card) 77'	Stadium: Batakan Stadium; Attendance: 8,518; Referee: Mohd Tri Santoso

6 March 2025 26	PSBS Biak	1–0	Borneo FC	Jayapura, Papua
	Abel Argañaraz 80'; Takuya Matsunaga (yellow card) 37'; Julián Velázquez (yellow card) 90+2'	Report	Ronaldo (yellow card) 17'	Stadium: Mandala Stadium

10 March 2025 27	Dewa United	0–1	Borneo FC	Bogor, West Java
	Ângelo Meneses (yellow card) 42' (yellow-red card) 58'; Alexis Messidoro (yellow card) 71'; Alex Martins (yellow card) 90+5'	Report	Kei Hirose 3'; Leo Guntara (yellow card) 71'; Gabriel Furtado (yellow card) 85'; Habibi Jusuf (yellow card) 90+5'	Stadium: Pakansari Stadium; Attendance: 453; Referee: Aidil Azmi

11 April 2025 28	Borneo FC	2–2	Persib	Balikpapan, East Kalimantan
	Mariano Peralta 28', 86' (yellow card) 62'; Kenzo Nambu (yellow card) 72'; Christophe Nduwarugira (yellow card) 90+4'	Report	Tyronne del Pino 44' (pen.), 51' (yellow card) 66'; Nick Kuipers (yellow card) 34'; Adam Alis (yellow card) 64'; Ahmad Agung (yellow card) 90+6'	Stadium: Batakan Stadium; Attendance: 9,426; Referee: Muhammad Taqi (Singapore)

18 April 2025 29	Borneo FC	1–1	PSM Makassar	Balikpapan, East Kalimantan
	Habibi Jusuf 30'; Fajar Fathur Rahman (yellow card) 74'	Report	Yuran 80' (pen.) (yellow card) 87'; Abdul Rahman (yellow card) 90'	Stadium: Batakan Stadium; Attendance: 6,691; Referee: Sance Lawita

25 April 2025 30	PSIS Semarang	2–5	Borneo FC	Semarang, Central Java
	Sandy Ferizal 54'; João Ferrari 66'; Alfeandra Dewangga (yellow card) 53'; Boubakary Diarra (yellow card) 59'	Report	Mariano Peralta 9', 90+6'; Berguinho 19'; Ronaldo 40'; Habibi Jusuf 45+2'; Diego Michaels (yellow card) 90+4'	Stadium: Jatidiri Stadium; Attendance: 150; Referee: Totok Fitrianto

4 May 2025 31	Borneo FC	1–0	Persija Jakarta	Balikpapan, East Kalimantan
	Muhammad Sihran 25'; Rivaldo Pakpahan (yellow card) 4'	Report	Resky Fandi (yellow card) 74'; Witan Sulaeman (yellow card) 90+2'	Stadium: Batakan Stadium; Attendance: 8,388; Referee: Yudi Nurcahya

10 May 2025 32	Madura United	2–3	Borneo FC	Pamekasan Regency, East Java
	Youssef Ezzejjari 51'; Taufik Hidayat 56'; Brayan Angulo (yellow card) 6'; Haudi Abdillah (yellow card) 38'; Andi Irfan (yellow card) 64'; Lulinha (penalty missed) 90+11	Report	Mariano Peralta 45+2'; Ronaldo 68'; Stefano Lilipaly 85'; Muhammad Sihran (yellow card) 14'; Leo Guntara (yellow card) 64'; Alfharezzi Buffon (yellow card) 69' (yellow-red card) 85'; Matheus Pato (yellow card) 90+9'; Terens Puhiri (yellow card) 90+9'	Stadium: Gelora Ratu Pamelingan Stadium; Attendance: 904; Referee: Rio Permana Putra

18 May 2025 33	Borneo FC	1–1	Persebaya Surabaya	Balikpapan, East Kalimantan
	Matheus Pato 77' (pen.)	Report	Bruno 61' (pen.); Ernando Ari (yellow card) 67' (red card) 74'	Stadium: Batakan Stadium; Attendance: 8,841; Referee: Candra

24 May 2025 34	Persik Kediri	1–2	Borneo FC	Kediri, East Java
	Ramiro Fergonzi 77'; Adi Eko Jayanto (yellow card) 57'		Stefano Lilipaly 19'; Matheus Pato 45+3'; Ronaldo (yellow card) 10' (yellow-red card) 76'; Gabriel Furtado (yellow card) 51'	Stadium: Brawijaya Stadium

Pos	Team	Pld	W	D	L	GF	GA	GD	Pts	Qualification or relegation
1	Persib (C)	34	19	12	3	60	33	+27	69	Qualification for the 2025–26 AFC Champions League Two qualifying play-offs
2	Dewa United	34	17	10	7	65	33	+32	61	Qualification for the 2025–26 AFC Challenge League group stage
3	Malut United	34	15	12	7	48	33	+15	57	
4	Persebaya	34	15	11	8	41	38	+3	56 (Note: Ranked on head-to-head points: Persebaya 4, Borneo Samarinda 1.)	
5	Borneo Samarinda	34	16	8	10	50	38	+12	56	
6	PSM	34	13	14	7	47	34	+13	53	
7	Persija	34	14	9	11	47	38	+9	51	
8	Bali United	34	14	8	12	50	41	+9	50	
9	PSBS	34	13	9	12	44	47	−3	48	
10	Arema	34	13	8	13	53	51	+2	47	
11	Persita	34	12	7	15	32	43	−11	43	
12	Persik	34	10	11	13	40	42	−2	41	
13	Semen Padang	34	9	9	16	38	60	−22	36 (Note: Ranked on head-to-head points: Semen Padang 8, Persis 5, Madura United 3.)	
14	Persis	34	9	9	16	34	46	−12	36	
15	Madura United	34	10	6	18	36	58	−22	36	
16	PSS (Note: PSS was deducted three points by the PSSI Disciplinary Committee due to the match fixing case in the 2018 Liga 2.) (R)	34	11	4	19	43	50	−7	34 (Note: Tied on head-to-head points. Ranked on head-to-head goal differences: PSS +2, Barito Putera –2.)	Relegation to the 2025–26 Championship
17	Barito Putera (R)	34	8	10	16	42	57	−15	34	Relegation to the 2025–26 Championship
18	PSIS (R)	34	6	7	21	29	57	−28	25	Relegation to the 2025–26 Championship

Source: Liga 1 2024–25
Rules for classification: 1) Points; 2) Head-to-head points; 3) Head-to-head goal difference; 4) Head-to-head goals scored; 5) Goal difference; 6) Goals scored; 7) Fair-play points; 8) Drawing of lots.
(C) Champions; (R) Relegated

=== ASEAN Club Championship ===
==== Group stage ====
Pos	Team	Pld	W	D	L	GF	GA	GD	Pts	Qualification	CAH	BUR	KLC	BOR	LCS	KAY
1	(Vietnam) Cong An Hanoi	5	5	0	0	15	6	+9	15	Advance to Semi-finals		2–1		3–2	5–0	
2	(Thailand) Buriram United	5	3	1	1	13	2	+11	10	Advance to Semi-finals			1–0	4–0		7–0
3	(Malaysia) Kuala Lumpur City	5	2	0	3	4	6	−2	6 (Note: Ranked on head-to-head points: Kuala Lumpur City (3); Borneo (0).)		2–3			1–0		1–0
4	(Indonesia) Borneo	5	2	0	3	7	9	−2	6						3–0	2–1
5	(Singapore) Lion City Sailors	5	1	1	3	2	10	−8	4			0–0	2–0			
6	(Philippines) Kaya–Iloilo	5	1	0	4	4	12	−8	3		1–2				2–0	

Source: ASEAN United FC
Rules for classification: Tiebreakers
Notes:

22 August 2024 Matchday 1	Borneo F.C. (Indonesia)	3–0	(Singapore) Lion City Sailors	Balikpapan
	Léo Gaúcho 3', 80'; Berguinho 20'	Report	Rui Pires (red card) 52'	Stadium: Batakan Stadium; Referee: Ko Hyung-jin (South Korea)

26 September 2024 Matchday 2	Kuala Lumpur City (Malaysia)	1–0	(Indonesia) Borneo F.C.	Kuala Lumpur
21:00 UTC+8	Brendan 77'; Paulo Josué (yellow card) 7'; Kenny Pallraj (yellow card) 37'	Report	Léo Gaúcho (yellow card) 84'	Stadium: Kuala Lumpur Stadium; Referee: Omar Al-Yaqoubi (Oman)

9 January 2025 Matchday 3	Buriram United (Thailand)	4–0	(Indonesia) Borneo F.C.	Buriram
19:30 UTC+7	Lucas Crispim 25'; Guilherme Bissoli 27'; Marcelo Djaló 45+2'; Ratthanakorn Maikami 87'	Report	Komang Teguh (yellow card) 74'	Stadium: Chang Arena; Referee: Hiroki Kasahara (Japan)

23 January 2025 Matchday 4	Borneo F.C. (Indonesia)	2–1	(Philippines) Kaya–Iloilo	Balikpapan
	Mariano Peralta 28' (red card) 90+4'; Dwiky Hardiansyah 90+1'	Report	Jesus Melliza 82'; Shuto Komaki (yellow card) 85'	Stadium: Batakan Stadium; Referee: Firdavs Norsafarov (Uzbekistan)

6 February 2025 Matchday 5	Cong An Hanoi (Vietnam)	3–2	(Indonesia) Borneo F.C.	Hanoi, Vietnam
	Lê Văn Đô 20'; Nguyễn Đình Bắc 81'; Léo Artur 90+1'; Giáp Tuấn Dương (yellow card) 50'		Habibi Jusuf 45+1'; Gavin Kwan 88'; Christophe Nduwarugira (yellow card) 88'	Stadium: Hàng Đẫy Stadium; Referee: Chae Sang-hyeop (South Korea)

== Team statistics ==
=== Appearances and goals ===
23 May 2025

No.	Pos.	Player	Liga 1		ASEAN Club Championship		Total	
No.	Pos.	Player	Apps.	Goals	Apps.	Goals	Apps.	Goals
1	GK	(Indonesia) Angga Saputro	3+2	0	0	0	5	0
2	DF	(Brazil) Ronaldo Rodrigues	23+2	3	5	0	30	3
5	MF	(Brazil) Gabriel Furtado	20+5	1	2	0	27	1
6	MF	(Indonesia) Ikhsan Zikrak	3+11	0	0+3	0	17	0
7	FW	(Brazil) Matheus Pato	10+7	6	0	0	17	6
8	MF	(Japan) Kei Hirose	31	1	5	0	35	1
10	MF	(Brazil) Lucas Salinas	0+6	0	0	0	6	0
11	DF	(Indonesia) (United States) Gavin Kwan	0+4	0	0+1	1	5	1
12	MF	(Indonesia) Hendro Siswanto	5+11	0	1+2	0	19	0
14	FW	(Indonesia) (Netherlands) Stefano Lilipaly	20+4	6	4	0	28	6
15	DF	(Indonesia) Leo Guntara	24+6	1	4	0	34	1
16	DF	(Indonesia) Komang Teguh	4+11	0	1+3	0	19	0
22	DF	(Burundi) Christophe Nduwarugira	31+2	2	5	0	38	2
23	FW	(Argentina) Mariano Peralta	32+1	8	2	1	35	9
24	DF	(Indonesia) (Netherlands) Diego Michiels	3+8	0	0	0	11	0
25	GK	(Indonesia) Nadeo Argawinata	29	0	5	0	34	0
26	DF	(Indonesia) Rizdjar Nurviat	0+2	0	0	0	2	0
28	FW	(Indonesia) Terens Puhiri	5+15	2	3	0	23	2
30	FW	(Indonesia) Andy Harjito	0+2	0	0	0	2	0
33	MF	(Japan) Kenzo Nambu	4+5	0	0	0	9	0
41	FW	(Indonesia) Ricky Cawor	2+6	0	0	0	8	0
50	DF	(Indonesia) Rivaldo Pakpahan	23+2	0	3	0	28	0
54	MF	(Indonesia) Alfharezzi Buffon	3+6	0	1+1	0	11	0
55	MF	(Indonesia) Dandy Sonriza	1+8	0	0+3	0	12	0
56	MF	(Indonesia) Fajar Fathur Rahman	32+1	0	5	0	38	0
63	GK	(Indonesia) Daffa Fasya	2	0	0	0	2	0
66	MF	(Indonesia) Dwiky Hardiansyah	4+6	1	1+1	1	12	2
68	MF	(Indonesia) Habibi Jusuf	8+10	6	2+1	1	21	7
77	FW	(Indonesia) Asgal Habib	0+1	0	0+1	0	2	0
88	MF	(Indonesia) Dika Kuswardani	3+5	0	0	0	8	0
97	MF	(Brazil) Berguinho	25+3	4	2	1	30	5
99	MF	(Indonesia) Muhammad Sihran	7+7	1	1+3	0	18	1
Players who have played this season and/or sign for the season but had left the club permanently
9	FW	(Brazil) Léo Gaúcho	15+2	7	2	2	19	9
