= Jordan at the FIFA World Cup =

International football delegation

Jordan appeared in the FIFA World Cup for the first time in 2026. On 5 June 2025, they qualified for the finals for the first time after 3–0 away victory over Oman.

== Overall record ==
FIFA World Cup record									Qualification record					
Year	Round	Position	Pld	W	D*	L	GF	GA	Pld	W	D	L	GF	GA
1930 to 1954	Not a FIFA member								Not a FIFA member					
1958 to 1982	Did not enter								Did not enter					
(Mexico) 1986	Did not qualify								4	1	0	3	3	7
(Italy) 1990	Did not qualify								6	2	1	3	5	7
(United States) 1994	Did not qualify								8	2	3	3	12	15
(France) 1998	Did not qualify								4	1	1	2	4	4
(South Korea) (Japan) 2002	Did not qualify								6	2	2	2	12	7
(Germany) 2006	Did not qualify								6	4	0	2	10	6
(South Africa) 2010	Did not qualify								8	3	1	4	8	8
(Brazil) 2014	Did not qualify								20	8	5	7	30	31
(Russia) 2018	Did not qualify								8	5	1	2	21	7
(Qatar) 2022	Did not qualify								8	4	2	2	13	3
(Canada) (Mexico) (United States) 2026	Group stage	44th	3	0	0	3	3	8	16	8	5	3	32	11
(Morocco) (Portugal) (Spain) 2030	To be determined								To be determined					
(Saudi Arabia) 2034	To be determined								To be determined					
Total	Group stage	1/17	3	0	0	3	3	8	93	40	21	32	150	106

== List of matches ==
Year	Round	Opponent	Score	Jordan scorers
(Canada) (Mexico) (United States) 2026	Group J	Austria	1–3	Olwan
(Canada) (Mexico) (United States) 2026	Group J	Algeria	1–2	Al-Rashdan
(Canada) (Mexico) (United States) 2026	Group J	Argentina	1–3	Al-Taamari

== 2026 FIFA World Cup ==
=== Group stage ===
Pos	Team	Pld	W	D	L	GF	GA	GD	Pts	Qualification
1	Argentina	3	3	0	0	8	1	+7	9	Advance to knockout stage
2	Austria	3	1	1	1	6	6	0	4 (Note: Tied on head-to-head result (Algeria 3–3 Austria). Overall goal difference was used as the tiebreaker.)	Advance to knockout stage
3	Algeria	3	1	1	1	5	7	−2	4	Advance to knockout stage
4	Jordan	3	0	0	3	3	8	−5	0	

Source: FIFA
Notes:
June 16, 2026
9:00 p.m. UTC−7

Austria	3–1	Jordan
Schmid 20'; Al-Arab 76' (o.g.); Arnautović 90+12' (pen.)	(Note: "Austria vs Jordan | First Stage | FIFA World Cup 2026". FIFA. Retrieved June 16, 2026.; "Match Report – Group J – Austria v. Jordan". FIFA. Retrieved June 17, 2026.; "Post match summary report – Group J – Austria v. Jordan". FIFA. June 17, 2026. Retrieved June 28, 2026.)	Olwan 50'

Levi's Stadium, Santa Clara
Attendance: 68,527
Referee: Dahane Beida (Mauritania)

June 22, 2026
8:00 p.m. UTC−7

Jordan	1–2	Algeria
Al-Rashdan 36'	(Note: "Jordan vs Algeria | First Stage | FIFA World Cup 2026". FIFA. Retrieved June 22, 2026.; "Match Report – Group J – Jordan v. Algeria". FIFA. June 23, 2026. Retrieved June 23, 2026.; "Post match summary report – Group J – Jordan v. Algeria". FIFA. June 23, 2026. Retrieved June 23, 2026.)	Benbouali 69'; Gouiri 82'

Levi's Stadium, Santa Clara
Attendance: 68,371
Referee: Slavko Vinčić (Slovenia)

June 27, 2026
9:00 p.m. UTC−5

Jordan	1–3	Argentina
Al-Taamari 55'	(Note: "Jordan vs Argentina | First Stage | FIFA World Cup 2026". FIFA. Retrieved June 28, 2026.; "Match Report – Group J – Jordan v. Argentina". FIFA. June 28, 2026. Retrieved June 28, 2026.; "Post match summary report – Group J – Jordan v. Argentina". FIFA. June 28, 2026. Retrieved June 28, 2026.)	Lo Celso 19'; La. Martínez 31' (pen.); Messi 80'

AT&T Stadium, Arlington
Attendance: 70,649
Referee: István Kovács (Romania)

== Goalscorers ==
On 16 June 2026, Ali Olwan scored Jordan's first-ever goal at a FIFA World Cup, coming in the 50th minute of their opening match against Austria in the San Francisco Bay Area.

Player	Goals	2026
Ali Olwan	1	1
Nizar Al-Rashdan	1	1
Musa Al-Taamari	1	1
Total	3	3

== Jordan records and statistics ==
- Most consecutive World Cup appearances: 1 - 2026-present
- Most consecutive failed qualification attempts: 10 - 1986-2022
- Longest losing streak: 3 - 2026-present
- Worst results: 44th place - 2026
- Oldest Jordan player: 34 years and 161 days - Salim Obaid - v Argentina, 27 June 2026
- Youngest Jordan player: 20 years and 206 days - Odeh Al-Fakhouri - v Austria, 16 June 2026
- Oldest Jordan player score the goal: 29 years and 17 days - Musa Al-Taamari - v Argentina, 27 June 2026
- Youngest Jordan player score the goal: 26 years and 82 days - Ali Olwan - v Austria, 16 June 2026
- Most appearances: 3 - (13 player) - 2026
  - Mohannad Abu Taha - 2026
  - Yazeed Abulaila - 2026
  - Yazan Al-Arab - 2026
  - Mahmoud Al-Mardi - 2026
  - Nizar Al-Rashdan - 2026
  - Noor Al-Rawabdeh - 2026
  - Mousa Al-Tamari - 2026
  - Ali Azaizeh - 2026
  - Odeh Al-Fakhouri - 2026
  - Ehsan Haddad - 2026
  - Abdallah Nasib - 2026
  - Salim Obaid - 2026
  - Ali Olwan - 2026
- Most appearances by a captain: 3 - Ihsan Haddad - 2026
- Most appearances by a goalkeepers: 3 - Yazeed Abulaila - 2026
- Most appearances as a substitutions: 3 - Salim Obaid - 2026
- Most Man of the Match: 1 - Ali Olwan - 2026
- Biggest wins: 0 - None
- Biggest defeat: 2 (2 times)
  - v Austria, 16 June 2026
  - v Argentina, 27 June 2026
- Most goals in a game: 1 - (3 times)
  - v Austria, 16 June 2026
  - v Algeria, 22 June 2026
  - v Argentina, 27 June 2026
- Most goals in first half: 1 - v Algeria, 22 June 2026
- Most goals in second half: 1 - (2 times)
  - v Austria, 16 June 2026
  - v Argentina, 27 June 2026
- Most goals conceded in a game: 3 - (2 times)
  - v Austria, 16 June 2026
  - v Argentina, 27 June 2026
- Most goals conceded in first half: 2 - v Argentina, 27 June 2026
- Most goals conceded in second half: 2 - (2 times)
  - v Austria, 16 June 2026
  - v Algeria, 22 June 2026
- Most goals by both teams in a game: 4 - (2 times)
  - 1 for Jordan v 3 for Austria, 16 June 2026
  - 1 for Jordan v 3 for Argentina, 27 June 2026
- Fewest goals by both teams in a game: 3 - 1 for Jordan v 2 for Algeria, 22 June 2026
- Most goals by both teams in first half: 2 - 0 for Jordan v 2 for Argentina, 27 June 2026
- Most goals by both teams in second half: 3 - 1 for Jordan v 2 for Austria, 16 June 2026
- Most goals by a player in a match: 1 - (3 times)
  - Ali Olwan v Austria, 16 June 2026
  - Nizar Al-Rashdan v Algeria, 22 June 2026
  - Musa Al-Taamari v Argentina, 27 June 2026
- Most goals by a player in first half: 1 - Nizar Al-Rashdan - v Algeria, 22 June 2026
- Most goals by a player in second half: 1 - (2 times)
  - Ali Olwan v Austria, 16 June 2026
  - Musa Al-Taamari v Argentina, 27 June 2026
- Most goals by a substitutions player in a match: 1 - Musa Al-Taamari - v Argentina, 27 June 2026
- Most goals by a opponent player in a match: 1 - (8 times)
  - Romano Schmid v Austria, 16 June 2026
  - Yazan Al-Arab v Austria, 16 June 2026
  - Marko Arnautović v Austria, 16 June 2026
  - Nadhir Benbouali v Algeria, 22 June 2026
  - Amine Gouiri v Algeria, 22 June 2026
  - Giovani Lo Celso v Argentina, 27 June 2026
  - Lautaro Martínez v Argentina, 27 June 2026
  - Lionel Messi v Argentina, 27 June 2026
- Most goals by a opponent player in first half: 1 - (3 times)
  - Romano Schmid v Austria, 16 June 2026
  - Giovani Lo Celso v Argentina, 27 June 2026
  - Lautaro Martínez v Argentina, 27 June 2026
- Most goals by a opponent player in second half: 1 - (5 times)
  - Yazan Al-Arab v Austria, 16 June 2026
  - Marko Arnautović v Austria, 16 June 2026
  - Nadhir Benbouali v Algeria, 22 June 2026
  - Amine Gouiri v Algeria, 22 June 2026
  - Lionel Messi v Argentina, 27 June 2026
- Most goals by a substitutions opponent player in a match: 1 - (3 times)
  - Marko Arnautović v Austria, 16 June 2026
  - Nadhir Benbouali v Algeria, 22 June 2026
  - Lionel Messi v Argentina, 27 June 2026
- Most consecutive matches without being shutout: 3 - 2026-present
- Most consecutive matches without clean sheets: 3 - Yazeed Abulaila - 2026-present
- Opponent player own goal scored: 1 - Yazan Al-Arab - v Austria, 16 June 2026
- Opponent player awarded penalty kick: 1 - (2 times)
  - Marko Arnautović v Austria, 16 June 2026 (102nd minutes) (goal)
  - Lautaro Martínez v Argentina, 27 June 2026 (31st minutes) (goal)
- Opponent player free kick goals: 1 - Lionel Messi - v Argentina, 27 June 2026 (80th minutes)
- Fastest goal: 36th minute - Nizar Al-Rashdan - v Algeria, 22 June 2026
- Latest goal: 55th minute - Musa Al-Taamari - v Argentina, 27 June 2026
- Fastest goal conceded: 19th minute - Giovani Lo Celso - v Argentina, 27 June 2026
- Latest goal conceded: 90+12th minute - Marko Arnautović - v Austria, 16 June 2026
- Longest goalless streak: 109 minute - 22 June 2026 to 27 June 2026
- Longest clean sheet streak: 69 minute - v Algeria, 22 June 2026
- Most clean sheet: 0 - None
- Most saves in a match: 6 - Yazeed Abulaila - v Algeria, 22 June 2026
- Most saves in one half: 4 - Yazeed Abulaila - v Algeria, 22 June 2026 (2nd half)
- Most saves by a opponent in a match: 3 - (2 times)
  - Alexander Schlager - v Austria, 16 June 2026
  - Luca Zidane - v Algeria, 22 June 2026
- Most saves by a opponent in one half: 3 - Alexander Schlager - v Austria, 16 June 2026 (1st half)
- Most goals conceded by a goalkeeper in a match: 3 - (2 times)
  - Yazeed Abulaila v Austria, 16 June 2026
  - Yazeed Abulaila v Argentina, 27 June 2026
- Most goals conceded by a goalkeeper in first half: 2 - Yazeed Abulaila - v Argentina, 27 June 2026
- Most goals conceded by a goalkeeper in second half: 2 - (2 times)
  - Yazeed Abulaila v Austria, 16 June 2026
  - Yazeed Abulaila v Algeria, 22 June 2026
- Most goals conceded by a opponent goalkeeper in a match: 1 - (3 times)
  - Alexander Schlager v Austria, 16 June 2026
  - Luca Zidane v Algeria, 22 June 2026
  - Emiliano Martínez v Argentina, 27 June 2026
- Most goals conceded by a opponent goalkeeper in first half: 1 - Luca Zidane - v Algeria, 22 June 2026
- Most goals conceded by a opponent goalkeeper in second half: 1 - (2 times)
  - Alexander Schlager v Austria, 16 June 2026
  - Emiliano Martínez v Argentina, 27 June 2026
- Most yellow card in a match: 3 - v Argentina, 27 June 2026
- Most yellow card in one half: 2 - v Argentina, 27 June 2026 (2nd half)
- Most yellow card by a opponent in a match: 1 - (2 times)
  - v Austria, 16 June 2026
  - v Algeria, 22 June 2026
- Most yellow card by a opponent in one half: 1 - (2 times)
  - v Austria, 16 June 2026 (2nd half)
  - v Algeria, 22 June 2026 (1st half)
- Most yellow card by both teams in a match: 3 - 3 for Jordan v 0 for Argentina, 27 June 2026
- Most yellow card by both teams in one half: 2 - 2 for Jordan v 0 for Argentina, 27 June 2026 (2nd half)
- Fewest yellow card by both teams in a match: 1 - 0 for Jordan v 1 for Austria, 16 June 2026
- Fastest yellow card: 17th minute - Mohannad Abu Taha - v Argentina, 27 June 2026
- Fastest yellow card by a opponent: 44th minute - Ramiz Zerrouki - v Algeria, 22 June 2026
- Latest yellow card: 90+4th minute - Mohammad Abu Zrayq - v Argentina, 27 June 2026
- Latest yellow card by a opponent: 77th minute - Marcel Sabitzer - v Austria, 16 June 2026
- Most shots in a match: 11 - v Austria, 16 June 2026
- Most shots in one half: 8 - v Austria, 16 June 2026 (1st half)
- Fewest shots in a match: 5 - v Argentina, 27 June 2026
- Fewest shots in one half: 2 - (2 times)
  - v Algeria, 22 June 2026 (2nd half)
  - v Argentina, 27 June 2026 (2nd half)
- Longest shotless streak: 53 minutes - 22 June 2026 to 27 June 2026
- Longest shotless streak by a opponent: 29 minutes - v Austria, 16 June 2026
- Most shots on target in a match: 4 - (2 times)
  - v Austria, 16 June 2026
  - v Algeria, 22 June 2026
- Fewest shots on target in a match: 1 - v Argentina, 27 June 2026
- Most shots allowed in a match: 17 - v Algeria, 22 June 2026
- Most shots allowed in one half: 12 - v Algeria, 22 June 2026 (2nd half)
- Fewest shots allowed in a match: 11 - v Austria, 16 June 2026
- Fewest shots allowed in one half: 4 - v Algeria, 22 June 2026 (1st half)
- Most shots on target allowed in a match: 8 - v Algeria, 22 June 2026
- Most shots on target allowed in one half: 6 - v Algeria, 22 June 2026 (2nd half)
- Fewest shots on target allowed in a match: 4 - (2 times)
  - v Austria, 16 June 2026
  - v Argentina, 27 June 2026
- Most shots by both teams in a match: 25 - 8 for Jordan v 17 for Algeria, 22 June 2026
- Most shots by both teams in one half: 15 - 2 for Jordan v 13 for Algeria, 22 June 2026 (2nd half)
- Fewest shots by both teams in a match: 18 - 5 for Jordan v 13 for Argentina, 27 June 2026
- Fewest shots by both teams in one half: 7 - 2 for Jordan v 5 for Austria, 16 June 2026 (2nd half)
- Most shots on target by both teams in a match: 12 - 4 for Jordan v 8 for Algeria, 22 June 2026
- Most shots on target by both teams in one half: 7 - 1 for Jordan v 6 for Algeria, 22 June 2026 (2nd half)
- Fewest shots on target by both teams in a match: 5 - 1 for Jordan v 4 for Argentina, 27 June 2026
- Fewest shots on target by both teams in one half: 2 - 1 for Jordan v 1 for Argentina, 27 June 2026 (2nd half)
- Most offside in a match: 1 - (3 times)
  - v Austria, 16 June 2026
  - v Algeria, 22 June 2026
  - v Argentina, 27 June 2026
- Most offside by a opponent in a match: 3 - (2 times)
  - v Austria, 16 June 2026
  - v Argentina, 27 June 2026
- Most offside by both teams in a match: 4 - (2 times)
  - 1 for Jordan v 3 for Austria, 16 June 2026
  - 1 for Jordan v 3 for Argentina, 27 June 2026

== See also ==
- Asian nations at the FIFA World Cup
- Jordan at the AFC Asian Cup
