= Nizar Al-Rashdan =

Jordanian footballer (born 1999)

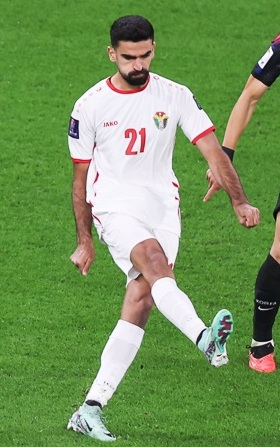
- Al-Rashdan with Jordan at the 2023 AFC Asian Cup.

Personal information
- Birth name: Nizar Mahmoud Ahmed Al-Rashdan
- Date of birth: March 23, 1999 (age 27)
- Place of birth: Irbid, Jordan
- Height: 1.83 m (6 ft 0 in)
- Position: Defensive midfielder

Team information
- Current team: Wydad AC

Senior career*
Years	Team	Apps	(Gls)
2019–2021	Al-Hussein		
2021–2024	Al-Faisaly		
2023	→ Newroz (loan)		
2024	→ Emirates (loan)	13	(1)
2024–2025	Al-Khaldiya		
2025–2026	Al-Zawraa	6	(1)
2026	Qatar SC	11	(0)
2026–	Wydad AC	0	(0)

International career^{‡}
2021–	Jordan	50	(5)
Medal record
Representing Jordan
Men's football
AFC Asian Cup
Runner-up	2023 Qatar	Team
FIFA Arab Cup
Runner-up	2025 Qatar	Team
- * Club domestic league appearances and goals as of 06:15, 10 January 2024 (UTC) ‡ National team caps and goals as of 27 June 2026

Nizar Mahmoud Ahmed Al-Rashdan (Arabic: نزار الرشدان; born 23 March 1999) is a Jordanian professional footballer who plays as a defensive midfielder for Botola Pro club Wydad AC and the Jordan national team.

== Club career ==
Al-Rashdan began his senior career with Al-Hussein in the Jordanian Pro League in 2019. On 4 January 2021, he transferred to Al-Faisaly on a 2-year contract. He extended his contract for 2 more season on 11 January 2014 after helping the club win the 2022 Jordanian Pro League, 2021 Jordan FA Cup, and the 2022 Jordan Shield Cup. On 14 January 2023 he went on a half-season loan to the Iraq Stars League club Newroz. On 31 July 2024, Nizar signed with Bahraini Premier League side Al-Khaldiya on a permanent transfer, around US$200 thousand. On 28 July 2025, Al-Rashdan returned to Iraq to join Al-Zawraa for one season, with an option for an additional season. On 8 January 2026, Qatar announced the signing of Al-Rashdan for half a season.

== International career ==
Al-Rashdan was first called up to the senior Jordan national team in a friendly 2–0 win over Haiti on 4 September 2021. He was called up to the national team for the 2023 AFC Asian Cup. On 29 January 2024, he scored the winning goal in a 3–2 victory over Iraq, which qualified his country to the Asian tournament's quarter-final.

=== International goals ===
At the 2026 FIFA World Cup, Nizar Al-Rashdan scored for Jordan against Algeria, putting his side ahead during the group-stage encounter. Despite the early advantage, Jordan were unable to hold on, as Algeria rallied to win the match 2–1.

No	Date	Venue	Opponent	Score	Result	Competition
1.	12 September 2023	Dalga Arena, Baku, Azerbaijan	Azerbaijan	1–1	1–2	Friendly
2.	29 January 2024	Khalifa International Stadium, Al Rayyan, Qatar	Iraq	3–2	3–2	2023 AFC Asian Cup
3.	14 October 2025	Arena Kombëtare, Tirana, Albania	Albania	1–0	2–4	Friendly
4.	15 December 2025	Al Bayt Stadium, Al Khor, Qatar	Saudi Arabia	1–0	1–0	2025 FIFA Arab Cup
5.	22 June 2026	Levi's Stadium, Santa Clara, United States	Algeria	1–0	1–2	2026 FIFA World Cup

== Personal life ==
On 24 November 2022, Al-Rashdan was married in a wedding ceremony in his hometown Irbid attended by thousands of guests. On 5 January 2024, he welcomed his firstborn child.

== Honours ==
Al-Faisaly

- Jordanian Pro League: 2022
- Jordan FA Cup: 2021
- Jordan Shield Cup: 2022, 2024

Al-Khaldiya

- Bahraini King's Cup: 2024–25
- Khalid Bin Hamad Cup: 2024–25
