= 2023–24 Bahraini FA Cup =

Tournament details
- Country: Bahrain
- Dates: 14 October 2023 – 23 March 2024
- Teams: 24

Final positions
- Champions: Manama (2nd title)
- Runners-up: Al-Shabab

Tournament statistics
- Matches played: 63
- Goals scored: 199 (3.16 per match)

The 2023–24 Bahraini FA Cup was the 17th season of the Bahraini FA Cup, the national football federation cup of Bahrain. Manama defeated Al-Shabab 1–0 in the final to win their second consecutive title, and second in total.

== Group stage ==
=== Group 1 ===
| Pos | Team | Pld | W | D | L | GF | GA | GD | Pts | Qualification or relegation |
|---|---|---|---|---|---|---|---|---|---|---|
| 1 | Al-Shabab (1) | 5 | 4 | 1 | 0 | 14 | 5 | +9 | 13 | Advance to semi-finals |
| 2 | Al-Khaldiya (1) | 5 | 3 | 2 | 0 | 20 | 4 | +16 | 11 | |
| 3 | East Riffa (1) | 5 | 2 | 0 | 3 | 5 | 10 | −5 | 6 | |
| 4 | Umm Al-Hassam (2) | 4 | 2 | 0 | 2 | 4 | 14 | −10 | 6 | |
| 5 | Al-Tadamun (2) | 5 | 1 | 0 | 4 | 4 | 10 | −6 | 3 | |
| 6 | Al-Ittifaq Maqaba (2) | 4 | 0 | 1 | 3 | 5 | 9 | −4 | 1 | |

Source: Soccerway
Rules for classification: Points, Goal difference, Goals scored, Head-to-head points, Head-to-head goal difference, Head-to-head goals scored

Results

| Matchday | Home team | Score | Away team | Report |
14 October 2023
| 1 | Al-Tadamun | 0–2 | Umm Al-Hassam | |
15 October 2023
| 1 | East Riffa | 2–0 | Al-Ittifaq Maqaba | |
16 October 2023
| 1 | Al-Khaldiya | 2–2 | Al-Shabab | |
17 November 2023
| 2 | Al-Shabab | 4–1 | East Riffa | |
18 November 2023
| 2 | Al-Khaldiya | 10–0 | Umm Al-Hassam | |
| 2 | Al-Ittifaq Maqaba | 2–3 | Al-Tadamun | |
14 January 2024
| 3 | Umm Al-Hassam | 0–3 | Al-Shabab | |
| 3 | Al-Tadamun | 0–1 | East Riffa | |
| 3 | Al-Ittifaq Maqaba | 2–2 | Al-Khaldiya | |
17 January 2024
| 4 | East Riffa | 0–4 | Al-Khaldiya | |
| 4 | Al-Shabab | 3–1 | Al-Tadamun | |
18 January 2024
| 4 | Al-Ittifaq Maqaba | Cancelled | Umm Al-Hassam | |
23 January 2024
| 5 | Al-Shabab | 2–1 | Al-Ittifaq Maqaba | |
24 January 2024
| 5 | Umm Al-Hassam | 2–1 | East Riffa | |
25 January 2024
| 5 | Al-Tadamun | 0–2 | Al-Khaldiya | |

=== Group 2 ===
| Pos | Team | Pld | W | D | L | GF | GA | GD | Pts | Qualification or relegation |
|---|---|---|---|---|---|---|---|---|---|---|
| 1 | Manama (1) | 5 | 4 | 1 | 0 | 15 | 3 | +12 | 13 | Advance to semi-finals |
| 2 | Al-Hidd (1) | 5 | 3 | 1 | 1 | 8 | 1 | +7 | 10 | |
| 3 | Buri (2) | 5 | 2 | 1 | 2 | 6 | 9 | −3 | 7 | |
| 4 | A'Ali (2) | 5 | 2 | 0 | 3 | 8 | 9 | −1 | 6 | |
| 5 | Al-Hala (1) | 5 | 2 | 0 | 3 | 4 | 7 | −3 | 6 | |
| 6 | Etehad Al-Reef (2) | 5 | 0 | 1 | 4 | 1 | 13 | −12 | 1 | |

Source: Soccerway
Rules for classification: Points, Goal difference, Goals scored, Head-to-head points, Head-to-head goal difference, Head-to-head goals scored

Results

| Matchday | Home team | Score | Away team | Report |
14 October 2023
| 1 | Al-Hala | 2–0 | A'Ali | |
| 1 | Manama | 0–0 | Al-Hidd | |
15 October 2023
| 1 | Etehad Al-Reef | 1–1 | Buri | |
17 November 2023
| 2 | A'Ali | 2–0 | Etehad Al-Reef | |
| 2 | Al-Hidd | 2–0 | Al-Hala | |
18 November 2023
| 2 | Manama | 3–1 | Buri | |
14 January 2024
| 3 | Etehad Al-Reef | 0–1 | Al-Hala | |
| 3 | Buri | 1–0 | Al-Hidd | |
| 3 | A'Ali | 2–4 | Manama | |
17 January 2024
| 4 | Al-Hidd | 4–0 | Etehad Al-Reef | |
18 January 2024
| 4 | Al-Hala | 0–3 | Manama | |
| 4 | A'Ali | 4–1 | Buri | |
23 January 2024
| 5 | Al-Hidd | 2–0 | A'Ali | |
24 January 2024
| 5 | Etehad Al-Reef | 0–5 | Manama | |
| 5 | Buri | 2–1 | Al-Hala | |

=== Group 3 ===
| Pos | Team | Pld | W | D | L | GF | GA | GD | Pts | Qualification or relegation |
|---|---|---|---|---|---|---|---|---|---|---|
| 1 | Al-Riffa (1) | 5 | 3 | 2 | 0 | 16 | 6 | +10 | 11 | Advance to semi-finals |
| 2 | Malkiya (2) | 5 | 3 | 1 | 1 | 10 | 4 | +6 | 10 | |
| 3 | Budaiya (2) | 5 | 3 | 1 | 1 | 9 | 9 | 0 | 10 | |
| 4 | Al-Najma (1) | 5 | 3 | 0 | 2 | 10 | 10 | 0 | 9 | |
| 5 | Sitra (1) | 4 | 0 | 0 | 4 | 3 | 10 | −7 | 0 | |
| 6 | Al-Ittihad (2) | 4 | 0 | 0 | 4 | 2 | 11 | −9 | 0 | |

Source: Soccerway
Rules for classification: Points, Goal difference, Goals scored, Head-to-head points, Head-to-head goal difference, Head-to-head goals scored

Results

| Matchday | Home team | Score | Away team | Report |
14 October 2023
| 1 | Al-Ittihad | 0–2 | Malkiya | |
| 1 | Budaiya | 1–0 | Al-Najma | |
15 October 2023
| 1 | Al-Riffa | 2–1 | Sitra | |
18 November 2023
| 2 | Al-Najma | 4–0 | Al-Ittihad | |
| 2 | Sitra | 1–3 | Budaiya | |
| 2 | Al-Riffa | 2–2 | Malkiya | |
13 January 2024
| 3 | Al-Ittihad | 1–3 | Budaiya | |
| 3 | Malkiya | 1–0 | Sitra | |
14 January 2024
| 3 | Al-Najma | 0–8 | Al-Riffa | |
17 January 2024
| 4 | Al-Najma | 2–0 | Malkiya | |
18 January 2024
| 4 | Budaiya | 2–2 | Al-Riffa | |
| 4 | Sitra | Cancelled | Al-Ittihad | |
24 January 2024
| 5 | Malkiya | 5–0 | Budaiya | |
| 5 | Sitra | 1–4 | Al-Najma | |
| 5 | Al-Ittihad | 1–2 | Al-Riffa | |

=== Group 4 ===
| Pos | Team | Pld | W | D | L | GF | GA | GD | Pts | Qualification or relegation |
|---|---|---|---|---|---|---|---|---|---|---|
| 1 | Al-Muharraq (1) | 5 | 5 | 0 | 0 | 17 | 3 | +14 | 15 | Advance to semi-finals |
| 2 | Busaiteen (1) | 5 | 3 | 1 | 1 | 10 | 5 | +5 | 10 | |
| 3 | Al-Ahli (1) | 5 | 2 | 0 | 3 | 10 | 10 | 0 | 6 | |
| 4 | Isa Town (2) | 5 | 1 | 1 | 3 | 4 | 8 | −4 | 4 | |
| 5 | Bahrain SC (2) | 4 | 1 | 0 | 3 | 5 | 6 | −1 | 3 | |
| 6 | Qalali (2) | 4 | 1 | 0 | 3 | 4 | 18 | −14 | 3 | |

Source: Soccerway
Rules for classification: Points, Goal difference, Goals scored, Head-to-head points, Head-to-head goal difference, Head-to-head goals scored

Results

| Matchday | Home team | Score | Away team | Report |
14 October 2023
| 1 | Bahrain SC | 1–3 | Busaiteen | |
15 October 2023
| 1 | Isa Town | 1–2 | Qalali | |
17 November 2023
| 2 | Busaiteen | 1–1 | Isa Town | |
| 2 | Al-Ahli | 1–0 | Bahrain SC | |
18 November 2023
| 2 | Al-Muharraq | 8–0 | Qalali | |
9 January 2024
| 1 | Al-Muharraq | 3–1 | Al-Ahli | |
13 January 2024
| 3 | Busaiteen | 1–3 | Al-Muharraq | |
| 3 | Qalali | 2–7 | Al-Ahli | |
| 3 | Isa Town | 0–3 | Bahrain SC | |
17 January 2024
| 4 | Busaiteen | 2–0 | Qalali | |
| 4 | Bahrain SC | 1–2 | Al-Muharraq | |
18 January 2024
| 4 | Al-Ahli | 1–2 | Isa Town | |
23 January 2024
| 5 | Qalali | Cancelled | Bahrain SC | |
| 5 | Isa Town | 0–1 | Al-Muharraq | |
25 January 2024
| 5 | Al-Ahli | 0–3 | Busaiteen | |

== Semi-finals ==
The four group winners participated in the semi-finals.

| Team 1 | Score | Team 2 |
|---|---|---|
| Al-Shabab (1) | 2–1 | Al-Muharraq (1) |
| Manama (1) | 1–0 | Al-Riffa (1) |

== Final ==
The final took place on 23 March 2023.

23 March 2023
21:45

| Al-Shabab | 0–1 | Manama |
|---|---|---|
| | Report | 36' |
