= Ali Ashoor =

Bahraini football manager (born 1981)

Personal information
- Full name: Ali Abdulhameed Abdulla Ashoor
- Date of birth: 4 October 1981 (age 45)
- Place of birth: Bahrain

Senior career*
Years	Team	Apps	(Gls)
2002–2010	Manama Club		
2007–2009	→ Sitra (loan)		

Managerial career
- 2014–2015: Budaiya
- 2015–2018: Al-Najma
- 2018–2022: Al-Riffa
- 2023: Kuwait SC
- 2023–2024: Manama Club
- 2024–2025: Al-Khaldiya
- 2026-: Al-Salmiya
- * Club domestic league appearances and goals

Ali Abdulhameed Abdulla Ashoor (Arabic: عَلِيّ عَبْد الْحَمِيد عَبْد الله عَاشُور; born 04 October 1981) is a Bahraini football manager and former player who manages Al-Salmiya. Ashoor managed several teams in Bahrain and Kuwait.

== Career ==
Ashoor has been regarded as one of the most high-profile Bahraini managers. In 2018, he was appointed manager of Bahraini side Al-Riffa SC. He helped the club win the league. In 2024, he was appointed manager of Bahraini side Al-Khaldiya SC. He was described as "succeeded in improving the level and performance of Al-Khaldiya" while managing the club. He helped the club win the league.

== Honours ==
Al-Najma

- Bahraini King's Cup (1): 2017-18

Al-Riffa

- Bahraini Premier League (3): 2018-19, 2020-21, 2021-22
- Bahraini King's Cup (2): 2018-19, 2020–21
- Bahraini Super Cup (2): 2019, 2021

Al-Khaldiya

- Bahraini Premier League (1): 2023–24
- Bahraini King's Cup (1): 2024–25
- Khalid Bin Hamad Cup (1): 2024-25
- Bahraini Super Cup (3) 2023–24, 2024–25, 2025-26
