= 2025–26 Khalid Bin Hamad Cup =

2024–25 Khalid Bin Hamad Cup
Tournament details
- Country: Bahrain
- Dates: 19 January 2026 – 13 February 2026
- Teams: 4

Final positions
- Champions: Al-Riffa (1st title)

The 2025–26 Khalid Bin Hamad Cup is the 2nd edition of the Khalid Bin Hamad Cup.

== Semi-Final ==
19 January 2026	Al-Khaldiya	0-2 (a.e.t)	Al-Riffa	Riffa, Bahrain
			Samuel Toscas 102'; Hashim Sayed Isa 110'	Stadium: Bahrain National Stadium

20 January 2026	Al-Muharraq	5-3	Sitra Club	Riffa, Bahrain
	Mahrouq 9'; Juninho 37' 55' 67'; Tobares 90+5'		Jota 27' (pen.) 82' (pen.)	Stadium: Bahrain National Stadium

== Final ==
13 February 2026
18:30

Al-Riffa	1-1 (8-7) (a.e.t.)	Al-Muharraq

Bahrain National Stadium, Riffa, Bahrain
