= Ahmed Merza =

Bahraini footballer

Personal information
- Full name: Ahmed Merza Musa Ahmed
- Date of birth: 24 February 1991 (age 35)
- Place of birth: Manama, Bahrain
- Height: 1.81 m (5 ft 11 in)
- Position: Midfielder

Team information
- Current team: Al-Khaldiya SC
- Number: 89

Senior career*
Years	Team	Apps	(Gls)
2008–2014	Al-Ettihad		
2014–2017	Al-Riffa		
2017–2018	Al-Ettihad		
2018–2022	Al-Hidd		
2022–2023	Manama Club		
2024–	Al-Khaldiya SC		

International career^{‡}
2013–	Bahrain	11	(0)
- * Club domestic league appearances and goals as of 02:05, 6 January 2019 (UTC) ‡ National team caps and goals as of 02:05, 6 January 2019 (UTC)

Ahmed Merza Musa Ahmed (Arabic: أحمد ميرزا; born 21 February 1991) is a Bahraini footballer who plays as a midfielder for Al-Khaldiya SC and the Bahrain national team.

== Career ==
Merza was included in Bahrain's squad for the 2019 AFC Asian Cup in the United Arab Emirates.

== Career statistics ==
=== International ===
As of 20 December 2018

Bahrain
Year	Apps	Goals
2013	2	0
2014	1	0
2016	3	0
2018	1	0
Total	7	0
