= Nermin Šabić =

Bosnian football manager (born 1973)

Personal information
- Date of birth: 21 December 1973 (age 52)
- Place of birth: Zenica, SFR Yugoslavia
- Height: 1.69 m (5 ft 7 in)
- Position: Central midfielder

Youth career
- –1989: Čelik Zenica

Senior career*
Years	Team	Apps	(Gls)
1989–1992	Čelik Zenica	43	(8)
1992	Red Star Belgrade	0	(0)
1993	Dubrava	12	(1)
1994	Zagreb	6	(0)
1994–1995	Inter Zaprešić	44	(7)
1996–1997	Osijek	29	(0)
1997	Zadar	23	(6)
1998–2000	Dinamo Zagreb	59	(13)
2001	Željezničar	7	(0)
2001–2002	Zagreb	15	(0)
2002–2003	Čelik Zenica	23	(3)
2003–2005	Changchun Yatai	46	(3)
2006–2010	Čelik Zenica	85	(13)
Total		382	(54)

International career
1994–1995	Croatia U21	6	(0)
1996–2008	Bosnia and Herzegovina	36	(1)

Managerial career
- 2017–2018: Zvijezda Gradačac
- 2018: Mladost Doboj Kakanj
- 2019: Shanxi Metropolis
- 2019: TOŠK Tešanj
- 2019–2022: Bosnia and Herzegovina U17
- * Club domestic league appearances and goals

Nermin Šabić (born 21 December 1973) is a Bosnian professional football manager and former player.

== Club career ==
Born in Zenica, SR Bosnia and Herzegovina, back then part of SFR Yugoslavia, Šabić started playing with hometown club Čelik Zenica having played with them in the 1990–91 Yugoslav First League season. Afterwards, he moved to Red Star Belgrade but with the start of the Yugoslav Wars he left the club along with Goran Jurić and Robert Prosinečki.

Šabić then moved to Croatia where he played for almost a decade in the Croatian First League, first with Dubrava, Zagreb, Inter Zaprešić, Osijek and Zadar, and then with Dinamo Zagreb, know back then as Croatia Zagreb, between 1997 and 2001, winning with them 3 championships (the last 3 of the 5 in-a-row Zagreb won) and two cups. He spent the second half of the 2000–01 season in Bosnia playing with Željezničar and had also won the double with them.

Šabić then returned to Croatia and was part of the championship winning squad of Zagreb in the season 2001–02. Afterwards, he played 3 seasons in China with Changchun Yatai, before returning to Bosnia to his former club Čelik where he finished his career in 2010.

== International career ==
From 1994 to 1995, Šabić represented the Croatia national U21 team, making 6 appearances.

He then made his senior debut for Bosnia and Herzegovina in an April 1996 friendly match against Albania and has earned a total of 38 caps (2 unofficial), scoring 1 goal. His final international was an August 2008 friendly match against Bulgaria.

== Managerial career ==
After retiring, Šabić held the position of CEO of Čelik Zenica in 2011, and in June 2015 he became assistant manager of Ibrahim Rahimić, at Bosnian Premier League newly promoted side Mladost Doboj Kakanj, where he also accumulated the function of main coordinator of the youth teams in the club.

On 13 June 2017, Šabić became the new manager of First League of FBiH club Zvijezda Gradačac. On 10 April 2018, he left Zvijezda to become the manager of Mladost Doboj Kakanj. He officially took over the club the next day on 11 April. After a terrible start to the league which culminated even more with a 93rd minute 0–1 home league loss against Široki Brijeg on 15 August 2018, he left the club the next day.

For a short period from January to February 2019, Šabić was in charge of China League Two club Shanxi Metropolis. On 8 September 2019, he became the new manager of First League of FBiH club TOŠK Tešanj. In his first game as TOŠK manager, his team beat Metalleghe-BSI 2–1 at home in a league match. Šabić left TOŠK on 23 December 2019, taking over the position of head coach of the Bosnia and Herzegovina U17 national team two days earlier, on 21 December. He officially took over the position four days later, on 27 December, signing a contract with the Bosnian FA.

On 16 January 2024, Šabić was appointed assistant manager of Željezničar, with newly appointed Bruno Akrapović as manager. He left the club following Akrapović's departure in April 2024.

== Career statistics ==
=== International goals ===
Scores and results table. Bosnia and Herzegovina's goal tally first:

Goal	Date	Venue	Opponent	Score	Result	Competition
1.	7 October 2001	Koševo City Stadium, Sarajevo, Bosnia and Herzegovina	Liechtenstein	3–0	5–0	2002 FIFA World Cup qualification

== Managerial statistics ==
As of match played 20 August 2022

Managerial record by team and tenure
Team	From	To	Record							
Team	From	To	G	W	D	L	GF	GA	GD	Win %
Zvijezda Gradačac	13 June 2017	9 April 2018	21	12	6	3	27	8	+19	57.14
Mladost Doboj Kakanj	11 April 2018	15 August 2018	11	2	2	7	11	22	−11	18.18
Shanxi Metropolis	1 January 2019	25 February 2019	0	0	0	0	0	0	+0	—
TOŠK Tešanj	8 September 2019	23 December 2019	12	7	1	4	29	17	+12	58.33
Bosnia and Herzegovina U17	27 December 2019	28 August 2022	29	9	8	12	37	43	−6	31.03
Total			73	30	17	26	104	90	+14	41.10

== Honours ==
=== Player ===
Dinamo Zagreb

- Croatian First League: 1997–98, 1998–99, 1999–00
- Croatian Cup: 1997–98, 2000–01

Željezničar

- Bosnian Premier League: 2000–01
- Bosnian Cup: 2000–01

Zagreb

- Croatian First League: 2001–02
