= Kuwaiti El Clásico =

Kuwait football rivalry

Leqa' Al-Ghareemayn
- Other names: Al-derbi Al-Kuwaity , Clasico Al-Kora Al-Kuwaitia
- Location: Capital / Hawally (Kuwait)
- Teams: Al-Arabi & Qadsia
- First meeting: 17 November 1961
- Latest meeting: Al-Arabi 3–0 Qadsia (2026–27 Kuwaiti Premier League) (1 November 2026)

Statistics
- Most wins: Qadsia (88)
- Most player appearances: Bader Al-Mutawa (63)

Leqa' Al-Ghareemayn (Arabic: لقاء الغريمين), also known as Al-derbi Al-Kuwaity, or Clasico Al-Kora Al-Kuwaitia (Arabic language) is the nickname of a football match (derby) between the rivals Al-Arabi and Qadsia. The rivalry comes about as Hawally and Capital are the two cities in Kuwait, and the two clubs are the most successful and influential football clubs in the country.

== Statistics ==
=== Total head to head results ===
The following table lists the history, of meetings between Qadsia and Al-Arabi, updated to the most recent classico of 1 November 2026 (Al-Arabi–Qadsia 3-0)

| | Matches | Qadsia wins | Draws | Al-Arabi wins | Qadsia goals | Al-Arabi goals |
| Premier League | 140 | 47 | 46 | 47 | 167 | 178 |
| Emir Cup | 29 | 16 | 2 | 11 | 41 | 39 |
| Crown Prince Cup | 23 | 11 | 1 | 11 | 25 | 23 |
| Super Cup | 3 | 2 | 0 | 1 | 6 | 5 |
| All competitions | 195 | 76 | 49 | 70 | 239 | 245 |
| Federation Cup | 14 | 6 | 3 | 5 | 16 | 17 |
| Al Kurafi Cup | 7 | 3 | 1 | 3 | 7 | 11 |
| Joint League | 7 | 3 | 1 | 3 | 8 | 8 |
| All Defunct competitions | 28 | 12 | 5 | 11 | 31 | 36 |
| The Total | 223 | 88 | 54 | 81 | 270 | 281 |

=== All-time top scorers ===
As of 13 June 2026

| Rank | Nationality | Player | Years | Club | Total |
|---|---|---|---|---|---|
| 1 | Kuwait | Bader Al-Mutawa | 2002– | Qadsia | 25 |
| 2 | Kuwait | Abdulrahman Al-Dawla | 1961–1975 | Al-Arabi | 14 |
| 2 | Kuwait | Jasem Yaqoub | 1970–1983 | Qadsia | 14 |
| 2 | Syria | Firas Al-Khatib | 2003–2009; 2009–2012; 2014–2016 | Al-Arabi; Qadsia | 14 |
| 5 | Kuwait | Khaled Khalaf | 2001–2016 | Al-Arabi | 7 |
| 6 | Kuwait | Mohammad Jarragh | 1998–2016 | Al-Arabi | 5 |
| 7 | Syria | Omar Al Soma | 2011–2014 | Qadsia | 4 |
| 7 | Kuwait | Ali Maqseed | 2005–2020 | Al-Arabi | 4 |

=== Records ===
- Record victory – Al-Arabi 7–1 Qadsia (10 January 1962)
- Record goals in match – 8
  - Al-Arabi 7–1 Qadsia (10 January 1962)
  - Qadsia 5–3 Al-Arabi (February 1975)

== Personnel at both clubs ==
=== Players ===
Qadsia then Al-Arabi

- 1997: (Kuwait) Faisal Bourgba
- 2002: (Kuwait) Mishari Jassim
- 2016: (Democratic Republic of the Congo) Doris Fuakumputu
- 2016: (Kuwait) Hamad Al-Enezi
- 2017: (Kuwait) Mohammad Rashed
- 2017: (Ivory Coast) Brahima Keita
- 2019: (Kuwait) Hamad Aman
- 2020: (Kuwait) Mohammad Znefer
- 2021: (Palestine) Oday Dabbagh
- 2021: (Kuwait) Sultan Al Enezi
- 2021: (Kuwait) Saif Al Hashan

Al-Arabi then Qadsia

- 1964: (Kuwait) Abdullah Al Asfour
- 1996: (Kuwait) Nawaf Bkheet
- 2010: (Syria) Firas Al-Khatib
- 2018: (Kuwait) Khaled Al-Rashidi
- 2022: (Ivory Coast) Bernard Doumbia
- 2022: (Kuwait) Ali Jarrakh
- 2022: (Kuwait) Abdullah Al Shemali
- 2023: (Libya) Mohammed Soulah
- 2023: (Jordan) Mahmoud Al-Mardi
- 2025: (Saudi Arabia) Abdulrahman Al-Dhafeeri

=== Managers ===
- (Serbia) Dragan Gugleta
  - Qadsia: 1993–1995
  - Al-Arabi: 1999–2000
- (Kuwait) Mohammed Ebrahim
  - Qadsia: 1999–2000, 2002–2004, 2005–2007, 2008–2011, 2012–2014, 2023–2024, 2026–
  - Al-Arabi: 2017–2018
- (Kuwait) Nasser Al-Shatti
  - Qadsia: 2022
  - Al-Arabi: 2016–2017 2024–2025

== See also ==
- Major football rivalries
