= Marco Alves =

Portuguese football manager

Personal information
- Full name: Marco César Pereira da Cunha Alves
- Date of birth: 4 November 1975 (age 50)
- Place of birth: Guimarães, Portugal
- Height: 1.76 m (5 ft 9 in)
- Position: Defender

Team information
- Current team: F.C. Famalicão U-23 (head coach)

Youth career
- Peña Deportiva

Senior career*
Years	Team	Apps	(Gls)
1993–1994	Peña Deportiva		
1994–1995	Salgueiros		
1995–1996	União de Lamas		
1996–1997	Felgueiras		
1997–1998	Leça		
1998–1999	C.D. Feirense		
1999–2000	Naval		
2000–2001	Trofense		
2001–2002	Espinho		
2002–2003	Dragões Sandinenses		
2003–2005	AD Fafe		
2005–2006	S.C.U. Torreense		

Managerial career
- 2006–2011: G.D. Serzedelo
- 2011-2012: Sharjah (Assistant manager)
- 2012–2013: G.D. Serzedelo
- 2013–2014: Taipas
- 2014–2015: G.D. Joane
- 2015: Trofense (Assistant manager)
- 2015–2018: Vitória S.C. B (Assistant manager)
- 2019: Moreireense (Assistant manager)
- 2019–2021: Al Taawoun (Assistant manager)
- 2021–2023: G.D. Chaves (Assistant manager)
- 2023–2024: Gil Vicente (Assistant manager)
- 2024–2025: G.D. Chaves
- 2025: Al-Arabi
- 2026-: F.C. Famalicão U-23
- * Club domestic league appearances and goals

Marco Alves (born 14 July 1986) is a retired professional footballer who played as a Defender. He is currently the head coach of F.C. Famalicão U-23.

== Managerial career ==
Marco Alves spent many years working behind the scenes as an assistant/adjunct coach in Portuguese football, both at his home club GD Chaves and with Gil Vicente, Moreirense, Vitória de Guimarães, Trofense, as well as some experience abroad with clubs in Saudi Arabia and the UAE. His first major role as head coach in a higher-league environment came in the 2024–25 season, when he took over GD Chaves in Portugal's Segunda Liga. Under his management, Chaves played 37 competitive matches, winning 16, drawing 9 and losing 12.

In July 2017 he joined Al-Arabi with his choice of coaching staff continuing after Nasser Al-Shatti. after 11 games he was sacked by the club.

== Managerial statistics ==
As of match played 13 September 2025

Managerial record by team and tenure
Team	Nat.	From	To	Record							
Team	Nat.	From	To	G	W	D	L	GF	GA	GD	Win %
G.D. Chaves	(Portugal)	1 July 2024	30 June 2025	36	16	9	11	43	35	+8	44.44
Al-Arabi	(Kuwait)	9 July 2025	10 November 2025	11	6	4	1	23	8	+15	54.55
Total				47	22	13	12	66	58	+8	46.81
