= Alnasser (sportswear) =

Kuwaiti sportswear company

Alnasser Alryadi
- Type: Private
- Industry: Textile
- Founded: 1984; 42 years ago
- Headquarters: Kuwait City, Kuwait
- Area served: Kuwait, Bahrain, Saudi Arabia, Iraq, Egypt, Pakistan, Qatar, Australia
- Key people: Faisal Al Rasheed
- Products: Sportswear; Sports equipment
- Revenue: ▲$150m (2024)
- Number of employees: ▲784 (2024)
- Website: alnasser.net

Alnasser is a Kuwaiti manufacturer of sportswear and athletic clothing, headquartered in Kuwait City, Kuwait. It is considered a middle eastern leader in the production of active sportswear.

What started as a sports leisure, fashion and equipment brand, turned into a regional leader in sports, where they started manufacturing top sports teams equipment in early 2023

== History ==
Al Nasser was founded in 1984 in Kuwait by Faisal Al Rasheed and his family as a single sports retail outlet under the Faisal Al Rasheed Group. Initially focused on sporting goods and equipment, the company quickly expanded its product range to include sportswear, casual fashion, footwear, and accessories. Over the following decades, Al Nasser grew into one of Kuwait's largest value-for-money fashion and sports retailers, operating more than 50 stores locally and expanding into other Middle Eastern and Asian markets. Where the brand commemorated its 30th anniversary with a major brand expansions across the region. and since 2007 it hold the biggest sports market in Kuwait.

In the early 2020s the brand began providing equipment and manufacturing sportswear for sports club alongside sponsorships starting with Al-Nasr SC further more signed its first contract with Al-Arabi.

== Sponsorship teams ==
=== Football ===
==== Clubs ====
- (Kuwait) Al-Arabi
- (Kuwait) Al-Nasr
- (Kuwait) Qadsia
- (Saudi Arabia) Al-Khaleej

=== Handball ===
==== Federation ====
- Asian Handball Federation

==== Clubs ====
- (Saudi Arabia) Al-Khaleej

==== National Teams ====
- Kuwait
