= Gabriel Furtado =

Brazilian footballer (born 1999)

Personal information
- Full name: Gabriel Vinicius de Oliveira Furtado
- Date of birth: 9 December 1999 (age 26)
- Place of birth: Taubaté, Brazil
- Height: 1.85 m (6 ft 1 in)
- Position: Centre-back

Team information
- Current team: Anorthosis Famagusta
- Number: 45

Youth career
- São Carlos
- 2014–2016: Paraná

Senior career*
Years	Team	Apps	(Gls)
2016–2018	Paraná	2	(0)
2017–2018	→ Palmeiras (loan)	1	(0)
2018–2022	Palmeiras	0	(0)
2019–2020	→ Getafe B (loan)	10	(0)
2020–2021	→ Vitória (loan)	9	(0)
2021	→ Londrina (loan)	2	(0)
2022	Coimbra	0	(0)
2022	→ Villa Nova (loan)	7	(0)
2022–2023	Sampaio Corrêa	27	(0)
2024	Mesaimeer	11	(1)
2024–2025	Borneo Samarinda	25	(2)
2025–	Anorthosis Famagusta	25	(3)
- * Club domestic league appearances and goals as of 9 May 2026

Gabriel Vinicius de Oliveira Furtado (born 9 December 1999) is a Brazilian professional footballer who plays as a centre-back for Cypriot First Division club Anorthosis Famagusta.

== Club career ==
Born in Taubaté, Furtado started his youth career with the academy of São Carlos, before moving to the academy of Paraná in 2014. On 25 November 2016, he made his senior debut in a 2–0 victory against Tupi, in Série B.

Furtado was loaned out to Série A side Palmeiras on 22 March 2017. On 25 June, he made his first team debut in a 2–1 win against Ponte Preta.

On 14 March 2018, Furtado signed a permanent deal with the club, committing until 2022. On 19 September, he was included in the Palmeiras squad for the season's Copa Libertadores as a replacement for the departing Thiago Martins.

== International career ==
On 13 December 2018, Furtado was included in the under-20 team for the 2019 South American U-20 Championship.

== Career statistics ==
As of match played on 25 June 2017

Club	Season	League			State League		Cup		Continental		Other		Total	
Club	Season	Division	Apps	Goals	Apps	Goals	Apps	Goals	Apps	Goals	Apps	Goals	Apps	Goals
Paraná	2016	Série B	1	0	0	0	0	0	—		—		1	0
Paraná	2017	Série B	0	0	1	0	0	0	—		0	0	1	0
Paraná	Total		1	0	1	0	0	0	—		0	0	2	0
Palmeiras (loan)	2017	Série A	1	0	—		0	0	—		—		1	0
Palmeiras	2018	Série A	0	0	0	0	0	0	0	0	—		0	0
Career total			2	0	1	0	0	0	0	0	0	0	3	0

== Honours ==
Borneo Samarinda

- Piala Presiden runner-up: 2024

== Personal life ==
Furtado's twin brother Rafael is also a professional footballer. A forward, they shared teams at Paraná.
