= Ikhsan Zikrak =

Indonesian footballer

Personal information
- Full name: Ikhsan Nul Zikrak Batubara
- Date of birth: 8 November 2002 (age 24)
- Place of birth: Padang Pariaman, Indonesia
- Height: 1.76 m (5 ft 9 in)
- Positions: Attacking midfielder; right winger

Team information
- Current team: Borneo Samarinda
- Number: 6

Youth career
- 2017–2019: PPLP Sumatera Barat
- 2019: PSP Padang

Senior career*
Years	Team	Apps	(Gls)
2021–2023	RANS Nusantara	27	(3)
2023–	Borneo Samarinda	46	(5)

International career^{‡}
2023–2024	Indonesia U23	5	(0)
- * Club domestic league appearances and goals as of 11 October 2026 ‡ National team caps and goals as of 2 May 2024

Ikhsan Nul Zikrak Batubara (born 8 November 2002) is an Indonesian professional footballer who plays as an attacking midfielder or right winger for Liga 1 club Borneo Samarinda.

== Club career ==
=== RANS Nusantara ===
On 23 April 2021, Zikrak was signed for RANS Nusantara to play in Liga 2 in the 2021–22 season. Zikrak made his first-team debut in a pre-season friendly against Liga 1 club Arema on 6 June 2021, and also scoring for his first team in a 6–2 loss. He made his league debut for RANS Nusantara when he was part of the starting lineup of a 2021 Liga 2 match against Persekat Tegal on 5 October in a 1–2 win. Until the end of the season, he contributed with 9 league appearances, and scored one goal in pre-season friendly match with RANS Nusantara, and also succeeded in bringing his first team to runner-up in Liga 2, and promotion to the highest tier league in Indonesia next season.

On 23 July 2022, Zikrak made his Liga 1 debut for the club in a match against PSIS Semarang, coming on as a substitute for Alfin Tuasalamony in the 79th minute. On 16 December 2022, he played full 90 minutes and scored his league goal of the season for the club in a 2–1 win against Bhayangkara.

On 30 January 2023, he scored the opening goal in a 3–1 loss over PSM Makassar. On 8 February, he scored another opening goal in a 2–1 loss to Arema.

=== Borneo Samarinda ===
Ahead of the 2023–24 season, Zikrak signed a three-year contract with Borneo Samarinda.

== International career ==
In April 2023, Zikrak was called up to the Indonesia U22 for the training centre in preparation for 2023 SEA Games. Zikrak made his international debut on 14 April 2023 in a friendly match against Lebanon U22 at Gelora Bung Karno Stadium, Jakarta.

== Personal life ==
He is the younger brother of Muhammad Iqbal, who also a footballer and a former U-19 national team player in the Indra Sjafri era. Syamsuddin Batubara is his father as well as his first coach to start his career as a footballer. his father is the founder of the Soccer School of Football Association of Kudugantiang in Padang Pariaman.

== Career statistics ==
=== Club ===
As of match played 11 October 2026

Club	Season	League			Cup		Continental		Other (Note: Appearances in Indonesia President's Cup)		Total	
Club	Season	Division	Apps	Goals	Apps	Goals	Apps	Goals	Apps	Goals	Apps	Goals
RANS Nusantara	2021	Liga 2	9	0	0	0	–		0	0	9	0
RANS Nusantara	2022–23	Liga 1	18	3	0	0	–		2	0	20	3
RANS Nusantara	Total		27	3	0	0	0	0	2	0	29	3
Borneo Samarinda	2023–24	Liga 1	9	2	0	0	–		0	0	9	2
Borneo Samarinda	2024–25	Liga 1	14	0	0	0	–		3 (Note: Appearances in ASEAN Club Championship)	0	17	0
Borneo Samarinda	2025–26	Super League	18	2	0	0	–		0	0	18	2
Borneo Samarinda	2026–27	Super League	5	1	0	0	2 (Note: Appearances in AFC Challenge League)	0	1	0	8	1
Career total			73	8	0	0	2	0	6	0	81	8

== Honours ==
RANS Cilegon

- Liga 2 runner-up: 2021

Borneo Samarinda

- Piala Presiden runner-up: 2024
