= Igor Remetić =

Bosnian footballer and manager

Personal information
- Date of birth: 14 September 1976 (age 50)
- Place of birth: Mostar, SFR Yugoslavia
- Height: 1.85 m (6 ft 1 in)
- Position: Centre-forward

Youth career
- 1988–1992: Velež Mostar

Senior career*
Years	Team	Apps	(Gls)
- Radnički Jaša Tomić
1997–1998	Vrbas	5	(0)
1998–2000	AIK Bačka Topola		
2000–2003	Velež Mostar	75	(16)
2004	Östers		
2005–2006	GOŠK Dubrovnik		
2006–2008	Velež Mostar	23	(2)
2008–2010	Čapljina		
2010	Rudar Kakanj		
2011	Velež Mostar	5	(0)

Managerial career
- 2014: Velež Mostar U19
- 2015–2016: Turbina Jablanica
- 2016–2017: TOŠK Tešanj
- 2017: Turbina Jablanica
- 2018: Travnik
- 2018–2019: Velež Mostar (youth coordinator)
- 2019: Velež Mostar (assistant)
- 2019: Velež Mostar U17
- 2019: Neretva
- 2020: TOŠK Tešanj
- 2021: Al Tahaddy
- * Club domestic league appearances and goals

Igor Remetić (born 14 September 1976) is a Bosnian professional football manager and former player.

== Playing career ==
Remetić started his playing career at locl side Velež Mostar, but as the Yugoslav Wars started, he became a refugee in Serbia where he continued his career initially playing with lower-league side FK Radnički Jaša Tomić. Remetić then continued climbing up his career in the Serbian league system, first playing with Vrbas, and then a longer spell between 1998 and 2003 with third-level AIK Bačka Topola.

In the season 2003–04, he moved to Sweden and played with Östers, following a return to the Balkans next season, this time to play with Croatian side GOŠK Dubrovnik between 2004 and 2006. The following season, Remetić returned to Bosnia and Herzegovina and joined Velež Mostar, playing with them in the 2006–07 season. It was then followed by a spell with another Bosnian side, Čapljina between 2008 and 2010. His last season as a player was spent by playing the first part of the 2010–11 season with Rudar Kakanj, before ending his career by playing the rest of the season with Velež Mostar.

== Managerial statistics ==
As of 5 September 2020

Managerial record by team and tenure
Team	From	To	Record							
Team	From	To	G	W	D	L	GF	GA	GD	Win %
Turbina Jablanica	14 August 2015	30 June 2016	30	15	7	8	60	47	+13	50.00
TOŠK Tešanj	1 July 2016	11 September 2017	32	23	3	6	70	24	+46	71.88
Travnik	9 January 2018	18 March 2018	2	0	0	2	1	3	−2	0.00
Velež Mostar U17	1 July 2019	23 October 2019	12	1	4	7	12	25	−13	8.33
TOŠK Tešanj	3 January 2020	6 September 2020	6	2	2	2	7	7	+0	33.33
Total			84	42	16	26	150	106	+44	50.00

== Honours ==
=== Player ===
GOŠK Dubrovnik

- 3. HNL: 2005–06 (South)

Čapljina

- Second League of FBiH: 2009–10 (South)

=== Manager ===
TOŠK Tešanj

- Second League of FBiH: 2016–17 (Center)
