= Salim Obaid =

Jordanian footballer

Saleem Obaid
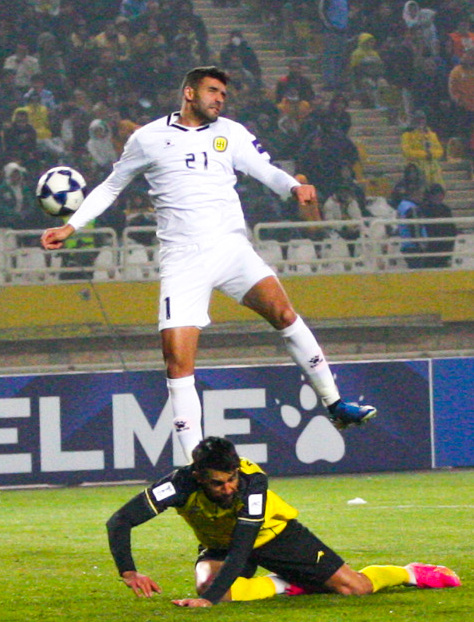
- Obaid with Al-Hussein in 2025

Personal information
- Full name: Saleem Amer Obaid
- Date of birth: 17 January 1992 (age 34)
- Place of birth: Amman, Jordan
- Height: 1.85 m (6 ft 1 in)
- Position: Left back

Team information
- Current team: Al-Hussein
- Number: 21

Youth career
- Al-Ahli

Senior career*
Years	Team	Apps	(Gls)
2011–2018	Al-Ahli		
2018–2021	Al-Wehdat		
2021–2022	Sahab		
2022–2023	Shabab Al-Ordon		
2023–	Al-Hussein		

International career^{‡}
2019–	Jordan	8	(0)
Medal record
Representing Jordan
Men's football
FIFA Arab Cup
Runner-up	2025 Qatar	Team
- * Club domestic league appearances and goals ‡ National team caps and goals as of 9 December 2025

Saleem Amer Obaid (Arabic: سَلِيم عَامِر عُبَيْد; born 17 January 1992) is a Jordanian footballer who plays as a left back for Jordanian Pro League side Al-Hussein and the Jordan national team.

== International ==
He made his debut for the Jordan national football team on 23 March 2019 in a 2019 International Friendship Championship game against Syria, as a starter.
