= Lucas Salinas =

Brazilian footballer (born 1995)

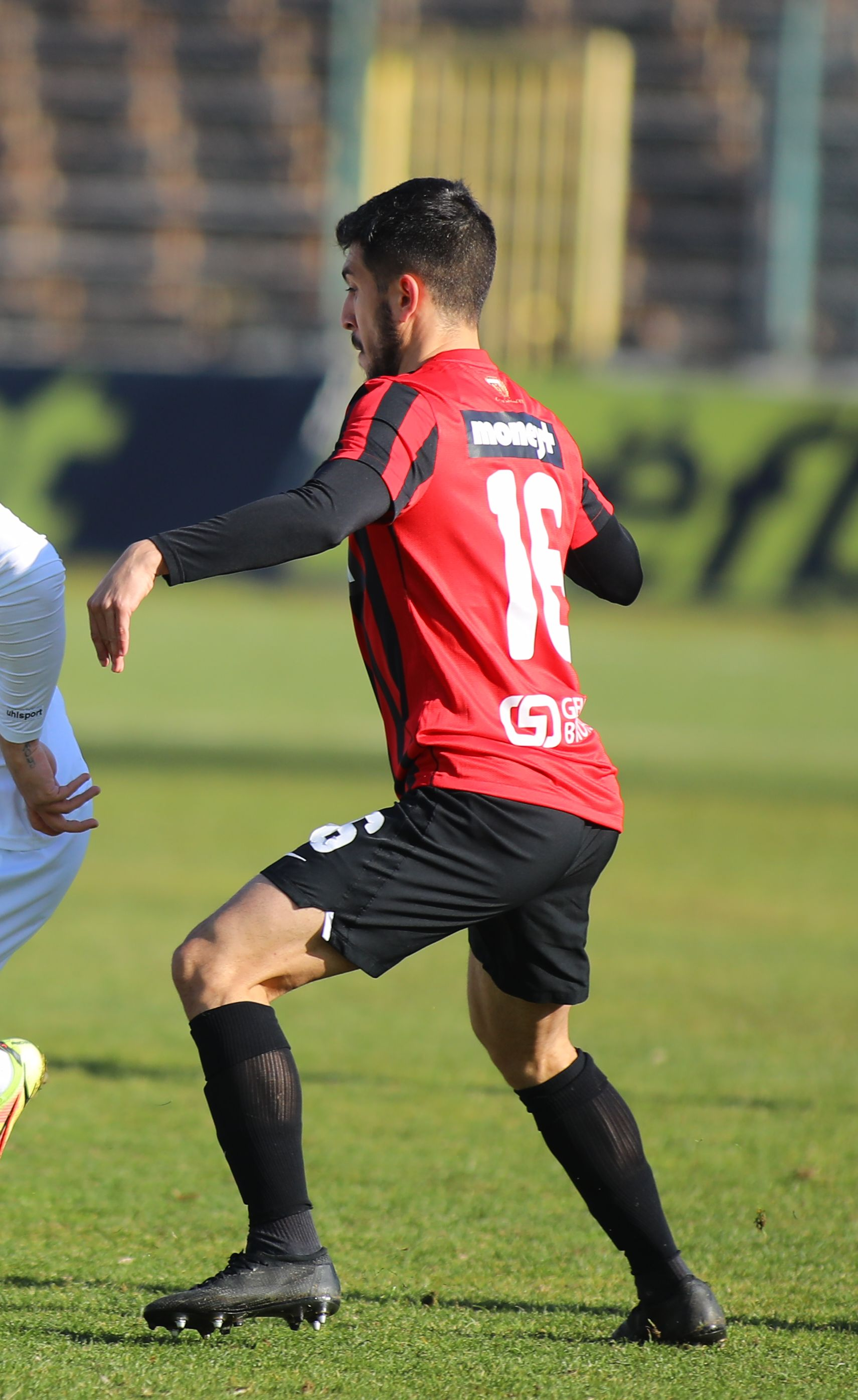
- Salinas with Lokomotiv Plovdiv in 2021

Personal information
- Full name: Lucas Spinola Salinas
- Date of birth: 14 October 1995 (age 31)
- Place of birth: Sorocaba, Brazil
- Height: 1.70 m (5 ft 7 in)
- Position: Attacking midfielder

Youth career
- 2012–2013: São Bento

Senior career*
Years	Team	Apps	(Gls)
2014–2015	São Bento	12	(0)
2016	Atlético Sorocaba	3	(1)
2016–2017	Lusitano VRSA	16	(0)
2017–2018	Armacenenses	16	(1)
2018–2019	Olhanense	14	(0)
2019–2020	Sertanense	28	(5)
2020–2022	Lokomotiv Plovdiv	59	(5)
2022–2023	Ashdod	17	(1)
2024	Al-Khaldiya		
2024–2025	Borneo Samarinda	6	(0)
- * Club domestic league appearances and goals as of 30 September 2024

Lucas Spinola Salinas (born 14 October 1995) is a Brazilian professional footballer who plays as an attacking midfielder.

== Club career ==
Salinas made his professional debut in the Campeonato Paulista for São Bento on 26 March 2015 in a game against Bragantino. In February 2020, he joined Bulgarian club Lokomotiv Plovdiv on a two-and-a-half-year contract.

== Honours ==
Lokomotiv Plovdiv

- Bulgarian Cup: 2019–20
- Bulgarian Supercup: 2020
