= Rizdjar Nurviat =

Indonesian footballer

Personal information
- Full name: Rizdjar Nurviat Subagja
- Date of birth: 2 January 2006 (age 20)
- Place of birth: Cirebon, Indonesia
- Height: 1.82 m (6 ft 0 in)
- Position: Right-back

Team information
- Current team: PSMS Medan
- Number: 26

Youth career
- SSB Igoku Cirebon
- 2016–2017: SSB Bina Sentra
- 2017–2022: Borneo Samarinda
- 2022–2023: Garuda Select

Senior career*
Years	Team	Apps	(Gls)
2023–2026	Borneo Samarinda	5	(0)
2025–2026	→ Dewa United (loan)	11	(0)
2026–	PSMS Medan	1	(0)

International career^{‡}
2022–2023	Indonesia U17	13	(0)
2024	Indonesia U20	6	(0)
- * Club domestic league appearances and goals as of 13 September 2026 (UTC) ‡ National team caps and goals as of 2 February 2025

Rizdjar Nurviat Subagja (born 2 January 2006) is an Indonesian professional footballer who plays as a right-back for Championship club PSMS Medan.

== Early career ==
Born in Cirebon, Rizdjar began his career playing for SSB Igoku Cirebon, then joined Borneo U12 in 2017. After that, Rizdjar joined Bina Sentra Football Academy Cirebon in 2017, and rejoined Borneo U16 in the same year.

He was also part of the Garuda Select team in 2022, where he studied in England and Italy for six months.

== Club career ==
=== Borneo Samarinda ===
Ahead of the 2023–24 season, he joined the Borneo's first team. He made his professional debut on matchday 33 of the 2023–24 season, when Borneo faced Persib Bandung on 25 April 2024 in a 2–1 defeat.

==== Loan to Dewa United ====
On 28 August 2025, Rizdjar joined Dewa United, on a loan deal from Borneo Samarinda. He made his club debut on 13 September 2025, playing as a starter in a 1–2 away win against Arema at Kanjuruhan Stadium.

== International career ==
Rizdjar was part of the Indonesia U16 squad that won the 2022 AFF U-16 Youth Championship. In the tournament, he was a regular starter as a right-back, including playing in the final against Vietnam U16.

In 2023, Rizdjar was called up to the Indonesia U17 for the 2023 FIFA U-17 World Cup hosted in Indonesia. He made appearances in the group stage matches against Ecuador U17 and Panama U17.

== Career statistics ==
=== Club ===
As of 13 September 2026

Club	Season	League			Cup		Continental		Other		Total	
Club	Season	Division	Apps	Goals	Apps	Goals	Apps	Goals	Apps	Goals	Apps	Goals
Borneo Samarinda	2023–24	Liga 1	3	0	0	0	–		0	0	3	0
Borneo Samarinda	2024–25	Liga 1	2	0	0	0	–		0	0	2	0
Borneo Samarinda	Total		5	0	0	0	–		0	0	5	0
Dewa United (loan)	2025–26	Super League	11	0	0	0	2 (Note: Appearances in AFC Challenge League)	0	0	0	13	0
PSMS Medan	2026–27	Championship	1	0	0	0	–		0	0	1	0
Career total			17	0	0	0	2	0	0	0	19	0

== Honours ==
=== International ===
Indonesia U-17

- ASEAN U-16 Boys Championship: 2022

Indonesia U-19

- ASEAN U-19 Boys Championship: 2024
