= 2024–25 Khalid Bin Hamad Cup =

Tournament details
- Country: Bahrain
- Dates: 22 January 2025 – 28 January 2025
- Teams: 4

Final positions
- Champions: Al-Khaldiya (1st title)
- Runners-up: Riffa

Tournament statistics
- Matches played: 3
- Goals scored: 11 (3.67 per match)
- Attendance: 9,248 (3,083 per match)

The 2024-25 Khalid Bin Hamad Cup is the 1st edition of the Khalid Bin Hamad Cup.

== Semi-Final ==
| 22 January 2025 | Al Ahli Club | 2–3 | Al-Riffa | Riffa, Bahrain |
| | | | | Stadium: Bahrain National Stadium |

| 23 January 2025 | Al-Muharraq | 1–4 | Al-Khaldiya | Riffa, Bahrain |
| | | | | Stadium: Bahrain National Stadium |

== Final ==
28 January 2025
18:30

| Al-Riffa | 0–1 (a.e.t.) | Al-Khaldiya |
|---|---|---|
| | Report | Azaizeh 26' |

Bahrain National Stadium, Riffa, Bahrain
