= Khalid Bin Hamad Cup =

Football Cup

- Founded: 2025; 1 year ago
- Country: Bahrain
- Confederation: AFC
- Number of clubs: 4
- Current champions: Al-Riffa (1st title) (2024-25)
- Most championships: Al-Khaldiya; Al-Riffa (1 Title)
- Current: 2025–26 Khalid Bin Hamad Cup

The Khalid Bin Hamad Cup (Arabic: كأس خالد بن حمد) is a Bahraini football competition created in 2025 by Khalid bin Hamad Al Khalifa. The tournament is mid-season competition in the Bahraini football season calendar after originally scheduled to kickoff the season. its the successor to Bahraini Crown Prince Cup where it continues the same format where the top 4 teams of the previous Bahraini Premier League qualify to the tournament.

Al-Khaldiya were crowned inaugural champions

== Results ==
Season	Winner	Result	Runner-up	Stadium
2024-25	Al-Khaldiya	2–0	Al-Riffa	Bahrain National Stadium, Riffa, Bahrain
2025-26	Al-Riffa	1-1 (8-7)	Al-Muharraq	Bahrain National Stadium, Riffa, Bahrain

== Performances ==
=== Performances by club ===
Club	Titles	Winners	Runners-up	Semi-Finalist
Al-Khaldiya	1	2024-25	-	2025-26
Al-Riffa	1	2025-26	2024-25	-
Al Ahli	0	-	-	2024-25
Al-Muharraq	0	-	2025-26	2024-25
Sitra	0	-	-	2025-26
