= Nasser Al-Shatti =

Kuwaiti football manager (born 1986)

Personal information
- Date of birth: 14 July 1986 (age 40)
- Place of birth: Kuwait City, Kuwait
- Height: 1.71 m (5 ft 7 in)
- Position: Midfielder

Team information
- Current team: Al-Arabi (head coach)

Youth career
- Al-Arabi

Senior career*
Years	Team	Apps	(Gls)
2005–2007	Al-Arabi	18	(1)

Managerial career
- 2015–2017: Al-Arabi U-19
- 2017: Al-Arabi
- 2021–2022: Qadsia U-21
- 2022–2023: Qadsia
- 2024–2025: Al-Arabi
- 2025: Al-Salmiya
- 2025-: Al-Arabi
- * Club domestic league appearances and goals

Nasser Al-Shatti (born 14 July 1986) is a retired professional footballer who played as a Midfielder. He is currently the head coach of Al-Arabi.

== Club career ==
Nasser was called up through Al-Arabi’s youth system, alongside the likes of Ahmad Abdulghafour, Ali Maqseed. played for the first team for 2 seasons between 2005 and 2007 ultimately left football to continue his degree in sports and further on a football manager.

== Coaching career ==
Nasser starting his career Al-Arabi’s youth division Under 19’s for 2 years training the likes of Bader Al-Fadhel, Abdullah Ammar and Khaled Al-Mershed.

=== Al-Arabi ===
Nasser’s first; first team stint was with Al-Arabi signed on 7 March 2017 on a short term deal expiring at the end of the 2016-17 season. Nasser brought up multiple new names from his youth division at the time such as Bader Al-Fadhel. Ultimately leaving the club in July.

=== Qadsia ===
On 31 May 2021, Nasser was announced as the head coach of Qadsia Under 21’s which he left his position mid season. 2 months later was signed to the first team on 14 February 2022 he took charge of the team until 22 September 2022

=== Return to Al-Arabi ===
Nasser was announced to take over Darko Nestorović’s position until the end of the 2024-25 season as history repeats itself. Nasser brought youth players such as Yousef Majed and Abdulwahab Al-Awadi. After a successful run came to an unsatisfying end losing the Kuwait Premier League on the final week and losing Kuwait Crown Prince Cup Final to Kuwait SC and the postponed Kuwait Emir Cup put Nasser’s job on hold. On 27 June it was announced that Nasser and his crew would leave the team.

=== Al-Salmiya ===
On 11 July 2025, Al-Salmiya announced Nasser as the new manager. after 1 match Al-Shatti resigned from his position after FIFA announced the club’s transfer ban, where all signings prior are not eligible to participate.

== Managerial statistics ==
As of match played 28 January 2026

Managerial record by team and tenure
Team	Nat.	From	To	Record							
Team	Nat.	From	To	G	W	D	L	GF	GA	GD	Win %
Al-Arabi	(Kuwait)	7 March 2017	31 May 2017	15	7	5	3	31	20	+11	46.67
Qadsia	(Kuwait)	14 February 2022	22 September 2022	14	6	1	7	16	21	−5	42.86
Al-Arabi	(Kuwait)	3 April 2024	31 May 2025	42	28	8	6	71	34	+37	66.67
Al-Salmiya	(Kuwait)	11 July 2025	17 September 2025	1	0	0	1	0	1	−1	0.00
Al-Arabi	(Kuwait)	15 November 2025	17 July 2026	21	10	4	7	35	18	+17	47.62
Total				81	45	15	21	151	72	+79	55.56
