= Al-Khaldiya SC =

Bahraini association football club

Al-Khaldiya
- Full name: Al-Khaldiya Sports Club
- Nickname: Lions of Bahrain
- Founded: 27 October 2020; 5 years ago
- Ground: Bahrain National Stadium; Riffa
- Capacity: 24,000
- Chairman: Isa bin Hamad Al-Khalifa
- Manager: Lassaad Chabbi
- League: Premier League
- 2025–26: 2nd of 12
Home colours	Away colours

Al-Khaldiya Sports Club, also known as Al Khalidiyah, is a professional football club based in Northern Riffa, Bahrain, that competes in the Bahraini Premier League, the top domestic football competition. It is the newest formed football club in Bahrain, established in 2020. The home ground of the team is Bahrain National Stadium with a capacity of 28,900. The club's name Al-Khaldiya ("الخالدية") means eternity.

== History ==
Al-Khaldiya Sports Club was formed on 27 October 2020 and started off play in the Bahraini Second Division. In their first season, they finished 2nd with 12 wins, five draws, and just one loss, getting promoted to the Bahraini Premier League. In the qualifying round of the King's Cup, they beat Bahrain SC 6–1 but lost 1–0 to Al Riffa in the round of 16.

=== Season 2021–22 ===
Season 2021–22 was the first season of the club in the top-flight of Bahraini football. Huge names of Bahrain football and 7 regular national team players were brought into the club. Croatian coach and Asian Champions League winner Dragan Talajić signed with the club. Instantly from an underdog position, the club became one of the most powerful teams in Bahrain. On 29 December 2021, the club reached the semifinals of the Bahrain King Cup and will play the semifinals on 5 February 2022 becoming the first club to do so in the first top-flight season of Bahrain football. On 10 February, Talajić took Al Khaldiya's side to the King of Bahrain Cup 2022 Final for the first time in the club's history. On 5 March, Al Khaldiya won the Bahraini King's Cup against East Riffa Club winning the first-ever top-tier trophy in the history of the club.

== Players ==
Note: Flags indicate national team as defined under FIFA eligibility rules; some limited exceptions apply. Players may hold more than one non-FIFA nationality.

No.	Pos.	Nation	Player
1	GK	BHR	Abdulla Al-Thawadi
2	DF	BHR	Sayed Dhiya Saeed
3	DF	BHR	Mohamed Adel
4	DF	BHR	Ahmed Bughammar
5	MF	SEN	Seydina Dabo
6	DF	ALG	Tarek Bouabta
7	MF	BHR	Prince Aggreh
8	MF	BHR	Mohamed Al-Hardan
9	FW	BRA	Gleison
11	FW	BHR	Ismail Abdullatif
13	DF	BHR	Abdulla Al-Haza'a
14	MF	JOR	Nizar Al-Rashdan
15	DF	MLI	Moussa Coulibaly
16	MF	EGY	Seif Issameldin
17	MF	ALG	Malik Raiah
19	MF	BRA	Luiz Fernando

No.	Pos.	Nation	Player
20	GK	BHR	Sayed Shubbar Alawi
21	MF	SEN	Dominique Mendy
22	DF	MAR	Ayoub El Amloud
23	FW	BHR	Mohamed Al-Romaihi
26	FW	CHA	Othman Alhaj
27	FW	BHR	Ali Abdulla
30	MF	BHR	Walid Al-Tayeb
33	GK	BHR	Mohamed Abdulhakeem
41	MF	BHR	Ebrahim Al-Obaidili
44	GK	BHR	Mohamed El-Garably
45	FW	BHR	Mahdi Abduljabbar
66	MF	BRA	Lucas Salinas
70	MF	KSA	Bader Bashir
89	DF	BHR	Ahmed Merza
99	FW	JOR	Ali Al-Azaizeh
—	FW	CRO	Domagoj Drožđek

== Managerial history ==
Manager	Season
(Bahrain) Mohammad Al-Shamlan	July 2021 –30 November 2021
(Croatia) Dragan Talajić	11 December 2021–1 June 2022
(Portugal) Bruno Pereira	3 August 2022–10 December 2022
(Croatia) Dalibor Starčević	11 December 2022–30 June 2023
(Algeria) Miloud Hamdi	1 July 2023–13 December 2023
(Bahrain) Ali Ashoor	1 December 2023–15 November 2025

== Honours ==
- Bahraini Premier League: 2

2022–23, 2023–24

- Bahraini King's Cup: 2

2021-22, 2024-25

- Bahraini Super Cup: 4

2022-23, 2023-24, 2024-25, 2025-26

- Khalid Bin Hamad Cup: 1

2024-25
