= 2022–23 in Bahraini football =

67th competitive association football season in Bahrain

Football in Bahrain
- Season: 2022–23

Men's football
- Premier League: Al-Khaldiya
- Second Division: Al-Najma
- King's Cup: Al-Hala
- FA Cup: Manama
- Super Cup: Al-Khaldiya

The 2022–23 season was the 67th competitive association football season in Bahrain.

== National teams ==
=== Bahrain national football team ===
==== Friendlies ====
27 May 2022	Bahrain	2–0	Myanmar	Bangkok, Thailand
19:00 UTC+7	89' (pen.); 90+1'	Report		Stadium: BG Stadium

31 May 2022	Thailand	1–2	Bahrain	Thanya Buri, Thailand
19:00 UTC+7	Dangda 4' (pen.)	Report	Al-Khatal 45+1'; Isa 90+1'	Stadium: BG Stadium

23 September 2022	Bahrain	1–2	Cape Verde	Riffa, Bahrain
18:30 UTC+3	Haram 29' (pen.)	Report	Diney 12'; 54' (o.g.)	Stadium: Bahrain National Stadium; Referee: Ahmed Al-Kaf (Oman)

27 September 2022	Bahrain	0–2	Panama	Riffa, Bahrain
18:30 UTC+3		Report	Murillo 18'; Díaz 46'	Stadium: Bahrain National Stadium; Referee: Faisal Nasser Al Qahtani (Saudi Arabia)

11 November 2022	Bahrain	2–2	Canada	Riffa, Bahrain
18:30 UTC+3	Al-Humaidan 14'; Helal 65' (pen.)	Report	Koné 6'; Haram 81' (o.g.)	Stadium: Bahrain National Stadium; Referee: Abdullah Jamali (Kuwait)

18 November 2022	Bahrain	1–5	Serbia	Arad, Bahrain
18:30 UTC+3	Yusuf Helal 15' (pen.)	Report	Tadić 8', 50'; Vlahović 51'; Đuričić 87'; Jović 89'	Stadium: Al Muharraq Stadium

25 March 2023	Bahrain	1–2	Palestine	Arad, Bahrain
21:30 UTC+3	Saeed 80'	Report	Termanini 51'; Batran 61'	Stadium: Al Muharraq Stadium; Referee: Mohammad Ghabayen (Jordan)

28 March 2023	Bahrain	1–0	Syria	Arad, Bahrain
21:30 UTC+3	Al-Khalasi 43'	Report		Stadium: Al Muharraq Stadium; Referee: Yousif Saeed Hasan (Iraq)

==== AFC Asian Cup qualification ====
===== Third round – Group E =====
Pos	Team	Pld	W	D	L	GF	GA	GD	Pts	Qualification	Bahrain	Malaysia	Turkmenistan	Bangladesh
1	Bahrain	3	3	0	0	5	1	+4	9	2023 AFC Asian Cup	—	—	1–0	2–0
2	Malaysia (H)	3	2	0	1	8	4	+4	6	2023 AFC Asian Cup	1–2	—	—	4–1
3	Turkmenistan	3	1	0	2	3	5	−2	3		—	1–3	—	—
4	Bangladesh	3	0	0	3	2	8	−6	0		—	—	1–2	—

Source: AFC
(H) Hosts

8 June 2022 1	Bahrain	2–0	Bangladesh	Kuala Lumpur, Malaysia
17:15 UTC+8	Haram 34'; Al-Aswad 42'	Report		Stadium: Bukit Jalil National Stadium; Attendance: 826; Referee: Tejas Nagvenkar (India)

11 June 2022 2	Malaysia	1–2	Bahrain	Kuala Lumpur, Malaysia
21:00 UTC+8	Sumareh 55'	Report	Haram 57'; Helal 81' (pen.)	Stadium: Bukit Jalil National Stadium; Attendance: 63,925; Referee: Sadullo Gulmurodi (Tajikistan)

14 June 2022 3	Bahrain	1–0	Turkmenistan	Kuala Lumpur, Malaysia
17:15 UTC+8	Helal 23' (pen.)	Report		Stadium: Bukit Jalil National Stadium; Attendance: 2,970; Referee: Nivon Robesh Gamini (Sri Lanka)

==== Arabian Gulf Cup ====
===== Group B =====
Pos	Team	Pld	W	D	L	GF	GA	GD	Pts	Qualification
1	Bahrain	3	2	1	0	5	3	+2	7	Advance to knockout stage
2	Qatar	3	1	1	1	4	3	+1	4	Advance to knockout stage
3	Kuwait	3	1	1	1	2	3	−1	4	
4	United Arab Emirates	3	0	1	2	2	4	−2	1	

Source: AGCFF
Rules for classification: Group stage tiebreakers

7 January 2023 1	Bahrain	2–1	United Arab Emirates	Basra, Iraq
16:15 UTC+3	Al-Aswad 60'; Al-Shaikh 77'	Report	Tagliabúe 90+2'	Stadium: Al-Minaa Olympic Stadium; Referee: Ahmed Al-Kaf (Oman)

10 January 2023 2	Qatar	1–2	Bahrain	Basra, Iraq
19:15 UTC+3	Alaaedin 34'	Report	Waad 72' (o.g.); Helal 89' (pen.)	Stadium: Al-Minaa Olympic Stadium; Referee: Ilgiz Tantashev (Uzbekistan)

13 January 2023 3	Bahrain	1–1	Kuwait	Basra, Iraq
18:00 UTC+3	Abdullatif 26'	Report	Al-Khaldi 45'	Stadium: Basra International Stadium; Referee: István Kovács (Romania)

===== Knockout stage =====
16 January 2023 Semi-finals	Bahrain	0–1	Oman	Basra, Iraq
20:15 UTC+3		Report	Al-Yahmadi 83'	Stadium: Al-Minaa Olympic Stadium; Referee: Adel Al-Naqbi (United Arab Emirates)

=== Bahrain national under-23 football team ===
==== Friendlies ====
24 July 2022	Bahrain	3–2	Oman
17:00 UTC+3	30'; 34'; 57'	Report	40'; 68'

15 January 2023	Bahrain	1–1	Jordan
17:30 UTC+3		Report

24 March 2023	Bahrain	3–3	Estonia
18:30 UTC+0		Report

==== WAFF U-23 Championship ====
===== Group B =====
Pos	Team	Pld	W	D	L	GF	GA	GD	Pts	Qualification
1	Saudi Arabia (H)	2	1	0	1	3	2	+1	3	Advance to knockout stage
2	Syria	2	1	0	1	3	3	0	3	Advance to knockout stage
3	Bahrain	2	1	0	1	2	3	−1	3	

Updated to match(es) played on 6 November 2022. Source: WAFF
Rules for classification: Group stage tiebreakers
(H) Hosts

3 November 2022 1	Bahrain	2–1	Syria	Jeddah, Saudi Arabia
21:00 UTC+3	Abdulkarim 32'; Al-Romaihi 90+3'	Report	Rihanieh 90+2'	Stadium: Sports Hall at King Abdullah Sports City; Attendance: 750; Referee: Ali Al Ashkar (Lebanon)

9 November 2022 2	Saudi Arabia	2–0	Bahrain	Jeddah, Saudi Arabia
21:00 UTC+3	A. Al-Ghamdi 30'; Al-Johani 57'	Report		Stadium: Sports Hall at King Abdullah Sports City; Attendance: 157; Referee: Mohammed Al Noori (Syria)

===== Knockout stage =====
13 November 2022 Fifth place play-off	Lebanon	0–1	Bahrain	Jeddah, Saudi Arabia
17:00 UTC+3		Report	Abdul Qayoom 81'	Stadium: Prince Abdullah Al Faisal Stadium; Attendance: 120; Referee: Mohammed Al Noori (Syria)

=== Bahrain national under-20 football team ===
==== Arab Cup U-20 ====
===== Group E =====
Pos	Team	Pld	W	D	L	GF	GA	GD	Pts	Qualification
1	Tunisia	2	2	0	0	9	0	+9	6	Advance to knockout stage
2	Bahrain	2	1	0	1	2	3	−1	3	
3	Djibouti	2	0	0	2	0	8	−8	0	

Source: UAFA

22 July 2022 1	Tunisia	3–0	Bahrain	Abha, Saudi Arabia
17:00 UTC+3	Senana 45'; Derbali 62'; Abid 86'	Report		Stadium: Prince Sultan bin Abdul Aziz Stadium; Referee: Sadam Omara (Jordan)

25 July 2022 2	Bahrain	2–0	Djibouti	Abha, Saudi Arabia
21:00 UTC+3	Muhammed 14' (pen.); Diaa 17'			Stadium: Damac Club Stadium; Referee: Yousif Saeed (Iraq)

===== Ranking of second-places =====
Pos	Grp	Team	Pld	W	D	L	GF	GA	GD	Pts	Qualification
1	F	Palestine	2	1	0	1	5	4	+1	3	Advance to knockout stage
2	B	Yemen	2	1	0	1	3	2	+1	3	Advance to knockout stage
3	D	Oman	2	1	0	1	2	1	+1	3	
4	C	Libya	2	1	0	1	3	3	0	3	
5	E	Bahrain	2	1	0	1	2	3	−1	3	
6	A	Mauritania	2	1	0	1	1	2	−1	3	

Source: UAFA

==== AFC U-20 Asian Cup qualification ====
===== Group B =====
Pos	Team	Pld	W	D	L	GF	GA	GD	Pts	Qualification
1	Qatar	4	4	0	0	14	1	+13	12	Final tournament
2	Bahrain (H)	4	2	1	1	8	3	+5	7	
3	Bangladesh	4	2	1	1	5	4	+1	7	
4	Bhutan	4	1	0	3	4	10	−6	3	
5	Nepal	4	0	0	4	1	14	−13	0	

Source: AFC
Rules for classification: Qualification tiebreakers
(H) Hosts

10 September 2022 1	Bangladesh	0–0	Bahrain	Arad, Bahrain
21:00 UTC+3		Report		Stadium: Al Muharraq Stadium; Attendance: 1,468; Referee: Thoriq Alkatiri (Indonesia)

14 September 2022 2	Bahrain	6–0	Nepal	Arad, Bahrain
21:00 UTC+3	Al-Khalasi 19' (pen.); S. Abdulla 37'; Gadban 67'; Al-Subaiei 84', 88'; Mu. Mohamed 90+1'	Report		Stadium: Al Muharraq Stadium; Attendance: 250; Referee: Ahmed Eisa (United Arab Emirates)

16 September 2022 3	Bahrain	2–1	Bhutan	Arad, Bahrain
21:00 UTC+3	Mu. Mohamed 20' (pen.); Isa 60'	Report	Limbu 76'	Stadium: Al Muharraq Stadium; Attendance: 205; Referee: Thoriq Alkatiri (Indonesia)

18 September 2022 1	Qatar	2–0	Bahrain	Arad, Bahrain
21:00 UTC+3	Al-Sharshani 47'; Al-Hussein 52'	Report		Stadium: Al Muharraq Stadium; Attendance: 200; Referee: Yudai Yamamoto (Japan)

===== Ranking of second-placed teams =====
Due to groups having a different number of teams, the results against the fifth-placed teams in five-team groups were not counted in the ranking.

Pos	Grp	Team	Pld	W	D	L	GF	GA	GD	Pts	Qualification
1	F	Vietnam	3	2	0	1	11	4	+7	6	Final tournament
2	J	Kyrgyzstan	3	2	0	1	8	1	+7	6	Final tournament
3	A	China	3	2	0	1	8	2	+6	6	Final tournament
4	H	Iraq	3	2	0	1	6	3	+3	6 (Note: Disciplinary points: Iraq –5, Syria –8, Thailand –10.)	Final tournament
5	D	Syria	3	2	0	1	6	3	+3	6	Final tournament
6	G	Thailand	3	2	0	1	6	3	+3	6	
7	I	Lebanon	3	2	0	1	7	5	+2	6	
8	C	Yemen	3	1	1	1	4	4	0	4	
9	E	Mongolia	3	1	1	1	7	8	−1	4	
10	B	Bahrain	3	1	1	1	2	3	−1	4	

Source: Group stage
Rules for classification: 1) points; 2) goal difference; 3) goals scored; 4) disciplinary points; 5) drawing of lots.

=== Bahrain national under-17 football team ===
==== AFC U-17 Asian Cup qualification ====
===== Group C =====
Pos	Team	Pld	W	D	L	GF	GA	GD	Pts	Qualification
1	Qatar	4	3	1	0	9	4	+5	10	Final tournament
2	Oman (H)	4	2	1	1	5	3	+2	7	
3	Iraq	4	1	2	1	4	2	+2	5	
4	Bahrain	4	1	1	2	2	6	−4	4	
5	Lebanon	4	0	1	3	2	7	−5	1	

Source: AFC
Rules for classification: Qualification tiebreakers
(H) Hosts

1 October 2022 1	Bahrain	1–0	Lebanon	Muscat, Oman
20:45 UTC+3	Bassam 68' (pen.)	Report		Stadium: Sultan Qaboos Sports Complex; Referee: Kim Hee-gon (South Korea)

3 October 2022 2	Bahrain	1–1	Qatar	Muscat, Oman
20:45 UTC+3	Bassam 55'	Report	Shahabi 10'	Stadium: Sultan Qaboos Sports Complex; Referee: Alex King (Australia)

5 October 2022 3	Oman	2–0	Bahrain	Muscat, Oman
17:00 UTC+3	Al-Breiki 45+2' (pen.), 77'	Report		Stadium: Sultan Qaboos Sports Complex; Referee: Khalid Al-Turais (Saudi Arabia)

7 October 2022 4	Iraq	3–0	Bahrain	Muscat, Oman
17:00 UTC+3	Al Darraji 47'; Ali 70'; Jawad 85'	Report		Stadium: Sultan Qaboos Sports Complex; Referee: Alex King (Australia)

=== Bahrain women's national under-17 football team ===
==== AFC U-17 Women's Asian Cup qualification ====
===== Group C =====
Pos	Team	Pld	W	D	L	GF	GA	GD	Pts	Qualification
1	Vietnam (H)	2	2	0	0	8	0	+8	6	Second round
2	Uzbekistan	2	1	0	1	2	4	−2	3	
3	Palestine	2	0	0	2	1	7	−6	0	
4	Bahrain	0	0	0	0	0	0	0	0	Withdrew

Rules for classification: Qualification tiebreakers
(H) Hosts

22 April 2023 1	Vietnam	Cancelled	Bahrain	Hanoi, Vietnam
--:-- UTC+3		Report		Stadium: Vietnam YFTC Field No. 3
Note: Bahrain withdrew from the tournament.

24 April 2023 2	Bahrain	Cancelled	Uzbekistan	Hanoi, Vietnam
--:-- UTC+3		Report		Stadium: Vietnam YFTC Field No. 3
Note: Bahrain withdrew from the tournament.

30 April 2023 3	Palestine	Cancelled	Bahrain	Hanoi, Vietnam
--:-- UTC+3		Report		Stadium: Vietnam YFTC Field No. 3
Note: Bahrain withdrew from the tournament.

== Men's football ==
=== AFC Cup ===
==== Group stage ====
===== Group B =====
Pos	Team	Pld	W	D	L	GF	GA	GD	Pts	Qualification	ARA	RIF	DHO	SAK
1	(Kuwait) Al-Arabi (H)	3	2	1	0	5	3	+2	7	Zonal semi-finals	—	—	—	1–0
2	(Bahrain) Al-Riffa	3	2	0	1	8	6	+2	6	Zonal semi-finals	2–3	—	—	3–1
3	(Oman) Dhofar	3	1	1	1	6	4	+2	4		1–1	2–3	—	—
4	(Palestine) Shabab Al-Khalil	3	0	0	3	1	7	−6	0		—	—	0–3	—

Source: AFC
Rules for classification: Tiebreakers
(H) Hosts

===== Group C =====
Pos	Team	Pld	W	D	L	GF	GA	GD	Pts	Qualification	EAR	TIS	NEJ	HAQ
1	(Bahrain) East Riffa (H)	3	1	2	0	5	3	+2	5	Zonal semi-finals	—	2–0	—	2–2
2	(Syria) Tishreen	3	1	1	1	3	3	0	4 (Note: Head-to-head points: Tishreen 3, Nejmeh 0.)		—	—	3–1	0–0
3	(Lebanon) Nejmeh	3	1	1	1	4	4	0	4		1–1	—	—	—
4	(Palestine) Hilal Al-Quds	3	0	2	1	2	4	−2	2		—	—	0–2	—

Source: AFC
Rules for classification: Tiebreakers
(H) Hosts

===== Ranking of runner-up teams =====
Pos	Grp	Team	Pld	W	D	L	GF	GA	GD	Pts	Qualification
1	B	(Bahrain) Al-Riffa	3	2	0	1	8	6	+2	6	Zonal semi-finals
2	A	Al-Kuwait	3	1	2	0	3	2	+1	5	
3	C	(Syria) Tishreen	3	1	1	1	3	3	0	4	

Source: AFC
Rules for classification: 1) Points; 2) Goal difference; 3) Goals scored; 4) Disciplinary points; 5) Drawing of lots.

==== Knockout stage ====
===== Zonal semi-finals =====
West Asia Zone
Team 1	Score	Team 2
East Riffa (Bahrain)	1–1 (a.e.t.) (4–5 p)	(Bahrain) Al-Riffa

===== Zonal finals =====
West Asia Zone
Team 1	Score	Team 2
Al-Seeb (Oman)	4–0	(Bahrain) Al-Riffa

=== Arab Club Champions Cup ===
==== Qualifying rounds ====
===== First qualifying round =====
Team 1	Agg.	Team 2	1st leg	2nd leg
Al-Hilal Omdurman (Sudan)	4–2	(Bahrain) Manama Club	3–0	1–2
Al-Muharraq (Bahrain)	2–2 (5–4 p)	(Oman) Al-Seeb	2–0	0–2

===== Second qualifying round =====
Team 1	Agg.	Team 2	1st leg	2nd leg
US Monastir (Tunisia)	3–0	(Bahrain) Al-Muharraq	2–0	1–0

=== Leagues ===
==== Premier League ====
Pos	Team	Pld	W	D	L	GF	GA	GD	Pts	Qualification or relegation
1	Al-Khaldiya (C)	22	12	6	4	45	23	+22	42	
2	Manama	22	11	8	3	35	16	+19	41	
3	Al-Muharraq	22	10	10	2	34	12	+22	40	
4	Al-Riffa	22	11	6	5	37	19	+18	39	
5	Sitra	22	10	8	4	30	20	+10	38	
6	Al-Ahli	22	7	10	5	24	23	+1	31	
7	Al-Hidd	22	7	6	9	29	38	−9	27 (Note: Al-Hidd: 4 pts, Al-Shabab: 1 pts.)	
8	Al-Shabab	22	7	6	9	21	25	−4	27	
9	East Riffa (O)	22	5	9	8	24	26	−2	24 (Note: Budaiya were deducted 6 points after they walked off the field to protest the officiating during the match against East Riffa. The match was originally a 2–1 win for East Riffa but they ended up being awarded a 3–0 victory.)	Qualification for Relegation play-offs
10	Al-Hala (O)	22	5	6	11	22	34	−12	21	Qualification for Relegation play-offs
11	Bahrain SC (R)	22	4	7	11	22	32	−10	19	Relegation to Bahraini Second Division
12	Budaiya (R)	22	1	2	19	10	65	−55	−1	Relegation to Bahraini Second Division

Source: Soccerway
Rules for classification: Points, Head-to-head points, Head-to-head goal difference, Head-to-head goals scored, Total goal difference, Total goals scored
(C) Champions; (O) Play-off winners; (R) Relegated

==== Second Division ====
Pos	Team	Pld	W	D	L	GF	GA	GD	Pts	Qualification or relegation
1	Al-Najma (C, P)	22	17	4	1	59	19	+40	55	Promotion to Bahraini Premier League
2	Busaiteen (P)	22	12	5	5	41	23	+18	41	Promotion to Bahraini Premier League
3	A'Ali	22	10	7	5	33	21	+12	37	Qualification for Promotion play-offs
4	Al-Ittifaq Maqaba	22	9	5	8	28	27	+1	32	Qualification for Promotion play-offs
5	Umm Al-Hassam	22	8	8	6	29	29	0	32	
6	Buri	22	8	7	7	31	31	0	31	
7	Qalali	22	7	8	7	33	26	+7	29	
8	Malkiya	22	7	7	8	28	28	0	28	
9	Al-Ittihad	22	6	9	7	24	29	−5	27	
10	Isa Town	22	7	5	10	33	39	−6	26	
11	Etehad Al-Reef	22	3	4	15	18	51	−33	13	
12	Al-Tadamun	22	0	7	15	14	48	−34	7	

Source: Soccerway
Rules for classification: Points, Goal difference, Goals scored, Head-to-head points, Head-to-head goal difference, Head-to-head goals scored
(C) Champions; (P) Promoted

==== Play-offs ====
Pos	Team	Pld	W	D	L	GF	GA	GD	Pts	Qualification or relegation
1	East Riffa	3	1	2	0	4	2	+2	5	Promotion to Bahraini Premier League
2	Al-Hala	3	1	2	0	3	2	+1	5	Promotion to Bahraini Premier League
3	Al-Ittifaq Maqaba	3	1	0	2	3	5	−2	3	Relegation to Bahraini Second Division
4	A'Ali	3	0	2	1	4	5	−1	2	Relegation to Bahraini Second Division

Source: Soccerway

=== Cup competitions ===
==== King's Cup ====
===== Final =====
7 April 2023
20:45

Al-Ahli	0–0 (a.e.t.)	Al-Hala
	Report
Penalties
Penalty scored Penalty missed	5–6	Penalty scored Penalty missed

Khalifa Sports City Stadium, Manama

==== FA Cup ====
===== Final =====
27 March 2023
21:45

Al-Khaldiya	2–2	Manama
Mendy 14'; Frioui 29'	Report	12'; 51'
Penalties
Penalty scored Penalty missed	4–5	Penalty scored

==== Super Cup ====
15 September 2022
18:30

Al-Riffa	0–2	Al-Khaldiya
	Report	58'; 60'

Bahrain National Stadium, Riffa
