= 2023–24 in Bahraini football =

68th competitive association football season in Bahrain

Football in Bahrain
- Season: 2023–24

Men's football
- Premier League: Al-Khaldiya
- Second Division: Bahrain SC
- King's Cup: Al-Ahli
- FA Cup: Manama
- Super Cup: Al-Khaldiya

The 2023–24 season was the 68th competitive association football season in Bahrain.

== National teams ==
=== Bahrain national football team ===
==== Friendlies ====
7 September 2023	Bahrain	1–3	Kuwait	Dubai, United Arab Emirates
19:00 UTC+4	Helal 72'	Report	Al-Dhefiri 5'; Al-Khaldi 56', 62'	Stadium: Police Officers' Club Stadium

12 September 2023	Bahrain	1–1	Turkmenistan	Dubai, United Arab Emirates
20:00 UTC+4	Marhoon 13'	Report	Çaryýew 29'	Stadium: Police Officers' Club Stadium

12 October 2023	Bahrain	2–0	Kyrgyzstan	Arad, Bahrain
20:00 UTC+4	Abdulwahab 59'; Al-Hashash 85'	Report		Stadium: Al Muharraq Stadium

16 October 2023	Bahrain	1–0	Philippines	Arad, Bahrain
19:00 UTC+3	Al-Khattal	Report		Stadium: Al Muharraq Stadium

6 January 2024	Bahrain	0–2	Australia	Abu Dhabi, United Arab Emirates
17:00 UTC+3		Report	Benaddi 35' (o.g.); Duke 61'	Stadium: Baniyas Stadium; Referee: Mohamed Al-Harmoodi (United Arab Emirates)

==== FIFA World Cup & AFC Asian Cup qualification ====
===== Second round – Group H =====
Pos	Team	Pld	W	D	L	GF	GA	GD	Pts	Qualification	(United Arab Emirates)	(Bahrain)	(Yemen)	(Nepal)
1	United Arab Emirates	6	5	1	0	16	2	+14	16	World Cup qualifying third round and Asian Cup	—	1–1	2–1	4–0
2	Bahrain	6	3	2	1	11	3	+8	11	World Cup qualifying third round and Asian Cup	0–2	—	0–0	3–0
3	Yemen	6	1	2	3	5	9	−4	5	Asian Cup qualifying third round	0–3	0–2	—	2–2
4	Nepal	6	0	1	5	2	20	−18	1	Asian Cup qualifying third round	0–4	0–5	0–2	—

Source: FIFA, AFC
Rules for classification: Tiebreakers

16 November 2023 1	Yemen	0–2	Bahrain	Abha, Saudi Arabia (Note: Yemen played their home matches at a neutral venue due to the ongoing Yemeni civil war.)
21:00 UTC+3		Report	Marhoon 38'; Al Zubaidi 48' (o.g.)	Stadium: Prince Sultan bin Abdul Aziz Stadium; Attendance: 1,291; Referee: Kim Jong-hyeok (South Korea)

21 November 2023 2	Bahrain	0–2	United Arab Emirates	Riffa, Bahrain
18:45 UTC+4		Report	Ramadan 36'; Mabkhout 90' (pen.)	Stadium: Bahrain National Stadium; Attendance: 18,267; Referee: Mohammed Al-Hoish (Saudi Arabia)

21 March 2024 3	Nepal	0–5	Bahrain	Riffa, Bahrain (Note: Nepal played their final two home matches at a neutral venue due to the Dasharath Rangasala failing to meet FIFA standard.)
22:00 UTC+3		Report	Al-Humaidan 2'; Baqer 9'; Madan 45+4'; Al-Khatal 87'; Abdullatif 90+6' (pen.)	Stadium: Bahrain National Stadium; Attendance: 5,041; Referee: Alex King (Australia)

26 March 2024 4	Bahrain	3–0	Nepal	Riffa, Bahrain
22:00 UTC+3	Baqer 7'; Helal 18' (pen.); Al-Aswad 36'	Report		Stadium: Bahrain National Stadium; Attendance: 2,475; Referee: Ryo Tanimoto (Japan)

==== AFC Asian Cup ====
===== Group E =====
Pos	Team	Pld	W	D	L	GF	GA	GD	Pts	Qualification
1	Bahrain	3	2	0	1	3	3	0	6	Advance to knockout stage
2	South Korea	3	1	2	0	8	6	+2	5	Advance to knockout stage
3	Jordan	3	1	1	1	6	3	+3	4	Advance to knockout stage
4	Malaysia	3	0	1	2	3	8	−5	1	

Source: AFC
Rules for classification: Group stage tiebreakers

15 January 2024 1	South Korea	3–1	Bahrain	Al Rayyan, Qatar
14:30 UTC+3	Hwang In-beom 38'; Lee Kang-in 56', 68'	Report	Al-Hashsash 51'	Stadium: Jassim bin Hamad Stadium; Attendance: 8,388; Referee: Ma Ning (China)

20 January 2024 2	Bahrain	1–0	Malaysia	Al Rayyan, Qatar
22:30 UTC+8	Madan 90+6'	Report		Stadium: Jassim Bin Hamad Stadium; Attendance: 10,386; Referee: Ahmed Al-Kaf (Oman)

25 January 2024 3	Jordan	0–1	Bahrain	Al Rayyan, Qatar
14:30 UTC+3		Report	Helal 34'	Stadium: Khalifa International Stadium; Attendance: 39,650; Referee: Omar Al-Ali (United Arab Emirates)

===== Knockout stage =====
31 January 2024 Round of 16	Bahrain	1–3	Japan	Doha, Qatar
14:30 UTC+3	Ueda 64' (o.g.)	Report	Dōan 31'; Kubo 49'; Ueda 72'	Stadium: Al Thumama Stadium; Attendance: 31,832; Referee: Ahmad Al-Ali (Kuwait)

=== Bahrain national under-23 football team ===
==== AFC U-23 Asian Cup qualification ====
===== Group D =====
Pos	Team	Pld	W	D	L	GF	GA	GD	Pts	
1	Japan	3	2	1	0	7	0	+7	7	Final tournament
2	Palestine	3	2	0	1	3	2	+1	6	
3	Bahrain (H)	3	1	1	1	3	2	+1	4	
4	Pakistan	3	0	0	3	2	11	−9	0	

Source: AFC
Rules for classification: Qualification tiebreakers
(H) Hosts

6 September 2023 1	Bahrain	0–1	Palestine	Arad, Bahrain
18:30 UTC+3		Report	Qunbar 90+1'	Stadium: Al Muharraq Stadium; Attendance: 317; Referee: Sadullo Gulmurodi (Tajikistan)

9 September 2023 2	Pakistan	1–3	Bahrain	Arad, Bahrain
18:30 UTC+3	Ghazi 70'	Report	Haider 25', 48'; Abdulkarim 49'	Stadium: Al Muharraq Stadium; Attendance: 180; Referee: Zaid Thamer Mohammed (Syria)

12 September 2023 3	Japan	0–0	Bahrain	Arad, Bahrain
18:30 UTC+3		Report		Stadium: Al Muharraq Stadium; Attendance: 271; Referee: Sadullo Gulmurodi (Tajikistan)

==== Asian Games ====
===== Group E =====
Pos	Team	Pld	W	D	L	GF	GA	GD	Pts	Qualification
1	China (H)	3	2	1	0	9	1	+8	7	Knockout stage
2	India	3	1	1	1	3	6	−3	4	Knockout stage
3	Myanmar	3	1	1	1	2	5	−3	4	Knockout stage
4	Bangladesh	3	0	1	2	0	2	−2	1	

Source: Football – Men – Groups
Rules for classification: Group stage tiebreakers
(H) Hosts

Pos	Team	Pld	W	D	L	GF	GA	GD	Pts	Qualification
1	Iran	3	2	1	0	7	0	+7	7	Knockout stage
2	Saudi Arabia	3	2	1	0	6	1	+5	7	Knockout stage
3	Vietnam	3	1	0	2	5	9	−4	3	
4	Mongolia	3	0	0	3	2	10	−8	0	

Source: Football – Men – Groups
Rules for classification: Group stage tiebreakers

Pos	Team	Pld	W	D	L	GF	GA	GD	Pts	Qualification
1	Uzbekistan	2	2	0	0	3	1	+2	6	Knockout stage
2	Hong Kong	2	0	0	2	1	3	−2	0	Knockout stage
3	Syria	0	0	0	0	0	0	0	0	Withdrew
4	Afghanistan	0	0	0	0	0	0	0	0	Withdrew

Source: Football – Men – Groups
Rules for classification: Group stage tiebreakers

Pos	Team	Pld	W	D	L	GF	GA	GD	Pts	Qualification
1	Japan	2	2	0	0	4	1	+3	6	Knockout stage
2	Palestine	2	0	1	1	0	1	−1	1	Knockout stage
3	Qatar	2	0	1	1	1	3	−2	1	Knockout stage

Source: Football – Men – Groups
Rules for classification: Group stage tiebreakers

Pos	Team	Pld	W	D	L	GF	GA	GD	Pts	Qualification
1	South Korea	3	3	0	0	16	0	+16	9	Knockout stage
2	Bahrain	3	0	2	1	2	5	−3	2	Knockout stage
3	Thailand	3	0	2	1	2	6	−4	2	Knockout stage
4	Kuwait	3	0	2	1	2	11	−9	2	

Source: Football – Men – Groups
Rules for classification: Group stage tiebreakers

Pos	Team	Pld	W	D	L	GF	GA	GD	Pts	Qualification
1	North Korea	3	3	0	0	4	0	+4	9	Knockout stage
2	Kyrgyzstan	3	1	0	2	4	4	0	3 (Note: Head-to-head goal differences: Kyrgyzstan 4–3, Indonesia 2–1, Chinese Taipei 2–4)	Knockout stage
3	Indonesia	3	1	0	2	2	2	0	3	Knockout stage
4	Chinese Taipei	3	1	0	2	2	6	−4	3	

Source: Football – Men – Groups
Rules for classification: Group stage tierbreakers
Notes:

Pos	Grp	Team	Pld	W	D	L	GF	GA	GD	Pts	Qualification
1	F	Indonesia	2	1	0	1	2	1	+1	3	Knockout stage
2	D	Qatar	2	0	1	1	1	3	−2	1	Knockout stage
3	E	Thailand	2	0	1	1	1	5	−4	1	Knockout stage
4	A	Myanmar	2	0	1	1	1	5	−4	1	Knockout stage
5	B	Vietnam	2	0	0	2	1	7	−6	0	

Source: Football – Men – Groups

19 September 2023 1	Bahrain	1–1	Thailand	Jinhua, China
16:00 UTC+8	Abdulkarim 42'	Report	Purachet 90+5'	Stadium: Jinhua Stadium; Attendance: 2,048; Referee: Sayodjon Zainiddinov (Tajikistan)

21 September 2023 2	Kuwait	1–1	Bahrain	Jinhua, China
16:00 UTC+8	Al-Awadi 74'	Report	Redha 52'	Stadium: Jinhua Stadium; Attendance: 1,250; Referee: Yudai Yamamoto (Japan)

24 September 2023 3	South Korea	3–0	Bahrain	Jinhua, China
19:30 UTC+8	Lee Han-beom 61'; Paik Seung-ho 74'; Goh Young-jun 84'	Report		Stadium: Jinhua Stadium; Attendance: 19,084; Referee: Yousif Saeed Hasan (Iraq)

===== Knockout stage =====
27 September 2023 Round of 16	North Korea	2–0	Bahrain	Jinhua, China
16:30 UTC+8	Kang Kuk-chol 45+5'; Kim Kuk-bom 63'	Report		Stadium: Zhejiang Normal University East Stadium; Attendance: 7,321; Referee: Adel Al Naqbi (United Arab Emirates)

== Men's football ==
=== AFC Cup ===
==== Qualifying play-offs ====
===== Play-off round =====
West Zone
Team 1	Score	Team 2
Al-Khaldiya (Bahrain)	2–3	(Oman) Al-Nahda

==== Group stage ====
===== Group C =====
Pos	Team	Pld	W	D	L	GF	GA	GD	Pts	Qualification	RIF	ZWR	ARA	NEJ
1	(Bahrain) Al-Riffa	6	4	1	1	15	5	+10	13	Zonal semi-finals	—	1–1	2–1	6–1
2	(Iraq) Al-Zawraa	6	3	2	1	11	7	+4	11		2–1	—	1–2	4–1
3	(Kuwait) Al-Arabi	6	2	2	2	6	8	−2	8		0–3	1–1	—	0–0
4	(Lebanon) Nejmeh	6	0	1	5	4	16	−12	1		0–2	1–2	1–2	—

Source: AFC
Rules for classification: Group stage tiebreakers

==== Knockout stage ====
===== Zonal semi-finals =====
West Asia Zone
Team 1	Agg.	Team 2	1st leg	2nd leg
Al-Riffa (Bahrain)	2–4	(Oman) Al-Nahda	1–1	1–3 (a.e.t.)

=== Leagues ===
==== Premier League ====
Pos	Team	Pld	W	D	L	GF	GA	GD	Pts	Qualification or relegation
1	Al-Khaldiya (C)	22	12	8	2	45	18	+27	44	Qualification for the AFC Champions League Two group stage
2	Al-Riffa	22	10	7	5	35	26	+9	37 (Note: Al-Riffa: 4 pts, Al-Muharraq: 1 pts.)	Qualification for the AGCFF Gulf Club Champions League group stage
3	Al-Muharraq	22	9	10	3	40	28	+12	37	
4	Al-Ahli	22	9	6	7	32	30	+2	33 (Note: Al-Ahli: 4 pts, Manama: 1 pts.)	Qualification for the AFC Champions League Two qualifying play-offs (Note: Al-Ahli qualified for the AFC Champions League Two qualifying play-offs as the 2023–24 Bahraini King's Cup winners.)
5	Manama	22	9	6	7	28	26	+2	33	
6	Al-Najma	22	7	6	9	40	42	−2	27 (Note: Tied on head-to-head tiebreakers. Overall goal difference used.)	
7	Al-Shabab	22	7	6	9	28	33	−5	27	
8	Sitra	22	5	11	6	29	33	−4	26 (Note: Sitra: 6 pts, Al-Hidd: 5 pts, East Riffa: 3 pts.)	
9	Al-Hidd (R)	22	6	8	8	29	33	−4	26	Qualification for Relegation play-offs
10	East Riffa (O)	22	6	8	8	27	29	−2	26	Qualification for Relegation play-offs
11	Al-Hala (R)	22	6	2	14	17	41	−24	20	Relegation to Bahraini Second Division
12	Busaiteen (R)	22	4	6	12	26	37	−11	18	Relegation to Bahraini Second Division

Source: Soccerway
Rules for classification: Points, Head-to-head points, Head-to-head goal difference, Head-to-head goals scored, Total goal difference, Total goals scored
(C) Champions; (O) Play-off winners; (R) Relegated

==== Second Division ====
Pos	Team	Pld	W	D	L	GF	GA	GD	Pts	Qualification or relegation
1	Bahrain SC (C, P)	22	15	4	3	49	20	+29	49	Promotion to Bahraini Premier League
2	A'Ali (P)	22	13	7	2	46	16	+30	46	Promotion to Bahraini Premier League
3	Malkiya (O, P)	22	12	9	1	37	8	+29	45	Qualification for Promotion play-offs
4	Al-Ittihad	22	13	4	5	39	25	+14	43	Qualification for Promotion play-offs
5	Budaiya	22	11	8	3	32	12	+20	41	
6	Al-Ittifaq Maqaba	22	9	5	8	41	28	+13	32	
7	Isa Town	22	7	6	9	25	31	−6	27	
8	Buri	22	5	9	8	19	27	−8	24	
9	Umm Al-Hassam	22	5	3	14	22	36	−14	18	
10	Qalali	22	5	3	14	15	39	−24	18	
11	Etehad Al-Reef	22	4	5	13	19	55	−36	17	
12	Al-Tadamun	22	0	3	19	8	55	−47	3	

Source: Soccerway
Rules for classification: Points, Goal difference, Goals scored, Head-to-head points, Head-to-head goal difference, Head-to-head goals scored
(C) Champions; (O) Play-off winners; (P) Promoted

==== Play-offs ====
Pos	Team	Pld	W	D	L	GF	GA	GD	Pts	Qualification or relegation
1	Malkiya (P)	3	2	1	0	8	4	+4	7	Promotion to Bahraini Premier League
2	East Riffa	3	2	1	0	6	3	+3	7	Promotion to Bahraini Premier League
3	Al-Hidd (R)	3	1	0	2	4	6	−2	3	Relegation to Bahraini Second Division
4	Al-Ittihad	3	0	0	3	2	7	−5	0	Relegation to Bahraini Second Division

Source: Soccerway
(P) Promoted; (R) Relegated

=== Cup competitions ===
==== King's Cup ====
===== Final =====
9 March 2023
18:30

Al-Ahli	1–1 (a.e.t.)	Al-Muharraq
Phoenix 7'	Report	Abdulkarim 84'
Penalties
Penalty scored	4–2	Penalty missed Penalty scored

Bahrain National Stadium, Riffa

==== FA Cup ====
===== Final =====
23 March 2023
21:45

Al-Shabab	0–1	Manama
	Report	36'

==== Super Cup ====
13 September 2024
19:00

Al-Khaldiya	2–0	Al-Hala
Abduljabbar 70'; Al-Yahyaei 90+5'	Report

Khalifa Sports City Stadium, Isa Town
