= 2024–25 in Bahraini football =

69th competitive association football season in Bahrain

Football in Bahrain
- Season: 2024–25

The 2024–25 season is the 69th competitive association football season in Bahrain.

== National teams ==
=== Bahrain national football team ===
==== FIFA World Cup & AFC Asian Cup qualification ====
===== Second round – Group H =====
Pos	Team	Pld	W	D	L	GF	GA	GD	Pts	Qualification	(United Arab Emirates)	(Bahrain)	(Yemen)	(Nepal)
1	United Arab Emirates	6	5	1	0	16	2	+14	16	World Cup qualifying third round and Asian Cup	—	1–1	2–1	4–0
2	Bahrain	6	3	2	1	11	3	+8	11	World Cup qualifying third round and Asian Cup	0–2	—	0–0	3–0
3	Yemen	6	1	2	3	5	9	−4	5	Asian Cup qualifying third round	0–3	0–2	—	2–2
4	Nepal	6	0	1	5	2	20	−18	1	Asian Cup qualifying third round	0–4	0–5	0–2	—

Source: FIFA, AFC
Rules for classification: Tiebreakers

6 June 2024 5	Bahrain	0–0	Yemen	Riffa, Bahrain
20:30 UTC+3		Report		Stadium: Bahrain National Stadium; Attendance: 2,632; Referee: Nazmi Nasaruddin (Malaysia)

11 June 2024 6	United Arab Emirates	1–1	Bahrain	Dubai, United Arab Emirates
21:00 UTC+4	Adil 10'	Report	Abduljabbar 4'	Stadium: Rashid Stadium; Attendance: 953; Referee: Ma Ning (China)

===== Third round – Group C =====
Pos	Team	Pld	W	D	L	GF	GA	GD	Pts	Qualification	(Japan)	(Australia)	(Saudi Arabia)	(Indonesia)	(China)	(Bahrain)
1	Japan	10	7	2	1	30	3	+27	23	2026 FIFA World Cup	—	1–1	0–0	6–0	7–0	2–0
2	Australia	10	5	4	1	16	7	+9	19	2026 FIFA World Cup	1–0	—	0–0	5–1	3–1	0–1
3	Saudi Arabia	10	3	4	3	7	8	−1	13	Fourth round	0–2	1–2	—	1–1	1–0	0–0
4	Indonesia	10	3	3	4	9	20	−11	12	Fourth round	0–4	0–0	2–0	—	1–0	1–0
5	China	10	3	0	7	7	20	−13	9		1–3	0–2	1–2	2–1	—	1–0
6	Bahrain	10	1	3	6	5	16	−11	6		0–5	2–2	0–2	2–2	0–1	—

Source: AFC, FIFA
Rules for classification: Tiebreakers

5 September 2024 1	Australia	0–1	Bahrain	Gold Coast, Australia
20:10 UTC+10		Report	Souttar 89' (o.g.)	Stadium: Robina Stadium; Attendance: 24,644; Referee: Omar Al-Ali (United Arab Emirates)

10 September 2024 2	Bahrain	0–5	Japan	Riffa, Bahrain
19:00 UTC+3		Report	Ueda 37' (pen.), 47'; Morita 61', 64'; Ogawa 81'	Stadium: Bahrain National Stadium; Attendance: 22,729; Referee: Rustam Lutfullin (Uzbekistan)

10 October 2024 3	Bahrain	2–2	Indonesia	Riffa, Bahrain
19:00 UTC+3	Marhoon 15', 90+9'	Report	Oratmangoen 45+3'; Struick 74'	Stadium: Bahrain National Stadium; Attendance: 10,731; Referee: Ahmed Al-Kaf (Oman)

15 October 2024 4	Saudi Arabia	0–0	Bahrain	Jeddah, Bahrain
21:00 UTC+3		Report		Stadium: King Abdullah Sports City Stadium; Attendance: 35,437; Referee: Salman Ahmad Falahi (Qatar)

14 November 2024 5	Bahrain	v	China	Riffa, Bahrain
17:00 UTC+3		Report		Stadium: Bahrain National Stadium

19 November 2024 6	Bahrain	v	Australia	Riffa, Bahrain
--:-- UTC+3		Report		Stadium: Bahrain National Stadium

20 March 2024 7	Japan	v	Bahrain	Japan
--:-- UTC+9		Report

25 March 2024 8	Indonesia	v	Bahrain	Indonesia
--:--		Report

=== Bahrain national under-23 football team ===
==== Friendlies ====
6 September 2024	United Arab Emirates	2–0	Bahrain	United Arab Emirates
15:45 UTC+4	Al-Maamari 60', 67'	Report

9 September 2024	United Arab Emirates	1–1	Bahrain	United Arab Emirates
15:45 UTC+4	67'	Report	29'

=== Bahrain national under-20 football team ===
==== Friendlies ====
12 September 2024	Thailand	0–0	Bahrain	Thailand
18:00 UTC+7		Report
Note: The match was called off 30 minutes in due to heavy rain. The result was void.

==== AFC U-20 Asian Cup qualification ====
===== Group B =====
Pos	Team	Pld	W	D	L	GF	GA	GD	Pts	Qualification
1	Uzbekistan	4	4	0	0	21	1	+20	12	Final tournament
2	Cambodia	4	2	1	1	6	9	−3	7	
3	Bahrain	4	2	0	2	5	6	−1	6	
4	Nepal	4	1	0	3	4	15	−11	3	
5	Chinese Taipei (H)	4	0	1	3	3	8	−5	1	

Source: AFC
Rules for classification: Qualification tiebreakers
(H) Hosts

21 September 2024 1	Chinese Taipei	0–1	Bahrain	New Taipei City, Taiwan
19:00 UTC+8		Report	Al-Khalaf 80'	Stadium: Fu Jen Catholic University Stadium; Attendance: 450; Referee: Harish Kundu (India)

25 September 2024 2	Bahrain	0–1	Cambodia	New Taipei City, Taiwan
19:00 UTC+8		Report	Mean 68'	Stadium: Fu Jen Catholic University Stadium; Attendance: 96; Referee: Harish Kundu (India)

27 September 2024 3	Bahrain	4–0	Nepal	New Taipei City, Taiwan
15:00 UTC+8	Bassam 27', 73'; Al-Khalaf 45+1'; Hasan 83'	Report		Stadium: Fu Jen Catholic University Stadium; Attendance: 50; Referee: Virendha Rai (Bhutan)

29 September 2024 4	Uzbekistan	5–0	Bahrain	New Taipei City, Taiwan
19:00 UTC+8	Abdullaev 26'; Urinboev 61'; Ibraimov 80', 86'; Tukhsanov 90'	Report		Stadium: Fu Jen Catholic University Stadium; Attendance: 32; Referee: Songkran Bunmeekiart (Thailand)

=== Bahrain national under-19 football team ===
==== WAFF U-19 Championship ====
===== Group C =====
Pos	Team	Pld	W	D	L	GF	GA	GD	Pts	Qualification
1	United Arab Emirates	3	2	0	1	6	2	+4	6	Knockout stage
2	Syria	3	2	0	1	7	6	+1	6	Knockout stage
3	Palestine	3	1	1	1	4	5	−1	4	
4	Bahrain	3	0	1	2	3	7	−4	1	

Source: WAFF
Rules for classification: Group stage tiebreakers

26 June 2024 1	Bahrain	1–3	United Arab Emirates	Taif, Saudi Arabia
17:00 UTC+3	Al-Isa 36'	Report	Al-Mansoori 38', 47'; Bader 45'	Stadium: King Fahd Sports City Stadium

28 June 2024 2	Palestine	1–1	Bahrain	Taif, Saudi Arabia
17:00 UTC+3	S. Ali 31'	Report	S. Awdi 61'	Stadium: King Fahd Sports City Stadium; Referee: Khaled Basaleh (Yemen)

30 June 2024 3	Syria	3–1	Bahrain	Taif, Saudi Arabia
21:00 UTC+3	Dahan 45+3'; Mustafa 54', 83'	Report	Ali 69'	Stadium: Okaz Club Stadium

=== Bahrain national under-17 football team ===
==== AFC U-17 Asian Cup qualification ====
===== Group C =====
Pos	Team	Pld	W	D	L	GF	GA	GD	Pts	Qualification
1	South Korea	4	3	1	0	22	2	+20	10	Final tournament
2	China (H)	4	3	1	0	19	2	+17	10	Final tournament
3	Bahrain	4	2	0	2	2	4	−2	6	
4	Bhutan	4	0	1	3	2	14	−12	1	
5	Maldives	4	0	1	3	2	25	−23	1	

Source: AFC
Rules for classification: Qualification tiebreakers
(H) Hosts

19 October 2024 1	Bahrain	0–2	China	Dalian, China
19:35 UTC+8		Report	Hebibilla 2'; Bian Yulang 60'	Stadium: Puwan Stadium; Attendance: Firdavs Norsafarov (Uzbekistan); Referee: 238

21 October 2024 2	Maldives	0–1	Bahrain	Dalian, China
15:30 UTC+8		Report	Ayash 83'	Stadium: Puwan Stadium; Referee: Suhail Al-Mulla (United Arab Emirates)

25 October 2024 3	Bahrain	0–2	South Korea	Dalian, China
19:35 UTC+8			Lee Su-yoon 36' (pen.); Lee Ji-ho 90'	Stadium: Dalian Football Youth Training Base

27 October 2024 4	Bhutan	0–1	Bahrain	Dalian, China
15:30 UTC+8		Report	Bassam 51' (pen.)	Stadium: Dalian Football Youth Training Base

=== Bahrain national under-16 football team ===
==== WAFF U-16 Championship ====
===== Group C =====
Pos	Team	Pld	W	D	L	GF	GA	GD	Pts	Qualification
1	Palestine	2	1	1	0	4	1	+3	4	Knockout stage
2	Syria	2	1	1	0	3	2	+1	4	Knockout stage
3	Bahrain	2	0	0	2	1	5	−4	0	

Source: WAFF
Rules for classification: Group stage tiebreakers

3 September 2024 1	Palestine	3–0 (awd.)	Bahrain	Zarqa, Jordan
20:00 UTC+3		Report		Stadium: Prince Mohammed Stadium
Note: Bahrain forfeited the match due to fielding Mihran Mohammed Yousef, an ineligible player, along with other penalties.

7 September 2024 2	Bahrain	1–2	Syria	Zarqa, Jordan
20:00 UTC+3	Zuhair 13'	Report	Al-Hassan 70'; Dinawi 90+2'	Stadium: Prince Mohammed Stadium

=== Bahrain women's national football team ===
==== Friendlies ====
1 June 2024	Bahrain	0–1	Palestine	Manama, Bahrain
18:45 UTC+3		Report	Nasr 80'	Stadium: Al Ahli Stadium; Referee: Esraa Al-Mbaiden (Jordan)

4 June 2024	Palestine	2–1	Bahrain	Manama, Bahrain
18:45 UTC+3	Nasr 1'; Al-Kord 62'	Report	Al-Isa 5'	Stadium: Al Ahli Stadium; Referee: Esraa Al-Mbaiden (Jordan)

8 June 2024	Bahrain	2–3	Indonesia	Manama, Bahrain
18:45 UTC+3	Sabkar 63'; Al-Ali 78'	Report	Safira I. 4'; Octavianti D. 26'; Scheunemann 43'	Stadium: Al Ahli Stadium

11 June 2024	Indonesia	3–0	Bahrain	Manama, Bahrain
18:30 UTC+3	Scheunemann 57'; Zahra M. 70'; Citra R. 90+2'			Stadium: Al Ahli Stadium

== Men's football ==
=== AFC Champions League Two ===
==== Qualifying play-offs ====
Team 1	Score	Team 2
Al-Ahli (Bahrain)	0–1	Al-Kuwait

==== Group stage ====
===== Group B =====
Pos	Team	Pld	W	D	L	GF	GA	GD	Pts	Qualification	TAA	KHA	AFC	ALT
1	(Saudi Arabia) Al-Taawoun	6	5	0	1	13	6	+7	15	Advance to round of 16	—	2–1	1–2	2–1
2	(Bahrain) Al-Khaldiya	6	4	0	2	14	7	+7	12	Advance to round of 16	2–3	—	4–1	4–0
3	(Iraq) Al-Quwa Al-Jawiya	6	3	0	3	8	9	−1	9		0–1	1–2	—	2–1
4	(Turkmenistan) Altyn Asyr	6	0	0	6	2	15	−13	0		0–4	0–1	0–2	—

Source: AFC
Rules for classification: Tiebreakers

=== Leagues ===
==== Premier League ====
Pos	Team	Pld	W	D	L	GF	GA	GD	Pts	Qualification or relegation
1	Al-Muharraq (C)	22	16	3	3	54	17	+37	51	Qualification for the AFC Champions League Two group stage (Note: Al-Khaldiya qualified for the AFC Champions League Two Group Stage as the 2024–25 Bahraini King's Cup winners.)
2	Al-Khaldiya	22	14	3	5	41	25	+16	45	Qualification for the AFC Champions League Two group stage
3	Sitra	22	10	8	4	33	21	+12	38	Qualification for the AGCFF Gulf Club Champions League group stage
4	Al-Riffa	22	11	5	6	39	27	+12	38	
5	Al-Shabab	22	7	9	6	23	23	0	30	
6	Al-Ahli	22	8	3	11	32	35	−3	27	
7	Al-Najma	22	7	6	9	29	29	0	27	
8	Malkiya	22	5	10	7	22	28	−6	25	
9	Bahrain SC	22	6	5	11	27	41	−14	23	Qualification for Relegation play-offs
10	A'Ali	22	5	6	11	23	37	−14	21	Qualification for Relegation play-offs
11	East Riffa (R)	22	4	8	10	21	31	−10	20	Relegation to Bahraini Second Division
12	Manama (R)	22	2	8	12	16	46	−30	14	Relegation to Bahraini Second Division

Source: Soccerway
Rules for classification: Points, Head-to-head points, Head-to-head goal difference, Head-to-head goals scored, Total goal difference, Total goals scored
(C) Champions; (R) Relegated

==== Second Division ====
Pos	Team	Pld	W	D	L	GF	GA	GD	Pts	Qualification or relegation
1	Budaiya (C, P)	22	17	4	1	56	16	+40	55	Promotion to Bahraini Premier League
2	Al-Hidd (P)	22	14	6	2	49	19	+30	48	Promotion to Bahraini Premier League
3	Al-Hala (Q)	22	11	8	3	44	18	+26	41	Qualification for Promotion play-offs
4	Isa Town (Q)	22	11	8	3	46	21	+25	41	Qualification for Promotion play-offs
5	Al-Ittihad	22	11	5	6	40	25	+15	38	
6	Umm Al-Hassam	22	11	4	7	32	25	+7	37	
7	Buri	22	7	6	9	21	22	−1	27	
8	Al-Ittifaq Maqaba	22	6	6	10	26	35	−9	24	
9	Busaiteen	22	6	5	11	26	28	−2	23	
10	Etehad Al-Reef	22	3	7	12	20	42	−22	16	
11	Al-Tadamun	22	2	2	18	13	69	−56	8	
12	Qalali	22	0	5	17	17	70	−53	5	

Source: Soccerway
Rules for classification: Points, Goal difference, Goals scored, Head-to-head points, Head-to-head goal difference, Head-to-head goals scored
(C) Champions; (P) Promoted; (Q) Qualified for the phase indicated
