= 2024–25 Bahraini Premier League =

Bahraini Premier League
- Season: 2024–25
- Dates: 22 September 2024 – 27 May 2025
- Champions: Al-Muharraq (35th title)
- Relegated: Manama; East Riffa
- AFC Champions League Two: Al-Muharraq; Al-Khaldiya (as King's Cup winners)
- Matches: 132
- Goals: 362 (2.74 per match)
- Top goalscorer: Juninho (6 goals)
- Biggest home win: Al-Muharraq 7–2 Bahrain SC (20 October 2024)
- Biggest away win: Manama 0–5 Al-Khaldiya (21 September 2024)
- Highest scoring: Al-Muharraq 7–2 Bahrain SC (20 October 2024)
- Longest winning run: 3 matches Al-Khaldiya; Sitra
- Longest unbeaten run: 5 matches Al-Muharraq
- Longest winless run: 4 matches East Riffa; Manama
- Longest losing run: 4 matches East Riffa

The 2024–25 Bahraini Premier League (also known as Nasser Bin Hamad Premier League) is the 68th top-level football season in Bahrain. The season started on 21 September 2024 and will end on a date that is yet to be determined.

== Teams ==
Twelve teams are competing in the league – the top eight teams from the previous season, the top two teams from the relegation play-offs and the two teams directly promoted from the Second Division. The directly promoted teams were Bahrain SC and A'Ali and the team promoted from the relegation play-offs was Malkiya. Bahrain SC and Malkiya returned to the top flight after respective absences of one and three years, whereas A'Ali are making their Premier League debut this season. They replaced Al-Hidd, Al-Hala and Busaiteen, who were relegated to the Second Division after respective spells of three, three and one year in the top flight.

Locations of the 2024–25 Premier League teams

Team	Location	2023–24 Position	Titles	Most recent title
A'Ali	A'ali	2nd (SD)	0	–
Al-Ahli	Manama	4th	5	2009–10
Al-Khaldiya	Hamad Town	1st	2	2023–24
Al-Muharraq	Muharraq	3rd	34	2017–18
Al-Najma	Manama	6th	1	1974–75
Al-Riffa	Riffa	2nd	14	2021–22
Al-Shabab	Manama	7th	0	–
Bahrain SC	Muharraq	1st (SD)	5	1988–89
East Riffa	Riffa	10th 2nd (play-offs)	1	1993–94
Malkiya	Malkiya	3rd (SD); 1st (play-offs)	1	2016–17
Manama	Manama	5th	0	–
Sitra	Sitra	8th	0	–

=== Stadiums and locations ===
Although every match contains a home and away team for administrative purposes (kit colours, fan distribution, etc.), all matches are hosted in one of these three venues.

Stadium	Location	Capacity
Al Muharraq Stadium	Arad	20,000
Bahrain National Stadium	Riffa	24,000
Khalifa Sports City Stadium	Isa Town	15,000

== League table ==
Pos	Team	Pld	W	D	L	GF	GA	GD	Pts	Qualification or relegation
1	Al-Muharraq (C)	22	16	3	3	54	17	+37	51	Qualification for the AFC Champions League Two group stage (Note: Al-Khaldiya qualified for the AFC Champions League Two Group Stage as the 2024–25 Bahraini King's Cup winners.)
2	Al-Khaldiya	22	14	3	5	41	25	+16	45	Qualification for the AFC Champions League Two group stage
3	Sitra	22	10	8	4	33	21	+12	38	Qualification for the AGCFF Gulf Club Champions League group stage
4	Al-Riffa	22	11	5	6	39	27	+12	38	
5	Al-Shabab	22	7	9	6	23	23	0	30	
6	Al-Ahli	22	8	3	11	32	35	−3	27	
7	Al-Najma	22	7	6	9	29	29	0	27	
8	Malkiya	22	5	10	7	22	28	−6	25	
9	Bahrain SC	22	6	5	11	27	41	−14	23	Qualification for Relegation play-offs
10	A'Ali	22	5	6	11	23	37	−14	21	Qualification for Relegation play-offs
11	East Riffa (R)	22	4	8	10	21	31	−10	20	Relegation to Bahraini Second Division
12	Manama (R)	22	2	8	12	16	46	−30	14	Relegation to Bahraini Second Division

Source: Soccerway
Rules for classification: Points, Head-to-head points, Head-to-head goal difference, Head-to-head goals scored, Total goal difference, Total goals scored
(C) Champions; (R) Relegated

== Results ==
Home \ Away	ALI	AHL	KHA	MUH	NAJ	RIF	SHB	BHR	EAS	MAL	MAN	SIT
A'Ali	—	2–0	1–2	0–2	1–3	2–4	1–2	0–2	1–0	2–1	3–0	0–0
Al-Ahli	4–1	—	1–1	2–1	1–0	1–2	1–3	0–1	3–2	4–3	2–0	2–3
Al-Khaldiya	1–0	2–1	—	1–2	2–1	1–0	2–0	3–0	2–1	1–2	3–2	2–0
Al-Muharraq	4–0	3–2	3–1	—	2–0	1–2	3–0	7–2	1–1	3–0	3–0	2–0
Al-Najma	1–2	2–3	1–3	0–0	—	1–3	0–0	2–0	1–1	5–1	1–2	1–1
Al-Riffa	3–0	2–1	2–2	2–0	3–0	—	1–3	4–3	0–1	0–2	5–1	0–2
Al-Shabab	0–0	0–0	1–1	1–2	0–2	2–0	—	0–1	1–1	0–0	1–1	2–2
Bahrain SC	1–1	2–1	1–2	1–3	1–2	0–2	1–2	—	2–1	2–2	3–1	2–2
East Riffa	1–1	1–0	3–2	0–3	2–4	0–0	0–2	3–1	—	1–2	1–1	0–2
Malkiya	2–2	1–1	2–1	1–1	0–1	2–2	0–0	0–0	0–0	—	0–0	0–1
Manama	2–2	0–1	0–5	1–6	1–1	0–0	0–2	1–1	1–0	0–1	—	0–3
Sitra	2–1	3–1	2–0	0–2	0–0	1–1	1–1	2–0	1–1	0–1	4–1	—

Source: Soccerway
Legend: Blue = home team win; Yellow = draw; Red = away team win.

== Results by round ==
Team ╲ Round	1	2	3	4	5	6	7	8	9	10	11	12	13	14	15	16	17	18	19	20	21	22
A'Ali	L	L	D	W	L																	
Al-Ahli	L	W	L																			
Al-Khaldiya	W	W	W	L																		
Al-Muharraq	W	D	W	D	W																	
Al-Najma	L	L	W	D																		
Al-Riffa	W	L	D	W																		
Al-Shabab	L	W	D	W																		
Bahrain SC	W	W	L	L																		
East Riffa	L	L	L	L																		
Malkiya	W	D	D	L																		
Manama	L	L	D	D																		
Sitra	W	W	W																			

Updated to match(es) played on 23 November 2024. Source: Soccerway
W = Win; D = Draw; L = Lose

== Positions by round ==
The table lists the positions of teams after each week of matches.

Team ╲ Round	1	2	3	4	5	6	7	8	9	10	11	12	13	14	15	16	17	18	19	20	21	22
Al-Khaldiya	1	1	2	1																		
Sitra	5	2	3	2																		
Al-Muharraq	2	4	1	3																		
Al-Shabab	11	8	6	4																		
Bahrain SC	6	3	4	5																		
Malkiya	4	5	5	6																		
Al-Riffa	3	6	7	7																		
A'Ali	7	9	10	8																		
Al-Najma	10	11	9	9																		
Al-Ahli	9	7	8	10																		
Manama	12	12	11	11																		
East Riffa	8	10	12	12																		

Leader and qualification for the AFC Champions League Two group stage
Relegation play-offs
Relegation to Bahraini Second Division

Updated to match(es) played on 23 November 2024. Source: Soccerway

== Relegation play-offs ==
In this edition of the relegation play-offs, the ninth and tenth-placed teams of the Bahraini Premier League will be joined by the third and fourth-placed teams of the 2024–25 Bahraini Second Division in a four-team group where each team will play each other once. The top two teams of the group will qualify for the 2025–26 edition of the Bahraini Premier League and the bottom two teams will qualify for the 2025–26 edition of the Bahraini Second Division. The relegation play-offs will start on a date yet to be determined, sometime after the end of the regular season.

=== Table ===
Pos	Team	Pld	W	D	L	GF	GA	GD	Pts	Qualification or relegation
1	Bahrain SC	3	2	1	0	4	2	+2	7	Promotion to Bahraini Premier League
2	Al-Hala	3	1	1	1	6	4	+2	4	Promotion to Bahraini Premier League
3	A'Ali	3	1	1	1	2	2	0	4	Relegation to Bahraini Second Division
4	Isa Town	3	0	1	2	2	6	−4	1	Relegation to Bahraini Second Division

Updated to match(es) played on 10 June 2025. Source:

=== Results ===
Home \ Away	BFC	AAL	ASC	ISA
Bahrain SC			1–1	2–1
A'Ali SC	0–1			0–0
Al-Hala SC		1–2		
Isa Town FC			1–4	

First match(es) will be played: May 2025. Source:
Legend: Blue = home team win; Yellow = draw; Red = away team win.

== Season statistics ==
=== Top scorers ===
Rank	Player	Club	Goals
1	(Brazil) Juninho	Al-Muharraq	6
2	(Brazil) Vinícius Vargas	Al-Riffa	4
3	(Brazil) Maurício	A'Ali	3
3	(Bahrain) Issa Abd Al-Wahab	Malkiya	2
3	(Bahrain) Mahdi Abduljabbar	Al-Khaldiya	2
3	(Bahrain) Husain Abdulkarim	Al-Muharraq	2
3	(Nigeria) Imran Adam	Sitra	2
3	(Bahrain) Sayed Ibrahim Alawi	Al-Shabab	2
3	(Bahrain) Ebrahim Al-Khattal	Manama	2
3	(Bahrain) Abdulwahab Al-Malood	Al-Muharraq	2
3	(Syria) Mohammad Al Marmour	Al-Najma	2
3	(Bahrain) Mohamed Al-Romaihi	Al-Najma	2
3	(Bahrain) Ahmed Al-Sherooqi	Al-Muharraq	2
3	(Brazil) Anderson Júnior	Bahrain SC	2
3	(Algeria) Samy Frioui	Al-Riffa SC	2
3	(Brazil) Gleison	Al-Khaldiya	2
3	(Chad) Ousmane Hissein Hassan	Sitra	2
3	(Brazil) Igor Torres	Al-Khaldiya	2
3	(Brazil) Joel	Sitra	2
3	(Brazil) Luiz Fernando	East Riffa	2
3	(Argentina) Facundo Tobares	Al-Ahli	2
3	(Brazil) Gabriel Vasconcelos	Bahrain SC	2
