= Sayed Dhiya Saeed =

Bahraini footballer

Sayed Saeed
Personal information
- Full name: Sayed Dhiya Saeed Ebrahim Alawi Shubbar
- Date of birth: 17 July 1992 (age 34)
- Place of birth: Muharraq, Bahrain
- Height: 1.75 m (5 ft 9 in)
- Position: Defensive midfielder

Team information
- Current team: Al-Khaldiya
- Number: 2

Youth career
- 2008–2010: Al-Muharraq

Senior career*
Years	Team	Apps	(Gls)
2008–2014	Al-Muharraq	45	(0)
2014–2018	Al-Riffa	12	(1)
2018–2021	Al Naser	62	(19)
2021–	Al-Khaldiya	51	(1)
2022–2023	→ Al-Shabab (loan)	18	(1)
2025–2026	→ Al-Salmiya (loan)	12	(0)

International career^{‡}
2011–	Bahrain	138	(8)
Medal record
Men's football
Representing Bahrain
Gulf Cup
Winner	2024 Kuwait
- * Club domestic league appearances and goals as of 15:44, 4 May 2026 (UTC) ‡ National team caps and goals as of 3 May 2026

Sayed Dhiya Saeed Ebrahim Alawi Shubbar (Arabic: سيد ضياء سيد سعيد; born 17 July 1992) is a Bahraini professional footballer who plays as a defensive midfielder for Bahraini Premier League club Al-Khaldiya and captains the Bahrain national team. He normally plays as a defensive midfielder, but he can also play in attack as he did at Al Naser.

== Career statistics ==
=== Club ===
Only league statistics are shown.

Appearances and goals by club, season and competition
Club	Season	League		
Club	Season	Division	Apps	Goals
Al-Muharraq	2008–09	Bahraini Premier League	0	0
Al-Muharraq	2009–10	Bahraini Premier League	0	0
Al-Muharraq	2010–11	Bahraini Premier League	10	0
Al-Muharraq	2011–12	Bahraini Premier League	12	0
Al-Muharraq	2012–13	Bahraini Premier League	11	0
Al-Muharraq	2013–14	Bahraini Premier League	12	0
Al-Muharraq	Total		45	0
Al-Riffa	2014–15	Bahraini Premier League	6	0
Al-Riffa	2015–16	Bahraini Premier League	1	1
Al-Riffa	2016–17	Bahraini Premier League	0	0
Al-Riffa	2017–18	Bahraini Premier League	5	0
Al-Riffa	Total		12	1
Al Naser	2017–18	Kuwait Premier League	20	9
Al Naser	2018–19	Kuwait Premier League	16	5
Al Naser	2019–20	Kuwait Premier League	14	3
Al Naser	2020–21	Kuwait Premier League	12	2
Al Naser	Total		62	19
Al-Khaldiya	2021–22	Bahraini Premier League	16	1
Al-Khaldiya	2022–23	Bahraini Premier League	0	0
Al-Khaldiya	2023–24	Bahraini Premier League	22	0
Al-Khaldiya	2024–25	Bahraini Premier League	13	0
Al-Khaldiya	2025–26	Bahraini Premier League	0	0
Al-Shabab (loan)	2022–23	Bahraini Premier League	18	1
Al-Salmiya (loan)	2025–26	Kuwait Premier League	12	0
Al-Salmiya (loan)	Total		81	2
Career total			200	22

=== International ===
As of match played 9 December 2025

Appearances and goals by national team and year
National team	Year	Apps	Goals
Bahrain	2011	8	1
Bahrain	2012	12	3
Bahrain	2013	12	0
Bahrain	2014	9	0
Bahrain	2015	13	1
Bahrain	2016	5	0
Bahrain	2017	13	0
Bahrain	2018	6	0
Bahrain	2019	14	0
Bahrain	2020	0	0
Bahrain	2021	12	2
Bahrain	2022	6	0
Bahrain	2023	6	1
Bahrain	2024	9	0
Bahrain	2025	13	0
Bahrain	2026	0	0
Total		138	8

Scores and results list Bahrain's goal tally first.

Goal	Date	Venue	Opponent	Score	Result	Competition
1.	6 September 2011	Gelora Bung Karno Stadium, Jakarta, Indonesia	Indonesia	1–0	2–0	2014 FIFA World Cup qualification
2.	29 February 2012	Bahrain National Stadium, Riffa, Bahrain	Indonesia	6–0	10–0	2014 FIFA World Cup qualification
3.	29 February 2012	Bahrain National Stadium, Riffa, Bahrain	Indonesia	9–0	10–0	2014 FIFA World Cup qualification
4.	29 February 2012	Bahrain National Stadium, Riffa, Bahrain	Indonesia	10–0	10–0	2014 FIFA World Cup qualification
5.	19 January 2015	Stadium Australia, Sydney, Australia	Qatar	1–0	2–1	2015 AFC Asian Cup
6.	23 May 2021	Metalist Oblast Sports Complex, Kharkiv, Ukraine	Ukraine	1–0	1–1	Friendly
7.	15 June 2021	Bahrain National Stadium, Riffa, Bahrain	Hong Kong	1–0	4–0	2022 FIFA World Cup qualification
8.	25 March 2023	Al Muharraq Stadium, Arad, Bahrain	Palestine	1–2	1–2	Friendly
