= 2024–25 Bahraini Second Division =

Bahraini Second Division
- Season: 2024–25
- Matches: 42
- Goals: 80 (1.9 per match)
- Biggest home win: Al-Hidd 5–0 Etehad Al-Reef (21 November 2024)
- Biggest away win: Qalali 1–9 Isa Town (8 November 2024)
- Highest scoring: Qalali 1–9 Isa Town (8 November 2024)
- Longest winning run: 4 matches Al-Ittihad
- Longest unbeaten run: 7 matches Al-Hala; Budaiya
- Longest winless run: 7 matches Al-Tadamun; Etehad Al-Reef; Qalali
- Longest losing run: 7 matches Al-Tadamun
- All statistics correct as of 22 November 2024.

The 2024–25 Bahraini Second Division is the 22nd edition of the second and lowest level football league in Bahrain. The season started on 19 September 2024 and will end on a date that is yet to be determined.

== Teams ==
Twelve teams are competing in the league – the bottom eight teams from the previous season, the bottom two teams from the promotion play-offs and the two teams directly relegated from the Premier League. The directly relegated teams were Al-Hala and Busaiteen and the team relegated from the relegation play-offs was Al-Hidd, who all returned to the second tier after respective absences of four, one and fifteen years. They replaced Bahrain SC, A'Ali and Malkiya, who were promoted to the Premier League after respective spells of one, two and three years in the second tier.

Locations of the 2024–25 Second Division teams

Team	Location	2023–24 Position	Titles	Most recent title
Al-Hala	Muharraq	11th (PL)	2	2020–21
Al-Hidd	Al Hidd	9th (PL); 3rd (play-offs)	3	2009–10
Al-Ittifaq Maqaba	Hamad Town	6th	0	–
Al-Ittihad	Manama	4th 4th (play-offs)	0	–
Al-Tadamun	Buri	12th	0	–
Budaiya	Budaiya	5th	1	2017–18
Buri	Buri	8th	0	–
Busaiteen	Busaiteen	12th (PL)	0	–
Etehad Al-Reef	Shahrakan	11th	0	–
Isa Town	Isa Town	7th	0	–
Qalali	Manama	10th	0	–
Umm Al-Hassam	Manama	9th	0	–

=== Stadiums and locations ===
Although every match contains a home and away team for administrative purposes (kit colours, fan distribution, etc.), all matches are hosted in one of these four venues.

Stadium	Location	Capacity
Al-Ahli Stadium	Manama	10,000
Al Najma Club Stadium	Manama	2,000
Al Riffa Sports Club Stadium	Riffa	9,000
Madinet Hamad Stadium	Hamad Town	2,000

== League table ==
Pos	Team	Pld	W	D	L	GF	GA	GD	Pts	Qualification or relegation
1	Budaiya (C, P)	22	17	4	1	56	16	+40	55	Promotion to Bahraini Premier League
2	Al-Hidd (P)	22	14	6	2	49	19	+30	48	Promotion to Bahraini Premier League
3	Al-Hala (Q)	22	11	8	3	44	18	+26	41	Qualification for Promotion play-offs
4	Isa Town (Q)	22	11	8	3	46	21	+25	41	Qualification for Promotion play-offs
5	Al-Ittihad	22	11	5	6	40	25	+15	38	
6	Umm Al-Hassam	22	11	4	7	32	25	+7	37	
7	Buri	22	7	6	9	21	22	−1	27	
8	Al-Ittifaq Maqaba	22	6	6	10	26	35	−9	24	
9	Busaiteen	22	6	5	11	26	28	−2	23	
10	Etehad Al-Reef	22	3	7	12	20	42	−22	16	
11	Al-Tadamun	22	2	2	18	13	69	−56	8	
12	Qalali	22	0	5	17	17	70	−53	5	

Source: Soccerway
Rules for classification: Points, Goal difference, Goals scored, Head-to-head points, Head-to-head goal difference, Head-to-head goals scored
(C) Champions; (P) Promoted; (Q) Qualified for the phase indicated

== Results ==
Home \ Away	HAL	HID	ITM	ITT	TMN	BUD	BUR	BUS	REF	ISA	QAL	HSM
Al-Hala	—	1–1	3–0	3–2	9–0	0–1	2–0	1–1	1–1	0–0	3–0	3–1
Al-Hidd	0–1	—	1–1	1–2	4–0	2–1	1–0	4–0	5–0	2–2	4–2	0–0
Al-Ittifaq Maqaba	0–0	1–2	—	2–4	4–0	2–3	2–2	1–0	2–1	0–2	2–1	0–3
Al-Ittihad	0–0	0–2	0–0	—	6–0	2–2	2–1	2–1	2–1	1–2	2–1	0–1
Al-Tadamun	0–2	2–3	0–1	1–5	—	1–6	0–0	0–2	0–1	0–4	2–0	2–3
Budaiya	2–1	1–1	2–1	3–1	8–0	—	2–1	1–0	3–0	1–1	4–0	3–1
Buri	1–1	2–3	1–2	1–0	3–0	0–0	—	0–2	1–0	1–0	2–0	1–0
Busaiteen	1–2	1–3	1–0	1–2	2–0	0–1	1–3	—	3–0	2–2	1–1	1–2
Etehad Al-Reef	0–4	0–3	1–1	0–0	3–3	0–1	0–0	2–1	—	0–3	1–1	0–2
Isa Town	3–2	2–2	3–0	0–1	1–0	1–3	1–0	0–0	3–3	—	4–0	2–1
Qalali	3–3	0–3	3–3	0–4	1–2	1–5	1–1	0–4	1–5	1–9	—	0–4
Umm Al-Hassam	1–2	0–2	2–1	2–2	1–0	0–3	2–0	1–1	2–1	1–1	2–0	—

Source: Soccerway
Legend: Blue = home team win; Yellow = draw; Red = away team win.

=== Results by round ===
Team ╲ Round	1	2	3	4	5	6	7	8	9	10	11	12	13	14	15	16	17	18	19	20	21	22
Al-Hala	W	W	W	D	D	W	W															
Al-Hidd	W	W	L	D	W	W	W															
Al-Ittifaq Maqaba	D	L	L	D	D	W	L															
Al-Ittihad	W	W	W	W	D	L	W															
Al-Tadamun	L	L	L	L	L	L	L															
Budaiya	W	W	W	D	W	W	D															
Buri	L	W	L	D	W	L	D															
Busaiteen	L	W	W	W	D	L	D															
Etehad Al-Reef	L	L	D	L	D	L	L															
Isa Town	L	L	W	D	L	W	D															
Qalali	D	L	D	L	L	L	L															
Umm Al-Hassam	W	L	L	W	D	W	W															

Updated to match(es) played on 22 November 2024. Source: Soccerway
W = Win; D = Draw; L = Lose

=== Positions by round ===
The table lists the positions of teams after each week of matches.

Team ╲ Round	1	2	3	4	5	6	7	8	9	10	11	12	13	14	15	16	17	18	19	20	21	22
Budaiya	4	2	2	3	1	1	1															
Al-Hala	1	1	1	2	3	2	2															
Al-Hidd	2	4	5	5	5	4	3															
Al-Ittihad	3	3	3	1	2	3	4															
Umm Al-Hassam	5	7	8	6	7	6	5															
Busaiteen	10	5	4	4	4	5	6															
Isa Town	11	11	7	8	8	7	7															
Buri	9	6	6	7	6	8	8															
Al-Ittifaq Maqaba	6	8	10	9	9	9	9															
Etehad Al-Reef	12	12	11	11	11	10	10															
Qalali	7	9	9	10	10	11	11															
Al-Tadamun	8	10	12	12	12	12	12															

Leader and promotion to Premier League
Promotion to Premier League
Qualification to Promotion play-offs

Updated to match(es) played on 22 November 2024. Source: Soccerway

== Promotion play-offs ==
In this edition of the promotion play-offs, the ninth and tenth-placed teams of the 2024–25 Bahraini Premier League will be joined by the third and fourth-placed teams of the Bahraini Second Division in a four-team group where each team will play each other once. The top two teams of the group will qualify for the 2025–26 edition of the Bahraini Premier League and the bottom two teams will qualify for the 2025–26 edition of the Bahraini Second Division. The promotion play-offs will start on a date yet to be determined, sometime after the end of the regular season.

=== Table ===
Pos	Team	Pld	W	D	L	GF	GA	GD	Pts	Qualification or relegation
1	Bahrain SC	3	2	1	0	4	2	+2	7	Promotion to Bahraini Premier League
2	Al-Hala	3	1	1	1	6	4	+2	4	Promotion to Bahraini Premier League
3	A'Ali	3	1	1	1	2	2	0	4	Relegation to Bahraini Second Division
4	Isa Town	3	0	1	2	2	6	−4	1	Relegation to Bahraini Second Division

Updated to match(es) played on 10 June 2025. Source:

=== Results ===
Home \ Away	BFC	AAL	ASC	ISA
Bahrain SC			1–1	2–1
A'Ali SC	0–1			0–0
Al-Hala SC		1–2		
Isa Town FC			1–4	

First match(es) will be played: May 2025. Source:
Legend: Blue = home team win; Yellow = draw; Red = away team win.
