= List of football clubs in Bahrain =

This is a list of football (soccer) clubs in Bahrain.

- Al-Ahli (Manama)
- Al Hadd Club
- Al Hala Club
- Al Ittifaq (Maqaba)
- Al-Ittihad Club (Bahrain)
- Al Kerlawi FC (Bahrain)
- Al-Khaldiya
- Nexus Fc (Manama)
- Al Najma Club
- Al-Shabab Club
- Al Tadamun Buri
- Al Zad F.C
- Bahrain Club
- Bahrain Riffa Club
- Budaiya Club
- Busaiteen Club
- East Riffa Club
- Isa Town
- ISF FC (Bahrain)
- Malkiya Club
- Manama Club
- Muharraq Club
- Qalali Club
- Aradous CF
- Sitra Club
- Yuva Kerala FC
