= 2025–26 Bahraini Premier League =

Bahraini Premier League
- Season: 2025–26
- Dates: 11 September 2025 – 16 May 2026
- Champions: Al-Muharraq SC
- Relegated: Bahrain SC
- Champions League Two: Al-Khaldiya; Al-Muharraq
- Matches: 132
- Goals: 333 (2.52 per match)
- Top goalscorer: Joel Beya (13)
- Biggest home win: Al-Muharraq 7–0 Bahrain SC (20 February 2026)
- Biggest away win: Bahrain SC 0–4 Malkiya (3 May 2026)
- Highest scoring: Al-Muharraq 7–0 Bahrain SC (20 February 2026)
- All statistics correct as of 15 May 2026.

The 2025–26 Bahraini Premier League (also known as Nasser Bin Hamad Premier League) is the 69th top-level football season in Bahrain. The season began on 11 September 2025 and is scheduled to conclude in May 2026. Al-Muharraq are the defending champions, having won their 35th title in the previous season.

== Teams ==
Twelve teams are competing in the league – the top eight teams from the previous season, the top two teams from the relegation play-offs, and the two teams directly promoted from the Second Division. The directly promoted teams were Al-Hidd and Budaiya, who secured their return to the top flight after a one-year absence. They replaced Manama and East Riffa, who were relegated to the Second Division for the first time in over a decade.

Locations of the 2025–26 Premier League teams

Team	Location	2024–25 Position	Titles	Most recent title
A'Ali	A'ali	8th	0	–
Al-Ahli	Manama	4th	5	2009–10
Al-Hala	Muharraq	3rd (SD); 1st (play-offs)	1	1978–79
Al-Hidd	Hidd	1st (SD)	2	2015–16
Al-Khaldiya	Hamad Town	2nd	2	2023–24
Al-Muharraq	Muharraq	1st	35	2024–25
Al-Najma	Manama	6th	1	1974–75
Al-Riffa	Riffa	3rd	14	2021–22
Al-Shabab	Manama	7th	0	–
Bahrain SC	Muharraq	9th	5	1988–89
Budaiya	Budaiya	2nd (SD)	0	–
Malkiya	Malkiya	10th 2nd (play-offs)	1	2016–17
Sitra	Sitra	5th	0	–

=== Stadiums and locations ===
Although every match contains a home and away team for administrative purposes (kit colours, fan distribution, etc.), the majority of matches are hosted in one of these centralized venues.

Stadium	Location	Capacity
Bahrain National Stadium	Riffa	24,000
Khalifa Sports City Stadium	Isa Town	15,000
Al Ahli Stadium	Manama	2,500
Al Muharraq Stadium	Arad	10,000

== League table ==
Pos	Team	Pld	W	D	L	GF	GA	GD	Pts	Qualification or relegation
1	Al-Muharraq (C)	22	17	4	1	45	7	+38	55	Qualification for the AFC Champions League Two group stage
2	Al-Khaldiya	22	18	0	4	42	16	+26	54	Qualification for the AFC Champions League Two group stage
3	Al-Riffa	22	15	4	3	41	17	+24	49	Qualification for the AGCFF Gulf Club Champions League group stage
4	Malkiya	22	9	6	7	23	16	+7	33	
5	A'Ali	22	9	4	9	19	20	−1	31	
6	Al-Hidd	22	8	6	8	29	23	+6	30	
7	Al-Ahli	22	7	6	9	28	28	0	27	
8	Sitra	22	7	6	9	22	31	−9	27	
9	Budaiya	22	6	4	12	24	34	−10	22	Qualification for Relegation play-offs
10	Al-Najma	22	6	4	12	21	35	−14	22	Qualification for Relegation play-offs
11	Al-Shabab (R)	22	3	5	14	8	34	−26	14	Relegation to Bahraini Second Division
12	Bahrain SC (R)	22	2	1	19	15	56	−41	7	Relegation to Bahraini Second Division

Updated to match(es) played on 15 May 2026. Source: Flashscore
Rules for classification: 1) Points, 2) Head-to-head points,3) Head-to-head goal difference, 4) Head-to-head goals scored, 5) Total goal difference, 6) Total goals scored
(C) Champions; (R) Relegated

=== Results ===
Home \ Away	ALI	AHL	HID	KHA	MUH	NAJ	RIF	SHB	BAH	BUD	MAL	SIT
A'Ali	—	1–1	2–1	0–3	1–1	2–0	1–4	0–1	2–1	2–0	0–1	0–2
Al-Ahli	1–2	—	0–1	0–1	0–1	1–0	2–3	2–0	3–0	2–3	0–0	1–2
Al-Hidd	0–1	3–3	—	1–2	0–1	3–1	0–0	1–0	1–1	1–2	2–2	4–1
Al-Khaldiya	1–0	0–1	2–1	—	1–2	3–0	2–1	0–1	4–0	3–1	1–3	2–1
Al-Muharraq	1–0	3–0	3–0	0–1	—	2–0	1–1	3–0	7–0	1–0	1–1	3–0
Al-Najma	0–3	2–4	1–0	1–3	1–3	—	1–2	2–0	2–1	1–2	1–0	2–0
Al-Riffa	1–0	2–0	0–3	0–2	1–1	1–1	—	4–0	3–2	3–0	2–0	3–0
Al-Shabab	0–0	0–0	0–2	0–1	0–3	1–1	0–1	—	1–0	1–3	0–1	1–3
Bahrain SC	1–0	1–2	1–3	1–4	0–2	0–3	0–1	4–0	—	0–3	0–4	0–1
Budaiya	0–1	2–2	0–2	0–1	0–1	1–1	0–3	1–1	4–1	—	0–1	1–1
Malkiya	0–1	1–1	0–0	1–2	0–1	3–0	0–2	1–0	2–0	2–1	—	0–0
Sitra	0–0	0–2	0–0	1–3	0–4	0–0	1–3	1–1	4–1	3–0	1–0	—

Updated to match(es) played on 16 May 2026. Source: Soccerway
Legend: Blue = home team win; Yellow = draw; Red = away team win.

=== Results by round ===
Team ╲ Round	1	2	3	4	5	6	7	8	9	10	11	12	13	14	15	16	17	18	19	20	21	22
A'Ali	L	W	D	D	L	L	L	D	W	W	D	L	W	W	L							
Al-Ahli	L	L	D	W	W	D	W	L	L	D	L	L	W	L	W							
Al-Hidd	D	W	D	D	W	L	L	L	L	D	W	D	D	W	W							
Al-Khaldiya	W	W	L	L	W	W	W	W	W	W	W	W	L	W	W							
Al-Muharraq	W	W	D	W	D	W	W	W	W	L	D	W	W	W	W							
Al-Najma	D	L	D	L	L	W	D	W	L	W	L	L	L	W	L							
Al-Riffa	D	W	D	W	D	L	W	W	W	W	W	W	W	L	W							
Al-Shabab	D	L	W	D	L	L	L	L	L	D	L	L	L	L	W							
Bahrain SC	L	L	L	L	L	W	L	W	L	L	L	L	D	L	L							
Budaiya	D	L	W	L	D	W	D	L	L	L	W	W	L	W	L							
Malkiya	D	W	D	W	W	D	W	L	W	L	D	D	W	L	L							
Sitra	W	L	D	D	D	L	L	D	W	D	D	W	L	L	L							

Updated to match(es) played on 23 February 2026. Source: Soccerway
W = Win; D = Draw; L = Loss

=== Positions by round ===
The table lists the positions of teams after each week of matches.

Team ╲ Round	1	2	3	4	5	6	7	8	9	10	11	12	13	14	15	16	17	18	19	20	21	22
Al-Muharraq	2	1	1	1	1	1	1	1	1	2	2	2	2	2	1							
Al-Khaldiya	3	2	2	5	5	2	2	2	2	1	1	1	1	1	2							
Al-Riffa	6	3	3	2	3	4	4	3	3	3	3	3	3	3	3							
Sitra	1	7	8	7	7	8	9	9	6	8	9	6	8	9	10							
Al-Ahli	12	11	11	10	6	7	5	5	5	5	7	9	6	10	7							
Al-Shabab	6	9	9	8	10	11	11	12	12	11	11	12	12	12	11							
Al-Najma	6	9	10	11	11	10	8	8	10	7	10	10	10	8	9							
Malkiya	4	5	5	3	2	3	3	4	4	4	4	4	4	4	4							
Bahrain SC	11	12	12	12	12	12	12	11	11	12	12	11	11	11	12							
A'Ali	10	6	7	6	8	9	10	10	8	6	6	8	5	5	6							
Al-Hidd	4	4	4	4	4	5	7	6	7	9	5	7	9	6	5							
Budaiya	6	8	6	9	9	6	6	6	9	10	8	5	7	7	8							

Leader and qualification for the AFC Champions League Two group stage
Qualification for the AFC Champions League Two preliminary stage
Qualification for the AGCFF Gulf Club Champions League group stage
Relegation play-offs
Relegation to Bahraini Second Division

Updated to match(es) played on 23 February 2026. Source: Soccerway
