= 2020–21 Bahraini Premier League =

Bahrain Premier League
- Season: 2020–21
- Champions: Al-Riffa (13th title)
- Relegated: Malkiya; Busaiteen
- AFC Cup: Al-Riffa; East Riffa
- Matches: 92
- Goals: 215 (2.34 per match)
- Top goalscorer: Mahdi Abduljabbar (12 goals)
- Biggest home win: Busaiteen 6–1 Malkiya (14 December 2020)
- Biggest away win: Al-Najma SC 1–5 Manama (8 March 2021)
- Highest scoring: Busaiteen 6–1 Malkiya (14 December 2020); Al-Ahli 2–5 Manama (5 February 2021); Al-Hidd 4–3 East Riffa (3 March 2021)

The 2020–21 Bahraini Premier League (also known as Nasser Bin Hamad Premier League) was the 64th top-level football season in Bahrain. The season started on 8 December 2020, and ended on 26 May 2021.

== Team location ==
Location football club of Bahraini Premier League

== Foreign players ==
Club	Player 1	Player 2	Player 3	Player 4	Player 5	AFC Player	Former Players
Al-Ahli	(Brazil) Alexandre Hans	(Lebanon) Jad Noureddine	(Netherlands) Tarik Kada			(Qatar) Hamza Sanhaji	(Tunisia) Zied Ziadi
Al-Ahli	(Brazil) Bruno Nascimento	(Brazil) Erick Luis	(Brazil) Paulo Victor	(Egypt) Mohamed Shawer	(Saudi Arabia) Nasser Al-Shamrani	(Syria) Mohamad Fares	
Al-Muharraq	(Brazil) Everton	(Brazil) Jhonnattann	(Brazil) Tiago Real	(Nigeria) Prince Aggreh	(Syria) Abdalrahman Barakat	(Syria) Fares Arnaout	(Brazil) Bruno Ritter (Turkmenistan) Ruslan Mingazow
Al-Najma	(Brazil) Caculé	(Brazil) Ceará	(Brazil) Luis Junior	(Libya) Mahdi El Houni	(Senegal) Mamadou Dramé		
Al-Riffa	(Brazil) Vitor Gabriel	(Tunisia) Maher Boulabiar					(Libya) Saleh Al-Taher
Budaiya	(Brazil) Aílton	(Brazil) Élton				(Lebanon) Yahya El Hindi	
Busaiteen	(Brazil) Marcus Vinicius	(France) Jean-Michel Joachim	(Gabon) Samson Mbingui	(Niger) Soune Soungole		(Palestine) Yaser Hamed	(Brazil) Júnior Timbó
East Riffa	(Brazil) Felipe Hereda	(Brazil) Luiz Fernando	(Brazil) Yuri	(Poland) Łukasz Gikiewicz		(Jordan) Saeed Murjan	(Yemen) Ali Nasser
Malkiya	(Sweden) Lukman Murad					(Syria) Nawaf Abdullah	
Manama	(Cameroon) Hervé Elame	(Ivory Coast) Aubin Kouakou	(Togo) Adewale Olufade			(Syria) Israa Hamwiah	

== League table ==
Pos	Team	Pld	W	D	L	GF	GA	GD	Pts	Qualification or relegation
1	Al-Riffa (C)	18	14	3	1	31	13	+18	45	Qualification for AFC Cup group stage
2	East Riffa	18	11	2	5	32	20	+12	35	Qualification for AFC Cup group stage
3	Manama	18	9	4	5	26	18	+8	31	
4	Al-Muharraq	18	7	6	5	24	15	+9	27	
5	Al-Hidd	18	8	3	7	26	23	+3	27	
6	Al-Ahli	18	5	6	7	17	25	−8	21	
7	Budaiya	18	3	8	7	11	19	−8	17	
8	Al-Najma SC (O)	18	3	6	9	17	31	−14	15	Qualification for Relegation play-offs
9	Malkiya (R)	18	2	7	9	11	26	−15	13	Relegation to Bahraini Second Division
10	Busaiteen (R)	18	1	9	8	17	22	−5	12	Relegation to Bahraini Second Division

Source: Soccerway
(C) Champions; (O) Play-off winners; (R) Relegated

== Results ==
Home \ Away	AHL	HID	MUH	NAJ	RIF	BUD	BUS	EAS	MAL	MAN	AHL	HID	MUH	NAJ	RIF	BUD	BUS	EAS	MAL	MAN
Al-Ahli		1–1	1–0	3–1	1–3	1–1	0–0			2–5					2–2		1–0			
Al-Hidd	2–0		1–0	1–1	0–2	2–1	1–0	4–3						4–1		3–0	3–2			
Al-Muharraq	3–1	2–0				0–0		0–1	2–0	1–2								1–0	1–1	3–1
Al-Najma SC	0–1		2–1		1–2		1–0	0–1		1–5			2–2		0–2					
Al-Riffa		1–0	0–0					2–0	1–0	2–1			1–3						2–1	2–1
Budaiya	1–0		0–3	1–0	0–2		1–1	0–1						1–1	0–2		1–1			
Busaiteen			1–1	2–2	1–2			1–2	6–1	0–0			1–1		1–1					
East Riffa	3–0	3–1		1–1	1–2	1–4	3–0		3–0	1–1	2–0									
Malkiya	1–1	2–1		1–1		0–0	0–0	2–4			0–0	1–0		1–2		0–0				
Manama	0–2	2–2		2–0		1–0	1–0	1–2	1–0			1–0				0–0			1–0	

Source: Soccerway
Legend: Blue = home team win; Yellow = draw; Red = away team win.
For upcoming matches, an "a" indicates there is an article about the rivalry between the two participants.

== Relegation play-off ==
=== 1st leg ===
22 May 2021
19:15

Al-Najma SC	1–0	Al Ittifaq Maqaba
Jalilo 71' (o.g.)	Report

Madinat 'Isa Stadium, Isa Town

=== 2nd leg ===
26 May 2021
19:15

Al Ittifaq Maqaba	0–2	Al-Najma SC
	Report	Nemer 3' (pen.); Muneer 8'

Madinat 'Isa Stadium, Isa Town

Al-Najma SC wins 3–0 on aggregate. Both teams stay in their current leagues respectively.

== Season statistics ==
=== Top scorers ===
Rank	Player	Club	Goals
1	(Bahrain) Mahdi Abduljabbar	Manama	12
2	(Bahrain) Mohamed Al-Romaihi	East Riffa	11
3	(Bahrain) Mahdi Al-Humaidan	Al-Riffa	9
4	(Bahrain) Ali Madan	Al-Riffa	6
4	(Syria) Abdalrahman Barakat	Al-Muharraq	6
4	(Syria) Mohammad Fares	Al-Hidd	6
4	(Poland) Łukasz Gikiewicz	East Riffa	6
4	(Bahrain) Ismail Abdullatif	Al-Muharraq	6
9	(Bahrain) Issa Abd Al Wahab	Malkiya	5
9	(Brazil) Luis Junior	Al-Najma SC	5
9	(Bahrain) Issa Moosa Naji	Manama	5
9	(Brazil) Erick Luis	Hidd SCC	5
