= 2023–24 Bahraini Super Cup =

2023-24 Bahraini Super Cup
- Event: Bahraini Super Cup
Al-Khaldiya	Al-Hala
2	0
- Date: 13 September 2024
- Venue: Khalifa Sports City Stadium, Isa Town

The 2023 Bahraini Super Cup was the 17th season of the Bahraini Super Cup, an annual Bahraini football match played between the winners of the previous season's Bahraini Premier League and Bahraini King's Cup. The match was contested by 2022–23 League champions Al-Khaldiya, and the 2022–23 Domestic Cup champions Al-Hala. It took place on 13 September 2024.

The defending champions, Al-Khaldiya defeated Al-Hala, 2–0, to win their second title.

== Match ==
=== Details ===
13 September 2024
19:00

Al-Khaldiya	2–0	Al-Hala
Abduljabbar 70'; Al-Yahyaei 90+5'	Report

Khalifa Sports City Stadium, Isa Town
