= 2022–23 Bahraini Second Division =

Bahraini Second Division
- Season: 2022–23
- Champions: Al-Najma
- Promoted: Al-Najma; Busaiteen
- Matches: 132
- Goals: 371 (2.81 per match)
- Biggest home win: A'Ali 9–2 Al-Tadamun (10 April 2023)
- Biggest away win: Al-Ittihad 0–6 Al-Najma (28 April 2023)
- Highest scoring: A'Ali 9–2 Al-Tadamun (10 April 2023)
- Longest winning run: 10 matches Al-Najma
- Longest unbeaten run: 17 matches Al-Najma SC
- Longest winless run: 22 matches Al-Tadamun
- Longest losing run: 7 matches Al-Tadamun

The 2022–23 Bahraini Second Division, was the 20th edition of the second and lowest level football league in Bahrain. The season started on 8 September 2022 and ended on 11 May 2023.

== Team location ==
Locations of the football clubs of the Bahraini Second Division

== League table ==
| Pos | Team | Pld | W | D | L | GF | GA | GD | Pts | Qualification or relegation |
|---|---|---|---|---|---|---|---|---|---|---|
| 1 | Al-Najma (C, P) | 22 | 17 | 4 | 1 | 59 | 19 | +40 | 55 | Promotion to Bahraini Premier League |
| 2 | Busaiteen (P) | 22 | 12 | 5 | 5 | 41 | 23 | +18 | 41 | Promotion to Bahraini Premier League |
| 3 | A'Ali | 22 | 10 | 7 | 5 | 33 | 21 | +12 | 37 | Qualification for Promotion play-offs |
| 4 | Al-Ittifaq Maqaba | 22 | 9 | 5 | 8 | 28 | 27 | +1 | 32 | Qualification for Promotion play-offs |
| 5 | Umm Al-Hassam | 22 | 8 | 8 | 6 | 29 | 29 | 0 | 32 | |
| 6 | Buri | 22 | 8 | 7 | 7 | 31 | 31 | 0 | 31 | |
| 7 | Qalali | 22 | 7 | 8 | 7 | 33 | 26 | +7 | 29 | |
| 8 | Malkiya | 22 | 7 | 7 | 8 | 28 | 28 | 0 | 28 | |
| 9 | Al-Ittihad | 22 | 6 | 9 | 7 | 24 | 29 | −5 | 27 | |
| 10 | Isa Town | 22 | 7 | 5 | 10 | 33 | 39 | −6 | 26 | |
| 11 | Etehad Al-Reef | 22 | 3 | 4 | 15 | 18 | 51 | −33 | 13 | |
| 12 | Al-Tadamun | 22 | 0 | 7 | 15 | 14 | 48 | −34 | 7 | |

Source: Soccerway
Rules for classification: Points, Goal difference, Goals scored, Head-to-head points, Head-to-head goal difference, Head-to-head goals scored
(C) Champions; (P) Promoted

== Results ==
| Home \ Away | ALI | ITM | ITT | NAJ | TMN | BUR | BUS | REF | ISA | MAL | QAL | HSM |
|---|---|---|---|---|---|---|---|---|---|---|---|---|
| A'Ali | — | 2–0 | 1–1 | 1–2 | 9–2 | 0–0 | 1–0 | 2–1 | 1–0 | 0–2 | 0–0 | 0–1 |
| Al-Ittifaq Maqaba | 1–2 | — | 0–1 | 1–0 | 3–0 | 1–1 | 2–3 | 2–0 | 2–1 | 2–1 | 1–0 | 2–1 |
| Al-Ittihad | 0–1 | 2–1 | — | 0–6 | 2–0 | 1–2 | 3–3 | 2–0 | 1–3 | 0–1 | 1–1 | 0–0 |
| Al-Najma | 2–2 | 2–0 | 2–1 | — | 2–1 | 3–1 | 4–2 | 3–0 | 2–1 | 4–0 | 1–1 | 3–1 |
| Al-Tadamun | 0–2 | 1–1 | 1–1 | 0–3 | — | 0–2 | 0–1 | 1–1 | 0–1 | 0–0 | 0–3 | 2–2 |
| Buri | 2–2 | 1–0 | 1–2 | 0–4 | 2–2 | — | 2–1 | 3–1 | 1–3 | 2–1 | 2–0 | 2–0 |
| Busaiteen | 1–2 | 2–0 | 1–1 | 2–3 | 1–0 | 1–0 | — | 2–0 | 4–0 | 1–1 | 3–0 | 3–0 |
| Etehad Al-Reef | 0–1 | 0–1 | 1–2 | 0–4 | 1–1 | 0–0 | 1–5 | — | 3–2 | 1–0 | 3–7 | 0–2 |
| Isa Town | 2–1 | 3–4 | 2–1 | 2–5 | 3–0 | 3–3 | 1–2 | 0–0 | — | 1–2 | 0–3 | 1–1 |
| Malkiya | 1–1 | 1–0 | 1–1 | 0–1 | 3–2 | 3–1 | 2–2 | 5–2 | 2–2 | — | 1–2 | 0–1 |
| Qalali | 1–1 | 1–1 | 0–0 | 2–2 | 3–0 | 0–2 | 0–0 | 2–3 | 0–1 | 1–0 | — | 1–3 |
| Umm Al-Hassam | 2–1 | 2–2 | 1–1 | 1–1 | 2–1 | 2–1 | 0–1 | 4–0 | 1–1 | 1–1 | 1–5 | — |

Source: Soccerway
Legend: Blue = home team win; Yellow = draw; Red = away team win.

== Promotion play-offs ==
In this edition of the promotion play-offs, the eighth and ninth-placed teams of the 2022–23 Bahraini Premier League were joined by the third and fourth-placed teams of the Bahraini Second Division in a four-team group where each team played each other once. The top two teams of the group qualified for the 2023–24 edition of the Bahraini Premier League and the bottom two teams qualified for the 2023–24 edition of the Bahraini Second Division. The promotion play-offs started on 23 May and ended on 31 May 2023.

=== Table ===
| Pos | Team | Pld | W | D | L | GF | GA | GD | Pts | Qualification or relegation |
|---|---|---|---|---|---|---|---|---|---|---|
| 1 | East Riffa | 3 | 1 | 2 | 0 | 4 | 2 | +2 | 5 | Promotion to Bahraini Premier League |
| 2 | Al-Hala | 3 | 1 | 2 | 0 | 3 | 2 | +1 | 5 | Promotion to Bahraini Premier League |
| 3 | Al-Ittifaq Maqaba | 3 | 1 | 0 | 2 | 3 | 5 | −2 | 3 | Relegation to Bahraini Second Division |
| 4 | A'Ali | 3 | 0 | 2 | 1 | 4 | 5 | −1 | 2 | Relegation to Bahraini Second Division |

Source: Soccerway

=== Results ===
| Home \ Away | ALI | HAL | ITM | EAS |
|---|---|---|---|---|
| A'Ali | | 1–1 | | |
| Al-Hala | | | 1–0 | |
| Al-Ittifaq Maqaba | 3–2 | | | 0–2 |
| East Riffa | 1–1 | 1–1 | | |

Source: Soccerway
Legend: Blue = home team win; Yellow = draw; Red = away team win.
