= 2021–22 Bahraini Premier League =

Bahrain Premier League
- Season: 2021–22
- Champions: Al-Riffa (14th title)
- Relegated: Al-Najma SC
- Matches: 96
- Goals: 233 (2.43 per match)
- Top goalscorer: Mahdi Abduljabbar (17 goals)
- Biggest home win: Manama 6–0 Al-Hidd (11 February 2022)
- Biggest away win: Budaiya 0–4 Al-Riffa (5 January 2022)
- Highest scoring: East Riffa 3–4 Al-Ahli (18 February 2022)

The 2021–22 Bahraini Premier League (also known as Nasser Bin Hamad Premier League) was the 65th top-level football season in Bahrain. The season started on 25 August 2021 and ended on 16 May 2022.

== Team location ==
Location football club of Bahraini Premier League

== League table ==
Pos	Team	Pld	W	D	L	GF	GA	GD	Pts	Qualification or relegation
1	Al-Riffa (C)	18	12	6	0	32	9	+23	42	Qualification for the 2023-24 AFC Cup Group Stage
2	Manama	18	11	6	1	31	13	+18	39	
3	Al-Khaldiya	18	8	6	4	24	13	+11	30	
4	Al-Muharraq	18	8	3	7	22	19	+3	27	
5	Al-Hala	18	6	7	5	21	24	−3	25	
6	East Riffa	18	6	6	6	24	22	+2	24	
7	Al-Ahli	18	3	8	7	18	29	−11	17 (Note: Head-to-head points: Al-Ahli: 4, Budaiya: 1)	
8	Budaiya (O)	18	5	2	11	19	29	−10	17	Qualification for Relegation play-offs
9	Al-Hidd (O)	18	2	7	9	13	27	−14	13	Qualification for Relegation play-offs
10	Al-Najma SC (R)	18	1	5	12	12	31	−19	8	Relegation to Bahraini Second Division

Source: Soccerway
Rules for classification: Points, Head-to-head points, Head-to-head goal difference, Head-to-head goals scored, Total goal difference, Total goals scored
(C) Champions; (O) Play-off winners; (R) Relegated

== Results ==
Home \ Away	AHL	HAL	HID	KHA	MUH	NAJ	RIF	BUD	EAS	MAN	AHL	HAL	HID	KHA	MUH	NAJ	RIF	BUD	EAS	MAN
Al-Ahli		1–1	0–0	0–2		1–1		1–1		1–1		1–1	1–1			2–1				
Al-Hala				3–3	1–2	1–1	1–1	2–1		2–4					0–2			1–0		0–0
Al-Hidd		0–0		0–1	0–2	1–2	2–2	1–0		2–2		0–1			0–1			2–3		
Al-Khaldiya	0–0	2–0	1–1		1–0	3–0	0–1	2–0	1–1	1–2								4–1		
Al-Muharraq	4–0			0–1		1–0	0–0		2–3	1–2	1–0								0–0	
Al-Najma SC		2–3	1–2	0–0	0–2		0–3	0–1		1–1							0–2	0–2		
Al-Riffa	3–2	3–1	1–0	1–0	4–1			1–0	0–0	0–0	2–0								2–2	
Budaiya	2–3				1–1		0–4		1–2	1–2					3–2				2–0	0–1
East Riffa	2–0	0–1	1–1	1–1		3–2					3–4	1–2	2–0			3–1				
Manama	3–1		6–0	2–1	3–0	0–0	0–2		1–0										1–0	

Source: Soccerway
Legend: Blue = home team win; Yellow = draw; Red = away team win.

== Relegation play-offs ==
In this edition of the relegation play-offs, the eighth and ninth-placed teams of the Bahraini Premier League were joined by the third and fourth-placed teams of the 2021–22 Bahraini Second Division in a four-team group stage where each team played each other once. The top three teams of the group qualified for the 2022–23 edition of the Bahraini Premier League and the bottom team qualified for the 2022–23 edition of the Bahraini Second Division. The relegation play-offs started on 6 May and ended on 16 May 2022.

=== Table ===
Pos	Team	Pld	W	D	L	GF	GA	GD	Pts	Qualification or relegation
1	Al-Hidd	3	2	1	0	6	3	+3	7	Promotion to Bahraini Premier League
2	Sitra (P)	3	1	2	0	3	2	+1	5	Promotion to Bahraini Premier League
3	Budaiya	3	1	1	1	5	5	0	4	Promotion to Bahraini Premier League
4	Malkiya	3	0	0	3	3	7	−4	0	Relegation to Bahraini Second Division

Source: Soccerway
(P) Promoted

=== Results ===
Home \ Away	HID	BUD	MAL	SIT
Al-Hidd				1–1
Budaiya	1–2		3–2	
Malkiya	1–3			
Sitra		1–1	1–0	

Source: Soccerway
Legend: Blue = home team win; Yellow = draw; Red = away team win.

== Season statistics ==
=== Top scorers ===
Rank	Player	Club	Goals
1	(Bahrain) Mahdi Abduljabbar	Manama	17
2	(Bahrain) Abdullah Al Hashash	Budaiya	10
3	(Bahrain) Mohamed Marhoon	Al-Riffa	9
3	(Bahrain) Ismail Abdullatif	Al-Khaldiya	9
5	(Bahrain) Mohamed Khalid Shahin	Budaiya	6
6	(Bahrain) Kamil Al Aswad	Al-Riffa	5
6	(Syria) Mohamad Al Hallak	Manama	5
6	(Bahrain) Mahdi Al-Humaidan	Al-Khaldiya	5
6	(Bahrain) Abd Al Fatah Basheer	Al-Hala	5
10	(Nigeria) Prince Obus Aggreh	East Riffa	4
10	(Bahrain) Sami Al-Husaini	East Riffa	4
10	(Bahrain) Mohamed Al-Romaihi	Al-Riffa	4
10	(Brazil) Flávio Carioca	Al-Muharraq	4
10	(Bahrain) Ali Muneer	Al-Najma SC	4
10	(Russia) Artyom Serdyuk	Al-Ahli	4
