= 2022–23 Bahraini Premier League =

Bahraini Premier League
- Season: 2022–23
- Champions: Al-Khaldiya
- Relegated: Budaiya; Bahrain
- Matches: 132
- Goals: 333 (2.52 per match)
- Top goalscorer: Mahdi Al-Humaidan; 14 goals
- Biggest home win: Al-Riffa 7–0 Budaiya (8 May 2023)
- Biggest away win: Budaiya 0–6 Al-Khaldiya (4 May 2023)
- Highest scoring: East Riffa 3–5 Manama (27 November 2022); Al-Hidd 3–5 Al-Khaldiya (7 March 2023)
- Longest winning run: 4 matches Manama
- Longest unbeaten run: 11 matches Al-Muharraq
- Longest winless run: 13 matches Budaiya
- Longest losing run: 11 matches Budaiya

The 2022–23 Bahraini Premier League (also known as Nasser Bin Hamad Premier League) was the 66th top-level football season in Bahrain. The season started on 11 September 2022 and ended on 18 May 2023.

== Team location ==
Locations of the football clubs of the Bahraini Premier League

== League table ==
Pos	Team	Pld	W	D	L	GF	GA	GD	Pts	Qualification or relegation
1	Al-Khaldiya (C)	22	12	6	4	45	23	+22	42	
2	Manama	22	11	8	3	35	16	+19	41	
3	Al-Muharraq	22	10	10	2	34	12	+22	40	
4	Al-Riffa	22	11	6	5	37	19	+18	39	
5	Sitra	22	10	8	4	30	20	+10	38	
6	Al-Ahli	22	7	10	5	24	23	+1	31	
7	Al-Hidd	22	7	6	9	29	38	−9	27 (Note: Al-Hidd: 4 pts, Al-Shabab: 1 pts.)	
8	Al-Shabab	22	7	6	9	21	25	−4	27	
9	East Riffa (O)	22	5	9	8	24	26	−2	24 (Note: Budaiya were deducted 6 points after they walked off the field to protest the officiating during the match against East Riffa. The match was originally a 2–1 win for East Riffa but they ended up being awarded a 3–0 victory.)	Qualification for Relegation play-offs
10	Al-Hala (O)	22	5	6	11	22	34	−12	21	Qualification for Relegation play-offs
11	Bahrain SC (R)	22	4	7	11	22	32	−10	19	Relegation to Bahraini Second Division
12	Budaiya (R)	22	1	2	19	10	65	−55	−1	Relegation to Bahraini Second Division

Source: Soccerway
Rules for classification: Points, Head-to-head points, Head-to-head goal difference, Head-to-head goals scored, Total goal difference, Total goals scored
(C) Champions; (O) Play-off winners; (R) Relegated

== Results ==
Home \ Away	AHL	HAL	HID	KHA	MUH	RIF	SHB	BHR	BUD	EAS	MAN	SIT
Al-Ahli	—	0–0	0–2	0–3	0–0	1–0	0–0	1–1	2–1	1–0	1–1	1–2
Al-Hala	0–3	—	2–1	1–2	0–1	1–3	1–0	1–0	1–1	0–0	0–1	2–3
Al-Hidd	1–1	2–3	—	3–5	1–3	1–3	2–2	2–2	2–1	0–0	1–0	0–2
Al-Khaldiya	0–1	2–2	4–0	—	2–0	3–2	1–0	1–1	5–1	1–1	0–1	2–2
Al-Muharraq	1–1	2–0	2–0	1–1	—	0–0	2–1	0–0	4–0	2–2	1–1	0–0
Al-Riffa	1–1	4–1	1–1	3–1	0–3	—	1–0	3–0	7–0	0–1	0–1	1–1
Al-Shabab	0–0	1–0	1–2	0–1	0–5	2–2	—	3–2	3–0	1–0	0–1	0–2
Bahrain SC	2–1	2–1	1–4	0–1	0–0	0–1	2–3	—	2–0	2–4	0–1	3–1
Budaiya	1–4	0–2	0–1	0–6	1–5	0–2	0–2	1–0	—	0–0	0–5	1–2
East Riffa	2–4	3–1	0–1	1–1	1–1	0–1	0–1	1–1	3–0 (Note: The East Riffa v Budaiya match was originally 2–1 to East Riffa, but was awarded as a 3–0 win to East Riffa due to Budaiya players walking off the field to protest the officiating.)	—	3–5	0–2
Manama	5–1	1–1	3–0	2–1	0–1	1–1	0–0	1–1	4–1	1–1	—	0–2
Sitra	0–0	2–2	2–2	1–2	1–0	0–1	1–1	1–0	3–1	0–1	0–0	—

Source: Soccerway
Legend: Blue = home team win; Yellow = draw; Red = away team win.

== Relegation play-offs ==
In this edition of the relegation play-offs, the ninth and tenth-placed teams of the Bahraini Premier League were joined by the third and fourth-placed teams of the 2022–23 Bahraini Second Division in a four-team group where each team played each other once. The top two teams of the group qualified for the 2023–24 edition of the Bahraini Premier League and the bottom two teams qualified for the 2023–24 edition of the Bahraini Second Division. The relegation play-offs started on 23 May and ended on 31 May 2023.

=== Table ===
Pos	Team	Pld	W	D	L	GF	GA	GD	Pts	Qualification or relegation
1	East Riffa	3	1	2	0	4	2	+2	5	Promotion to Bahraini Premier League
2	Al-Hala	3	1	2	0	3	2	+1	5	Promotion to Bahraini Premier League
3	Al-Ittifaq Maqaba	3	1	0	2	3	5	−2	3	Relegation to Bahraini Second Division
4	A'Ali	3	0	2	1	4	5	−1	2	Relegation to Bahraini Second Division

Source: Soccerway

=== Results ===
Home \ Away	ALI	HAL	ITM	EAS
A'Ali		1–1		
Al-Hala			1–0	
Al-Ittifaq Maqaba	3–2			0–2
East Riffa	1–1	1–1		

Source: Soccerway
Legend: Blue = home team win; Yellow = draw; Red = away team win.

== Season statistics ==
=== Top scorers ===
Rank	Player	Club	Goals
1	(Bahrain) Mahdi Al-Humaidan	Al-Khaldiya	14
2	(Bahrain) Mahdi Abduljabbar	Manama	13
3	(Bahrain) Thiago Augusto	Al-Hidd	11
4	(Chad) Othman Alhaj	Sitra	9
5	(Algeria) Samy Frioui	Al-Khaldiya	8
6	(Brazil) Joel Vinicius	Bahrain	7
6	(Bahrain) Ismael Abdullatif	Al-Khaldiya	7
6	(Jordan) Amin Al-Shanaineh	Al-Riffa	7
9	(Bahrain) Kamil Al-Aswad	Al-Riffa	6
9	(Ghana) Ernest Barfo	Sitra	6
9	(Italy) Mario Fontanella	Al-Muharraq	6
9	(Syria) Mohammad Al Marmour	Manama	6

=== Hat-tricks ===
Player	For	Against	Result	Date
(Syria) Mohammad Al Marmour	Manama	Budaiya	5–0 (A)	15 December 2022
(Bahrain) Mahdi Abduljabbar	Manama	Al-Ahli	5–1 (H)	27 January 2023
(Colombia) Víctor Arboleda	Al-Muharraq	Al-Shabab	5–0 (A)	9 April 2023
(Bahrain) Mahdi Al-Humaidan	Al-Khaldiya	Budaiya	6–0 (A)	4 May 2023
