= Bahraini Second Division =

Second-tier football league in Bahrain

- Founded: 2002; 24 years ago
- Country: Bahrain
- Confederation: AFC
- Number of clubs: 12
- Level on pyramid: 2
- Promotion to: Bahraini Premier League
- Domestic cup: King's Cup
- League cup: FA Cup
- International cup: AFC Champions League Two (via King's Cup)
- Current champions: Budaiya (2nd title) (2024–25)
- Most championships: Al-Hidd; Al-Shabab (3 titles)
- Broadcaster(s): Bahrain Sports TV
- Current: 2025–26 Bahraini Second Division

The Bahraini Second Division is the second-tier domestic football competition in the kingdom of Bahrain. The first season was held in 2002 for the 2002–03 season, however it was rebranded to the modern-day Second Division for the 2009–10 season. The champion and the second-placed team of the domestic league are directly promoted to the Bahraini Premier League, and promotion play-offs are held between the teams of both leagues to decide the two other promoted teams. The championship is currently contested by 12 clubs.

== Structure ==
=== Current structure ===
Twelve clubs currently play two round robin set of fixtures totaling twenty-two home and away games in order to determine the league champions. The first and second-placed clubs are promoted with the third and fourth entering the promotion play-offs.

== Clubs (2024–25) ==
- Al-Hala
- Al-Hidd
- Al-Ittifaq Maqaba
- Al-Ittihad
- Al-Tadamun
- Budaiya
- Buri
- Busaiteen
- Etehad Al-Reef
- Isa Town
- Qalali
- Umm Al-Hassam

== List of champions ==
Champions are:

Years	Champions
2002–03	Al-Sahel (now Al-Hidd) (1)
2003–04	Manama (1)
2004–05	Sitra (1)
2005–06	Al-Hala (1)
2006–07	Al-Hidd (2)
2007–08	Malkiya (1)
2008–09	Not held (expansion)
2009–10	Al-Hidd (3)
2010–11	East Riffa (1)
2011–12	Al-Shabab (1)
2012–13	Sitra (2)
2013–14	East Riffa (2)
2014–15	Al-Ahli (1)
2015–16	Bahrain SC (1)
2016–17	Al-Shabab (2)
2017–18	Budaiya (1)
2018–19	Al-Ahli (2)
2019–20	Malkiya (2)
2020–21	Al-Hala (2)
2021–22	Al-Shabab (3)
2022–23	Al-Najma (1)
2023–24	Bahrain SC (2)

== Total championships ==
The number of Second Division championships that clubs in Bahrain have attained.

Club	Number of Championships
Al-Hidd (includes Al-Sahel)	3
Al-Shabab	3
Al-Ahli	2
Al-Hala	2
Bahrain SC	2
East Riffa	2
Malkiya	2
Sitra	2
Al-Najma	1
Budaiya	1
Manama	1
