= Lukman Murad =

Swedish footballer

Personal information
- Date of birth: June 5, 1996 (age 30)
- Place of birth: Qamishli, Syria
- Positions: Midfielder; winger; forward

Senior career*
Years	Team	Apps	(Gls)
-2016	Örebro SK	0	(0)
2014-2016	BK Forward→(loan)	41	(6)
2016	Örebro Syrianska IF	9	(0)
2017	Syrianska IF Kerburan	12	(4)
2017-2018	That Ras Club		
2018	IK Franke	18	(3)
2019	Malkiya Club		
2019-	Syrianska IF Kerburan	18	(6)
- * Club domestic league appearances and goals

Lukman Murad (Arabic: لقمان مراد; born 5 June 1996 in Syria) is a Swedish footballer.

== Career ==
From 2017 to 2018, Murad played professionally for Jordanian top flight side That Ras Club.

For 2019, he signed for Malkiya Club in Bahrain due to finding it difficult to reach the top 2 divisions in Sweden from the lower leagues.

He is eligible to represent Syria internationally.
