= 2022 Bahraini Super Cup =

- Event: Bahraini Super Cup
Al-Riffa	Al-Khaldiya
0	2
- Date: 15 September 2022
- Venue: Bahrain National Stadium, Riffa

The 2022 Bahraini Super Cup was the 16th season of the Bahraini Super Cup, an annual Bahraini football match played between the winners of the previous season's Bahraini Premier League and Bahraini King's Cup. The match was contested by 2021–22 League champions Al-Riffa, and the 2021–22 Domestic Cup champions Al-Khaldiya.

== Match ==
=== Details ===
15 September 2022
18:30

Al-Riffa	0–2	Al-Khaldiya
	Report	58'; 60'

Bahrain National Stadium, Riffa
