= 2023–24 Bahraini Second Division =

Bahraini Second Division
- Season: 2023–24
- Champions: Bahrain SC
- Promoted: Bahrain SC; A'Ali; Malkiya
- Matches: 132
- Goals: 352 (2.67 per match)
- Biggest home win: Malkiya 8–0 Etehad Al-Reef (25 April 2024)
- Biggest away win: Etehad Al-Reef 0–6 Al-Ittifaq Maqaba (5 April 2024)
- Highest scoring: Malkiya 8–0 Etehad Al-Reef (25 April 2024)
- Longest winning run: 7 matches Al-Ittihad
- Longest unbeaten run: 18 matches A'Ali
- Longest winless run: 22 matches Al-Tadamun
- Longest losing run: 16 matches Al-Tadamun

The 2023–24 Bahraini Second Division was the 21st edition of the second and lowest level football league in Bahrain. The season started on 20 September 2023 and ended on 2 May 2024.

== Team location ==
Locations of the football clubs of the Bahraini Second Division

== League table ==
Pos	Team	Pld	W	D	L	GF	GA	GD	Pts	Qualification or relegation
1	Bahrain SC (C, P)	22	15	4	3	49	20	+29	49	Promotion to Bahraini Premier League
2	A'Ali (P)	22	13	7	2	46	16	+30	46	Promotion to Bahraini Premier League
3	Malkiya (O, P)	22	12	9	1	37	8	+29	45	Qualification for Promotion play-offs
4	Al-Ittihad	22	13	4	5	39	25	+14	43	Qualification for Promotion play-offs
5	Budaiya	22	11	8	3	32	12	+20	41	
6	Al-Ittifaq Maqaba	22	9	5	8	41	28	+13	32	
7	Isa Town	22	7	6	9	25	31	−6	27	
8	Buri	22	5	9	8	19	27	−8	24	
9	Umm Al-Hassam	22	5	3	14	22	36	−14	18	
10	Qalali	22	5	3	14	15	39	−24	18	
11	Etehad Al-Reef	22	4	5	13	19	55	−36	17	
12	Al-Tadamun	22	0	3	19	8	55	−47	3	

Source: Soccerway
Rules for classification: Points, Goal difference, Goals scored, Head-to-head points, Head-to-head goal difference, Head-to-head goals scored
(C) Champions; (O) Play-off winners; (P) Promoted

== Results ==
Home \ Away	ALI	ITM	ITT	TMN	BHR	BUD	BUR	REF	ISA	MAL	QAL	HSM
A'Ali	—	0–0	3–0	3–0	1–0	1–1	3–1	4–0	5–0	1–1	2–1	0–1
Al-Ittifaq Maqaba	1–1	—	0–2	5–2	1–3	1–2	1–1	5–1	3–1	0–2	5–0	1–2
Al-Ittihad	3–3	2–0	—	2–1	1–2	0–2	3–1	4–1	3–2	0–2	2–1	4–3
Al-Tadamun	1–6	0–1	1–2	—	0–4	0–5	0–1	1–2	0–3	0–2	0–2	1–1
Bahrain SC	0–3	4–2	0–2	6–0	—	2–1	4–2	4–0	1–0	1–1	4–0	4–2
Budaiya	0–0	1–0	0–0	2–0	1–1	—	1–0	2–2	2–0	0–1	3–0	2–1
Buri	0–1	1–1	0–2	1–0	0–2	0–0	—	1–1	2–2	1–1	1–0	2–1
Etehad Al-Reef	1–6	0–6	0–0	2–0	0–1	0–3	1–1	—	0–0	0–2	1–2	1–2
Isa Town	0–1	1–3	1–1	1–1	0–2	1–0	1–1	3–2	—	0–1	2–1	3–1
Malkiya	3–1	0–0	2–1	0–0	1–1	2–2	0–0	8–0	0–1	—	4–0	2–0
Qalali	0–1	1–3	0–4	2–0	0–1	0–0	2–1	0–2	1–1	0–0	—	2–0
Umm Al-Hassam	1–1	1–2	0–1	2–0	2–2	0–2	0–1	0–2	0–2	0–1	2–0	—

Source: Soccerway
Legend: Blue = home team win; Yellow = draw; Red = away team win.

=== Results by round ===
Team ╲ Round	1	2	3	4	5	6	7	8	9	10	11	12	13	14	15	16	17	18	19	20	21	22
A'Ali	W	W	D	D	D	W	W	D	W	D	W	W	W	W	D	D	W	W	L	W	L	W
Al-Ittifaq Maqaba	L	W	L	D	L	L	W	W	W	W	D	L	W	L	D	D	L	L	W	W	W	D
Al-Ittihad	W	D	D	L	L	D	D	W	W	W	W	W	L	L	L	W	W	W	W	W	W	W
Al-Tadamun	L	D	L	L	D	D	L	L	L	L	L	L	L	L	L	L	L	L	L	L	L	L
Bahrain SC	D	W	W	W	W	W	L	D	D	W	W	W	W	W	W	L	W	L	W	D	W	W
Budaiya	D	D	W	D	D	D	W	D	W	L	W	W	W	W	W	D	L	D	L	W	W	W
Buri	D	L	D	L	D	W	W	D	W	L	D	L	L	D	L	D	W	W	D	L	L	D
Etehad Al-Reef	L	L	L	W	D	D	L	L	L	L	L	W	W	D	W	D	L	D	L	L	L	L
Isa Town	L	L	W	W	W	D	D	D	L	W	L	W	L	D	W	D	W	L	D	L	L	L
Malkiya	W	D	D	W	W	D	D	D	D	W	W	L	W	D	W	D	W	W	W	D	W	W
Qalali	W	L	L	D	L	L	D	W	L	L	L	L	L	W	L	D	L	L	W	W	L	L
Umm Al-Hassam	D	W	W	L	D	L	L	L	L	D	L	L	L	L	L	W	L	W	L	L	W	L

Source: Soccerway
W = Win; D = Draw; L = Lose

== Promotion play-offs ==
In this edition of the promotion play-offs, the eighth and ninth-placed teams of the 2023–24 Bahraini Premier League were joined by the third and fourth-placed teams of the Bahraini Second Division in a four-team group where each team played each other once. The top two teams of the group qualified for the 2024–25 edition of the Bahraini Premier League and the bottom two teams qualified for the 2024–25 edition of the Bahraini Second Division. The promotion play-offs started on 23 May and ended on 31 May 2024.

=== Table ===
Pos	Team	Pld	W	D	L	GF	GA	GD	Pts	Qualification or relegation
1	Malkiya (P)	3	2	1	0	8	4	+4	7	Promotion to Bahraini Premier League
2	East Riffa	3	2	1	0	6	3	+3	7	Promotion to Bahraini Premier League
3	Al-Hidd (R)	3	1	0	2	4	6	−2	3	Relegation to Bahraini Second Division
4	Al-Ittihad	3	0	0	3	2	7	−5	0	Relegation to Bahraini Second Division

Source: Soccerway
(P) Promoted; (R) Relegated

=== Results ===
Home \ Away	HID	ITT	EAS	MAL
Al-Hidd		2–1		1–3
Al-Ittihad			0–2	
East Riffa	2–1			2–2
Malkiya		3–1		

Source: Soccerway
Legend: Blue = home team win; Yellow = draw; Red = away team win.
