= 2023–24 Bahraini Premier League =

Bahraini Premier League
- Season: 2023–24
- Champions: Al-Khaldiya
- Relegated: Busaiteen; Al-Hala; Al-Hidd
- AFC Champions League Two: Al-Khaldiya; Al-Ahli
- AGCFF Gulf Club Champions League: Al-Riffa
- Matches: 132
- Goals: 376 (2.85 per match)
- Top goalscorer: Juninho; 20 goals
- Biggest home win: Al-Khaldiya 7–0 Al-Hala (14 May 2024)
- Biggest away win: Al-Hala 0–5 Al-Najma (6 October 2023)
- Highest scoring: Al-Khaldiya 7–1 Al-Ahli (8 October 2023); Al-Hidd 3–5 Sitra (9 November 2023)
- Longest winning run: 4 matches Al-Ahli; Al-Khaldiya; Al-Riffa
- Longest unbeaten run: 13 matches Al-Khaldiya
- Longest winless run: 11 matches East Riffa
- Longest losing run: 5 matches Busaiteen; East Riffa

The 2023–24 Bahraini Premier League (also known as Nasser Bin Hamad Premier League) was the 67th top-level football season in Bahrain. The regular season started on 22 September 2023 and ended on 20 May 2024. The relegation play-offs then commenced on 23 May and concluded on 31 May 2024.

Al-Khaldiya, the defending champions won their second consecutive and second league title in total.

== Team location ==
Locations of the football clubs of the Bahraini Premier League

== League table ==
Pos	Team	Pld	W	D	L	GF	GA	GD	Pts	Qualification or relegation
1	Al-Khaldiya (C)	22	12	8	2	45	18	+27	44	Qualification for the AFC Champions League Two group stage
2	Al-Riffa	22	10	7	5	35	26	+9	37 (Note: Al-Riffa: 4 pts, Al-Muharraq: 1 pts.)	Qualification for the AGCFF Gulf Club Champions League group stage
3	Al-Muharraq	22	9	10	3	40	28	+12	37	
4	Al-Ahli	22	9	6	7	32	30	+2	33 (Note: Al-Ahli: 4 pts, Manama: 1 pts.)	Qualification for the AFC Champions League Two qualifying play-offs (Note: Al-Ahli qualified for the AFC Champions League Two qualifying play-offs as the 2023–24 Bahraini King's Cup winners.)
5	Manama	22	9	6	7	28	26	+2	33	
6	Al-Najma	22	7	6	9	40	42	−2	27 (Note: Tied on head-to-head tiebreakers. Overall goal difference used.)	
7	Al-Shabab	22	7	6	9	28	33	−5	27	
8	Sitra	22	5	11	6	29	33	−4	26 (Note: Sitra: 6 pts, Al-Hidd: 5 pts, East Riffa: 3 pts.)	
9	Al-Hidd (R)	22	6	8	8	29	33	−4	26	Qualification for Relegation play-offs
10	East Riffa (O)	22	6	8	8	27	29	−2	26	Qualification for Relegation play-offs
11	Al-Hala (R)	22	6	2	14	17	41	−24	20	Relegation to Bahraini Second Division
12	Busaiteen (R)	22	4	6	12	26	37	−11	18	Relegation to Bahraini Second Division

Source: Soccerway
Rules for classification: Points, Head-to-head points, Head-to-head goal difference, Head-to-head goals scored, Total goal difference, Total goals scored
(C) Champions; (O) Play-off winners; (R) Relegated

== Results ==
Home \ Away	AHL	HAL	HID	KHA	MUH	NAJ	RIF	SHB	BUS	EAS	MAN	SIT
Al-Ahli	—	1–2	3–3	0–1	2–2	2–0	2–1	0–1	2–2	1–0	0–0	3–1
Al-Hala	0–3	—	0–2	1–3	1–2	0–5	1–2	0–1	1–0	1–0	0–0	1–2
Al-Hidd	0–1	2–0	—	0–0	1–2	2–1	1–4	1–0	2–1	1–1	0–2	3–5
Al-Khaldiya	7–1	7–0	1–1	—	0–0	4–2	1–1	2–2	1–0	3–2	0–0	4–1
Al-Muharraq	1–1	3–1	3–2	1–1	—	2–1	1–1	3–0	0–0	2–2	3–1	1–1
Al-Najma	2–1	2–4	4–2	1–1	1–1	—	3–3	3–2	0–1	2–1	1–4	2–2
Al-Riffa	1–2	2–0	0–0	1–0	3–2	2–2	—	3–1	1–0	0–1	1–2	1–1
Al-Shabab	1–1	0–1	1–0	0–1	3–2	2–1	4–2	—	3–2	1–2	0–2	1–2
Busaiteen	0–2	2–1	2–2	1–2	2–1	2–3	1–3	1–1	—	1–3	1–3	2–2
East Riffa	2–1	0–0	1–3	3–0	2–2	0–1	1–1	1–1	1–3	—	2–1	1–1
Manama	2–3	1–2	0–0	0–4	0–3	3–2	0–1	1–1	2–1	2–0	—	0–0
Sitra	1–0	1–0	1–1	0–2	2–3	1–1	0–1	2–2	1–1	1–1	1–2	—

Source: Soccerway
Legend: Blue = home team win; Yellow = draw; Red = away team win.

=== Results by round ===
Team ╲ Round	1	2	3	4	5	6	7	8	9	10	11	12	13	14	15	16	17	18	19	20	21	22
Al-Ahli	L	W	L	D	D	W	W	W	W	D	L	W	L	L	D	W	D	L	D	W	L	W
Al-Hala	W	W	L	L	L	W	L	W	L	L	W	L	D	W	L	L	L	L	D	L	L	L
Al-Hidd	L	L	L	W	W	L	D	L	D	L	L	L	D	W	W	D	D	D	D	W	D	W
Al-Khaldiya	W	D	W	W	D	D	D	L	D	W	W	W	D	W	W	W	W	D	D	W	W	L
Al-Muharraq	W	D	L	D	L	D	W	W	D	W	W	W	D	D	D	W	L	W	W	D	D	D
Al-Najma	D	W	W	W	D	D	L	L	L	L	W	L	D	L	W	D	L	W	W	L	D	L
Al-Riffa	D	W	W	W	L	W	L	W	W	W	W	D	D	D	L	W	D	D	D	L	W	L
Al-Shabab	L	L	W	W	L	D	L	D	L	D	D	D	W	L	W	L	W	L	D	L	W	W
Busaiteen	L	L	D	L	D	D	L	W	D	L	D	W	W	D	L	L	W	L	L	L	L	L
East Riffa	W	W	W	L	L	W	D	L	D	D	L	L	L	L	L	D	D	W	D	D	D	W
Manama	W	L	L	D	D	L	W	L	W	W	L	D	D	W	W	L	D	W	L	W	D	W
Sitra	L	L	D	D	D	W	W	W	D	L	L	L	W	D	L	D	D	D	D	W	D	D

Source: Soccerway
W = Win; D = Draw; L = Lose

== Relegation play-offs ==
In this edition of the relegation play-offs, the ninth and tenth-placed teams of the Bahraini Premier League were joined by the third and fourth-placed teams of the 2023–24 Bahraini Second Division in a four-team group where each team played each other once. The top two teams of the group qualified for the 2024–25 edition of the Bahraini Premier League and the bottom two teams qualified for the 2024–25 edition of the Bahraini Second Division. The relegation play-offs started on 23 May and ended on 31 May 2024.

=== Table ===
Pos	Team	Pld	W	D	L	GF	GA	GD	Pts	Qualification or relegation
1	Malkiya (P)	3	2	1	0	8	4	+4	7	Promotion to Bahraini Premier League
2	East Riffa	3	2	1	0	6	3	+3	7	Promotion to Bahraini Premier League
3	Al-Hidd (R)	3	1	0	2	4	6	−2	3	Relegation to Bahraini Second Division
4	Al-Ittihad	3	0	0	3	2	7	−5	0	Relegation to Bahraini Second Division

Source: Soccerway
(P) Promoted; (R) Relegated

=== Results ===
Home \ Away	HID	ITT	EAS	MAL
Al-Hidd		2–1		1–3
Al-Ittihad			0–2	
East Riffa	2–1			2–2
Malkiya		3–1		

Source: Soccerway
Legend: Blue = home team win; Yellow = draw; Red = away team win.

== Season statistics ==
=== Top scorers ===
Rank	Player	Club	Goals
1	(Brazil) Juninho	Al-Najma	20
2	(Iran) Amir Roustaei	Sitra	12
3	(Brazil) Romeu	Al-Shabab	10
4	(Bahrain) Kamil Al-Aswad	Al-Riffa	9
4	(Bahrain) Thiago Augusto	East Riffa	9
4	(Republic of the Congo) Jacques Thémopelé	Al-Hidd	9
7	(Bahrain) Husain Abdulkarim	Al-Muharraq	8
7	(Bahrain) Abdullah Al-Hashash	Al-Ahli	8
7	(Bahrain) Ebrahim Al-Khattal	Manama	8
7	(Senegal) Dominique Mendy	Al-Khaldiya	8
7	(Argentina) Facundo Tobares	Manama	8

=== Hat-tricks ===
Player	For	Against	Result	Date
(Senegal) Dominique Mendy	Al-Khaldiya	Al-Ahli	7–1 (H)	8 October 2023
(Bahrain) Husain Abdulkarim	Al-Muharraq	Al-Hidd	3–2 (H)	13 February 2024
(Brazil) Juninho	Al-Najma	Al-Riffa	3–3 (H)	8 March 2024
