= 1974–75 Bahraini Premier League =

Bahraini Premier League
- Season: 1974–75

The Bahraini Premier League is an association football league in Bahrain.

Statistics of Bahraini Premier League in the 1974–75 season.

The basketball league of the same name had its first season in 1974-1975.

== Overview ==
Arabi Club won the championship.
