= Mahdi Al-Humaidan =

Bahraini footballer (born 1993)

Personal information
- Full name: Mahdi Faisal Ebrahim Al-Humaidan
- Date of birth: 19 May 1993 (age 33)
- Place of birth: Manama, Bahrain
- Height: 1.72 m (5 ft 8 in)
- Position: Forward

Team information
- Current team: Qadsia SC

Senior career*
Years	Team	Apps	(Gls)
2017–2020	Al Ahli		
2020	→ Al-Qadsiah (loan)		
2021–	Al Khaldiya		(19)
2025–2026	→ Al-Zawraa (loan)	10	(2)
2026	→ Qadsia (loan)	11	(3)

International career^{‡}
2018–	Bahrain	67	(7)
Medal record
Men's football
Representing Bahrain
Gulf Cup
Winner	2019 Qatar
Winner	2024 Kuwait
- * Club domestic league appearances and goals as of 09:53, 6 January 2019 (UTC) ‡ National team caps and goals as of 08:00, 27 December 2024 (UTC)

Mahdi Faisal Ebrahim Al-Humaidan (Arabic: مَهْدِيّ فَيْصَل إبرَاهِيم الْحُمَيْدَان; born 19 May 1993) is a Bahraini footballer who plays as a forward for Qadsia and the Bahrain national team.

== International career ==
Al-Humaidan was included in Bahrain's squad for the 2019 AFC Asian Cup in the United Arab Emirates. Humaidan played twice for Bahrain during the Asian Cup which ended in an eventual Round of 16 elimination to South Korea after Extra Time. During the 24th Arabian Gulf Cup, Humaidan played in three matches - against Oman, Kuwait and Saudi Arabia in the Final. In total he provided 3 assists, including the winning assist in the Final to Mohamed Al Romaihi which won Bahrain their first ever Gulf Cup.

== Career statistics ==
As of 29 June 2026

Appearances and goals by club, season and competition
Club	Season	League			Cup		Continental		Other (Note: All appearance(s) in Bahrain Kings Cup, Kuwait Crown Prince Cup, Kuwait Super Cup)		Total	
Club	Season	Division	Apps	Goals	Apps	Goals	Apps	Goals	Apps	Goals	Apps	Goals
Qadsia	2025–26	Kuwaiti Premier League	11	3	1	0	3	0	2	0	17	3
Career total			11	3	1	0	3	0	2	0	17	3

=== International ===
As of 8 December 2019

Bahrain
Year	Apps	Goals	Assists
2018	2	0	0
2019	9	0	4
Total	11	0	4

=== International goals ===
Scores and results list Bahrain's goal tally first.

No.	Date	Venue	Opponent	Score	Result	Competition
1.	19 November 2018	Sultan Qaboos Sports Complex, Muscat, Oman	Oman	1–1	1–2	Friendly
2.	3 March 2022	Bahrain National Stadium, Riffa, Bahrain	India	2–1	2–1	Friendly
3.	27 May 2022	BG Stadium, Thanyaburi, Thailand	Myanmar	2–0	2–0	Friendly
4.	11 November 2022	Khalifa Sports City Stadium, Isa Town, Bahrain	Canada	1–1	2–2	Friendly
5.	13 January 2023	Basra International Stadium, Basra, Iraq	Kuwait	1–0	1–1	25th Arabian Gulf Cup
6.	21 March 2024	Bahrain National Stadium, Riffa, Bahrain	Nepal	1–0	5–0	2026 FIFA World Cup qualification
7.	22 December 2024	Jaber Al-Ahmad International Stadium, Kuwait City, Kuwait	Saudi Arabia	2–0	3–2	26th Arabian Gulf Cup
8.	9 December 2025	Education City Stadium, Al Rayyan, Qatar	Sudan	3–1	3–1	2025 FIFA Arab Cup

== Honours ==
Bahrain

- Arabian Gulf Cup: 2019، 2024-25

Al-Khaldiya

- Bahraini Premier League: 2022–23, 2023–24
- Bahraini King's Cup: 2021-22, 2024-25
- Bahraini Super Cup: 2022-23, 2023-24, 2024-25
- Khalid Bin Hamad Cup: 2024-25

Qadsia

- Kuwait Super Cup: 2025-26

Individual

- Bahrain Premier League top scorer (Golden Boot): Golden Boot Bahrain League 2022–23
