= Mahdi Abduljabbar =

Bahraini footballer

Personal information
- Full name: Mahdi Abduljabbar Mahdi Darwish Hassan
- Date of birth: 25 June 1991 (age 35)
- Place of birth: Manama, Bahrain
- Height: 1.75 m (5 ft 9 in)
- Position: Striker

Senior career*
Years	Team	Apps	(Gls)
2008–2018	Al-Ittihad		
2012–2014	→ Al-Taliya (loan)		
2018–2020	Al-Riffa		(10)
2020–2023	Manama		(42)
2023–2026	Al-Khaldiya SC		(7)
2026-	Naft Maysan	8	(1)

International career^{‡}
2016–	Bahrain	41	(13)
Medal record
Men's football
Representing Bahrain
Gulf Cup
Winner	2024 Kuwait
- * Club domestic league appearances and goals ‡ National team caps and goals as of 27 December 2024

Mahdi Abduljabbar Mahdi Darwish Hassan (Arabic: مَهْدِيّ عَبْد الْجَبَّار مَهْدِيّ دَرْوِيش حَسَن; born 25 June 1991) is a Bahraini footballer who currently plays for Bahrain national team as a striker.

== Career ==
=== International career ===
He made his debut for Bahrain national football team on 9 May 2017 against Chinese Taipei as part of the 2019 AFC Asian Cup qualification.

Mahdi scored his first international goals on 5 September 2017 against Chinese Taipei during the 2019 AFC Asian Cup qualification at the Bahrain National Stadium.

==== International goals ====
Scores and results list Bahrain's goal tally first.

No.	Date	Venue	Opponent	Score	Result	Competition
1.	5 September 2017	Bahrain National Stadium, Riffa, Bahrain	Chinese Taipei	3–0	5–0	2019 AFC Asian Cup qualification
2.	5 September 2017	Bahrain National Stadium, Riffa, Bahrain	Chinese Taipei	5–0	5–0	2019 AFC Asian Cup qualification
3.	14 November 2017	National Stadium, Kallang, Singapore	Singapore	1–0	3–0	2019 AFC Asian Cup qualification
4.	14 November 2017	National Stadium, Kallang, Singapore	Singapore	3–0	3–0	2019 AFC Asian Cup qualification
5.	28 May 2021	Bahrain National Stadium, Riffa, Bahrain	Malaysia	1–0	2–0	Friendly
6.	6 October 2021	Bahrain National Stadium, Riffa, Bahrain	Curaçao	3–0	4–0	Friendly
7.	6 October 2021	Bahrain National Stadium, Riffa, Bahrain	Curaçao	4–0	4–0	Friendly
8.	22 January 2022	Bahrain National Stadium, Riffa, Bahrain	Uganda	1–1	3–1	Friendly
9.	27 May 2022	BG Stadium, Thanyaburi, Thailand	Myanmar	1–0	2–0	Friendly
10.	11 June 2024	Zabeel Stadium, Dubai, United Arab Emirates	United Arab Emirates	1–0	1–1	2026 FIFA World Cup qualification
11.	19 November 2024	Bahrain National Stadium, Riffa, Bahrain	Australia	1–1	2–2	2026 FIFA World Cup qualification
12.	19 November 2024	Bahrain National Stadium, Riffa, Bahrain	Australia	2–1	2–2	2026 FIFA World Cup qualification
13.	22 December 2024	Jaber Al-Ahmad International Stadium, Kuwait City, Kuwait	Saudi Arabia	1–0	3–2	26th Arabian Gulf Cup
14	6 December 2025	Khalifa International Stadium, Al Rayyan, Qatar	Algeria	1–1	1–5	2025 FIFA Arab Cup
15	9 December 2025	Education City Stadium, Al Rayyan, Qatar	Sudan	1–0	3–1	2025 FIFA Arab Cup

== Honours ==
=== Club ===
Al-Riffa

- Bahraini Premier League: 2018–19
- Bahraini King's Cup: 2018–19

=== Individual ===
- Topscorer Bahrain League: 2 times.
  - Golden Shoe 2020–21
  - Golden Shoe 2021–22
