= A'Ali SC =

A'Ali
- Full name: A'Ali Cultural & Sports Club
- Founded: 1968; 58 years ago
- Ground: Various
- Chairman: Hassan Mohammed Al-Ali
- Head coach: Vinícius Eutrópio
- League: Premier League
- 2025–26: BPL, 5th of 12
Home colours	Away colours

A'Ali Cultural & Sports Club is a professional football club based in A'ali, a major town in northern Bahrain. The club competes in the Premier League, the top tier of Bahraini football.

== History ==
They first participated professionally in the 2022–23 season in the Second Division. They were promoted to the Premier League for the first time after finishing second in the 2023–24 Second Division. They made their Premier League debut in the 2024–25 season.
