= Al Muharraq Stadium =

Stadium in Arad, Bahrain

- Interactive map of Al Muharraq Stadium
- Location: Arad, Bahrain
- Coordinates: 26°15′28″N 50°37′40″E
- Capacity: 20,000

Tenants
- Muharraq Club; Bahrain SC; Al-Hala SC

Al Muharraq Stadium (Arabic: ملعب المحرق), also known as the Sheikh Ali bin Mohammed Al Khalifa Stadium (Arabic: ملعب الشيخ علي بن محمد آل خليفة), is a multi-use stadium situated in Arad, Bahrain. It is used mostly for football matches and is the home ground of Muharraq Club and Bahrain SC. The stadium holds 20,000 people.

The stadium underwent maintenance works – overseen by Malaysian firm Michael KC Cheah & Partners – for a month during September 2012 to catch up to modern standards.

== History ==
Al Muharraq Stadium is a multi-purpose stadium located in Muharraq, Bahrain. It serves as the home ground of Muharraq Club, one of the most successful football clubs in Bahrain. It has a seating capacity of 20,000 and boasts good facilities, including floodlights, a video scoreboard, and a high-quality turf. Al Muharraq Stadium has hosted numerous high-profile football matches, including AFC Champions League matches and the Arabian Gulf Cup. It is also a popular venue for concerts and other cultural events. The stadium is a source of pride for the people of Muharraq and is widely regarded as one of the best sports facilities in the region.
