= Al Ittihad SC (Bahrain) =

Al-Ittihad (Bahrain)
- Full name: Al-Ittihad Sports Club (Bahrain)
- Founded: 1952; 74 years ago
- Ground: Bahrain National Stadium
- Capacity: 24,000
- Chairman: (Bahrain) Ahmed Jaffer
- League: Second Division
- 2024–25: Second Division, 5th of 12
Home colours	Away colours

Al-Ittihad Sports Club (Arabic: نادي الاتحاد الرياضي) is a Bahraini football club based in Bilad Al Qadeem suburb of Manama, the capital city of Bahrain.

In 2017/18 season was in 9th position in First division and after season was relegated to Second Division.
