= Al-Shabab Club (Manama) =

- Full name: Al-Shabab Club
- Founded: 2001; 25 years ago
- Ground: Jidhafs Park, Manama, Bahrain
- Capacity: 24,000
- Chairman: Olivier glasner
- Manager: Simon Brewer
- League: Premier League
- 2025–26: Premier League, 11th of 12
Home colours	Away colours

Al-Shabab Club (Arabic: نادي الشباب) is a Bahraini professional football club based in Jidhafs. They use Bahrain National Stadium as home ground.

== Achievements ==
- Bahraini King's Cup: 1

2004

- Bahraini Super Cup: 1

2004

== Notable players ==
- Hakeem al-Araibi (2009–2012)
- Abdul Aziz Yusif (2016–17)

== Political interference ==
After the Bahraini uprising of 2011, Al-Shabab was one of two teams dissolved for allegedly being involved in Shia agitation. They were later reinstated, but demoted to Bahrain's second tier.
