= Budaiya Club =

Association football club in Bahrain

Budaiya
- Full name: Budaiya Club
- Ground: Hamad Town Stadium
- Manager: Hisham Al Mahooz
- League: Bahraini Premier League
- 2025–26: 9th of 12
Home colours	Away colours

Budaiya Club (Arabic: نادي البديع) is a football club based in Budaiya, Bahrain, that competes in the Bahraini Premier League. They play their home games at the Hamad Town Stadium, and their home kit is green with white details.

== History ==
Having won the 2017–18 Bahraini Second Division, Budaiya were promoted to the Bahraini Premier League after a 10-year absence from the competition. In 2018–19, they finished in 9th place, and were relegated back to the Second Division. Budaiya finished in second place, and were promoted to the Premier League for the 2020–21 season.

== Players ==
=== 2020 squad ===
As of 15 December 2020

Note: Flags indicate national team as defined under FIFA eligibility rules; some limited exceptions apply. Players may hold more than one non-FIFA nationality.

No.	Pos.	Nation	Player
1	GK	BHR	Saad Al-Dawsari
4	MF	BHR	Sayed Mohamad (captain)
5		BHR	Jassem Rashed
6	MF	BHR	Ali Al Asfoor
7	DF	BHR	Yahya Salman
8	MF	BHR	Jassem Khalif
9	FW	BHR	Ahmed Abed
11		BHR	Salman Ahmad
13	DF	BHR	Sadek Jaafar

No.	Pos.	Nation	Player
13	MF	BRA	Elton Junior
14		BHR	Abdallah Talal
16	FW	NGA	Daniel Israel Nosike
17	MF	BHR	Ahmad Al-Thuini
19	MF	LBN	Yahya El Hindi
21		BHR	Saad Abdelrahman
22	GK	BHR	Mahmood Al Ajimi
24	DF	BHR	Ahmed Yacoub
25	MF	BHR	Abdallah Al-Hayiki
26	DF	BHR	Aziz Shahid

== Honours ==
- Bahraini Second Division
  - Winners (2): 2017–18, 2024–25
