= Malkiya Club =

Malkiya SCC
- Full name: Malkiya Sports and Cultural Club
- Founded: 1968; 58 years ago
- Ground: Madinat 'Isa Stadium, Malkiya
- Capacity: 15,000
- Chairman: Hasan Hassan
- Manager: Ahmed Yaqoob
- League: Premier League
- 2025–26: 4th
Home colours	Away colours

Malkiya SCC (Arabic: نادي المالكية) is a Bahraini professional football club based in Malkiya which plays in Bahraini Premier League.

Malkiya Club after 49 years, became champion of the Bahraini Premier League in 2017.

== Achievements ==
- Bahraini Premier League
  - Champions (1): 2017

== Squad ==
Note: Flags indicate national team as defined under FIFA eligibility rules; some limited exceptions apply. Players may hold more than one non-FIFA nationality.

No.	Pos.	Nation	Player
4	MF	BHR	Ammar Hassan
5	DF	BHR	Sayed Hashem
7	MF	BHR	Isa Abdul Albari
8	MF	YEM	Nawaf Abdullah
10	MF	BHR	Hasan Ali Helal
11	FW	SYR	Esraa Amer
12	DF	BHR	Ali Jasim Mohamed
13	DF	BHR	Ali Ashoor Mohamed

No.	Pos.	Nation	Player
14	MF	BHR	Mohamed Merza
21	MF	BHR	Ali Hameed Abdulla
22	GK	BHR	Yusuf Habib
24	DF	BHR	Sayed Mohamed
26	DF	BHR	Sayed Isa
27	DF	BHR	Ahmed Habib
29	DF	BHR	Ahmed Yusuf

== Continental record ==
Season	Competition	Round	Club	Home	Away	Aggregate
2018	AFC Champions League	Play-off round	(United Arab Emirates) Al-Ain	2–0		
2018	AFC Cup	Group A	(Oman) Al-Suwaiq	4–1	1–2	3rd
2018	AFC Cup	Group A	(Jordan) Al-Jazeera	1–2	1–0	3rd
2018	AFC Cup	Group A	(Iraq) Al-Quwa Al-Jawiya	3–4	1–1	3rd
2019	AFC Cup	Group C	(Oman) Al-Suwaiq	2–2	1–2	2nd
2019	AFC Cup	Group C	(Lebanon) Al-Ahed	0–0	2–1	2nd
2019	AFC Cup	Group C	(Kuwait) Al-Qadsia	1–2	1–2	2nd
