= Al-Hala SC =

Association football club in Bahrain

Al Hala SC
- Full name: Al Hala Sports Club
- Nickname(s): The Orange Castle
- Founded: 1955; 70 years ago
- Ground: Al Muharraq Stadium, Muharraq, Bahrain
- Capacity: 10,000
- Chairman: Jassim Rashdan
- Manager: Mohammad Istanbuli
- League: Bahraini Premier League
- 2024–25: 3rd in Second Division
Home colours	Away colours

Al Hala Sports Club (Arabic: نادي الحالة الرياضي) is a Bahraini professional football and basketball club based in Halat Bu Maher, Muharraq. They play in Bahraini Premier League, the top division in Bahraini football.

== Achievements ==
- Bahraini Premier League: 1

1979

- Bahraini Second Division League: 1

2006

- Bahraini King's Cup: 4

1976, 1980, 1981, 2023
