= Saleh Abdulhameed =

Bahraini footballer (born 1982)

Personal information
- Full name: Saleh Abdulhameed Saleh Mohamed Mahmeedi
- Date of birth: 4 August 1982 (age 44)
- Place of birth: Bahrain
- Position: Centre-back

Team information
- Current team: Busaiteen

Senior career*
Years	Team	Apps	(Gls)
2004–2005	Busaiteen		
2005–2011	Al-Najma		
2007–2008	→ Al-Nasr (loan)		
2009	→ Al-Raed (loan)		
2011–2019	Al-Muharraq		
2019–	Busaiteen		

International career
2010–2015	Bahrain	31	(0)
- * Club domestic league appearances and goals

Saleh Abdulhameed Saleh Mohamed Mahmeedi (Arabic: صالح عبد الحميد صالح محمد محميدي; born 4 August 1982) is a Bahraini professional footballer who plays as a centre-back for Bahraini club Busaiteen Club. He made 31 appearances for the Bahrain national team.

== Club career ==
In the 2005–06 season, Abdelhameed played for Al-Najma. In September 2007, Abdulhameed moved to Kuwaiti club Al-Nasr on loan from Al-Najma. In January 2009, Al-Najma sent him on loan to Al-Raed in Saudi Arabia; Abdulhameed became the first player from Bahrain to play in the Saudi Professional League.

Abdulhameed joined Al-Muharraq in the 2011–12 season, helping them win the 2012 GCC Champions League, Al-Muharraq's first title. He stayed until the 2018–19 season.

Having returned to Busaiteen in the 2019–20 season, Abdulhameed renewed his contract with the team in November 2020, for a further year. His contract was renewed for an additional season once again in mid-2021.

== International career ==
Abdulhameed was due to be called up to the Bahrain national team in 2009, ahead of the 19th Arabian Gulf Cup; however, coach Milan Máčala excluded him from the final list as he was busy with club duty with Al-Nasr that season.

Abdulhameed was included in the 23-man Bahrain roster at the 2011 AFC Asian Cup. He also participated in the 2011 Pan Arab Games, helping Bahrain win their first competition.

== Style of play ==
Abdulhameed was regarded as a promising defender in his youth.

== Career statistics ==
=== International ===
Appearances and goals by national team and year
National team	Year	Apps	Goals
Bahrain	2010	8	0
Bahrain	2011	12	0
Bahrain	2012	6	0
Bahrain	2013	3	0
Bahrain	2014	–	
Bahrain	2015	2	0
Total		31	0

== Honours ==
Al-Najma

- Bahraini King's Cup: 2006, 2007
- Bahraini Super Cup: 2008

Al-Muharraq

- GCC Champions League: 2012
- Bahraini Premier League: 2014–15, 2017–18
- Bahraini King's Cup: 2011, 2012, 2013, 2015–16
- Bahraini Elite Cup: 2019
- Bahraini Super Cup: 2013, 2018

Bahrain

- Pan Arab Games: 2011
