= 2013–14 Bahrain First Division League =

Bahrain First Division League
- Season: 2013–14

The 2013–14 Bahrain First Division League is the 57th edition of top level football in Bahrain. Busaiteen Club are the defending champions. The season started on 15 September.

== Teams ==
Bahrain Club was relegated from the 2012–13 league campaign and replaced by Sitra who were last in the top flight in the 2008–09 league season. Malkiya survived the end of season playoff against East Riffa 2:1 on aggregate

=== Stadia and locations ===
Locations of teams in the 2013–14 Bahraini League

Club	Location	Stadium
Al Hadd	Al Hidd	
Al Hala	Muharraq	Al Muharraq Stadium
Al-Muharraq	Muharraq	Al Muharraq Stadium
Al-Najma SC	Manama	Madinat 'Isa Stadium
Al-Shabab	Manama	Bahrain National Stadium
Bahrain Riffa Club	Riffa	Bahrain National Stadium
Busaiteen Club	Busaiteen	
Malkiya	Malkiya	Madinat 'Isa Stadium
Manama Club	Manama	Bahrain National Stadium
Sitra Club	Sitra	Bahrain National Stadium

- Although most clubs have a stadium, all games are played at the National Stadium, Khalifa Sports City Stadium and Al Ahli Stadium in. Games are usually played as back to back headers.

== League table ==
Pos	Team	Pld	W	D	L	GF	GA	GD	Pts	Qualification or relegation
1	Al-Riffa (C)	18	11	5	2	24	12	+12	38	Qualification to the 2015 AFC Champions League Preliminary Round
2	Manama Club	18	11	4	3	33	16	+17	37	Qualification to the 2015 GCC Champions League Group Stage
3	Al Hadd	18	9	7	2	32	16	+16	34	Qualification to the 2015 AFC Cup Group Stage
4	Al-Muharraq	18	9	7	2	26	15	+11	34	
5	Busaiteen	18	6	4	8	27	26	+1	22	
6	Al Hala	18	4	8	6	21	20	+1	20	
7	Malkiya	18	5	5	8	18	24	−6	20	
8	Al-Shabab Manama	18	3	8	7	18	26	−8	17	
9	Al-Najma SC	18	2	7	9	15	29	−14	13	Relegation
10	Sitra Club	18	1	3	14	14	45	−31	6	Relegation

Updated to match(es) played on 1 June 2014. Source: Fudbal91
Rules for classification: 1) points; 2) goal difference; 3) number of goals scored.
(C) Champions
