= 2015–16 Bahraini King's Cup =

Tournament details
- Country: Bahrain
- Teams: 19

Final positions
- Champions: Muharraq
- Runners-up: Riffa S.C.

Tournament statistics
- Matches played: 24

The Bahraini King's Cup is a cup competition involving teams from the Bahraini Premier League and 2nd tier. Hidd SCC are the current holders of the King's Cup, having defeated Busaiteen in extra time in last year's final.

== Draw ==
The official draw took place on 24 December 2015.

== Preliminary round ==
3 teams played a knockout tie. 3 ties were played over one leg. The first match was played between Al-Shabab and Isa Town Club on 28 December 2015. Al-Shabab, Al-Ittihad Bahrain and Qalali Club advanced to the Round of 16 after winning their respective ties.

2015-12-28
18:30 (GMT+3)

Al-Shabab	2 - 1	Isa Town Club
Sayyed Ibrahim Alawi 79'; Mohammad Jameel 90+1'		Hamad Al-Rumaihi 12'

Al-Ahli Stadium
Referee: Abdulshahid Abdulamir (BHR)

2015-12-28
18:30 (GMT+3)

Al-Ittihad	2 - 0	Tadamun Buri
Mohammad Jawad 51'; Mahdi Abduljabbar 72'

Hamad Town Stadium
Referee: Osama Idris (BHR)

2015-12-28
18:30 (GMT+3)

Al-Ittifaq	0 - 1	Qalali
		Qassem Hassan 37'

Al-Najma Stadium
Referee: Sayyed Adnan Mohammad (BHR)

== Round of 16 ==
The round of 16 had the 3 winners from the previous round, alongside 13 new entrants: 10 from the First Division and 3 from the Second Division. The draw was made 24 December 2015 with the preliminary round draw. 8 teams advanced from this round into the Quarterfinals. The draw for the upcoming rounds was also made on the same day as the preliminary round draw.

2016-01-18
19:00 (GMT+3)

Qalali	0 - 9	Malkiya
		Ali Al-Sayyed Essa 15', 28', 53', 66'; Sayyed Redha Essa 24', 55'; Mohammad Darwish 38'; Jassim Mohammad 42'; Seydou Kalo Balo 45'

Hamad Town Stadium
Referee: Osama Idris (BHR)

2016-01-18
19:00 (GMT+3)

Sitra	0 - 3	Al-Hidd
		Mohammad Al-Rumaihi 52', 60', 74'

Bahrain National Stadium
Referee: Ali Hassan Al-Samahiji (BHR)

2016-01-19
19:00 (GMT+3)

East Riffa Club	1 - 1 (a.e.t.)	Manama
Ala'a Hubail 105'		Mladen Jovancic 109' (pen.)
Penalties
Mladen Jovancic (penalty missed); Abdulla Yousif (penalty missed); Faisal Bodahoom (penalty scored); Leith Hashem (penalty scored)	2-4	(penalty scored) Ringo; (penalty scored) Ala'a Hubail; (penalty scored) Djelaludin Sharityar; (penalty scored) Mohammad Essa

Bahrain National Stadium
Referee: Nawaf Shukrallah (BHR)

2016-01-19
19:00 (GMT+3)

Budaiya Club	1 - 2 (a.e.t.)	Al-Najma
Samuel Al-Sar 64'		Ahmad Mohammad Abdulrasoul 59'; Abdulrahman Yousif 103'

Hamad Town Stadium

2016-01-20
19:00 (GMT+3)

Bahrain Club	1 - 0 (a.e.t.)	Busaiteen Club
Tiago 120' (pen.)

Hamad Town Stadium
Referee: Jameel Juma (BHR)

2016-01-20
19:00 (GMT+3)

Al Hala Club	1 - 4	Al-Ahli
Mahdi Baqer 60' (o.g.)		Diego Pelicles da Silva 10', 16'; Clieton 38'; Dia Salman 83'

Bahrain National Stadium
Referee: Ammar Mahfouz (BHR)

2016-01-21
19:00 (GMT+3)

Al-Shabab	0 - 5	Muharraq
		Felipinho 24'; Ismail Abdullatif 47', 56' (pen.); Abdulla Abdo 38'; Admir Catovic 38'

Hamad Town Stadium
Referee: Saleh Al-Abbasy (BHR)

2016-01-21
19:00 (GMT+3)

Al-Ittihad	0 - 4	Riffa
		Essa Ghaleb 11'; Komail Al-Aswad 69'; Abdulla Al-Zayed 76'; Mohammed Al-Tayeb 83'

Bahrain National Stadium
Referee: Waleed Mahmoud (BHR)

== Quarter finals ==
4 teams advanced from this round into the Semifinals.

2016-01-30
18:00 (GMT+3)

Malkiya	0 - 0 (a.e.t.)	Al-Ahli
	Report
Penalties
Ali Al-Sayyed Essa (penalty scored); Essa Abdulwahab Al-Beri (penalty missed); Sayyed Hashem Adnan (penalty scored); Mohammad Darwish (penalty missed); Hussein Khalaf (penalty scored); Nawaf Abdulla (penalty scored); Jassim Mohammad (penalty missed)	4-5	(penalty scored) Patrick Uche; (penalty scored) Jassim Al-Sheikh; (penalty scored) Diego Pelicles da Silva; (penalty missed) Hani Al-Badrani; (penalty missed) Imad Zatara; (penalty scored) Hassan Ishaq; (penalty scored) Mahdi Baqer

Khalifa Sports City Stadium
Referee: Abdulshaheed Abdulamir (BHR)

2016-01-30
18:00 (GMT+3)

Manama	2 - 6	Muharraq
Mahmood Abdulrahman 34' (pen.) 42'	Report	Ismail Abdullatif 25'; Saleh Abdulhameed 36'; Kanu 45+1', 68'; Felipinho 55', 90+2'

Bahrain National Stadium

2016-01-31
18:00 (GMT+3)

Al-Hidd	0 - 2	Riffa
	Report	Mohammed Al-Tayeb 57'; Sayed Mohamed Adnan 64' (o.g.)

Khalifa Sports City Stadium
Referee: Nawaf Shukrallah (BHR)

2016-01-31
18:00 (GMT+3)

Bahrain Club	1 - 3	Al-Najma
Thiago de Souza 94'	Report	Ali Yaqoub Al-Dossary 53'; Saad Al Amer 77', 83'

Bahrain National Stadium
Referee: Abdulla Qassem (BHR)

== Semi finals ==
The two winners from this round progressed to meet in the final.

2016-02-19
19:00 (GMT+3)

Al-Najma	1 - 6	Muharraq
Saleh Abdulhameed 80' (o.g.)	Report	Ismail Abdullatif 49'; Abdulla Abdo 52', 70'; Ebrahim Al Mishkhas 58'; Admir Catovic 79'; Shohrux Gadoyev 89'

Khalifa Sports City Stadium
Referee: Abdulshaheed Abdulamir (BHR)

2016-02-20
19:00 (GMT+3)

Al-Ahli	1 - 2	Riffa
Diego Pelicles da Silva 28'	Report	Mahmoud Maowas 4'; Ahmad Al Douni 64'

Khalifa Sports City Stadium
Referee: Abdulla Qassem (BHR)

== Final ==
2016-03-03
19:15 (GMT+3)

Muharraq	3 - 1	Riffa
Abdulla Abdo 24'; Ali Jamal 89'; Jamal Rashid 90+1'	Report	Mahmoud Maowas 37'

Bahrain National Stadium
Attendance: 10,000
Referee: Waleed Mahmoud (BHR)
