= 2022–23 Bahraini King's Cup =

Tournament details
- Country: Bahrain
- Dates: 19 September 2022 – 7 April 2023
- Teams: 24

Final positions
- Champions: Al-Hala
- Runners-up: Al-Ahli

Tournament statistics
- Matches played: 23
- Goals scored: 35 (1.52 per match)

The 2022–23 Bahraini King's Cup was the 21st season of the Bahraini King's Cup, the national football cup competition of Bahrain since it was renamed as the King's Cup in 2003 (named Emir Cup or Federation Cup before).

== First preliminary round ==
Team 1	Score	Team 2
Isa Town (2)	1–1 (4–2 p)	A'Ali (2)
Busaiteen (2)	2–1	Umm Al-Hassam (2)
Al-Tadamun (2)	0–0 (3–0 p)	Etehad Al-Reef (2)
Qalali (2)	3–0	Buri (2)

== Second preliminary round ==
Team 1	Score	Team 2
Sitra (1)	1–0	Qalali (2)
Malkiya (2)	0–2	Busaiteen (2)
Al-Ittifaq Maqaba (2)	1–1 (6–5 p)	Isa Town (2)
Al-Ittihad (2)	1–1 (3–4 p)	Al-Tadamun (2)

== Round of 16 ==
Team 1	Score	Team 2
Al-Riffa (1)	3–0	Al-Ittifaq Maqaba (2)
Al-Ahli (1)	4–0	Al-Shabab (1)
Al-Muharraq (1)	2–0	Busaiteen (2)
Budaiya (1)	0–0 (1–3 p)	Al-Najma (2)
Manama (1)	2–0	Bahrain SC (1)
Al-Khaldiya (1)	0–0 (2–4 p)	Sitra (1)
Al-Hala (1)	2–0	Al-Tadamun (2)
East Riffa (1)	0–1	Al-Hidd (1)

== Quarter-finals ==
Team 1	Score	Team 2
Al-Muharraq (1)	0–0 (a.e.t.) (0–3 p)	Al-Riffa (1)
Al-Ahli (1)	1–1 (a.e.t.) (4–2 p)	Al-Najma (2)
Manama (1)	1–1 (a.e.t.) (5–4 p)	Sitra (1)
Al-Hala (1)	1–1 (a.e.t.) (4–2 p)	Al-Hidd (1)

== Semi-finals ==
Team 1	Score	Team 2
Al-Riffa (1)	2–2 (a.e.t.) (1–4 p)	Al-Ahli (1)
Manama (1)	1–2 (a.e.t.)	Al-Hala (1)

== Final ==
7 April 2023
20:45

Al-Ahli	0–0 (a.e.t.)	Al-Hala
	Report
Penalties
Penalty scored Penalty missed	5–6	Penalty scored Penalty missed

Khalifa Sports City Stadium, Manama
