= 2013 Bahraini King's Cup =

Tournament details
- Country: Bahrain
- Teams: 18

Final positions
- Champions: Al-Muharraq SC
- Runners-up: Rffa Club

The Bahraini King's Cup is a cup competition involving teams from the Bahraini Premier League and 2nd tier. Al-Muharraq SC are the current holders of the King's Cup, having defeated their arch-rivals Riffa S.C. 3-1 in last year's final. They have won four of the past five editions of the tournament, with Riffa claiming the crown in between in 2010.

== Draw ==
The official draw took place on 7 February 2013.

The results of the draw were:

- Current champions Muharraq face Al Shabab.
- Al-Najma take on Hidd SCC.
- Al Ahli club face Al Ittihad.
- Busaiteen Club play against Al Tadamun Buri, who beat Qalali to enter the tournament.
- Malkiya Club face the Bahrain Club.
- Al Hala take on East Riffa Club.
- Manama Club play against Budaiya Club
- Rffa Club take on Isa Town Club.

=== Organisation ===
The opening phases of the cup took place on 22 and 26 February 2013. The quarter-finals took place on March 26 and 27, followed by the semi-finals on April 14. The final took place on April 18, with the king, Hamad bin Isa Al-Khalifa attending the match.

== Preliminary round ==
The winners of the preliminary round qualify for the last 16 elimination round of the tournament.

2013-02-06
18:00 (GMT+3)

Qalali	1 – 3	Tadamun Buri
	Match report

Khalifa Sports City Stadium

2013-02-06
18:00 (GMT+3)

Budaiya	2 – 1	Ittifaq Maqaba
	Match report

Al Ahli Stadium

== Round one ==
2013-02-22
16:45 (GMT+3)

Al Hala Muharraq	0 – 3	East Riffa
	Match report

Al Ahli Stadium

2013-02-22
16:45 (GMT+3)

Al Najma	0 – 2	Al Hadd
	Match report

Bahrain National Stadium

2013-02-23
18:00 (GMT+3)

Muharraq	3 – 1	Al-Shabab
	Match report

Al Ahli Stadium

2013-02-23
18:00 (GMT+3)

Isa Town Club	1 – 5	Rffa Club
	Match report

Khalifa Sports City Stadium

2013-02-24
18:00 (GMT+3)

Busaiteen Club	2 – 0	Al Tadamun Buri
	Match report

Bahrain National Stadium

2013-02-24
18:00 (GMT+3)

Manama Club	4 – 1	Budaiya Club
	Match report

Khalifa Sports City Stadium

2013-02-25
18:00 (GMT+3)

Al Ahli Club	2 – 2 0:1 pens	Al Ittihad
	Match report

Khalifa Sports City Stadium

2013-02-25
18:00 (GMT+3)

Bahrain Club	0 – 1	Malkiya Club
	Match report

Al Ahli stadium

== Quarter-finals ==
2013-03-26
18:30 (GMT+3)

Al Ittihad	1 - 2	Busaiteen Club

Khalifa Sports City Stadium

2013-03-26
18:30 (GMT+3)

Al-Muharraq SC	2 - 0	Al Hadd

Bahrain National Stadium

2013-03-27
18:30 (GMT+3)

Malkiya Club	2 - 1	East Riffa Club

Khalifa Sports City Stadium

2013-03-27
18:30 (GMT+3)

Manama Club	0 - 3	Rffa Club

Bahrain National Stadium

== Semi-finals ==
2013-04-14
18:30 (GMT+3)

Al-Muharraq SC	2 - 0	Busaiteen Club

Khalifa Sports City Stadium

2013-04-14
18:30 (GMT+3)

Malkiya Club	1 - 4	Rffa Club

Al Ahli Stadium

== Final ==
2013-04-18
18:00 (GMT+3)

Al-Muharraq SC	2 - 2 (a.e.t.)	Rffa Club
Penalties
	4 - 3

Bahrain National Stadium
