= 2012–13 Bahrain First Division League =

Bahrain First Division League
- Season: 2012–13
- Champions: Busaiteen
- AFC Cup: Busaiteen; Al-Muharraq

The 2012–13 Bahrain First Division League is the 56th edition of top level football in Bahrain. Bahrain Riffa Club are the defending champions. The season started on 21 September.

== Teams ==
East Riffa Club and Al Ahli were relegated from the 2011–12 league campaign and replaced by both Al-Shabab and Malkiya who were last in the top flight in the 2010–11 league season of which they both withdrew from.

=== Stadia and locations ===
Locations of teams in the 2012–13 Bahraini League

Club	Location	Stadium
Al Hadd	Al Hidd	
Al Hala	Muharraq	Al Muharraq Stadium
Al-Muharraq	Muharraq	Al Muharraq Stadium
Al-Najma SC	Manama	Madinat 'Isa Stadium
Al-Shabab	Manama	Bahrain National Stadium
Bahrain Club	Muharraq	Al Muharraq Stadium
Bahrain Riffa Club	Riffa	Bahrain National Stadium
Busaiteen Club	Busaiteen	
Malkiya	Malkiya	Madinat 'Isa Stadium
Manama Club	Manama	Bahrain National Stadium

- Although most clubs have a stadium, most games are played at the National Stadium. Games are normally played as back to back headers.

== League table ==
Pos	Team	Pld	W	D	L	GF	GA	GD	Pts	Qualification or relegation
1	Busaiteen	18	14	2	2	44	12	+32	44	2013 AFC Cup Group stage
2	Al-Muharraq	18	13	3	2	41	11	+30	42	2013 AFC Cup Group stage
3	Al Hadd	18	12	1	5	38	19	+19	37	
4	Al-Riffa	18	8	4	6	24	24	0	28	
5	Manama Club	18	6	5	7	36	31	+5	23	
6	Al-Najma SC	18	7	4	7	18	30	−12	22 (Note: Al Najma were deducted 3 points)	
7	Al Hala	18	4	4	10	26	33	−7	16	
8	Al-Shabab Manama	18	3	4	11	22	38	−16	13	
9	Malkiya	18	3	4	11	18	35	−17	13	Relegation Playoff
10	Bahrain Club	18	2	5	11	24	59	−35	11	Relegation

Updated to match(es) played on 1 June 2013. Source: Soccerway
Rules for classification: 1) points; 2) goal difference; 3) number of goals scored.

== Promotion/relegation play-off ==
Team 1	Agg.	Team 2	1st leg	2nd leg
Malkiya	2–1	East Riffa	1–0	1–1
