= 2015 Bahraini King's Cup =

Tournament details
- Country: Bahrain
- Teams: 19

Final positions
- Champions: Al Hidd
- Runners-up: Busaiteen Club

Tournament statistics
- Matches played: 18
- Goals scored: 67 (3.72 per match)

The Bahraini King's Cup is a cup competition involving teams from the Bahraini Premier League and 2nd tier. East Riffa are the current holders of the King's Cup, having defeated Busaiteen in extra time in last year's final. The data is an assessment of how the outcome of the games during the 2015 Bahraini King's Cup.

== Draw ==
The official draw took place on 25 December 2014.

== Preliminary round ==
The winners of the preliminary round qualify for the last 16 elimination round of the tournament.

2015-01-26
18:00 (GMT+3)

Qalali	3 - 2	Al Ittihad

2015-01-26
18:00 (GMT+3)

Ittifaq Maqaba	0 - 5	Tadamun Buri

2015-01-26
18:00 (GMT+3)

Isa Town Club	1 – 1 (a.e.t.)	Budaiya
Penalties
	4–3

== 1st round ==
2015-01-30
18:00 (GMT+3)

Bahrain Club	0 - 2	Muharraq

2015-01-30
18:00 (GMT+3)

Al Najma	5 - 0	Tadamun Buri

2015-01-30
18:00 (GMT+3)

East Riffa	2 – 2 (a.e.t.)	Busaiteen Club
Penalties
	3–4

2015-01-30
18:00 (GMT+3)

Al Ahli Club	2 - 3 (a.e.t.)	Manama Club

2015-01-31
18:00 (GMT+3)

Al Hala	1 - 2	Isa Town Club

2015-01-31
18:00 (GMT+3)

Malkiya Club	1 - 3 (a.e.t.)	Al Hidd

2015-01-31
18:00 (GMT+3)

Qalali	2 - 4	Al-Shabab

2015-01-31
18:00 (GMT+3)

Sitra Club	1 – 1 (a.e.t.)	Rffa Club
Penalties
	1–3

== Quarter finals ==
2015-02-20
18:00 (GMT+3)

Busaiteen Club	5 - 1 (a.e.t.)	Al Najma

2015-02-20
18:00 (GMT+3)

Muharraq	3 - 1	Manama Club

2015-02-21
18:00 (GMT+3)

Al Hidd	4 - 0	Al-Shabab

2015-02-21
18:00 (GMT+3)

Isa Town Club	1 - 3	Rffa Club

== Semi finals ==
2015-03-06
18:15 (GMT+3)

Muharraq	1 - 1 (a.e.t.)	Busaiteen Club
Penalties
	4–5

2015-03-06
21:25 (GMT+3)

Al Hidd	2 - 0	Rffa Club

== Final ==
2015-04-05
18:30 (GMT+3)

Al Hidd	2 - 0	Busaiteen Club
	Report
