= Jamal Rashid =

Bahraini footballer

Personal information
- Full name: Jamal Rashid Abdulrahman Yusuf
- Date of birth: 7 November 1988 (age 38)
- Place of birth: Muharraq, Bahrain
- Height: 1.68 m (5 ft 6 in)
- Position: Left winger

Team information
- Current team: Al-Muharraq
- Number: 19

Youth career
- 2000–2006: Al-Ahli

Senior career*
Years	Team	Apps	(Gls)
2006–2011	Al-Ahli	?	(7)
2010	→ Riffa (Loan)	?	(0)
2011–2012	Dhofar	?	(0)
2012–2013	Al-Ahli	?	(2)
2013–2014	Al-Nahda	?	(7)
2014–	Al-Muharraq		(7)

International career^{‡}
2007–	Bahrain	42	(9)
- * Club domestic league appearances and goals ‡ National team caps and goals as of 22 January 2019

Jamal Rashid Abdulrahman Yusuf (Arabic: جَمَال رَاشِد عَبْد الرَّحْمٰن يُوسُف; born 7 November 1988), commonly known as Jamal Rashid, is a Bahraini footballer who plays for Al-Muharraq SC in the Bahraini Premier League.

== Club career ==
Jamal began his professional career in 2005 with Al-Ahli (Manama). He scored six goals in his four-seasons spell at the club. He helped his team to reach the finals of the 2005 Bahraini Crown Prince Cup and 2006 Bahraini King's Cup, finish at the second position in the 2005–06 Bahraini Premier League, reach the finals of the 2007 Bahraini FA Cup and 2008 Bahraini Crown Prince Cup. Then in 2009, he moved to Riffa S.C. where he helped his team to reach the finals of the 2009 Bahraini Crown Prince Cup and 2009 Bahraini King's Cup, win the 2010 Bahraini King's Cup and finish at the second position in the 2010–11 Bahrain First Division League.

After spending a long four-seasons spell in Bahrain with Al-Ahli and Riffa S.C., he moved to Oman in 2011 and signed a one-year contract with Omani giants Dhofar S.C.S.C. He helped his team to win the 2012 Omani Federation Cup and finish as the runner-up of the 2012 Omani Super Cup.

He came back to Bahrain in 2012 and signed a one-year contract with one of his former clubs, Al-Ahli.

On 13 July 2013, he came back to Oman and signed a one-year contract with Al-Nahda Club. He helped his team to reach the finals of the 2012 Sultan Qaboos Cup.

On 1 June 2014, he came back to Bahrain and signed a four-seasons contract with Al-Muharraq SC.

== Career statistics ==
=== Club ===
Club	Season	Division	League		Cup		Continental		Other		Total	
Club	Season	Division	Apps	Goals	Apps	Goals	Apps	Goals	Apps	Goals	Apps	Goals
Al-Ahli	2007–08	Bahraini Premier League	-	1	-	3	0	0	-	0	-	4
Al-Ahli	2008–09	Bahraini Premier League	-	4	-	2	0	0	-	0	-	6
Al-Ahli	2009–10	Bahraini Premier League	-	2	-	0	0	0	-	0	-	6
Al-Ahli	2011–12	Bahraini Premier League	-	2	-	0	0	0	-	0	-	2
Al-Ahli	Total		-	9	-	5	0	0	-	0	-	14
Dhofar	2011–12	Oman Elite League	-	0	-	1	0	0	-	0	-	1
Dhofar	Total		-	0	-	1	0	0	-	0	-	1
Al-Nahda	2012–13	Oman Professional League	-	6	-	1	0	0	-	0	-	7
Al-Nahda	2013–14	Oman Professional League	-	2	-	0	0	0	-	0	-	2
Al-Nahda	Total		-	8	-	1	0	0	-	0	-	9
Career total			-	17	-	6	0	0	-	0	-	24

=== International ===
Scores and results list Bahrain's goal tally first.

#	Date	Venue	Opponent	Score	Result	Competition
1.	23 January 2008	Bahrain National Stadium, Riffa, Bahrain	Syria	1–1	1–2	Friendly
2.	14 November 2017	National Stadium, Kallang, Singapore	Singapore	2–0	3–0	2019 AFC Asian Cup qualification
3.	23 December 2017	Al Kuwait Sports Club Stadium, Kuwait	Iraq	1–0	1–1	23rd Arabian Gulf Cup
4.	26 December 2017	Al Kuwait Sports Club Stadium, Kuwait	Yemen	1–0	1–0	23rd Arabian Gulf Cup
5.	16 October 2018	Bahrain National Stadium, Riffa, Bahrain	Myanmar	1–0	4–1	Friendly
6.	20 December 2018	Khalifa Sports City Stadium, Isa Town, Bahrain	Tajikistan	2–0	5–0	Friendly
7.	20 December 2018	Khalifa Sports City Stadium, Isa Town, Bahrain	Tajikistan	4–0	5–0	Friendly
8.	29 December 2018	Khalifa Sports City Stadium, Isa Town, Bahrain	North Korea	3–0	4–0	Friendly
9.	14 January 2019	Sharjah Stadium, Sharjah, United Arab Emirates	India	1–0	1–0	2019 AFC Asian Cup

== Honours ==
- With Al-Ahli
  - Bahraini Premier League (0): Runner-up 2005–06
  - Bahraini Crown Prince Cup (0): Runner-up 2005, 2008 Bahraini Crown Prince Cup
  - Bahraini King's Cup (0): Runner-up 2006
  - Bahraini FA Cup (1): 2007
- With Dhofar
  - Omani Federation Cup (1): 2012
  - Omani Super Cup (0): Runner-up 2012
- With Al-Nahda
  - Oman Professional League (1): 2013-14
  - Sultan Qaboos Cup (0): Runner-up 2012, 2013
