= 2014 Bahraini King's Cup =

Tournament details
- Country: Bahrain

Final positions
- Champions: East Riffa
- Runners-up: Busaiteen

The Bahraini King's Cup is a cup competition involving teams from the Bahraini Premier League and the Bahraini Second Division. Al-Muharraq SC are the current holders of the King's Cup, having defeated their arch-rivals Riffa S.C. on penalties in last year's final. They have won five of the past six editions of the tournament, with Riffa claiming the crown in between in 2010.

== Draw ==
The official draw took place on 19 December 2013.

== Preliminary round ==
The winners of the preliminary round qualify for the last 16 elimination round of the tournament.

2014-01-09
18:00 (GMT+3)

Tadamun Buri	1 - 3	Al Ittihad

2014-01-10
18:00 (GMT+3)

Qalali	1 – 2 (a.e.t.)	Ittifaq Maqaba

2014-01-10
18:00 (GMT+3)

Isa Town Club	0 – 0 (a.e.t.)	Budaiya
Penalties
	4–3

== 1st round ==
2014-01-21
18:00 (GMT+3)

Al Hala	5 - 1	Isa Town Club

2014-01-21
18:00 (GMT+3)

Al-Shabab	5 – 0	Ittifaq Maqaba

2014-01-22
18:00 (GMT+3)

Bahrain Club	0 – 4	Manama Club

2014-01-23
18:00 (GMT+3)

Al Ittihad	2 – 2 (a.e.t.)	Busaiteen Club
Penalties
	0–3

2014-01-24
18:00 (GMT+3)

East Riffa	1 - 0	Rffa Club

2014-01-24
18:00 (GMT+3)

Muharraq	1 - 0	Al Ahli Club

2014-01-25
18:00 (GMT+3)

Malkiya Club	2 - 1	Sitra Club

2014-01-25
18:00 (GMT+3)

Al Hadd	2 - 3 (a.e.t.)	Al Najma

== Quarter finals ==
2014-02-19
18:00 (GMT+3)

Malkiya Club	0 - 1	Busaiteen Club

2014-02-20
18:00 (GMT+3)

East Riffa	2 – 2 (a.e.t.)	Muharraq
Penalties
	5–3

2014-02-21
18:00 (GMT+3)

Al Najma	3 – 2 (a.e.t.)	Al Hala

2014-02-22
18:00 (GMT+3)

Manama Club	2 – 3	Al-Shabab

== Semi finals ==
2014-03-23
18:20 (GMT+3)

Al Najma	2 - 4	Busaiteen Club

2014-03-24
18:20 (GMT+3)

East Riffa	1 - 0	Al-Shabab

== Final ==
2014-03-28
18:20 (GMT+3)

East Riffa	2 - 1 (a.e.t.)	Busaiteen Club
