= 2011–12 Bahrain First Division League =

Bahrain First Division League
- Season: 2011–12
- Champions: Bahrain Riffa Club
- AFC Cup: Bahrain Riffa Club; Al-Muharraq

The 2011–12 Bahrain First Division League is the 55th edition of top-level football in Bahrain. Al-Muharraq are the defending champions. The season started on 1 December after numerous postponements to the original fixture list and finished on 4 June with the relegation/promotion playoff match.

== Teams ==
The 2010–11 league campaign was heavily disrupted by the Bahraini uprising in February and a number of games were cancelled or awarded to the opposition team. As it became clear that the league would struggle to continue with the number of postponements, it appeared that Al-Shabab and Malkiya either withdrew from the championship or suspended from the championship which resulted in automatic relegation.

These relegated clubs were replaced by East Riffa Club, returning after one season away from the top flight and Bahrain Club who return for the first time since the 2008–09 Bahrain Classification Soccer League season.

=== Stadia and locations ===
Locations of teams in the 2011–12 Bahraini League

Club	Location	Stadium
Al Ahli	Manama	Al Ahli Stadium
Al Hidd	Al Hidd	
Al Hala	Muharraq	Al Muharraq Stadium
Al-Muharraq	Muharraq	Al Muharraq Stadium
Al-Najma SC	Manama	Madinat 'Isa Stadium
Bahrain Riffa Club	Riffa	Bahrain National Stadium
Busaiteen Club	Busaiteen	
East Riffa Club	Manama	Al Ahli Stadium
Bahrain Club	Muharraq	Al Muharraq Stadium
Manama Club	Manama	Bahrain National Stadium

- Although most clubs do have a stadium, most are played at the National Stadium. Games are usually played as back to back headers.

== League table ==
Pos	Team	Pld	W	D	L	GF	GA	GD	Pts	Qualification or relegation
1	Al-Riffa	18	14	3	1	34	16	+18	45	2013 AFC Cup Group stage
2	Al-Muharraq (Note: Al-Muharraq qualified as winners of 2012 Bahraini King's Cup.)	18	12	2	4	41	13	+28	38	2013 AFC Cup Group stage
3	Busaiteen	18	10	4	4	34	25	+9	34	
4	Hidd SCC	18	5	7	6	23	26	−3	22	
5	Al-Najma SC	18	6	3	9	24	24	0	21	
6	Al Hala	18	6	3	9	29	33	−4	21	
7	Manama Club	18	6	2	10	20	29	−9	20	
8	Bahrain Club	18	5	4	9	23	29	−6	19	
9	Al-Ahli Manama	18	5	3	10	16	28	−12	18	Relegation Playoff
10	East Riffa Club	18	4	3	11	19	36	−17	15	Relegation

Updated to match(es) played on 27 May 2012. Source: Soccerway
Rules for classification: 1) points; 2) goal difference; 3) number of goals scored.

== Promotion/relegation play-off ==
Team 1	Agg.	Team 2	1st leg	2nd leg
Al Ahli	3-4	Malkiya	2-0	1-4

== Fixtures and results ==
Home \ Away	AHL	HID	HLA	MHR	NJM	BHR	BRC	BUS	ERC	MNM
Al-Ahli Manama		1–0	1–0	1–1	2–1	0–0	0–1	1–4	0–1	4–1
Hidd SCC			1–1	0–1	1–0	0–4	2–2	1–1	4–2	
Al Hala		2–5		0–2	2–1	2–0	1–2	1–2		2–1
Al-Muharraq	2–0	0–0	6–1		3–1	3–0	1–2	1–2	3–0	2–1
Al-Najma SC	3–2	3–1	1–1	0–1		1–0	1–2	4–0	1–0	2–3
Bahrain Club	0–1	2–2	2–1	1–5	2–0		2–4	1–2	3–0	2–2
Al-Riffa	2–0	1–0	2–2	2–0	4–3	1–0		1–1	1–0	2–0
Busaiteen	5–1	3–1	1–5	0–2	1–0	4–2	0–2		2–2	4–2
East Riffa Club	3–0	2–3	2–1	0–7	1–1	1–3	2–3	1–1		1–2
Manama Club	1–0	1–1	1–3	2–1	0–1	0–1	1–0	1–2	1–0	

Updated to match(es) played on 27 May 2012. Source: Soccerway
Legend: Blue = home team win; Yellow = draw; Red = away team win.
