= 2022–23 Bahraini FA Cup =

Tournament details
- Country: Bahrain
- Dates: 23 September 2022 – 27 March 2023
- Teams: 24

Final positions
- Champions: Manama
- Runners-up: Al-Khaldiya

Tournament statistics
- Matches played: 63
- Goals scored: 204 (3.24 per match)

The 2022–23 Bahraini FA Cup was the 16th season of the Bahraini FA Cup, the national football federation cup of Bahrain.

== Group stage ==
=== Group 1 ===
Pos	Team	Pld	W	D	L	GF	GA	GD	Pts	Qualification or relegation
1	Al-Hidd	5	4	1	0	13	4	+9	13	Advance to semi-finals
2	Al-Riffa	5	3	2	0	16	10	+6	11	
3	A'Ali	5	2	1	2	8	10	−2	7	
4	Al-Ittihad	5	2	0	3	8	9	−1	6	
5	Budaiya	5	1	0	4	4	8	−4	3	
6	Isa Town	5	1	0	4	7	15	−8	3	

Source: Soccerway
Rules for classification: Points, Goal difference, Goals scored, Head-to-head points, Head-to-head goal difference, Head-to-head goals scored

23 September 2022 1	Al-Riffa	2–1	Budaiya	Bahrain
18:45	37'; 58' (pen.)	Report	74'

23 September 2022 1	Al-Hidd	3–0	Al-Ittihad	Bahrain
18:45		Report

23 September 2022 1	A'Ali	3–2	Isa Town	Bahrain
18:45	26'; 54'; 60'	Report	22'; 51'

4 November 2022 2	Budaiya	0–3	Al-Hidd	Bahrain
17:30		Report

4 November 2022 2	Al-Ittihad	4–1	A'Ali	Bahrain
17:30	19'; 49' (pen.); 77'; 83'	Report	36'

5 November 2022 2	Al-Riffa	5–2	Isa Town	Bahrain
17:30	5' (pen.); 9'; 51'; 60' (pen.); 90+1'	Report	45+1'; 47'

13 November 2022 3	Isa Town	2–1	Budaiya	Bahrain
17:30		Report

13 November 2022 3	Al-Ittihad	1–3	Al-Riffa	Bahrain
17:30		Report

13 November 2022 3	A'Ali	0–1	Al-Hidd	Bahrain
17:30		Report

14 January 2023 4	Al-Hidd	3–3	Al-Riffa	Bahrain
18:00		Report

15 January 2023 4	Al-Ittihad	3–0	Isa Town	Bahrain
18:00	33'; 47'; 52'	Report

15 January 2023 4	Budaiya	0–1	A'Ali	Bahrain
18:00		Report	85' (pen.)

19 March 2023 5	Isa Town	1–3	Al-Hidd	Bahrain
18:30		Report

20 March 2023 5	Budaiya	2–0	Al-Ittihad	Bahrain
18:30	14'; 17'	Report

20 March 2023 5	A'Ali	3–3	Al-Riffa	Bahrain
18:30		Report

=== Group 2 ===
Pos	Team	Pld	W	D	L	GF	GA	GD	Pts	Qualification or relegation
1	Manama	5	5	0	0	17	2	+15	15	Advance to semi-finals
2	Al-Ahli	5	3	1	1	9	3	+6	10	
3	Busaiteen	5	3	0	2	10	11	−1	9	
4	Etehad Al-Reef	5	2	1	2	7	11	−4	7	
5	Al-Najma	5	1	0	4	6	11	−5	3	
6	Al-Ittifaq Maqaba	5	0	0	5	4	15	−11	0	

Source: Soccerway
Rules for classification: Points, Goal difference, Goals scored, Head-to-head points, Head-to-head goal difference, Head-to-head goals scored

23 September 2022 1	Manama	1–0	Al-Ahli	Bahrain
18:45	39'	Report

23 September 2022 1	Al-Najma	2–1	Al-Ittifaq Maqaba	Bahrain
18:45	18'; 20'	Report	47'

23 September 2022 1	Etehad Al-Reef	0–2	Busaiteen	Bahrain
18:45		Report

4 November 2022 2	Al-Ahli	2–0	Al-Najma	Bahrain
17:30	39'; 70'	Report

4 November 2022 2	Manama	4–0	Busaiteen	Bahrain
17:30		Report

4 November 2022 2	Al-Ittifaq Maqaba	2–4	Etehad Al-Reef	Bahrain
17:30		Report

13 November 2022 3	Etehad Al-Reef	2–1	Al-Najma	Bahrain
17:30		Report

13 November 2022 3	Busaiteen	1–5	Al-Ahli	Bahrain
17:30		Report

13 November 2022 3	Al-Ittifaq Maqaba	0–4	Manama	Bahrain
17:30		Report

11 January 2023 4	Al-Najma	2–3	Manama	Bahrain
18:00	14'; 74' (pen.)	Report	7'; 41'; 65'

11 January 2023 4	Al-Ahli	1–1	Etehad Al-Reef	Bahrain
18:00	79'	Report	59'

15 January 2023 4	Al-Ittifaq Maqaba	1–4	Busaiteen	Bahrain
18:00	71' (pen.)	Report	21'; 45'; 52'; 79'

19 March 2023 5	Etehad Al-Reef	0–5	Manama	Bahrain
18:30		Report

20 March 2023 5	Busaiteen	3–1	Al-Najma	Bahrain
18:30		Report

20 March 2023 5	Al-Ahli	1–0	Al-Ittifaq Maqaba	Bahrain
18:30	15'	Report

=== Group 3 ===
Pos	Team	Pld	W	D	L	GF	GA	GD	Pts	Qualification or relegation
1	Al-Khaldiya	5	5	0	0	14	0	+14	15	Advance to semi-finals
2	Al-Shabab	5	3	1	1	10	2	+8	10	
3	Al-Hala	5	2	0	3	7	6	+1	6	
4	Umm Al-Hassam	5	2	0	3	5	8	−3	6	
5	Qalali	5	1	1	3	2	9	−7	4	
6	Malkiya	5	1	0	4	2	15	−13	3	

Source: Soccerway
Rules for classification: Points, Goal difference, Goals scored, Head-to-head points, Head-to-head goal difference, Head-to-head goals scored

24 September 2022 1	Al-Shabab	6–0	Malkiya	Bahrain
17:00	2'; 16'; 26'; 39'; 53'; 56'	Report

24 September 2022 1	Al-Khaldiya	1–0	Al-Hala	Bahrain
18:45	84'	Report

24 September 2022 1	Umm Al-Hassam	2–0	Qalali	Bahrain
18:45	45+5'; 63'	Report

4 November 2022 2	Al-Hala	1–2	Al-Shabab	Bahrain
17:30	55'	Report	41'; 65'

5 November 2022 2	Al-Khaldiya	6–0	Qalali	Bahrain
17:30	18'; 32'; 33'; 50'; 52'; 81'	Report

5 November 2022 2	Malkiya	0–3	Umm Al-Hassam	Bahrain
17:30		Report

14 November 2022 3	Qalali	2–0	Al-Hala	Bahrain
17:30	79': 85'	Report

14 November 2022 3	Malkiya	0–4	Al-Khaldiya	Bahrain
17:30		Report

14 November 2022 3	Umm Al-Hassam	0–2	Al-Shabab	Bahrain
17:30		Report	28'; 42'

11 January 2023 4	Al-Hala	4–0	Umm Al-Hassam	Bahrain
18:00	1'; 14'; 25'; 33'	Report

14 January 2023 4	Malkiya	1–0	Qalali	Bahrain
18:00		Report

14 January 2023 4	Al-Shabab	0–1	Al-Khaldiya	Bahrain
18:00		Report	22'

19 March 2023 5	Umm Al-Hassam	0–2	Al-Khaldiya	Bahrain
18:30		Report	26'; 30'

20 March 2023 5	Al-Hala	2–1	Malkiya	Bahrain
18:30	34'; 35'	Report	79' (pen.)

20 March 2023 5	Qalali	0–0	Al-Shabab	Bahrain
18:30		Report

=== Group 4 ===
Pos	Team	Pld	W	D	L	GF	GA	GD	Pts	Qualification or relegation
1	Bahrain SC	5	3	2	0	12	5	+7	11	Advance to semi-finals
2	Buri	5	2	2	1	5	5	0	8	
3	East Riffa	5	2	1	2	8	3	+5	7	
4	Al-Muharraq	5	2	1	2	13	10	+3	7	
5	Sitra	5	1	2	2	5	6	−1	5	
6	Al-Tadamun	5	1	0	4	4	18	−14	3	

Source: Soccerway
Rules for classification: Points, Goal difference, Goals scored, Head-to-head points, Head-to-head goal difference, Head-to-head goals scored

24 September 2022 1	Buri	1–0	Al-Tadamun	Bahrain
17:00	85'	Report

24 September 2022 1	Bahrain SC	1–1	Sitra	Bahrain
18:45	42' (pen.)	Report	83'

24 September 2022 1	Al-Muharraq	0–1	East Riffa	Bahrain
18:45	82'	Report

5 November 2022 2	East Riffa	1–1	Bahrain SC	Bahrain
17:30	43'	Report	90+3'

5 November 2022 2	Al-Muharraq	6–2	Al-Tadamun	Bahrain
17:30		Report

5 November 2022 2	Sitra	0–0	Buri	Bahrain
17:30		Report

14 November 2022 3	Al-Tadamun	0–6	East Riffa	Bahrain
17:30		Report	7'; 20' (pen.); 26'; 76'; 79'; 90'

14 November 2022 3	Sitra	2–3	Al-Muharraq	Bahrain
17:30	5' (pen.); 30'	Report	25'; 37'; 71'

14 November 2022 3	Buri	1–3	Bahrain SC	Bahrain
17:30	15'	Report	23'; 47'; 74'

12 January 2023 4	Bahrain SC	3–2	Al-Muharraq	Bahrain
18:00	12'; 29'; 80'	Report	31'; 83'

14 January 2023 4	Sitra	1–2	Al-Tadamun	Bahrain
18:00	42' (pen.)	Report	18' (pen.); 87'

15 January 2023 4	East Riffa	0–1	Buri	Bahrain
18:00		Report	90'

19 March 2023 5	Al-Tadamun	0–4	Bahrain SC	Bahrain
18:30		Report	7'; 26'; 61'; 72'

19 March 2023 5	Buri	2–2	Al-Muharraq	Bahrain
18:30	49'; 78'	Report	45'; 90+3'

19 March 2023 5	East Riffa	0–1	Sitra	Bahrain
18:30		Report

== Semi-finals ==
The four group winners participated in the semi-finals.

Team 1	Score	Team 2
Al-Hidd (1)	1–2	Al-Khaldiya (1)
Manama (1)	1–1 (4–2 p)	Bahrain SC (1)

== Final ==
The final took place on 27 March 2023.

27 March 2023
21:45

Al-Khaldiya	2–2	Manama
Mendy 14'; Frioui 29'	Report	12'; 51'
Penalties
Penalty scored Penalty missed	4–5	Penalty scored
