= 2012 Bahraini King's Cup =

Tournament details
- Country: Bahrain
- Teams: 18

Final positions
- Champions: Al Muharraq
- Runners-up: Al Riffa

The Bahraini King's Cup is a cup competition involving teams from the Bahraini Premier League and 2nd tier.

Al Hadd are banned from this year's competition after they withdrew from their semi-final match against Muharraq in the 2011 Bahraini King's Cup competition.

The cup winner qualified for the 2013 AFC Cup.

== First round ==
2012-01-28
14:15

Budaiya	3 – 1	Qalali

2012-01-28
14:15

Sitra	0 – 3	Issa Town

2012-01-28
14:15

Tadamun Buri	2 – 0	Ittifaq Maqaba

== Second round ==
2012-03-02
15:05

Busaiteen Club	3 – 0	Al-Shabab

2012-03-02
17:15

Manama Club	3 – 2	Issa Town

2012-03-03
15:05

Al Hala Muharraq	0 – 1	Al Muharraq

2012-03-03
17:15

Al Ittihad Bahrain	2 – 3 (AET)	Malkiya

2012-03-04
15:05

Al Najma	4 – 0	Budaiya

2012-03-04
17:15

Tadamun Buri	0 – 9	Al Riffa

2012-03-05
16:30

Al Ahli Manama	0 – 0 (3-4 pens)	Bahrain Club

2012-03-05
16:30

East Riffa Club	(w/o) ^{1}	Al Hadd

^{1}Al Hadd were suspended from the competition and the game was awarded to East Riffa

== Quarter finals ==
2012-03-23
15:15

Al Najma	0 – 0 (5-3 pens)	Manama Club

2012-03-24
15:15

Busaiteen Club	0 – 0 (3-1 pens)	Malkiya

2012-03-24
16:30

Bahrain Club	1 – 6	Al Riffa

2012-03-24
18:30

Al Muharraq	2 – 1	East Riffa Club

== Semi finals ==
2012-03-31
16:15

Busaiteen Club	1 – 2	Al Muharraq

2012-03-31
18:15

Al Najma	0 – 1	Al Riffa

== Finals ==
2012-04-08
18:15

Al Muharraq	3 – 1	Al Riffa
