= 2023–24 Bahraini King's Cup =

2022–24 Bahraini King's Cup
Tournament details
- Country: Bahrain
- Dates: 1 November 2023 – 9 March 2024
- Teams: 24

Final positions
- Champions: Al-Ahli (9th title)
- Runners-up: Al-Muharraq

Tournament statistics
- Matches played: 23
- Goals scored: 58 (2.52 per match)

The 2023–24 Bahraini King's Cup was the 22nd season of the Bahraini King's Cup, the national football cup competition of Bahrain since it was renamed as the King's Cup in 2003 (named Emir Cup or Federation Cup before).

== Preliminary round ==
| Team 1 | Score | Team 2 |
|---|---|---|
| Etehad Al-Reef (2) | 1–1 (2–3 p) | Al-Ittifaq Maqaba (2) |
| Qalali (2) | 1–0 | Bahrain SC (2) |
| Malkiya (2) | 0–2 | A'Ali (2) |
| Isa Town (2) | 1–2 | East Riffa (1) |
| Al-Tadamun (2) | 0–3 | Al-Hala (1) |
| Al-Ittihad (2) | 0–0 (5–4 p) | Al-Najma (1) |
| Buri (2) | 0–3 | Busaiteen (1) |
| Umm Al-Hassam (2) | 1–0 | Budaiya (2) |

== Round of 16 ==
| Team 1 | Score | Team 2 |
|---|---|---|
| Al-Riffa (1) | 5–0 | A'Ali (2) |
| Al-Ahli (1) | 4–0 | Umm Al-Hassam (2) |
| Al-Khaldiya (1) | 3–1 | Al-Hala (1) |
| Al-Muharraq (1) | 1–0 | Qalali (2) |
| Al-Shabab (1) | 2–2 (7–8 p) | Al-Ittihad (2) |
| Sitra (1) | 0–1 | Busaiteen (1) |
| Manama (1) | 4–0 | East Riffa (1) |
| Al-Hidd (1) | 2–2 (1–4 p) | Al-Ittifaq Maqaba (2) |

== Quarter-finals ==
| Team 1 | Score | Team 2 |
|---|---|---|
| Al-Riffa (1) | 1–1 (a.e.t.) (4–5 p) | Al-Muharraq (1) |
| Al-Khaldiya (1) | 4–0 | Al-Ittihad (2) |
| Busaiteen (1) | 0–1 | Al-Ahli (1) |
| Manama (1) | 2–0 | Al-Ittifaq Maqaba (2) |

== Semi-finals ==
| Team 1 | Score | Team 2 |
|---|---|---|
| Al-Ahli (1) | 3–1 | Manama (1) |
| Al-Muharraq (1) | 1–0 | Al-Khaldiya (1) |

== Final ==
9 March 2023
18:30

| Al-Ahli | 1–1 (a.e.t.) | Al-Muharraq |
|---|---|---|
| Phoenix 7' | Report | Abdulkarim 84' |
Penalties
| Penalty scored | 4–2 | Penalty missed Penalty scored |

Bahrain National Stadium, Riffa
