= 2017–18 Bahraini King's Cup =

Tournament details
- Country: Bahrain

Final positions
- Champions: Al-Najma SC
- Runners-up: Al-Muharraq

Tournament statistics
- Matches played: 32
- Top goal scorer: Ahmed Al Khattal

The 2017–18 Bahraini King's Cup is the 16th season of the national football competition of Bahrain since it was renamed as the King's Cup in 2003 (named Emir Cup or Federation Cup before). The winners of the competition will earn a spot in the 2019 AFC Cup.

The competition started on 12 October 2017.

== Round 1 ==
12 October 2017	Sitra	0–1	Qalali	Al-Ahli Stadium

12 October 2017	Al Ittifaq Maqaba	2–2 (2–3 p)	Isa Town	Al-Riffa Stadium

12 October 2017	Busaiteen	3–1	Al Tadamun Buri	Hamad Town Stadium

== Round of 16 ==
=== First leg ===
20 October 2017	Al-Ahli	1–1	Manama Club	Bahrain National Stadium

20 October 2017	Al Shabab	0–0	Al-Najma SC	Bahrain National Stadium

21 October 2017	Budaiya	0–2	Al Hala	Khalifa Sports City Stadium

21 October 2017	Bahrain SC	1–2	Al Ittihad	Al-Ahli Stadium

22 October 2017	Al-Muharraq	1–1	East Riffa	Bahrain National Stadium

22 October 2017	Al Hidd	3–0	Qalali	Khalifa Sports City Stadium

23 October 2017	Al-Riffa	0–0	Isa Town	Khalifa Sports City Stadium

23 October 2017	Busaiteen	0–1	Malkiya	Bahrain National Stadium

=== Second leg ===
1 November 2017	Manama Club	3–1	Al-Ahli	Khalifa Sports City Stadium

1 November 2017	Al-Najma SC	0–0 (a.e.t.) (8–7 p)	Al Shabab	Khalifa Sports City Stadium

2 November 2017	Al Hala	0–1	Budaiya	Al-Ahli Stadium

2 November 2017	Al Ittihad	2–1	Bahrain SC	Khalifa Sports City Stadium

3 November 2017	East Riffa	0–1	Al-Muharraq	Bahrain National Stadium

3 November 2017	Qalali	0–4	Al Hidd	Bahrain National Stadium

4 November 2017	Isa Town	0–4	Al-Riffa	Khalifa Sports City Stadium

4 November 2017	Malkiya	3–2	Busaiteen	Khalifa Sports City Stadium

== Quarter-finals ==
=== 1st leg ===
24 November 2017	Al-Muharraq	1–0	Al Hidd	Bahrain National Stadium

24 November 2017	Al-Riffa	0–0	Malkiya	Bahrain National Stadium

25 November 2017	Al Hala	1–1	Al Ittihad	Khalifa Sports City Stadium

25 November 2017	Manama Club	0–0	Al-Najma SC	Khalifa Sports City Stadium

=== 2nd leg ===
15 January 2018	Al Ittihad	1–1 (a.e.t.) (5–3 p)	Al Hala	Bahrain National Stadium

15 January 2018	Al-Najma SC	2–1	Manama Club	Bahrain National Stadium

16 January 2018	Al Hidd	1–1	Al-Muharraq	Khalifa Sports City Stadium

16 January 2018	Malkiya	0–1	Al-Riffa	Khalifa Sports City Stadium

== Semi-finals ==
=== 1st leg ===
25 January 2018	Al Ittihad	0–0	Al-Najma SC	Khalifa Sports City Stadium
18:00

25 January 2018	Al-Muharraq	1–1	Al-Riffa	Khalifa Sports City Stadium
20:30	Abdulla Yusuf Helal		Rashed Al-Hooti

=== 2nd leg ===
8 February 2018	Al-Najma SC	1–0	Al Ittihad	Bahrain National Stadium
18:10	Alexander Da Silva

8 February 2018	Al-Riffa	0–2	Al-Muharraq	Bahrain National Stadium
20:40			Ziyad Al-Darbali; Mohammed Sola

== Final ==
15 February 2018	Al-Najma SC	1–1 (a.e.t.) (5–4 p)	Al-Muharraq	Bahrain National Stadium
18:30				Referee: Abdulamir Abdulshaheed
