= 2009–10 Bahrain First Division League =

Bahrain First Division League
- Season: 2009–10
- Champions: Al-Ahli (Manama)
- Relegated: East Riffa Club

The 2009–10 Bahrain First Division League was the 53rd season of top-level football in Bahrain.

Muharraq Club had been the defending champions for the previous four seasons, but lost this championship on the final day to Al-Ahli (Manama).

== Structure Changes ==
The league was reduced from the previous season's 19 to 10 clubs.

== Members clubs ==
Locations of teams in the 2009–10 Bahrain CSL

Club	City	Stadium	2008–09 season
Al Ahli	Manama	Al Ahli Stadium	3rd
Al Hala	Muharraq	Al Muharraq Stadium	10th
Al-Muharraq	Muharraq	Al Muharraq Stadium	Champions
Al-Najma SC	Manama	Madinat 'Isa Stadium	6th
Al-Shabab	Manama	Bahrain National Stadium	8th
Bahrain Riffa Club	Riffa	Bahrain National Stadium	Runners-up
Busaiteen Club	Busaiteen		5th
East Riffa Club	Riffa	Al Ahli Stadium	4th
Malkiya	Malkiya	Madinat 'Isa Stadium	9th
Manama Club	Manama	Bahrain National Stadium	7th

== Final league table ==
Pos	Team	Pld	W	D	L	GF	GA	GD	Pts	Qualification or relegation
1	Al-Ahli Manama (C)	18	13	2	3	26	17	+9	41	Crown Prince Cup and GCC Cup qualifier
2	Al-Muharraq	18	13	1	4	38	20	+18	40	Crown Prince Cup and GCC Cup qualifier
3	Al-Riffa	18	12	2	4	36	18	+18	38	Crown Prince Cup qualifier
4	Al-Najma	18	10	2	6	26	17	+9	32	Crown Prince Cup qualifier
5	Busaiteen	18	6	5	7	29	23	+6	23	
6	Manama Club	18	4	6	8	22	32	−10	18	
7	Al-Shabab Manama	18	5	2	11	19	35	−16	17	
8	Al Hala	18	4	4	10	27	31	−4	16	Relegation Playoff
9	Malkiya	18	4	4	10	18	31	−13	16	Relegation Playoff
10	East Riffa Club (R)	18	3	4	11	21	38	−17	13	Relegation

Updated to match(es) played on 18 May 2010. Source: Soccerway
Rules for classification: 1) points; 2) goal difference; 3) number of goals scored.
(C) Champions; (R) Relegated

== 8th-place play-off ==
18 May 2010

Malkiya	2 – 3	Al Hala

Al Hala come 8th, Malkiya enter promotion/relegation playoff

== Promotion/relegation play-off ==
Team 1	Agg.	Team 2	1st leg	2nd leg
Malkiya	4-4	Sitra	2-3	2-1

== Fixtures and results ==
Home \ Away	MHR	BRC	AHL	ERC	BUS	NJM	MNB	SHB	MLK	HLA
Al-Muharraq		2–1	0–1	1–0	1–0	0–1	7–3	3–2	1–1	3–0
Al-Riffa	2–0		0–1	4–0	3–2	0–1	0–0	3–0	4–1	4–3
Al-Ahli Manama	2–6	1–0		2–0	2–0	1–0	3–1	1–1	1–0	1–0
East Riffa Club	1–2	1–3	0–3		3–1	2–3	2–2	2–1	0–2	2–2
Busaiteen	2–1	1–1	1–2	4–0		1–1	1–1	1–3	1–1	1–0
Al-Najma	1–2	1–2	4–0	3–1	2–1		1–1	1–0	3–1	2–1
Manama Club	0–2	2–3	2–1	1–1	0–1	2–1		3–2	1–2	2–1
Al-Shabab Manama	1–3	0–2	1–2	1–0	0–6	0–1	1–1		2–1	1–4
Malkiya	1–2	1–2	0–0	0–3	1–4	1–0	2–0	1–2		0–3
Al Hala	1–2	1–2	1–2	3–3	1–1	2–1	2–1	0–1	2–2	

Updated to match(es) played on 18 May 2010. Source: Soccerway
Legend: Blue = home team win; Yellow = draw; Red = away team win.
