= 2010–11 Bahrain First Division League =

Bahrain First Division League
- Season: 2010–11
- Champions: Al-Muharraq (32nd Title)

The 2010–11 Bahrain First Division League is the 54th edition of top-level football in Bahrain. Al-Ahli (Manama) were the defending champions. The winner of the league was Al-Muharraq SC

== Teams ==
East Riffa Club were relegated to the second level after finishing the 2009–10 season in the bottom place. They were replaced by Al Hidd of Muharraq.

The league was heavily disrupted by the Bahraini uprising in February and a number of games were cancelled or awarded to the opposition team. As it became clear that the league would struggle to continue with the number of postponements, it appeared that Al-Shabab and Malkiya either withdrew from the championship or suspended from the championship presumably resulting in automatic relegation.

=== Stadia and locations ===
Locations of teams in the 2010–11 Bahraini League

Club	Location	Stadium
Al Ahli	Manama	Al Ahli Stadium
Al Hidd	Al Hidd	
Al Hala	Muharraq	Al Muharraq Stadium
Al-Muharraq	Muharraq	Al Muharraq Stadium
Al-Najma	Manama	Madinat 'Isa Stadium
Al-Shabab	Manama	Bahrain National Stadium
Bahrain Riffa Club	Riffa	Bahrain National Stadium
Busaiteen Club	Busaiteen	
Malkiya	Malkiya	Madinat 'Isa Stadium
Manama Club	Manama	Bahrain National Stadium

== League table ==
Pos	Team	Pld	W	D	L	GF	GA	GD	Pts	Qualification
1	Al-Muharraq	14	8	4	2	26	14	+12	28	
2	Al-Riffa	14	7	5	2	31	18	+13	26	
3	Al-Ahli Manama	14	7	3	4	30	21	+9	24	
4	Al Hadd Club	14	5	5	4	24	28	−4	20	
5	Manama Club	14	5	4	5	22	22	0	19	
6	Busaiteen	14	2	7	5	18	24	−6	13	
7	Al Hala	14	1	7	6	14	28	−14	10	
8	Al-Najma	14	1	5	8	15	25	−10	8	
9	Malkiya	0	0	0	0	0	0	0	0	Withdrew
10	Al-Shabab	0	0	0	0	0	0	0	0	Withdrew

Updated to match(es) played on 30 May 2011. Source: Soccerway
Rules for classification: 1) points; 2) goal difference; 3) number of goals scored.

== Topscorers ==
Rank	Player	Club	Goals
1	(Brazil) Diego	Al Ahli	13
1	(Bahrain) Abdulrahman Mubarak	Bahrain Riffa Club	13
3	(Bahrain) Hussain Ali	Al-Muharraq	10
4	(Bahrain) Mohammed Saleh	Al Hala Club	6
5	(Brazil) Rico	Bahrain Riffa Club	5
5	(Morocco) Tarik El-Janaby	Al Ahli	5
5	(Bahrain) Safi Fattah	Busaiteen Club	5
8	(Brazil) Vitor Hogo	Manama Club	4
8	(Chad) Abu Bakr Adam	Manama Club	4
8	(Bahrain) Mohammed Al-Tayeb	Al-Najma	4
11	(Bahrain) Jamal Rashed	Al Ahli	3
11	(Brazil) Roberto Brasa	Al Hadd Club	3
11	(Bahrain) Abdullah Issa	Malkiya	3
