= 2009 Bahraini King's Cup =

Tournament details
- Teams: 18

Final positions
- Champions: Al Muharraq
- Runners-up: Bahrain Riffa Club

The Bahraini King's Cup is an end of season cup competition involving teams from the Bahraini Premier League.

The 2009 edition was the 53rd to be held.

Muharraq Club were the 2008 holders and retained the title. It was also Muharraq's 4th title of the domestic campaign.

== First round ==
The first round of the competition involves the lowest 6 teams in the Bahrain Classification Soccer League 2008-09 season. Games were played over 15 and 16 May.

Team 1	Score	Team 2
15 May 2009
Budaiya	1-2	Tadamun Buri
Ittifaq Maqaba	1-4	Al Ittihad Bahrain
16 May 2009
Issa Town	2-2 (aet, p. 3-4)	Qalali

== Round of 16 ==
Team 1	Score	Team 2
21 June 2009
Muharraq Club	4-0	Tadamun Buri
Al Hadd	4-2	Al-Shabab Club
22 June 2009
Manama Club	0–3	Sitra Club
Al Ittihad Bahrain	0-5	Bahrain Riffa Club
23 June 2009
Al Ahli Club	3-1	Bahrain Club
Malkiya	1-2	Busaiteen Club
24 June 2009
Al Najma Club	6–0	Al Hala
Qalali	2-3	East Riffa Club

== Quarter-finals ==
Team 1	Score	Team 2
27 June 2009
Sitra Club	0-2	Bahrain Riffa Club
Muharraq Club	10-0	Al Hadd
28 June 2009
Al Ahli Club	4-3	Busaiteen Club
29 June 2009
Al Najma Club	2-1	East Riffa Club

== Semi-finals ==
Team 1	Score	Team 2
2 July 2009
Al Ahli Club	2-3	Bahrain Riffa Club
3 July 2009
Muharraq Club	1-0	Al Najma Club

== Final ==
17 July 2009
16:00

Muharraq Club	1 – 1 (a.e.t.) 9 – 8 penalties	Bahrain Riffa Club
Hussain Ali 45'	Report	Mohammed Salman 49'; Ahmed Matar (red card)

Bahraini King's Cup
2009 Winners
Muharraq Club
27th Title
2nd in a row
