= 2018–19 Bahraini King's Cup =

Tournament details
- Country: Bahrain
- Dates: 30 August 2018 – 21 February 2019

Final positions
- Champions: Al-Riffa (6th title)
- Runners-up: Al-Hidd

The 2018–19 Bahraini King's Cup is the 17th season of the Bahraini King's Cup, the national football cup competition of Bahrain since it was renamed as the King's Cup in 2003 (named Emir Cup or Federation Cup before). The winners of the competition will earn a spot in the 2020 AFC Cup.

== Preliminary round ==
In the preliminary round, nine teams were divided into two groups, one of five and one of four. The matches were played between 30 August and 25 September 2018.

=== Group 1 ===
Pos	Team	Pld	W	D	L	GF	GA	GD	Pts	Qualification or relegation
1	Busaiteen	4	3	1	0	6	3	+3	10	Qualification to Round of 16
2	Al Bahrain	4	2	2	0	7	3	+4	8	Qualification to Round of 16
3	Al Ittihad	4	2	1	1	8	6	+2	7	Qualification to Round of 16
4	Al Ittifaq Maqaba	4	1	0	3	2	5	−3	3	
5	Al Tadamun Buri	4	0	0	4	5	11	−6	0	

Source: goalzz

=== Group 2 ===
Pos	Team	Pld	W	D	L	GF	GA	GD	Pts	Qualification or relegation
1	Al-Ahli	3	2	1	0	12	4	+8	7	Qualification to Round of 16
2	Sitra	3	2	0	1	4	5	−1	6	Qualification to Round of 16
3	Isa Town	3	1	0	2	3	8	−5	3	Qualification to Round of 16
4	Qalali	3	0	1	2	4	6	−2	1	

Source: goalzz

== Round of 16 ==
The first legs were played between 21 and 22 October 2018, and the second legs were played between 25 and 27 October 2018.

Team 1	Agg.	Team 2	1st leg	2nd leg
Al Bahrain	2–3	Al Shabab	0–1	2–2
Malkiya	0–2	Al Hala	0–1	0–1
Busaiteen	3–3 (4–5 p)	Al-Riffa	2–2	1–1
Budaiya	1–3	Al-Muharraq	0–1	1–2
Al-Hidd	3–0	Sitra	1–0	2–0
East Riffa	0–0 (4–2 p)	Isa Town	0–0	0–0
Al-Najma	5–2	Al Ittihad	2–1	3–1
Al-Ahli	2–3	Manama	2–2	0–1

== Quarter-finals ==
The first legs will be played between 4–5 December 2018, and the second legs will be played between 8–9 December 2018.

Team 1	Agg.	Team 2	1st leg	2nd leg
Al Hala	3–2	Al-Najma	3–2	0–0
East Riffa	0–2	Al-Hidd	0–1	0–1
Al Shabab	1–4	Al-Riffa	0–1	1–3
Manama	2–2 (a)	Al-Muharraq	2–1	0–1

== Semi-finals ==
The first leg matches played on 6 February, while the second leg matches played on 11 February.

Team 1	Agg.	Team 2	1st leg	2nd leg
Al Hala	2–5	Al-Hidd	0–3	2–2
Al-Muharraq	2–3	Al-Riffa	1–3	1–0

== Final ==
21 February 2019
15:00

Al-Hidd	1–2 (a.e.t.)	Al-Riffa

Bahrain National Stadium, Riffa
Referee: Isa Abdulla Ali
