= 2011 Bahraini King's Cup =

Football competition

Tournament details
- Teams: 19

Final positions
- Champions: Al Muharraq
- Runners-up: Busaiteen

The Bahraini King's Cup is a cup competition involving teams from the Bahraini Premier League and 2nd tier. The 2011 edition was once again moved and started before the regular 2011/12 domestic leagues started.

== First round ==
2011-09-15
17:15

Manama Club	2 – 1	Al-Shabab

2011-09-15
17:15

Issa Town	0 – 3	Al-Ahli Manama

2011-09-15
19:30

Tadamun Buri	0 – 5	Busaiteen Club

== Second round ==
2011-09-24
16:15

Bahrain Riffa Club	1 – 3	Al-Hidd

2011-09-24
16:15

Budaiya	3 – 2	Qalali

2011-09-24
18:15

Sitra	1 – 2	Al Najma

2011-09-24
18:15

Al Muharraq	5 – 0	Al Hala Muharraq

2011-09-25
17:15

Al Ittihad Bahrain	0 – 2	Busaiteen Club

2011-09-25
17:15

Bahrain Club	3 – 1 (AET)	East Riffa Club

2011-09-25
18:15

Malkiya	0 – 1	Al Ahli Manama

2011-09-25
19:00

Ittifaq Maqaba	0 – 8	Manama Club

== Quarter-finals ==
2011-09-29
17:15

Al-Hidd	5 – 1	Budaiya

2011-09-29
19:30

Al Najma	0 – 3	Busaiteen Club

2011-09-30
17:15

Manama Club	0 – 3	Al Muharraq

2011-09-30
17:15

Al Ahli Manama	2 – 2 (4-2 p)	Bahrain Club

== Semi-finals ==
2011-10-25
17:15

Al-Hidd	0 - 3 (w/o) ^{1}	Al Muharraq
	Report

2011-10-25
17:15

Al Ahli Manama	0 – 0 (3-4 p)	Busaiteen Club
	Report

^{1} Al Hidd players and officials were no show against Muharraq who were declared winners 3–0. The semi-finals were scheduled to take place on Monday, but the BFA decided to have these matches played one day later. This decision was to allow the international players from the four clubs to rest after leading the national team to a 3–1 win over Saudi Arabia in the soccer tournament of the First GCC Games held on Saturday.

And as a sign of rejection to BFA's decision, Al Hidd players and officials were present at the National Stadium on Monday to show their neglecting of BFA's late decision.

== Final ==
2011-10-29
19:00

Busaiteen Club	0 - 3	Al Muharraq
	Report
