= 2016–17 Bahraini King's Cup =

Tournament details
- Country: Bahrain
- Teams: 19

Final positions
- Champions: Manama
- Runners-up: Muharraq

The Bahraini King's Cup is a cup competition involving teams from the Bahraini Premier League and 2nd tier. Muharraq are the current holders of the King's Cup, having defeated Riffa in last year's final.

Manama defeated Muharraq in the final to win their first King's Cup.

== Preliminary round ==
Team 1	Score	Team 2
Al-Ittifaq	3–1	Tadamun Buri
Budaiya Club	2–0	Busaiteen
Isa Town Club	1–3 (a.e.t.)	Sitra

== Round of 16 ==
Team 1	Score	Team 2
Al-Hidd	4–0	East Riffa Club
Al-Shabab	4–1	Al-Ittifaq
Manama	2–1	Bahrain
Al Hala	0–2	Malkiya
Al Ahli	2–0	Sitra
Al-Ittihad	3–3 (a.e.t.) (5–4 p)	Budaiya Club
Al-Muharraq	3–1	Qalali
Al-Najma	3–3 (a.e.t.) (2–4 p)	Riffa

== Quarter-finals ==
Team 1	Score	Team 2
Al-Hidd	0–5	Manama
Al-Shabab	4–1	Malkiya
Al Ahli	1–2 (a.e.t.)	Riffa
Al-Muharraq	1–0	Al-Ittihad

== Semi-finals ==
Team 1	Score	Team 2
Manama	1–0	Al-Shabab
Riffa	0–1	Al-Muharraq

== Final ==
Team 1	Score	Team 2
Manama	2–1	Al-Muharraq
