= Football in Bahrain =

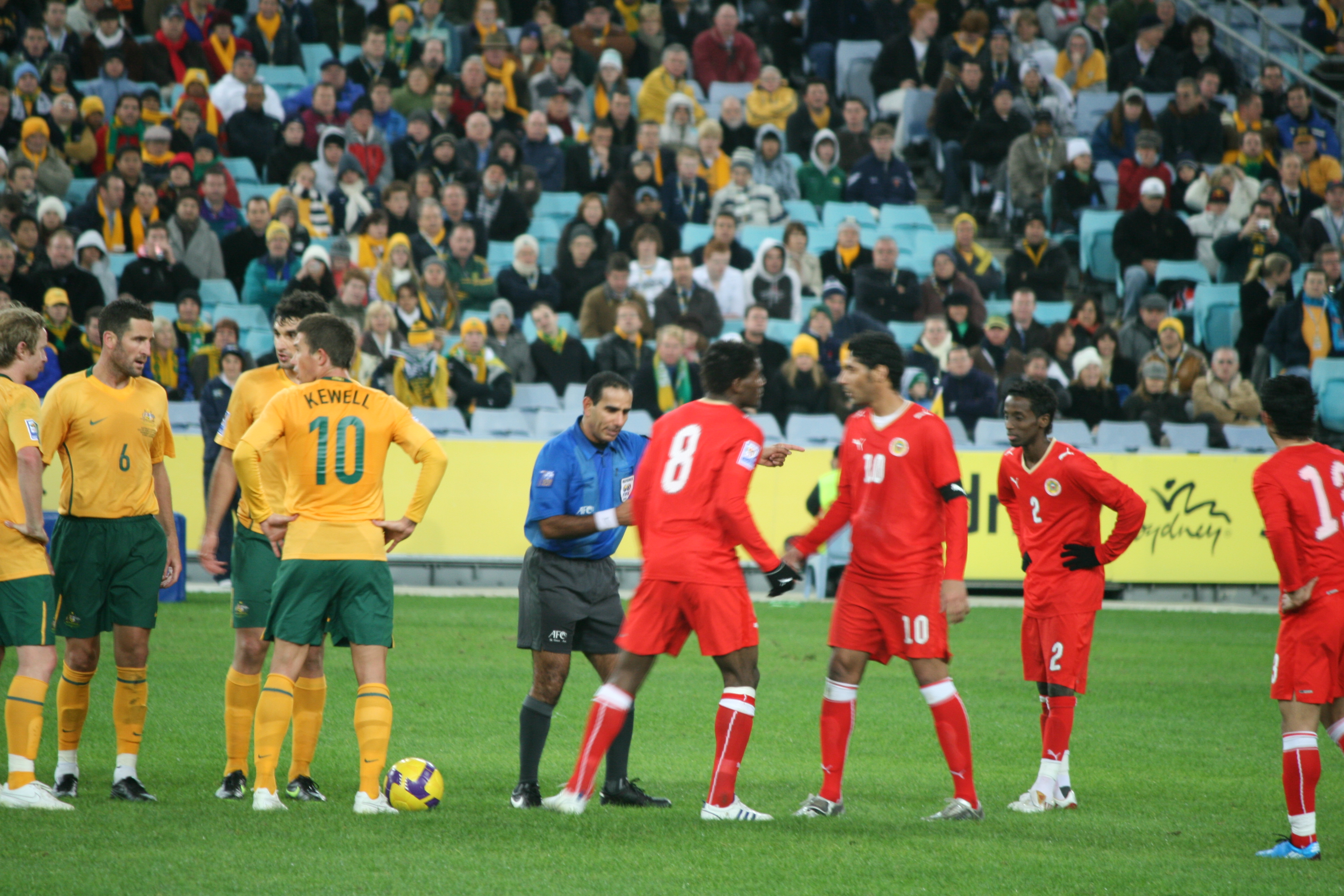
- The Bahrain national team playing Australia on June 10, 2009, in a World Cup qualifier
- Country: Bahrain
- Governing body: Bahrain Football Association
- National team: men's national team

National competitions
- Bahraini Premier League; Bahraini Second Division; Bahraini King's Cup; Bahraini FA Cup; Bahraini Super Cup

International competitions
- AFC Cup; AFC Champions League; FIFA World Cup; Asian Cup

The sport of football in the country of Bahrain is run by the Bahrain Football Association, and significantly the most popular sport in the nation.

Bahrain has its own top-tier domestic professional football league, the Bahraini Premier League. It features 10 football clubs that play a two-round robin set, with each team playing a total of 18 fixtures. The winners of the domestic championship qualify for the AFC Cup.

The league uses a promotion and relegation system in association with the Bahraini Second Division, Bahrain's second-tier football league. The season usually starts in September and concludes in May, as in other football leagues. The first season was held in 1952. Although games are played on a home and away basis, most games are played at the Bahrain National Stadium.

The relegation of the lowest season finishing team is decided by a relegation/promotion playoff match against the second lowest finishing team. The most successful club in the league's history is Al-Muharraq SC.

== Total championships ==
As of 2019–20 season.

Club	Number of Championships
Muharraq Club	34
Bahrain Riffa Club (includes West Riffa)	12
Bahrain Club	5
Al-Ahli (Manama)	5
Al-Hidd	2
Al-Nasr	1
Arabi Club	1
Al Hala SC	1
East Riffa Club	1
Busaiteen	1
Malkiya SCC	1

== League system ==
Level	League(s)/Division(s)
1	Premier League; 12 clubs
	↓↑ 2 clubs
2	Second Division; 12 clubs

== The Bahrain national football team ==
The most significant achievement of the Bahrain national football team is reaching the semi-finals of the 2004 AFC Asian Cup. The national football team of Bahrain lost against Japan in the semi-finals of the tournament.

== Football stadiums in Bahrain ==
#	Stadium	City	Capacity	Home team(s)	Image
1	Bahrain National Stadium	Riffa	24,000	Bahrain national football team, Al-Khaldiya SC, Al-Riffa SC	
2	Al Muharraq Stadium	Arad	20,000	Al-Muharraq SC	
3	Khalifa Sports City Stadium	Isa Town	15,000		
4	Al-Ahli Stadium	Manama	10,000	Al-Ahli Club	

== See also ==
- Sport in Bahrain
- Bahrain national football team
- Lists of stadiums
