= 2010 Bahraini King's Cup =

Tournament details
- Teams: 18

Final positions
- Champions: Bahrain Riffa Club
- Runners-up: Busaiteen

The Bahraini King's Cup is a cup competition involving teams from the Bahraini Premier League and 2nd tier. The 2009 edition was played at the end of the domestic season, but the 2010 and 2011 editions were moved forward to start before the regular domestic leagues started.

Al Ahli was banned by the Bahrain Football Association this season after the team pulled out of last year's Crown Prince Cup semi-final match against Riffa.

The 2010 edition is the 54th to be held.

== First round ==
The first round of the competition involves four teams from the 2nd tier league.

Team 1	Score	Team 2
13 December 2009
Al Ittihad Bahrain	3-0	Tadamun Buri
14 December 2009
Qalali	1-0	Issa Town

== Round 2 ==
Team 1	Score	Team 2
31 December 2009
Muharraq Club	2 - 0	Ittifaq Maqaba
Bahrain Club	1 - 4	Bahrain Riffa Club
1 January 2010
Al-Shabab	3 – 2	Qalali
Malkiya	3 - 0	Budaiya
2 January 2010
Manama Club	3 - 1	Al Hala
East Riffa Club	0 - 2	Al Hadd
3 January 2010
Sitra Club	3 – 2	Al Najma Club
Busaiteen Club	2 - 1	Al Ittihad Bahrain

== Quarter finals ==
Team 1	Score	Team 2
12 January 2010
Muharraq Club	3 - 0	Malkiya
13 January 2010
Al-Shabab	1 - 5	Bahrain Riffa Club
14 January 2010
Busaiteen Club	4 - 0	Sitra Club
15 January 2010
Manama Club	3 - 0	Al Hadd

== Semi finals ==
Team 1	Score	Team 2
25 January 2010
Muharraq Club	1 - 2	Busaiteen Club
26 January 2010
Bahrain Riffa Club	2 - 1	Manama Club

== Final ==
11 February 2010
16:00

Busaiteen Club	0 – 4	Bahrain Riffa Club

Bahraini King's Cup
2010 Winners
Bahrain Riffa Club
5th Title
