= 2017–18 Bahraini Premier League =

Bahraini Premier League
- Season: 2017–18
- Champions: Al-Muharraq
- Relegated: Al Ittihad; Al-Ahli
- Matches: 90
- Goals: 264 (2.93 per match)

The 2017–18 Bahraini Premier League was the 61st top-level football season in Bahrain. Many league games took place in front of hundreds of spectators.

== Foreign players ==
| Club | Player 1 | Player 2 | Player 3 | Player 4 | Player 5 | AFC Player | Former Players |
|---|---|---|---|---|---|---|---|
| Al-Ahli | (Brazil) Cleiton Mineiro | (Democratic Republic of the Congo) Doris Fuakumputu | (Ivory Coast) Daouda Sylla | (Mali) Saliou Guindo | | (Timor-Leste) Pedro Henrique | (Ivory Coast) Mohamed Lamine (Togo) Komi-Fovi Aguidi |
| Al-Hidd | (Brazil) Lynneeker | (Ghana) Moussa Narry | (Nigeria) Ifedayo Olusegun | (Nigeria) Orok Akarandut | | (Jordan) Mohammad Al-Dawud | |
| Al-Ittihad | | | | | | | |
| Al-Muharraq | (Brazil) João Luiz | (Libya) Mohammed Soulah | (Tunisia) Ziad Derbali | (Tunisia) Zied Ziadi | | (Syria) Ahmad Deeb | (Brazil) Diego Silva (Brazil) Felipinho |
| Al-Najma | (Brazil) Esdras | (Nigeria) Uche Agba | | | | (Syria) Mohamad Fares | (Brazil) Edílson |
| Al-Riffa | (Colombia) Víctor Montaño | (Morocco) Adil Haffari | (Nigeria) Onuoha Ogbonna | (Tunisia) Oussema Boughanmi | (Venezuela) Jairo Otero | (Syria) Mohammed Al Wakid | (Brazil) Danilo Bueno (Brazil) Leo (Kyrgyzstan) Azamat Baymatov |
| Al-Shabab | | | | | | | (Ghana) Abdul Aziz Yusuf (Ghana) Michael Annan |
| East Riffa | | | | | | | (Yemen) Mudir Al-Radaei |
| Malkiya | (Nigeria) Gege Soriola | (Syria) Israa Hamwiah | | | | (Yemen) Nawaf Abdullah | |
| Manama | (Brazil) Erick Luis | (Brazil) Luís Gustavo | (Brazil) Ronir | | | | (Brazil) Lázaro (Democratic Republic of the Congo) Doris Fuakumputu (South Korea) Lee Won-jae |

== League table ==
| Pos | Team | Pld | W | D | L | GF | GA | GD | Pts | Promotion or relegation |
|---|---|---|---|---|---|---|---|---|---|---|
| 1 | Al-Muharraq (C) | 18 | 14 | 3 | 1 | 31 | 7 | +24 | 45 | Qualification to 2019 AFC Champions League first preliminary round |
| 2 | Al-Najma SC | 18 | 8 | 6 | 4 | 34 | 26 | +8 | 30 | |
| 3 | Manama Club | 18 | 8 | 5 | 5 | 33 | 20 | +13 | 29 | |
| 4 | Malkiya | 18 | 8 | 4 | 6 | 36 | 30 | +6 | 28 | |
| 5 | Al-Shabab | 18 | 5 | 9 | 4 | 19 | 20 | −1 | 24 | |
| 6 | Al Hidd | 18 | 5 | 6 | 7 | 22 | 30 | −8 | 21 | |
| 7 | Al-Riffa | 18 | 5 | 4 | 9 | 22 | 31 | −9 | 19 | |
| 8 | East Riffa | 18 | 3 | 8 | 7 | 24 | 32 | −8 | 17 | |
| 9 | Al Ittihad | 18 | 3 | 5 | 10 | 22 | 34 | −12 | 14 | Relegation to the 2018–19 Bahraini Second Division |
| 10 | Al-Ahli | 18 | 4 | 4 | 10 | 21 | 34 | −13 | 13 (Note: Al-Ahli deducted 3 points) | Relegation to the 2018–19 Bahraini Second Division |

Source: FIFA
Rules for classification: 1) Points; 2) Goal difference; 3) Number of goals scored
(C) Champions
