= Mohammed Tayeb Al Alawi =

Bahraini footballer

Mohammed Tayeb
Personal information
- Full name: Mohammed Tayeb Al Alawi
- Date of birth: October 13, 1989 (age 37)
- Place of birth: Manama, Bahrain
- Position: Forward

Team information
- Current team: Al-Najma
- Number: 7

Youth career
- 2005–2008: Al-Najma

Senior career*
Years	Team	Apps	(Gls)
2008–2014	Al-Najma	70	(28)
2014–2016	Al-Riffa	10	(7)
2016–	Al-Najma	21	(5)

International career^{‡}
2011–2017	Bahrain	30	(5)
- * Club domestic league appearances and goals as of 16 September 2018 ‡ National team caps and goals as of 6 June 2017

Mohammed Tayeb Al Alawi (born 13 October 1989) is a Bahrain association footballer currently playing for Al-Najma and the Bahrain national football team as a striker.

== Career ==
Al Alawi has played for Al-Najma since 2008, and scored 28 goals for the club.

== International career ==
To date, Al Alawai has made 8 appearances for the Bahrain national football team scoring 5 goals; 3 of which, came during the 2014 FIFA World Cup qualification – AFC third round. Bahrain failed to qualify out of the group stage. He was on the Bahrain squad that won the 2011 Pan Arab Games and scored a goal in the semi-final against Palestine.

=== International goals ===
Scores and results list Bahrain's goal tally first.

Goal	Date	Venue	Opponent	Score	Result	Competition
1.	20 December 2011	Thani bin Jassim Stadium, Al Rayyan, Qatar	Palestine	1–0	3–1	2011 Pan Arab Games
2.	29 February 2012	Bahrain National Stadium, Riffa, Bahrain	Indonesia	2–0	10–0	2014 FIFA World Cup qualification
3.	29 February 2012	Bahrain National Stadium, Riffa, Bahrain	Indonesia	5–0	10–0	2014 FIFA World Cup qualification
4.	29 February 2012	Bahrain National Stadium, Riffa, Bahrain	Indonesia	7–0	10–0	2014 FIFA World Cup qualification
5.	11 October 2016	Sultan Qaboos Sports Complex, Muscat, Oman	Oman	2–0	2–2	Friendly

== Honours ==
=== International ===
Bahrain

- Pan Arab Games (1): 2011

=== Club ===
Al-Najma

- Bahraini Super Cup (1) : 2008
- Bahraini King's Cup (1) : 2018
