= 2016 Bahrain King's Cup final =

2016 Bahraini King's Cup final
- Event: 2016 Bahraini King's Cup
Muharraq	Riffa
3	1
- Date: 3 March 2016
- Venue: Bahrain National Stadium, Riffa
- Referee: Waleed Mahmoud (Bahrain)
- Attendance: 10,000

The Bahraini King's Cup final was a match that took place on 3 March 2016 at the Bahrain National Stadium in Riffa to determine the winner of the 2016 Bahraini King's Cup. The winner of this match would guarantee a spot at the next year's AFC Cup edition. Muharraq defeated "Bahraini El-Classico" rivals Riffa in Riffa with 2 late goals by Ali Jamal and Jamal Rashid, to be crowned winners in front of a Muharraq-heavy audience. This was the 5th time that Muharraq played Riffa in the King's Cup Final, with Muharraq winning on each occasion. The last encounter between both teams for the King's Cup trophy came in the 2013 Bahraini King's Cup, when a penalty shoot-out separated the sides and saw Muharraq win their 31st title.
