= 30th GCC Club Cup =

2015 GCC Club Cup
كأس الأندية الخليجية

Tournament details
- Dates: 3 February – 27 May 2015
- Teams: 12 (from AFC/UAFA confederations)

Final positions
- Champions: (United Arab Emirates) Al-Shabab (3rd title)
- Runners-up: (Oman) Al-Seeb

The 30th GCC Club Cup (Arabic: كأس الأندية الخليجية) was the 30th edition of the GCC Club Cup for clubs of the Gulf Cooperation Council nations, held in 2015.

The tournament started in February and finished with the final on 27 May.

== Teams ==
Entrants
Team	Qualifying method
Group stage direct entrants (Groups A–D)
(Bahrain) East Riffa	2014 Bahraini King's Cup winners
(Bahrain) Manama	2013–14 Bahrain First Division League runners up
(Kuwait) Al Jahra	2013–14 Kuwaiti Premier League 3rd place
(Kuwait) Kazma	2013–14 Kuwaiti Premier League 4th place
(Oman) Al Suwaiq	2013–14 Oman Professional League 3rd place
(Oman) Al Seeb	2013–14 Oman Professional League 4th place
(Qatar) Al Arabi	2013–14 Qatar Stars League 5th place
(Qatar) Al Rayyan	2013–14 Qatar Stars League 13th place
(Saudi Arabia) Al Taawon	2013–14 Saudi Professional League 5th place
(Saudi Arabia) Al Faisaly	2013–14 Saudi Professional League 7th place
(United Arab Emirates) Al Shabab	2013–14 Arabian Gulf League 4th place
(United Arab Emirates) Al Nasr	2013–14 Arabian Gulf League 5th place

== Group stage ==
Group stage is played as a double round-robin, thus each team plays four matches. After that the top two teams advance to the quarter-finals.

=== Group A ===
Team	Pld	W	D	L	GF	GA	GD	Pts
(Qatar) Al Rayyan	4	2	2	0	9	4	+5	8
(Saudi Arabia) Al Taawon	4	1	3	0	6	5	+1	6
(Oman) Al Suwaiq	4	0	1	3	3	9	–6	1

3 February 2015	Al Suwaiq (Oman)	2–2	(Saudi Arabia) Al Taawon	Sultan Qaboos Sports Complex, Muscat
18:00		Report

18 February 2015	Al Rayyan (Qatar)	2–1	(Oman) Al Suwaiq	Jassim Bin Hamad Stadium, Doha
18:00		Report

24 February 2015	Al Taawon (Saudi Arabia)	1–1	(Qatar) Al Rayyan	King Abdullah Sport City Stadium, Buraidah
20:15		Report

3 March 2015	Al Taawon (Saudi Arabia)	1–0	(Oman) Al Suwaiq	King Abdullah Sport City Stadium, Buraidah
20:15		Report

17 March 2015	Al Rayyan (Qatar)	2–2	(Saudi Arabia) Al Taawon	Abdullah bin Khalifa Stadium, Doha
18:30		Report

8 April 2015	Al Suwaiq (Oman)	0–4	(Qatar) Al Rayyan	Al-Seeb Stadium, Seeb
19:30		Report

=== Group B ===
Team	Pld	W	D	L	GF	GA	GD	Pts
(United Arab Emirates) Al Shabab	4	3	0	1	10	2	+8	9
(Oman) Al Seeb	4	1	1	2	3	8	−5	4
(Qatar) Al Arabi	4	1	1	2	2	5	−3	4

3 February 2015	Al Arabi (Qatar)	0–0	(Oman) Al Seeb	Grand Hamad Stadium, Doha
18:00		Report

17 February 2015	Al Seeb (Oman)	1–3	(United Arab Emirates) Al Shabab	Sultan Qaboos Sports Complex, Muscat
19:00		Report

25 February 2015	Al Shabab (United Arab Emirates)	3–0	(Qatar) Al Arabi	Maktoum Bin Rashid Al Maktoum Stadium, Dubai
17:35		Report

3 March 2015	Al Seeb (Oman)	2–1	(Qatar) Al Arabi	Sultan Qaboos Sports Complex, Muscat
19:00		Report

17 March 2015	Al Shabab (United Arab Emirates)	4–0	(Oman) Al Seeb	Maktoum Bin Rashid Al Maktoum Stadium, Dubai
17:45		Report

7 April 2015	Al Arabi (Qatar)	1–0	(United Arab Emirates) Al Shabab	Grand Hamad Stadium, Doha
18:30		Report

=== Group C ===
Team	Pld	W	D	L	GF	GA	GD	Pts
(United Arab Emirates) Al Nasr	4	3	0	1	8	6	+2	9
(Kuwait) Kazma	4	2	0	2	6	6	0	6
(Bahrain) Manama	4	1	0	3	6	8	–2	3

4 February 2015	Kazma (Kuwait)	2–1	(Bahrain) Manama	Al-Sadaqua Walsalam Stadium, Adiliya
17:45		Report

16 February 2015	Manama (Bahrain)	2–1	(United Arab Emirates) Al Nasr	Khalifa Sports City Stadium, Isa Town
18:15		Report

24 February 2015	Al Nasr (United Arab Emirates)	2–1	(Kuwait) Kazma	Al-Maktoum Stadium, Dubai
19:00		Report

10 March 2015	Manama (Bahrain)	1–2	(Kuwait) Kazma	Khalifa Sports City Stadium, Isa Town
18:30		Report

18 March 2015	Al Nasr (United Arab Emirates)	3–2	(Bahrain) Manama	Al-Maktoum Stadium, Dubai
19:15		Report

7 April 2015	Kazma (Kuwait)	1–2	(United Arab Emirates) Al Nasr	Al-Maktoum Stadium, Dubai
19:30		Report

=== Group D ===
Team	Pld	W	D	L	GF	GA	GD	Pts
(Kuwait) Al Jahra	4	2	1	1	7	5	+2	7
(Bahrain) East Riffa	4	2	1	1	6	6	0	7
(Saudi Arabia) Al Faisaly	4	1	0	3	3	5	-2	3

4 February 2015	East Riffa (Bahrain)	2–4	(Kuwait) Al Jahra	Khalifa Sports City Stadium, Isa Town
18:15		Report

17 February 2015	Al Jahra (Kuwait)	1–2	(Saudi Arabia) Al Faisaly	King Salman Sport City Stadium, Al Majma'ah
18:10		Report

24 February 2015	Al Faisaly (Saudi Arabia)	1–2	(Bahrain) East Riffa	King Salman Sport City Stadium, Al Majma'ah
20:00		Report

9 March 2015	Al Jahra (Kuwait)	1–1	(Bahrain) East Riffa	Khalifa Sports City Stadium, Isa Town
18:30		Report

18 March 2015	Al Faisaly (Saudi Arabia)	0–1	(Kuwait) Al Jahra	King Salman Sport City Stadium, Al Majma'ah
20:00		Report

7 April 2015	East Riffa (Bahrain)	1–0	(Saudi Arabia) Al Faisaly	Khalifa Sports City Stadium, Isa Town
18:45		Report

== Knockout-stage ==
=== Quarter-finals ===
21 April 2015	Al Rayyan (Qatar)	2–1	(Kuwait) Kazma	Suheim Bin Hamad Stadium, Doha
18：45		Report

21 April 2015	Al Nasr (United Arab Emirates)	1–1 (4–2 p)	(Saudi Arabia) Al Taawon	Maktoum Bin Rashid Al Maktoum Stadium, Dubai
19:30		Report

22 April 2015	Al Shabab (United Arab Emirates)	3–1	(Bahrain) East Riffa	Maktoum Bin Rashid Al Maktoum Stadium, Dubai
19:30		Report

22 April 2015	Al Jahra (Kuwait)	0–2	(Oman) Al Seeb	Mubarak Al-Aiar Stadium, Jahra
18:45		Report

=== Semi-finals ===
==== First leg ====
5 May 2015	Al Nasr (United Arab Emirates)	1–1	(United Arab Emirates) Al Shabab	Al-Maktoum Stadium, Dubai
19:45		Report

6 May 2015	A Seeb (Oman)	0–0	(Qatar) Al Rayyan	Al-Seeb Stadium, Seeb
19:15		Report

==== Second leg ====
19 May 2015	Al Rayyan (Qatar)	1–1 (1–1 agg.)	(Oman) Al Seeb (a.)	Abdullah bin Khalifa Stadium, Doha
19:00		Report

19 May 2015	Al Shabab (United Arab Emirates)	2–0 (3–1 agg.)	(United Arab Emirates) Al Nasr	Maktoum Bin Rashid Al Maktoum Stadium, Dubai
19:45		Report

== Final ==
27 May 2015
19:30

Al Seeb (Oman)	1–1	(United Arab Emirates) Al Shabab
Al-Maharami 90+3'		Henrique Luvannor 83'
Penalties
	3–4

Al-Seeb Stadium, Seeb, Oman
Referee: Marai Al-Awaji (Saudi Arabia)
