= 2015 Champions League =

2015 Champions League may refer to:

== Football ==
- 2014–15 UEFA Champions League
- 2015–16 UEFA Champions League
- 2015 AFC Champions League
- 2015 CAF Champions League
- 2015 GCC Champions League

== Cricket ==
- 2015 Champions League Twenty20
