= Al Ahli Stadium =

Al Ahli Stadium may refer to:

- Hamad bin Khalifa Stadium, also known as Al Ahli SC Stadium, a multi-purpose stadium in Doha, Qatar
- Al Ahli Stadium (Bahrain), a multi-use stadium in Manama, Bahrain
