= Mahmood Abdulrahman =

Bahraini footballer

Mahmood Abdulrahman (Ringo)
Personal information
- Full name: Mahmood Abdulrahman Mohammed Noor Abdulrahman
- Date of birth: 22 November 1984 (age 41)
- Place of birth: Al Muharraq, Bahrain
- Height: 1.74 m (5 ft 9 in)
- Position: Midfielder

Team information
- Current team: Manama Club
- Number: 13

Senior career*
| Years | Team | Apps | (Gls) |
| 2004–2009 | Muharraq Club | 30 | (12) |
| 2009 | → Al Qadisiya (loan) | | |
| 2009–2010 | Al-Shamal Sports Club | 8 | (4) |
| 2010–2015 | Muharraq Club | | |
| 2015–2016 | Al-Markhiya | 6 | (2) |
| 2015– | Manama Club | | |

International career^{‡}
| 2006–2014 | Bahrain | 85 | (12) |
- * Club domestic league appearances and goals as of 13 March 2018 ‡ National team caps and goals as of 13 March 2018

Mahmood Abdulrahman Mohammed Noor Abdulrahman (Arabic: محمود عبد الرحمن; born 1984 in Muharraq), also known as Ringo, is a retired Bahraini footballer. He used to play for Manama Club as well as the Bahrain national football team. He was named Player of the tournament when Al-Muharraq won the 2008 AFC Cup.

Abdulrahman has made several appearances for the Bahrain national football team, including 14 2010 FIFA World Cup qualifying matches.

Ringo re-joined Muharraq again at 2010, and won the 2010-11 Bahraini Premier League.

== International goals ==
Scores and results list Bahrain's goal tally first.

| # | Date | Venue | Opponent | Score | Result | Competition |
|---|---|---|---|---|---|---|
| 1. | 30 June 2007 | Mỹ Đình National Stadium, Hanoi, Vietnam | Vietnam | 1–0 | 3–5 | Friendly |
| 2. | 21 October 2007 | Bahrain National Stadium, Manama, Bahrain | Malaysia | 1–0 | 4–1 | 2010 FIFA World Cup qualification |
| 3. | 20 August 2008 | Bahrain National Stadium, Manama, Bahrain | Burkina Faso | 3–1 | 3–1 | Friendly |
| 4. | 11 February 2009 | Pakhtakor Stadium, Tashkent | Uzbekistan | 1–0 | 1–0 | 2010 FIFA World Cup qualification |
| 5. | 23 March 2009 | Bahrain National Stadium, Manama Bahrain | Zimbabwe | 5–0 | 5–2 | Friendly |
| 6. | 17 June 2009 | Bahrain National Stadium, Manama, Bahrain | Uzbekistan | 1–0 | 1–0 | 2010 FIFA World Cup qualification |
| 7. | 31 August 2009 | Bahrain National Stadium, Manama, Bahrain | Iran | 2–0 | 4–2 | Friendly |
| 8. | 25 February 2010 | Tahnoun bin Mohammed Stadium, Abu Dhabi, UAE | Kuwait | 1–4 | 1–4 | Friendly |
| 9. | 29 February 2012 | Bahrain National Stadium, Manama, Bahrain | Indonesia | 3–0 | 10–0 | 2014 FIFA World Cup qualification |
| 10. | 29 February 2012 | Bahrain National Stadium, Manama, Bahrain | Indonesia | 4–0 | 10–0 | 2014 FIFA World Cup qualification |
