= King's Cup (Bahrain) =

Knockout tournament in men's football (soccer)

- Founded: 1952; 74 years ago
- Country: Bahrain
- Current champions: Muharraq Club (34th title) (2025–26)
- Most championships: Muharraq SC (34 times)
- Current: 2025–26 Bahraini King's Cup

The King's Cup is Bahrain's premier knockout tournament in men's football.

The national cup has had many different names over the years. Emir Cup (1952–59 & 1978–2002), Federation Cup (1960–77) and King's Cup (2003–present).

== Previous winners ==
Previous winners are:

- 1952 : Muharraq Club
- 1953 : Muharraq Club
- 1954 : Muharraq Club

unknown winner between 1955 and 1957

- 1958 : Muharraq Club
- 1959 : Muharraq Club
- 1960 : Al Nusoor Manama 1–0 Muharraq Club
- 1961 : Muharraq Club 4–1 Al Nusoor
- 1962 : Muharraq Club 7–1 Al Nahda
- 1963 : Muharraq Club 2–0 Bahrain Riffa
- 1964 : Muharraq Club 4–2 Al Nusoor Manama
- 1965 : no cup
- 1966 : Muharraq Club 5–0 Taj
- 1967 : Muharraq Club 1–0 Al Arabi
- 1968 : Al Nusoor Manama 2–1 Bahrain Riffa
- 1969 : Al Arabi 4–0 Al Tursana
- 1970 : Bahrain Club 5–2 Al Nusoor Manama
- 1971 : Bahrain Club 4–2 Al Arabi
- 1972 : Muharraq Club 2–0 Bahrain Club
- 1973 : Bahrain Riffa 2–2 (8 – 7) Bahrain Club
- 1974 : Muharraq Club 3–2 Al Nusoor Manama
- 1975 : Muharraq Club 5–1 Bahrain Club
- 1976 : Al Hala 1–0 Bahrain Club
- 1977 : Al Nusoor Manama 1–0 Muharraq Club
- 1978 : Muharraq Club 1–0 Al Wahda
- 1979 : Muharraq Club 1–0 Al Ahly Manama
- 1980 : Al Hala 0–0 (4 – 2) East Riffa Club
- 1981 : Al Hala 2–2 (5 – 4) Bahrain Club
- 1982 : Al Ahly Manama 2–0 Bahrain Riffa
- 1983 : Muharraq Club 2–0 Bahrain Riffa
- 1984 : Muharraq Club 2–0 Bahrain Club
- 1985 : Bahrain Riffa 1–1 (4 – 1) Bahrain Club
- 1986 : Bahrain Riffa 1–0 East Riffa Club
- 1987 : Al Ahly Manama 1–0 Al Wahda
- 1988 : Al Wahda 1–0 Al Ahly Manama
- 1989 : Muharraq Club 1–0 East Riffa Club
- 1990 : Muharraq Club
- 1991 : Al Ahly Manama
- 1992 : Al Wahda
- 1993 : Muharraq Club
- 1994 : Al Wahda
- 1995 : Muharraq Club
- 1996 : Muharraq Club (4 – 3) Bahrain Club
- 1997 : Muharraq Club 2–1 East Riffa Club
- 1998 : Bahrain Riffa 2–1 Budaiya
- 1999 : East Riffa Club 1–0 Al Hala
- 2000 : East Riffa Club 3–1 Qadisiya
- 2001 : Al Ahly Manama 1–0 Essa Town
- 2002 : Muharraq Club 0–0 (4 – 2) Al Ahly Manama
- 2003 : Al Ahly Manama 2–1 Muharraq Club
- 2004 : Al-Shabab 2–1 Busaiteen
- 2005 : Muharraq Club 1–0 (a.p.) Al-Shabab
- 2006 : Al-Najma 1–0 Al Ahly Manama
- 2007 : Al-Najma 2–0 Al Hala
- 2008 : Muharraq Club 2–0 Al-Najma
- 2009 : Muharraq Club 1–1 (9–8 pens) Riffa SC
- 2010 : Riffa SC 4–0 Busaiteen Club
- 2011 : Muharraq Club 3–0 Busaiteen Club
- 2012 : Muharraq Club 3–1 Riffa SC
- 2013 : Muharraq Club 2–2 (aet) (4–3 pens) Riffa SC
- 2014 : East Riffa SCC 2–1 (aet) Busaiteen Club
- 2015 : Al-Hidd 2–0 Busaiteen Club
- 2015–16 : Muharraq SC 3–1 Riffa SC
- 2016–17 : Manama SC 2–1 Muharraq SC
- 2017–18 : Al-Najma SC 1–1 (aet) (5–4 pens) Muharraq SC
- 2018–19 : Riffa SC 2–1 (aet) Hidd SCC
- 2019–20 : Muharraq SC 1–0 Hidd SCC
- 2020–21 : Riffa SC 2–0 Al-Ahli SC
- 2021–22 : Al-Khaldiya SC 0–0 (aet) (4–3 pens) East Riffa SCC
- 2022–23 : Al-Hala SC 0–0 (aet) (6–5 pens) Al-Ahli SC
- 2023–24 : Al-Ahli SC 1–1 (aet) (4–2 pens) Muharraq SC
- 2024–25 : Al-Khaldiya SC 3-2 Sitra Club
- 2025-26 : Muharraq SC 2-1 Riffa SC

== Top–performing clubs ==
Club	Champions
Muharraq SC	34
Al-Ahli SC	9 (3 as Al Nusoor Manama)
Riffa SC	7
Al-Najma SC	7 (3 as Al Wahda and 1 as Al-Arabi)
Al-Hala SC	4
East Riffa SCC	3
Bahrain SC	2
Al-Khaldiya SC	2
Al-Shabab	1
Hidd SCC	1
Manama SC	1
