= Ahmed Al Hujairi =

Bahraini footballer

Personal information
- Full name: Ahmed Ebrahim Yusuf Al Hujairi
- Date of birth: 1 February 1978 (age 48)
- Place of birth: Bahrain
- Height: 1.83 m (6 ft 0 in)
- Position: Defender

Team information
- Current team: Al-Ahli

Senior career*
Years	Team	Apps	(Gls)
2005–present	Al-Ahli		

International career
2005	Bahrain	3	(1)
- * Club domestic league appearances and goals as of 20 November 2008

Ahmed Ebrahim Yusuf Al Hujairi (born February 1, 1978) is a Bahraini footballer. He currently plays for Al-Ahli of Bahrain as well as the Bahrain national football team.

== National team career statistics ==
=== Goals for Senior National Team ===
#	Date	Venue	Opponent	Score	Result	Competition
	October 27, 2005	Manama, Bahrain	Panama	5-0	Won	Friendly
