= Jeremias Carlos David =

Dutch footballer (born 1993)

Personal information
- Date of birth: 7 April 1993 (age 33)
- Place of birth: Luanda, Angola
- Height: 1.77 m (5 ft 10 in)
- Position: Forward

Senior career*
| Years | Team | Apps | (Gls) |
| 2011–2014 | Helmond Sport | 14 | (0) |
| 2014 | Al-Ahli | | |
| 2015–2017 | Helmondia | | |
| 2017–2018 | Gemert | | |
| 2018–2021 | NWC Asten | | |
- * Club domestic league appearances and goals

Jeremias Carlos David (born 7 April 1993) is a Dutch retired footballer who played as a forward.

== Career ==
Carlos David started his senior career with Helmond Sport in the Dutch Eerste Divisie, where he made sixteen appearances and scored zero goals. After that, he played for Al Ahli Manama, Greenock Morton (on trial), SC Helmondia, VV Gemert, and NWC Asten.

After retiring as a player, David started his own street food restaurant in Eindhoven.
