= 27th GCC Champions League =

2012 GCC Champions League
دوري أبطال مجلس التعاون الخليجي

Tournament details
- Dates: 16 February – 10 June
- Teams: 12 (from AFC/UAFA) confederations)

Final positions
- Champions: (Bahrain) Al-Muharraq (1st title)
- Runners-up: (United Arab Emirates) Al-Wasl

Tournament statistics
- Matches played: 34
- Goals scored: 102 (3 per match)

The 27th GCC Champions League (Arabic: دوري أبطال مجلس التعاون الخليجي) was the 27th edition of the GCC Champions League for clubs of the Gulf Cooperation Council nations, held in 2012.

== The groups ==
Four groups of three teams.

Top two from each group qualify for the one legged quarter finals with group winners hosting the matches.

Group A	Group B	Group C	Group D
(Kuwait) Al-Jahra (Bahrain) Al-Muharraq (Oman) Fanja	Al-Arabi Kuwait (Qatar) Al-Kharitiyat (United Arab Emirates) Al-Wahda	(Qatar) Al-Khor (Kuwait) Al-Naser (Bahrain) Busaiteen	(Oman) Al-Nahda (Bahrain) Al-Riffa (United Arab Emirates) Al-Wasl

== Groups ==
=== Group A ===
Team	Pld	W	D	L	GF	GA	GD	Pts
(Bahrain) Al-Muharraq	4	3	0	1	7	1	+6	9
(Kuwait) Al-Jahra	4	1	2	1	4	4	0	5
(Oman) Fanja	4	0	2	2	3	9	–6	2

16 February 2012
18:10

Al Jahra FC (Kuwait)	2–2	(Oman) Fanja SC
Alexandre Nino 28', 90'		Mohammed Al-Mashari 72'; Iskandar Ahmad 90+2'

Al Shabab Mubarak Alaiar Stadium, Jahra
Referee: Khamis al-Marri (Qatar)

6 March 2012
18:25

Al Muharraq SC (Bahrain)	1–0	(Kuwait) Al Jahra FC
Ismail Abdullatif 90+2'		André Macanga (red card)

Al Muharraq Stadium, Arad
Referee: Fahad Banihammad (UAE)

20 March 2012

Fanja (Oman)	0–3	(Bahrain) Al-Muharraq

3 April 2012

Fanja (Oman)	1–1	(Kuwait) Al-Jahra

18 April 2012

Al-Jahra (Kuwait)	1–0	(Bahrain) Al-Muharraq

2 May 2012

Al-Muharraq (Bahrain)	3–0	(Oman) Fanja

=== Group B ===
Team	Pld	W	D	L	GF	GA	GD	Pts
Al-Arabi Kuwait	4	3	0	1	11	4	+7	9
(United Arab Emirates) Al-Wahda	4	2	0	2	6	8	–2	6
(Qatar) Al-Kharitiyat	4	1	0	3	3	8	–5	3

20 February 2012
18:15

Al Kharitiyath SC (Qatar)	0–2	(United Arab Emirates) Al Wahda SCC
		Ismail Matar 58'; Fernando Baiano 65'

Suhaim bin Hamad Stadium, Doha
Referee: Ali Abdulnabi (Bahrain)

6 March 2012
18:20

Al Wahda SCC (United Arab Emirates)	1–2	(Kuwait) Al-Arabi SC
Ismail Matar 72'; Mubarak al-Mansouri (red card)		Hussain Al-Moussawi 56', 63'

Al Nahyan Stadium, Abu Dhabi
Referee: Fahad Jaber al-Marri (Qatar)

20 March 2012

Al-Arabi Kuwait	3–0	(Qatar) Al-Kharitiyat

3 April 2012

Al-Wahda (United Arab Emirates)	2–1	(Qatar) Al-Kharitiyat

17 April 2012

Al-Kharitiyat (Qatar)	2–1	Al-Arabi Kuwait

2 May 2012

Al-Arabi Kuwait	5–1	(United Arab Emirates) Al-Wahda

=== Group C ===
Team	Pld	W	D	L	GF	GA	GD	Pts
(Qatar) Al-Khor	4	3	0	1	6	3	+3	9
(Kuwait) Al-Naser	4	1	1	2	6	6	0	4
(Bahrain) Busaiteen	4	1	1	2	5	8	–3	4

21 February 2012
18:00

Al Nasr SC (Kuwait)	0–1	(Qatar) Al Khor SC
		Júlio César 43'

Ali Al-Salem Al-Sabah Stadium, Al Farwaniyah
Referee: Abdullah al-A'ajil (UAE)

6 March 2012
18:30

Al Khor SC (Qatar)	2–0	(Bahrain) Busaiteen Club

Al-Khawr Stadium, Al Khor

20 March 2012

Busaiteen (Bahrain)	1–3	(Kuwait) Al-Naser

2 April 2012

Al-Khor (Qatar)	2–1	(Kuwait) Al-Naser

16 April 2012

Busaiteen (Bahrain)	2–1	(Qatar) Al-Khor

1 May 2012

Al-Naser (Kuwait)	2–2	(Bahrain) Busaiteen

=== Group D ===
Team	Pld	W	D	L	GF	GA	GD	Pts
(United Arab Emirates) Al-Wasl	4	4	0	0	11	4	+7	12
(Bahrain) Al-Riffa	4	1	1	2	6	8	–2	4
(Oman) Al-Nahda	4	0	1	3	6	11	–5	1

17 February 2012
18:15

Riffa SC (Bahrain)	3–1	(Oman) Al-Nahda
Salman Isa 35'; Adam Abu Bakr 37', 77'		Hilal Nasr al-Khanbashi 60'; Hugues-Wilfried Da (penalty missed)

Bahrain National Stadium, Riffa
Referee: Waleed al-Shatti (Kuwait)

6 March 2012
18:00

Al-Nahda (Oman)	0–2	(United Arab Emirates) Al-Wasl

Nizwa Sports Complex, Nizwa

20 March 2012

Al-Wasl (United Arab Emirates)	3–1	(Bahrain) Al-Riffa

4 April 2012

Al-Riffa (Bahrain)	0–2	(United Arab Emirates) Al-Wasl

18 April 2012

Al-Nahda (Oman)	2–2	(Bahrain) Al-Riffa

1 May 2012

Al-Wasl (United Arab Emirates)	4–3	(Oman) Al-Nahda

== Quarter finals ==
15 May 2012

Al-Khor (Qatar)	1–0	(Kuwait) Al-Jahra

15 May 2012

Al-Wasl (United Arab Emirates)	1–1	(United Arab Emirates) Al-Wahda
Penalties
	5–3

15 May 2012

Al-Muharraq (Bahrain)	3–0	(Kuwait) Al-Naser

15 May 2012

Al-Arabi Kuwait	2–1	(Bahrain) Al-Riffa

== Semi finals ==
=== 1st legs ===
23 May 2012

Al-Wasl (United Arab Emirates)	3–0	(Qatar) Al-Khor

23 May 2012

Al-Arabi Kuwait	2–1	(Bahrain) Al-Muharraq

=== 2nd legs ===
29 May 2012

Al-Khor (Qatar)	2–1	(United Arab Emirates) Al-Wasl

Al Wasl advanced to the final 4–2 on aggregate

29 May 2012

Al-Muharraq (Bahrain)	2–0	Al-Arabi Kuwait

Al Muharraq advanced to the final 3–2 on aggregate

== Final ==
=== 1st leg ===
5 June 2012

Al-Muharraq (Bahrain)	1–3	(United Arab Emirates) Al-Wasl

=== 2nd leg ===
10 June 2012

Al-Wasl (United Arab Emirates)	1–3	(Bahrain) Al-Muharraq

Al Muharraq became champions, winning on penalties, the first team from Bahrain to be crowned champions.

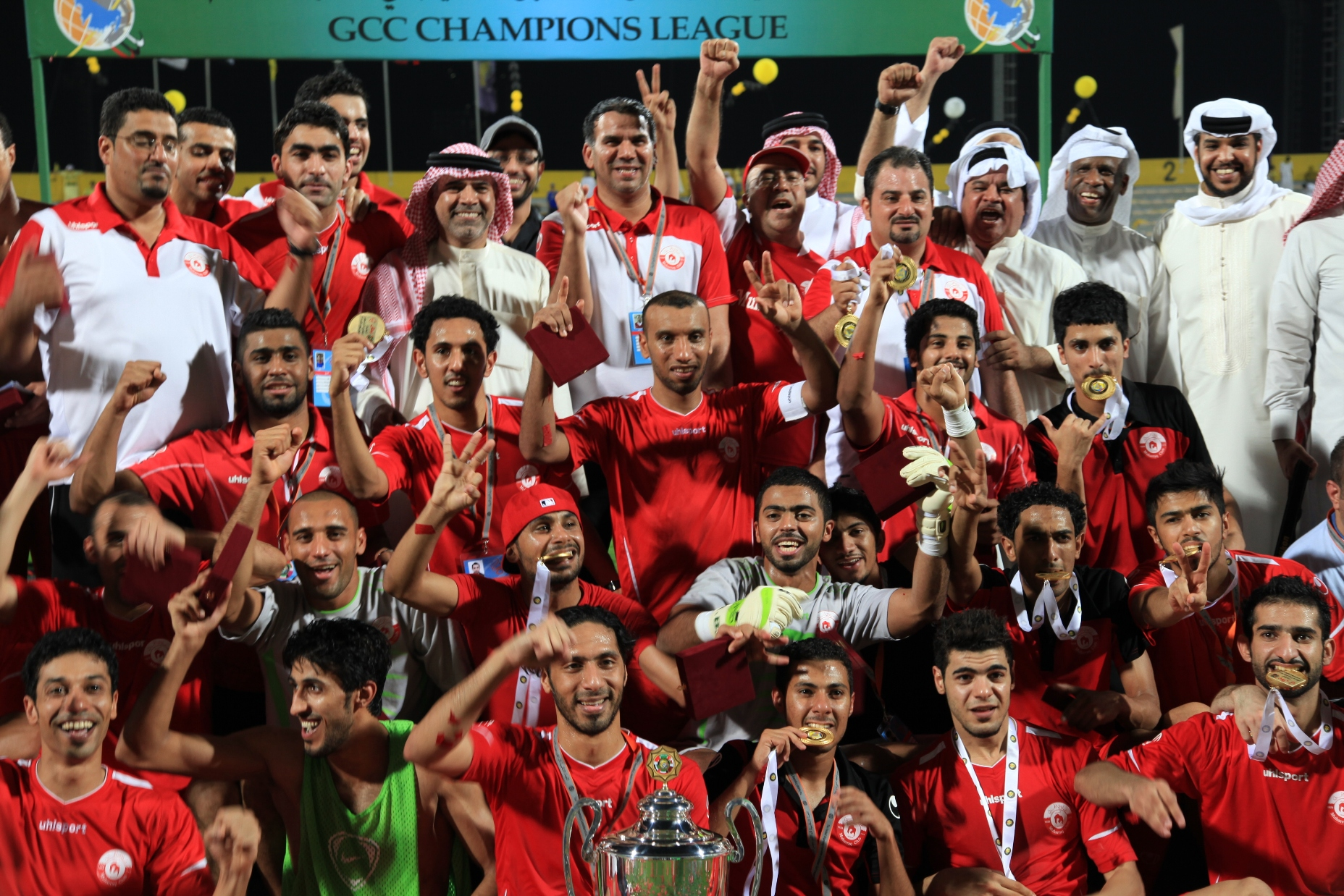
