= Diego Silva (footballer, born 1982) =

Brazilian footballer

Personal information
- Full name: Diego Pélicles da Silva
- Date of birth: 23 October 1982 (age 44)
- Place of birth: Natal, Brazil
- Height: 1.81 m (5 ft 11 in)
- Position: Forward

Team information
- Current team: Força e Luz

Senior career*
Years	Team	Apps	(Gls)
2003–2007	América (RN)		
2006	→ Baraúnas (loan)	5	(0)
2007	→ Londrina (loan)		
2007–2010	Aalesunds FK	69	(15)
2010–2011	Al-Ahli Manama	18	(14)
2011–2012	Muharraq Club		
2012–2013	Åtvidabergs FF		
2013	Botafogo-PB	2	(0)
2013	Olympic Safi	7	(3)
2014	Gwangju FC	14	(3)
2014	Arapongas	0	(0)
2015–2016	Al-Ahli Manama		
2016–2017	Al Hala		
2017–2018	Força e Luz	0	(0)
2018	Operário-MT	0	(0)
2018	Baraúnas	0	(0)
2019	Palmeira	0	(0)
2020–	Força e Luz	0	(0)
- * Club domestic league appearances and goals as of 20:39, 24 May 2020 (UTC)

Diego Pélicles da Silva (23 October 1982) is a Brazilian professional footballer who plays for Centro Esportivo Força e Luz as a forward.

== Career ==
Born in Natal, capital of Rio Grande do Norte state, Diego Silva started his career at hometown club América (RN). He played twice in 2003 Copa do Brasil. He finished as the runner-up of 2005 Campeonato Brasileiro Série C and promoted to Série B. He was loaned to Baraúnas in the mid way of 2006 Campeonato Brasileiro Série B in July 2006. With Baraúnas, the team failed to qualify to the next round of 2006 Campeonato Brasileiro Série C and returned to América early, in August. Which América finished as the 4th and promoted again.

In January 2007 he was loaned to Londrina for 2007 Campeonato Paranaense. In June, he was transferred to Aalesund.

Diego Silva agreed to move to Bahraini club Al-Ahli on 10 September 2010 for $120,000 making him the biggest amount paid in the history of the club.

On 31 August 2012, he signed for Swedish Allsvenskan club Åtvidabergs FF.
