= Al-Arabi (Bahraini football club) =

Al-Arabi (Arabic: نادي العربي) was a Bahraini men's football club that participated in the Bahraini Premier League and Bahraini King's Cup during the 1960s and 1970s.

== History ==
Al-Arabi won one Bahraini King's Cup 4–0 in 1969 against Al Tursana (later merged with Al-Ahli). They also won the 1974–75 Bahraini Premier League.

However, another franchise of Al-Arabi formed from mergers of several clubs with Al Ittifaq Daraz in 1984.
