= Bahraini FA Cup =

- Founded: 2000; 26 years ago
- Country: Bahrain
- Current champions: Manama SC (2 titles) (2024)
- Most championships: Muharraq SC (5 titles)
- Current: 2024–25

The Bahraini FA Cup is a Bahrain knockout tournament in men's football.

== Previous winners ==
- 2000 : Al-Riffa (known as West Riffa) 3–0 Al Ahli
- 2001 : Al-Riffa
- 2002 : not held
- 2003 : Busaiteen 0–0 Al-Riffa (aet, 5–4 pen)
- 2004 : Al-Riffa 3–1 Busaiteen
- 2005 : Al-Muharraq 2–1 Busaiteen
- 2006 : not held
- 2007 : Al Ahli 1–1 Al-Najma (aet, 4–3 pen)
- 2008 : not held
- 2009 : Al-Muharraq 1–0 Al-Najma
- 2010 : not held
- 2011 : not held
- 2012 : not held
- 2013 : not held
- 2014 : Riffa SC 2–0 Bahrain SC
- 2015 : Hidd SCC 2–0 East Riffa SCC
- 2016 : Al-Ahli SC 1–1 Malkiya SCC (aet, 3–1 pen)
- 2017 : Hidd SCC 1–1 Malkiya SCC (aet, 8–7 pen)
- 2018 : not held
- 2019 : East Riffa SCC 3–1 Al-Ahli SC
- 2020 : Muharraq SC 4–1 Busaiteen SC
- 2021 : Muharraq SC 2–1 East Riffa SCC
- 2022 : Muharraq SC 1–1 Hidd SCC (aet, 1–0 pen)
- 2023 : Manama SC 2-2 Al-Khaldiya SC (aet, 5–4 pen)
- 2024 : Manama SC 1-0 Al-Shabab

== Top-Performing Clubs ==
Club	Champions
Muharraq SC	5
Riffa SC	4
Al-Ahli SC	2
Hidd SCC	2
Manama SC	2
Busaiteen SC	1
East Riffa SCC	1
