= Bahraini Super Cup =

- Founded: 2006
- Region: Bahrain
- Teams: 2
- Current champions: Al-Khaldiya SC (4th title)
- Most championships: Al-Khaldiya SC (4 titles)
- 2023 Bahraini Super Cup

The Bahraini Super Cup is the curtain raiser to the Bahrain football season.

== Previous winners ==
- 2006 : Al-Muharraq SC 3-2 Al-Najma
- 2007 : Al-Najma 3-2 Al-Riffa SC
- 2008 : Al-Najma 1-0 Busaiteen Club
- 2013 : Al-Muharraq SC 2-1 Busaiteen Club
- 2014 : East Riffa SCC 1-1 (6-5 penalty kicks) Al-Riffa SC
- 2015 : Hidd SCC 1-1 (6-5 penalty kicks) Al-Muharraq SC
- 2016 : Hidd SCC 1-0 Al-Muharraq SC
- 2017 : Manama SC 1-1 (4-2 penalty kicks) Malkiya SCC
- 2018 : Muharraq SC 2-2 (4-3 penalty kicks) Al-Najma SCC
- 2019 : Riffa SC 1-1 (5-3 penalty kicks) Manama SC
- 2020 :
- 2021 : Riffa SC 1-1 (4-3 penalty kicks) East Riffa SCC
- 2022-23 : Al-Khaldiya SC 2-0 Riffa SC
- 2023-24 : Al-Khaldiya SC 2–0 Al-Hala SC
- 2024-25: Al-Khaldiya SC 5-2 Al Ahli Club
- 2025-26: Al-Khaldiya SC 3-0 Muharraq SC

== Top-Performing Clubs ==
Club	Champions
Al-Khaldiya SC	4
Muharraq SC	3
Riffa SC	2
Al-Najma SCC	2
Hidd SCC	2
East Riffa SCC	1
Manama SC	1
