= Malkiya, Bahrain =

Malkiya المالكية
- Village
- Location in Bahrain
- Coordinates: 26°6′3″N 50°29′16″E
- Country: Bahrain
- Governorate: Northern Governorate

Population (2000)
  - Total: 14,800

Malkiya (Arabic: المالكية) is a coastal village that lies on the western coast of Bahrain Island in Bahrain. The village is home to the Malkiya Club football team.

In 2007, protests broke out in the area when a powerful member of the Bahraini royal family tried to seize some of the coastline of the village.

The village is also home to the grave and shrine of Zayd ibn Suhan, one of the companions of Ali.
