= Galali, Bahrain =

Coordinates: 26°16′N 50°39′E

Galali (in local dialect) or Qalali in Classical Arabic (Arabic: قلالي) is a small area in the Kingdom of Bahrain, located on Muharraq Island, north of Muharraq City. Galali used to be the northernmost point of Bahrain before the development of the artificial islands of Amwaj Islands.

Around 2000 people used to live in Galali (1991 census). Today, Galali is 16 times bigger than it was 25 years ago because of reclamation of sea it is now at 68k people and its size is 10km².

The inhabitants of the village are mostly Sunni Arabs, Arabized Persians, and African-Bahrainis.

Before the discovery of oil in Bahrain, most of the town's inhabitants were seamen who were involved in the pearl diving and fishing industry.

Between 1920 and 1925, many people got infected with plague that was the reason that led to the migration of population from the area, making it empty, but after several years the population returned.

== Etymology ==
Galali refers to a group of cliffs in dialectal Arabic.

== Education ==
The Ministry of Education operates government schools. Galali Primary Boys School and Roquya Primary Girls School are in Galali.
