= Budaiya =

Budaiya البديع
- Town
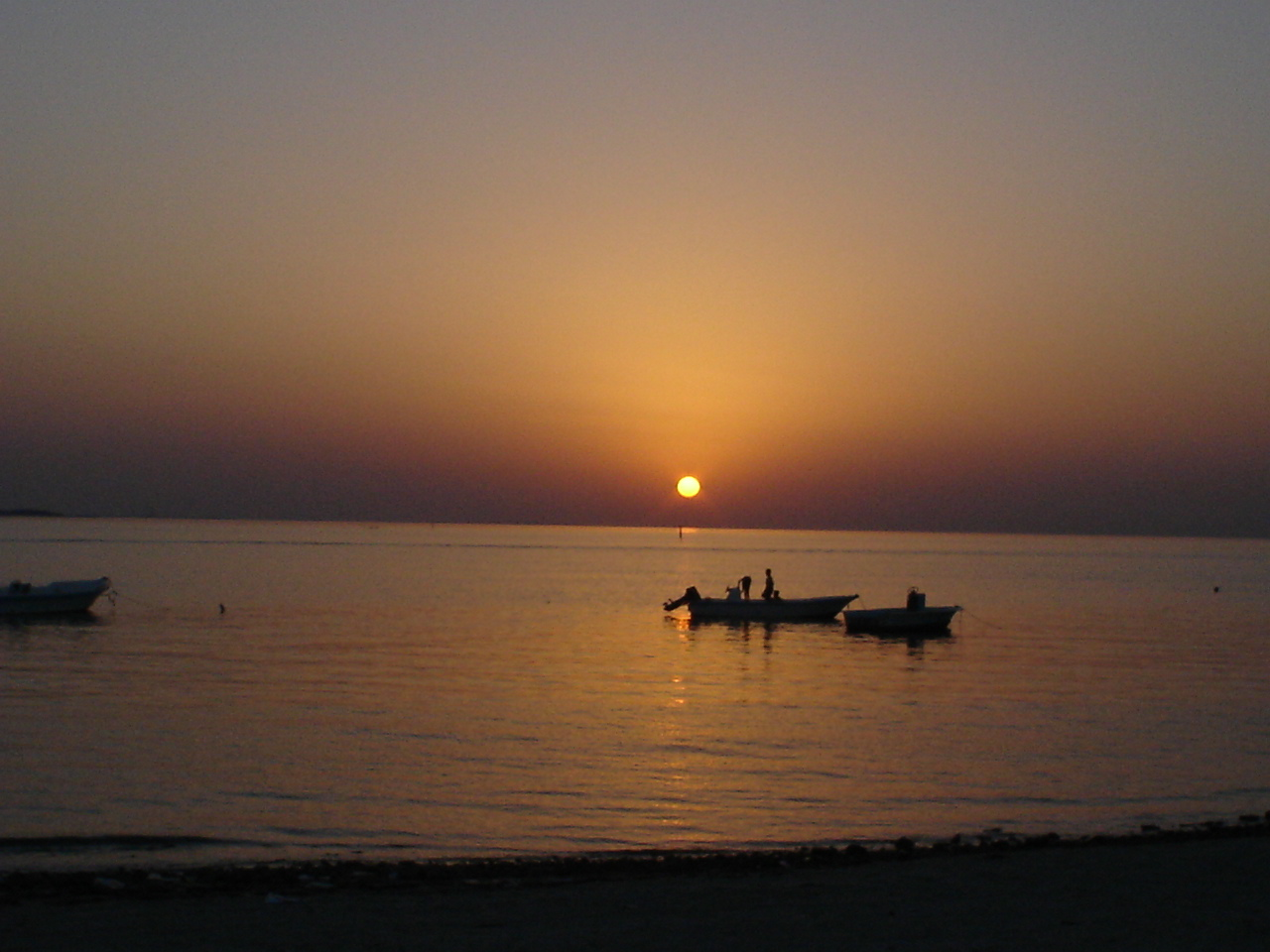
- A View of Budaiya Beach

- Location in Bahrain
- Coordinates: 26°12′46″N 50°26′50″E
- Country: Bahrain
- Governorate: Northern Governorate
- Settled: 19th century

Al Budaiya (Arabic: البديع) is a coastal town located in the northwestern region of Bahrain Island, in the Northern Governorate of the Kingdom of Bahrain. It neighbors the villages of Diraz and Bani Jamra.

== History ==
The town was founded by the Dawasiri tribe, but most of the tribe left en masse to mainland Saudi Arabia in 1923, after conflict emerged with the British colonial authorities. Many Dawasir tribe members later returned to Budaiya, with some still living in the village today. Prior to the discovery of oil in Bahrain, most Budaiya residents were involved in the pearl diving and fishing industry.

According to the Gazetteer of the Persian Gulf, Oman and Central Arabia in 1917, Budaiya village was made up of three distinct quarters; Fariq-al Amarah, Fariq-al Dam (located on Ras-Budaiya) and Fariq-al Budaiya (the oldest quarter). The town had considerable numbers of stone houses and reed huts. The estimated population was 8,000, all thought to be adherents of Sunni Islam; 800 houses belonged to the Dawasir tribe, 100 to the Amarah tribe, 50 to the Huwala, 200 to "free negroes" and around 450 houses for black slaves. The port was home to more than 100 boats, over half of which were utilised for pearling. There were also 3 Qur'anic schools in the town. The internal affairs of the town were handled by the Shaikh of the Dawasir, without interference from the Shaikh of Bahrain.

== Geography ==
Budaiya traditionally received its water supply from wells in the adjacent date plantations in the villages of Diraz and Bani Jamra. It is now the location of most farms, stables, and traditional gulf family farms/retreats nakhal. The town serves as one end-point of the Budaiya Road, which runs to Manama. The regions on either side of road are colloquially referred to as Budaiya.

The biggest problem that the Budaiya Road region faces is deforestation due to a wave of construction, and the seeping of sea water into natural underground aquifers as a result of the pre-construction building process of the Mina Salman seaport in the 1950s. Budaiya Road is still remembered as one of the only "naturally shaded" parts of Bahrain where thousands of wild palm trees acted as filters from the hot, glaring desert sun. Most of the trees were cut down to expand the route and 'modernize' the area.
