= Al Ahli Stadium (Bahrain) =

Sports venue in Manama, Bahrain

- Interactive map of Al Ahli Stadium
- Location: Manama, Bahrain
- Coordinates: 26°12′21″N 50°34′29″E
- Capacity: 10,000

Tenant
- Al-Ahli

Al Ahli Stadium is a multi-use stadium in the Zinj district of the city of Manama, in Bahrain. It is currently used mostly for football matches and is the home ground of Al-Ahli. The stadium holds 10,000 people. The stadium also occasionally hosts concerts.
