= Al Hidd =

Al Hidd الحدّ
- Town
- Aerial photograph of Hidd in 2024.

- Location in Bahrain
- Coordinates: 26°15′N 50°39′E
- Country: Bahrain
- Governorate: Muharraq Governorate

To be distinguished from Ras al Hadd (رأس الحد), a district with a famous turtle breeding beach in Oman

Al Hidd (Arabic: الحد; transliterated: Al-Ḥidd) is a town in Bahrain, located on a sand spit on the southeastern extremity of Muharraq Island. The town, which has a large native Sunni population, is well known for its rich sea crabs as well as its clear blue seas. Before the discovery of oil in Bahrain, the inhabitants of Hidd were largely involved in the fishing or pearl diving industries. Many of Bahrain's fijiri performance groups are based in Hidd.

Al Hidd is considered a very religiously and culturally conservative area of Bahrain, with many of the town's firjan, or neighborhoods, being composed of old buildings.

== Geography ==
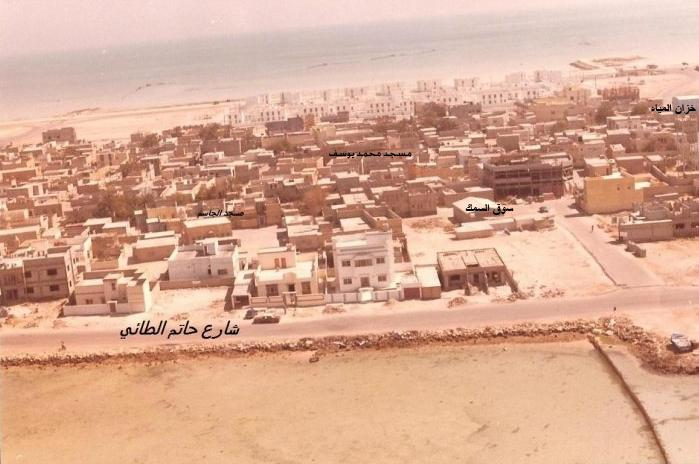
Historical photo of Hidd.

Al Hidd lies south of the Bahrain International Airport and the town of Arad. Situated close by is East Hidd City, a large public housing project under construction. The Shaikh Khalifa Causeway connects Hidd to Juffair on Bahrain Island. The altitude of Al Hidd is 3m.

== Government and infrastructure ==
Hidd used to be administered under its own municipality, but today it falls under the Muharraq Governorate.

To the south of Hidd lies the Hidd Industrial Area, built on newly reclaimed land. In addition to several factories, the Industrial Area is the site of a large power plant, a water desalination plant (which supplies 75% of Bahrain's clean water requirements), and a drydock (Arab Shipbuilding and Repair Yard or ASRY). The Office of Ports and Maritime Affairs of the Ministry of Transportation has its headquarters in Building 702 in Hidd.

== Education ==
The Ministry of Education operates public government schools. Government schools for boys include Al-Hidd Primary Intermediate Boys School and South Hidd Primary Boys School. Government schools for girls include Asma That Al-Nequin Primary Intermediate Girls School and Al-Hadd Secondary Girls School.
