= Khalifa Sports City Stadium =

Multi-use stadium in Isa Town, Bahrain

- Interactive map of Khalifa Sports City Stadium
- Location: Isa Town, Bahrain
- Coordinates: 26°10′29″N 50°32′56″E
- Capacity: 15,000

Construction
- Opened: 1968
- Renovated: 2007
- Cost: 24.4 million

Khalifa Sports City Stadium, also known as Isa Town Stadium, is a multi-use stadium in Isa Town, Bahrain. It is currently used mostly for association football. The stadium holds 15,000 people and was opened in 1968. It was last renovated in 2007.

== Facilities ==
The stadium underwent a $24.4 million (9.2 million BHD) renovation in 2007 that incorporated natural grass on the main football pitch and constructing a new main stand that can carry 3,600 spectators. Another multipurpose sport hall was constructed with a capacity for 3,600 spectators. This hall can host handball, badminton, basketball and volleyball matches. An Olympic size swimming wall with a stand for 500 spectators was also built in addition to a 5-metre diving pool. The expansion was designed by Tilke and Partners.

== History ==
The stadium hosted nine games of the 21st Arabian Gulf Cup in 2013.

== Notable matches ==
23 March 2015	Bahrain	0–0	Yemen	Isa Town, Bahrain
				Stadium: Khalifa Sports City Stadium; Attendance: 2,200; Referee: Ali Sabah Adday Al-Qaysi (Iraq)

29 March 2022 Friendly	Bahrain	0–1	Belarus	Isa Town, Bahrain
			Solovey 45+1'	Stadium: Khalifa Sports City Stadium
