= Hidd SCC =

Al Hidd Club
- Full name: Al Hidd Sports and Cultural Club
- Nickname: Tsunami
- Founded: 1945; 81 years ago
- Ground: Bahrain National Stadium; Riffa
- Capacity: 24,000
- Chairman: Ahmed bin Salman Al Muslem
- League: Premier League
- 2025–26: 6th of 12
Home colours	Away colours

Al-Hidd Sports and Cultural Club (Arabic: نادي الحد الرياضي الثقافي) is a Bahraini football club based in Al Hidd, Muharraq Island. They currently compete in the Bahraini Premier League, the top division of Bahraini football league. Hidd SCC also operates a futsal team, which competes in Bahrain Futsal League.

== Current squad ==
=== First-team squad ===
As of the 2023–24 season.

Note: Flags indicate national team as defined under FIFA eligibility rules; some limited exceptions apply. Players may hold more than one non-FIFA nationality.

No.	Pos.	Nation	Player
1	GK	BHR	Ali Khalifa
2	DF	BHR	Mohamed Isa Abdullah
3	DF	BRA	Tallysson
4	DF	BHR	Hani Taha
5	MF	BHR	Hesham Bayem
6	MF	NED	Tarik Kada
8	MF	BHR	Mohammed Al-Tayeb
9	FW	BHR	Ali Muneer
11	FW	BHR	Saad Al Ameer
12	DF	BHR	Ahmed Falamarzi
13	FW	BHR	Abdulla Ali
14	MF	BHR	Abdulla Al Ajmi
15	DF	BHR	Kameel Al-Adhem
16	MF	BHR	Nawaf Abdullah

No.	Pos.	Nation	Player
17	MF	BHR	Mohamed Musabah
18	FW	BHR	Mohamed Qambar
19	DF	MAR	Ismail Lagrayei
20	FW	BHR	Adnan Fawez
22	GK	BHR	Khalid Buhazza
23	MF	BHR	Salman Yunes Amin
27	DF	TUN	Hamza Hammami
28	DF	BHR	Khaled Al Samhari
29	FW	CGO	Jacques Themopele
30	DF	BHR	Talal Al Shurouqi
41	DF	BHR	Ahmed Habib
—	DF	JOR	Bara' Marei
—	FW	JOR	Mohammad Aleikish

== Achievements ==
- Bahraini Premier League: 2

2015–16, 2019–20

- Bahraini King's Cup: 1

2015

- Bahraini FA Cup: 2

2015, 2017

- Bahraini Super Cup: 2

2015, 2016

- Bahraini Elite Cup : 1

2018

== Performance in international competitions ==
=== Performance in UAFA competitions ===
- UAFA Cup: 1 appearance

2012–13: Second Round

=== Performance in AFC competitions ===
- AFC Cup: 5 appearances

2014: Quarter-finals
2015: Group stage
2016: Group stage
2017: Group stage
2021: Group stage
