= Sitra Club =

Sports club based in Sitra, Bahrain

- Full name: Sitra Cultural & Sports Club
- Founded: 1957; 69 years ago
- Ground: Bahrain National Stadium; Riffa
- Capacity: 24,000
- Chairman: Ali Ahmed Habib
- Manager: Abdulaziz Abdo
- League: Premier League
- 2025–26: Premier League, 8th of 12
Home colours	Away colours

Sitra Club (Arabic: نادي سترة الثقافي والرياضي) is a sports club based in Sitra, Bahrain. The club was established in 1957. It is best known for their football team.
