= Al-Najma SC (Bahrain) =

Bahraini multi-sports club

- Full name: Al-Najma Sports Club
- Nicknames: Al-Raheeb, The White Horse
- Founded: 1946; 80 years ago
- Ground: Al Najma Club Stadium; Juffair, Manama, Khalifa Sports City Stadium; Isa Town, Southern Governorate, Al Ahli Stadium; Manama, Capital Governorate, Al Ahli Stadium; Manama, Capital Governorate, Al Muharraq Stadium; Arad, Al Muharraq, Muharraq Governorate, Al Muharraq Stadium; Arad Al Muharraq, Muharraq Governorate, Bahrain National Stadium; Isa Town, Southern Governorate
- Chairman: Sheikh Abdul Rahman bin Mubarak Al Khalifa
- Manager: Ismaeel Karami
- League: Premier League
- 2025–26: Premier League, 10th of 12
Home colours	Away colours

Al-Najma SC (Arabic: نادي النجمة) is a Bahraini professional multi-sports club based in Manama. Incorporated in 1946, the club has departments of football, handball, volleyball and basketball. The club's football section competes in the Bahraini Premier League, the top-flight of Bahraini football.

== History ==
Al-Najma Club was merged with Al Wahda, which won the Bahraini King's Cup in 1988, 1992 and 1994, and Al-Arabi, which won the Bahraini King's Cup in 1969 and the 1974–75 Bahraini Premier League; then with Al-Hilal, Al-Qadisiya, which played the Bahraini King's Cup final in 2000, and Ras Al-Rumman in 2002.

== Football ==
=== Partners ===
Diyar Al Muharraq Kuwait Finance House Macron

=== Achievements ===
- Bahraini Premier League: 1

1974–1975

- Bahraini King's Cup: 7

1969, 1988, 1992, 1994, 2006, 2007, 2018

- Bahraini Super Cup: 2

2007, 2008

=== Performance in AFC competitions ===
- AFC Cup: 2 appearances

2008: Group Stage
2019: Group Stage

=== Performance in UAFA Competitions ===
- Gulf Club Champions Cup: 1 appearance
  2008: Group Stage

=== Continental record ===
Season	Competition	Round	Club	Home	Away	Aggregate
2008	AFC Cup	Group C	(Oman) Al-Nahda	3–3	0–0	3rd
2008	AFC Cup	Group C	(Jordan) Shabab Al-Ordon	0–0	3–2	3rd
2008	AFC Cup	Group C	(Yemen) Al-Sha'ab Hadramaut	2–1	0–0	3rd
2019	AFC Cup	Group B	(Jordan) Al-Jazeera	1–1	3–0	3rd
2019	AFC Cup	Group B	(Syria) Al-Ittihad	2–1	1–2	3rd
2019	AFC Cup	Group B	Al-Kuwait	0–1	2–1	3rd

=== Rivalries ===
Al-Ahli Club is considered to be Al Najma's fiercest rival. The two teams contest the derby called The Capital's Derby. Both teams are considered to be the most decorated in the capital city. However, Al Najma fans are also known to have friendly relations towards Muharraq fans. Sometimes Al Najma fans could be spotted attending Muharraq matches and vice versa, when their own club is no longer in contention for the title.

== Handball ==
Al-Najma SC
- Full name: Al-Najma Sports Club
- Nickname(s): Al-Raheeb; The White Horse
- Founded: 1946; 80 years ago
- Arena: Khalifa Sport City's Hall; Isa Town, Southern Governorate, Isa Bin Reshid Hall; Isa Town, Southern Governorate, Bahrain Handball Federation Hall; Umm al Hassam, Manama, Capital Governorate
- President: His Excellency Sheikh Abdul Rahman bin Mubarak Al Khalifa
- Head coach: Sayed Ali Al-Falahi
- Captain: Husain Al-Sayyad
- Club colours
Home	Away

The Al-Najma Club SC (handball) (Arabic: نادي النجمة) is a Bahraini multi-sports club based in Manama. The club has departments of handball team of Bahrain and is controlled by the Bahrain Handball Federation. In November 2019 Ali Sayed Al-Falahi returned to his position as head coach.

=== Partners ===
Diyar Al Muharraq Kuwait Finance House Macron Erima

=== IHF Men's Super Globe ===
Year	Round	Position
(Qatar) 2018	quarterfinals	7
(Saudi Arabia) 2023	quarterfinals	8

=== GCC Club Handball Champions ===
Year	Round	Position
(United Arab Emirates) 1984	Final	1
(Bahrain) 1985	Final	1
(United Arab Emirates) 1990	Final	1
(Qatar) 1998	Final	1
(Bahrain) 2004	Final	2
(United Arab Emirates) 2006	Final	2
(Bahrain) 2007	Bronze Medal Match	4
(Saudi Arabia) 2008	Bronze Medal Match	4
(Kuwait) 2022	Final	1
(Bahrain) 2023	Final	2

=== Asian Men's Club League Handball Championship ===
Year	Round	Position
(Iran) 2001	Bronze Medal Match	3
(United Arab Emirates) 2003	Bronze Medal Match	4
(Jordan) 2009	preliminary round	9
(Qatar) 2015	Bronze Medal Match	3
(India) 2017	Final	1
(Saudi Arabia) 2021	Bronze Medal Match	4
(India) 2022	Final	2
(Iran) 2023	Final	1
(Kuwait) 2024		
(Kuwait) 2026		
(Saudi Arabia) 2028		

=== Current squad ===
Squad

Head coach: Sayed Ali Al-Falahi

Goalkeepers

- 16 (Bahrain) Hamad Shamlan
- 21 (Bahrain) Mohamed Abdulhusain
- 23 (Bahrain) Ali Anwar Mohamed

Left wingers

- 15 (Bahrain) Adel Mohamed
- 89 (Bahrain) Mahdi Saad

Right wingers

- 27 (Bahrain) Bilal Basham Askani
- 33 (Bahrain) Ali Ali Fuad

Line players

- 19 (Bahrain) Mohamed Merza
- 88 (Bahrain) Hasan Al-Fardan

Left backs

- 13 (Bahrain) Khaled Mohamed
- 14 (Bahrain) Abdulla Abdulkarim
- 66 (Bahrain) Komail Mahfoodh

Central backs

- 3 (Bahrain) Ali Abdulla Eid
- 11 (Bahrain) Mahmoud Ali
- 95 (Bahrain) Mohamed Mohamed
- 99 (Bahrain) Husain Al-Sayyad (c)

Right backs

- 18 (Bahrain) Husain Mohamed
- 28 (Bahrain) Saud Al Junaid
- 77 (Bahrain) Ali Merza
