= Manama Club (football) =

Association football club in Bahrain

- Full name: Manama Club
- Short name: Manama
- Founded: 1946; 79 years ago
- Ground: Bahrain National Stadium
- Capacity: 24,000
- Chairman: Yousif Zaman
- Manager: Adel Alnoaimi
- League: Premier League
- 2023–24: Premier League, 5th of 12
Home colours	Away colours

Manama Club (Arabic: المنامة) is a Bahraini professional football club based in Manama. Founded in 1946, the club competes in the Bahraini Premier League, the top flight of football in the country.

Manama Club, formally known as Al Taj, is a well-known basketball club in the Gulf and Asia. They have won two Gulf Championships, and were the first-ever Bahraini club and only the second Gulf club to come in third place in the 2000 ABC Champions Cup. Manama Club has won over 45 basketball titles in domestic competitions. The club is not as successful in football, however they won their first two titles, the Bahraini King's Cup and Bahraini Super Cup, in 2017. Patryk Bora, a Polish player, played for Manama Club in 2012.

== Honors ==
- Bahraini King's Cup
  - Winners (1): 2016–17
- Bahraini FA Cup
  - Winners (2): 2023, 2024
- Bahraini Super Cup
  - Winners (1): 2017

== Other sports ==
Besides football and basketball, Manama Club has teams for bowling.

== Continental record ==
Season	Competition	Round	Club	Home	Away	Aggregate
2018	AFC Cup	Group B	(Syria) Al-Jaish	0–0	1–0	4th
2018	AFC Cup	Group B	(Lebanon) Al-Ahed	0–1	3–1	4th
2018	AFC Cup	Group B	(Iraq) Al-Zawraa	1–3	2–1	4th
2020	AFC Cup	Group A	(Syria) Al-Jaish		0–0	
2020	AFC Cup	Group A	(Lebanon) Al-Ahed	1–0		
2020	AFC Cup	Group A	(Palestine) Hilal Al-Quds			
