= Busaiteen Club =

- Full name: Busaiteen Club
- Nickname: The Blue Waves
- Founded: 1945; 81 years ago
- Ground: Busaiteen Stadium
- Capacity: 10,000
- Manager: Saber Abdellaoui
- League: Second Division
- 2024–25: 2nd
Home colours	Away colours

Busaiteen (Arabic: البسيتين) is a Bahraini multi-sports club based in Busaiteen. The club competes in football, volleyball, table tennis and track and field. Its football team competes in the Bahraini Premier League, the top-flight of Bahraini football.

== Achievements ==
- Bahraini Premier League
  - Champions (1): 2013
- Bahraini FA Cup
  - Champions (1): 2003

== Notable managers ==
- (Brazil) China (2004–05)

== Volleyball team ==
The club's Volleyball team is one of the strongest teams in Bahrain. The team includes several International players. The team has won many championships in the youth and junior tournaments.
