= Al Ahli Club (Manama) =

Association football club

Al-Ahli Club
- Full name: Al-Ahli Sports Club of Manama
- Nickname: Al Nusoor (The Eagles)
- Founded: 1936; 90 years ago
- Ground: Al Ahli Stadium; Manama
- Capacity: 10,000
- Chairman: Khalid Kanoo
- Manager: Ángel López
- League: Premier League
- 2025–26: Premier League, 7th of 12
Home colours	Away colours

Al-Ahli Club of Manama (Arabic: النادي الأهلي البحريني) is a Bahraini professional football club based in Manama.

== History ==
Al Ahli (formerly known as Al Nusoor), along with Muharraq Club, is considered to be the pillar of sports in Bahrain. Another club known as Al Tursana (which reached the Bahraini King's Cup in 1969) merged with Al Nusoor to form Al-Ahli Club.

The matches between Al Ahli and Muharraq are known to draw the largest fan attendance in the Bahraini league and is considered to be the Bahrain derby. Today they still are known to have the best youth products on their side, and focus primarily on the youth players to challenge for the league title. Amongst the players that Al Ahli has produced are A'ala Hubail (the Asian Cup 2004 top scorer) and Mohammed Hubail.

== Achievements ==
- Bahraini Premier League: 5

1969, 1972, 1977, 1996, 2010.

- Bahraini Second Division League: 2

2015, 2019

- Bahraini King's Cup: 9

1960, 1968, 1977, 1982, 1987, 1991, 2001, 2003, 2024.

- Bahraini FA Cup: 2

2007, 2016.

- Bahraini Super Cup: 1

2003.

== Former players ==
- (Bahrain) Hassan Zuleikh
- (Bosnia and Herzegovina) Mehmed Alispahić
- (France) Olivier Boumelaha
- (Jordan) Mohammad Abdel-Haleem
- (Netherlands) Jeremias Carlos David
- (Tajikistan) Manouchehr Ahmadov
- (Democratic Republic of the Congo) Lelo Mbele

== Basketball team ==
The Al-Ahli Manama basketball team plays in the Bahraini Premier League. They have won championships in 2003, 2007, 2009, 2010, 2016, 2020 and 2021.
