= Graham Hawkins =

English football player and manager (1946-2016)

Personal information
- Full name: Graham Norman Hawkins
- Date of birth: 5 March 1946
- Place of birth: Darlaston, England
- Date of death: 27 September 2016 (aged 70)
- Height: 6 ft 0 in (1.83 m)
- Position: Defender

Youth career
- 1962–1964: Wolverhampton Wanderers

Senior career*
Years	Team	Apps	(Gls)
1964–1968	Wolverhampton Wanderers	34	(0)
1967	→ Los Angeles Wolves (loan)		
1968–1974	Preston North End	245	(3)
1974–1978	Blackburn Rovers	109	(4)
1978–1979	Port Vale	62	(3)
Total		450	(10)

Managerial career
- 1982–1984: Wolverhampton Wanderers
- 1984–1987: Bahrain SC
- 1987–1989: Al Hala SC
- 1990: Al-Arabi SC
- * Club domestic league appearances and goals

Graham Norman Hawkins (5 March 1946 – 27 September 2016) was an English football player and manager. During a 16-year playing career in the English Football League, he made 502 league and cup appearances, scoring eleven goals. He spent 14 years coaching and eight years in management and spent the later years of his life working as a football administrator.

A commanding defender, Hawkins began his career at Wolverhampton Wanderers in 1964 and helped the club to win promotion out of the Second Division in 1966–67. He was sold to Preston North End for a £35,000 fee in January 1968. In six and a half seasons with Preston, he made 269 league and cup appearances and also served as their captain as they won the Third Division title in 1970–71. He was sold to Blackburn Rovers for a fee of £18,000 in June 1974. He was named on the PFA Team of the Year as the club won the Third Division title in 1974–75. He made 131 league and cup appearances in three and a half seasons at the club before being sold to Port Vale in January 1978 for £6,000. He worked as a player-coach but left the club in acrimonious circumstances during the 1979–80 season after being overlooked for the caretaker manager position.

He served Shrewsbury Town as assistant manager from June 1980 until he was appointed as manager of Wolverhampton Wanderers in August 1982. In his first season of management, 1982–83, he led the club to promotion out of the Second Division despite budget constraints. Wolves were relegated out of the First Division the following season, and Hawkins was sacked in April 1984. He then spent six years coaching in the Middle East, with Bahrain SC, Al Hala SC and Al-Arabi SC. He led Bahrain SC to the Bahraini Premier League title in the 1984–85 season. He later worked as Head of Player Development at the Football League and retired in March 2011.

== Early and personal life ==
Graham Norman Hawkins was born on 5 March 1946 at 10 Castle Street, Darlaston to Ernest Norman Hawkins – a die miller at a forging works – and Ida Mary Hawkins (née Skitt). He had four siblings: Ernie (born 1935) – who drowned at the age of seven, Maureen (born 1950), Susan (born 1954) and Andrew (born 1962). He attended Addenbrooke Street Primary, Slater Street Secondary Modern Boys School and Wednesbury Technical College. He represented both Staffordshire Boys and Birmingham Boys, playing as a full-back. He married Jane on 26 June 1967, a secretary from Wolverhampton, who he had first met at the age of 16. They had two sons, Ian (born December 1969) and Richard (born December 1971). Ian became a financial adviser and played non-League football, whilst Richard attained a PhD in sports science and went on to work for various Football League and Premier League clubs.

Hawkins was diagnosed with non-Hodgkin lymphoma in August 2009. He died on 27 September 2016, at the age of 70.

== Playing career ==
=== Wolverhampton Wanderers ===
Hawkins was spotted playing for Staffordshire Boys by Wolverhampton Wanderers (Wolves) scouts and was taken on as an apprentice on wages of £8-a-week. He made his professional debut in the Black Country derby against West Bromwich Albion on 10 October 1964, which ended in a 5–1 defeat, with West Brom debutant Jeff Astle scoring two of the goals. Under the stewardship of Andy Beattie, Wolves suffered relegation out of the First Division in 1964–65, though Hawkins did not play in any further games. His second appearance came on 11 December 1965, when first-team defenders David Woodfield and John Holsgrove were both out injured, in a 4–1 victory over Ipswich Town at Molineux. His third appearance came on 26 Match 1966, when a win at Norwich City started a run of six unbeaten games, and Hawkins kept his place in the team until the end of the 1965–66 season. He picked up the nickname "Harry the Horse" after manager Ronnie Allen criticised his running technique during pre-season, comparing his face with that of a tired horse.

Wolves secured a return to the top flight after finishing second in the Second Division in the 1966–67 campaign, though Hawkins spent most of the season on the bench behind Woodfield and Holsgrove. He also had to spend three months on the sidelines after tearing his ankle ligaments in a clash with Derby County's Kevin Hector. He did start the game that secured promotion, a 4–1 win at Bury on 22 April. However, Wolves missed the chance to win the division after losing on the season's final day. In the summer he spent three weeks on tour with the club's affiliated soccer team in the United States, Los Angeles Wolves, where he shared a room with Derek Dougan. He made seven appearances in the first half of the 1967–68 season, playing his final game for the club in a 3–2 defeat to Manchester United on 30 December.

=== Preston North End ===
Hawkins joined Preston North End for a £35,000 transfer fee on 13 January 1968. After a slow start to his Deepdale career, primarily due to injury, he became a regular in the starting eleven. He was appointed captain by manager Jimmy Milne at the young age of 21. However, he would relinquish the captaincy after finding it too much of a burden. Preston finished the 1967–68 season just one place above the Second Division relegation zone, before rising to 14th-place in 1968–69 under the stewardship of Bobby Seith, with Hawkins making 42 appearances in all competitions. He was selected by Jimmy Armfield to tour Asia and New Zealand with an England "A" team in the summer of 1969, taking the place of the absent Alan Bloor, for five uncapped matches in Hong Kong, Bangkok, Kuala Lumpur, Tahiti and New Zealand.

"I was very proud to be North End captain at that special time, and that pride stays with me even today."

— Hawkins reflecting on his career in 2015.

Preston finished bottom of the division in 1969–70, though finished only three points short of safety, and Seith was dismissed. Hawkins put in a transfer request, as did many of his teammates, but the board asked him to reconsider. New manager Alan Ball reappointed Hawkins as club captain and Hawkins, this time, felt experienced enough to accept the role. He was an ever-present as the "Lilywhites" made an immediate return to the second tier, winning the Third Division championship by a one-point margin over Fulham in 1970–71. Ball valued his captain at £150,000.

Preston finished 18th in the Second Division in the 1971–72 season, with the highlight of the campaign coming in the FA Cup, where they came close to taking Manchester United to a replay. Hawkins missed the match with an injury, and Ball stated that Preston could have got a positive result if Hawkins had played. Ball was sacked in February 1973 and Preston ended the 1972–73 season above the relegation zone only on goal average. Hawkins was upset at Ball's sacking and felt that his successor, Frank Lord, confused the players with his tactics. Despite former World Cup winner Bobby Charlton being appointed as manager, Preston continued to decline and were relegated at the end of the 1973–74 season, with Nobby Stiles – another World Cup winner – taking Hawkins place as club captain. Plymouth Argyle and Blackburn Rovers made bids for Hawkins in January 1974, though he rejected the former as he did not wish to relocate to the south coast.

=== Blackburn Rovers ===
Hawkins signed with Blackburn Rovers for a transfer fee of £18,000 in June 1974. Recently appointed manager Gordon Lee was in the process of revamping the first-team, as he also signed Ken Beamish, Pat Hilton, Don Hutchins, Jimmy Mullen and Graham Oates. Hawkins formed a strong central defensive partnership with Derek Fazackerley, and played 49 games as Rovers won promotion as Third Division champions in 1974–75. For his performances that season, Hawkins was named on the Third Division's PFA Team of the Year alongside teammates Roger Jones (goalkeeper) and Andy Burgin (full-back). Hawkins credited Lee with teaching him the concept of playing the ball out from the back, permitting him to use flair and patience rather than direct football tactics.

Now managed by Jim Smith, the club finished mid-table in the Second Division in 1975–76 despite Hawkins and other players struggling with various injuries. Hawkins won the club's Player's Player of the Year award, though lost out the Fan's Player of the Year award after receiving only one vote fewer than winner Tony Parkes. Blackburn finished 12th at the end of the 1976–77 campaign and Smith began to blood new signing Glenn Keeley as a future successor to Hawkins at centre-back. Now aged 31, Hawkins became more of a reserve team player at Ewood Park in the first half of the 1977–78 season, and though he looked for a move away he rejected an approach from Shrewsbury Town as he wanted to secure a coaching role as well as a playing one.

=== Port Vale ===
Hawkins joined Bobby Smith's Port Vale in January 1978, signing as a player and youth team coach for a transfer fee of £6,000. He scored one goal in 16 Third Division appearances in the 1977–78 relegation campaign. He was appointed the first-team coach in May 1978 before being promoted to assistant manager by new boss Dennis Butler in September 1978. Hawkins scored twice in 46 games in 1978–79, missing only three Fourth Division matches all season long. When Butler stepped down as manager in August 1979, Hawkins was expecting to be appointed as caretaker manager. However, the board appointed Alan Bloor in this role. Bloor took up the position full-time the following month. Feeling slighted by this, Hawkins resigned and took out an unfair dismissal claim after the club refused to release his player registration, but dropped the claim in April 1980 when the club offered compensation. Chairman Arthur McPherson described the 1979–80 season as "probably the worst season in the club's history".

== Style of play ==
Hawkins was a defender with a commanding presence and excellent ability to read, play, and organise the backline.

== Coaching and management career ==
Upon leaving Vale Park, Hawkins coached the reserves at Blackburn Rovers and the youth team at Stoke City. He was appointed as Graham Turner's assistant at Second Division Shrewsbury Town in June 1980.

=== Wolverhampton Wanderers ===
Hawkins returned to Wolverhampton Wanderers as manager, having been appointed after the Derek Dougan-led takeover saved the club from extinction in August 1982. Hawkins accepted wages of £20,000-a-year. However, the job offer was an unexpected one as he had only applied for the vacant management post at Wrexham. He installed Jim Barron as his assistant, whilst Frank Upton was put in charge of the youth team on the understanding that young players would be important to the first-team due to the club's tight budget. He got the players to devise their own bonus structure, which rewarded them for winning matches; he told the press that "they must stay in the top bracket if they want to earn their corn". With regular goalkeeper Paul Bradshaw unavailable, Hawkins signed experienced goalkeeper John Burridge from Queens Park Rangers, who would prove to reliable on the pitch and inspirational in the dressing room, winning the club's Player of the Year award. However, budget constraints meant that he had to rely on four teenage debutants – Ian Cartwright, Paul Butler, Billy Livingstone and Dave Wintersgill – against Blackburn Rovers on the opening day of the 1982–83 season. The club's star striker, Andy Gray, openly agitated for a move away and was also injured. The team were fortunate to be only one goal down to Blackburn at half-time, but Hawkins remained calm and instructed the team to put in crosses to Butler, who went on to score a brace in the second half to give Wolves a 2–1 victory.

"That amazing season — Graham never got enough credit for it, for what he achieved with a patchwork of a team and a lot of young kids who'd never even played for the first team before."

— Express & Star reporter David Harrison.

He refused to change his matchday suit until the team were beaten, resulting in a 3–0 home defeat to Leicester City on 16 October, ending a run of 817 minutes without conceding a league goal. Gray returned to fitness to play the following game, a 5–0 defeat to First Division Sunderland in the FA Cup. Midfielder Kenny Hibbitt was persuaded to return from the United States to captain the team and went on record to say that "I have never been happier in my 14 years in the game... we were treated like serfs before... now we're treated like human beings". However, veteran centre-half Joe Gallagher left in acrimonious circumstances as Hawkins tore up his contract after Gallagher made disparaging remarks in the press and refused to appear in the team photograph. Mixed results in November were followed by four wins and a draw in December, which saw Hawkins named as Second Division Manager of the Month with the club three points clear at the top of the table. However, another heavy defeat by Leicester City allowed Queens Park Rangers to catch Wolves in February. Rangers went on to win the league by a ten-point margin as Wolves struggled for form in the latter half of the campaign. Wolves secured the second automatic promotion place with a 3–3 draw away at Charlton Athletic, despite throwing away a three-goal half-time lead.

Hawkins drew up a list of players he wanted for the 1983–84 campaign, at an estimated cost of up to £1 million, with Gary Lineker the number one target. Tony Towner was on the list, though as a winger was not considered a priority, and Hawkins was furious when Dougan signed him for £100,000 whilst both Hawkins and Barron were out of the country on holiday. Wolves secured a 1–1 draw with reigning champions Liverpool on the opening day of the season, with Geoff Palmer converting a penalty won by Gray. Yet promised investment from Bhatti brothers was not forthcoming after their company, Allied Properties, were denied planning permission by the City of Wolverhampton Council, leaving the squad poorly equipped to handle life in the top-flight. The team failed to pick up a victory and were bottom of the table by October, with bare new signings and the existing squad largely unhappy that they had not been granted pay rises for their promotion success. In fact, Gray was sold to Everton the following month for £250,000. The team finally won their first First Division game on 26 November, with new loan signing Danny Crainie scoring two goals in a 3–1 victory at local rivals West Bromwich Albion; this ended a run of 19 games without a win. This was though followed by a 5–0 loss to second-bottom Watford. Wolves remained competitive though, beating Everton and Norwich City in December to remain within two points of safety. Despite being beaten by Coventry City in a second replay in the FA Cup, January saw Wolves beat Liverpool 1–0 at Anfield. Hawkins was sacked on 27 April, four days after relegation was confirmed with a 2–0 defeat at Everton. It took seven years of legal battles for the club to pay him his compensation, by which time Wolves were in the Fourth Division.

=== Middle East ===
Hawkins emigrated to Bahrain and managed Bahrain SC in the Bahraini Premier League, winning the league title in the 1984–85 season after a crucial game with Al-Muharraq SC was replayed because of dubious refereeing and the fact that the Muharraq goalkeeper punched Hawkins in the face. Muharraq won the 1985–86 title and Hawkins services were not retained after Riffa SC were crowned champions at the end of the 1986–87 campaign. He successfully applied for the management position at Al Hala SC. He applied for the management position at Kuwait Premier League club Al-Fahaheel at the end of the 1987–88 season, but was not successful. He left Al Hala at the end of the 1988–89 campaign and returned to the UK in December 1989. He returned to Blackburn Rovers as chief scout in 1990, though left this position to take up the lucrative management post at Kuwait club Al-Arabi SC, before his time in the Middle East was ended by the Iraqi invasion of Kuwait during pre-season training.

=== Later career ===
He later did part-time scouting for Blackburn Rovers, as the chief scout post had been filled in his absence. He also took up employment at John Ritchie's wholesaler business as a door-to-door salesman. In October 1991, he took on the lease of the Coopers Arms public house in Woore. He ran the pub for seven years, at which stage he became a gardener and warehouse worker. He re-entered the football industry after being employed by Elite Sports, helping the company to earn screening contracts to prevent the sudden cardiac death of athletes. Jimmy Armfield then recruited him to work as the Football League's head of player development. There he expanded the Football League's exit trials to cover players released from Centres of Excellence rather than just Academies. He retired in March 2011, at the age of 65.

== Career statistics ==
=== Playing statistics ===
Appearances and goals by club, season and competition
Club	Season	League			FA Cup		Other^{[A]}		Total	
Club	Season	Division	Apps	Goals	Apps	Goals	Apps	Goals	Apps	Goals
Wolverhampton Wanderers	1964–65	First Division	1	0	0	0	—		1	0
Wolverhampton Wanderers	1965–66	Second Division	10	0	0	0	—		10	0
Wolverhampton Wanderers	1966–67	Second Division	16	0	0	0	1	0	17	0
Wolverhampton Wanderers	1967–68	First Division	7	0	0	0	0	0	7	0
Wolverhampton Wanderers	Total		34	0	0	0	1	0	35	0
Preston North End	1967–68	Second Division	11	0	0	0	0	0	11	0
Preston North End	1968–69	Second Division	38	0	1	0	3	0	42	0
Preston North End	1969–70	Second Division	41	3	2	1	1	0	44	4
Preston North End	1970–71	Third Division	46	0	2	0	3	0	51	0
Preston North End	1971–72	Second Division	38	0	1	0	6	0	45	0
Preston North End	1972–73	Second Division	39	0	2	0	1	0	42	0
Preston North End	1973–74	Second Division	32	0	0	0	2	0	34	0
Preston North End	Total		245	3	8	1	16	0	269	4
Blackburn Rovers	1974–75	Third Division	42	1	3	0	4	0	49	1
Blackburn Rovers	1975–76	Second Division	30	1	0	0	7	0	37	1
Blackburn Rovers	1976–77	Second Division	31	2	1	0	2	0	34	2
Blackburn Rovers	1977–78	Second Division	6	0	0	0	5	0	11	0
Blackburn Rovers	Total		109	4	4	0	18	0	131	4
Port Vale	1977–78	Third Division	16	1	0	0	0	0	16	1
Port Vale	1978–79	Fourth Division	43	2	1	0	2	0	46	2
Port Vale	1979–80	Fourth Division	3	0	0	0	2	0	5	0
Port Vale	Total		62	3	1	0	4	0	67	3
Career total			450	10	13	1	39	0	502	11

A. The "Other" column constitutes appearances and goals in the League Cup, Football League Trophy, English Football League play-offs and Full Members Cup.

=== Managerial statistics ===
Managerial record by team and tenure
Team	From	To	Record				
Team	From	To	P	W	D	L	Win %
Wolverhampton Wanderers	4 August 1982	27 April 1984	90	26	28	36	28.9
Total			90	26	28	36	28.9

== Honours ==
=== Playing ===
Individual

- PFA Third Division Team of the Year: 1974–75

Wolverhampton Wanderers

- Football League Second Division second-place promotion: 1966–67

Preston North End

- Football League Third Division: 1970–71

Blackburn Rovers

- Football League Third Division: 1974–75

=== Managerial ===
Individual

- Football League Second Division Manager of the Month: December 1982

Wolverhampton Wanderers

- Football League Second Division second-place promotion: 1982–83

Bahrain SC

- Bahraini Premier League: 1984–85
