= Rodion Gačanin =

Croatian football manager

Personal information
- Full name: Rodion Gačanin
- Date of birth: 13 January 1967 (age 59)
- Place of birth: Rijeka, Croatia

Managerial career
- Years: Team
- 1997–1999: Opatija
- 1999–2001: Orijent
- 2002–2005: Al-Riffa
- 2005–2007: Al Kuwait Kaifan
- 2007–2008: Kuwait
- 2008: Al Kuwait Kaifan
- 2008: Al-Nassr KSA
- 2009: Al-Merrikh
- 2009–2010: Al-Nasr Libya
- 2010–2011: Al-Muharraq
- 2011–2012: Al Qadsia
- 2012–2013: Erbil
- 2014: Al-Nasr Kuwait
- 2014–2015: Al-Muharraq
- 2015–2016: Al-Mesaimeer
- 2016–2017: Al-Muharraq
- 2017–2018: Al Urooba
- 2018–2019: Al-Nasr Oman
- 2019–2021: Erbil
- 2021–2022: Al-Ahly Benghazi
- 2022: Kuwait SC
- 2023: Hajer

Rodion Gačanin (born 13 January 1967) is a Croatian association football coach.

== Career ==
Gačanin started as a manager at local sides Orijent, Opatija and Crikvenica then worked in the UAE, Bahrain and Kuwait.

He has coached in the Middle East for decades and had been manager of Libyan side Al-Ahly Benghazi since September 2021, before returning to one of his former clubs, Kuwait SC, in July 2022.

On 19 June 2023, Gačanin was appointed as manager of Saudi First Division side Hajer. He was let go on 30 September 2023.

== Managerial statistics ==
As of match played 10 February 2021

Managerial record by team and tenure
Team	From	To	Record					Ref.
Team	From	To	P	W	D	L	Win %	Ref.
Riffa	1 July 2002	30 June 2005	89	64	14	11	71.9	
Kuwait	1 July 2005	5 June 2008	156	89	34	33	57.1	
Kuwait	20 December 2007	5 June 2008	13	2	5	6	15.4	
Al-Nassr	27 May 2008	4 December 2008	25	12	7	6	48.0	
Al-Merrikh	18 March 2009	26 July 2009	21	16	4	1	76.2	
Al-Nasr (Libya)	26 July 2009	30 June 2011	71	28	13	30	39.4	
Qadsia	1 July 2011	7 October 2012	62	43	11	8	69.4	
Erbil	18 December 2012	1 June 2013	23	15	4	4	65.2	
Al-Nasr (Kuwait)	7 May 2014	28 November 2014	10	2	3	5	20.0	
Al-Mesaimeer SC	1 February 2015	1 July 2016	30	2	3	25	6.7	
Al Muharraq	8 July 2016	8 January 2017	17	10	3	4	58.8	
Al Urooba	5 November 2017	1 May 2018	22	7	7	8	31.8	
Al-Nasr (Salalah)	1 July 2018	30 June 2019	33	14	10	9	42.4	
Erbil	19 October 2019	10 February 2021	44	19	11	14	43.2	
Hajer	19 June 2023	30 September 2023	7	1	1	5	14.3	
Total			622	324	130	168	52.1	—

== Honours ==
Bahrain Riffa Club

- Bahraini Premier League: 2002-03 2004-05
- Bahraini FA Cup: 2004
- Bahraini Crown Prince Cup: 2002, 2003, 2004

Al Kuwait Kaifan

- Kuwaiti Premier League: 2005-06, 2006-07, 2007-08
- Kuwait Crown Prince Cup: 2008

Al-Muharraq

- Bahraini Premier League: 2010-11, 2014-15

Al Qadsia

- Kuwaiti Premier League: 2011-12
- Kuwait Emir Cup: 2011-12
- Kuwait Super Cup: 2011
