= Senad Kreso =

Bosnian football manager (born 1955)

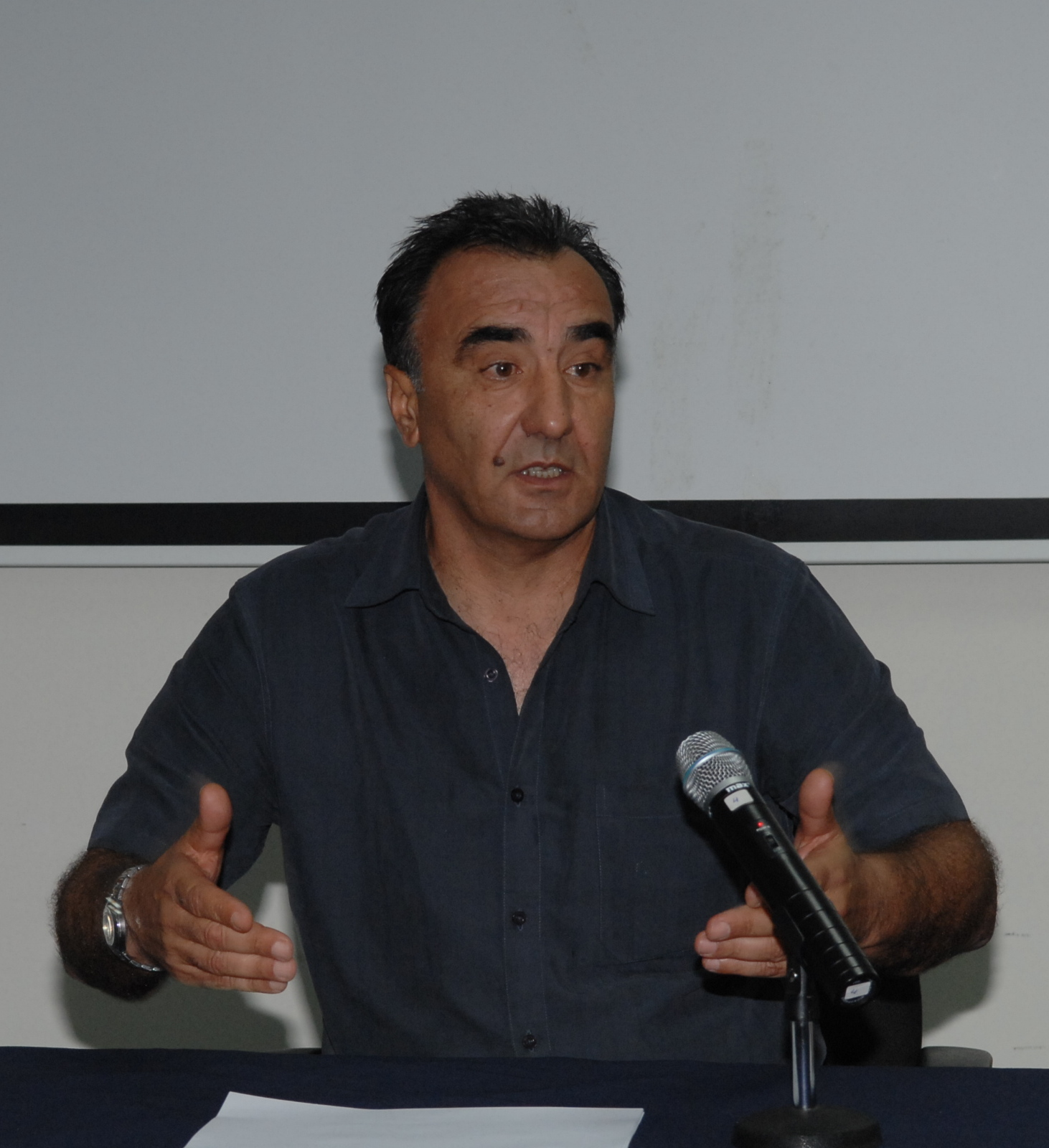
- Kreso in 2006

Personal information
- Date of birth: 5 April 1955 (age 71)
- Place of birth: Sarajevo, FPR Yugoslavia
- Height: 1.80 m (5 ft 11 in)
- Position: Midfielder

Team information
- Current team: Al-Nasr (Manager)

Youth career
- 1962–1963: Sarajevo
- 1963–1969: UNIS Vogošća

Senior career*
Years	Team	Apps	(Gls)
1969–1975	UNIS Vogošća		
1975–1978	Jedinstvo Brčko		
1979	BAK Bela Crkva		
1980–1981	Goražde		
1981–1983	UNIS Vogošća		

Managerial career
- 1984–1986: UNIS Vogošća U20
- 1986–1987: UNIS Vogošća
- 1987–1988: UNIS Vogošća U20
- 1988–1989: Mladost Župča
- 1990–1992: UNIS Vogošća
- 1992–1996: Sarajevo U20
- 1995–1996: Olimpik
- 1996–1999: Bosnia and Herzegovina U19
- 1999–2000: Al-Qadsia
- 2000–2001: Al-Merrikh
- 2001: Al-Raed
- 2001–2002: Al-Fateh
- 2002–2003: Al-Ahli
- 2003–2004: Al-Muharraq
- 2004–2006: Al-Ahli
- 2006–2007: Bahrain U-23
- 2007: Bahrain
- 2007–2009: Al-Najma
- 2009–2011: Dhofar
- 2011–2012: East Riffa
- 2013: Majees
- 2014: Busaiteen
- 2014: Al-Orouba
- 2015–2016: Salalah
- 2016: Al-Nasr
- * Club domestic league appearances and goals

Senad Kreso (born 5 April 1955) is a Bosnian professional football manager and former player.

== Playing career ==
Senad began his footballing career in 1962 with the youth squad of top Bosnian club, FK Sarajevo. In 1963, he moved to Vogošća where he signed a long-term contract with FK UNIS Vogošća and played for the youth teams of the club for a long period of six years.

He began his professional footballing career in 1969 with his parent club, FK UNIS Vogošća and played there for a long period of six years. In 1975, he signed a long-term contract with Brčko-based, FK Jedinstvo Brčko.

In 1979, he first moved out of Bosnia and Herzegovina as a footballer to Serbia where he played for a short period with Bela Crkva-based, FK BAK Bela Crkva.

In 1980, he moved back to Bosnia and Herzegovina where he signed a one-year contract with Goražde-based, FK Goražde. In 1981, he moved back to Vogošća and more accurately to his parent and former club, FK UNIS Vogošća before hanging his boots as a professional footballer in 1983.

== Managerial career ==
Senad holds the UEFA A Licence, the second highest football coaching qualification. He has participated in various Youth Level courses organised by the Royal Belgian Football Association in Brussels. He has also participated in various lower level UEFA Coaching courses organised by Malta Football Association, Italian Football Federation and Football Association of Norway in association with UEFA.

=== Bosnia and Herzegovina ===
He has had a successful managerial career from 1984 to 1999 in Bosnia and Herzegovina with teams like FK UNIS Vogošća, FK Mladost Župča, FK Sarajevo U20, FK Olimpik and Bosnia and Herzegovina national under-20 football team.

=== Al-Qadsia ===
He first moved out of Bosnia and Herzegovina in 1999 to Kuwait where he was appointed as the manager of Kuwaiti Premier League club, Al-Qadsia SC.

=== Al-Merrikh ===
In the year 2000, he moved to North Africa where he was appointed as the manager of Sudan's most successful club, Al-Merrikh SC. In his one-year stay at the Omdurman-based club, he helped them win the 2000–2001 Sudan Premier League and the 2001 Sudan Cup.

=== Saudi Arabia ===
He then moved to Saudi Arabia in 2001 where he was appointed as the manager of Buraidah-based, Saudi Premier League club, Al-Raed and later in the mid-season he was appointed as the manager of another Saudi Arabian club, Al-Fateh SC.

=== Al-Ahli ===
His next move was to Bahrain in 2003 where he was appointed as the manager of Bahraini Premier League club, Al-Ahli. In his one-year stay at the Manama-based club, he helped them win the 2003 Bahraini King's Cup. He also helped them secure the 3rd position in the 2002–03 Bahraini Premier League.

=== Al-Muharraq ===
At the end of the 2002–03 season, he was appointed as the manager of another Bahraini club, Al-Muharraq SC. In his one-year stay at the Muharraq-based club, he helped them win the 2003–04 Bahraini Premier League.

=== Back to Al-Ahli ===
In 2004, he moved back to Manama and was reappointed as the manager of his former club, Al-Ahli Club. This particular time he helped the club achieve the runners-up position in all the three major titles of the Bahrain Football Association. Under the Bosnian manager, the club secured the 2nd position in the 2005–06 Bahraini Premier League, achieved the runners-up place in the 2006 Bahraini King's Cup and also achieved the runners-up place in the 2005 Bahraini Crown Prince Cup.

=== Bahrain U-23 and Bahrain national team ===
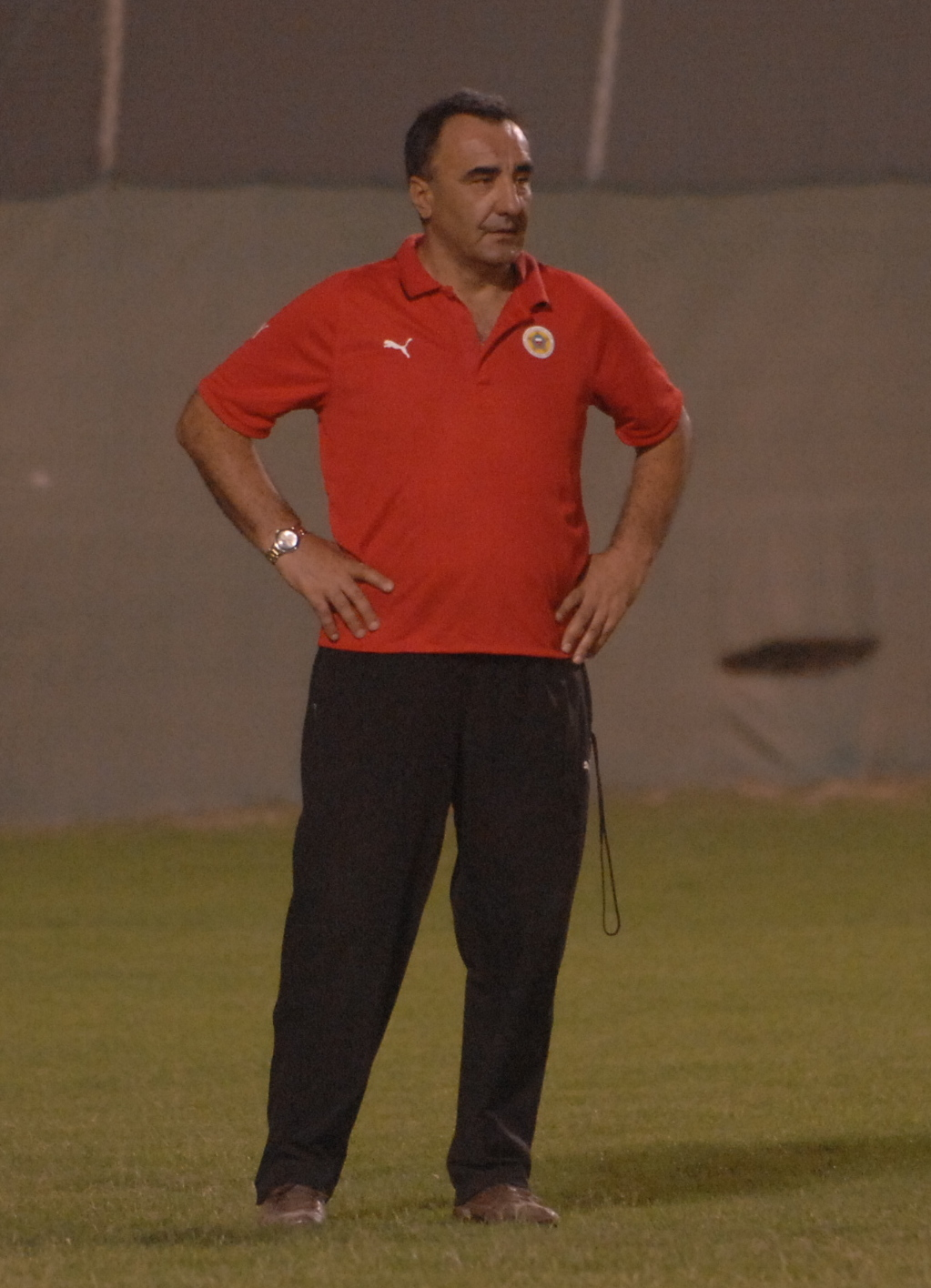
Senad Kreso - Bahrain national football team

After a two-years successful stint with top Bahraini clubs, Al-Ahli Club and Al-Muharraq SC, the Bahrain Football Association appointed him as the manager of the Bahrain national under-23 football team. Looking at his success with the top clubs of Bahrain, the association appointed him as the manager of Bahrain national football team in 2007. His first major task was to lead the national team in the region's biggest football tournament, the 18th Arabian Gulf Cup. He led his side to the Semi-Finals stage of the competition but his side faced a 1–0 loss against Oman in the Semi-finals.

=== Al-Najma ===
At the end of the 2006–07 Bahraini Premier League season, he was appointed as the manager of another Manama-based club, Al-Najma. He helped the club achieve the runners-up place in the 2008 Bahraini King's Cup.

=== Dhofar ===
In 2009, he again made a move out of Bosnia and Herzegovina and this time to Oman where on 26 December 2009 he was appointed as the manager of Salalah-based Omani giants, Dhofar. In his first year with then the 9-time Oman League winners, he helped them secure the 2nd position in the 2009–10 Oman Mobile League and also helped them achieve the runners-up position in the 2009 Sultan Qaboos Cup where they narrowly lost 7–6 on penalties to Saham SC. The club management was happy with the efforts and achievements of the Bosnian manager in his first ever season in the country and as a result on 29 May 2009, he signed a contract extension with the Salalah-based club. In the 2010–11 Oman League season, he helped the club win the biggest and the most prestigious trophy of the country, the 2011 Sultan Qaboos Cup. But after some disputes with the club management and due to some financial delays in December 2011, he decided to part company with the club.

=== East Riffa ===
In January 2012, he again moved out of Bosnia and Herzegovina and more accurately to his former working place, Bahrain. On 29 January 2012, he signed a one-year contract to be appointed as the manager of East Riffa Club.

=== Majees ===
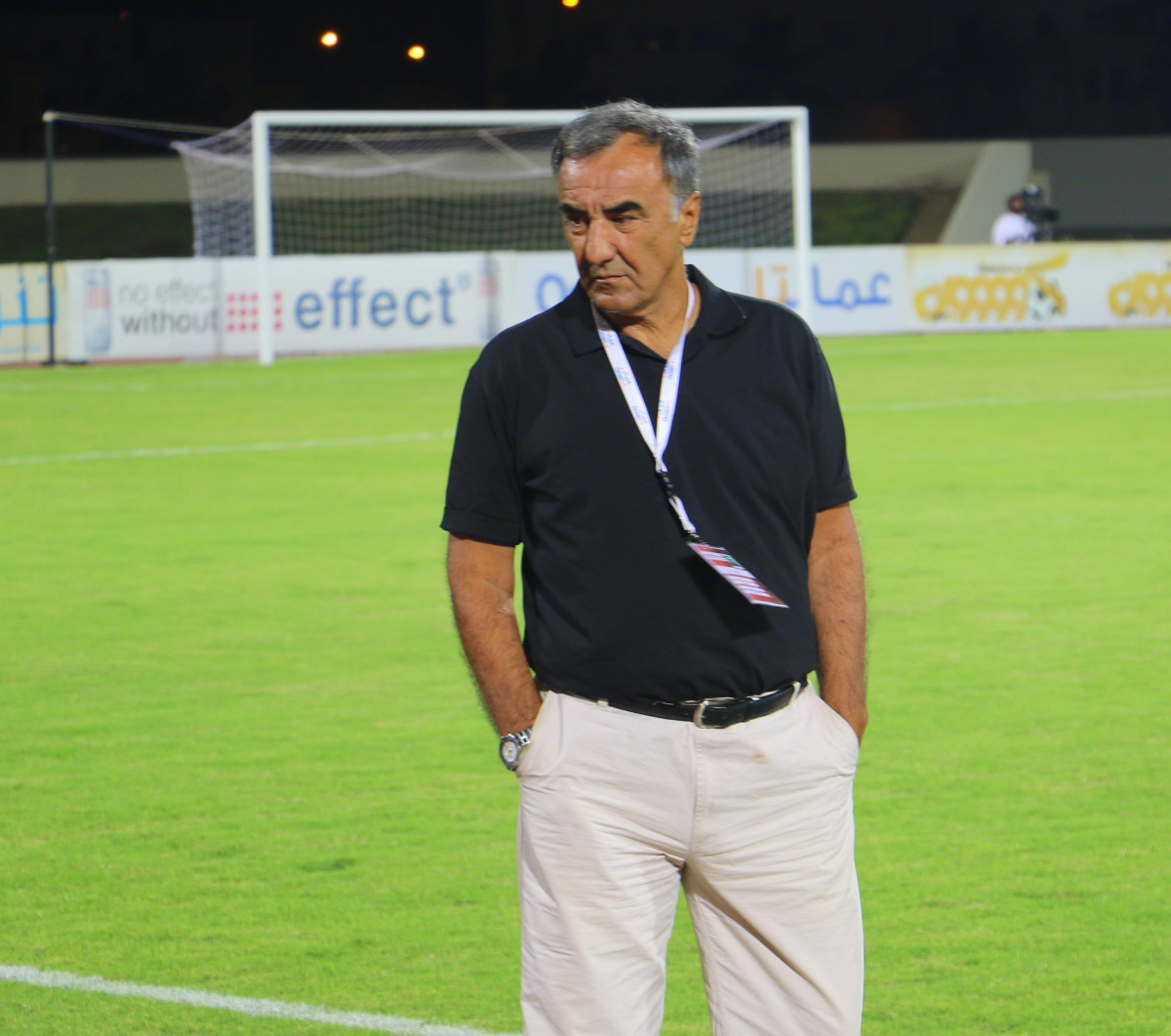
Senad Kreso - 2015–16 Oman Professional League

Before the beginning of the inaugural season of the Oman Professional League (2013–14 season), on 13 August 2013 he was appointed as the manager of the newly promoted Sohar-based club, Majees SC. But after some disputes with the club management and due to some financial delays he decided to part company with the Majees-based club.

=== Busaiteen ===
In December 2013, he moved back to Bahrain where on 18 December 2013, he again signed a short-term contract with Bahraini Premier League club, Busaiteen. In his very short-stint with the Busaiteen-based club, he helped them achieve the runners-up position in the 2014 Bahraini King's Cup where his side faced a narrow 2–1 loss against his former club, East Riffa.

=== Al-Orouba ===
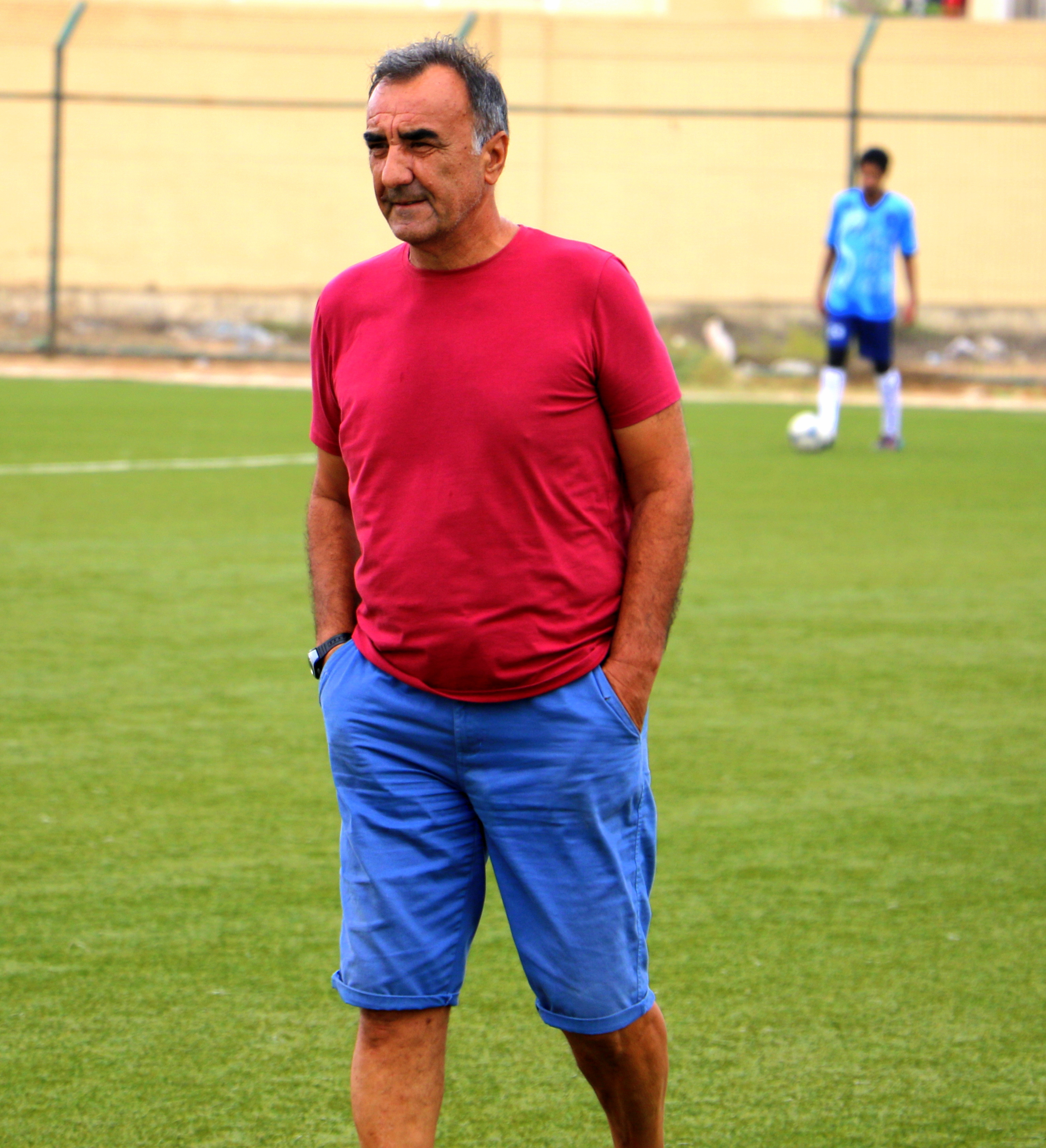
Senad Kreso - Salalah SC

In July 2014, he moved back to Oman and more accurately to Sur where he was appointed as the head coach of the eventual winners of the 2014–15 Oman Professional League and the 2014–15 Sultan Qaboos Cup, Al-Orouba. But after some disputes with the club management, he was sacked by the Sur-based club on 5 September 2014, a few days before the beginning of the 2014–15 Oman Professional League.

=== Salalah ===
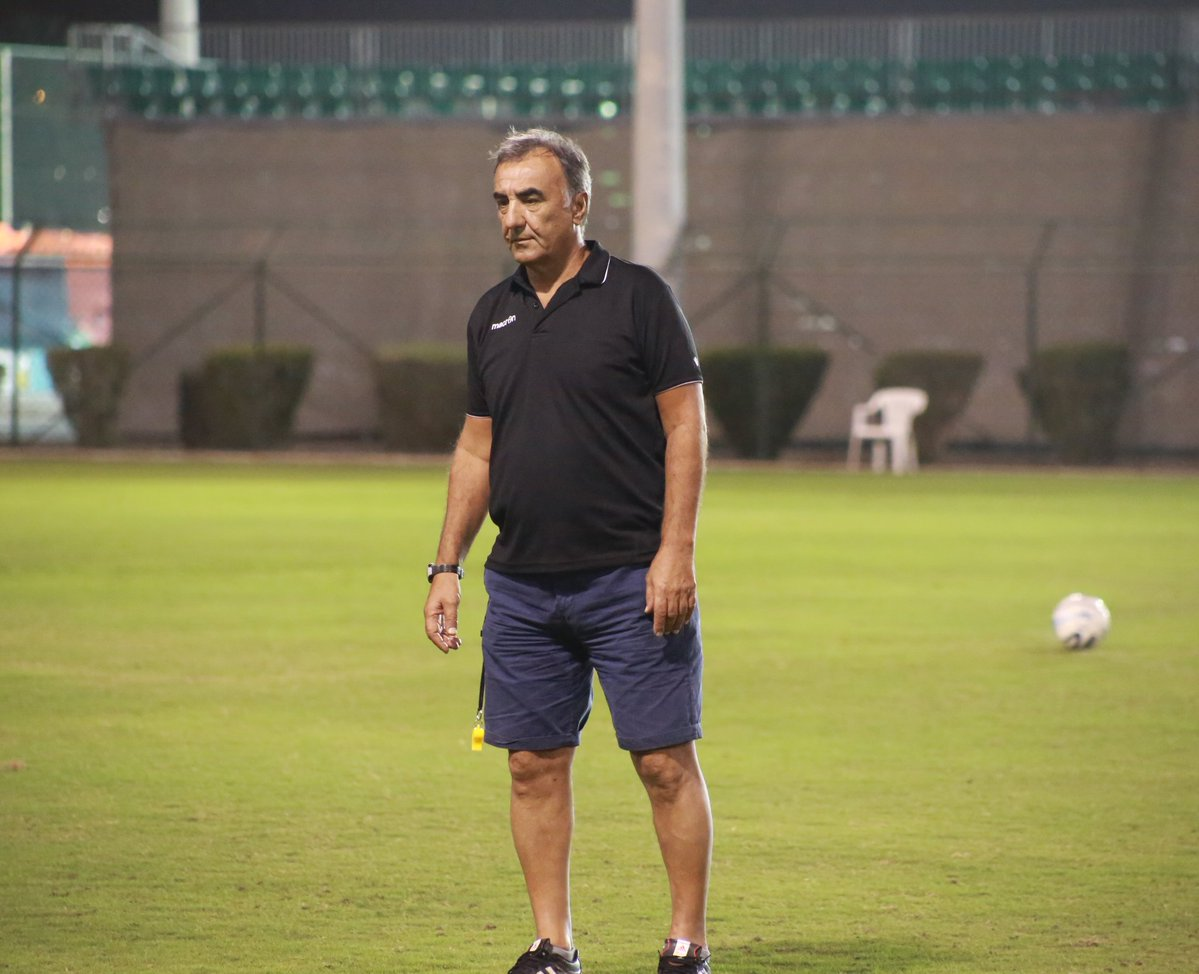
Senad Kreso - Al-Nasr

On 12 July 2015, he was appointed as the manager of another Oman Professional Club, Salalah SC.

During the pre-season, he helped his side achieve the runners-up position in the 2015 Salalah Festival Football Cup when his side narrowly lost 4–2 on penalties to local rivals Al-Nasr S.C.C. after the match had ended 3–3 after extra time. His club began the 2015–16 Oman Professional League campaign on a disappointing note as they faced a 3–1 loss at home against defending champions and his former club, Al-Oruba SC at the Al-Saada Stadium. He helped his club qualify for the Quarter-finals of the 2015–16 Sultan Qaboos Cup following a massive 7–2 win over Oman Second Division League's Al-Salam SC in the Round of 32 and a 2–1 win over Oman First Division League's Al-Wahda SC in the Round of 16.

On 22 January 2016, after a lackluster performance of the club in the 2015–16 Oman Professional League under the Bosnian, Salalah SC's management decided to part ways with Bosnian manager.

=== Al-Nasr ===
A couple of weeks later, Kreso was appointed as manager of local rivals of his former clubs Salalah and Dhofar, Al-Nasr until the end of the 2015–16 season. He helped his side win the 2015–16 Oman Professional League Cup.

== Personal life ==
Kreso is married and lives with his family in his hometown, Sarajevo.

== Honours ==
=== Manager ===
Al-Ahli

- Bahraini King's Cup: 2003

Al-Muharraq

- Bahraini Premier League: 2003–04

Dhofar

- Sultan Qaboos Cup: 2011

Al-Nasr

- Oman Professional League Cup: 2015–16
