= Ismail Abdullatif =

Bahraini footballer

Personal information
- Full name: Ismail Abdullatif Ismail Hassan
- Date of birth: 11 September 1986 (age 40)
- Place of birth: Al-Muharraq, Bahrain
- Height: 1.82 m (6 ft 0 in)
- Position: Forward

Youth career
- 1999–2004: Al-Hala

Senior career*
Years	Team	Apps	(Gls)
2004–2010	Al-Hala	53	(41)
2007–2009	Al-Arabi	24	(7)
2009–2011	Riffa	12	(8)
2011	Al-Nasr	8	(3)
2011–2012	Al-Muharraq	12	(6)
2012–2013	Al Ahli	10	(5)
2013	Al-Nahda	11	(3)
2014	Al-Salmiya	18	(6)
2014–2021	Al-Muharraq	89	(64)
2021–2026	Al-Khalidiya	51	(22)

International career
2004–2007	Bahrain U21	19	(9)
2005–2025	Bahrain	138	(48)
Medal record
Men's football
Representing Bahrain
Gulf Cup
Winner	2024 Kuwait
- * Club domestic league appearances and goals

Ismail Abdullatif Ismail Hassan (Arabic: إِسْمَاعِيل عَبْد اللَّطِيف إِسْمَاعِيل حَسَن; born 11 September 1986) is a Bahraini former professional footballer who plays as a forward. He is Bahrain's all-time top scorer.

Representing Bahrain at three AFC Asian Cups and the 2021 FIFA Arab Cup, two of his 48 international goals made history for the country: one in a 2–1 upset of South Korea at the 2007 AFC Asian Cup and the other against Saudi Arabia in 2009 that sent Bahrain to play New Zealand in the inter-confederation play-offs, which they eventually lost.

== Career statistics ==
=== Club ===
As of 19 May 2024

Appearances and goals by club, season and competition
Club	Season	League			Cup		Continental		Others		Total	
Club	Season	Division	Apps	Goals	Apps	Goals	Apps	Goals	Apps	Goals	Apps	Goals
Al-Hala	2004–05	Bahraini Premier League	8	1			-				8	1
Al-Hala	2005–06	Bahraini Second Division	14	16			-				14	16
Al-Hala	2006–07	Bahraini Premier League	21	22			-				21	22
Al-Hala	2010–11	Bahraini Premier League	10	2			-				10	2
Al-Hala	Total		53	41			-				53	41
Al-Arabi	2007–08	Kuwaiti Premier League	16	6			-				16	6
Al-Arabi	2008–09	Kuwaiti Premier League	8	1			-				8	1
Al-Arabi	Total		24	7			-				24	7
Al-Riffa	2009–10	Bahraini Premier League	12	8			4	4			16	12
Al-Nasr	2011–12	Oman First Division	8	3			-				8	3
Al-Muharraq	2011–12	Bahraini Premier League	12	6			-		5	3	17	9
Al-Muharraq	2014–15	Bahraini Premier League	18	16			-				18	16
Al-Muharraq	2015–16	Bahraini Premier League	18	17	4	4	6	3			28	24
Al-Muharraq	2016–17	Bahraini Premier League	10	6			7	1			17	7
Al-Muharraq	2017–18	Bahraini Premier League	14	11			-				14	11
Al-Muharraq	2018–19	Bahraini Premier League	12	5			-		1	1	13	6
Al-Muharraq	2019–20	Bahraini Premier League	7	3	1	1	1	1	1	1	10	6
Al-Muharraq	2020–21	Bahraini Premier League	10	6			3	2	2	3	15	11
Al-Muharraq	Total		101	70	5	5	17	7	9	8	132	90
Al-Ahli	2012–13	Qatari Second Division	10	5			-				10	5
Al-Salmiya	2013–14	Kuwaiti Premier League	18	6			-				18	6
Al-Nahda	2013–14	Saudi Pro League	11	3			-				11	3
Al-Khaldiya	2021–22	Bahraini Premier League	16	9	1	1	-		3	2	20	12
Al-Khaldiya	2022–23	Bahraini Premier League	15	7	4	4	-		2	1	21	12
Al-Khaldiya	2023–24	Bahraini Premier League	9	5	2	3	1	1	3	2	15	11
Al-Khaldiya	Total		40	21	7	8	1	1	8	5	56	35
Career total			277	164	12	13	22	12	17	13	317	202

=== International ===
As of match played 25 March 2025

Appearances and goals by national team and year
National team	Years	Apps	Goals
Bahrain	2005	1	0
Bahrain	2006	6	0
Bahrain	2007	7	1
Bahrain	2008	12	1
Bahrain	2009	16	8
Bahrain	2010	19	9
Bahrain	2011	17	8
Bahrain	2012	5	3
Bahrain	2013	10	2
Bahrain	2014	8	3
Bahrain	2015	6	1
Bahrain	2016	3	2
Bahrain	2017	7	1
Bahrain	2018	0	0
Bahrain	2019	8	2
Bahrain	2020	0	0
Bahrain	2021	7	5
Bahrain	2022	0	0
Bahrain	2023	0	0
Bahrain	2024	4	1
Bahrain	2025	2	0
Total		138	48

Scores and results list Bahrain's goal tally first.

List of international goals scored by Ismail Abdullatif
No.	Date	Venue	Opponent	Score	Result	Competition
1.	15 July 2007	Gelora Bung Karno Stadium, Jakarta, Indonesia	South Korea	2–1	2–1	2007 AFC Asian Cup
2.	2 June 2008	Rajamangala Stadium, Bangkok, Thailand	Thailand	2–1	3–2	2010 FIFA World Cup qualification
3.	21 January 2009	Hong Kong Stadium, Hong Kong	Hong Kong	1–0	3–1	2011 AFC Asian Cup qualification
4.	3 June 2009	Bahrain National Stadium, Riffa, Bahrain	Jordan	3–0	4–0	Friendly
5.	3 June 2009	Bahrain National Stadium, Riffa, Bahrain	Jordan	4–0	4–0	Friendly
6.	31 August 2009	Bahrain National Stadium, Riffa, Bahrain	Iran	2–0	4–2	Bahrain 3 Nations Tournament
7.	9 September 2009	King Fahd International Stadium, Riyadh, Saudi Arabia	Saudi Arabia	2–2	2–2	2010 FIFA World Cup qualification
8.	6 November 2009	Bahrain National Stadium, Riffa, Bahrain	Togo	2–0	5–1	Friendly
9.	6 November 2009	Bahrain National Stadium, Riffa, Bahrain	Togo	3–0	5–1	Friendly
10.	18 November 2009	Bahrain National Stadium, Riffa, Bahrain	Yemen	1–0	4–0	2011 AFC Asian Cup qualification
11.	6 January 2010	Bahrain National Stadium, Riffa, Bahrain	Hong Kong	1–0	4–0	2011 AFC Asian Cup qualification
12.	6 January 2010	Bahrain National Stadium, Riffa, Bahrain	Hong Kong	2–0	4–0	2011 AFC Asian Cup qualification
13.	6 January 2010	Bahrain National Stadium, Riffa, Bahrain	Hong Kong	3–0	4–0	2011 AFC Asian Cup qualification
14.	11 August 2010	Nanjing Olympic Sports Center, Nanjing, China	China	1–1	1–1	Friendly
15.	26 September 2010	King Abdullah Stadium, Amman, Jordan	Oman	1–0	2–0	2010 WAFF Championship
16.	26 September 2010	King Abdullah Stadium, Amman, Jordan	Oman	2–0	2–0	2010 WAFF Championship
17.	8 October 2010	Jaber Al-Ahmad International Stadium, Kuwait City, Kuwait	Kuwait	1–0	3–1	Friendly
18.	26 November 2010	May 22 Stadium, Aden, Yemen	Iraq	2–3	2–3	20th Arabian Gulf Cup
19.	28 December 2010	Al-Rashid Stadium, Dubai, United Arab Emirates	Jordan	2–1	2–1	Friendly
20.	14 January 2011	Jassim bin Hamad Stadium, Doha, Qatar	India	2–1	5–2	2011 AFC Asian Cup
21.	14 January 2011	Jassim bin Hamad Stadium, Doha, Qatar	India	3–1	5–2	2011 AFC Asian Cup
22.	14 January 2011	Jassim bin Hamad Stadium, Doha, Qatar	India	4–1	5–2	2011 AFC Asian Cup
23.	14 January 2011	Jassim bin Hamad Stadium, Doha, Qatar	India	5–2	5–2	2011 AFC Asian Cup
24.	26 August 2011	Bahrain National Stadium, Riffa, Bahrain	Sudan	1–0	1–0	Friendly
25.	6 September 2011	Gelora Bung Karno Stadium, Jakarta, Indonesia	Indonesia	2–0	2–0	2014 FIFA World Cup qualification
26.	13 December 2011	Jassim bin Hamad Stadium, Doha, Qatar	Iraq	2–0	3–0	2011 Pan Arab Games
27.	13 December 2011	Jassim bin Hamad Stadium, Doha, Qatar	Iraq	3–0	3–0	2011 Pan Arab Games
28.	23 December 2011	Jassim bin Hamad Stadium, Doha, Qatar	Jordan	1–0	2–6	2011 Pan Arab Games
29.	29 February 2012	Bahrain National Stadium, Riffa, Bahrain	Indonesia	1–0	10–0	2014 FIFA World Cup qualification
30.	29 February 2012	Bahrain National Stadium, Riffa, Bahrain	Indonesia	10–0	10–0	2014 FIFA World Cup qualification
31.	16 October 2012	Zabeel Stadium, Dubai, United Arab Emirates	United Arab Emirates	1–0	2–6	Friendly
32.	9 November 2013	Bahrain National Stadium, Riffa, Bahrain	Lebanon	1–0	1–0	Friendly
33.	15 November 2013	Bahrain National Stadium, Riffa, Bahrain	Malaysia	1–0	1–0	2015 AFC Asian Cup qualification
34.	7 November 2014	Bahrain National Stadium, Riffa, Bahrain	Singapore	1–0	2–0	Friendly
35.	30 December 2014	Melbourne Cricket Ground, Melbourne, Australia	Saudi Arabia	3–1	4–1	Friendly
36.	30 December 2014	Melbourne Cricket Ground, Melbourne, Australia	Saudi Arabia	4–1	4–1	Friendly
37.	13 October 2015	Bahrain National Stadium, Riffa, Bahrain	Philippines	1–0	2–0	2018 FIFA World Cup qualification
38.	29 March 2016	Bahrain National Stadium, Riffa, Bahrain	Yemen	1–0	3–0	2018 FIFA World Cup qualification
39.	1 September 2016	Bahrain National Stadium, Riffa, Bahrain	Singapore	3–1	3–1	Friendly
40.	10 October 2017	Taipei Municipal Stadium, Taipei, Taiwan	Chinese Taipei	1–0	1–2	2019 AFC Asian Cup qualification
41.	4 August 2019	Franso Hariri Stadium, Erbil, Iraq	Jordan	1–0	1–0	2019 WAFF Championship
42.	10 August 2019	Franso Hariri Stadium, Erbil, Iraq	Kuwait	1–0	1–0	2019 WAFF Championship
43.	25 March 2021	Bahrain National Stadium, Riffa, Bahrain	Syria	1–0	3–1	Friendly
44.	25 March 2021	Bahrain National Stadium, Riffa, Bahrain	Syria	2–1	3–1	Friendly
45.	3 June 2021	Bahrain National Stadium, Riffa, Bahrain	Cambodia	7–0	8–0	2022 FIFA World Cup qualification
46.	3 June 2021	Bahrain National Stadium, Riffa, Bahrain	Cambodia	8–0	8–0	2022 FIFA World Cup qualification
47.	15 June 2021	Bahrain National Stadium, Riffa, Bahrain	Hong Kong	4–0	4–0	2022 FIFA World Cup qualification
48.	21 March 2024	Bahrain National Stadium, Riffa, Bahrain	Nepal	5–0	5–0	2026 FIFA World Cup qualification

== Honours ==
Muharraq

- Champion Bahrain League: 2014–15, 2017–18

Al-Khaldiya

- Champion Bahrain League: 2022–23

Bahrain

- Arabian Gulf Cup: 2019, 2024–25

Individual

- Topscorer Bahrain League: Golden shoe 2014–15

== See also ==
- List of men's footballers with 100 or more international caps
- List of top international men's football goal scorers by country
