= 2018–19 Bahraini Premier League =

Bahrain Premier League
- Season: 2018–19
- Champions: Al-Riffa
- Relegated: Malkiya
- AFC Champions League: Al-Riffa
- AFC Cup: Manama; Al-Muharraq

The 2018–19 Bahraini Premier League (also known as Nasser Bin Hamad Premier League) was the 62nd top-level football season in Bahrain. The season started on 16 September 2018.

== League table ==
| Pos | Team | Pld | W | D | L | GF | GA | GD | Pts | Qualification or relegation |
|---|---|---|---|---|---|---|---|---|---|---|
| 1 | Al-Riffa (C) | 18 | 12 | 4 | 2 | 39 | 15 | +24 | 40 | Qualification for AFC Champions League preliminary round 1 (Note: If the league champions cannot qualify for the AFC Champions League group stage, they will enter the AFC Cup group stage.) |
| 2 | Manama | 18 | 10 | 4 | 4 | 35 | 24 | +11 | 34 | Qualification for AFC Cup group stage (Note: Since league champions Al-Riffa were also Bahraini King's Cup winners, the league runners-up qualified for the AFC Cup group stage.) |
| 3 | Al-Muharraq | 18 | 9 | 4 | 5 | 35 | 22 | +13 | 31 | |
| 4 | Al-Hidd | 18 | 8 | 4 | 6 | 29 | 23 | +6 | 28 | |
| 5 | Al-Najma SC | 18 | 8 | 4 | 6 | 27 | 23 | +4 | 28 | |
| 6 | East Riffa | 18 | 7 | 4 | 7 | 21 | 18 | +3 | 25 | |
| 7 | Al-Shabab | 18 | 5 | 4 | 9 | 22 | 32 | −10 | 19 | |
| 8 | Al-Hala (O) | 18 | 5 | 4 | 9 | 18 | 29 | −11 | 19 | Qualification for Relegation play-offs |
| 9 | Budaiya (R) | 18 | 4 | 3 | 11 | 18 | 39 | −21 | 15 | Relegation to Bahraini Second Division |
| 10 | Malkiya (R) | 18 | 4 | 1 | 13 | 15 | 34 | −19 | 13 | Relegation to Bahraini Second Division |

Source: Goalzz
(C) Champions; (O) Play-off winners; (R) Relegated

=== Foreign players ===
The number of foreign players is limited to 6 per team, and should not be a goalkeeper.

- Players name in **bold** indicates the player is registered during the mid-season transfer window.

| Club | Player 1 | Player 2 | Player 3 | Player 4 | Player 5 | Player 6 | Former players |
|---|---|---|---|---|---|---|---|
| Al Riffa | (Nigeria) Uche Agba | (Nigeria) Emmanuel | **(Nigeria) Ifedayo Olusegun** | (Nigeria) Habib Haroon | (Syria) Jehad Al Baour | (Jordan) Issam Salem | |
| Manama Club | **(Brazil) Thiago Fernandes** | (Brazil) Ronaldo Kalu | **(Brazil) Júlio Vaz** | | | | (Brazil) Erick Luis |
| Al Muharraq | (Tunisia) Zied Derbali | **(Tunisia) Tijani Belaïd** | (Libya) Mohammed Sola | **(Brazil) Everton** | (Sudan) Jaser Hamed | | |
| Al Hidd | **(Syria) Mohammed Fares** | (Tunisia) Slim Mezlini | (Nigeria) Atede Moses | (Yemen) Muath Al Reemi | (Ethiopia) Nader Abdulmonem | **(Brazil) Matheus** | (Jordan) Mohammed Al Dawood (Saudi Arabia) Issam Hossam |
| Al Najma SC | (Senegal) Mouhamadou Dramé | (Brazil) Esdras | (Nigeria) Ifeanyi Ekwunife | **(Nigeria) Vincento Ani** | | | (Syria) Moaiad Khole |
| East Riffa Club | (Spain) Imanol Sarriegi | **(France) Goran Jerković** | (Jordan) Laith Hashim | (Jordan) Mohamed Hashim | | | (Spain) Álex Aizpuru |
| Al Shabab | (Senegal) Papa Sall | (Nigeria) Aziz Oluwashina | **(Nigeria) Prince Aggreh** | | | | |
| Al Hala | (Brazil) João Luiz | (Brazil) Samuel Araújo | (Mali) Yahia Infahi | | | | |
| Budaiya Club | (Brazil) Aílton Júnior | | | | | | |
| Al Malkiya | (Ghana) Joseph Adjei | | | | | | |

=== Personnel ===
| Team | Manager | Chairman |
|---|---|---|
| Al Riffa | (Bahrain) Ali Ashoor | (Bahrain) sheikh Abdulla bin Khalid Al Khalifa |
| Manama Club | (Bahrain) Mohamed Bashir Al Shamlan | (Bahrain) Zuhair Kazerooni |
| Al Muharraq | (Bahrain) Salman Ahmed Sharida | (Bahrain) sheikh Ahmed bin Ali Al Khalifa |
| Al Hidd | (Bahrain) Mohamed Ali Al Moqla | (Bahrain) Ahmed bin Salman Al Muslem |
| Al Najma SC | (Tunisia) Fathi Laabidi | (Bahrain) Isa Hassan Al Qattan |
| East Riffa Club | (Spain) Pedro Gómez Carmona | (Bahrain) sheikh Nasser bin Khalid Al Khalifa |
| Al Shabab | (Syria) Haitham Jattal | (Bahrain) Ahmed Mirza |
| Al Hala | (Bahrain) Aref Buah Al Asmi | (Bahrain) Jassim Ibrahim Rashdan |
| Budaiya Club | | (Bahrain) Ali Husain Al Doseri |
| Al Malkiya | (Bahrain) Ahmed Saleh Al Dakheel | (Bahrain) Jassim Abdulaal |

== Relegation play-offs ==
First Leg [May 2]: Al-Hala 3–1 Sitra

Second Leg [May 7]: Sitra 1–1 Al-Hala
