= Bahraini football club records and statistics =

Among Bahraini football clubs the one that has won by far the greatest number of trophies is Al-Muharraq Sports Club, which has won both the Bahraini Premier League and the King's Cup on 30 or more occasions.

== Successful teams ==
Team	Total Number of Trophies	Premier League Winners	King's Cup Winners	FA Cup Winners	Crown Prince Cup Winners	Super Cup Winners
Muharraq Club	79	34	33	4	5	3
Bahrain Riffa Club	29	13	7	4	4	1
Al Ahli	15	5	8	2		
Bahrain Club	7	5	2			
Al Hala	4	1	3			
Al-Najma	5		3			2
East Riffa Club	6	1	3	1		1
Al Wahda	3		3			
Al Arabi	2	1	1			
Al Nasr	1	1				
Busaiteen Club	2	1		1		
