= 1999–2000 Bahraini Premier League =

Bahraini Premier League
- Season: 1999–2000

Statistics of Bahraini Premier League for the 1999–2000 season.

== Overview ==
It was contested by 12 teams, and Bahrain Riffa Club won the championship.

== Regular season ==
=== Group 1 ===
Pos	Team	Pld	W	D	L	GF	GA	GD	Pts
1	Muharraq Club	10	6	4	0	21	10	+11	22
2	Bahrain Riffa Club	10	6	3	1	27	13	+14	21
3	Al Hala	10	4	2	4	15	16	−1	14
4	Essa Town	10	3	2	5	15	19	−4	11
5	Malkiya Club	10	3	1	6	17	23	−6	10
6	Budaia	10	1	2	7	8	22	−14	5

Source: rsssf.com

=== Group 2 ===
Pos	Team	Pld	W	D	L	GF	GA	GD	Pts
1	Al-Ahli	10	6	2	2	16	9	+7	20
2	Busaiteen Club	10	4	5	1	17	9	+8	17
3	Bahrain	10	3	5	2	11	11	0	14
4	East Riffa Club	10	4	1	5	15	14	+1	13
5	Qalali	10	2	4	4	17	24	−7	10
6	Al Hilal	10	1	3	6	11	20	−9	6

Source: rsssf.com

== Championship playoff ==
=== Group A ===
Pos	Team	Pld	W	D	L	GF	GA	GD	Pts
1	Muharraq Club	6	4	2	0	15	8	+7	14
2	East Riffa Club	6	3	1	2	11	8	+3	10
3	Al Hala	6	2	2	2	13	9	+4	8
4	Busaiteen Club	6	0	1	5	6	20	−14	1

Source: rsssf.com

=== Group B ===
Pos	Team	Pld	W	D	L	GF	GA	GD	Pts
1	Al-Ahli	6	4	1	1	8	4	+4	13
2	Bahrain Riffa Club	6	3	0	3	11	9	+2	9
3	Bahrain	6	2	1	3	10	10	0	7
4	Essa Town	6	1	2	3	7	13	−6	5

Source: rsssf.com

== Championship playoff ==
=== Semifinals ===
- Muharraq Club 0-3 : 1-0 Bahrain Riffa Club
- Al-Ahli 2-3 : 0-1 East Riffa Club

=== Third-place match ===
- Muharraq Club 2-3 Al-Ahli

=== Final ===
- Bahrain Riffa Club 4-0 East Riffa Club

== Relegation playoff ==
Pos	Team	Pld	W	D	L	GF	GA	GD	Pts
9	Al Hilal	6	3	1	2	13	6	+7	10
10	Qalali	6	3	1	2	7	7	0	10
11	Malkiya Club	6	2	1	3	10	13	−3	7
12	Budaia	6	2	1	3	6	10	−4	7

Source: rsssf.com
