= 1997–98 Bahraini Premier League =

Bahraini Premier League
- Season: 1997–98

Statistics of Bahraini Premier League for the 1997–98 season.

== Overview ==
It was contested by 10 teams, and Bahrain Riffa Club won the championship.

== League standings ==
Pos	Team	Pld	W	D	L	GF	GA	GD	Pts
1	Bahrain Riffa Club	18	14	3	1	39	14	+25	45
2	Muharraq Club	18	11	5	2	33	15	+18	38
3	East Riffa Club	18	11	3	4	42	19	+23	36
4	Al-Ahli	18	6	7	5	30	21	+9	25
5	Budaia	18	5	6	7	14	24	−10	21
6	Bahrain	18	6	1	11	19	26	−7	19
7	Al Hala	18	6	1	11	28	39	−11	19
8	Al Hilal	18	5	3	10	16	32	−16	18
9	Essa Town	18	4	5	9	21	32	−11	17
10	Jad Hafs	18	4	2	12	22	42	−20	14

Source: rsssf.com
