= 2002 Bahraini Classification League =

Bahraini Classification League
- Season: 2002

Statistics of Bahraini Premier League for the 2002 season.

== Overview ==
It was contested by 18 teams, playing in a single round-robin format. Muharraq Club won the championship. The top 10 teams would go to the next Premier League season, while the bottom 8 teams would form the 2nd Division of the next season.

== League standings ==
Pos	Team	Pld	W	D	L	GF	GA	GD	Pts
1	Muharraq Club	17	15	1	1	53	10	+43	46
2	Al-Ahli	17	15	1	1	46	9	+37	46
3	Bahrain Riffa Club	17	11	3	3	51	14	+37	36
4	Busaiteen Club	17	9	5	3	33	21	+12	32
5	Malkiya Club	17	9	3	5	31	22	+9	30
6	Al-Shabab	17	9	3	5	35	29	+6	30
7	Bahrain	17	8	4	5	29	21	+8	28
8	Al-Najma SC	17	7	5	5	28	19	+9	26
9	Al Hala	17	7	5	5	32	25	+7	26
10	East Riffa Club	17	6	7	4	27	23	+4	25
11	Essa Town	17	6	5	6	31	27	+4	23
12	Budaia	17	4	7	6	14	28	−14	19
13	Al Tadamun	17	4	2	11	21	33	−12	14
14	Sitra Club	17	4	2	11	19	38	−19	14
15	Al Ittihad	17	3	4	10	15	36	−21	13
16	Al Ittifaq	17	1	3	13	16	40	−24	6
17	Al Sahel	17	1	3	13	18	60	−42	6
18	Manama Club	17	1	3	13	13	57	−44	6

Source: rsssf.com
