= 2008–09 Bahrain Classification Soccer League =

Bahraini Premier League
- Season: 2008–09

This season, Bahraini Premier League will be known as the Bahrain Classification Soccer League 2008–09 and will consist of 19 teams which will play each other once. The top 10 teams will join the new Premier League in 2009–10 and the bottom 9 teams will form a new Division 2 championship.

The top two sides enter the 2009 Gulf Club Champions Cup

== Final league table ==
Pos	Team	Pld	W	D	L	GF	GA	GD	Pts
1	Muharraq Club	18	14	3	1	50	9	+41	45
2	Bahrain Riffa Club	18	14	2	2	51	11	+40	44
3	Al Ahli Club	18	13	3	2	34	9	+25	42
4	East Riffa Club	18	12	4	2	38	22	+16	40
5	Busaiteen Club	18	10	2	6	38	22	+16	32
6	Al-Najma SC	18	9	4	5	29	19	+10	31
7	Manama Club	18	9	3	6	38	27	+11	30
8	Al-Shabab Club	18	8	6	4	37	31	+6	30
9	Malkiya	18	8	5	5	23	18	+5	29
10	Al Hala Muharraq	18	9	1	8	29	20	+9	28
11	Al Hadd	18	8	4	6	35	32	+3	28
12	Sitra Club	18	7	4	7	22	25	−3	25
13	Bahrain Club	18	5	7	6	26	21	+5	22
14	Budaiya	18	5	3	10	14	25	−11	18
15	Qalali	18	3	3	12	19	40	−21	12
16	Al Ittihad Bahrain	18	2	4	12	16	41	−25	10
17	Ittifaq Maqaba	18	2	2	14	12	43	−31	8
18	Issa Town	18	1	2	15	11	54	−43	5
19	Tadamun Buri	18	0	2	16	10	63	−53	2

Source: rsssf.com

=== End of season playoff ===
Al Hadd and Al Hala went into an end of season play-off to determine which side would stay in the Premier League for the following season. Al Hala won the game 1-0 after extra time.

Bahrain Classification Soccer League
2008-09 winners
Muharraq Club
4th in a row
31st title
