= 1998–99 Bahraini Premier League =

Bahraini Premier League
- Season: 1998–99

Statistics of Bahraini Premier League for the 1998–99 season.

== Overview ==
It was contested by 10 teams, and Muharraq Club won the championship.

== League standings ==
Pos	Team	Pld	W	D	L	GF	GA	GD	Pts
1	Muharraq Club	18	12	3	3	40	11	+29	39
2	Al-Ahli	18	8	6	4	26	21	+5	30
3	Bahrain Riffa Club	18	7	7	4	31	24	+7	28
4	Bahrain	18	5	8	5	30	29	+1	23
5	Essa Town	18	4	10	4	29	30	−1	22
6	East Riffa Club	18	4	9	5	26	27	−1	21
7	Al Hala	18	3	11	4	20	23	−3	20
8	Besaitin	18	4	7	7	27	29	−2	19
9	Budaia	18	4	7	7	15	33	−18	19
10	Al Hilal	18	3	4	11	17	34	−17	13

Source: rsssf.com
