= 2000–01 Bahraini Premier League =

Bahraini Premier League
- Season: 2000–2001

Statistics of Bahraini Premier League for the 2000–01 season.

== Overview ==
It was contested by 12 teams, and Muharraq Club won the championship.

== League standings ==
Pos	Team	Pld	W	D	L	GF	GA	GD	Pts
1	Muharraq Club	22	16	4	2	62	22	+40	52
2	Busaiteen Club	22	13	6	3	54	30	+24	45
3	West Riffa	22	11	7	4	43	23	+20	40
4	Al-Ahli	22	8	7	7	40	28	+12	31
5	Essa Town	22	9	4	9	37	38	−1	31
6	East Riffa Club	22	7	7	8	31	44	−13	28
7	Bahrain	22	7	6	9	31	32	−1	27
8	Al Hilal	22	5	10	7	31	41	−10	25
9	Al Hala	22	6	7	9	30	44	−14	25
10	Sitra Club	22	5	3	14	23	41	−18	18
11	Qalali	22	4	6	12	23	44	−21	18
12	Malkiya Club	22	5	5	12	29	47	−18	17 (Note: 3 points deducted?)

Source: rsssf.com
