= Bahraini Crown Prince Cup =

- Founded: 2001; 25 years ago
- Abolished: 2009
- Teams: 4
- Related competitions: Khalid Bin Hamad Cup (successor)
- Most championships: Muharraq Club (5)
- 2009 Bahraini Crown Prince Cup

The Bahraini Crown Prince Cup was a Bahraini knockout tournament in men's association football that is played between the top-4 of the Bahraini Premier League in the previous year. The competition was run between 2001 until 2009 and was dominated by Muharraq Club and Bahrain Riffa Club.

== Previous winners ==
- 2001 : Muharraq Club 5-4 Bahrain Riffa Club
- 2002 : Bahrain Riffa Club 3-2 Muharraq Club
- 2003 : Bahrain Riffa Club 3-1 Muharraq Club
- 2004 : Bahrain Riffa Club 2-1 Muharraq Club
- 2005 : Bahrain Riffa Club 3-1 Al Ahli
- 2006 : Muharraq Club 2-1 Bahrain Riffa Club
- 2007 : Muharraq Club 1-0 Al-Najma
- 2008 : Muharraq Club 5-2 Al Ahli
- 2009 : Muharraq Club 2-0 Bahrain Riffa Club

== Top-Performing Clubs ==
Club	Champions
Muharraq Club	5
Bahrain Riffa Club	4
