= 2014–15 Bahrain First Division League =

Bahrain First Division League
- Season: 2014–15

The 2014–15 Bahrain First Division League was the 58th edition of top level football in Bahrain. The title was won by Al-Muharraq for the 33rd time and first time since the 2010–11 Bahrain First Division League campaign. The campaign was one of the most exciting in Bahraini football history with five teams in contention until the final weeks.

== Teams ==
Sitra and Al-Najma were relegated at the end of the previous campaign and replaced by Bahrain Club and East Riffa. Bahrain club bounced back after one season away from the top flight and East Riffa were back after two seasons at the second level.

=== Stadia and locations ===
Locations of teams in the 2014–15 Bahraini League

Club	Location	Stadium
Al Hadd	Al Hidd	
Al Hala	Muharraq	Al Muharraq Stadium
Al-Muharraq	Muharraq	Al Muharraq Stadium
Al-Shabab	Manama	Bahrain National Stadium
Bahrain Club	Muharraq	Al Muharraq Stadium
Bahrain Riffa Club	Riffa	Bahrain National Stadium
Busaiteen Club	Busaiteen	
East Riffa Club	Manama	Al Ahli Stadium
Malkiya	Malkiya	Madinat 'Isa Stadium
Manama Club	Manama	Bahrain National Stadium

== Foreign players ==
Club	Player 1	Player 2	Player 3	Asian Player	Former Players
Al-Hadd	(Brazil) Rico	(Nigeria) Ifedayo Olusegun	(Nigeria) Orok Akarandut	(Jordan) Mohammad Al-Dawud	
Al-Hala	(Ivory Coast) Salifou Fofana	(Nigeria) Nasigba John-Jumbo			
Al-Muharraq	(Brazil) Jhonnattann	(Libya) Ahmed Al-Saghir		(Syria) Nasouh Al Nakdali	(Brazil) Denni
Al-Shabab	(Brazil) Rodrigo Cabeça				(Lebanon) Hassan Chaito
Bahrain Club	(Montenegro) Admir Adrović			(Syria) Yasser Akra	
Bahrain Riffa	(Brazil) João Luiz	(Brazil) Luís Gueguel	(Colombia) Jhon Obregón	(Jordan) Abdallah Deeb	(Brazil) Ozéia (Syria) Aiman Al-Hagri
Busaiteen	(Brazil) Eliel Cruz	(Brazil) Ozéia	(Tunisia) Abdelkrim Koussi	(Syria) Mutaz Kailouni	(Brazil) Tuca (Syria) Israa Hamwiah
East Riffa	(Equatorial Guinea) Ben Konaté	(Serbia) Mladen Jovancic			
Malkiya	(Moldova) Valeriu Andronic	(Moldova) Victor Gonța	(Nigeria) John Samuel		
Manama					(Brazil) Thiago Augusto (Curaçao) Sendley Bito (Morocco) Tarik El Janaby (Syria) Radwan Kalaji

== League table ==
Pos	Team	Pld	W	D	L	GF	GA	GD	Pts	Qualification or relegation
1	Al-Muharraq (C)	18	12	4	2	41	18	+23	40	Qualification to the 2016 AFC Champions League Preliminary Round
2	Al Hadd	18	12	3	3	29	15	+14	39	Qualification to the 2016 AFC Cup Group Stage
3	Manama Club	18	10	3	5	31	20	+11	33	Qualification to the 2016 GCC Champions League Group Stage
4	East Riffa	18	10	3	5	30	24	+6	33	
5	Al-Riffa	18	9	4	5	26	17	+9	31	
6	Busaiteen	18	5	4	9	17	31	−14	19	
7	Al Hala	18	5	4	9	22	39	−17	19	
8	Malkiya	18	5	3	10	17	28	−11	18	
9	Bahrain Club	18	3	4	11	22	29	−7	13	Relegation to the 2015–16 Bahraini Second Division
10	Al-Shabab Manama	18	2	2	14	12	26	−14	8	Relegation to the 2015–16 Bahraini Second Division

Updated to match(es) played on 1 June 2015. Source: Fudbal91
Rules for classification: 1) points; 2) goal difference; 3) number of goals scored.
(C) Champions
