= 2009 Bahraini FA Cup =

Tournament details
- Teams: 19

Final positions
- Champions: Muharraq Club
- Runners-up: Al Najma Club

Tournament statistics
- Matches played: 39
- Goals scored: 114 (2.92 per match)

The 2009 Bahraini FA Cup was the seventh edition of the Bahraini FA Cup. It started on 24 December 2008.

A total of 19 teams entered the competition from the group stage. Muharraq Club won the competition after defeating Al Najma Club 1–0 in the final.

== Group stage ==
Teams were drawn into four groups: three groups of five teams and one group of four teams. The group winners will qualify for the semi-finals.

=== Group 1 ===
Final Standings

Team	Pld	W	D	L	GF	GA	GD	Pts
(Bahrain) Al Najma Club	4	2	1	1	7	3	+4	7
(Bahrain) Al-Ahli (Manama)	4	2	1	1	6	4	+2	7
(Bahrain) East Riffa Club	4	2	0	2	10	7	+3	6
(Bahrain) Al Ittifaq (Maqaba)	4	1	1	2	1	3	-2	4
(Bahrain) Budaiya Club	4	0	3	1	1	8	-7	3

==== Results ====
24 December 2008
Al Najma Club	1–1	Budaiya Club
Al-Ahli (Manama)	4–1	East Riffa Club
31 December 2008
Budaiya Club	0–0	Al Ittifaq (Maqaba)
East Riffa Club	0–3	Al Najma Club
15 January 2009
Al Najma Club	3–1	Al-Ahli (Manama)
Al Ittifaq (Maqaba)	0–2	East Riffa Club
20 January 2009
Al-Ahli (Manama)	1–0	Al Ittifaq (Maqaba)
East Riffa Club	7–0	Budaiya Club
29 January 2009
Budaiya Club	0–0	Al-Ahli (Manama)
Al Ittifaq (Maqaba)	1–0	Al Najma Club

=== Group 2 ===
Final Standings

Team	Pld	W	D	L	GF	GA	GD	Pts
Bahrain Riffa Club	4	3	1	0	8	2	+6	10
(Bahrain) Al-Shabab Club	4	2	1	1	7	4	+3	7
(Bahrain) Sitra Club	4	1	1	2	8	9	-1	4
(Bahrain) Qalali Club	4	1	1	2	4	8	-4	4
(Bahrain) Al Hala	4	0	2	2	7	11	-4	2

==== Results ====
25 December 2008
Bahrain Riffa Club	2–1	Al-Shabab Club
Qalali Club	1–4	Sitra Club
1 January 2009
Sitra Club	4–4	Al Hala
Al-Shabab Club	2–0	Qalali Club
11 January 2009
Qalali Club	1–1	Bahrain Riffa Club
15 January 2009
Al Hala	2–2	Al-Shabab Club
21 January 2009
Bahrain Riffa Club	3–0	Al Hala
23 January 2009
Al-Shabab Club	2–0	Sitra Club
30 January 2009
Al Hala	1–2	Qalali Club
Sitra Club	0–2	Bahrain Riffa Club

=== Group 3 ===
Final Standings:

Team	Pld	W	D	L	GF	GA	GD	Pts
(Bahrain) Muharraq Club	4	3	1	0	14	2	+12	10
(Bahrain) Al Hadd Club	4	3	0	1	11	4	+7	9
(Bahrain) Manama Club	4	2	1	1	5	3	+2	7
(Bahrain) Al Tadamun Buri	4	1	0	3	2	13	-11	3
(Bahrain) Issa Town	4	0	0	4	0	10	-10	0

==== Results ====
26 December 2008
Al Tadamun Buri	1–2	Manama Club
Muharraq Club	4–1	Al Hadd Club
2 January 2009
Manama Club	2–0	Issa Town
Al Hadd Club	5–0	Al Tadamun Buri
12 January 2009
Al Tadamun Buri	0–6	Muharraq Club
Issa Town	0–4	Al Hadd Club
22 January 2009
Muharraq Club	3–0	Issa Town
Al Hadd Club	1–0	Manama Club
31 January 2009
Manama Club	1–1	Muharraq Club
Issa Town	0–1	Al Tadamun Buri

=== Group 4 ===
Final standings

Team	Pld	W	D	L	GF	GA	GD	Pts
(Bahrain) Busaiteen Club	3	1	2	0	7	3	+4	5
Bahrain Club	3	1	2	0	5	3	+2	5
(Bahrain) Malkiya Club	3	0	3	0	4	4	0	3
Al Ittihad (Bahrain)	3	0	1	2	2	8	-6	1

==== Results ====
27 December 2008
Malkiya Club	1–1	Al Ittihad
Busaiteen Club	1–1	Bahrain Club
3 January 2009
Bahrain Club	2–2	Malkiya Club
Al Ittihad	1–5	Busaiteen Club
13 January 2009
Al Ittihad	0–2	Bahrain Club
Busaiteen Club	1–1	Malkiya Club

== Semi-finals ==
4 February 2009

Al Najma Club	1–0	Busaiteen Club
	Report

5 February 2009

Bahrain Riffa Club	2–2 (a.e.t.)	Muharraq Club
	Report
Penalties
	1–4

== Final ==
9 February 2009

Al Najma Club	0–1	Muharraq Club
	Report	Ali Amer 81'
