= 1983–84 Bahraini Premier League =

Bahraini Premier League
- Season: 1983–84

Statistics of Bahraini Premier League for the 1983–84 season.

== Overview ==
It was contested by 9 teams, and Muharraq Club won the championship.

== League standings ==
| Pos | Team | Pld | Pts |
|---|---|---|---|
| 1 | Muharraq Club | 16 | 23 |
| 2 | Bahrain | 16 | 21 |
| 3 | East Riffa Club | 16 | 20 |
| 4 | Bahrain Riffa Club | 16 | 16 |
| 5 | Al Hala | 16 | 15 |
| 6 | Al Qadisiya | 16 | 14 |
| 7 | Budaiya | 16 | 12 |
| 8 | Al-Ahli | 16 | 12 |
| 9 | Al Wehda | 16 | 11 |

Source: rsssf.com
