= 1984–85 Bahraini Premier League =

Bahraini Premier League
- Season: 1984–85

Statistics of Bahraini Premier League in season 1984–85.

== Overview ==
It was contested by 9 teams, and Bahrain won the championship.

== League standings ==
| Pos | Team | Pld | W | D | L | GF | GA | GD | Pts |
|---|---|---|---|---|---|---|---|---|---|
| 1 | Bahrain | 16 | 11 | 2 | 3 | 27 | 14 | +13 | 24 |
| 2 | Muharraq Club | 16 | 9 | 4 | 3 | 34 | 10 | +24 | 22 |
| 3 | Bahrain Riffa Club | 16 | 9 | 4 | 3 | 34 | 14 | +20 | 22 |
| 4 | East Riffa Club | 16 | 8 | 3 | 5 | 24 | 24 | 0 | 19 |
| 5 | Al Hala | 16 | 5 | 6 | 5 | 15 | 20 | −5 | 16 |
| 6 | Al-Ahli | 16 | 5 | 3 | 8 | 20 | 17 | +3 | 13 |
| 7 | Jad Hafs | 16 | 4 | 3 | 9 | 18 | 24 | −6 | 11 |
| 8 | Al Qadisiya | 16 | 4 | 3 | 9 | 15 | 30 | −15 | 11 |
| 9 | Budaiya | 16 | 2 | 2 | 12 | 10 | 45 | −35 | 6 |

Source: rsssf.com
