= Lotfi Benzarti =

Tunisian football manager

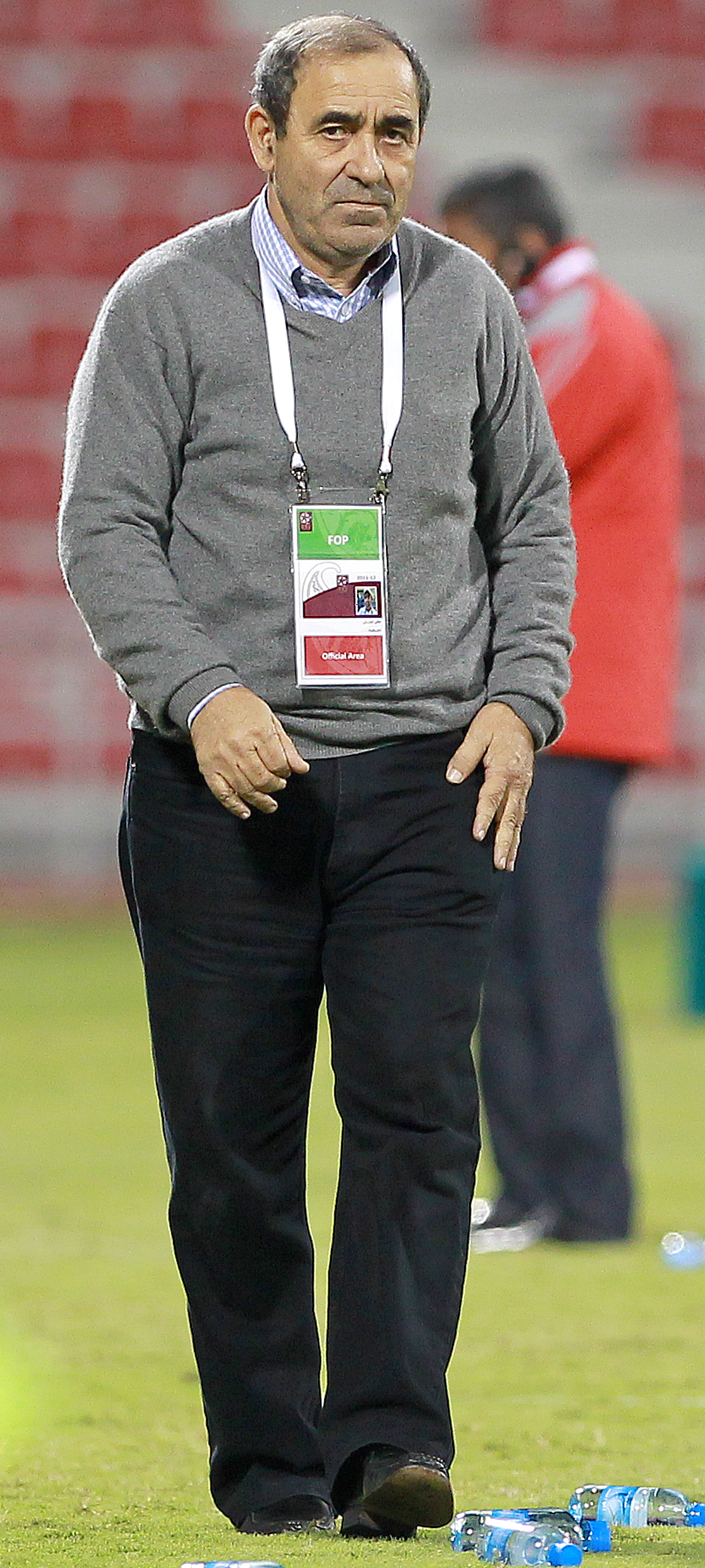

Personal information
- Full name: Lotfi Benzarti
- Date of birth: 4 December 1952 (age 73)
- Place of birth: Monastir, Tunisia
- Position: Defender

Senior career*
Years	Team	Apps	(Gls)
1966–1977	US Monastir		

Managerial career
- 1984–1986: US Monastir
- 1986–1988: Olympique Béja
- 1988–1991: Al-Muharraq
- 1991–1992: Sohar
- 1992–1993: Al Khaleej
- 1993–1994: Al-Shabab Manama
- 1994–1995: Al-Muharraq
- 1995–1996: Al-Nasr Dubai
- 1996–1997: Al-Muharraq
- 1997–1999: US Monastir
- 1999–2000: Étoile du Sahel
- 2000–2001: Stade Tunisien
- 2001–2004: US Monastir
- 2004–2006: Al Wehda
- 2006–2007: Fujairah
- 2007: Khaleej
- 2007: Najran
- 2007–2008: Al-Shaab
- 2008–2011: Baniyas
- 2011: Al Wehda
- 2011: Al Kharaitiyat
- 2011–2012: Emirates
- 2012: Ittihad Kalba
- 2013: US Monastir
- 2014–2015: Fujairah
- * Club domestic league appearances and goals

Lotfi Benzarti (Arabic: لطفي البنزرتي; born 4 December 1952) is a Tunisian professional football manager and former player. (Note: Lotfi Benzarti at WorldFootball.net)

He is the younger brother of coach Faouzi Benzarti.

== Career ==
He played in Tunisia for his home club US Monastir. He started his coaching career in the same team before passing through some experiences in Bahrain, Oman, United Arab Emirates, Saudi Arabia and Qatar. He also coached Étoile du Sahel and won the CAF Cup with them.

== Achievements ==
=== Domestic competitions ===
- Bahraini Premier League
  - Champions : 1990–91, 1994–95
- Bahraini King's Cup
  - Winners : 1989, 1990, 1995, 1997
- UAE Super Cup
  - Winners : 1996

=== Continental competitions ===
- CAF Cup
  - Winners : 1999
