= 2007–08 Bahraini Premier League =

Bahraini Premier League
- Season: 2007–08

Statistics of Bahraini Premier League for the 2007–08 season.

== Overview ==
It was contested by 12 teams, and Muharraq Club won the championship.

== League standings ==
Pos	Team	Pld	W	D	L	GF	GA	GD	Pts
1	Muharraq Club	22	16	4	2	66	14	+52	52
2	Busaiteen Club	22	13	3	6	45	23	+22	42
3	Al-Ahli	22	13	3	6	36	28	+8	42
4	Bahrain Riffa Club	22	11	7	4	40	22	+18	40
5	East Riffa Club	22	9	3	10	28	36	−8	30
6	Al-Najma SC	22	7	7	8	33	26	+7	28
7	Manama Club	22	8	4	10	27	36	−9	28
8	Al Ittihad	22	6	6	10	26	39	−13	24
9	Al Hala	22	6	4	12	28	50	−22	22
10	Al-Shabab	22	5	6	11	30	44	−14	21
11	Al Hadd	22	5	5	12	20	39	−19	20
12	Bahrain	22	5	4	13	19	41	−22	19

Source: rsssf.com
