= Duque (footballer) =

Brazilian footballer

Personal information
- Full name: Davi Ferreira
- Date of birth: 15 May 1926
- Place of birth: Belo Horizonte, Brazil
- Date of death: 16 July 2017 (aged 91)
- Place of death: Rio de Janeiro, Brazil
- Position: Defender

Youth career
- Cruzeiro

Senior career*
Years	Team	Apps	(Gls)
1946–1952	Cruzeiro	127	(0)
1953–1954	Vasco da Gama		
1955–1956	Canto do Rio		
1956	Fluminense	67	(0)

Managerial career
- 1962–1968: Náutico
- 1969: Bonsucesso
- 1969–1971: Santa Cruz
- 1972: Corinthians
- 1972: América Mineiro
- 1973–1974: Fluminense
- 1975: Sport Recife
- 1976–1977: Corinthians
- 1978: Náutico
- 1979: Muharraq
- 1980: Santa Cruz
- 1980: Bahia
- 1981: Olaria
- 1982: América Mineiro
- 1984: Ivory Coast
- 1986: Confiança
- 1990: Cruzeiro
- 1991–1992: Muharraq
- * Club domestic league appearances and goals as of 14 March 2024

Davi Ferreira (15 May 1926 – 16 July 2017), better known as Duque, was a Brazilian professional footballer and manager, who played as a defender.

== Playing career ==
Formed in Cruzeiro's youth categories, Duque played as a defender. He made 127 appearances for Cruzeiro from 1946 to 1952, in addition to playing for Vasco da Gama, Fluminense and Canto do Rio.

== Managerial career ==
As coach Duque was responsible for commanding what is considered the best Náutico team in history, four times state champion and runner-up in the Taça Brasil. He was also champion two times with Santa Cruz, as well as Campeonato Carioca champion in 1973 with Fluminense. In 1976 he was runner-up again, this time with Corinthians in the Brazilian Championship. In 1981 he won the first edition of Campeonato Brasileiro Série C, the Taça de Bronze, with Olaria, in addition to winning the Bahrain league with Muharraq SC.

== Honours ==
=== Manager ===
Náutico

- Campeonato Pernambucano: 1964, 1966, 1967, 1968

Santa Cruz

- Campeonato Pernambucano: 1970, 1971

Fluminense

- Campeonato Carioca: 1973

Sport

- Campeonato Pernambucano: 1975

Olaria

- Campeonato Brasileiro Série C: 1981

Muharraq

- Bahraini Premier League: 1991–92

== Death ==
Duque died at the age of 91 on 16 July 2017 in the city of Rio de Janeiro.
