= 1995–96 Bahraini Premier League =

Football league season

Bahraini Premier League
- Season: 1995–96

Statistics of Bahraini Premier League for the 1995–96 season.

== Overview ==
Al-Ahli won the championship.

== Championship playoff ==
Pos	Team	Pld	W	D	L	GF	GA	GD	Pts
1	Al-Ahli	3	3	0	0	7	2	+5	9
2	Muharraq Club	3	2	0	1	6	3	+3	6
3	Bahrain	3	1	0	2	2	4	−2	3
4	Al Wehda	3	0	0	3	3	9	−6	0

Source: rsssf.com
