= 1977–78 Bahraini Premier League =

Bahraini Premier League
- Season: 1977–78

Statistics of Bahraini Premier League in the 1977–78 season.

== Overview ==
Bahrain Club won the championship.
