= 1980–81 Bahraini Premier League =

Bahraini Premier League
- Season: 1980–81

Statistics of Bahraini Premier League in the 1980–81 season.

== Overview ==
Bahrain Club won the championship.
