= 2005 Bahraini Premier League =

Bahraini Premier League
- Season: 2004–05

Statistics of Bahraini Premier League for the 2004–05 season.

== Overview ==
It was contested by 10 teams, and Bahrain Riffa Club won the championship.

== League standings ==
Pos	Team	Pld	W	D	L	GF	GA	GD	Pts
1	Bahrain Riffa Club	18	13	1	4	40	18	+22	40
2	Muharraq Club	18	10	6	2	36	18	+18	36
3	Al-Ahli	18	10	3	5	30	26	+4	33
4	Al-Shabab	18	9	5	4	33	28	+5	32
5	Al-Najma SC	18	9	4	5	33	18	+15	31
6	Busaiteen Club	18	6	5	7	25	28	−3	23
7	Bahrain	18	5	3	10	21	30	−9	18
8	East Riffa Club	18	5	2	11	26	33	−7	17
9	Manama Club	18	4	3	11	22	41	−19	15
10	Al Hala	18	2	2	14	16	42	−26	8

Source: rsssf.com
