= 2006–07 Bahraini Premier League =

Bahraini Premier League
- Season: 2006–2007
- Champions: Al-Muharraq
- Relegated: Sitra; Al-Malkiya
- Top goalscorer: Rico (25 goals)

Statistics of Bahraini Premier League for the 2006–07 season.

== Overview ==
It was contested by 12 teams, and Muharraq Club won the championship.

== League standings ==
Pos	Team	Pld	W	D	L	GF	GA	GD	Pts
1	Muharraq Club	22	17	2	3	56	17	+39	53
2	Bahrain Riffa Club	22	12	5	5	34	16	+18	41
3	Al-Najma SC	22	11	5	6	32	23	+9	38
4	Busaiteen Club	22	9	6	7	35	27	+8	33
5	Bahrain	22	7	8	7	27	32	−5	29
6	Al Hala	22	8	4	10	42	44	−2	28
7	Al-Shabab	22	6	9	7	30	29	+1	27
8	Al-Ahli	22	6	9	7	29	30	−1	27
9	East Riffa Club	22	6	9	7	27	32	−5	27
10	Malkiya Club	22	4	10	8	22	30	−8	22
11	Manama Club	22	6	4	12	23	38	−15	22
12	Sitra Club	22	3	3	16	17	56	−39	12

Source: rsssf.com
