= 2004 Bahraini Premier League =

Season of the Bahraini Premier League

Bahraini Premier League
- Season: 2004

The 2004 Bahraini Premier League was contested by 10 teams, and Muharraq Club won the championship.

== League standings ==
Pos	Team	Pld	W	D	L	GF	GA	GD	Pts
1	Muharraq Club	18	15	3	0	45	9	+36	48
2	Bahrain Riffa Club	18	10	6	2	42	17	+25	36
3	Al-Ahli	18	8	6	4	30	20	+10	30
4	Busaiteen Club	18	6	5	7	32	30	+2	23
5	Bahrain	18	6	5	7	30	33	−3	23
6	Al-Shabab	18	5	6	7	24	27	−3	21
7	East Riffa Club	18	5	4	9	21	39	−18	19
8	Al Hala	18	4	6	8	30	36	−6	18
9	Al-Najma SC	18	4	5	9	23	37	−14	17
10	Al Sahel	18	2	4	12	16	45	−29	10

Source: rsssf.com
