= 2005–06 Bahraini Premier League =

Bahraini Premier League
- Season: 2005–06

Statistics of Bahraini Premier League for the 2005–06 season.

== Overview ==
It was contested by 10 teams, and Muharraq Club won the championship.

== League standings ==
| Pos | Team | Pld | W | D | L | GF | GA | GD | Pts |
|---|---|---|---|---|---|---|---|---|---|
| 1 | Muharraq Club | 18 | 11 | 5 | 2 | 29 | 17 | +12 | 38 |
| 2 | Al-Ahli | 18 | 10 | 7 | 1 | 47 | 20 | +27 | 37 |
| 3 | Bahrain Riffa Club | 18 | 9 | 6 | 3 | 36 | 17 | +19 | 33 |
| 4 | Al-Najma SC | 18 | 7 | 4 | 7 | 29 | 28 | +1 | 25 |
| 5 | Sitra Club | 18 | 6 | 4 | 8 | 25 | 33 | −8 | 22 |
| 6 | Malkiya Club | 18 | 5 | 5 | 8 | 27 | 23 | +4 | 20 |
| 7 | East Riffa Club | 18 | 5 | 5 | 8 | 29 | 36 | −7 | 20 |
| 8 | Busaiteen Club | 18 | 5 | 5 | 8 | 19 | 29 | −10 | 20 |
| 9 | Al-Shabab | 18 | 5 | 3 | 10 | 21 | 39 | −18 | 18 |
| 10 | Bahrain | 18 | 3 | 4 | 11 | 16 | 36 | −20 | 13 |

Source: rsssf.com
