= 1993–94 Bahraini Premier League =

Bahraini Premier League
- Season: 1993–94

Statistics of Bahraini Premier League for the 1993–94 season.

== Overview ==
East Riffa Club won the championship.
