= 1967–68 Bahraini Premier League =

Bahraini Premier League
- Season: 1967–68

Statistics of Bahraini Premier League in the 1967–68 season.

== Overview ==
Bahrain Club won the championship.
