= 1994–95 Bahraini Premier League =

Bahraini Premier League
- Season: 1994–95

Statistics of Bahraini Premier League for the 1994–95 season.

== Overview ==
It was contested by 10 teams, and Muharraq Club won the championship.

== League standings ==
Pos	Team	Pld	W	D	L	GF	GA	GD	Pts
1	Muharraq Club	18	11	5	2	29	16	+13	27
2	Bahrain Riffa Club	18	10	4	4	22	12	+10	24
3	East Riffa Club	18	9	4	5	34	21	+13	22
4	Bahrain	18	7	6	5	27	18	+9	20
5	Al Wehda	18	7	6	5	18	14	+4	20
6	Al-Ahli	18	9	0	9	22	19	+3	18
7	Al Qadisiya	18	7	3	8	19	22	−3	17
8	Budaiya	18	4	8	6	11	16	−5	16
9	Jad Hafs	18	3	4	11	9	33	−24	10
10	Manama Club	18	2	2	14	16	36	−20	6

Source: rsssf.com
