= 1978–79 Bahraini Premier League =

Bahraini Premier League
- Season: 1978–79

Statistics of Bahraini Premier League in the 1978–79 season.

== Overview ==
Al Hala won the championship.
