= 1961–62 Bahraini Premier League =

Bahraini Premier League
- Season: 1961–62

Statistics of Bahraini Premier League in the 1961–62 season.

== Overview ==
Muharraq Club won the championship.
