= 1973–74 Bahraini Premier League =

Statistics of Bahraini Premier League in the 1973–74 season

Bahraini Premier League
- Season: 1973–74

Statistics of Bahraini Premier League in the 1973–74 season.

== Overview ==
Muharraq Club won the championship.
