= 1976–77 Bahraini Premier League =

Bahraini Premier League
- Season: 1976–77

Statistics of Bahraini Premier League in the 1976–77 season.

== Overview ==
Al-Ahli won the championship.
