= 1982–83 Bahraini Premier League =

Bahraini Premier League
- Season: 1982–83

Statistics of Bahraini Premier League in the 1982–83 season.

== Overview ==
Muharraq Club won the championship.
