= 1957–58 Bahraini Premier League =

Bahraini Premier League
- Season: 1957–58

The 1957–58 Bahraini Premier League was won by Muharraq Club.
