= 1971–72 Bahraini Premier League =

Bahraini Premier League
- Season: 1971–72

Statistics of Bahraini Premier League in the 1971–72 season.

== Overview ==
Al-Ahli won the championship.
