= 2004 Bahraini Crown Prince Cup =

2004 Crown Prince Cup
Tournament details
- Host country: Bahrain
- Dates: 18 June – 25 June
- Teams: 4

Final positions
- Champions: Bahrain Riffa Club (3rd title)

The 2004 Bahraini Crown Prince Cup was the 4th edition of the annual football cup tournament for the cup. This edition featured the top four sides from the Bahraini Premier League 2003-04 season.

== Bracket ==
Semi-finals
2004-06-18 - Manama
Bahrain Riffa Club | 1 (4)
(Bahrain) Al-Ahli (Manama) | 1 (3)
2004-06-19 - Manama
(Bahrain) Muharraq Club | 2
(Bahrain) Busaiteen Club | 1

Final
2004-06-25 - Manama
Bahrain Riffa Club | 2
(Bahrain) Muharraq Club | 1

Source: RSSSF

Bahraini Crown Prince Cup
2004 Winners
Bahrain Riffa Club
3rd Title
3rd in a row
