= 1975–76 Bahraini Premier League =

Bahraini Premier League
- Season: 1975–76

Statistics of Bahraini Premier League in the 1975–76 season.

== Overview ==
Muharraq Club won the championship.
