= 1981–82 Bahraini Premier League =

Bahraini Premier League
- Season: 1981–82

Statistics of Bahraini Premier League in the 1981–82 season.

== Overview ==
Bahrain Riffa Club won the championship.
