= 1992–93 Bahraini Premier League =

Bahraini Premier League
- Season: 1992–93

Statistics of Bahraini Premier League for the 1992–93 season.

== Overview ==
Bahrain Riffa Club won the championship.
