= 1989–90 Bahraini Premier League =

Bahraini Premier League
- Season: 1989–90

Statistics of Bahraini Premier League for the 1989–90 season.

== Overview ==
Bahrain Riffa Club won the championship.
