= 1968–69 Bahraini Premier League =

Season of the Bahraini Premier League

Bahraini Premier League
- Season: 1968–69

Statistics of Bahraini Premier League in the 1968–69 season.

== Overview ==
Al-Ahli won the championship.
