= 1966–67 Bahraini Premier League =

Bahraini Premier League
- Season: 1966–67

Statistics of Bahraini Premier League in the 1966–67 season.

== Overview ==
Muharraq Club won the championship.
