= 1960–61 Bahraini Premier League =

Bahraini Premier League
- Season: 1960–61

Statistics of Bahraini Premier League in the 1960–61 season.

== Overview ==
Muharraq Club won the championship.
