= Pedro Gómez Carmona =

Spanish football manager (born 1982)

Personal information
- Date of birth: 7 June 1982 (age 44)
- Place of birth: Vitoria, Spain

Managerial career
- Years: Team
- 2005–2007: Getafe (youth)
- 2007–2008: Pozuelo de Alarcón (assistant)
- 2010–2011: Al-Hilal (assistant)
- 2011–2012: Baniyas (assistant)
- 2012–2013: Bahrain (assistant)
- 2014-2015: Betis (assistant)
- 2014–2015: Al-Wasl (assistant)
- 2015–2016: Valencia (assistant)
- 2016–2017: Estoril
- 2018–2019: East Riffa
- 2020–2022: Al-Wasl Reserve (assistant)
- 2024: Deportes Antofagasta

Pedro Gómez Carmona (born 7 June 1982) is a Spanish professional football manager.

== Career ==
Born in Vitoria-Gasteiz, Álava, Spain, Carmona began his career in with Getafe CF's youth setup. In 2005, he was appointed assistant manager of Tercera División side CF Pozuelo de Alarcón.

In 2010 Carmona accepted an offer to join Saudi Arabian Al-Hilal FC's coaching staff. That season, the team won the King's Cup and the Saudi Professional League, the latter undefeated.

In November 2011, Carmona was named Gabriel Calderón's assistant at Baniyas SC. The club reached the semifinals of the UAE President's Cup and the Round of 16 of the AFC Champions League, repeating the best outcome of an Emirati club in the latter competition.

Carmona remained as Calderón's second in the following years, at Bahrain national football team, Real Betis and Al-Wasl FC. On 24 February 2016, he joined Valencia CF's technical staff.

On 12 December 2016, Carmona was appointed manager of Primeira Liga's G.D. Estoril Praia. Under his guidance, the club reached the semifinals of the Taça de Portugal for the first time in seventy-three years; on 8 March 2017, however, he was sacked.

On 5 January 2018, Carmona was appointed Real Murcia's director of football. Dismissed on 20 March, he was appointed at the helm of Bahraini Premier League side East Riffa Club on 8 June.

In his sole season in the Middle East, Carmona guided East Riffa to the best start in the league's history, in addition to winning the FA Cup. He left in May 2019, seeking new challenges.

In October 2020 he returns as an assistant to the Emirati team of Al-Wasl in Dubai, awarded by the International Federation of Football History and Statistics as the best club of the 20th century in their country. In March 2021 he renews with the club until June 2023 and, in addition, he is appointed head coach of the reserve team.

In the second half of 2024, Gómez was announced as manager of Deportes Antofagasta in the Primera B de Chile. However, he couldn't assume due to administrative issues since his UEFA Pro Licence was not validated by CONMEBOL.

== Milestones ==
- Champion of the Federation Cup of Bahrain (2019) with the East Riffa Club.
- Runner-up in the UAE President's Cup (2012) with Baniyas Sport Club.
- Saudi Arabian Pro League Champion (2011) with Al Hilal Saudí Football Club.
- Champion of the Crown Prince Cup of Saudi Arabia (2011) with Al Hilal Saudí Football Club.
