= 2003 Bahraini Crown Prince Cup =

2003 Crown Prince Cup
Tournament details
- Host country: Bahrain
- Dates: 19 June – 26 June
- Teams: 4

Final positions
- Champions: Bahrain Riffa Club (2nd title)

The 2003 Bahraini Crown Prince Cup was the 3rd edition of the annual football cup tournament for the cup. This edition featured the top four sides from the Bahraini Premier League 2002-03 season.

== Bracket ==
Semi-finals
2003-06-19 - Manama
Bahrain Riffa Club	3
(Bahrain) Busaiteen Club	1
2003-06-20 - Manama
(Bahrain) Muharraq Club	4
(Bahrain) Al-Ahli (Manama)	0

Final
2003-06-26 - Manama
Bahrain Riffa Club	3
(Bahrain) Muharraq Club	1

Bahraini Crown Prince Cup
2003 Winners
Bahrain Riffa Club
2nd Title
