= 1988–89 Bahraini Premier League =

Bahraini Premier League
- Season: 1988–89

Statistics of Bahraini Premier League for the 1988–89 season.

== Overview ==
Bahrain Club won the championship.
