= 2002–03 Bahraini Premier League =

Bahraini Premier League
- Season: 2002–03

Statistics of Bahraini Premier League for the 2002–03 season.

== Overview ==
It was contested by 10 teams, and Bahrain Riffa Club won the championship.

== League standings ==
Pos	Team	Pld	W	D	L	GF	GA	GD	Pts
1	Bahrain Riffa Club	18	13	1	4	48	20	+28	40
2	Muharraq Club	18	10	4	4	44	22	+22	34
3	Al-Ahli	18	9	5	4	46	30	+16	32
4	Busaiteen Club	18	8	4	6	28	23	+5	28
5	Al Hala	18	6	4	8	36	40	−4	22
6	East Riffa Club	18	6	4	8	29	42	−13	22
7	Bahrain	18	5	6	7	22	26	−4	21
8	Al-Shabab	18	5	4	9	25	40	−15	19
9	Al-Najma SC	18	4	6	8	25	36	−11	18
10	Malkiya Club	18	3	4	11	20	44	−24	13

Source: rsssf.com
