= 1996–97 Bahraini Premier League =

Bahraini Premier League
- Season: 1996–97

Statistics of Bahraini Premier League for the 1996–97 season.

== Overview ==
Bahrain Riffa Club won the championship.
