= 2005 Bahraini Crown Prince Cup =

2005 Crown Prince Cup
Tournament details
- Host country: Bahrain
- Dates: 10 May – 16 May
- Teams: 4

Final positions
- Champions: Bahrain Riffa Club (4th title)

The 2005 Bahraini Crown Prince Cup was the 5th edition of the annual football cup tournament for the cup. This edition featured the top four sides from the Bahraini Premier League 2004-05 season.

== Bracket ==
Semi-finals
2005-05-10 - Manama
Bahrain Riffa Club | 2
(Bahrain) Al Shabab | 1
2005-05-11 - Manama
(Bahrain) Muharraq Club | 0
(Bahrain) Al-Ahli (Manama) | 2

Final
2005-05-16 - Manama
Bahrain Riffa Club | 3
(Bahrain) Al-Ahli (Manama) | 1

Source: RSSSF

Bahraini Crown Prince Cup
2005 Winners
Bahrain Riffa Club
4th Title
4th in a row
