= Salman Sharida =

Bahraini footballer and coach (born 1952)

Salman Shareeda
Personal information
- Full name: Salman Ahmed Rashed Shareeda
- Date of birth: 19 May 1952 (age 74)
- Place of birth: Muharraq, Bahrain
- Position: Midfielder

Youth career
- 1960s–1972: Al-Muharraq

Senior career*
Years	Team	Apps	(Gls)
1972–1982	Al-Muharraq		

International career
1973	Bahrain U20		
1974–1979	Bahrain		

Managerial career
- 1980s: Al-Muharraq (youth)
- 1987–1988: Bahrain U20
- 2000: Bahrain
- 2005–2007: Pakistan
- 2006: Pakistan U23
- 2007–2008: Al-Muharraq
- 2009–2010: Al-Arabi
- 2010–2011: Bahrain
- 2011: Bahrain U20
- 2013–2014: Al-Muharraq
- 2015–2016: Hidd
- 2016–2017: Riffa
- 2018: Al-Muharraq
- 2021: Hidd
- * Club domestic league appearances and goals

Salman Ahmed Rashed Shareeda (Arabic: سلمان أحمد راشد شريدة; born 19 May 1952) is a Bahraini football coach and former player who played as a midfielder.

== Club career ==
Shareeda began his youth career at Al-Muharraq's youth sector in the late 1960s, coached by his older brother Rashid. He made his first-team debut in the 1972–73 Bahraini Premier League, becoming a key player for the club by helping them win numerous domestic titles. On 16 February 1973, he played in an exhibition match against the touring Brazilian team Santos which included football legend Pele, in which Santos won 7–1. Shareeda retired as a player in 1981, due to injury problems.

== International career ==
Shareeda played for the Bahrain under-20s at the 1973 AFC Youth Championship in Iran. He played for the senior team at the 1974 Asian Games, also in Iran, and at the 3rd Arabian Gulf Cup in 1974, in Kuwait. Due to an injury, he was unable to participate in the 4th Arabian Gulf Cup in Qatar two years later.

Shareeda played the opening game of the 5th Arabian Gulf Cup, held in 1979, against hosts Iraq; this was ultimately his last international game, as he withdrew injured.

== Managerial career ==
Sharida began coaching in the late 1980s, as head coach of Al-Muharraq's youth sector. He then coached the Bahrain under-20s at the 1987 FIFA World Youth Championship in Chile.

Having already coached the Bahrain national team, Sharida was appointed head coach of the Pakistan national team on a one-year contract in October 2005, becoming Pakistan's first head coach from the Gulf region, and the first Bahraini to coach outside of Bahrain. Sharida coached Pakistan at the 2005 SAFF Championship. He also coached Pakistan under-23, leading them to the gold medal at the 2006 South Asian Games, losing some very close games in the 2006 Asian Games, against Japan 3-2 and against the UAE 2–1.

In 2011, Shareeda was coach of the Bahrain Olympic team; he was dismissed in December.

In 2013 and 2014, Sharida took charge of Al-Muharraq. He coached Hidd in 2015 and 2016. In October 2016, Sharida was appointed head coach of Riffa. He coached Al-Muharraq in 2018, and Hidd since 2021.
