= 1956–57 Bahraini Premier League =

Bahraini Premier League
- Season: 1956–57

Statistics of Bahraini Premier League in the 1956–57 season.

== Overview ==
Muharraq Club won the championship.
