= 1964–65 Bahraini Premier League =

Bahraini Premier League
- Season: 1964–65

Statistics of Bahraini Premier League in the 1964–65 season.

== Overview ==
Muharraq Club won the championship.
