= 1963–64 Bahraini Premier League =

Bahraini Premier League
- Season: 1963–64

Statistics of Bahraini Premier League in the 1963–64 season.

== Overview ==
Muharraq Club won the championship.
