= 1969–70 Bahraini Premier League =

Bahraini Premier League
- Season: 1969–70

Statistics of Bahraini Premier League in the 1969–70 season.

== Overview ==
Muharraq Club won the championship.
