= 1979–80 Bahraini Premier League =

Bahraini Premier League
- Season: 1979–80

Statistics of Bahraini Premier League in the 1979–80 season.

== Overview ==
Muharraq Club won the championship.
