= 1958–59 Bahraini Premier League =

Bahraini Premier League
- Season: 1957–58

Statistics of Bahraini Premier League in the 1958–59 season.

== Overview ==
Al-Nasr won the championship.
