= 2002 Bahraini Crown Prince Cup =

2002 Crown Prince Cup
Tournament details
- Host country: Bahrain
- Dates: 29 May – 3 June
- Teams: 4

Final positions
- Champions: Bahrain Riffa Club (1st title)

The 2002 Bahraini Crown Prince Cup was the 2nd edition of the annual football cup tournament for the cup. This edition featured the top four sides, down four from the 2001 edition, from the Bahraini Premier League 2001-02 season.

== Bracket ==
Semi-finals
2002-05-29 - Manama
(Bahrain) Muharraq Club	4
(Bahrain) Busaiteen Club	2
2002-05-30 - Manama
Bahrain Riffa Club	2
(Bahrain) Al-Ahli (Manama)	1

Final
2002-06-03 - Manama
(Bahrain) Muharraq Club	2
Bahrain Riffa Club	3

Source: RSSSF

Bahraini Crown Prince Cup
2002 Winners
Bahrain Riffa Club
1st Title
