= 1962–63 Bahraini Premier League =

Bahraini Premier League
- Season: 1962–63

Statistics of Bahraini Premier League in the 1962–63 season.

== Overview ==
Muharraq Club won the championship.
