= 1970–71 Bahraini Premier League =

Bahraini Premier League
- Season: 1970–71

Statistics of Bahraini Premier League in the 1970–71 season.

== Overview ==
Muharraq Club won the championship.
