= Yasser Akra =

Syrian footballer (born 1985)

Yasser Akra ياسر عكرة
Personal information
- Full name: Ali Yasser Akra
- Date of birth: 2 January 1985 (age 41)
- Place of birth: Lattakia, Syria
- Height: 1.82 m (5 ft 11 1/2 in)
- Position: Midfielder

Team information
- Current team: Bahrain SC

Senior career*
Years	Team	Apps	(Gls)
2004–2008	Hutteen		
2008–2012	Al-Jaish		
2012–2013	Al-Baqa'a		
2013–	Bahrain SC		
- * Club domestic league appearances and goals as of 22 January 2013 ‡ National team caps and goals as of 22 January 2013

Ali Yasser Akra (Arabic: علي ياسر عكرة; born 2 January 1985) is a Syrian professional footballer, who plays as a midfielder. As of 2021, he plays for Bahrain SC.
