= 1959–60 Bahraini Premier League =

Bahraini Premier League
- Season: 1959–60

Statistics of Bahraini Premier League in the 1959–60 season.

== Overview ==
Muharraq Club won the championship.
