= 1965–66 Bahraini Premier League =

Bahraini Premier League
- Season: 1965–66

Statistics of Bahraini Premier League in the 1965–66 season.

== Overview ==
Muharraq Club won the championship.
