= 1987–88 Bahraini Premier League =

Bahraini Premier League
- Season: 1987–88

Statistics of Bahraini Premier League for the 1987–88 season.

== Overview ==
Muharraq Club won the championship.
