= 1985–86 Bahraini Premier League =

Bahraini Premier League
- Season: 1985–86

In the 1985–86 Bahraini Premier League, Muharraq Club won the championship.
