= 1986–87 Bahraini Premier League =

Bahraini Premier League
- Season: 1986–87

Statistics of Bahraini Premier League for the 1986–87 season.

== Overview ==
Bahrain Riffa Club won the championship.
