= 1991–92 Bahraini Premier League =

Bahraini Premier League
- Season: 1991–92

Statistics of Bahraini Premier League for the 1991–92 season.

== Overview ==
Muharraq Club won the championship.
