= 1972–73 Bahraini Premier League =

Bahraini Premier League
- Season: 1972–73

Statistics of Bahraini Premier League in the 1972–73 season.

== Overview ==
Muharraq Club won the championship.
