= 1990–91 Bahraini Premier League =

Bahraini Premier League
- Season: 1990/1991
- Champions: Muharraq Club

Statistics of Bahraini Premier League for the 1990–91 season.

== Overview ==
Muharraq Club won the championship.
