= Júlio Vaz =

Brazilian footballer

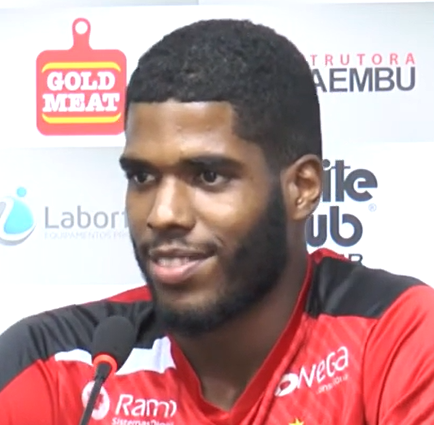
- Júlio Vaz in 2017

Personal information
- Full name: Júlio César Vaz de Andrade
- Date of birth: 28 July 1997 (age 29)
- Place of birth: Capivari, Brazil
- Height: 1.87 m (6 ft 2 in)
- Position: Centre-back

Team information
- Current team: Botafogo-PB
- Number: 33

Youth career
- Guarani
- 2017: Botafogo-SP

Senior career*
Years	Team	Apps	(Gls)
2017–2018	Botafogo-SP	1	(0)
2018	VOCEM	7	(0)
2019	Manama		
2021–2023	São Joseense	12	(0)
2023	Paraná	4	(0)
2023	Comercial-SP	0	(0)
2024–2025	Velo Clube	22	(5)
2024	→ Água Santa (loan)	11	(0)
2025	Floresta	19	(1)
2026–	Botafogo-PB	10	(0)
- * Club domestic league appearances and goals as of 8 November 2026

Júlio César Vaz de Andrade (born 28 July 1997) is a Brazilian professional footballer who plays as a centre-back for Botafogo-PB.

== Career ==
Born in Capivari, São Paulo, Vaz represented Guarani and Botafogo-SP as a youth. He only featured in one first team match with the latter in 2017, before moving to VOCEM in the following year.

In 2019, Vaz moved abroad for the first time in his career, joining Manama in Bahrain. Back to his home country in the following year, he spent the entire 2020 season without a club before signing for São Joseense in July 2021.

On 23 March 2023, Vaz was presented at Paraná. On 3 July, he was announced at Campinense, but the deal later collapsed and he moved to Comercial-SP fifteen days later.

Vaz joined Velo Clube in November 2023, and scored five goals during the 2024 Campeonato Paulista Série A2 as the club achieved promotion as champions. On 27 April 2024, he moved to Água Santa on loan.

Back to Velo for the 2025 Campeonato Paulista, Vaz was initially ruled out of the competition after having a knee surgery, but recovered ahead of schedule.

== Career statistics ==
As of 5 February 2025

Club	Season	League			State League		Cup		Continental		Other		Total	
Club	Season	Division	Apps	Goals	Apps	Goals	Apps	Goals	Apps	Goals	Apps	Goals	Apps	Goals
Botafogo-SP	2017	Série C	1	0	—		—		—		—		1	0
Botafogo-SP	2018	Série C	0	0	0	0	—		—		—		0	0
Botafogo-SP	Total		1	0	0	0	—		—		—		1	0
VOCEM	2018	Paulista 2ª Divisão	—		7	0	—		—		—		7	0
São Joseense	2021	Paranaense Série Prata	—		5	0	—		—		—		5	0
São Joseense	2022	Paranaense	—		2	0	—		—		—		2	0
São Joseense	2023	Série D	0	0	5	0	—		—		—		5	0
São Joseense	Total		0	0	12	0	—		—		—		12	0
Paraná	2023	Paranaense Série Prata	—		4	0	—		—		—		4	0
Comercial-SP	2023	Paulista A2	—		—		—		—		7 (Note: Appearance(s) in Copa Paulista)	0	7	0
Velo Clube	2024	Paulista A2	—		18	5	—		—		—		18	5
Velo Clube	2025	Paulista	—		3	0	—		—		—		3	0
Velo Clube	Total		—		21	5	—		—		—		21	5
Água Santa (loan)	2024	Série D	11	0	—		—		—		—		11	0
Career total			12	0	44	5	0	0	0	0	7	0	63	5

== Honours ==
São Joseense

- Campeonato Paranaense Série Prata: 2021

Velo Clube

- Campeonato Paulista Série A2: 2024
