= João Luiz (footballer, born 1985) =

Brazilian footballer

Personal information
- Full name: João Luiz Ramires Vieira
- Date of birth: December 20, 1985 (age 40)
- Place of birth: Brazil
- Height: 1.82 m (6 ft 0 in)
- Position: Defensive midfielder

Senior career*
| Years | Team | Apps | (Gls) |
| 2007 | Rio Branco (SP) | – | (-) |
| 2007–2014 | Marítimo | 65 | (1) |
| 2010–2011 | → Beira Mar (loan) | 24 | (0) |
| 2014–2015 | Adanaspor | 14 | (1) |
| 2015 | Al Riffa | 6 | (-) |
- * Club domestic league appearances and goals as of February 5, 2009

João Luiz Ramires Vieira, known as João Luiz (born December 20, 1985, in Brazil), is a footballer playing as a midfielder.

He made his debut for Marítimo on December 23, 2007, in a 2–1 away victory against União Leiria. His first and so far only goal for the club came in a 4–1 defeat of Sporting Braga at home on April 19, 2008.
