= Bahraini Premier League =

Association football league in the Kingdom of Bahrain

- Founded: 1956; 70 years ago
- Country: Bahrain
- Confederation: AFC
- Number of clubs: 12
- Level on pyramid: 1
- Relegation to: Bahraini Second Division
- Domestic cup(s): King's Cup; Khalid Bin Hamad Cup; Super Cup
- League cup: FA Cup
- International cup: AFC Champions League Two
- Current champions: Al-Muharraq (36th title) (2025–26)
- Most championships: Al-Muharraq SC (36 titles)
- Top scorer: Ismail Abdullatif (124)
- Broadcaster: Bahrain Sports TV
- Current: 2025–26 Bahraini Premier League

The Bahraini Premier League is the main domestic football competition in the kingdom of Bahrain. Currently known as the Nasser bin Hamad Premier League, the first season was held in 1956–1957. The winners of the domestic championship qualify for the AFC Champions League Two. The championship is currently contested by 12 clubs.

== Structure ==
=== Current structure ===
12 clubs currently play a two round robin set of fixtures totaling 22 games in order to determine the league champions. Although games are theoretically to be played on a home and away basis, almost all games are played at the National Stadium.

The eleventh and twelfth-placed clubs are relegated with the ninth and tenth entering the relegation play-offs.

=== Previous structures ===
In earlier seasons, the league has been radically overhauled to feature all the professional clubs of Bahrain. Instances being the 2008–09 and 2002 league seasons. The leagues featuring up to 19 teams would play each other on one occasion with the top 10 teams staying in the Premier League top flight and the bottom sides (from 11 to 19) forming the next seasons Second Division.

Between the seasons of 2002 and 2009, the top four sides of the league would also play in the Crown Prince Cup.

== Clubs (2025–26) ==
- A'Ali
- Al-Ahli
- Al-Budaiya
- Al-Hidd
- Al-Khaldiya
- Al-Muharraq
- Al-Najma
- Al-Riffa
- Al-Shabab
- Bahrain SC
- Malkiya
- Sitra

== Team re-structuring ==
In 2002, a host of clubs were amalgamated:

- Bahrain is an amalgamation of Bahrain and Al-Khaleej.
- Riffa is an amalgamation of West Riffa and Zallaq.
- Al-Najma is an amalgamation of Al-Hilal, Al-Qadisiya and Ras Al-Rumman.
- Al-Sahel is an amalgamation of Qalali and Hadd.
- Al-Tadamun is an amalgamation of Boori, Karazkan, Hamla, Reef Union and Damastan.
- Al-Shabab is an amalgamation of Deyya, Sanabis, Jadd Hafs, Naeem, Karrana, Sahla and Karbabad.
- Al-Ittifaq is an amalgamation of Al-Arabi, Maqaba and Bani Jumra.

== List of champions ==
Champions are:

Years	Champions
1956–57	Al Muharraq Club (1)
1957–58	Al Muharraq Club (2)
1958–59	Al-Nasr SC (1)
1959–60	Al Muharraq Club (3)
1960–61	Al Muharraq Club (4)
1961–62	Al Muharraq Club (5)
1962–63	Al Muharraq Club (6)
1963–64	Al Muharraq Club (7)
1964–65	Al Muharraq Club (8)
1965–66	Al Muharraq Club (9)
1966–67	Al Muharraq Club (10)
1967–68	Bahrain Club (1)
1968–69	Al-Ahli Club (1)
1969–70	Al Muharraq Club (11)
1970–71	Al Muharraq Club (12)
1971–72	Al-Ahli Club (2)
1972–73	Al Muharraq Club (13)
1973–74	Al Muharraq Club (14)
1974–75	Al Arabi (1)
1975–76	Al Muharraq Club (15)
1976–77	Al-Ahli Club (3)
1977–78	Bahrain Club (2)
1978–79	Al Hala SC (1)
1979–80	Al Muharraq Club (16)
1980–81	Bahrain Club (3)
1981–82	Al-Riffa (1)
1982–83	Al Muharraq Club (17)
1983–84	Al Muharraq Club (18)
1984–85	Bahrain Club (4)
1985–86	Al Muharraq Club (19)
1986–87	Al-Riffa (2)
1987–88	Al Muharraq Club (20)
1988–89	Bahrain Club (5)
1989–90	Al-Riffa (3)
1990–91	Al Muharraq Club (21)
1991–92	Al Muharraq Club (22)
1992–93	Al-Riffa (4)
1993–94	East Riffa (1)
1994–95	Al Muharraq Club (23)
1995–96	Al-Ahli Club (4)
1996–97	Al-Riffa (5)
1997–98	Al-Riffa (6)
1998–99	Al Muharraq Club (24)
1999–2000	Al-Riffa (7)
2000–01	Al Muharraq Club (25)
2002	Al Muharraq Club (26)
2002-03	Al-Riffa (8)
2003-04	Al Muharraq Club (27)
2004-05	Al-Riffa (9)
2005–06	Al Muharraq Club (28)
2006–07	Al Muharraq Club (29)
2007–08	Al Muharraq Club (30)
2008–09	Al Muharraq Club (31)
2009–10	Al-Ahli Club (5)
2010–11	Al Muharraq Club (32)
2011–12	Al-Riffa (10)
2012–13	Busaiteen Club (1)
2013–14	Al-Riffa (11)
2014–15	Al Muharraq Club (33)
2015–16	Al Hidd SCC (1)
2016–17	Malkiya Club (1)
2017–18	Al Muharraq Club (34)
2018–19	Al-Riffa (12)
2019–20	Al Hidd SCC (2)
2020–21	Al-Riffa (13)
2021–22	Al-Riffa (14)
2022–23	Al-Khaldiya SC (1)
2023–24	Al-Khaldiya SC (2)
2024–25	Al Muharraq Club (35)
2025–26	Al Muharraq Club (36)

== Total championships ==
The number of national championships that clubs in Bahrain have attained.

Club	Number of Championships
Al-Muharraq SC	36
Al-Riffa (includes West Riffa)	14
Bahrain SC	5
Al-Ahli SC	5
Al-Hidd	2
Al-Khaldiya	2
Al-Nasr	1
Al-Arabi (Al-Najma SC now)	1
Al Hala	1
East Riffa SCC	1
Busaiteen	1
Malkiya SCC	1

== Top scorers ==
Year		Best scorers	Team	Goals
2003–04	(Bahrain)	Duaij Naser Abdulla; Yousif Zowaid	Al-Muharraq	14
2004–05	(Bahrain)	Salman Isa	Al-Riffa	15
2005–06	(Bahrain)	Jaycee John Okwunwanne	Al-Ahli	17
2006–07	(Brazil)	Rico	Al-Riffa	25
2007–08	(Bahrain)	Jaycee John Okwunwanne	Al-Muharraq	24
2008–09	(Bahrain)	Abdulrahman Mubarak	Al-Riffa	14
2009–10	(Brazil)	Rico	Al-Muharraq	17
2010–11	(Brazil) (Bahrain)	Diego Silva; Abdulrahman Mubarak	Al-Ahli; Al-Riffa	13
2011–12	(Bahrain)	Ahmed Al Khattal	Al Hala	14
2012–13	(Saudi Arabia)	Mohammed Al Shamrani	Manama	10
2013–14	(Bahrain)	Pele	Al-Muharraq	4
2014–15	(Bahrain)	Ismail Abdullatif	Al-Muharraq	16
2015–16	(Bahrain)	Mohamed Al-Romaihi	Al-Hidd	17
2016–17	(Brazil)	Everton	Manama Club	11
2017–18	(Nigeria)	Uche	Al Najma Club	18
2018–19	(Senegal)	Mahamadou Dramé	Al Najma Club	14
2019–20	(Bahrain)	Kamil Al Aswad	Al-Riffa	14
2020–21	(Bahrain)	Mahdi Abduljabbar	Manama Club	12
2021–22	(Bahrain)	Mahdi Abduljabbar	Manama Club	17
2022–23	(Bahrain)	Mahdi Al-Humaidan	Al-Khaldiya	14
2023–24	(Brazil)	Juninho	Al-Najma	20
2024–25	(Brazil)	Juninho	Al-Muharraq	15
2025–26	(Democratic Republic of the Congo)	Joel Beya	Al Khaldiya	13
