= Halat Bu Maher =

Halat Bu Maher حالة بو ماهر
- Neighborhood
- Location in Bahrain
- Coordinates: 26°14′46″N 50°36′54″E
- Country: Bahrain
- Governorate: Muharraq Governorate

Halat Bu Maher (Arabic: حالة بو ماهر), sometimes abbreviated to simply "Al Hala" (Arabic: الحالة), is a neighbourhood of Muharraq, Bahrain. It used to be a separate island, but after coastal expansion via land reclamation and dredging, the island has merged with Muharraq Island, and the former settlement integrated as a neighbourhood of Muharraq city.

Located at the southern tip of Muharraq city, the neighborhood is home to the historic Bu Maher Fort, which is part of the UNESCO-listed Bahrain Pearling Trail. The Al Hala Club football team is based here.

In the early 20th century, Halat Bu Maher was used as a quarantine camp for arrivals to Bahrain by sea or air.
