= Al-Muharraq SC =

Al-Muharraq
- Full name: Al-Muharraq Sports Club
- Nicknames: الذئب الأحمر (The red wolf)
- Short name: Muharraq
- Founded: 1928; 98 years ago
- Ground: Al Muharraq Stadium
- Capacity: 10,000
- Chairman: Rashid bin Hamad Al-Khalifa
- Head coach: Isa Alsadoon
- League: Premier League
- 2025–26: Bahraini Premier League, 1st of 12 (Champions)
Home colours	Away colours

Al-Muharraq Sports Club is a professional football club based in Muharraq, Bahrain. Founded in 1928, it is one of the oldest and most successful football clubs in Bahrain. The club has won numerous domestic and regional titles, including 36 Bahraini Premier League titles and 1 GCC Champions League title. Al-Muharraq Sports Club is known for its passionate fanbase and its rivalry with Al-Ahli Club, which is considered one of the biggest in Bahraini football.

== History ==
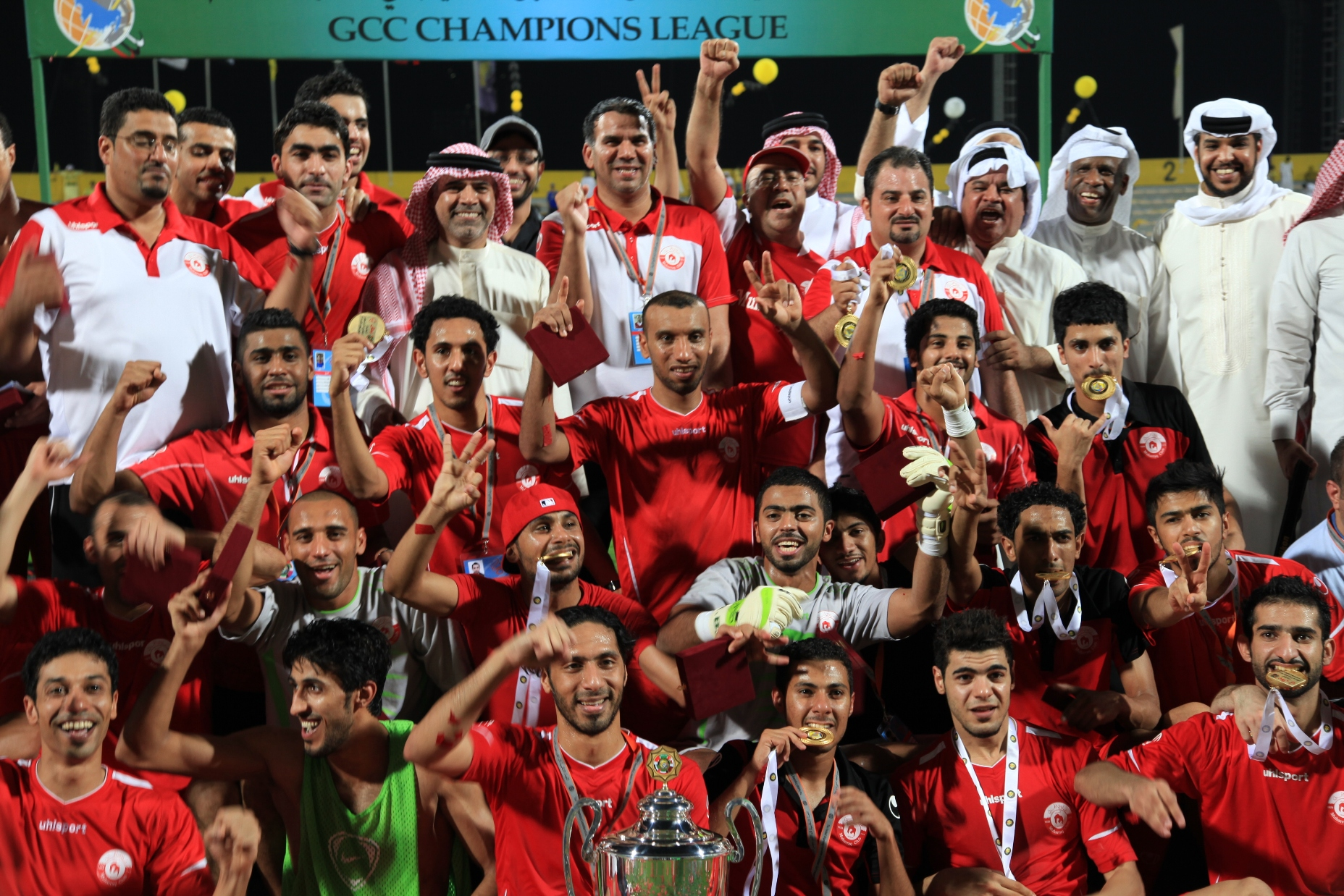
Al Muharraq after being crowned champions of the GCC Champions League

Al-Muharraq was first founded in 1928. Al-Muharraq Sports Club have produced some of the current stars of the national team like the captain Mohamed Salmeen, Rashid Al Dossary, Alisa, veteran goalkeeper Ali Hassan, Ali Amer and Ebrahim Al Mishkhas.

Al-Muharraq Sports Club's youth academy has produced players like Abdullah Al Dekheel, Mahmood Abdulrahman, Fahad Showaiter, Hussam Humood Sultan, and Abdullah Al-Kaabi.

Al-Muharraq Sports Club has brought in foreign professionals on certain occasions such as Brazilian forward Leandson Dias da Silva also known as Rico and Adnan Sarajlic, defender Juliano de Paola, and Jamal Ebraro . Rico won the world's top scorer award in 2008 with 19 goals scored. Jordanian Midfielders Noor Al-Rawabdeh and Mahmoud Al-Mardi who they help Al-Muharraq to win the 2021 AFC Cup.

2008 was a perfect season for Al-Muharraq Sports Club as they completed a quadruple (Bahraini League, King's Cup, Crown Prince Cup and the AFC Cup). Al-Muharraq Sports Club became the first Bahraini club to win a continental championship.

On 10 June 2012 Muharraq won the GCC Champions League for the first time.

Al-Muharraq won the AFC Cup two times in 2021 and in 2008.

== Honours ==
Football First Team Official Honours

=== Domestic ===
- Bahraini Premier League
  - Winners (36): 1956–57, 1957–58, 1959–60, 1960–61, 1961–62, 1962–63, 1963–64, 1964–65, 1965–66, 1966–67, 1969–70, 1970–71, 1972–73, 1973–74, 1975–76, 1979–80, 1982–83, 1983–84, 1985–86, 1987–88, 1990–91, 1991–92, 1994–95, 1998–99, 2000–01, 2001–02, 2003–04, 2005–06, 2006–07, 2007–08, 2008–09, 2010–11, 2014–15, 2017–18, 2024–25, 2025–26
- Bahraini King's Cup
  - Winners (34): 1952, 1953, 1954, 1958, 1959, 1961, 1962, 1963, 1964, 1966, 1967, 1972, 1974, 1975, 1978, 1979, 1983, 1984, 1989, 1990, 1993, 1995, 1996, 1997, 2002, 2005, 2008, 2009, 2011, 2012, 2013, 2015–16, 2019–20, 2025–26
- Bahraini FA Cup
  - Winners (5): 2005, 2009, 2020, 2021, 2022
- Bahraini Crown Prince Cup
  - Winners (5): 2001, 2006, 2007, 2008, 2009
- Bahraini Super Cup
  - Winners (4): 1995, 2006, 2013, 2018
- Bahraini Elite Cup
  - Winners (1): 2019

=== Regional ===
- GCC Champions League
  - Winners (1): 2012

=== Continental ===
- AFC Champions League Two
  - Winners (2): 2008, 2021

== Players ==
=== First-team squad ===
As of the 2026-27 season.

Note: Flags indicate national team as defined under FIFA eligibility rules; some limited exceptions apply. Players may hold more than one non-FIFA nationality.

No.	Pos.	Nation	Player
1	GK	SRB	Vladan Đekić
2	DF	BHR	Husain Jameel
3	DF	BHR	Waleed Al Hayam
5	DF	BHR	Amine Benaddi
6	MF	VEN	Bryant Ortega
7	FW	BHR	Ahmed Al-Sherooqi
8	MF	BHR	Mohamed Al-Hardan
9	FW	ARG	Facundo Tobares
10	MF	BHR	Abdulwahab Al-Malood
11	FW	MAR	Soufian Mahrouq
15	MF	GHA	Abdulwahab Hanan
17	DF	BHR	Ahmad Rabeea
18	FW	BHR	Hussain Abdulkarim
20	FW	BHR	Abdoul Karim Diarra
21	GK	BHR	Sayed Mohammed Jaffer
22	GK	BHR	Ebrahim Lutfalla (on loan at Al Ahli)

No.	Pos.	Nation	Player
24	GK	BHR	Ashraf Waheed
25	DF	BHR	Hasan Al-Karrani
26	DF	URU	Gervasio Olivera
27	DF	BHR	Mohamed Al-Banna
29	MF	BRA	Anderson Leite
31	DF	BRA	Bruno Santos
32	DF	BHR	Abdulla Al-Khulasi
37	FW	BRA	Juninho
50	FW	BHR	Abdulla Jamal
73	DF	BHR	Ahmed Bughammar
80	MF	BRA	Arthur Rezende
99	FW	ANG	Elliot Simões
96	MF	BIH	Rijad Kobiljar

== Managerial history ==
- (Brazil) Ralf Borges Ferreira (1989–90)
- (Tunisia) Lotfi Benzarti (1990–91)
- (Brazil) David Ferreira "Duque" (1991–92)
- (Tunisia) Lotfi Benzarti (1994–95)
- (Romania) Ion Moldovan (1999)
- (Romania) Ion Ion (1999–00)
- (Brazil) Acácio Casimiro (2003)
- (Brazil) Ralf Borges Ferreira (2003–04)
- (Brazil) Stefano Impagliazzo (2004–05)
- (Bahrain) Khalifa Al-Zayani (2005)
- (Portugal) Carlos Alhinho (2005–06)
- (Bahrain) Khalifa Al-Zayani (2006)
- (Brazil) Fernando Dourado (2006)
- (Bahrain) Salman Sharida (2007–08)
- (Brazil) Julio Peixoto
- (Bosnia and Herzegovina) Dino Đurbuzović (2014–2015)
- (Croatia) Rodion Gačanin (2016)
- (Germany) Robert Jaspert (2017)
- (Bahrain) Salman Sharida (2018)
- (Tunisia) Nacif Beyaoui (2018)
- (Tunisia) Nabil Kouki (2018–2019)
- (Bahrain) Ali Amer (2019)
- (Brazil) Lucas Paqueta (2019–2020)
- (Bahrain) Isa Sadoon Al-Hamdani (2020–2023)

== Basketball section ==
Al-Muharraq also has a basketball section that plays in the Bahraini Premier League. The team has won five national championships, in 2008, 2012 , 2019 , 2025 and 2026.

In 2023–24, Muharraq will play in the West Asia Super League (WASL), becoming the second Bahraini team to do so.
