= East Riffa Club =

East Riffa SCC
- Full name: East Riffa Sports and Cultural Club
- Founded: 1958; 68 years ago
- Ground: Bahrain National Stadium
- Capacity: 24,000
- Manager: Florin Motroc
- League: Premier League
- 2023–24: Premier League, 10th of 12
Home colours	Away colours

East Riffa Club (Arabic: نادي الرفاع الشرقي) is a Bahraini professional football club based in Riffa, Bahrain. Founded in 1956, the club plays in Bahraini Premier League, the top division of Bahraini football.

== Current squad ==
=== First-team squad ===
As of 12 February 2024

Note: Flags indicate national team as defined under FIFA eligibility rules; some limited exceptions apply. Players may hold more than one non-FIFA nationality.

No.	Pos.	Nation	Player
1	DF	BHR	Mahmood Al-Ajmi
2	MF	BHR	Saud Al-Asam
4	DF	BHR	Sayed Baqer
5	MF	SYR	Mouhamad Anez
6	DF	BHR	Ali Faraj
7	FW	BHR	Abdulaziz Khalid
8	MF	BRA	Vinícius Vargas
10	MF	BHR	Kamil Al-Aswad
11	MF	JOR	Majdi Al-Attar
12	DF	SRB	Lazar Đorđević
14	MF	BHR	Ali Haram
15	DF	BHR	Hamad Al-Shamsan
16	DF	BHR	Sayed Redha Isa

No.	Pos.	Nation	Player
17	FW	BHR	Hashim Sayed Isa
18	FW	BHR	Ali Hasan Isa
19	DF	BHR	Husein Al–Eker
21	MF	BHR	Yassine Benmansour
22	MF	BHR	Fahad Jassim
23	FW	TUN	Aymen Harzi
24	GK	BHR	Kareem Fardan
25	MF	BHR	Mohammed Qayoom
28	DF	BHR	Hazza Ali
29	GK	BHR	Abdullah Al-Ahmad
36	MF	BHR	Saleh Mohamed
39	FW	BRA	Jacó
40	GK	CRO	Marin Ljubić

== Achievements ==
Football

- Bahraini Premier League: 1

1994.

- Bahraini Second Division League: 1

2014.

- Bahraini King's Cup: 3

1999, 2000, 2014.

- Bahraini FA Cup: 1

2019.

- Bahraini Super Cup: 1

2014.

== Managerial history ==
- (Brazil) Julio Peixoto
- (England) Steve Darby (1979)
- (Croatia) Miloš Hrstić (1995–97)
- (Croatia) Vjeran Simunic (1998–99)
- (Croatia) Miloš Hrstić (2004–05)
- (Croatia) Dragan Talajić (2006–07)
- (Bosnia and Herzegovina) Senad Kreso (2011–12)
- (Bosnia and Herzegovina) Džemal Hadžiabdić (2012–13)
- (Serbia) Davor Berber (2013–15)
- (Spain) Hisham Zahid (2016)
- (Spain) Pedro Gómez Carmona (2018–19)
- (Romania) Florin Motroc (2020–22)
- (Syria) Ghassan Maatouk (2022)
- (Jordan) Ibrahim Helmi (2023)
- (Bahrain) Ismaeel Karami (2023–24)
- (Tunisia) Fethi Laabidi (2024–25)
- (Romania) Florin Motroc (2025–present)
