= Bahrain SC =

- Full name: Bahrain Sports Club
- Nickname: The National Club
- Founded: 1936; 90 years ago
- Ground: Al Muharraq Stadium; Muharraq, Bahrain
- Capacity: 20,000
- League: Premier League
- 2023–24: Second Division, 1st of 12 (promoted)
Home colours	Away colours

Al-Bahrain Sports Club (Arabic: نادي البحرين الرياضي), simply known as Bahrain, is a Bahraini multi-sports club best known for its football section, based in the island-governorate of Al-Muharraq. Their home stadium is Al Muharraq Stadium, which they share with local rivals Al-Muharraq Sports Club. Bahrain Club also has teams for other sports, such as basketball, handball and volleyball.

== Achievements ==
- Bahraini Premier League: 5
  - Winners (5): 1968, 1978, 1981, 1985, 1989
- Bahraini King's Cup: 2
  - Winners (2): 1970, 1971
- Bahraini Second Division: 1
  - Winners (1): 2011

== Performance in AFC competitions ==
- Asian Club Championship: 1

1991: Cancelled

- Asian Cup Winners Cup: 1

1998 – 1st round
