= 2025–26 Al-Shabab FC season =

Al-Shabab
2025–26 season
- President: Kholaif Al-Howaishan
- Manager: Imanol Alguacil (until 17 February); Noureddine Zekri (from 17 February)
- Stadium: Al-Shabab Club Stadium
- Pro League: 13th
- King's Cup: Quarter-finals
- Gulf Club Champions League: Runners-up
- All statistics correct as of 23 April 2026.

The 2025–26 season is Al-Shabab's 49th non-consecutive season in the top flight of Saudi football and 79th year in existence as a football club. In addition to the Pro League, the club also participated in the King's Cup and the Gulf Club Champions League.

The season covers the period from 1 July 2025 to 30 June 2026.

== Players ==
=== Squad information ===
As of 10 September 2025

Note: Flags indicate national team as defined under FIFA eligibility rules; some limited exceptions apply. Players may hold more than one non-FIFA nationality.

No.	Pos.	Nation	Player
2	DF	KSA	Mohammed Al-Shuwayrikh
4	DF	NED	Wesley Hoedt
5	DF	KSA	Ali Makki
6	MF	KSA	Faisal Al-Subiani
7	MF	ESP	Unai Hernández (on loan from Al-Ittihad)
8	MF	ENG	Josh Brownhill
9	FW	MAR	Abderrazak Hamdallah
10	MF	BEL	Yannick Carrasco (captain)
13	FW	BRA	Carlos Junior
14	MF	SUI	Vincent Sierro
16	DF	KSA	Hussain Al-Sibyani
19	FW	KSA	Majed Abdullah
21	MF	KSA	Nawaf Al-Sadi
22	MF	KSA	Hammam Al-Hammami
23	GK	KSA	Abdulaziz Al-Awairdhi
29	MF	FRA	Yacine Adli
31	DF	KSA	Saad Balobaid (on loan from Al-Ahli)
33	GK	KSA	Mohammed Al-Mahasneh
34	DF	KSA	Sultan Al-Anize

No.	Pos.	Nation	Player
36	DF	KSA	Adel Al-Mutairi
37	FW	KSA	Abdullah Matuq
38	DF	KSA	Mohammed Harbush
44	DF	KSA	Awaji Olwani
45	DF	KSA	Amjad Haraj
46	MF	KSA	Emad Qaysi
55	GK	KSA	Mishal Al-Mutieb
66	DF	KSA	Nawaf Al-Ghulaimish
71	MF	KSA	Abdulelah Daghar
72	MF	KSA	Nasser Al-Sadi
77	FW	KSA	Hisham Al Dubais
94	DF	KSA	Mubarak Al-Rajeh
—	GK	BRA	Marcelo Grohe
—	FW	KSA	Hamad Al-Khurayef

=== Out on loan ===
Note: Flags indicate national team as defined under FIFA eligibility rules; some limited exceptions apply. Players may hold more than one non-FIFA nationality.

No. / Pos. / Nation / Player; 1 / GK / UKR / Heorhiy Bushchan (on loan to Polissya Zhytomyr)	No. / Pos. / Nation / Player; 56 / MF / POR / Daniel Podence (on loan to Olympiacos)

== Transfers and loans ==
=== Transfers in ===
Entry date	Position	No.	Player	From club	Fee	Ref.
30 June 2025	DF	34	(Saudi Arabia) Sultan Al-Enezi	(Saudi Arabia) Al-Kawkab	End of loan	
30 June 2025	MF	37	(Saudi Arabia) Abdullah Matuq	(Saudi Arabia) Al-Jandal	End of loan	
30 June 2025	FW	13	(Brazil) Carlos	(Saudi Arabia) Neom	End of loan	
30 June 2025	FW	20	(Senegal) Habib Diallo	(Saudi Arabia) Damac	End of loan	
5 July 2025	FW	9	(Morocco) Abderrazak Hamdallah	(Saudi Arabia) Al-Hilal	End of loan	
18 August 2025	DF	94	(Saudi Arabia) Mubarak Al-Rajeh	(Saudi Arabia) Al-Raed	$400,000	
19 August 2025	DF	5	(Saudi Arabia) Ali Makki	(Saudi Arabia) Al-Wehda	$1,600,000	
19 August 2025	MF	14	(Switzerland) Vincent Sierro	(France) Toulouse	$3,500,000	
20 August 2025	GK	23	(Saudi Arabia) Abdulaziz Al-Awairdhi	(Saudi Arabia) Al-Riyadh	Free	
20 August 2025	GK	–	(Saudi Arabia) Mohammed Al-Mahasneh	(Saudi Arabia) Al-Shabab	Free	
20 August 2025	MF	6	(Saudi Arabia) Faisal Al-Subiani	(Saudi Arabia) Al-Ahli	Free	
28 August 2025	MF	22	(Saudi Arabia) Hammam Al-Hammami	(Saudi Arabia) Al-Ittihad	Swap	
9 September 2025	GK	43	(Brazil) Marcelo Grohe	(Saudi Arabia) Al-Kholood	Free	
10 September 2025	MF	29	(France) Yacine Adli	(Italy) AC Milan	$9,380,000	
10 September 2025	MF	8	(England) Josh Brownhill	(England) Burnley	Free	
14 January 2026	DF	17	(Saudi Arabia) Mohammed Al-Thani	(Saudi Arabia) Al-Qadsiah	$2,133,000	
20 January 2026	MF	20	(Saudi Arabia) Basil Al-Sayyali	(Saudi Arabia) Al-Hazem	Undisclosed	

=== Loans in ===
Start date	End date	Position	No.	Player	From club	Fee	Ref.
9 September 2025	End of season	MF	7	(Spain) Unai Hernández	(Saudi Arabia) Al-Ittihad	None	
10 September 2025	End of season	DF	31	(Saudi Arabia) Saad Balobaid	(Saudi Arabia) Al-Ahli	None	
11 September 2025	End of season	FW	91	(Saudi Arabia) Abdulaziz Al-Othman	(Saudi Arabia) Al-Qadsiah	None	
27 January 2026	End of season	MF	–	(Saudi Arabia) Ali Al-Asmari	(Saudi Arabia) Neom	None	
27 January 2026	End of season	FW	–	(Jordan) Ali Azaizeh	(Kuwait) Kazma	$250,000	

=== Transfers out ===
Exit date	Position	No.	Player	To club	Fee	Ref.
30 June 2025	DF	3	(Brazil) Leandrinho	(Brazil) Vasco da Gama	End of loan	
30 June 2025	DF	30	(Brazil) Robert Renan	(Russia) Zenit	End of loan	
30 June 2025	DF	71	(Saudi Arabia) Mohammed Al-Thani	(Saudi Arabia) Al-Hazem	End of loan	
30 June 2025	MF	14	(Finland) Glen Kamara	(France) Stade Rennais	End of loan	
30 June 2025	MF	15	(Saudi Arabia) Musab Al-Juwayr	(Saudi Arabia) Al-Hilal	End of loan	
30 June 2025	MF	17	(Saudi Arabia) Younes Al-Shanqiti	(Saudi Arabia) Al-Ahli	End of loan	
1 July 2025	GK	18	(South Korea) Kim Seung-gyu	(Japan) FC Tokyo	Free	
10 July 2025	MF	12	(Saudi Arabia) Majed Kanabah	(Saudi Arabia) Al-Khaleej	Free	
16 July 2025	DF	5	(Saudi Arabia) Nader Al-Sharari	(Saudi Arabia) Al-Nassr	Free	
19 July 2025	MF	11	(Argentina) Cristian Guanca	(Saudi Arabia) Al-Ula	Free	
13 August 2025	GK	50	(Saudi Arabia) Mohammed Al-Absi	(Saudi Arabia) Al-Ittihad	Swap	
31 August 2025	FW	20	(Senegal) Habib Diallo	(France) Metz	Free	
6 September 2025	FW	70	(Saudi Arabia) Haroune Camara	(Saudi Arabia) Al-Nassr	$4,000,000	

=== Loans out ===
Start date	End date	Position	No.	Player	To club	Fee	Ref.
1 September 2025	End of season	MF	56	(Portugal) Daniel Podence	(Greece) Olympiacos	None	
6 September 2025	End of season	GK	1	(Ukraine) Heorhiy Bushchan	(Ukraine) Polissya Zhytomyr	None	
10 September 2025	End of season	FW	77	(Saudi Arabia) Hisham Al Dubais	(Saudi Arabia) Al-Najma	None	

== Pre-season ==
28 July 2025 Friendly	Al-Shabab (Saudi Arabia)	0–3	(Qatar) Al-Gharafa	Austria
16:00 CEST		Report	Díaz; Traoré; Djaló

3 August 2025 Friendly	Al-Shabab (Saudi Arabia)	0–0	(United Arab Emirates) Sharjah	Austria
17:00 CEST

6 August 2025 Friendly	Al-Shabab (Saudi Arabia)	0–0	(Qatar) Al-Shahaniya	Mattersburg, Austria
17:30 CEST		Report		Stadium: Pappelstadion

12 August 2025 Friendly	Al-Shabab (Saudi Arabia)	5–0	(Slovenia) Bistrica	Austria
12:00 CEST	Hamdallah, Carlos; Al Dubais; Abdullah	Report

21 August 2025 Friendly	Al-Shabab (Saudi Arabia)	2–2	(Saudi Arabia) Al-Riyadh	Riyadh, Saudi Arabia
19:25 AST	Hamdallah; Camara		Bayesh; Okou	Stadium: Al-Shabab Club Stadium

== Competitions ==
=== Overview ===
Competition	Record							
Competition	Pld	W	D	L	GF	GA	GD	Win %
Pro League	29	7	11	11	37	43	−6	24.14
King's Cup	3	1	1	1	4	6	−2	33.33
Gulf Club Champions League	8	1	5	2	19	11	+8	12.50
Total	40	9	17	14	60	60	+0	22.50

Updated to match played 29 April 2026
Source: Competitions

=== Pro League ===
==== League table ====
Pos	Team	Pld	W	D	L	GF	GA	GD	Pts
11	Al-Fateh	34	9	10	15	41	55	−14	37
12	Al-Khaleej	34	10	7	17	54	62	−8	37
13	Al-Shabab	34	8	11	15	44	57	−13	35
14	Al-Kholood	34	9	6	19	39	61	−22	33
15	Al-Riyadh	34	7	9	18	35	63	−28	30

Source: SPL
Rules for classification: 1) Points; 2) Head-to-head points; 3) Head-to-head goal difference; 4) Total goal difference; 5) Total goals scored; 6) Fair-play points
(Note: Head-to-head record is used only after all the matches between the teams in question have been played).

==== Results summary ====
Overall								Home						Away					
Pld	W	D	L	GF	GA	GD	Pts	W	D	L	GF	GA	GD	W	D	L	GF	GA	GD
18	3	7	8	18	25	−7	16	2	3	3	10	13	−3	1	4	5	8	12	−4

Last updated: 29 January 2026.
Source: Saudi Pro League

==== Results by round ====
Round	1	2	3	4	5	6	7	8	9	11	12	13	14	15	16	17	18	19	20	21	22	23	10	24	25	26	27	28	29	30	31	32	33	34
Ground	H	H	A	H	A	H	A	H	A	A	H	A	A	H	A	H	A	A	H	A	H	A	H	H	A	H	A	H	A	H	H	A	H	A
Result	L	W	D	L	D	D	L	D	D	L	L	L	L	W	L	D	D	W																
Position	17	11	11	12	13	12	14	13	13	13	15	15	16	14	14	14	14	13																

Updated to match(es) played on 30 January 2026. Source: Saudi Pro League
A = Away; H = Home; W = Win; D = Draw; L = Loss

==== Matches ====
All times are local, AST (UTC+3).

Win Draw Loss Postponed

29 August 2025 1	Al-Shabab	1–4	Al-Khaleej	Riyadh
21:00	Carrasco 59' (pen.), (yellow card) 66'	Report	King 5', 82'; Masouras (yellow card) 39'; Al-Khabrani (yellow card) 45'; Fortounis 53' (pen.); Al Hamsal (yellow card) 58'; Kourbelis (yellow card) 62'; Al-Amri 64'; Assiri (yellow card) 74'; Kanabah (yellow card) 90+5'	Stadium: Al-Shabab Club Stadium; Attendance: 2,894; Referee: Khalid Al-Turais

12 September 2025 2	Al-Shabab	1–0	Al-Hazem	Riyadh
18:35	Carrasco 64'; Al-Rajeh (yellow card) 70'; Hernández (yellow card) 86'	Report	Al-Nakhli (yellow card) 12' (yellow-red card) 32'; Al-Harbi (yellow card) 18'; Martins (yellow card) 42'	Stadium: Al-Shabab Club Stadium; Attendance: 3,647; Referee: Majed Al-Shamrani

19 September 2025 3	Al-Fayha	0–0	Al-Shabab	Al Majma'ah
18:35	Ganvoula (yellow card) 35'; Semedo (yellow card) 57'; Al-Baqawi (yellow card) 90+4'	Report	Hoedt (yellow card) 5'; Al-Shuwayrikh (yellow card) 64'	Stadium: Al-Majma'ah Sports City Stadium; Attendance: 733; Referee: Sami Al-Jires

25 September 2025 4	Al-Shabab	1–2	Al-Kholood	Riyadh
18:25	Hernández (yellow card) 14'; Carrasco 61' (pen.)	Report	Bahebri (yellow card) 20'; Enrique 48'; Al-Aliwa 90'	Stadium: SHG Arena; Attendance: 2,377; Referee: Mohammed Al-Hoaish

17 October 2025 5	Al-Ahli	1–1	Al-Shabab	Jeddah
21:00	Toney 15' (pen.); Majrashi (yellow card) 72'; Millot (yellow card) 90'	Report	Al-Shuwayrikh (red card) 77'; Brownhill 87'; Carrasco (yellow card) 90+1'	Stadium: Alinma Stadium; Attendance: 14,590; Referee: Nicolás Ramírez (Argentina)

25 October 2025 6	Al-Shabab	1–1	Damac	Riyadh
17:55	Carrasco 45+6' (pen.)	Report	Bedrane (red card) 45+2'; Hoedt 45+9' (o.g.); Medina (yellow card) 64'; Harkass (yellow card) 90+7'	Stadium: SHG Arena; Attendance: 2,521; Referee: Sultan Al-Harbi

31 October 2025 7	Al-Hilal	1–0	Al-Shabab	Riyadh
17:50	Leonardo 36'; Koulibaly (red card) 78'; N. Al-Dawsari (yellow card) 83'; Neves (yellow card) 90'	Report	Al-Othman (yellow card) 12'; Al-Subiani (yellow card) 73'; Hernández (yellow card) 90+1'	Stadium: Kingdom Arena; Attendance: 22,293; Referee: Georgi Kabakov (Bulgaria)

8 November 2025 8	Al-Shabab	1–1	Al-Ettifaq	Riyadh
17:45	Al-Othman 13', (yellow card) 61'; Al-Sibyani (yellow card) 24'; Al-Shuwayrikh (yellow card) 57'; Al-Subiani (yellow card) 82'; Matuq (yellow card) 82'	Report	Wijnaldum 86' (pen.)	Stadium: SHG Arena; Attendance: 1,895; Referee: Mohammed Al-Ismail

23 November 2025 9	Al-Okhdood	1–1	Al-Shabab	Najran
18:05	Narey 45+2'; Ashi (yellow card) 88'; Petros (yellow card) 90+10'	Report	Al-Sibyani (yellow card) 21'; Hamdallah 33', (yellow card) 80'	Stadium: Prince Hathloul bin Abdulaziz Sports City; Attendance: 2,851; Referee: Abdullah Al-Owaidan

27 December 2025 11	Al-Ittihad	2–0	Al-Shabab	Jeddah
20:30	A. Al-Ghamdi 16'; Mitaj (yellow card) 43'; Bergwijn 85'	Report	Abdullah (yellow card) 70'	Stadium: Alinma Stadium; Attendance: 15,871; Referee: Mohammed Al-Hoaish

31 December 2025 12	Al-Shabab	2–3	Al-Qadsiah	Riyadh
20:30	Hernández (yellow card) 30'; Matuq (yellow card) 39'; Hoedt (yellow card) 52'; Brownhill 61', (yellow card) 80'; Carrasco 90+2' (pen.)	Report	Retegui 12', (yellow card) 46'; Quiñones 31' (pen.); Nández 41'	Stadium: Prince Faisal bin Fahd Sports City Stadium; Attendance: 2,556; Referee: Sandro Schärer (Switzerland)

3 January 2026 13	Al-Fateh	2–0	Al-Shabab	Al-Hasa
16:10	Bendebka 11'; Batna (yellow card) 45+1'; Saâdane (yellow card) 45+2'; Baattiah (yellow card) 57'; Delgado (yellow card) 65'; Al-Zubaidi 90+5'	Report	H. Al-Sibyani (yellow card) 19'; F. Al-Subiani (yellow card) 27' (yellow-red card) 47'; Carrasco (yellow card) 56'; Makki (red card) 62'	Stadium: Maydan Tamweel Aloula; Attendance: 6,017; Referee: Ahmed Al-Rumaikhani

9 January 2026 14	Al-Taawoun	2–0	Al-Shabab	Buraidah
18:05	Martínez 27' (pen.); Fulgini 45+4'; Al-Mufarrij (yellow card) 82'	Report	Carlos (yellow card) 2'; Al-Shuwayrikh (red card) 18'; Hernández (yellow card) 34'; H. Al-Sibyani (yellow card) 54'; Hoedt (yellow card) 86'; Matuq (red card) 90+6'	Stadium: Al-Taawoun Club Stadium; Attendance: 4,294; Referee: Majed Al-Shamrani

14 January 2026 15	Al-Shabab	3–2	Neom	Riyadh
20:30	Al-Hammami 4'; Carrasco 57' (pen.), 61'; Hernández (yellow card) 87'; Adli (yellow card) 87'	Report	Bouabré 6', (yellow card) 40'; Benrahma 49'; Zézé (yellow card) 56'	Stadium: Al-Awwal Park; Attendance: 2,901; Referee: Shukri Al-Hanfoush

17 January 2026 16	Al-Nassr	3–2	Al-Shabab	Riyadh
20:30	Balobaid 2' (o.g.); Coman 8', (yellow card) 60'; Ghareeb 76'; Al-Ghannam (yellow card) 90+4'; Félix (yellow card) 90+4'	Report	Simakan 31' (o.g.); Carlos Junior 53'; Sierro (yellow card) 61' (yellow-red card) 67'; Brownhill (yellow card) 90+5'	Stadium: Al-Awwal Park; Attendance: 13,388; Referee: Mohammed Al-Hoaish

20 January 2026 17	Al-Shabab	0–0	Al-Najma	Riyadh
18:05		Report	Al-Haleel (yellow card) 43'; Boutobba (yellow card) 64'; Hawsawi (yellow card) 89'	Stadium: SHG Arena; Attendance: 2,802; Referee: Fraih Al-Jaloud

24 January 2026 18	Al-Khaleej	0–0	Al-Shabab	Dammam
16:25	Al-Khabrani (yellow card) 31' (yellow-red card) 68'; Al Hamsal (yellow card) 74'; Hamzi (yellow card) 84'	Report	Balobaid (yellow card) 38'; Al-Shuwayrikh (yellow card) 59'	Stadium: Prince Mohamed bin Fahd Stadium; Attendance: 2,519; Referee: Abdullah Al-Kharboush

29 January 2026 19	Al-Hazem	0–4	Al-Shabab	Ar Rass
20:30	Al-Rashed (yellow card) 32' (yellow-red card) 39'; Al-Dakheel (yellow card) 60'	Report	Carlos 51', 65', 89', (yellow card) 90'; Brownhill 75' (pen.)	Stadium: Al-Hazem Club Stadium; Attendance: 2,464; Referee: Shukri Al-Hanfoush

20 December 2025 10	Al-Shabab	v	Al-Riyadh	Riyadh
16:15				Stadium: SHG Arena

=== King's Cup ===
All times are local, AST (UTC+3).

22 September 2025 Round of 32	Abha	2–2 (a.e.t.) (2–4 p)	Al-Shabab	Abha
18:45	Taira 24'; Yaqoub (yellow card) 42'; Al-Fahad (yellow card) 54'; Al-Menhali (yellow card) 91'; Muralha 97'; Al-Jizani (yellow card) 99'; Al-Ghamdi (yellow card) 106'; Al-Mousa (yellow card) 120+6'	Report	Carrasco 13', (yellow card) 99'; Balobaid (red card) 31'; Hoedt (red card) 45'; Sierro 104', (yellow card) 116'	Stadium: Prince Sultan bin Abdulaziz Sports City; Attendance: 1,187; Referee: Abdullah Al-Harbi
	Penalties
	Sow (penalty scored); Gaari (penalty missed); Al-Mutairi (penalty missed); Taira (penalty scored)		(penalty scored) Carrasco; (penalty scored) Sierro; (penalty scored) Adli; (penalty missed) Carlos; (penalty scored) Al-Subiani

28 October 2025 Round of 16	Al-Shabab	1–0	Al-Zulfi	Riyadh
17:50	Carrasco 35' (pen.); Al-Anazi (yellow card) 42'; H. Al-Sibyani (yellow card) 65'; Grohe (yellow card) 85'; Harbush (red card) 90+7'; Carlos (yellow card) 90+9'	Report	Omondi (yellow card) 7'; Miranda (yellow card) 34'; Al-Hajeri (red card) 90+6'	Stadium: SHG Arena; Attendance: 2,857; Referee: Fareeh Al-Jaloud

29 November 2025 Quarter-finals	Al-Ittihad	4–1	Al-Shabab	Jeddah
20:30	Doumbia 20'; Pereira (yellow card) 21'; Benzema 30', 84', 87'	Report	Hamdallah 14'; Adli (yellow card) 39'; Brownhill (yellow card) 48'	Stadium: Prince Abdullah Al-Faisal Sports City Stadium; Attendance: 15,292; Referee: Danny Makkelie (Netherlands)

=== Gulf Club Champions League ===
==== Group stage ====
Pos	Team	Pld	W	D	L	GF	GA	GD	Pts	Qualification	RAY	SHB	NAH	TAD
1	(Qatar) Al-Rayyan	6	3	3	0	15	5	+10	12	Knockout stage	—	1–1	3–1	5–0
2	(Saudi Arabia) Al-Shabab	6	1	4	1	18	7	+11	7	Knockout stage	2–2	—	1–1	13–0
3	(Oman) Al-Nahda	6	1	4	1	6	7	−1	7		1–1	1–1	—	1–1
4	(Yemen) Al-Tadamun Hadramaut	6	1	1	4	3	23	−20	4		0–3	2–0	0–1	—

Source: GSA
Rules for classification: Group stage tiebreakers

1 October 2025 1	Al-Shabab (Saudi Arabia)	1–1	(Oman) Al-Nahda	Riyadh, Saudi Arabia
21:00 UTC+3	Grohe (red card) 61'; Al-Shuwayrikh (yellow card) 71'; Brownhill 90+3', (yellow card) 90+9'	Report	Al-Harthi (yellow card) 59'; Al Habsi 73' (pen.)	Stadium: SHG Arena; Attendance: 1,132; Referee: Ammar Mahfoodh (Bahrain)

21 October 2025 2	Al-Tadamun Hadramaut (Yemen)	2–0	(Saudi Arabia) Al-Shabab	Al Wakrah, Qatar
21:00 UTC+3	Ban Agag 8'; Elloh Nze 22'; Al Hubaishi (yellow card) 56' (yellow-red card) 77'; Bagayoko (yellow card) 67'; Al Golan (yellow card) 73'	Report	Haraj (yellow card) 38'; Al-Ghulaimish (yellow card) 43'	Stadium: Saoud bin Abdulrahman Stadium; Referee: Ali Doshi (Iraq)

5 November 2025 3	Al-Rayyan (Qatar)	1–1	(Saudi Arabia) Al-Shabab	Doha, Qatar
20:00 UTC+3	Amaro 43'; Yousif (yellow card) 45+2'; Abunada (yellow card) 61'	Report	Al-Rajeh (yellow card) 18' (yellow-red card) 61'; Carrasco 87', (yellow card) 90+6'; Grohe (yellow card) 90+1'	Stadium: Suheim bin Hamad Stadium; Referee: Mohanad Qasim Sarray (Iraq)

23 December 2025 4	Al-Shabab (Saudi Arabia)	v	(Qatar) Al-Rayyan	Riyadh, Saudi Arabia
18:15 UTC+3				Stadium: SHG Arena

11 February 2026 5	Al-Nahda (Oman)	v	(Saudi Arabia) Al-Shabab	Al-Buraimi, Oman
19:00 UTC+4				Stadium: Al-Buraimi Sports Complex

18 February 2026 6	Al-Shabab (Saudi Arabia)	v	(Yemen) Al-Tadamun Hadramaut	Riyadh, Saudi Arabia
18:30 UTC+3				Stadium: SHG Arena

== Statistics ==
=== Appearances ===
Last updated on 29 January 2026.

No.	Pos	Nat	Player	Total		Pro League		King's Cup		Gulf Club Champions League	
No.	Pos	Nat	Player	Apps	Goals	Apps	Goals	Apps	Goals	Apps	Goals
Goalkeepers
23	GK	(Saudi Arabia) KSA	Abdulaziz Al-Awairdhi	2	0	0	0	0	0	1+1	0
43	GK	(Brazil) BRA	Marcelo Grohe	22	0	17	0	3	0	2	0
55	GK	(Saudi Arabia) KSA	Mishal Saad	0	0	0	0	0	0	0	0
60	GK	(Saudi Arabia) KSA	Mohammed Al-Otaibi	0	0	0	0	0	0	0	0
Defenders
2	DF	(Saudi Arabia) KSA	Mohammed Al-Shuwayrikh	21	0	13+2	0	3	0	3	0
4	DF	(Netherlands) NED	Wesley Hoedt	23	0	18	0	2	0	3	0
5	DF	(Saudi Arabia) KSA	Ali Makki	9	0	4+5	0	0	0	0	0
16	DF	(Saudi Arabia) KSA	Hussain Al-Sibyani	9	0	5+3	0	0+1	0	0	0
17	DF	(Saudi Arabia) KSA	Mohammed Al-Thani	5	0	5	0	0	0	0	0
26	DF	(Saudi Arabia) KSA	Amjad Haraj	1	0	0	0	0	0	1	0
31	DF	(Saudi Arabia) KSA	Saad Balobaid	21	0	16+1	0	2	0	2	0
34	DF	(Saudi Arabia) KSA	Sultan Al-Enezi	6	0	1+2	0	1+1	0	1	0
38	DF	(Saudi Arabia) KSA	Mohammed Harbush	6	0	2	0	1	0	1+2	0
63	DF	(Saudi Arabia) KSA	Abdullah Al-Jamaan	0	0	0	0	0	0	0	0
66	DF	(Saudi Arabia) KSA	Nawaf Al-Ghulaimish	10	0	4+2	0	1+1	0	2	0
94	DF	(Saudi Arabia) KSA	Mubarak Al-Rajeh	12	0	8	0	2+1	0	1	0
Midfielders
6	MF	(Saudi Arabia) KSA	Faisal Al-Subiani	21	0	5+10	0	1+2	0	1+2	0
7	MF	(Spain) ESP	Unai Hernández	19	0	13+1	0	2	0	2+1	0
8	MF	(England) ENG	Josh Brownhill	21	4	15	3	3	0	2+1	1
10	MF	(Belgium) BEL	Yannick Carrasco	20	10	13+1	7	3	2	3	1
14	MF	(Switzerland) SUI	Vincent Sierro	19	1	13+1	0	2	1	3	0
20	MF	(Saudi Arabia) KSA	Basil Al-Sayyali	3	0	3	0	0	0	0	0
21	MF	(Saudi Arabia) KSA	Nawaf Al-Sadi	9	0	1+7	0	0	0	1	0
22	MF	(Saudi Arabia) KSA	Hammam Al-Hammami	19	1	7+7	1	2	0	2+1	0
29	MF	(France) FRA	Yacine Adli	15	0	11+1	0	1+1	0	0+1	0
40	MF	(Saudi Arabia) KSA	Ali Al-Asmari	1	0	1	0	0	0	0	0
71	MF	(Saudi Arabia) KSA	Abdulelah Daghar	0	0	0	0	0	0	0	0
72	MF	(Saudi Arabia) KSA	Nasser Al-Sadi	1	0	0+1	0	0	0	0	0
Forwards
9	FW	(Morocco) MAR	Abderrazak Hamdallah	5	2	4	1	1	1	0	0
13	FW	(Brazil) BRA	Carlos	18	4	10+4	4	0+3	0	1	0
19	FW	(Saudi Arabia) KSA	Majed Abdullah	10	0	0+9	0	0	0	0+1	0
37	FW	(Saudi Arabia) KSA	Abdullah Matuq	13	0	5+4	0	1+1	0	0+2	0
64	FW	(Saudi Arabia) KSA	Majed Madani	1	0	0	0	0	0	0+1	0
91	FW	(Saudi Arabia) KSA	Abdulaziz Al-Othman	10	1	2+4	1	2+1	0	1	0
99	FW	(Jordan) JOR	Ali Azaizeh	1	0	0+1	0	0	0	0	0
Players sent out on loan this season
1	GK	(Ukraine) UKR	Heorhiy Bushchan	1	0	1	0	0	0	0	0
77	FW	(Saudi Arabia) KSA	Hisham Al Dubais	0	0	0	0	0	0	0	0
Player who made an appearance this season but have left the club
70	FW	(Saudi Arabia) KSA	Haroune Camara	1	0	1	0	0	0	0	0

=== Goalscorers ===
Rank	No.	Pos	Nat	Name	Pro League	King's Cup	Gulf Club Champions League	Total
1	10	MF	(Belgium)	Yannick Carrasco	7	2	1	10
2	8	MF	(England)	Josh Brownhill	3	0	1	4
2	13	FW	(Brazil)	Carlos	4	0	0	4
4	9	FW	(Morocco)	Abderrazak Hamdallah	1	1	0	2
5	14	MF	(Switzerland)	Vincent Sierro	0	1	0	1
5	22	MF	(Saudi Arabia)	Hammam Al-Hammami	1	0	0	1
5	91	FW	(Saudi Arabia)	Abdulaziz Al-Othman	1	0	0	1
Own goal					1	0	0	1
Total					18	4	2	24

Last Updated: 29 January 2026

=== Assists ===
Rank	No.	Pos	Nat	Name	Pro League	King Cup	Gulf Club Champions League	Total
1	10	MF	(Belgium)	Yannick Carrasco	3	0	0	3
2	8	MF	(England)	Josh Brownhill	1	0	1	2
3	2	DF	(Saudi Arabia)	Mohammed Al-Shuwayrikh	1	0	0	1
3	6	MF	(Saudi Arabia)	Faisal Al-Subiani	0	1	0	1
3	7	MF	(Spain)	Unai Hernández	1	0	0	1
3	9	FW	(Morocco)	Abderrazak Hamdallah	1	0	0	1
3	22	MF	(Saudi Arabia)	Hammam Al-Hammami	0	1	0	1
3	29	MF	(France)	Yacine Adli	0	0	1	1
3	31	DF	(Saudi Arabia)	Saad Balobaid	1	0	0	1
3	40	MF	(Saudi Arabia)	Ali Al-Asmari	1	0	0	1
Total					9	2	2	13

Last Updated: 29 January 2026

=== Clean sheets ===
Rank	No.	Pos	Nat	Name	Pro League	King Cup	Gulf Club Champions League	Total
1	43	GK	(Brazil)	Marcelo Grohe	5	1	0	6
Total					5	1	0	6

Last Updated: 29 January 2026
