= 2025–26 AGCFF Gulf Club Champions League =

دوري أبطال الخليج للأندية 2025–26

Tournament details
- Dates: 30 September 2025 – 23 April 2026
- Teams: 8 (from 1 confederation) (from 8 associations)

Final positions
- Champions: (Qatar) Al-Rayyan (1st title)
- Runners-up: (Saudi Arabia) Al-Shabab

Tournament statistics
- Matches played: 27
- Goals scored: 73 (2.7 per match)
- Top scorer: (Morocco) Abderrazak Hamdallah (7 goals)
- Best player: (Brazil) Róger Guedes
- Best goalkeeper: (Qatar) Mahmud Abunada

The 2025–26 AGCFF Gulf Club Champions League was the 32nd edition of the AGCFF Gulf Club Champions League, a football competition for clubs from the eight member nations of the Arab Gulf Cup Football Federation (AGCFF). Duhok were the reigning champions, but they were unable to defend their title as they failed to qualify.

The winners of the competition were Al-Rayyan, who won their first title with a 3–0 victory over Al-Shabab in the final.

== Teams ==
Team	Qualification method	App. (last)
(Bahrain) Sitra	2024–25 Bahraini Premier League third place	1st
(Iraq) Zakho	2024–25 Iraq Stars League third place	1st
(Kuwait) Al-Qadsia	2024–25 Kuwaiti Premier League third place	7th (2024–25)
(Oman) Al-Nahda	2024–25 Oman Professional League runners-up	4th (2014)
(Qatar) Al-Rayyan	2024–25 Qatar Stars League fifth place	6th (2015)
(Saudi Arabia) Al-Shabab	2024–25 Saudi Pro League sixth place	4th (1995)
(United Arab Emirates) Al-Ain	2024–25 UAE Pro League fifth place	4th (2001)
(Yemen) Al-Tadamun Hadramaut	2023–24 Yemeni League runners-up	1st

Notes

1. Saudi Arabia (KSA): The 2024–25 Saudi Pro League's fourth-placed team, Al-Qadsiah, declined to participate in the tournament.
2. Yemen (YEM): The Yemeni League was not held in the 2024–25 season. As the 2023–24 champions Al-Ahli Sanaa qualified for the previous season's tournament, the runners-up Al-Tadamun Hadramaut were entered into this season's competition.

=== Draw ===
The draw was held on 11 August 2025. The eight teams were drawn into two groups of four, by selecting one team from each of the four ranked pots. For the draw, the clubs were allocated to four pots based on the FIFA World Rankings of their nations as at 10 July 2025.

Pot 1	Pot 2	Pot 3	Pot 4
(Qatar) Al-Rayyan (Iraq) Zakho	(Saudi Arabia) Al-Shabab (United Arab Emirates) Al-Ain	(Oman) Al-Nahda (Bahrain) Sitra	(Kuwait) Al-Qadsia (Yemen) Al-Tadamun Hadramaut

== Group stage ==
Tiebreakers
Teams were ranked according to points (3 points for a win, 1 point for a draw, 0 points for a loss), and if tied on points, the following tiebreaking criteria were applied, in the order given, to determine the rankings:
1. Points in head-to-head matches among tied teams;
2. Goal difference in head-to-head matches among tied teams;
3. Goals scored in head-to-head matches among tied teams;
4. If more than two teams were tied, and after applying all head-to-head criteria above, a subset of teams were still tied, all head-to-head criteria above was reapplied exclusively to this subset of teams;
5. Goal difference in all group matches;
6. Goals scored in all group matches;
7. Disciplinary points (yellow card = 1 point, red card as a result of two yellow cards = 3 points, direct red card = 3 points, yellow card followed by direct red card = 4 points);
8. Drawing of lots.

=== Group A ===
Pos	Team	Pld	W	D	L	GF	GA	GD	Pts	Qualification	ZAK	QAD	AIN	SIT
1	(Iraq) Zakho	6	4	1	1	9	4	+5	13	Knockout stage	—	3–1	2–0	3–2
2	(Kuwait) Al-Qadsia	6	3	1	2	5	5	0	10	Knockout stage	1–0	—	0–1	2–1
3	(United Arab Emirates) Al-Ain	6	3	0	3	6	5	+1	9		0–1	0–1	—	4–1
4	(Bahrain) Sitra	6	0	2	4	4	10	−6	2		0–0	0–0	0–1	—

Source: GSA
Rules for classification: Group stage tiebreakers
30 September 2025
20:30 UTC+4

Al-Ain (United Arab Emirates)	4–1	(Bahrain) Sitra
Jamal 21' (o.g.); Suleiman 82'; H. Rahimi 88'; Sarki 90+1'	Report	Cavafe 41'

Hazza bin Zayed Stadium, Al Ain
Referee: Faisal Al-Balawi (Saudi Arabia)
30 September 2025
21:30 UTC+3

Zakho (Iraq)	3–1	(Kuwait) Al-Qadsia
Echeta 15'; Karim 45+6', 47'	Report	Soulah 8' (pen.)

Duhok Stadium, Duhok
Referee: Yahya Al-Balushi (Oman)

22 October 2025
19:00 UTC+3

Sitra (Bahrain)	0–0	(Iraq) Zakho
	Report

Khalifa Sports City Stadium, Isa Town
Referee: Omar Al-Yaqoubi (Oman)
22 October 2025
21:00 UTC+3

Al-Qadsia (Kuwait)	0–1	(United Arab Emirates) Al-Ain
	Report	Suleiman 68'

Mohammed Al-Hamad Stadium, Hawally
Referee: Salman Falahi (Qatar)

4 November 2025
18:00 UTC+3

Sitra (Bahrain)	0–0	(Kuwait) Al-Qadsia
	Report

Khalifa Sports City Stadium, Isa Town
Referee: Abdulrahman Al-Jassim (Qatar)
4 November 2025
20:00 UTC+3

Zakho (Iraq)	2–0	(United Arab Emirates) Al-Ain
Attwan 16' (pen.); Adam 33'	Report

Zakho International Stadium, Zakho
Referee: Mohammed Al-Hoaish (Saudi Arabia)

23 December 2025
18:30 UTC+4

Al-Ain (United Arab Emirates)	0–1	(Iraq) Zakho
	Report	Al-Gahwashi 53'

Hazza bin Zayed Stadium, Al Ain
Referee: Faisal Al-Balawi (Saudi Arabia)
24 December 2025
20:00 UTC+3

Al-Qadsia (Kuwait)	2–1	(Bahrain) Sitra
Kebano 29', 66'	Report	Rangi 72'

Mohammed Al-Hamad Stadium, Hawally
Referee: Ahmed Al-Kaf (Oman)

10 February 2026
18:00 UTC+3

Sitra (Bahrain)	0–1	(United Arab Emirates) Al-Ain
	Report	Naafo 90+1'

Khalifa Sports City Stadium, Isa Town
Referee: Omar Al-Yaqoubi (Oman)
10 February 2026
20:00 UTC+3

Al-Qadsia (Kuwait)	1–0	(Iraq) Zakho
Al‑Haqan 27'	Report

Mohammed Al-Hamad Stadium, Hawally
Referee: Abdulhadi Al-Ruaile (Qatar)

18 February 2026
20:30 UTC+3

Zakho (Iraq)	3–2	(Bahrain) Sitra
Rostam 29'; Attwan 53', 90+9' (pen.)	Report	Bezerra 60'; Al-Matari 90+20' (pen.)

Zakho International Stadium, Zakho
Referee: Said Al-Mezeini (Oman)
18 February 2026
21:30 UTC+4

Al-Ain (United Arab Emirates)	0–1	(Kuwait) Al-Qadsia
	Report	Al-Mutawa 50'

Hazza bin Zayed Stadium, Al Ain
Referee: Mohammed Sami Al-Ismail (Saudi Arabia)

=== Group B ===
Pos	Team	Pld	W	D	L	GF	GA	GD	Pts	Qualification	RAY	SHB	NAH	TAD
1	(Qatar) Al-Rayyan	6	3	3	0	15	5	+10	12	Knockout stage	—	1–1	3–1	5–0
2	(Saudi Arabia) Al-Shabab	6	1	4	1	18	7	+11	7	Knockout stage	2–2	—	1–1	13–0
3	(Oman) Al-Nahda	6	1	4	1	6	7	−1	7		1–1	1–1	—	1–1
4	(Yemen) Al-Tadamun Hadramaut	6	1	1	4	3	23	−20	4		0–3	2–0	0–1	—

Source: GSA
Rules for classification: Group stage tiebreakers
1 October 2025
19:00 UTC+3

Al-Rayyan (Qatar)	5–0	(Yemen) Al-Tadamun Hadramaut
Guedes 17', 28'; Tlili 49' (o.g.); Rodrigo 68'; Mitrović 90+6'	Report

Ahmad bin Ali Stadium, Al Rayyan
Referee: Mohamed Al Harmodi (United Arab Emirates)
1 October 2025
21:00 UTC+3

Al-Shabab (Saudi Arabia)	1–1	(Oman) Al-Nahda
Brownhill 90+3'	Report	Al Habsi 73' (pen.)

SHG Arena, Riyadh
Referee: Ammar Mahfoodh (Bahrain)

21 October 2025
21:00 UTC+3

Al-Tadamun Hadramaut (Yemen)	2–0	(Saudi Arabia) Al-Shabab
Agag 8'; Elloh Nze 22'	Report

Saoud bin Abdulrahman Stadium, Al Wakrah
Referee: Ali Hussein Doshi (Iraq)
22 October 2025
20:30 UTC+4

Al-Nahda (Oman)	1–1	(Qatar) Al-Rayyan
Oloumou 35'	Report	Rodrigo 66'

Sultan Qaboos Sports Complex, Muscat
Referee: Husain Al Showaikh (Bahrain)

5 November 2025
18:00 UTC+4

Al-Nahda (Oman)	1–1	(Yemen) Al-Tadamun Hadramaut
Oloumou 50'	Report	Al-Golan 62' (pen.)

Sultan Qaboos Sports Complex, Muscat
Referee: Ahmed Al-Ali (Kuwait)
5 November 2025
20:00 UTC+3

Al-Rayyan (Qatar)	1–1	(Saudi Arabia) Al-Shabab
Amaro 43'	Report	Carrasco 87'

Suheim bin Hamad Stadium, Doha
Referee: Mohanad Qasim Sarray (Iraq)

23 December 2025
18:15 UTC+3

Al-Shabab (Saudi Arabia)	2–2	(Qatar) Al-Rayyan
Matuq 52'; Hamdallah 58'	Report	Wesley 5', 40'

SHG Arena, Riyadh
Referee: Ahmed Eisa Darwish (United Arab Emirates)
24 December 2025
18:30 UTC+3

Al-Tadamun Hadramaut (Yemen)	0–1	(Oman) Al-Nahda
	Report	Gui 65' (pen.)

Saoud bin Abdulrahman Stadium, Al Wakrah
Referee: Mohanad Qasim Sarray (Iraq)

10 February 2026
19:00 UTC+4

Al-Nahda (Oman)	1–1	(Saudi Arabia) Al-Shabab
Al-Habsi 90'	Report	U. Hernandez 59'

Al-Seeb Stadium, Seeb
Referee: Mohamed Al Harmodi (United Arab Emirates)
11 February 2026
17:30 UTC+3

Al-Tadamun Hadramaut (Yemen)	0–3	(Qatar) Al-Rayyan
	Report	Rodrigo 5'; Mitrović 62'; Surag 72'

Saoud bin Abdulrahman Stadium, Al Wakrah
Attendance: Mohamed Ebrahim (Bahrain)

17 February 2026
20:30 UTC+3

Al-Shabab (Saudi Arabia)	13–0	(Yemen) Al-Tadamun Hadramaut
Brownhill 4', 13', 43' (pen.); Carrasco 11', 19', 32'; Hamdallah 34', 58', 62', 65', 68', 89'; Azaizeh 76'	Report

SHG Arena, Riyadh
Referee: Ahmed Eisa Darwish (United Arab Emirates)
17 February 2026
20:30 UTC+3

Al-Rayyan (Qatar)	3–1	(Oman) Al-Nahda
Alaaeldin 21'; Guedes 56'; Mitrović 71'	Report	Messouke 64'

Ahmad bin Ali Stadium, Al Rayyan
Referee: Zaid Thamer Mohammed (Iraq)

== Knockout stage ==
Due to the 2026 Iran war, the semi-finals and final were postponed and subsequently reduced to single leg matches at a centralised venue in April.

Zakho, Al-Shabab and Al-Rayyan each made bids to host the knockout stage matches, and on 2 April 2026, the Arab Gulf Cup Football Federation announced Al-Rayyan as the host team.

=== Bracket ===
Semi-finals
(Iraq) Zakho	1 (3)
(Saudi Arabia) Al-Shabab (p)	1 (4)
(Qatar) Al-Rayyan	2
(Kuwait) Al-Qadsia	0

Final
(Saudi Arabia) Al-Shabab	0
(Qatar) Al-Rayyan	3

=== Semi-finals ===
19 April 2026
17:00 UTC+3

Zakho (Iraq)	1–1 (a.e.t.)	(Saudi Arabia) Al-Shabab
Echeta 74'	Report	Carrasco 90+2' (pen.)
Penalties
Ali (penalty scored); Kiki (penalty missed); Attwan (penalty scored); Ali Sola (penalty scored); Orinho (penalty missed)	3–4	(penalty scored) Carrasco; (penalty scored) Hamdallah; (penalty scored) Adli; (penalty scored) Hoedt; (penalty missed) Al-Asmari

Khalifa International Stadium, Al-Rayyan
Referee: Qasim Al-Hatmi (Oman)
19 April 2026
20:00 UTC+3

Al-Rayyan (Qatar)	2–0	(Kuwait) Al-Qadsia
Guedes 17'; Mitrović 50'	Report

Ahmad bin Ali Stadium, Al-Rayyan
Referee: Ammar Mahfoodh (Bahrain)

=== Final ===
23 April 2026
18:45 UTC+3

Al-Shabab (Saudi Arabia)	0–3	(Qatar) Al-Rayyan
	Report	D. García 60'; Mitrović 78'; Guedes 81'

Ahmad bin Ali Stadium, Al-Rayyan
Referee: Adel Al-Naqbi (United Arab Emirates)

== Prize money and awards ==
=== Prize money ===
Position	Amount (USD)
Champions	3,000,000
Runners-up	1,000,000

=== Player awards ===
The following awards were given:

Award	Player
Top Scorer	(Morocco) Abderrazak Hamdallah
Most Valuable Player	(Brazil) Róger Guedes
Best Goalkeeper	(Qatar) Mahmud Abunada

== See also ==
- 2026 CAFA Silk Way Cup
- 2026 SAFF Club Championship
- 2025–26 ASEAN Club Championship
