= Abdulaziz Masnoum =

Yemeni footballer (born 2006)

Abdulaziz Masnoum عبد العزيز مصنوم
Personal information
- Full name: Abdulaziz Awadh Khamis Masnoum
- Date of birth: 6 February 2006 (age 20)
- Place of birth: Hadhramaut, Yemen
- Position: Forward

Team information
- Current team: Al-Orobah
- Number: 99

Youth career
- –2022: Al-Tadamun Hadramaut

Senior career*
Years	Team	Apps	(Gls)
2022–2025	Al-Tadamun Hadramaut		
2024–2025	→ Al-Orobah (loan)	3	(0)
2025–	Al-Orobah	0	(0)

International career^{‡}
2024–	Yemen	5	(1)
- * Club domestic league appearances and goals as of 16:00, 22 November 2025 (UTC) ‡ National team caps and goals as of 16:00, 22 November 2025 (UTC)

Abdulaziz Masnoum (Arabic: عبد العزيز مصنوم; born 6 February 2006) is a Yemeni footballer who plays for Al-Orobah and the Yemen national team as a forward. In January 2025, he became the first Yemeni player to ever appear in the Saudi Pro League.

== Club career ==
Masnoum began his career with local Yemeni League club Al-Tadamun Hadramaut. He made his senior debut for the club in 2022. He was a key member of the Al-Tadamun squad that finished runners-up in the Yemeni League in 2023–24.

In October 2024, he was loaned to the academy of Saudi Pro League club Al-Orobah. He made an immediate impact, scoring four goals in his first two Saudi Youth Premier League matches. After scoring seven goals in his first fifteen matches with the youth side, he was included in the senior roster for the first time on 17 January 2025 for a match against Al-Khaleej FC. Masnoum entered the match in the fifty-seventh minute, becoming the first-ever Yemeni player to appear in the SPL.

On 4 September 2025, Masnoum renews his contract with Al-Orobah.

== International career ==
Masnoum represented Yemen at various youth levels. In June 2024, he scored against Oman U17 in the AFC Youth Championship held in Saudi Arabia. Yemen won the match 3–1. Later that year, he was part of the nation's squad for 2025 AFC U-20 Asian Cup qualification. He scored two goals in the team's 3–1 victory over Timor-Leste to open the campaign. Masnoum was included in the national under-23 team for 2026 AFC U-23 Asian Cup qualification in September 2025. He scored in Yemen's opening-match win against Singapore.

Masnoum made his senior international debut for Yemen on 6 June 2024 in a 2026 FIFA World Cup qualification match against Bahrain. He scored his first senior international goal on 14 October 2025 in a 9–0 victory over Bhutan in 2027 AFC Asian Cup qualification.

=== International goals ===
Scores and results list Yemen's goal tally first.

No.	Date	Venue	Opponent	Score	Result	Competition
1.	14 October 2025	Jaber Al-Ahmad International Stadium, Kuwait City, Kuwait	Bhutan	5–0	9–0	2027 AFC Asian Cup qualification
Last updated 22 November 2025

=== International career statistics ===
As of match played 18 November 2025

Yemen
Year	Apps	Goals
2024	2	0
2025	3	1
Total	5	1
