= 2025–26 Republic Cup (Yemen) =

Tournament details
- Dates: 23 April –
- Teams: 64

The 2025–26 Republic Cup is the premier knockout competition in domestic Yemeni football. It began on 23 April 2026 and involves 64 teams.

The draw was held on 16 April.

== Schedule ==
Round	Dates
First round	23–26 April 2026
Round of 64	7 May 2026–28 June 2026
Round of 32	16 July 2026

== Preliminary Round ==
25 April 2026	Al-Minaa Aden	3–0; Awarded (Note: On 7 May, the Yemen Football Association upheld a protest by Al-Minaa Aden against Sharara Lahij for fielding players officially registered with Al-Husseini Lahij Club. The match, originally won 0–2 by Sharara Lahij, was awarded to Al-Minaa Aden by a score of 3–0.)	Al-Sharara Lahj	Aden
15:45				Stadium: Hubaishi Stadium

25 April 2026	Shabab Al-Zaydiyah	1–1 (3–2 p)	Al-Nasr Rayma	Hodeidah
15:45				Stadium: Al-Alfi Stadium

== Round of 64 ==
23 April 2026	Azal	2–1	Al-Fath Dhamar

23 April 2026	Shabab Al-Jeel	3–1	Shabab Abs

23 April 2026	Al-Husseini Lahj	2–2 (4–2 p)	Al-Ain Abyan

23 April 2026	Tadamun Shabwa	0–0 (5–4 p)	Nasr Al-Dhali’

24 April 2026	Al-Rasheed	4–3	Shabab Al-Mahwit

24 April 2026	Ahli Aden	4–2	Khanfar Abyan

24 April 2026	Wehdat Al-Mukalla	3–1	Irfan Abyan

26 April 2026	Ahli Al-Hudaydah	1–2	22 May	Hodeidah
				Stadium: Al-Alfi Stadium

7 May 2026	Shaab Ibb	6–0	Shaqra Abyan	Ibb
				Stadium: Ibb Sports Stadium

7 May 2026	Al-Shula	8–0	Najm Saba Dhamar	Aden
				Stadium: Hubaishi Stadium

9 May 2026	Al-Saqr Taiz	1–1 (1–3 p)	Al-Minaa Aden
15:45

9 May 2026	Salam Saada	0–2	Ahli Taiz	Sanaa
15:45				Stadium: Al-Tharafi Stadium

9 May 2026	Al-Wahda Aden	4–1	Al-Urouba Al-Shabariq	Aden
15:45				Stadium: Hubaishi Stadium

9 May 2026	Samaoon	11–0	Shabab Hamdan	Mukalla
15:45	Mohammed Awad Ba’mabed; Sami Saeed Bayser; Sami Basiod; Abdullah Bar’iyah; Abdulrahman Fahd Ghadaf; Mujahid Aref Bashamkha			Stadium: Baradem Mukalla Stadium

10 May 2026	Shaab Sana'a	2–0	Shabab Sayhut	Sanaa
15:40				Stadium: Al-Tharafi Stadium

11 May 2026	Taliat Taiz	0–1	Seiyun	Taiz
15:30			Shukri Suwailih	Stadium: Al-Shohada'a Stadium

11 May 2026	Shabab Areeb	0–5	Al-Tilal	Sanaa

11 May 2026	Shamsan	3–0	Wehdat Amran	Aden
				Stadium: Hubaishi Stadium

6 June 2026	Al-Yarmuk	0–1	Shabab Markhah

7 June 2026	Ahli Sanaa	5–0	Shabab Oktobar

18 June 2026	Tadamun Hadramaut	8–0	Halal Aween	Mukalla
16:00 UTC+3				Stadium: Baradem Stadium

18 June 2026	Al-Sadd Marib	6–0	Shabab Juban	Marib
16:00 UTC+3				Stadium: Marib Stadium

20 June 2026	Shabab Al Bayda	2–1	Al-Mina'a Al-Mukha	Taiz

20 June 2026	Qarnaw Al-Jawf	0–6	Hilal Al-Hudaydah	Sanaa
				Stadium: Al-Tharafi Stadium

20 June 2026	Fahman Abyan	10–0	Ittihad Al-Odein

21 June 2026	Salam Al-Gharfa	3–0; Awarded	Shabab Al-Quds	Seiyun
				Stadium: Seiyun Stadium

21 June 2026	Al-Mukalla	3–1	Shabab Al-Zaydiya	Mukalla
				Stadium: Baradem Stadium

21 June 2026	Wahda Sana'a	1–0	Radfan Socotra	Sanaa
				Stadium: Al-Tharafi Stadium

21 June 2026	Ittihad Ibb	4–1	Al-Shorta	Ibb
				Stadium: 22 May Stadium

22 June 2026	Al-Urooba	3–0	Al-Jeel Al-Saed	Sanaa
				Stadium: Al-Tharafi Stadium

23 June 2026	Tadamun Al-Mahwit	0–13	Shaab Hadramaut	Sanaa
				Stadium: Al-Tharafi Stadium

28 June 2026	Rahban Harad	0–7	Ittihad Hadramaut	Sanaa
				Stadium: 22 May Stadium

== Round of 32 ==
17 July 2026	AlMenaa Aden	3–6	Shaab Ibb	Al-Hubaishi Stadium

18 July 2026	Shabab Markha	3–0	Shabab AlJeel	Al-Khalifi Stadium

23 July 2026	Wehdat Aden	3–0	Samoon	Al-Hubaishi Stadium

26 July 2026	Shaab Hadramout	2–0	AlHusaini	Baradem Stadium

26 July 2026	Shaab Sana'a	4–1	Shabab Albayda	AlDhurafi Stadium

26 July 2026	Seiyun	2–1	Al Oruba	Seyoun Stadium

27 July 2026	22 May	1–0	Itehad Ibb	22 May Stadium

29 July 2026	Ahli Aden	0–0 (5–4 p)	Fahman	Al-Hubaishi Stadium

30 July 2026	Ahli Sana'a	5–2	AlRasheed	AlDhurafi Stadium

30 July 2026	Al Helal	1–1 (4–1 p)	Azal	Al-Ulufi Stadium

30 July 2026	Salam AlGhorfa	2–0	Al Shula	Seyoun Stadium

30 July 2026	Al Sadd	3–0	Wehdat AlMukala	Mareb Stadium

31 July 2026	Ittihad Hadramout	1–1 (3–4 p)	AlTelal	Seyoun Stadium

31 July 2026	Tadamon Hadramout	3–1	Shamsan	Baradem Stadium

4 August 2026	Ahli Taiz	0–2	Wehda Sana'a	Al-Shuhada Stadium

5 August 2026	Al Mukala	0–0 (4–3 p)	Tadamon Shabwa	Bar Stadium

== Round of 16 ==
27 August 2026	Tadamun Hadramaut	0–0 (4–3 p)	Al-Sadd Marib	Mukalla
				Stadium: Baradem Stadium

28 August 2026	Wehda Sana'a	2–0	Hilal Al-Hudaydah	Sanaa
				Stadium: Al-Dhurafi Stadium

28 August 2026	Al-Mukalla	0–1	Wehdat Aden	Mukalla
				Stadium: Baradem Stadium

28 August 2026	Al-Tilal	2–4	Shaab Hadramaut	Aden
				Stadium: Al-Hubaishi Stadium

29 August 2026	Shaab Sana'a	1–1 (4–3 p)	Shabab Markha	Sanaa
				Stadium: Al-Dhurafi Stadium

29 August 2026	Seiyun	2–1	Ahli Sana'a	Seiyun
				Stadium: Seiyun Stadium

4 September 2026	Salam Al-Gharfa	1–0	Ahli Aden	Al-Barg Stadium

11 September 2026	Shaab Ibb	3–1	22 May	22 May Stadium

== Quarter-finals ==
17 September 2026	Shaab Hadramaut	1–0	Salam Al-Gharfa	Mukalla
				Stadium: Baradem Stadium

25 September 2026	Wehdat Aden	0–0 (5–3 p)	Tadamun Hadramaut	Aden
				Stadium: Al-Hubaishi Stadium

26 September 2026	Seiyun	0-1	Shaab Ibb	Al-Barg Stadium
15:45

27 September 2026	Wehda Sana'a	1-1 (4–2 p)	Shaab Sana'a	Sanaa
15:45				Stadium: Al-Dhurafi Stadium
