= 2007–08 Al-Shabab FC season =

Saudi Arabian football club season

The 2007–08 Al-Shabab FC season was the 60th season of competitive football played by Al Shabab KSA. The club ended the campaign third in the Saudi Premier League. Al-Shabab reached the semi-finals of the 2007–08 Saudi Crown Prince Cup and was knocked out by an own goal by Faisal Al Obeli. In the Federation Cup (Prince Faisal Cup), the club also reached the semi-finals which end in a draw and lost the penalty kicks 5–4. The club won the 2008 King Cup of Champions.

== Saudi Premier League 2007-08 ==
2007-08-24

| Al Shabab | 1 – 1 | Al-Nasr |
|---|---|---|
| Martínez 52' | | Issam Merdassi 14' |

Faisal bin Fahd Stadium, Riyadh
2007-08-31

| Al-Ta'ee | 0 – 0 | Al Shabab |

AbdulAziz bin Musa'ed Stadium, Ha'il
2007-09-13

| Al Shabab | 1 – 3 | Al-Ahli |
|---|---|---|
| Martínez 70' | | Anderson Nunez 12' Khaled Badrah 55' 66' |

Faisal bin Fahd Stadium, Riyadh
2007-09-22

| Al Shabab | 2 – 1 | Al-Wehda |
|---|---|---|
| Martínez 5' Ahmed Otaif 80' | | Eisa Al Mehyani 44' |

Faisal bin Fahd Stadium, Riyadh
2007-09-26

| Najran SC | 1 – 2 | Al Shabab |
|---|---|---|
| Abdullah Haidar 46' | | Abdullah Al Shuhail 1' Ahmed Otaif 8' |

AbdulAziz bin Musa'ed Stadium, Ha'il
2007-10-18

| Al Shabab | 2 – 1 | Al-Hazm |
|---|---|---|
| Michael Eneramo 10' | | Safwan Al Mowaled 19' Fahd Al Sbeiy 35' |

King Fahd Stadium, Riyadh
2007-10-28

| Al-Ittifaq | 0 – 0 | Al Shabab |

Mohamed bin Fahd Stadium, Dammam
2007-11-05

| Qadysia | 2 – 5 | Al Shabab |
|---|---|---|
| Yousef Al Salem 2' Saleh AlOweinam 46' | | Nasser Al-Shamrani 54' Nasser Al-Shamrani 64' Nasser Al-Shamrani 80' Marcelo Camatcho 85' Abdoh Otaif 91' |

Saud bin Jalawi Stadium, Khobar
2007-11-29

| Al-Watani | 0 – 1 | Al Shabab |
|---|---|---|
| | | Nasser Al-Shamrani 25' |

Khalid bin Abdul Aziz Stadium, Tabuk
2007-12-05

| Al-Nasr | 2 – 2 | Al Shabab |
|---|---|---|
| Saad Al-Harthi 32' (pen.); Mohammed Al-shahrani 66' | | Nasser Al-Shamrani 30'; Naji Majrashi 83' |

Faisal bin Fahd Stadium, Riyadh
2007-12-11

| Al Shabab | 3 – 2 | Al-Ittihad Jeddah |
|---|---|---|
| Abdoh Otaif 14' Nasser Al-Shamrani 40' (pen.) Nasser Al-Shamrani 79' | | Magnu Alvase 48' Mohammed Nour 35' (pen.) |

Faisal bin Fahd Stadium, Riyadh
2007-12-15

| Al Shabab | 2 – 0 | Al-Ta'ee |
|---|---|---|
| Nasser Al-Shamrani 56' Marcelo Camatcho 76' |

Faisal bin Fahd Stadium, Riyadh
2007-12-28

| Al-Ahli | 1 – 3 | Al Shabab |
|---|---|---|
| Naser Al-Salmy 5' | | Naji Majrashi 61' Naji Majrashi 68' Nasser Al-Shamrani 90' |

Abdullah al-Faisal Stadium, Jeddah
2008-01-03

| Al-Wehda | 0 – 3 | Al Shabab |
|---|---|---|
| | | Nasser Al-Shamrani 16' Naji Majrashi 75' |

King Abdul Aziz Stadium, Mecca
2008-01-13

| Al Shabab | 2 – 2 | Najran SC |
|---|---|---|
| Nasser Al-Shamrani 46' (pen.) Nasser Al-Shamrani 83' | | Wilson Antonio 27' 81' |

King Fahd Stadium, Riyadh
2008-01-24

| Al Shabab | 2 – 1 | Qadysia |
|---|---|---|
| Naji Majrashi 32' Abdullah Al-Shuhail 71' | | Zeid Al Mowaled 81' Own Goal |

Faisal bin Fahd Stadium, Riyadh
2008-02-22

| Al Hazm | 0 – 0 | Al Shabab |

Prince Mohamed bin Jalawi Stadium, Ar Rass
2008-03-13

| Al Shabab | 2 – 1 | Al-Ittifaq |
|---|---|---|
| Ahmed Otaif 35' Abdoh Otaif 74' | | Saleh Basheer 78' |

Faisal bin Fahd Stadium, Riyadh
2008-03-30

| Al-Ittihad Jeddah | 1 – 1 | Al Shabab |
|---|---|---|
| Al-Hasan Keita 70' | | Naif Al-Qadi 75' |

Abdullah al-Faisal Stadium, Jeddah
2008-04-04

| Al Shabab | 1 – 1 | Al-Hilal |
|---|---|---|
| Nasser Al-Shamrani 58' (pen.) | | Sultan Al Saood 39' |

King Fahd Stadium, Riyadh
2008-04-09

| Al-Hilal | 0 – 0 | Al Shabab |

King Fahd Stadium, Riyadh
2008-04-13

| Al Shabab | 6 – 0 | Al-Watani |
|---|---|---|
| Nasser Al-Shamrani 13' Yaseen Hema 33' Own Goal Nasser Al-Shamrani 65' 82' 87' 90' (pen.) |

Faisal bin Fahd Stadium, Riyadh

== Crown Prince Cup ==
=== Round of 16 ===
2008-02-08

| Al Shabab | 2 – 0 | Dhamk |
|---|---|---|
| Nasser Al-Shamrani 40' Martínez 71' |

Faisal bin Fahd Stadium, Riyadh

=== Quarterfinal ===
2008-02-13

| Al-Watani | 0 – 2 | Al Shabab |
|---|---|---|
| | | Hasan Mouath 48' Martínez 58' |

Khalid bin Abdul Aziz Stadium, Tabuk

=== Semi-final ===
2008-02-26

| Al Shabab | 0 – 0 | Al-Hilal |

King Fahd Stadium, Riyadh
2008-03-01

| Al-Hilal | 1 – 0 | Al Shabab |
|---|---|---|
| Faisal Al Obeli 40' Own Goal |

King Fahd Stadium, Riyadh

== Federation Cup (Prince Faisal Cup) ==
=== Group stage ===
2007-12-31

| Al Shabab | 1 – 0 | Al Hazm |
|---|---|---|
| Hasan Mouath 73' |

Faisal bin Fahd Stadium, Riyadh
2008-01-09

| Al-Ittifaq | 0 – 2 | Al Shabab |
|---|---|---|
| | | Ali Otaif 81' Ahmed Kaaby 82' |

Mohamed bin Fahd Stadium, Dammam
2008-01-15

| Al Shabab | 1 – 0 | Najran SC |
|---|---|---|
| Ali Otaif 58' (pen.) | | Sultan Al Munif 89' |

Faisal bin Fahd Stadium, Riyadh
2008-01-22

| Al Hazm | 0 – 2 | Al Shabab |
|---|---|---|
| | | Martínez 13' Abdulaziz Al-Saeran 81' |

Prince Mohamed bin Jalawi, Ar Rass
2008-02-07

| Al Shabab | 4 – 1 | Al-Hilal |
|---|---|---|
| Bashar Abdullah 16' Abdulaziz Al-Saeran 54' Marcelo Camatcho 64' Marcelo Camatcho 90' | | Meshal Al-Mori 13' |

King Fahd International Stadium, Riyadh
2008-02-16

| Al-Qadisiyiah Al-Khubar | 2 – 5 | Al Shabab |
|---|---|---|
| Ahmed Al-Talehi 57' | | Abdulaziz Al-Saeran 12' (pen.) Ahmed Al-Kaeby 15' |

Saud bin Jalawi Stadium, Khobar
2008-02-24

| Al Shabab | 3 – 1 | Al-Ittifaq |
|---|---|---|
| Faisal Al-Sultan 32' 55' 59' | | Bader Al-Khamis 35' |

Faisal bin Fahd Stadium, Riyadh
2008-03-16

| Al-Hilal | 1 – 1 | Al Shabab |
|---|---|---|
| Nawaf Al-Temyat 9' | | Abdulaziz Al-Yousef 87' |

Faisal bin Fahd Stadium, Riyadh

=== Semi-final ===
2008-02-24

| Al Shabab | 2 – 2 * | Al-Nasr |
|---|---|---|
| Ali Otaif 13' Saleh Sadeeq 19' | | Rayan Bilal 4' Mohamed Al-Sharani 83' |

Faisal bin Fahd Stadium, Riyadh
- Al Shabab lost in penalty kicks 5–4.

== Saudi Champions Cup ==
=== Quarter-final ===
2008-04-18

| Al-Ahli | 1 – 6 | Al Shabab |
|---|---|---|
| Mohamed Mesaed 18' | | Nasser Al-Shamrani 30' Faisal Al-Sultan 38' Nasser Al-Shamrani 46' (pen.) Camatcho 55' Hasan Mouath 66' (pen.) Martínez 77' |

Abdullah al-Faisal Stadium, Jeddah
2008-04-27

| Al Shabab | 3 – 1 | Al-Ahli |
|---|---|---|
| Nasser Al-Shamrani 44' (pen.) Faisal Al-Sultan 47' Badr Al-Haqbani 55' | | Abdulilah Hawsawi 85' |

King Fahd Stadium, Riyadh

=== Semi-final ===
2008-05-02

| Al Hazm | 4 – 2 | Al Shabab |
|---|---|---|
| Saeed Al-Shon 26' Saoud Al-Khaebary 61' Saoud Al-Khaebary 75' Abdullah Ghazy 87' | | Nasser Al-Shamrani 53' Nasser Al-Shamrani 72' |

Prince Mohamed bin Jalawi, Ar Rass
2008-05-10

| Al Shabab | 5 – 0 | Al Hazm |
|---|---|---|
| Faisal Al-Sultan 11' Nasser Al-Shamrani 36' Abdoh Otaif 37' Faisal Al-Sultan 47' Martínez 87' |

King Fahd Stadium, Riyadh

=== Final ===
2008-05-14

| Ittihad | 1 – 3 | Al Shabab |
|---|---|---|
| Talal Al-Meshal 89' | | Nasser Al-Shamrani 10' Abdullah Al-Shuhail 82' Camatcho 93' |

King Fahd Stadium, Riyadh
