= Samoan =

Samoan may refer to:

- Something of, from, or related to the Samoan Islands, an archipelago in the South Pacific Ocean
  - Something of, from, or related to Samoa, a country encompassing the western part of the Samoan Islands
  - Something of, from, or related to American Samoa, a United States territory in the Samoan Islands
- Samoan language, the native language of the Samoan Islands
- Samoans, a Polynesian ethnic group of the Samoan Islands

== See also ==
- Samaon (name)
