= Nawaf Al-Ghulaimish =

Saudi Arabian footballer (born 2005)

Personal information
- Full name: Nawaf Abdullah Al-Ghulaimish
- Date of birth: 2 May 2005 (age 21)
- Place of birth: Riyadh, Saudi Arabia
- Height: 1.78 m (5 ft 10 in)
- Position: Right-back

Team information
- Current team: Neom
- Number: 66

Youth career
- –2024: Al-Shabab

Senior career*
Years	Team	Apps	(Gls)
2024–2026	Al-Shabab	17	(0)
2026–	Neom	0	(0)

International career
2023–	Saudi Arabia U20	12	(0)
- * Club domestic league appearances and goals as of 3 January 2026

Nawaf Al-Ghulaimish (Arabic: نواف القليميش; born 2 May 2005) is a Saudi Arabian professional football player who plays as a right-back for Neom and the Saudi Arabia U20.

== Club career ==
Al-Ghulaimish started his career at the youth academy of Al-Shabab. On 29 July 2024, renewed his contract with club. On 3 February 2026, Al-Ghulaimish joined Pro League side Neom.

== International career ==
He was called up to the Saudi Arabia U20 to participate in 2025 FIFA U-20 World Cup.
