= Yemeni Third Division =

Second tier of the football league system in Yemen

- Founded: 1990
- Country: Yemen
- Number of clubs: 258
- Level on pyramid: 3
- Promotion to: Yemeni Second Division
- Domestic cup: President Cup

The Yemeni Third Division is the third-tier league of football in Yemen, operating under the auspices of the Yemen Football Association. It was founded in 1990, following the unification.

== Format ==
As of 2010, 258 clubs have competed in the league. They are organized into groups representing their governorates. The winners of each 16 governorate leagues enter into a play-off system to determine overall league winners.

== Promotion/relegation ==
The league's top four clubs are promoted to the Yemeni Second Division, while the four poorest performing are relegated to the Third Division. At times, clubs boycotted the league system for suspending the promotion and relegation system. Prior to the 2025 season, a play-off tournament was held to determine both the 2nd and 3rd division participants.

== See also ==
- Football in Yemen
