= 2023–24 Yemeni League =

Yemeni League
- Season: 2023–24
- Champions: Al-Ahli San'a
- Relegated: Samaon; Al-Sha'ab Ibb
- Matches: 65
- Goals: 161 (2.48 per match)

The 2023–24 Yemeni League was the 25th instance of the Yemeni League football association. Ahli Sana'a Club won the league after beating Al-Tadamun Hadramaut in the final.

== Clubs ==
Yemeni League
| Club | Location | Stadium | Capacity |
|---|---|---|---|
| Al-Saqr Ta'izz | Ta'izz | Al Shohada Stadium | 32,000 |
| Salam Al-Garfa | Al Garfa | Al Garfa Stadium | |
| Al-Sha'ab Hadramaut | Mukalla | Baradem Mukalla Stadium | 50,000 |
| Al-Ahli San'a | San'a | Ali Muhesen Stadium | 25,000 |
| Al-Tali'aa Taizz | Ta'izz | Al Shohada Stadium | 32,000 |
| Al-Oruba Zabid | Zabid | Ali Muhesen Stadium | 25,000 |
| Al-Yarmuk Al-Rawda | San'a | Ali Muhesen Stadium | 25,000 |
| Al-Wahda San'a | San'a | Ali Muhesen Stadium | 25,000 |
| Al Sha'ab Ibb | Ibb | 22 May Stadium | 40,000 |
| Al-Hilal Hudayda | Al Hudaydah | Al Ulufi Stadium | 2,000 |
| Fahman SCC | Mudiyah | Mudiyah Stadium | |
| Al-Tadamun Hadramaut | Mukalla | Baradem Mukalla Stadium | 50,000 |
| Al-Ittihad Ibb | Ibb | May 22 Stadium | 40,000 |
| Samaon | San'a | Ali Muhesen Stadium | 25,000 |

== League table ==
Group A

| Pos | Team | Pld | W | D | L | GF | GA | GD | Pts | Qualification or relegation |
|---|---|---|---|---|---|---|---|---|---|---|
| 1 | Al-Ahli San'a | 10 | 8 | 1 | 1 | 21 | 2 | +19 | 25 | Advanced to knockout stage |
| 2 | Al-Tadamun Hadramaut | 10 | 5 | 3 | 2 | 14 | 10 | +4 | 18 | Advanced to knockout stage |
| 3 | Al-Oruba | 10 | 3 | 4 | 3 | 13 | 10 | +3 | 13 | |
| 4 | Al-Ittihad SCC | 10 | 3 | 2 | 5 | 8 | 12 | −4 | 11 | |
| 5 | Al-Hilal Hudayda | 10 | 2 | 5 | 3 | 5 | 14 | −9 | 11 | |
| 6 | Samaon | 10 | 1 | 1 | 8 | 6 | 19 | −13 | 4 | Relegated |
| 7 | Al-Saqr | 0 | 0 | 0 | 0 | 0 | 0 | 0 | 0 | Withdrew and relegated |

Rules for classification: 1) Points; 2) Goal difference; 3) Goals scored;

Group B

| Pos | Team | Pld | W | D | L | GF | GA | GD | Pts | Qualification or relegation |
|---|---|---|---|---|---|---|---|---|---|---|
| 1 | Al-Wehda SCC | 10 | 6 | 3 | 1 | 13 | 8 | +5 | 21 | Advanced to knockout stage |
| 2 | Al-Sha'ab Hadramaut | 10 | 5 | 3 | 2 | 16 | 10 | +6 | 18 | Advanced to knockout stage |
| 3 | Fahman SCC | 10 | 4 | 2 | 4 | 17 | 12 | +5 | 14 | |
| 4 | Salam Al-Garfa | 10 | 3 | 2 | 5 | 13 | 13 | 0 | 11 | |
| 5 | Al-Yarmuk Al-Rawda | 10 | 3 | 2 | 5 | 17 | 7 | +10 | 11 | |
| 6 | Al-Sha'ab Ibb | 10 | 2 | 2 | 6 | 13 | 19 | −6 | 8 | Relegated |
| 7 | Al-Tali'aa Taizz | 0 | 0 | 0 | 0 | 0 | 0 | 0 | 0 | Withdrew and relegated |

Rules for classification: 1) Points; 2) Goal difference; 3) Goals scored;

== Knockout stage ==
Semi-finals
Al-Sha'ab Hadramaut | 0 | 0 | 0
Al-Ahli Sana'a | 0 | 1 | 1
Al-Tadamun Hadramaut | 0 | 1 | 1
Al-Wehda San'a | 0 | 1 | 1

Final
Al-Ahli Sana'a | 2
Al-Tadamun Hadramaut | 0
Third place
Al-Sha'ab Hadramaut | 0 (2)
Al-Wehda San'a | 0 (4)

== Attendances ==
| # | Club | Average |
|---|---|---|
| 1 | Al-Ahli Sana'a | 1,164 |
| 2 | Al-Sha'ab Ibb | 962 |
| 3 | Al-Ittihad SCC | 842 |
| 4 | Al-Tadamun Hadhramaut | 618 |
| 5 | Al-Sha'ab Hadhramaut | 571 |
| 6 | Al-Tali'aa Ta'izz | 533 |
| 7 | Al-Oruba Zabid | 492 |
| 8 | Al-Wahda Sana'a | 451 |
| 9 | Al-Yarmuk Al-Rawda | 403 |
| 10 | Al-Saqr Ta'izz | 381 |
| 11 | Samaon FC | 337 |
| 12 | Al-Hilal Al-Sahili | 194 |
| 13 | Salam Al-Garfa | 160 |
| 14 | Fahman SCC | 145 |
