= Al-Tadamun Hadramaut =

Association football club in Yemen

Al-Tadamun Hadhramaut نادي تضامن حضرموت
- Full name: Al-Tadamun Hadhramaut Sports, Cultural and Social Club نادي تضامن حضرموت الرياضي الثقافي الاجتماعي
- Founded: 1959; 67 years ago
- Stadium: Baradem Mukalla Stadium
- Capacity: 15,000
- Manager: (Saudi Arabia) Bandar Basarih
- League: Yemeni League
- 2023–24: 2nd

Al-Tadamun Hadhramaut SCSC is a professional football club from Mukalla, Hadhramaut Governorate, Yemen currently competing in the Yemeni League. Founded in 1959, Al-Tadamun is one of the oldest clubs in Yemen.

== History ==
Al-Tadamun Hadramaut was founded in 1959. The club was promoted back to the Yemeni League in 2023, following promotion from the Yemeni Second Division the previous season. The club clinched promotion to the top division with a 5–0 victory over khanfar Abyan SC on the penultimate matchday. That year, the club also advanced to the semi-finals of the 7th annual Liberation Cup celebrating the 24 April liberation of Mukalla following the Battle of Mukalla, ultimately being defeated by Al-Shaab. In 2025, the club won the same competition, defeating Al-Shaab 2–1 in the final to win the title.

In June 2025, it was announced that Al-Tadamun Hadramaut had been selected by the Yemen Football Association to be the nation's participant in the 2025–26 AGCFF Gulf Club Champions League. The team was selected as the runner-up of the latest edition of the Yemeni League. The association asked the club to participate to gain international experience for more Yemeni teams since the league winner, Ahli Sanaa Club, entered the tournament in the previous edition. The competition would mark the first time the club represented Yemen in international competition. In preparation for the tournament, the club imported several new recruits including Saudi manager Bandar Basarih and Burundi international Chancel Ndaye, among other foreign and domestic players.

Al-Tadamun's match against Al Shabab which ended in a 2–0 victory for Al-Tadamun

Al-Tadamun played its first ever competitive continental fixture, a loss 5–0 against Al-Rayyan SC of Qatar on 1 October 2025 to open the competition. In its next match, the Yemenis defeated Al Shabab 2–0. With the victory, Al-Tadamun became the first Yemeni club to defeat a club from Saudi Arabia in an official competition. Al-Tadamun won the match despite being down to ten men, with both of the team's goals scored by Mamdouh Bin Ajaj. After the first three matches of the tournament, the club had four points and sat second in Group B behind Al-Rayyan SC with a chance to qualify for the knockout stages.

== Stadium ==
The club plays at the 15,000-seat Baradem Mukalla Stadium. The Abdullah Bin Suror Memorial Stadium is owned by the club and located at its training facility. The venue underwent significant renovations in 2022 and hosts the club's unofficial and youth matches.

== Honours ==
Yemeni League

Runners-Up (1): 2023–24

== International competition ==
Scores list Al-Tadamun Hadramaut ’s goal tally first.

Season	Competition	Round	Opponent	Home	Away	Aggregate
2025–26	AGCFF Gulf Club Champions League	Group Stage	(Qatar) Al-Rayyan	0–5	0–3	4th out of 4
2025–26	AGCFF Gulf Club Champions League	Group Stage	(Saudi Arabia) Al Shabab	2–0	0–13	4th out of 4
2025–26	AGCFF Gulf Club Champions League	Group Stage	(Oman) Al-Nahda	1–1	0–1	4th out of 4
