= Faisal Al-Subiani =

Saudi Arabian footballer

Personal information
- Full name: Faisal Ismail Al-Subiani
- Date of birth: July 7, 2003 (age 23)
- Place of birth: Jeddah, Saudi Arabia
- Height: 1.72 m (5 ft 8 in)
- Position: Midfielder

Team information
- Current team: Abha (on loan from Al-Shabab)
- Number: 6

Youth career
- Al-Ahli

Senior career*
| Years | Team | Apps | (Gls) |
| 2023–2025 | Al-Ahli | 0 | (0) |
| 2024–2025 | → Damac (loan) | 26 | (0) |
| 2025– | Al-Shabab | 15 | (0) |
| 2026– | → Abha (loan) | 5 | (1) |

International career
| 2024– | Saudi Arabia U23 | | |
- * Club domestic league appearances and goals as of 30 October 2026

Faisal Al-Subiani (Arabic: فيصل الصبياني; born 7 July 2003) is a Saudi Arabian professional footballer who plays as a midfielder for Saudi Pro League club Abha on loan from Al-Shabab.

== Club career ==
Al-Subiani started his career at Al-Ahli and was promoted to the first team during the 2023–24 season. On 2 September 2024, Al-Subiani joined Pro League side Damac on loan. On 13 September 2024, Al-Subiani made his Pro League debut for Damac, coming on as a substitute in the 70th minute in the 3–1 win against Al-Okhdood. He made his first start for the club on 9 November 2024 in the 3–2 win against Al-Wehda.

On 20 August 2025, Al-Subiani joined Al-Shabab on a three-year deal.

== Career statistics ==
=== Club ===
As of 31 May 2025.

| Club | Season | League | | | Cup | | Continental | | Other | | Total | |
| Club | Season | Division | Apps | Goals | Apps | Goals | Apps | Goals | Apps | Goals | Apps | Goals |
|---|---|---|---|---|---|---|---|---|---|---|---|---|
| Al-Ahli | 2023–24 | Pro League | 0 | 0 | 0 | 0 | – | | – | | 0 | 0 |
| Damac (loan) | 2024–25 | Pro League | 26 | 0 | 0 | 0 | – | | – | | 26 | 0 |
| Al-Shabab | 2025–26 | Pro League | 0 | 0 | 0 | 0 | – | | – | | 0 | 0 |
| Career total | | | 26 | 0 | 0 | 0 | 0 | 0 | 0 | 0 | 26 | 0 |
