= Naji Majrashi =

Saudi Arabian footballer (born 1982)

Personal information
- Full name: Naji Mohammed Majrashi
- Date of birth: 2 February 1982 (age 44)
- Place of birth: Saudi Arabia
- Height: 1.65 m (5 ft 5 in)
- Position: Striker

Senior career*
Years	Team	Apps	(Gls)
2003–2011	Al-Shabab		
2011	→ Ulsan Hyundai (loan)	7	(0)
2011–2012	Al-Raed	9	(1)
2012–2013	Al-Riyadh SC		

International career^{‡}
2004–2005	Saudi Arabia	7	(2)
- * Club domestic league appearances and goals as of 15 December 2011 ‡ National team caps and goals as of 15 October 2005

Naji Majrashi (born 2 February 1982) is a football striker from Saudi Arabia.

He also played for the Saudi Arabia junior team at the 2003 FIFA World Youth Championship.
