= Yemeni Second Division =

Second tier of the football league system in Yemen

- Founded: 1990
- Country: Yemen
- Number of clubs: 20
- Level on pyramid: 2
- Promotion to: Yemeni League
- Relegation to: Yemeni Third Division
- Domestic cup: President Cup

The Yemeni Second Division is the second-tier league of football in Yemen, operating under the auspices of the Yemen Football Association. The league was founded in 1990, following the Yemeni unification.

== Format ==
Twenty cubs typically compete in the league as of 2010, following FIFA requirements. In 2013, the league switched to a group-style format with two groups of ten clubs, with matches played at centralized locations. Previously, the league was played in a home-and-away style. By 2023, the league returned to the home-and-away format.

== Promotion/relegation ==
The league's top four clubs are promoted to the Yemeni League, while the four poorest performing are relegated to the Yemeni Third Division. At times, including prior to the 2023 season, clubs boycotted the league system for suspending the promotion and relegation system. Prior to the 2025 season, a play-off tournament was held to determine 2nd and 3rd division clubs.

== See also ==
- Football in Yemen
