= Mahmud Abunada =

Qatari footballer (born 2000)

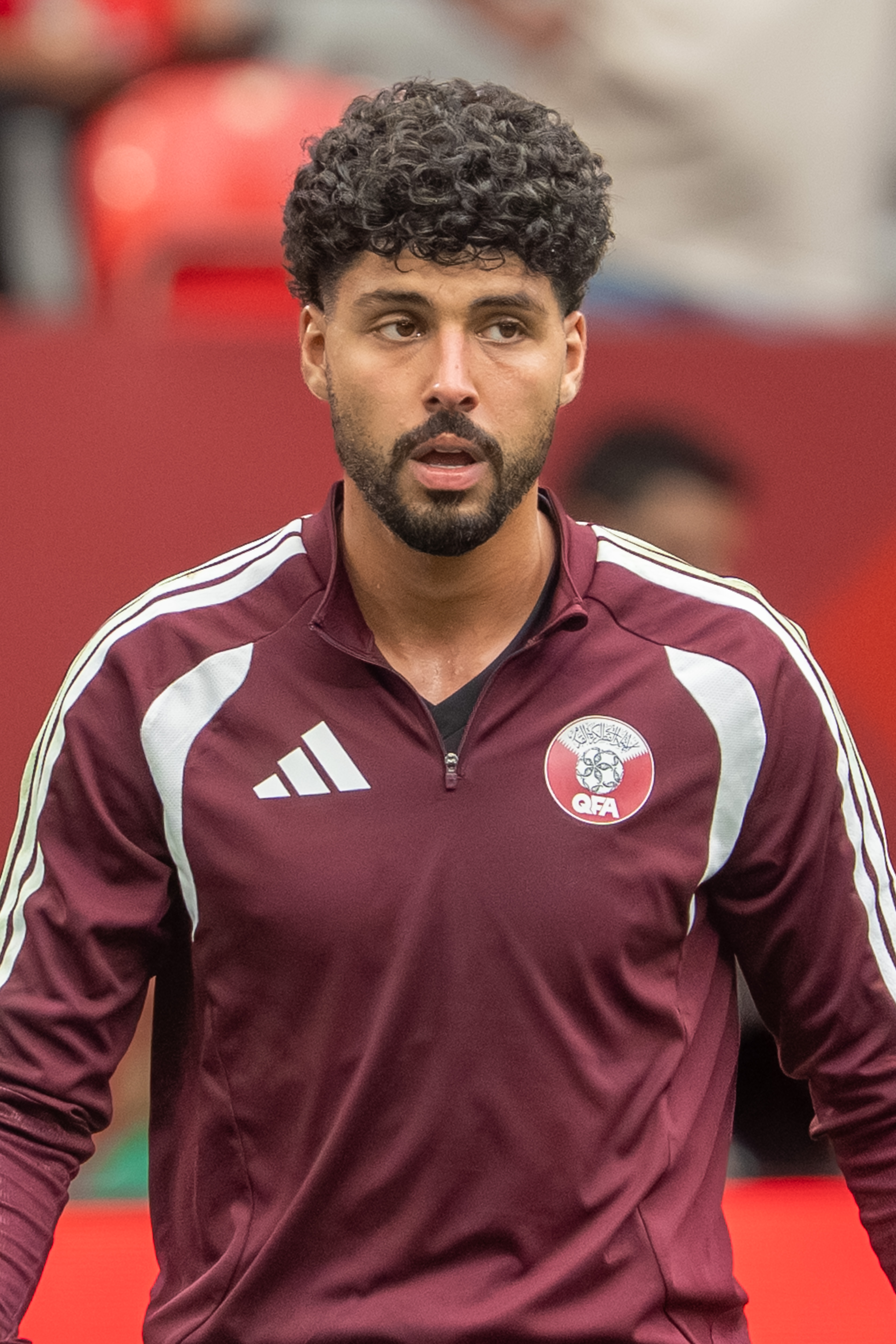
- Abunada with Qatar in 2026

Personal information
- Full name: Mahmud Ibrahim Abunada
- Date of birth: 5 February 2000 (age 26)
- Place of birth: Doha, Qatar
- Height: 1.86 m (6 ft 1 in)
- Position: Goalkeeper

Team information
- Current team: Al-Rayyan
- Number: 57

Youth career
- –2019: Al-Arabi

Senior career*
Years	Team	Apps	(Gls)
2019–2025	Al-Arabi	64	(0)
2025–	Al-Rayyan	20	(0)

International career^{‡}
2025–	Qatar	9	(0)
- * Club domestic league appearances and goals as of 10 May 2026 ‡ National team caps and goals as of 24 June 2026

Mahmud Ibrahim Abunada (Arabic: محمود إبراهيم أبو ندى; born 5 February 2000) is a Qatari professional footballer who plays as a goalkeeper for Qatari Stars League club Al-Rayyan and the Qatar national team.

== Club career ==
Abunada started his career in the youth team of Al-Arabi. On 14 February 2019, he made his professional debut for Al-Arabi against Al-Rayyan in the Pro League.

In June 2025, he signed a five-year deal with Al-Rayyan SC.

== International career ==
Abunada plays for the Qatar national team, which has qualified for the 2026 FIFA World Cup. He was selected for the 26-man squad for the 2026 FIFA World Cup on 27 May 2026.

On 13 June 2026, Abunada was named Player of the Match for his performance in a 1-1 draw against Switzerland in Qatar's opening match of the World Cup.

== Personal life ==
Abunada was born in Qatar and is of Palestinian descent, holding dual Qatari and Palestinian citizenship. After qualifying to the 2026 FIFA World Cup, Abunada donated to build a hospital in the Gaza Strip in Palestine to help them recover from the Gaza war.

== Honours ==
Al-Rayyan

- QSL Cup: 2025–26
- AGCFF Gulf Club Champions League: 2025–26
- Amir of Qatar Cup runner-up: 2025

Individual

- Qatar Stars League Team of the Year: 2025–26
- Qatar Stars League Best Goalkeeper: 2025–26
- AGCFF Gulf Club Champions League Best Goalkeeper: 2025–26
- 2026 FIFA World Cup Superior Player of the Match award: (Qatar x Switzerland)
