= Samaon =

Samaon can be a masculine given name or a surname. Notable people with the name include:

- Samaon Sulaiman
- Chatin Singh Samaon, Indian politician

== See also ==
- Samoan (disambiguation)
