= Ibrahim Jamal (footballer, born 1988) =

Egyptian footballer

Ibrahim Jamal إِبْرَاهِيم جَمَال
Personal information
- Full name: Ibrahim Jamal Abdelfattah
- Date of birth: 16 August 1988 (age 38)
- Place of birth: Egypt
- Position: Midfielder

Senior career*
Years	Team	Apps	(Gls)
2015–2022	Qatar		
2020–2021	→ Muaither (loan)		
2021–2022	→ Al-Shahania (loan)		
- * Club domestic league appearances and goals

Ibrahim Jamal Abdelfattah (Arabic: إِبْرَاهِيم جَمَال عَبْد الْفَتَّاح; born 16 August 1988) is an Egyptian former footballer who played as a midfielder.

== Career ==
Ibrahim Jamal started his career at Qatar SC. On 30 September 2017, Ibrahim Jamal made his professional debut for Qatar SC against Al Kharaitiyat in the Pro League. He landed with Qatar SC from the Qatar Stars League to the Qatari Second Division in 2015-16 season. And ended up with Qatar SC from the Qatari Second Division to the Qatar Stars League in the 2016-17 season.
