= Baradem Mukalla Stadium =

Olympic Stadium in Mukalla, Yemen

Coordinates: 14°32′53″N 49°07′18″E

Baradem Stadium
- Baradem
- Interactive map of Baradem Stadium
- Location: Mukalla, Hadhramaut, Yemen
- Capacity: 15,000
- Surface: grass

Baradem Mukalla Stadium, also known as the Al-Faqeed Baradem Stadium, is a multi-use stadium in Mukalla, Hadhramaut, Yemen with grass surface. It is used mostly for football matches and serves as the home stadium of Al-Sha'ab Hadhramaut and Al-Tadamun Hadramaut. The stadium holds 15,000 people.
