= Al Shabab Club =

Association football club in Riyadh, Saudi Arabia

Al-Shabab SFC
- Full name: Al-Shabab Saudi Football Club
- Nicknames: Al-Laith (White Lions)
- Founded: 1947; 79 years ago
- Ground: Al-Shabab Club Stadium, Riyadh
- Capacity: 13,537
- Chairman: Abdulaziz Al-Malik
- Head coach: Thomas Letsch
- League: Saudi Pro League
- 2025–26: Pro League, 13th of 18
- Website: alshabab-sc.sa
Home colours	Away colours

Al Shabab active departments
Football (men's)	Football (women's)

Al-Shabab Saudi Football Club also known as Al-Shabab (Arabic: نادي الشباب لكرة القدم, romanized: nādī al-shabaab li-kurat al-qadam, lit. 'The Youth Football Club') is a Saudi Arabian professional football club based in Riyadh that competes in the Saudi Pro League. Founded in 1947 as Shabab Al-Riyadh (شباب الرياض; lit. 'Riyadh Youth'), it was renamed Al-Shabab in 1967.

The club earned its name, "Shabab," meaning "youth" in Arabic, due to its emphasis on developing young players at its inception. Unlike its rivals, which primarily featured senior players, the club focused on nurturing youth talent. This distinction persisted for many years, becoming a defining characteristic of the club. As a result, the club became renowned for its commitment to youth development.

== History ==
Al Shabab was the first football club in Riyadh. The club began before 1947, with many conflicts before with its numerous members, but it was settled in 1947 and Abdulrahman Bin Saeed was the president. Five years later, Al Shabab won its first tournament beating Sakit Al Hadeed (Railway Club) in Riyadh. In 1955 Al Shabab beat the Military College to win the King Saud Cup. Two years passed, and a new conflict arose in 1957. The player, Saleh Jaber, was assigned captain, but then was fired, and the new captain was Ahmed Lmfoon. This did not please some members of the club. Soon the conflict was impossible to solve, and Abdulrahman Bin Saeed and some members, left Al Shabab and took the best players that played for the club back then in an injustice way leaving Al Shabab to a chaos, The club stopped for half a year due to financial weakness, a new football club was born from the conflicts and separation with Abdulrahman Bin Saeed as the president which is the club known today as Al-Hilal. Then in the beginning of 1959 another problem began, Abdullah Bin Ahmed, the president then, was all alone taking care of the club. He could not take the pressure of handling the club alone, and decided to take a vacation abroad. Before traveling, he disbanded the first team, and most of the players signed for other clubs mainly Al-Ahli and Al-Hilal. What was left was the youth team, and the player Abdulrahman Bin Ahmed decided to take care of the youth, and from that they got there name Shabab Al Riyadh which means Riyadh's youth. Soon Abdullah Bin Ahmed returned, and many members returned and supported the club. Then Abdullah Bin Ahmed announced the return of forming the first team, and some players returned, but some stayed at Al-Ahli and Al-Hilal. Also in 1959 was the formation of the Saudi Football Federation, and all football clubs were announced official. In 1960 in the first official tournament called King Saud Cup for the Central Province, Al Shabab faced Al Hilal in their first official games between the two, and won 3–0 to win their first cup.

In the 1960s, everyone wanted to play and be part of the club, and after the request of Al Najmah FC and Al Marekh in 1967, they were united as one club and changed their name from Shabab Riyadh, to simply Al Shabab. The colors of the team were at first white and green, then they were changed after the unification to orange and blue, but in 1977 it was changed to white, gray, and black, the current colors. In 1975 Al Shabab was relegated to 1st Division, but the following season it was able to gain 1st place and came back to the Premier League in 1976. In 1993, Al Shabab became the first club in Saudi Arabia to win 3 premier leagues in a row. In 2007, Al Shabab became the first club in Saudi Arabia to build projects to increase the club's revenue, and began a 200 million dollar project which contains a 5 star hotel, and a shopping mall. During a visit to the club in January 2008, Al Shabab's main supporter, Khalid bin Sultan, announced the launch of two new projects, Al Laith TV Channel, and Al Shabab Museum.

== Honours ==
=== Domestic ===
- Saudi Pro League
  - Champions (6): 1990–91, 1991–92, 1992–93, 2003–04, 2005–06, 2011–12
    - Runners-up (6): 1981–82, 1984–85, 1988–89, 1997–98, 2004–05, 2020–21
- King's Cup
  - Champions (3): 2008, 2009, 2014
    - Runners-up: 2013
- Saudi Super Cup
  - Champion: 2014
- Crown Prince's Cup
  - Champion (3): 1993, 1996, 1999
    - Runners-up (4): 1992, 1994, 2000, 2009
- Saudi Federation cup
  - Champion (4): 1988, 1989, 2009, 2010
- Saudi First Division League (tier 2)
  - Champions: 1978–79

=== Continental ===
- Asian Club Championship
  - Runner up: 1992–93
- Asian Cup Winners' Cup
  - Champions: 2001

=== Regional ===
- Arab Club Champions Cup
  - Champions (2): 1992, 1999
- Arab Super Cup
  - Champions (2): 1996, 2001
- Gulf Club Champions Cup
  - Champions (2): 1993, 1994

== Records ==
- First Saudi club to win three Saudi Premier League in a row (1991, 1992, and 1993).
- First Saudi club to win the professional and new Saudi Premier League, in 1991.
- Largest margin win was against Al Shoalah during a friendly tournament in 2007, 8–0. Largest margin win in an official game was against Al-Ta'ee in the Saudi Premier League in 2003, 7–0. Largest margin win against a high-ranked club was 6–1 against Al Nassr in the Saudi Premier League 2004.

== Players ==
As of 27 July 2026

Note: Flags indicate national team as defined under FIFA eligibility rules; some limited exceptions apply. Players may hold more than one non-FIFA nationality.

No.	Pos.	Nation	Player
1	GK	SEN	Mory Diaw
2	DF	KSA	Mohammed Al-Shwirekh
3	DF	SEN	Mamadou Barry (on loan from Saint-Gilloise)
4	DF	CRO	Tin Jedvaj
5	DF	KSA	Ali Makki
6	MF	KSA	Awad Al-Nashri
8	MF	ENG	Josh Brownhill
9	FW	COL	Roger Martínez
10	MF	BEL	Yannick Carrasco (captain)
11	MF	POR	Daniel Podence
12	DF	KSA	Sultan Al-Anize
15	DF	SRB	Lazar Stojanovic (on loan from Čukarički)
17	DF	KSA	Mohammed Al-Thani
18	MF	GHA	Thomas Partey
21	DF	KSA	Dhari Al-Anazi
22	MF	KSA	Hammam Al-Hammami
23	GK	KSA	Abdulaziz Al-Awairdhi
24	MF	KSA	Abdulrahman Al-Aboud
26	DF	KSA	Amjad Haraj
27	DF	KSA	Abdullah Hawsawi (on loan from Al-Najma)

No.	Pos.	Nation	Player
29	MF	FRA	Yacine Adli
33	GK	KSA	Mohammed Al-Mahasneh
37	FW	KSA	Abdullah Matuq
38	DF	KSA	Mohammed Harbush
40	MF	KSA	Ali Al-Asmari (on loan from Neom)
44	DF	KSA	Awaji Olwani
46	MF	KSA	Emad Qaysi
49	FW	BRA	Ricardo Mathias (on loan from Al-Ahli)
55	DF	KSA	Ali Al-Bulaihi
56	DF	KSA	Yazeed Al-Mehallel
60	GK	KSA	Mohammed Al-Otaibi
66	MF	KSA	Muqrin Abanumay
72	DF	KSA	Nasser Al-Bishi
74	MF	KSA	Abdulaziz Al-Hadhood
97	FW	KSA	Murad Khadhari
99	FW	KSA	Hamad Al-Khorayef
—	MF	KSA	Talal Al-Shubili (on loan from Al-Riyadh)
—	MF	YEM	Adel Abbas
—	FW	YEM	Abdulaziz Masnom

=== Out on loan ===
Note: Flags indicate national team as defined under FIFA eligibility rules; some limited exceptions apply. Players may hold more than one non-FIFA nationality.

No.	Pos.	Nation	Player
16	DF	KSA	Hussain Al-Sibyani (at Al-Diriyah)
19	FW	KSA	Majed Abdullah (at Al Wehda)
20	MF	KSA	Basil Al-Sayyali (at Abha)

No.	Pos.	Nation	Player
94	DF	KSA	Mubarak Al-Rajeh (at Al-Najma)
—	MF	KSA	Faisal Al-Subiani (at Abha)

== Management ==
=== Current board of directors and Administrators ===
Office	Name
President	Khalid AlBaltan
Vice-president	Kholaif AlHweshan
Member of the Board, Investment Officer	
Member of the Board, Secretary-General	
Member of the Board, Director of the Media Center	Ahmad AlMasoud
CEO	Pat Janssen

== Current technical staff ==
Position	Name
Head coach	(Germany) Thomas Letsch
Assistant coach	(Germany) Alexander Zickler
Assistant coach	(Germany) Kai Hesse
Goalkeeper coach	(Germany) Uwe Gospodarek
Fitness coach	(Greece) Stergios Fotopoulos
Conditioning coach	(England) Oliver Bartlett
Club doctor	(Mexico) Misael Rivas (Portugal) Ângelo Pinto de Bastos
Physiotherapist	(Saudi Arabia) Salman Al-Khamis
U 23 team coach	(Saudi Arabia) Turki Al-Gabr
U 20 team coach	(Saudi Arabia) Waleed Al-Muslim
U 17 team coach	(Saudi Arabia) Omar Islam
Sporting director	(Belgium) Olivier Renard (Saudi Arabia) Naif Al-Anazi

== Recent seasons ==
The table below chronicles the achievements of Al Shabab in various competitions since 2000.

Year	Division	Position	Crown Prince Cup	King Cup	ACL
2000–01	Premier League	7th	Semi-final	–	–
2001–02	Premier League	9th	Quarter-final	–	–
2002–03	Premier League	6th	Quarter-final	–	–
2003–04	Premier League	1st	Quarter-final	–	–
2004–05	Premier League	2nd	Quarter-final	Group stage	–
2005–06	Premier League	1st	Quarter-final	Quarter-final	–
2006–07	Premier League	4th	Quarter-final	Group stage	–
2007–08	Premier League	3rd	Semi-final	Champion	–
2008–09	Pro League	4th	Runners-up	Champion	Round of 16
2009–10	Pro League	4th	Semi-final	Semi-final	Semi-final
2010–11	Pro League	4th	Round of 16	Quarter-final	Round of 16
2011–12	Pro League	4th	Quarter-final	Quarter-final	–
2012–13	Pro League	3rd	Round of 16	Runners-up	Quarter-finals
2013–14	Pro League	4th	Semi-final	Champion	Round of 16
2014–15	Pro League	5th	Round of 16	Quarter-final	Group stage
2015–16	Pro League	6th	Semi-final	Round of 16	–
2016–17	Pro League	6th	Quarter-finals	Round of 32	–
2017–18	Pro League	10th	–	Quarter-finals	–
2018–19	Pro League	5th	–	Round of 16	–
2019–20	Pro League	7th	–	Round of 32	–
2020–21	Pro League	2nd	–	Round of 16	–
2021–22	Pro League	4th	–	Round of 16	Quarter-final
2022–23	Pro League	4th	–	Semi-final	Round of 16
2023–24	Pro League	8th			
2024–25	Pro League				
2025–26	Pro League				

== Managers ==
(United Arab Republic) Mahmoud Abou-Regaila (1970–71); (Egypt) Saleh El Wahsh (1977–78); (Brazil) Luiz Felipe Scolari (1984–85); (Brazil) Jair Pereira (1986); (Brazil) Joubert (1987); (Brazil) Lori Sandri (1989); (Brazil) Paulo Campos (1990–91); (Brazil) Lori Sandri (1992); (Brazil) Geninho (1993); (Brazil) Ivo Wortmann (1994); (Ukraine) Yuriy Sevastyanenko (1995–96); (France) Jean Fernandez (1996–97); (Brazil) Oscar (1998); (Brazil) João Alves (1998–99); (Brazil) João Francisco (1999); (Brazil) Arthur Bernardes (2001–02); (Brazil) Zé Mário (1 July 2004 – 30 June 2006); (Argentina) Daniel Romeo (2005–06); (Tunisia) Ahmed Alajlani (2006); (Portugal) Humberto Coelho (2006–07); (Portugal) José Morais (2007); (Argentina) Enzo Trossero (1 July 2007–08); (Argentina) Nery Pumpido (1 July 2008 – 31 December 2008); (Argentina) Enzo Trossero (2008 – 30 June 2009); (Portugal) Jaime Pacheco (13 July 2009 – 15 April 2010); (Brazil) Edgar Ferreira (interim); (Uruguay) Jorge Fossati (1 July 2010 – 31 December 2010); (Argentina) Enzo Trossero (1 January 2011 – 30 June 2011)	(Belgium) Michel Preud'homme (1 July 2011 – 19 September 2013); (Belgium) Emilio Ferrera (20 September 2013 – 23 January 2014); (Tunisia) Ammar Souayah (interim); (Portugal) José Morais (6 June 2014–14); (Germany) Reinhard Stumpf (2014–15); (Portugal) Jaime Pacheco (2015); (Egypt) Adel Abdulrahman (interim); (Uruguay) Álvaro Gutiérrez (2015 – 3 January 2016); (Tunisia) Fathi Al-Jabal (January 2016 – June 2016); (Saudi Arabia) Sami Al-Jaber (June 2016 – September 2017); (Uruguay) José Daniel Carreño (September 2017 – March 2018); (Saudi Arabia) Khalid Al-Koroni (interim); (Romania) Marius Șumudică (June 2018 – May 2019); (Argentina) Jorge Almirón (June 2019 – December 2019); (Spain) Luis García (December 2019 – July 2020); (Portugal) Pedro Caixinha (July 2020 – January 2021); (Spain) Carlos Inarejos (January 2021 – May 2021); (Brazil) Péricles Chamusca (July 2021 – March 2022); (Romania) Marius Șumudică (March 2022 – June 2022); (Spain) Vicente Moreno (July 2022 – June 2023); (Netherlands) Marcel Keizer (July 2023 – Sept 2023); (Argentina) Juan Brown (interim); (Croatia) Igor Biscan (Oct 2023 – Dec 2023); (Saudi Arabia) Saad Al-Subaie (interim); (Portugal) Vítor Pereira (Feb 2024 – Dec 2024); (Turkey) Fatih Terim (Dec 2024 – Jul 2025); (Spain) Imanol Alguacil (Jul 2025 – Feb 2026); (Algeria) Noureddine Zekri (Feb 2026 – present)

== Asian competitions ==
=== Overview ===
As of 23 February 2023

Competition	Pld	W	D	L	GF	GA
AFC Champions League	76	41	13	23	116	80
Asian Club Championship	9	4	3	2	21	10
Asian Cup Winners' Cup	8	4	2	2	14	10
Asian Super Cup	2	0	1	1	3	4
TOTAL	95	49	19	28	154	104

=== Record by country ===
Country	Pld	W	D	L	GF	GA	GD	Win%
Bahrain	1	0	1	0	1	1	+0	0.00
China	1	1	0	0	4	2	+2	100.00
India	2	2	0	0	9	0	+9	100.00
Indonesia	1	1	0	0	3	0	+3	100.00
Iran	19	7	4	8	15	18	−3	36.84
Iraq	4	3	1	0	8	2	+6	75.00
Japan	3	0	3	0	3	3	+0	0.00
Jordan	2	1	1	0	3	2	+1	50.00
Kuwait	4	3	0	1	14	6	+8	75.00
Lebanon	2	1	0	1	3	3	+0	50.00
Qatar	16	9	3	4	25	17	+8	56.25
Saudi Arabia	3	0	0	3	2	6	−4	0.00
South Korea	8	2	1	5	9	16	−7	25.00
Syria	6	4	1	1	12	4	+8	66.67
United Arab Emirates	19	11	3	5	35	20	+15	57.89
Uzbekistan	5	4	1	0	11	4	+7	80.00

=== Asian record ===
==== Matches ====
Season	Competition	Round	Club	Home	Away	Aggregate
1992–93	Asian Club Championship	Quarter-finals	(Japan) Yomiuri	0–0		2nd
1992–93	Asian Club Championship	Quarter-finals	(Bahrain) Al-Muharraq	1–1		2nd
1992–93	Asian Club Championship	Quarter-finals	(Indonesia) Arseto	3–0		2nd
1992–93	Asian Club Championship	Semi-finals	(United Arab Emirates) Al-Wasl	2–2 (4–3 p)		2–2 (4–3 p)
1992–93	Asian Club Championship	Final	(Iran) PAS Tehran	0–1		0–1
1993–94	Asian Club Championship	First round	(Kuwait) Al-Arabi	5–2	7–1	12–3
1993–94	Asian Club Championship	Quarter-finals	–			Withdrew
1994–95	Asian Club Championship	Second round	(Lebanon) Al-Ansar	3–0	0–3	3–3 (4–5 p)
2000–01	Asian Cup Winners' Cup	Second round	(Syria) Hutteen	2–0	0–1	2–1
2000–01	Asian Cup Winners' Cup	Quarter-finals	(Jordan) Al-Wehdat	2–2	1–0	3–2
2000–01	Asian Cup Winners' Cup	Semi-finals	(Iran) Esteghlal	3–2		3–2
2000–01	Asian Cup Winners' Cup	Final	(China) Dalian Shide	4–2		4–2
2001	Asian Super Cup	Final	(South Korea) Suwon Samsung Bluewings	1–2	2–2	3–4
2001–02	Asian Cup Winners' Cup	Second round	(Qatar) Al-Sadd	0–0	2–3	2–3
2005	AFC Champions League	Group B	(Iran) Sepahan	1–1	0–1	3rd
2005	AFC Champions League	Group B	(Syria) Al-Wahda	3–1	2–1	3rd
2005	AFC Champions League	Group B	(United Arab Emirates) Al-Ain	1–0	0–3	3rd
2006	AFC Champions League	Group D	(Qatar) Al-Sadd	0–0	3–2	1st
2006	AFC Champions League	Group D	(Iraq) Al-Quwa Al-Jawiya	2–1	2–0	1st
2006	AFC Champions League	Group D	(Kuwait) Al-Arabi	2–0	0–3	1st
2006	AFC Champions League	Quarter-finals	(South Korea) Ulsan Hyundai Horang-i	0–1	0–6	0–7
2007	AFC Champions League	Group D	(United Arab Emirates) Al-Ain	2–0	2–0	2nd
2007	AFC Champions League	Group D	(Iran) Sepahan	0–1	0–1	2nd
2007	AFC Champions League	Group D	(Syria) Al-Ittihad	4–0	1–1	2nd
2009	AFC Champions League	Group B	(Qatar) Al-Gharafa	1–0	3–1	2nd
2009	AFC Champions League	Group B	(Iran) Persepolis	0–0	0–1	2nd
2009	AFC Champions League	Group B	(United Arab Emirates) Sharjah	5–0	3–1	2nd
2009	AFC Champions League	Round of 16	(Saudi Arabia) Al-Ittihad	–	1–2	1–2
2010	AFC Champions League	Group C	(Iran) Sepahan	1–1	0–1	1st
2010	AFC Champions League	Group C	(Uzbekistan) Pakhtakor	2–1	3–1	1st
2010	AFC Champions League	Group C	(United Arab Emirates) Al-Ain	3–2	1–2	1st
2010	AFC Champions League	Round of 16	(Iran) Esteghlal	3–2	–	3–2
2010	AFC Champions League	Quarter-finals	(South Korea) Jeonbuk Hyundai Motors	0–1	2–0	2–1
2010	AFC Champions League	Semi-finals	(South Korea) Seongnam Ilhwa Chunma	4–3	0–1	4–4 (a)
2011	AFC Champions League	Group D	(Qatar) Al-Rayyan	1–0	1–1	2nd
2011	AFC Champions League	Group D	(Iran) Zob Ahan	0–0	1–0	2nd
2011	AFC Champions League	Group D	(United Arab Emirates) Emirates	4–1	1–2	2nd
2011	AFC Champions League	Round of 16	(Qatar) Al-Sadd	–	0–1	0–1
2013	AFC Champions League	Group A	(Qatar) El Jaish	2–0	0–3	1st
2013	AFC Champions League	Group A	(United Arab Emirates) Al-Jazira	2–1	1–1	1st
2013	AFC Champions League	Group A	(Iran) Tractor Sazi	1–0	1–0	1st
2013	AFC Champions League	Round of 16	(Qatar) Al-Gharafa	3–0	2–1	5–1
2013	AFC Champions League	Quarter-finals	(Japan) Kashiwa Reysol	2–2	1–1	3–3 (a)
2014	AFC Champions League	Group A	(Iran) Esteghlal	2–1	1–0	1st
2014	AFC Champions League	Group A	(United Arab Emirates) Al-Jazira	1–3	2–1	1st
2014	AFC Champions League	Group A	(Qatar) Al-Rayyan	4–3	2–0	1st
2014	AFC Champions League	Round of 16	(Saudi Arabia) Al-Ittihad	1–3	0–1	1–4
2015	AFC Champions League	Group B	(United Arab Emirates) Al-Ain	0–1	0–0	4th
2015	AFC Champions League	Group B	(Uzbekistan) Pakhtakor	2–2	2–0	4th
2015	AFC Champions League	Group B	(Iran) Naft Tehran	0–3	1–2	4th
2022	AFC Champions League	Group B	(India) Mumbai City	6–0	3–0	1st
2022	AFC Champions League	Group B	(United Arab Emirates) Al-Jazira	3–0	2–0	1st
2022	AFC Champions League	Group B	(Iraq) Al-Quwa Al-Jawiya	3–0	1–1	1st
2022	AFC Champions League	Round of 16	(Uzbekistan) Nasaf Qarshi	2–0	–	2–0
2022	AFC Champions League	Quarter-finals	(Qatar) Al-Duhail	–	1–2	1–2

== AFC Club ranking ==
Rankings are calculated by the AFC

Rank	Club	Points
8	(Iran) Esteghlal	38.768
9	(United Arab Emirates) Al-Ain	67.608
10	(Saudi Arabia) Al Shabab	30.537
11	(Saudi Arabia) Al-Ittihad	90.000
12	(Uzbekistan) Bunyodkor	20.990

Rankings are calculated by the Football Alphabet

Rank	Club	Points
15	(China) Shandong Taishan	505.87
16	(Uzbekistan) Pakhtakor FK	480.24
17	(Saudi Arabia) Al Shabab	460.69
18	(United Arab Emirates) Al Wahda FC	459.74
19	(Iran) Sepahan SC	441.55

== See also ==
- List of football clubs in Saudi Arabia

Preceded by Shimizu S-Pulse (Japan)	Asian Cup Winners' Cup; Runner up: Dalian Shide; 2001	Succeeded by Al-Hilal (Saudi Arabia)
