= 2001 Bahraini Crown Prince Cup =

2001 Crown Prince Cup
Tournament details
- Host country: Bahrain
- Dates: 13 May – 24 May
- Teams: 8

Final positions
- Champions: Muharraq Club (1st title)

The 2001 Bahraini Crown Prince Cup was the 1st edition of the annual football cup tournament for the cup. It was played by the top 8 side of the 2000-01 Bahraini Premier League season

Muharraq Club won the knockout competition.

== Knockout Bracket ==
Quarter-final
(Bahrain) West Riffa	3
(Bahrain) East Riffa Club	0
(Bahrain) Busaiteen Club	1
Bahrain Club	3
(Bahrain) Al-Muharraq	3
(Bahrain) Al-Najma	0
(Bahrain) Al Ahli	1
(Bahrain) Issa Town	0

Semi-final
(Bahrain) West Riffa	2
Bahrain Club	1
(Bahrain) Al-Muharraq	3
(Bahrain) Al Ahli	1

Final
(Bahrain) West Riffa	4
(Bahrain) Al-Muharraq	5

Bahraini Crown Prince Cup
2001 Winners
Muharraq Club
1st Title
