= 2006 Bahraini Crown Prince Cup =

2006 Crown Prince Cup
Tournament details
- Host country: Bahrain
- Dates: 12 May – 21 May
- Teams: 4

Final positions
- Champions: Muharraq Club (2nd title)

The 2006 Bahraini Crown Prince Cup was the 6th edition of annual football cup tournament for the cup. This edition featured the top four sides from the Bahraini Premier League 2005-06 season.

== Bracket ==
Semi-finals
2006-05-12 - Manama
(Bahrain) Muharraq Club	2
(Bahrain) Al Najma Club	1
2006-05-13 - Manama
Bahrain Riffa Club	2
(Bahrain) Al-Ahli (Manama)	1

Final
2006-05-21 - Manama
(Bahrain) Muharraq Club	2
Bahrain Riffa Club	1

Source: RSSSF

Bahraini Crown Prince Cup
2006 Winners
Muharraq Club
2nd Title
