= 2007 Bahraini Crown Prince Cup =

2007 Crown Prince Cup
Tournament details
- Host country: Bahrain
- Dates: 24 May – 31 May
- Teams: 4

Final positions
- Champions: Muharraq Club (3rd title)

The 2007 Bahraini Crown Prince Cup was the 7th edition of the annual football cup tournament for the cup. This edition featured the top four sides from the Bahraini Premier League 2006-07 season.

== Bracket ==
Semi-finals
2007-05-24 - Manama
Bahrain Riffa Club	0
(Bahrain) Al Najma Club	2
2007-05-26 - Manama
(Bahrain) Muharraq Club	1
(Bahrain) Busaiteen Club	0

Final
2007-05-31 - Manama
(Bahrain) Al Najma Club	0
(Bahrain) Muharraq Club	1

Source: RSSSF

Bahraini Crown Prince Cup
2007 Winners
Muharraq Club
3rd Title
2nd in a row
