= 2011 Sultan Qaboos Cup =

Tournament details
- Country: Oman
- Teams: 36

Final positions
- Champions: Dhofar
- Runners-up: Al-Ittihad

Tournament statistics
- Matches played: 41
- Goals scored: 107 (2.61 per match)
- Top goal scorer(s): (Brazil) Lorinko (5 goals)

The 2011 Sultan Qaboos Cup was the 39th edition of the Sultan Qaboos Cup (Arabic: كأس السلطان قابوس), the premier knockout tournament for football teams in Oman.

The competition began on 16 September 2011 with the qualification round and concluded on 26 December 2011. Al-Oruba SC were the defending champions, having won their third title in 2010. Dhofar S.C.S.C. were crowned the champions of the 2011 Sultan Qaboos Cup when they defeated Al-Ittihad Club 1–0, winning the title for the record eighth time.

== Teams ==
This year the tournament had 36 teams. The winners qualified for the 2013 AFC Cup.

- Ahli Sidab Club (Sidab)
- Al-Bashaer Club
- Al-Hamra SC (Al-Hamra)
- Al-Ittihad Club (Salalah)
- Al-Khaboora SC (Al-Khaboora)
- Al-Musannah SC (Al-Musannah)
- Al-Mudhaibi SC (Mudhaibi)
- Al-Nahda Club (Al-Buraimi)
- Al-Nasr S.C.S.C. (Salalah)
- Al-Oruba SC (Sur)
- Al-Rustaq SC (Rustaq)
- Al-Salam SC (Sohar)
- Al-Seeb Club (Seeb)
- Al-Shabab Club (Seeb)
- Al-Suwaiq Club (Suwaiq
- Al-Tali'aa SC (Sur)
- Al-Wahda SC (Sur)
- Bahla Club (Bahla)
- Bidia SC (Bidiya)
- Bowsher Club (Bawshar)
- Dhofar S.C.S.C. (Salalah)
- Fanja SC (Fanja)
- Ibri Club (Ibri)
- Ja'lan SC (Jalan Bani Bu Ali)
- Madha SC (Madha)
- Majees SC (Majees)
- Mirbat SC (Mirbat)
- Muscat Club (Muscat)
- Nizwa Club (Nizwa)
- Oman Club (Muscat)
- Saham SC (Saham)
- Salalah SC (Salalah)
- Sohar SC (Sohar)
- Sur SC (Sur)
- Yanqul SC (Yanqul)

== Qualification round ==
8 teams played a knockout tie. 4 ties were played over one leg. The first match was played between Al-Hamra SC and Madha SC on 16 September 2011. Al-Hamra SC, Al-Rustaq SC, Nizwa Club, Bahla Club advanced to the Round of 32 after winning their respective ties.

16 September 2011	Al-Hamra	3–1	Madha
17:30 UTC+4

16 September 2011	Al-Wahda	1–2	Al-Rustaq
19:00 UTC+4

16 September 2011	Ibri	0–3	Nizwa
19:00 UTC+4

16 September 2011	Bahla	3–0	Ja'lan
20:00 UTC+4

== Round of 32 ==
32 teams played a knockout tie. 16 ties were played over one leg. The first match played was between Al-Mudhaibi SC and Majees SC on 29 September 2011. 16 teams advanced to the Round of 16.

29 September 2011	Al-Mudhaibi	3–0	Majees	Nizwa Sports Complex, Nizwa, Oman
17:15 UTC+4	Jasim 38'; Badar 54', 57'

29 September 2011	Al-Rustaq	0–1	Mirbat	Royal Oman Police Stadium, Muscat, Oman
20:00 UTC+4			Shakib Mohammed 38'

29 September 2011	Al-Ittihad	3–0	Ja’lan	Al-Saada Stadium, Salalah, Oman
20:15 UTC+4

29 September 2011	Saham	4–0	Nizwa
20:45 UTC+4

30 September 2011	Ahli Sidab	2–0	Al-Salam	Royal Oman Police Stadium, Muscat, Oman
17:10 UTC+4

30 September 2011	Sohar	3–2	Al-Shabab
17:15 UTC+4	Al-Farsi 17'; Al-Busaidi 37'; Al-Muqbali 50'		Ouganna 48'; Al-Siyabi 75' (pen.)

30 September 2011	Dhofar	3–0	Al-Hamra	Al-Saada Stadium, Salalah, Oman
17:30 UTC+4	Jamal 12'; Saleh 55'; Moctar 59'

30 September 2011	Al-Nasr	1–2	Oman	Al-Saada Stadium, Salalah, Oman
17:30 UTC+4	Hamid Said 43' (pen.)		Dayo 3'; Naser Abdullah 8'

30 September 2011	Al-Suwaiq	1–3	Al-Oruba
20:00 UTC+4	Yousuf Abdullah 48'		Lorinko 42' (pen.), 71', 86'

30 September 2011	Al-Bashaer	1–4	Sur	Nizwa Sports Complex, Nizwa, Oman
20:00 UTC+4

30 September 2011	Bahla	0–1	Fanja	Nizwa Sports Complex, Nizwa, Oman
20:45 UTC+4			Cissé 4'

1 October 2011	Muscat	0–2	Al-Tali'aa	Royal Oman Police Stadium, Muscat, Oman
17:15 UTC+4			Al-Mukhaini 74'; Al-Shoon 89' (o.g.)

1 October 2011	Al-Nahda	2–1	Bowsher
17:15 UTC+4	Al-Mashaikhi 35'; Al-Shamsi 62'		Ahmed 72' (pen.)

1 October 2011	Al-Seeb	3–2	Al-Musannah	Royal Oman Police Stadium, Muscat, Oman
20:00 UTC+4	Al-Nofali 18', 30'; Faiz Khamis 30'		Khalid Nassar 14'; Al-Alawi 45'

1 October 2011	Al-Khaboora	2–6	Yanqul
20:00 UTC+4

1 October 2011	Salalah	4–0	Bidia	Al-Saada Stadium, Salalah, Oman
20:15 UTC+4	Al-Marhoon 26'; Roberto 50'; Mayami 52', 73'

== Round of 16 ==
16 teams played a knockout tie. 8 ties were played over one leg. The first match was played between Ahli Sidab Club and Al-Mudhaibi SC on 22 October 2011. 8 teams advanced to the Quarterfinals.

22 October 2011	Ahli Sidab	1–1 (6–5 p)	Al-Mudhaibi	Royal Oman Police Stadium, Muscat, Oman
16:50 UTC+4	Mostav 18'		Anderson 29'

22 October 2011	Salalah	0–0 (4–2 p)	Al-Seeb	Al-Saada Stadium, Salalah, Oman
19:45 UTC+4

22 October 2011	Oman	0–1	Sohar	Royal Oman Police Stadium, Muscat, Oman
19:45 UTC+4			Al-Ajmi 45'

23 October 2011	Al-Oruba	3–0	Mirbat
16:45 UTC+4	Lorinko 71', 78'; Al-Asaad 84' (o.g.)

23 October 2011	Sur	2–1	Fanja
19:45 UTC+4	Marquinhos 75'; Al-Ruzaiqi 90'		Cissé 90+3' (pen.)

24 October 2011	Saham	1–2	Al-Ittihad
16:50 UTC+4	Hussain Fazari 5'		Camara 55'; Seedo 90+18'

24 October 2011	Yanqul	0–3	Al-Tali'aa	Ibri Youth Complex, Ibri, Oman
18:50 UTC+4			Felipe 26'; Mohammed Amer 48'; Ahmed 90'

24 October 2011	Al-Nahda	0–1	Dhofar
19:50 UTC+4			Al-Dhabit 12'

== Quarterfinals ==
8 teams played a knockout tie. 4 ties were played over two legs. The first match was played between Sur SC and Al-Oruba SC on 1 November 2011. Sur SC, Al-Ittihad Club, Salalah SC and Dhofar S.C.S.C. qualified for the Semifinals.

=== 1st Legs ===
1 November 2011	Sur	0–0	Al-Oruba	Sur Sports Complex, Sur, Oman
18:20 UTC+4

1 November 2011	Sohar	0–0	Al-Ittihad	Sohar Regional Sports Complex, Sohar, Oman
18:20 UTC+4

2 November 2011	Al-Tali'aa	0–1	Salalah	Sur Sports Complex, Sur, Oman
17:30 UTC+4			Salim 35'

2 November 2011	Ahli Sidab	1–3	Dhofar	Al-Seeb Stadium, Al-Seeb, Al-Batinah, Oman
19:45 UTC+4	Ishaq 36'		Al-Dhabit 45', 62'; Saleh 80'

=== 2nd Legs ===
17 November 2011	Salalah	0–1 (5–4 p)	Al-Tali'aa	Al-Saada Stadium, Salalah, Oman
18:15 UTC+4			Hubail 61'

18 November 2011	Al-Ittihad	1–0	Sohar	Salalah Sports Complex, Salalah, Oman
18:10 UTC+4	Camara 75'

18 November 2011	Dhofar	0–0	Ahli Sidab	Al-Saada Stadium, Salalah, Oman
20:30 UTC+4

19 November 2011	Al-Oruba	1–2	Sur	Sur Sports Complex, Sur, Oman
18:00 UTC+4

== Semifinals ==
4 teams played a knockout tie. 2 ties were played over two legs. The first match was played between Sur SC and Al-Ittihad Club on 1 December 2011. Dhofar S.C.S.C. and Al-Ittihad Club qualified for the finals.

=== 1st Legs ===
1 December 2011	Sur	3–3	Al-Ittihad	Sur Sports Complex, Sur, OmanSohar Regional Sports Complex, Sohar, Oman
18:15 UTC+4

1 December 2011	Dhofar	1–1	Salalah	Al-Saada Stadium, Salalah, Oman
20:15 UTC+4	Al-Hadhri 65'		Roberto 84' (pen.)

=== 2nd Legs ===
7 December 2011	Al-Ittihad	0–0	Sur	Al-Saada Stadium, Salalah, Oman
18:30 UTC+4

7 December 2011	Salalah	0–2	Dhofar	Al-Saada Stadium, Salalah, Oman
21:15 UTC+4			Saleh 36', 48'

== Finals ==
26 December 2011	Dhofar	2–0	Al-Ittihad	Al-Saada Stadium, Salalah, Oman
19:30 UTC+4	Al-Nahar 66'
