= 2005 Sultan Qaboos Cup =

Tournament details
- Country: Oman
- Teams: 32

Final positions
- Champions: Al-Nasr
- Runner-up: Al-Seeb

Tournament statistics
- Matches played: 63
- Goals scored: 206 (3.27 per match)
- Top goal scorer(s): (Oman) Mohammed Al-Hinai (Oman) Hassan Zaher Al-Maghni (Oman) Hashim Saleh (Oman) Hani Al-Dhabit (3 goals)

The 2005 Sultan Qaboos Cup was the 33rd edition of the Sultan Qaboos Cup (Arabic: كأس السلطان قابوس), the premier knockout tournament for football teams in Oman.

The competition began on 1 September 2005 with the group stage and concluded on 14 November 2005. Dhofar S.C.S.C. were the defending champions, having won their sixth title in 2004. On Monday 14 November 2005, Al-Nasr S.C.S.C. were crowned the champions of the 2005 Sultan Qaboos Cup when they defeated Al-Seeb Club 3-1, winning the title for the fourth time.

== Teams ==
The 2005 edition of the tournament had 32 teams. The winners qualified for the 2006 AFC Cup.

- Ahli Sidab Club (Sidab)
- Al-Hamra SC (Al-Hamra)
- Al-Ittihad Club (Salalah)
- Al-Kamel Wa Al-Wafi SC
- Al-Khaboora SC (Al-Khaboora)
- Al-Mudhaibi SC (Al-Mudhaibi)
- Al-Musannah SC (Al-Musannah)
- Al-Nahda Club (Al-Buraimi)
- Al-Nasr S.C.S.C. (Salalah)
- Al-Oruba SC (Sur)
- Al-Rustaq SC (Rustaq)
- Al-Salam SC (Sohar)
- Al-Seeb Club (Seeb)
- Al-Shabab Club (Seeb)
- Al-Suwaiq Club (Suwaiq
- Al-Tali'aa SC (Sur)
- Al-Wahda SC (Sur)
- Bahla Club (Bahla)
- Bidia SC (Bidiya)
- Bowsher Club (Bawshar)
- Dhofar S.C.S.C. (Salalah)
- Fanja SC (Fanja)
- Ibri Club (Ibri)
- Ja'lan SC (Jalan Bani Bu Ali)
- Khasab SC (Khasab)
- Majees SC (Majees)
- Mirbat SC (Mirbat)
- Muscat Club (Muscat)
- Nizwa Club (Nizwa)
- Oman Club (Muscat)
- Quriyat Club (Quriyat)
- Saham SC (Saham)
- Samail SC (Samail)
- Salalah SC (Salalah)
- Sohar SC (Sohar)
- Sur SC (Sur)
- Yanqul SC (Yanqul)

== Group stage ==
=== Group A ===
| Pos. | Team | GP | W | D | L | GS | GA | GD | Pts |
|---|---|---|---|---|---|---|---|---|---|
| 1 | Muscat | 3 | 2 | 0 | 1 | 8 | 2 | +6 | 6 |
| 2 | Bahla | 3 | 2 | 0 | 1 | 6 | 3 | +3 | 6 |
| 3 | Al-Wahda | 3 | 2 | 0 | 1 | 3 | 4 | -1 | 6 |
| 4 | Ja'lan | 3 | 0 | 0 | 3 | 0 | 8 | -8 | 0 |

=== Group B ===
| Pos. | Team | GP | W | D | L | GS | GA | GD | Pts |
|---|---|---|---|---|---|---|---|---|---|
| 1 | Al-Seeb | 3 | 2 | 1 | 0 | 12 | 3 | +9 | 7 |
| 2 | Fanja | 3 | 2 | 0 | 1 | 8 | 6 | +2 | 6 |
| 3 | Al-Khaboora | 3 | 0 | 2 | 1 | 3 | 5 | -2 | 2 |
| 4 | Bidia | 3 | 0 | 1 | 2 | 0 | 9 | -9 | 1 |

=== Group C ===
| Pos. | Team | GP | W | D | L | GS | GA | GD | Pts |
|---|---|---|---|---|---|---|---|---|---|
| 1 | Oman | 3 | 2 | 1 | 0 | 4 | 2 | +2 | 7 |
| 2 | Saham | 3 | 1 | 2 | 0 | 5 | 2 | +3 | 5 |
| 3 | Majees | 3 | 0 | 2 | 1 | 3 | 4 | -1 | 2 |
| 4 | Al-Shabab | 3 | 0 | 1 | 2 | 1 | 5 | -4 | 1 |

=== Group D ===
| Pos. | Team | GP | W | D | L | GS | GA | GD | Pts |
|---|---|---|---|---|---|---|---|---|---|
| 1 | Al-Nasr | 3 | 3 | 0 | 0 | 7 | 0 | +7 | 9 |
| 2 | Al-Mudhaibi | 3 | 2 | 0 | 1 | 5 | 5 | 0 | 6 |
| 3 | Quriyat | 3 | 0 | 1 | 2 | 2 | 5 | -3 | 1 |
| 4 | Ahli Sidab | 3 | 0 | 1 | 2 | 2 | 6 | -4 | 1 |

=== Group E ===
| Pos. | Team | GP | W | D | L | GS | GA | GD | Pts |
|---|---|---|---|---|---|---|---|---|---|
| 1 | Dhofar | 3 | 2 | 1 | 0 | 16 | 3 | +13 | 7 |
| 2 | Al-Musannah | 3 | 2 | 1 | 0 | 7 | 3 | +4 | 7 |
| 3 | Al-Ittihad | 3 | 1 | 0 | 2 | 4 | 8 | -4 | 3 |
| 4 | Ibri | 3 | 0 | 0 | 3 | 3 | 16 | -13 | 0 |

=== Group F ===
| Pos. | Team | GP | W | D | L | GS | GA | GD | Pts |
|---|---|---|---|---|---|---|---|---|---|
| 1 | Al-Salam | 3 | 2 | 1 | 0 | 9 | 2 | +7 | 7 |
| 2 | Al-Oruba | 3 | 2 | 1 | 0 | 5 | 2 | +3 | 7 |
| 3 | Yanqul | 3 | 1 | 0 | 2 | 1 | 7 | -6 | 3 |
| 4 | Salalah | 3 | 0 | 0 | 3 | 0 | 4 | -4 | 0 |

=== Group G ===
| Pos. | Team | GP | W | D | L | GS | GA | GD | Pts |
|---|---|---|---|---|---|---|---|---|---|
| 1 | Sohar | 3 | 1 | 2 | 0 | 5 | 4 | +1 | 5 |
| 2 | Sur | 3 | 1 | 1 | 1 | 3 | 3 | 0 | 4 |
| 3 | Al-Suwaiq | 3 | 0 | 3 | 0 | 4 | 4 | 0 | 3 |
| 4 | Al-Rustaq | 3 | 0 | 2 | 1 | 4 | 5 | -1 | 2 |

=== Group H ===
| Pos. | Team | GP | W | D | L | GS | GA | GD | Pts |
|---|---|---|---|---|---|---|---|---|---|
| 1 | Al-Nahda | 2 | 2 | 0 | 0 | 10 | 2 | +8 | 6 |
| 2 | Al-Tali'aa | 3 | 2 | 0 | 1 | 8 | 4 | +4 | 6 |
| 3 | Nizwa | 1 | 0 | 0 | 1 | 0 | 3 | -3 | 0 |
| 4 | Al-Hamra | 2 | 0 | 0 | 2 | 1 | 10 | -9 | 0 |

=== Group Stage Results ===
The first match played was between Bahla Club and Ja'lan SC on 1 September 2005. 16 teams advanced to the Round of 16.

| 1 September 2005 | Bahla | 3 – 0 | Ja'lan |

| 1 September 2005 | Ahli Sidab | 1 – 3 | Al-Mudhaibi |

| 1 September 2005 | Al-Oruba | 1 – 0 | Yanqul |

| 1 September 2005 | Oman | 1 – 0 | Al-Shabab |

| 1 September 2005 | Al-Seeb | 7 – 0 | Bidia |

| 1 September 2005 | Majees | 1 – 1 | Saham |

| 1 September 2005 | Muscat | 3 – 0 | Al-Wahda |

| 1 September 2005 | Al-Nasr | 2 – 0 | Quriyat |

| 2 September 2005 | Nizwa | 0 – 3 | Al-Tali'aa |

| 2 September 2005 | Al-Salam | 1 – 0 | Salalah |
| 17:40 UTC+4 |

| 2 September 2005 | Al-Ittihad | 1 – 2 | Al-Musannah |
| 19:00 UTC+4 |

| 2 September 2005 | Sohar | 1 – 1 | Al-Suwaiq |
| 19:00 UTC+4 |

| 2 September 2005 | Al-Nahda | 7 – 0 | Al-Hamra |
| 19:00 UTC+4 |

| 2 September 2005 | Dhofar | 10 – 1 | Ibri |
| 19:00 UTC+4 |

| 2 September 2005 | Sur | 1 – 0 | Al-Rustaq |
| 19:40 UTC+4 |

| 5 September 2005 | Al-Wahda | 2 – 1 | Bahla |
| 19:00 UTC+4 |

| 5 September 2005 | Salalah | 0 – 2 | Al-Oruba |
| 19:00 UTC+4 |

| 5 September 2005 | Ja'lan | 0 – 4 | Muscat |
| 19:00 UTC+4 |

| 11 September 2005 | Al-Shabab | 0 – 0 | Majees |
| 17:30 UTC+4 |

| 11 September 2005 | Al-Khaboora | 0 – 0 | Bidia |
| 19:00 UTC+4 |

| 11 September 2005 | Quriyat | 1 – 1 | Ahli Sidab |
| 19:00 UTC+4 |

| 11 September 2005 | Al-Mudhaibi | 0 – 3 | Al-Nasr |
| 19:00 UTC+4 |

| 11 September 2005 | Fanja | 2 – 4 | Al-Seeb |
| 19:00 UTC+4 |

| 11 September 2005 | Ja'lan | 0 – 1 | Al-Wahda |
| 19:00 UTC+4 |

| 11 September 2005 | Saham | 0 – 0 | Oman |
| 19:45 UTC+4 |

| 11 September 2005 | Bahla | 2 – 1 | Muscat |
| 19:45 UTC+4 |

| 12 September 2005 | Dhofar | 1 – 1 | Al-Musannah |
| 17:30 UTC+4 |

| 12 September 2005 | Sohar | 2 – 1 | Sur |
| 19:00 UTC+4 |

| 12 September 2005 | Ibri | 1 – 2 | Al-Ittihad |
| 19:00 UTC+4 |

| 12 September 2005 | Al-Suwaiq | 2 – 2 | Al-Rustaq |
| 19:00 UTC+4 |

| 12 September 2005 | Al-Tali'aa | 3 – 1 | Al-Hamra |
| 19:45 UTC+4 |

| 15 September 2005 | Yanqul | 0 – 6 | Al-Salam |
| 17:45 UTC+4 |

| 15 September 2005 | Al-Khaboora | 2 – 4 | Fanja |
| 17:45 UTC+4 |

| 22 September 2005 | Ahli Sidab | 0 – 2 | Al-Nasr |
| 17:30 UTC+4 |

| 22 September 2005 | Al-Khaboora | 1 – 1 | Al-Seeb |
| 17:30 UTC+4 |

| 22 September 2005 | Fanja | 2 – 0 | Bidia |
| 17:30 UTC+4 |

| 22 September 2005 | Al-Salam | 2 – 2 | Al-Oruba |
| 17:30 UTC+4 |

| 22 September 2005 | Al-Mudhaibi | 2 – 1 | Quriyat |
| 17:30 UTC+4 |

| 22 September 2005 | Salalah | 0 – 1 | Yanqul |
| 17:30 UTC+4 |

| 22 September 2005 | Saham | 4 – 1 | Al-Shabab |
| 19:45 UTC+4 |

| 22 September 2005 | Majees | 2 – 3 | Oman |
| 19:45 UTC+4 |

| 23 September 2005 | Al-Suwaiq | 1 – 1 | Sur |
| 17:30 UTC+4 |

| 23 September 2005 | Al-Ittihad | 1 – 5 | Dhofar |
| 17:30 UTC+4 |

| 23 September 2005 | Sohar | 2 – 2 | Al-Rustaq |
| 17:30 UTC+4 |

| 23 September 2005 | Al-Tali'aa | 2 – 3 | Al-Nahda |
| 17:30 UTC+4 |

| 23 September 2005 | Al-Musannah | 4 – 1 | Ibri |
| 17:30 UTC+4 |

== Round of 16 ==
16 teams played a knockout tie. 8 ties were played over one leg. The first match was played between Dhofar S.C.S.C. and Sur SC on 6 October 2005. 8 teams advanced to the quarterfinals.

| 6 October 2005 | Dhofar | 0 – 1 | Sur |

| 6 October 2005 | Fanja | 1 – 7 | Al-Nasr |

| 6 October 2005 | Bahla | 2 – 0 | Oman |

| 6 October 2005 | Muscat | 0 – 1 | Saham |

| 6 October 2005 | Al-Musannah | 0 – 2 | Sohar |

| 7 October 2005 | Al-Seeb | 1 – 0 | Al-Mudhaibi |

| 7 October 2005 | Al-Oruba | 3 – 2 | Al-Nahda |

| 7 October 2005 | Al-Salam | 0 – 1 | Al-Tali'aa |

== Quarterfinals ==
8 teams played a knockout tie. 4 ties were played over one leg. The first match was played between Sur SC and Al-Tali'aa SC on 13 October 2005. Sur SC, Al-Oruba SC, Al-Nasr S.C.S.C. and Al-Seeb Club qualified for the semifinals.

| 13 October 2005 | Sur | 3 – 2 | Al-Tali'aa |

| 14 October 2005 | Sohar | 0 – 4 | Al-Oruba |

| 14 October 2005 | Al-Nasr | 2 – 0 | Bahla |

| 14 October 2005 | Saham | 1 – 3 | Al-Seeb |

== Semifinals ==
4 teams played a knockout tie. 2 ties were played over two legs. The first match was played between Sur SC and Al-Seeb Club on 20 October 2005. Al-Nasr S.C.S.C. and Al-Seeb Club qualified for the Finals.

=== First legs ===
| 20 October 2005 | Sur | 1 – 1 | Al-Seeb |

| 20 October 2005 | Al-Nasr | 2 – 1 | Al-Oruba |

=== Second legs ===
| 24 October 2005 | Al-Oruba | 3 – 4 | Al-Nasr |
| 21:30 UTC+4 |

| 24 October 2005 | Al-Seeb | 1 – 1 (5 - 4 p) | Sur |
| 21:30 UTC+4 |

== Third Place ==
| 27 October 2005 | Al-Oruba | 0 – 0 (4 - 3 p) | Sur |
| 21:15 UTC+4 |

== Finals ==
| 14 November 2005 | Al-Nasr | 3 – 1 | Al-Seeb |
| 19:00 UTC+4 |
