= 2010–11 Oman Mobile League =

Oman Mobile League
- Season: 2010–11
- Champions: Al-Suwaiq
- Relegated: Muscat; Saham; Al-Nasr
- AFC Cup: Al-Suwaiq; Al-Oruba
- Matches: 132
- Goals: 289 (2.19 per match)
- Top goalscorer: (Brazil) Rodrigo Felix D'Oliveira (12 goals)
- Biggest home win: Al-Oruba 5-1 Al-Nasr (23 December 2010); Al-Nahda 4-0 Ahli Sidab (4 February 2011); Al-Tali'aa 4-0 Al-Shabab (11 March 2011); Dhofar 4-0 Al-Suwaiq (21 March 2011); Al-Suwaiq 5-1 Muscat (17 April 2011)
- Biggest away win: Salalah 0-3 Muscat (18 December 2010); Muscat 0-3 Al-Suwaiq (24 December 2010); Ahli Sidab 0-3 Al-Suwaiq (7 April 2011); Al-Nasr 0-3 Al-Suwaiq (30 April 2011)
- Highest scoring: Al-Tali'aa 4-2 Dhofar (12 November 2010); Al-Shabab 4-2 Al-Tali'aa (23 December 2010); Al-Oruba 5-1 Al-Nahda (23 December 2010); Al-Suwaiq 5-1 Muscat (17 April 2011); Al-Tali'aa 3-3 Salalah (30 April 2011)
- Longest winning run: (6 games); Al-Oruba
- Longest unbeaten run: (8 games); Al-Suwaiq
- Longest losing run: (5 games); Dhofar

The 2010–11 Omani League (known as the Oman Mobile League for sponsorship reasons) was the 35th edition of the top football league in Oman. It began on 1 November 2010 and finished on 30 April 2011. Al-Suwaiq Club were the defending champions, having won the 2009–10 Oman Mobile League season. On Saturday, 30 April 2011, Al-Suwaiq Club won 0–3 away in their final league match against Al-Nasr S.C.S.C. and emerged as the champions of the 2010–11 Oman Mobile League with a total of 43 points.

== Teams ==
This season the league had 12 teams. Al-Khaboura SC and Al-Seeb Club were relegated to the Second Division League after finishing the relegation zone in the 2009–10 season. The two relegated teams were replaced by Second Division League winners Ahli Sidab Club (Group A) and Al-Hilal SC (Group B).

=== Stadia and locations ===
Club	Home city	Stadium	Capacity
Al-Nahda	Al-Buraimi	Nizwa Sports Complex	10,000
Al-Nasr	Salalah	Al-Saada Stadium / Salalah Sports Complex	12,000 / 8,000
Al-Oruba	Sur	Sur Sports Complex	8,000
Al-Shabab	Barka	Seeb Stadium	14,000
Ahli Sidab	Sidab	Sultan Qaboos Sports Complex	39,000
Al-Suwaiq	Al-Suwaiq	Sohar Regional Sports Complex	19,000
Al-Tali'aa	Sur	Sur Sports Complex	8,000
Dhofar	Salalah	Al-Saada Stadium / Salalah Sports Complex	12,000 / 8,000
Muscat	Muscat	Sultan Qaboos Sports Complex / Royal Oman Police Stadium	39,000 / 18,000
Oman	Muscat	Sultan Qaboos Sports Complex / Royal Oman Police Stadium	39,000 / 18,000
Saham	Saham	Sohar Regional Sports Complex	19,000
Al-Hilal	Salalah	Al-Saada Stadium	12,000

== League table ==
As of 30 April 2011

Pos	Team	Pld	W	D	L	GF	GA	GD	Pts	Qualification or relegation
1	Al-Suwaiq (C)	22	12	7	3	31	15	+16	43	2012 AFC Cup group stage
2	Al-Oruba	22	12	4	6	31	14	+17	40	2012 AFC Cup group stage (Note: Al-Oruba were the second representative from Oman, instead of Dhofar who were the winners of 2011 Sultan Qaboos Cup (final came too late for 2012 AFC Cup).)
3	Al-Nahda	22	10	8	4	30	18	+12	38	2012 GCC Champions League group stage
4	Dhofar	22	8	6	8	24	22	+2	30	
5	Oman	22	7	8	7	24	22	+2	29	
6	Al-Shabab	22	8	4	10	25	29	−4	28	
7	Al-Hilal	22	7	6	9	25	29	−4	27	
8	Al Tali'aa	22	6	8	8	27	27	0	26	
11	Ahli Sidab	22	7	5	10	14	23	−9	26	
9	Muscat (R)	22	6	8	8	23	30	−7	26	Relegation Playoff
10	Saham (R)	22	7	5	10	18	27	−9	26	Relegation to 2011–12 Oman First Division League
12	Al-Nasr (R)	22	5	7	10	17	33	−16	22	Relegation to 2011–12 Oman First Division League

Updated to match(es) played on 23 January 2011. Source: League Table
Rules for classification: 1) points; 2) goal difference; 3) number of goals scored.
(C) Champions; (R) Relegated

== Results ==
As of 30 April 2011

Home \ Away	ALNH	ALN	ALO	ALSH	ALH	ALSU	ALT	DHO	MCT	OMA	SAH	ALHI
Al-Nahda		1–0	0–0	2–1	4–0	0–1	0–0	1–1	3–0	2–1	2–3	2–1
Al-Nasr	3–2		1–0	0–0	0–1	0–3	2–1	0–1	2–0	1–3	1–1	2–2
Al-Oruba	1–0	5–1		3–1	2–1	1–0	3–2	2–0	3–0	2–0	4–1	4–1
Al-Shabab	1–1	3–1	1–0		1–0	0–0	4–2	2–0	1–3	1–2	0–1	3–1
Ahli Sidab	1–2	1–1	0–1	0–1		0–3	0–0	1–0	0–0	1–0	1–0	0–0
Al-Suwaiq	1–1	2–1	2–2	1–0	1–0		1–0	0–1	5–1	1–1	2–1	2–0
Al-Tali'aa	1–2	1–1	1–0	4–0	1–2	0–0		4–2	2–1	0–0	3–0	3–3
Dhofar	0–2	0–0	0–1	2–0	3–1	4–0	3–1		1–1	1–1	1–0	0–0
Muscat	1–1	1–0	0–0	1–1	1–2	0–3	1–1	2–1		1–3	3–0	1–1
Oman	0–1	0–0	1–2	1–2	1–1	1–1	2–0	1–1	0–0		1–0	2–1
Saham	0–0	2–0	0–0	2–1	2–1	1–1	0–0	0–1	0–2	3–2		1–0
Al-Hilal	1–1	3–0	2–0	2–1	1–0	0–1	3–1	2–1	0–3	0–1	1–0	

Updated to match(es) played on unknown. Source: Results
Legend: Blue = home team win; Yellow = draw; Red = away team win.

== Promotion/relegation play-off ==
=== 1st leg ===
5 May 2011
19:20 UTC+4

Fanja	0 - 1	Muscat
	Report

Nizwa Sports Complex, Nizwa, Oman

=== 2nd leg ===
12 May 2011
19:20 UTC+4

Muscat	1 - 2 (a.e.t.)	Fanja
	Report

Seeb Stadium, Seeb, Al Batinah, Oman

Fanja secured promotion after winning by away goals rule (2-2).

== Season statistics ==
=== Top scorers ===
As of 30 April 2011

Rank	Scorer	Club	Goals
1	(Brazil) Rodrigo Felix D'Oliveira	Al-Nahda	12
2	(Senegal) Ely Cissé	Al-Tali'aa	10
3	(Oman) Abdullah Al-Mukhaini	Al-Oruba	8
3	(Oman) Hassan Rabia	Al-Suwaiq	8
5	(Oman) Hashim Saleh	Dhofar	7
6	Abu Bakar	Al-Nahda	6
6	Sulaiman Kamara	Muscat	6
6	(Oman) Younis Al Mushaifri	Al-Shabab	6
6	(Oman) Mohammed Said Al-Shamsi	Al-Hilal	6
10	(Oman) Mohsin Saleh	Al-Suwaiq	5
10	(Oman) Said Al-Ruazaiqi	Al-Tali'aa	5
10	(Oman) Hussain Al-Hadhri	Dhofar	5

== Media coverage ==
Oman Mobile League Media Coverage
Country	Television Channel	Matches
Oman	Oman TV2	3 Matches per round

== See also ==
- 2010 Sultan Qaboos Cup
- 2010–11 Oman First Division League
