= 2016–17 Sultan Qaboos Cup =

Tournament details
- Country: Oman
- Teams: 38

Final positions
- Champions: Al-Suwaiq
- Runners-up: Dhofar

The 2016–17 Sultan Qaboos Cup was the 44th edition of the Sultan Qaboos Cup (Arabic: كأس السلطان قابوس), the premier knockout tournament for football teams in Oman.

The competition began on 14 October 2016 with the Qualification round. Saham Club were the defending champions, having won their second title in 2016.

== Teams ==
This year the tournament had 38 teams.

- Ahli Sidab Club (Sidab)
- Al-Bashaer Club
- Al-Hamra SC (Al-Hamra)
- Al-Ittifaq Club
- Al-Ittihad Club (Salalah)
- Al-Khabourah SC (Al-Khabourah)
- Al-Mudhaibi Club (Mudhaibi)
- Al-Musannah SC (Al-Musannah)
- Al-Nahda Club (Al-Buraimi)
- Al-Nasr S.C.S.C. (Salalah)
- Al-Oruba SC (Sur)
- Al-Rustaq SC (Rustaq)
- Al-Salam SC (Sohar)
- Al-Seeb Club (Al-Seeb)
- Al-Shabab Club (Seeb)
- Al-Suwaiq Club (Suwaiq
- Al-Wusta Club (Al-Wusta)
- Bahla Club (Bahla)
- Bidia SC (Bidiya)
- Bowsher Club (Bowsher)
- Dhofar S.C.S.C. (Salalah)
- Fanja SC (Fanja)
- Ja'lan SC (Jalan Bani Bu Ali)
- Majees SC (Majees)
- Mirbat SC (Mirbat)
- Muscat Club (Muscat)
- Nizwa Club (Nizwa)
- Oman Club (Muscat)
- Quriyat Club (Quriyat)
- Saham SC (Saham)
- Salalah SC (Salalah)
- Sohar SC (Sohar)
- Sur SC (Sur)
- Yanqul SC (Yanqul)

== Qualification round ==
8 teams played against each other in the First Round of qualification. The losing teams of the 4 ties than played a tie each against each other over one leg. 3 ties were played over one leg. The first match was played between Al-Ittifaq Club and Quriyat Club on 14 October 2016. Al-Ittifaq Club, Majees SC, Al-Hamra SC, Ahli Sidab Club, Yanqul SC and Al-Wusta Club advanced to the Round of 32 after winning their respective ties.

=== Round 1 ===
14 October 2016	Al-Ittifaq	1 – 0	Quriyat
15:15 UTC+4	Mohammed Fadiga	Report

14 October 2016	Majees	1 – 0	Al-Bashaer
18:15 UTC+4	Abdullah Al-Maamari	Report

14 October 2016	Al-Hamra	4 – 2	Yanqul
18:15 UTC+4	Sergio; Sergio; Mohammed Al-Ajmi; Mohammed Al-Ajmi	Report	Sulan Al-Ghafri; Mohammed Abdullah

14 October 2016	Al-Wusta	0 – 1	Ahli Sidab
18:15 UTC+4		Report

=== Round 2 ===
21 October 2016	Yanqul	4 – 2	Quriyat
15:15 UTC+4	Waleed Khalid; Sultan Al-Ghafri; Sultan Al-Ghafri; Moataz Al-Balushi	Report	Rashad Al-Busafi; Hussain Al-Ghazali

21 October 2016	Al-Bashaer	1 – 1 (3 – 4 p)	Al-Wusta
18:15 UTC+4	Faisal Al-Hinaia	Report	Al-Hinai

== Round of 32 ==
17 November 2016	Al-Rustaq	3 - 0	Al-Nahda	Al-Seeb Stadium, Al-Seeb, Oman
17:45 UTC+4	Aqeel Al-Khamisi 91'	Report 1 Report 2	Feupa Jean Francois 51', 55'	Referee: Mahmood Al-Mujrafi (Oman)

17 November 2016	Ahli Sidab	1 - 1 (3 – 4 p)	Al-Mudhaibi	Sultan Qaboos Sports Complex, Muscat, Oman
17:45 UTC+4	Qasim Al-Barashdi 41'	Report	Kim 46'

17 November 2016	Nizwa	1 - 0	Al-Ittifaq	Nizwa Sports Complex, Nizwa, Oman
17:45 UTC+4	Hisam Nasser 29'	Report		Referee: Al-Muatassim Al-Yaqoobi (Oman)

17 November 2016	Saham	4 - 1	Bidia	Sohar Regional Sports Complex, Sohar, Oman
17:45 UTC+4	Al-Ghassani 7', 30', 48'; Ronir de Souza Gonçalves 74'	Report	Abdul Muain Al-Marzouqi 39' (o.g.)	Referee: Haitham Al-Amri (Oman)

18 November 2016	Al-Wusta	1 - 3	Ja'lan	Sur Sports Complex, Sur, Oman
17:45 UTC+4	Beko 44'	Report	Yaseen Al-Shuhimi 26', 47'; Younis Al-Shukaili 38'	Referee: Falah Al-Balushi (Oman)

18 November 2016	Muscat	3 - 1	Bahla	Al-Seeb Stadium, Al-Seeb, Oman
17:45 UTC+4	Said Al-Dhabouni 16'; Abdou Kader Fall 36' (pen.); Samir Al-Habsi 82'	Report	Isha 7'	Referee: Naif Al-Balushi (Oman)

18 November 2016	Sur	2 - 2 (3 – 4 p)	Al-Salam	Salalah Sports Complex, Salalah, Oman
17:45 UTC+4	Jefferson de Jesus Florencio 25', 59'	Report	Sanjo 20'; Oki 75'

18 November 2016	Sohar	2 - 0	Mirbat	Sohar Regional Sports Complex, Sohar, Oman
17:45 UTC+4	Babakar 21'; Ishaq Al-Muqbali 51'	Report		Referee: Khalid Al-Rushaidi (Oman)

18 November 2016	Salalah	0 - 2	Al-Hamra	Salalah Sports Complex, Salalah, Oman
18:15 UTC+4		Report	Mohammed Al-Ajmi; Nabil Al-Aghari	Referee: Majid Al-Ruqadi (Oman)

19 November 2016	Fanja	5 - 1	Al-Ittihad	Al-Seeb Stadium, Al-Seeb, Oman
20:30 UTC+4	Al-Muqbali 18', 32', 36'; Al-Mashari 69'; Shawqi Al-Ruqadi 90'	Report 1 Report 2 Report 3	Nasser Al-Ghazi 45'	Referee: Haitham Al-Amri (Oman)

19 November 2016	Al-Nasr	0 - 0 (2 – 4 p)	Al-Shabab	Salalah Sports Complex, Salalah, Oman
17:00 UTC+4		Report 1 Report 2		Referee: Omar Al-Yaqoubi (Oman)
	Penalties
	Al-Khaldi (penalty scored); Fallou Gallas Wade (penalty scored); Abdullah Al-Mashaikhi (penalty missed); Al-Saadi (penalty missed)		Fernando Evangelista dos Santos (penalty scored); Jenyat (penalty scored); Al-Mushaifri (penalty scored); Al-Yahmadi (penalty scored)

19 November 2016	Bowsher	2 - 1	Al-Oruba	Sultan Qaboos Sports Complex, Muscat, Oman
17:45 UTC+4	Fahad Al-Shuaimi 70'; Franko 77'	Report 1 Report 2	Al-Lawati 84'	Referee: Abdullah Al-Shamakhi (Oman)

19 November 2016	Yanqul	0 - 4	Al-Suwaiq	Ibri Sports Complex, Ibri, Oman
18:00 UTC+4		Report	A. Al-Ghassani 14'; Mohsin Al-Ghassani 20', 45'; Al-Mushaifri 85'	Referee: Muhanna Al-Waqish (Oman)

19 November 2016	Majees	1 - 2	Oman	Sohar Regional Sports Complex, Sohar, Oman
18:00 UTC+4	Omar Al-Zaabi 40'	Report	Al-Hamhami 16'; Vlasichev 60'	Referee: Khalid Al-Shaqsi (Oman)

19 November 2016	Dhofar	0 - 0 (4 – 3 p)	Al-Seeb	Salalah Sports Complex, Salalah, Oman
20:15 UTC+4		Report 1 Report 2 Report 3		Referee: Zakri Al-Hinai (Oman)
	Penalties
	Said (penalty scored); Abdullah Fawaz (penalty scored); Hisham Al-Shuaibi (penalty scored); Said Rabia (penalty scored)		Al-Balushi (penalty scored); Anas Al-Farsi (penalty missed); Shahen (penalty scored); Egwuatu (penalty scored); Lamine Kone (penalty missed)

19 November 2016	Al-Musannah	0 - 1	Al-Khaboura	Al-Seeb Stadium, Al-Seeb, Oman
20:15 UTC+4		Report 1 Report 2	Nooh Wael 23'	Referee: Qasim Al-Hatmi (Oman)

== Round of 16 ==
The draw for the round of 16 was held on 21 November 2016. The first match was played between Al-Rustaq SC and Oman Club on 9 December 2016 at the Al-Buraimi Sports Complex, Al-Buraimi.

9 December 2016	Al-Rustaq	1 – 3	Oman	Al-Buraimi, Oman
16:45 UTC+4

9 December 2016	Al-Hamra	1 – 3	Dhofar	Nizwa Sports Complex, Nizwa, Oman
18:00 UTC+4

9 December 2016	Bowsher	1 – 0	Muscat	Sultan Qaboos Sports Complex, Muscat, Oman
18:00 UTC+4

9 December 2016	Saham	2 – 1	Fanja	Sohar Regional Sports Complex, Sohar, Oman
19:30 UTC+4

10 December 2016	Ja'lan	1 – 0	Sohar	Sur Sports Complex, Sur, Oman
16:45 UTC+4

10 December 2016	Al-Suwaiq	5 – 2	Al-Mudhaibi	Sohar Regional Sports Complex, Sohar, Oman
18:00 UTC+4

10 December 2016	Nizwa	1 – 2	Al-Khaboura	Nizwa Sports Complex, Nizwa, Oman
18:00 UTC+4

10 December 2016	Al-Shabab	1 – 4	Al-Salam	Al-Seeb Stadium, Al-Seeb, Oman
19:30 UTC+4

== Quarter-finals ==
The first match was played between Al-Salam and Al-Suwaiq on 15 December 2016 at the Sohar Regional Sports Complex, Sohar. Al-Suwaiq, Saham, Dhofar and Oman advanced to the Semi-finals.

=== First leg ===
15 December 2016	Al-Salam	0 - 1	Al-Suwaiq	Sohar Regional Sports Complex, Sohar, Oman
13:30 UTC+4		Report

15 December 2016	Saham	2 - 0	Ja'lan	Sohar Regional Sports Complex, Sohar, Oman
16:00 UTC+4		Report

16 December 2016	Dhofar	3 - 1	Al-Khaboura	Salalah Sports Complex, Salalah, Oman
14:10 UTC+4		Report

16 December 2016	Bowsher	0 - 3	Oman	Sultan Qaboos Sports Complex, Muscat, Oman
16:45 UTC+4		Report

=== Second leg ===
13 February 2017	Al-Suwaiq	2 - 2	Al-Salam	Sohar Regional Sports Complex, Sohar, Oman
18:00 UTC+4		Report

13 February 2017	Ja'lan	1 - 0	Saham	Sur Sports Complex, Sur, Oman
15:30 UTC+4		Report

13 February 2017	Al-Khabourah	1 - 1	Dhofar	Sohar Regional Sports Complex, Sohar, Oman
14:30 UTC+4		Report

13 February 2017	Oman	2 - 0	Bowsher	Sultan Qaboos Sports Complex, Muscat, Oman
16:45 UTC+4		Report

== Semi-finals ==
The first match was played between Oman and Al-Suwaiq on 16 March 2017 at Sultan Qaboos Sports Complex, Muscat. Al-Suwaiq and Dhofar advanced to the Finals.

=== First leg ===
16 March 2017	Oman	1 - 0	Al-Suwaiq	Sultan Qaboos Sports Complex, Muscat, Oman
14:30 UTC+4		Report

16 March 2017	Saham	0 - 2	Dhofar	Sohar Regional Sports Complex, Sohar, Oman
16:45 UTC+4		Report

=== Second leg ===
11 April 2017	Al-Suwaiq	2 - 0	Oman	Sohar Regional Sports Complex, Sohar, Oman
16:00 UTC+4		Report

11 April 2017	Dhofar	0 - 1	Saham	Salalah Sports Complex, Salalah, Oman
18:15 UTC+4		Report

== Finals ==
The Finals of the 2016–17 Sultan Qaboos Cup was played between Al-Suwaiq and Dhofar on 25 May 2017 at the Sultan Qaboos Sports Complex, Muscat. Al-Suwaiq won the title for the third time in their history.

25 May 2017	Al-Suwaiq	2 - 0	Dhofar	Sultan Qaboos Sports Complex, Muscat, Oman
17:15 UTC+4		Report		Referee: Mahmoud Al-Mijrafi

== See also ==
- 2016–17 Oman Professional League
