= 2008 Sultan Qaboos Cup =

Tournament details
- Country: Oman
- Teams: 27

Final positions
- Champions: Al-Suwaiq
- Runner-up: Al-Nahda

Tournament statistics
- Matches played: 65
- Goals scored: 162 (2.49 per match)

The 2008 Sultan Qaboos Cup was the 36th edition of the Sultan Qaboos Cup (Arabic: كأس السلطان قابوس), the premier knockout tournament for football teams in Oman.

The competition began on 26 August 2008 with the Group Stage and concluded on 15 December 2008. Sur SC were the defending champions, having won their third title in 2007. On Monday 15 December 2008, Al-Suwaiq Club were crowned the champions of the 2008 Sultan Qaboos Cup after defeating Al-Nahda Club 1–0, hence winning the title for the first time.

== Teams ==
The 2008 edition of the tournament had 27 teams. The winners qualified for the 2009 AFC Cup.

- Ahli Sidab Club (Sidab)
- Al-Bashaer Club
- Al-Khaboora SC (Al-Khaboora)
- Al-Musannah SC (Al-Musannah)
- Al-Nahda Club (Al-Buraimi)
- Al-Nasr S.C.S.C. (Salalah)
- Al-Oruba SC (Sur)
- Al-Rustaq SC (Rustaq)
- Al-Salam SC (Sohar)
- Al-Seeb Club (Seeb)
- Al-Shabab Club (Seeb)
- Al-Suwaiq Club (Suwaiq
- Al-Tali'aa SC (Sur)
- Bahla Club (Bahla)
- Dhofar S.C.S.C. (Salalah)
- Fanja SC (Fanja)
- Ja'lan SC (Jalan Bani Bu Ali)
- Majees SC (Majees)
- Mirbat SC (Mirbat)
- Muscat Club (Muscat)
- Nizwa Club (Nizwa)
- Oman Club (Muscat)
- Quriyat Club (Quriyat)
- Saham SC (Saham)
- Salalah SC (Salalah)
- Sohar SC (Sohar)
- Sur SC (Sur)

== Group stage ==
=== Group A ===
Pos.	Team	GP	W	D	L	GS	GA	GD	Pts
1	Ja'lan	4	2	1	1	5	3	+2	7
2	Al-Tali'aa	4	2	1	1	4	2	+2	7
3	Fanja	4	1	3	0	7	3	+4	6
4	Nizwa	4	1	1	2	4	10	-6	4
5	Majees	4	1	0	3	8	10	-2	3

=== Group B ===
Pos.	Team	GP	W	D	L	GS	GA	GD	Pts
1	Al-Bashaer	4	3	0	1	7	4	+3	9
2	Oman	4	2	2	0	9	5	+4	8
3	Bahla	4	2	1	1	5	3	+2	7
4	Al-Rustaq	4	1	1	2	4	4	0	4
5	Al-Salam	4	0	0	4	2	11	-9	0

=== Group C ===
Pos.	Team	GP	W	D	L	GS	GA	GD	Pts
1	Al-Suwaiq	3	1	2	0	9	3	+6	5
2	Muscat	3	1	2	0	7	3	+4	5
3	Ahli Sidab	3	0	3	0	6	6	0	3
4	Mirbat	3	0	1	2	0	10	-10	1

=== Group D ===
Pos.	Team	GP	W	D	L	GS	GA	GD	Pts
1	Salalah	4	3	1	0	4	1	+3	10
2	Al-Nahda	4	2	1	1	5	2	+3	7
3	Al-Musannah	4	2	0	2	7	6	+1	6
4	Quriyat	4	0	3	1	3	5	-2	3
5	Sohar	4	0	1	3	2	7	-5	1

=== Group Stage Results ===
The first match played was between Al-Tali'aa SC and Nizwa Club on 26 August 2008. 8 teams advanced to the Round of 16 and joined the other 8 teams who were pre-qualified.

26 August 2008	Al-Tali'aa SC	2 – 0	Nizwa

26 August 2008	Bahla	0 – 1	Al-Bashaer

26 August 2008	Majees	1 – 3	Ja'lan

26 August 2008	Sohar	0 – 0	Quriyat

27 August 2008	Oman	1 – 1	Al-Rustaq

3 September 2008	Muscat	0 – 0	Al-Suwaiq

4 September 2008	Oman	3 – 1	Al-Salam

4 September 2008	Al-Tali'aa SC	1 – 1	Fanja

4 September 2008	Al-Nahda	0 – 1	Salalah

4 September 2008	Ahli Sidab	0 – 0	Mirbat

4 September 2008	Bahla	1 – 0	Al-Rustaq

4 September 2008	Majees	6 – 1	Nizwa

4 September 2008	Sohar	2 – 4	Al-Musannah

8 September 2008	Al-Nahda	2 – 0	Al-Musannah

12 September 2008	Muscat	3 – 3	Ahli Sidab
21:30 UTC+4

12 September 2008	Oman	4 – 2	Al-Bashaer
21:30 UTC+4

12 September 2008	Al-Tali'aa	0 – 1	Ja'lan
21:30 UTC+4

12 September 2008	Al-Suwaiq	6 – 0	Mirbat
21:30 UTC+4

12 September 2008	Al-Nahda	1 – 1	Quriyat
21:30 UTC+4

12 September 2008	Fanja	1 – 1	Nizwa
21:30 UTC+4

12 September 2008	Al-Salam	0 – 3	Al-Rustaq
21:30 UTC+4

12 September 2008	Salalah	1 – 0	Al-Musannah
21:30 UTC+4

18 September 2008	Fanja	0 – 0	Ja'lan
21:30 UTC+4

19 September 2008	Oman	1 – 1	Bahla
21:30 UTC+4

19 September 2008	Al-Tali'aa	1 – 0	Majees
21:30 UTC+4

19 September 2008	Al-Salam	0 – 2	Al-Bashaer
21:30 UTC+4

19 September 2008	Quriyat	1 – 3	Al-Musannah
21:30 UTC+4

19 September 2008	Salalah	1 – 0	Sohar
21:30 UTC+4

25 September 2008	Al-Bashaer	2 – 0	Al-Rustaq
21:30 UTC+4

26 September 2008	Muscat	4 – 0	Mirbat
21:30 UTC+4

26 September 2008	Al-Suwaiq	3 – 3	Ahli Sidab
21:30 UTC+4

26 September 2008	Al-Nahda	2 – 0	Sohar
21:30 UTC+4

26 September 2008	Ja'lan	1 – 2	Nizwa
21:30 UTC+4

26 September 2008	Fanja	5 – 1	Majees
21:30 UTC+4

26 September 2008	Al-Salam	1 – 3	Bahla
21:30 UTC+4

26 September 2008	Salalah	1 – 1	Quriyat
21:30 UTC+4

== Round of 16 ==
16 teams played a knockout tie. 8 ties were played over two legs. The first match was played between Ja'lan SC and Muscat Club on 5 October 2008. 8 teams advanced to the quarterfinals.

=== 1st Legs ===
5 October 2008	Ja'lan	1 – 1	Muscat

5 October 2008	Al-Oruba	4 – 0	Saham

5 October 2008	Al-Nasr	2 – 1	Al-Shabab

6 October 2008	Al-Seeb	1 – 1	Al-Suwaiq

6 October 2008	Al-Bashaer	2 – 1	Sur

9 October 2008	Al-Tali'aa	1 – 0	Salalah

10 October 2008	Dhofar	0 – 0	Al-Khaboora
18:40 UTC+4

15 October 2008	Oman	2 – 2	Al-Nahda
18:15 UTC+4

=== 2nd Legs ===
16 October 2008	Sur	0 – 1	Al-Bashaer
17:00 UTC+4

16 October 2008	Salalah	0 – 1	Al-Tali'aa
18:35 UTC+4

17 October 2008	Al-Khaboora	1 – 1	Dhofar
18:20 UTC+4

18 October 2008	Al-Shabab	0 – 0	Al-Nasr
18:15 UTC+4

18 October 2008	Muscat	1 – 0	Ja'lan
18:15 UTC+4

18 October 2008	Saham	0 – 0	Al-Oruba
18:20 UTC+4

18 October 2008	Al-Suwaiq	4 – 3 (4 - 3 p)	Al-Seeb
18:20 UTC+4

25 October 2008	Al-Nahda	1 – 0	Oman
22:15 UTC+4

== Quarterfinals ==
8 teams played a knockout tie. 4 ties were played over two legs. The first match was played between Al-Nasr S.C.S.C. and Al-Tali'aa SC on 30 October 2008. Al-Tali'aa SC, Al-Oruba SC, Al-Nahda Club and Al-Suwaiq Club qualified for the semifinals.

=== 1st Legs ===
30 October 2008	Al-Nasr	2 – 1	Al-Tali'aa

30 October 2008	Al-Oruba	2 – 2	Al-Bashaer

31 October 2008	Muscat	2 – 2	Al-Nahda
18:30 UTC+4

3 November 2008	Dhofar	2 – 1	Al-Suwaiq
18:45 UTC+4

=== 2nd Legs ===
6 November 2008	Al-Bashaer	1 – 3	Al-Oruba

6 November 2008	Al-Tali'aa	2 – 0	Al-Nasr
18:45 UTC+4

7 November 2008	Al-Nahda	2 – 0	Muscat

8 November 2008	Al-Suwaiq	2 – 1 (5 - 3 p)	Dhofar
18:45 UTC+4

== Semifinals ==
4 teams played a knockout tie. 2 ties were played over two legs. The first match was played between Al-Nahda Club and Al-Oruba SC on 24 November 2008. Al-Nahda Club and Al-Suwaiq Club qualified for the finals.

=== 1st Legs ===
24 November 2008	Al-Nahda	1 – 1	Al-Oruba
18:15 UTC+4

24 November 2008	Al-Suwaiq	0 – 0	Al-Tali'aa
18:15 UTC+4

=== 2nd Legs ===
2 December 2008	Al-Oruba	0 – 2	Al-Nahda

2 December 2008	Al-Tali'aa	1 – 1	Al-Suwaiq

== Finals ==
15 December 2008	Al-Nahda	0 – 1	Al-Suwaiq
18:30 UTC+4			Saleh 78'
