= 2014–15 Oman First Division League =

Oman First Division League
- Season: 2014–15
- Champions: Muscat
- Relegated: Samail
- Matches: 156
- Goals: 389 (2.49 per match)
- Biggest home win: Salalah 6–0 Ahli Sidab (27 November 2014); Muscat 6–0 Ahli Sidab (15 May 2015)
- Biggest away win: Nizwa 0–3 Al-Ittihad (20 September 2014); Nizwa 1–4 Salalah (11 October 2014); Ahli Sidab 1–4 Muscat (27 December 2014); Ahli Sidab 0–3 Al-Wahda (16 January 2015); Al-Rustaq 0–3 Al-Tali'aa (17 January 2015)
- Highest scoring: Al-Rustaq 5–4 Al-Mudhaibi (27 November 2014)
- Longest winning run: (6 games); Nizwa
- Longest unbeaten run: (9 games); Al-Tali'aa
- Longest losing run: (7 games); Mirbat

The 2014-15 Oman First Division League (known as the Omantel First Division League for sponsorship reasons) is the 39th edition of the second-highest division overall football league in Oman. The season began on 18 September 2014, and will conclude on 16 May 2015. Al-Khabourah SC are the defending champions, having won their third title in the previous 2013–14 season.

== League table ==
Pos	Team	Pld	W	D	L	GF	GA	GD	Pts	Promotion or relegation
1	Muscat (C)	24	16	4	4	47	16	+31	52	Promotion to 2015-16 Oman Professional League
2	Salalah	24	15	4	5	46	25	+21	49	Promotion to 2015-16 Oman Professional League
3	Al-Rustaq	24	11	8	5	28	25	+3	41	Promotion play-off
4	Nizwa	24	12	4	8	36	30	+6	40	
5	Al-Tali'aa	24	9	7	8	29	25	+4	34	
6	Al-Mudhaibi	24	9	7	8	25	29	−4	34	
7	Ahli Sidab	24	9	4	11	32	47	−15	31	
8	Oman	24	8	5	11	26	29	−3	29	
9	Al-Wahda	24	7	5	12	25	28	−3	26	
10	Mirbat	24	7	5	12	23	32	−9	26	
11	Al-Kamel Wa Al-Wafi	24	6	7	11	29	35	−6	25	
12	Al-Ittihad	24	7	4	13	22	36	−14	25	
13	Samail	24	5	6	13	21	32	−11	21	Relegation to 2015–16 Oman Second Division League

Updated to match(es) played on 15 May 2015. Source: League Table
Rules for classification: 1) points; 2) goal difference; 3) number of goals scored.
(C) Champions

== Results ==
Home \ Away	AHS	ALI	ALK	ALM	ALR	ALT	ALW	MIR	MUS	NIZ	OMA	SAL	SAM
Ahli Sidab		3–1	3–1	2–3	0–1	0–1	0–3	2–0	1–4	1–3	5–2	3–5	2–0
Al-Ittihad	0–1		0–0	0–2	0–1	1–1	1–0	1–3	2–1	2–2	0–2	2–1	0–3
Al-Kamel Wa Al-Wafi	1–2	2–1		2–1	0–1	0–0	1–2	2–1	1–2	1–2	1–1	1–1	1–0
Al-Mudhaibi	1–1	0–0	2–1		2–2	1–0	0–1	1–0	0–0	1–1	1–0	1–0	0–2
Al-Rustaq	1–1	2–3	0–0	5–4		0–3	1–0	1–1	1–1	1–0	2–0	1–2	1–2
Al-Tali'aa	0–1	3–3	2–4	1–0	1–1		2–0	1–0	0–2	2–1	0–0	3–2	4–0
Al-Wahda	4–0	0–1	3–2	0–0	0–1	1–0		2–2	0–1	1–3	3–1	0–1	0–0
Mirbat	2–2	1–2	1–2	0–1	3–0	1–0	2–1		0–1	1–1	1–0	1–2	2–1
Muscat	6–0	2–0	3–1	3–0	0–0	2–0	4–1	4–0		1–2	2–1	2–1	0–0
Nizwa	1–1	0–3	2–1	5–1	1–2	1–3	2–1	0–0	0–2		2–1	1–4	3–0
Oman	1–0	1–0	2–2	0–0	0–1	3–1	1–1	3–0	1–0	1–2		2–0	3–1
Salalah	6–0	3–0	1–0	2–1	1–1	0–0	2–1	2–0	3–2	1–0	2–0		3–2
Samail	0–1	2–1	2–2	1–2	0–1	1–1	0–0	0–1	1–2	0–1	2–0	1–1	

Updated to match(es) played on 15 May 2015. Source: Results
Legend: Blue = home team win; Yellow = draw; Red = away team win.

== Clubs season-progress ==
Win
Draw
Lose

Team ╲ Round	1	2	3	4	5	6	7	8	9	10	11	12	13	14	15	16	17	18	19	20	21	22	23	24
Ahli Sidab	L	W	D	L	D	W	W	L	L	W	D	L	L	W	W	W	L	L	W	D	L	W	L	L
Al-Ittihad	W	L	W	W	L	L	D	W	W	L	W	D	L	L	L	L	D	L	L	L	W	L	L	D
Al-Kamel Wa Al-Wafi	D	W	W	L	D	W	D	D	L	W	L	L	W	W	D	L	D	D	L	L	L	L	L	L
Al-Mudhaibi	L	L	W	W	L	D	D	D	L	W	L	D	D	D	L	W	W	L	W	W	D	L	W	W
Al-Rustaq	D	W	W	L	D	D	W	W	D	W	D	W	L	W	W	W	L	W	D	D	D	W	L	L
Al-Tali'aa	D	D	L	W	W	L	W	D	W	D	D	W	W	W	D	L	L	L	L	W	L	W	L	D
Al-Wahda	W	W	L	D	D	L	L	D	L	L	L	W	W	D	L	D	L	W	L	W	L	L	L	W
Mirbat	L	L	D	L	L	D	W	D	L	L	D	L	L	L	L	L	L	L	W	W	D	W	W	W
Muscat	W	W	D	W	W	W	W	L	D	L	W	W	D	W	W	W	W	L	L	W	D	W	W	W
Nizwa	L	L	L	W	D	D	L	W	W	D	L	W	W	L	L	W	W	W	W	W	W	D	L	W
Oman	W	L	L	D	L	D	L	D	L	W	D	L	W	L	W	D	W	L	W	L	W	L	W	L
Salalah	W	D	W	W	L	D	D	W	L	W	W	W	W	L	W	L	W	W	W	W	W	L	W	D
Samail	D	L	L	D	D	L	D	L	W	W	L	L	L	L	W	L	D	L	L	L	L	W	W	D

Updated to match(es) played on 15 May 2015. Source: Clubs Season-Progress

== Promotion/relegation play-off ==
As of 31 May 2015

=== 1st leg ===
28 May 2015
20:15 UTC+4

Al-Rustaq	0 - 1	Sohar
		Al-Fazari 80'

Sultan Qaboos Sports Complex, Muscat, Oman

=== 2nd leg ===
31 May 2013
19:30 UTC+4

Sohar	1 - 1	Al-Rustaq
Al-Shaqsi 13'		Al-Shibli 17'

Sohar Regional Sports Complex, Sohar, Oman

Sohar secured promotion after winning 2-1 on aggregate

== OFA Awards ==
Oman Football Association awarded the following awards for the 2014-15 Oman Professional League season.

- Top Scorer: Aremu Philip (Salalah)
- Best Player: Vinicius Calamari Stephanie (Muscat)
- Best Goalkeeper: Mohammed Huwaidi Al-Hooti (Muscat)
- Best Coach: Mohammed Hawali (Muscat)
- Best Team Manager: Hamdan Bait Said (Salalah)
- Fair Play Award: Muscat

== Media coverage ==
Oman Professional League Media Coverage
Country	Television Channel	Matches
Oman	Oman Sports TV	1 Match per round

== Controversies ==
On 7 March 2015, 10 out of 39 clubs attending a consultative meeting of the OFA walked out in protest midway into the proceedings. walkout was triggered by the OFA's decision to call off an Extraordinary General Meeting (EGM), which was originally scheduled for 7 March 2015. However, the OFA which had previously agreed for an EGM, on 6 March 2015 shelved the summit, citing a letter from the FIFA, football's world governing body. On the very next day, the OFA cancelled the membership of 11 clubs (Ahli Sidab, Al-Ittifaq, Al-Kamel Wa Al-Wafi, Al-Musannah, Al-Seeb, Bowsher, Dhofar, Fanja, Ibri, Ja'lan and Nizwa) for illegally withdrawing from the consultative meeting conducted by the OFA.

== See also ==
- 2014–15 Oman Professional League
- 2014–15 Sultan Qaboos Cup
