= 2009–10 Oman Mobile League =

Oman Mobile League
- Season: 2009–10
- Champions: Al-Suwaiq
- Relegated: Al-Khaboura; Al-Seeb
- AFC Cup: Al-Suwaiq; Al-Oruba
- Matches: 132
- Goals: 297 (2.25 per match)
- Top goalscorer: (Oman) Ibrahim Al-Gheilani (11 goals)
- Biggest home win: Al-Shabab 5-0 Al-Khaboura (2 May 2010)
- Biggest away win: Al-Suwaiq 0-4 Al-Shabab (24 February 2010)
- Highest scoring: Dhofar 3-4 Al-Suwaiq (12 September 2009)
- Longest winning run: (9 games); Al-Suwaiq
- Longest unbeaten run: (13 games); Al-Suwaiq
- Longest losing run: (13 games); Saham

The 2009–10 Omani League (known as the Oman Mobile League for sponsorship reasons) was the 34th edition of the top football league in Oman. It began on 12 September 2009 and finished on 7 May 2010. Al-Nahda Club were the defending champions, having won the 2008–09 Oman League season. Al-Suwaiq Club played out a 1–1 draw away in their final league match against Al-Nasr S.C.S.C. and emerged as the champions of the 2009–10 Oman Mobile League with a total of 44 points.

== Teams ==
This season the league had 12 teams. Sur SC and Sohar SC were relegated to the Second Division League after finishing in the relegation zone in the 2008-09 season. The two relegated teams were replaced by Second Division League teams Al-Suwaiq Club and Oman Club.

=== Stadia and locations ===
Club	Home city	Stadium	Capacity
Al-Khaboura	Al-Khaboura	Sohar Regional Sports Complex	19,000
Al-Nahda	Al-Buraimi	Nizwa Sports Complex	10,000
Al-Nasr	Salalah	Al-Saada Stadium / Salalah Sports Complex	12,000 / 8,000
Al-Oruba	Sur	Sur Sports Complex	8,000
Al-Seeb	Seeb	Seeb Stadium	14,000
Al-Shabab	Barka	Seeb Stadium	14,000
Al-Suwaiq	Al-Suwaiq	Sohar Regional Sports Complex	19,000
Al-Tali'aa	Sur	Sur Sports Complex	8,000
Dhofar	Salalah	Al-Saada Stadium / Salalah Sports Complex	12,000 / 8,000
Muscat	Muscat	Sultan Qaboos Sports Complex / Royal Oman Police Stadium	39,000 / 18,000
Oman	Muscat	Sultan Qaboos Sports Complex / Royal Oman Police Stadium	39,000 / 18,000
Saham	Saham	Sohar Regional Sports Complex	19,000

== League table ==
As of 7 May 2010

Pos	Team	Pld	W	D	L	GF	GA	GD	Pts	Qualification or relegation
1	Al-Suwaiq (C)	22	13	5	4	30	18	+12	44	2011 AFC Cup group stage
2	Dhofar	22	12	5	5	33	26	+7	41	2011 GCC Champions League group stage
3	Al-Nahda	22	12	4	6	29	21	+8	40	
4	Muscat	22	7	9	6	26	22	+4	30	
5	Al Tali'aa	22	7	6	9	21	28	−7	27	
6	Saham	22	7	6	9	19	26	−7	27	2011 GCC Champions League group stage
7	Al-Nasr	22	6	8	8	25	27	−2	26	
8	Al-Shabab	22	7	4	11	30	25	+5	25	
9	Oman	22	6	7	9	27	29	−2	25	
10	Al-Oruba	22	6	7	9	18	22	−4	25	Relegation Playoff and 2011 AFC Cup group stage (Note: Al-Oruba was the second representative from Oman as the winners of 2010 Sultan Qaboos Cup)
11	Al-Khaboura (R)	22	5	9	8	20	27	−7	24	Relegation to 2010–11 Oman First Division League
12	Al-Seeb (R)	22	6	6	10	19	26	−7	24	Relegation to 2010–11 Oman First Division League

Updated to match(es) played on 7 May 2010. Source: League Table
Rules for classification: 1) points; 2) goal difference; 3) number of goals scored.
(C) Champions; (R) Relegated

== Results ==
Home \ Away	ALK	ALNH	ALN	ALO	ALS	ALSH	ALSU	ALT	DHO	MCT	OMA	SAH
Al-Khaboura		2–2	3–2	1–1	1–1	0–2	0–0	3–1	1–3	1–1	1–1	0–1
Al-Nahda	1–0		1–0	3–2	2–1	2–1	2–1	2–0	1–2	0–2	0–0	1–0
Al-Nasr	2–0	0–3		0–0	3–0	1–0	1–1	2–0	1–2	1–0	0–2	0–0
Al-Oruba	0–1	1–0	0–0		0–1	1–1	2–3	1–1	0–2	2–1	2–1	0–0
Al-Seeb	0–0	1–0	2–2	0–1		2–0	0–1	0–1	3–1	1–4	2–0	1–1
Al-Shabab	5–0	2–0	2–3	2–0	0–0		0–2	2–1	1–1	0–1	1–1	0–1
Al-Suwaiq	1–0	2–0	2–1	0–1	2–0	0–4		0–1	2–0	1–1	3–1	1–0
Al-Tali'aa	0–2	0–3	4–2	0–0	1–0	3–2	0–2		1–2	0–0	1–1	0–1
Dhofar	0–0	2–2	1–0	2–1	1–2	1–0	3–4	1–2		1–0	2–1	2–1
Muscat	1–1	0–0	1–1	0–2	2–0	2–1	1–1	0–0	2–2		3–1	1–2
Oman	2–1	1–2	1–1	1–0	2–2	1–3	0–1	0–2	1–1	3–0		4–0
Saham	0–2	1–2	2–2	2–1	1–0	2–1	0–0	2–2	0–1	1–3	1–2	

Updated to match(es) played on 7 May 2010. Source: Results
Legend: Blue = home team win; Yellow = draw; Red = away team win.

== Promotion/relegation play-off ==
=== 1st leg ===
18 May 2010
19:30 UTC+4

Al-Oruba	2 - 1	Fanja
Andreas Haddad 8', 89'	Report	Haitham Al-Alawi 17'

Sur Sports Complex, Sur, Oman

=== 2nd leg ===
13 May 2010
19:30 UTC+4

Fanja	0 - 0	Al-Oruba
	Report

Seeb Stadium, Seeb, Al Batinah, Oman

Al Oruba secured promotion after winning 2:1 on aggregate

== Season statistics ==
As of 7 May 2010

=== Top scorers ===
Rank	Scorer	Club	Goals
1	(Oman) Ibrahim Al-Gheilani	Al-Suwaiq	11
2	(Oman) Osama Subait	Al-Tali'aa	8
3	(Brazil) Leonardo	Al-Suwaiq	7
3	(Gabon) Etienne Bito'o	Dhofar	7
3	(Oman) Hani Al-Dhabit	Dhofar	7
3	(Oman) Hashim Saleh	Dhofar	7
7	(Oman) Hassan Zaher	Al-Nasr	6
7	(Cameroon) Makadji Boukar	Al-Nahda	6
7	(Oman) Mohammed Al-Mashaikhi	Al-Nahda	6
7	(Oman) Salim Al-Hasani	Al-Shabab	6
7	(Oman) Ammar Al-Busaidi	Oman	6

== Media coverage ==
Oman Mobile League Media Coverage
Country	Television Channel	Matches
Oman	Oman TV2	3 Matches per round

== See also ==
- 2009 Sultan Qaboos Cup
- 2009–10 Oman First Division League
