= 2011–12 Oman First Division League =

Oman First Division League
- Season: 2011–12
- Matches: 182
- Goals: 495 (2.72 per match)

The 2011–12 Oman First Division League (known as the Omantel First Division League for sponsorship reasons) was the 36th edition of the second-highest division overall football league in Oman. The season began on 5 October 2011 and concluded on 21 May 2012. Sur were the defending champions, having won their first title in the 2010–11 season.

== League table ==
Pos	Team	Pld	W	D	L	GF	GA	GD	Pts	Promotion or relegation
1	Saham	26	17	4	5	53	22	+31	55	Promotion to 2012–13 Oman Elite League
2	Al-Nasr	26	14	8	4	42	15	+27	50	Promotion to 2012–13 Oman Elite League
3	Al-Seeb	26	15	3	8	35	26	+9	48	Promotion Playoff
4	Al-Ittihad	26	13	6	7	45	31	+14	45	
5	Al-Salam	26	10	11	5	34	25	+9	41	
6	Muscat	26	11	6	9	40	37	+3	39	
7	Al-Bashaer	26	11	4	11	42	34	+8	37	
8	Sohar	26	9	6	11	36	39	−3	33	
9	Majees	26	7	10	9	35	45	−10	31	
10	Al-Khabourah	26	8	6	12	30	44	−14	30	
11	Al-Mudhaibi	26	6	8	12	20	34	−14	26	
11	Mirbat	26	6	7	13	25	41	−16	25	
13	Yanqul	26	5	6	15	32	54	−22	21	Relegation to 2012–13 Oman Second Division League
14	Bowsher	26	6	3	17	26	48	−22	21	Relegation to 2012–13 Oman Second Division League

Updated to match(es) played on 21 May 2012. Source: League Table
Rules for classification: 1) points; 2) goal difference; 3) number of goals scored.

== Promotion/relegation play-off ==
=== 1st leg ===
25 May 2012
19:30 UTC+4

Al-Seeb	1 - 1	Al-Hilal
Azwar Al-Farsi 13'	Report	Aman 42'

Sultan Qaboos Sports Complex, Muscat, Oman

=== 2nd leg ===
31 May 2012
19:30 UTC+4

Al-Hilal	2–3	Al-Seeb
Ali Al-Mahroon 11'; Roberto 30'	Report	Hamad Al-Qaidhi 6'; Moosa 43'; Abdulaziz Al-Nofali 88'

Al-Saada Stadium, Salalah, Oman

Al Seeb secured promotion after winning 4:3 on aggregate In the 2012–13 season the league had increased from 12 to 14 teams. As a result, despite losing the relegation play-off to Al-Seeb Club, Al-Hilal SC retained their place in the top division and Al-Musannah SC, whose 11th-place finish would have seen them relegated also retained their place in the top division.
