= 2012–13 Oman First Division League =

Oman First Division League
- Season: 2012–13
- Matches played: 198
- Goals scored: 498 (2.52 per match)

The 2012-13 Oman First Division League (known as the Omantel First Division League for sponsorship reasons) is the 37th edition of the second-highest division overall football league in Oman. The season began on 5 October 2012 and concluded on 10 May 2013. Saham were the defending champions, having won their first title in the 2011–12 season.

== League table ==
Pos	Team	Pld	W	D	L	GF	GA	GD	Pts	Promotion or relegation
1	Al-Ittihad	28	17	6	5	41	24	+17	57	Promotion to 2013–14 Oman Professional League
2	Majees	28	16	8	4	42	18	+24	56	Promotion to 2013–14 Oman Professional League
3	Sohar	28	16	7	5	53	30	+23	55	Promotion Playoff
4	Nizwa	28	13	9	6	41	26	+15	48	
5	Muscat	28	14	5	9	43	26	+17	47	
6	Bowsher	28	13	5	10	34	32	+2	44	
7	Al-Salam	28	12	6	10	39	28	+11	42	
8	Al-Khabourah	28	9	11	8	24	21	+3	38	
9	Al-Mudhaibi	28	9	9	10	26	33	−7	36	
10	Yanqul	28	9	7	12	35	42	−7	34	
11	Mirbat	28	10	4	14	31	42	−11	34	
11	Al-Wahda	28	10	4	14	27	39	−12	34	
13	Bahla	28	5	10	13	25	33	−8	25	Relegation to 2013–14 Oman Second Division League
14	Ahli Sidab	28	5	6	17	21	37	−16	21	Relegation to 2013–14 Oman Second Division League
15	Al-Bashaer	28	1	5	22	16	67	−51	8	Relegation to 2013–14 Oman Second Division League

Updated to match(es) played on 10 May 2013. Source: League Table
Rules for classification: 1) points; 2) goal difference; 3) number of goals scored.

== Promotion/relegation play-off ==
=== 1st leg ===
22 May 2013
19:30 UTC+4

Sohar	0–0	Al Tali'aa
	Report

Sohar Regional Sports Complex, Sohar, Oman

=== 2nd leg ===
25 May 2013
19:30 UTC+4

Al Tali'aa	1–1	Sohar
	Report

Sur Sports Complex, Sur, Oman

Sohar secured promotion after winning on the away goals rule
