= 2010 Sultan Qaboos Cup =

Tournament details
- Country: Oman
- Teams: 37

Final positions
- Champions: Al-Oruba
- Runners-up: Fanja

Tournament statistics
- Matches played: 42
- Goals scored: 111 (2.64 per match)
- Top goal scorer(s): (Brazil) Lorinko (5 goals)

The 2010 Sultan Qaboos Cup was the 38th edition of the Sultan Qaboos Cup (Arabic: كأس السلطان قابوس), the premier knockout tournament for football teams in Oman. This edition of the cup was nicknamed "Al-Kass Al-'Arba'een" (Arabic: الكأس الاربعين), literally meaning "The 40th Cup", due to the country's 40th anniversary of modernity (although the cup was in fact only in its 38th edition).

The competition began on 17 September 2010 with the qualification round and concluded on 12 December 2010. Saham SC were the defending champions, having won their first title in 2009. Al-Oruba SC were crowned the champions of the 2011 Sultan Qaboos Cup when they defeated Fanja SC 5–3 on penalties after the match had ended 1-1 after extra time, winning the title for the third time.

== Teams ==
This year the tournament had 37 teams. The winners qualified for the 2011 AFC Cup.

- Ahli Sidab Club (Sidab)
- Al-Bashaer Club
- Al-Ittihad Club (Salalah)
- Al-Kamel Wa Al-Wafi SC
- Al-Khaboora SC (Al-Khaboura)
- Al-Musannah SC (Al-Musannah)
- Al-Mudhaibi SC (Mudhaibi)
- Al-Nahda Club (Al-Buraimi)
- Al-Nasr S.C.S.C. (Salalah)
- Al-Oruba SC (Sur)
- Al-Rustaq SC (Rustaq)
- Al-Salam SC (Sohar)
- Al-Seeb Club (Seeb)
- Al-Shabab Club (Seeb)
- Al-Suwaiq Club (Suwaiq
- Al-Tali'aa SC (Sur)
- Al-Wahda SC (Sur)
- Bahla Club (Bahla)
- Bidia SC (Bidiya)
- Bowsher Club (Bawshar)
- Dhofar S.C.S.C. (Salalah)
- Fanja SC (Fanja)
- Ibri Club (Ibri)
- Ja'lan SC (Jalan Bani Bu Ali)
- Madha SC (Madha)
- Majees SC (Majees)
- Mirbat SC (Mirbat)
- Muscat Club (Muscat)
- Nizwa Club (Nizwa)
- Oman Club (Muscat)
- Quriyat Club (Quriyat)
- Saham SC (Saham)
- Salalah SC (Salalah)
- Sohar SC (Sohar)
- Sur SC (Sur)
- Yanqul SC (Yanqul)

== Qualification round ==
=== Round 1 ===
1 tie was played over one leg. Bowsher Club advanced to the Round 2 of qualification after defeating Ibri Club.

17 September 2010	Bowsher	8 – 1	Ibri

=== Round 2 ===
8 teams played a knockout tie. 4 ties were played over one leg. The first match was played between Al-Rustaq SC and Boshwer Club on 20 September 2010. Al-Rustaq SC, Yanqul SC, Nizwa Club and Al-Kamel Wa Al-Wafi SC advanced to the Round of 32 after winning their respective ties.

20 September 2010	Al-Rustaq	3 – 2	Bowsher

20 September 2010	Quriyat	1 – 3	Yanqul

20 September 2010	Bidia	1 – 2	Nizwa

20 September 2010	Al-Kamel Wa Al-Wafi	3 – 2	Madha

== Round of 32 ==
32 teams played a knockout tie. 16 ties were played over one leg. The draw for the round of 32 was held on 26 September 2010. The first match played was between Al-Bashaer Club and Nizwa Club on 3 October 2010. 16 teams advanced to the Round of 16.

3 October 2010	Al-Bashaer	1 – 0	Nizwa
18:40 UTC+4	Abdullah 49'

4 October 2010	Al-Mudhaibi	2 – 4	Al-Tali'aa
15:30 UTC+4

4 October 2010	Al-Khaboora	0 – 0 (4 – 3 p)	Saham
15:40 UTC+4

4 October 2010	Al-Nasr	0 – 1	Al-Shabab
17:25 UTC+4			Naeem Salim 51'

4 October 2010	Bahla	2 – 0	Al-Salam
18:40 UTC+4	Zakir 72'; Rashid Ghafri 74'

4 October 2010	Dhofar	3 – 0	Al-Wahda
20:15 UTC+4	Bito'o 12' (pen.), 60'; Osama 27'

5 October 2010	Majees	1 – 2	Fanja
15:40 UTC+4	Al-Mamari 84'		Adel 1'; Ayman 90+6'

5 October 2010	Al-Oruba	3 – 0	Oman
17:00 UTC+4	Al-Mukhaini; Kafi; Tchomogo

5 October 2010	Al-Suwaiq	1 – 2	Al-Nahda
18:30 UTC+4	Rabia		Rodrigo; Francis

5 October 2010	Samail	2 – 1	Ja'lan
18:40 UTC+4	Al-Nidabi 43'; Ahmed Khalfan 89'		Al-Hasani 81'

5 October 2010	Mirbat	2 – 1	Al-Kamel Wa Al-Wafi
18:45 UTC+4	Salim 69'; Abdullah 84'		Juma 25'

6 October 2010	Salalah	0 – 1	Yanqul
17:25 UTC+4			Hisham Khamis 37'

6 October 2010	Al-Seeb	5 – 1	Sohar
18:30 UTC+4

6 October 2010	Muscat	3 – 2	Al-Rustaq
18:30 UTC+4	Al-Shukaili 14'; Emad 60'		Taha 68'

6 October 2010	Sur	1 – 1 (5 – 6 p)	Al-Musannah
19:00 UTC+4	Bangora 17'		Khalil 90+2'

6 October 2010	Al-Ittihad	0 – 2	Ahli Sidab
20:15 UTC+4			Naif 75', 88'

== Round of 16 ==
16 teams played a knockout tie. 8 ties were played over one leg. The first match was played between Ahli Sidab Club and Yanqul SC on 14 October 2010. 8 teams advanced to the Quarterfinals.

14 October 2010	Ahli Sidab	2 – 0	Yanqul
18:25 UTC+4

15 October 2010	Samail	1 – 2	Al-Khaboora
17:00 UTC+4	Al-Nidabi 84'		Khalfan 8', 15'

15 October 2010	Al-Shabab	0 – 0 (4 – 3 p)	Al-Seeb
18:30 UTC+4			Al-Ajmi 45'

15 October 2010	Fanja	0 – 0 (4 – 1 p)	Al-Nahda
20:00 UTC+4

16 October 2010	Mirbat	3 – 4	Al-Tali'aa
17:15 UTC+4

16 October 2010	Bahla	0 – 2	Muscat
18:30 UTC+4			Ahmed Saleem (pen.); Manga

16 October 2010	Dhofar	2 – 0	Al-Bashaer
20:00 UTC+4			Hasan Salim; Saleh

21 October 2010	Al-Musannah	0 – 2	Al-Oruba
18:30 UTC+4			Kafi; Al-Wahaibi

== Quarterfinals ==
8 teams played a knockout tie. 4 ties were played over two legs. The first match was played between Al-Tali'aa SC and Dhofar S.C.S.C. on 22 October 2010. Dhofar S.C.S.C., Ahli Sidab Club, Fanja SC and Al-Oruba SC qualified for the Semifinals.

=== 1st Legs ===
22 October 2010	Al-Tali'aa	0 – 1	Dhofar	Sur Sports Complex, Sur, Oman
18:15 UTC+4			Saleh 32'

22 October 2010	Al-Shabab	0 – 1	Ahli Sidab	Al-Seeb Stadium, Al-Seeb, Al-Batinah, Oman
18:20 UTC+4			Ishaq 82'

22 October 2010	Fanja	1 – 1	Al-Khaboora	Nizwa Sports Complex, Nizwa, Oman
18:20 UTC+4	Al-Mahaijri (pen.)		Al-Hilmi

25 October 2010	Muscat	2 – 1	Al-Oruba
18:15 UTC+4	Emad 75'; Sulaiman Camara 90+1'		Al-Wahaibi 39'

=== 2nd Legs ===
28 October 2010	Ahli Sidab	0 – 1 (4 – 3 p)	Al-Shabab
18:15 UTC+4			Al-Mushaifri 53'

28 October 2010	Al-Khaboora	0 – 1 (4 – 3 p)	Fanja
18:15 UTC+4	Al-Muqbali 54'

29 October 2010	Al-Oruba	3 – 1	Muscat
18:15 UTC+4	Kafi 28', 90+28'; Al-Mukhaini 75'		Sulaiman Camara 5'

29 October 2010	Dhofar	1 – 1	Al-Tali'aa
18:00 UTC+4	Cédric 68'		Ya 82'

== Semifinals ==
4 teams played a knockout tie. 2 ties were played over two legs. The first match was played between Ahli Sidab Club and Fanja SC on 5 November 2010. Fanja SC and Al-Oruba SC qualified for the finals.

=== 1st Legs ===
5 November 2010	Ahli Sidab	1 – 1	Fanja	Al-Seeb Stadium, Al-Seeb, Al-Batinah, Oman
18:15 UTC+4	Al-Ward 74'		Abdullah 43'

5 November 2010	Dhofar	1 – 2	Al-Oruba
18:45 UTC+4	Osama 2'		Al-Mukhaini 63'; Al-Wahaibi 75'

=== 2nd Legs ===
9 November 2010	Fanja	0 – 0	Ahli Sidab	Al-Seeb Stadium, Al-Seeb, Al-Batinah, Oman
18:15 UTC+4

9 November 2010	Al-Oruba	0 – 1	Dhofar
18:15 UTC+4			Fahad Naseeb 85'

== Finals ==
12 December 2010	Fanja	1 – 1 (3 - 5 p)	Al-Oruba	Royal Oman Police Stadium, Muscat, Oman
19:00 UTC+4	Al-Hidaibi 39'		Hamad 46' (o.g.)
