= 2013–14 Oman First Division League =

Oman First Division League
- Season: 2014–15
- Matches played: 146
- Goals scored: 388 (2.66 per match)

The 2013-14 Oman First Division League (known as Omantel First Division League for sponsorship reasons) is the 38th edition of the second-highest division overall football league in Oman. The season began on 12 September 2013 and concluded on 24 April 2014. Al-Ittihad Club were the defending champions, having won their first title in the previous 2012–13 season.

== League table ==
Pos	Team	Pld	W	D	L	GF	GA	GD	Pts	Promotion or relegation
1	Al-Khabourah	24	15	6	3	38	14	+24	51	Promotion to 2014–15 Oman Professional League
2	Bowsher	24	13	8	3	43	26	+17	47	Promotion to 2014–15 Oman Professional League
3	Al-Mudhaibi	24	12	3	9	36	25	+11	39	Promotion Playoff
4	Mirbat	24	8	10	6	24	24	0	34	
5	Muscat	24	8	9	7	31	29	+2	33	
6	Oman	24	8	7	9	28	26	+2	31	
7	Salalah	24	6	10	8	31	33	−2	28	
8	Samail	24	8	4	12	25	31	−6	28	
9	Nizwa	24	6	9	9	28	34	−6	27	
10	Al-Tali'aa	24	6	8	10	31	41	−10	26	
11	Al-Wahda	24	5	11	8	24	37	−13	26	
12	Al-Kamel Wa Al-Wafi	24	6	7	11	21	30	−9	25	
13	Yanqul	24	6	6	12	25	35	−10	24	Relegation to 2014–15 Oman Second Division League

Updated to match(es) played on 24 April 2014. Source: League Table
Rules for classification: 1) points; 2) goal difference; 3) number of goals scored.

== Promotion/relegation play-off ==
=== 1st leg ===
19 May 2014
18:00 UTC+4

Al-Mudhaibi	0 – 1	Al-Nasr
		Said 65'

Seeb Stadium, Seeb, Oman

=== 2nd leg ===
23 May 2013
19:30 UTC+4

Al-Nasr	2 - 0	Al-Mudhaibi
Said 6', 90+5'

Al-Saada Stadium, Salalah, Oman
