= Rafael Nascimento =

Brazilian footballer

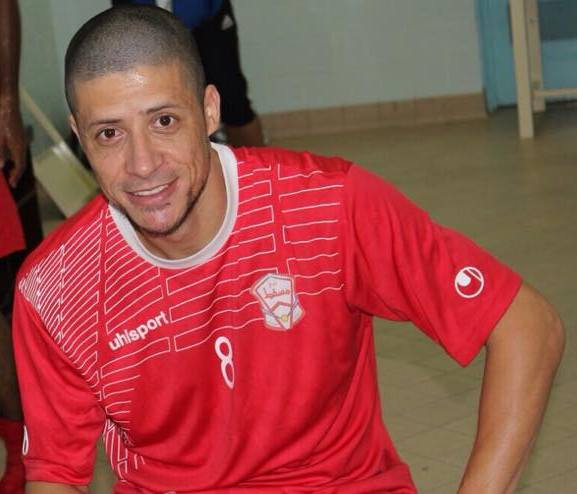
- Nascimento in the Muscat Club

Personal information
- Full name: Rafael da Silva Nascimento
- Date of birth: 21 May 1984 (age 42)
- Height: 1.82 m (6 ft 0 in)
- Position: Attacking midfielder

Team information
- Current team: Oman
- Number: 8

Youth career
- 1999–2001: Olaria

Senior career*
Years	Team	Apps	(Gls)
2001–2003	Olaria		
2003–2009	Vasco da Gama		
2008	→ Bahia (loan)	?	(1)
2009	→ Mesquita (loan)	6	(1)
2009	ABC	6	(0)
2010	Duque de Caxias	1	(0)
2011–2013	Saham	?	(?)
2013–2014	Al-Urooba	8	(1)
2014–2015	Muscat	24	(5)
2015–	Oman		
- * Club domestic league appearances and goals

Rafael da Silva Nascimento (born 21 May 1984), is a Brazilian footballer who plays for Oman Club in Oman First Division League.

== Club career ==
=== Olaria ===
Nascimento began his professional footballing career in Brazil with his parent club Olaria Atlético Clube, based in his hometown, Rio de Janeiro. After spending a two-year spell in the youth teams of the club, he got promoted to the first team in 2001 and player there for the next 2 years.

=== Vasco da Gama ===
In 2003, Nascimento signed a long-term contract with another Rio de Janeiro-based and Brazilian top club, CR Vasco da Gama.

=== Bahia ===
In 2008, Nascimento moved on loan from Vasco da Gama on a six-month deal to Salvador, Bahia-based Esporte Clube Bahia. He scored his only goal for the club on 16 August 2008 in a Campeonato Brasileiro Série B match against Sociedade Esportiva do Gama. He helped the Bahia-based club achieve the runners-up position in the 2008 Campeonato Baiano.

=== Mesquita ===
In 2009, Nascimento moved back to Rio de Janeiro and more accurately to Mesquita where he was signed by Mesquita Futebol Clube on a short-term loan deal from Vasco da Gama. He made his debut for the club on 13 March 2009 in a 5-1 loss against Americano Futebol Clube and scored his first and only goal on 31 March 2009 in a 4-2 loss against Duque de Caxias Futebol Clube. He scored 1 goal in 6 appearances for the Mesquita-based club in the 2009 Campeonato Carioca.

=== ABC ===
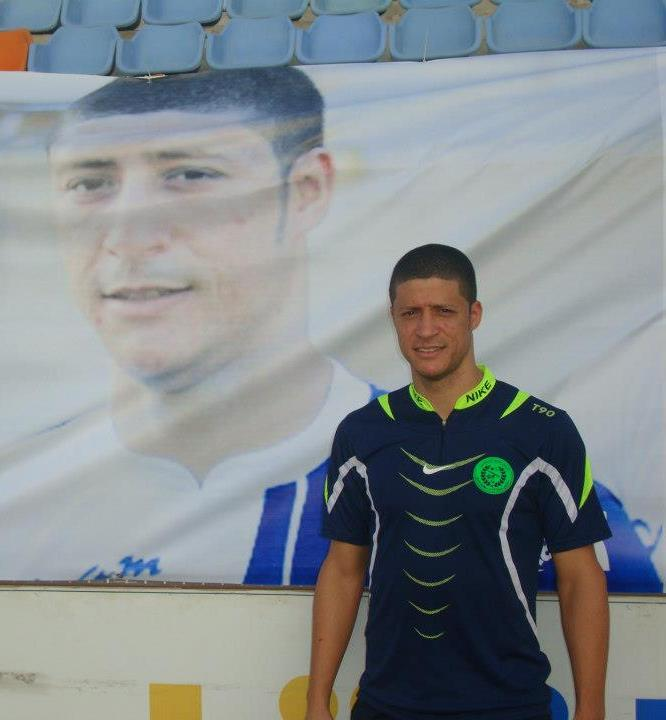
Rafael Nascimento - Saham SC

Later in 2009, Nascimento moved to Natal, Rio Grande do Norte where he signed a short-term contract with Campeonato Brasileiro Série B club, ABC Futebol Clube. He made his debut for the club on 13 June 2009 in a 1-0 win over Vila Nova Futebol Clube. He made 6 appearances for the Natal-based club in the 2009 Campeonato Brasileiro Série B.

=== Duque de Caxias ===
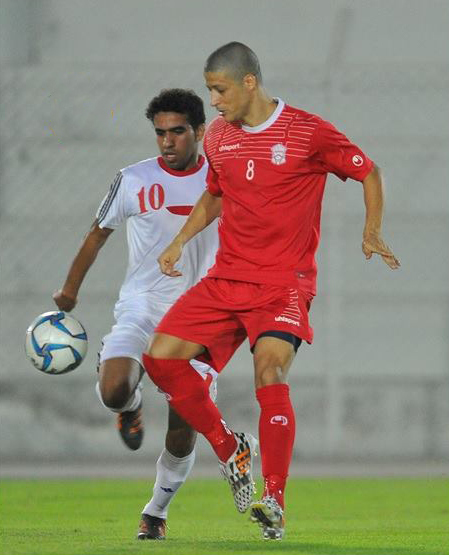
Rafael Nascimento - Muscat Club

In 2010, Nascimento moved to Duque de Caxias, Rio de Janeiro where he signed a one-year contract with Campeonato Carioca club, Duque de Caxias Futebol Clube. He made only one appearance for the club on 3 February 2010 in a 1-1 draw against Volta Redonda Futebol Clube when he came on as a substitute for Vander Sacramento Vieira at the 71st minute of the game.

=== Saham ===
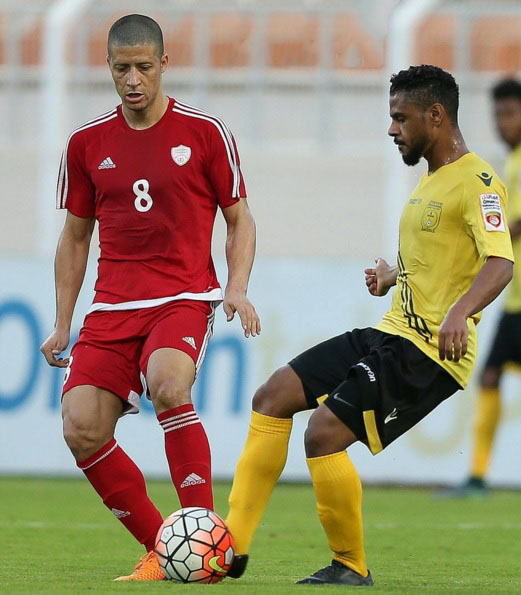
Rafael Nascimento - 2015–16 Sultan Qaboos Cup

Saham SC

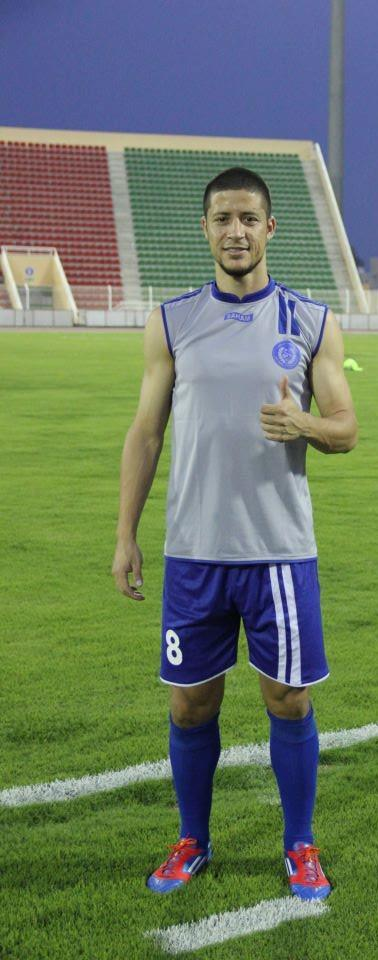

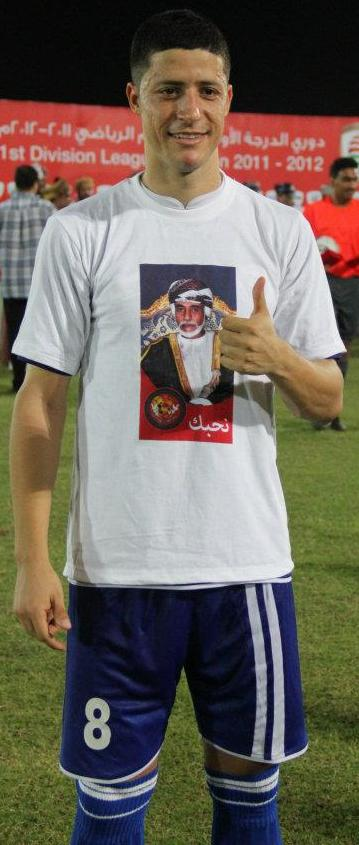

Nascimento first moved out of Brazil in 2011 to the Middle East and more accurately to Oman where he signed a two-year contract with Oman First Division League club, Saham SC. He helped the club win the 2011-12 Oman First Division League and in promotion to the 2012–13 Oman Elite League. In the 2012–13, he again put up an eye catching performance for the Saham-based club as he helped them secure the 3rd position in the 2012–13 Oman Elite League which earned the club a spot in the 2014 GCC Champions League.

=== Al-Urooba ===
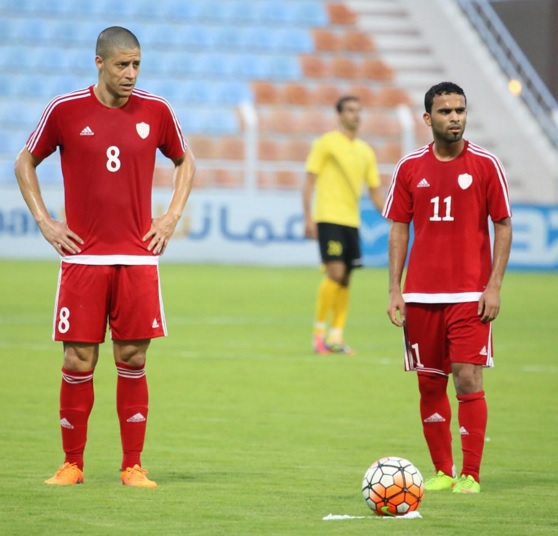
Rafael Nascimento - 2015–16 Sultan Qaboos Cup

In 2013, Nascimento moved to the neighbor country to Oman, the United Arab Emirates where he signed a one-year contract with UAE First Division League club, Al-Urooba. He made his debut for the club on 7 September 2013 in a 2013–14 UAE President's Cup qualification match in a 4-0 win over Masafi Club and scored his first goal in the same competition on 28 September 2013 in a 3-1 win over Masafi Club. He made his UAE First Division League debut on 9 November 2013 in a 6-1 win over Al-Taawon C.S. Club and scored his first goal in the competition on 26 December 2013 in a 2-2 draw against Dibba Al-Hisn Sports Club.

=== Muscat ===
In 2014, Nascimento returned to Oman and more accurately to Muscat, the capital city where he signed a one-year contract with Oman First Division League club, Muscat Club. He scored 5 goals in 24 appearances in the 2014–15 Oman First Division League and helped his club win their maiden Oman First Division League title in the 2014-15 season.

=== Oman ===
On 1 September 2015, Nascimento signed a one-year contract with another Oman First Division League club, Oman Club.

=== Club career statistics ===
Club	Season	Division	League		Cup		Continental		Other		Total	
Club	Season	Division	Apps	Goals	Apps	Goals	Apps	Goals	Apps	Goals	Apps	Goals
Mesquita	2009	Campeonato Carioca	6	1	0	0	0	0	0	0	6	1
Mesquita	Total		6	1	0	0	0	0	0	0	6	1
ABC	2009	Campeonato Brasileiro Série B	6	0	0	0	0	0	0	0	6	0
ABC	Total		6	0	0	0	0	0	0	0	6	0
Duque de Caxias	2010	Campeonato Carioca	1	0	0	0	0	0	0	0	1	0
Duque de Caxias	Total		1	0	0	0	0	0	0	0	1	0
Al-Urooba	2013-14	UAE First Division League	8	1	6	1	0	0	0	0	14	2
Al-Urooba	Total		8	1	6	1	0	0	0	0	14	2
Muscat	2014-15	Oman First Division League	24	5	0	0	0	0	0	0	24	5
Muscat	Total		24	5	0	0	0	0	0	0	24	5
Oman	2015-16	Oman First Division League	6	0	0	0	0	0	0	0	6	0
Oman	Total		6	0	0	0	0	0	0	0	6	0
Career total			51	7	6	1	0	0	0	0	57	8

== Honours ==
=== Club ===
- With Bahia

- Campeonato Baiano (0): Runner-up 2008

- With Saham

- Oman First Division League (1): 2011-12

- With Muscat

- Oman First Division League (1): 2014-15
