= 2010–11 Oman First Division League =

Oman First Division League
- Season: 2010–11
- Champions: Sur
- Matches played: 119
- Goals scored: 281 (2.36 per match)

The 2010–11 Oman First Division League (known as the Omantel First Division League for sponsorship reasons) was the 35th edition of the second-highest division overall football league in Oman. The season began on 3 November 2010 and concluded on 21 April 2011. Ahli Sidab Club were the defending champions, having won their first title in the 2009–10 season.

== Group stage ==
As of 21 April 2011

=== Group A ===
Team	Pld	W	D	L	GF	GA	GD	Pts
(Oman) Fanja	14	7	6	1	21	4	+17	27
(Oman) Majees	14	8	1	5	22	19	+3	25
(Oman) Al-Salam	14	7	4	3	16	12	+4	25
(Oman) Al-Mudhaibi	14	4	7	3	20	17	+3	19
(Oman) Al-Khabourah	14	5	4	5	16	16	0	19
(Oman) Mirbat	14	5	4	5	14	14	0	19
(Oman) Bahla	14	3	2	9	15	25	−10	11
(Oman) Samail	14	1	4	9	8	25	−17	7

=== Group B ===
Team	Pld	W	D	L	GF	GA	GD	Pts
(Oman) Sur	14	8	5	1	21	10	+11	29
(Oman) Al-Musannah	14	7	7	0	24	9	+15	28
(Oman) Al-Seeb	14	8	2	4	22	17	+5	26
(Oman) Sohar	14	7	4	3	23	14	+9	25
(Oman) Al-Ittihad	14	2	6	6	15	19	−4	12
(Oman) Al-Bashaer	14	3	2	9	11	19	−8	11
(Oman) Al-Wahda	14	2	4	8	11	22	−11	10
(Oman) Ja'lan	14	2	4	8	10	27	−17	10

== Semifinals ==
4 teams played a knockout tie. 2 ties were played over two legs. The first match was played between Majees SC and Sur SC on 8 April 2011.

=== 1st Legs ===
8 April 2011	Majees	0 - 2	Sur	Al-Seeb Stadium, Al-Seeb, Oman
17:40 UTC+4

8 April 2011	Al-Musannah	1 - 0	Fanja	Al-Seeb Stadium, Al-Seeb, Oman
20:00 UTC+4

=== 2nd Legs ===
14 April 2011	Sur	1 - 1	Majees	Sur Sports Complex, Sur, Oman
19:00 UTC+4

15 April 2011	Fanja	0 - 4	Al-Musannah	Al-Seeb Stadium, Al-Seeb, Oman
19:00 UTC+4

== 3/4th Place match ==
21 April 2011	Majees	1 - 2	Fanja	Al-Seeb Stadium, Al-Seeb, Oman
17:00 UTC+4

== Finals ==
21 April 2011	Sur	0 - 0 (a.e.t.) (5–3 p)	Al-Musannah	Al-Seeb Stadium, Al-Seeb, Oman
17:00 UTC+4

== Promotion/relegation play-off ==
=== 1st leg ===
5 May 2011
19:20 UTC+4

Fanja	0 - 1	Muscat
	Report

Nizwa Sports Complex, Nizwa, Oman

=== 2nd leg ===
12 May 2011
19:20 UTC+4

Muscat	1 - 2 (a.e.t.)	Fanja
	Report

Seeb Stadium, Seeb, Al Batinah, Oman

Fanja secured promotion after winning by away goals rule (2-2).
