= Hashim Saleh =

Omani footballer (born 1981)

Personal information
- Full name: Hashim Saleh Mohammed Al-Balushi
- Date of birth: 15 October 1981 (age 45)
- Place of birth: Oman
- Height: 1.63 m (5 ft 4 in)
- Position: Striker

Senior career*
Years	Team	Apps	(Gls)
1998–2004	Al-Nasr	?	(3)
2004–2005	Dhofar	?	(4)
2006	Al-Shamal	?	(8)
2006–2007	Al-Wakra	?	(3)
2007	Dhofar	?	(1)
2008	Al-Tadamun	?	(0)
2008	Al-Suwaiq	?	(0)
2009	→ Kazma (Loan)	?	(1)
2009–2011	Dhofar	?	(21)
2011–2013	Al-Shabab	?	(8)
2013–2014	Dhofar	?	(1)
2014–2018	Salalah		

International career
2001–2011	Oman	26	(17)
- * Club domestic league appearances and goals

Hashim Saleh Mohammed Al-Balushi (Arabic: هَاشِم صَالِح مُحَمَّد الْبَلُوشِيّ; born 15 October 1981), commonly known as Hashim Saleh, is an Omani footballer. He also played for the Oman national team for a decade.

== Club career ==
Hashim has been wearing the number 9 jersey for clubs like Al-Nasr S.C.S.C. to rivals Dhofar S.C.S.C. In 2008, he returned to Oman and signed for Al-Suwaiq Club but then later returned to Dhofar. During his brief stay at Al-Suwaiq Club, he led them to victory in the Sultan Qaboos Cup final against Al-Nahda Club. After his return to Dhofar, he again lead his club to the final but unfortunately losing to a lower-leveled Saham SC. In 2010 Hashim Saleh renewed his contract with Dhofar, extending his stay with the club for another season and then later played for them till the 2010–11 season. In 2011, he moved to Barka based club Al-Shabab Club and played for two seasons scoring 8 goals. On 27 July 2013, he signed a contract with his former club Dhofar S.C.S.C. On 13 July 2014, he signed a one-year contract with Oman First Division League side Salalah SC.

He has also played for Kuwaiti clubs like Al-Shamal Sports Club, Al-Tadamun SC and Kazma Sporting Club and has also spent a year with Al-Wakrah Sport Club of Qatar.

== International career ==
=== Arabian Gulf Cup ===
Hashim has made appearances in the 16th Arabian Gulf Cup, the 17th Arabian Gulf Cup, the 18th Arabian Gulf Cup and the 19th Arabian Gulf Cup.

He first showed his talent during the 16th Arabian Gulf Cup in 2003, scoring a goal in a 2–0 win over the United Arab Emirates. In the tournament, Oman finished at the fourth place, hence reaching its best ever position in the Arabian Gulf Cup competition, reaching the final four round for the first time, with eight points from two wins and two draws.

In the 18th Arabian Gulf Cup in 2007, he scored a magnificent goal in a 2–1 win over Kuwait. This goal stunned Kuwait and it was regarded by many as "the best goal in the competition". This was the second time when Oman reached to the finals but again they lost to the hosts, the United Arab Emirates. Ismail Matar, the Emirati legend, scored the lone goal of the match as United Arab Emirates won their first ever Arabian Gulf Cup.

Finally in 2009, he helped his team to win their first ever Arabian Gulf Cup trophy.

=== AFC Asian Cup Qualification ===
Hashim has made appearances in the 2004 AFC Asian Cup qualification, the 2004 AFC Asian Cup, the 2007 AFC Asian Cup qualification, the 2007 AFC Asian Cup and the 2011 AFC Asian Cup qualification.

He scored two goals in the 2004 AFC Asian Cup qualification, one in a 6–0 win over Nepal and another in a 3–1 win over South Korea hence helping his team to qualify for the 2004 AFC Asian Cup. In the tournament, Oman won four points in a 2–0 win over Thailand and a 2–2 draw against Iran and hence failed to qualify for the quarter-finals.

In the 2007 AFC Asian Cup qualification, he scored one goal in a 3–0 win over Jordan and again helped his team to qualify for the 2007 AFC Asian Cup. Badar Al-Maimani scored one and the only goal of Oman in the 2007 AFC Asian Cup in a 1–1 draw against Australia. In the tournament, Oman won two points in a 1–1 draw against Australia and in a 1–1 draw against Iraq and hence failed to qualify for the quarter-finals.

=== FIFA World Cup Qualification ===
Hashim has made four appearances in the 2002 FIFA World Cup qualification, four in the 2006 FIFA World Cup qualification, five in the 2010 FIFA World Cup qualification and has represented the national team in the 2014 FIFA World Cup qualification.

His only goal for Oman in FIFA World Cup qualification came in the first round of 2010 FIFA World Cup in a 2–0 win over Nepal.

== Career statistics ==
=== Club ===
Club	Season	Division	League		Cup		Continental		Other (Note: Includes goals in the Arab Champions League, GCC Champions League and Elite Championship Oman)		Total	
Club	Season	Division	Apps	Goals	Apps	Goals	Apps	Goals	Apps	Goals	Apps	Goals
Al-Nasr	2003–04	Omani League	-	3	-	2	0	0	-	1	-	6
Al-Nasr	Total		-	3	-	2	0	0	-	1	-	6
Dhofar	2004–05	Omani League	-	4	-	3	0	0	-	1	-	8
Dhofar	Total		-	4	-	3	0	0	-	1	-	8
Al-Shamal	2005–06	Qatar Stars League	-	8	-	2	0	0	-	0	-	10
Al-Shamal	Total		-	8	-	2	0	0	-	0	-	10
Al-Wakra	2006–07	Qatar Stars League	-	3	-	0	0	0	-	0	-	3
Al-Wakra	Total		-	3	-	0	0	0	-	0	-	3
Dhofar	2007–08	Omani League	-	1	-	2	0	0	-	0	-	3
Dhofar	Total		-	1	-	2	0	0	-	0	-	3
Al-Tadamun	2007–08	Kuwaiti Premier League	-	0	-	6	0	0	-	0	-	6
Al-Tadamun	Total		-	0	-	6	0	0	-	0	-	6
Al-Suwaiq	2008–09	Omani League	-	2	-	0	0	0	-	0	-	2
Al-Suwaiq	Total		-	2	-	0	0	0	-	0	-	2
Kazma	2008–09	Kuwaiti Premier League	-	1	-	1	0	0	-	0	-	2
Kazma	Total		-	1	-	1	0	0	-	0	-	2
Dhofar	2009–10	Omani League	-	7	-	2	0	0	-	0	-	9
Dhofar	2010–11	Omani League	-	7	-	4	0	0	-	2	-	13
Dhofar	Total		-	14	-	6	0	0	-	2	-	22
Al-Shabab	2011–12	Oman Elite League	-	7	-	2	0	0	-	0	-	9
Al-Shabab	2012–13	Oman Elite League	-	8	-	0	0	0	-	0	-	8
Al-Shabab	Total		-	15	-	2	0	0	-	0	-	17
Dhofar	2013–14	Oman Professional League	-	1	-	1	0	0	-	0	-	2
Dhofar	Total		-	1	-	1	0	0	-	0	-	2
Career total			-	41	-	15	0	0	-	3	-	61

=== International ===
Scores and results list Oman's goal tally first.

#	Date	Venue	Opponent	Score	Result	Competition
1	10 October 2003	Muscat, Oman	Jordan	2–1	2-1	Friendly
2	19 October 2003	Muscat, Oman	Nepal	6–0	6-0	2004 AFC Asian Cup qualification
3	21 October 2003	Sultan Qaboos Sports Complex, Muscat, Oman	South Korea	3–1	3-1	2004 AFC Asian Cup qualification
4	17 December 2003	Muscat, Oman	Azerbaijan	1–0	1-0	Friendly
5	20 December 2003	Muscat, Oman	Estonia	1–0	3-1	Friendly
6	20 December 2003	Muscat, Oman	Estonia	2–1	3-1	Friendly
7	31 December 2003	Al-Sadaqua Walsalam Stadium, Adiliya, Kuwait City, Kuwait	United Arab Emirates	2–0	2-0	16th Arabian Gulf Cup
8	11 October 2005	Al Ain City, UAE	United Arab Emirates	1–1	2-2	Friendly
9	11 October 2005	Al Ain City, UAE	United Arab Emirates	2–2	2-2	Friendly
10	6 February 2006	Doha, Qatar	Singapore	1–0	1-0	Friendly
11	1 March 2006	Royal Oman Police Stadium, Muscat, Oman	Jordan	2–0	3-0	2007 AFC Asian Cup qualification
12	20 January 2007	Zayed Sports City Stadium, Abu Dhabi, UAE	Kuwait	2–1	2-1	18th Arabian Gulf Cup
13	28 October 2008	Dasarath Rangasala Stadium, Kathmandu, Nepal	Nepal	1–0	2-0	2010 FIFA World Cup qualification
14	9 August 2008	Takhti Stadium (Tehran), Tehran, Iran	Syria	1–1	1-2	2008 WAFF Championship
15	10 September 2008	Muscat, Oman	Zimbabwe	1–1	3-2	Friendly
16	17 December 2008	Muscat, Oman	China	2–1	3-1	Friendly
17	17 December 2008	Muscat, Oman	China	3–1	3-1	Friendly
