= Hani Al-Dhabit =

Omani footballer (born 1979)

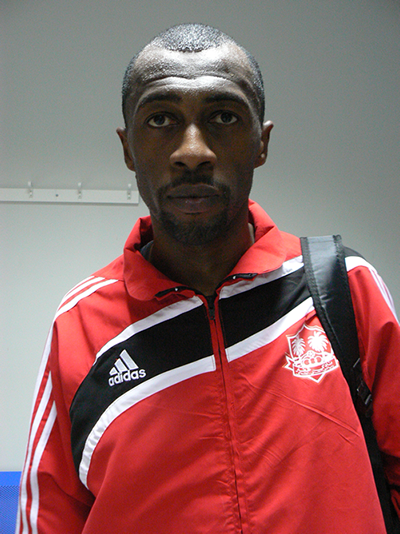
- Al-Dhabit with Dhofar in 2009

Personal information
- Full name: Hani Al-Dhabit Faraj Bait Al-Noobi
- Date of birth: 15 October 1979 (age 47)
- Place of birth: Salalah, Oman
- Height: 1.86 m (6 ft 1 in)
- Position: Attacking midfielder

Youth career
- 1992–1996: Dhofar

Senior career*
Years	Team	Apps	(Gls)
1996–2001	Dhofar	165	(81)
2002–2002	Baniyas	30	(19)
2002–2003	Al-Sadd	8	(1)
2003–2004	Dhofar	23	(2)
2005	Al-Jahra	8	(2)
2005–2015	Dhofar	210	(105)

International career
1998–2014	Oman	102	(43)
2008–????	Oman Beach Soccer		
- * Club domestic league appearances and goals

Hani Al-Dhabit Faraj Bait Al-Noobi (Arabic: هَانِي الضَّابِط فَرَج بَيْت النُّوبِيّ; born 15 October 1979), commonly known as Hani Al-Dhabit, is an Omani former professional footballer who plays as an attacking midfielder. He also played for the Oman national team.

== Club career ==
Hani Al-Dhabit is a long-time veteran of Omani football club, Dhofar S.C.S.C., and was in the squad for over 10 years. He was the captain of Dhofar and wore the number 14 jersey, as he had previously worn throughout his career with the national team.

He also played for various clubs in GCC; for example Baniyas SC of theUnited Arab Emirates, Al Sadd SC of Qatar, and Al Jahra SC of Kuwait.

== International career ==
He played for the Oman national football team from 1998 to 2008 and was the captain of the team in 2002 and 2003. His most successful season for the national team was during 2001–02, and he was the world's leading goalscorer in international matches in 2001.

=== Arabian Gulf Cup ===
Al-Dhabit made appearances in the 14th Arabian Gulf Cup, the 15th Arabian Gulf Cup, the 16th Arabian Gulf Cup and the 17th Arabian Gulf Cup.

In the 14th Arabian Gulf Cup in 1998, despite his young age, he scored a goal in a 2–2 draw against Bahrain. In the tournament, Oman finished at the fourth place with four points from one win and one draw.

He first showed his talent during the 15th Arabian Gulf Cup in 2002 scoring five goals, a hat-trick in a 3–1 win over the powerhouse 9-time competition winners, a goal in a 1–2 loss against Qatar and another in a 1–1 draw against Bahrain. At the end of the competition, he was awarded the "Top Goal Scorer" award. In the tournament, Oman finished at the fifth place with four points from one win and one draw.

Although not being successful in scoring any goals in both the 16th Arabian Gulf Cup and the 17th Arabian Gulf Cup, he still made many appearances and was handed the captain's band once again in the 16th Arabian Gulf Cup in 2003–04. This time Al-Dhabit led Oman to its most successful position ever yet in the Arabian Gulf Cup competition, reaching the final four round for the first time with eight points from two wins and two draws.

During the 17th Arabian Gulf Cup in 2004, he was not assigned captaincy by Czech coach Milan Macala. He was featured widely as a substitute, but still received an adequate amount of playing time, and scored a goal in the penalty-kick shootout during the final in which Oman lost to the hosts Qatar in a penalty shootout after the goalkeeping sensation Ali Al-Habsi missed a penalty. Qatar won the match 6–5 on penalties after the match had ended 1–1 at the normal time. Amad Al-Hosni was awarded the "Top Goal Scorer" award of the competition with a total of four goals.

=== AFC Asian Cup qualification ===
Al-Dhabit scored five goals in the qualification for the 2004 AFC Asian Cup, one in a 7–0 win over Nepal, a brace in a 6–0 win over Vietnam, other in a 3–1 win over South Korea and another in a 2–0 win over Vietnam hence helping his team to qualify for the 2004 AFC Asian Cup. In the tournament, Oman won four points in a 2–0 win over Thailand and a 2–2 draw against Iran and hence failed to qualify for the quarter-finals.

=== FIFA World Cup qualification ===
Al-Dhabit made fourteen appearances in 2002 FIFA World Cup qualification and represented the national team in 2010 FIFA World Cup qualification.

He scored eleven goals in 2002 FIFA World Cup qualification, five goals in a 12–0 win over Laos, a brace in the return leg in a 7–0 win over Laos, a brace in a 7–0 win over Philippines and another in a 2–2 draw against the United Arab Emirates. During the qualifications, Oman had scored some of the most goals in the shortest period of time, with the largest margin wins in the team's history. Many of the goals were scored by Al-Dhabit.

After eventually being knocked out of qualification, Al-Dhabit had scored a total of 11 goals in 4 matches out of the 12 matches Oman had played. In one match, he was on the brink of a double hat-trick but unfortunately he couldn't. At the end of the year, he was awarded the 2001 Top Goal Scorer Award with a total of 22 international goals, beating Spain's Raúl, England's Michael Owen, and Portugal's Luís Figo, becoming the first Omani and only third Arab, to win the title.

== Career statistics ==
=== Club ===
Appearances and goals by club, season and competition
Club	Season	League			Cup		Continental (Note: Includes appearances in the AFC Cup)		Other (Note: Includes goals in the GCC Champions League and the Al-Karamah SC International Championship)		Total	
Club	Season	Division	Apps	Goals	Apps	Goals	Apps	Goals	Apps	Goals	Apps	Goals
Dhofar	2003–04	Omani League		2		2	0	0		0		4
Al-Jahra	2004–05	Kuwaiti Premier League		2		0	0	0		0		2
Dhofar	2004–05	Oman Elite League		1		3	0	0		0		4
Dhofar	2005–06	Oman Elite League		2		1	0	0		0		3
Dhofar	2006–07	Oman Elite League		6		0		1		0		7
Dhofar	2007–08	Oman Elite League		8		1	0	0		4		12
Dhofar	2008–09	Oman Elite League		7		0	0	0		0		7
Dhofar	2009–10	Oman Elite League		7		0	0	0		0		7
Dhofar	2010–11	Oman Elite League		1		3	0	0		1		5
Dhofar	2011–12	Oman Elite League		3		5	0	0		0		8
Dhofar	2012–13	Oman Elite League		2		0	5	1		0		3
Dhofar	Total			37		13		2		5		55
Career total				41		15		2		5		63

=== International ===
Scores and results list Oman's goal tally first, score column indicates score after each Al-Dhabit goal.

List of international goals scored by Hani Al-Dhabit
No.	Date	Venue	Opponent	Score	Result	Competition
1	16 July 1998	Beirut, Lebanon	Lebanon	1–1	1–1	1997 Pan Arab Games
2	12 November 1998	Al Ahli Stadium, Manama, Bahrain	Bahrain	2–1	2–2	14th Arabian Gulf Cup
3	30 November 1998	Supachalasai Stadium, Bangkok, Thailand	Hong Kong	3–0	6–0	1998 Asian Games
4	30 November 1998	Supachalasai Stadium, Bangkok, Thailand	Hong Kong	5–0	6–0	1998 Asian Games
5	30 November 1998	Supachalasai Stadium, Bangkok, Thailand	Hong Kong	6–0	6–0	1998 Asian Games
6	8 December 1998	Supachalasai Stadium, Bangkok, Thailand	Iran	3–1	4–2	1998 Asian Games
7	10 December 1998	Supachalasai Stadium, Bangkok, Thailand	China	1–5	1–6	1998 Asian Games
8	19 August 1999	Amman, Jordan	Syria	1–1	1–1	1999 Pan Arab Games
9	29 October 2000	Muscat, Oman	Yemen	?–0	4–0	Friendly
10	29 October 2000	Muscat, Oman	Yemen	?–0	4–0	Friendly
11	31 October 2000	Muscat, Oman	Yemen	?–0	4–0	Friendly
12	21 November 2000	Muscat, Oman	Bahrain		2–1	Friendly
13	25 February 2001	Muscat, Oman	Maldives	?–0	5–0	Friendly
14	25 February 2001	Muscat, Oman	Maldives	?–0	5–0	Friendly
15	25 February 2001	Muscat, Oman	Maldives	?–0	5–0	Friendly
16	27 March 2001	Muscat, Oman	United Arab Emirates		2–1	Friendly
17	30 April 2001	Sultan Qaboos Sports Complex, Muscat, Oman	Laos	1–0	12–0	2002 FIFA World Cup qualification
18	30 April 2001	Sultan Qaboos Sports Complex, Muscat, Oman	Laos	3–0	12–0	2002 FIFA World Cup qualification
19	30 April 2001	Sultan Qaboos Sports Complex, Muscat, Oman	Laos	4–0	12–0	2002 FIFA World Cup qualification
20	30 April 2001	Sultan Qaboos Sports Complex, Muscat, Oman	Laos	7–0	12–0	2002 FIFA World Cup qualification
21	30 April 2001	Sultan Qaboos Sports Complex, Muscat, Oman	Laos	8–0	12–0	2002 FIFA World Cup qualification
22	4 May 2001	Sultan Qaboos Sports Complex, Muscat, Oman	Laos	1–0	7–0	2002 FIFA World Cup qualification
23	4 May 2001	Sultan Qaboos Sports Complex, Muscat, Oman	Laos	6–0	7–0	2002 FIFA World Cup qualification
24	7 May 2001	Sultan Qaboos Sports Complex, Muscat, Oman	Philippines	1–0	7–0	2002 FIFA World Cup qualification
25	7 May 2001	Sultan Qaboos Sports Complex, Muscat, Oman	Philippines	6–0	7–0	2002 FIFA World Cup qualification
26	18 May 2001	Al-Hamadaniah Stadium, Aleppo, Syria	Syria	2–1	3–3	2002 FIFA World Cup qualification
27	29 July 2001	Sultan Qaboos Sports Complex, Muscat, Oman	Iraq	1–0	1–0	Friendly
28	19 October 2001	Zayed Sports City Stadium, Abu Dhabi, United Arab Emirates	United Arab Emirates	2–0	2–2	2002 FIFA World Cup qualification
29	25 December 2001	Sultan Qaboos Sports Complex, Muscat, Oman	Syria	1–0	1–0	Friendly
30	30 December 2001	Sultan Qaboos Sports Complex, Muscat, Oman	Macedonia	2–0	2–0	Friendly
31	19 January 2002	King Fahd Stadium, Riyadh, Saudi Arabia	Kuwait	1–0	3–1	15th Arabian Gulf Cup
32	19 January 2002	King Fahd Stadium, Riyadh, Saudi Arabia	Kuwait	2–0	3–1	15th Arabian Gulf Cup
33	19 January 2002	King Fahd Stadium, Riyadh, Saudi Arabia	Kuwait	3–1	3–1	15th Arabian Gulf Cup
34	23 January 2002	King Fahd Stadium, Riyadh, Saudi Arabia	Qatar	1–0	1–2	15th Arabian Gulf Cup
35	28 January 2002	King Fahd Stadium, Riyadh, Saudi Arabia	Bahrain	1–0	1–1	15th Arabian Gulf Cup
36	25 September 2003	Munhak Stadium, Incheon, South Korea	Nepal	7–0	7–0	2004 AFC Asian Cup qualification
37	29 September 2003	Munhak Stadium, Incheon, South Korea	Vietnam	4–0	6–0	2004 AFC Asian Cup qualification
38	29 September 2003	Munhak Stadium, Incheon, South Korea	Vietnam	5–0	6–0	2004 AFC Asian Cup qualification
39	10 October 2003	Sultan Qaboos Sports Complex, Muscat, Oman	Jordan		2–1	Friendly
40	21 October 2003	Sultan Qaboos Sports Complex, Muscat, Oman	South Korea	1–1	3–1	2004 AFC Asian Cup qualification
41	24 October 2003	Sultan Qaboos Sports Complex, Muscat, Oman	Vietnam	1–0	2–0	2004 AFC Asian Cup qualification
42	20 December 2003	Sultan Qaboos Sports Complex, Muscat, Oman	Estonia	3–1	3–1	Friendly
43	24 April 2008	Muscat, Oman	Liberia	1–0	1–0	Friendly

== Honours ==
Dhofar

- Omani League: 1998–99, 2000–01, 2004–05; Runner-up 2007–08, 2009–10
- Sultan Qaboos Cup: 1999, 1999, 2006; Runner-up 2002, 2009
- Oman Super Cup: 1999, 2000 Runner-up 2012
- Oman Professional League Cup: 2012–13; runner-up: 2014–15
- Gulf Club Champions Cup runner-up: 1996
- Baniyas SC International Tournament: 2014

Al Sadd

- Qatar Crown Prince Cup: 2003
- Emir of Qatar Cup: 2003

Individual

- Oman All time top goal scorer
- IFFHS World's Top Goal Scorer: 2001
- Top goal scorer of the 16th Arabian Gulf Cup

== See also ==
- List of men's footballers with 100 or more international caps
