= List of football clubs in Oman =

The Sultanate of Oman has had a relatively long history of football clubs dating back to the 1940s. The oldest club still surviving to date in the Sultanate is Oman Club which was established in 1942. Many clubs have also experienced mergers such as Muscat, and Seeb. There are currently 43 clubs known to Oman.

Dhofar is known as the most successful club in Omani football, earning them the nickname "Al-Zaeem" (lit. 'The Leaders'), for grabbing 12 Omani League titles; the most won by a club, and winning 11 Sultan Qaboos Cups The most recent cup was at 2024, as well as reaching the final of the Gulf Club Champions Cup once in 1996 losing to Saudi club Al-Nassr. Fanja has also had a successful title history with 9 Omani League titles to their name, 9 Sultan Qaboos Cups to their name and also winning in 1989 the Gulf Club Championship making them the only Omani club to win internationally, despite having a successful history, Fanja has been in a downfall since the 1990s, but regained their form in the 2010s winning a number of titles most notably their ninth Sultan Qaboos Cup only to once again lose form in the 2020s after the covid pandemic.

== Evolution to a Professional League ==
Although being very popular in the local community, it is ranked according to the AFC as a Class D football League. Sayyid Khalid bin Hamid, OFA President, has announced his organization's plan to transform the Omani Football League into a professional league by the year 2012, and will change its name to the "Oman Mobile League." Many companies such as Nissan, Shell, and Oman Mobile, are one of the main reasons why the league is expected to transform, along with the leadership of Sayyid Khalid.

== 2024–25 Oman Professional League teams ==
Locations of teams in the 2024–25 Oman Professional League

Club	Home city	Stadium	Capacity
Al-Khaburah	Al-Khaburah	Sohar Regional Sports Complex	19,000
Al-Nahda Club	Al-Buraimi	Al-Buraimi Sports Stadium	17,000
Al-Nasr SC	Salalah	Al-Saada Stadium	8,000
Al-Rustaq	Rustaq	Rustaq Sports Complex	17,000
Al-Seeb	Seeb	Al-Seeb Stadium	14,000
Al-Shabab	Barka	Al-Seeb Stadium	14,000
Bahla	Bahla	Nizwa Sport Complex	10,000
Ibri	Ibri		
Oman	Muscat	Sultan Qaboos Sports Complex	34,000
Saham	Saham	Sohar Regional Sports Complex	19,000
Sohar	Sohar	Sohar Club Stadium	3,350
Sur	Sur	Sur Sports Complex	8,000
