= Oman First Division League =

- Founded: 1975
- Country: Oman
- Confederation: AFC
- Number of clubs: 12
- Level on pyramid: 2
- Promotion to: Oman Professional League
- Relegation to: Oman Second Division League
- Domestic cup: Sultan Qaboos Cup

The Oman First Division League (known as the Omantel First Division League for sponsorship purposes) is the second-highest football league in Oman. It is contested by 12 teams, the top 2 of which replace the bottom two in the Oman Professional League, while the third-placed faces the third-last-placed team of the Oman Professional League in a play-off to gain promotion.

== Clubs (2023–24) ==
Group 1

- Al-Ittihad Club (Salalah)
- Saham SC
- Ahli Sidab Club
- Nizwa Club
- Fanja SC
- Al-Mudhaibi Club

Group 2

- Al-Salam SC (Oman)
- Al-Khaburah Club
- Muscat Club
- Salalah SC
- Quriyat Club
- Al-Taliya Club

Promoted In 2022–23

- Ibri Club
- Al-Wahda SC (Oman)
- Al-Shabab Club (Oman)

== Winners ==
Season	Champions
2009–10	Ahli Sidab
2010–11	Sur SC
2011–12	Saham Club
2012–13	Al Ittihad
2013–14	Al-Khaboura SC
2014–15	Muscat Club
2015–16	Al-Rustaq

== Golden Boot ==
- 2014–15 (Nigeria) Philip Oluwaseun Aremu
