= Al-Mussanah Club =

Omani sports club

Al Musannah Club نادي المصنعة الرياضي
- Full name: Al Musannah Club
- Nicknames: Al-Siham Al-Hamra'a (Red Arrow(s))
- Founded: 1970; 56 years ago
- Ground: Al-Seeb Stadium; Al-Seeb, Al-Batinah, Oman
- Capacity: 14,000
- Chairman: (Oman) Sheikh Rashid Al-Saadi
- Manager: (Oman) ?
- League: Oman Professional League
- 2022–23: 9th

Al Musannah Club (Arabic: نادي المصنعة الرياضي; also known locally as Al-Siham Al-Hamra'a, or "Red Arrow(s)", or just plainly as Al-Mussanah) is an Omani sports club based in Al-Musannah, Oman. The club currently plays in the Oman Professional League, top division of Oman Football Association. Their home ground is Al-Seeb Stadium. The stadium is government owned, but they also own their own personal stadium and sports equipment, as well as their own training facilities.

== Being a multisport club ==
Although being mainly known for their football, Al-Mussanah Club like many other clubs in Oman, have not only football in their list, but also hockey, volleyball, handball, basketball, badminton and squash. They also have a youth football team competing in the Omani Youth league.

== Colors, kit providers and sponsors ==
Al-Mussanah Club have been known since establishment to wear a full red or black (Away) kit (usually a darker shade of red). They have also had many different sponsors over the years. As of now, Adidas provides them with kits.

== Honours and achievements ==
Domestic league

- Oman First Division League
  - Runners-up 2010–11

== Players ==
Al-Mussanah Club - 2014–15 Oman Professional League

=== First-team squad ===
Note: Flags indicate national team as defined under FIFA eligibility rules; some limited exceptions apply. Players may hold more than one non-FIFA nationality.

No.	Pos.	Nation	Player
66	GK	OMA	Hani Al-Rushaidi
77	GK	OMA	Naif Al-Balushi
6	DF	OMA	Ahmed Al-Mujaini
13	DF	OMA	Mahboob Al-Hidabi
15	DF	OMA	Khalid Al-Yahyani
5	MF	OMA	Issa Al-Raisi

No.	Pos.	Nation	Player
23	MF	OMA	Wail Al-Farsi
27	MF	OMA	Saif Al-Mamari
88	MF	OMA	Khalid Al-Hajri
99	MF	OMA	Hisham Al-Rushaidi
29	FW	OMA	Yousuf Al-Saadi

== Personnel ==
=== Technical staff ===
Position	Name
Head coach	(Oman) Musabah Al-Saadi
Assistant coach	
Goalkeeping coach	(North Korea) Kim Yong-kwang
Fitness coach	
Team Manager	(Oman) Abdullah Al-Saadi
Team Supervisor	

== See also ==
- List of football clubs in Oman
