= Al-Mudhaibi Club =

Omani sports club

Al-Mudhaibi Club نادي المضيبي
- Nicknames: Al-Annabi (The Maroon(s))
- Founded: 1986; 40 years ago
- Ground: Sultan Qaboos Sports Complex; Bowsher, Oman
- Capacity: 34,000
- Chairman: (Oman) Sheikh Khalid Mohammed Harib Al-Habsi
- Manager: (Oman) Anwar Al-Habsi
- League: Oman First Division League
- 2017–18: 13th ▼
Home colours	Away colours	Third colours

Al-Mudhaibi Club (Arabic: نادي المضيبي; also known locally as Al-Annabi, or "The Maroon(s)", or simply as Al-Mudhaibi) is an Omani sports club based in Al-Mudhaibi, Oman. The club currently plays in Oman First Division League, first division of Oman Football Association. Their home ground is Sultan Qaboos Sports Complex. The stadium is government owned, but they also own their own personal stadium and sports equipment, as well as their own training facilities.

== History ==
Al-Mudhaibi Club was founded on 3 October 1986 and registered on 26 June 2002. The club got promoted to Oman Second Division League in 2004 after they secured the second position in the 2003-04 Oman Second Division League.

Al-Mudhaibi is famous for producing some of the greatest and most successful Omani footballers including Ali Al-Habsi and Harib Al-Habsi and retired Omani internationals, Sultan Al-Touqi and Saif Al-Habsi. Ali Al-Habsi plays for Reading in the Football League Championship and is also the captain of Oman national football team. His brother, Harib Al-Habsi who too like Ali started his professional footballing career with Al-Mudhaibi Club has made one appearance for Oman national football team in a friendly match against Yemen Omani retired international Sultan Al-Touqi, former player of Al-Mudhaibi has had successful stints with various top clubs in the Middle East including Al-Qadisa SC, Al-Salmiya SC and Al-Shabab SC of Kuwait, Al-Shamal Sports Club of Qatar and Al-Shabab Club and Al-Suwaiq Club of Oman. Saif Al-Habsi, formerly known as the Maradona of the Gulf is a former Oman national football team player who has made appearances in the 11th Arabian Gulf Cup, the 12th Arabian Gulf Cup and the 13th Arabian Gulf Cup which was held in Oman.

== Being a multisport club ==
Although being mainly known for their football, Al-Mudhaibi Club like many other clubs in Oman, have not only football in their list, but also hockey, volleyball, handball, basketball, badminton and squash. They also have various youth football teams competing in Oman Olympic League, Oman Youth League (U-19) and Oman Youth League (U-17).

== Crest and colours ==
Al-Mudhaibi Club have been known since establishment to wear a full maroon (with white stripes on the trim) or white (Away) (with maroon strips on the trim) kit. They have also had many different sponsorships over the years. As of now, Erreà provides them with kits.

== Honours and achievements ==
=== National titles ===
- Oman Second Division League (0):

- Runners-up 2003-04

== Personnel ==
=== Technical staff ===
Position	Name
Head Coach	(Oman) Anwar Al-Habsi
Assistant Coach	(Oman) Yahya Al-Shezani
Team Manager	(Oman) Jamal Al-Habsi
Sports Scientist	(Oman) Dani al-Din Al-Yemison

=== Management ===
Position	Staff
Chairman	Sheikh Khalid Mohammed Harib Al-Habsi
Vice-president	Ahmed Nasser Mohammed Al-Rashdi
General Secretary	Harib Mohammed Harib Al-Habsi
Treasurer	Badar Nasser Mohammed Al-Habsi
Board Member	Salim Al-Sawafi
