= Royal Oman Police Stadium =

Stadium in Muscat, Oman

Royal Oman Police Stadium ملعب الشرطة السلطانية العُمانية
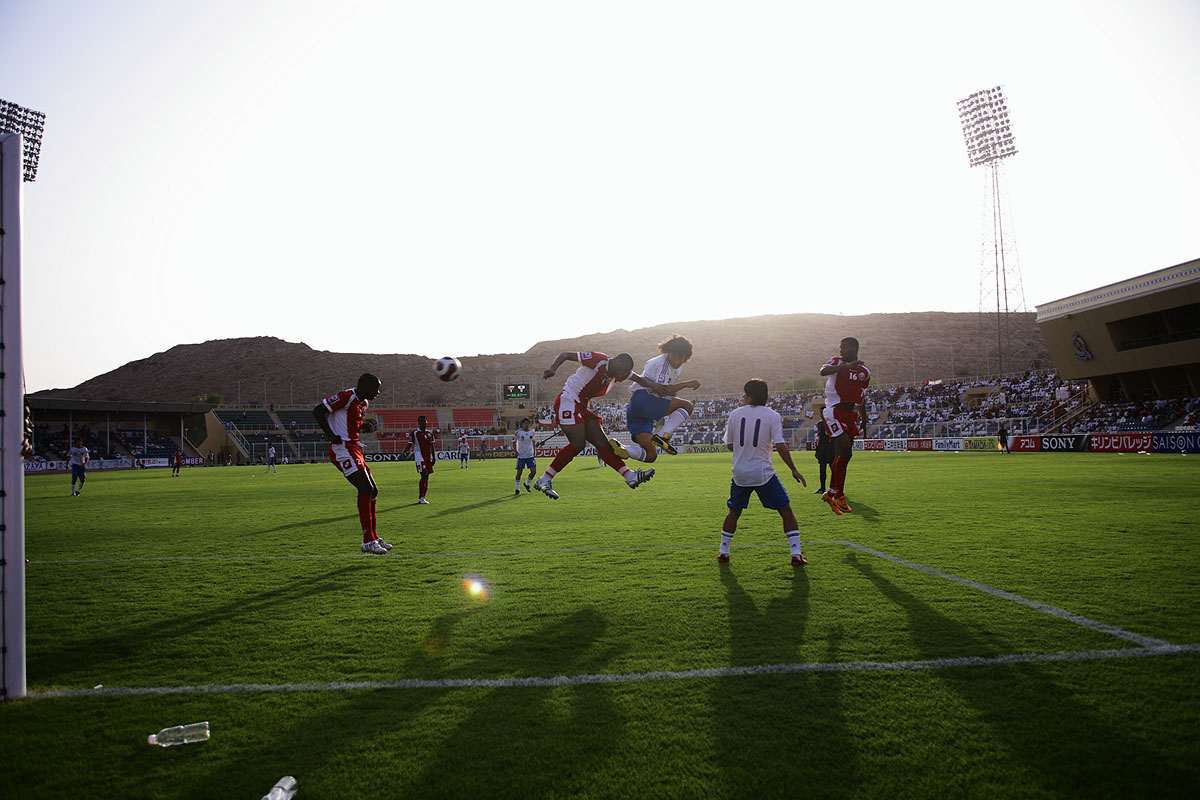
- Oman – Japan at Royal Oman Police Stadium
- Interactive map of Royal Oman Police Stadium ملعب الشرطة السلطانية العُمانية
- Location: Alwatiya/Mutrah, Muscat, Oman
- Coordinates: 23.6086°N 58.5067°E
- Owner: Government of Oman
- Capacity: 12,000
- Surface: Grass

Construction
- Opened: 1987

Tenant
- Oman Club

The Royal Oman Police Stadium (Arabic: ملعب الشرطة السلطانية العُمانية) is a multi-purpose stadium in Muscat, Oman. The stadium opened in 1987. It is currently used mainly for hosting football matches and is the home stadium of Oman Club. The stadium's original capacity of 15,000 spectators was reduced to 12,000 after renovation. The stadium is maintained by the Royal Oman Police and plays host to various national cultural events and parades. The stadium is one of few venues that have hosted cricket matches in the country.

== See also ==
- List of football stadiums in Oman
