= Majees SC =

Omani sports club

Majees SC نادي مجيس الرياضي
- Full name: Majees Sports Club
- Founded: 1979; 47 years ago
- Ground: Sohar Regional Sports Complex; Sohar, Oman
- Capacity: 19,000
- Chairman: (Oman) Nasser Al-Balushi
- League: Oman Professional League
- 2013–14: 13th (Relegated)
Home colours	Away colours

Majees Sports Club (Arabic: نادي مجيس الرياضي) is an Omani sports club based in Majees. The club currently plays in the First Division League of Oman Football Association. Their home ground is Sohar Regional Sports Complex. The stadium is government owned, but they also own their own personal stadium and sports equipments, as well as their own training facilities.

== History ==
The club won the First Division league of Oman Football Association in 2004. Majees SC then played in the 2005–06 season and in the 2006–07 season in the Omani League. In the 2006–07 season, they got relegated to the Second Division. The club got promoted to the Oman Professional League again after they became the runners-up of the 2012–13 First Division League.

== Being a multisport club ==
Although being mainly known for their football, Majees SC like many other clubs in Oman, have not only football in their list, but also hockey, volleyball, handball, basketball, badminton and squash. They also have a youth football team competing in the Omani Youth league.

== Colors, kit providers and sponsors ==
Majees SC have been known since establishment to wear a full blue or white (Away) kit (usually a lighter shade of blue). They have also had many different sponsors over the years. As of now, Adidas provides them with kits.

== Honours and achievements ==
=== National titles ===
- Oman First Division League (0):

- Runners-up 2012–13
