= Nizwa Club =

Omani sports club

Nizwa Club نادي نزوى
- Full name: Nizwa Club
- Ground: Nizwa Sports Complex; Nizwa, Oman
- Capacity: 10,000
- League: Omani League
- 2002–03: 11th (Relegated)
Home colours	Away colours	Third colours

Nizwa Club (Arabic: نادي نزوى) is an Omani sports club based in Nizwa, Oman. The club currently plays in Oman First Division League, first division of Oman Football Association. Their home ground is Nizwa Sports Complex. The stadium is government owned, but they also own their own personal stadium and sports equipments, as well as their own training facilities.

== Being a multisport club ==
Although being mainly known for their football, Nizwa Club like many other clubs in Oman, have not only football in their list, but also hockey, volleyball, handball, basketball, badminton and squash. They also have a youth football team competing in the Omani Youth league.

== Colors, kit providers and sponsors ==
Nizwa Club have been known since establishment to wear a full white (with blue stripes) or blue (Away) kit (usually a darker shade of blue). They have also had many different sponsors over the years. As of now, Uhlsport provides them with kits.
