= Omantel =

Telecommunications company in Oman

Oman Telecommunications Company SAOG
- Type: Public
- Industry: Telecommunications
- Founded: 1996; 30 years ago
- Headquarters: Muscat, Oman
- Key people: Mulham Basheer Al Jarf (Chairman of the Board); Aladdin Abdullah Baitfadhil (CEO)
- Number of employees: 2,690
- Website: omantel.om

Oman Telecommunications Company (Omantel) is the first telecommunications company in Oman and is the primary provider of internet services in the country. The government of Oman owns a 51% share in Omantel.

Omantel acquired 65% of WorldCall Pakistan in 2008. In the biggest transaction of its kind in Middle East & North African Region (MENA), One of the directors was later charged for corruption in this acquisition, which resulted in a loss of almost 200 million US dollars for the company. Omantel acquired 12.1% of Zain Group stake worth of $2.19 billion in 2017, making it the second largest shareholder with 21.9% stake.

Omantel has established itself as a major international hub, with currently ten submarine cables landing in Oman, e.g. TWA, EIG, PLAG, Falcon, EPEG, SMW-3, Mena, POI, OMRAN, GBI and BBG.

In 2015 it announced a project that will implement FTTH technology in the country. The same year, it won an award for its human resources standard of quality.

Omantel is the first telecommunication operator in Oman to launch a 5G network.
