= Salalah SC =

Omani sports club

Salalah SC نادي صلالة الرياضة
- Full name: Salalah Sport Club
- Nickname: "Al-Numoor" (The Tigers)
- Founded: 1981; 45 years ago
- Ground: Al-Saada Stadium; Salalah Sports Complex; Salalah, Oman
- Capacity: 12,000; 8,000
- Chairman: (Oman) Ali Al-Raud Awadh Fadhil
- League: Oman First Division League
- 2014–15: 2nd (runners-up)
Home colours	Away colours

Salalah Sport Club (Arabic: نادي صلالة الرياضي), also known locally as Al-Numoor (Arabic: النمور, literally: "The Tigers"), or just simply as Salalah, is an Omani football club based in Oman's southern city of Salalah. Their home ground is Al-Saada Stadium, but they also recognize the older Salalah Sports Complex as their home ground. Both stadiums are government-owned, but they also own their own personal stadium and sports equipment, as well as their own training facilities.

== History ==
Shortly after the club was promoted to the Omani League, top division of Oman Football Association, the club officials decided to rename the club as "Salalah" in order to give it a more distinct name, rather than being named Al-Hilal, a name which is used by many clubs throughout the Middle East and in 2010 the name was officially changed to Salalah SC. The club's crest was revealed days before the start of the 2010–11 season.

== Being a multisport club ==
Although being mainly known for their football, Salalah SC like many other clubs in Oman, have not only football in their list, but also hockey, volleyball, handball, basketball, badminton and squash. They also have a youth football team competing in the Omani Youth league.

== Colors, kit providers and sponsors ==
Salalah SC have been known since establishment to wear a full blue kit (usually a lighter shade of blue), varying themselves from neighbors Al-Ittihad (Green), Al-Nasr S.C.S.C. (Blue) and Dhofar S.C.S.C. (Red) kits. They have also had many different sponsors over the years. As of now, Uhlsport provides them with kits.

== Honours and achievements ==
=== Domestic titles ===
- Oman First Division League
  - Runners-up (2): 2009–10, 2014–15
