= Sohar SC =

Omani sports club

- Full name: Sohar Sporting Club
- Nicknames: Al-Tamaseeh (The Crocodile (s))
- Founded: 1972; 54 years ago
- Ground: Sohar Club Stadium; Sohar, Oman
- Capacity: 3,350
- Chairman: Ibrahim Al Moqbali
- Manager: Bruno Šiklić
- League: Oman Professional League
- 2025–26: OPL, 7th
Home colours	Away colours

Sohar Sporting Club (Arabic: نادي صحار الرياضي) is an Omani sports club based in Sohar, Oman. The club currently plays in the Oman Professional League, top division of the Oman Football Association.

== History ==
The club got promoted to the Omani League, top division of Oman Football Association, after winning the promotion/relegation play-off in the 2012-13 First Division League against Al Tali'aa.

== Multisport club ==
Sohar SC also has hockey, volleyball, handball, basketball, badminton and squash sections.

=== First-team squad ===
Note: Flags indicate national team as defined under FIFA eligibility rules; some limited exceptions apply. Players may hold more than one non-FIFA nationality.

No.	Pos.	Nation	Player
2	DF	OMA	Khalid Al-Mujaini
3	DF	MAR	Sami El Anabi
4	DF	ALG	Mohamed Benbelabbas
5	DF	OMA	Abdullah Saif Al-Mamari
6	DF	OMA	Ishaq Al-Muqbali
9	FW	GAM	Gaira Joof
10	MF	OMA	Zakaria Al-Qurtubi
11	FW	OMA	Saud Al-Muqbali
12	DF	OMA	Hatim Al-Ghaithi
13	MF	OMA	Idris Al-Muqbali
16	DF	OMA	Muayid Ma'asi
17	MF	OMA	Hashar Al-Darmaki
18	GK	OMA	Mansour Al-Amri
19	FW	OMA	Luqman Al-Jaddidi
20	MF	OMA	Ahmed Al-Hilali
21	MF	OMA	Mohammed Al-Hamdani
22	GK	OMA	Yousef Al-Sheyadi
23	MF	OMA	Abdullah Mubarak Al-Muqbali

No.	Pos.	Nation	Player
24	DF	OMA	Mustafa Al-Ruqaishi
25	DF	OMA	Abdul Majeed Al-Yahmadi
26	MF	OMA	Salem Al-Makhmari
27	MF	OMA	Sultan Al-Sahli
30	MF	OMA	Rashid Al-Hosani
33	DF	OMA	Hijab Al-Marzouei
34	MF	OMA	Ahmed Al-Amrani
41	MF	OMA	Abdul Rahim Al-Muqbali
45	MF	OMA	Ali Al-Shirawi
55	GK	OMA	Ali Al-Rawahi
60	MF	OMA	Wathaq Al-Farsi
66	GK	OMA	Mazen Al-Muqbali
69	MF	OMA	Osama Al-Farsi
77	MF	OMA	Badar Al-Jabri
87	FW	OMA	Muhanad Al-Saadi
96	FW	OMA	Al-Mustafa Al-Mamari

== Personnel ==
=== Technical staff ===
Position	Name
Head coach	(Croatia) Bruno Šiklić
Assistant coach	(Oman) Abdullah Al-Moqbali
Team manager	(Oman) Moustafa Al-Moqbali
Goalkeeping coach	(Tunisia) Safouane Hidri
Team doctor	(Egypt) Mamun Mohammed

=== Management ===
Position	Staff
Chairman	Ibrahim Al Maqbali
Vice-president	Abdulaziz Al Ajmi
General secretary	Manea Al Jabri
Treasurer	Ayman Al Maqbali
Board member	Said Al Shibli
Board member	Mohamed Al Shibli
Board member	Yusuf Al Maqbali
Board member	Salim Al Shibli
Board member	Khalid Al Hamdi

== See also ==
- List of football clubs in Oman
