= Al-Khaburah Club =

Omani football club

Al-Khaburah Club نادي الخابورة
- Full name: Al-Khaburah Sports Club نادي الخابورة الرياضي
- Nickname: Al-Fahood (The Cheetah)
- Founded: 1972; 54 years ago (as Al-Khaburah)
- Ground: Sohar Regional Sports Complex; Sohar, Oman
- Capacity: 19,000
- Chairman: Sheikh Fahad Sultan Saif Al-Hosni
- Manager: Sherif El-Khashab
- League: Oman Professional League
- 2025–26: 13th of 12
Home colours	Away colours

Al-Khaburah Sports Club (Arabic: نادي الخابورة الرياضي) is an Omani professional football club based in Al-Khaburah, Al Batinah Region, Oman. The club currently plays in the Oman Professional League, top division of Oman Football Association. Their home ground is Sohar Regional Sports Complex. The stadium is government owned, but the club also has its own stadium and sports equipment, as well as its own training facilities.

== Multisport club ==
Although being mainly known for their football section, Al-Khaboura SC has hockey, volleyball, handball, basketball, badminton and squash. They also have various youth football teams competing in Oman Olympic League, Oman Youth League (U-19) and Oman Youth League (U-17).

== Crest and colours ==
Al-Khaboura SC have been known since establishment to wear a full yellow (with green stripes on the trim) kit.

== Honours and achievements ==
=== Domestic ===
- Oman First Division League
  - Winners (1): 2013–14
- Oman Youth League (U-19)
  - Winners (1): 2000–01
- Sultan Qaboos Cup U-19
  - Winners (1): 2002

=== International ===
- Gulf Club Champions Cup U-17
  - Winners (2): 2003, 2004
  - Runners-up (1): 2000

== Personnel ==
=== Technical staff ===
Position	Name
Manager	(Egypt) Sherif El-Khashab
Assistant manager	(Oman) Ali Mubarak Al-Buraiki
Goalkeeping coach	
Team manager	(Oman) Mustafa Al-Hosni
Fitness coach	(Oman) Ali Mubarak Al-Buraiki

=== Management ===
Position	Staff
Chairman	Sheikh Fahad Sultan Saif Al-Hosni
Vice-president	Sheikh Badr Al-Hosni
General secretary	Saleh Al-Zadjali
Treasurer	Ahmed Al-Hosni
Board member	Asad Al-Hosni
Board member	Hafidh Salim Al-Rowas
Board member	Said Ghalib Al-Rowas

== Presidential history ==
Name	From	To
(Oman) Sheikh Taib Khalifa Ali Al-Qutaiti	13 December 1987	5 August 1995
(Oman) Sheikh Saif Hilal Sultan Al-Moosa	28 August 1997	27 August 1999
(Oman) Sheikh Shabib Hilal Al-hosni	8 October 2003	8 October 2006
(Oman) Sheikh Fahad Sultan Saif Al-Hosni	19 December 2006	23 August 2007

== See also ==
- List of football clubs in Oman
