= 2004–05 Omani League =

Omani League
- Season: 2004–05
- Champions: Dhofar
- Relegated: Al-Ahli; Al-Ittihad; Al-Khaboura
- AFC Cup: Dhofar; Al-Nasr
- Matches: 156
- Goals: 457 (2.93 per match)
- Top goalscorer: (Oman) Ahmed Al Busafy (12 goals)
- Biggest home win: Al-Seeb 6-1 Al-Khaboura (23 September 2004)
- Biggest away win: Al-Khaboura 2-6 Al-Nasr (24 March 2005)
- Highest scoring: Sur 6-3 Al-Ittihad (31 March 2005)

The 2004–05 Omani League was the 29th edition of the top football league in Oman. It began on 23 September 2004 and finished on 19 May 2005. Al-Nasr S.C.S.C. were the defending champions, having won the 2003–04 Omani League season. Dhofar S.C.S.C. played out a 1–1 draw away in their final league match against Al-Nasr S.C.S.C. and emerged as the champions of the 2004–05 Omani League with a total of 46 points.

== Teams ==
In this season, the league had increased from 12 to 13 teams. Al-Suwaiq Club and Saham SC were relegated to the Second Division League after finishing in the relegation zone in the 2003–04 season. The two relegated teams were replaced by Second Division League teams Al-Ahli Club, Al-Ittihad Club and Bahla Club.

=== Stadia and locations ===
Club	Home city	Stadium	Capacity
Al-Ittihad	Salalah	Al-Saada Stadium / Salalah Sports Complex	12,000 / 8,000
Al-Khaboura	Al-Khaboura	Sohar Regional Sports Complex	19,000
Al-Nahda	Al-Buraimi	Nizwa Sports Complex	10,000
Al-Nasr	Salalah	Al-Saada Stadium / Salalah Sports Complex	12,000 / 8,000
Al-Oruba	Sur	Sur Sports Complex	8,000
Al-Seeb	Seeb	Seeb Stadium	14,000
Al-Ahli	Sidab	Sultan Qaboos Sports Complex	39,000
Bahla	Bahla	Seeb Stadium	14,000
Al-Tali'aa	Sur	Sur Sports Complex	8,000
Dhofar	Salalah	Al-Saada Stadium / Salalah Sports Complex	12,000 / 8,000
Muscat	Muscat	Sultan Qaboos Sports Complex / Royal Oman Police Stadium	39,000 / 18,000
Oman	Muscat	Sultan Qaboos Sports Complex / Royal Oman Police Stadium	39,000 / 18,000
Sur	Sur	Sur Sports Complex	8,000

== League table ==
As of 19 May 2005

Pos	Team	Pld	W	D	L	GF	GA	GD	Pts	Qualification or relegation
1	Dhofar (C)	24	11	13	0	37	19	+18	46	2006 AFC Cup group stage
2	Al-Oruba	24	12	8	4	42	27	+15	44	
3	Muscat	24	10	10	4	36	24	+12	40	
4	Al-Nahda	24	11	3	10	42	37	+5	36	
5	Sur	24	9	8	7	42	35	+7	35	
6	Oman	24	8	11	5	24	20	+4	35	
7	Al-Nasr	24	9	7	8	38	38	0	34	2006 AFC Cup group stage (Note: Al-Nasr were the second representative from Oman as the winners of 2005 Sultan Qaboos Cup)
8	Al-Seeb	24	8	7	9	43	38	+5	31	
9	Bahla	24	7	10	7	38	41	−3	31	
10	Al-Tali'aa	24	7	6	11	33	37	−4	27	
11	Al-Ahli (R)	24	5	9	10	27	37	−10	24	Relegation Playoff
12	Al-Ittihad (R)	24	6	3	15	29	48	−19	21	Relegation to 2005–06 Oman First Division League
13	Al-Khaboura (R)	24	4	3	17	26	56	−30	15	Relegation to 2005–06 Oman First Division League

Updated to match(es) played on 19 May 2005. Source: League Table
Rules for classification: 1) points; 2) goal difference; 3) number of goals scored.
(C) Champions; (R) Relegated

== Results ==
As of 19 May 2005

Home \ Away	ALI	ALK	ALNH	ALN	ALO	ALS	ALH	BAH	ALT	DHO	MCT	OMA	SUR
Al-Ittihad		3–2	2–1	2–1	1–2	1–4	1–1	2–1	3–3	1–3	0–2	0–1	0–1
Al-Khaboura	0–3		2–3	2–6	0–2	1–2	1–2	2–1	2–1	0–0	0–2	3–0	1–4
Al-Nahda	1–0	2–0		2–0	1–2	2–4	2–1	6–2	3–0	0–1	1–1	2–1	2–3
Al-Nasr	1–0	2–1	2–1		1–1	1–2	2–1	5–3	0–1	1–1	1–1	2–2	2–1
Al-Oruba	3–1	3–0	1–2	2–0		2–1	3–0	1–1	2–3	2–3	1–3	1–1	2–0
Al-Seeb	3–2	6–1	4–1	2–2	3–4		0–2	1–2	1–0	0–2	3–3	0–1	2–2
Al-Ahli	0–2	0–0	1–2	1–0	2–2	1–2		1–1	1–1	2–2	1–1	0–0	4–1
Bahla	2–0	4–2	4–2	1–2	1–1	1–1	1–1		3–2	1–1	1–0	2–3	1–1
Al-Tali'aa	2–2	1–2	0–2	2–0	1–2	3–0	2–0	3–0		1–1	0–2	3–2	1–2
Dhofar	2–0	3–1	3–2	0–0	0–0	0–0	3–1	0–0	1–1		2–0	1–1	1–1
Muscat	2–0	2–2	2–1	4–2	1–1	0–0	2–3	2–3	2–0	1–1		0–0	2–1
Oman	4–0	1–0	0–0	1–1	0–0	3–2	1–0	0–0	1–1	0–1	2–2		1–0
Sur	6–3	3–1	1–1	4–1	1–2	0–0	2–0	2–2	3–1	3–5	0–0	0–0	

Updated to match(es) played on unknown. Source: Results
Legend: Blue = home team win; Yellow = draw; Red = away team win.

== Season statistics ==
As of 19 May 2005

=== Top scorers ===
Rank	Scorer	Club	Goals
1	(Oman) Ahmed Al Busafy	Al-Seeb	12

== Media coverage ==
Oman Mobile League Media Coverage
Country	Television Channel	Matches
Oman	Oman TV2	3 Matches per round

== See also ==
- 2004 Sultan Qaboos Cup
