= 1995–96 Omani League =

Omani League
- Season: 1995–96
- Champions: Sur
- Relegated: Al-Ahli; Buraimi; Al-Khaboura; Mirbat
- Matches: 182
- Goals: 482 (2.65 per match)
- Top goalscorer: (Oman) Hilal Hamid (20 goals)

The 1995–96 Omani League was the 22nd edition of the top football league in Oman. Sur SC were the defending champions, having won the 1994–95 Omani League season. Sur SC successfully defended their title, claiming the 1995–96 Omani League with a total of 56 points.

== Teams ==
This season the league had 14 teams.

=== Stadia and locations ===
Club	Home city	Stadium	Capacity
Al-Khaboura	Al-Khaboura	Sohar Regional Sports Complex	19,000
Al-Bustan	Muscat	Sultan Qaboos Sports Complex / Royal Oman Police Stadium	39,000 / 18,000
Al-Ittihad	Salalah	Al-Saada Stadium / Salalah Sports Complex	12,000 / 8,000
Al-Nasr	Salalah	Al-Saada Stadium / Salalah Sports Complex	12,000 / 8,000
Al-Oruba	Sur	Sur Sports Complex	8,000
Al-Seeb	Seeb	Seeb Stadium	14,000
Al-Ahli	Sidab	Sultan Qaboos Sports Complex	39,000
Buraimi	Al-Buraimi	Nizwa Sports Complex	10,000
Al-Suwaiq	Al-Suwaiq	Seeb Stadium	14,000
Dhofar	Salalah	Al-Saada Stadium / Salalah Sports Complex	12,000 / 8,000
Mirbat	Mirbat	Al-Saada Stadium / Salalah Sports Complex	12,000 / 8,000
Ruwi	Muscat	Sultan Qaboos Sports Complex / Royal Oman Police Stadium	39,000 / 18,000
Oman	Muscat	Sultan Qaboos Sports Complex / Royal Oman Police Stadium	39,000 / 18,000
Sur	Sur	Sur Sports Complex	8,000

== League table ==
Pos	Team	Pld	W	D	L	GF	GA	GD	Pts	Relegation
1	Sur (C)	26	17	5	4	40	16	+24	56	
2	Oman	26	15	5	6	40	25	+15	50	
3	Dhofar	26	14	6	6	58	30	+28	48	
4	Al-Bustan	26	14	4	8	41	23	+18	46	
5	Al-Oruba	26	11	10	5	44	28	+16	43	
6	Ruwi	26	10	7	9	26	27	−1	37	
7	Al-Seeb	26	8	9	9	38	37	+1	33	
8	Al-Ittihad	26	8	9	9	30	30	0	33	
9	Al-Nasr	26	8	8	10	33	36	−3	32	
10	Al-Suwaiq	26	9	5	12	37	52	−15	32	
11	Al-Ahli (R)	26	8	6	12	20	32	−12	30	Relegation to 1996–97 Oman First Division League
12	Buraimi (R)	26	7	2	17	29	48	−19	23	Relegation to 1996–97 Oman First Division League
13	Al-Khaboura (R)	26	4	9	13	22	36	−14	21	Relegation to 1996–97 Oman First Division League
14	Mirbat (R)	26	4	4	18	24	60	−36	16	Relegation to 1996–97 Oman First Division League

Source: RSSSF
Rules for classification: 1) points; 2) goal difference; 3) number of goals scored.
(C) Champions; (R) Relegated

== Season statistics ==
=== Top scorers ===
Rank	Scorer	Club	Goals
1	(Oman) Hilal Hamid	Dhofar	20
