= 2006–07 Omani League =

Omani League
- Season: 2006–07
- Champions: Al-Nahda
- Relegated: Mjees; Al-Salam
- AFC Cup: Al-Nahda; Sur
- Arab Champions League: Al-Oruba
- Matches: 132
- Goals: 301 (2.28 per match)
- Top goalscorer: (Oman) Mohammed Abdullah (6 goals)
- Biggest home win: Al-Seeb 6-1 Al-Salam (9 November 2006)
- Biggest away win: Bahla 0-3 Al-Nahda (13 October 2006); Al-Salam 0-3 Al-Nasr (2 February 2007)
- Highest scoring: Al-Seeb 6-1 Al-Salam (9 November 2006); Bahla 4-3 Mjees (30 November 2006)
- Longest winning run: (4 games); Al-Oruba
- Longest unbeaten run: (8 games); Al-Nahda
- Longest losing run: (6 games); Al-Khaboura

The 2006–07 Omani League was the 31st edition of the top football league in Oman. It began on 13 October 2006 and finished on 3 May 2007. Muscat Club were the defending champions, having won the previous 2005–06 Omani League season. Al-Nahda Club won 1-0 away in their final league match against Mjees SC and emerged as the champions of the 2006–07 Omani League with a total of 43 points.

== Teams ==
This season the league had 12 teams. Al-Suwaiq Club and Oman Club were relegated to the Second Division League after finishing in the relegation zone in the 2005–06 season. The two relegated teams were replaced by Second Division League teams Al-Khaboura SC and Al-Salam SC.

=== Stadia and locations ===
Club	Home city	Stadium	Capacity
Al-Khaboura	Al-Khaboura	Sohar Regional Sports Complex	19,000
Al-Nahda	Al-Buraimi	Nizwa Sports Complex	10,000
Al-Nasr	Salalah	Al-Saada Stadium / Salalah Sports Complex	12,000 / 8,000
Al-Oruba	Sur	Sur Sports Complex	8,000
Al-Seeb	Seeb	Seeb Stadium	14,000
Bahla	Bahla	Seeb Stadium	14,000
Al-Tali'aa	Sur	Sur Sports Complex	8,000
Dhofar	Salalah	Al-Saada Stadium / Salalah Sports Complex	12,000 / 8,000
Muscat	Muscat	Sultan Qaboos Sports Complex / Royal Oman Police Stadium	39,000 / 18,000
Al-Salam	Muscat	Sultan Qaboos Sports Complex / Royal Oman Police Stadium	39,000 / 18,000
Mjees	Majees	Sohar Regional Sports Complex	19,000
Sur	Sur	Sur Sports Complex	8,000

== League table ==
Pos	Team	Pld	W	D	L	GF	GA	GD	Pts	Qualification or relegation
1	Al-Nahda (C)	22	12	7	3	35	20	+15	43	2008 AFC Cup group stage
2	Al-Oruba (C)	22	12	5	5	28	18	+10	41	2007–08 Arab Champions League Round of 32
3	Dhofar	22	9	9	4	31	22	+9	36	
4	Al-Nasr	22	9	8	5	28	19	+9	35	
5	Muscat	22	9	5	8	26	18	+8	32	
6	Al Tali'aa	22	8	8	6	19	17	+2	32	
7	Al-Seeb	22	8	6	8	31	29	+2	30	
8	Sur	22	8	5	9	24	25	−1	29	2008 AFC Cup group stage (Note: Sur were the second representative from Oman as the winners of 2007 Sultan Qaboos Cup)
9	Bahla	22	6	4	12	24	32	−8	22	
10	Al-Khaboura	22	5	7	10	15	26	−11	22	Relegation Playoff
11	Mjees (R)	22	5	5	12	16	32	−16	20	Relegation to 2007–08 Oman First Division League
12	Al-Salam (R)	22	5	5	12	24	43	−19	20	Relegation to 2007–08 Oman First Division League

Updated to match(es) played on 3 May 2007. Source:
Rules for classification: 1) points; 2) goal difference; 3) number of goals scored.
(C) Champions; (R) Relegated

== Results ==
Home \ Away	ALK	ALNH	ALN	ALO	ALSE	BAH	ALT	DHO	MCT	ALSA	MJS	SUR
Al-Khaboura		0–2	1–1	1–3	1–1	1–0	0–1	0–0	3–1	1–0	1–0	2–2
Al-Nahda	1–0		4–2	0–1	2–2	1–0	0–0	2–2	1–1	2–2	2–3	0–2
Al-Nasr	3–0	1–1		0–2	4–0	0–0	1–0	3–3	1–1	2–1	0–0	0–2
Al-Oruba	1–0	1–2	1–2		1–0	1–0	0–1	1–3	1–1	3–1	1–0	1–1
Al-Seeb	2–1	1–2	0–0	1–2		2–1	1–0	2–1	2–2	6–1	5–1	1–3
Bahla	3–0	0–3	0–2	2–2	1–0		1–1	0–1	0–1	3–2	4–3	2–0
Al-Tali'aa	0–0	1–2	1–0	0–2	0–1	2–2		1–1	1–0	2–1	3–1	2–0
Dhofar	1–1	1–1	0–1	0–1	1–1	3–2	0–0		2–0	2–1	1–0	2–1
Muscat	0–0	0–1	0–1	2–1	3–0	3–0	2–0	1–0		4–0	2–0	0–1
Al-Salam	3–1	2–1	0–3	1–2	0–2	2–0	1–1	1–1	1–2		2–2	2–1
Mjees	0–0	0–1	1–0	0–0	1–0	0–2	0–1	1–4	1–0	0–0		2–0
Sur	2–1	0–2	1–1	0–0	1–1	2–1	1–1	1–2	1–0	0–2	3–0	

Updated to match(es) played on 3 May 2007. Source:
Legend: Blue = home team win; Yellow = draw; Red = away team win.

== Season statistics ==
As of 3 May 2007

=== Top scorers ===
Rank	Scorer	Club	Goals
1	(Oman) Mohammed Abdullah	Al-Nasr	6
1	(Oman) Hani Al-Dhabit	Dhofar	6
3	(Oman) Osama Subait	Al-Tali'aa	5
4	(Oman) Ahmed Al Busafy	Al-Seeb	4
4	(Oman) Saud Ali	Al-Seeb	4
4	(Oman) Hussain Mustahil	Al-Nasr	4
7	(Oman) Hussain Al-Hadhri	Dhofar	3
7	(Oman) Ibrahim Subait	Al-Oruba	3
7	(Oman) Salem Al-Shamsi	Al-Nahda	3
7	(Oman) Said Mubarak Al-Maamari	Al-Salam	3
7	(Oman) Bilal Zayed	Al-Nasr	3
7	(Oman) Younis Mubarak	Al-Oruba	3

== Media coverage ==
Oman Mobile League Media Coverage
Country	Television Channel	Matches
Oman	Oman TV2	3 Matches per round

== See also ==
- 2006 Sultan Qaboos Cup
