= 2007 Sultan Qaboos Cup =

Tournament details
- Country: Oman
- Teams: 32

Final positions
- Champions: Sur
- Runner-up: Muscat

Tournament statistics
- Matches played: 68
- Goals scored: 202 (2.97 per match)

The 2007 Sultan Qaboos Cup was the 35th edition of the Sultan Qaboos Cup (Arabic: كأس السلطان قابوس), the premier knockout tournament for football teams in Oman.

The competition began on 15 August 2007 with the group stage and concluded on 26 November 2007. Dhofar S.C.S.C. were the defending champions, having won their seventh title in 2006. On Monday 26 November 2007, Sur SC were crowned the champions of the 2007 Sultan Qaboos Cup, winning the title for the third time. They defeated Muscat Club 5–4 on penalties after the match had ended 1-1 after extra time.

== Teams ==
The 2007 edition of the tournament had 32 teams. The winners qualified for the 2008 AFC Cup.

- Ahli Sidab Club (Sidab)
- Al-Ittihad Club (Salalah)
- Al-Kamel Wa Al-Wafi SC
- Al-Khaboora SC (Al-Khaboora)
- Al-Mudhaibi SC (Al-Mudhaibi)
- Al-Musannah SC (Al-Musannah)
- Al-Nahda Club (Al-Buraimi)
- Al-Nasr S.C.S.C. (Salalah)
- Al-Oruba SC (Sur)
- Al-Rustaq SC (Rustaq)
- Al-Salam SC (Sohar)
- Al-Seeb Club (Seeb)
- Al-Shabab Club (Seeb)
- Al-Suwaiq Club (Suwaiq
- Al-Tali'aa SC (Sur)
- Al-Wahda SC (Sur)
- Bahla Club (Bahla)
- Bowsher Club (Bawshar)
- Dhofar S.C.S.C. (Salalah)
- Fanja SC (Fanja)
- Ja'lan SC (Jalan Bani Bu Ali)
- Khasab SC (Khasab)
- Majees SC (Majees)
- Mirbat SC (Mirbat)
- Muscat Club (Muscat)
- Nizwa Club (Nizwa)
- Oman Club (Muscat)
- Saham SC (Saham)
- Salalah SC (Salalah)
- Sohar SC (Sohar)
- Sur SC (Sur)

== Group stage ==
=== Group A ===
Pos.	Team	GP	W	D	L	GS	GA	GD	Pts
1	Al-Khaboora	2	2	0	0	4	1	+3	6
2	Al-Nahda	2	1	1	0	6	0	+6	4
3	Nizwa	3	1	1	1	3	4	-1	4
4	Al-Musannah	3	0	0	3	1	9	-8	0

=== Group B ===
Pos.	Team	GP	W	D	L	GS	GA	GD	Pts
1	Sur	3	2	1	0	10	3	+7	7
2	Saham	3	1	2	0	5	4	+1	5
3	Sohar	3	1	1	1	7	8	-1	4
4	Al-Rustaq	3	0	0	3	2	9	-7	0

=== Group C ===
Pos.	Team	GP	W	D	L	GS	GA	GD	Pts
1	Al-Tali'aa	3	3	0	0	14	1	+13	9
2	Ahli Sidab	3	1	0	2	5	5	0	3
3	Majees	2	1	0	1	2	4	-2	3
4	Khasab	2	0	0	2	0	11	-11	0

=== Group D ===
Pos.	Team	GP	W	D	L	GS	GA	GD	Pts
1	Bahla	3	2	1	0	4	1	+3	7
2	Al-Ittihad	3	1	2	0	3	1	+2	5
3	Dhofar	3	1	1	1	5	3	+2	4
4	Ja'lan	3	0	0	3	0	7	-7	0

=== Group E ===
Pos.	Team	GP	W	D	L	GS	GA	GD	Pts
1	Al-Oruba	3	3	0	0	9	1	+8	9
2	Al-Wahda	3	2	0	1	6	6	0	6
3	Al-Shabab	3	1	0	2	2	4	-2	3
4	Al-Kamel Wa Al-Wafi	3	0	0	3	1	7	-6	0

=== Group F ===
Pos.	Team	GP	W	D	L	GS	GA	GD	Pts
1	Oman	2	2	0	0	7	2	+5	6
2	Al-Nasr	1	1	0	0	4	0	+4	3
3	Fanja	2	1	0	1	5	5	0	3
4	Salalah	3	0	0	3	2	11	-9	0

=== Group G ===
Pos.	Team	GP	W	D	L	GS	GA	GD	Pts
1	Mirbat	2	1	1	0	4	3	+1	4
2	Al-Seeb	2	0	2	0	2	2	0	2
3	Al-Suwaiq	2	0	1	1	1	2	-1	1

=== Group H ===
Pos.	Team	GP	W	D	L	GS	GA	GD	Pts
1	Al-Mudhaibi	3	1	0	2	6	4	+2	3
2	Muscat	1	1	0	0	2	0	+2	3
3	Bowsher	2	1	0	1	3	3	0	3
4	Al-Salam	2	1	0	1	2	6	-4	3

=== Group Stage Results ===
The first match played was between Al-Nasr S.C.S.C. and Salalah SC on 15 August 2007. 16 teams advanced to the Round of 16.

15 August 2007	Al-Nasr	4 – 0	Salalah

15 August 2007	Muscat	2 – 0	Al-Mudhaibi

15 August 2007	Sur	7 – 2	Sohar

15 August 2007	Oman	4 – 1	Fanja

15 August 2007	Al-Khaboora	3 – 1	Nizwa

15 August 2007	Al-Salam	2 – 1	Bowsher

16 August 2007	Al-Tali'aa	8 – 0	Khasab

16 August 2007	Al-Nahda	6 – 0	Al-Musannah

16 August 2007	Al-Seeb	2 – 2	Mirbat

16 August 2007	Bahla	0 – 0	Al-Ittihad

16 August 2007	Majees	2 – 1	Ahli Sidab

17 August 2007	Dhofar	3 – 0	Ja'lan

17 August 2007	Al-Oruba	3 – 0	Al-Kamel Wa Al-Wafi

17 August 2007	Al-Wahda	2 – 1	Al-Shabab

17 August 2007	Al-Rustaq	2 – 3	Saham

22 August 2007	Dhofar	1 – 1	Al-Ittihad
19:30 UTC+4

22 August 2007	Al-Nahda	0 – 0	Nizwa
19:30 UTC+4

23 August 2007	Sur	1 – 1	Saham

23 August 2007	Oman	3 – 1	Salalah

23 August 2007	Al-Tali'aa	3 – 1	Ahli Sidab

23 August 2007	Al-Suwaiq	1 – 2	Mirbat

23 August 2007	Sohar	4 – 0	Al-Rustaq

24 August 2007	Al-Oruba	2 – 0	Al-Shabab

24 August 2007	Bahla	2 – 0	Ja'lan

24 August 2007	Al-Wahda	3 – 1	Al-Kamel Wa Al-Wafi

24 August 2007	Al-Mudhaibi	5 – 0	Al-Salam

24 August 2007	Al-Khaboora	1 – 0	Al-Musannah
19:30 UTC+4

29 August 2007	Saham	1 – 1	Sohar

29 August 2007	Al-Shabab	1 – 0	Al-Kamel Wa Al-Wafi

29 August 2007	Al-Wahda	1 – 4	Al-Oruba

29 August 2007	Al-Rustaq SC	0 – 2	Sur

30 August 2007	Dhofar	1 – 2	Bahla
20:15 UTC+4

30 August 2007	Al-Seeb	0 – 0	Al-Suwaiq
20:15 UTC+4

30 August 2007	Al-Ittihad	2 – 0	Ja'lan
20:15 UTC+4

31 August 2007	Al-Tali'aa	3 – 0	Majees

31 August 2007	Fanja	4 – 1	Salalah

31 August 2007	Nizwa	2 – 1	Al-Musannah

31 August 2007	Bowsher	2 – 1	Al-Mudhaibi

31 August 2007	Khasab	0 – 3	Ahli Sidab

== Round of 16 ==
16 teams played a knockout tie. 8 ties were played over two legs. The first match was played between Sur SC and Al-Ittihad Club on 6 September 2007. 8 teams advanced to the quarterfinals.

=== First legs ===
6 September 2007	Sur	2 – 0	Al-Ittihad

6 September 2007	Al-Nahda	1 – 1	Al-Tali'aa

6 September 2007	Bahla	3 – 2	Saham

6 September 2007	Al-Wahda	2 – 2	Mirbat

7 September 2007	Al-Oruba	1 – 0	Al-Seeb

7 September 2007	Al-Khaboora	2 – 2	Majees

10 September 2007	Al-Nasr	4 – 0	Bowsher

10 September 2007	Muscat	3 – 0	Oman

=== Second legs ===
11 September 2007	Saham	0 – 0	Bahla
19:15 UTC+4

11 September 2007	Majees	0 – 2	Al-Khaboora
19:15 UTC+4

11 September 2007	Al-Wahda	2 – 1	Mirbat
19:15 UTC+4

11 September 2007	Al-Seeb	2 – 2	Al-Oruba
19:15 UTC+4

11 September 2007	Al-Tali'aa	0 – 1	Al-Nahda
19:15 UTC+4

11 September 2007	Al-Ittihad	0 – 2	Sur
19:15 UTC+4

15 September 2007	Oman	0 – 3	Muscat

15 September 2007	Bowhser	2 – 4	Al-Nasr

== Quarterfinals ==
8 teams played a knockout tie. 4 ties were played over two legs. The first match was played between Al-Nahda Club and Bahla Club on 23 September 2007. Al-Nahda Club, Sur SC, Muscat Club and Al-Nasr S.C.S.C. qualified for the semifinals.

=== First legs ===
23 September 2007	Al-Nahda	1 – 1	Bahla
22:30 UTC+4

23 September 2007	Al-Khaboora	1 – 1	Sur
22:30 UTC+4

23 September 2007	Al-Wahda	1 – 1	Muscat
22:30 UTC+4

26 September 2007	Al-Nasr	2 – 1	Al-Oruba
22:30 UTC+4

=== Second legs ===
27 September 2007	Bahla	2 – 2	Al-Nahda
22:30 UTC+4

27 September 2007	Sur	2 – 1	Al-Khaboora
22:30 UTC+4

27 September 2007	Muscat	2 – 0	Al-Wahda
22:30 UTC+4

10 October 2007	Al-Oruba	0 – 1	Al-Nasr
21:30 UTC+4			Al-Hinai 31'

== Semifinals ==
4 teams played a knockout tie. 2 ties were played over two legs. The first match was played between Sur SC and Al-Nasr S.C.S.C. on 18 October 2007. Sur SC and Muscat Club qualified for the finals.

=== First legs ===
18 October 2007	Sur	1 – 1	Al-Nasr
19:00 UTC+4

18 October 2007	Al-Nahda	0 – 0	Muscat
21:00 UTC+4

=== Second legs ===
5 November 2007	Muscat	2 – 0	Al-Nahda
18:00 UTC+4

5 November 2007	Al-Nasr	2 – 2	Sur
20:30 UTC+4

== Finals ==
26 November 2007	Sur	1 – 1 (5 - 4 p)	Muscat
18:30 UTC+4
