= 1991–92 Omani League =

Omani League
- Season: 1991–92
- Champions: Dhofar
- Relegated: Al-Bustan; Al-Ahli
- Matches: 132
- Goals: 287 (2.17 per match)
- Top goalscorer: (Oman) Hilal Hamid (14 goals)

The 1991–92 Omani League was the 18th edition of the top football league in Oman. Fanja SC were the defending champions, having won the 1990–91 Omani League season. Dhofar S.C.S.C. emerged as the champions of the 1991–92 Omani League with a total of 48 points.

== Teams ==
This season the league had 12 teams.

=== Stadia and locations ===
Club	Home city	Stadium	Capacity
Al-Bustan	Al-Bustan	Sultan Qaboos Sports Complex / Royal Oman Police Stadium	39,000 / 18,000
Al-Ittihad	Salalah	Al-Saada Stadium / Salalah Sports Complex	12,000 / 8,000
Al-Nasr	Salalah	Al-Saada Stadium / Salalah Sports Complex	12,000 / 8,000
Al-Oruba	Sur	Sur Sports Complex	8,000
Al-Seeb	Seeb	Seeb Stadium	14,000
Al-Ahli	Sidab	Sultan Qaboos Sports Complex	39,000
Sidab	Sidab	Sultan Qaboos Sports Complex	39,000
Dhofar	Salalah	Al-Saada Stadium / Salalah Sports Complex	12,000 / 8,000
Fanja	Fanja	Seeb Stadium	14,000
Mirbat	Mirbat	Al-Saada Stadium / Salalah Sports Complex	12,000 / 8,000
Al-Hilal	Salalah	Al-Saada Stadium	12,000
Al-Shorta	Sur	Sur Sports Complex	8,000

== League table ==
Pos	Team	Pld	W	D	L	GF	GA	GD	Pts	Relegation
1	Dhofar (C)	22	15	3	4	35	10	+25	48	
2	Al-Oruba	22	13	4	5	31	15	+16	43	
3	Al-Nasr	22	9	7	6	27	22	+5	34	
4	Mirbat	22	7	8	7	32	32	0	29	
5	Al-Seeb	22	5	11	6	26	35	−9	26	
6	Al-Shorta	22	7	7	8	16	19	−3	28	
7	Sidab	22	7	6	9	18	24	−6	27	
8	Al-Hilal	22	5	10	7	19	24	−5	25	
9	Al-Ittihad	22	5	10	7	22	27	−5	25	
10	Fanja	22	4	11	7	14	19	−5	23	
11	Al-Bustan (R)	22	6	6	10	23	25	−2	24	Relegation to 1992–93 Oman First Division League
12	Al-Ahli (R)	22	2	11	9	24	35	−11	17	Relegation to 1992–93 Oman First Division League

Source: RSSSF
Rules for classification: 1) points; 2) goal difference; 3) number of goals scored.
(C) Champions; (R) Relegated

== Season statistics ==
=== Top scorers ===
Rank	Scorer	Club	Goals
1	(Oman) Hilal Hamid	Dhofar	14
