= Said Al-Shoon =

Omani footballer and manager (born 1983)

Personal information
- Full name: Said Suwailim Al-Shoon
- Date of birth: 28 August 1983 (age 43)
- Place of birth: Muscat, Oman
- Height: 1.78 m (5 ft 10 in)
- Position: Centre-back

Youth career
- 1995–1997: Fanja

Senior career*
Years	Team	Apps	(Gls)
1997–1999	Fanja	?	(?)
1999–2005	Muscat	?	(?)
2005	Al-Nasr	?	(1)
2005–2006	Al-Sailiya	?	(0)
2006–2007	Umm Salal	?	(0)
2007	Muscat	?	(0)
2007–2008	Al-Hazm	?	(0)
2008–2009	Kazma	?	(0)
2009–2010	Al-Qadisiyah	?	(0)
2010–2011	Al-Shabab	?	(0)
2011–2013	Muscat	?	(0)
Total		?	(1)

International career
2003–2011	Oman	41	(0)

Managerial career
- 2013–2014: Fanja U-19 (Assistant Manager)
- 2014–: Fanja U-23 (Assistant Manager)
- * Club domestic league appearances and goals

Said Suwailim Al-Shoon (Arabic: سعيد سويلم الشون; born 28 August 1983), commonly known as Said Al-Shoon, is an Omani football manager who is the current manager of Fanja SC U-23.

== Club career ==
Said began his professional career in 1997 with Fanja SC. After spending two years with one of Oman's best football club, he moved to Muscat Club in 1999. During his time at the Muscat-based club (previously knows as Ruwi) he won various titles which include two Omani League title in the 2002-03 and 2005-06 seasons and a runners-up place in the 2003–04 season. He also helped his club win Oman's most prestigious tournament, the Sultan Qaboos Cup in 2003 and lead his team twice to the finals in 2004 and 2007.

After spending an illustrious part of his career with Muscat club for six years, he moved to Kuwait where he signed a six-months contract with Al-Nasr SC. His only goal in league-football came for Al-Nasr SC in the 2004–05 Kuwaiti Premier League season.

In the same season he moved to Qatar where he signed a contract with Al-Sailiya SC and helped them win the Qatar Second Division Cup in 2005. At the end of the 2005-06 season, he signed a contract with another Qatari club, Umm Salal SC.

In 2007, he came back to Oman and played for his former club Muscat club.

At the end of the 2007-08 season, he made a move to Saudi Arabia and signed a one-year contract with Al-Hazm FC. He scored his second club career goal for Al-Hazm FC in a 4-2 win over Saudi Arabian giants and champions of the 2008 King Cup of Champions Al-Shabab FC.

In 2008, he came back to Kuwait and signed a one-year contract with Kuwait's top club Kazma Sporting Club.

In 2009, he again came back to Saudi Arabia and signed a one-year contract with Al-Qadisiyah FC.

After spending a long five years spell with some of the top clubs in Kuwait, Qatar and Saudi Arabia he came back to Oman and signed a one-year contract with Al-Shabab Club. In 2011, he signed a contract with his former club Muscat club. After spending two seasons with the club where he spent his best times he announced that he would retire from professional football at the end of the 2012–13 Oman Elite League season.

=== Club career statistics ===
Club	Season	Division	League		Cup		Continental		Other		Total	
Club	Season	Division	Apps	Goals	Apps	Goals	Apps	Goals	Apps	Goals	Apps	Goals
Al-Nasr	2004–05	Kuwaiti Premier League	-	1	-	0	0	0	-	0	-	1
Al-Nasr	Total		-	1	-	0	0	0	-	0	-	1
Al-Hazm	2007–08	Saudi Professional League	-	0	-	1	0	0	-	0	-	1
Al-Hazm	Total		-	0	-	1	0	0	-	0	-	1
Career total			-	1	-	1	0	0	-	0	-	2

== International career ==
Said has represented the Oman national football team from 2003 to 2011. He has made appearances in the 2004 AFC Asian Cup qualification, the 2004 AFC Asian Cup, the 2006 FIFA World Cup qualification, the 2007 AFC Asian Cup qualification, the 2007 AFC Asian Cup, the 2010 FIFA World Cup qualification and the 2011 AFC Asian Cup qualification. He announced his retirement from international football in 2011. He played his last match for Oman on 28 January 2009 in a 2011 AFC Asian Cup qualification match against Kuwait in which he came as a second-half substitute for Mohammed Al-Balushi and helped his side win the match 1-0.

== Managerial career ==
Petre holds the AFC C License, the third highest football coaching qualification in Asian Football Confederation. He began his managerial career just a few months after retiring from club football in 2013. He first began managing the club with whom he began both his youth and professional career, Fanja U-19.

== Honours ==
=== Club ===
- With Fanja U-19

- Gulf Youth Tournament (2): 1995, 1997

- With Muscat

- Omani League (2): 2002-03, 2005-06; Runners-up 2003–04
- Sultan Qaboos Cup (1): 2003 (As Ruwi); Runners up 2004, 2007
- Oman Super Cup (2): 2004, 2005

- With Al-Sailiya

- Qatar Second Division Cup (1): 2005
