= 1996–97 Omani League =

Omani League
- Season: 1996–97
- Champions: Oman
- Relegated: Al-Suwaiq; Al-Bustan; Fanja; Ruwi
- Matches: 132
- Goals: 322 (2.44 per match)
- Top goalscorer: (Oman) Said Faraj (19 goals)

The 1996–97 Omani League was the 23rd edition of the top football league in Oman. Sur SC were the defending champions, having won the 1995–96 Omani League season. Oman Club emerged as the champions of the 1996–97 Omani League with a total of 49 points.

== Teams ==
This season the number of teams in the league decreased from 14 to 12. Al-Ahli Club, Buraimi SC, Al-Khaboura SC and Mirbat SC were relegated to the Second Division League after finishing in the relegation zone in the 1995–96 season. The four relegated teams were replaced by Second Division League teams Sohar SC and Fanja SC.

=== Stadia and locations ===
Club	Home city	Stadium	Capacity
Al-Bustan	Muscat	Sultan Qaboos Sports Complex / Royal Oman Police Stadium	39,000 / 18,000
Al-Ittihad	Salalah	Al-Saada Stadium / Salalah Sports Complex	12,000 / 8,000
Al-Nasr	Salalah	Al-Saada Stadium / Salalah Sports Complex	12,000 / 8,000
Al-Oruba	Sur	Sur Sports Complex	8,000
Al-Seeb	Seeb	Seeb Stadium	14,000
Al-Suwaiq	Al-Suwaiq	Seeb Stadium	14,000
Dhofar	Salalah	Al-Saada Stadium / Salalah Sports Complex	12,000 / 8,000
Fanja	Fanja	Seeb Stadium	14,000
Ruwi	Muscat	Sultan Qaboos Sports Complex / Royal Oman Police Stadium	39,000 / 18,000
Oman	Muscat	Sultan Qaboos Sports Complex / Royal Oman Police Stadium	39,000 / 18,000
Sohar	Sohar	Sohar Regional Sports Complex	19,000
Sur	Sur	Sur Sports Complex	8,000

== League table ==
Pos	Team	Pld	W	D	L	GF	GA	GD	Pts	Relegation
1	Oman (C)	22	15	4	3	46	16	+30	49	
2	Sur	22	11	5	6	35	33	+2	38	
3	Al-Ittihad	22	11	3	8	33	25	+8	36	
4	Dhofar	22	8	6	8	40	27	+13	30	
5	Al-Seeb	22	7	8	7	23	29	−6	29	
6	Al-Nasr	22	6	10	6	31	27	+4	28	
7	Al-Oruba	22	6	10	6	24	21	+3	28	
8	Sohar	22	7	6	9	20	29	−9	27	
9	Al-Suwaiq (R)	22	6	7	9	25	22	+3	25	Relegation to 1997–98 Oman First Division League
10	Al-Bustan (R)	22	6	6	10	20	30	−10	24	Relegation to 1997–98 Oman First Division League
11	Fanja (R)	22	5	9	8	15	18	−3	24	Relegation to 1997–98 Oman First Division League
12	Ruwi (R)	22	3	8	11	10	29	−19	17	Relegation to 1997–98 Oman First Division League

Source: RSSSF
Rules for classification: 1) points; 2) goal difference; 3) number of goals scored.
(C) Champions; (R) Relegated

== Season statistics ==
=== Top scorers ===
Rank	Scorer	Club	Goals
1	(Oman) Said Faraj	Dhofar	19
