= 2008–09 Omani League =

Omani League
- Season: 2008–09
- Champions: Al-Nahda
- Relegated: Sur; Sohar
- AFC Cup: Al-Nahda; Saham
- Matches: 132
- Goals: 314 (2.38 per match)
- Top goalscorer: (Oman) Said Al-Ruzaiqi (13 goals)
- Biggest home win: Al-Nasr 4-0 Sohar (6 March 2009); Saham 5-1 Al-Shabab (29 April 2009); Al-Khaboura 4-0 Dhofar (21 May 2009)
- Biggest away win: Sohar 0-3 Al-Tali'aa (28 November 2008); Sohar 0-3 Al-Oruba (26 February 2009); Dhofar 0-3 Al-Shabab (3 April 2009); Saham 0-3 Muscat (24 April 2009); Al-Shabab 0-3 Al-Tali'aa (7 May 2009)
- Highest scoring: Al-Tali'aa 3-3 Al-Seeb (2 March 2009); Al-Nasr 4-2 Saham (21 May 2009)
- Longest winning run: (5 games); Al-Nahda; Muscat
- Longest unbeaten run: (10 games); Al-Nahda; Muscat
- Longest losing run: (5 games); Al-Shabab; Dhofar; Sohar

The 2008–09 Omani League was the 33rd edition of the top football league in Oman. It began on 23 October 2008 and finished on 27 May 2009. Al-Oruba SC were the defending champions, having won the 2007–08 Omani League season. Al-Nahda Club lost 1-0 away in their final league match against Sur SC and emerged as the champions of the 2008–09 Omani League with a total of 45 points.

== Teams ==
This season the league had 12 teams. Al-Wahda SC, Oman Club and Bahla Club were relegated to the Second Division League after finishing in the relegation zone in the 2007-08 season. The three relegated teams were replaced by Second Division League teams Sohar SC, Saham SC and Al-Shabab Club.

=== Stadia and locations ===
Club	Home city	Stadium	Capacity
Al-Khaboura	Al-Khaboura	Sohar Regional Sports Complex	19,000
Al-Nahda	Al-Buraimi	Nizwa Sports Complex	10,000
Al-Nasr	Salalah	Al-Saada Stadium / Salalah Sports Complex	12,000 / 8,000
Al-Oruba	Sur	Sur Sports Complex	8,000
Al-Seeb	Seeb	Seeb Stadium	14,000
Al-Shabab	Barka	Seeb Stadium	14,000
Al-Tali'aa	Sur	Sur Sports Complex	8,000
Dhofar	Salalah	Al-Saada Stadium / Salalah Sports Complex	12,000 / 8,000
Muscat	Muscat	Sultan Qaboos Sports Complex / Royal Oman Police Stadium	39,000 / 18,000
Saham	Saham	Sohar Regional Sports Complex	19,000
Sohar	Sohar	Sohar Regional Sports Complex	19,000
Sur	Sur	Sur Sports Complex	8,000

== League table ==
Pos	Team	Pld	W	D	L	GF	GA	GD	Pts	Qualification or relegation
1	Al-Nahda (C)	22	13	6	3	32	15	+17	45	2010 AFC Cup group stage
2	Muscat	22	9	10	3	24	13	+11	37	
3	Al-Oruba	22	9	9	4	26	14	+12	36	2009–10 Gulf Club Champions Cup Group stage
4	Al-Khaboura	22	9	8	5	27	19	+8	35	
5	Saham	22	8	6	8	30	29	+1	30	2010 AFC Cup group stage (Note: Saham were the second representative from Oman as the winners 2009 Sultan Qaboos Cup.)
6	Al-Shabab	22	8	6	8	27	31	−4	30	
7	Dhofar	22	9	2	11	24	33	−9	29	
8	Al-Tali'aa	22	8	4	10	32	31	+1	28	
9	Al-Seeb	22	5	11	6	25	24	+1	26	
10	Al-Nasr	22	6	7	9	28	30	−2	25	Relegation Playoff
11	Sur (R)	22	5	6	11	20	33	−13	21	Relegation to 2009–10 Oman First Division League
12	Sohar (R)	22	3	5	14	19	42	−23	14	Relegation to 2009–10 Oman First Division League

Updated to match(es) played on 27 May 2009. Source:
Rules for classification: 1) points; 2) goal difference; 3) number of goals scored.
(C) Champions; (R) Relegated

== Results ==
Home \ Away	ALK	ALNH	ALN	ALO	ALS	ALSH	ALT	DHO	MCT	SAH	SOH	SUR
Al-Khaboura		0–1	1–0	1–1	1–1	1–1	2–2	4–0	1–0	2–1	2–1	1–1
Al-Nahda	1–0		1–0	2–1	1–3	2–0	3–1	3–1	1–0	3–0	1–1	2–0
Al-Nasr	1–3	0–0		2–3	2–2	2–2	1–2	2–0	0–0	4–2	4–0	1–1
Al-Oruba	0–0	1–1	1–2		0–0	0–1	2–1	4–1	0–0	0–0	1–1	3–0
Al-Seeb	1–0	0–0	1–1	0–1		0–0	0–0	1–2	3–0	1–3	0–1	2–2
Al-Shabab	1–2	1–3	1–0	1–1	0–1		0–3	1–2	1–1	1–0	3–1	3–1
Al-Tali'aa	2–3	2–3	1–0	0–1	3–3	1–3		2–0	0–1	0–1	2–2	1–0
Dhofar	2–1	1–0	0–0	0–2	0–2	0–3	2–3		1–1	3–0	3–0	3–0
Muscat	1–1	1–1	4–1	0–0	0–0	3–0	2–1	1–0		0–0	3–1	1–1
Saham	0–1	1–1	3–1	1–0	1–1	5–1	1–2	3–0	0–3		1–1	3–2
Sohar	1–0	0–2	0–1	0–3	3–1	2–3	0–3	0–1	0–1	2–2		1–2
Sur	0–0	1–0	2–3	0–1	3–2	0–0	1–0	0–2	0–1	0–2	3–1	

Updated to match(es) played on 27 May 2009. Source:
Legend: Blue = home team win; Yellow = draw; Red = away team win.

== Season statistics ==
As of 27 May 2009

=== Top scorers ===
Rank	Scorer	Club	Goals
1	(Oman) Said Al-Ruzaiqi	Al-Tali'aa	13
2	(Brazil) Aoerson D'Costa	Al-Oruba	11
2	(Oman) Mohammed Al Mashaikhi	Al-Suwaiq	11
3	(Oman) Hassan Al-Ajmi	Sohar	8
3	(Gabon) Etienne Bito'o	Dhofar	8
3	(Oman) Doaej Khalfan	Al-Khaboura	8
6	(Brazil) Rodrigo Jorge	Muscat	7
6	(Oman) Qasim Said	Al-Nasr	7
6	(Oman) Hani Al-Dhabit	Dhofar	7
6	(Oman) Sultan Al-Fulaiti	Al-Seeb	7

== Media coverage ==
Oman Mobile League Media Coverage
Country	Television Channel	Matches
Oman	Oman TV2	3 Matches per round

== See also ==
- 2008 Sultan Qaboos Cup
