= 2022–23 Oman Professional League =

Oman Professional League
- Season: 2022–23
- Champions: Al-Nahda (4th title)
- Relegated: Al-Orouba SC, Al-Ittihad, Al-Bashaeer.
- AFC Champions League: Al-Seeb
- AFC Cup: Al-Nahda

The 2022–23 Oman Professional League is the 47th edition of the Oman Professional League, the top football league in Oman. The season started on 18 August 2022.

== Teams ==
Team	Location	Stadium	Capacity
Dhofar Club	Salalah	Al-Saada Stadium	20,000
Al-Seeb Club	Seeb	Al-Seeb Stadium	14,000
Sohar SC	Sohar	Sohar Club Stadium	3,350
Al-Orouba SC	Sur	Sur Sports Complex	8,000
Oman Club	Muscat	Sultan Qaboos Sports Complex	28,000
Bosher Club	Bosher, Muscat	Sultan Qaboos Sports Complex Royal Oman Police Stadium	28,000 12,000
Al-Nasr SC	Salalah	Al-Saada Stadium	20,000
Bahla Club	Bahla	Nizwa Sports Complex	10,000
Al Rustaq Club	Rustaq	Rustaq Sports Complex	17,000
Suwaiq Club	Seeb	Al-Seeb Stadium	14,000
Al-Nahda Club	Al-Buraimi	Al-Buraimi Sports Stadium	17,000
Al-Ittihad Club	Salalah	Al-Saada Stadium	20,000
Sur SC	Sur	Sur Sports Complex	8,000
Al-Musannah SC	Seeb	Al-Seeb Stadium	14,000

== League table ==
Pos	Team	Pld	W	D	L	GF	GA	GD	Pts	Qualification or relegation
1	Al-Nahda (C)	26	16	8	2	34	8	+26	56	Qualification for 2023-24 AFC Cup qualifying play-offs
2	Al-Suwaiq	26	16	4	6	36	21	+15	52	
3	Al-Seeb	26	14	9	3	36	14	+22	51	Qualification for 2023-24 AFC Champions League qualifying play-offs
4	Dhofar	26	13	6	7	34	19	+15	45	
5	Al-Rustaq	26	12	7	7	26	23	+3	43	
6	Bahla	26	11	7	8	34	30	+4	40	
7	Oman	26	9	10	7	25	23	+2	37	
8	Sohar	26	11	4	11	24	24	0	37	
9	Al-Musannah SC	26	7	12	7	22	24	−2	33	
10	Al-Nasr	26	7	9	10	21	26	−5	30	
11	Sur Club	26	8	4	14	22	29	−7	28	
12	Al-Orouba SC (R)	26	3	8	15	22	45	−23	17	Relegation to Oman First Division League
13	Al-Ittihad Club (R)	26	4	5	17	14	37	−23	17	Relegation to Oman First Division League
14	Bosher Club (R)	26	3	3	20	17	44	−27	12	Relegation to Oman First Division League

Updated to match(es) played on 14 May 2022. Source:
Rules for classification: 1) Points; 2) Goal difference; 3) Goals scored.
(C) Champions; (R) Relegated

== Attendances ==
#	Football club	Average attendance
1	Al-Seeb Club	1,103
2	Dhofar Club	1,099
3	Al-Nahda Club	922
4	Al-Suwaiq Club	876
5	Al-Rustaq Club	660
6	Sohar SC	617
7	Bahla Club	604
8	Al-Nasr SC	593
9	Oman Club	529
10	Al-Mussanah Club	490
11	Sur SC	411
12	Al-Orouba SC	252
13	Al-Ittihad Club	234
14	Bosher Club	219
