= 2006 Sultan Qaboos Cup =

Tournament details
- Country: Oman
- Teams: 31

Final positions
- Champions: Dhofar
- Runners-up: Sur

Tournament statistics
- Matches played: 65
- Goals scored: 231 (3.55 per match)

The 2006 Sultan Qaboos Cup was the 34th edition of the Sultan Qaboos Cup (Arabic: كأس السلطان قابوس), the premier knockout tournament for football teams in Oman.

The competition began on 19 August 2006 with the group stage and concluded on 20 November 2006. Al-Nasr S.C.S.C. were the defending champions, having won their fourth title in 2005. On Monday 20 November 2006, Dhofar S.C.S.C. were crowned the champions of the 2006 Sultan Qaboos Cup when they defeated Sur SC 2–1, winning the title for the seventh time.

== Teams ==
This 2006 edition of the tournament had 31 teams. The winners qualified for the 2007 AFC Cup.

- Ahli Sidab Club (Sidab)
- Al-Hamra SC (Al-Hamra)
- Al-Ittihad Club (Salalah)
- Al-Kamel Wa Al-Wafi SC
- Al-Khaboora SC (Al-Khaboora)
- Al-Mudhaibi SC (Al-Mudhaibi)
- Al-Musannah SC (Al-Musannah)
- Al-Nahda Club (Al-Buraimi)
- Al-Nasr S.C.S.C. (Salalah)
- Al-Oruba SC (Sur)
- Al-Rustaq SC (Rustaq)
- Al-Salam SC (Sohar)
- Al-Seeb Club (Seeb)
- Al-Shabab Club (Seeb)
- Al-Suwaiq Club (Suwaiq
- Al-Tali'aa SC (Sur)
- Al-Wahda SC (Sur)
- Bahla Club (Bahla)
- Bowsher Club (Bawshar)
- Dhofar S.C.S.C. (Salalah)
- Fanja SC (Fanja)
- Ja'lan SC (Jalan Bani Bu Ali)
- Khasab SC (Khasab)
- Majees SC (Majees)
- Mirbat SC (Mirbat)
- Muscat Club (Muscat)
- Nizwa Club (Nizwa)
- Oman Club (Muscat)
- Quriyat Club (Quriyat)
- Saham SC (Saham)
- Samail SC (Samail)
- Salalah SC (Salalah)
- Sohar SC (Sohar)
- Sur SC (Sur)

== Group stage ==
=== Group A ===
| Pos. | Team | GP | W | D | L | GS | GA | GD | Pts |
|---|---|---|---|---|---|---|---|---|---|
| 1 | Al-Tali'aa | 3 | 3 | 0 | 0 | 9 | 1 | +8 | 9 |
| 2 | Majees | 3 | 2 | 0 | 1 | 4 | 4 | 0 | 6 |
| 3 | Al-Rustaq | 3 | 1 | 0 | 2 | 4 | 5 | -1 | 3 |
| 4 | Salalah | 3 | 0 | 0 | 3 | 3 | 10 | -7 | 0 |

=== Group B ===
| Pos. | Team | GP | W | D | L | GS | GA | GD | Pts |
|---|---|---|---|---|---|---|---|---|---|
| 1 | Bahla | 2 | 2 | 0 | 0 | 10 | 0 | +10 | 6 |
| 2 | Oman | 2 | 1 | 0 | 1 | 3 | 5 | -2 | 3 |
| 3 | Al-Hamra | 2 | 0 | 0 | 2 | 1 | 9 | -8 | 0 |

=== Group C ===
| Pos. | Team | GP | W | D | L | GS | GA | GD | Pts |
|---|---|---|---|---|---|---|---|---|---|
| 1 | Al-Nahda | 3 | 3 | 0 | 0 | 14 | 4 | +10 | 9 |
| 2 | Fanja | 3 | 2 | 0 | 1 | 9 | 4 | +5 | 6 |
| 3 | Quriyat | 3 | 1 | 0 | 2 | 6 | 17 | -11 | 3 |
| 4 | Ja'lan | 3 | 0 | 0 | 3 | 6 | 10 | -4 | 0 |

=== Group D ===
| Pos. | Team | GP | W | D | L | GS | GA | GD | Pts |
|---|---|---|---|---|---|---|---|---|---|
| 1 | Sur | 3 | 2 | 1 | 0 | 5 | 1 | +4 | 7 |
| 2 | Al-Wahda | 3 | 1 | 2 | 0 | 3 | 2 | +1 | 5 |
| 3 | Al-Ittihad | 2 | 0 | 1 | 1 | 1 | 3 | -2 | 1 |
| 4 | Sohar | 2 | 0 | 0 | 2 | 2 | 5 | -3 | 0 |

=== Group E ===
| Pos. | Team | GP | W | D | L | GS | GA | GD | Pts |
|---|---|---|---|---|---|---|---|---|---|
| 1 | Muscat | 3 | 3 | 0 | 0 | 18 | 1 | +17 | 9 |
| 2 | Al-Salam | 3 | 2 | 0 | 1 | 8 | 7 | +1 | 6 |
| 3 | Ahli Sidab | 3 | 1 | 0 | 2 | 2 | 8 | -6 | 3 |
| 4 | Al-Mudhaibi | 3 | 0 | 0 | 3 | 1 | 13 | -12 | 0 |

=== Group F ===
| Pos. | Team | GP | W | D | L | GS | GA | GD | Pts |
|---|---|---|---|---|---|---|---|---|---|
| 1 | Dhofar | 3 | 3 | 0 | 0 | 18 | 0 | +18 | 9 |
| 2 | Al-Nasr | 3 | 2 | 0 | 1 | 7 | 1 | +6 | 6 |
| 3 | Nizwa | 3 | 1 | 0 | 2 | 3 | 6 | -3 | 3 |
| 4 | Khasab | 3 | 0 | 0 | 3 | 0 | 21 | -21 | 0 |

=== Group G ===
| Pos. | Team | GP | W | D | L | GS | GA | GD | Pts |
|---|---|---|---|---|---|---|---|---|---|
| 1 | Al-Oruba | 3 | 2 | 1 | 0 | 5 | 1 | +4 | 7 |
| 2 | Al-Khaboora | 3 | 1 | 2 | 0 | 5 | 2 | +3 | 5 |
| 3 | Saham | 3 | 1 | 1 | 1 | 3 | 5 | -2 | 4 |
| 4 | Samail | 3 | 0 | 0 | 3 | 1 | 6 | -5 | 0 |

=== Group H ===
| Pos. | Team | GP | W | D | L | GS | GA | GD | Pts |
|---|---|---|---|---|---|---|---|---|---|
| 1 | Al-Suwaiq | 3 | 2 | 0 | 1 | 8 | 5 | +3 | 6 |
| 2 | Al-Seeb | 3 | 2 | 0 | 1 | 6 | 3 | +3 | 6 |
| 3 | Al-Shabab | 3 | 1 | 1 | 1 | 4 | 6 | -2 | 4 |
| 4 | Bowsher | 3 | 0 | 1 | 2 | 2 | 6 | -4 | 1 |

=== Group Stage Results ===
The first match played was between Al-Nasr S.C.S.C. and Khasab SC on 19 August 2006. 16 teams advanced to the Round of 16.

| 19 August 2006 | Al-Nasr | 4 – 0 | Khasab |
| 19:15 UTC+4 |

| 19 August 2006 | Muscat | 9 – 0 | Al-Mudhaibi |
| 19:15 UTC+4 |

| 23 August 2006 | Al-Seeb | 2 – 0 | Bowsher |
| 19:15 UTC+4 |

| 23 August 2006 | Al-Suwaiq | 4 – 1 | Al-Shabab |
| 19:15 UTC+4 |

| 23 August 2006 | Al-Khaboora | 1 – 1 | Saham |
| 19:15 UTC+4 |

| 23 August 2006 | Bahla | 6 – 0 | Al-Hamra |
| 19:15 UTC+4 |

| 24 August 2006 | Majees | 2 – 0 | Salalah |
| 17:45 UTC+4 |

| 24 August 2006 | Sur | 3 – 1 | Sohar |
| 19:15 UTC+4 |

| 24 August 2006 | Al-Tali'aa | 2 – 1 | Al-Rustaq |
| 19:15 UTC+4 |

| 24 August 2006 | Al-Nahda | 8 – 1 | Quriyat |
| 19:15 UTC+4 |

| 24 August 2006 | Al-Wahda | 1 – 1 | Al-Ittihad |
| 20:00 UTC+4 |

| 25 August 2006 | Dhofar | 3 – 0 | Nizwa |
| 19:15 UTC+4 |

| 25 August 2006 | Fanja | 2 – 1 | Ja'lan |
| 19:15 UTC+4 |

| 25 August 2006 | Al-Salam | 5 – 0 | Ahli Sidab |
| 19:15 UTC+4 |

| 25 August 2006 | Al-Oruba | 1 – 0 | Samail |
| 19:15 UTC+4 |

| 30 August 2006 | Al-Shabab | 1 – 0 | Al-Seeb |
| 19:00 UTC+4 |

| 31 August 2006 | Al-Ittihad | 0 – 2 | Sur |
| 17:45 UTC+4 |

| 31 August 2006 | Khasab | 0 – 14 | Dhofar |
| 17:45 UTC+4 |

| 31 August 2006 | Salalah | 1 – 4 | Al-Tali'aa |
| 19:00 UTC+4 |

| 31 August 2006 | Ja'lan | 2 – 4 | Al-Nahda |
| 19:00 UTC+4 |

| 31 August 2006 | Al-Rustaq | 0 – 2 | Majees |
| 19:00 UTC+4 |

| 31 August 2006 | Al-Hamra | 1 – 3 | Oman |
| 19:00 UTC+4 |

| 31 August 2006 | Saham | 0 – 3 | Al-Oruba |
| 20:00 UTC+4 |

| 31 August 2006 | Al-Mudhaibi | 1 – 2 | Al-Salam |
| 20:00 UTC+4 |

| 1 September 2006 | Quriyat | 1 – 6 | Fanja |
| 19:00 UTC+4 |

| 1 September 2006 | Sohar | 1 – 2 | Al-Wahda |
| 19:00 UTC+4 |

| 1 September 2006 | Bowsher | 0 – 2 | Al-Suwaiq |
| 19:00 UTC+4 |

| 1 September 2006 | Samail | 0 – 3 | Al-Khaboora |
| 19:00 UTC+4 |

| 7 September 2006 | Nizwa | 0 – 3 | Al-Nasr |
| 19:00 UTC+4 |

| 8 September 2006 | Ja'lan | 3 – 4 | Quriyat |
| 19:00 UTC+4 |

| 8 September 2006 | Al-Nahda | 2 – 1 | Fanja |
| 19:00 UTC+4 |

| 8 September 2006 | Ahli Sidab | 0 – 3 | Muscat |
| 19:00 UTC+4 |

| 14 September 2006 | Muscat | 6 – 1 | Al-Salam |
| 18:45 UTC+4 |

| 14 September 2006 | Sur | 0 – 0 | Al-Wahda |
| 18:45 UTC+4 |

| 14 September 2006 | Ahli Sidab | 2 – 0 | Al-Mudhaibi |
| 18:45 UTC+4 |

| 14 September 2006 | Al-Tali'aa | 4 – 0 | Majees |
| 19:00 UTC+4 |

| 14 September 2006 | Salalah | 2 – 4 | Al-Rustaq |
| 19:00 UTC+4 |

| 14 September 2006 | Bahla | 4 – 0 | Oman |
| 20:00 UTC+4 |

| 15 September 2006 | Al-Oruba | 1 – 1 | Al-Khaboora |
| 18:45 UTC+4 |

| 15 September 2006 | Saham | 2 – 1 | Samail |
| 18:45 UTC+4 |

| 15 September 2006 | Al-Seeb | 4 – 2 | Al-Suwaiq |
| 18:45 UTC+4 |

| 15 September 2006 | Al-Shabab | 2 – 2 | Bowsher |
| 18:45 UTC+4 |

| 15 September 2006 | Al-Nasr | 0 – 1 | Dhofar |
| 19:00 UTC+4 |

| 15 September 2006 | Nizwa | 3 – 0 | Khasab |
| 19:00 UTC+4 |

== Round of 16 ==
16 teams played a knockout tie. 8 ties were played over one leg. The first match was played between Oman Club and Sur SC on 21 September 2006. 8 teams advanced to the quarterfinals.

| 21 September 2006 | Oman | 1 – 3 | Sur |
| 17:30 UTC+4 |

| 21 September 2006 | Bahla | 3 – 1 | Al-Wahda |
| 17:30 UTC+4 |

| 21 September 2006 | Al-Tali'aa | 1 – 2 | Fanja |
| 18:30 UTC+4 |

| 21 September 2006 | Al-Khaboora | 2 – 1 | Muscat |
| 19:30 UTC+4 |

| 22 September 2006 | Al-Oruba | 2 – 1 | Al-Salam |
| 18:30 UTC+4 |

| 22 September 2006 | Al-Suwaiq | 3 – 4 | Dhofar |
| 19:00 UTC+4 |

| 23 September 2006 | Al-Nasr | 1 – 3 | Al-Seeb |

| 24 September 2006 | Al-Nahda | 3 – 1 | Majees |

== Quarterfinals ==
8 teams played a knockout tie. 4 ties were played over two legs. The first match was played between Sur SC and Al-Nahda Club on 28 September 2006. Sur SC, Al-Seeb Club, Dhofar S.C.S.C. and Bahla Club qualified for the semifinals.

=== First legs ===
| 28 September 2006 | Sur | 1 – 1 | Al-Nahda |

| 28 September 2006 | Al-Seeb | 1 – 0 | Al-Oruba |

| 28 September 2006 | Al-Khaboora | 1 – 1 | Dhofar |

| 28 September 2006 | Bahla | 1 – 0 | Fanja |

=== Second legs ===
| 5 October 2006 | Al-Oruba | 1 – 1 | Al-Seeb |
| 21:30 UTC+4 |

| 5 October 2006 | Fanja | 1 - 1 | Bahla |
| 21:30 UTC+4 |

| 5 October 2006 | Dhofar | v | Al-Khaboora |
| 22:00 UTC+4 |

| 6 October 2006 | Al-Nahda | 2 – 2 | Sur |
| 21:30 UTC+4 |

== Semifinals ==
4 teams played a knockout tie. 2 ties were played over two legs. The first match was played between Sur SC and Al-Seeb Club on 16 October 2006. Sur SC and Dhofar S.C.S.C. qualified for the Finals.

=== First legs ===
| 16 October 2006 | Sur | 1 – 0 | Al-Seeb |

| 16 October 2006 | Bahla | 0 – 0 | Dhofar |

=== Second legs ===
| 20 October 2006 | Al-Seeb | 2 – 1 | Sur |

| 20 October 2006 | Dhofar | 3 – 0 | Bahla |

== Third Place ==
| 17 November 2006 | Al-Seeb | 1 – 1 (4 - 5 p) | Bahla |
| 18:30 UTC+4 |

== Finals ==
| 20 November 2006 | Sur | 1 – 2 | Dhofar |
| 19:15 UTC+4 |
