= 2005–06 Omani League =

Omani League
- Season: 2005–06
- Champions: Muscat
- Relegated: Al-Suwaiq; Oman
- AFC Cup: Muscat; Dhofar
- Matches: 132
- Goals: 327 (2.48 per match)
- Top goalscorer: (Oman) Salem Al-Shamsi (12 goals)
- Biggest home win: Al-Nahda 4-0 Mjees (10 November 2005); Al-Nahda 4-0 Oman (6 April 2006)
- Biggest away win: Sur 0-4 Muscat (4 May 2006)
- Highest scoring: Al-Tali'aa 4-3 Al-Nasr (29 December 2005); Oman 2-5 Al-Tali'aa (19 January 2006); Bahla 5-2 Mjees (30 March 2006); Muscat 4-3 Dhofar (19 May 2006)
- Longest winning run: (3 games); Muscat; Al-Nahda; Al-Tali'aa; Al-Oruba
- Longest unbeaten run: (13 games); Al-Tali'aa
- Longest losing run: (7 games); Oman

The 2005–06 Omani League was the 30th edition of the top football league in Oman. It began on 9 November 2005 and finished on 19 May 2006. Dhofar S.C.S.C. were the defending champions, having won the 2004–05 Omani League season. Muscat Club won 4-3 at home in their final league match against Dhofar S.C.S.C. and emerged as the champions of the 2005–06 Omani League with a total of 45 points.

== Teams ==
This season the league had decreased from 13 to 12 teams. Al-Ahli Club, Al-Ittihad Club and Al-Khaboura SC were relegated to the Second Division League after finishing in the relegation zone in the 2004–05 season. The three relegated teams were replaced by Second Division League teams Al-Suwaiq Club and Mjees SC.

=== Stadia and locations ===
Club	Home city	Stadium	Capacity
Al-Nahda	Al-Buraimi	Nizwa Sports Complex	10,000
Al-Nasr	Salalah	Al-Saada Stadium / Salalah Sports Complex	12,000 / 8,000
Al-Oruba	Sur	Sur Sports Complex	8,000
Al-Seeb	Seeb	Seeb Stadium	14,000
Al-Suwaiq	Al-Suwaiq	Seeb Stadium	14,000
Bahla	Bahla	Seeb Stadium	14,000
Al-Tali'aa	Sur	Sur Sports Complex	8,000
Dhofar	Salalah	Al-Saada Stadium / Salalah Sports Complex	12,000 / 8,000
Muscat	Muscat	Sultan Qaboos Sports Complex / Royal Oman Police Stadium	39,000 / 18,000
Oman	Muscat	Sultan Qaboos Sports Complex / Royal Oman Police Stadium	39,000 / 18,000
Mjees	Majees	Sohar Regional Sports Complex	19,000
Sur	Sur	Sur Sports Complex	8,000

== League table ==
Pos	Team	Pld	W	D	L	GF	GA	GD	Pts	Qualification or relegation
1	Muscat (C)	22	13	6	3	33	15	+18	45	2007 AFC Cup group stage
2	Al-Nahda	22	12	7	3	39	18	+21	43	
3	Al-Tali'aa	22	11	10	1	35	22	+13	43	
4	Al-Nasr	22	11	2	9	32	27	+5	35	
5	Sur	22	9	6	7	26	25	+1	33	
6	Al-Oruba	22	9	5	8	26	25	+1	32	
7	Al-Seeb	22	7	6	9	21	24	−3	27	
8	Bahla	22	6	7	9	27	37	−10	25	
9	Dhofar	22	6	5	11	22	26	−4	23	2007 AFC Cup group stage (Note: Dhofar were the second representative from Oman as the winners of 2006 Sultan Qaboos Cup)
10	Mjees	22	6	4	12	22	37	−15	22	Relegation Playoff
11	Al-Suwaiq (R)	22	4	9	9	27	29	−2	21	Relegation to 2006–07 Oman First Division League
12	Oman (R)	22	1	7	14	17	42	−25	10	Relegation to 2006–07 Oman First Division League

Updated to match(es) played on 19 May 2006. Source: League Table
Rules for classification: 1) points; 2) goal difference; 3) number of goals scored.
(C) Champions; (R) Relegated

== Results ==
Home \ Away	ALNH	ALN	ALO	ALS	ALSU	BAH	ALT	DHO	MCT	OMA	MJS	SUR
Al-Nahda		1–0	2–3	2–0	1–0	2–0	2–2	3–1	1–1	4–0	4–0	1–0
Al-Nasr	1–0		0–0	2–0	2–1	0–1	2–2	0–1	1–2	3–1	2–1	3–1
Al-Oruba	0–1	1–3		0–0	3–2	3–1	1–1	2–1	2–1	2–0	2–1	0–2
Al-Seeb	1–1	2–0	2–1		0–2	0–0	3–1	1–3	0–0	0–0	0–0	0–2
Al-Suwaiq	1–1	0–1	3–0	1–4		3–0	0–1	2–2	0–1	2–2	2–1	2–3
Bahla	1–4	1–0	0–3	2–1	3–3		1–1	1–2	1–3	4–2	5–2	1–3
Al-Tali'aa	1–1	4–3	2–1	2–1	0–0	0–0		1–0	0–0	1–0	4–1	3–3
Dhofar	0–1	0–1	0–0	1–0	1–1	1–1	1–2		0–0	0–1	0–1	2–0
Muscat	2–2	2–0	1–0	1–2	1–0	3–1	0–1	4–3		1–0	1–0	1–0
Oman	1–4	2–4	1–2	0–2	0–0	0–0	2–5	1–2	1–1		1–2	1–1
Mjees	0–0	2–3	0–0	0–1	2–2	1–3	0–1	2–1	0–3	2–1		2–1
Sur	3–1	2–1	1–0	3–1	0–0	0–0	0–0	1–0	0–4	0–0	0–2	

Updated to match(es) played on 19 May 2006. Source: Results
Legend: Blue = home team win; Yellow = draw; Red = away team win.

== Season statistics ==
As of 19 May 2006

=== Top scorers ===
Rank	Scorer	Club	Goals
1	(Oman) Salem Al-Shamsi	Al-Nahda	12
1	(Oman) Ismail Al Ajmi	Muscat	12
2	(Oman) Osama Subait	Al-Tali'aa	7

== Media coverage ==
Oman Mobile League Media Coverage
Country	Television Channel	Matches
Oman	Oman TV2	3 Matches per round

== See also ==
- 2005 Sultan Qaboos Cup
