= 1987–88 Omani League =

Omani League
- Season: 1987–88
- Champions: Fanja
- Relegated: Al-Musannah; Ruwi
- Matches: 132
- Goals: 478 (3.62 per match)

The 1987–88 Omani League was the 14th edition of the top football league in Oman. Fanja SC were defending their title, having won the 1986–87 Omani League season. Fanja SC emerged as the champions of the 1987–88 Omani League with a total of 49 points.

== Teams ==
This season the league had 12 teams.

=== Stadia and locations ===
| Club | Home city | Stadium | Capacity |
|---|---|---|---|
| Muttrah | Muttrah | Sultan Qaboos Sports Complex / Royal Oman Police Stadium | 39,000 / 18,000 |
| Al-Ittihad | Salalah | Al-Saada Stadium / Salalah Sports Complex | 12,000 / 8,000 |
| Al-Musannah | Al-Musannah | Seeb Stadium | 14,000 |
| Al-Nasr | Salalah | Al-Saada Stadium / Salalah Sports Complex | 12,000 / 8,000 |
| Al-Oruba | Sur | Sur Sports Complex | 8,000 |
| Al-Seeb | Seeb | Seeb Stadium | 14,000 |
| Al-Ahli | Sidab | Sultan Qaboos Sports Complex | 39,000 |
| Dhofar | Salalah | Al-Saada Stadium / Salalah Sports Complex | 12,000 / 8,000 |
| Fanja | Fanja | Seeb Stadium | 14,000 |
| Oman | Muscat | Sultan Qaboos Sports Complex / Royal Oman Police Stadium | 39,000 / 18,000 |
| Ruwi | Muscat | Sultan Qaboos Sports Complex / Royal Oman Police Stadium | 39,000 / 18,000 |
| Al-Hilal | Salalah | Al-Saada Stadium | 12,000 |

== League table ==
| Pos | Team | Pld | W | D | L | GF | GA | GD | Pts | Relegation |
|---|---|---|---|---|---|---|---|---|---|---|
| 1 | Fanja (C) | 22 | 14 | 7 | 1 | 55 | 13 | +42 | 49 | |
| 2 | Dhofar | 22 | 15 | 4 | 3 | 54 | 18 | +36 | 49 | |
| 3 | Al-Nasr | 22 | 13 | 8 | 1 | 53 | 19 | +34 | 47 | |
| 4 | Al-Seeb | 22 | 9 | 8 | 5 | 38 | 25 | +13 | 35 | |
| 5 | Al-Oruba | 22 | 10 | 5 | 7 | 52 | 45 | +7 | 35 | |
| 6 | Al-Ittihad | 22 | 8 | 5 | 9 | 40 | 46 | −6 | 29 | |
| 7 | Al-Hilal | 22 | 7 | 6 | 9 | 34 | 38 | −4 | 27 | |
| 8 | Oman | 22 | 5 | 9 | 8 | 37 | 33 | +4 | 24 | |
| 9 | Al-Ahli | 22 | 3 | 11 | 8 | 24 | 26 | −2 | 20 | |
| 10 | Muttrah | 22 | 6 | 5 | 11 | 26 | 50 | −24 | 23 | |
| 11 | Al-Musannah (R) | 22 | 4 | 1 | 17 | 36 | 65 | −29 | 13 | Relegation to 1988–89 Oman First Division League |
| 12 | Ruwi (R) | 22 | 2 | 3 | 17 | 29 | 80 | −51 | 9 | Relegation to 1988–89 Oman First Division League |

Source: RSSSF
Rules for classification: 1) points; 2) goal difference; 3) number of goals scored.
(C) Champions; (R) Relegated
