= 2004 Sultan Qaboos Cup =

Tournament details
- Country: Oman
- Teams: 32

Final positions
- Champions: Al-Nasr
- Runners-up: Al-Seeb

Tournament statistics
- Matches played: 37
- Goals scored: 106 (2.86 per match)

The 2004 Sultan Qaboos Cup was the 32nd edition of the Sultan Qaboos Cup (Arabic: كأس السلطان قابوس), the premier knockout tournament for football teams in Oman.

The competition began on 15 September 2004 with the Round of 32 and concluded on 23 November 2004. Ruwi Club were the defending champions, having won their first title in 2003. Dhofar S.C.S.C. were crowned the champions of the 2004 Sultan Qaboos Cup, winning the title for the sixth time. They defeated Muscat Club 1–0.

== Teams ==
This year the tournament had 32 teams.

- Ahli Sidab Club (Sidab)
- Al-Ittihad Club (Salalah)
- Al-Khaboora SC (Al-Khaboora)
- Al-Mudhaibi SC (Al-Mudhaibi)
- Al-Musannah SC (Al-Musannah)
- Al-Nahda Club (Al-Buraimi)
- Al-Nasr S.C.S.C. (Salalah)
- Al-Oruba SC (Sur)
- Al-Rustaq SC (Rustaq)
- Al-Salam SC (Sohar)
- Al-Seeb Club (Seeb)
- Al-Shabab Club (Seeb)
- Al-Suwaiq Club (Suwaiq
- Al-Tali'aa SC (Sur)
- Al-Wahda SC (Sur)
- Bahla Club (Bahla)
- Dhofar S.C.S.C. (Salalah)
- Fanja SC (Fanja)
- Ibri Club (Ibri)
- Ja'lan SC (Jalan Bani Bu Ali)
- Madha SC (Madha)
- Majees SC (Majees)
- Mirbat SC (Mirbat)
- Muscat Club (Muscat)
- Nizwa Club (Nizwa)
- Oman Club (Muscat)
- Quriyat Club (Quriyat)
- Saham SC (Saham)
- Salalah SC (Salalah)
- Sohar SC (Sohar)
- Sur SC (Sur)
- Yanqul SC (Yanqul)

=== Round of 32 ===
32 teams played a knockout tie. 16 ties were played over one leg. The first match played was between Al-Nasr S.C.S.C. and Yanqul SC on 15 September 2004. 16 teams advanced to the Round of 16.

15 September 2004	Al-Nasr	5 – 0	Yanqul

15 September 2004	Muscat	1 – 0	Al-Wahda

15 September 2004	Oman	1 – 0	Al-Mudhaibi

15 September 2004	Al-Oruba	6 – 1	Al-Shabab

16 September 2004	Dhofar	3 – 0	Ja'lan

16 September 2004	Sur	3 – 0	Mirbat

16 September 2004	Al-Tali'aa	4 – 2	Ahli Sidab

16 September 2004	Al-Nahda	1 – 0	Al-Salam

16 September 2004	Al-Seeb	7 – 0	Madha

16 September 2004	Al-Khaboora	1 – 0	Fanja
17:40 UTC+4

16 September 2004	Al-Musannah	1 – 0	Bahla
19:00 UTC+4

17 September 2004	Saham	2 – 1	Salalah
19:00 UTC+4

17 September 2004	Al-Suwaiq	3 – 1	Quriyat
19:00 UTC+4

17 September 2004	Al-Ittihad	2 – 0	Al-Rustaq
19:00 UTC+4

17 September 2004	Majees	0 – 1	Sohar
19:40 UTC+4

17 September 2004	Nizwa	1 – 0	Ibri
19:00 UTC+4

== Round of 16 ==
16 teams played a knockout tie. 8 ties were played over one leg. The first match was played between Al-Seeb Club and Al-Khaboora SC on 30 September 2004. 8 teams advanced to the Quarterfinals.

30 September 2004	Al-Seeb	0 – 0 (7 - 8 p)	Al-Khaboora

30 September 2004	Sur	1 – 0	Al-Nahda

30 September 2004	Al-Tali'aa	2 – 0	Al-Musannah

30 September 2004	Al-Oruba	4 – 1	Saham

30 September 2004	Al-Nasr	4 – 1	Nizwa

1 October 2004	Dhofar	2 – 1	Al-Ittihad

1 October 2004	Oman	2 – 3	Al-Suwaiq

1 October 2004	Muscat	2 – 1	Sohar

== Quarterfinals ==
8 teams played a knockout tie. 4 ties were played over two legs. The first match was played between Sur SC and Al-Suwaiq Club on 17 October 2004. Sur SC, Dhofar S.C.S.C., Al-Nasr S.C.S.C. and Muscat Club qualified for the Semifinals.

=== 1st Legs ===
17 October 2004	Sur	1 – 0	Al-Suwaiq
21:00 UTC+4

18 October 2004	Dhofar	2 – 2	Al-Oruba
21:00 UTC+4

18 October 2004	Al-Tali'aa	1 – 0	Al-Nasr
21:00 UTC+4

18 October 2004	Muscat	1 – 1	Al-Khaboora
21:00 UTC+4

=== 2nd Legs ===
22 October 2004	Al-Suwaiq	1 – 3	Sur
21:00 UTC+4

22 October 2004	Al-Nasr	3 - 1	Al-Tali'aa
21:00 UTC+4

22 October 2004	Al-Khaboora	1 - 3	Muscat
21:00 UTC+4

22 October 2004	Al-Oruba	1 – 2	Dhofar
21:00 UTC+4

== Semifinals ==
4 teams played a knockout tie. 2 ties were played over two legs. The first match was played between Muscat Club and Sur SC on 1 November 2004. Dhofar S.C.S.C. and Muscat Club qualified for the Finals.

=== 1st Legs ===
1 November 2004	Muscat	2 – 0	Sur
21:30 UTC+4

2 November 2004	Dhofar	2 – 2	Al-Nasr
21:30 UTC+4

=== 2nd Legs ===
5 November 2004	Al-Nasr	0 – 1	Dhofar
21:30 UTC+4

6 November 2004	Sur	1 – 1	Muscat
21:30 UTC+4

== Third Place ==
21 November 2004	Al-Nasr	0 – 1	Sur
21:30 UTC+4

== Finals ==
23 November 2004	Dhofar	1 – 0	Muscat
	Al-Dhabit 45', 73'
