= 2002–03 Omani League =

Omani League
- Season: 2002–03
- Champions: Ruwi
- Relegated: Nizwa; Sidab; Al-Salam; Al-Ahli
- AFC Cup: Dhofar
- Matches: 182
- Goals: 553 (3.04 per match)

The 2002–03 Omani League was the 27th edition of the top football league in Oman. Al-Oruba SC was the defending champions, having won the 2001–02 Omani League season. Ruwi emerged as the champions of the 2002–03 Omani League with a total of 65 points.

== Teams ==
This season the number of teams in the league had increased from 10 to 14. There was no relegation in the 2001–02 season. Second Division League teams Ruwi Club, Saham SC, Al-Salam SC and Nizwa Club were promoted to the league this season.

=== Stadia and locations ===
Club	Home city	Stadium	Capacity
Al-Khaboura	Al-Khaboura	Sohar Regional Sports Complex	19,000
Al-Nasr	Salalah	Al-Saada Stadium / Salalah Sports Complex	12,000 / 8,000
Al-Oruba	Sur	Sur Sports Complex	8,000
Al-Seeb	Seeb	Seeb Stadium	14,000
Al-Ahli	Sidab	Sultan Qaboos Sports Complex	39,000
Sidab	Sidab	Sultan Qaboos Sports Complex	39,000
Al-Suwaiq	Al-Suwaiq	Sohar Regional Sports Complex	19,000
Nizwa	Nizwa	Nizwa Sports Complex	10,000
Dhofar	Salalah	Al-Saada Stadium / Salalah Sports Complex	12,000 / 8,000
Ruwi	Muscat	Sultan Qaboos Sports Complex / Royal Oman Police Stadium	39,000 / 18,000
Oman	Muscat	Sultan Qaboos Sports Complex / Royal Oman Police Stadium	39,000 / 18,000
Al-Salam	Muscat	Sultan Qaboos Sports Complex / Royal Oman Police Stadium	39,000 / 18,000
Saham	Saham	Sohar Regional Sports Complex	19,000
Sur	Sur	Sur Sports Complex	8,000

== League table ==
Pos	Team	Pld	W	D	L	GF	GA	GD	Pts	Qualification or relegation
1	Ruwi (C)	26	21	2	3	59	17	+42	65	
2	Dhofar	26	20	3	3	52	15	+37	63	2004 AFC Cup group stage
3	Al-Nasr	26	17	4	5	53	28	+25	55	
4	Saham	26	13	3	10	39	36	+3	42	
5	Al-Oruba	26	9	9	8	47	38	+9	36	
6	Al-Khaboura	26	11	3	12	31	33	−2	36	
7	Al-Suwaiq	26	11	2	13	28	38	−10	35	
8	Al-Seeb	26	9	7	10	33	31	+2	34	
9	Oman	26	9	6	11	41	35	+6	33	
10	Sur	26	9	3	14	30	37	−7	30	Relegation Playoff
11	Nizwa (Note: Nizwa was formed after merge of Nizwa and Barkat Al-Muz and Al-Salam was formed after merge of Shinas and Liwa) (R)	26	8	4	14	47	53	−6	28	Relegation to 2004–05 Oman First Division League
12	Sidab (R)	26	7	2	17	38	55	−17	23	Relegation to 2004–05 Oman First Division League
13	Al-Salam (R)	26	5	6	15	33	77	−44	21	Relegation to 2004–05 Oman First Division League
14	Al-Ahli (R)	26	4	4	18	22	60	−38	16	Relegation to 2004–05 Oman First Division League

Source: RSSSF
Rules for classification: 1) points; 2) goal difference; 3) number of goals scored.
(C) Champions; (R) Relegated
