= 1998–99 Omani League =

Omani League
- Season: 1998–99
- Champions: Dhofar
- Relegated: Oman; Al-Ittihad
- Matches: 90
- Goals: 224 (2.49 per match)

The 1998–99 Omani League was the 23rd edition of the top football league in Oman. Al-Nasr S.C.S.C. were the defending champions, having won the 1997–98 Omani League season. Dhofar S.C.S.C. emerged as the champions of the 1998–99 Omani League with a total of 34 points.

== Teams ==
This season the league had ten teams. Quriyat Club and Buraimi SC were relegated to the Second Division League after finishing in the relegation zone in the 1997–98 season. The two relegated teams were replaced by Second Division League teams Al-Suwaiq Club and Fanja SC.

=== Stadia and locations ===
Club	Home city	Stadium	Capacity
Al-Ittihad	Salalah	Al-Saada Stadium / Salalah Sports Complex	12,000 / 8,000
Al-Nasr	Salalah	Al-Saada Stadium / Salalah Sports Complex	12,000 / 8,000
Al-Oruba	Sur	Sur Sports Complex	8,000
Al-Seeb	Seeb	Seeb Stadium	14,000
Al-Suwaiq	Al-Suwaiq	Sohar Regional Sports Complex	19,000
Dhofar	Salalah	Al-Saada Stadium / Salalah Sports Complex	12,000 / 8,000
Fanja	Fanja	Seeb Stadium	14,000
Oman	Muscat	Sultan Qaboos Sports Complex / Royal Oman Police Stadium	39,000 / 18,000
Sohar	Sohar	Sohar Regional Sports Complex	19,000
Sur	Sur	Sur Sports Complex	8,000

== League table ==
Pos	Team	Pld	W	D	L	GF	GA	GD	Pts	Relegation
1	Dhofar (C)	18	10	4	4	29	21	+8	34	
2	Al-Nasr	18	6	9	3	29	23	+6	27	
3	Al-Suwaiq	18	7	6	5	25	23	+2	27	
4	Fanja	18	7	4	7	25	21	+4	25	
5	Sur	18	4	11	3	17	14	+3	23	
6	Sohar	18	6	4	8	23	24	−1	22	
7	Al-Oruba	18	5	7	6	19	20	−1	22	
8	Al-Seeb	18	6	3	9	22	27	−5	21	
9	Oman (R)	18	5	5	8	14	22	−8	20	Relegation to 1999–2000 Oman First Division League
10	Al-Ittihad (R)	18	4	7	7	21	29	−8	19	Relegation to 1999–2000 Oman First Division League

Source: RSSSF
Rules for classification: 1) points; 2) goal difference; 3) number of goals scored.
(C) Champions; (R) Relegated
