= 1997–98 Omani League =

Omani League
- Season: 1997–98
- Champions: Al-Nasr
- Relegated: Quriyat; Buraimi
- Matches: 80
- Goals: 249 (3.11 per match)

The 1997–98 Omani League was the 23rd edition of the top football league in Oman. Oman Club were the defending champions, having won the 1996–97 Omani League season. Al-Nasr S.C.S.C. emerged as the champions of the 1997–98 Omani League with a total of 38 points.

== Teams ==
This season the number of teams in the league had decreased from 12 to 10. Al-Suwaiq Club, Al-Bustan Club, Fanja SC and Ruwi Club were relegated to the Second Division League after finishing in the relegation zone in the 1996–97 season. The two relegated teams were replaced by Second Division League teams Quriyat Club and Buraimi SC.

=== Stadia and locations ===
Club	Home city	Stadium	Capacity
Al-Ittihad	Salalah	Al-Saada Stadium / Salalah Sports Complex	12,000 / 8,000
Al-Nasr	Salalah	Al-Saada Stadium / Salalah Sports Complex	12,000 / 8,000
Al-Oruba	Sur	Sur Sports Complex	8,000
Al-Seeb	Seeb	Seeb Stadium	14,000
Buraimi	Al-Buraimi	Nizwa Sports Complex	10,000
Dhofar	Salalah	Al-Saada Stadium / Salalah Sports Complex	12,000 / 8,000
Quriyat	Quriyat	Nizwa Sports Complex	10,000
Oman	Muscat	Sultan Qaboos Sports Complex / Royal Oman Police Stadium	39,000 / 18,000
Sohar	Sohar	Sohar Regional Sports Complex	19,000
Sur	Sur	Sur Sports Complex	8,000

== League table ==
Pos	Team	Pld	W	D	L	GF	GA	GD	Pts	Relegation
1	Al-Nasr (C)	16	12	2	2	31	12	+19	38	
2	Sur	16	8	4	4	30	21	+9	28	
3	Al-Oruba	16	9	6	1	25	20	+5	33	
4	Al-Seeb	16	7	5	4	25	15	+10	26	
5	Oman	16	8	2	6	28	26	+2	26	
6	Dhofar	16	7	4	5	27	26	+1	25	
7	Al-Ittihad	16	4	6	6	19	20	−1	18	
8	Sohar	16	3	9	4	25	27	−2	18	
9	Quriyat (R)	16	2	3	11	19	36	−17	9	Relegation to 1998–99 Oman First Division League
10	Buraimi (R)	16	2	1	13	20	44	−24	7	Relegation to 1998–99 Oman First Division League

Source: RSSSF
Rules for classification: 1) points; 2) goal difference; 3) number of goals scored.
(C) Champions; (R) Relegated
