= 2007–08 Omani League =

Omani League
- Season: 2007–08
- Champions: Al-Oruba
- Relegated: Al-Wahda; Oman; Bahla
- AFC Cup: Al-Oruba
- Matches: 132
- Goals: 305 (2.31 per match)
- Top goalscorer: (Brazil) Aoerson D'Costa (9 goals)
- Biggest home win: Al-Oruba 4-0 Al-Seeb (4 April 2008)
- Biggest away win: Al-Wahda 0-3 Al-Seeb (6 December 2007); Bahla 1-4 Dhofar (3 January 2008); Muscat 1-4 Al-Oruba (27 March 2008); Al-Tali'aa 1-4 Dhofar (24 April 2008)
- Highest scoring: Al-Seeb 5-2 Bahla (2 May 2008); Al-Nahda 3-4 Al-Wahda (8 May 2008); Sur 5-2 Muscat (9 May 2008); Oman 4-3 Bahla (14 March 2008)
- Longest winning run: (4 games); Al-Khaboura
- Longest unbeaten run: (13 games); Al-Oruba
- Longest losing run: (8 games); Bahla

The 2007–08 Omani League was the 32nd edition of Oman's top football league. It began on 7 November 2007 and finished on 9 May 2008. Al-Nahda Club were the defending champions, having won the 2006–07 Omani League season. Al-Oruba SC won 4–2 away in their final league match against Oman Club and emerged as the champions of the 2007–08 Omani League with a total of 45 points.

== Teams ==
This season the league had 12 teams. Mjees SC and Al-Salam SC were relegated to the Second Division League after finishing in the relegation zone in the 2006-07 season. The two relegated teams were replaced by Second Division League teams Oman Club and Al-Wahda SC.

=== Stadia and locations ===
Club	Home city	Stadium	Capacity
Al-Khaboura	Al-Khaboura	Sohar Regional Sports Complex	19,000
Al-Nahda	Al-Buraimi	Nizwa Sports Complex	10,000
Al-Nasr	Salalah	Al-Saada Stadium / Salalah Sports Complex	12,000 / 8,000
Al-Oruba	Sur	Sur Sports Complex	8,000
Al-Seeb	Seeb	Seeb Stadium	14,000
Bahla	Bahla	Seeb Stadium	14,000
Al-Tali'aa	Sur	Sur Sports Complex	8,000
Dhofar	Salalah	Al-Saada Stadium / Salalah Sports Complex	12,000 / 8,000
Muscat	Muscat	Sultan Qaboos Sports Complex / Royal Oman Police Stadium	39,000 / 18,000
Oman	Muscat	Sultan Qaboos Sports Complex / Royal Oman Police Stadium	39,000 / 18,000
Al-Wahda	Sur	Sur Sports Complex	8,000
Sur	Sur	Sur Sports Complex	8,000

== League table ==
Pos	Team	Pld	W	D	L	GF	GA	GD	Pts	Qualification or relegation
1	Al-Oruba (C)	22	13	6	3	36	16	+20	45	2009 AFC Cup group stage
2	Dhofar	22	10	8	4	32	16	+16	38	
3	Al-Khaboura	22	9	7	6	29	2	+27	34	
4	Al-Seeb	22	8	9	5	25	20	+5	33	
5	Al-Nasr	22	8	9	5	19	19	0	33	2007 Gulf Club Champions Cup Group stage
6	Sur	22	7	10	5	28	23	+5	31	
7	Al-Nahda	22	7	7	8	20	20	0	28	
8	Muscat	22	7	6	9	18	27	−9	27	2007 Gulf Club Champions Cup Group stage
9	Al Tali'aa	22	7	5	10	23	26	−3	26	
10	Al-Wahda (R)	22	6	7	9	25	34	−9	25	Relegation Playoff
11	Oman (R)	22	5	6	11	27	39	−12	21	Relegation to 2008–09 Oman First Division League
12	Bahla (R)	22	3	4	15	23	45	−22	13	Relegation to 2008–09 Oman First Division League

Updated to match(es) played on 9 May 2008. Source:
Rules for classification: 1) points; 2) goal difference; 3) number of goals scored.
(C) Champions; (R) Relegated

== Results ==
Home \ Away	ALK	ALNH	ALN	ALO	ALS	BAH	ALT	DHO	MCT	OMA	WAH	SUR
Al-Khaboura		0–0	1–1	1–2	0–0	3–1	1–0	2–1	2–0	3–0	1–1	2–2
Al-Nahda	1–0		0–2	2–0	1–1	0–0	0–0	0–1	2–0	1–0	3–4	1–1
Al-Nasr	0–2	2–1		0–1	0–2	2–2	2–1	1–1	0–0	0–0	2–2	1–0
Al-Oruba	1–1	4–1	0–1		4–0	0–1	1–1	4–1	2–0	4–2	1–0	0–0
Al-Seeb	1–1	0–1	0–0	0–1		5–2	1–0	2–0	0–0	2–0	1–1	1–1
Bahla	0–2	0–2	0–1	0–1	2–2		1–1	1–4	0–2	3–1	2–3	1–2
Al-Tali'aa	1–0	0–2	0–0	0–1	2–1	4–1		1–4	0–1	0–2	1–0	2–2
Dhofar	0–1	0–0	1–1	2–2	3–0	2–0	2–1		0–1	3–0	3–0	2–0
Muscat	2–1	1–0	0–1	1–4	0–1	1–0	1–3	0–0		1–1	1–2	1–1
Oman	1–2	2–1	4–1	2–4	1–1	4–3	3–2	1–3	0–1		0–0	2–4
Al-Wahda	3–2	2–1	0–1	0–2	0–3	1–0	0–2	1–3	2–2	1–1		1–1
Sur	2–1	0–0	1–0	0–0	0–1	2–3	0–1	0–0	5–2	2–0	2–1	

Updated to match(es) played on 9 May 2008. Source:
Legend: Blue = home team win; Yellow = draw; Red = away team win.

== Season statistics ==
As of 9 May 2008

=== Top scorers ===
Rank	Scorer	Club	Goals
1	(Brazil) Aoerson D'Costa	Al-Oruba	9
2	(Oman) Hani Al-Dhabit	Dhofar	8
3	(Oman) Hussain Al-Hadhri	Dhofar	6
4	(Oman) Adel	Muscat	5
4	(Brazil) Marsiel	Al-Khaboura	5
6	(Oman) Haitham Masaoud	Al-Oruba	4
6	(Oman) Mohammed Taqi Al-Lawati	Muscat	4
6	(Oman) Issa Al-Balushi	Al-Seeb	4
6	(Oman) Osama Hadid	Al-Tali'aa	4
6	(Oman) Mohammed Al-Taib	Al-Khaboura	4

== Media coverage ==
Oman Mobile League Media Coverage
Country	Television Channel	Matches
Oman	Oman TV2	3 Matches per round

== See also ==
- 2007 Sultan Qaboos Cup
