= 2000–01 Omani League =

Omani League
- Season: 2000–01
- Champions: Dhofar
- Relegated: Ruwi; Bawshar
- Matches: 90
- Goals: 231 (2.57 per match)

The 2000–01 Omani League was the 25th edition of the top football league in Oman. As many as 231 goals were scored in the 90 matches played in this edition of the league. Al-Oruba SC were defending the title they had won in the 1999–00 Omani League season. Dhofar S.C.S.C. emerged as the champions of the 2000–01 Omani League with a total of 41 points.

== Teams ==
This season the league had 10 teams. Sohar SC and Fanja SC were relegated to the Second Division League after finishing in the relegation zone in the 1999-00 season. The two relegated teams were replaced by Second Division League teams Oman Club and Al-Ahli Club.

=== Stadia and locations ===
Club	Home city	Stadium	Capacity
Al-Nasr	Salalah	Al-Saada Stadium / Salalah Sports Complex	12,000 / 8,000
Al-Oruba	Sur	Sur Sports Complex	8,000
Al-Seeb	Seeb	Seeb Stadium	14,000
Al-Ahli	Sidab	Sultan Qaboos Sports Complex	39,000
Al-Suwaiq	Al-Suwaiq	Sohar Regional Sports Complex	19,000
Dhofar	Salalah	Al-Saada Stadium / Salalah Sports Complex	12,000 / 8,000
Ruwi	Muscat	Sultan Qaboos Sports Complex / Royal Oman Police Stadium	39,000 / 18,000
Bawshar	Bawshar	Sultan Qaboos Sports Complex / Royal Oman Police Stadium	39,000 / 18,000
Oman	Muscat	Sultan Qaboos Sports Complex / Royal Oman Police Stadium	39,000 / 18,000
Sur	Sur	Sur Sports Complex	8,000

== League table ==
Pos	Team	Pld	W	D	L	GF	GA	GD	Pts	Relegation
1	Dhofar (C)	18	12	5	1	33	13	+20	41	
2	Al-Oruba	18	11	3	4	32	15	+17	36	
3	Al-Seeb	18	10	6	2	28	17	+11	36	
4	Al-Nasr	18	9	4	5	33	18	+15	31	
5	Al-Ahli	18	5	7	6	23	22	+1	22	
6	Sur	18	5	7	6	17	21	−4	22	
7	Al-Suwaiq	18	6	4	8	20	25	−5	22	
8	Oman	18	4	5	9	25	28	−3	17	
9	Ruwi (R)	18	2	7	9	10	30	−20	13	Relegation to 2001–02 Oman First Division League
10	Bawshar (R)	18	1	2	15	10	42	−32	5	Relegation to 2001–02 Oman First Division League

Source: RSSSF
Rules for classification: 1) points; 2) goal difference; 3) number of goals scored.
(C) Champions; (R) Relegated
