= 1983–84 Omani League =

Omani League
- Season: 1983–84
- Champions: Fanja
- Relegated: Sur; Al-Tali'aa

The 1983–84 Omani League was the 10th edition of the top football league in Oman. Dhofar S.C.S.C. were the defending champions, having won the 1982–83 Omani League season. Fanja SC emerged as the champions of the 1983–84 Omani League.

== Teams ==
This season the league had 14 teams.

=== Stadia and locations ===
| Club | Home city | Stadium | Capacity |
|---|---|---|---|
| Al-Masam | Muscat | Sultan Qaboos Sports Complex / Royal Oman Police Stadium | 39,000 / 18,000 |
| Al-Nasr | Salalah | Al-Saada Stadium / Salalah Sports Complex | 12,000 / 8,000 |
| Al-Ahli | Sidab | Sultan Qaboos Sports Complex | 39,000 |
| Sidab | Sidab | Sultan Qaboos Sports Complex | 39,000 |
| Al-Tali'aa | Sur | Sur Sports Complex | 8,000 |
| Dhofar | Salalah | Al-Saada Stadium / Salalah Sports Complex | 12,000 / 8,000 |
| Fanja | Fanja | Seeb Stadium | 14,000 |
| Oman | Muscat | Sultan Qaboos Sports Complex / Royal Oman Police Stadium | 39,000 / 18,000 |
| Ruwi | Muscat | Sultan Qaboos Sports Complex / Royal Oman Police Stadium | 39,000 / 18,000 |
| Muttrah | Muscat | Sultan Qaboos Sports Complex / Royal Oman Police Stadium | 39,000 / 18,000 |
| Al-Adjaia | Muscat | Sultan Qaboos Sports Complex / Royal Oman Police Stadium | 39,000 / 18,000 |
| Sur | Sur | Sur Sports Complex | 8,000 |

== League table ==
| Pos | Team | Pld | W | D | L | GF | GA | GD | Pts | Relegation |
|---|---|---|---|---|---|---|---|---|---|---|
| 1 | Fanja (C) | 0 | 0 | 0 | 0 | 0 | 0 | 0 | 0 | |
| 2 | Al-Ahli | 0 | 0 | 0 | 0 | 0 | 0 | 0 | 0 | |
| 3 | Oman | 0 | 0 | 0 | 0 | 0 | 0 | 0 | 0 | |
| 4 | Ruwi | 0 | 0 | 0 | 0 | 0 | 0 | 0 | 0 | |
| 5 | Dhofar | 0 | 0 | 0 | 0 | 0 | 0 | 0 | 0 | |
| 6 | Al-Adjaia | 0 | 0 | 0 | 0 | 0 | 0 | 0 | 0 | |
| 7 | Al-Nasr | 0 | 0 | 0 | 0 | 0 | 0 | 0 | 0 | |
| 8 | Sidab | 0 | 0 | 0 | 0 | 0 | 0 | 0 | 0 | |
| 9 | Al-Masam | 0 | 0 | 0 | 0 | 0 | 0 | 0 | 0 | |
| 10 | Muttrah | 0 | 0 | 0 | 0 | 0 | 0 | 0 | 0 | |
| 11 | Sur (R) | 0 | 0 | 0 | 0 | 0 | 0 | 0 | 0 | Relegation to 1984–85 Oman First Division League |
| 12 | Al-Tali'aa (R) | 0 | 0 | 0 | 0 | 0 | 0 | 0 | 0 | Relegation to 1984–85 Oman First Division League |

Rules for classification: 1) points; 2) goal difference; 3) number of goals scored.
(C) Champions; (R) Relegated
