= 2001–02 Omani League =

Omani League
- Season: 2001–02
- Champions: Al-Oruba
- Matches: 55
- Goals: 135 (2.45 per match)

The 2001–02 Omani League was the 26th edition of the top football league in Oman. Dhofar S.C.S.C. were the defending champions, having won the 2000–01 Omani League season. Al-Oruba SC emerged as the champions of the 2001–02 Omani League with a total of 22 points.

== Teams ==
This season the league featured 10 teams. Ruwi Club and Bawshar Club were relegated to the Second Division League after finishing in the relegation zone in the 2000–01 season. The two relegated teams were replaced by Second Division League teams Sidab Club and Al-Khaboura SC.

=== Stadia and locations ===
Club	Home city	Stadium	Capacity
Al-Khaboura	Al-Khaboura	Sohar Regional Sports Complex	19,000
Al-Nasr	Salalah	Al-Saada Stadium / Salalah Sports Complex	12,000 / 8,000
Al-Oruba	Sur	Sur Sports Complex	8,000
Al-Seeb	Seeb	Seeb Stadium	14,000
Al-Ahli	Sidab	Sultan Qaboos Sports Complex	39,000
Sidab	Sidab	Sultan Qaboos Sports Complex	39,000
Al-Suwaiq	Al-Suwaiq	Sohar Regional Sports Complex	19,000
Dhofar	Salalah	Al-Saada Stadium / Salalah Sports Complex	12,000 / 8,000
Oman	Muscat	Sultan Qaboos Sports Complex / Royal Oman Police Stadium	39,000 / 18,000
Sur	Sur	Sur Sports Complex	8,000

== League table ==
Pos	Team	Pld	W	D	L	GF	GA	GD	Pts
1	Al-Oruba (C)	11	7	1	3	17	8	+9	22
2	Sur	11	4	6	1	14	11	+3	18
3	Al-Suwaiq	11	5	3	3	15	13	+2	18
4	Al-Seeb	10	4	5	1	14	11	+3	17
5	Sidab	11	4	4	3	18	14	+4	16
6	Dhofar	11	3	6	2	23	16	+7	15
7	Al-Nasr	11	2	5	4	6	9	−3	11
8	Al-Ahli	11	1	7	3	11	17	−6	10
9	Al-Khaboura	10	1	5	4	8	17	−9	8
10	Oman	11	1	2	8	9	19	−10	5

Source: RSSSF
Rules for classification: 1) points; 2) goal difference; 3) number of goals scored.
(C) Champions

Note: There was no relegation this season.
