= 1999–2000 Omani League =

Omani League
- Season: 1999–2000
- Champions: Al-Oruba
- Relegated: Sohar; Fanja
- Matches: 90
- Goals: 249 (2.77 per match)

The 1999–2000 Omani League was the 24th edition of the top football league in Oman. Dhofar S.C.S.C. were defending their title, having won the 1998–99 Omani League season. Al-Oruba SC emerged as the champions of the 1999–2000 Omani League with a total of 42 points.

== Teams ==
This season the league had 10 teams. Oman Club and Al-Ittihad Club were relegated to the Second Division League after finishing in the relegation zone in the 1998–99 season. The relegated teams were replaced by Second Division League teams Ruwi Club and Bawshar Club.

=== Stadia and locations ===
Club	Home city	Stadium	Capacity
Al-Nasr	Salalah	Al-Saada Stadium / Salalah Sports Complex	12,000 / 8,000
Al-Oruba	Sur	Sur Sports Complex	8,000
Al-Seeb	Seeb	Seeb Stadium	14,000
Al-Suwaiq	Al-Suwaiq	Sohar Regional Sports Complex	19,000
Dhofar	Salalah	Al-Saada Stadium / Salalah Sports Complex	12,000 / 8,000
Fanja	Fanja	Seeb Stadium	14,000
Ruwi	Muscat	Sultan Qaboos Sports Complex / Royal Oman Police Stadium	39,000 / 18,000
Bawshar	Bawshar	Sultan Qaboos Sports Complex / Royal Oman Police Stadium	39,000 / 18,000
Sohar	Sohar	Sohar Regional Sports Complex	19,000
Sur	Sur	Sur Sports Complex	8,000

== League table ==
Pos	Team	Pld	W	D	L	GF	GA	GD	Pts	Relegation
1	Al-Oruba (C)	18	13	3	2	39	17	+22	42	
2	Al-Nasr	18	11	3	4	24	16	+8	36	
3	Al-Seeb	18	9	4	5	40	26	+14	31	
4	Al-Suwaiq	18	7	4	7	20	23	−3	25	
5	Ruwi	18	6	5	7	17	23	−6	23	
6	Dhofar	18	6	4	8	23	22	+1	22	
7	Bawshar	18	7	1	10	24	32	−8	22	
8	Sur	18	5	6	7	21	24	−3	21	
9	Sohar (R)	18	5	2	11	23	37	−14	17	Relegation to 2000–01 Oman First Division League
10	Fanja (R)	18	2	6	10	18	29	−11	12	Relegation to 2000–01 Oman First Division League

Source: RSSSF
Rules for classification: 1) points; 2) goal difference; 3) number of goals scored.
(C) Champions; (R) Relegated
