= 2003–04 Omani League =

Omani League
- Season: 2003–04
- Champions: Al-Nasr
- Relegated: Al-Suwaiq; Saham
- Matches played: 132
- Goals scored: 372 (2.82 per match)
- Biggest home win: Al-Nasr 8-2 Al-Suwaiq (7 November 2003); Muscat 6-0 Al-Tali'aa (11 December 2003)
- Biggest away win: Saham 0-5 Al-Oruba (8 April 2004)
- Highest scoring: Al-Nasr 8-2 Al-Suwaiq (7 November 2003)

The 2003–04 Omani League was the 28th edition of the top football league in Oman. It began on 6 November 2003 and finished on 27 May 2004. Ruwi Club were the defending champions, having won the 2002–03 Omani League season. On Thursday, 27 May 2004, Al-Nasr S.C.S.C. won 2–1 at home in their final league match against Al-Oruba SC and resulted as the champions of the 2003–04 Omani League with a total of 46 points.

== Teams ==
This season the number of teams in the league had decreased from 14 to 12. Nizwa Club, Sidab Club, Al-Salam SC and Al-Ahli Club were relegated to the Second Division League after finishing in the relegation zone in the 2002–03 season. The four relegated teams were replaced by Second Division League teams Al-Tali'aa SC and Al-Nahda Club.

=== Stadia and locations ===
Club	Home city	Stadium	Capacity
Al-Khaboura	Al-Khaboura	Sohar Regional Sports Complex	19,000
Al-Nahda	Al-Buraimi	Nizwa Sports Complex	10,000
Al-Nasr	Salalah	Al-Saada Stadium / Salalah Sports Complex	12,000 / 8,000
Al-Oruba	Sur	Sur Sports Complex	8,000
Al-Seeb	Seeb	Seeb Stadium	14,000
Al-Suwaiq	Al-Suwaiq	Sohar Regional Sports Complex	19,000
Al-Tali'aa	Sur	Sur Sports Complex	8,000
Dhofar	Salalah	Al-Saada Stadium / Salalah Sports Complex	12,000 / 8,000
Muscat	Muscat	Sultan Qaboos Sports Complex / Royal Oman Police Stadium	39,000 / 18,000
Oman	Muscat	Sultan Qaboos Sports Complex / Royal Oman Police Stadium	39,000 / 18,000
Saham	Saham	Sohar Regional Sports Complex	19,000
Sur	Sur	Sur Sports Complex	8,000

== League table ==
As of 27 May 2004

Pos	Team	Pld	W	D	L	GF	GA	GD	Pts	Qualification or relegation
1	Al-Nasr (C)	22	14	4	4	54	30	+24	46	
2	Muscat	22	15	4	3	51	18	+33	45 (Note: Muscat had 4 points deducted for twice fielding an ineligible player)	
3	Al-Oruba	22	12	5	5	37	21	+16	41	
4	Oman	22	9	5	8	25	20	+5	32	
5	Dhofar	22	9	5	8	22	25	−3	32	
6	Al-Tali'aa	22	9	4	9	29	33	−4	31	
7	Al-Seeb	22	6	8	8	24	24	0	26	
8	Al Nahda	22	6	8	8	26	29	−3	26	
9	Sur	22	5	10	7	27	32	−5	25	
10	Al-Khaboura	22	6	6	10	29	37	−8	24	Relegation Playoff
11	Al-Suwaiq (R)	22	4	6	12	31	58	−27	18	Relegation to 2004–05 Oman First Division League
12	Saham (R)	22	2	5	15	17	45	−28	11	Relegation to 2004–05 Oman First Division League

Updated to match(es) played on 27 May 2004. Source: League Table
Rules for classification: 1) points; 2) goal difference; 3) number of goals scored.
(C) Champions; (R) Relegated

== Results ==
As of 27 May 2004

Home \ Away	ALK	ALNH	ALN	ALO	ALS	ALSU	ALT	DHO	MCT	OMA	SAH	SUR
Al-Khaboura		1–2	2–3	2–0	1–3	0–0	1–1	1–2	0–1	2–1	2–2	1–1
Al-Nahda	2–1		2–3	0–0	1–1	2–0	0–0	0–0	1–2	0–0	2–4	2–0
Al-Nasr	3–0	3–1		2–1	3–0	8–2	0–3	2–1	1–1	1–2	4–0	0–3
Al-Oruba	4–0	0–0	3–4		1–0	1–1	3–1	0–1	1–0	2–1	1–0	1–0
Al-Seeb	4–1	1–1	0–0	1–1		3–0	1–2	1–0	1–3	0–0	1–1	0–1
Al-Suwaiq	4–3	1–3	0–4	1–2	2–1		3–4	2–3	1–1	0–2	3–2	1–1
Al-Tali'aa	0–1	2–0	2–3	2–4	1–1	1–1		0–1	0–1	2–1	1–0	2–0
Dhofar	0–1	2–1	1–1	0–1	2–0	2–1	1–2		2–2	0–0	2–1	1–1
Muscat	0–1	3–2	4–0	1–3	2–0	6–1	6–0	3–0		2–0	3–1	4–1
Oman	1–1	2–0	0–4	1–0	0–2	5–2	2–0	2–0	0–1		3–0	0–0
Saham	0–4	2–3	1–1	0–5	1–1	1–2	0–3	0–1	0–2	1–0		0–1
Sur	3–3	1–1	1–4	3–3	0–2	3–3	2–0	3–0	2–2	0–2	0–0	

Updated to match(es) played on unknown. Source: goalzz.com
Legend: Blue = home team win; Yellow = draw; Red = away team win.
