= 1985–86 Omani League =

Omani League
- Season: 1985–86
- Champions: Fanja
- Matches: 46
- Goals: 214 (4.65 per match)

The 1985–86 Omani League was the 12th edition of the top football league in Oman. Dhofar S.C.S.C. were the defending champions, having won the 1984–85 Omani League season. Fanja SC emerged as the 1985–86 Omani League champions with a total of five points in the Championship play-off round.

== Teams ==
This season the league had 10 teams.

=== Stadia and locations ===
Club	Home city	Stadium	Capacity
Al-Ittihad	Salalah	Al-Saada Stadium / Salalah Sports Complex	12,000 / 8,000
Al-Nasr	Salalah	Al-Saada Stadium / Salalah Sports Complex	12,000 / 8,000
Al-Oruba	Sur	Sur Sports Complex	8,000
Al-Ahli	Sidab	Sultan Qaboos Sports Complex	39,000
Sidab	Sidab	Sultan Qaboos Sports Complex	39,000
Dhofar	Salalah	Al-Saada Stadium / Salalah Sports Complex	12,000 / 8,000
Fanja	Fanja	Seeb Stadium	14,000
Oman	Muscat	Sultan Qaboos Sports Complex / Royal Oman Police Stadium	39,000 / 18,000
Al-Hilal	Salalah	Al-Saada Stadium	12,000
Sur	Sur	Sur Sports Complex	8,000

== First round ==
=== Group A ===
Pos	Team	Pld	W	D	L	GF	GA	GD	Pts
1	Fanja	8	5	2	1	12	7	+5	12
2	Al-Oruba	8	4	2	2	12	17	−5	10
3	Dhofar	8	4	0	4	25	12	+13	8
4	Al-Hilal	8	2	1	5	14	19	−5	5
5	Oman	8	2	1	5	12	20	−8	5

Source: RSSSF

=== Group B ===
Pos	Team	Pld	W	D	L	GF	GA	GD	Pts
1	Al-Nasr	8	5	2	1	19	2	+17	12
2	Al-Ittihad	8	5	2	1	16	4	+12	12
3	Al-Ahli	8	2	3	3	5	9	−4	7
4	Sur	8	2	2	4	7	16	−9	6
5	Sidab	8	1	1	6	4	20	−16	3

Source: RSSSF

=== Championship playoff ===
Pos	Team	Pld	W	D	L	GF	GA	GD	Pts
1	Fanja (C)	3	2	1	0	6	1	+5	5
2	Al-Ittihad	3	2	0	1	5	5	0	4
3	Al-Nasr	3	1	1	1	4	4	0	3
4	Al-Oruba	3	0	0	3	1	6	−5	0

Source: RSSSF
(C) Champions
