= 2024–25 Oman Professional League =

Oman Professional League
- Season: 2024–25
- Champions: Al Seeb
- AFC Champions League Two: Al Seeb
- AFC Challenge League: Al-Shabab
- AGCFF Gulf Club Champions League: Al-Nahda
- Matches: 89
- Goals: 186 (2.09 per match)
- Biggest home win: Al Nasr 4-2 Sohar (21 August 2024)
- Biggest away win: Saham 1-4 Al Seeb (25 September 2024)
- Longest winning run: Al Seeb (10 matches)
- Longest unbeaten run: Al Nahda (15 matches)
- Longest losing run: Sur (3 Matches)
- All statistics correct as of 25 February 2025.

The 2024–25 Oman Professional League is the 49th edition of the Oman Professional League, the top football league in Oman. The season started on 15 August 2024 and scheduled to conclude in May 2025.

== Teams ==
Locations of teams in the 2024–25 Oman Professional League

Team	Location	Stadium	Capacity
Al-Khaburah	Al-Khaburah	Sohar Regional Sports Complex	19,000
Al-Nahda	Al-Buraimi	Al-Buraimi Sports Stadium	17,000
Al-Nasr	Salalah	Al-Saada Stadium	8,000
Al-Rustaq	Rustaq	Rustaq Sports Complex	17,000
Al-Seeb	Seeb	Al-Seeb Stadium	14,000
Al-Shabab	Barka	Al-Seeb Stadium	14,000
Bahla	Bahla	Nizwa Sport Complex	10,000
Ibri	Ibri		
Oman	Muscat	Sultan Qaboos Sports Complex	34,000
Saham	Saham	Sohar Regional Sports Complex	19,000
Sohar	Sohar	Sohar Club Stadium	3,350
Sur	Sur	Sur Sports Complex	8,000

== League table ==
Pos	Team	Pld	W	D	L	GF	GA	GD	Pts	Qualification or relegation
1	Al-Seeb (C)	22	16	3	3	46	17	+29	51	Qualification for AFC Champions League Two qualifying play-offs
2	Al-Nahda	22	13	8	1	35	10	+25	47	Qualification for the AGCFF Gulf Club Champions League group stage
3	Oman	22	11	6	5	21	14	+7	39	
4	Al-Khaburah	22	9	4	9	22	27	−5	31	
5	Saham	22	8	5	9	28	35	−7	29	
6	Al-Shabab	22	8	4	10	33	29	+4	28	Qualification for the AFC Challenge League group stage (Note: Since the winners of the 2024–25 Sultan Qaboos Cup, Al-Shabab, have qualified for the AFC Challenge League.)
7	Bahla	22	8	4	10	24	23	+1	28	
8	Al-Nasr	22	8	4	10	23	28	−5	28	
9	Sohar	22	6	6	10	24	35	−11	24	
10	Al-Rustaq	22	6	5	11	17	26	−9	23	
11	Ibri	22	5	5	12	14	28	−14	20	
12	Sur (R)	22	4	6	12	12	27	−15	18	Relegation to Oman First Division League

Source: Soccerway
Rules for classification: 1) Points; 2) Goal difference; 3) Goals scored.
(C) Champions; (R) Relegated

== Results ==
Home \ Away	BAH	KHA	NAH	NAS	RUS	SEB	SHB	IBR	OMA	SAH	SOH	SUR
Bahla				0–1	2–1	1–2		0–1			0–0	3–0
Al-Khaburah			0–1	0–1	0–1	1–1	2–1		2–2			
Al-Nahda	2–0			1–0			1–0			2–2	6–0	
Al-Nasr	1–1				2–1				0–0	1–2	4–2	
Al-Rustaq	0–1		1–1					1–1	0–1	3–1		0–0
Al-Seeb		4–0						3–1	1–2		3–1	1–0
Al-Shabab					2–1	0–1		1–0		0–3	2–2	
Ibri			0–1	0–2					0–2	1–1		2–0
Oman		2–3		0–0			1–0			2–1	2–1	
Saham	1–1	1–0	0–2			1–4						1–0
Sohar			1–3		2–0			0–1		1–0		1–1
Sur		0–1	0–1	1–0			1–0	2–1	0–1			

Updated to match(es) played on 29 April 2025. Source: Soccerway
Legend: Blue = home team win; Yellow = draw; Red = away team win.

== Attendances ==
The average league attendance was 257:

#	Club	Average
1	Al-Seeb	403
2	Oman	397
3	Al-Shabab	279
4	Saham	276
5	Bahla	267
6	Al-Nasr	261
7	Sohar	234
8	Al-Rustaq	226
9	Ibri	196
10	Al-Nahda	183
11	Al-Khaburah	181
12	Sur	177
