= Mohammed Al-Hinai =

Omani footballer (born 1984)

Mohammed Al Hinai
Personal information
- Full name: Mohammed Mubarak Suwaid Al-Hinai
- Date of birth: 19 July 1984 (age 42)
- Place of birth: Muscat, Oman
- Height: 1.72 m (5 ft 8 in)
- Position: Attacking midfielder

Youth career
- 1996–1999: Oman

Senior career*
Years	Team	Apps	(Gls)
1999–2005	Oman	?	(?)
2005–2006	Al-Nasr	?	(3)
2006–2007	Al-Qadisiya	?	(5)
2007	Al-Nasr	?	(1)
2007–2008	→ Al-Sahel (Loan)	?	(3)
2008–2010	Al-Nasr	?	(4)
2010–2011	→ Al-Tadamon (Loan)	?	(5)
2011	Oman	?	(3)
2011–2016	Fanja		

International career
1999–2009	Oman	14	(5)
- * Club domestic league appearances and goals

Mohammed Mubarak Suwaid Al-Hinai (Arabic: محمد مبارك سويد الهنائي; born 19 July 1984), is an Omani footballer who plays for Fanja SC.

== Club career statistics ==
Club	Season	Division	League		Cup		Continental (Note: Includes appearances in the AFC Champions League and AFC Cup)		Other (Note: Includes goals in the GCC Champions League and Club Friendlies)		Total	
Club	Season	Division	Apps	Goals	Apps	Goals	Apps	Goals	Apps	Goals	Apps	Goals
Al-Nasr	2005–06	Omani League	-	3	-	4	-	3	-	0	-	10
Al-Nasr	Total		-	3	-	4	-	3	-	0	-	10
Al-Qadisiya	2006–07	Kuwaiti Premier League	-	5	-	7	-	1	-	2	-	15
Al-Qadisiya	Total		-	5	-	7	-	1	-	2	-	15
Al-Nasr	2007–08	Omani League	-	1	-	1	-	0	-	2	-	4
Al-Nasr	Total		-	1	-	1	-	0	-	2	-	4
Al-Sahel	2007–08	Kuwaiti Premier League	-	3	-	2	-	0	-	0	-	5
Al-Sahel	Total		-	3	-	2	-	0	-	0	-	5
Al-Nasr	2008–09	Omani League	-	1	-	3	-	0	-	0	-	4
Al-Nasr	2009–10	Omani League	-	3	-	0	-	0	-	0	-	3
Al-Nasr	Total		-	4	-	3	-	0	-	0	-	7
Al-Tadamon	2010–11	Kuwaiti Premier League	-	5	-	1	-	0	-	0	-	6
Al-Tadamon	Total		-	5	-	1	-	0	-	0	-	6
Oman	2010–11	Omani League	-	3	-	0	-	0	-	0	-	3
Oman	Total		-	3	-	0	-	0	-	0	-	3
Fanja	2011–12	Oman Professional League	-	7	-	0	-	0	-	0	-	7
Fanja	2012–13	Oman Professional League	-	6	-	0	7	3	-	0	-	9
Fanja	2013–14	Oman Professional League	-	3	-	1	5	0	-	0	-	4
Fanja	Total		-	16	-	1	12	3	-	0	-	20
Career total			-	40	-	19	-	7	-	4	-	70

== International career ==
Mohammed was selected for the national team for the first time in 1999. He has made appearances in the 16th Arabian Gulf Cup, the 17th Arabian Gulf Cup, the 2004 AFC Asian Cup qualification, the 2004 AFC Asian Cup, the 18th Arabian Gulf Cup and the 2007 AFC Asian Cup qualification.

He also played at the 2001 FIFA U-17 World Championship in Trinidad and Tobago and scored two goals, one in a 1–2 loss against Spain and another in a 1–1 draw against Burkina Faso

=== FIFA World Cup Qualification ===
Mohammed has made three appearances in the 2006 FIFA World Cup qualification and six in the 2010 FIFA World Cup qualification.

In the 2006 FIFA World Cup qualification, he scored a brace in the 2006 FIFA World Cup qualification – AFC second round in a 5–1 win over India.

In the 2010 FIFA World Cup qualification, he scored one goal in the 2010 FIFA World Cup qualification – AFC first round in a 2–0 win over Nepal.

== National team career statistics ==
List of international goals scored by Mohammed Al-Hinai
#	Date	Venue	Opponent	Score	Result	Competition
1	31 March 2004	Jawaharlal Nehru Stadium, Kochi, Kerala, India	India	2–1	5–1	2006 FIFA World Cup qualification
1	31 March 2004	Jawaharlal Nehru Stadium, Kochi, Kerala, India	India	3–1	5–1	2006 FIFA World Cup qualification
3	28 October 2007	Dasarath Rangasala Stadium, Kathmandu, Nepal	Nepal	2–0	2–0	2010 FIFA World Cup qualification

== Honours ==
=== Club ===
- Fanja

- Oman Professional League: 2011–12
- Sultan Qaboos Cup: 2013-14
- Oman Professional League Cup: 2014-15
- Oman Super Cup: 2012
