= Fanja =

Fanja may refer to:

- Fanja, a common female name in Madagascar
- Fanja, Oman, or Fanjah, a populated place in Oman
- Fanja, a football club
