= 2017–18 Oman Professional League =

- Season: 2017–18
- Champions: Al Suwaiq
- Relegated: Fanja, Al-Mudhaibi, Al-Salam
- Matches: 182
- Goals: 464 (2.55 per match)
- Top goalscorer: (Oman) Abdul Aziz Al-Muqbali (21 goals)

The 2017–18 Oman Professional League was the 42nd edition of the top football league in Oman.

== Foreign players ==
Restricting the number of foreign players strictly to four per team, including a slot for a player from AFC countries. A team could use four foreign players on the field during each game including at least one player from the AFC country.

Club	Player 1	Player 2	Player 3	AFC Player	GCC Player	Former Players
Al-Nahda	(Bosnia and Herzegovina) Nikola Totic	(Croatia) Filip Fumić	(Ghana) Ibrahim Basit		(Kuwait) Yousef Nasser	
Al-Nasr	(Egypt) Fady Farid	(Nigeria) Daniel Etor				
Al-Oruba	(Ivory Coast) Zoumana Koné	(Ghana) Joseph Adjei				
Al-Salam	(Brazil) Jaja	(Uzbekistan) Alisher Azizov				
Al-Shabab	(Brazil) Fernando Evangelista dos Santos					(Brazil) Vinícius Calamari
Al-Suwaiq	(Netherlands) Leandro Resida	(Nigeria) Bassey Inyang Howells	(Senegal) Abdoulaye Dieng			
Dhofar	(Brazil) Vinícius Calamari	(Spain) Hugo López	(Syria) Tamer Haj Mohamad	(Syria) Amro Jenyat		
Fanja	(Tanzania) Mrisho Ngasa	(Tanzania) Daniel Lyanga				
Mirbat	(Brazil) Júnior	(Morocco) Noah Sadaoui				
Muscat	(Brazil) Emanuel Blanc					
Oman	(Brazil) Arthur Felix Da Silva	(France) Philtzgérald Mbaka				
Saham	(Egypt) Afroto	(Lebanon) Feiz Shamsin	(Iran) Amir Arsalan Motahari			
Sohar	(Romania) Alin Stoica					

== League table ==
Pos	Team	Pld	W	D	L	GF	GA	GD	Pts	Qualification or relegation
1	Al-Suwaiq	26	20	3	3	50	25	+25	63	Qualification to 2019 AFC Cup group stage
2	Al-Shabab	26	12	6	8	32	30	+2	42	Qualification to 2019 GCC Champions League
3	Al-Nahda	26	9	10	7	41	34	+7	37	
4	Al-Nasr	26	9	8	9	28	26	+2	35	
5	Al-Orouba	26	9	7	10	22	26	−4	34	
6	Dhofar	26	9	6	11	34	31	+3	33	
7	Saham	26	8	9	9	36	35	+1	33	
8	Sohar	26	9	6	11	37	42	−5	33	
9	Muscat	26	8	9	9	34	39	−5	33	
10	Mirbat	26	10	2	14	35	47	−12	32	
11	Oman	26	6	13	7	31	27	+4	31	
12	Fanja	26	8	7	11	33	34	−1	31	Qualification to Relegation Playoff
13	Al-Mudhaibi	26	9	4	13	26	34	−8	31	Relegation to 2018–19 Oman First Division League
14	Al-Salam	26	8	6	12	25	34	−9	30	Relegation to 2018–19 Oman First Division League

Source: FIFA
Rules for classification: 1) Points; 2) Goal difference; 3) Number of goals scored;
