= 2020–21 Oman Professional League =

Oman Professional League
- Season: 2020–21
- Champions: [No Champion]

The 2020–21 Oman Professional League was the 45th edition of the Oman Professional League, the top football league in Oman. The season was cancelled after 10 matches due COVID-19 pandemic.

== Team ==
Locations of teams in the 2019-20 Oman Professional League
