= 1994–95 Omani League =

Omani League
- Season: 1994–95
- Champions: Sur
- Matches played: 183

The 1994–95 Omani League was the 21st edition of the top football league in Oman. Dhofar S.C.S.C. were the defending champions, having won the 1993–94 Omani League season. Sur SC emerged as the champions of the 1994–95 Omani League with a total of 58 points.

== Stadia and locations ==
Club	Home city	Stadium	Capacity
Al-Seeb	Seeb	Seeb Stadium	14,000
Sur	Sur	Sur Sports Complex	8,000

== League table ==
Pos.	Team		Pts
1	Sur	26	58
2	Al-Seeb	26	58

== Championship play-off ==
Sur	2 - 1	Al-Seeb
Mohammed Khamis 82'; Yousef Saleh 87'		Hamood Khalfan 90'
