= Bosher =

Bosher or Boshers is a surname. Notable people with this name include:

- Carolyn Maloney (née Carolyn Jane Bosher, born 1946), politician
- Matt Bosher (born 1987), American football player
- Kate Langley Bosher (1865–1932), American novelist
- Buddy Boshers (born 1988), American baseball pitcher

== See also ==
- Bosher Dam, in the James River near Richmond, Virginia
