= Oman Professional League =

Association football league in Oman

- Founded: 1976; 50 years ago
- Country: Oman
- Confederation: AFC
- Number of clubs: 14
- Level on pyramid: 1
- Relegation to: Oman First Division League
- Domestic cup(s): Sultan Qaboos Cup; Oman Super Cup
- League cup: Oman Professional League Cup
- International cup: AFC Challenge League
- Current champions: Al-Seeb (2025–26) (5th title)
- Most championships: Dhofar (12 titles)
- Broadcaster(s): Oman Sports TV
- Current: 2026–27 Oman Professional League

The Oman Professional League (Arabic: دوري المحترفين عمان; known as the Omantel Professional League for sponsorship reasons), previously known as the Omantel Elite League, is the top division of the Oman Football Association. It was founded in 1976. Currently, the most successful team in the league is Dhofar, with 12 titles to its name.

== Evolution to a professional league ==
In 2010, during the annual draw for the Sultan Qaboos Cup, Sultan Qaboos bin Said, the Sultan of Oman, granted the OFA an annual sum of 2.6 million rial (approximately 6.7 million dollars) until the year 2015 to further boost the development of the league. The move was made to nurture Oman's football youth, and create higher hopes of Oman qualifying for the 2014 FIFA World Cup. The deal is in addition to the annual 1.6 million rial that the Sultan gives to the OFA every year.

Although being very popular in the local community, it was ranked according to the AFC as a Class D football League till the 2012–13 season. Sayyid Khalid bin Hamid Al-Busaidi, OFA President, had already announced his organization's plan to transform the Omani Football League into a professional league by 2012, and also announced to change the league's name to the Oman Mobile League. The interest from many companies such as Nissan, Shell and Oman Mobile, was one of the main reasons why the league was expected to transform, under with the leadership of Sayyid Khalid.

The contract was extended again for the 2011–12 season for another three years to be known as the Omantel Elite League.

In 2013, ahead of the 2013–14 season, it was announced that the league had taken the first steps to becoming fully professional. The Oman Football League got the seal of approval as a professional league on 1 September 2013 and will henceforth be called the Omantel Professional League (OPL).

On 10 September 2014, one day before the first match of the 2014–15 season was played, Oman Football Association announced the extension of Omantel’s support for the country’s Professional League as its title sponsor.

On 30 April 2016, OFA and the Public Authority for Radio and Television (PART) reached an agreement on TV broadcasting rights of all competitions and matches organised by OFA including those related to OPL and any other competitions and matches for three seasons.

On 5 September 2016, the leading healthcare services provider in the Sultanate, Badr Al Samaa Group of Hospitals renewed their partnership with OFA for the 2016-17 Omani football season. On 8 September 2016, OFA confirmed that Omantel will be renewing their contract as the title sponsors of the OPL for the following three years, starting with the 2016-17 season until the 2018-19 season.

== Oman Professional League clubs (2024–25) ==
- Al-Seeb Club
- Al-Nahda Club
- Al-Nasr S.C.S.C.
- Oman Club
- Al-Rustaq SC
- Al-Shabab Club
- Ibri Club
- Dhofar S.C.S.C.
- Saham Club
- Sur SC
- Al-Khaburah SC
- Sohar SC

=== Relegated in 2023-24 ===
- Al-Wahda SC
- Bahla Club

== Championship history ==
As of 26 May 2024

=== Year by year ===
Season	Champion	Runner up
1976–77	Fanja (1)	
1977–78	Ruwi (1)	
1978–79	Fanja (2)	
1979–80	Al-Nasr (1)	
1980–81	Al-Nasr (2)	
1981–82	Al-Ahli (1)	
1982–83	Dhofar (1)	Al-Nasr
1983–84	Fanja (3)	Al-Ahli
1984–85	Dhofar (2)	Al-Nasr
1985–86	Fanja (4)	Al-Ittihad
1986–87	Fanja (5)	
1987–88	Fanja (6)	Dhofar
1988–89	Al-Nasr (3)	
1989–90	Dhofar (3)	Al-Nasr
1990–91	Fanja (7)	
1991–92	Dhofar (4)	Al-Oruba
1992–93	Dhofar (5)	
1993–94	Dhofar (6)	
1994–95	Sur (1)	Al-Seeb
1995–96	Sur (2)	Oman
1996–97	Oman (1)	Sur
1997–98	Al-Nasr (4)	Sur
1998–99	Dhofar (7)	Al-Nasr
1999–00	Al-Oruba (1)	Al-Nasr
2000–01	Dhofar (8)	Al-Oruba
2001–02	Al-Oruba (2)	Sur
2002–03	Muscat (2)	Dhofar
2003–04	Al-Nasr (5)	Muscat
2004–05	Dhofar (9)	Al-Oruba
2005–06	Muscat (3)	Al-Nahda
2006–07	Al-Nahda (1)	Al-Oruba
2007–08	Al-Oruba (3)	Dhofar
2008–09	Al-Nahda (2)	Muscat
2009–10	Al-Suwaiq (1)	Dhofar
2010–11	Al-Suwaiq (2)	Al-Oruba
2011–12	Fanja (8)	Al-Shabab
2012–13	Al-Suwaiq (3)	Fanja
2013–14^{*}	Al-Nahda (3)	Fanja
2014–15	Al-Oruba (4)	Fanja
2015–16	Fanja (9)	Al-Suwaiq
2016–17	Dhofar (10)	Al-Shabab
2017–18	Al-Suwaiq (4)	Al-Shabab
2018–19	Dhofar (11)	Al-Shabab
2019–20	Al-Seeb (1)	Dhofar
2020–21	Dhofar (12)	Al-Seeb
2021–22	Al-Seeb (2)	Al Nahda
2022–23	Al-Nahda (4)	Al-Suwaiq
2023–24	Al-Seeb (3)	Al Nahda
2024–25	Al-Seeb (4)	Al Nahda
2025–26	Al-Seeb (5)	Al-Shabab Barka

^{*}The Professional League began from the 2013–14 season

=== Cities ===
The following table lists the Oman Professional League champions by cities.

City	Titles	Winning clubs
Salalah	17	Dhofar (12), Al-Nasr (5)
Fanja	9	Fanja (9)
Sur	6	Al-Oruba (4), Sur (2)
Muscat	5	Muscat (3), Oman (1), Al-Ahli (1)
Seeb	5	Al-Seeb (5)
Al-Suwaiq	4	Al-Suwaiq (4)
Al-Buraimi	4	Al-Nahda (4)

=== Performance by club ===
Club	Winners	Runners-up	Winning seasons
Dhofar	12	5	1982–83, 1984–85, 1989–90, 1991–92, 1992–93, 1993–94, 1998–99, 2000–01, 2004–05, 2016–17, 2018–19, 2020–21
Fanja	9	3	1976–77, 1978–79, 1983–84, 1985–86, 1986–87, 1987–88, 1990–91, 2011–12, 2015–16
Al-Nasr	5	5	1979–80, 1980–81, 1988–89, 1997–98, 2003–04
Al-Seeb	5	2	2019–20, 2021–22, 2023–24, 2024–25, 2025–26
Al-Orouba	4	5	1999–00, 2001–02, 2007–08, 2014–15
Al-Nahda	4	4	2006–07, 2008–09, 2013–14, 2022–23
Al-Suwaiq	4	2	2009–10, 2010–11, 2012–13, 2017–18
Muscat^{*}	3	2	1977–78, 2002–03, 2005–06
Sur	2	3	1994–95, 1995–96
Ahli Sidab	1	1	1981–82
Oman	1	1	1996–97

^{*}Includes championships won by Ruwi.

== Topscorers ==
Season	Player	Club	Goals
1991–92	(Oman) Hilal Hamid	Dhofar	14
1995–96	(Oman) Hilal Hamid	Dhofar	20
1996–97	(Oman) Said Faraj	Dhofar	19
2004-05	(Oman) Ahmed Al Busafy	Al-Seeb	12
2005–06	(Oman) Salim Al-Shamsi (Oman) Ismail Al-Ajmi	Al Nahda; Muscat	12
2006–07	(Oman) Mohammed Abdullah	Al-Nasr	6
2007–08	(Brazil) Aoerson D'Costa	Al Oruba	9
2008–09	(Oman) Said Al-Ruzaiqi	Sur	13
2009–10	(Oman) Ibrahim Al-Gheilani	Al Suwaiq	11
2010–11	(Brazil) Rodrigo Felix de Oliveira	Al Nahda	12
2011–12	(Oman) Waleed Al-Saadi	Al Suwaiq	14
2012–13	(Senegal) Ely Cissé	Fanja	14
2013–14	(Ivory Coast) Jumaa Saeed (Oman) Mohammed Al-Ghassani	Al Nahda; Al Suwaiq	16
2014–15	(Ivory Coast) Mechac Koffi	Al-Nasr	19
2015–16	(Croatia) Vedran Gerc	Sohar	14
2016–17	(Oman) Essam Al-Barahi	Al-Rustaq	16
2017–18	(Oman) Abdul Aziz Al-Muqbali	Al Suwaiq	21
2018–19	(Oman) Mohammed Al-Ghassani	Saham	18

== Notable achievements by Omani clubs ==
The first trophy won by an Omani club in the regional or continental level was by Fanja in the 1989 Gulf Club Champions Cup, later named GCC Champions League. Fanja defeated Al-Muharraq of Bahrain in a penalty shootout after the match had ended 1–1 in the normal time. Fanja has appeared four times in the same tournament.

In the 1993–94 Asian Club Championship Omani club, Oman Club were awarded with second place after failing to beat Thai club, Thai Farmers Bank.

A few years later in 1996, Dhofar attempted to win the GCC Champions Cup, as Fanja did in 1989, but failed in the final match against Saudi club, Al-Nassr and finished with second place.

Al-Nahda competed in the 2008 AFC Cup, but were knocked-out in the semi-finals by eventual champions of the competition, Al-Muharraq on scoring aggregate.

Al Seeb Club achieved the AFC Cup title, becoming the second Omani club to achieve a regional or continental championship, after defeating Kuala Lumpur City in the 2022 AFC Cup Final.

== See also ==
- Sultan Qaboos Cup
- Oman Professional League Cup
- Oman Super Cup
