= Mirbat SC =

Omani sports club

Mirbat SC نادي مرباط الرياضي
- Full name: Mirbat Sports Club
- Founded: 1973
- Ground: Al-Saada Stadium; Salalah Sports Complex; Salalah, Oman
- Capacity: 12,000; 8,000
Home colours	Away colours

Mirbat Sports Club (Arabic: نادي مرباط الرياضي) is an Omani sports club based in Mirbat, Oman. Their home ground is Al-Saada Stadium. They also recognize the older Salalah Sports Complex as their home ground. Both stadiums are government owned. The club also owns its personal stadium and sports equipment, as well as its own training facilities.

== Being a multisport club ==
Although being mainly known for their football, Mirbat SC like many other clubs in Oman, have not only football in their list, but also hockey, volleyball, handball, basketball, badminton and squash. They also have a youth football team competing in the Omani Youth league.

== Colors, kit providers and sponsorships ==
Mirbat SC have been known since establishment to wear a full white (with red stripes) kit (usually a darker shade of red), varying themselves from neighbors Al-Nasr SC (Blue kit), Al-Ittihad (Green kit) and Dhofar (Red kit). They have also had many different sponsors over the years. As of now, Adidas provides them with kits.

== Club performance-International Competitions ==
=== AFC competitions ===
- Asian Club Championship : 1 appearance

- 1994–95 : Second Round
