= Al-Rustaq Club =

Omani sports club

Al-Rustaq Club نادي الرستاق
- Full name: Al-Rustaq Sports Football Club نادي الرستاق الرياضي لكرة القدم
- Nicknames: Eanaabi al-Jabal (Burgundy Mountain)
- Founded: 1986 (as Al-Shaab); 1986; 40 years ago
- Ground: Al-Rustaq Sports Complex Stadium; Rustaq, Oman
- Capacity: 17,000
- Chairman: Hilal al-Busaidi
- Manager: Catalin Dinu
- League: Oman Professional League
- 2025–26: 14th of 14
Home colours	Away colours

Al-Rustaq Sports Football Club (Arabic: نادي الرستاق الرياضي لكرة القدم) is an Omani sports club based in Rustaq, Oman. In 2016, the club was promoted to the first tier for the first time in its history. For the 2022–23 season, they competed in the Oman Professional League.

== Honours ==
=== League ===
- Oman First Division League (Tier 2)
  - Winners (1): 2015–16

== Players ==
=== First team squad ===
Al-Rustaq Club players squad for the 2023–24 season.
Note: Flags indicate national team as defined under FIFA eligibility rules; some limited exceptions apply. Players may hold more than one non-FIFA nationality.

No.	Pos.	Nation	Player
1	GK	OMA	Islam Al-Hinai
2	DF	OMA	Youssef Al-Mamari
3	DF	OMA	Musab Al-Shaqsy
4	MF	OMA	Yassen Al-Sheyadi
7	MF	BDI	Abdul Razak Fiston
8	MF	OMA	Abdullah Al-Habshi
9	FW	OMA	Nassib Al-Ghailani
10	MF	OMA	Hamza Salem Al-Abri
11	FW	OMA	Mahmood Al-Shaqsy
12	DF	OMA	Qusay Al-Mamari
14	FW	OMA	Ammar Saif
15	MF	BRA	Douglas Carioca
16	DF	OMA	Montaser Al-Zadjali
17	MF	OMA	Khalil Ibrahim
18	DF	OMA	Hudhaifa Al-Mamari
19	MF	OMA	Ahmed Al-Adawi
20	DF	OMA	Abas Al-Hashami

No.	Pos.	Nation	Player
21	MF	OMA	Musab Al-Mamari
22	MF	OMA	Ahmed Al-Harmali
23	GK	OMA	Sultan Al-Ruqadi
24	FW	OMA	Zeyad Al-Mahfoundi
25	DF	OMA	Khaled Al-Hadabi
26	FW	OMA	Saeed Al-Adawi
28	DF	OMA	Mohammed Al-Khalidi
45	MF	OMA	Badar Al-Jabri
47	DF	OMA	Abdul Azim Al-Ajmi
55	GK	OMA	Ali Al-Rawahi
70	MF	OMA	Ahed Al-Mashaiki
77	MF	OMA	Mohamed Al-Ghafri
78	FW	OMA	Ibrahim Al-Harrasi
—	DF	CIV	Bangaly Soumahoro
—	MF	OMA	Mohammed Al-Harasi
—	DF	OMA	Samih Al-Hamrashdi
