= Nizwa Sports Complex =

- Nizwa Sports Complex
- Interactive map of Nizwa Sports Complex
- Full name: Nizwa Sports Complex Stadium
- Location: Nizwa, Oman
- Coordinates: 22°54′16″N 57°35′22″E
- Capacity: 10,000

Tenant
- Al-Khabourah SC

Nizwa Sports Complex is a multi-use stadium in Nizwa, Oman. It is currently used mostly for hosting football matches and is the home ground of Al-Khabourah SC of the Omani League. The stadium has a capacity of 10,000 spectators.

== See also ==
- List of football stadiums in Oman
