= Al-Taliya Club =

Omani sports club

Al-Taliya Club نادي الطالعية الرياضي
- Full name: Al-Taliya Club
- Founded: 1962; 64 years ago
- Ground: Sur Sports Complex; Sur, Oman
- Capacity: 8,000
- League: First Division (Group A)
- 2015–16: 5th
Home colours	Away colours

Al-Taliya Club (Arabic: نادي الطليعة الرياضي) is an Omani sports club based in Sur, Oman. The club is mainly known for its football team, which currently plays in the Oman First Division League of Oman Football Association. The club also has teams in other sports, such as hockey, volleyball, handball, basketball, badminton and squash.

Their home ground is Sur Sports Complex. The stadium is government owned, but they also own their personal stadium and sports equipment, as well as their own training facilities. The club also operates a youth football team which competes in the Omani Youth league.

== Colors, kit providers and sponsors ==
Al-Taliya SC have been known since establishment to wear a full orange (with black shorts) or black (with orange shorts) (Away) kit, varying themselves from neighbors Al-Oruba SC (white) and Sur SC (blue) kits. They have also had many different sponsors over the years.

== Honours and achievements ==
=== National titles ===
- Sultan Qaboos Cup (1):

- Winners 1974
