= Bahla Club =

Omani sports club

- Full name: Bahla Club
- Founded: 1971; 55 years ago
- Ground: Nizwa Sport Complex
- Capacity: 10,000
- Manager: Youssef Al-Rifali
- League: Oman Professional League
- 2025–26: 5th of 12
Home colours	Away colours	Third colours

Bahla Club (Arabic: نادي بهلاء) is an Omani sports club based in Bahla. They are best known for the professional football section, currently playing in the Oman Professional League of Oman Football Association.

== Players ==
=== First-team squad ===
Note: Flags indicate national team as defined under FIFA eligibility rules; some limited exceptions apply. Players may hold more than one non-FIFA nationality.

No.	Pos.	Nation	Player
1	GK	OMA	Al-Muhtadi Al-Abri
2	DF	OMA	Mahboob Al-Hadabi
4	DF	CMR	Luke Vikeme Ndifon
5	DF	OMA	Marwan Al-Ghafri
6	MF	GHA	Rashid Abubakar
7	FW	OMA	Mahmoud Khalaf Al-Hinai
9	FW	OMA	Musab Al-Riyami
10	MF	OMA	Abdulhameed Al-Mandhari
11	FW	OMA	Osama Mohammed Al-Shakbili
12	DF	OMA	Ayman Al-Nabhani
13	MF	OMA	Mahdi Al-Rawahi
14	MF	OMA	Younes Al-Riyami (C)
15	DF	OMA	Mustafa Al-Ruqaishi
16	DF	OMA	Muhanad Al-Hasani
17	MF	OMA	Mohammed Al-Mafraji
18	MF	OMA	Mohammed Al-Aufi
19	MF	OMA	Ahmed Al-Abri

No.	Pos.	Nation	Player
20	MF	OMA	Nasser Al-Saqri
21	DF	OMA	Hudaifa Al-Balushi
22	GK	OMA	Salah Al-Hanzali
23	MF	OMA	Ibrahim Al-Shakyli
24	FW	OMA	Ali-Qasimi Al-Sulaimi
25	MF	OMA	Fahd Abdulsalam
26	MF	OMA	Mazen Al-Hinai
27	MF	OMA	Mahmoud Ali Al-Rashid
30	MF	BRA	Junior Timbo
33	FW	OMA	Mohammed Al-Amiri
40	MF	BRA	Rafael Bastos
66	GK	OMA	Salem Al-Daoudi
69	FW	OMA	Salah Al-Jadidi
70	DF	OMA	Majed Al-Shakhili
81	MF	OMA	Anas Al-Qasabi
88	DF	OMA	Tariq Al-Balushi
97	MF	OMA	Ilyas Al-Shakyli
