= Sidab =

- Village
- Location in Oman
- Coordinates: 23°36′N 58°36′E
- Country: Oman
- Governorate: Muscat Governorate
- Time zone: UTC+4 (Oman Standard Time)

Sidab is a village in Muscat Governorate, in northeastern Oman.
