= Fanja, Oman =

Fanja
- Location in Oman
- Coordinates: 23°28′3″N 58°6′22″E
- Country: Oman
- Subdivision: Ad Dakhiliyah Region

Population (2010)
  - Total: 10,396

Fanja (Arabic: فنجاء) is a town in the region of Ad Dakhiliyah, in northeastern Oman. As of 2010, it had a population of 10,396.

== See also ==
- Fanja Fort
- Fanja traditional suq
- Wadi Fanja
