= Al Ittihad Club (Salalah) =

Omani sports club

Al-Ittihad Club نادي الاتحاد
- Full name: Al-Ittihad Club
- Founded: 1965; 61 years ago
- Ground: Al-Saada Stadium; Salalah Sports Complex; Salalah, Oman
- Capacity: 20,000; 8,000
- Chairman: Sheikh Nayif Bin Salim Al-Marhoon
- Manager: Vacant
- League: Oman Professional League
- 2022–23: 13th
| Home colours | Away colours |

Al-Ittihad Club (Arabic: نادي الاتحاد) is an Omani sports club based in Salalah, in southern Oman. The club currently plays in Oman First Division League, first division of Oman Football Association. Their home ground is Al-Saada Stadium. They also recognize the older Salalah Sports Complex as their home ground. Both stadiums are government owned, but Al-Ittihad also own their personal stadium, sports equipment and training facilities.

== Being a multisport club ==
Although being mainly known for their football, Al-Ittihad Club like many other clubs in Oman, have not only football in their list, but also hockey, volleyball, handball, basketball, badminton and squash. They also have various youth football teams competing in Oman Olympic League, Oman Youth League (U-19) and Oman Youth League (U-17).

== Crest and colours ==
Al-Ittihad have been known since establishment to wear a full green or white (Away) kit (usually a darker shade of green), varying themselves from neighbors Al-Nasr S.C.S.C. (Blue), Dhofar S.C.S.C. (Red) and Salalah SC (Blue) kits. They have also had many different sponsors over the years. As of now, Nike provides them with kits.

== Current squad ==
Note: Flags indicate national team as defined under FIFA eligibility rules; some limited exceptions apply. Players may hold more than one non-FIFA nationality.

| No. | Pos. | Nation | Player |
|---|---|---|---|
| — | | NED | Bilal Amarzagouio |

== Honours and achievements ==
=== Domestic ===
- Omani League
  - Runners-up (1): 1985–86
- Oman First Division League
  - Champions (1): 2012–13
- Sultan Qaboos Cup
  - Runners-up (1): 2011

== Club performance-international competitions ==
=== UAFA competitions ===
- GCC Champions League: 1 appearance

- 2012–13 : Quarter-Finals
