= Ahli Sidab Club =

Omani sports club

Ahli Sidab Club نادي الاهلي سداب
- Full name: Ahli Sidab Club
- Founded: 2004; 22 years ago (18 April 2004 (as Ahli Sidab))
- Ground: Sultan Qaboos Sports Complex; Royal Oman Police Stadium; Boshar, Muscat, Oman
- Capacity: 39,000; 18,000
- League: Oman Elite League
- 2013-14: 2nd
Home colours	Away colours

Ahli Sidab Club (Arabic: نادي الاهلي سداب) is an Omani sports club based in Darsait, in the Wilayat of Muttrah, Oman. The club currently plays in the Oman First Division League, the second division of the Oman Football Association. Their home ground is Sultan Qaboos Sports Complex, but they also recognize the older Royal Oman Police Stadium as their home ground. Both stadiums are government-owned, but they also own their own personal stadiums and sports equipment, as well as their own training facilities.

== History ==
Ahli Sidab Club was founded on 18 April 2004, after merging the two local clubs, Al-Ahli and Sidab.

== Being a multisport club ==
Although mainly known for their football, Ahli Sidab Club, like many other clubs in Oman, has not only football on their list but also hockey, volleyball, handball, basketball, badminton, and squash. They also have various youth football teams competing in the Oman Olympic League, the Oman Youth League (U-19), and the Oman Youth League (U-17).

== Honours and achievements ==
=== National titles ===
- Omani League (1):

- Winners 1981–82
- Runners-up 1983–84

- Sultan Qaboos Cup (5):

- Winners 1972, 1982, 1983, 1984, 1988
- Runners-up 1995, 1998

- Oman First Division League (1):

- Winners 2009-10

=== Honours and achievements (Other Sports) ===
Hockey

- Sultan Qaboos Cup (7):

- Winners 1957, 1985, 1990, 1995, 1998, 2002, 2005
