= Sohar Regional Sports Complex =

Stadium in Sohar, Oman

Coordinates: 24.334584°N 56.743017°E

- Sohar Regional Sports Complex
- Interactive map of Sohar Regional Sports Complex
- Full name: Sohar Regional Sports Complex Stadium
- Location: Sohar, Oman
- Capacity: 19,000

Tenant
- Sohar Club

Sohar Regional Sports Complex is a multi-use stadium in Sohar, Oman. It is currently used mainly for hosting football matches and is the home ground of Sohar Club. The stadium has a capacity of 19,000 spectators.

Sohar's top best school known as Indian School Sohar also conducts sports events here

== See also ==
- List of football stadiums in Oman
