= Salalah Sports Complex =

Stadium in Salalah, Oman

Coordinates: 16.993304°N 54.024604°E

Salalah Sports Complex (Arabic: مجمع صلالة الرياضي), also known as The Youth Complex (Arabic: المجمع الشبابي), is a government-owned multi-purpose stadium in the Auwqad district of Salalah, in southern Oman. It is currently used mainly for football matches, and also has facilities for athletics. It is the home stadium of the Dhofar Football Club, as well as their counterparts Al-Nasr Salalah. Home matches are also played here for the first division team Al-Hilal.

== Salalah Sports Complex and the Saadah Stadium ==
After the recent construction and completion of the Al-Saadah Stadium in the Al-Saadah district of Salalah, many of the matches of Al-Nasr and Dhofar clubs have been played there. There is much confusion between the 2 venues when referring to the home stadium to be played by a team from Salalah, even when reported by the newspapers or the official websites of the clubs!

== See also ==
- List of football stadiums in Oman
