= Sur Sports Complex =

Multi-use stadium in Sur, Oman

Coordinates: 22.5277°N 59.4735°E

The Sur Sports Complex Stadium is a multi-use stadium in Sur, Oman. It is used mainly for holding football matches and also sometimes for athletics. It is the home stadium of Oman Professional League side Sur FC. The stadium has a capacity of 8,000 spectators and was opened in 1996.

== See also ==
- List of football stadiums in Oman
