= 2015–16 Oman Professional League =

Oman Professional League
- Season: 2015–16
- Champions: Fanja
- Relegated: Salalah; Sur
- AFC Cup: Saham; Al-Suwaiq
- GCC Champions League: Al-Suwaiq; Al-Oruba
- Matches: 182
- Goals: 405 (2.23 per match)
- Top goalscorer: (Croatia) Vedran Gerc (14 goals)
- Biggest home win: Al-Oruba 6–2 Dhofar (23 October 2015)
- Biggest away win: Al-Shabab 0–5 Al-Oruba (6 December 2015)
- Highest scoring: Al-Oruba 6–2 Dhofar (23 October 2015)
- Longest winning run: Al-Oruba; Fanja (4 games)
- Longest unbeaten run: Al-Suwaiq (16 games)
- Longest losing run: Al-Musannah (5 games)

The 2015–16 Oman Professional League (known as the Omantel Professional League for sponsorship reasons) is the 40th edition of the top football league in Oman. The season began on 13 September 2015 and conclude on 14 April 2016. The start of the 2015–16 Professional League season which was scheduled for 19 August 2015 was later postponed to 13 September 2015 following requests from five of the 14 participating clubs (Al-Oruba, Fanja, Al-Nahda, Saham and Sur). Al-Oruba SC are the defending champions, having won their fourth title in the previous 2014–15 Oman Professional League season. At the end of the 25th round, Oman Football Association announced that if the top two teams at the end of the last round end up with equal points, the two teams will play a home and away championship play-off on 28 April 2016 and 2 May 2016 at the respective home grounds.

The OPL season ended with Fanja SC outplaying Al-Suwaiq SC for a 2–0 victory and a record-equalling ninth domestic league crown on Sunday, 24 April 2016.

== Teams ==
This season the league had 14 teams. Bowsher Club and Al-Seeb Club were relegated to the Oman First Division League after finishing in the relegation zone in the 2014–15 Oman Professional League season. Sohar SC however again managed to play in the top division as they won the Relegation/Promotion playoff against Al-Rustaq SC who had finished third in the 2014–15 Oman First Division League to earn the Relegation/Promotion playoff spot. The two relegated teams were replaced by Oman First Division League winners Muscat Club and runners-up Salalah SC.

=== Stadiums and locations ===
Locations of teams in the 2015–16 Omani League

Note: Table lists clubs in alphabetical order.

| Club | Home city | Stadium | Capacity |
|---|---|---|---|
| Al-Khabourah SC | Al-Khaburah | Nizwa Sports Complex | 10,000 |
| Al-Musannah SC | Al-Musannah | Al-Seeb Stadium | 14,000 |
| Al-Nahda | Al-Buraimi | Al-Buraimi Sports Complex | 10,000 |
| Al-Nasr S.C.S.C. | Salalah | Al-Saada Stadium | 12,000 |
| Al-Oruba SC | Sur | Sur Sports Complex | 8,000 |
| Al-Shabab Club | Barka | Al-Seeb Stadium | 14,000 |
| Al-Suwaiq Club | Al-Suwaiq | Al-Seeb Stadium | 14,000 |
| Dhofar S.C.S.C. | Salalah | Al-Saada Stadium | 12,000 |
| Fanja SC | Fanja | Sultan Qaboos Sports Complex | 39,000 |
| Muscat Club | Muscat | Sultan Qaboos Sports Complex | 39,000 |
| Saham Club | Saham | Sohar Regional Sports Complex | 19,000 |
| Salalah SC | Salalah | Al-Saada Stadium | 12,000 |
| Sohar SC | Sohar | Sohar Regional Sports Complex | 19,000 |
| Sur SC | Sur | Sur Sports Complex | 8,000 |

=== Personnel and kits ===
Note: Flags indicate national team as has been defined under FIFA eligibility rules. Players may hold more than one non-FIFA nationality.

| Team | Head coach | Assistant coach | Captain | Kit manufacturer | Shirt sponsor |
|---|---|---|---|---|---|
| Al-Khabourah | (Algeria) (Italy) Mustafa Kiwa | (Oman) Ali Mubarak Al-Buraiki | (Oman) Ismail Al-Ajmi | Kappa; Hummel | Al-Hosni Group International; Seven Pro Media; Jabreen Converting Industries (JABREEN - Al-Hosni Group) |
| Al-Musannah | (Iraq) Thair Adnan | (Oman) Younis Al-Douhani | (Oman) Mohammed Al-Ghassani | Macron | Al-Khamayil; VIA International Engineering Consultancy LLC |
| Al-Nahda | (Oman) Khalifa Al-Muzahami | (Tunisia) Chedi Hajri | (Oman) Mansoor Al-Nuaimi | Uhlsport | |
| Al-Nasr | (Bosnia and Herzegovina) Senad Kreso | (Oman) Mohammed Al-Sairi | (Oman) Faiz Al-Rushaidi (Oman) Ahmed Salim Bait Said (Oman) Fahad Nasib Bamasila | Macron | Jeep |
| Al-Oruba | (Netherlands) Martin Koopman | (Oman) Faruq Abdullah | (Oman) Ahmed Al-Mukhaini (Oman) Saad Al-Araimi | Uhlsport | |
| Al-Shabab | (Oman) Waleed Zaid Al-Saadi | | (Oman) Younis Al-Mushaifri (Senegal) Sidy Keita | Macron | |
| Al-Suwaiq | (Morocco) Abderrazak Khairi | (Tunisia) Abdel Halim Bouardi | (Oman) Mohammed Al-Balushi (Oman) Anwar Al-Alawi | Uhlsport | Fatik |
| Dhofar | (Iraq) Mudhafar Jabar | (Romania) Alexandru Iliuciuc | (Oman) Nabil Ashoor (Oman) Hussain Al-Hadhri | Erreà | Bazarkan Transport Company |
| Fanja | (Oman) Sulaiman Al-Mazroui | | (Oman) Mohammed Al-Musalami | Uhlsport | CC Energy Development |
| Muscat | (Egypt) Sherif El-Khashab | (Oman) Aiman Al-Wahaibi | (Oman) Mohammed Huwaidi Al-Hooti | Peak | |
| Saham | (Syria) Abdul Naser Mkayes | (Syria) Muntasar Sat Abouha | (Oman) Mohsin Al-Khaldi (Oman) Yaqoob Al-Qasmi | Uhlsport; Joma | |
| Salalah | (Oman) Younis Amaan | (Oman) Saleh Abd Raboh | (Oman) Hashim Saleh | Nike | Al-Jisr Marble & Granite |
| Sohar | (Morocco) Mourad Moulay Hassan | | (Oman) Abdulaziz Al-Hosni (Croatia) Vedran Gerc | Joma | |
| Sur | (Oman) Ahmed Said Al-Gheilani | (Morocco) Youssef Al-Rafaly | (Oman) Ahmed Hadid Al-Mukhaini (Oman) Ali Al-Farsi | Uhlsport | |

=== Managerial changes ===
| Team | Outgoing Manager | Manner of departure | Date of vacancy | Position in table | Incoming Manager | Date of appointment |
|---|---|---|---|---|---|---|
| Al-Khabourah | (Iraq) Yaseen Amal | Resigned | 16 November 2015 | 8th | (Syria) Mohammed Juma | 16 November 2015 |
| Al-Khabourah | (Syria) Mohammed Juma | Sacked | 7 December 2015 | 10th | (Algeria) (Italy) Mustafa Kiwa | 17 December 2015 |
| Al-Musannah | (Oman) Musabah Al-Saadi | Resigned | 21 March 2016 | 9th | (Oman) Younis Al-Douhani | 21 March 2016 |
| Al-Musannah | (Oman) Younis Al-Douhani | Caretaker Role Finished | 16 April 2016 | 11th | (Iraq) Thair Adnan | 16 April 2016 |
| Al-Nahda | (Spain) (Morocco) Hicham Jadrane | Sacked | 1 February 2016 | 8th | (Oman) Khalifa Al-Muzahami | 1 February 2016 |
| Al-Nasr | (Tunisia) Lotfi Rhim | Sacked | 28 October 2015 | 10th | (Oman) Mohammed Al-Sairi | 28 October 2015 |
| Al-Nasr | (Oman) Mohammed Al-Sairi | Caretaker Role Finished | 9 November 2015 | 10th | (Belgium) Luc Eymael | 9 November 2015 |
| Al-Nasr | (Belgium) Luc Eymael | Mutual consent | 24 December 2015 | 9th | (Oman) Mohammed Al-Sairi | 24 December 2015 |
| Al-Nasr | (Oman) Mohammed Al-Sairi | Caretaker Role Finished | 6 January 2016 | 6th | (Serbia) (France) Dragan Cvetković | 6 January 2016 |
| Al-Nasr | (Serbia) (France) Dragan Cvetković | Sacked | 2 February 2016 | 7th | (Bosnia and Herzegovina) Senad Kreso | 2 February 2016 |
| Al-Oruba | (Iraq) Mudhafar Jabar | Mutual Consent | 22 November 2015 | 5th | (Oman) Faruq Abdullah | 22 November 2015 |
| Al-Oruba | (Oman) Faruq Abdullah | Caretaker Role Finished | 28 November 2015 | 3rd | (Montenegro) Milovan Minja Prelević | 29 November 2015 |
| Al-Oruba | (Montenegro) Milovan Minja Prelević | Sacked | 27 January 2016 | 1st | (Oman) Faruq Abdullah | 27 January 2016 |
| Al-Oruba | (Oman) Faruq Abdullah | Caretaker Role Finished | 4 February 2016 | 1st | (Netherlands) Martin Koopman | 4 February 2016 |
| Al-Shabab | (Oman) Khalfan Al-Yahyai | Sacked | 7 February 2015 | 14th | (Oman) Waleed Zaid Al-Saadi | 7 February 2015 |
| Al-Shabab | (Oman) Waleed Zaid Al-Saadi | Caretaker Role Finished | 15 October 2015 | 11th | (Bosnia and Herzegovina) Dženis Ćosić | 15 October 2015 |
| Al-Shabab | (Bosnia and Herzegovina) Dženis Ćosić | Sacked | 19 December 2015 | 11th | (Oman) Waleed Zaid Al-Saadi | 19 December 2015 |
| Dhofar | (Tunisia) Samir Chammam | Mutual Consent | 23 September 2015 | 4th | (Romania) Grigore Sichitiu | 23 September 2015 |
| Dhofar | (Romania) Grigore Sichitiu | Sacked | 23 November 2015 | 6th | (Iraq) Mudhafar Jabar | 23 November 2015 |
| Fanja | (Oman) Abdulraheem Al-Hajri | Sacked | 30 November 2015 | 5th | (Oman) Sulaiman Al-Mazroui | 30 November 201511 December 2015 |
| Fanja | (Oman) Sulaiman Al-Mazroui | Caretaker Role Finished | 11 December 2015 | 5th | (Tunisia) Lotfi Jebara | 11 December 2015 |
| Fanja | (Tunisia) Lotfi Jebara | Sacked | 6 April 2016 | 3rd | (Oman) Sulaiman Al-Mazroui | 6 April 2016 |
| Muscat | (Portugal) Divaldo Alves | Sacked | 24 October 2015 | 14th | (Egypt) Sherif El-Khashab | 24 October 2015 |
| Saham | (Romania) Aristică Cioabă | Sacked | 24 January 2016 | 9th | (Syria) Abdul Naser Mkayes | 24 January 2016 |
| Salalah | (Bosnia and Herzegovina) Senad Kreso | Sacked | 22 January 2016 | 14th | (Oman) Younis Amaan | 22 January 2016 |
| Sohar | (Syria) Abdul Naser Mkayes | Resigned | 20 January 2016 | 5th | (Syria) Muntasar Sat Abouha | 20 January 2016 |
| Sohar | (Syria) Muntasar Sat Abouha | Resigned | 24 January 2016 | 5th | (Serbia) (France) Darko Janacković | 24 January 2016 |
| Sohar | (Serbia) (France) Darko Janacković | Sacked | 29 March 2016 | 8th | (Morocco) Mourad Moulay Hassan | 29 March 2016 |
| Sur | (Belgium) Pieter Demol | Sacked | 24 October 2015 | 10th | (Oman) Mubarak Al-Gheilani | 22 November 2015 |
| Sur | (Oman) Mubarak Al-Gheilani | Resigned | 24 January 2016 | 12th | (Morocco) Driss El Mrabet | 28 January 2016 |
| Sur | (Morocco) Driss El Mrabet | Resigned | 5 April 2016 | 13th | (Oman) Ahmed Said Al-Gheilani | 5 April 2016 |

=== Foreign players ===
Restricting the number of foreign players strictly to four per team, including a slot for a player from AFC countries. A team could use four foreign players on the field during each game including at least one player from the AFC country.

| Club | Player 1 | Player 2 | Player 3 | AFC Player | Former Players |
|---|---|---|---|---|---|
| Al-Khabourah | (Nigeria) Jacob Aikhionbare | (Senegal) Mame Balla Diop | (Egypt) Mohamed Talaat | TBD | (Georgia (country)) Zviad Sikharulia (Brazil) Igor Carneiro Luiz |
| Al-Musannah | (Brazil) Fernando Evangelista dos Santos | (Brazil) Everton Souza Santos | (Brazil) Anderson Bina | TBD | (Syria) Belal Abduldaim (Brazil) David da Silva (Brazil) Thiago Brito |
| Al-Nahda | (Mali) Souleymane Demba | (Morocco) (France) Mounir Diane | (Cameroon) Feupa Jean Francois | TBD | (Tunisia) Chihab Zoghlami (Gabon) (France) Gilles Mbang Ondo (Iraq) Muayad Khalid |
| Al-Nasr | (Ivory Coast) Mechac Koffi | (Ivory Coast) Mamadou Soro Nanga | (Kenya) Jamal Mohammed | (South Korea) Kim Gwi-hyeon | (Mali) Lamine Diawara |
| Al-Oruba | (South Africa) Lyle Peters | (Mali) Moussa Koné | (Kyrgyzstan) (Russia) Edgar Bernhardt | (Yemen) Abdulwasea Al-Matari | (Ghana) Hans Kwofie (Ghana) James Kotei |
| Al-Shabab | (Brazil) Roniere Jose Da Silva Filho | (Senegal) Ely Cissé | (Senegal) Sidy Keita | TBD | (Syria) Amro Jenyat (Brazil) Douglas Silveira (Brazil) Guilherme Guedes |
| Al-Suwaiq | (Republic of the Congo) Lys Mouithys | (Senegal) | TBD | (Syria) Abdulatif Salkini | (Ivory Coast) Abdoulaye Koffi (Senegal) Mouhamed Ablaye Gaye |
| Dhofar | (Ivory Coast) Ben Konaté | (Cameroon) Didier Bassamagne Moundoubou | (Nigeria) Thomas Edwards | (Syria) Hamdi Al Masri | (France) Samir Malcuit (Tunisia) Arbi Jabeur (Tunisia) Khaled Gharsallaoui (Yemen) Ahmed Al-Hifi (Ivory Coast) Salifou Fofana |
| Fanja | (Brazil) Jarlisson Santana Garces Pereira | (Sudan) Sami Al-Amin | (Mauritania) Moustapha Diaw | TBD | (Syria) Khaled Al-Brijawi |
| Muscat | (Brazil) Vinícius Calamari | (Senegal) Mignane Diouf | (Senegal) Abdou Kader Fall | (Syria) Khaled Al-Brijawi | (Brazil) Paulo Sérgio (Burkina Faso) Ousseni Zongo (Syria) Salim Khedrah |
| Saham | (Brazil) Alexandre Matão | (Burkina Faso) Pierre Koulibaly | (Senegal) Abdoulaye Dieng | (Yemen) Hamada Al-Zubairi | (Brazil) (Italy) Vítor Huvos (Mali) Founéké Sy (Syria) Belal Abduldaim (Ivory Coast) Diakite Brahima (Nigeria) Efosa Eguakun |
| Salalah | (Brazil) Thiago Amaral | (Ghana) Paa Ernest | (Egypt) Ateya El-Belqasy | (Iraq) Ibrahim Kamil | (Kuwait) Yousuf Saad (Nigeria) Aremu Philip (Syria) Hamzeh Al Aitoni |
| Sohar | (Croatia) Vedran Gerc | (Croatia) Marin Con | (Croatia) Admir Malkic | (Kyrgyzstan) Ivan Filatov | (Romania) Dan Ignat (Morocco) Hamada Barakat (Iraq) Ibrahim Kamil |
| Sur | (Brazil) Jefferson de Jesus Florencio | (Togo) Komlan Amewou | (Ivory Coast) Claude Signone | TBD | (Mali) Salif Ballo (Mali) Mohamed Traoré (Cameroon) (France) Cédric Tchoumbé (Timor-Leste) (Brazil) Alan Leandro (Cameroon) Bong Bertrand |

== League table ==
| Pos | Team | Pld | W | D | L | GF | GA | GD | Pts | Qualification or relegation |
|---|---|---|---|---|---|---|---|---|---|---|
| 1 | Fanja (C) | 26 | 14 | 9 | 3 | 42 | 20 | +22 | 51 | 2016–17 Arab Club Championship play-off round |
| 2 | Al-Suwaiq | 26 | 12 | 12 | 2 | 30 | 20 | +10 | 48 | 2017 GCC Champions League |
| 3 | Al-Oruba | 26 | 13 | 8 | 5 | 37 | 17 | +20 | 47 | 2017 GCC Champions League |
| 4 | Dhofar | 26 | 10 | 9 | 7 | 37 | 36 | +1 | 39 | |
| 5 | Al-Nahda | 26 | 10 | 8 | 8 | 31 | 26 | +5 | 38 | |
| 6 | Al-Nasr | 26 | 9 | 10 | 7 | 22 | 22 | 0 | 37 | |
| 7 | Sohar | 26 | 8 | 11 | 7 | 30 | 26 | +4 | 35 | |
| 8 | Saham | 26 | 8 | 9 | 9 | 26 | 28 | −2 | 33 | 2017 AFC Cup group stage (Note: Saham, winners of the 2015–16 Sultan Qaboos Cup played in the 2017 AFC Cup group stage) |
| 9 | Al-Shabab | 26 | 8 | 7 | 11 | 29 | 40 | −11 | 31 | |
| 10 | Al-Khabourah | 26 | 6 | 12 | 8 | 27 | 26 | +1 | 30 | |
| 11 | Muscat | 26 | 7 | 9 | 10 | 30 | 33 | −3 | 30 | |
| 12 | Al-Musannah | 26 | 8 | 5 | 13 | 21 | 31 | −10 | 29 | Relegation Playoff |
| 13 | Sur | 26 | 3 | 12 | 11 | 23 | 34 | −11 | 21 | Relegation to 2016–17 Oman First Division League |
| 14 | Salalah | 26 | 3 | 5 | 18 | 19 | 45 | −26 | 14 | Relegation to 2016–17 Oman First Division League |

Updated to match(es) played on 24 April 2016. Source: League Table
Rules for classification: 1) points; 2) goal difference; 3) number of goals scored.
(C) Champions

== Results ==
| Home \ Away | ALK | ALM | ALNH | ALN | ALO | ALSH | ALSU | DHO | FAN | MUS | SAH | SAL | SOH | SUR |
|---|---|---|---|---|---|---|---|---|---|---|---|---|---|---|
| Al-Khabourah | | 0–0 | 1–1 | 1–1 | 4–1 | 2–2 | 0–1 | 0–0 | 1–3 | 2–2 | 1–2 | 1–0 | 2–1 | 1–0 |
| Al-Musannah | 1–0 | | 3–1 | 2–0 | 0–1 | 2–0 | 0–0 | 1–2 | 0–1 | 0–2 | 1–3 | 1–1 | 2–1 | 1–1 |
| Al-Nahda | 2–1 | 1–2 | | 2–0 | 0–2 | 3–0 | 0–0 | 1–1 | 1–1 | 1–1 | 3–1 | 2–0 | 1–1 | 0–0 |
| Al-Nasr | 1–0 | 1–0 | 0–0 | | 1–3 | 1–0 | 1–2 | 1–2 | 0–0 | 1–2 | 3–2 | 2–1 | 1–1 | 1–0 |
| Al-Oruba | 0–1 | 0–1 | 0–1 | 1–0 | | 3–0 | 1–1 | 6–2 | 0–0 | 0–0 | 2–0 | 3–1 | 2–1 | 0–0 |
| Al-Shabab | 1–1 | 1–0 | 2–1 | 1–1 | 0–5 | | 1–1 | 0–2 | 0–1 | 2–2 | 1–0 | 2–3 | 3–2 | 3–1 |
| Al-Suwaiq | 0–0 | 4–2 | 1–0 | 0–0 | 0–0 | 3–1 | | 0–4 | 3–2 | 2–1 | 3–1 | 1–0 | 0–0 | 2–0 |
| Dhofar | 3–2 | 1–0 | 3–2 | 0–0 | 1–2 | 0–0 | 0–0 | | 0–0 | 2–1 | 2–5 | 1–0 | 1–1 | 3–2 |
| Fanja | 1–1 | 5–0 | 1–0 | 0–0 | 1–1 | 3–1 | 2–0 | 2–1 | | 3–0 | 2–0 | 2–1 | 1–0 | 4–2 |
| Muscat | 2–0 | 1–1 | 1–2 | 1–2 | 1–0 | 0–1 | 1–1 | 4–2 | 1–1 | | 1–2 | 2–1 | 2–4 | 1–1 |
| Saham | 0–0 | 1–0 | 0–1 | 0–1 | 0–0 | 1–1 | 1–1 | 1–0 | 1–2 | 1–0 | | 3–1 | 0–0 | 0–0 |
| Salalah | 0–4 | 2–0 | 0–2 | 0–1 | 1–3 | 0–4 | 0–1 | 1–1 | 3–2 | 0–1 | 0–0 | | 0–0 | 1–1 |
| Sohar | 0–0 | 1–0 | 3–0 | 0–0 | 0–1 | 2–1 | 2–2 | 3–3 | 1–0 | 1–0 | 0–0 | 2–1 | | 2–1 |
| Sur | 1–1 | 0–1 | 1–3 | 2–2 | 0–0 | 0–1 | 0–1 | 1–0 | 2–2 | 0–0 | 2–2 | 3–1 | 2–1 | |

Updated to match(es) played on 24 April 2016. Source: Results
Legend: Blue = home team win; Yellow = draw; Red = away team win.

== Clubs season-progress ==
| Team ╲ Round | 1 | 2 | 3 | 4 | 5 | 6 | 7 | 8 | 9 | 10 | 11 | 12 | 13 | 14 | 15 | 16 | 17 | 18 | 19 | 20 | 21 | 22 | 23 | 24 | 25 | 26 |
|---|---|---|---|---|---|---|---|---|---|---|---|---|---|---|---|---|---|---|---|---|---|---|---|---|---|---|
| Al-Khabourah | L | D | D | D | D | W | L | D | D | W | D | D | L | D | L | L | L | L | W | D | D | W | W | W | L | D |
| Al-Musannah | W | W | L | D | W | L | W | L | D | D | L | L | W | W | L | W | L | D | L | L | L | L | L | L | W | D |
| Al-Nahda | L | W | D | W | D | D | W | L | L | D | W | D | L | L | W | L | D | L | W | D | W | W | L | W | W | D |
| Al-Nasr | L | W | D | L | D | D | D | D | W | W | D | W | W | D | L | D | L | W | L | W | D | W | D | L | L | W |
| Al-Oruba | W | D | D | W | W | L | L | W | W | W | D | W | D | W | D | D | W | W | L | W | L | D | W | D | W | L |
| Al-Shabab | L | L | W | L | D | L | D | D | W | L | L | L | W | D | W | D | D | W | L | L | D | L | L | W | W | W |
| Al-Suwaiq | W | D | D | W | D | W | W | L | D | D | D | D | W | D | W | W | D | D | W | W | D | W | W | D | W | L |
| Dhofar | W | D | D | W | L | W | L | W | W | L | D | D | W | D | D | W | L | L | W | L | D | L | D | W | W | D |
| Fanja | W | D | D | D | D | W | L | W | D | W | W | W | L | D | D | D | W | W | W | W | L | W | D | W | W | W |
| Muscat | L | L | D | L | D | L | W | D | L | D | L | D | D | D | W | W | D | L | L | W | D | W | W | L | L | W |
| Saham | W | L | L | D | D | D | W | W | L | D | W | L | L | D | L | D | D | W | D | W | W | D | L | W | L | L |
| Salalah | L | L | D | D | D | L | L | L | L | L | L | W | D | L | D | L | W | L | L | L | W | L | L | L | L | L |
| Sohar | W | D | W | D | D | W | W | D | D | D | W | L | D | L | D | L | D | D | W | L | D | L | W | L | L | W |
| Sur | L | W | D | L | L | D | L | D | D | L | D | D | L | W | D | D | W | D | D | L | D | L | D | L | L | L |

Updated to match(es) played on 24 April 2016. Source: Clubs Season-Progress
W = Win; D = Draw; L = Lose

== Promotion/relegation play-off ==
As of 2 May 2016

=== 1st leg ===
28 April 2016
19:00 UTC+4

| Al-Musannah | 1 - 1 | Ja'lan |
|---|---|---|
| Khalid Al-Buraiki 75' | | Jajani Baba 23' |

Al-Seeb Stadium, Al-Seeb, Oman
Attendance: Qasim Al-Hatmi (Oman)

=== 2nd leg ===
2 May 2016
19:00 UTC+4

| Ja'lan | 2 - 1 | Al-Musannah |
|---|---|---|
| Ibrahima Camara 21', 93' | | Al-Ghassani 28' |

Sur Sports Complex, Sur, Oman

Ja'lan earned promotion to 2016–17 Oman Professional League after winning 3–2 on aggregate.

== Season statistics ==
As of 24 April 2016

=== Top scorers ===
| Rank | Scorer | Club | Goals |
|---|---|---|---|
| 1 | (Croatia) Vedran Gerc | Sohar | 14 |
| 2 | (Oman) Abdulaziz Al-Muqbali | Fanja | 12 |
| 2 | (Oman) Hussain Al-Hadhri | Dhofar | 12 |
| 2 | (Oman) Mohammed Taqi Al-Lawati | Al-Oruba | 12 |
| 2 | (Oman) Said Obaid Al-Abdul Salam | Al-Khabourah | 12 |
| 2 | (Brazil) Vinícius Calamari | Muscat | 12 |
| 3 | (Oman) Qasim Said | Dhofar | 10 |
| 4 | (Brazil) David da Silva | Al-Musannah | 9 |
| 4 | (Oman) Mohsin Al-Khaldi | Saham | 9 |
| 5 | (Oman) Al-Abd Al-Noufali | Al-Suwaiq | 8 |
| 5 | (Oman) Amad Al-Hosni | Fanja | 8 |
| 5 | (Oman) Mohammed Al-Rawahi | Al-Nahda | 8 |

=== Top Omani Scorers ===
| Rank | Scorer | Club | Goals |
|---|---|---|---|
| 1 | (Oman) Abdulaziz Al-Muqbali | Fanja | 12 |
| 1 | (Oman) Hussain Al-Hadhri | Dhofar | 12 |
| 1 | (Oman) Mohammed Taqi Al-Lawati | Al-Oruba | 12 |
| 1 | (Oman) Said Obaid Al-Abdul Salam | Al-Khabourah | 12 |
| 2 | (Oman) Qasim Said | Dhofar | 10 |
| 3 | (Oman) Mohsin Al-Khaldi | Saham | 9 |
| 4 | (Oman) Al-Abd Al-Noufali | Al-Suwaiq | 8 |
| 4 | (Oman) Amad Al-Hosni | Fanja | 8 |
| 4 | (Oman) Mohammed Al-Rawahi | Al-Nahda | 8 |
| 5 | (Oman) Said Al-Ruzaiqi | Al-Nahda | 7 |
| 6 | (Oman) Khalid Al-Hajri | Al-Musannah | 6 |
| 6 | (Oman) Younis Al-Mushaifri | Al-Shabab | 6 |

=== Hat-tricks ===
| Player | Club | Against | Result | Date |
|---|---|---|---|---|
| (Ivory Coast) Abdoulaye Koffi | Al-Suwaiq | Al-Shabab | 3—1 | 18 October 2015 |
| (Oman) Mohammed Taqi Al-Lawati^{*} | Al-Oruba | Dhofar | 6—2 | 23 October 2015 |
| (Croatia) Vedran Gerc | Sohar | Muscat | 4—2 | 28 October 2015 |
| (Oman) Hussain Al-Hadhri | Dhofar | Al-Suwaiq | 4—0 | 27 November 2015 |
| (Oman) Abdulaziz Al-Muqbali | Fanja | Sur | 4—0 | 12 March 2016 |

^{*} Player scored 4 goals

== OFA Awards ==
Oman Football Association awarded the following awards for the 2015–16 Oman Professional League season.

- Top Scorer: Vedran Gerc (Sohar)
- Best Player: Mohammed Al-Musalami (Fanja)
- Best Goalkeeper: Riyadh Al-Alawi (Al-Oruba)
- Best Coach: Abderrazak Khairi (Al-Suwaiq)
- Best Team Manager: Hamdan Bait Said (Salalah)
- Fair Play Award: Fanja SC

== Media coverage ==
Oman Professional League Media Coverage
| Country | Television Channel | Matches |
|---|---|---|
| Oman | Oman Sports TV | 4 Matches per round |
| Oman | Oman TV | 3 Matches per round |
| Qatar | Al-Kass Sports Channel | 1 Match per round |

== Controversies ==
The league was the subject of controversies like the refusal of 2014–15 Oman Professional League and 2014–15 Sultan Qaboos Cup to play in the 2015 Oman Super Cup.

On 19 August 2015, the defending Oman Professional League and Sultan Qaboos Cup champions, Al-Oruba SC decided to pull out of the 2015 Oman Super Cup citing non-payment of dues by the Oman Football Association and a late release of its players from national and army team camps as the main reasons behind the club's decision to pull out. On 21 August 2015, Fanja was declared the winner of the Super Cup after its opponent, Al-Oruba, as expected failed to turn up for the match. On 6 September 2015, the defending champions were punished by the OFA's disciplinary committee for failing to turn up against Fanja in the 2015 Oman Super Cup. The defending champions of both the Oman Professional League and the Sultan Qaboos Cup were fined a sum of Omani Rial 500 and the committee decided that the club will play their first five 2015–16 Oman Professional League fixtures away from home.

== See also ==
- 2015–16 Sultan Qaboos Cup
- 2015–16 Oman Professional League Cup
- 2015 Oman Super Cup
- 2015–16 Oman First Division League
- 2015–16 Oman Second Division League
