= Ali Al-Busaidi =

Omani footballer (born 1991)

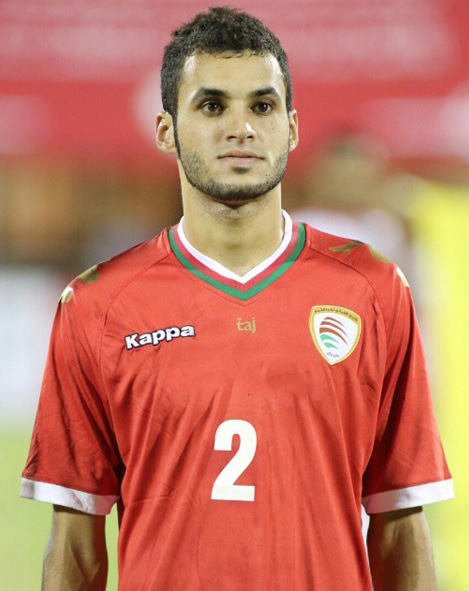
- Al-Busaidi with Oman in 2014

Personal information
- Full name: Ali Sulaiman Rashid Al-Busaidi
- Date of birth: 21 January 1991 (age 35)
- Place of birth: Sohar, Oman
- Height: 1.72 m (5 ft 8 in)
- Positions: Full back; winger; attacking midfielder

Team information
- Current team: Al-Seeb
- Number: 17

Youth career
- 2005–2009: Sohar

Senior career*
Years	Team	Apps	(Gls)
2009–2012	Sohar	58	(7)
2012–2013	Saham	23	(3)
2013–2014	Sohar	24	(3)
2014–2016	Al-Nahda	50	(1)
2016–2017	Dhofar	26	(1)
2017–2018	Al-Suwaiq	22	(6)
2018–2020	Dhofar	21	(3)
2020–	Al-Seeb		

International career^{‡}
2013–	Oman	101	(3)
Medal record
Men's football
Representing Oman
Gulf Cup
Runner-up	2024 Kuwait
- * Club domestic league appearances and goals ‡ National team caps and goals as of 18:50, 5 June 2025 (UTC)

Ali Sulaiman Rashid Al-Busaidi (Arabic: عَلِيّ سُلَيْمَان رَاشِد الْبُوسَعِيدِيّ; born 21 January 1991), commonly known as Ali Al-Busaidi, is an Omani footballer who plays for Al-Seeb Club in the Oman Professional League.

== Club career ==
=== Youth career ===
Born and raised in Sohar, Oman, Ali began his footballing career with his hometown, Sohar-based club, Sohar SC in 2005. He represented Sohar in various national tournaments at all the junior levels till 2009.

=== Sohar ===
Ali began his professional footballing career in 2009 with his parent club and Oman First Division League side, Sohar. Impressing the technical staff with his diverse style of play, he earned the captain's armband at various occasions throughout his stint at the Sohar-based club. He scored 7 goals in 58 appearances in his three-year spell at the club.

=== Saham ===
In early 2012, he moved to Saham where he signed a one-year contract with 2011–12 Oman First Division League winners and Oman Elite League side, Saham SC. In the 2012–13 Oman Elite League, he scored 3 goals in 23 appearances helping his side secure the 3rd position in the championship.

=== Back to Sohar ===
Earning promotion to Oman Professional League and hoping to play in the top level for a long time, Sohar SC's management decided to recruit some top quality nationals of which Ali, who was now in the good books of Oman's French manager, Paul Le Guen, was a part. Sohar SC, thus managed to obtain the services of this youngster who was famous for his capability of switching and getting adapted to various positions on the field. Adhering to the club's agenda, Ali who also served as the captain of the team in a number of games, helped his side secure the 7th position in the 2013–14 Oman Professional League which included a 2–1 win against the potential champions, Al-Nahda Club and a 1–0 win over Omani giants, Dhofar S.C.S.C.

=== Al-Nahda ===
Impressed with his vibrant display, defending champions of Oman Professional League and 2014 GCC Champions League semi-finalists, Al-Nahda on 7 October 2014 managed in obtaining the services of Omani international for the 2014–15 Oman Professional League. In his very first appearance for the Al-Buraimi-based side, he helped them win the 2014 Oman Super Cup with a 6–5 penalty win over Omani giants, Fanja SC.

He appeared in his side's 2015 AFC Champions League qualifying play-off match against Qatar's El Jaish SC which was won 2–1 by the home side at the Thani bin Jassim Stadium in Doha, Qatar.

=== Dhofar ===
On 5 June 2016, he signed a two-year contract with Omani giants, Dhofar Club He made his first appearance in the 2016–17 Oman Professional League on 17 September 2016 in a 2–1 win over Muscat Club and scored his first goal on 23 November 2016 in a 2–1 loss against his former side, Al-Nahda. He helped his side win the Oman Professional League for the historic 10th time after a long gap of 13 years making appearances in all the league games and playing a vital role in his team's success. He also led his side to the finals of the 2016–17 Sultan Qaboos Cup where they lost to Al-Suwaiq Club in the finals.

=== Al-Suwaiq ===
Soon after the 2016–17 season, news speculated that a lot of sides in the Oman Professional League are looking to have the services of Ali for the next season, with Al-Suwaiq Club behind ahead of others in the race. The speculations came to an end when on June 16, 2017 he signed a one-year contract with 2016–17 Sultan Qaboos Cup winners, Al-Suwaiq. He was adjudged the man of the match in his official debut for Al-Suwaiq in a 2–1 loss against his former side Dhofar in the 2017 Oman Super Cup. He made his first appearance in the 2017–18 Oman Professional League on 13 September 2017 in a 2–1 win over one of his former clubs, Saham. Later in 2018, Al-Busaidi helped his side lift the coveted Oman Professional League trophy after a long wait of 5 years.

=== Club career statistics ===
Club	Season	Division	League		Cup		Continental (Note: Includes appearances in the AFC Cup and AFC Champions League)		Other		Total	
Club	Season	Division	Apps	Goals	Apps	Goals	Apps	Goals	Apps	Goals	Apps	Goals
Saham	2012–13	Oman Elite League	23	3	1	0	0	0	0	0	24	3
Saham	Total		23	3	1	0	0	0	0	0	24	3
Sohar	2013–14	Oman Professional League	24	3	4	0	0	0	0	0	28	3
Sohar	Total		24	3	4	0	0	0	0	0	28	3
Al-Nahda	2014–15	Oman Professional League	25	1	4	1	0	0	0	0	29	2
Al-Nahda	2015–16	Oman Professional League	25	0	2	0	6	0	0	0	33	0
Al-Nahda	Total		50	1	6	1	6	0	0	0	62	2
Dhofar	2016–17	Oman Professional League	26	1	12	1	0	0	0	0	38	2
Dhofar	Total		26	1	12	1	0	0	0	0	38	2
Al-Suwaiq	2017–18	Oman Professional League	22	6	5	0	8	1	0	0	35	7
Al-Suwaiq	Total		22	6	5	0	8	1	0	0	35	7
Dhofar	2018–19	Oman Professional League	21	3	2	0	0	0	0	0	23	3
Dhofar	Total		21	3	2	0	0	0	0	0	23	3
Career total			166	17	30	2	14	1	0	0	210	20

== International career ==
Ali is part of the first team squad of the Oman national football team. He was selected for the national team for the first time in 2013. He made his first appearance for Oman on 9 October 2013 in a friendly match against Mauritania. He scored his first goal on 30 March 2015 in a 4–1 loss against African giants, Algeria as he came on as a second-half substitute for Qasim Said when Oman was trailing by 2 goals. With the score being 4–0 in favor of Algeria, Al-Busaidi converted a chance for his team 15 minutes before the final whistle. He has also scored a goal for the national side in a 2–0 win in an unofficial friendly match against Football League Championship side, Reading F.C. and also assisted the first goal for his side in the match.

=== WAFF Championship ===
He has 2 appearances in the 2014 WAFF Championship which include a 0–0 draw against Bahrain and a 0–0 draw against Iraq.

=== 2015 Asian Cup ===
He appeared for the national side twice in the 2015 AFC Asian Cup qualification, once in a 0–0 draw against Jordan and later in a 3–1 win over Singapore, helping his side top the Group A and hence qualify for the 2015 Asian Cup. He made his AFC Asian Cup debut on 10 January 2015 in a narrow 1–0 loss against Asian giants, South Korea.

=== Arabian Gulf Cup ===
He helped Oman qualify for the Semi-finals of the 22nd Arabian Gulf Cup and participated in Oman's historic 5–0 win over ten-time Arabian Gulf Cup winners, Kuwait, assisting the first and the last goal of the game, both scored by Abdulaziz Al-Muqbali.

In early 2018, Ali was instrumental in helping his nation win only its 2nd Arabian Gulf Cup title defeating the United Arab Emirates in the final on penalties following a goalless draw.

=== 2018 FIFA World Cup qualification ===
He made 5 appearances in the 2018 FIFA World Cup qualification, which include a 1–1 draw against Asian giants, Iran. In the match against the Asian giants, he assisted the first goal for his side which was scored by Saad Al-Mukhaini.

=== 2019 and 2023 Asian Cups and 100th international cap ===
Al-Busaidi was named in the Omani squad for the 2019 and 2023 Asian Cups. On 25 March 2025, he made his 100th international appearance in a 1–0 away win over Kuwait during the 2026 World Cup qualification.

== Career ==
=== International goals ===
Score and Result lists Oman's goal tally first

No.	Date	Venue	Opponent	Score	Result	Competition	Ref.
1.	30 March 2015	Suheim Bin Hamad Stadium, Doha, Qatar	Algeria	1–4	1–4	Friendly	
2.	16 December 2024	Sultan Qaboos Sports Complex, Muscat, Oman	Yemen	1–0	1–0	Friendly	
3.	31 December 2024	Sulaibikhat Stadium, Kuwait City, Kuwait	Saudi Arabia	2–0	2–1	26th Arabian Gulf Cup	
4.	20 March 2025	Goyang Stadium, Goyang, South Korea	South Korea	1–1	1–1	2026 FIFA World Cup qualification	

== Style of play ==
Al-Busaidi plays both an attacking role and a defensive role, most often playing as a left-back or as a winger, and is known in particular for his pace, dribbling, crossing and ability on free kicks. He is able to play on the left wing as well through the center of the pitch, making him a versatile attacker as well as defender. From a tactical standpoint, he usually plays in a free role, often drifting from the left wing into the centre when moving off the ball. Ali is known to be mentally sharp, with good vision and positioning, often predicting certain plays; he also possesses quick reactions, opportunism, balance, and agility. Although left-footed, he is also able to control the ball and cross well with his right foot.

== Honours ==
Al-Nahda

- Oman Super Cup: 2014

Dhofar

- Oman Professional League: 2016–17, 2018–19
- Sultan Qaboos Cup runner-up: 2016–17

Al-Suwaiq

- Oman Professional League: 2017–18
- Oman Super Cup: 2017

Oman

- Arabian Gulf Cup: 2017
