= Barakat (surname) =

Barakat (in Arabic بركات) is an Arabic surname. It is the plural form of Barakah (بركة) meaning blessing.

Notable people with the surname include:

- Adib Barakat (born 1982), Syrian footballer
- Adnan Barakat (born 1982), Moroccan-Dutch footballer
- Amin J. Barakat (born 1942), Lebanese-American physician
- Diala Barakat (born 1980), Syrian politician
- Fred Barakat (1939–2010), American basketball coach
- Ghaleb Barakat (1927–2014), Jordanian politician and diplomat
- Halim Barakat (1931–2023), American writer
- Hamada Barakat (born 1988), Moroccan writer
- Henry Barakat (1912–1997), Egyptian film director
- Hibat Allah Abu'l-Barakat al-Baghdaadi (1080s–1165), 12th-century philosopher and physicist
- Hisham Barakat (1950–2015), Egyptian Prosecutor General
- Hoda Barakat (born 1952), Lebanese writer
- Ibtisam Barakat (born 1963), Palestinian-American bilingual poet and writer
- Ihsan Barakat (born 1964), first female Supreme Court judge in Jordan
- Jack Barakat (born 1988), guitar player of pop punk band All Time Low
- Layyah Barakat (1858–1940), Christian missionary, writer, temperance activist, and prison reformer
- Melhem Barakat (1945–2016), Lebanese singer-songwriter
- Mohamed Barakat (born 1976), Egyptian footballer
- Mohammed Barakat (1984–2024), Palestinian footballer
- Nael Barakat, Kuwaiti engineer
- Najwa Barakat (born 1966), Lebanese writer
- Saleh Barakat, Lebanese art dealer
- Salim Barakat (born 1951), Syrian writer and poet
- Subhi Barakat (1889–1939), Syrian politician and head of state of Syria from 1920 to 1925
- Tayseer Barakat (born 1959), Palestinian painter, installation artist, curator
