= Ahmed Al-Rawahi =

Omani footballer (born 1994)

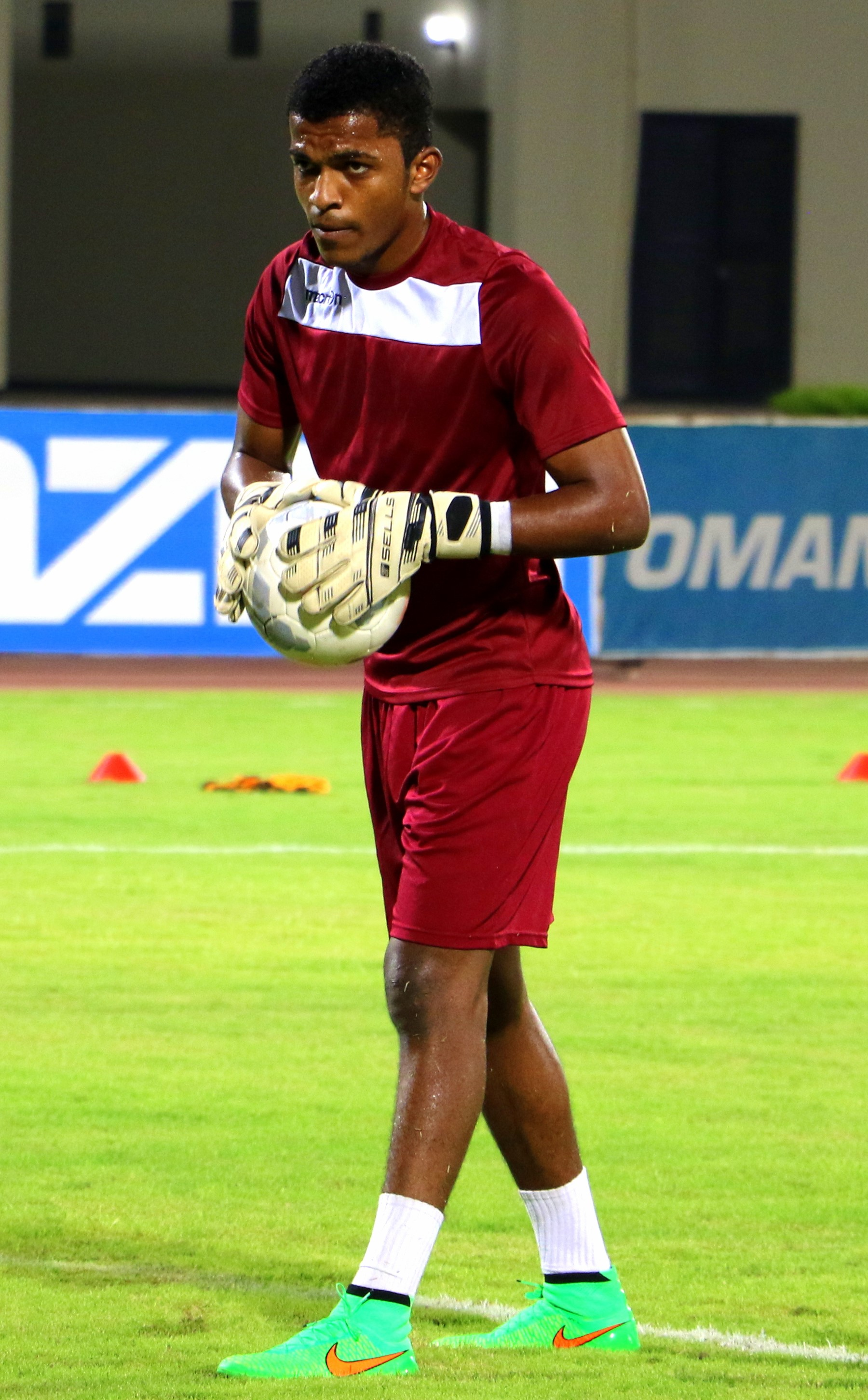
- Al-Rawahi with Al-Nasr in 2015

Personal information
- Full name: Ahmed Faraj Abdullah Al-Rawahi
- Date of birth: 5 May 1994 (age 32)
- Place of birth: Muscat, Oman
- Height: 1.85 m (6 ft 1 in)
- Position: Goalkeeper

Team information
- Current team: Al-Nasr
- Number: 1

Youth career
- 2009–2011: Samail
- 2011–2014: Al-Seeb

Senior career*
Years	Team	Apps	(Gls)
2014–	Al-Nasr		
2021–	Al-Seeb		

International career
2018–	Oman	4	(0)
- * Club domestic league appearances and goals

Ahmed Faraj Abdullah Al-Rawahi (Arabic: احمد فرج عبدالله الرواحي; born 5 May 1994), commonly known as Ahmed Al-Rawahi, is an Omani footballer who plays for Al-Seeb in the Oman Professional League.

== Club career ==
=== Al-Nasr ===
On 3 June 2017, Al-Rawahi extended his contract with Al-Nasr for another two seasons as the Salalah-based club showed faith in one of the country's finest keepers. Soon after the transfer of the club's and Oman national team's first choice keeper, Faiz Al-Rushaidi to Al-Suwaiq Club, Ahmed was promoted as the first choice keeper at Al-Nasr. The young keeper from Muscat did not disappoint and helped The King club win its 5th Sultan Qaboos Cup title defeating Sohar SC 6-5 on penalties after the match had ended 2-2 after extra time.

Before the beginning of the 2018-19 season, he also helped his side clinch their maiden Oman Super Cup title winning 4-2 on penalties against Al-Suwaiq after the match had ended 0-0 after normal time.

=== Al-Seeb ===
At the end of 2021, Al-Rawahi moved to Al-Seeb. As the first choice goalkeeper wearing the #1, he proceeded to win the 2021-22 Oman Professional League. Al-Seeb also won the Sultan Qaboos Cup and the AFC Cup in 2022, becoming the first Omani club to win a continental title.

Al-Seeb finished runners-up for the Sultan Qaboos Cup, and third in the league for the 2022-23 season, but the team succeeded in winning the Oman Super Cup.

== International career ==
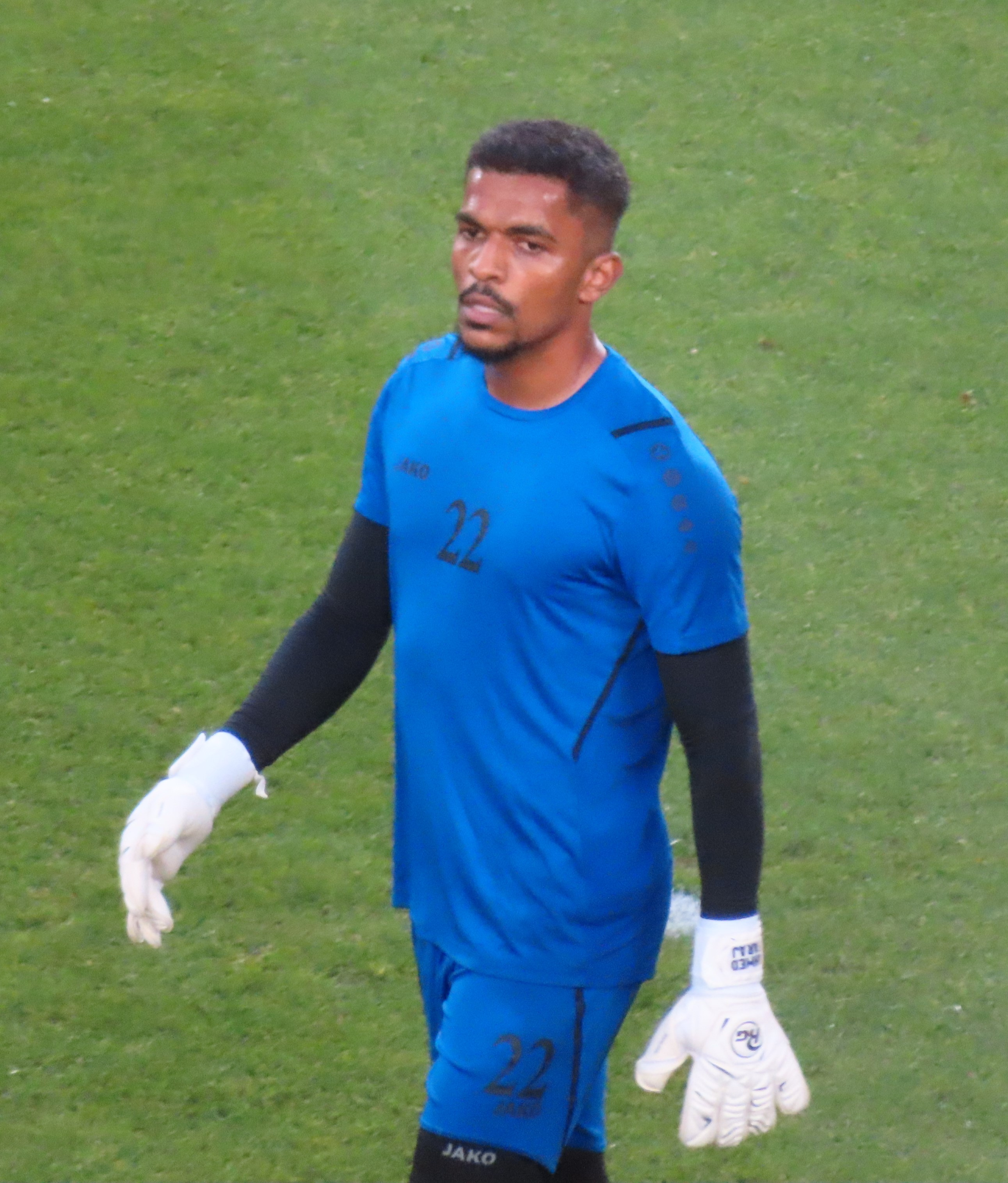
Al-Rawahi with Oman in 2023.

Ahmed is part of the first team squad of the Oman national football team. He was selected for the national team for the first time in 2018. He made his first appearance for Oman on 13 December 2018 in a friendly match against Tajikistan.

He was part of the Sultanate's squad for the 23rd Arabian Gulf Cup and helped his side win the title for only the second time in early 2018 defeating the United Arab Emirates in the final on penalties following a goalless draw.

== Personal life ==
Al-Rawahi's brother Mohammed Al-Rawahi has also capped for Oman.

== Honours ==
Al-Seeb U-21

- Oman U-21 League (1): 2013-14

Al-Nasr

- Sultan Qaboos Cup (1): 2018
- Oman Professional League Cup (1): 2016-17
- Oman Super Cup (1): 2018

Oman

- Arabian Gulf Cup (1): 2017

Individual

- Oman Elite League Best Goalkeeper: 2023–24
