= 2016–17 Oman Professional League =

Oman Professional League
- Season: 2016–17
- Champions: Dhofar (10th title)
- Relegated: Al-Khabourah; Ja'lan; Al-Rustaq
- Matches: 182
- Goals: 476 (2.62 per match)
- Top goalscorer: (Oman) Essam Al-Barahi (16 goals)
- Biggest home win: Dhofar 3–0 Fanja (30 September 2016); Dhofar 4–1 Saham (18 October 2016); Al-Nahda 3–0 Oman (31 October 2016); Oman 4–1 Sohar (5 November 2016); Al-Shabab 3–0 Dhofar (2 December 2016); Al-Nahda 3–0 Saham (2 December 2016); Al-Shabab 3–0 Al-Khabourah (24 February 2017); Al-Suwaiq 4–1 Saham (19 March 2017)
- Biggest away win: Al-Nasr 1–5 Muscat (16 February 2017); Al-Nasr 0–4 Al-Suwaiq (1 March 2017); Al-Rustaq 1–5 Oman (7 April 2017)
- Highest scoring: Saham 5–3 Ja'lan (10 May 2017)
- Longest winning run: Al-Shabab (4 games)
- Longest unbeaten run: Dhofar; Al-Shabab (10 games)
- Longest losing run: Al-Rustaq (7 games)

The 2016–17 Oman Professional League (known as the Omantel Professional League for sponsorship reasons) is the 41st edition of the top football league in Oman. The season will begin on 17 September 2016 and is set to conclude on 12 May 2017. Fanja SC are the defending champions, having won their record ninth title in the previous 2015–16 Oman Professional League season.

== Teams ==
This season the league has 14 teams. Sur SC and Salalah SC were relegated to the Oman First Division League after finishing in the relegation zone in the 2015–16 Oman Professional League season. Al-Musannah SC too failed to secure their spot in the Oman Professional League as they were defeated 3-2 on aggregate in the Relegation/Promotion playoff by Ja'lan SC who had finished third in the 2015–16 Oman First Division League. The three relegated teams were therefore replaced by Oman First Division League winners Al-Rustaq SC, the runners-up of Oman Club and third position holders Ja'lan SC.

=== Stadiums and locations ===
Locations of teams in the 2016–17 Omani League

Note: Table lists clubs in alphabetical order.

Club	Home city	Stadium	Capacity
Al-Khabourah SC	Al-Khaburah	Nizwa Sports Complex	10,000
Al-Nahda	Al-Buraimi	Al-Buraimi Sports Complex	10,000
Al-Nasr S.C.S.C.	Salalah	Al-Saada Stadium	12,000
Al-Orouba SC	Sur	Sur Sports Complex	8,000
Al-Rustaq SC	Al-Rustaq	Al-Seeb Stadium	14,000
Al-Shabab Club	Barka	Al-Seeb Stadium	14,000
Al-Suwaiq Club	Al-Suwaiq	Al-Seeb Stadium	14,000
Dhofar S.C.S.C.	Salalah	Al-Saada Stadium	12,000
Fanja SC	Fanja	Sultan Qaboos Sports Complex	39,000
Ja'lan SC	Jalan Bani Bu Hassan	Sur Sports Complex	8,000
Muscat Club	Muscat	Sultan Qaboos Sports Complex	39,000
Oman Club	Muscat	Sultan Qaboos Sports Complex	39,000
Saham Club	Saham	Sohar Regional Sports Complex	19,000
Sohar SC	Sohar	Sohar Regional Sports Complex	19,000

=== Personnel and kits ===
Note: Flags indicate national team as has been defined under FIFA eligibility rules. Players may hold more than one non-FIFA nationality.

Team	Head coach	Assistant coach	Captain	Kit manufacturer	Shirt sponsor
Al-Khabourah	(Egypt) Sherif El-Khashab	(Oman) Khalid Al-Alawi	(Oman) Ismail Al-Ajmi	Uhlsport	
Al-Nahda	(Oman) Khalifa Al-Muzahami		(Oman) Mansoor Al-Nuaimi	Uhlsport	
Al-Nasr	(Syria) Abdul Naser Mkayes		(Oman) Faiz Al-Rushaidi (Oman) Ahmed Salim Bait Said (Oman) Fahad Nasib Bamasila	Nike	Jeep
Al-Oruba	(Oman) Ahmed Al-Alawi	(Oman) Faruq Abdullah		Uhlsport	
Al-Rustaq	(Morocco) Al-Mustafa Suwaib	(Oman) Ibrahim Al-Salami		Erreà	
Al-Shabab	(Oman) Salim Sultan	(Oman) Hassan Al-Balushi		Uhlsport	
Al-Suwaiq	(Iraq) Hakeem Shaker	(Tunisia) Abdel Halim Bouardi	(Oman) Mohammed Al-Balushi (Oman) Anwar Al-Alawi (Oman) Mohammed Al-Musalami	Joma	Fatik; Oman & UAE Exchange
Dhofar	(Portugal) Manuel José Alves Ramos	(Romania) Alexandru Iliuciuc	(Oman) Nadhir Awadh Bashir	Adidas	
Fanja	(Sudan) Al-Taj Mahboob	(Portugal) Leanardo Joel Silva Viera	(Oman) Mohammed Al-Mashari	Select Sport	
Ja'lan	(Oman) Talal Al-Mashaikhi			Tatweg	
Muscat	(Oman) Mohsin Darwish Al-Balushi	(Oman) Sultan Al-Touqi	(Oman) Qasim Al-Balushi	Uhlsport	
Oman	(Spain) Andrés García Tébar	(Spain) Juan Bautista	(Oman) Mohammed Al-Busaidi	Adidas	
Saham	(Serbia) Zoran Popović	(Oman) Yaqoob Ismail	(Oman) Nasser Al-Ali	Uhlsport	
Sohar	(Syria) Emad Dahbour			Erreà	

=== Managerial changes ===
Team	Outgoing Manager	Manner of departure	Date of vacancy	Position in table	Incoming Manager	Date of appointment
Al-Khaboura	(Syria) Ammar Al-Shamali	Sacked	27 October 2016	11th	(Egypt) Sherif El-Khashab	28 October 2016
Al-Nasr	(Spain) Manu Calleja	Mutual consent	20 September 2016	6th	(Oman) Akram Habreish	20 September 2016
Al-Nasr	(Oman) Akram Habreish	Caretaker role finished	24 September 2016	2nd	(Syria) Abdul Naser Mkayes	24 September 2016
Al-Oruba	(Italy) Fabio Lopez	Sacked	23 September 2016	3rd	(Oman) Ahmed Al-Alawi	23 September 2016
Al-Shabab	(Oman) Waleed Al-Saadi	Mutual consent	29 December 2016	1st	(Oman) Salim Sultan	29 December 2016
Al-Suwaiq	(Morocco) Abderrazak Khairi	Sacked	23 September 2016	14th	(Oman) Ali Al-Khanbashi	23 September 2016
Al-Suwaiq	(Oman) Ali Al-Khanbashi	Sacked	24 October 2016	9th	(Iraq) Hakeem Shaker	27 October 2016
Dhofar	(Egypt) Hamza El-Gamal	Mutual consent	6 December 2016	2nd	(Romania) Alexandru Iliuciuc	6 December 2016
Dhofar	(Romania) Alexandru Iliuciuc	Caretaker role finished	1 January 2017	2nd	(Portugal) Manuel José Alves Ramos	1 January 2017
Fanja	(Portugal) Manuel José Alves Ramos	Sacked	1 November 2016	10th	(Portugal) Leanardo Joel Silva Viera	1 November 2016
Fanja	(Portugal) Leanardo Joel Silva Viera	Caretaker role finished	3 January 2017	8th	(Sudan) Al-Taj Mahboob	3 January 2017
Ja'lan	(Tunisia) Mohammed Al-Azari	Sacked	16 October 2016	14th	(Oman) Talal Al-Mashaikhi	16 October 2016
Muscat	(Egypt) Sherif El-Khashab	Sacked	24 October 2016	14th	(Oman) Sultan Al-Touqi	24 October 2016
Muscat	(Oman) Sultan Al-Touqi	Caretaker role finished	3 December 2016	13th	(Oman) Mohsin Darwish Al-Balushi	3 December 2016
Saham	(Syria) Abdul Naser Mkayes	Mutual Consent	1 September 2016	Pre-Season	(Oman) Musabah Al-Saadi	1 September 2016
Saham	(Oman) Musabah Al-Saadi	Sacked	19 October 2016	7th	(Morocco) Abdel Halim Bouardi	19 October 2016
Saham	(Morocco) Abdel Halim Bouardi	Sacked	6 November 2016	7th	(Serbia) Zoran Popović	10 November 2016
Sohar	(Iraq) Abdul-Ameer Ahmad	Sacked	8 September 2016	Pre-Season	(Morocco) Mourad Moulay Hassan	8 September 2016
Sohar	(Morocco) Mourad Moulay Hassan	Sacked	25 December 2016	4th	(Syria) Emad Dahbour	19 January 2017

=== Foreign players ===
Restricting the number of foreign players strictly to four per team, including a slot for a player from AFC countries. A team could use four foreign players on the field during each game including at least one player from the AFC country.

Club	Player 1	Player 2	Player 3	AFC Player	GCC Player	Former Players
Al-Khabourah	(United States) Noah Sadaoui	(Senegal) Mame Balla Diop	(Brazil) Paulo Vitor Hinvaitt Matos			
Al-Nahda	(Brazil) Ronir de Souza Gonçalves	(Ghana) Ibrahim Basit	(Cameroon) Jean-Francois Feupa Mkamwa			(Ivory Coast) Kipré Tchetche (Brazil) Luís Cláudio Carvalho da Silva (Yemen) Mohammed Boqshan
Al-Nasr	(Mali) Samba Tounkara	(Senegal) Fallou Gallas Wade	(Morocco) Abderrazak Ben Tairi	(Iran) Mohammad-Esmail Nazari		(Spain) Ferrán Tacón
Al-Oruba	(Ivory Coast) Zoumana Koné	(Nigeria)	(Nigeria)		(Yemen) Abdulwasea Al-Matari	(Nigeria) Waheed Oseni (Brazil) (France) Mamadou Fofana
Al-Rustaq	(Sweden) Sonny Karlsson	(Cameroon) Cédric Mandjeck	(Cameroon) Cédric Ayangma	(Egypt) Mohammad Fouad		
Al-Shabab	(Brazil) Lucas Gaúcho	(Brazil) Fernando Evangelista dos Santos	(Ghana) Paa Ernest	(Syria) Amro Jenyat		(Ivory Coast) Mechac Koffi
Al-Suwaiq	(Ivory Coast) Kipré Tchetche	(Senegal) Mamadou Diagne	(Iran) Milad Zeneyedpour	(Iraq) Saif Salman		(Croatia) Vedran Gerc (Timor-Leste) Fellipe Bertoldo
Dhofar	(Croatia) Admir Malkić	(Tanzania) Elias Maguri	(Ghana) Lawson Bekui	(Syria) Tamer Haj Mohamad		(Burkina Faso) Abdoulaye Cissé
Fanja	(Tanzania) Mrisho Ngasa	(Tanzania) Daniel Lyanga	(Uzbekistan) Nursultan Nst			
Ja'lan	(The Gambia)	(The Gambia)	(The Gambia)			
Muscat	(Croatia) Vedran Gerc	(Senegal) Mignane Diouf	(Senegal) Abdou Kader Fall	(Syria) Saad Ahmad		(Jordan) Ahmed Abu Halawa
Oman	(Brazil) Arthur Felix Da Silva	(France) Philtzgerald Mbaka				(France) John-Christophe Ayina (Chile) Francisco Pizarro (Kyrgyzstan) Anatoliy Vlasichev
Saham	(Brazil) Jildemar Dias Paixão	(Senegal) Abdoulaye Dieng		(Uzbekistan) Maksimilian Fomin		(Nigeria) (Bahrain) (Ivory Coast) Oussou Konan Anicet (Ivory Coast) Abdoulaye Koffi (North Korea) Kim Sang-sik
Sohar	(Romania) Alin Stoica					(Croatia) Admir Malkic (Senegal) Babakar

== League table ==
Pos	Team	Pld	W	D	L	GF	GA	GD	Pts	Qualification or relegation
1	Dhofar (C)	26	15	6	5	44	27	+17	51	2018 AFC Cup group stage
2	Al-Shabab	26	13	9	4	42	27	+15	48	
3	Al-Oruba	26	13	6	7	45	37	+8	45	
4	Al-Nasr	26	10	9	7	31	30	+1	39	
5	Fanja	26	10	7	9	42	40	+2	37	
6	Al-Suwaiq	26	8	12	6	35	25	+10	36	Qualification to 2018 AFC Cup play-off round (Note: Al-Suwaiq, winners of the 2016–17 Sultan Qaboos Cup played in the 2018 AFC Cup group stage)
7	Sohar	26	9	8	9	36	36	0	35	
8	Al-Nahda	26	9	7	10	33	33	0	34	
9	Saham	26	9	7	10	39	45	−6	34	
10	Muscat	26	7	10	9	36	36	0	31	
11	Oman	26	8	7	11	32	36	−4	31	
12	Al-Khabourah (R)	26	7	9	10	28	35	−7	30	Relegation Playoff
13	Ja'lan (R)	26	3	11	12	27	44	−17	20	Relegation to 2017–18 Oman First Division League
14	Al-Rustaq (R)	26	3	8	15	32	51	−19	17	Relegation to 2017–18 Oman First Division League

Updated to match(es) played on 19 May 2017. Source: League Table
Rules for classification: 1) points; 2) goal difference; 3) number of goals scored.
(C) Champions; (R) Relegated

== Results ==
Home \ Away	ALK	ALNH	ALN	ALO	ALR	ALSH	ALSU	DHO	FAN	JAL	MUS	OMA	SAH	SOH
Al-Khabourah		2–1	0–2	3–2	4–2	1–2	2–2	0–2	2–2	1–0	1–1	0–3	2–0	0–0
Al-Nahda	0–0		0–1	0–0	1–1	1–1	0–3	2–1	2–1	2–0	2–1	3–0	3–0	1–0
Al-Nasr	1–0	1–0		1–2	2–0	2–2	0–4	0–0	2–0	2–2	1–5	1–0	1–0	0–0
Al-Oruba	1–0	4–3	1–1		1–2	2–1	2–1	1–0	1–2	2–2	3–1	2–0	2–2	3–2
Al-Rustaq	3–1	2–3	2–2	1–2		0–0	1–1	1–2	2–2	1–2	2–1	1–5	0–3	2–3
Al-Shabab	3–0	1–0	3–2	2–1	1–1		1–1	3–0	4–3	1–0	0–1	1–0	1–0	0–2
Al-Suwaiq	1–1	2–1	0–0	3–1	2–0	1–1		2–1	0–1	0–0	2–2	0–1	4–1	0–2
Dhofar	1–1	1–0	2–1	1–1	1–0	2–2	2–0		3–0	4–2	2–1	3–1	4–1	2–1
Fanja	3–1	2–2	0–2	1–3	0–0	0–1	2–1	3–1		1–1	3–1	2–1	1–1	1–1
Ja'lan	0–0	0–1	3–3	0–1	2–1	1–4	1–1	1–1	1–3		0–2	0–0	1–2	2–1
Muscat	1–2	2–0	1–2	1–1	2–1	1–1	0–0	0–2	1–3	2–2		1–1	3–1	1–1
Oman	0–3	0–0	1–1	1–3	3–2	3–2	1–1	1–1	3–1	0–0	0–1		0–2	4–1
Saham	1–1	3–3	1–0	3–2	2–2	1–3	0–2	1–2	3–2	5–3	1–1	3–1		1–1
Sohar	1–0	4–2	1–0	3–1	3–2	1–1	1–1	1–3	0–3	3–1	2–2	1–2	0–1	

Updated to match(es) played on 19 May 2017. Source: Results
Legend: Blue = home team win; Yellow = draw; Red = away team win.

== Clubs season-progress ==
Team ╲ Round	1	2	3	4	5	6	7	8	9	10	11	12	13	14	15	16	17	18	19	20	21	22	23	24	25	26
Al-Khabourah	W	L	L	W	L	D	L	L	W	D	L	W	L	D	D	L	D	W	D	D	L	D	L	W	D	W
Al-Nahda	L	D	W	D	D	L	D	L	W	L	W	L	W	D	W	W	L	W	W	L	W	D	L	L	L	D
Al-Nasr	D	W	W	D	D	W	L	W	D	D	D	W	L	L	L	D	L	L	W	W	W	W	D	L	W	D
Al-Oruba	W	D	W	D	W	L	W	W	W	D	D	L	W	L	W	L	W	L	W	D	W	L	W	W	D	L
Al-Rustaq	L	D	L	D	W	L	D	L	D	D	W	D	L	W	L	L	D	L	L	L	L	L	L	L	D	L
Al-Shabab	D	W	W	D	W	W	D	L	W	D	W	D	W	W	W	W	D	W	L	W	D	W	L	L	D	D
Al-Suwaiq	L	L	L	D	W	D	D	D	L	W	D	D	D	D	L	W	W	W	D	W	D	W	W	L	D	D
Dhofar	W	D	W	W	D	W	W	W	D	D	L	W	L	W	W	L	L	W	W	D	W	W	L	W	W	D
Fanja	W	W	L	L	D	L	D	L	L	D	W	D	W	D	W	W	W	L	L	W	D	L	W	W	D	L
Ja'lan	L	D	L	L	L	D	D	D	D	D	L	L	W	D	L	L	W	L	L	D	D	L	D	L	D	W
Muscat	L	L	D	L	L	D	L	W	D	D	L	W	D	L	W	W	D	W	W	D	L	D	W	L	D	D
Oman	W	D	L	L	W	W	D	L	L	W	L	L	L	D	L	D	L	L	W	D	L	D	W	W	D	W
Saham	D	L	D	W	L	L	W	W	L	D	W	W	L	W	L	L	W	L	L	L	D	D	W	W	D	D
Sohar	D	W	W	W	L	W	D	W	D	L	D	L	W	L	D	W	L	W	L	L	D	D	L	W	L	D

Updated to match(es) played on 19 May 2017. Source: Clubs Season-Progress
W = Win; D = Draw; L = Lose

== Relegation playoff ==
=== First leg ===
24 May 2017
14:15

Mirbat	1–0	Al-Khabourah
	Report

Salalah Sports Complex, Salalah

=== Second leg ===
28 May 2017
18:30

Al-Khabourah	1–1	Mirbat
	Report

Sohar Regional Sports Complex, Sohar

Mirbat won 2–1 on aggregate and got promoted for the 2017–18 season.

== Season statistics ==
As of 19 May 2017

=== Top scorers ===
Rank	Scorer	Club	Goals
1	(Oman) Essam Al-Barahi	Al-Rustaq	16
2	(Cameroon) Jean-Francois Feupa Mkamwa	Al-Nahda	15
2	(Oman) Mohammed Al-Ghassani	Saham	15
3	(Brazil) Lucas Gaúcho	Al-Shabab	13
3	(Oman) Shawqi Al-Raqadi	Fanja	13
4	(Oman) Abdul Aziz Al-Muqbali	Fanja	10
4	(Mali) Samba Tounkara	Al-Nasr	10
4	(Oman) Al-Munther Al-Alawi	Oman	10
4	(Oman) Khalifa Al-Jahoori	Sohar	10
4	(Ghana) Lawson Bekui	Dhofar	10

=== Top Omani Scorers ===
Rank	Scorer	Club	Goals
1	(Oman) Essam Al-Barahi	Al-Rustaq	16
2	(Oman) Mohammed Al-Ghassani	Saham	15
3	(Oman) Shawqi Al-Raqadi	Fanja	13
4	(Oman) Abdulaziz Al-Muqbali	Fanja	10
4	(Oman) Al-Munther Al-Alawi	Oman	10
4	(Oman) Khalifa Al-Jahoori	Sohar	10

=== Hat-tricks ===
Player	Club	Against	Result	Date
(Oman) Abdulaziz Al-Muqbali	Fanja	Ja'lan	3—1	17 September 2016
(Oman) Khalifa Al-Jahoori	Sohar	Al-Nahda	4—2	19 October 2016
(Brazil) Lucas Gaúcho	Al-Shabab	Al-Khabourah	3—0	24 February 2017
(Oman) Omar Al-Malki	Al-Shabab	Fanja	4—3	27 April 2017

== Media coverage ==
Oman Professional League Media Coverage
Country	Television Channel	Matches
Oman	Oman Sports TV	4 Matches per round
Oman	Oman TV	3 Matches per round
Qatar	Al-Kass Sports Channel	1 Match per round

== See also ==
- 2016 Oman Super Cup
