= Manuel Ramos =

Manuel Ramos may refer to:

- Manuel Ramos (writer), attorney and crime writer
- Manuel Ramos (boxer) (1942–1999), Mexican boxer
- Manuel Ramos (footballer), Argentine footballer
- Manuel Ramos (football manager) (born 1982), Portuguese football manager
- Manuel Ramos (golfer) (born 1953), Spanish golfer
- Manuel João Ramos (born 1960), Portuguese anthropologist, artist and civil rights advocate
- Manuel Ramos Otero (1948–1990), Puerto Rican writer
