= Sidy Keita =

Senegalese footballer

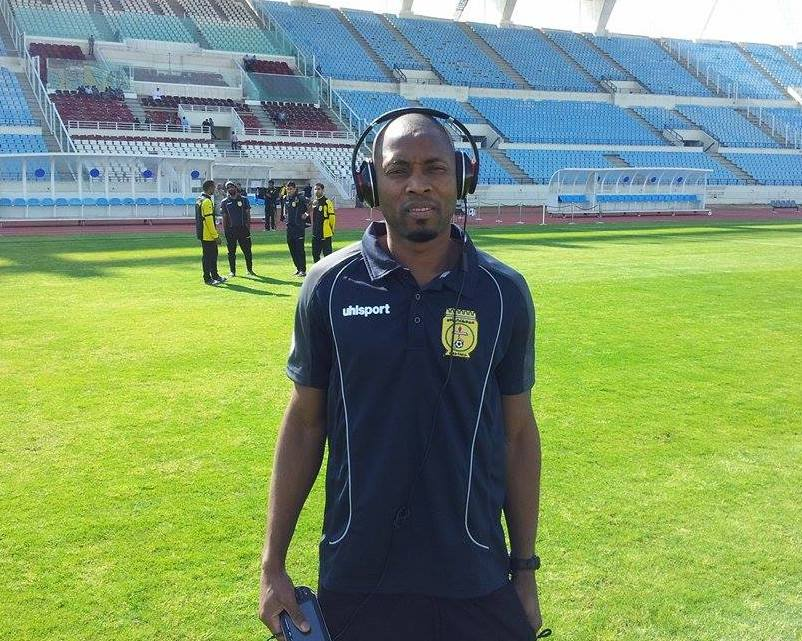
- Keita in 2013

Personal information
- Date of birth: 20 November 1987 (age 38)
- Place of birth: Dakar, Senegal
- Height: 1.80 m (5 ft 11 in)
- Position: Defensive midfielder

Team information
- Current team: Al-Shabab
- Number: 21

Senior career*
Years	Team	Apps	(Gls)
2003–2004	US Rail	?	(4)
2004–2006	AS Douanes	?	(1)
2007	Olympique Noisy-le-Sec	?	(0)
2007–2008	Olympique Saint-Quentin	?	(3)
2009–2010	US Saint-Omer	17	(1)
2011–2012	Calais RUFC	34	(3)
2012–2013	Fanja	32	(3)
2013–2014	Al-Shabab	24	(4)
2015–2016	Al-Shabab	19	(0)
- * Club domestic league appearances and goals

Sidy Keita (born 20 November 1987), commonly known as Keita, is a Senegalese professional footballer who plays as a defensive midfielder.

== Club career ==
=== Senegal ===
Keita began his professional footballing career in 2003 with Senegal Premier League club, US Rail. He scored 4 goals for the Thiès-based club in the 2003–04 season.

In 2004, he moved to Dakar where he signed a two-year contract with another Senegal Premier League club, AS Douanes. In his two-year spell with the Dakar-based club, he helped them win the 2005 Senegal FA Cup.

=== France ===
Keita first moved out of Senegal in 2007 to France where in January 2007, he signed a six-month contract with Championnat de France amateur 2 club, Olympique Noisy-le-Sec.

In July 2007, he moved to Saint-Quentin, Aisne where he signed a six-month contract with another Championnat de France amateur 2 club, Olympique Saint-Quentin. He scored 3 goals for the club in the 2007–08 season.

On 1 July 2009, Keita signed a one-year contract with Saint-Omer-based Championnat de France amateur 2 club, US Saint-Omer. He made his club debut on 15 August 2009 in a 3–3 draw against AS Poissy and scored his first and only goal for the club on 15 May 2010 in a 2–1 win over FC Drouais. In the 2009–10 Championnat de France amateur 2 season, he was also sent off in a 2–2 draw against Pacy Vallée-d'Eure as referee Mathieu Grin showed the Senegalese a second yellow card at the 66th minute. He scored 1 goal in 17 appearances in the 2009–10 season.

On 1 July 2010, Keita signed a one-year contract with another Championnat de France amateur 2 club, Calais RUFC. He made his club debut on 22 August 2010 in a 4–2 win over SC Douai and scored his first goal on 4 September 2010 in a 1–0 win over Sainte-Geneviève Sports. He scored 3 goals in 26 appearances in the 2010–11 Championnat de France amateur 2, helping his side win the Group B of the competition.

He made his first appearance in the 2011–12 Championnat de France amateur 2 on 20 August 2011 in a 2–1 loss against L'Entente SSG. He made 8 appearances for the Calais-based club in the 2011–12 Championnat de France amateur 2, thus ending his five-year spell with various Championnat de France amateur 2 clubs in France.

=== Oman ===
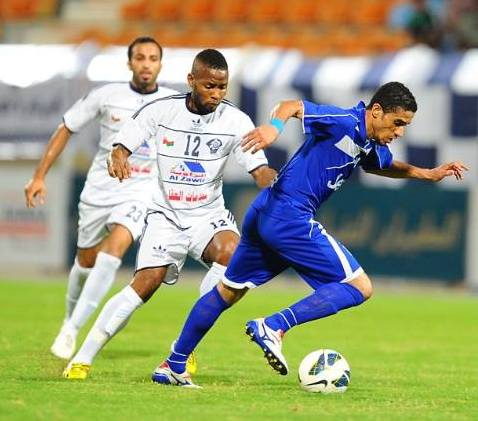
Sidy Keita - 2013–14 Oman Professional League

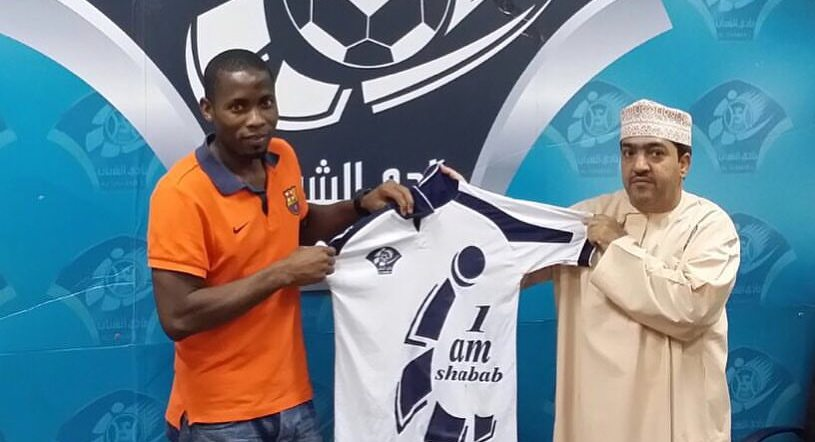
Sidy Keita - Al-Shabab Club

In June 2012, Keita again moved out of Senegal and this time to the Middle East to Oman where he signed a one-year contract with 2011–12 Oman Elite League winners, Fanja SC. He scored his one and only goal for the club in the Oman Elite League on 4 May 2013 in a 3–0 win over Al-Musannah SC and he scored another goal for the club on 28 December 2012 in a 2–1 win over rivals Al-Oruba SC in the quarter-finals of the 2012–13 Oman Federation Cup, thus helping his side reach the Semi-Finals stage of the competition where they lost 4–3 on penalties to eventual winners of the 2012–13 Oman Federation Cup, Saham SC. Keita also made his AFC Cup debut with the Omani club on 5 March 2013 in a 4–0 win over Lebanon's Al-Ansar SC and also scored his first goal in the Asian Football Confederation's club tournament on 1 May 2013 in a 3–1 win over Yemen's Al-Ahli Taizz S.C. He scored 1 goal in 6 appearances in the 2013 AFC Cup and helped his side reach the Round of 16 stage of the competition where the Omani club was outclassed 4–0 by Kuwait-based Al-Qadsia SC. He helped the Omani club secure the 2nd position in the 2012–13 Oman Elite League which helped them earn a spot in the 2014 AFC Cup and also helped them win the 2012 Oman Super Cup.

In 2013, Keita signed a one-year contract with Oman Professional League club, Al-Shabab Club. He scored his first goal for the club on 3 November 2013 in a 4–0 win over Salalah-based, Al-Nasr S.C.S.C. He scored 4 goals in 24 appearances in the 2013–14 Oman Professional League.

On 19 September 2015, he signed a one-year contract with his former club, Al-Shabab. He made his first appearance in the 2015–16 Oman Professional League on 21 September 2015 in a 1–0 win over Saham SC.

== International career ==
Keita was part of the Senegal national team reserve squad that participated in the 2004 and the 2005 LG Cup which were held in Lagos, Nigeria and Cairo, Egypt, respectively. He helped his side win the 2004 edition of the tournament and also helped his side achieve the runners-up title in 2005. Keita scored his first goal for the national side on 25 December 2005 in the Semi-Finals of the 2005 LG Cup in a 2–1 win over Ecuador. He also made an appearance in the finals of the 2005 edition of the competition on 29 December 2005 in a 4–2 loss against Egypt.

== Career statistics ==
=== Club ===
Appearances and goals by club, season and competition
Club	Season	League			Cup		Continental (Note: Includes goals and appearances in the AFC Cup)		Other		Total	
Club	Season	Division	Apps	Goals	Apps	Goals	Apps	Goals	Apps	Goals	Apps	Goals
US Saint-Omer	2009–10	CFA 2	17	1	5	2	0	0	0	0	22	3
Calais RUFC	2011–12	CFA 2	34	3	0	0	0	0	0	0	34	3
Fanja	2012–13	Oman Elite League	24	2	0	0	6	1	0	0	30	3
Al-Shabab	2013–14	Oman Professional League	23	4	2	0	0	0	0	0	25	4
Al-Shabab	2015–16	Oman Professional League	19	0	5	0	0	0	0	0	24	0
Al-Shabab	Total		42	4	7	0	0	0	0	0	49	4
Career total			117	10	12	2	6	1	0	0	135	13

=== International goals ===
Scores and results list Senegal's goal tally first, score column indicates score after each Keita goal.

List of international goals scored by Sidy Keita
No.	Date	Venue	Opponent	Score	Result	Competition	Ref.
1.	25 December 2005	Cairo International Stadium, Cairo, Egypt	Ecuador	2–1	2–1	2005 LG Cup	

== Honours ==
=== Club ===
AS Douanes

- Senegal FA Cup: 2005

Calais RUFC

- CFA 2: 2010–11

Fanja SC

- Oman Elite League: Runner-up 2012–13
- Oman Super Cup: 2012

=== International ===
- LG Cup: 2004; Runners-up 2005
