= Miss Jordan =

Beauty pageant

- ملكة جمال الأردن
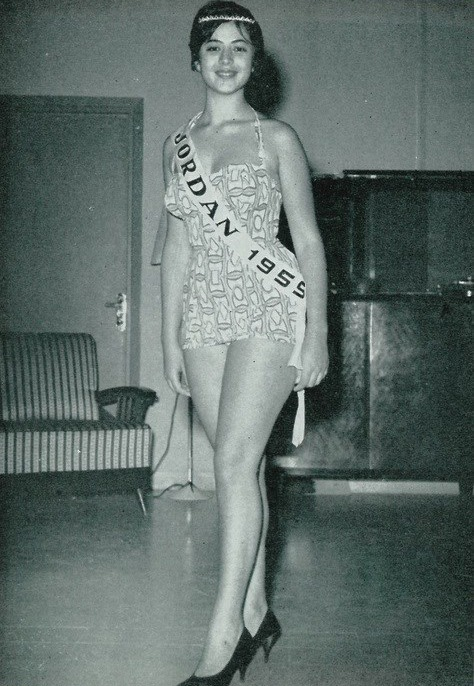
- Ufemia Jabaji, the first Miss Jordan 1959
- Formation: 1959
- Type: Beauty pageant
- Headquarters: Amman
- Location: Jordan
- Official language: Arabic
- Director: John Halabi, Jihad Magazine

Miss Jordan (Arabic: ملكة جمال الأردن) was a national Beauty pageant in Jordan.

== History ==
Miss Jordan was founded in 1959 and organized by Jihad Magazine under the directorship of John Halabi. It was an annual event held with the patronage of the Ministry of Tourism and Antiquities under Minister Ghaleb Barakat. Miss Jordan featured contestants from both Transjordan and West Bank which was at that time under Jordanian administration. Usually, two titles were awarded at the pageant "Miss Jordan" and the runner-up "Queen of Elegance". From 1959 to 1964, the pageant took place at the Hotel Philadelphia in Amman and was later moved in 1965 to Hotel Panorama in the city of Beit Jala in West Bank. Ufemia Rizk née Jabaji became the first Miss Jordan 1959. The pageant became the national franchisee of Miss World in 1959 and sent the first ever international representative from Jordan to Miss World the same year.

Over the course of its eight-year existence, the winners and runners-up of Miss Jordan competed at Miss World and other international pageants such as Miss International and Miss Universe. The pageant was held for the last time in 1966. The Arab-Israel war of 1967 led to the cancellation of the event indefinitely and the pageant has not been organized ever since. Subsequently, Jordan withdrew from Miss World and all other major international pageants. Vera Jalil Khamis from Jerusalem was the last Miss Jordan and representative of the country to Miss World 1966

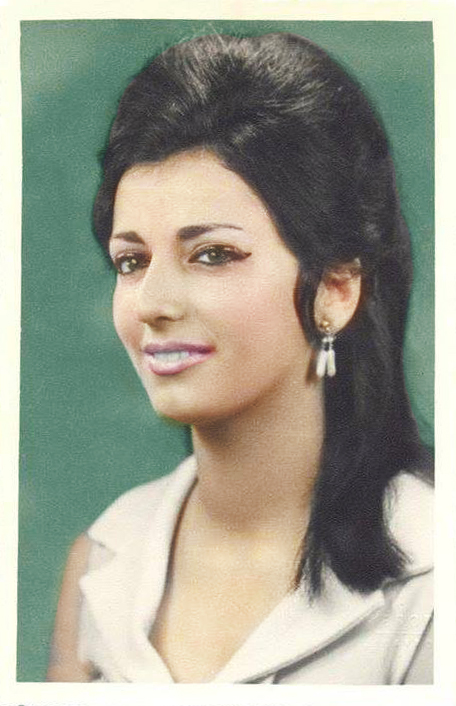
Vera Jalil Khamis was the last Miss Jordan and representative to Miss World 1966.

Year	Miss Jordan	Queen of Ellegance
1959	Ufemia Jabaji	Eriny Emile Sabella
1960	Eriny Emile Sabella	Gulnar Tucktuck
1962	Aida Anis Saba	Leila Emile Khadder
1963	Doris Tannous Haj	Despo Drakolakis
1964	Katie Barnaba Faizah	—N/a
1965	Nyla Munir Haddad	Marlene Rock
1966	Vera Jalil Khamis	—N/a

== Miss Jordan at International pageants ==
=== Miss Universe ===
- : Declared as Winner
- : Ended as runner-up or top 5/6 qualification
- : Ended as one of the finalists or semifinalists
- : Ended as special awards winner

Year	Miss Universe Jordan	Placement at Miss Universe	Special Awards	Notes
Did not compete since 1961—present
1960	Helen Giatanapoulus	Unplaced		

=== Miss World ===
- : Declared as Winner
- : Ended as runner-up or top 5/6 qualification
- : Ended as one of the finalists or semifinalists
- : Ended as special awards winner

Year	Miss World Jordan	Placement at Miss World	Special Awards	Notes
Did not compete since 1967—present
1966	Vera Jalil Khamis	Unplaced		
1965	Nyla Munir Haddad	Unplaced		
1964	Katie Barnaba Faizah	Did not compete		
1963	Despo Drakolakis	Unplaced		
1962	Leila Emile Khadder	Unplaced		
1961	Did not compete			
1960	Eriny Emile Sabella	Unplaced		
1959	Ufemia Jabaji	Unplaced		

=== Miss International ===
- : Declared as Winner
- : Ended as runner-up or top 5/6 qualification
- : Ended as one of the finalists or semifinalists
- : Ended as special awards winner

Year	Miss International Jordan	Placement at Miss International	Special Awards	Notes
Did not compete since 1964—present
1963	Doris Tannous Haj	Unplaced		
1962	Vivian Nazzal	Unplaced		
1961	Did not compete			
1960	Gulnar Tucktuck	Unplaced		
