= 2014 Oman Super Cup =

Al-Nahda	Fanja
0	0
- Al-Nahda won 6-5 on penalties
- Date: 29 August 2014
- Venue: Sohar Regional Sports Complex, Sohar, Oman

The 2014 Oman Super Cup was the 12th edition of the Oman Super Cup, an annual football match between Al-Nahda Club the champions of the 2013–14 Oman Professional League and Fanja SC, the winners of the 2013–14 Sultan Qaboos Cup. The match was played at the Sohar Regional Sports Complex in Sohar, Oman.

== Match details ==
29 August 2014
19:30 (UTC+4)

Al-Nahda	0–0	Fanja
Penalties
Al-Sinani (penalty scored); Al-Hinai (penalty scored); Al-Alawi (penalty scored); Al-Shamsi (penalty missed); Al-Busaidi (penalty scored); Al-Mukhaini (penalty scored)	6 – 5	Al-Jabri (penalty scored); Al-Muqbali (penalty scored); Al-Mashari (penalty missed); Saleh (penalty scored); Al-Rawahi (penalty scored); Al-Ruqadi (penalty scored); Al-Musalami (penalty missed)

Sohar Regional Sports Complex, Sohar, Oman
