= Abdulrahman Saleh (footballer, born 1986) =

Omani footballer (born 1986)

Personal information
- Full name: Abdulrahman Saleh Khalfan Al-Alawi
- Date of birth: 8 September 1986 (age 40)
- Place of birth: Oman
- Height: 1.82 m (6 ft 0 in)
- Position: Center back

Team information
- Current team: Al-Suwaiq
- Number: 27

Senior career*
| Years | Team | Apps | (Gls) |
| 2010–2011 | Al-Tali'aa | ? | (1) |
| 2011–2012 | Al-Musannah | ? | (1) |
| 2012 | Sur | ? | (0) |
| 2013–2014 | Al-Suwaiq | ? | (2) |
| 2014 | Fanja | ? | (0) |
| 2015– | Al-Suwaiq | | |

International career
| 2009– | Oman | 19 | (0) |
- * Club domestic league appearances and goals

Abdulrahman Saleh Khalfan Al-Alawi (Arabic: عبد الرحمن صالح العلاوي; born 8 September 1986), commonly known as Abdulrahman Saleh, is an Omani footballer who plays for Al-Suwaiq Club in Oman Professional League.

== Club career ==
On 27 January 2014, he signed a six-month contract with his former club, Al-Suwaiq Club.

=== Club career statistics ===
| Club | Season | Division | League | | Cup | | Continental (Note: Includes appearances in the AFC Champions League and AFC Cup) | | Other | | Total | |
| Club | Season | Division | Apps | Goals | Apps | Goals | Apps | Goals | Apps | Goals | Apps | Goals |
|---|---|---|---|---|---|---|---|---|---|---|---|---|
| Al-Tali'aa | 2010–11 | Omani League | - | 1 | - | 0 | 0 | 0 | - | 0 | - | 1 |
| Al-Tali'aa | Total | | - | 1 | - | 0 | 0 | 0 | - | 0 | - | 1 |
| Al-Musannah | 2011–12 | Oman Elite League | - | 1 | - | 0 | 0 | 0 | - | 0 | - | 1 |
| Al-Musannah | Total | | - | 1 | - | 0 | 0 | 0 | - | 0 | - | 1 |
| Al-Suwaiq | 2013–14 | Oman Professional League | - | 2 | - | 0 | 4 | 0 | - | 0 | - | 2 |
| Al-Suwaiq | Total | | - | 2 | - | 0 | 4 | 0 | - | 0 | - | 2 |
| Career total | | | - | 4 | - | 0 | 4 | 0 | - | 0 | - | 4 |

== International career ==
Abdulrahman is part of the first team squad of the Oman national football team. He was selected for the national team for the first time in 2009. He made his first appearance for Oman on 11 August 2010 in a friendly match against Kazakhstan. He has made appearances in the 20th Arabian Gulf Cup and the 2014 FIFA World Cup qualification and has represented the national team in the 2011 AFC Asian Cup qualification.

== Honours ==
=== Club ===
- With Al-Suwaiq

- Oman Super Cup (1): 2013
