= Younis Amaan =

Omani footballer

Personal information
- Full name: Younis Amaan Al Naseeb
- Place of birth: Salalah, Oman
- Position: Forward

Senior career*
Years	Team	Apps	(Gls)
–1988	Dhofar		
1988–1995	Mirbat		

International career
–1995	Oman	65	

Managerial career
- Al-Ittihad
- 1996–1997: Al-Hilal
- 1997–1998: Dhofar
- 2004–2005: Al-Ittihad
- 2009–2010: Al-Ittihad
- 2011–2012: Al-Ittihad
- 2013–2014: Al-Ittihad
- Mirbat
- 2016: Salalah
- * Club domestic league appearances and goals

Younis Amaan (Arabic: يونس أمان) is a former Omani football player and coach. He played as a forward, earning 65 caps for the Oman national team and appearing at three Arabian Gulf Cups.

== Club career ==
At the club level, Amaan appeared for Dhofar and Mirbat. He was five times the top scorer of the Oman Professional League, as well as the 1986 Gulf Club Champions Cup. During his seven seasons at Mirbat, Amaan also coached the club's youth teams; during his final two seasons, he served as a player-coach with the senior team.

== International career ==
Amaan earned around 65 caps for the Oman national team and appearing at three Arabian Gulf Cups.

== Coaching career ==
Amaan continued as a coach after his playing retirement, earning his C and B licenses from the Asian Football Confederation. In his first head coaching position, he helped Al-Ittihad earn promotion from the Oman First Division League. After seasons at Al-Hilal and Dhofar, Amaan would spend four more spells in charge of Al-Ittihad, the last of those seeing him take over in midseason and ending in relegation. He took over Salalah at the midpoint of the 2015–16 season with the club sitting on the bottom of the table, but was unable to improve the position as Salalah were relegated.

Outside of coaching, Amaan worked as a studio analyst for Al Jazeera Sport during the 19th Arabian Gulf Cup. He has been a frequent critic of the Oman Football Association and football administration in the country, calling for an increase in the professionalism of the Oman Professional League and critiquing the performances of the national team.
