= Jean-Francois Feupa Mkamwa =

Cameroonian footballer

Frank Parapara
Personal information
- Full name: Jean Francois Feupa Mkamwa
- Date of birth: October 11, 1991 (age 35)
- Place of birth: Foumban, Cameroon
- Height: 1.74 m (5 ft 8 1/2 in)
- Position: Striker

Youth career
- 2007–2009: As Kadey Batouri, Cameroon
- 2010–2011: Levant FC, Batouri, Cameroon

Senior career*
Years	Team	Apps	(Gls)
2012–2013	Al Bashaer Club		(7)
2013	Ahli Sidab Club		(12)
2013–2015	Bahla Club		(22)
2016	Al-Nahda Club		(7)
2017	Al-Nahda Club		(15)
2018	Khor Fakkan		
2017–2018	Al-Orobah FC		
2018–2019	Dhofar Club		
- * Club domestic league appearances and goals

Jean-Francois Feupa Mkamwa, known as Frank Parapara (born October 11, 1991, in Foumban) is a Cameroonian footballer who plays as striker. The bomber, in French "Le Bombardier", was a nickname given by his fans.

== Club career ==
=== Cameroon ===
Parapara started his career in 2007 with AS Kadey of Batouri, a second division club in Cameroon Elite Two, where he provided 10 goals as a starter and was appointed best passer with 12 assists and best scored. The year after he played for Levant FC of Bertoua (Cameroon) a Regional Championship, where he scored 9 goals.

=== Oman Professional League ===
==== Al Bashaer Club ====
In January 2012 he commenced playing in the Al Bashaer Club in Oman where he scored 10 goals.

==== Ahli Sidab Club ====
He joined Ahli Sidab Club with a record of 12 goals scored across 20 matches.

==== Bahla Club ====
Feupa playing for Bahla Club

Feupa moved to Bahla Club in 2014–2015. The club was looking for a player who would assist them in a move to division one. He scored 18 goals in 20 games, and gave the club the OMAN championship Second League Winner as well as being recognised as best scoring and best player. 2014

==== Al Nahda Club ====
Feupa playing for Al Nahda

In January 2016, Parapara joined the Al-Nahda Club (Oman) scoring 22 goals during his time there.

=== Saudi Professional League ===
==== Al-Orobah FC ====
Frank Parapara started the new season with Al-Orobah FC, a professional club in Saudi Arabia.

== International career ==
- In 2012, he was preselected to join the Cameroon Young national team
- In 2014 he was preselected to join the Cameroon national under-23 football team

== Honor ==
- 2007 Best Scored MTN Elite Two with 10 goals
- 2015 Best scored OMAN championship Second League with 18 goals
- 2016 Best scored OMAN championship Premier League with 15 goals
- 2015 OMAN championship Second League Winner
- 2017 OMAN Oman Professional League Cup winner
- 2017 OMAN Oman First Division League Best scored with 14 Goals
