= 2015–16 Oman First Division League =

Oman First Division League
- Season: 2015–16
- Champions: Al-Rustaq
- Relegated: Ahli Sidab; Al-Wahda
- Matches played: 114
- Goals scored: 261 (2.29 per match)
- Biggest home win: Bahla 5-1 Al-Wahda (21 January 2016)
- Biggest away win: Al-Rustaq 0-5 Nizwa (19 November 2015)
- Highest scoring: Bahla 5-1 Al-Wahda (21 January 2016)
- Longest winning run: Nizwa (6 games)
- Longest unbeaten run: Nizwa (10 games)
- Longest losing run: Al-Kamel Wa Al-Wafi; Nizwa (4 games)

The 2015-16 Oman First Division League (known as the Omantel First Division League for sponsorship reasons) was the 40th edition of the second-highest division overall football league in Oman. The season began on 1 October 2015 and concluded on 22 April 2016. Muscat Club are the defending champions, having won their first title in the previous 2014–15 season. At the end of the 9th round in the play-offs, on Friday, 15 April 2016, Al-Rustaq SC were crowned the champions of the 2015–16 Oman First Division League with one game to spare after a 1-0 win over Bowsher Club winning their first ever domestic title and hence earning promotion to the top flight for the first time in the club's history.. Al-Rustaq SC along with Oman Club and Ja'lan SC earned promotion to 2016–17 Oman Professional League.

== Group A ==
Pos	Team	Pld	W	D	L	GF	GA	GD	Pts	Qualification or relegation
1	Nizwa	12	7	4	1	17	5	+12	25	Qualification to play-offs
2	Al-Rustaq	12	7	2	3	16	11	+5	23	Qualification to play-offs
3	Bowsher	12	6	4	2	15	9	+6	22	Qualification to play-offs
4	Mirbat	12	6	2	4	16	13	+3	20	
5	Al-Tali'aa	12	2	4	6	9	12	−3	10	
6	Al-Kamel Wa Al-Wafi	12	2	2	8	12	21	−9	8	
7	Ahli Sidab	12	2	2	8	9	23	−14	8	Relegation to 2016–17 Oman Second Division League

Updated to match(es) played on 21 January 2016. Source:
Rules for classification: 1) points; 2) goal difference; 3) number of goals scored.

=== Results ===
Home \ Away	AHS	ALK	ALR	ALT	BOW	MIR	NIZ
Ahli Sidab		2–1	0–4	0–2	1–2	1–2	3–2
Al-Kamel Wa Al-Wafi	3–0		0–3	2–1	2–3	0–2	0–1
Al-Rustaq	1–0	2–0		1–1	0–1	2–0	0–5
Al-Tali'aa	1–1	2–1	1–2		0–0	1–2	0–0
Bowsher	2–0	1–1	3–0	1–0		1–1	0–1
Mirbat	1–1	3–1	0–1	1–0	3–1		1–2
Nizwa	2–0	1–1	0–0	1–0	0–0	2–0	

Updated to match(es) played on 21 January 2016. Source:
Legend: Blue = home team win; Yellow = draw; Red = away team win.

=== Clubs season-progress ===
Win
Draw
Lose

Team ╲ Round	1	2	3	4	5	6	7	8	9	10	11	12
Ahli Sidab	L	L	D	W	L	L	L	D	L	L	W	L
Al-Kamel Wa Al-Wafi	L	D	L	L	L	L	D	L	L	W	L	W
Al-Rustaq	W	W	W	L	W	L	W	D	W	L	W	D
Al-Tali'aa	L	L	D	L	D	W	L	D	W	D	L	L
Bowsher	W	L	W	D	D	W	D	D	W	W	L	W
Mirbat	W	W	L	W	L	D	W	D	L	W	L	W
Nizwa	D	W	W	W	W	W	W	D	D	W	L	D

Updated to match(es) played on 21 January 2016. Source: Clubs Season-Progress

== Group B ==
Pos	Team	Pld	W	D	L	GF	GA	GD	Pts	Qualification or relegation
1	Ja'lan	12	7	2	3	16	5	+11	23	Qualification to play-offs
2	Oman	12	7	2	3	16	11	+5	23	Qualification to play-offs
3	Al-Seeb	12	5	5	2	18	13	+5	20	Qualification to play-offs
4	Al-Ittihad	12	4	2	6	14	17	−3	14	
5	Bahla	12	3	4	5	15	15	0	13	
6	Al-Mudhaibi	12	2	7	3	15	18	−3	13	
7	Al-Wahda	12	1	4	7	7	22	−15	7	Relegation to 2016–17 Oman Second Division League

Updated to match(es) played on 21 January 2016. Source:
Rules for classification: 1) points; 2) goal difference; 3) number of goals scored.

=== Results ===
Home \ Away	ALI	ALM	ALS	ALW	BAH	JAL	OMA
Al-Ittihad		1–1	0–1	3–0	1–3	1–0	0–1
Al-Mudhaibi	2–3		2–2	2–2	1–1	1–0	2–1
Al-Seeb	4–2	2–2		2–0	2–1	0–0	1–1
Al-Wahda	0–2	0–0	1–1		1–1	0–2	2–1
Bahla	0–0	2–1	1–3	5–1		0–2	1–1
Ja'lan	3–0	1–1	2–0	1–0	2–0		1–2
Oman	2–1	3–0	1–0	2–1	1–0	0–2	

Updated to match(es) played on 21 January 2016. Source:
Legend: Blue = home team win; Yellow = draw; Red = away team win.

=== Clubs season-progress ===
Win
Draw
Lose

Team ╲ Round	1	2	3	4	5	6	7	8	9	10	11	12
Al-Ittihad	L	W	L	W	D	D	L	W	L	L	L	W
Al-Mudhaibi	D	D	D	L	D	D	L	W	D	W	D	L
Al-Seeb	W	D	D	W	D	D	W	L	W	W	D	L
Al-Wahda	L	L	D	D	L	D	W	L	L	D	L	L
Bahla	L	D	D	L	D	D	L	W	L	L	W	W
Ja'lan	W	D	L	W	L	D	W	L	W	W	W	W
Oman	W	D	W	D	W	W	L	W	W	W	L	L

Updated to match(es) played on 21 January 2016. Source: Clubs Season-Progress

== Play-offs ==
=== Format ===
3 top teams each from Group A and Group B advanced to the play-offs stage. Each team in the play-offs stage plays a home and an away tie against the remaining 5 teams. The winners and the runners-up earn promotion to 2016-17 Oman Professional League and the second runners-up plays a promotion play-off against the 12th positioned team of the 2015–16 Oman Professional League.

=== Table ===
Pos	Team	Pld	W	D	L	GF	GA	GD	Pts	Promotion or qualification
1	Al-Rustaq	10	5	4	1	10	7	+3	19	Promotion To 2016-17 Oman Professional League
2	Oman	10	5	3	2	14	7	+7	18	Promotion To 2016-17 Oman Professional League
3	Ja'lan	10	5	2	3	14	10	+4	17	Promotion play-off
4	Bowsher	10	3	2	5	14	14	0	11	
5	Al-Seeb	10	2	3	5	7	14	−7	9	
6	Nizwa	10	2	2	6	7	14	−7	8	

Updated to match(es) played on 22 April 2016. Source:
Rules for classification: 1) points; 2) goal difference; 3) number of goals scored.

=== Results ===
Home \ Away	ALR	ALS	BOW	JAL	NIZ	OMA
Al-Rustaq		0–0	1–0	1–1	1–0	1–0
Al-Seeb	0–1		0–3	1–3	1–1	1–0
Bowsher	1–1	2–2		3–0	4–1	0–2
Ja'lan	4–1	2–0	2–0		1–0	0–1
Nizwa	0–2	0–1	2–0	2–0		1–4
Oman	1–1	2–1	3–1	1–1	0–0	

Updated to match(es) played on 22 April 2016. Source:
Legend: Blue = home team win; Yellow = draw; Red = away team win.

On 20 February 2016, due to pitch invasion, the match between Al-Seeb Club and Bowsher Club was abandoned after second half with Bowsher leading 2-0; Oman Football Association on 25 February confirmed the result as 3-0 for Bowsher and also announced a 500 Omani rials fine on Al-Seeb.

=== Clubs play-offs-progress ===
Win
Draw
Lose

Team ╲ Round	1	2	3	4	5	6	7	8	9	10
Al-Rustaq	W	D	W	D	D	D	W	W	W	L
Al-Seeb	D	D	L	W	L	W	L	D	L	L
Bowsher	L	L	D	L	W	W	L	D	L	W
Ja'lan	W	L	L	W	D	L	W	D	W	W
Nizwa	D	W	L	D	W	L	L	L	L	L
Oman	L	W	W	D	L	D	W	D	W	W

Updated to match(es) played on 22 April 2016. Source: Clubs play-offs-Progress

== Promotion/relegation play-off ==
As of 2 May 2016

=== 1st leg ===
28 April 2016
19:00 UTC+4

Al-Musannah	1 - 1	Ja'lan
Jajani Baba 23'		Khalid Al-Buraiki 75'

Al-Seeb Stadium, Al-Seeb, Oman
Attendance: Qasim Al-Hatmi (Oman)

=== 2nd leg ===
2 May 2016
19:00 UTC+4

Ja'lan	2 - 1	Al-Musannah
Ibrahima Camara 21', 93'		Al-Ghassani 28'

Sur Sports Complex, Sur, Oman
Referee: Yaqoob Abdul-Baqi (Oman)

Ja'lan earned promotion to 2016–17 Oman Professional League after winning 3-2 on aggregate.

== OFA Awards ==
Oman Football Association awarded the following awards for the 2015–16 Oman First Division League season.

- Top Scorer: Shawqi Al-Ruqadi (Bowsher)
- Best Player: Essam Al-Barahi (Al-Rustaq)
- Best Goalkeeper: Mohammed Al-Busaidi (Oman)
- Best Coach: Mustafa Suwaib (Al-Rustaq)
- Best Team Manager: Jasim Al-Hasani (Ja'lan)
- Fair Play Award: Al-Seeb Club

== See also ==
- 2015–16 Oman Professional League
- 2015–16 Oman Second Division League
- 2015–16 Sultan Qaboos Cup
