= 2013 Oman Super Cup =

Fanja	Al-Suwaiq
1	2
- Date: 31 August 2013
- Venue: Al-Seeb Stadium, Al-Seeb, Oman

The 2013 Oman Super Cup was the 11th edition of the Oman Super Cup, an annual football match between Al-Suwaiq Club, the champions of the 2012–13 Oman Elite League and the 2012–13 Sultan Qaboos Cup and Fanja SC, the runners-up of the 2012–13 Oman Elite League. The match was played at the Al-Seeb Stadium in Al-Seeb, Oman.

== Match details ==
31 August 2013
19:30 (UTC+4)

Fanja	1–2	Al-Suwaiq
Al-Maashari 43'		Al-Alawi 57'; Al-Mukhaini 75'

Al-Seeb Stadium, Al-Seeb, Oman
