= 2012 Oman Super Cup =

| Fanja | Dhofar |
| 1 | 0 |
- Date: 29 August 2012
- Venue: Royal Oman Police Stadium, Muscat, Oman

The 2012 Oman Super Cup was the tenth edition of the Oman Super Cup, an annual soccer match between the previous season's champions of the Oman Professional League and the champions of the Sultan Qaboos Cup. In 2012, Fanja SC, the champion of the 2011-12 Oman Professional League, played Dhofar S.C.S.C., the champion of the 2011 Sultan Qaboos Cup. The match was played at the Royal Oman Police Stadium in Muscat, Oman, on 29 August 2012, with Fanja winning 1-0.

== Match details ==
29 August 2012
19:15 (UTC+4)

| Fanja | 1–0 | Dhofar |
|---|---|---|
| | | Al-Mushaifri 53' |

Royal Oman Police Stadium, Muscat, Oman
