= Mohammed Al-Rawahi =

Omani footballer (born 1993)

Personal information
- Full name: Mohammed Faraj Abdullah Al-Rawahi
- Date of birth: 26 April 1993 (age 33)
- Place of birth: Muscat, Oman
- Height: 1.88 m (6 ft 2 in)
- Position: Centre-back

Team information
- Current team: Oman
- Number: 3

Youth career
- 2008–2010: Samail
- 2010–2012: Al-Seeb

Senior career*
Years	Team	Apps	(Gls)
2012–2013	Al-Seeb	?	(1)
2013–2015	Dhofar	?	(1)
2015–2016	Al-Nahda	?	(7)
2016–2017	Girona B	22	(3)
2017–2018	Al-Nahda	24	(1)
2018–2019	Al-Wakrah	16	(0)
2019–2020	Al-Shamal	16	(2)
2020-	Oman	14	(2)

International career
	Oman U-17	?	(?)
2014	Oman U-23	?	(0)
2016–	Oman	15	(0)
- * Club domestic league appearances and goals

Mohammed Faraj Abdullah Al-Rawahi (Arabic: محمد بن فرج الرواحي; born 26 April 1993), commonly known as Mohammed Faraj, is an Omani professional footballer who plays for Al-Nahda Club in the Oman Professional League. He has also played for the Oman national team.

== Club career ==
Al-Rawahi played for Samail Club from 2008 to 2010 in the first division league of Oman Football Association. In 2010, he signed a contract with Al-Seeb Club and played with them for two consecutive seasons. On 18 July 2013, he signed a two-years contract with Dhofar.

On 6 July 2015, he signed a one-year contract with Al-Buraimi-based Al-Nahda Club. In the 2015–16 Oman Professional League, Mohammed came into the limelight soon after scoring a wonder goal on 26 December 2015 in a 2–3 loss against Dhofar.

On 2 September 2016, Al-Rawahi signed a one-year contract with Spanish side Girona FC B. He made his club debut on 6 November 2016, in a 2–1 loss against UE Vic. He scored his first goal on 18 January 2017, in a 2–2 draw against Unió Atlètica d'Horta. He scored three goals in 22 appearances in the Primera Catalana throughout the 2016–17 season.

After a successful stint in Spain, he moved back to Oman and signed a one-year contract with his former club, Al-Nahda.

== International career ==
Al-Rawahi has represented the Oman senior national team, having won his first cap on 24 March 2016, in a 2018 FIFA World Cup Qualification match against Guam.

He has also represented Oman at both the U-17 and U-23 levels. He made four appearances in the inaugural AFC U-22 Championship in 2013.

== Personal life ==
Al-Rawahi's younger brother, Ahmed, is also a footballer, and plays as a goalkeeper.
