= Cédric Tchoumbé =

Cameroonian footballer (born 1987)

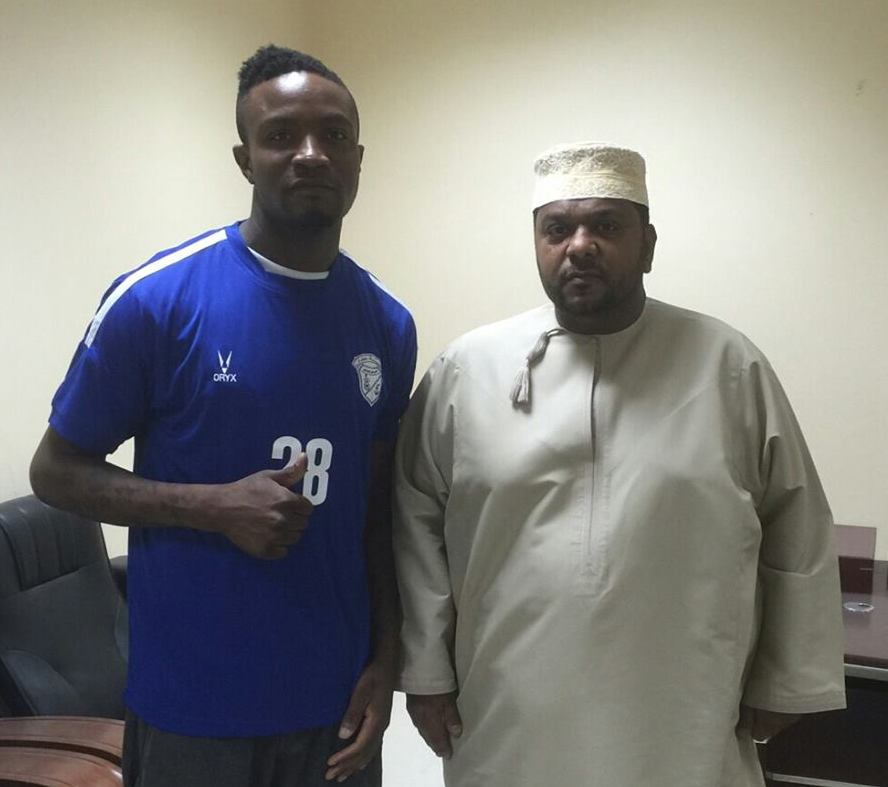
- Tchoumbé (left) in 2015

Personal information
- Full name: Cédric Leandre Tchoumbé Fankam
- Date of birth: 28 March 1987 (age 39)
- Place of birth: Douala, Cameroon
- Height: 1.86 m (6 ft 1 in)
- Position: Striker

Youth career
- 2001–2004: Racing Club
- 2004–2005: U.S.D. Forte dei Marmi
- 2005–2006: La Masia

Senior career*
Years	Team	Apps	(Gls)
2006–2007	FC Oberneuland	14	(4)
2007–2008	R. White Star Bruxelles	12	(4)
2008–2010	Giana Erminio	15	(7)
2010–2011	Louhans-Cuiseaux	12	(8)
2011	Schötz	15	(5)
2011–2014	Espinho	12	(5)
2014	Feirense	4	(1)
2015–2016	Sur	9	(4)
2017–2018	That Ras	10	(4)
2018–2019	Abha		
- * Club domestic league appearances and goals

Cédric Leandre Tchoumbé Fankam (born 28 March 1987), commonly known as Cédric Tchoumbé, is a Cameroonian footballer who plays as a striker.
