= Badar Al-Alawi =

Omani footballer (born 1990)

Personal information
- Full name: Badar Ali Rashid Ali Al Alawi
- Date of birth: 12 August 1990 (age 36)
- Place of birth: Oman
- Height: 1.85 m (6 ft 1 in)
- Positions: Winger; forward

Team information
- Current team: Terengganu
- Number: 7

Senior career*
Years	Team	Apps	(Gls)
- Yanqul SC
- Al Nahda
2018	Kamphaeng Phet		
2019	Bangkok		
2020	Ranong		
2021	Khon Kaen		
2021–2022	Chainat	25	(10)
2022–2023	Krabi	34	(14)
2023–2024	Pattaya United	0	(0)
2024–	Terengganu		
- * Club domestic league appearances and goals

Badar Ali Rashid Ali Al Alawi (Arabic: بدر العلوي; born 12 August 1990) is an Omani footballer who plays as a winger or attacker for Malaysia Super League club Terengganu.

== Career ==
Al-Alawi started his career with Omani lower league side Yanqul SC. After that, he signed for Al Nahda in the Omani top flight after receiving interest from Spain and suffering a broken leg. Before the 2018 season, Al-Alawi signed for Kamphaeng Phet in the Thai third tier after playing in Malaysia and Hong Kong. Before the 2019 season, he signed for Thai third tier club Bangkok FC.

In 2020, he signed for Ranong in the Thai second tier. Before the second half of 2020–21, Al-Alawi signed for Thai second tier team Khon Kaen. In 2021, he signed for Chainat in Thailand. In 2022, he signed for Thai outfit Krabi FC.
