= Hamada Al-Zubairi =

Yemeni footballer

Personal information
- Full name: Hamada Ahmed Mohammed Al-Zubairi
- Date of birth: 1 June 1990 (age 36)
- Place of birth: Sana'a, Yemen
- Position: Centre-back

Youth career
- Al Yarmuk Al Rawda

Senior career*
Years	Team	Apps	(Gls)
–2016	Al-Ahli San'a'		
2016	Saham Club		
2016–	Al-Ahli San'a'		

International career
2009–	Yemen	32	(0)
- * Club domestic league appearances and goals

Hamada Al-Zubairi (Arabic: حمادة الزبيري; born 1 June 1990) is a Yemeni footballer who plays for Al-Ahli San'a' and the Yemen national football team.

== Career ==
=== Oman ===
Officially securing a move to Saham Club of the Oman Professional League in early 2016 with his contract lasting until 10 May that year, Al-Zubairi assisted his team in their 2015–16 Sultan Qaboos Cup run, winning the final 1–0. Before that, he was linked to four clubs.

=== International ===
The captain of the Yemen national team lists the game against Iraq as the peak of his international career.
