= Samir Chammam =

Tunisian football manager

Managerial career
- Years: Team
- Espérance (assistant)
- 2008–2010: East Riffa Club
- 2012–2013: Al-Muharraq SC
- 2013–2015: Manama Club
- 2015: Dhofar
- 2017: Bahrain U20
- 2018–2020: Bahrain U23

Samir Chammam is a Tunisian football manager.
