= Faiz Al-Rushaidi =

Omani footballer (born 1988)

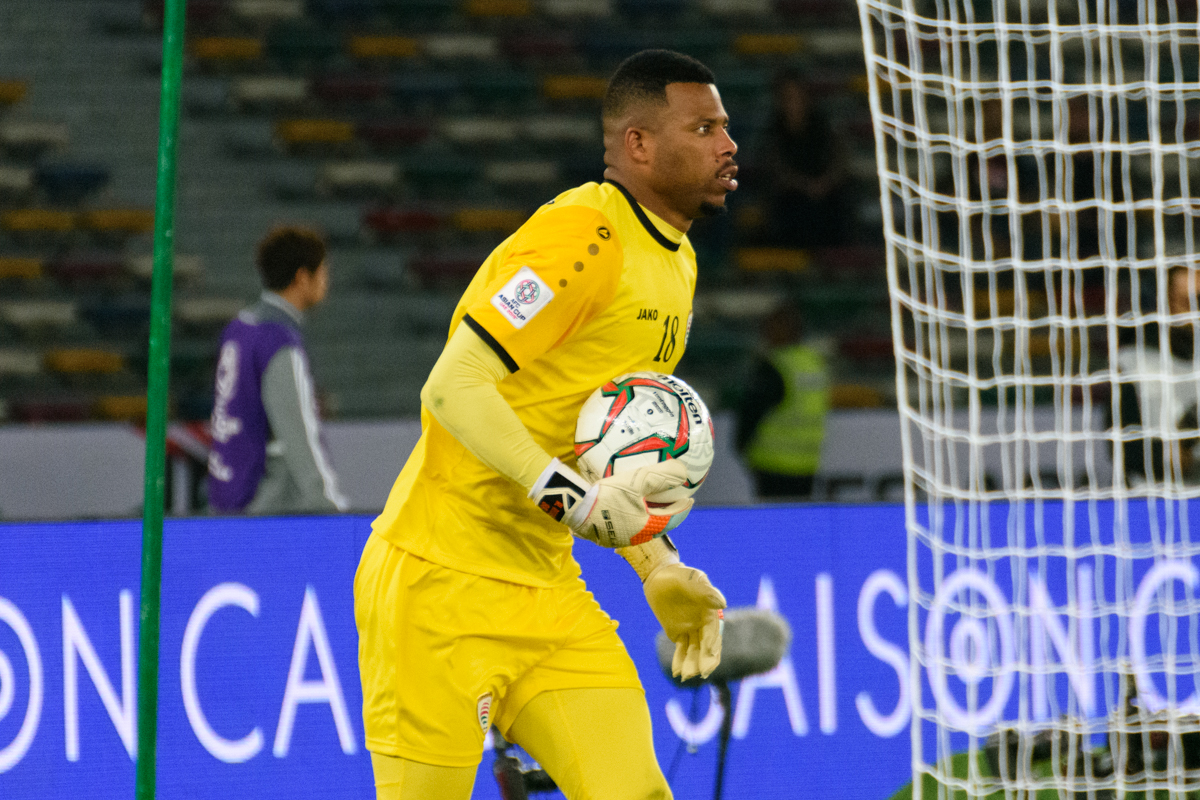
- Al-Rushaidi playing for Oman at the 2019 AFC Asian Cup.

Personal information
- Full name: Faiz Issa-Khadoom Al-Rushaidi
- Date of birth: 19 July 1988 (age 38)
- Place of birth: Al-Rustaq, Oman
- Height: 1.85 m (6 ft 1 in)
- Position: Goalkeeper

Team information
- Current team: Al-Nahda

Youth career
- 2004–2006: Al-Suwaiq

Senior career*
Years	Team	Apps	(Gls)
2006–2014	Al-Suwaiq		(0)
2014–2015	Saham		(0)
2015–2017	Al-Nasr		(0)
2017–2018	Al-Suwaiq		(0)
2018–2019	Al-Ain	25	(0)
2019–2021	Dhofar		(0)
2021–2022	Mes Rafsanjan	13	(0)
2022–2023	Al-Suwaiq		(0)
2023–2025	Dhofar		(0)
2025–	Al-Nahda		(0)

International career
2010–	Oman	79	(0)
Medal record
Men's football
Representing Oman
Gulf Cup
Runner-up	2024 Kuwait
- * Club domestic league appearances and goals

Faiz Issa-Khadoom Al-Rushaidi (Arabic: فايز بن عيسى الرشيدي; born 19 July 1988) is an Omani footballer who plays as a goalkeeper for Al-Nahda in the Oman Professional League and the Oman national team.

== Club career ==
On 3 June 2014, Faiz joined 2014 GCC Champions League runners-up Saham SC. On 9 September 2021, he signed for Iranian side Mes Rafsanjan.

=== Club career statistics ===
Club	Season	Division	League		Cup		Continental (Note: Includes appearances in the AFC Champions League and AFC Cup)		Other		Total	
Club	Season	Division	Apps	Goals	Apps	Goals	Apps	Goals	Apps	Goals	Apps	Goals
Al-Suwaiq	2010–11	Oman Professional League	-	0	-	0	6	0	-	0	-	0
Al-Suwaiq	2011–12	Oman Professional League	-	0	-	0	7	0	-	0	-	0
Al-Suwaiq	2013–14	Oman Professional League	-	0	-	0	7	0	-	0	-	0
Al-Suwaiq	Total		-	0	-	0	20	0	0	0	-	0
Career total			-	0	-	0	20	0	-	0	-	0

== International career ==
Faiz is part of the first team squad of the Oman national football team. He was selected for the national team for the first time in 2010. He made his first appearance for Oman on 15 August 2012 in a friendly match against Egypt. He has made appearances in the 2012 WAFF Championship, the 2014 FIFA World Cup qualification and the 2015 AFC Asian Cup qualification and has represented the national team in the 20th Arabian Gulf Cup and the 21st Arabian Gulf Cup. He produced an outstanding performance against the UAE, saving two penalty shots from Omar Abdulrahman, winning the 23rd Arabian Gulf Cup.

He was selected for the 2019 AFC Asian Cup for Oman, but he initially served as second-choice goalkeeper to Ali Al-Habsi. However, Al-Habsi suffered an injury and was left out, thus he became the team's first choice goalkeeper and made appearances in the 4 games Oman played as Oman managed to reach the knockout stage for the first time.

== Honours ==
Al-Suwaiq

- Oman Elite League: 2009–10, 2010–11, 2012–13
- Sultan Qaboos Cup: 2008, 2012
- Oman Super Cup: 2013; runner-up: 2009, 2010, 2011

Oman

- Arabian Gulf Cup: 2017–18

Individual

- Oman Elite League Best Goalkeeper: 2012–13, 2013–14
