= Kim Gwi-hyeon =

South Korean footballer

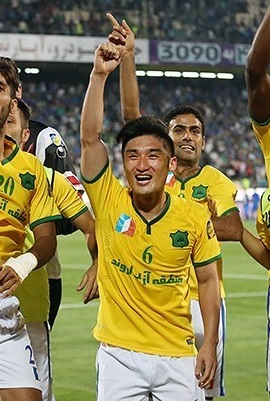
- Gwi-hyeon playing for Sanat Naft in 2016

Personal information
- Date of birth: January 4, 1990 (age 36)
- Place of birth: South Korea
- Height: 1.70 m (5 ft 7 in)
- Position: Midfielder

Team information
- Current team: Krabi
- Number: 46

Youth career
- 2005–2010: Vélez Sársfield

Senior career*
Years	Team	Apps	(Gls)
2011–2012	Vélez Sársfield B	14	(1)
2011–2012	Vélez Sársfield	0	(0)
2013–2014	Daegu	18	(1)
2015	Gyeongju Citizen	0	(0)
2015–2016	Al-Nasr	30	(1)
2016–2017	Sanat Naft Abadan	21	(0)
2017	Al Ahli SC	1	(0)
2018–	Krabi	11	(1)

International career^{‡}
2011	South Korea U23	1	(0)
- * Club domestic league appearances and goals as of 15 April 2017 ‡ National team caps and goals as of 1 February 2012

- Kim Gwi-hyeon
- Hangul: 김귀현
- Hanja: 金貴鉉
- RR: Gim Gwihyeon
- MR: Kim Kwihyŏn

Kim Gwi-hyeon (Korean: 김귀현; born January 4, 1990) is a South Korean footballer.

He was a member of Club Atlético Vélez Sársfield academy, and played for Argentine Primera División side Club Atlético Vélez Sársfield.
