= Sulaiman Al-Mazroui =

Omani footballer (born 1972)

Personal information
- Full name: Sulaiman Khamis Humaid Al-Mazroui
- Date of birth: 13 September 1972 (age 54)
- Place of birth: Oman
- Height: 1.81 m (5 ft 11 in)
- Position: Goalkeeper

Senior career*
Years	Team	Apps	(Gls)
1992–2009	Muscat		

International career
1993–2009	Oman	45	(0)
- * Club domestic league appearances and goals

Sulaiman Khamis Humaid Al-Mazroui (Arabic: سليمان خميس حميد المزروعي; born 13 September 1972), commonly known as Sulaiman Al-Mazroui, is an Omani former footballer who played as a goalkeeper. He played his entire club career for Muscat Club. He is also currently the longest serving player of the national team for a total of 15 years of representing Oman. Although he was a goalkeeper, in the early part of his career he was an outfield player. He was also the captain of the national team.

== International career ==
Sulaiman was part of the first team squad of the Oman national football team till 2007. He has made appearances in the 2002 FIFA World Cup qualification and the 2007 AFC Asian Cup qualification and has represented the national team in the 2006 FIFA World Cup qualification and the 2007 AFC Asian Cup.
