= 2015 Oman Super Cup =

Al-Oruba	Fanja
0	3
- Fanja were declared the winners as Al-Oruba pulled out.
- Date: 21 August 2015
- Venue: Sultan Qaboos Sports Complex, Muscat, Oman

The 2015 Oman Super Cup was the 13th edition of the Oman Super Cup, an annual football match between Al-Oruba SC, the champions of the 2014-15 Oman Professional League and the 2014-15 Sultan Qaboos Cup and Fanja SC, the runners-up of the 2014-15 Oman Professional League. The match was played at the Sultan Qaboos Sports Complex in Muscat, Oman.

On 19 August 2015, the defending Oman Professional League and Sultan Qaboos Cup champions, Al-Oruba SC decided to pull out of the 2015 Oman Super Cup citing non-payment of dues by the Oman Football Association and a late release of its players from national and army team camps as the main reasons behind the club's decision to pull out. On 21 August 2015, Fanja was declared the winner of the Super Cup after its opponent, Al-Oruba, as expected failed to turn up for the match.

== Match details ==
21 August 2015
19:30 (UTC+4)

Al-Oruba	0–3	Fanja

Sultan Qaboos Sports Complex, Muscat, Oman

== Aftermath ==
On 6 September 2015, the defending champions were punished by the OFA's disciplinary committee for failing to turn up against Fanja in the 2015 Oman Super Cup. The defending champions of both the Oman Professional League and the Sultan Qaboos Cup were fined a sum of Omani Rial 500 and the committee decided that the club will play their first five 2015–16 Oman Professional League fixtures away from home.
