= Ihsan Barakat =

Jordanian jurist (born 1964)

Attorney General
- Incumbent
- Assumed office December 2010

Ihsan Zuhdi Barakat (born 1964) is a Jordanian jurist who was the country's first female Attorney General and the first woman appointed to the country's Supreme Court in 2017.

== Early life and education ==
Barakat's mother was a teacher. She graduated from the University of Jordan in 1986.

== Career ==
Barakat set up her own law firm in 1988, attracting high profile clients including the Central Bank of Jordan. She was appointed as a judge in 2002 at the Court of First Instance in Amman and transferred to the Appeals Court in 2004. She also served as director of the Directorate of International Relations at the Ministry of Justice for nine months in 2004-2005.

Barakat was a judicial inspector and a judge at the Amman Court of Appeal. In May 2007, she was appointed to the position of Chief of Court of the Court of First Instance in West Amman, the first woman to hold such a position. Barakat was a founding member and president of the Arab Women's Legal Network, which was formed in 2005 with the backing of Queen Rania. She is a member of the Executive Board of the Jordanian National Commission for Women and the Higher Council of the Jordanian National Forum for Women.

In December 2010, Barakat was appointed as the country's first female Attorney General, supervising sixty district attorneys, including only one other woman, and representing the government in the court of appeals. At the time she said, "The position will put to a test women's capabilities ... Some of my peers were angered by my appointment."

Barakat was appointed to the Supreme Court in September 2017, making her the first woman to reach the highest position in the country's judiciary. In January 2018, she was appointed as a judge in the Cassation Court, the judicial authority over all Jordanian courts. At the same time, Prime Minister Hani Mulki issued a circular to all ministries and institutions to ensure gender equality in vacant positions.

== Personal life ==
Barakat has two daughters, both have graduated law in London.
