= Manuel Ramos (football manager) =

Portuguese football manager

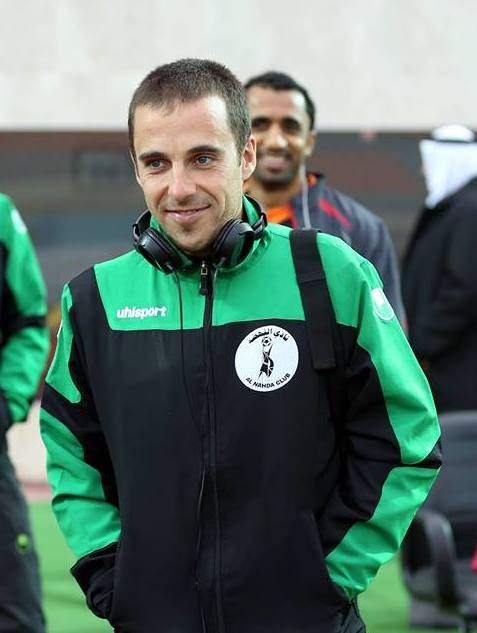
- Manuel Ramos, Portuguese manager

Personal information
- Full name: Manuel José Alves Ramos
- Date of birth: 10 February 1982 (age 44)
- Place of birth: Esmoriz, Portugal
- Height: 1.70 m (5 ft 7 in)
- Position: Attacking midfielder

Team information
- Current team: Dhofar (manager)

Managerial career
- Years: Team
- 2003–2004: Esmoriz U11
- 2004–2005: Esmoriz U13
- 2005–2006: Sanjoanense U12
- 2006–2007: Sanjoanense (assistant)
- 2006–2008: Sanjoanense (scouting coordinator)
- 2007–2008: Sanjoanense U13
- 2008–2009: Sanjoanense U15
- 2009–2011: Sanjoanense U19
- 2010–2011: Sanjoanense (assistant)
- 2010–2012: Porto (scouting coordinator)
- 2011–2012: Sanjoanense
- 2012–2014: Al-Nahda (assistant, fitness coach)
- 2014–2016: Oman U-23 (assistant, fitness coach)
- 2016: Fanja
- 2017–: Dhofar

Manuel José Alves Ramos commonly known as Manuel Ramos or Nené (born 10 February 1982) is a Portuguese football manager who is the current manager of Dhofar S.C.S.C. of Oman Professional League.

== Managerial career ==
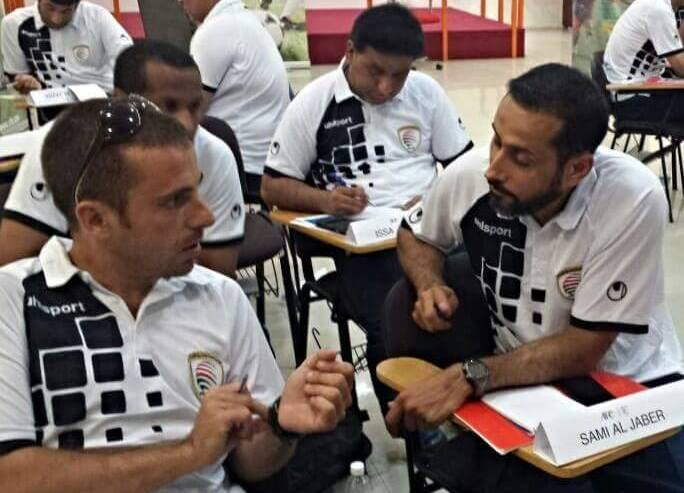
Manuel Ramos - Sami Al-Jaber

Manuel holds the AFC A coaching license. He received the AFC A coaching license in 2015 from the Asian Football Confederation in coordination with the Oman Football Association. He also holds the UEFA B coaching license and the FPF (Portuguese Football Federation) C(II level) license from the Portuguese Football Federation. He is a graduate in Sports and Physical Education from the Faculdade de Desporto da Universidade do Porto (FADEUP). He holds a Level II certificate of coaching and a certificate of orientation and conduction of exercises and sports activities from the Instituto do Desporto e Juventude (IDP). Being one of the best participants in most of the courses he has attended, the Portuguese is highly renown for his analysis of game, both the offensive and defensive phase of the game.

=== Esmoriz ===
Manuel began his managerial career in 2003 with his hometown, Esmoriz-based side, S.C. Esmoriz. He worked for a span of three years with the U-11 and U-13 squads of the Esmoriz-based club.

=== Sanjoanense ===
Later in 2005, he moved to São João da Madeira where he was appointed as the head coach of the U-12 side of A.D. Sanjoanense. Impressed with his performances with the junior side he was then promoted as the assistant manager of the first team squad of the club in 2006 where he worked under Jorge Castelo. During this time he also played the role of a scouting coordinator for the club till 2008. In 2007, he was appointed as the head coach of the U-13 side, helping them win the Aveiro district championship. Impressed with his achievements, he was then promoted as the head coach of the U-15 side which participated in the Campeonato Nacional de Juniores C, helping his side qualify for the second stage of the championship for the first time in the club's history. In 2009, he began working as the head coach of the U-19 side which participated in the Campeonato Nacional de Juniores A. In the 2010–11 season, he also worked as an assistant to José Brito of the first team of the club helping them win the championship and super cup in the particular season. In the meantime, he began working as a scouting coordinator for Portuguese club FC Porto in Aveiro region. Impressed with his six-year long work with various junior sides and as an assistant, the São João da Madeira-based side appointed the young Portuguese as the head coach of the first team side for the 2011–12 season.

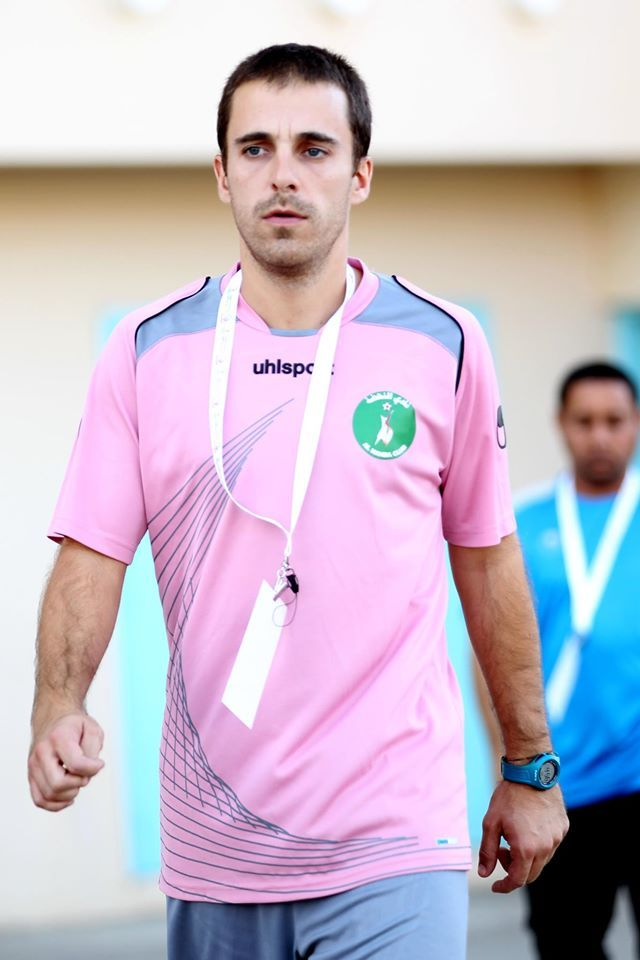
Manuel Ramos - Al-Nahda Club

=== Al-Nahda ===
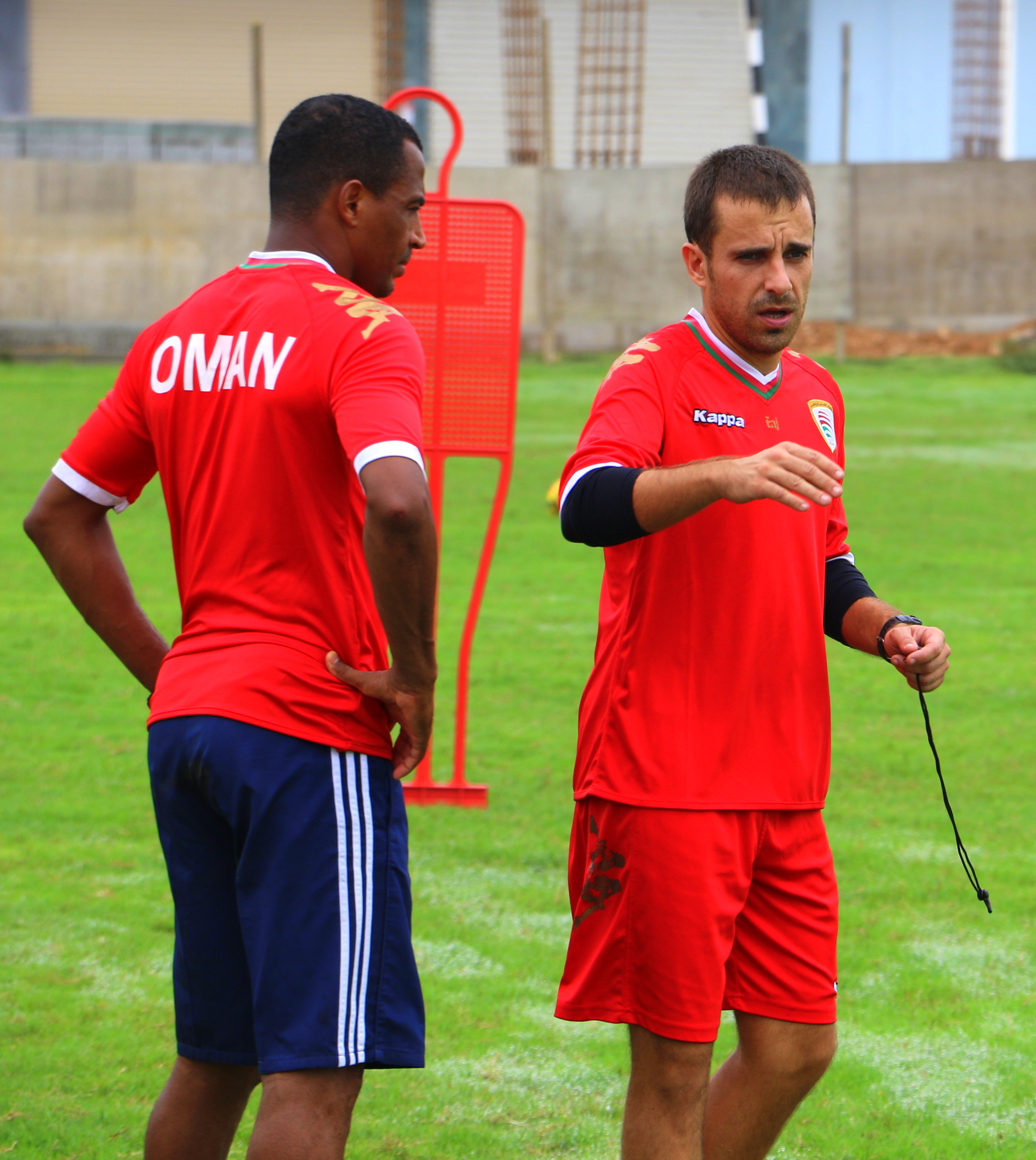
Manuel Ramos - Oman U-23

He first moved out of Portugal in 2012 to the Middle East and more accurately to Oman where he was appointed as the assistant manager (assistant to Hamad Al-Azani) of Oman Professional League side, Al-Nahda Club. He helped the Al-Buraimi-based side achieve the runners-up position in the most prestigious tournament of the nation, Sultan Qaboos Cup in 2012-13 and 2013-14. He also helped his side become the winners of the inaugural Oman Professional League in 2013–14 Sultan Qaboos Cup. Participating in the 2014 GCC Champions League, he helped his side qualify for the Semi-finals of the competition where the Omani club lost 3–2 on aggregate to Emirati club Al-Nasr SC.

=== Oman U-23 ===
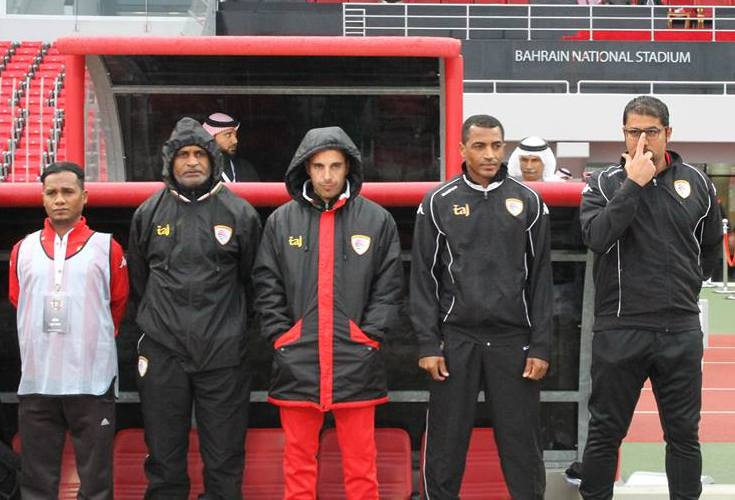
Manuel Ramos - Oman U-23

On 25 May 2014, along with his former head coach, Hamad Al-Azani he signed a two-year contract with Oman Football Association to be appointed as the assistant manager of Oman national under-23 football team. He helped the U-23 side secure the 3rd position in the 2015 GCC U-23 Championship winning 2–1 win over UAE U-23. He also helped his side secure the 2nd position in the 2016 AFC U-23 Championship qualification which was played in Muscat, Oman.

=== Fanja ===
On 18 July 2016, he was appointed as the manager of 2015–16 Oman Professional League champions, Fanja SC. He made his Oman Professional League debut as the manager of the defending champions on 17 September 2016 in a 3–1 win over newly promoted side, Ja'alan SC. However, a disappointing run in the league Fanja's management decided to part company with the Portuguese.

=== Dhofar ===
On 1 January 2017, he was appointed as the manager of Dhofar S.C.S.C.

== Achievements as manager ==
=== Honors ===
- With Sanjoanense U-15
- Campeonato Distrital de Aveiro Infantis A (1):

- Winners 2008

- With Sanjoanense
- Campeonato Distrital de Aveiro da I Divisão (1):

- Winners 2011

- Supertaça de Aveiro (1):

- Winners 2011

- With Al-Nahda (Assistant)
- Oman Professional League (1):

- Winners 2013–14 Oman Professional League

- Sultan Qaboos Cup (0):

- Runners-up 2012-13, 2013-14
