= Ghaleb Barakat =

Jordanian politician (1927–2014)

Ghaleb Barakat (Arabic: غالب بركات; 20 September 1927 – 6 August 2014) was a Jordanian politician and diplomat. He served as Minister of Tourism and Antiquities between 1967 and 1972 and was later posted as a diplomat to several United Nations institutions and agencies.

== Career ==
Barakat was born in Jaffa, Mandatory Palestine in 1927 to Zaki and Fatima Barakat. He went to the Bishop Gobat School in Jerusalem. He studied economics and trade at the American University of Beirut in Lebanon, graduating with honours in 1949.

He started his career by working as press attaché at the Tourism Department in 1952. After two years he became tourisme attaché at the Jordanian embassy in Rome, Italy. In 1960 he returned to Jordan to become Director-General of the Tourism Authority, a function which he held until 1972. Between 1967 and 1972 he was concurrently Minister of Tourism and Antiquities. From 1967 to 1979 he was also a lecturer at the Faculty of Economics and Commerce of the University of Jordan. In 1980 he became special envoy of the United Nations agency World Tourism Organization. In the same year he was posted to the United Nations Office at Geneva, where he became the Jordanian Permanent Representative and served on the United Nations Commission on Human Rights. In 1985 he ended his work for those agencies and moved on to the International Labour Organization where he became Assistant Director General for activities in the Arab region until 1990.

He married his wife in 1959 and had three children with her. He died on 6 August 2014.
