= Sherif El-Khashab =

Egyptian football manager

Sherif El-Khashab (Arabic: شريف الخشاب, French: Chérif El-Khachab; born September 25, 1961) is an Egyptian football manager, He is a served as a head coach of Chad national football team from 2009 to 2011.
