= Hamada Barakat =

Moroccan footballer

Personal information
- Full name: Mohamed Hamada Barakate
- Date of birth: 22 February 1988 (age 38)
- Place of birth: Casablanca, Morocco
- Height: 1.84 m (6 ft 0 in)
- Position: Defender

Team information
- Current team: Kazma
- Number: 6

Youth career
- 2000–2007: Wydad Casablanca

Senior career*
Years	Team	Apps	(Gls)
2007–2011	Wydad Casablanca		
2007–2008	→ MC Oujda (loan)		
2011–2012	Hassania Agadir		
2012–20xx	Kazma	19	(0)

International career^{‡}
2006	Morocco U18		
- * Club domestic league appearances and goals ‡ National team caps and goals as of 23 December 2010 (UTC)

Mohamed Hamada Barakate (born 22 February 1988 in Casablanca) is a Moroccan footballer who plays as a defender for the Kuwaiti Premier League side Kazma.

== Biography ==
He Joined Wydad Casablanca at age 11 years old, and won the Junior Championship. He joined the under 18 national team for Morocco in 2006, and two years later he started his first professional match.

== Honours ==
Wydad Casablanca

- Botola: 2010
