= Oman Super Cup =

- Founded: 1999; 27 years ago
- Country: Oman
- Confederation: AFC
- Number of clubs: 2
- Current champions: Al-Shabab (1st title)
- Most championships: Al-Oruba (4 titles)
- Broadcaster: Oman Sports TV
- Current: 2025 Oman Super Cup

The Oman Super Cup (Arabic: كأس السوبر العماني) is an Omani football competition. It has been played on and off since the first edition was held in 1999. It is the curtain raiser to the Omani football season. It pairs the previous season's Sultan Qaboos Cup and the Oman Professional League champions.

== Championship history ==
As of 7 December 2023

=== Year by year ===
Season	Champion	Runner-up	Score
1999	Dhofar	Al-Seeb	2–1
2000	Al-Oruba	Dhofar	1–1 (a.e.t.) (10–9 pen.)
2001	Al-Seeb	Al-Nasr	3–1
2002	Al-Oruba	Al-Nasr	2–1
2004	Muscat	Al-Seeb	3–2
2005	Muscat	Dhofar	2–1
2008	Al-Oruba	Sur	2–0
2009	Al-Nahda	Al-Suwaiq	1–0
2010	Saham	Al-Suwaiq	1–0
2011	Al-Oruba	Al-Suwaiq	3–0
2012	Fanja	Dhofar	1–0
2013	Al-Suwaiq	Fanja	2–1
2014	Al-Nahda	Fanja	0–0 (6–5 pen.)
2015	Fanja	Al-Oruba	3–0 (Walkover)
2016	Saham	Fanja	1–0
2017	Dhofar	Al-Suwaiq	2–1
2018	Al-Nasr	Al-Suwaiq	0–0 (4–2 pen.)
2019	Dhofar	Sur	4–0
2020	Not played due to COVID-19 pandemic		
2022	Al-Seeb	Al-Nahda	2–0
2023	Al-Seeb	Al-Nahda	3–1
2024	Dhofar	Al-Seeb	3–2
2025	Al-Shabab	Al-Seeb	0–0 (5–4 pen.)

=== Performance by club ===
Club	Winners	Runners-up	Winning years
Dhofar	4	3	1999, 2017, 2019, 2024
Al-Oruba	4	1	2000, 2002, 2008, 2011
Al-Seeb	3	2	2001, 2022, 2023
Fanja SC	2	3	2012, 2015
Al-Nahda	2	2	2009, 2014
Muscat	2	—N/a	2004, 2005
Saham SC	2	—N/a	2010, 2016
Al-Suwaiq	1	5	2013
Al-Nasr	1	1	2018
Al-Shabab	1	—N/a	2025
Sur	—N/a	2	—N/a

=== Cities ===
The following table lists the Oman Super Cup champions by cities.

City	Titles	Winning clubs
Sur	4	Al-Oruba (4)
Salalah	4	Dhofar (3), Al Nasr (1)
Seeb	3	Al-Seeb (3)
Al Buraimi	2	Al-Nahda (2)
Muscat	2	Muscat (2)
Fanja	2	Fanja (2)
Saham	2	Saham (2)
Al-Suwaiq	1	Al-Suwaiq (1)

== Controversies ==
The 2015 Oman Super Cup was a subject of controversy as on 19 August 2015, the defending Oman Professional League and Sultan Qaboos Cup champions, Al-Oruba SC announced pulling out of the 2015 Oman Super Cup, citing non-payment of dues by the Oman Football Association and a late release of its players from national and army team camps as the main reasons. On 21 August 2015, Fanja was declared the winner of the Super Cup after its opponent, Al-Oruba, did not show up for the match in accordance with their August 19 announcement.

== See also ==
- Oman Professional League
- Sultan Qaboos Cup
- Oman Professional League Cup
