= 2015–16 Sultan Qaboos Cup =

Tournament details
- Country: Oman
- Teams: 38

Final positions
- Champions: Saham
- Runners-up: Al-Khaboura

Tournament statistics
- Matches played: 40
- Goals scored: 104 (2.6 per match)

The 2015–16 Sultan Qaboos Cup is the 43rd edition of the Sultan Qaboos Cup (Arabic: كأس السلطان قابوس), the premier knockout tournament for football teams in Oman.

The competition began on 23 October 2015 with the Qualification round. Al-Oruba SC were the defending champions, having won their fourth title in 2015. On Saturday 30 April 2016, Saham Club overcame Al-Khaboura SC with a solitary goal victory and to lay their hands on the prestigious Sultan Qaboos Cup trophy only for the second time in the club's history.

== Teams ==
The 2015–16 edition of the tournament had 38 teams.

- Ahli Sidab Club (Sidab)
- Al-Bashaer Club
- Al-Hamra SC (Al-Hamra)
- Al-Ittifaq Club
- Al-Ittihad Club (Salalah)
- Al-Kamel Wa Al-Wafi SC
- Al-Khabourah SC (Al-Khabourah)
- Al-Mudhaibi Club (Mudhaibi)
- Al-Musannah SC (Al-Musannah)
- Al-Nahda Club (Al-Buraimi)
- Al-Nasr S.C.S.C. (Salalah)
- Al-Oruba SC (Sur)
- Al-Rustaq SC (Rustaq)
- Al-Salam SC (Sohar)
- Al-Seeb Club (Al-Seeb)
- Al-Shabab Club (Seeb)
- Al-Suwaiq Club (Suwaiq
- Al-Tali'aa SC (Sur)
- Al-Wahda SC (Sur)
- Bahla Club (Bahla)
- Bidia SC (Bidiya)
- Bowsher Club (Bowsher)
- Dhofar S.C.S.C. (Salalah)
- Dibba Club (Dibba Al-Baya)
- Fanja SC (Fanja)
- Ibri Club (Ibri)
- Ja'lan SC (Jalan Bani Bu Ali)
- Khasab SC (Khasab)
- Madha SC (Madha)
- Masirah SC (Majees)
- Majees SC (Majees)
- Mirbat SC (Mirbat)
- Muscat Club (Muscat)
- Nizwa Club (Nizwa)
- Oman Club (Muscat)
- Quriyat Club (Quriyat)
- Saham SC (Saham)
- Salalah SC (Salalah)
- Samail SC (Samail)
- Sohar SC (Sohar)
- Sur SC (Sur)
- Yanqul SC (Yanqul)

== Qualification round ==
3 teams played a knockout tie. 3 ties were played over one leg. The first match was played between Al-Wusta Club and Dibba Club on 23 October 2015. Dibba Club, Al-Salam SC and Bidia SC advanced to the Round of 32 after winning their respective ties.

23 October 2015	Al-Wusta	0 – 1	Dibba
15:00 UTC+4		Report 1

23 October 2015	Al-Salam	4 – 0	Khasab
18:30 UTC+4		Report 1

23 October 2015	Bidia	0 – 0 (5 – 4 p)	Al-Ittifaq
18:30 UTC+4		Report 1

== Round of 32 ==
The draw for the round of 32 was held on 9 December 2015. 32 teams played a knockout tie. 16 ties were played over one leg. 16 teams advanced to the Round of 16. The first match was played between Ahli Sidab Club and Al-Shabab Club on 29 December 2015 at the Al-Seeb Stadium, Al-Seeb.

29 December 2015	Al-Shabab	2 - 1	Ahli Sidab	Al-Seeb Stadium, Al-Seeb, Oman
16:45 UTC+4	Al-Mushaifri 28', 89'	Report	Khalid Al-Batashi 23'	Referee: Khalid Al-Rushaidi (Oman)

29 December 2015	Saham	9 - 0	Bidia	Sohar Regional Sports Complex, Sohar, Oman
18:45 UTC+4	Alexandre Matão 21', 46'; Abdul Muain Al-Marzouqi 25', 83'; Al-Khaldi 28', 51'; Mosab Al-Sharqi 34'; Faisal Al-Buraiki 80'; Yousuf Al-Farsi 91'	Report		Referee: Ayub Al-Abri (Oman)

29 December 2015	Nizwa	1 - 0	Al-Bashaer	Nizwa Sports Complex, Nizwa, Oman
18:45 UTC+4	Mohammed El-Shazly	Report 1 Report 2		Referee: Al-Muatassim Al-Yaqoobi (Oman)

29 December 2015	Al-Musannah	1 - 1 (0 – 3 p)	Mirbat	Al-Seeb Stadium, Al-Seeb, Oman
20:00 UTC+4	da Silva 87' (pen.)	Report	Bassamagne 37'
	Penalties
	da Silva (penalty missed); Khalid Al-Yahyai (penalty missed); Al-Saadi (penalty missed)

30 December 2015	Ja'lan	0 - 1	Al-Khabourah	Sur Sports Complex, Sur, Oman
16:45 UTC+4		Report	Al-Ajmi 5'	Referee: Yaqoob Abdul Baki (Oman)

30 December 2015	Muscat	2 - 0	Al-Tali'aa	Al-Seeb Stadium, Al-Seeb, Oman
16:45 UTC+4	Calamari; Hamad Al-Habsi	Report		Referee: Jamal Al-Obaidani (Oman)

30 December 2015	Salalah	7 - 2	Al-Salam	Salalah Sports Complex, Salalah, Oman
17:15 UTC+4	Mohammed Ali Zabnoot 1'; Aremu Philip 6', 23'; Ernest Paa Ohene 52'; Ghanim Bait Said 56'; Bukhait Salim Fadhil 71'; Saleh 73'	Report	Mohammed Sulaiman Al-Balushi 18', 20'	Referee: Falah Al-Balushi (Oman)

30 December 2015	Al-Oruba	2 - 1	Sur	Sur Sports Complex, Sur, Oman
20:00 UTC+4	Peters 18'; Al-Lawati 64'	Report	Cédric Tchoumbé 78'	Referee: Abdullah Al Hilali (Oman)

30 December 2015	Bowsher	0 - 2	Al-Rustaq	Al-Seeb Stadium, Al-Seeb, Oman
20:00 UTC+4		Report	Kone Brice 1'; Saif Al-Hinai 48'	Referee: Ahmed Al-Kaf (Oman)

30 December 2015	Dhofar	3 - 1	Al-Kamel Wa Al-Wafi	Salalah Sports Complex, Salalah, Oman
20:30 UTC+4	Al-Dhabit 61', 74'; Al-Nahar 73'	Report	Jean Emy 22'	Referee: Badar Al-Shair (Oman)

31 December 2015	Dibba	0 - 2	Al-Suwaiq	Sohar Regional Sports Complex, Sohar, Oman
16:45 UTC+4		Report	Zaki Al-Saadi 48', 82'	Referee: Yahya Al-Balushi (Oman)

31 December 2015	Al-Mudhaibi	0 - 2	Oman	Nizwa Sports Complex, Nizwa, Oman
16:45 UTC+4		Report	Gustavo Correia 8'; Jaifar Yaqoob Al-Balushi 68'	Referee: Abdullah Al-Jardani (Oman)

31 December 2015	Al-Wahda	2 - 2 (4 – 3 p)	Al-Seeb	Sur Sports Complex, Sur, Oman
18:45 UTC+4	Jamal Toufiq 20'; Mohammed Al-Ibrahim 86'	Report	Omar Al-Malki 78'; Chulapa 68'	Referee: Khalid Al-Rushaidi (Oman)

31 December 2015	Al-Ittihad	0 -2	Al-Nasr	Salalah Sports Complex, Salalah, Oman
19:15 UTC+4		Report	Al-Siyabi 35'; Gwi-hyeon 56'	Referee: Majid Al-Hatmi (Oman)

31 December 2015	Bahla	2 - 3	Fanja	Nizwa Sports Complex, Nizwa, Oman
20:00 UTC+4	Jean Francis 35', 89'	Report	Al-Muqbali 15'; Al-Hosni 20', 33'	Referee: Turki Al-Salhi (Oman)

1 January 2016	Sohar	2 - 2 (5 – 4 p)	Al-Nahda	Sohar Regional Sports Complex, Sohar, Oman
20:00 UTC+4	Badar Al-Jabri 7'; Hatem Al-Rushdi 85'	Report 1 Report 2	Mohammed Al-Shamsi 19'; Al-Ruzaiqi 46'	Referee: Yaqoob Abdul Baki (Oman)
	Penalties
	Hatem Al-Rushdi (penalty scored); Ahmed Al-Khamisi (penalty scored); Salim Al-Muqbali (penalty scored); Ahmed Al-Kahali (penalty missed); Abdul Aziz Al-Hosni (penalty scored); Matar Al-Washahi (penalty scored)		Diane (penalty scored); Salem Al-Shamsi (penalty scored); Mohammed Al-Shamsi (penalty missed); Demba (penalty scored); Al-Ruzaiqi (penalty scored); Al-Busaidi (penalty missed)

== Round of 16 ==
The draw for the round of 16 was held on 4 January 2016. 16 teams played a knockout tie. 8 ties were played over one leg. 8 teams advanced to the Quarter-finals. The first match was played between Oman Club and Fanja SC on 13 January 2016 at the Al-Seeb Stadium, Al-Seeb.

13 January 2016	Oman	0 - 2	Fanja	Al-Seeb Stadium, Al-Seeb, Oman
17:00 UTC+4		Report	Al-Muqbali 47', 85'	Referee: Badar Al-Shaer (Oman)

13 January 2016	Al-Khaboura	3 - 2	Nizwa	Sohar Regional Sports Complex, Sohar, Oman
17:00 UTC+4	Said Obaid Al-Abdul Salam 30'; Nabeeh Al-Rushaidi 61'; Al-Ajmi 63'	Report	Salem 34' (pen.); Humaid Al-Hinai 80'	Referee: Khalid Al-Rushaidi (Oman)

13 January 2016	Al-Rustaq	2 - 1	Mirbat	Al-Seeb Stadium, Al-Seeb, Oman
20:00 UTC+4	Mathieu Vangah 13', 29'	Report	Bassamagne 39' (pen.)	Referee: Jamal Al-Eidani (Oman)

13 January 2016	Al-Suwaiq	1 - 0	Al-Oruba	Sohar Regional Sports Complex, Sohar, Oman
20:00 UTC+4	Zaki Al-Saadi 37'	Report		Referee: Naif Al-Balushi (Oman)

14 January 2016	Muscat	1 - 0	Sohar	Al-Seeb Stadium, Al-Seeb, Oman
17:00 UTC+4	Abdou Kader Fall 46'	Report		Referee: Haitham Al-Amri (Oman)

14 January 2016	Salalah	2 - 1	Al-Wahda	Salalah Sports Complex, Salalah, Oman
17:30 UTC+4	Ernest Paa Ohene 67'; Ghanim Bait Said 83'	Report	Al-Mundhar Al-Alawi 44'	Referee: Zakri Al-Hinai (Oman)

14 January 2016	Al-Shabab	2 - 2 (3 – 5 p)	Saham	Al-Seeb Stadium, Al-Seeb, Oman
20:00 UTC+4	Al-Mushaifri 1', 8'	Report	Alexandre Matão 49'; Koulibaly 90'	Referee: Mahmood Al-Jarfi (Oman)
	Penalties
	Ely Cisse (penalty scored); Al-Harith Al-Balushi (penalty scored); Abudllah Al-Habshi (penalty missed); Muath Al-Khaldi (penalty scored); Shawqi Al-Saadi (penalty scored)		Al-Khaldi (penalty scored); Koulibaly (penalty scored); Abudlaziz Al-Shamoosi (penalty scored); Muath Al-Khaldi (penalty scored); Mosab Al-Sharqi (penalty scored)

14 January 2016	Dhofar	1 - 2	Al-Nasr	Salalah Sports Complex, Salalah, Oman
20:30 UTC+4	Al-Hadhri 40'	Report	Mazin Al-Saadi 63'; Soro Nanga 91'	Referee: Yaqoob Abdul Baki (Oman)

== Quarter-finals ==
The draw for the Quarter-finals was held on 25 January 2016. 8 teams played knockout ties. 4 ties were played over two legs. The first match was played between Al-Nasr S.C.S.C. and Fanja SC on 15 February 2016 at the Salalah Sports Complex, Salalah. Al-Nasr S.C.S.C., Al-Khabourah SC, Salalah SC and Saham Club advanced to the Semi-finals.

=== First leg ===
15 February 2016	Al-Nasr	0 - 1	Fanja	Salalah Sports Complex, Salalah, Oman
17:45 UTC+4		Report 1 Report 2	Al-Musalami 80'	Referee: Omar Al-Yaqoobi (Oman)

15 February 2016	Al-Suwaiq	0 - 0	Al-Khabourah	Sohar Regional Sports Complex, Sohar, Oman
20:00 UTC+4		Report

16 February 2016	Al-Rustaq	0 - 1	Salalah	Al-Seeb Stadium, Al-Seeb, Oman
17:15 UTC+4		Report 1 Report 2	Abdul Al-Shamas 18'	Referee: Yaqoob Abdul Baki (Oman)

16 February 2016	Muscat	2 - 1	Saham	Al-Seeb Stadium, Al-Seeb, Oman
20:15 UTC+4	Abdou Kader Fall 23'; Diouf 87'	Report	Al-Khaldi 57'	Referee: Ahmed Al-Kaf (Oman)

=== Second leg ===
27 February 2016	Saham	3 - 0	Muscat	Sohar Regional Sports Complex, Sohar, Oman
17:30 UTC+4	Dieng 38'; Mosab Al-Sharqi 50'; Al-Khaldi 63'	Report		Referee: Yaqoob Abdul Baki (Oman)

27 February 2016	Salalah	2 - 3 (a.e.t.) (5 – 4 p)	Al-Rustaq	Salalah Sports Complex, Salalah, Oman
20:30 UTC+4	Abdul Al-Shamas 101', 112'	Report	Aremu Philip 29' (pen.); Taisir Al-Hilali 95'; Essam Al-Barahi 108'	Referee: Jamal Al-Obaidani (Oman)
	Penalties
	Saleh (penalty scored); Bukhait Fadhil (penalty scored); El-Belqasy (penalty scored); Ghanim Bait Said (penalty scored); Ernest Paa Ohene (penalty scored)		Mohammed Humaid Al-Hinai (penalty scored); Sami Al-Ajmi (penalty missed); Ayangma Cedric (penalty scored); Essam Al-Barahi (penalty scored); Kone Brice (penalty scored)

28 February 2016	Al-Khabourah	2 - 1	Al-Suwaiq	Sohar Regional Sports Complex, Sohar, Oman
17:30 UTC+4	Al-Ajmi 40' (pen.); Mohammed Al-Matroshi 88'	Report	Mamadou Diagne 48'	Referee: Omar Al-Yaqoobi (Oman)

28 February 2016	Fanja	1 - 2	Al-Nasr	Sultan Qaboos Sports Complex, Bowsher, Muscat, Oman
20:30 UTC+4	Al-Ghassani 72'	Report	Koffi 37', 50'	Referee: Haitham Al-Amri (Oman)

== Semi-finals ==
The draw for the Semi-finals was held on 2 March 2016. 4 teams played knockout ties. 2 ties were played over two legs. Saham Club and Al-Khaboura SC advanced to the Finals, with the latter making its first ever Sultan Qaboos Cup finals in the history of the club.

=== First leg ===
6 April 2016	Saham	0 - 0	Al-Nasr	Sohar Regional Sports Complex, Sohar, Oman
17:45 UTC+4		Report		Referee: Zakri Al-Hinai (Oman)

6 April 2016	Salalah	0 - 0	Al-Khabourah	Salalah Sports Complex, Salalah, Oman
20:00 UTC+4		Report		Referee: Haitham Al-Amri (Oman)

=== Second leg ===
17 April 2016	Al-Khabourah	1 - 0	Salalah	Sohar Regional Sports Complex, Sohar, Oman
18:00 UTC+4	Thani Al-Rushaidi 64'	Report		Referee: Mahmood Al-Majrafi (Oman)

17 April 2016	Al-Nasr	0 - 1	Saham	Salalah Sports Complex, Salalah, Oman
20:45 UTC+4		Report	Al-Khaldi 87'	Referee: Yaqoob Abdul Baki (Oman)

== Finals ==
The Finals of the 2015–16 Sultan Qaboos Cup was played between Al-Khabourah SC and Saham Club, both from the Al-Batinah on 30 April 2016 at the Sohar Regional Sports Complex, Sohar under the auspices of His Excellency Hassan Al-Shuraiqi, Inspector General of Police and Customs.

30 April 2016	Al-Khabourah	0 - 1	Saham	Sohar Regional Sports Complex, Sohar, Oman
19:15 UTC+4		[soccerway.com/matches/2016/04/30/oman/sultan-cup/al-khaboora/saham/2231161/ Report]	Mohammed Matr Al-Marzouqi 92'	Referee: Ahmed Al-Kaf (Oman)

== See also ==
- 2015–16 Oman Professional League
- 2015–16 Oman Professional League Cup
- 2015–16 Oman First Division League
