= 2015–16 Oman Professional League Cup =

Tournament details
- Country: Oman
- Teams: 14

Final positions
- Champions: Al-Nasr
- Runners-up: Sohar

Tournament statistics
- Matches played: 49
- Goals scored: 118 (2.41 per match)
- Top goal scorer(s): (Oman) Abdul Rahman Al-Ghassani (6 goals)

The 2015–16 Oman Professional League Cup (known as the Mazda Professional Cup for sponsorship reasons) was the fifth edition of a domestic football competition held in Oman.

The competition features four groups of 3-4 teams (Group A and B featured 4 teams and Group C and D featured 3 teams), with the group stage winners entering the semi-finals stage. Groups featuring three sides played each other thrice so that each team could play 6 matches in the group phase.

The competition featured all the clubs playing in the top flight in the 2015–16 season.

The competition began on 5 September 2015, and concluded on 27 March 2016. On Sunday 27 March 2016, Al-Nasr S.C.S.C. were crowned the champions defeating Sohar SC 2–0 in the finals and hence winning the title for the first time.

== Group stage ==
=== Group A ===
Team	Pld	W	D	L	GF	GA	GD	Pts
(Oman) Al-Nahda	6	4	1	1	11	8	+3	13
(Oman) Sohar	6	3	1	2	10	7	+3	10
(Oman) Saham	6	1	3	2	6	5	+1	6
(Oman) Al-Khabourah	6	1	1	4	1	8	−7	−2 (Note: Al-Khaboura was docked 6 points for failing to show for the match on 8 September 2015 against Sohar at the Sohar Regional Sports Complex)

Notes:
8 September 2015
19:30 UTC+4

Al-Nahda	1 - 1	Saham
Asaad Al-Marzouqi		Muath Al-Khaldi

Al-Buraimi Sports Complex, Al-Buraimi, Oman
8 September 2015
19:30 UTC+4

Al-Khabourah	0 - 3	Sohar

Sohar Regional Sports Complex, Sohar, Oman
1 October 2015
19:15 UTC+4

Sohar	0 - 0	Saham

Sohar Regional Sports Complex, Sohar, Oman
1 October 2015
19:15 UTC+4

Al-Nahda	2 - 0	Al-Khabourah
Asaad Al-Marzouqi; Anwar Al-Hinai

Al-Buraimi Sports Complex, Al-Buraimi, Oman
5 October 2015
19:15 UTC+4

Al-Nahda	0 - 2	Sohar
		Admir Malkic; Khalifa Al-Jahoori 53'

Al-Buraimi Sports Complex, Al-Buraimi, Oman
5 October 2015
19:15 UTC+4

Al-Khabourah	0 - 0	Saham

Sohar Regional Sports Complex, Sohar, Oman
11 October 2015
17:15 UTC+4

Sohar	3 - 4	Al-Nahda
Admir Malkic; Gerc; Khalid Al-Muqbali		Al-Nuaimi; Demba; Mbang Ondo pen.' Mbang Ondo

Sohar Regional Sports Complex, Sohar, Oman
11 October 2015
20:30 UTC+4

Saham	0 - 1	Al-Khabourah
		Badar Al-Quraini

Sohar Regional Sports Complex, Sohar, Oman
3 November 2015
18:45 UTC+4

Saham	2 - 3	Al-Nahda
Yousuf Al-Farsi; Alexandre Matão pen.'		Mohammed Al-Marzouqi o.g.' Demba; Al-Nuaimi

Saham, Oman
3 November 2015
18:45 UTC+4

Sohar	2 - 0	Al-Khabourah
Hatem Al-Rushdi; Ahmed Al-Mamari

Sohar, Oman
8 November 2015
18:45 UTC+4

Saham	3 - 0	Sohar
Yousuf Al-Farsi 50'; Faisal Al-Buraiki 70'; Yousuf Al-Farsi 85'

Saham, Oman
8 November 2015
18:45 UTC+4

Al-Khabourah	0 - 1	Al-Nahda
		Bamasila

Al-Khabourah, Al Batinah Region, Oman

=== Group B ===
Team	Pld	W	D	L	GF	GA	GD	Pts
(Oman) Al-Musannah	6	3	1	2	10	5	+5	10
(Oman) Fanja	6	3	1	2	10	6	+4	10
(Oman) Al-Suwaiq	6	2	1	3	8	13	−5	7
(Oman) Al-Shabab	6	1	3	2	3	7	−4	6

5 September 2015
17:45 UTC+4

Fanja	1 - 0	Al-Musannah
Samir Al-Tobi

Nizwa Sports Complex, Nizwa, Oman
5 September 2015
20:30 UTC+4

Al-Suwaiq	3 - 1	Al-Shabab
Koffi; Mosab Al-Saadi; Koffi		Douglas Silveira

Al-Seeb Stadium, Al-Seeb, Oman
8 September 2015
19:30 UTC+4

Al-Musannah	3 - 1	Al-Suwaiq
Al-Ghassani; Al-Ghassani da Silva		Yousuf Al-Saadi

Al-Rustaq, Oman
8 September 2015
20:30 UTC+4

Al-Shabab	0 - 0	Fanja

Nizwa Sports Complex, Nizwa, Oman
1 October 2015
17:15 UTC+4

Fanja	1 - 2	Al-Suwaiq
Samir Al-Tobi 82'		Koffi 68'; Ablaye Gaye 92' (pen.)

Al-Seeb Stadium, Al-Seeb, Oman
1 October 2015
20:00 UTC+4

Al-Musannah	0 - 0	Al-Shabab

Al-Seeb Stadium, Al-Seeb, Oman
3 November 2015
16:45 UTC+4

Al-Suwaiq	0 - 4	Al-Musannah
		Al-Saadi; Abdul Majeed Al-Sooli; Khaleel Al-Qutaiti; Mubarak Al-Balushi

Al-Rustaq, Oman
4 November 2015
18:45 UTC+4

Fanja	3 - 0	Al-Shabab
Jarlisson Pereira 52' (pen.); Al-Ghassani 68'; Al-Ghassani 68'

Muscat, Oman
9 November 2015
16:45 UTC+4

Al-Shabab	1 - 0	Al-Musannah
Tariq Al-Thehli

Al-Rustaq, Oman
10 November 2015
16:45 UTC+4

Al-Suwaiq	1 - 3	Fanja
Al-Saadi		Al-Ghassani; Omar Al-Hasani; Al-Ghassani

Al-Rustaq, Oman
14 November 2015
16:45 UTC+4

Al-Musannah	3 - 2	Fanja
Khaleel Al-Qutaiti 10'; Al-Saadi 39', 76'		Mubarak Al-Muqbali 1'; Al-Ghassani 25'

Al-Seeb Stadium, Al-Seeb, Oman
14 November 2015
19:30 UTC+4

Al-Shabab	1 - 1	Al-Suwaiq
Tariq Al-Thehli		Al-Abd Al-Noufali

Al-Seeb Stadium, Al-Seeb, Oman

=== Group C ===
Team	Pld	W	D	L	GF	GA	GD	Pts
(Oman) Muscat	6	2	3	1	8	6	+2	9
(Oman) Sur	6	1	4	1	3	3	0	7
(Oman) Al-Oruba	6	1	3	2	4	6	−2	6

5 September 2015
19:30 UTC+4

Sur	0 - 1	Muscat
		Vinícius

Sur Sports Complex, Sur, Oman
8 September 2015
19:15 UTC+4

Al-Oruba	1 - 1	Muscat
Al-Lawati		Al-Habsi

Sur Sports Complex, Sur, Oman
1 October 2015
20:00 UTC+4

Al-Oruba	0 - 1	Sur
		Khalid Al-Alawi pen.'

Sultan Qaboos Sports Complex, Muscat, Oman
5 October 2015
19:15 UTC+4

Muscat	1 - 1	Sur
Vinícius 33'		Khalid Al-Alawi pen.'

Muscat, Oman
4 November 2015
18:45 UTC+4

Muscat	3 - 1	Al-Oruba
Zongo; Zongo; Hamad Al-Habsi		Al-Matari

Muscat, Oman
8 November 2015
18:45 UTC+4

Sur	0 - 0	Al-Oruba

Sur Sports Complex, Sur, Oman
14 November 2015
18:30 UTC+4

Sur	1 - 1	Muscat
Al-Mukhaini 56'		Vinícius 80'

Muscat, Oman
14 December 2015
18:45 UTC+4

Al-Oruba	2 - 1	Muscat
Yousuf Al-Mukhaini; Peters

Quriyat, Oman
22 December 2015
18:45 UTC+4

Al-Oruba	0 - 0	Sur

Jalan Bani Bu Ali, Oman

=== Group D ===
Team	Pld	W	D	L	GF	GA	GD	Pts
(Oman) Dhofar	6	2	3	1	7	7	0	9
(Oman) Al-Nasr	6	2	1	3	6	5	+1	7
(Oman) Salalah	6	1	4	1	6	7	−1	7

5 September 2015
19:45 UTC+4

Al-Nasr	2 - 1	Salalah
Mohammed; Marwan Abdul Rajab Dorbeen

Al-Saada Stadium, Salalah, Oman
8 September 2015
19:30 UTC+4

Salalah	1 - 1	Dhofar
Aremu Philip		Malcuit

Al-Saada Stadium, Salalah, Oman
1 October 2015
19:15 UTC+4

Dhofar	2 - 0	Al-Nasr
Al-Hadhri 44'; Al-Hadhri 63'

Al-Saada Stadium, Salalah, Oman
5 October 2015
19:15 UTC+4

Salalah	0 - 0	Al-Nasr

Al-Saada Stadium, Salalah, Oman
8 November 2015
19:15 UTC+4

Al-Nasr	0 - 1	Dhofar
		Nabil

Salalah Sports Complex, Salalah, Oman
11 November 2015
17:00 UTC+4

Dhofar	0 - 0	Salalah

Salalah Sports Complex, Salalah, Oman
14 November 2015
19:15 UTC+4

Al-Nasr	1 - 2	Salalah
Jamal		Saleh; Aremu Philip

Salalah Sports Complex, Salalah, Oman
18 November 2015
19:15 UTC+4

Salalah	3 - 3	Dhofar
Saleh 21', 43'; Mubarak 77'		Khaled Gharsallaoui 16', 25'; Malcuit 75'

Salalah Sports Complex, Salalah, Oman
14 December 2015
19:15 UTC+4

Dhofar	0 - 3	Al-Nasr
		Diawara; Ali Al-Shehri; Soro Nanga

Salalah Sports Complex, Salalah, Oman

== Quarter-finals ==
21 December 2015
16:45 UTC+4

Al-Musannah	2 - 1	Sur
Al-Ghassani 34'; Al-Saadi 42'		Saleh Al-Araimi 68'

Muscat, Oman
Referee: Zakria Al-Hinai (Oman)
21 December 2015
18:45 UTC+4

Al-Nahda	1 - 2	Al-Nasr
Al-Ruzaiqi 7'		Soro Nanga 45'; Diawara 90'

Al-Buraimi, Oman
Referee: Naif Al-Balushi (Oman)
22 December 2015
17:15 UTC+4

Dhofar	1 - 4	Sohar
Malcuit		Ahmed Malallah; Khalifa Al-Jamhoori; Ahmed Al-Ajmi; Badar Al-Jabri

Salalah Sports Complex, Salalah, Oman
4 January 2015^{*}
16:30 UTC+4

Muscat	0 - 3	Fanja
		Jarlisson Perreira; Mukhlid Al-Raqadi; Khalid Al-Hamdani

Fanja, Oman
Referee: Zakri Al-Hinai (Oman)

^{*}The 2015 Oman Professional League Cup Quarter-final between Muscat Club and Fanja SC scheduled to be played on 22 December 2015 was called off and postponed to 4 January 2015 due to late arrival of ambulance on the match day

== Semi-finals ==
20 March 2016
17:00 UTC+4

Al-Nasr	3 - 1	Al-Musannah
Koffi 29'; Al-Hamar 33'; Mazin Al-Saadi 65'		Fahad Nasib Bamasila 8' (o.g.)

Salalah Sports Complex, Salalah, Oman
Referee: Jamal Al-Obaidani (Oman)
20 March 2016
19:30 UTC+4

Sohar	4 - 1	Fanja
Gerc 16' (pen.); Gerc 42' (pen.); Gerc 69' (pen.); Mahmood Ayad 34' (o.g.)		Al-Ghassani 90'

Sohar Regional Sports Complex, Sohar, Oman
Referee: Majid Al-Hatmi (Oman)

== Finals ==
27 March 2016
19:30 UTC+4

Al-Nasr	2 - 0	Sohar
Mazin Al-Saadi 34'; Jamal 65'

Sultan Qaboos Sports Complex, Bowsher, Muscat, Oman
Referee: Zakri Al-Hinai (Oman)

== Statistics ==
As of 27 March 2016

=== Top scorers ===
Rank	Scorer	Club	Goals
1	(Oman) Abdul Rahman Al-Ghassani	Fanja	6
2	(Oman) Waleed Al-Saadi	Al-Musannah	4
3	(Ivory Coast) Abdoulaye Koffi	Al-Suwaiq	3
3	(Oman) Hashim Saleh	Salalah	3
3	(Oman) Jamal Mohammed	Al-Nasr	3
3	(Oman) Mohammed Al-Ghassani	Al-Musannah	3
3	(France) Samir Malcuit	Dhofar	3
3	(Croatia) Vedran Gerc	Sohar	3
3	(Brazil) Vinícius Calamari	Muscat	3
3	(Oman) Yousuf Al-Farsi	Saham	3

=== Top Omani Scorers ===
Rank	Scorer	Club	Goals
1	(Oman) Abdul Rahman Al-Ghassani	Fanja	6
2	(Oman) Waleed Al-Saadi	Al-Musannah	4
2	(Oman) Hashim Saleh	Salalah	3
2	(Oman) Mohammed Al-Ghassani	Al-Musannah	3
2	(Oman) Yousuf Al-Farsi	Saham	3

== OFA Awards ==
Oman Football Association awarded the following awards for the 2015–16 Oman Professional League Cup season.

- Top Scorer: Abdul Rahman Al-Ghassani (Fanja)
- Fair Play Award: Al-Musannah SC

== See also ==
- 2015–16 Oman Professional League
- 2015–16 Sultan Qaboos Cup
