= 2009 Sultan Qaboos Cup =

Tournament details
- Country: Oman
- Teams: 32

Final positions
- Champions: Saham
- Runner-up: Dhofar

Tournament statistics
- Matches played: 37
- Goals scored: 101 (2.73 per match)
- Top goal scorer(s): (Cameroon) Bong Bertrand (Gabon) Etienne Bito'o (Oman) Badr Al-Maimani (5 goals)

The 2009 Sultan Qaboos Cup was the 37th edition of the Sultan Qaboos Cup (Arabic: كأس السلطان قابوس), the premier knockout tournament for football teams in Oman.

The competition began on 25 September 2009 with the Round of 32 and concluded on 7 December 2009. Al-Suwaiq Club were the defending champions, having won their first title in 2008. Saham SC were crowned the champions of the 2009 Sultan Qaboos Cup, winning the title for the first time. They defeated Dhofar S.C.S.C. 7–6 on penalties after the match had ended 2-2 after extra time.

== Teams ==
This year the tournament had 32 teams. The winners qualified for the 2010 AFC Cup.

- Ahli Sidab Club (Sidab)
- Al-Bashaer Club
- Al-Ittihad Club (Salalah)
- Al-Kamel Wa Al-Wafi SC
- Al-Khaboora SC (Al-Khaboora)
- Al-Musannah SC (Al-Musannah)
- Al-Mudhaibi SC (Mudhaibi)
- Al-Nahda Club (Al-Buraimi)
- Al-Nasr S.C.S.C. (Salalah)
- Al-Oruba SC (Sur)
- Al-Salam SC (Sohar)
- Al-Seeb Club (Seeb)
- Al-Shabab Club (Seeb)
- Al-Suwaiq Club (Suwaiq
- Al-Tali'aa SC (Sur)
- Al-Wahda SC (Sur)
- Bahla Club (Bahla)
- Bowsher Club (Bawshar)
- Dhofar S.C.S.C. (Salalah)
- Fanja SC (Fanja)
- Ibri Club (Ibri)
- Ja'lan SC (Jalan Bani Bu Ali)
- Majees SC (Majees)
- Mirbat SC (Mirbat)
- Muscat Club (Muscat)
- Nizwa Club (Nizwa)
- Oman Club (Muscat)
- Quriyat Club (Quriyat)
- Saham SC (Saham)
- Salalah SC (Salalah)
- Sohar SC (Sohar)
- Sur SC (Sur)

== Round of 32 ==
32 teams played a knockout tie. 16 ties were played over one leg. The first match played was between Dhofar S.C.S.C. and Sur SC on 25 September 2009. 16 teams advanced to the Round of 16.

25 September 2009	Dhofar	4 – 0	Sur	Al-Seeb Stadium, Al-Seeb, OmanSur Sports Complex, Sur, Oman
18:30 UTC+4	Bito'o 45' (pen.); Al-Hadhri 62'; Mohammed Taqi 65'; Ahmed Manaa 90+2' (pen.)

25 September 2009	Al-Oruba	2 – 0	Al-Musannah	Sultan Qaboos Sports Complex, Muscat, Oman
18:30 UTC+4

26 September 2009	Al-Nasr	2 – 1	Salalah	Salalah Sports Complex, Salalah, Oman
18:30 UTC+4

26 September 2009	Muscat	3 – 0	Ja’lan	Sur Sports Complex, Sur, Oman
18:30 UTC+4	Al-Maimani 27', 38', 74'

26 September 2009	Al-Shabab	1 – 2	Saham	Al-Seeb Stadium, Al-Seeb, Al-Batinah, Oman
18:30 UTC+4

26 September 2009	Al-Wahda	1 – 0	Majees
18:30 UTC+4	Al-Sunidi 11'

26 September 2009	Fanja	3 – 0	Nizwa	Nizwa Sports Complex, Nizwa, Oman
18:30 UTC+4	Al-Hidaibi 2'; Moiz Mohammed 61'; Mohammed Said 83'

26 September 2009	Al-Salam	6 – 0	Mirbat
18:30 UTC+4	Nasser Bilal 12', 59'; Badar Obaid 15'; Said Mubarak 44'; Ahmed Murad 47'; Khalifa Said 89'

26 September 2009	Quriyat	1 – 3	Al-Suwaiq
18:30 UTC+4	Khalifa 54'		Mohsin Saleh 17'; Abdullah Al-Shuain 64'; Al-Touqi 83'

27 September 2009	Oman	4 – 0	Bowsher	Sultan Qaboos Sports Complex, Muscat, Oman
18:30 UTC+4

27 September 2009	Al-Nahda	3 – 1	Al-Bashaer
18:30 UTC+4

27 September 2009	Al-Seeb	2 – 1	Al-Kamel wa Al-Wafi	Nizwa Sports Complex, Nizwa, Oman
18:30 UTC+4	Eduardo Lima 20'; Al-Qaidhi 51'		Salim Mubarak 81'

27 September 2009	Al-Khaboora	1 – 0	Al-Tali'aa	Al-Seeb Stadium, Al-Seeb, Oman
18:30 UTC+4	Khalifa Zaid 19'

27 September 2009	Ahli Sidab	3 – 1	Sohar
18:30 UTC+4	Ishaq 20'; Fabiano 23'; Al-Shaqsi 25'		Al-Balushi 30'

27 September 2009	Al-Ittihad	1 – 2	Bahla
18:30 UTC+4	Raid Said 90+1'		Al-Hinai 20'; Al-Alawi 90+20'

27 September 2009	Al-Mudhaibi	1 – 0	Ibri
18:30 UTC+4	Nasser Abdullah 14'

== Round of 16 ==
16 teams played a knockout tie. 8 ties were played over one leg. The first match was played between Al-Nasr S.C.S.C. and Muscat Club on 1 October 2009. 8 teams advanced to the Quarterfinals.

1 October 2009	Al-Nasr	0 – 1	Muscat	Nizwa Sports Complex, Nizwa, Oman
18:45 UTC+4			Al-Maimani 72'

1 October 2009	Al-Salam	0 – 1	Oman	Sultan Qaboos Sports Complex, Muscat, Oman
18:45 UTC+4			Frank pen.'

1 October 2009	Al-Suwaiq	3 – 0	Al-Wahda	Sultan Qaboos Sports Complex, Muscat, Oman
18:45 UTC+4	Leonardo; Emmanuel; Al-Gheilani

2 October 2009	Dhofar	1 – 0	Al-Nahda	Al-Seeb Stadium, Al-Seeb, Oman
17:10 UTC+4	Bito'o 17'

2 October 2009	Al-Mudhaibi	0 – 2	Saham	Sultan Qaboos Sports Complex, Muscat, Oman
17:10 UTC+4			Bong-Takwi; Al-Mazrouqi

2 October 2009	Al-Khaboora	1 – 2	Ahli Sidab	Al-Seeb Stadium, Al-Seeb, Oman
20:00 UTC+4	Ali Mubarak		Fabiano; Naif Obaid

2 October 2009	Al-Seeb	2 – 1	Fanja	Sultan Qaboos Sports Complex, Muscat, Oman
20:00 UTC+4	Eduardo Lima*2		Juma Khamis

3 October 2009	Al-Oruba	1 – 0	Bahla	Al-Seeb Stadium, Al-Seeb, Oman
18:45 UTC+4	Yaqoob Juma 85'

== Quarterfinals ==
8 teams played a knockout tie. 4 ties were played over two legs. The first match was played between Al-Oruba SC and Al-Suwaiq Club on 18 October 2009. Al-Suwaiq Club, Saham SC, Dhofar S.C.S.C. and Oman Club qualified for the Semifinals.

=== 1st Legs ===
18 October 2009	Al-Oruba	1 – 2	Al-Suwaiq	Sur Sports Complex, Sur, Oman
18:20 UTC+4	Khalfan 67'		Naif Obaid 60'; Al-Gheilani 75'

18 October 2009	Al-Seeb	0 – 3	Saham	Al-Seeb Stadium, Al-Seeb, Oman
20:30 UTC+4			Yaqoob 9', 37'; Bong-Takwi 90'

19 October 2009	Dhofar	2 – 1	Muscat	Salalah Sports Complex, Salalah, Oman
18:20 UTC+4	Bito'o 24'; Mohammed Taqi 75'		Al-Maimani 30'

19 October 2009	Oman	0 – 0	Ahli Sidab	Al-Seeb Stadium, Al-Seeb, Oman
20:30 UTC+4

=== 2nd Legs ===
29 October 2009	Muscat	0 – 1	Dhofar	Al-Seeb Stadium, Al-Seeb, Oman
18:30 UTC+4			Ahmed Manaa 57'

30 October 2009	Ahli Sidab	0 – 3	Oman	Sultan Qaboos Sports Complex, Muscat, Oman
18:30 UTC+4			Haitham Masoud; Mahmood Mansour*2

31 October 2009	Saham	2 – 2	Al-Seeb	Sohar Regional Sports Complex, Sohar, Oman
18:30 UTC+4	Abdullah Khamis 77'; Al-Mazrouqi 89'		Al-Noufali 66', 88'

1 November 2009	Al-Suwaiq	1 – 1	Al-Oruba	Sohar Regional Sports Complex, Sohar, Oman
18:30 UTC+4	Al-Gheilani		Saad Suhail

== Semifinals ==
4 teams played a knockout tie. 2 ties were played over two legs. The first match was played between Dhofar S.C.S.C. and Oman Club on 8 November 2009. Saham SC and Dhofar S.C.S.C. qualified for the Finals.

=== 1st Legs ===
8 November 2009	Dhofar	3 – 0	Oman	Al-Saada Stadium, Salalah, Oman
18:30 UTC+4	Bito'o 55', 64'; Hashim 71'

8 November 2009	Saham	1 – 2	Al-Suwaiq	Sohar Regional Sports Complex, Sohar, Oman
19:30 UTC+4	Bong-Takwi 19'		Moshin Saleh 49' (pen.); Hashim 75'

=== 2nd Legs ===
22 November 2009	Al-Suwaiq	1 – 3	Saham	Al-Seeb Stadium, Al-Seeb, Al-Batinah, Oman
18:30 UTC+4	Nabeel Abdullah 53'		Mohsin Johar 6', 45'; Yaqoob 82'

22 November 2009	Oman	3 – 1	Dhofar	Sultan Qaboos Sports Complex, Muscat, Oman
20:40 UTC+4	Al-Hadrami 23' (pen.), pen.' Omar Naji 68'		Al-Hadhri 60' (pen.)

== Finals ==
7 December 2009	Saham	2 – 2 (7 - 6 p)	Dhofar	Sultan Qaboos Sports Complex, Muscat, Oman
19:00 UTC+4	Bong-Takwi 6'; Mohsin Johar 90+23'		Al-Hadhri 81', 90+15'
	Penalties
	Mohsin Johar (penalty scored); Yaqoob (penalty scored); Bong-Takwi (penalty scored); Al-Mazrouqi (penalty scored); Ahmed Salim (penalty scored); Mohammed Saleh (penalty scored); Nasser Sulaiman (penalty scored)		Bito'o (penalty scored); Emana (penalty scored); Al-Hadhri (penalty scored); Shaaban (penalty scored); Hashim (penalty scored); Cédric (penalty scored); Suhail Ali (penalty missed)
