= 2015–16 Oman Second Division League =

Oman Second Division League
- Season: 2015–16
- Champions: Bidia
- Matches: 66
- Goals: 94 (1.42 per match)
- Biggest home win: Dibba 4-0 Khasab (13 November 2015)
- Biggest away win: Khasab 0-3 Dibba (29 January 2016); Dibba 0-3 Al-Wusta (26 February 2016)
- Highest scoring: Dibba 5-3 Al-Salam (15 January 2016)
- Longest winning run: Dibba (3 matches)
- Longest unbeaten run: Al-Wusta (5 matches)
- Longest losing run: Al-Bashaer; Khasab (3 matches)

The 2015–16 Oman Second Division League (known as the Omantel Second Division League for sponsorship reasons) is the 40th edition of the third-highest division overall football league in Oman. The season began on 16 October 2015. Bahla Club are the defending champions. Bidia SC were crowned the champions of the 2015–16 Oman Second Division League on 26 February 2016 after they secured a 2–1 win over Al-Salam SC at the Nizwa Sports Complex.

== Group A ==
As of 22 January 2016

Pos	Team	Pld	W	D	L	GF	GA	GD	Pts	Qualification
1	Al-Wusta	9	5	3	1	13	10	+3	18	Qualification to Semi-finals
2	Bidia	9	4	1	4	12	11	+1	13	Qualification to Semi-finals
3	Al-Ittifaq	9	3	3	3	13	12	+1	12	
4	Al-Bashaer	9	2	1	6	9	14	−5	7	

Rules for classification: 1) points; 2) goal difference; 3) number of goals scored.

=== Clubs season-progress ===
Win
Draw
Lose

Team ╲ Round	1	2	3	4	5	6	7	8	9
Al-Bashaer	W	L	L	W	L	D	L	L	L
Al-Ittifaq	D	L	W	L	L	D	W	W	D
Al-Wusta	D	W	W	L	W	D	W	W	D
Bidia	L	W	L	W	W	D	L	L	W

Updated to match(es) played on 22 January 2016. Source: Clubs Season-Progress

== Group B ==
As of 29 January 2016

Pos	Team	Pld	W	D	L	GF	GA	GD	Pts	Qualification
1	Dibba	8	6	1	1	19	7	+12	19	Qualification to Semi-finals
2	Al-Salam	8	3	1	4	12	13	−1	10	Qualification to Semi-finals
3	Khasab	8	1	2	5	5	16	−11	5	

Rules for classification: 1) points; 2) goal difference; 3) number of goals scored.

=== Clubs season-progress ===
Win
Draw
Lose

Team ╲ Round	1	2	3	4	5	6	7	8
Al-Salam	L	L	L	W	W	D	L	W
Dibba	W	W	W	D	L	W	W	W
Khasab	W	L	L	D	D	L	L	L

Updated to match(es) played on 22 January 2016. Source: Clubs Season-Progress

== Semifinals ==
4 teams played a knockout tie. 2 ties were played over two legs. The first match was played between Al-Wusta Club and Al-Salam SC on 19 April 2015. Bidia SC and Al-Salam SC earned promotion to Oman First Division League on winning their respective Semi-finals ties.

=== 1st Legs ===
5 February 2016	Al-Wusta	0 - 0	Al-Salam
16:00 UTC+4

5 February 2016	Dibba	0 - 0	Bidia
18:30 UTC+4

=== 2nd Legs ===
12 February 2016	Bidia	2 - 0	Dibba
18:30 UTC+4

12 February 2016	Al-Salam	2 - 1	Al-Wusta
18:45 UTC+4

== Third place play-off ==
Dibba Club and Al-Wusta Club after losing their respective ties in the Semi-finals played the Third place play off match on 26 February 2016 at the Nizwa Sports Complex

26 February 2016	Dibba	0 - 3	Al-Wusta	Nizwa Sports Complex
16:00 UTC+4

== Finals ==
Al-Salam SC and Bidia SC after winning their respective ties in the Semi-finals played the finals of the 2015-16 Oman Second Division League on 26 February 2016 at the Nizwa Sports Complex

26 February 2016	Al-Salam	1 - 2	Bidia	Nizwa Sports Complex
19:15 UTC+4

== OFA Awards ==
Oman Football Association awarded the following awards for the 2015–16 Oman Second Division League season.

- Top Scorer: Idrees Al-Idrisi (Al-Wusta)
- Best Player: Fahad Al-Zaabi (Al-Salam)
- Best Goalkeeper: Abdullah Al-Harthy (Bidia)
- Best Coach: Mohammed Sabah (Bidia)
- Best Team Manager: Tariq Al-Junaibi (Al-Wusta)
- Fair Play Award: Al-Ittifaq Club

== See also ==
- 2015–16 Oman Professional League
- 2015–16 Sultan Qaboos Cup
- 2015–16 Oman First Division League
