= Birane Ndoye =

Senegalese footballer

Personal information
- Date of birth: 4 April 1994 (age 32)
- Place of birth: Senegal
- Height: 1.80 m (5 ft 11 in)
- Position: Defender

Team information
- Current team: Al-Salam

Senior career*
Years	Team	Apps	(Gls)
2013–2016	Niarry Tally		
2017	Slavia Mozyr	22	(3)
2018–2020	Port Autonome		
2020–2022	Niarry Tally		
2023–	Al-Salam		
- * Club domestic league appearances and goals as of 26 December 2017

Birane Ndoye (born 4 April 1994) is a Senegalese professional footballer who plays for Al-Salam.

He is a younger brother of former Senegal international player Issa Ndoye, who played alongside Birane for Slavia Mozyr.
