= Lyle Peters =

South African footballer (born 1991)

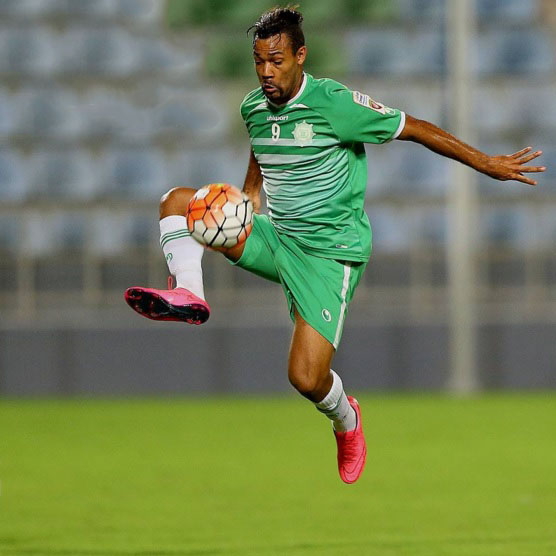
- Peters in action with Al-Oruba in 2015

Personal information
- Date of birth: 9 February 1991 (age 35)
- Place of birth: Cape Town, South Africa
- Height: 1.81 m (5 ft 11 in)
- Position: Striker

Team information
- Current team: Al-Oruba
- Number: 9

Youth career
- 1996–2003: Strandfontein AFC
- 2003–2004: Fortune
- 2004–2006: Strandfontein AFC
- 2006–2009: Bidvest Wits

Senior career*
Years	Team	Apps	(Gls)
2009–2011	Ajax Cape Town	?	(?)
2011	Santos	?	(?)
2012	African Warriors	?	(?)
2012–2013	Bay Stars	?	(?)
2013–2014	Ikapa Sporting	?	(?)
2014–2015	ASD Cape Town	?	(?)
2015–2016	Al-Oruba	40	(60)
- * Club domestic league appearances and goals

Lyle Peters commonly known as Lala's (born 9 February 1991) is a South African soccer player who plays for Al-Oruba SC in Oman Professional League.

== Club career ==
=== Youth career ===
Born and raised in Cape Town, South Africa, Lyle began his footballing career at the age of 5 with the junior level teams of Strandfontein-based, Strandfontein AFC in 1996. In 2003, he signed a one-year contract with Kuils River-based, F.C. Fortune. In 2004, he moved back to Strandfontein and his former club, Strandfontein AFC. In 2006, he signed a long-term contract with Johannesburg-based, Bidvest Wits F.C.

=== South Africa ===
Lyle began his professional footballing career in 2009 with Parow-based, Premier Soccer League club, Ajax Cape Town F.C. In 2011, he moved to Ladsdowne where he signed a short-term contract with SAFA Second Division club, Santos F.C. In 2012, he moved to Phuthaditjhaba where he signed a short-term contract with National First Division club, African Warriors F.C. Later in the year 2012, he signed a six-month contract with another SAFA Second Division club, Port Elizabeth-based, Bay Stars F.C. In 2013, he signed a one-year contract with SAFA Second Division club, Ikapa Sporting F.C. In 2014, he signed a one-year contract with ASD Cape Town.

=== Oman ===
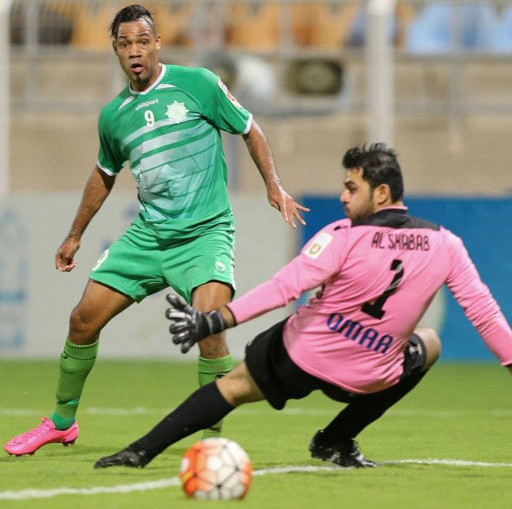
Lyle Peters scoring against Al-Shabab Club

Al-Oruba SC

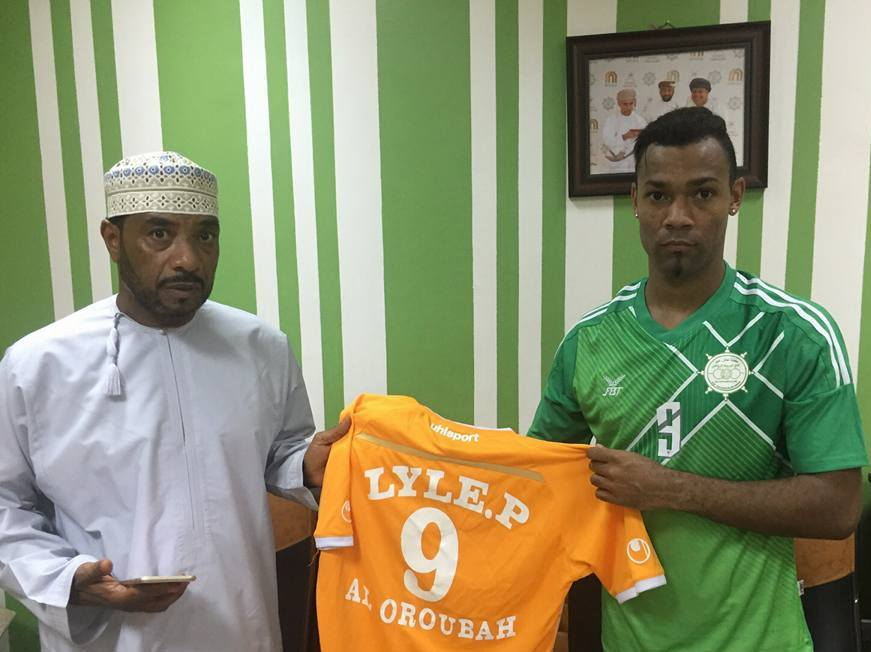
Al-Oruba SC

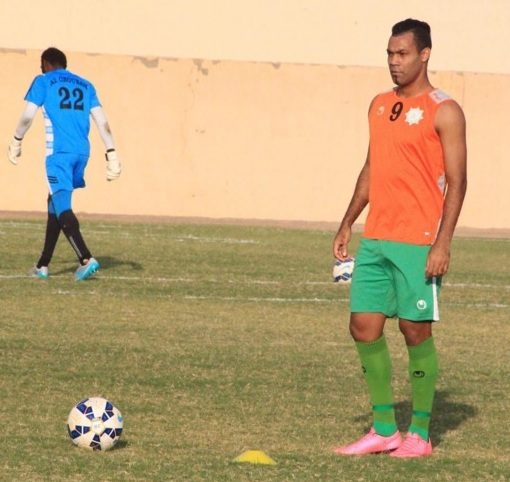
Training

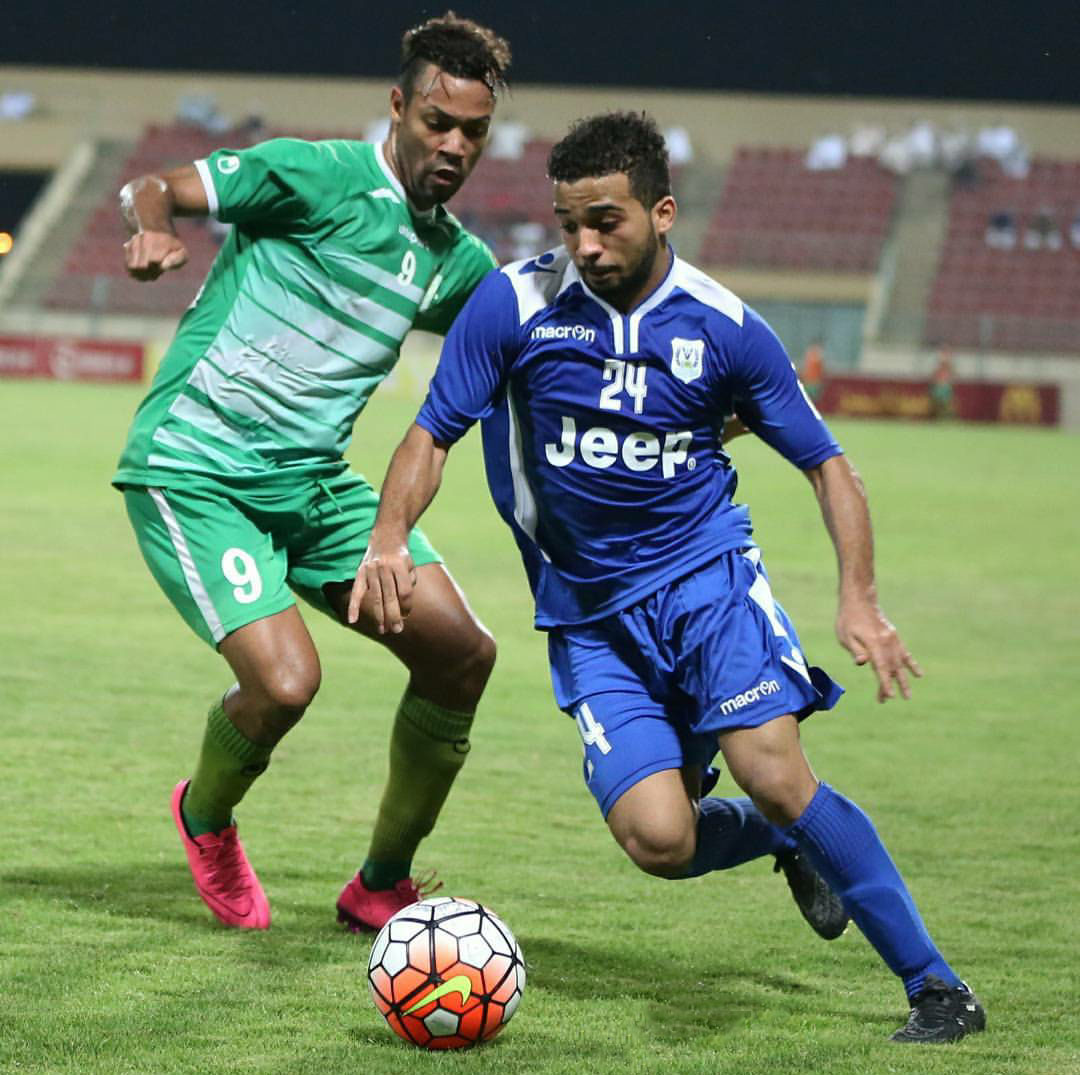
Against Al-Nasr S.C.S.C.

He first moved out of South Africa in 2015 to the Middle East and more accurately to Oman where on 3 September 2015, he signed a one-year contract with Sur-based, Oman Professional League club, Al-Oruba SC. He made his debut for the club on 8 September 2015 in a 1–1 draw against Muscat Club in the 2015–16 Oman Professional League Cup. He made his Oman Professional League debut on 13 September 2015 in a 3–1 win over newly promoted side, Salalah SC and also assisted the third and final goal of the match which was scored by former Omani international, Mohammed Taqi Al-Lawati and scored his first goal on 27 November 2015 in a 2–0 win over Al-Nahda Club. He scored his first goal for the club on 18 November 2015 in a 2–1 win over Muscat Club in the 2015–16 Oman Professional League Cup. He made his Sultan Qaboos Cup debut and scored his first goal in the competition on 30 December 2015 in a 2–1 win over fierce rivals, Sur SC. He also made his AFC Cup debut on 24 February 2016 in a 2–1 win over Al-Wahda SC of Syria.

=== Club career statistics ===
Club	Season	Division	League		Cup		Continental (Note: Includes goals and appearances in the AFC Cup)		Other		Total	
Club	Season	Division	Apps	Goals	Apps	Goals	Apps	Goals	Apps	Goals	Apps	Goals
Al-Oruba	2015–16	Oman Professional League	25	6	6	2	5	1	0	0	36	9
Al-Oruba	Total		25	6	6	2	5	1	0	0	36	9
Career total			25	6	6	2	5	1	0	0	36	9
