= Oman Volleyball League =

- Current season, competition or edition: 2025–26 Omani League
- Sport: Volleyball
- First season: 1980; 46 years ago
- Administrator: OVA
- No. of teams: 9 teams
- Country: Oman
- Confederation: AVC
- Continent: Asia
- Most recent champion: Al-Seeb Club (15th titles) (2025–26)
- Most titles: Al-Seeb Club (15 titles)
- Level on pyramid: Level 1
- Relegation to: National 2
- Domestic cups: Omani Cup; Omani Super Cup
- International cups: AVC Champions League; Arab Clubs Championship

The Oman Volleyball League ( Arabic : الدوري العماني لكرة الطائرة ) is the highest level of men's volleyball in Oman Since 1980/81 and it is organized by the Oman Volleyball Association. The Oman Volleyball League is currently contested by 9 clubs around the country as of the last season Played 2025–26.

The League played as a regular season by a total of 9 teams, playing each other twice, once at home and once away from home. After that in the final regular season ranking the best 4 teams will advance to the Semi playing each other best of 3 games, in the Final as well three match games will be played to define the champions.

== Teams by Titles ==
Rank	Club	Titles
1	Al-Seeb Club	15
2	Sohar SC	11
3	Oman Club	8
4	Al-Salam SC	5
5	Saham Club	4
6	Majees Club	2
7	AlKamil & AlWafi Club	1

== Winners list ==
Season	Champions	Runners-up	Third place
2025–26	Al-Seeb Club	Al Bashaer Club	Majees Club
2024–25	Al-Seeb Club	Al-Salam SC	Al Shabab Club
2023–24	Al-Seeb Club	Al-Salam SC	?
2022–23	Al-Seeb Club	Oman Club	Al Bashaer Club
2021–22	AlKamil & AlWafi Club	Al-Seeb Club	Oman Club
2020–21	Al-Salam SC	AlKamil & AlWafi Club	Al-Seeb Club
2019–20	Al-Salam SC	AlKamil & AlWafi Club	Al-Seeb Club
2018–19	Al-Seeb Club	Al-Salam SC	Sohar SC
2017–18	Al-Salam SC	Sohar SC	Al-Seeb Club
2016–17	Al-Salam SC	Al-Seeb Club	Sohar SC
2015–16	Al-Salam SC	Sohar SC	Saham Club
2014–15	Sohar SC	Saham Club	Al-Seeb Club
2013–14	Saham Club	Al-Seeb Club	Sohar SC
2012–13	Saham Club	Al-Seeb Club	Sohar SC
2011–12	Al-Seeb Club	Saham Club	Al Bashaer Club
2010–11	Saham Club	Sohar SC	Al-Seeb Club
2009–10	Saham Club	Al-Seeb Club	Sohar SC
2008–09	Sohar SC	Saham Club	Al Bashaer Club
2007–08	Al-Seeb Club	Al-Salam SC	Sohar SC
2006–07	Sohar SC	Al-Seeb Club	Al-Salam SC
2005–06	Sohar SC	Al-Seeb Club	Majees Club
2004–05	Sohar SC	Al-Seeb Club	Al-Salam SC
2003–04	Sohar SC	Majees Club	Al-Seeb Club
2002–03	Al-Seeb Club	Majees Club	Sohar SC
2001–02	Sohar SC	Majees Club	Bahla Club
2000–01	Sohar SC	Saham Club	Majees Club
1999–00	Sohar SC	Majees Club	Al-Seeb Club
1998–99	Sohar SC	Majees Club	Al-Seeb Club
1997–98	Majees Club	Al-Seeb Club	Sohar SC
1996–97	Al-Seeb Club	Saham Club	Sohar SC
1995–96	Al-Seeb Club	Saham Club	Sohar SC
1994–95	Sohar SC	Al-Seeb Club	Saham Club
1993–94	Al-Seeb Club	Saham Club	Majees Club
1992–93	Al-Seeb Club	Saham Club	Sohar SC
1991–92	Majees Club	Al-Seeb Club	Sohar SC
1990–91	Al-Seeb Club	Majees Club	Oman Club
1989–90	Al-Seeb Club	Majees Club	Saham Club
1988–89	Al-Seeb Club	Saham Club	Majees Club
1987–88	Oman Club	Al Nahda Club	Saham Club
1986–87	Oman Club	Al Nahda Club	Al-Seeb Club
1985–86	Oman Club	Dhofar Club	Sohar SC
1984–85	Oman Club	?	?
1983–84	Oman Club	?	?
1982–83	Oman Club	?	?
1981–82	Oman Club	?	?
1980–81	Oman Club	?	?

Sources :
