= Mark Harrison (footballer) =

English footballer and manager (born 1960)

Personal information
- Full name: Mark Simon Harrison
- Date of birth: 11 December 1960 (age 65)
- Place of birth: Derby, England
- Height: 6 ft 0 in (1.83 m)
- Position: Goalkeeper

Senior career*
Years	Team	Apps	(Gls)
1977–1979	Southampton	0	(0)
1979–1982	Port Vale	70	(0)
1981	→ Stoke City (loan)	0	(0)
1982–1984	Stoke City	7	(0)
1984–1985	Hellenic	44	(0)
1985–1987	Kettering Town	42	(0)
1987–1988	Stafford Rangers	50	(0)
1988–1989	Telford United	12	(0)
1989	Hellenic	8	(0)
Total		233	(0)

Managerial career
- 1994–1995: Stafford Rangers
- 2000–2001: Bangladesh
- 2001–2002: Fortune
- 2002–2003: Hurriya
- 2010–2011: Mpumalanga Black Aces
- 2011–2012: African Warriors
- 2012–2013: Bay Stars
- 2013: Chippa United
- 2013–2014: Golden Arrows
- 2015: CAPS United
- 2015–2017: Township Rollers
- 2017–2018: Harare City (technical director)
- 2018–2019: Harare City
- 2020–2021: Highlanders
- 2021–2022: Gor Mahia
- 2022–2023: Mighty Wanderers (technical director)
- * Club domestic league appearances and goals

Mark Simon Harrison (born 11 December 1960) is an English professional football manager and former footballer.

He was a goalkeeper in the English Football League for Port Vale and Stoke City, and also played non-League football for Hellenic, Kettering Town, Stafford Rangers, and Telford United. He managed Stafford Rangers for a brief spell, and then from 2000, he began coaching clubs and nations in Asia and Africa, including the Bangladesh national team, Fortune, Hurriya, Mpumalanga Black Aces, African Warriors, Bay Stars, Chippa United, Golden Arrows, CAPS United, and Township Rollers. In the 2015–16 season, he led Township Rollers to the Botswana Premier League title and the final of the Mascom Top 8 Cup before he was appointed technical director at South African side Baroka in January 2017. In July 2017, he joined the Zimbabwean Premier Soccer League team Harare City as technical director and was promoted to manager a year later. He was appointed as head coach of Highlanders in January 2020. In August 2021, he was appointed as manager of the Kenyan Premier League team Gor Mahia. He was appointed technical director at Malawi's Mighty Wanderers in September 2022.

== Playing career ==
Harrison was a trainee with Southampton, before joining John McGrath's Fourth Division side Port Vale in February 1980. He was immediately the first choice keeper for the "Valiants", however, was troubled by cartilage problems from November 1980. In the summer of 1981 he was loaned to rivals Stoke City as they played a youth tournament. After returning to Vale Park he was an ever-present for the 46 game 1981–82 season. He was sold to City, along with Mark Chamberlain, for a combined fee of £180,000 in August 1982. He left Victoria Ground in 1984 due to long-term injury problems.

After he left the "Potters", he not only left Stoke-on-Trent but England as well, as he switched to South African side Hellenic. He later returned to England to play non-League football with Kettering Town, Stafford Rangers and Telford United. Harrison later returned to South Africa to play for Hellenic for a second time.

== Management career ==
Upon his retirement, he returned to England. He became the youth coach of Bristol City, then goalkeeper coach of Everton, before becoming coach and assistant manager of Barrow, later player-manager of Stafford Rangers and then the reserve team coach and assistant manager of Oxford United. Harrison gained his UEFA A licence at the age of 33.

He later had a spell as coach of the Bangladesh national football team. He then went on to manage Fortune in the South African NFD and later Hurriya in the Maldives. He was also employed to assist Mpumalanga Black Aces in the South African Premier Soccer League in 2011. He was promoted to head coach for the remainder of the 2010–11 season but departed the club at the end of the campaign. He went on to coach African Warriors in the National First Division. Harrison took up the job as head coach of Bay Stars, in South Africa's third tier, the SAFA Second Division for the 2012–13 season. However, he left during the season to join Chippa United.

Harrison was appointed head coach of Chippa United in April 2013 but despite not losing a game, was unable to prevent the team from being relegated at the end of the 2012–13 season. He resigned from his position after four games in 2013–14 season. He became head coach of Golden Arrows on 7 October 2013. In January 2015 he was appointed head coach of Zimbabwean club CAPS United. Harrison resigned on 16 June 2015. On the same day, he was announced as the head coach of Botswana Premier League side Township Rollers. He led the Rollers to the league title in controversial circumstances 2015–16, as the Botswana Football Association deducted the club ten points for fielding an ineligible player before the ruling was overturned on appeal. They also reached the final of the Mascom Top 8 Cup, where they lost 3–1 to Orapa United.

Harrison left Township Rollers, after 18 months in charge, and decided that it was time to make the move to South Africa, bemoaning people in Botswana that "really make it hard to do things". He subsequently became the new technical director at Baroka, his 11th different club in six years working in African football. In July 2017, he joined the Zimbabwe Premier Soccer League team Harare City as technical director. Harare won the Cup of Zimbabwe in 2017 with a 3–1 victory over How Mine. In 2018, he became the manager of the club and was joined by his son Ryan Harrison, who joined the club as a goalkeeper. On 8 January 2020, he was appointed as head coach of Zimbabwe Premier Soccer League rivals Highlanders on a two-year contract.

On 1 August 2021, Harrison was appointed as manager at Kenyan Premier League team Gor Mahia. He attempted to instill an attacking style of play into the team. However, he was sacked on 29 January 2022. On 27 September 2022, Harrison was appointed as technical director at Super League of Malawi club Mighty Wanderers on a two-year contract; the club were 15 points behind league leaders Nyasa Big Bullets at the time of his appointment. He quit the club following a third place finish to the 2023 Super League of Malawi season, reportedly with the intention of returning to England.

== Personal life ==
He dated broadcaster and television presenter Fiona Phillips in the 1980s.

== Career statistics ==
Appearances and goals by club, season and competition
Club	Season	League			FA Cup		League Cup		Total	
Club	Season	Division	Apps	Goals	Apps	Goals	Apps	Goals	Apps	Goals
Port Vale	1980–81	Fourth Division	24	0	1	0	0	0	25	0
Port Vale	1981–82	Fourth Division	46	0	5	0	4	0	55	0
Port Vale	Total		70	0	6	0	4	0	80	0
Stoke City	1982–83	First Division	7	0	0	0	1	0	8	0

== Honours ==
Township Rollers

- Botswana Premier League: 2015–16
- Mascom Top 8 Cup runner-up: 2016

== See also ==
- List of Bangladesh national football team managers
