= Mechac Koffi =

Ivorian professional footballer (born 1988)

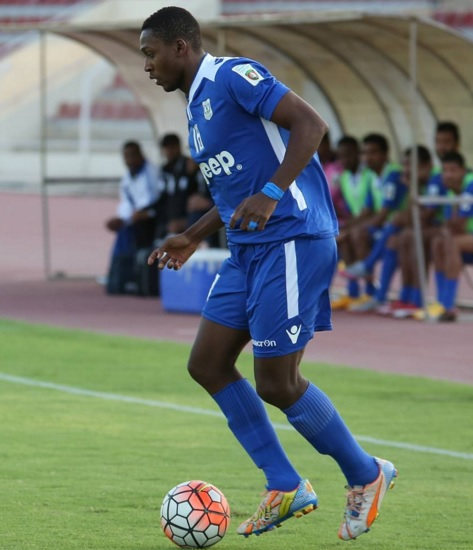
- Mechac with Al-Nasr in 2016

Personal information
- Date of birth: 24 September 1988 (age 38)
- Place of birth: Bouna, Ivory Coast
- Height: 1.82 m (6 ft 0 in)
- Position: Striker

Youth career
- 2006–2008: AS Denguélé

Senior career*
Years	Team	Apps	(Gls)
2008–2011	OC Khouribga	28	(3)
2011–2012	AS Khroub	20	(2)
2012–2013	ES Sétif	10	(1)
2013–2014	RC Arbaâ	0	(0)
2014	Ismaily	5	(1)
2014–2015	Al-Nasr	25	(19)
2015–2016	Ittihad Kalba	5	(3)
2016	Al-Nasr	10	(4)
2016–2017	Al-Shabab	9	(9)
2017	Al-Feiha	12	(3)
2018–2019	Churchill Brothers	10	(4)
2019–2020	Al-Taawon		
2020–2021	Masafi	7	(2)
- * Club domestic league appearances and goals

Mechac Koffi (born 24 September 1988) is an Ivorian professional footballer who plays as a striker.

== Club career ==
=== Morocco ===
Mechac began his professional career in 2009 in Morocco with OC Khouribga in Botola (Moroccan top division league). He scored 14 goals in 28 appearances for the Moroccan side.

=== Algeria ===
On 1 July 2011, he moved to Algeria and signed a one-year contract with AS Khroub of Algerian Ligue Professionnelle 1. He scored 13 goals in 20 league appearances for the Algerian side. On 6 August 2012, he again signed a one-year contract with an Algerian club, ES Sétif of the Algerian Ligue Professionnelle 1. He scored 2 goals in 11 appearances for the Sétif-based club. On 17 June 2013, he signed a six-months contract with an Algerian Ligue Professionnelle 1 club, RC Arbaâ.

=== Egypt ===
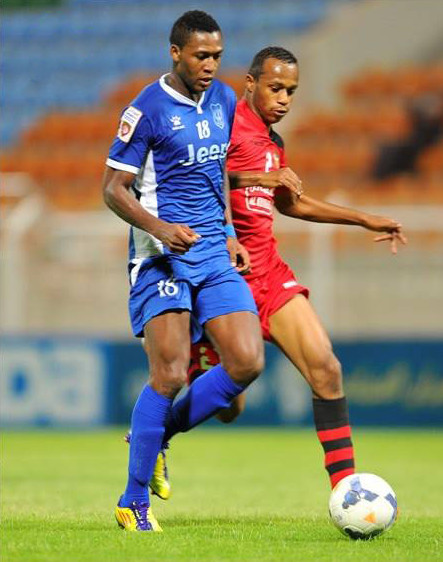
Mechac Koffi – 2014–15 Oman Professional League

After spending a three-years spell in Algeria, he moved to Egypt and signed a contract with Ismaily SC of the Egyptian Premier League. He scored 4 goal in 5 appearances for the Ismaïlia-based club.

=== Oman ===
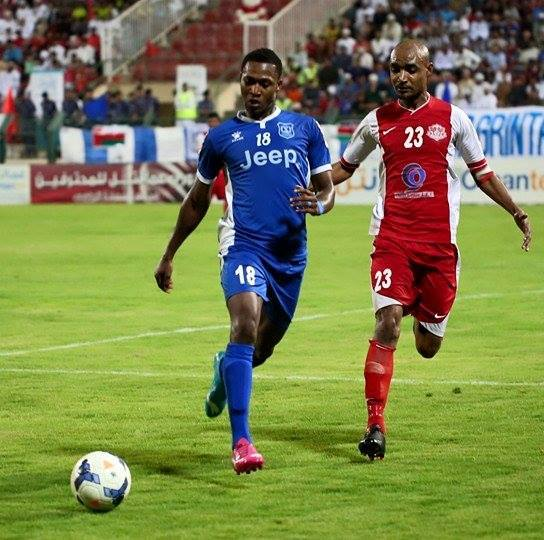
Mechac Koffi – 2014–15 Oman Professional League

On 23 July 2014, he arrived in Oman and on 6 August 2014 he signed a two-years contract with Salalah-based club Al-Nasr S.C.S.C. He made his Oman Professional League debut and scored his first goal on 20 September 2014 in a 3–2 loss in the derby match against fierce rivals, Dhofar S.C.S.C. He scored 19 goals in 25 appearances in the 2014–15 Oman Professional League which also included a hat-trick on 8 January 2015 in a 4–2 win over eventual runners-up of the 2014–15 Professional League season, Fanja SC, thus emerging as the top scorer of the 2014–15 Oman Professional League season. He also made an appearance and scored a goal in the 2014–15 Oman Professional League Cup. He scored 5 goals in 6 appearances in the 2014–15 Sultan Qaboos Cup, thus emerging as the top scorer and he also helped his team reach the semi-finals of the competition where his side lost 2–1 on aggregate to the eventual winners of the 2014–15 Sultan Qaboos Cup and also the 2014–15 Oman Professional League, Al-Oruba SC.

=== United Arab Emirates ===
On 27 May 2015, he arrived in the United Arab Emirates and on the very next day he signed a two-year contract with UAE First Division League side, Ittihad Kalba SC. He made his debut for the club on 24 October 2015 in a 1–1 draw against Hatta Club in the UAE League Cup and scored his first goal for the club in the same competition on 14 November 2015 in a 3–1 win over Dibba Al-Hisn Sports Club. He made his UAE First Division League debut and scored his first goal in the competition on 11 December 2015 in a 1–1 draw against Al-Urooba.

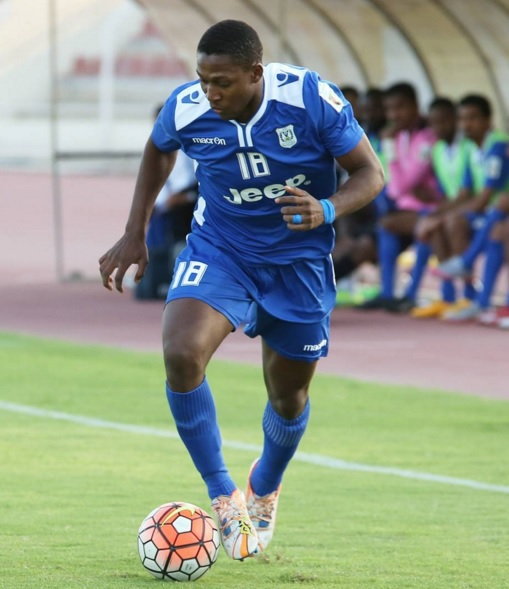
Mechac Koffi – 2015–16 Oman Professional League

=== Back to Oman ===
In January 2016, news speculated that the Ivorian striker could make a move back to Oman with clubs like Al-Suwaiq Club, Al-Nahda Club and his former side, Al-Nasr being the potential destinations. As a result, on 28 January 2016, he moved back to Oman and on the very same day signed a short-term contract with his former side, Al-Nasr until the end of the 2015–16 Oman Professional League season. He made his first appearance in the 2015–16 Oman Professional League on 31 January 2016 in a 1–0 loss against Al-Oruba SC and scored his first goal on 4 February 2016 in a 1–0 win over relegation threatened Al-Khaboura SC. He scored 1 goal in 2 appearances in the 2015–16 Oman Professional League Cup, helping his side win the title for the first time in the history of the club. He made his first appearance in the 2015–16 Sultan Qaboos Cup on 15 February 2016 in a 0–1 loss against Fanja SC and scored a brace in a 2–1 win against the same side in the 2nd leg of the Quarter-finals, helping his side qualify for the semi-finals where Al-Nasr lost 1–0 on aggregate to Saham Club.

On 20 July 2016, he signed a one-year contract with another Oman Professional League club, Al-Shabab Club.

=== India ===
In December 2017, he moved to India and signed a short-term contract with Goan giants, Churchill Brothers S.C. He made his I-League debut and scored his first goal in the competition on 8 January in a 1–1 draw against Indian club East Bengal F.C. and helped his side secure their first point of the season.

== Personal life ==
Mechac has three brothers and has one younger sister. He has already lost a sister who was older than him back in 2012. His elder brother, Yao Simon Koffi is also a player.

== Career statistics ==
=== Club ===
As of ?

Club	Season	Division	League		Cup		Continental		Other		Total	
Club	Season	Division	Apps	Goals	Apps	Goals	Apps	Goals	Apps	Goals	Apps	Goals
OC Khouribga	2009–10	Botola	14	1	0	0	0	0	0	0	14	1
OC Khouribga	2010–11	Botola	14	2	0	0	0	0	0	0	14	2
OC Khouribga	Total		28	3	0	0	0	0	0	4	28	3
AS Khroub	2011–12	Algerian Ligue Professionnelle 1	20	2	0	0	0	0	0	0	20	2
ES Sétif	2012–13	Algerian Ligue Professionnelle 1	10	1	1	0	0	0	0	0	11	1
Ismaily	2013–14	Egyptian Premier League	5	1	1	0	0	0	0	0	6	1
Al-Nasr	2014–15	Oman Professional League	25	19	7	6	0	0	0	0	32	25
Ittihad Kalba	2015–16	UAE First Division League	5	3	5	1	0	0	0	0	10	4
Al-Nasr	2015–16	Oman Professional League	10	4	6	3	0	0	0	0	16	7
Al-Shabab	2016–17	Oman Professional League	9	4	0	0	0	0	0	0	9	4
Al-Feiha	2016–17	Saudi First Division	9	3	0	0	0	0	0	0	9	3
Churchill Brothers	2017–18	I-League	9	4	0	0	0	0	0	0	9	4
Career total			128	44	20	10	0	0	0	0	156	54

== Honours ==
ES Sétif

- Algerian Ligue Professionnelle 1: 2012–13

Al-Nasr

- Oman Professional League Cup: 2015–16

Individual

- Oman Professional League top scorer: 2014–15 Oman Professional League
- Sultan Qaboos Cup top scorer: 2014–15 Sultan Qaboos Cup
