= Yao Simon Koffi =

Ivorian footballer

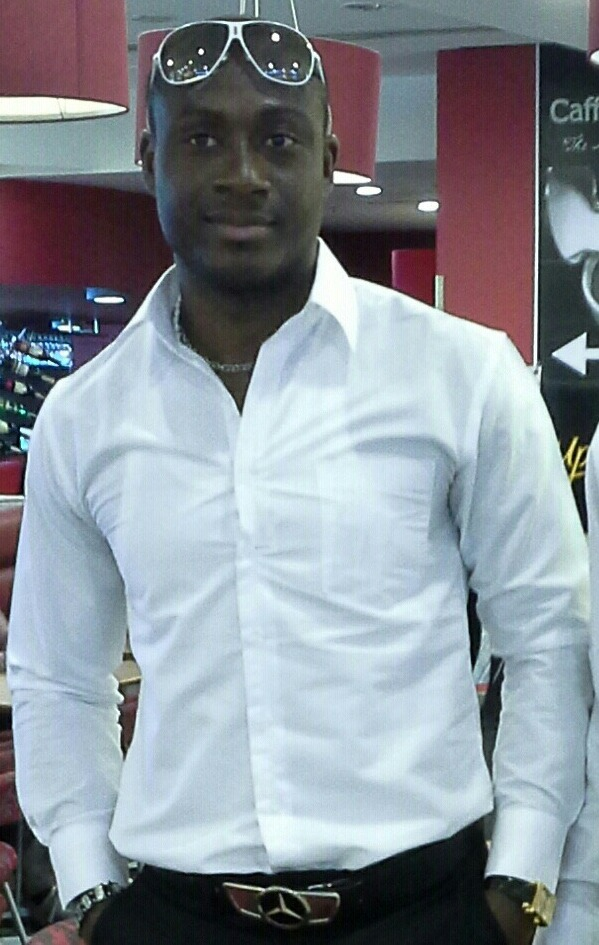
- Yao Simon Koffi in 2012

Personal information
- Date of birth: October 28, 1982 (age 44)
- Place of birth: Bondoukou, Ivory Coast
- Height: 1.81 m (5 ft 11 in)
- Position: Defensive midfielder

Youth career
- 1997–1999: Mimosas
- 1999–2000: Sacraboutou Sport de Bondoukou

Senior career*
Years	Team	Apps	(Gls)
2000–2001	Sabé Sports de Bouna		
2001–2002	CA Bizertin		
2002–2003	Gafsa		
2003–2005	Hammam-Sousse		
2005–2006	Jendouba		
2006–2007	Kasserine		
2007–2008	Beni-Khalled		
2008–2009	M'saken		
2009–2010	Al-Afriqi Darnah		
2010–2011	Salam Sour		
2011	Monastir		
2012	Al-Urooba		
2012–2013	Al-Khartoum Al-Watani		
2013–2014	Hilal Al-Fasher		
2014	Mons Claudius		
- * Club domestic league appearances and goals

Yao Simon Koffi (born 28 October 1982) is an Ivorian footballer.

== Club career ==
=== Youth career ===
Yao Simon began his footballing career in 1997 in Ivory Coast with Abidjan-based club, ASEC Mimosas. In 1999, he moved back to his home town, Bondoukou where he played for Sacraboutou Sport de Bondoukou for one year.

=== Ivory Coast ===
Yao Simon began his professional footballing career in Ivory Coast in 2000 with Bouna-based club, Sabé Sports de Bouna. He made appearances in the 2000–01 Ligue 1 and the 2001–02 Tunisian Cup.

=== Tunisia ===
He first moved out of Ivory Coast in 2001 to North Africa and more accurately to Tunisia where he signed a one-year contract with Bizerte-based club, CA Bizertin. He made appearances in the 2001–02 Tunisian Ligue Professionnelle 1 and the 2001–02 Tunisian Cup for the Bizerte-based club.

In 2002, he moved to Gafsa where he signed a one-year contract with another Tunisian Ligue Professionnelle 1 club, EGS Gafsa. He made appearances in the 2002–03 Tunisian Ligue Professionnelle 1 and the 2002–03 Tunisian Cup.

In 2003, he moved to Hammam Sousse where he signed a two-year contract with another Tunisian Ligue Professionnelle 1 club, ES Hammam-Sousse.

In 2005, he moved to Jendouba where he signed a one-year contract with another Tunisian Ligue Professionnelle 1 club, Jendouba Sport. He made appearances in the 2005–06 Tunisian Ligue Professionnelle 1 and the 2005–06 Tunisian Cup.

In 2006, he moved to Kasserine where he signed a one-year contract with another Tunisian Ligue Professionnelle 1 club, AS Kasserine. He made appearances in the 2006–07 Tunisian Ligue Professionnelle 1.

In 2007, he moved to Béni Khalled where he signed a one-year contract with another Tunisian Ligue Professionnelle 1 club, ES Beni-Khalled. He made appearances in the 2007–08 Tunisian Ligue Professionnelle 1 and the 2007–08 Tunisian Cup.

In 2008, he moved to M'saken where he signed a one-year contract with another Tunisian Ligue Professionnelle 1 club, CS M'saken. He made appearances in the 2008–09 Tunisian Ligue Professionnelle 1.

=== United Arab Emirates ===
In 2011, he again moved out of Ivory Coast and this time to the Middle East and more accurately to the United Arab Emirates where he signed a six-month contract with UAE First Division League club, Al-Urooba. He made his UAE First Division League debut on 29 January 2012 in a 1–0 loss against Al-Khaleej Club.

=== Libya ===
In 2009, he again moved out to a North African country and this time to Libya where he signed a one-year contract with Club Africain Libya.

=== Lebanon ===
In 2010, he moved to Western Asia and more accurately to Lebanon where he signed a one-year contract with Tyre-based, Salam Sour.

=== Back to Tunisia ===
In 2011, he moved back to Tunisia and more accurately to Monastir where he signed a one-year contract with US Monastir. He did not make any official appearance for the Monastir-based club.

=== Sudan ===
In 2012, he moved back to North Africa and more accurately to Sudan where he signed a one-year contract with capital city, Khartoum-based, Al-Khartoum Al-Watani SC. He made appearances in the 2013 Sudan Premier League and also the 2013 Sudan Cup.

In 2013, he moved to Al-Fashir where he signed a two-year contract with Sudan Premier League club, Al-Hilal Al-Fasher ESC.

== Personal life ==
Yao Simon has three brothers and has one younger sister. He has already lost a sister who was older than him back in 2012. His younger brother Mechac Koffi is also a player. He is married and lives with his wife and son in Slovenia.
