= Ahmed Manaa Al-Noobi =

Omani footballer (born 1988)

Ahmed Manaa
Personal information
- Full name: Ahmed Mana Jamaan Al-Noobi
- Date of birth: 9 April 1988 (age 38)
- Place of birth: Salalah, Oman
- Height: 1.63 m (5 ft 4 in)
- Position: Attacking midfielder

Team information
- Current team: Dhofar
- Number: 19

Youth career
- 2002–2006: Dhofar

Senior career*
Years	Team	Apps	(Gls)
2006–2014	Dhofar	?	(10)
2014–	Al-Nasr		

International career
2007–	Oman	6	(1)
- * Club domestic league appearances and goals

Ahmed Manaa Al-Noobi (Arabic: احمد مانع النوبي; born 9 April 1988), commonly known as Ahmed Manaa, is an Omani footballer who plays for Dhofar S.C.S.C. in Oman Professional League.

== Club career ==
On 7 June 2014, he signed a one-year contract with Salalah based club, rivals of his former club Dhofar S.C.S.C., Al-Nasr S.C.S.C.

=== Club career statistics ===
Club	Season	Division	League		Cup		Continental (Note: Includes appearances in the AFC Cup)		Other		Total	
Club	Season	Division	Apps	Goals	Apps	Goals	Apps	Goals	Apps	Goals	Apps	Goals
Dhofar	2009–10	Oman Professional League	-	1	-	2	0	0	-	0	-	3
Dhofar	2010–11	Oman Professional League	-	1	-	0	0	0	-	0	-	1
Dhofar	2011–12	Oman Professional League	-	1	-	1	0	0	-	0	-	2
Dhofar	2012–13	Oman Professional League	-	2	-	1	5	1	-	0	-	4
Dhofar	2013–14	Oman Professional League	-	5	-	1	0	0	-	0	-	6
Dhofar	Total		-	10	-	5	5	1	-	0	-	16
Career total			-	10	-	5	5	1	-	0	-	16

== International career ==
Ahmed was selected for the national team for the first time in 2007. Ahmed made his first appearance for Oman on 26 March 2008 against Thailand in the third round of 2010 FIFA World Cup qualification. He has made appearances in the 2011 AFC Asian Cup qualification and in the 2010 FIFA World Cup qualification and has represented the national team in the 19th Arabian Gulf Cup.

=== Goals for Senior National Team ===
Scores and results list Oman's goal tally first.

#	Date	Venue	Opponent	Score	Result	Competition
1	18 May 2010	Ali Mohsen Al-Muraisi Stadium, Sana‘a, Yemen	Yemen	1-0	1-0	Friendly

== Honours ==
=== Club ===
- With Dhofar

- Omani League (0): Runner-up 2007–08, 2008–09, 2009–10
- Sultan Qaboos Cup (2): 2006, 2011; Runner-up 2009
- Omani Federation Cup (1): 2012
- Oman Super Cup (0): Runner-up 2012

=== National team ===
- Arabian Gulf Cup (1): 2009
