= Ryan Harrison (footballer, born 1985) =

English footballer

Personal information
- Full name: Ryan Lee Harrison
- Date of birth: 6 December 1985 (age 40)
- Place of birth: Northampton, England
- Position: Goalkeeper

Youth career
- Sheffield United
- Oxford United
- Santos Cape Town
- Swansea City

Senior career*
Years	Team	Apps	(Gls)
2001–2004	Swansea City	25	(0)
2004–2005	Canvey Island		
2005	Hastings United	10	(0)
2005	→ Wrexham (loan)	7	(0)
2006–2007	Forest Green Rovers	2	(0)
2007	Havant & Waterlooville	2	
2007–2008	Llanelli	53	(0)
2008	Weston-super-Mare		
2008–2009	Oxford City	35	(0)
2009–2010	Weymouth	38	(0)
2010	Brackley Town	12	(0)
2010–2012	Santos Cape Town	4	(0)
2012–2013	Bidvest Wits	10	(0)
2013	Chippa United	10	(0)
2013–2014	Golden Arrows	4	(0)
2018–2019	Harare City		
- * Club domestic league appearances and goals

Ryan Harrison (born 6 December 1985) is an English football goalkeeper who last played for Harare City in Zimbabwe.

He is the son of Mark Harrison.

== Career ==
In April 2018, Harrison joined Harare City in Zimbabwe on a one-year contract, where his father was working as a technical director and later manager. He decided to leave the club on 1 February 2019.
