= Varel Rozan =

Congolese footballer (born 1992)

Personal information
- Full name: Varel Joviale Rozan
- Date of birth: 9 September 1992 (age 34)
- Place of birth: Pointe-Noire, Congo
- Height: 1.78 m (5 ft 10 in)
- Positions: Right back; centre-back

Team information
- Current team: AS Vita Club

Senior career*
Years	Team	Apps	(Gls)
2011–2012	Étoile du Congo		
2012–2017	KAC Kénitra	76	(2)
2017–2018	AC Léopards		
2018–2019	Diables Noirs		
2019–2020	Étoile du Congo		
2020–2021	AS Otohô		
2021–2023	AS Vita Club		
2023–2024	Naft Al-Wasat		
2024	Al-Wahda		
2024–2025	Al-Nojoom		
2025–	AS Vita Club		

International career^{‡}
2017–	Congo	21	(0)
- * Club domestic league appearances and goals as of 18:16, 25 March 2022 (UTC) ‡ National team caps and goals as of 18:16, 25 March 2022 (UTC)

Varel Joviale Rozan (born 9 September 1992) is a Congolese professional footballer who plays as a right-back, or centre-back for congolese club AS Vita Club and the Congo national team.

== Club career ==
Rozan began his senior career with the local Congolese club Étoile du Congo in 2011. He moved to Morocco with KAC Kénitra in the Botola in 2012, where he stayed until 2017. He returned to the Republic of the Congo, with successive stints at AC Léopards, Diables Noirs, Étoile du Congo, and AS Otohô. On 7 August 2021, he transferred to the DR Congolese club AS Vita Club.

== International career ==
Rozan made his senior debut with the Congo national team in a 0–0 2018 African Nations Championship qualification tie with the DR Congo on 11 August 2017. He was part of the Congo team that played at the 2018 and 2020 African Nations Championships.
