= Jamal Mohamed =

Kenyan footballer (born 1984)

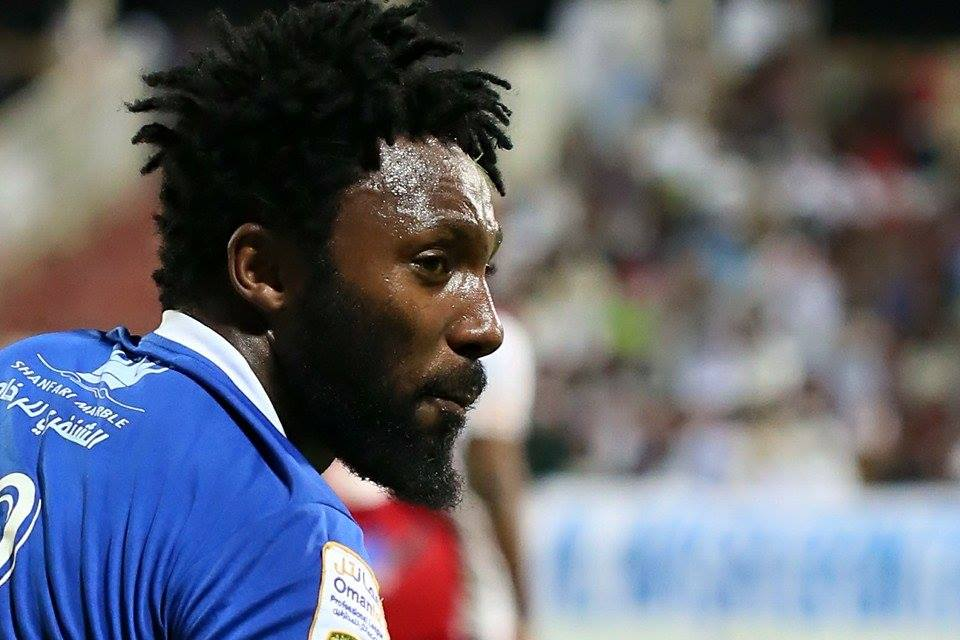
- Mohammed with Al-Nasr in 2015

Personal information
- Date of birth: 24 November 1984 (age 41)
- Place of birth: Nairobi, Kenya
- Height: 1.77 m (5 ft 10 in)
- Position: Midfielder

Youth career
- 1998–2003: MYSA

Senior career*
| Years | Team | Apps | (Gls) |
| | Pumwani United | 3 | (1) |
| | Coffee Board Kenya | 6 | (1) |
| | Mathare United | 7 | (2) |
| 2006 | Liberty Professionals | 2 | (1) |
| 2007–2009 | Enköping | 45 | (4) |
| 2009–2011 | Kazma | 44 | (9) |
| 2011–2012 | Târgu Mureş | 6 | (0) |
| 2012 | Mathare United | 4 | (1) |
| 2012–2013 | Al-Nasr | 9 | (1) |
| 2013–2014 | Dhofar | 12 | (2) |
| 2015– | Al-Nasr | 25 | (2) |

International career
| 2008– | Kenya | 36 | (2) |
- * Club domestic league appearances and goals

Jamal Mohamed (born 24 November 1984), commonly known as Jamal Malo, is a Kenyan footballer who plays for Al-Nasr S.C.S.C. in Oman Professional League.

== Personal life ==
Jamal is known for his off-field style and is considered as Kenya's most stylish footballer.

=== Controversies ===
Prior to the second leg match of 2014 FIFA World Cup qualification between Kenya and Nigeria was photographed partying and smoking shisha while the team was in camp. In the past he had never been involved in any indiscipline cases as reported in a section of the media. “I give my all when in the pitch contrary to what I am reading in a section of the media. I should be judged on what I do in the pitch and I am not the shisha player. I want to humbly thank the coach for having faith in me especially when many could have opted to drop me. My aspiration is to work hard to justify my call up to the National team. When in the team my role is to give my all to get positive results,” he said in reply to the reports in the media.

== Club career ==
=== Youth career ===
Jamal began his footballing career in 1998 with Mathare-based Mathare Youth Sports Association (also known as the MYSA) and played there for the next five years.

=== Liberty Professionals ===
He first moved out of Kenya in 2006 to Ghana where he signed a short-term contract with Accra-based Ghana Premier League club, Liberty Professionals F.C.

=== Enköpings ===
With his great display of skills and set pieces, he caught the attention of various top clubs in the African continent and even a few from Europe one of which was the Swedish club, Enköpings SK. In 2007, he moved to Sweden where he signed a long-term contract with Superettan side, Enköpings SK.

He made 9 appearances for the Enköping-based club in the 2007 Superettan.

He scored 2 goals in 24 appearances in the 2008 Superettan which included a goal on 29 May 2008 in a 2–1 loss against IK Sirius Fotboll and another on 12 July 2008 in a 3–2 win over Falkenbergs FF. In spite of being in top form, Jamal couldn't help the Swedish side avoid relegation to Swedish Football Division 1.

In the 2009 Swedish football Division 1, he scored 2 goals in 12 appearances which included a goal on 3 May 2009 in a 3–2 win over Skellefteå FF and another on 22 June 2009 in a 4–2 loss against Valsta Syrianska IK. In August 2009, the club terminated his contract on a mutual consent.

=== Kazma ===
In 2009, he again moved out of Kenya and this time to the Middle East where he signed a two-year contract with Kuwaiti Premier League club, Kazma SC.

He scored 7 goals in 23 appearances in the 2009–10 Kuwaiti Premier League. He also made a few appearances in the 2010 Kuwait Emir Cup and scored a goal in a 1–1 draw against Al-Sahel SC in the first round in a match which was later won by Kazma 4–1 on penalties which also included a penalty from Jamal. In the 2009–10 season, he also made 9 appearances in the 2010 AFC Cup and helped his side to reach the quarter-finals of the competition where his side 4–2 on aggregate to eventual winners of the competition, Al-Ittihad SC Aleppo of Syria.

He scored 2 goals in 21 appearances in the 2010–11 Kuwaiti Premier League and also scored a goal in a 5–0 win over Khaitan SC in the group stage match of the 2010–11 Kuwaiti Federation Cup. In the 2010–11, he helped his side win the 2011 Kuwait Emir Cup.

=== Târgu Mureş ===
In July 2011, he moved back to Europe and more accurately to Romania where he signed a short-term contract with Liga I side, FCM Tîrgu Mureș. He made his Liga I debut on 30 July 2011 in a 2–0 loss against CFR Cluj. He also made an appearance in the Round of 16 of the 2011–12 Cupa României on 20 September 2011 in a 2–1 loss against FC Oțelul Galați at the Stadionul Oțelul, Galați. He made 6 appearances in the 2011–12 Liga I.

=== Back to Mathare United ===
In December 2011, he moved back to Kenya and on 1 January 2012, he signed a one-year contract with his former and parent club, Mathare United F.C.

During the first leg of the season, Jamal fell out one of Mathare United's coaching staff members over what the coach termed as gross indiscipline which included absconding training sessions. After claims of lacking focus, commitment and drive during the club's training sessions, from the coach, Mathare United F.C.'s management decided to terminate the player's contract thus putting an end to his one-year contract with the Mathare-based club.

While he was at his parent club, Mathare United, news speculated that he would join 2009 Kenyan Premier League champions and fierce rivals, Sofapaka F.C.

There was another speculation of the Kenyan again moving to the Middle East and this time to the United Arab Emirates where he would ply his trade with UAE Pro League side, Al-Nasr SC. However, this deal failed to materialize and as a result, he moved to another Middle Eastern country, Oman.

=== Al-Nasr ===
On 30 August 2012, he arrived in Oman and a few days a later he signed an eight-month contract worth US$80,000 with Oman Elite League side, Al-Nasr S.C.S.C. The midfielder was on radar of the Salalah-based side since a long time and Al-Nasr S.C.S.C.'s Algerian coach, Jiloul Zoheir was with his new acquisition. Algerian coach, Adel Amrouche who had initiated the move was also full of praise for Jamal. He made a number of appearances assisting numerous goals and even scored a goal in the 2012–13 Oman Elite League on 26 November 2012 in a 3–1 win over Al-Nahda Club. He also made a few appearances in country's premier knockout tournament, 2012–13 Sultan Qaboos Cup and also in the 2012–13 Oman Federation Cup in which he also scored a goal in a 4–0 win over another Salalah-based club, Salalah SC. At the end of the season, he was awarded with the "Best Player" of the season award by Al-Nasr S.C.S.C.'s management.

=== Dhofar ===
After a mesmerizing and eye-catching performance with Al-Nasr S.C.S.C., he attracted the attention of various top clubs in the country one of which was fierce rivals of his former club Al-Nasr, Dhofar S.C.S.C. On 27 May 2013, he penned a one-year contract with the Salalah-based club. In the 2013–14 Oman Professional League (first season of Professional League), Jamal assisted a lot of goals for the club and even scored 2 goals which included one on 4 October 2013 in a 4–0 win over Al-Oruba SC and another on 17 December 2013 in a 1–0 win over Sur SC.

=== Back to Al-Nasr ===
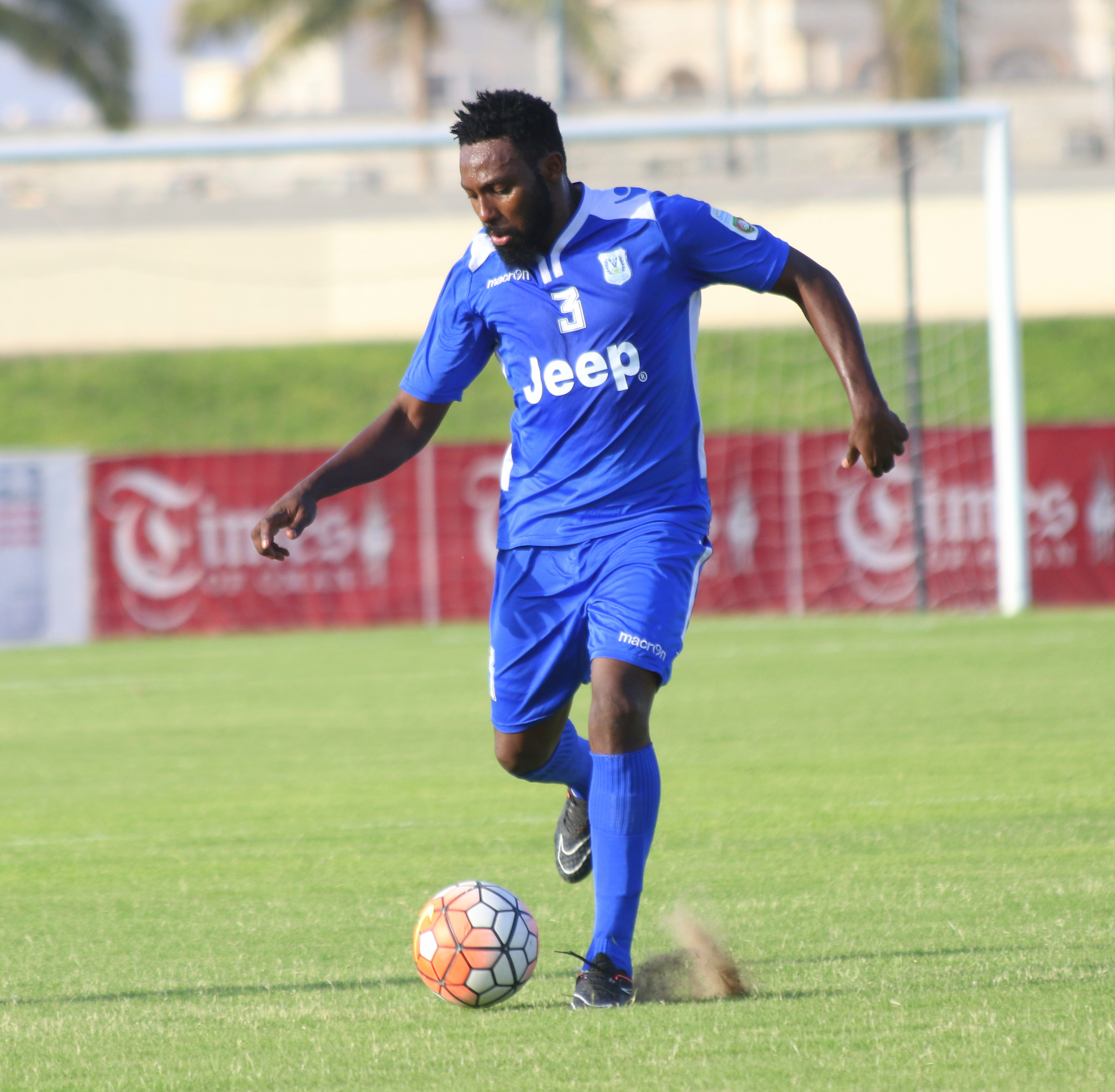
Jamal Mohamed - 2015–16 Oman Professional League Cup

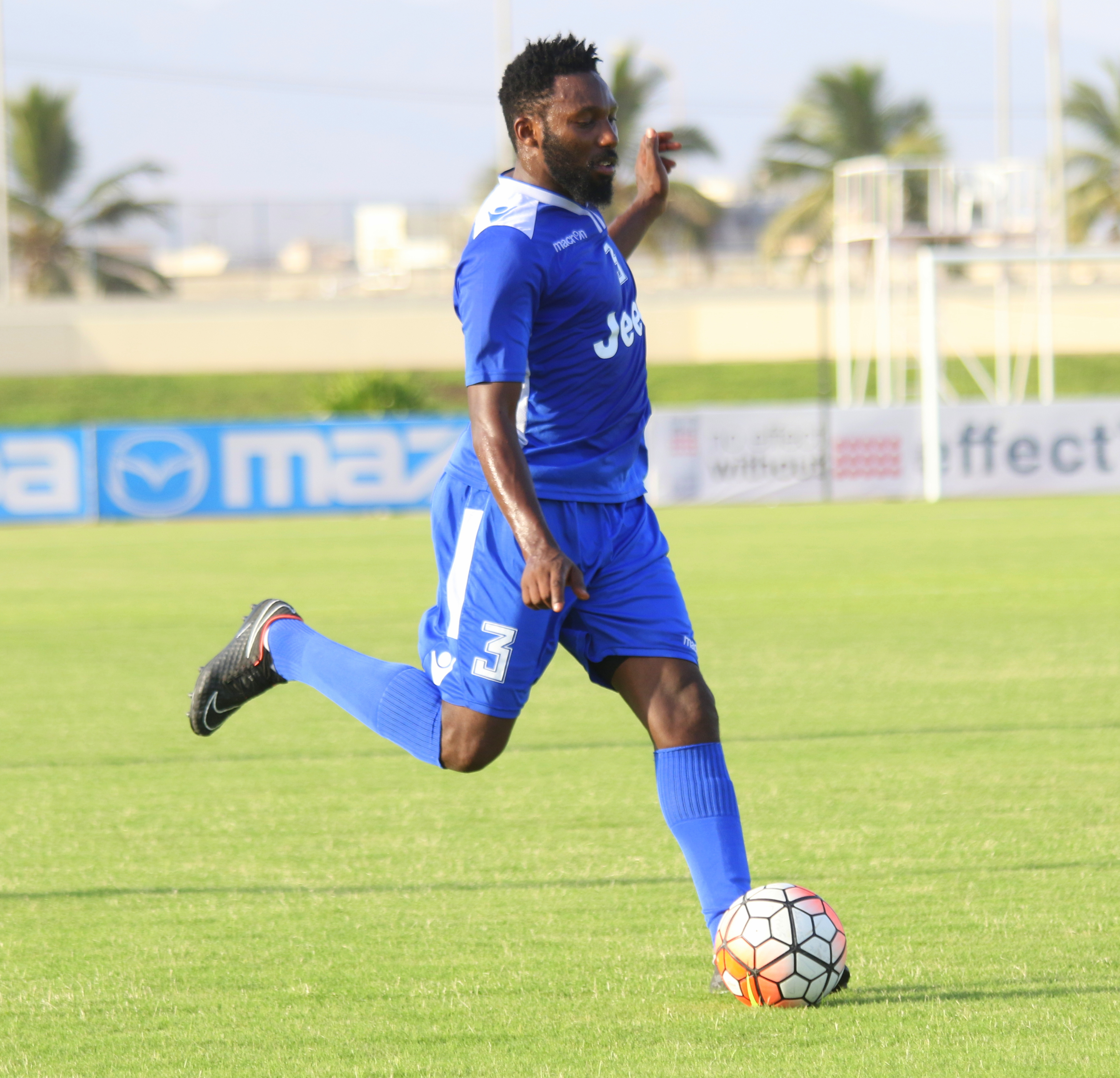
Jamal Mohamed - 2015–16 Oman Professional League Cup

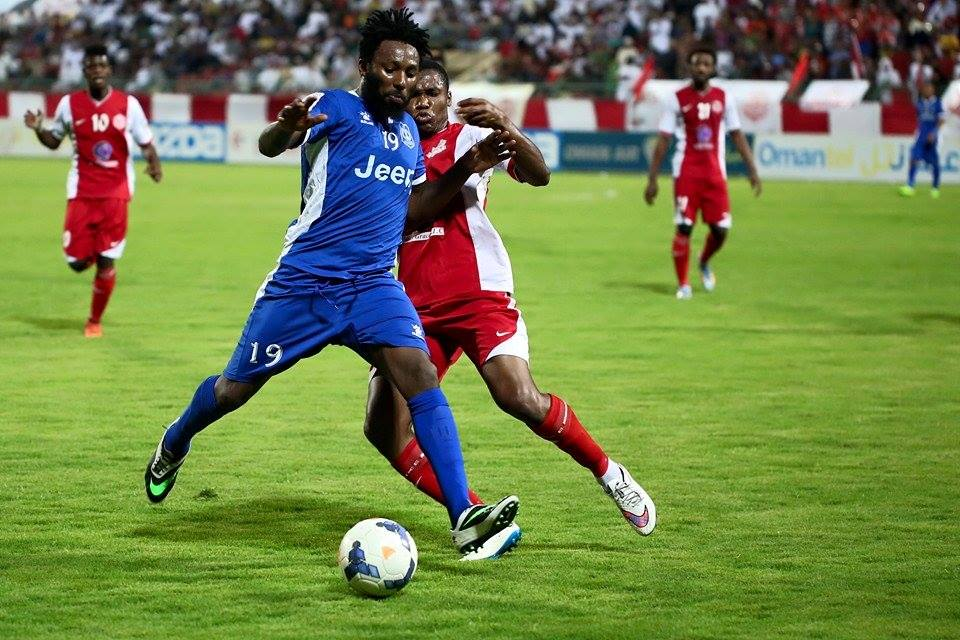
Against Dhofar S.C.S.C.

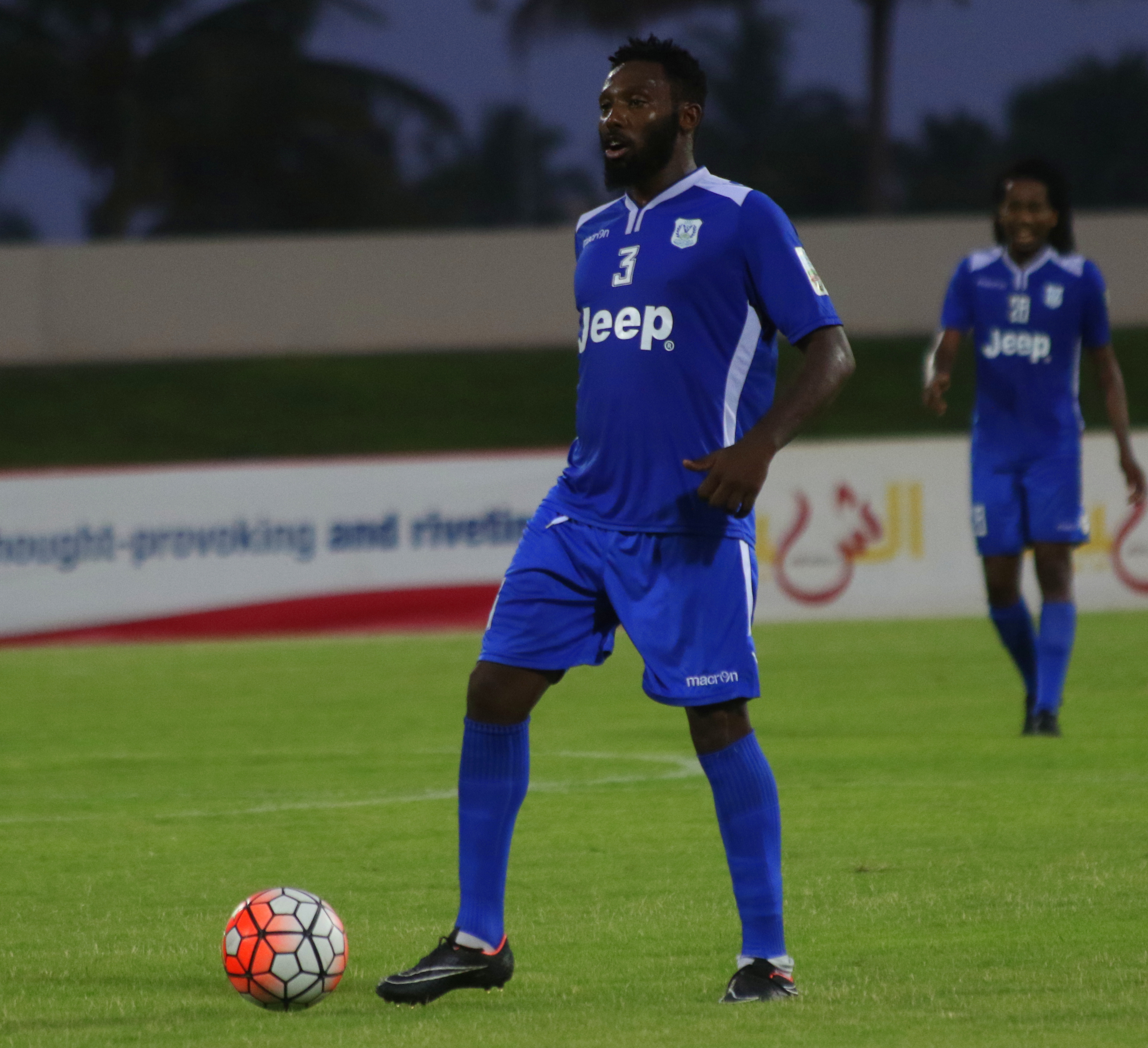
Oman Professional League Cup

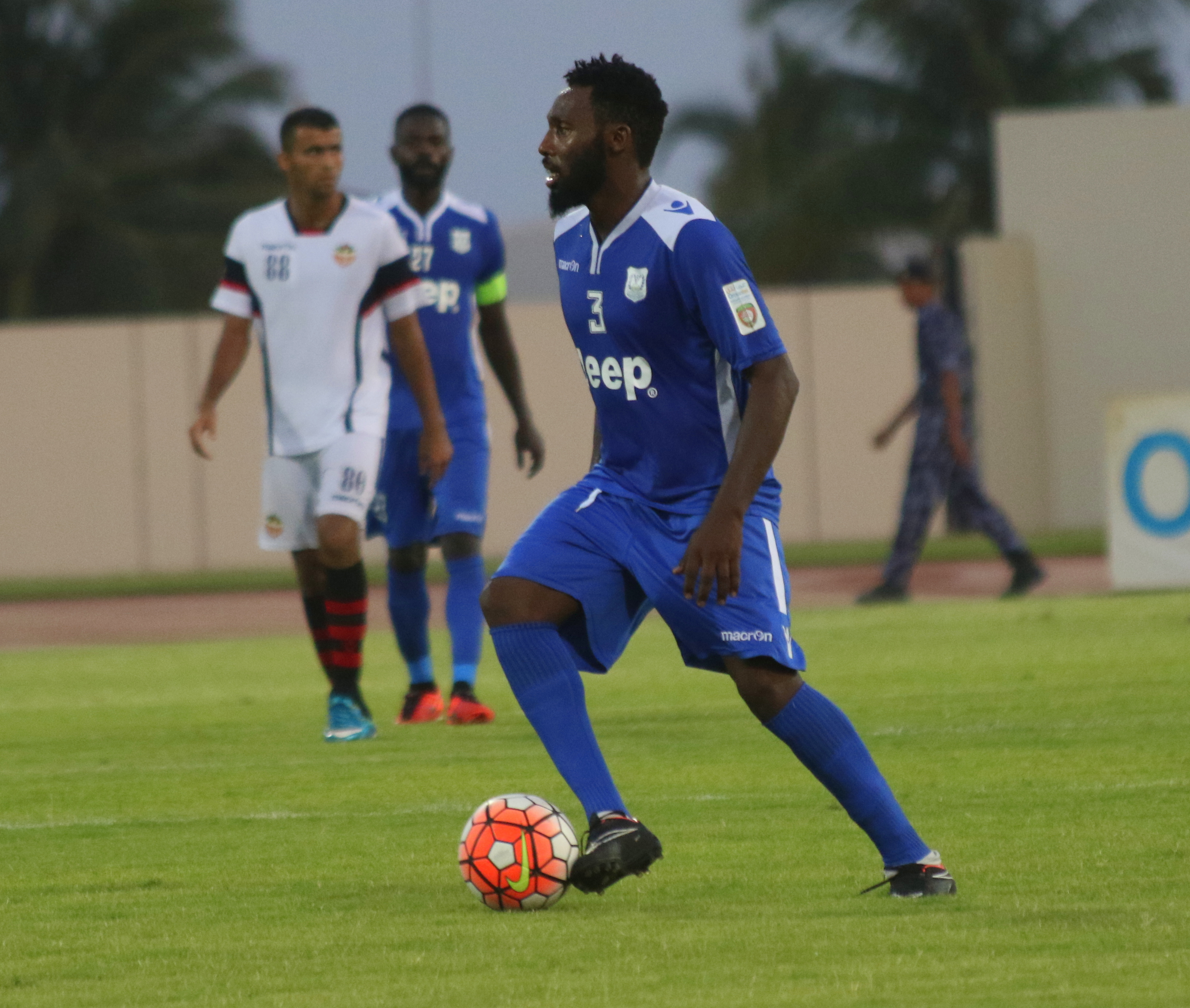
Against Al-Musannah SC

On 20 January 2015, he moved back to Oman where in Salalah he was welcomed by thousands of fans of his former club, Al-Nasr S.C.S.C. On 22 January 2015, he signed a six-month contract with his former club, Al-Nasr S.C.S.C. He made his 2014-15 Oman Professional League debut on 4 February 2015 in a 1–1 draw against Al-Khabourah SC. He made 15 appearances in the 2014–15 Oman Professional League and helped his club to secure the 4th position thus earning them a spot in the 2015–16 GCC Champions League. He also made 4 appearances in the 2014–15 Sultan Qaboos Cup and helped his club to reach the semi-finals of the competition where he side lost 2–1 on aggregate to eventual winners of the tournament and also the 2014–15 Oman Professional League, Al-Oruba SC.

On 17 August 2015, he signed a one-year contract extension with Al-Nasr S.C.C. He made his first appearance in the 2015–16 season and scored his first goal on 5 September 2015 in a 2–1 win over local rivals, Salalah SC in the 2015–16 Oman Professional League Cup. He made his first appearance in the 2015-16 Oman Professional League on 13 September 2015 in a 2–1 loss against Al-Suwaiq Club.

=== Club career statistics ===
| Club | Season | Division | League | | Cup | | Continental (Note: Includes appearances in the AFC Cup) | | Other | | Total | |
| Club | Season | Division | Apps | Goals | Apps | Goals | Apps | Goals | Apps | Goals | Apps | Goals |
|---|---|---|---|---|---|---|---|---|---|---|---|---|
| Enköping | 2007 | Superettan | 9 | 0 | 0 | 0 | 0 | 0 | 0 | 0 | 9 | 0 |
| Enköping | 2008 | Superettan | 24 | 2 | 0 | 0 | 0 | 0 | 0 | 0 | 24 | 2 |
| Enköping | Total | | 33 | 2 | 0 | 0 | 0 | 0 | 0 | 0 | 33 | 2 |
| Enköping | 2009 | Swedish Football Division 1 | 12 | 2 | 0 | 0 | 0 | 0 | 0 | 0 | 12 | 2 |
| Enköping | Total | | 12 | 2 | 0 | 0 | 0 | 0 | 0 | 0 | 12 | 2 |
| Kazma | 2009–10 | Kuwaiti Premier League | 23 | 7 | 1 | 1 | 9 | 0 | 0 | 0 | 33 | 8 |
| Kazma | 2010–11 | Kuwaiti Premier League | 21 | 2 | 2 | 1 | 0 | 0 | 0 | 0 | 23 | 3 |
| Kazma | Total | | 44 | 9 | 3 | 2 | 9 | 0 | 0 | 0 | 56 | 11 |
| Târgu Mureş | 2011–12 | Liga I | 6 | 0 | 1 | 0 | 0 | 0 | 0 | 0 | 7 | 0 |
| Târgu Mureş | Total | | 6 | 0 | 1 | 0 | 0 | 0 | 0 | 0 | 7 | 0 |
| Al-Nasr | 2012–13 | Oman Elite League | - | 1 | - | 1 | 0 | 0 | 0 | 0 | - | 2 |
| Al-Nasr | Total | | - | 1 | - | 1 | 0 | 0 | 0 | 0 | - | 2 |
| Dhofar | 2013–14 | Oman Professional League | - | 2 | - | 0 | 0 | 0 | 0 | 0 | - | 2 |
| Dhofar | Total | | - | 2 | - | 0 | 0 | 0 | 0 | 0 | - | 2 |
| Al-Nasr | 2014–15 | Oman Professional League | 15 | 0 | 4 | 0 | 0 | 0 | 0 | 0 | 19 | 0 |
| Al-Nasr | 2015–16 | Oman Professional League | 5 | 0 | 5 | 2 | 0 | 0 | 0 | 0 | 10 | 2 |
| Al-Nasr | Total | | 20 | 0 | 9 | 2 | 0 | 0 | 0 | 0 | 29 | 2 |
| Career total | | | - | 16 | - | 5 | 9 | 0 | 0 | 0 | - | 21 |

== International career ==
Jamal was selected for the Kenya national football team for the first time in 2008. He made his first appearance and scored his first goal on 6 September 2008 in a 1–0 win over Namibia in the second round of the 2010 FIFA World Cup qualification at the Moi International Sports Centre (formerly known as the Kasarani Stadium) in his hometown, Nairobi. His another goal for the national side next came in 2011 during the 2012 Africa Cup of Nations qualification in a 2–1 win over eventual Group J winners (qualified for the 2012 Africa Cup of Nations), Angola on 26 March 2011 at the Moi International Sports Centre. He has made appearances in the 2010 FIFA World Cup qualification, the 2008 CECAFA Cup, the 2012 Africa Cup of Nations qualification, the 2014 FIFA World Cup qualification, the 2011 CECAFA Cup, the 2013 Africa Cup of Nations qualification and the 2015 Africa Cup of Nations qualification.

=== International goals ===
Scores and results list Kenya's goal tally first.

| No | Date | Venue | Opponent | Score | Result | Competition |
|---|---|---|---|---|---|---|
| 1. | 6 September 2008 | Moi International Sports Centre, Nairobi, Kenya | Namibia | 1–0 | 1–0 | 2010 FIFA World Cup qualification |
| 2. | 26 March 2011 | Nyayo National Stadium, Nairobi, Kenya | Angola | 1–1 | 2–1 | 2012 Africa Cup of Nations qualification |

== Honours ==
Kazma

- Kuwait Emir Cup: 2011

Al-Nasr

- Oman Professional League Cup: 2015–16
