= Samer Fadl =

Yemeni footballer (born 1978)

Personal information
- Full name: Samer Mohammed Fadl Saleh
- Date of birth: 1991 (age 34–35)
- Place of birth: Aden Governorate, Yemen
- Position: Goalkeeper

Senior career*
| Years | Team | Apps | (Gls) |
- Al-Tilal SC
- Al-Wahda SC

Managerial career
- –2023: Al-Wahda SC
- 2023–2024: Yemen U23
- 2024–: Al-Wahda SC
- * Club domestic league appearances and goals

Samer Mohammed Fadl Saleh (Arabic: سامر فضل; born 1991) is a Yemeni football manager and former footballer who manages Al-Wahda SC.

== Playing career ==
Fadl played as a stalkeepeer and started his playing career with Yemeni side Al-Tilal SC, before signing for Omani side Al-Wahda SC. In addition, he represented Yemen internationally at youth level. Yemeni news website Yemeni Sports described him as "one of the distinguished young goalkeepers through the great levels he presented with his club Al-Tilal, which enabled him to play professionally with Al-Wahda Club in Oman, in addition to being a well-mannered and humble player".

== Managerial career ==
Fadl started his managerial career with Omani side Al-Wahda SC, helping the club achieve promotion from the second tier to the top flight. In 2023, he was appointed manager of the Yemen national under-23 football team, and helped the Yemen national under-15 football team win the 2023 WAFF U-15 Championship. Six months later, he returned as manager of Omani side Al-Wahda SC.

== Personal life ==
Fadl was born in 1991 in Aden Governorate, Yemen. A Muslim, he can speak English and Arabic.
