= Bong Bertrand =

Cameroonian footballer

Bertrand Bong Takwi
Personal information
- Full name: Bertrand Benik Tequwa Bong
- Date of birth: March 27, 1987 (age 39)
- Place of birth: Yaoundé, Cameroon
- Position: Striker

Youth career
- 2006: Canon Yaoundé
- 2007–2008: Wadi Degla

Senior career*
Years	Team	Apps	(Gls)
2009	Saham	11	(2)
2010–2012	Al-Shamal	40	(27)
2011	Ravan Baku	1	(0)
2012	Al-Ahli	0	(0)
2012–2013	Sporting CG	0	(0)
- * Club domestic league appearances and goals

Bertrand Benik Tequwa Bong (born March 27, 1987, in Yaoundé) is a Cameroonian professional footballer who last played as a striker for Sporting Clube de Goa in the I-League.

At the start of the 2012–13 I-League season, Bong signed for Sporting Clube de Goa from Al-Ahli.
