= Ousseni Zongo =

Burkinabé professional footballer (born 1984)

Personal information
- Full name: Ousseni Zongo
- Date of birth: 6 August 1984 (age 42)
- Place of birth: Ouagadougou, Burkina Faso
- Height: 1.71 m (5 ft 7 in)
- Position: Midfielder

Team information
- Current team: Muscat

Senior career*
Years	Team	Apps	(Gls)
2001–2002	Planète Champion		
2002–2003	Anderlecht	0	(0)
2003–2004	Wacker Tirol	11	(0)
2004–2005	→ SV Wörgl (loan)	19	(0)
2005–2007	Msida Saint-Joseph	36	(6)
2007–2009	União Leiria	5	(0)
2008	→ Gil Vicente (loan)	9	(0)
2009–2010	→ Arouca (loan)	11	(1)
2010–2011	→ Tondela (loan)	12	(0)
2011–2012	Valletta	28	(10)
2012–2013	Mosta	13	(2)
2013–2014	Naxxar Lions	12	(0)
2014	1º Dezembro	9	(0)
2015	Fabril	11	(0)
2015–	Muscat		

International career
2004–2009	Burkina Faso	3	(0)
- * Club domestic league appearances and goals as of 23 May 2015

Ousseni Zongo (born 6 August 1984 in Ouagadougou) is a Burkinabé professional footballer who plays for Omani club Muscat Club as a midfielder.
