= Bay Stars F.C. =

Bay Stars
- Full name: Bay Stars Football Club
- Founded: 2011
- Dissolved: 2013
- Ground: Gelvandale Stadium, Port Elizabeth
- Capacity: 3,000
- Chairman: Tony Lovegrove
- Coach: (South Africa) Urban de Kock
- League: SAFA Second Division
- 2012–13 SSD: 2nd (Eastern Cape Stream)

Bay Stars was a semi-professional South African football (soccer) club based in the city of Port Elizabeth that played in the SAFA Second Division.

The club was set up in 2011, after purchasing the SAFA Second Division franchise of Bay Academy. Bay Academy's parent club, Bay United, had been sold and moved to Polokwane, leaving Port Elizabeth without a professional football club. The club spent both years of its existence in the third tier of South African football. During the 2011–12 season, the league was known as the Vodacom League, during the 2012–13 season, it was known as the SAFA Second Division.

Following the 2012–13 season, the club's Second Division franchise was sold, and became Morning Stars. The SAFA Regional League franchise was sold later in the off season, and became Motherwell Academy.

== Ownership ==
Bay Stars was owned by local businessmen Yusuf Adams and Tony Lovegrove, in partnership with the Nelson Mandela Bay Metropolitan Municipality. In 2013, the club's SAFA second division franchise was sold to the municipality's deputy mayor, Chippa Ngcolomba, whobegan the process changing the club's name to Morning Stars.

Tony Lovegrove ran the club as its managing director, while Nelson Mandela Metropolitan University ran the club's academy team.

== Home stadium ==
The senior team played its SAFA Second Division matches at the Gelvandale Stadium. The academy team played its SAFA Regional League matches at the Missionvale Campus of Nelson Mandela Metropolitan University.

== Honours ==
- Vodacom League: 3rd (Eastern Cape stream)

2011–12

- SAFA Second Division: 2nd (Eastern Cape stream)

2012–13

- SAFA Regional League: 2nd (Nelson Mandela Bay stream)

2012–13 –

== Club records ==
=== Senior team ===
- SAFA Second Division:

2011–12 – 3rd (Eastern Cape stream)
2012–13 – 2nd (Eastern Cape stream)

- Nedbank Cup:

2012 – Vodacom League Qualification Play-offs
2013 – SAFA Second Division Qualification Play-offs

=== Academy team ===
- SAFA Regional League:

2012–13 – 2nd (Nelson Manedla Bay stream)

== Former coaches ==
- (South Africa) Graham Harrison: 2011 – 2012
- (England) Mark Harrison: 2012 – 2013
- (South Africa) Mark Tommy^{1}: 2013
- (South Africa) Urban de Kock: 2013 –
- ^1Caretaker coach

== Former captains ==
- (South Africa) Niven Kops 2011-2012, Romano Scott 2012-2013

== Player of the year ==
- (South Africa) Leroy van Rensburg 2011–12
