= Abdul Rahman Al-Ghassani =

Omani footballer (born 1990)

Personal information
- Full name: Abdul Rahman Sameer Juma Al-Ghassani
- Date of birth: 8 July 1990 (age 36)
- Place of birth: Al-Rustaq, Oman
- Height: 1.84 m (6 ft 0 in)
- Position: Striker

Team information
- Current team: Fanja
- Number: 90

Senior career*
Years	Team	Apps	(Gls)
2011–2013	Al-Rustaq	?	(?)
2013–	Fanja		

International career
2015–	Oman	1	(0)
- * Club domestic league appearances and goals

Abdul Rahman Sameer Juma Al-Ghassani (Arabic: عبدالرحمن سمير جمعة الغساني; born 8 July 1990), commonly known as Abdul Rahman Al-Ghassani, is an Omani footballer who plays for Fanja SC in Oman Professional League.
