= Vinícius Calamari =

Brazilian footballer

Personal information
- Full name: Vinícius Justino Calamari
- Date of birth: 1 June 1988 (age 38)
- Place of birth: Nova Iguaçu, Brazil
- Height: 1.78 m (5 ft 10 in)
- Position: Forward

Youth career
- –2005: Nova Iguaçu
- 2005–2007: Atlético Madrid B

Senior career*
Years	Team	Apps	(Gls)
2007–2008	Penafiel	10	(0)
2009–2010	Rio Branco	0	(0)
2011	Caxias	0	(0)
2012–2013	Bonsucesso	8	(1)
2013	Quissamã	3	(0)
2014	Prudentópolis	8	(3)
2014–2016	Cincão		
2016	Muscat		
2016	Dubai CSC		
2017	Al-Shabab		
2018	Dhofar		
2019	Prudentópolis		
2019	Salam Zgharta	2	(0)
2022–2023	Salam Zgharta	17	(2)
2023–2024	Sagesse	18	(3)
2024–2025	Jwaya	9	(5)
- * Club domestic league appearances and goals as of 8 April 2025

Vinícius Justino Calamari (born 1 June 1988) is a Brazilian professional footballer who plays as a forward.

== Career ==
Calamari signed for Penafiel on 9 August 2007. He played 10 times for the club in the Portuguese second division. At the end of the season, he was released. In January 2009 he was signed by Rio Branco of Paraná state. He was re-signed by Rio Branco for the 2010 state league.

In 2009, Brazilian Football Confederation (CBF) sued Penafiel for training compensation, as Penafiel was his first professional club. On 24 November 2010, FIFA Dispute Resolution Chamber decided that Penafiel had to pay €72,500 to CBF. In March 2011 he was signed by Caxias, but released in April.
