= Souleymane Demba =

Zambian-born Malian footballer (born 1991)

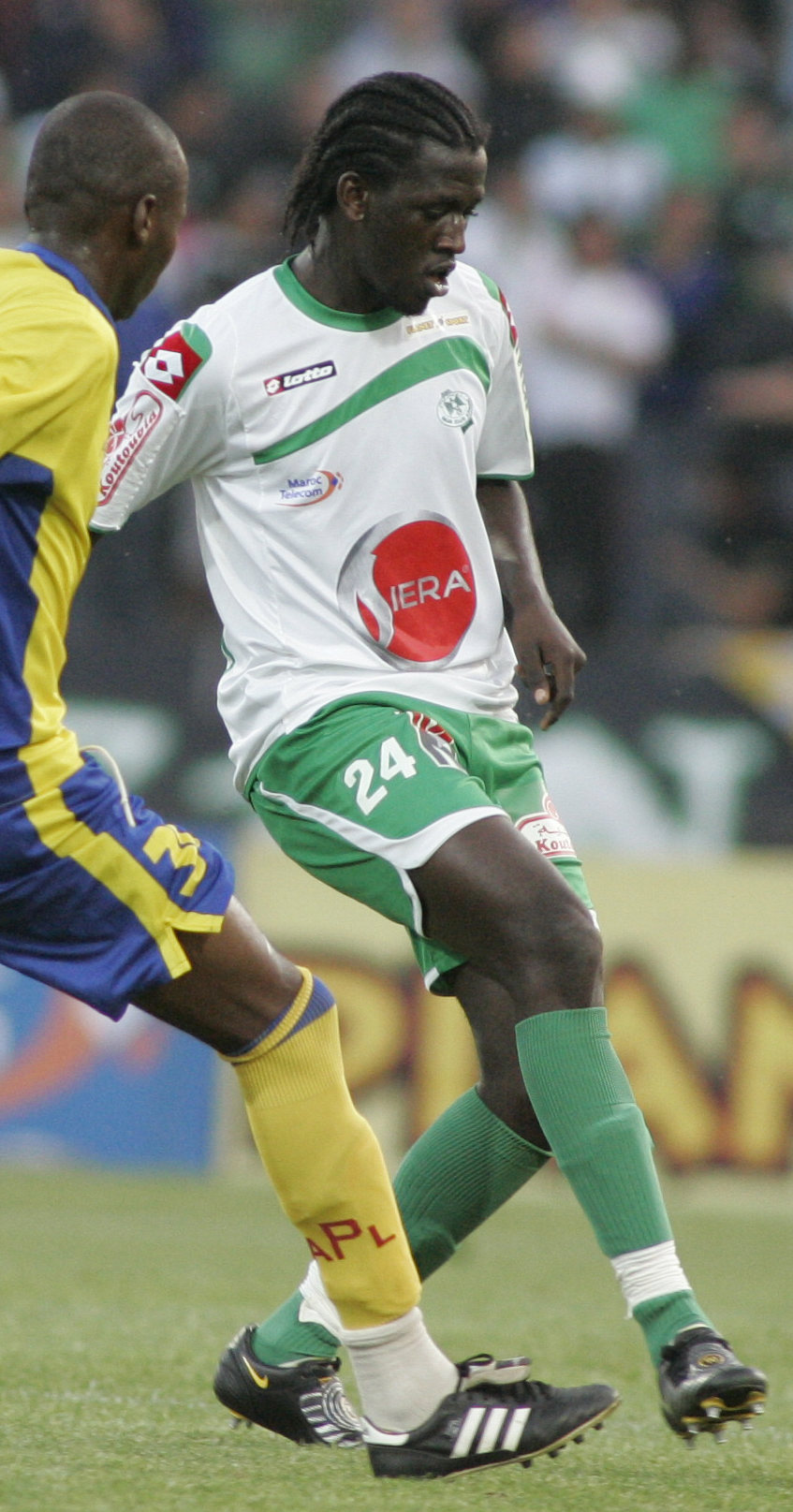

Personal information
- Full name: Souleymane Demba
- Date of birth: 17 June 1991 (age 35)
- Place of birth: Lusaka, Zambia
- Height: 1.85 m (6 ft 1 in)
- Positions: Defender; midfielder

Youth career
- 2001–2005: Nojo Sport de Bamako
- 2005–2009: Raja Casablanca

Senior career*
Years	Team	Apps	(Gls)
2009–2013	Raja Casablanca	25	(2)
2012	→ SCC Mohammédia (loan)	20	(3)
2016–2017	Al-Nahda		
2017–2019	Al-Qaisumah		
2019	Abha		
2020	Al-Kholood		

International career
2010	Mali U20	5	(0)
- * Club domestic league appearances and goals

Souleymane Demba (born 17 June 1991 in Lusaka) is a Zambian-born Malian footballer.

== Early life ==
Demba was born in Lusaka, Zambia. He is the child of Zambian mother Lafe Zimba and Malian father Moussa Demba. He started his football training in Nojo Sports Football School in Bamako before joining Raja Casablanca's formation center in Morocco at the age of 14.

== Club career ==
Demba started his professional career on 27 September 2009 when he opted for playing in the middle (or came on as a midfielder) after expulsion of Nabil Masloub against KAC Kenitra. The final result was 2–0 in favor of Raja Casablanca.

On 4 October 2009, Demba was chosen with the start team for the first time in Fez against Widad Fez. He played the entire match which ended in a draw between the two teams.

His start on the African Champions League was on 14 February 2010 when he substituted his teammate, Baqlal, during the second half of the match against Fello Star in Guinean capital Conakry.

== Career statistics ==
As of 9 May 2010

Club	Season	League		Cup		Africa		Total	
Club	Season	Apps	Goals	Apps	Goals	Apps	Goals	Apps	Goals
Raja Casablanca	2009–10	5	0	0	0	4	0	9	0
Raja Casablanca	Total	5	0	0	0	4	0	9	0
Career Total		5	0	0	0	4	0	9	0
