= Waleed Al-Saadi =

Omani footballer (born 1995)

Personal information
- Full name: Waleed Abdullah Ameir Al-Saadi
- Date of birth: 19 February 1995 (age 31)
- Place of birth: Muscat, Oman
- Height: 1.73 m (5 ft 8 in)
- Position: Forward

Team information
- Current team: Al-Suwaiq
- Number: 50

Youth career
- 2005–2009: Al-Suwaiq

Senior career*
Years	Team	Apps	(Gls)
2009–2013	Al-Suwaiq	?	(20)
2013–2015	Al-Musannah	?	(7)
2015–	Al-Suwaiq		

International career
2010	Oman U-23	4	(2)
2012–	Oman	6	(0)
- * Club domestic league appearances and goals

Waleed Abdullah Ameir Al-Saadi (Arabic: وليد عبدالله عمير السعدي; born 19 February 1995), commonly known as Waleed Al-Saadi, is an Omani footballer who the current assistant coach for Oman.

== Club career ==
On 10 June 2014, he signed a one-year contract extension with Al-Musannah SC.

=== Club career statistics ===
Club	Season	Division	League		Cup		Continental (Note: Includes appearances in the AFC Cup)		Other		Total	
Club	Season	Division	Apps	Goals	Apps	Goals	Apps	Goals	Apps	Goals	Apps	Goals
Al-Suwaiq	2011–12	Oman Elite League	-	14	-	0	6	2	-	0	-	14
Al-Suwaiq	2012–13	Oman Elite League	-	6	-	3	0	0	-	0	-	11
Al-Suwaiq	Total		-	20	-	3	6	2	-	0	-	25
Al-Musannah	2013–14	Oman Professional League	-	7	-	0	0	0	-	0	-	7
Al-Musannah	Total		-	7	-	0	0	0	-	0	-	7
Career total			-	27	-	3	6	2	-	0	-	32

== International career ==
Waleed is part of the first team squad of the Oman national football team. He was selected for the national team for the first time in 2012. He made his first appearance for Oman on 8 November 2012 in a friendly match against Estonia. He has made appearances in the 2012 WAFF Championship and the 2014 FIFA World Cup qualification.

== Honours ==
=== Club ===
- Omani League (1): 2012–13
- Omani Super Cup (1): 2013; Runners-Up 2011
- Sultan Qaboos Cup (1): 2012–13

=== Individual ===
- Omani League : Top Scorer-2011-12
