= Al-Wahda SC (Oman) =

Omani sports club

Al-Wahda SC نادي الوحدة الرياضي
- Full name: Al-Wahda Sports Club
- Founded: 1970; 56 years ago
- Ground: Sur Sports Complex; Sur, Oman
- Capacity: 8,000
- Manager: Samer Fadl
- League: Oman Professional League
- 2023–24: 12nd of 12
Home colours	Away colours	Third colours

Al-Wahda Sports Club (Arabic: نادي الوحدة الرياضي) is an Omani sports club based in Sur, Oman. The club currently plays in the First Division League of Oman Football Association. Their home ground is Sur Sports Complex. The stadium is government owned, but they also have their own stadium and sports equipment, as well as their own training facilities.

== Being a multisport club ==
Although being mainly known for their football, Al-Wahda SC like many other clubs in Oman, have not only football in their list, but also hockey, volleyball, handball, basketball, badminton and squash. They also have a youth football team competing in the Omani Youth league.

== Players ==
=== First-team squad ===
Note: Flags indicate national team as defined under FIFA eligibility rules; some limited exceptions apply. Players may hold more than one non-FIFA nationality.

No.	Pos.	Nation	Player
1	GK	OMA	Ibrahim Al-Rajhi
2	DF	OMA	Khalid Al-Alawi
3	DF	CGO	Varel Rozan
4	MF	OMA	Al-Muhannad Al-Habsi
7	MF	OMA	Mohammed Al-Alawi
8	MF	OMA	Mazen Al-Rootli
9	FW	YEM	Ahmed Maher
11	FW	OMA	Mishal Al-Majizi
13	DF	OMA	Abdullah Al-Mukhaini
14	MF	OMA	Dhiyab Al-Shuhimi
16	FW	OMA	Waled Al-Saadi
17	MF	MLI	Mamadou Kouyate
18	MF	OMA	Abdul Rahman Juma
21	DF	OMA	Bashar Al-Mukhaini
23	DF	OMA	Mubarak Al-Ghailani
25	DF	OMA	Sloum Al-Maskri
26	MF	OMA	Mashal Juma

No.	Pos.	Nation	Player
27	MF	OMA	Hamed Al-Mukhaini
28	DF	OMA	Abdul Majed Al-Yahmadi
31	DF	OMA	Qais Al-Balushi
34	DF	OMA	Mohsen Al-Daoudi
66	GK	OMA	Omer Al-Abri
77	MF	OMA	Mazen Al-Saadi
78	MF	OMA	Ahmed Jamil
80	MF	OMA	Hisham Al-Shuaibi
88	MF	RWA	Ally Niyonzima
90	FW	OMA	Younes Al-Sunaidi
92	GK	OMA	Juma Said
97	DF	OMA	Tariq Al-Mashary
99	FW	OMA	Yousef Khalfan Al-Saadi
—	DF	OMA	Abdullah Al-Mashaikhi
—	DF	OMA	Saad Al-Saeedi
—	FW	OMA	Mohammed Al-Maqhoushi
—	DF	OMA	Samir Al-Alawi
