= Al-Wusta Club =

- Founded: 2013

Al-Wusta Club is a football club based in Oman.

The club serves for the four Wilayats of the Al Wusta Governorate region; Haima, Duqm, Mahout and Al Jazer.

The club plays in the Oman First Division League.
