= Mohammed Taqi Al-Lawati =

Omani footballer (born 1985)

Mohammed Taqi
Personal information
- Full name: Mohammed Ahmed Taqi Al-Lawati
- Date of birth: 12 September 1985 (age 41)
- Place of birth: Muscat, Oman
- Height: 1.73 m (5 ft 8 in)
- Position: Striker

Team information
- Current team: Al-Wusta

Senior career*
| Years | Team | Apps | (Gls) |
| 2004–2009 | Muscat | | (8) |
| 2005 | → Al-Yarmouk (loan) | | (1) |
| 2009–2010 | Dhofar | | (3) |
| 2010–2012 | Al-Yarmouk | | (5) |
| 2012–2013 | Muscat | | |
| 2013 | Al-Nahda | | (1) |
| 2013–2014 | Al-Shabab | | (5) |
| 2014–2015 | Bosher | | (6) |
| 2015–2017 | Al-Orouba | | (18) |
| 2017–2018 | Fanja | | (8) |
| 2018–2019 | Al-Shabab | | |
| 2019– | Al-Wusta | | |

International career
| 2005–2008 | Oman | 5 | (1) |
- * Club domestic league appearances and goals as of 19:51, 6 June 2022 (UTC)

Mohammed Ahmed Taqi Al-Lawati (Arabic: محمد أحمد تقي اللواتي; born 12 September 1985), commonly known as Mohammed Taqi, is an Omani footballer who plays as a striker for Oman Professional League club Al-Wusta.

== Club career ==
On 1 August 2013, he signed a one-year contract with Al-Shabab. On 14 August 2014, he signed a one-year contract with Bosher. He made his debut and scored his first goal for Bosher on 11 September 2014, in a 2–2 draw against his former club Al-Shabab.

== International career ==
Mohammed was selected for the national team for the first time in 2005. He has made one appearance in the 2010 FIFA World Cup qualification.

== Career statistics ==
=== Club ===
| Club | Season | Division | League | | Cup | | Continental (Note: Includes goal in the AFC Cup) | | Other | | Total | |
| Club | Season | Division | Apps | Goals | Apps | Goals | Apps | Goals | Apps | Goals | Apps | Goals |
|---|---|---|---|---|---|---|---|---|---|---|---|---|
| Muscat | 2006–07 | Omani League | - | 2 | - | 0 | - | 1 | - | 0 | - | 3 |
| Muscat | 2007–08 | Omani League | - | 4 | - | 3 | 0 | 0 | - | 0 | - | 7 |
| Muscat | 2008–09 | Omani League | - | 2 | - | 0 | 0 | 0 | - | 0 | - | 2 |
| Muscat | Total | | - | 8 | - | 3 | - | 1 | - | 0 | - | 12 |
| Dhofar | 2009–10 | Omani League | - | 3 | - | 2 | 0 | 0 | - | 0 | - | 5 |
| Dhofar | Total | | - | 3 | - | 2 | - | 0 | - | 0 | - | 5 |
| Al-Yarmouk | 2010–11 | Kuwaiti Premier League | - | 5 | - | 0 | 0 | 0 | - | 0 | - | 5 |
| Al-Yarmouk | Total | | - | 5 | - | 0 | 0 | 0 | - | 0 | - | 5 |
| Al-Nahda | 2012–13 | Oman Elite League | - | 1 | - | 0 | 0 | 0 | - | 0 | - | 1 |
| Al-Nahda | Total | | - | 1 | - | 0 | 0 | 0 | - | 0 | - | 1 |
| Al-Shabab | 2013–14 | Oman Professional League | - | 5 | - | 0 | 0 | 0 | - | 0 | - | 5 |
| Al-Shabab | Total | | - | 5 | - | 0 | 0 | 0 | - | 0 | - | 5 |
| Bowsher | 2014–15 | Oman Professional League | - | 1 | 0 | 0 | 0 | 0 | - | 0 | - | 1 |
| Bowsher | Total | | - | 1 | - | 0 | 0 | 0 | - | 0 | - | 1 |
| Career total | | | - | 23 | - | 5 | - | 1 | - | 0 | - | 29 |
