= Al-Salam SC (Oman) =

Omani sports club

Al-Salam SC نادي السلام الرياضي
- Full name: Al-Salam Sports Club
- Founded: 2002
- Ground: Sohar Regional Sports Complex; Sohar, Oman
- Capacity: 19,000
- League: First division
- 2024–25: TBA
Home colours	Away colours	Third colours

Al-Salam Sports Club (Arabic: نادي السلام الرياضي) is an Omani sports club based in Sohar, Oman. The club currently plays in the Oman Second Division League, second division of Oman Football Association.

== Being a multisport club ==
Although mainly known for their football, Al-Salam SC like many other clubs in Oman, have not only football in their list, but also hockey, volleyball, handball, basketball, badminton and squash. They also have a youth football team competing in the Omani Youth league.
