= 2015 AFC Asian Cup Group C =

Football tournament group stage

Group C of the 2015 AFC Asian Cup was one of four groups of nations competing at the 2015 AFC Asian Cup. The group's first round of matches were played on 11 January, the second round on 15 January, and the final round on 19 January. All six group matches were played at venues in Australia. The group consisted of Iran, United Arab Emirates, Qatar, and Bahrain. Iran and United Arab Emirates advanced as group winners and runners-up respectively, while Bahrain and Qatar were eliminated.

== Teams ==
| Draw position | Team | Method of qualification | Date of qualification | Finals appearance | Last appearance | Previous best performance | FIFA Rankings | |
| Draw position | Team | Method of qualification | Date of qualification | Finals appearance | Last appearance | Previous best performance | March 2014 (Note: The rankings of March 2014 were used for seeding for the final draw.) | Start of event |
|---|---|---|---|---|---|---|---|---|
| C1 | Iran | Group B winners | 19 November 2013 | 13th | 2011 | Winners (1968, 1972, 1976) | 42 | 51 |
| C2 | United Arab Emirates | Group E winners | 15 November 2013 | 9th | 2011 | Runners-up (1996) | 61 | 80 |
| C3 | Qatar | Group D runners-up | 19 November 2013 | 9th | 2011 | Quarter-finals (2000, 2011) | 101 | 92 |
| C4 | Bahrain | Group D winners | 15 November 2013 | 5th | 2011 | Fourth place (2004) | 106 | 110 |

== Standings ==
| Pos | Team | Pld | W | D | L | GF | GA | GD | Pts | Qualification |
|---|---|---|---|---|---|---|---|---|---|---|
| 1 | Iran | 3 | 3 | 0 | 0 | 4 | 0 | +4 | 9 | Advance to knockout stage |
| 2 | United Arab Emirates | 3 | 2 | 0 | 1 | 6 | 3 | +3 | 6 | Advance to knockout stage |
| 3 | Bahrain | 3 | 1 | 0 | 2 | 3 | 5 | −2 | 3 | |
| 4 | Qatar | 3 | 0 | 0 | 3 | 2 | 7 | −5 | 0 | |

Source: Asian Cup Australia 2015
Rules for classification: Tiebreakers

In the quarter-finals:

- Iran advanced to play Iraq (runner-up of Group D).
- United Arab Emirates advanced to play Japan (winner of Group D).

== Matches ==
=== United Arab Emirates vs Qatar ===
A brace each from forwards Ahmed Khalil and Ali Mabkhout gave the United Arab Emirates a comprehensive 4–1 win over Arabian Gulf Cup champions Qatar in their opener at Canberra Stadium. Two-time quarter-finalists and Qatar took the lead courtesy of Khalfan Ibrahim's 22nd minute chipped effort, but the scores were leveled at 36 minutes by former Asian Young Footballer of the Year Khalil from close range.

Set-pieces in the second half were to prove Qatar's undoing as first Khalil at 51 minutes and then Mabkhout at 56 minutes profited from dead-ball situations, before Mabkhout got his second in the dying minutes of the game to help the UAE into the all-important knockout stage qualification spots in the opening round of Group C games. An even opening spell in Australia's capital saw two teams intent on attack, and inside the first 10 minutes there was goalmouth action at either end of the field as Khalil and Mabkhout both saw efforts ruffle the side-netting, while Qatari defender Abdulaziz Hatem had a dangerous cross turned away at the back post by Mohamed Abdulrahman.

With such an open game in the making, it was no surprise that the first goal came not long after as Majed Naser could only push out Mohammed Muntari’s close range effort as far as Ibrahim who controlled the ball on his chest before delicately sending a flying volley over the stranded goalkeeper on the line. Khalil came close to drawing the UAE back within three minutes, though, as his downward header demanded a sprawling save from Qasem Burhan in the Qatar goal, flicking the ball around his own post. At the other end, Abdelkarim Hassan almost extended the lead with a driving shot from distance into the side-netting, but with nine minutes of the half remaining the Emirates had drawn level. Burhan came and failed to collect, and Abdelaziz Sanqour whipped the ball across goal where Khalil’s header was blocked back to him by Ibrahim Majed on the line and rebounded in off the Emirati forward's chest. Qatar coach Djamel Belmadi brought on 2014 WAFF Championship top scorer Boualem Khoukhi after the break to add some cutting edge to his attack, but just six minutes after the restart it was the UAE who went ahead for the first time in the match. The goal came from the boot of Khalil, who had threatened for much of the first period, taking full advantage from a dangerous set-piece on the corner of the penalty area to loop his free kick into the far corner of the goal. And just five minutes later the UAE profited again from a dead-ball situation. This time Khamis Esmaeel’s on-target free kick was fumbled by Burhan and Mabkhout was first on the scene to follow up and drill the ball home.

Forwards Ismail Mohamad and Meshal Adulla entered the fray after the hour mark to try and reduce the deficit for Qatar, and the former went closest, forcing Naser into a flying block at his near post. The Emirati custodian almost inadvertently gave Qatar a way back in with five minutes remaining as he turned Hassan’s near post shot onto his own upright but Mabkhout then put the game beyond doubt at the 90th minute as he combined with Omar Abdulrahman to rifle home from six yards.

11 January 2015
18:00 AEDT (UTC+11)

| United Arab Emirates | 4–1 | Qatar |
|---|---|---|
| Khalil 37', 52'; Mabkhout 56', 90' | Report | Ibrahim 23' |

Canberra Stadium, Canberra
Attendance: 5,513
Referee: Kim Jong-hyeok (South Korea)

| United Arab Emirates | Qatar |

| GK | 1 | Majed Naser (c) |
| RB | 14 | Abdelaziz Sanqour |
| CB | 8 | Hamdan Al-Kamali | (yellow card) 61' |
| CB | 6 | Mohanad Salem |
| LB | 3 | Walid Abbas | (yellow card) 35' |
| DM | 16 | Mohamed Abdulrahman | | (substituted off) 68' |
| RM | 13 | Khamis Esmaeel |
| LM | 5 | Amer Abdulrahman | | (substituted off) 68' |
| AM | 10 | Omar Abdulrahman |
| CF | 7 | Ali Mabkhout |
| CF | 11 | Ahmed Khalil | | (substituted off) 85' |
Substitutions:
| MF | 15 | Ismail Al Hammadi | | (substituted on) 68' |
| MF | 17 | Majed Hassan | | (substituted on) 68' |
| MF | 4 | Habib Fardan | | (substituted on) 85' |
Manager:
Mahdi Ali

| GK | 1 | Qasem Burhan |
| RB | 18 | Mohammed Tresor Abdullah |
| CB | 4 | Almahdi Ali Mukhtar |
| CB | 13 | Ibrahim Majid (c) |
| LB | 3 | Abdelkarim Hassan |
| DM | 20 | Karim Boudiaf | | (substituted off) 46' |
| DM | 23 | Ahmed Abdul Maqsoud | (yellow card) 44' |
| CM | 5 | Abdulaziz Hatem |
| RF | 11 | Hassan Al-Haydos |
| CF | 19 | Mohammed Muntari | | (substituted off) 69' |
| LF | 10 | Khalfan Ibrahim | | (substituted off) 63' |
Substitutions:
| DF | 16 | Boualem Khoukhi | | (substituted on) 46' |
| FW | 17 | Ismaeel Mohammad | | (substituted on) 63' |
| FW | 9 | Meshal Abdullah | | (substituted on) 69' |
Manager:
(Algeria) Djamel Belmadi

Man of the Match:

- Ahmed Khalil (United Arab Emirates)

Assistant referees:

- Jeong Hae-sang (South Korea)
- Yoon Kwang-yeol (South Korea)

Fourth official:

- Yudai Yamamoto (Japan)

Fifth official:

- Najah Raham Rashid (Iraq)

=== Iran vs Bahrain ===
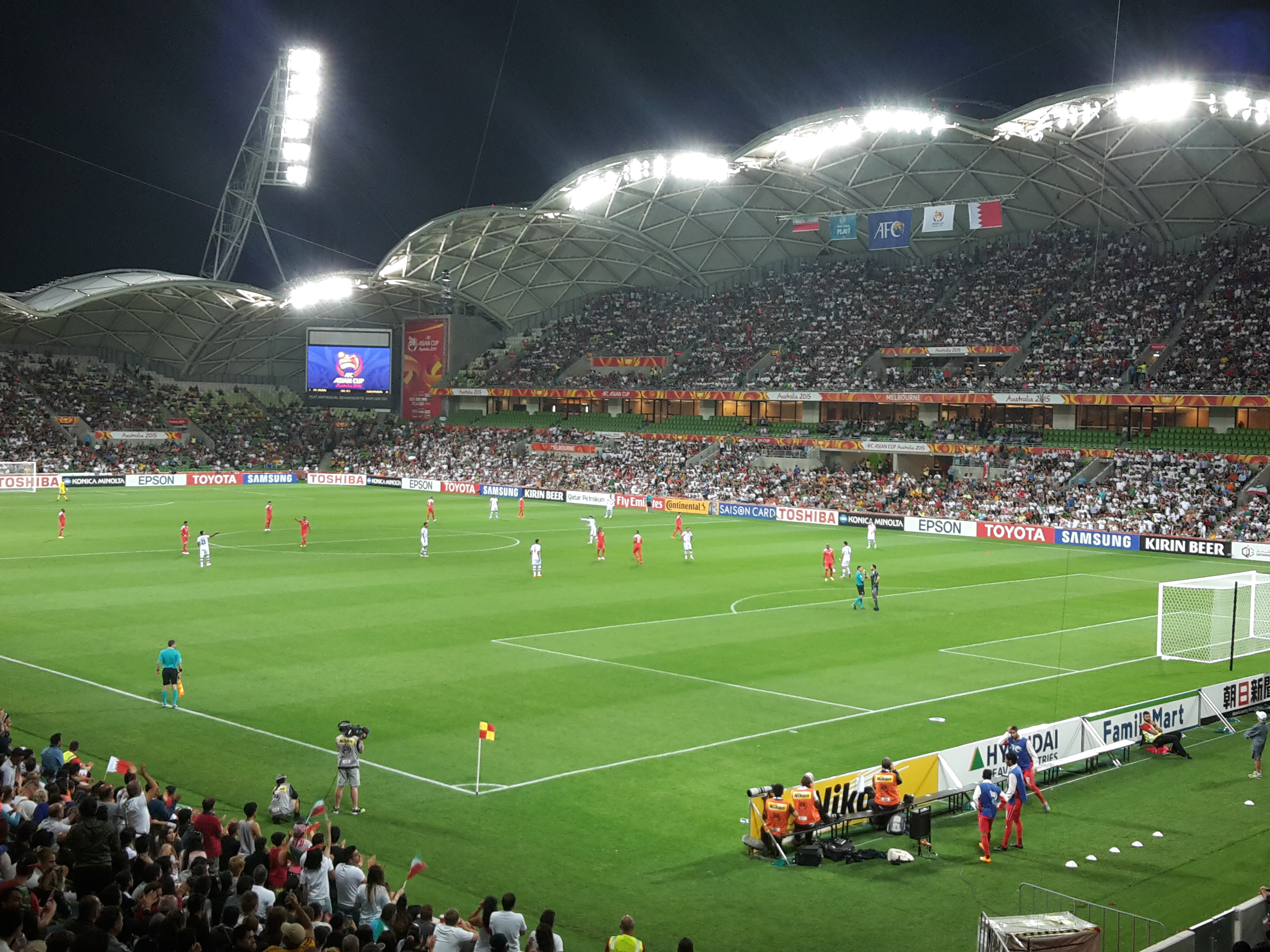
Iran v Bahrain

Ehsan Hajsafi and Masoud Shojaei scored either side of half-time for Iran, who were roared on by the vast majority of the 17,712 strong crowd in Melbourne. Hajsafi opened the scoring in first-half stoppage time when his volley looped under the bar after Bahrain had partially cleared a corner, while Shojaei doubled Iran's lead in the 71st minute from another set piece. Iran showed plenty of power down the flanks, guile in midfield and defensive solidity and, barring a number of dubious offside calls, could have won by more than two goals. Iran supporters had been raucously cheering their team for at least half an hour before the game began but it was Bahrain who made the brighter start.

Jaycee John Okwunwanne struck an audacious volley just wide, while Sayed Saeed should have done better with his free header in the 16th minute, following Sami Al-Husaini's clever chip over Iran's defence. But, after Bahrain's early flurry, Iran began to create some opportunities of their own, with Ashkan Dejagah failing to convert a one-on-one chance in the 20th minute. Two minutes later Reza Ghoochannejhad dinked the ball to a marginally offside Hajsafi, who picked out the top corner and was consequently booked, while Morteza Pouraliganji volleyed over the bar from a free-kick. Iran also had the ball in the net at the half-hour mark but were again denied by the offside flag and, after dominating the rest of the first period, Carlos Queiroz's side deservedly hit the front just before the break when Hajsafi volleyed home. The Persians could have doubled their lead immediately after the restart with Reza Ghoochannejhad bursting onto Hajsafi's pass before firing wide. The miss was moot, however, as the Charlton Athletic striker would have been denied a goal due to an incorrectly raised offside flag. But apart from Ghoochannejhad's chance, the opening 15 minutes of the second half were rather tame, before John did well to bring down a long ball and then cracked a shot on target that Iran goalkeeper Alireza Haghighi could only parry. Another poor offside call thwarted Iran in the 63rd minute as Ghoochannejhad tapped in from Shojaei's cut-back. But, there was no problem eight minutes later when Shojaei volleyed Andranik Teymourian's corner inside the far post to cap off a fine performance by Iran.

11 January 2015
20:00 AEDT (UTC+11)

| Iran | 2–0 | Bahrain |
|---|---|---|
| Hajsafi 45+1'; Shojaei 71' | Report |

Melbourne Rectangular Stadium, Melbourne
Attendance: 17,712
Referee: Ben Williams (Australia)

| Iran | Bahrain |

| GK | 1 | Alireza Haghighi |
| RB | 11 | Vouria Ghafouri |
| CB | 4 | Jalal Hosseini |
| CB | 8 | Morteza Pouraliganji |
| LB | 23 | Mehrdad Pooladi |
| CM | 14 | Andranik Teymourian |
| CM | 6 | Javad Nekounam (c) |
| RW | 21 | Ashkan Dejagah | | (substituted off) 89' |
| AM | 7 | Masoud Shojaei | | (substituted off) 80' |
| LW | 3 | Ehsan Hajsafi | (yellow card) 23' |
| CF | 16 | Reza Ghoochannejhad | | (substituted off) 75' |
Substitutions:
| FW | 20 | Sardar Azmoun | | (substituted on) 75' |
| FW | 18 | Alireza Jahanbakhsh | | (substituted on) 80' |
| FW | 17 | Soroush Rafiei | | (substituted on) 89' |
Manager:
(Portugal) Carlos Queiroz

| GK | 1 | Sayed Jaffer |
| RB | 15 | Abdullah Omar | (yellow card) 44' |
| CB | 17 | Hussain Ali Baba |
| CB | 2 | Mohamed Husain (c) |
| LB | 3 | Waleed Al-Hayam | | (substituted off) 65' |
| RM | 20 | Sami Al-Husaini | | (substituted off) 80' |
| CM | 12 | Faouzi Aaish |
| CM | 7 | Abdulwahab Al-Safi |
| LM | 4 | Sayed Saeed |
| CF | 14 | Jaycee John Okwunwanne |
| CF | 11 | Ismail Abdullatif | | (substituted off) 66' |
Substitutions:
| DF | 23 | Rashed Al-Hooti | | (substituted on) 65' |
| MF | 9 | Abdulwahab Al-Malood | | (substituted on) 66' |
| MF | 8 | Sayed Ahmed | | (substituted on) 80' |
Manager:
Marjan Eid

Man of the Match:

- Ehsan Hajsafi (Iran)

Assistant referees:

- Matthew Cream (Australia)
- Paul Cetrangolo (Australia)

Fourth official:

- Christopher Beath (Australia)

Fifth official:

- Akane Yagi (Japan)

=== Bahrain vs United Arab Emirates ===
The fastest goal ever scored in AFC Asian Cup history from the boot of Ali Mabkhout and a second-half own goal by Mohamed Husain were enough to give the United Arab Emirates a 2–1 victory over Bahrain. Striker Mabkhout's historic opener came within just 14 seconds of kick-off in the Group C match played at a sun-drenched Canberra Stadium. However, Nigeria-born striker Jaycee John Okwunwanne brought Bahrain back into a tie with a header before the half hour mark.

The match continued in end-to-end fashion and it took an unfortunate own goal from Bahrain captain Hussain at the 74th minute to separate the sides as the island nation were eliminated from the tournament, following their defeat on Sunday to Iran. After a convincing 4–1 victory over Arabian Gulf Cup champions Qatar at Canberra Stadium on 11 January, UAE coach Mahdi Ali made just one change to his starting 11 with Mohamed Ahmad replacing Mohanad Salem in defense. Bahrain coach Marjan Eid, meanwhile, brought in four new faces as he looked for a positive result to ensure his side's tournament would continue to the final group game. But Eid could have hardly prepared for what happened in the opening seconds of the game. Shortly after the kickoff, Bahrain defender Abdullah Omar lost the ball to Omar Abdulrahman in the right-back position and the playmaker's immediate lofted pass found Mabkhout running through on goal to slip the ball under goalkeeper Sayyid Muhammad Ja'far for an extraordinary start to the contest. Despite the stunning setback, Bahrain looked to respond and Abdulwahab Al Malood and Jaycee John both had volleyed efforts at Majed Naser's goal that flew wide. Mohamed Abdulrahman could have then helped the UAE go two goals to the good after he did well to retain possession inside the penalty area and play in Ahmed Khalil, but the striker could only fire his shot onto the foot of Jaffer's near post.

UAE's failure to convert was punished at 25 minutes as Jaycee John rose highest at the backpost to power home Faouzi Aaish's inswinging corner with a thumping header. Three minutes later the powerful forward almost replicated his efforts and he headed a left-wing cross from Rashed Al-Hooti that Naser did well to save. As the first period continued in frenetic fashion, Omar Abdulrahman then danced past two defenders before playing in Mabkhout who tricked his way past Jaffer only to see the ball cleared off the line. The second period didn't begin as dramatically as the first, but Al Malood did have a chance on goal 10 minutes after the interval as Jaycee John's header back to him found him with space for a shot inside the penalty area, but the forward could only steer his shot narrowly wide. A Bahraini backpass before the hour mark was punished with a free kick a yard inside the penalty area, and from the dead-ball Omar Abdulrahman clipped the top of the crossbar with a sweetly struck shot. But at 73 minutes, again from a set piece, the UAE took the lead. An inswinging free kick from the left side by Amer Abdulrahman curled dangerously into the penalty area and was met by the head of Bahrain skipper Hussain and inadvertently flew into his own net. Bahrain almost restored parity through a free kick of their own through Aaish, but Naser was able to tip over the inswinging free kick from the right as Bahrain cranked up the pressure with forwards Abdulatif and Sami Al-Husaini entering the fray. But, the UAE were able to contain the Bahraini onslaught and saw out the tie and take all three points to win their second consecutive game at the continental championship.

15 January 2015
18:00 AEDT (UTC+11)

| Bahrain | 1–2 | United Arab Emirates |
|---|---|---|
| Okwunwanne 26' | Report | Mabkhout 1'; Husain 74' (o.g.) |

Canberra Stadium, Canberra
Attendance: 7,925
Referee: Chris Beath (Australia)

| Bahrain | United Arab Emirates |

| GK | 1 | Sayed Jaffer |
| RB | 15 | Abdullah Omar |
| CB | 18 | Mohamed Duaij Mahorfi | | (substituted off) 66' |
| CB | 2 | Mohamed Husain (c) | (yellow card) 12' |
| LB | 23 | Rashed Al-Hooti | (yellow card) 89' |
| CM | 4 | Sayed Saeed | | (substituted off) 78' |
| CM | 8 | Sayed Ahmed |
| CM | 7 | Abdulwahab Al-Safi | (yellow card) 50' |
| AM | 9 | Abdulwahab Al Malood | | (substituted off) 78' |
| AM | 12 | Faouzi Aaish | (yellow card) 90+4' |
| CF | 14 | Jaycee John Okwunwanne |
Substitutions:
| DF | 17 | Hussain Ali Baba | | (substituted on) 66' |
| FW | 11 | Ismail Abdullatif | | (substituted on) 78' |
| FW | 20 | Sami Al-Husaini | | (substituted on) 78' |
Manager:
Marjan Eid

| GK | 1 | Majed Naser (c) |
| RB | 14 | Abdelaziz Sanqour |
| CB | 8 | Hamdan Al-Kamali | (substituted off) 80' |
| CB | 23 | Mohamed Ahmed |
| LB | 3 | Walid Abbas |
| DM | 16 | Mohamed Abdulrahman | (substituted off) 62' |
| RM | 13 | Khamis Esmaeel |
| LM | 5 | Amer Abdulrahman |
| AM | 10 | Omar Abdulrahman |
| CF | 7 | Ali Mabkhout |
| CF | 11 | Ahmed Khalil | (substituted off) 87' |
Substitutions:
| MF | 15 | Ismail Al Hammadi | (substituted on) 62' |
| DF | 19 | Ismail Ahmed | (substituted on) 80' |
| MF | 4 | Habib Fardan | (substituted on) 87' |
Manager:
Mahdi Ali

Man of the Match:

- Omar Abdulrahman (United Arab Emirates)

Assistant referees:

- Jakhongir Saidov (Uzbekistan)
- Chow Chun Kit (Hong Kong)

Fourth official:

- Yudai Yamamoto (Japan)

Fifth official:

- Najah Raham Alhamaidah (Iraq)

=== Qatar vs Iran ===
Sardar Azmoun's goal ensured Iran and the United Arab Emirates would meet in Brisbane on 19 January to determine who would claim top spot in Group C after Carlos Queiroz's side defeated Qatar 1–0 at Stadium Australia. The result means that Qatar are out of the tournament having previously lost their opening game 4–1 against the United Arab Emirates.

A crowd of 22,672 traveled out to Stadium Australia, with the vast majority backing Iran and turning the iconic venue into a mini Azadi Stadium and, for the opening quarter of the game, the atmosphere was more noteworthy than the play on display as both sides battled for supremacy in midfield. It was the Iranians who steadily took control and by the end of the half Queiroz's team would have been disappointed not to have been in front. Ashkan Dejagah stumbled his way past Abdelkarim Hassan before pulling the ball back for Masoud Shojaei, but the ball was cleared before the former Osasuna striker could pull the trigger. Shojaei was involved again five minutes from the break as Iran continued to press, only this time his effort was deflected wide for a corner that Andranik Teymourian swung towards the penalty spot before Morteza Pouraliganji's header was cleared off the line by Ahmed Abdul Maqsoud. Minutes later, Dejagah's low shot-cum-cross flew across the face of goal with Ehsan Hajsafi just too slow to poke the ball across the line. Seven minutes after the restart, though, Iran finally took the lead they deserved, with Azmoun's moment of brilliance capping a fine move that featured tenacity and quality in equal measure.

Teymourian won the ball deep in the Qatari half before laying off to Dejagah, and Azmoun spun around the Al-Arabi striker's ball into the centre before slipping the ball past Burhan to send the Iranian team into a bench-clearing celebration. Azmoun, however, was not to finish the game, going off injured 10 minutes after his goal, and his replacement, Reza Ghoochannejhad had ample opportunity to finish off the game.

On five occasions in the final quarter of the game the man from Charlton Athletic tried his luck, but each time he was unable to find a way past Burhan, but it mattered little as referee Ravshan Irmatov blew the whistle to send Iran into the quarter-finals for a sixth straight AFC Asian Cup.

15 January 2015
20:00 AEDT (UTC+11)

| Qatar | 0–1 | Iran |
|---|---|---|
| | Report | Azmoun 52' |

Stadium Australia, Sydney
Attendance: 22,672
Referee: Ravshan Irmatov (Uzbekistan)

| Qatar | Iran |

| GK | 1 | Qasem Burhan |
| RB | 18 | Mohammed Tresor Abdullah |
| CB | 4 | Almahdi Ali Mukhtar | (yellow card) 49' |
| CB | 13 | Ibrahim Majid (c) |
| LB | 3 | Abdelkarim Hassan |
| CM | 20 | Karim Boudiaf |
| CM | 23 | Ahmed Abdul Maqsoud | | (substituted off) 73' |
| RW | 17 | Ismaeel Mohammad | | (substituted off) 59' |
| AM | 16 | Boualem Khoukhi |
| LW | 11 | Hassan Al-Haydos |
| CF | 19 | Mohammed Muntari |
Substitutions:
| MF | 10 | Khalfan Ibrahim | | (substituted on) 59' |
| FW | 9 | Meshal Abdullah | | (substituted on) 73' |
Manager:
(Algeria) Djamel Belmadi

| GK | 1 | Alireza Haghighi |
| RB | 11 | Vouria Ghafouri |
| CB | 4 | Jalal Hosseini |
| CB | 8 | Morteza Pouraliganji |
| LB | 23 | Mehrdad Pooladi |
| CM | 14 | Andranik Teymourian | | (substituted off) 87' |
| CM | 6 | Javad Nekounam (c) |
| RW | 21 | Ashkan Dejagah |
| AM | 7 | Masoud Shojaei | (yellow card) 57' | (substituted off) 72' |
| LW | 3 | Ehsan Hajsafi |
| CF | 20 | Sardar Azmoun | | (substituted off) 62' |
Substitutions:
| FW | 16 | Reza Ghoochannejhad | | (substituted on) 62' |
| DF | 2 | Khosro Heydari | | (substituted on) 72' |
| DF | 5 | Amir Hossein Sadeghi | | (substituted on) 87' |
Manager:
(Portugal) Carlos Queiroz

Man of the Match:

- Andranik Teymourian (Iran)

Assistant referees:

- Abdukhamidullo Rasulov (Uzbekistan)
- Bakhadyr Kochkarov (Kyrgyzstan)

Fourth official:

- Mohd Amirul Izwan (Malaysia)

Fifth official:

- Jeffrey Goh Gek Pheng (Singapore)

=== Iran vs United Arab Emirates ===
Reza Ghoochannejhad's last-gasp header gave Iran a 1–0 victory over the United Arab Emirates as Carlos Queiroz's men won Group C of the AFC Asian Cup. Samsung Player of the Match Ghoochannejhad's 91st-minute strike, his first goal of the tournament dealt UAE their first defeat of the tournament and allowed Iran to finish the group phase with the maximum nine points, three points ahead of Mahdi Ali's side.

Iran would face the runners-up of Group D in the quarter-finals on 23 January in Canberra while UAE would play the Group D winners in Sydney, widely expected to be defending champions Japan. Queiroz had predicted a day earlier that neither team would be content with a draw, and the Persian Gulf rivals proved the Portuguese tactician right by staging a cagey match at Brisbane Stadium. The game was marked by Iran's defensive resolve that almost produced a clean-sheet against Argentina at the 2014 FIFA World Cup and suffocated UAE for the most part. UAE did not have a single shot on target for the whole game.

Alireza Jahanbakhsh should have done better with a free header from the centre of the penalty area in the 18th minute but the Dutch-based striker fired over the crossbar towards the stands. The Iranians went close again in the final minute of the half, yet Sardar Azmoun's header at the right-hand post was cleared wide in the nick of time by Mohanad Salem as the two teams headed into the intermission on equal terms. The second half was more of the same, with UAE playmaker Omar Abdulrahman unable to find the touches to get his team going. Despite the pressure from Iran, Abdulrahman set up Abdelaziz Sanqour for an angular shot from the right, but the Al-Ahli man failed to keep his effort on goal.

Queiroz tried to inject some steam into the Iranian attack by bringing Ghoochannejhad and Ashkan Dejagah off the bench, but UAE also held firm at the back to frustrate their opponents. But Iran would have the last laugh as midfielder Andranik Teymourian unintentionally hit a half-clearance back into the box for Ghoochannejhad, who nodded in from close range as the predominantly Iranian crowd went wild. Mahdi Ali claimed after the match that Nekounam was offside when Ghoochannejhad had scored and questioned about the referee assignment.

19 January 2015
19:00 AEST (UTC+10)

| Iran | 1–0 | United Arab Emirates |
|---|---|---|
| Ghoochannejhad 90+1' | Report |

Brisbane Stadium, Brisbane
Attendance: 11,394
Referee: Ryuji Sato (Japan)

| Iran | United Arab Emirates |

| GK | 1 | Alireza Haghighi |
| RB | 2 | Khosro Heydari | | (substituted off) 66' |
| CB | 4 | Jalal Hosseini |
| CB | 8 | Morteza Pouraliganji |
| LB | 23 | Mehrdad Pooladi | (yellow card) 63' |
| CM | 14 | Andranik Teymourian |
| CM | 6 | Javad Nekounam (c) | (yellow card) 36' |
| RW | 18 | Alireza Jahanbakhsh | | (substituted off) 58' |
| AM | 17 | Soroush Rafiei |
| LW | 13 | Vahid Amiri |
| CF | 20 | Sardar Azmoun | (yellow card) 45+2' | (substituted off) 72' |
Substitutions:
| DF | 11 | Vouria Ghafouri | | (substituted on) 58' |
| FW | 21 | Ashkan Dejagah | | (substituted on) 66' |
| FW | 16 | Reza Ghoochannejhad | | (substituted on) 72' |
Manager:
(Portugal) Carlos Queiroz

| GK | 1 | Majed Naser (c) |
| RB | 14 | Abdelaziz Sanqour |
| CB | 23 | Mohamed Ahmed |
| CB | 6 | Mohanad Salem |
| LB | 3 | Walid Abbas | (yellow card) 26' |
| CM | 13 | Khamis Esmaeel |
| CM | 5 | Amer Abdulrahman |
| RW | 7 | Ali Mabkhout |
| AM | 10 | Omar Abdulrahman |
| LW | 4 | Habib Fardan |
| CF | 11 | Ahmed Khalil |
Manager:
Mahdi Ali

Man of the Match:

- Reza Ghoochannejhad (Iran)

Assistant referees:

- Toru Sagara (Japan)
- Toshiyuki Nagi (Japan)

Fourth official:

- Muhammad Taqi Al-Jaafari (Singapore)

Fifth official:

- Jeffrey Goh Gek Pheng (Singapore)

=== Qatar vs Bahrain ===
Bahrain ended their campaign with a 2–1 win over Qatar at Stadium Australia when a long-range strike from Sayed Jaafar Ahmed eight minutes from time gave Marjan Eid's side their first points of the tournament. Neither team had any chance of advancing to the knockout rounds after losing their opening matches against Iran and the United Arab Emirates, but Bahrain reclaimed some pride when Jaafar struck to secure the win after Sayed Saeed had put the Bahrainis in front before Hassan Al-Haydos equalised with a second half free kick.

The win ensures Bahrain finished third in Group, but Eid's team were comprehensively outplayed by the Qataris for large periods of the game and the 2011 tournament hosts would have gone into the halftime break wondering how they had not found the back of the net. Misfortune cost the Arabian Gulf Cup champions on more than one occasion, with Mohammed Muntari twice going close, the first when he steered the ball just wide of Hamed Al-Doseri's goal in the 20th minute and the second, four minutes later, when his header from Al-Haydos' free kick came back off the post.

Bahrain, though, always carried a threat in an open and entertaining game. Shubbar's sixth-minute header was straight at Qasem Burhan, while the 22-year-old had another headed effort in the 29th minute that came back off the base of the post. With 11 minutes remaining in the half, however, the Al-Riffa striker put his side in the lead when Faouzi Aaish slalomed past two Qatari defenders before cutting the ball back to Shubbar, who steadied himself before sliding a left foot shot over the line. Qatar continued to pick holes in the Bahrain backline into the second half, with Ali Assadalla evading the defence thanks to a one-two with Muntari, only to hit goalkeeper Al-Doseri with his shot.

Midway through the half, though, the Qataris finally claimed the goal their possession play deserved when Al Haydos, their star performer on the evening struck a low free kick that went under the Bahraini wall as it jumped before beating the keeper to his right. Another pair of missed opportunities from Muntari continued to frustrate the Qataris and, as the young striker grew increasingly despondent, he and his teammates were punished in the harshest manner possible when Jaafar scored the winner with just eight minutes remaining. Picking the ball up on the corner of the penalty area, the Al Riffa midfielder clipped his shot over the head of Burhan, who had taken a step off his line and the ball sailed into the back of the net.

19 January 2015
20:00 AEDT (UTC+11)

| Qatar | 1–2 | Bahrain |
|---|---|---|
| Al-Haydos 68' | Report | Saeed 34'; Ahmed 82' |

Stadium Australia, Sydney
Attendance: 4,841
Referee: Abdullah Al Hilali (Oman)

| Qatar | Bahrain |

| GK | 1 | Qasem Burhan |
| RB | 4 | Almahdi Ali Mukhtar |
| CB | 16 | Boualem Khoukhi | | (substituted off) 85' |
| CB | 20 | Karim Boudiaf |
| LB | 13 | Ibrahim Majid (c) |
| RM | 18 | Mohammed Tresor Abdullah |
| CM | 5 | Abdulaziz Hatem | (yellow card) 34' | (substituted off) 46' |
| LM | 7 | Khalid Muftah |
| AM | 11 | Hassan Al-Haydos |
| AM | 8 | Ali Assadalla | | (substituted off) 65' |
| CF | 19 | Mohammed Muntari |
Substitutions:
| MF | 23 | Ahmed Abdul Maqsoud | | (substituted on) 46' |
| MF | 12 | Magid Mohamed | | (substituted on) 65' |
| FW | 9 | Meshal Abdullah | | (substituted on) 85' |
Manager:
(Algeria) Djamel Belmadi

| GK | 21 | Hamed Al-Doseri |
| RB | 15 | Abdullah Omar | | (substituted off) 46' |
| CB | 13 | Abdulla Al-Haza'a |
| CB | 17 | Hussain Ali Baba (c) | (yellow card) 53' |
| LB | 23 | Rashed Al-Hooti |
| RM | 4 | Sayed Saeed |
| CM | 8 | Sayed Ahmed |
| CM | 7 | Abdulwahab Al-Safi |
| LM | 9 | Abdulwahab Al-Malood | | (substituted off) 75' |
| CF | 12 | Faouzi Aaish |
| CF | 14 | Jaycee John Okwunwanne | | (substituted off) 85' |
Substitutions:
| FW | 20 | Sami Al-Husaini | | (substituted on) 46' |
| MF | 6 | Abdulla Yaser | (yellow card) 90+3' | (substituted on) 75' |
| FW | 16 | Abdulla Yusuf Helal | | (substituted on) 85' |
Manager:
Marjan Eid

Man of the Match:

- Faouzi Aaish (Bahrain)

Assistant referees:

- Hamad Al-Mayahi (Oman)
- Abu Bakar Al-Amri (Oman)

Fourth official:

- Hettikamkanamge Perera (Sri Lanka)

Fifth official:

- Najah Raham Rashid (Iraq)
