= 22nd Arabian Gulf Cup squads =

Below are the squads for the 22nd Arabian Gulf Cup in Saudi Arabia, held in 2014. Caps and goals are correct prior to the tournament.

== Group A ==
=== Saudi Arabia ===
Coach: (Spain) Juan Ramón López Caro

No.	Pos.	Player	Date of birth (age)	Caps	Goals	Club
1	GK	Waleed Abdullah	April 19, 1986 (aged 28)	60	0	(Saudi Arabian Football Federation) Al-Shabab
21	GK	Abdullah Al-Sudairy	February 2, 1992 (aged 22)	1	0	(Saudi Arabian Football Federation) Al-Hilal
22	GK	Abdullah Al-Enezi	September 20, 1990 (aged 24)	2	0	(Saudi Arabian Football Federation) Al-Nassr
2	DF	Saeed Al Mowalad	March 9, 1991 (aged 23)	1	0	(Saudi Arabian Football Federation) Al-Ahli
3	DF	Osama Hawsawi	March 31, 1984 (aged 30)	98	6	(Saudi Arabian Football Federation) Al-Ahli
4	DF	Abdullah Al-Zori	August 13, 1987 (aged 27)	39	1	(Saudi Arabian Football Federation) Al-Hilal
5	DF	Omar Hawsawi	September 27, 1985 (aged 29)	4	1	(Saudi Arabian Football Federation) Al-Nassr
13	DF	Motaz Hawsawi	February 17, 1992 (aged 22)	4	0	(Saudi Arabian Football Federation) Al-Ahli
23	DF	Majed Al-Marshedi	January 11, 1984 (aged 30)	18	0	(Saudi Arabian Football Federation) Al-Shabab
6	MF	Mustafa Al-Bassas	June 2, 1993 (aged 21)	11	0	(Saudi Arabian Football Federation) Al-Ahli
7	MF	Salman Al-Faraj	August 1, 1989 (aged 25)	6	0	(Saudi Arabian Football Federation) Al-Hilal
8	MF	Yahya Al-Shehri	September 26, 1990 (aged 24)	23	0	(Saudi Arabian Football Federation) Al-Nassr
10	MF	Nawaf Al-Abid	May 30, 1990 (aged 24)	18	0	(Saudi Arabian Football Federation) Al-Hilal
11	MF	Abdulfattah Asiri	February 26, 1994 (aged 20)	3	0	(Saudi Arabian Football Federation) Al-Ittihad
12	MF	Abdulmalek Al-Khaibri	March 18, 1986 (aged 28)	6	0	(Saudi Arabian Football Federation) Al-Shabab
14	MF	Saud Kariri	June 8, 1980 (aged 34)	125	6	(Saudi Arabian Football Federation) Al-Hilal
16	MF	Waleed Bakshween	November 12, 1990 (aged 24)	7	0	(Saudi Arabian Football Federation) Al-Ahli
17	MF	Taisir Al-Jassim	July 25, 1984 (aged 30)	93	10	(Saudi Arabian Football Federation) Al-Ahli
18	MF	Salem Al-Dawsari	August 19, 1991 (aged 23)	13	1	(Saudi Arabian Football Federation) Al-Hilal
9	FW	Naif Hazazi	January 11, 1989 (aged 25)	40	11	(Saudi Arabian Football Federation) Al-Shabab
15	FW	Nasser Al-Shamrani	November 23, 1983 (aged 30)	64	13	(Saudi Arabian Football Federation) Al-Hilal
19	FW	Fahad Al-Muwallad	September 14, 1994 (aged 20)	18	4	(Saudi Arabian Football Federation) Al-Ittihad
20	FW	Mukhtar Fallatah	October 15, 1987 (aged 27)	5	0	(Saudi Arabian Football Federation) Al-Ittihad

=== Yemen ===
Coach: (Czech Republic) Miroslav Soukup

No.	Pos.	Player	Date of birth (age)	Caps	Goals	Club
	GK	Mohammad Ibrahim Ayash	6 March 1986 (aged 28)			(Yemen Football Association) Al Hilal Al Sahili
	DF	Mohammed Fuad Omar	13 March 1989 (aged 25)			(Yemen Football Association) Al-Saqr
	DF	Mudir Al-Radaei	30 November 1989 (aged 24)			(Yemen Football Association) Al-Ahli San'a
	DF	Motaz Qaid	15 September 1992 (aged 22)			(Yemen Football Association) Al-Saqr
	DF	Mohammed Boqshan	10 March 1994 (aged 20)			(Yemen Football Association) Al Hilal Al Sahili
	DF	Abdul Muain Al-Jarshi	1 January 1994 (aged 20)			(Yemen Football Association) Al-Wahda Sana'a
	DF	Hamada Al-Zubairi	1 June 1990 (aged 24)			(Yemen Football Association) Al-Ahli San'a
	DF	Nazar Rizq	15 January 1987 (aged 27)			(Yemen Football Association) Al Hilal Al Sahili
	MF	Fuad Al-Omaisi	4 October 1987 (aged 27)			(Saudi Arabian Football Federation) Al-Tai
	MF	Wahid Al Khyat	1 January 1986 (aged 28)			(Yemen Football Association) Al-Ahli San'a
	MF	Alaa Al-Sasi	2 July 1987 (aged 27)			(Yemen Football Association) Al Hilal Al Sahili
	MF	Waleed Al-Hubaishi	2 January 1993 (aged 21)			(Yemen Football Association) Al-Saqr
	MF	Ahmed Ali Al-Hifi	10 November 1993 (aged 21)			(Yemen Football Association) Al-Yarmuk Al-Rawda
	MF	Mohammed Al-Ghamri				(Yemen Football Association) Al-Wahda Sana'a
	MF	Ahmed Alos	3 April 1994 (aged 20)			(Yemen Football Association) Al-Wahda Sana'a
	FW	Abdulwasea Al-Matari	4 July 1994 (aged 20)			(Yemen Football Association) Al-Yarmuk Al-Rawda
	FW	Aiman Al-Hagri	3 February 1992 (aged 22)			(Bahrain Football Association) Al-Najma

=== Bahrain ===
Coach: (Iraq) Adnan Hamad

No.	Pos.	Player	Date of birth (age)	Caps	Goals	Club
	GK	Sayed Mohammed Jaffer	25 August 1985 (aged 29)			(Bahrain Football Association) Al-Muharraq
	DF	Rashed Al-Hooti	24 December 1989 (aged 24)			(Bahrain Football Association) Al-Riffa
	DF	Abdulla Al-Haza'a	19 July 1990 (aged 24)			(Bahrain Football Association) East Riffa Club
	DF	Mohamed Duaij Mahorfi	24 July 1981 (aged 33)			(Bahrain Football Association) Al-Riffa
	DF	Mohamed Husain	18 July 1980 (aged 34)			(Saudi Arabian Football Federation) Al-Nassr
	DF	Hussain Ali Baba	11 February 1982 (aged 32)			(Bahrain Football Association) Al-Muharraq
	MF	Sayed Dhiya Saeed	17 July 1992 (aged 22)			(Bahrain Football Association) Al-Riffa
	MF	Abdulwahab Al-Malood	7 June 1990 (aged 24)			(Bahrain Football Association) Hidd
	MF	Faisal Bodahoom	25 September 1988 (aged 26)			(Bahrain Football Association) East Riffa Club
	MF	Abdulwahab Al-Safi	6 April 1984 (aged 30)			(Bahrain Football Association) Busaiteen Club
	MF	Sayed Jaafar Ahmed	4 March 1991 (aged 23)			(Bahrain Football Association) Al-Riffa
	MF	Abdulla Yaser	27 March 1988 (aged 26)			(Bahrain Football Association) Al-Muharraq
	FW	Ismail Abdullatif	11 September 1986 (aged 28)			(Bahrain Football Association) Al-Muharraq
	FW	Abdulla Yusuf Helal	12 June 1993 (aged 21)			(Bahrain Football Association) East Riffa Club
	FW	Sami Al-Husaini	29 September 1989 (aged 25)			(Bahrain Football Association) Busaiteen Club
	FW	Mohammed Tayeb Al Alawi	13 October 1989 (aged 25)			(Bahrain Football Association) Al-Riffa
	FW	Ahmed Al Khattal	6 October 1988 (aged 26)			(Bahrain Football Association) Hidd
	FW	Mohammed Tayeb Al Alawi	13 October 1989 (aged 25)			(Bahrain Football Association) Al-Riffa

=== Qatar ===
Coach: (Algeria) Djamel Belmadi

No.	Pos.	Player	Date of birth (age)	Caps	Goals	Club
1	GK	Qasem Burhan	15 December 1985 (aged 28)	51	0	(Qatar Football Association) Al-Gharrafa
22	GK	Saad Al-Sheeb	19 February 1990 (aged 24)	11	0	(Qatar Football Association) Al-Sadd
21	GK	Ahmed Soufiane	9 August 1990 (aged 24)	2	0	(Qatar Football Association) El-Jaish
6	DF	Bilal Mohammed	2 June 1986 (aged 28)	61	3	(Qatar Football Association) Al-Gharrafa
2	DF	Mohammed Musa	23 March 1986 (aged 28)	16	0	(Qatar Football Association) Lekhwiya
7	DF	Khalid Muftah	2 July 1992 (aged 22)	23	1	(Qatar Football Association) Lekhwiya
13	DF	Ibrahim Majid	12 May 1990 (aged 24)	48	2	(Qatar Football Association) Al-Sadd
3	DF	Abdelkarim Hassan	28 August 1993 (aged 21)	23	3	(Qatar Football Association) Al-Sadd
4	DF	Almahdi Ali Mukhtar	2 March 1992 (aged 22)	6	1	(Qatar Football Association) Al-Sadd
26	DF	Mosaab Mahmoud Al-Hassan	12 April 1983 (aged 31)	10	0	(Qatar Football Association) El-Jaish
27	DF	Abdurahman Abubakar	3 August 1990 (aged 24)	1	0	(Qatar Football Association) El-Jaish
10	MF	Boualem Khoukhi	7 September 1990 (aged 24)	6	6	(Qatar Football Association) Al-Arabi
5	MF	Abdulaziz Hatem	28 October 1990 (aged 24)	12	0	(Qatar Football Association) Al-Arabi
17	MF	Ismaeel Mohammad	5 April 1990 (aged 24)	9	0	(Qatar Football Association) Lekhwiya
12	MF	Karim Boudiaf	16 September 1989 (aged 25)	5	0	(Qatar Football Association) Lekhwiya
11	MF	Ali Assadalla	19 January 1993 (aged 21)	5	1	(Qatar Football Association) Al-Sadd
25	MF	Ahmed Abdul Maqsoud	7 August 1989 (aged 25)	2	1	(Qatar Football Association) Umm-Salal
8	MF	Khalid Abdulraouf	14 November 1989 (aged 24)	4	0	(Qatar Football Association) El-Jaish
28	MF	Wesam Rizik	25 February 1981 (aged 33)	85	6	(Qatar Football Association) El-Jaish
20	FW	Meshal Abdullah (Captain)	2 May 1984 (aged 30)	26	4	(Qatar Football Association) Al-Ahli
15	FW	Hassan Al-Haydos	11 December 1990 (aged 23)	38	1	(Qatar Football Association) Al-Sadd
16	FW	Magid Mohamed	11 October 1985 (aged 29)	39	8	(Qatar Football Association) El-Jaish

== Group B ==
=== United Arab Emirates ===
Coach: (United Arab Emirates) Mahdi Ali

No.	Pos.	Player	Date of birth (age)	Club
	GK	Ali Khasif	August 9, 1987 (aged 27)	(United Arab Emirates Football Association) Al Jazira
	GK	Khalid Eisa	September 15, 1989 (aged 25)	(United Arab Emirates Football Association) Al Ain
	DF	Abdulaziz Haikal	September 10, 1990 (aged 24)	(United Arab Emirates Football Association) Al-Ahli Dubai
	DF	Abdelaziz Sanqour	May 7, 1989 (aged 25)	(United Arab Emirates Football Association) Al-Ahli Dubai
	DF	Mohanad Salem	March 1, 1985 (aged 29)	(United Arab Emirates Football Association) Al Ain
	DF	Mohamed Ahmed	April 16, 1989 (aged 25)	(United Arab Emirates Football Association) Al Ain
	DF	Walid Abbas	June 11, 1985 (aged 29)	(United Arab Emirates Football Association) Al-Ahli Dubai
	DF	Mohamed Fawzi	February 22, 1990 (aged 24)	(United Arab Emirates Football Association) Al Ain
	DF	Mohamed Ismail Ahmed	July 7, 1983 (aged 31)	(United Arab Emirates Football Association) Al Ain
	MF	Khamis Esmaeel	August 16, 1989 (aged 25)	(United Arab Emirates Football Association) Al Jazira
	MF	Omar Abdulrahman	September 20, 1991 (aged 23)	(United Arab Emirates Football Association) Al Ain
	MF	Amer Abdulrahman	July 3, 1989 (aged 25)	(United Arab Emirates Football Association) Baniyas Club
	MF	Habib Al Fardan	November 11, 1990 (aged 24)	(United Arab Emirates Football Association) Al-Ahli Dubai
	MF	Majed Hassan	August 1, 1992 (aged 22)	(United Arab Emirates Football Association) Al-Ahli Dubai
	MF	Rashid Eissa Al-Falasi	August 24, 1990 (aged 24)	(United Arab Emirates Football Association) Al Ain
	FW	Ahmed Khalil Aljunaibi	June 8, 1991 (aged 23)	(United Arab Emirates Football Association) Al-Ahli Dubai
	FW	Ali Mabkhout	October 5, 1990 (aged 24)	(United Arab Emirates Football Association) Al Jazira
	FW	Ismail Al Hammadi	July 1, 1988 (aged 26)	(United Arab Emirates Football Association) Al-Ahli Dubai
	FW	Ismail Matar	April 7, 1983 (aged 31)	(United Arab Emirates Football Association) Al Wahda FC
	FW	Mohammed Abdulrahman	February 14, 1989 (aged 25)	(United Arab Emirates Football Association) Al Ain
	FW	Yousif Saeed	September 4, 1994 (aged 20)	(United Arab Emirates Football Association) Sharjah

=== Iraq ===
Coach: (Iraq) Hakeem Shaker

No.	Pos.	Player	Date of birth (age)	Club
1	GK	Ali Yasin	August 9, 1993 (aged 21)	(Iraq Football Association) Naft Al-Janoob
2	DF	Ahmad Ibrahim	February 25, 1992 (aged 22)	(United Arab Emirates Football Association) Ajman
3	DF	Ali Bahjat	March 3, 1992 (aged 22)	(Iraq Football Association) Al-Shorta
4	DF	Mustafa Nadhim	September 23, 1993 (aged 21)	(Iraq Football Association) Al-Quwa Al-Jawiya
5	DF	Saad Natiq	March 19, 1994 (aged 20)	(Iraq Football Association) Al-Masafi
6	DF	Ali Adnan	December 19, 1993 (aged 20)	(Turkish Football Federation) Rizespor
7	FW	Hammadi Ahmad	18 October 1989 (aged 23)	(Iraq Football Association) Al-Quwa Al-Jawiya
8	MF	Saif Salman	1 July 1993 (aged 19)	(Iraq Football Association) Al-Quwa Al-Jawiya
9	MF	Ahmed Yasin	22 April 1991 (aged 21)	(Swedish Football Association) Örebro
10	MF	Saad Abdul-Amir	January 19, 1992 (aged 22)	(Iraq Football Association) Erbil
11	MF	Humam Tariq	February 10, 1996 (aged 18)	(United Arab Emirates Football Association) Al-Ahli
12	GK	Jalal Hassan	May 18, 1991 (aged 23)	(Iraq Football Association) Erbil
13	MF	Karrar Jassim	March 15, 1987 (aged 27)	(Football Federation Islamic Republic of Iran) Esteghlal
14	DF	Salam Shaker	July 31, 1986 (aged 28)	(Iraq Football Association) Al-Shorta
15	FW	Justin Meram	December 4, 1988 (aged 25)	(United States Soccer Federation) Columbus Crew
16	MF	Yaser Kasim	May 10, 1991 (aged 23)	(The Football Association) Swindon Town
17	FW	Amjad Kalaf	March 20, 1991 (aged 23)	(Iraq Football Association) Al-Shorta
18	MF	Mahdi Karim	December 10, 1983 (aged 30)	(Iraq Football Association) Al-Shorta
19	MF	Mahdi Kamel	January 6, 1995 (aged 19)	(Iraq Football Association) Al-Shorta
20	FW	Amjad Radhi	July 17, 1990 (aged 24)	(Iraq Football Association) Erbil
21	DF	Ali Faez	September 9, 1994 (aged 20)	(Iraq Football Association) Erbil
22	GK	Mohammed Hameed	January 24, 1993 (aged 21)	(Iraq Football Association) Al-Shorta
23	FW	Marwan Hussein	January 26, 1992 (aged 22)	(Iraq Football Association) Al-Shorta

=== Kuwait ===
Coach: (Brazil) Jorvan Vieira

No.	Pos.	Player	Date of birth (age)	Caps	Goals	Club
	GK	Sulaiman Abdulgahfoor	11 January 1985 (age 41)	1	0	(Kuwait Football Association) Kuwait
	GK	Nawaf Al Khaldi	25 May 1981 (age 45)	100	0	(Kuwait Football Association) Qadsia
	GK	Hameed Youssef Al-Qallaf	10 August 1987 (age 39)	16	0	(Kuwait Football Association) Al-Arabi SC
	DF	Ali Maqseed	11 November 1986 (age 39)	16	2	(Kuwait Football Association) Al-Arabi SC
	DF	Fahad Awadh	26 February 1985 (age 41)	27	2	(Kuwait Football Association) Kuwait
	DF	Amer Al Fadhel	21 April 1988 (age 38)	14	0	(Kuwait Football Association) Qadsia
	DF	Hussain Fadel	29 July 1988 (age 38)	37	2	(United Arab Emirates Football Association) Al-Wahda FC)
	DF	Mohammad Frieh	24 November 1988 (age 37)	5	0	(Kuwait Football Association) Al-Arabi SC
	DF	Hussain Hakem	26 June 1984 (age 42)	5	0	(Kuwait Football Association) Kuwait
	DF	Musaed Neda	8 July 1983 (age 43)	70	15	(Saudi Arabian Football Federation) Al-Oruba FC
	MF	Waleed Ali	3 November 1980 (age 45)	103	9	(Kuwait Football Association) Kuwait
	MF	Talal Al Amer	22 February 1987 (age 39)	21	0	(Kuwait Football Association) Qadsia
	MF	Fahad Al Ansari	16 September 1991 (age 35)	21	1	(Kuwait Football Association) Qadsia
	MF	Jarah Al Ateeqi	15 October 1981 (age 44)	48	3	(Kuwait Football Association) Kuwait
	MF	Saleh Al Sheikh	29 May 1982 (age 44)	39	1	(Kuwait Football Association) Qadsia
	MF	Aziz Mashaan	19 October 1988 (age 37)	21	8	(French Football Federation) Montpellier
	MF	Talal Nayef	10 November 1985 (age 40)	15	0	(Kuwait Football Association) Al-Arabi SC
	FW	Saif Al Hashan	1 January 1992 (age 34)	6	5	(Kuwait Football Association) Qadsia
	FW	Bader Al Mutawa	10 January 1985 (age 41)	141	46	(Kuwait Football Association) Qadsia
	FW	Abdulhadi Khamis	19 December 1990 (age 35)	6	5	(Kuwait Football Association) Kuwait
	FW	Yousef Nasser	9 October 1990 (age 35)	45	28	(Kuwait Football Association) Kazma SC
	DF	Fahad Al-Rashidi	31 December 1984 (age 41)	16	2	(Kuwait Football Association) Al-Arabi SC

=== Oman ===
Coach: (France) Paul Le Guen

No.	Pos.	Player	Date of birth (age)	Club
1	GK	Ali Al-Habsi (Captain)	December 30, 1981 (aged 32)	(The Football Association) Brighton & Hove Albion
2	DF	Mohammed Al-Musalami	April 27, 1990 (aged 24)	(Oman Football Association) Fanja
3	DF	Jaber Al-Owaisi	November 4, 1989 (aged 25)	(Oman Football Association) Al-Shabab
4	DF	Ali Al-Jabri	January 29, 1990 (aged 24)	(Oman Football Association) Fanja
5	DF	Nasser Al-Shimli	February 15, 1989 (aged 25)	(Oman Football Association) Al-Oruba
6	DF	Raed Ibrahim Saleh	June 9, 1992 (aged 22)	(Oman Football Association) Fanja
7	FW	Hussain Al-Hadhri	May 21, 1990 (aged 24)	(Oman Football Association) Dhofar
8	MF	Eid Al-Farsi	January 31, 1987 (aged 27)	(Oman Football Association) Al-Oruba
9	MF	Abdulaziz Al-Muqbali	April 23, 1989 (aged 25)	(Oman Football Association) Fanja
10	MF	Qasim Said	April 20, 1989 (aged 25)	(Oman Football Association) Al-Nasr
11	MF	Saad Al-Mukhaini	September 6, 1987 (aged 27)	(Oman Football Association) Al-Oruba
12	MF	Ahmed Mubarak Al-Mahaijri	February 23, 1985 (aged 29)	(Oman Football Association) Al-Oruba
13	MF	Abdul Salam Al-Mukhaini	April 7, 1988 (aged 26)	(Oman Football Association) Al-Oruba
14	DF	Hani Al-Dhabit	October 15, 1979 (aged 35)	(Oman Football Association) Dhofar Club
15	FW	Ali Salim Al-Nahar	August 21, 1992 (aged 22)	(Oman Football Association) Dhofar Club
16	MF	Ali Al-Busaidi	January 21, 1991 (aged 23)	(Oman Football Association) Al-Nahda
17	MF	Hassan Mudhafar Al-Gheilani	June 26, 1980 (aged 34)	(Oman Football Association) Al-Oruba
18	GK	Mazin Al-Kasbi	April 27, 1993 (aged 21)	(Oman Football Association) Fanja
19	MF	Fahad Al-Jalabubi	August 14, 1990 (aged 24)	(Oman Football Association) Saham
20	FW	Mohammed Al-Siyabi	December 21, 1988 (aged 25)	(Oman Football Association) Al-Shabab
21	DF	Said Al-Ruzaiqi	December 12, 1986 (aged 27)	(Oman Football Association) Al-Nahda
22	GK	Mohannad Al-Zaabi	October 25, 1992 (aged 22)	(Oman Football Association) Al-Khaboora
23	FW	Juma Darwish Al-Mashari	September 29, 1984 (aged 30)	(Oman Football Association) Al-Nasr
