= 2015 AFC Asian Cup knockout stage =

The knockout stage of the 2015 AFC Asian Cup was the second and final stage of the 2015 AFC Asian Cup, following the group stage. It was played on 22 to 31 January, began with the quarter-finals and ended with the final match of the tournament, held at Stadium Australia, Sydney. The top two teams from each group (eight in total) advanced to the knockout stage to compete in a single-elimination tournament. A third-place match was played between the two losing teams of the semi-finals (United Arab Emirates and Iraq). Australia won the trophy after defeating South Korea in the final.

In all matches in the knockout stage, if the score were level at the end of 90 minutes, two 15-minute periods of extra time was played. If the score were still level after extra time, the match was decided by a penalty shoot-out.

== Qualified teams ==
The top two placed teams from each of the four groups advanced to the knockout stage.

Group	Winners	Runners-up
A	South Korea	Australia
B	China	Uzbekistan
C	Iran	United Arab Emirates
D	Japan	Iraq

== Bracket ==
Quarter-finals
22 January – Melbourne
South Korea (a.e.t.)	2
Uzbekistan	0
23 January – Canberra
Iran	3 (6)
Iraq (p)	3 (7)
22 January – Brisbane
China	0
Australia	2
23 January – Sydney
Japan	1 (4)
United Arab Emirates (p)	1 (5)

Semi-finals
26 January – Sydney
South Korea	2
Iraq	0
27 January – Newcastle
Australia	2
United Arab Emirates	0

Final
31 January – Sydney
South Korea	1
Australia (a.e.t.)	2
Third place
30 January – Newcastle
Iraq	2
United Arab Emirates	3

Scores after extra time are indicated by (a.e.t.), and penalty shoot-out are indicated by (pen.).

== Quarter-finals ==
=== South Korea vs Uzbekistan ===
Two-time champions South Korea secured a third consecutive appearance in the semi-finals after edging out Uzbekistan 2–0 in a thrilling quarter-final at Melbourne Rectangular Stadium. Son Heung-min netted with just over a minute of the first half of extra-time remaining following an entertaining yet goalless 90 minutes of normal time, which was the first draw of the tournament, before repeating the feat at the end of the second period and having followed up their win over Uzbekistan in the third place play-off at the 2011 AFC Asian Cup with a fourth consecutive win of the 2015 campaign without conceding a goal, Uli Stielike's Group A winners would face either Iran or Iraq in semi-final at Stadium Australia in Sydney.

Group B runners-up Uzbekistan had made a positive start as lone striker Bakhodir Nasimov and Sanjar Tursunov tested South Korea goalkeeper Kim Jin-hyeon inside the first 20 minutes before Odil Ahmedov volleyed over on the edge of the six-yard area from Vitaliy Denisov's left wing cross. South Korea, though, finally created their first chance of note midway through the first half as Ignatiy Nesterov produced a superb double block to deny Lee Keun-ho and Nam Tae-hee before the Uzbekistan goalkeeper was at full-stretch moments later to superbly produce a one-handed flying save to push Son's curling effort from just inside the area over the crossbar. But Uzbekistan's chances were dealt a huge blow 16 minutes before half-time as captain Ahmedov was forced off with an injury to be replaced by Timur Kapadze, and despite beginning the contest on the back foot, South Korea fought back to finish the first half on top. Nesterov remained the busier of the two goalkeepers at the start of the second half with another flying one-handed save to beat away Lee Jung-hyup's header from Ki Sung-yueng's 47th-minute free kick.

Both sides, though, enjoyed plenty of possession inside the final third during an open second 45 minutes with the goalkeepers at either end of the field having to remain on their toes as Lee Keun-ho fired into the side netting with just under 20 minutes remaining following a lapse in concentration by the Uzbekistan defence. South Korea then enjoyed their own stroke of luck with 12 minutes remaining as Lutfulla Turaev headed wide at the back post from Sardor Rashidov's chipped cross with the goal at his mercy and goalkeeper Kim struggling to recover. Group A winners South Korea were able to finish the end of normal time on top, but after Nam failed to connect with the goal at his mercy inside the final 10 minutes, the first draw of the tournament sent the tie to extra-time.

But with just over a minute of the first half of extra-time remaining, Nesterov was unable to hold Son's stooping close range header from Kim Jin-su's deflected cross and the ball crept across the line to finally break the deadlock after Shukhrat Mukhammadiev had conceded possession close to the touchline. And with just over a minute remaining at the end of the second half of extra-time Son repeated the feat as the forward fired high into the roof of the net from Cha Du-ri's pass with Uzbekistan caught short at the back as they searched for an equaliser.

22 January 2015
18:30 AEDT (UTC+11)

South Korea	2–0 (a.e.t.)	Uzbekistan
Son Heung-min 104', 119'	Report

Melbourne Rectangular Stadium, Melbourne
Attendance: 23,381
Referee: Fahad Al-Mirdasi (Saudi Arabia)

South Korea	Uzbekistan

GK	23	Kim Jin-hyeon
RB	2	Kim Chang-soo		(substituted off) 69'
CB	5	Kwak Tae-hwi	(yellow card) 56'
CB	19	Kim Young-gwon
LB	3	Kim Jin-su
CM	16	Ki Sung-yueng (c)	(yellow card) 115'
CM	6	Park Joo-ho
RW	11	Lee Keun-ho		(substituted off) 111'
AM	10	Nam Tae-hee
LW	7	Son Heung-min
CF	18	Lee Jung-hyup		(substituted off) 82'
Substitutions:
DF	22	Cha Du-ri		(substituted on) 69'
MF	14	Han Kook-young		(substituted on) 82'
DF	20	Jang Hyun-soo		(substituted on) 111'
Manager:
(Germany) Uli Stielike

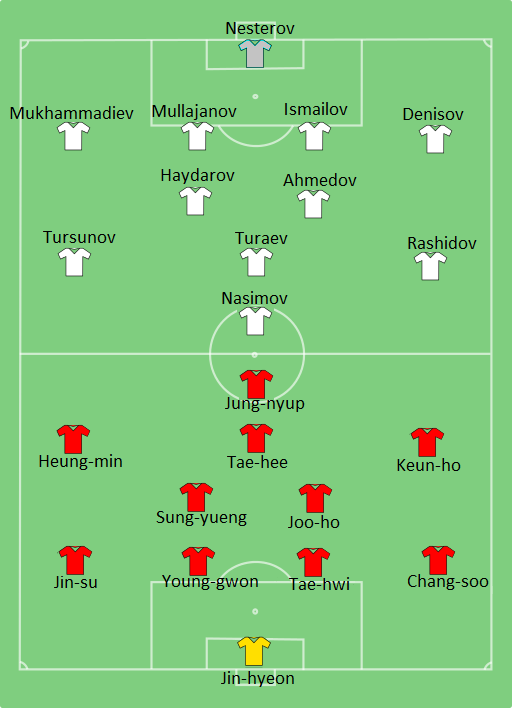

GK	12	Ignatiy Nesterov
RB	14	Shukhrat Mukhammadiev
CB	3	Shavkat Mullajanov
CB	5	Anzur Ismailov	(yellow card) 85'
LB	19	Vitaliy Denisov	(yellow card) 57'
DM	7	Azizbek Haydarov
DM	13	Lutfulla Turaev		(substituted off) 85'
CM	9	Odil Ahmedov (c)		(substituted off) 30'
RF	4	Sardor Rashidov
CF	6	Bahodir Nasimov
LF	17	Sanzhar Tursunov		(substituted off) 105+1'
Substitutions:
MF	18	Timur Kapadze		(substituted on) 30'
MF	10	Jamshid Iskanderov		(substituted on) 85'
FW	11	Igor Sergeev		(substituted on) 105+1'
Manager:
Mirjalol Qosimov

Man of the Match:
Kwak Tae-hwi (South Korea)

Assistant referees:
Abdulla Al Shalwai (Saudi Arabia)
Abu Bakar Al Amri (Oman)
Fourth official:
Abdullah Al Hilali (Oman)
Fifth official:
Badr Al-Shumrani (Saudi Arabia)

=== China vs Australia ===
Tim Cahill's second-half brace sent Australia past China 2–0 and into the semi-finals. Cahill opened the scoring shortly after the break before doubling the lead midway through the second-half with arguably the goal of the tournament as Australia reached the last four for the second successive time. Ange Postecoglou's side would face either holders Japan or the United Arab Emirates in Newcastle for a place in the January 31 final in Sydney. Shortly after South Korea punched their semi-final ticket with a 2–0 extra-time win over Uzbekistan in Melbourne, China got off to the better start as Australia, looking slightly nervous, struggled to settle into the game between the Group B winners and the Group A runners-up at Brisbane Stadium.

The Chinese strike-force of Sun Ke and Wu Lei, with three goals from three matches in the group stage, caused problems for the Australian defence, calling goalkeeper Mathew Ryan into action several times with pace and ferocity. But the good times would not last for China, who could have put Australia under serious pressure had they scored within the first 30 minutes. Controlling more than 77 percent of possession in the first half, Postecoglou's men eventually found their feet, going close a couple of times before the break allowed them to regroup for the second half. In the 49th minute, Cahill did what he does best and opened the scoring for Australia.

China cleared a corner from the right but Mathew Leckie headed right back into the box to keep the attack going. Cahill took advantage of a moment of freedom and hit an acrobatic overhead kick past goalkeeper Wang Dalei, who never saw it coming, reacting too late to the spectacular effort that put the hosts into the driver's seat. The deficit forced China to come out, giving Australia more space to work with and it was Cahill again who capitalised five minutes past the hour, powerfully heading home a cross from left-back Jason Davidson to make it 2–0 and effectively put the game out of their opponents' reach.

22 January 2015
20:30 AEST (UTC+10)

China	0–2	Australia
	Report	Cahill 48', 65'

Brisbane Stadium, Brisbane
Attendance: 46,067
Referee: Kim Jong-hyeok (South Korea)

China	Australia

GK	23	Wang Dalei
RB	5	Zhang Linpeng	(yellow card) 53'
CB	3	Mei Fang		(substituted off) 46'
CB	2	Ren Hang
LB	14	Ji Xiang
DM	10	Zheng Zhi (c)
DM	8	Cai Huikang
CM	15	Wu Xi		(substituted off) 83'
RF	17	Zhang Chengdong
CF	16	Sun Ke		(substituted off) 71'
LF	7	Wu Lei
Substitutions:
DF	4	Jiang Zhipeng		(substituted on) 46'
DF	21	Yu Hai		(substituted on) 71'
FW	9	Yang Xu		(substituted on) 83'
Manager:
(France) Alain Perrin

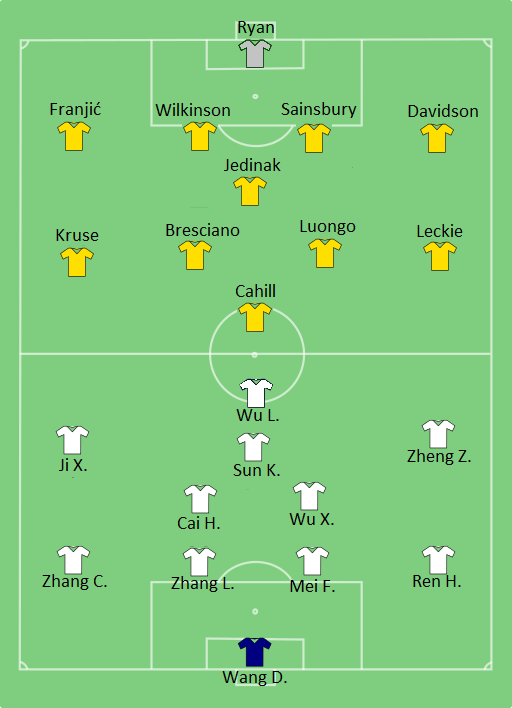

GK	1	Mathew Ryan
RB	2	Ivan Franjić
CB	20	Trent Sainsbury
CB	22	Alex Wilkinson
LB	3	Jason Davidson
DM	15	Mile Jedinak (c)	(yellow card) 19'
CM	23	Mark Bresciano		(substituted off) 60'
CM	21	Massimo Luongo
AM	4	Tim Cahill		(substituted off) 80'
CF	10	Robbie Kruse
CF	7	Mathew Leckie		(substituted off) 69'
Substitutions:
MF	14	James Troisi		(substituted on) 60'
FW	16	Nathan Burns		(substituted on) 69'
DF	5	Mark Milligan		(substituted on) 80'
Manager:
Ange Postecoglou

Man of the Match:
Tim Cahill (Australia)

Assistant referees:
Jeong Hae-sang (South Korea)
Yoon Kwang-yeol (South Korea)
Fourth official:
Abdulrahman Abdou (Qatar)
Fifth official:
Taleb Salem Al-Naemi (Qatar)

=== Iran vs Iraq ===
Salam Shaker scored the winner as Iraq claimed a place in the semi-finals after edging out arch-rivals Iran 7-6 on penalties following a sensational 3–3 draw at Canberra Stadium. Sardar Azmoun had put Iran in front midway through the first-half but his side went into the break a man down after Mehrdad Pooladi was controversially dismissed by referee Ben Williams. Ahmed Yasin's 56th-minute equaliser then took the game to extra-time where Iraq twice went in front through Younis Mahmoud and Dhurgham Ismail but they were pegged back by Morteza Pouraliganji and most dramatically Reza Ghoochannejhad two minutes from the end.

But after Iran substitute Vahid Amiri drilled his penalty onto the left-hand upright, Shaker held his nerve to claim victory for Iraq and take them into the semi-finals with South Korea at the Stadium Australia in Sydney. The opening spells of the match were frenetic and furious but amounted to little before a typical driving run down the right from Ashkan Dejagah on 24 minutes was brought to a halt through a firm tackle from Ismail. Vouria Ghafouri, though, was on hand to pick up the pieces and whip in a venomous cross that Azmoun met with a thumping header into the bottom corner of the goal.

Alireza Haghighi then saved well from Mahmoud with his feet but as the first period drew to a close there was time for a final moment of drama as Pooladi received his second yellow card of the match following a coming together with Iraq goalkeeper Jalal Hassan to see Iran go into the break a man down and within three minutes of the second half Iran almost saw their goal advantage disappear, too, as Yaser Kasim's free-kick was athletically saved by Haghighi who launched himself to his left to tip the ball over the bar. But on 56 minutes, Iraq got the equaliser they had been threatening as Alaa Abdul-Zahra's wicked cross from the left wing evaded defenders and attackers alike before Yasen latched onto the ball at the far post and drove his low angled shot through a group of players and into the net.

Iraq continued to prod and probe at the 10-man side but were unable to take further advantage of their numerical superiority before the whistle was blown for the end of the 90 minutes and a period of extra-time. And the deadlock was blown open in just the second minute of extra time as cross from Ismail saw the ball clip off Haghighi's outstretched leg and pounced upon by Mahmood whose stopping header found the back of the net for his eighth goal in AFC Asian Cup competitions to put Iraq 2–1 up. A sensational spectacle was still not finished there, though, and with three minutes of the first half of extra-time remaining Pouraliganji thundered home Andranik Teymourian's corner with a bullet header to level the scores again.

The defender went from hero to villain with five minutes remaining of the extra-time as his crunching tackle on Kasim saw a penalty awarded to Iraq. Ismail showed impressive composure to drive his spot-kick down the middle of the goal with Haghighi already committed to his right. But with two minutes remaining there was a further twist to the tail as once again from a Teymourian corner, Iran caused consternation in the Iraq defence as Javad Nekounam cannoned his header off the woodwork and Ghoochannejhad was on hand to head home to take the game to penalties.

Ehsan Hajsafi blasted his opening spot kick over the crossbar for Iran, but Saad Abdul-Amir was unable to take advantage and hit his own effort wide and after Amiri hit the post in sudden death, Shaker kept his composure to beat Haghighi and claim victory for Iraq and a place in the semi-finals for the third time in the AFC Asian Cup history.

After the match, the Iranian Football Federation lodged a formal complaint to FIFA after Iraqi midfielder Alaa Abdul-Zahra tested positive for the banned stimulant methylhexanamine, in results that were verified by a WADA-approved laboratory in Cologne. In an email exchange dated September 2014, FIFA promised to take action but there is no record of a suspension for Abdul-Zahra. The AFC disciplinary committee decided that the protest was unfounded and dismissed the case.

23 January 2015
17:30 AEDT (UTC+11)

Iran	3–3 (a.e.t.)	Iraq
Azmoun 24'; Pouraliganji 103'; Ghoochannejhad 119'	Report	Yasin 56'; Mahmoud 93'; Ismail 116' (pen.)
Penalties
Hajsafi (penalty missed); Pouraliganji (penalty scored); Nekounam (penalty scored); Hosseini (penalty scored); Ghafouri (penalty scored); Jahanbakhsh (penalty scored); Teymourian (penalty scored); Amiri (penalty missed)	6–7	(penalty missed) Abdul-Amir; (penalty scored) Salem; (penalty scored) Ismail; (penalty scored) Adnan; (penalty scored) Mahmoud; (penalty scored) Kasim; (penalty scored) Hussein; (penalty scored) Shaker

Canberra Stadium, Canberra
Attendance: 18,921
Referee: Ben Williams (Australia)

Iran	Iraq

GK	1	Alireza Haghighi
RB	11	Vouria Ghafouri
CB	4	Jalal Hosseini
CB	8	Morteza Pouraliganji
LB	23	Mehrdad Pooladi	(yellow card) 22' (yellow-red card) 43'
CM	14	Andranik Teymourian	(yellow card) 90+4'
CM	6	Javad Nekounam (c)
RW	21	Ashkan Dejagah		(substituted off) 84'
AM	7	Masoud Shojaei		(substituted off) 46'
LW	3	Ehsan Hajsafi
CF	20	Sardar Azmoun		(substituted off) 63'
Substitutions:
FW	13	Vahid Amiri		(substituted on) 46'
FW	18	Alireza Jahanbakhsh		(substituted on) 63'
FW	16	Reza Ghoochannejhad		(substituted on) 84'
Other disciplinary actions:
DF	19	Mohammad Reza Khanzadeh	(yellow card) 120'
Manager:
(Portugal) Carlos Queiroz

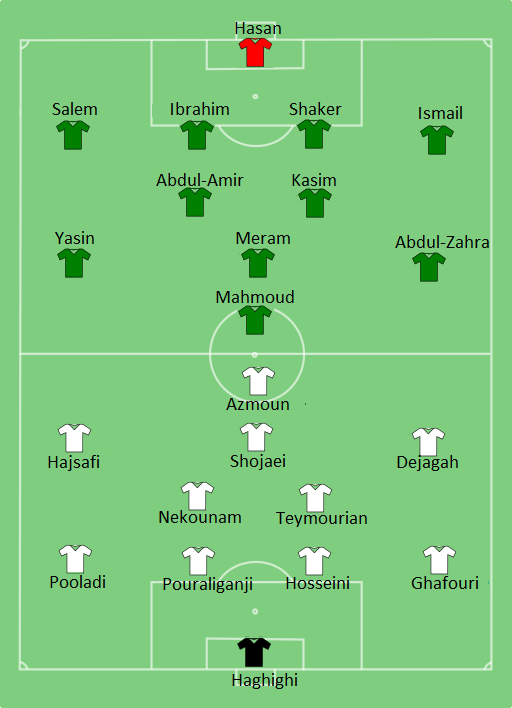

GK	12	Jalal Hasan
RB	23	Waleed Salem	(yellow card) 90+2'
CB	2	Ahmad Ibrahim	(yellow card) 2'
CB	14	Salam Shaker
LB	15	Dhurgham Ismail
CM	21	Saad Abdul-Amir	(yellow card) 102'
CM	5	Yaser Kasim	(yellow card) 68'
RW	9	Ahmed Yasin		(substituted off) 107'
AM	17	Alaa Abdul-Zahra		(substituted off) 65'
LW	8	Justin Meram		(substituted off) 46'
CF	10	Younis Mahmoud (c)	(yellow card) 100'
Substitutions:
FW	16	Marwan Hussein	(yellow card) 120+2'	(substituted on) 46'
DF	6	Ali Adnan	(yellow card) 95'	(substituted on) 65'
MF	7	Amjad Kalaf		(substituted on) 107'
Manager:
Radhi Shenaishil

Man of the Match:
Dhurgham Ismail (Iraq)

Assistant referees:
Matthew Cream (Australia)
Paul Cetrangolo (Australia)
Fourth official:
Chris Beath (Australia)
Fifth official:
Chow Chun Kit (Hong Kong)

=== Japan vs United Arab Emirates ===
Defending champions Japan crashed out of the tournament on penalties as Shinji Kagawa missed the decisive spot-kick as the United Arab Emirates secured a 5–4 win after a 1–1 draw between the teams at Stadium Australia. Keisuke Honda was also off target from 12 yards while Ismail Ahmed scored the winning penalty to eliminate the champions as the UAE reached the semi-finals for the first time since 1996. Mahdi Ali's team would face tournament hosts Australia in Newcastle on January 27 as they aim to reach the final for the first time on foreign soil after losing to Saudi Arabia in the final in Abu Dhabi 19 years ago.

Ali Mabkhout took his tally for the tournament to four from as many games with a well-taken effort in just the seventh minute but Gaku Shibasaki levelled nine minutes from time to take the game into extra-time after the Japanese finally secured a reward for their domination. Javier Aguirre named an unchanged side for the fourth game in a row while the United Arab Emirates were without the suspended Walid Abbas, who was ruled out after picking up a second yellow card of the tournament in the 1–0 loss against Iran in the group stages. The Emirates took the lead in the seventh minute, and soon after Mabkhout had given the Japanese a scare when the Al Jazira forward raced in only for a heavy touch to take the ball through to Eiji Kawashima. The 24-year-old, however, made no mistake with his second effort of the game as he controlled Amer Abdulrahman's ball forward before smashing a left-foot shot across Kawashima and into the far corner of the goal.

Japan had already gone close in the opening two minutes when Takashi Inui headed just wide, while Honda's snap-shot in the ninth minute was only inches away from restoring parity. The defending champions continued to dominate possession and Inui again had the chance to find the back of the net, only for another weak header from Gōtoku Sakai's in-swinging cross from the right to drop into the goalkeeper's arms. Masato Morishige's header just after the half hour mark met with a similar fate and, just two minutes before the break, Honda powered his low left-foot effort into the side netting. Japan continued their search for the equaliser into the second half. Substitute Yoshinori Muto shot across the face of goal seven minutes after the restart and, two minutes later, the FC Tokyo striker headed wide after Yasuhito Endō's centre from the right.

With Japan's front line faltering, Yuto Nagatomo tried his luck from the edge of the area, only to send his right foot shot over the bar while, on the hour mark, Kagawa's effort from the edge of the area, after a neat interchange with Honda was saved by Majed Naser. Khamis Esmaeel almost put the ball into his own net, only for Gōtoku Sakai to clear off the line and substitute Yohei Toyoda mistimed his header 15 minutes from time to steer the ball well wide. With nine minutes remaining, Japan finally equalised when Shibasaki picked up a return ball from Honda 20 yards from goal before smashing his right-foot effort low beyond Naser's outstretched right hand. Makoto Hasebe could have won it for Japan with five minutes remaining in normal time only for his shot to be blocked by Mohanad Salem's desperate lunge after Kagawa had earlier forced Naser to punch his attempt clear.

23 January 2015
20:30 AEDT (UTC+11)

Japan	1–1 (a.e.t.)	United Arab Emirates
Shibasaki 81'	Report	Mabkhout 7'
Penalties
Honda (penalty missed); Hasebe (penalty scored); Shibasaki (penalty scored); Toyoda (penalty scored); Morishige (penalty scored); Kagawa (penalty missed)	4–5	(penalty scored) O. Abdulrahman; (penalty scored) Mabkhout; (penalty missed) Esmaeel; (penalty scored) Hassan; (penalty scored) Fardan; (penalty scored) I. Ahmed

Stadium Australia, Sydney
Attendance: 19,094
Referee: Alireza Faghani (Iran)

Japan	United Arab Emirates

GK	1	Eiji Kawashima
RB	21	Gōtoku Sakai
CB	22	Maya Yoshida
CB	6	Masato Morishige
LB	5	Yuto Nagatomo
DM	17	Makoto Hasebe (c)
RM	4	Keisuke Honda
CM	7	Yasuhito Endō	(substituted off) 54'
CM	10	Shinji Kagawa
LM	18	Takashi Inui	(substituted off) 46'
CF	9	Shinji Okazaki	(substituted off) 65'
Substitutions:
MF	14	Yoshinori Muto	(substituted on) 46'
MF	20	Gaku Shibasaki	(substituted on) 54'
FW	11	Yōhei Toyoda	(substituted on) 65'
Manager:
(Mexico) Javier Aguirre

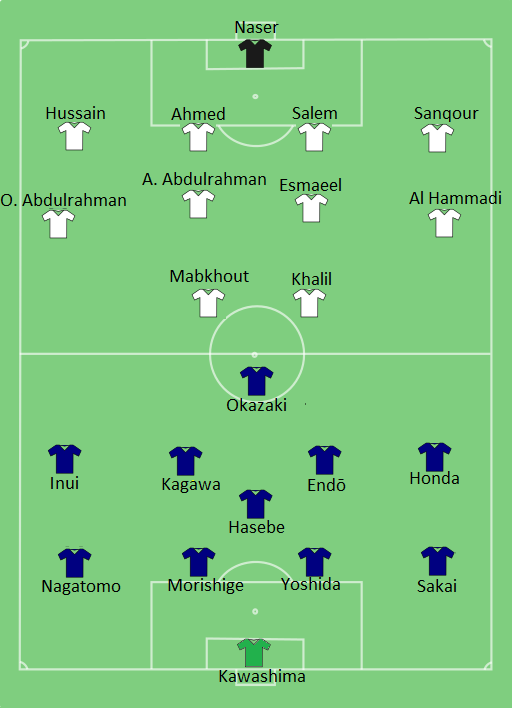

GK	1	Majed Naser (c)
RB	9	Abdulaziz Hussain		(substituted off) 76'
CB	23	Mohamed Ahmed
CB	6	Mohanad Salem
LB	14	Abdelaziz Sanqour
RM	10	Omar Abdulrahman	(yellow card) 119'
CM	5	Amer Abdulrahman		(substituted off) 54'
CM	13	Khamis Esmaeel	(yellow card) 45+2'
LM	15	Ismail Al Hammadi	(yellow card) 26'
CF	7	Ali Mabkhout
CF	11	Ahmed Khalil		(substituted off) 58'
Substitutions:
MF	17	Majed Hassan		(substituted on) 54'
MF	4	Habib Fardan		(substituted on) 58'
DF	19	Ismail Ahmed	(yellow card) 116'	(substituted on) 76'
Manager:
Mahdi Ali

Man of the Match:
Mohanad Salem (United Arab Emirates)

Assistant referees:
Reza Sokhandan (Iran)
Mohammad Reza Abolfazli (Iran)
Fourth official:
Nawaf Shukralla (Bahrain)
Fifth official:
Ebrahim Saleh (Bahrain)

== Semi-finals ==
=== South Korea vs Iraq ===
South Korea would play in the final of the AFC Asian Cup for the first time since 1988 after Uli Stielike's side handed 2007 champions Iraq a 2–0 defeat to book their place in the competition's final at Stadium Australia. The two-time champions, who have not won the continental title since 1960 would meet either hosts Australia or 21st Arabian Gulf Cup winners the United Arab Emirates on 30 January after goals from Lee Jung-hyup and Kim Young-gwon took the Taeguk Warriors past the Iraqis.

South Korea last played in the final of the AFC Asian Cup in Qatar in 1988, when they lost on penalties to Saudi Arabia, and Stielike's side avenged a semi-final defeat at the hands of Iraq when Younis Mahmoud and his teammates went on to win in 2007. Stielike made two changes to his starting line-up, bringing in Han Kyo-won for former Asian Player of the Year Lee Keun-ho as veteran right back Cha Du-ri replaced Kim Chang-soo. Iraqi, meanwhile, called up Osama Rashid for the suspended Yaser Kasim and Amjad Kalaf took the place of Columbus Crew midfielder Justin Meram.

The Koreans wasted little time taking the initiative, with Han Kyo-won narrowly missing with a diving header from Ki Sung-yueng's in-swinging free kick from the left while Nam Tae-hee tried his luck from distance, only to send the ball over the bar. Son Heung-min's 19th minute surge through the Iraqi midfield ended with the Bayer Leverkusen man seeing his drive from distance tipped over the bar by Jalal Hassan and soon after, Lee Jung-hyup claimed his second goal of the tournament.

The 23-year-old Sangju Sangmu forward rose highest to reach Kim Jin-su's free kick from close to the right touchline before Hassan could punch clear, the header sending the Korean fans amongst the 36,053 crowd into raptures in the 20th minute. South Korea had been dominant in the first half but, with six minutes remaining in the half, Iraq finally had a sight of goal. Ahmed Yasin sent his long-range attempt well over the bar while, two minutes ahead of the break, Kalaf forced Kim Jin-hyeon to drop to his right to push a low shot away for a corner. Five minutes after the restart, however, the Koreans all but put the game to bed. Lee Jung-hyup was involved again, this time chesting the ball down on the edge of the area into the path of defender Kim Young-gwon and the Guangzhou Evergrande man's bouncing left footed shot skidded past Hassan and into the corner of the goal. Ki Sung-yueng and Son Heung-min both tried their luck unsuccessfully from long range soon after, before the increasingly desperate Iraqis started pumping the ball long towards captain Mahmoud. But the veteran could not find a way past a Korean defence that has yet to concede a goal at the tournament, and the Taeguk Warriors sealed their long-awaited place in the final of the continental championship.

26 January 2015
20:00 AEDT (UTC+11)

South Korea	2–0	Iraq
Lee Jung-hyup 20'; Kim Young-gwon 50'	Report

Stadium Australia, Sydney
Attendance: 36,053
Referee: Ryuji Sato (Japan)

South Korea	Iraq

GK	23	Kim Jin-hyeon
RB	22	Cha Du-ri
CB	5	Kwak Tae-hwi
CB	19	Kim Young-gwon
LB	3	Kim Jin-su	(yellow card) 56'
CM	16	Ki Sung-yueng (c)	(yellow card) 7'	(substituted off) 90+3'
CM	6	Park Joo-ho	(yellow card) 40'
RW	12	Han Kyo-won		(substituted off) 46'
AM	10	Nam Tae-hee		(substituted off) 81'
LW	7	Son Heung-min
CF	18	Lee Jung-hyup
Substitutions:
FW	11	Lee Keun-ho		(substituted on) 46'
DF	20	Jang Hyun-soo		(substituted on) 81'
MF	14	Han Kook-young		(substituted on) 90+3'
Manager:
(Germany) Uli Stielike

GK	12	Jalal Hasan
RB	23	Waleed Salem
CB	2	Ahmad Ibrahim
CB	14	Salam Shaker
LB	15	Dhurgham Ismail
CM	21	Saad Abdul-Amir
CM	13	Osama Rashid	(substituted off) 63'
RW	7	Amjad Kalaf
AM	17	Alaa Abdul-Zahra	(substituted off) 77'
LW	9	Ahmed Yasin	(substituted off) 63'
CF	10	Younis Mahmoud (c)
Substitutions:
DF	6	Ali Adnan	(substituted on) 63'
MF	19	Mahdi Kamel	(substituted on) 63'
FW	16	Marwan Hussein	(substituted on) 77'
Manager:
Radhi Shenaishil

Man of the Match:
Nam Tae-hee (South Korea)

Assistant referees:
Toru Sagara (Japan)
Toshiyuki Nagi (Japan)
Fourth official:
Alireza Faghani (Iran)
Fifth official:
Reza Sokhandan (Iran)

=== Australia vs United Arab Emirates ===
Hosts Australia advanced to face South Korea in the final game of the tournament after maiden international goals from Trent Sainsbury and Jason Davidson in the first half at a damp Newcastle Stadium secured a 2–0 win over the United Arab Emirates. By setting up the final, this was the first time that Australia played the final on home soil.

Sainsbury handed the Socceroos the ideal start to their bid to secure a second consecutive final appearance as the centre-back headed home inside the first three minutes of the semi-final with his first goal for the Socceroos and with Davidson following suit 11 minutes later as the full-back became Australia's 10th different scorer during the tournament, Ange Postecoglou's side would face two-time winners South Korea on 31 January at Stadium Australia looking to claim a maiden continental title. Both sides made two changes following their semi-final successes, with Australia recalling defender Matthew Spiranovic and midfielder Mark Milligan, while the UAE brought in full-back Walid Abbas and forward Mohamed Abdulrahman. And it was Spiranovic's central defensive partner Sainsbury who handed Australia the ideal start inside the first three minutes as the centre-back powered a downward header from Massimo Luongo's right wing corner past Majed Naser.

Australia, though, were given a huge let off seven minutes later as Ahmed Khalil hit the foot of the post from Abdelaziz Sanqour's low cross with goalkeeper Mathew Ryan rooted to the spot but Australia took full advantage just four minutes later as the UAE defended desperately close to their own goal, but after only being able to scramble the ball out towards the edge of the penalty area, Davidson was on hand to fire a low first-time effort into the bottom corner past Naser. The UAE finally came into the contest at the end of the second half, but with Australia goalkeeper Ryan yet to be fully tested, the hosts still looked the more likely to add to their advantage.

Omar Abdulrahman was finally having more of an impact on the contest at the start of the second half and the UAE remained in the hunt for way back into the contest as Khalil flashed an effort just wide six minutes after the restart with Ryan at full stretch. Australia coach Postecoglou reacted to this by reshaping the Socceroos' midfield just before the hour mark with the introduction of Matt McKay at the expense of Milligan and Australia were able to close out the contest without any major scares with Postecoglou having the luxury of being able to withdraw both Tim Cahill and Robbie Kruse as the UAE faded over the final minutes having fallen short of a return to the final for the first time since 1996.

27 January 2015
20:00 AEDT (UTC+11)

Australia	2–0	United Arab Emirates
Sainsbury 3'; Davidson 14'	Report

Newcastle Stadium, Newcastle
Attendance: 21,079
Referee: Ravshan Irmatov (Uzbekistan)

Australia	United Arab Emirates

GK	1	Mathew Ryan
CB	20	Trent Sainsbury
CB	5	Mark Milligan		(substituted off) 59'
CB	6	Matthew Spiranovic
RWB	2	Ivan Franjić
LWB	3	Jason Davidson
DM	15	Mile Jedinak (c)	(yellow card) 64'
RM	10	Robbie Kruse		(substituted off) 82'
CM	21	Massimo Luongo
LM	7	Mathew Leckie	(yellow card) 42'
CF	4	Tim Cahill		(substituted off) 67'
Substitutions:
MF	17	Matt McKay		(substituted on) 59'
FW	9	Tomi Jurić		(substituted on) 67'
MF	14	James Troisi		(substituted on) 82'
Manager:
Ange Postecoglou

GK	1	Majed Naser (c)
RB	14	Abdelaziz Sanqour
CB	23	Mohamed Ahmed
CB	6	Mohanad Salem
LB	3	Walid Abbas	(substituted off) 78'
CM	13	Khamis Esmaeel
CM	5	Amer Abdulrahman
RW	10	Omar Abdulrahman
AM	16	Mohamed Abdulrahman	(substituted off) 46'
LW	7	Ali Mabkhout
CF	11	Ahmed Khalil	(substituted off) 66'
Substitutions:
MF	15	Ismail Al Hammadi	(substituted on) 46'
FW	20	Saeed Al-Kathiri	(substituted on) 66'
MF	21	Haboush Saleh	(substituted on) 78'
Manager:
Mahdi Ali

Man of the Match:
Massimo Luongo (Australia)

Assistant referees:
Abdukhamidullo Rasulov (Uzbekistan)
Bakhadyr Kochkarov (Kyrgyzstan)
Fourth official:
Abdulrahman Abdou (Qatar)
Fifth official:
Ramzan Al-Naemi (Qatar)

== Third place match ==
Tournament top scorer Ali Mabkhout netted a second-half penalty as the United Arab Emirates claimed third place at the tournament after edging out former champions Iraq 3–2 in a thrilling contest at the Newcastle Stadium. UAE captain Ahmed Khalil opened the scoring for the UAE after 16 minutes only for Waleed Salim and Amjad Kalaf to turn the contest in favour of 2007 champions Iraq before half-time but after Khalil levelled the entertaining contest at the start of the second half with his fourth of the campaign, Mabkhout coolly netted his fifth just before the hour mark after Iraq's Ahmed Ibrahim had been sent-off to hand the 1996 finalists their second-best finish at the AFC Asian Cup.

With both coaches retaining the majority of their first team and only making minor changes to their starting line-ups following their semi-final defeats earlier in the week, it was the UAE's exciting front three which helped Mahdi Ali's side open the scoring as Mabkhout freed Omar Abdulrahman following a swift counterattack and Khalil was on hand to produce a first-time finish inside the penalty area from the perfectly weighted through ball. Iraq, though, were almost back on level terms just four minutes later as Younis Mahmoud's follow-up was acrobatically tipped over the crossbar by substitute UAE goalkeeper Khalid Eisa after Majed Hassan's attempted sliding clearance on the edge of the penalty area had bounced back off the woodwork following a deflection off the veteran striker.

But Eisa was given no chance after 28 minutes as Salim was found inside the area by Kalaf and the full-back's strike crucially deflected off Khamis Esmaeel to beat the UAE goalkeeper high at his near post and Eisa was again beaten three minutes before half-time as the UAE custodian could only parry a low rasping drive from Ahmed Yasin from just outside the area and Kalaf was first to react to volley home from 10 yards. Iraq maintained their pressure at the start of the second half and came close to extending their advantage less than a minute after the restart as Mahmoud scuffed wide from inside the area with only Eisa to beat from Yaser Kasim's pass.

The miss, though, proved costly for Iraq as just six minutes later Khalil beat the offside trap from Abdulrahman's superb chipped ball forward and after taking one touch to evade on-rushing goalkeeper Mohammed Hamed, the striker rolled the ball into the empty net. Three minutes before the hour mark, the UAE completed their comeback as Ibrahim was sent off after hauling down Mabkhout inside the area following a mistake by goalkeeper Hamed and the striker picked himself up to coolly beat the Iraq custodian from the resulting penalty to move one goal clear of Jordan's Hamza Al-Dardour and teammate Khalil at the top of the goalscoring chart.

The UAE came close to extending their lead with 15 minutes remaining as substitute Walid Abbas headed against the foot of the back post from Abdulrahman's deep corner and despite Iraq pressing forward in the closing stages, the UAE held on to claim third place at the AFC Asian Cup for the first time, having lost to China PR on penalties in the same stage in 1992. The United Arab Emirates also effectively became the last team to claim the third place position at the tournament, when this stage was officially abolished before the eventual tournament held in the country.

30 January 2015
20:00 AEDT (UTC+11)

Iraq	2–3	United Arab Emirates
Salem 28'; Kalaf 42'	Report	Khalil 16', 51'; Mabkhout 57' (pen.)

Newcastle Stadium, Newcastle
Attendance: 12,829
Referee: Nawaf Shukralla (Bahrain)

Iraq	United Arab Emirates

GK	20	Mohammed Hameed
RB	23	Waleed Salem	(yellow card) 90+4'
CB	2	Ahmad Ibrahim	(red card) 55'
CB	14	Salam Shaker
LB	15	Dhurgham Ismail	(yellow card) 37'
CM	21	Saad Abdul-Amir
CM	5	Yaser Kasim
RW	7	Amjad Kalaf		(substituted off) 86'
AM	19	Mahdi Kamel		(substituted off) 62'
LW	9	Ahmed Yasin		(substituted off) 80'
CF	10	Younis Mahmoud (c)
Substitutions:
DF	3	Ali Bahjat		(substituted on) 62'
DF	6	Ali Adnan		(substituted on) 80'
FW	8	Justin Meram		(substituted on) 86'
Manager:
Radhi Shenaishil

GK	12	Khalid Eisa
RB	9	Abdulaziz Hussain	(yellow card) 79'
CB	23	Mohamed Ahmed
CB	6	Mohanad Salem
LB	14	Abdelaziz Sanqour		(substituted off) 68'
RM	17	Majed Hassan
CM	13	Khamis Esmaeel
LM	4	Habib Fardan		(substituted off) 54'
RF	10	Omar Abdulrahman	(yellow card) 41'
CF	11	Ahmed Khalil (c)		(substituted off) 76'
LF	7	Ali Mabkhout
Substitutions:
MF	15	Ismail Al Hammadi		(substituted on) 54'
DF	3	Walid Abbas		(substituted on) 68'
MF	5	Amer Abdulrahman		(substituted on) 76'
Manager:
Mahdi Ali

Man of the Match:
Ahmed Khalil (United Arab Emirates)

Assistant referees:
Yaser Tulefat (Bahrain)
Ebrahim Saleh (Bahrain)
Fourth official:
Ben Williams (Australia)
Fifth official:
Matthew Cream (Australia)

== Final ==
31 January 2015
20:00 AEDT (UTC+11)

South Korea	1–2 (a.e.t.)	Australia
Son Heung-min 90+1'	Report	Luongo 45'; Troisi 105'

Stadium Australia, Sydney
Attendance: 76,385
Referee: Alireza Faghani (Iran)

South Korea	Australia

GK	23	Kim Jin-hyeon
CB	5	Kwak Tae-hwi
CB	20	Jang Hyun-soo
CB	19	Kim Young-gwon
RM	22	Cha Du-ri
CM	16	Ki Sung-yueng (c)
CM	6	Park Joo-ho	(substituted off) 71'
LM	3	Kim Jin-su
RF	10	Nam Tae-hee	(substituted off) 63'
CF	18	Lee Jung-hyup	(substituted off) 87'
LF	7	Son Heung-min
Substitutes:
FW	11	Lee Keun-ho	(substituted on) 63'
MF	14	Han Kook-young	(substituted on) 71'
DF	4	Kim Ju-young	(substituted on) 87'
Manager:
(Germany) Uli Stielike

GK	1	Mathew Ryan
CB	20	Trent Sainsbury
CB	5	Mark Milligan
CB	6	Matthew Spiranovic	(yellow card) 59'
RWB	2	Ivan Franjić	(yellow card) 6'	(substituted off) 74'
LWB	3	Jason Davidson	(yellow card) 41'
DM	15	Mile Jedinak (c)	(yellow card) 66'
RM	10	Robbie Kruse	(yellow card) 68'	(substituted off) 71'
CM	21	Massimo Luongo
LM	7	Mathew Leckie
CF	4	Tim Cahill		(substituted off) 63'
Substitutes:
FW	9	Tomi Jurić		(substituted on) 63'
MF	14	James Troisi		(substituted on) 71'
MF	17	Matt McKay		(substituted on) 74'
Manager:
Ange Postecoglou

Man of the Match:
Trent Sainsbury (Australia)

Assistant referees:
Reza Sokhandan (Iran)
Mohammad Reza Abolfazli (Iran)
Fourth official:
Fahad Al-Mirdasi (Saudi Arabia)
Fifth official:
Abdulla Al-Shalawi (Saudi Arabia)
