= Marjan Eid =

Bahraini footballer and manager

Personal information
- Full name: Marjan Eid
- Date of birth: 12 May 1979 (age 47)
- Place of birth: Riffa, Bahrain
- Position: Defender

Youth career
- 1995–1997: Al-Riffa

Senior career*
Years	Team	Apps	(Gls)
1997–2006	Al-Riffa		

International career
2000–2005	Bahrain	11	

Managerial career
- 2007–2010: Bahrain (assistant)
- 2010: Bahrain (caretaker)
- 2013–2014: Bahrain (assistant)
- 2014–2015: Bahrain
- * Club domestic league appearances and goals

Marjan Eid (born 12 May 1979) is a Bahraini football manager who most recently managed the Bahrain national football team.

== Bahrain results ==
#	Date	Venue	Opponent	Result	Goalscorers	Competition
2014
1	November 2, 2014	Riffa, Bahrain	North Korea	2-2		Friendly
2	November 7, 2014	Riffa, Bahrain	Singapore	2–0		22nd Arabian Gulf Cup
3	November 13, 2014	Riyadh, Saudi Arabia	Yemen	0-0		22nd Arabian Gulf Cup
4	November 16, 2014	Riyadh, Saudi Arabia	Saudi Arabia	0–3		22nd Arabian Gulf Cup
5	November 19, 2014	Riyadh, Saudi Arabia	Qatar	0–0		22nd Arabian Gulf Cup
6	December 30, 2014	Geelong, Australia	Saudi Arabia	4–1		Friendly
2015
7	January 4, 2015	Ballarat, Australia	Jordan	1–0	Faouzi Aaish	Friendly
8	January 11, 2015	Brisbane, Australia	Iran	0–2		2015 AFC Asian Cup
9	January 15, 2015	Melbourne, Australia	United Arab Emirates	1-2	Jaycee John Okwunwanne	2015 AFC Asian Cup
10	January 19, 2015	Melbourne, Australia	Qatar	2-1	Sayed Saeed, Sayed Jaafar Ahmed	2015 AFC Asian Cup
