= Abdukhamidullo Rasulov =

Uzbekistani football referee (born 1976)

- Full name: Abduxamidullo Rasulov
- Born: January 10, 1976 (age 50); Tashkent, Uzbek SSR, Soviet Union

Domestic
Years	League	Role
2005–	Uzbek League	Referee

International
Years	League	Role
2005–	FIFA listed	Referee

Abdukhamidullo Rasulov (Russian: Абдухамидулло Расулов; born January 10, 1976), is an Uzbek professional football assistant referee. He has been an assistant referee on international level since 2005. At the FIFA World Cup 2014 he was an assistant referee of Ravshan Irmatov.

In November 2012, he was selected by the AFC as best assistant referee at the AFC Annual Awards.

== Tournaments ==
Rasulov was assistant referee at the following tournaments:

- AFC Asian Cup 2011
- FIFA Confederations Cup 2013
- FIFA World Cup 2014
- AFC Asian Cup 2015
- FIFA World Cup 2018

== Matches ==
- Australia–Kuwait (Group A)
- Qatar–Iran (Group C)
- Japan–Jordan (Group D)
- Australia–United Arab Emirates (Semi-final)
