= Ahmed Abdul Maqsoud =

Qatari footballer (born 1990)

Personal information
- Full name: Ahmed Mohammed Abdul Maqsoud
- Date of birth: 23 March 1990 (age 36)
- Place of birth: Alexandria, Egypt
- Position: Midfielder

Team information
- Current team: Umm Salal
- Number: 32

Senior career*
Years	Team	Apps	(Gls)
2010–2012	Al Sadd SC		
2011–2012	→ Al-Ahli (loan)	14	(1)
2012–2017	Lekhwiya	27	(0)
2013–2015	→ Umm-Salal (loan)	45	(1)
2016–2017	→ Al Arabi (loan)	10	(0)
2017	→ Al-Ahli (loan)	7	(0)
2017–2023	Al-Rayyan	81	(0)
2023–2024	Al-Wakrah	16	(0)
2024–2025	Al-Duhail	12	(0)
2025–	Umm Salal	11	(0)

International career^{‡}
2014–	Qatar	33	(2)
- * Club domestic league appearances and goals as of 17 January 2026 ‡ National team caps and goals as of 00:03, 27 January 2017 (UTC)

Ahmed Abdul Maqsoud (Arabic: أحمد عبد المقصود; born 23 March 1990) is a professional footballer who plays as a midfielder for Qatar Stars League club Umm Salal. Born in Egypt, he has played for the Qatar national football team.

== International career ==
=== International goals ===
Scores and results list Qatar's goal tally first.

Goal	Date	Venue	Opponent	Score	Result	Competition
1.	9 October 2014	Abdullah bin Khalifa Stadium, Doha, Qatar	Lebanon	3–0	5–0	Friendly
2.	11 June 2015	Galolhu Rasmee Dhandu Stadium, Malé, Maldives	Maldives	1–0	1–0	2018 FIFA World Cup qualification

== Honours ==
Lekhwiya SC

Winner

- Qatar Crown Prince Cup: 2013

Runner-up

- Qatar Stars League: 2012–13
