= Mohamed Husain =

Bahraini footballer

Personal information
- Full name: Mohamed Husain Bahzad
- Date of birth: 31 July 1980 (age 46)
- Place of birth: Manama, Bahrain
- Height: 1.81 m (5 ft 11 in)
- Position: Centre-back

Youth career
- 1998–2001: Al-Gharafa

Senior career*
Years	Team	Apps	(Gls)
2000–2001	Al-Gharafa	8	(0)
2001–2003	Al-Ahli Jeddah	22	(1)
2003–2006	Al-Ahli Manama	40	(4)
2004–2005	→ Al-Kharaitiyat (loan)	22	(2)
2006–2007	Al-Kazma	14	(1)
2007–2008	Al-Qadisiyah	52	(1)
2008–2009	Al-Salmiya	11	(1)
2009–2012	Umm Salal	73	(1)
2012–2013	Al-Riffa	5	(0)
2013–2016	Al-Nassr	37	(3)
2016–2018	Al-Riffa	2	(0)
Total		286	(14)

International career
1997	Bahrain U17	3	(0)
2000–2015	Bahrain	161	(10)
- * Club domestic league appearances and goals

Mohamed Husain Bahzad (Arabic: مُحَمَّد حُسَيْن بَهْزَاد; born 31 July 1980) is a Bahraini former professional footballer who played as a centre-back.

== International career ==
He has been called up to the Bahrain national football team, and appeared at the 1997 FIFA U-17 World Championship in Egypt.

== Career statistics ==
Scores and results list Bahrain's goal tally first, score column indicates score after each Husain goal.

List of international goals scored by Mohamed Husain
No.	Date	Venue	Opponent	Score	Result	Competition
1	21 February 2001	Kuwait City, Kuwait	Kyrgyzstan		2–1	2002 FIFA World Cup qualification
2	27 February 2001	Kuwait City, Kuwait	Kuwait		1–0	2002 FIFA World Cup qualification
3	21 October 2001	Manama, Bahrain	Iran		3–1	2002 FIFA World Cup qualification
4	12 December 2002	Manama, Bahrain	China		2–2	International tournament
5	17 November 2004	Manama, Bahrain	Tajikistan		4–0	2006 FIFA World Cup qualification
6	21 March 2008	Manama, Bahrain	Iran		1–0	Friendly
7	26 August 2009	Manama, Bahrain	Kenya		2–1	International tournament
8	26 August 2009	Manama, Bahrain	Kenya		2–1	International tournament
9	8 November 2011	Muharraq, Bahrain	Jordan		3–0	Friendly
10	29 November 2012	Al Wakrah, Qatar	Palestine		2–0	Friendly

== Honours ==
Al Nassr

- Saudi Professional League: 2013–14, 2014–15
- Saudi Crown Prince Cup: 2013–14

== See also ==
- List of men's footballers with 100 or more international caps
