= Rashed Al-Hooti =

Bahraini footballer

Rashed Al Hooti
Personal information
- Date of birth: 24 December 1989 (age 36)
- Place of birth: Manama, Bahrain
- Height: 1.70 m (5 ft 7 in)
- Position: Left back

Team information
- Current team: Al-Riffa
- Number: 13

Senior career*
Years	Team	Apps	(Gls)
2008–2014	East Riffa	90	(2)
2014–	Al-Riffa	3	(0)

International career
2009–	Bahrain	19	(0)
- * Club domestic league appearances and goals

Rashed Al Hooti (born 24 December 1989) is a Bahraini footballer who plays as a defender. He was called up to the Bahrain squad at the 2011 and 2015 AFC Asian Cups. He is the current holder of the title of fastest red card in international match history. On 11 October 2011 against Iran in a 2014 World Cup qualifier match he was carded in 39 seconds.
