= Mohamed Duaij Mahorfi =

Bahraini footballer

Mohamed Duaij
Personal information
- Full name: Mohamed Duaij Mohamed Saleh Ali
- Date of birth: 24 July 1981 (age 45)
- Place of birth: Manama, Bahrain
- Height: 1.78 m (5 ft 10 in)
- Position: Defender

Youth career
- Al-Riffa

Senior career*
Years	Team	Apps	(Gls)
2006–2015	Al-Riffa		

International career
2011–2018	Bahrain	35	(1)
- * Club domestic league appearances and goals as of 12 June 2018

Mohamed Duaij (born 24 July 1981) is a Bahraini professional footballer who plays as a defender for Al-Riffa.

== Career statistics ==
=== International ===
Appearances and goals by national team and year
National team	Year	Apps	Goals
Bahrain	2011	3	0
Bahrain	2012	9	0
Bahrain	2013	6	1
Bahrain	2014	11	0
Bahrain	2015	2	0
Bahrain	2016	2	0
Bahrain	2017	–	
Bahrain	2018	2	0
Total		35	1

Scores and results list Bahrain's goal tally first, score column indicates score after each Mahorfi goal.

List of international goals scored by Mohamed Duaij Mahorfi
No.	Date	Venue	Opponent	Score	Result	Competition
1	1 February 2013	Bahrain National Stadium, Riffa, Bahrain	Singapore	3–1	3–1	Friendly
