= Sayed Mohammed Jaffer =

Bahraini footballer

Personal information
- Full name: Sayed Mohammed Jaffer Sabt Abbas
- Date of birth: 25 August 1985 (age 41)
- Place of birth: Bahrain
- Height: 1.80 m (5 ft 11 in)
- Position: Goalkeeper

Team information
- Current team: Muharraq
- Number: 21

Youth career
- 2002–2004: Malkiya

Senior career*
Years	Team	Apps	(Gls)
2003–2007	Malkiya		(0)
2007–	Muharraq		(0)

International career
2004–2024	Bahrain	163	(0)
Medal record
Men's football
Representing Bahrain
Arabian Gulf Cup
Winner	2024 Kuwait
Winner	2019 Qatar
- * Club domestic league appearances and goals as of 14 May 2024 (UTC)

Sayed Mohammed Jaffer Sabt Abbas (Arabic: سيد محمد جعفر سبت عباس; born 25 August 1985) is a Bahraini footballer who plays as a goalkeeper for Muharraq and the Bahrain national team.

He is the most-capped player in Bahraini history and captained his national team to their first-ever titles in the Arabian Gulf Cup and WAFF Championship in 2019.

== Career statistics ==
National team	Years	Apps	Goals
Bahrain	2004	5	0
Bahrain	2005	4	0
Bahrain	2006	2	0
Bahrain	2007	3	0
Bahrain	2008	20	0
Bahrain	2009	18	0
Bahrain	2010	9	0
Bahrain	2011	11	0
Bahrain	2012	10	0
Bahrain	2013	14	0
Bahrain	2014	12	0
Bahrain	2015	10	0
Bahrain	2016	3	0
Bahrain	2017	4	0
Bahrain	2018	0	0
Bahrain	2019	10	0
Bahrain	2020	1	0
Bahrain	2021	10	0
Bahrain	2022	10	0
Bahrain	2023	5	0
Bahrain	2024	2	0
Total		163	0

== Honours ==
- Bahraini Premier League (6): 2007–08, 2008–09, 2010–11, 2014–15, 2017–18, 2024–25
- King's Cup (Bahrain) (7): 2008, 2009, 2011, 2012, 2013, 2015–16, 2019–20
- Bahraini FA Cup: 2009, 2020, 2021, 2022
- Bahraini Crown Prince Cup: 2008, 2009
- Bahraini Super Cup: 2013, 2018
- Bahrain Elite Cup: 2019
- AFC Cup: 2008, 2021
- Gulf Club Champions Cup: 2012

Individual

- WAFF Championship Best Goalkeeper: 2014

== See also ==
- List of men's footballers with 100 or more international caps
