= Faouzi Aaish =

Moroccan-born Bahraini footballer

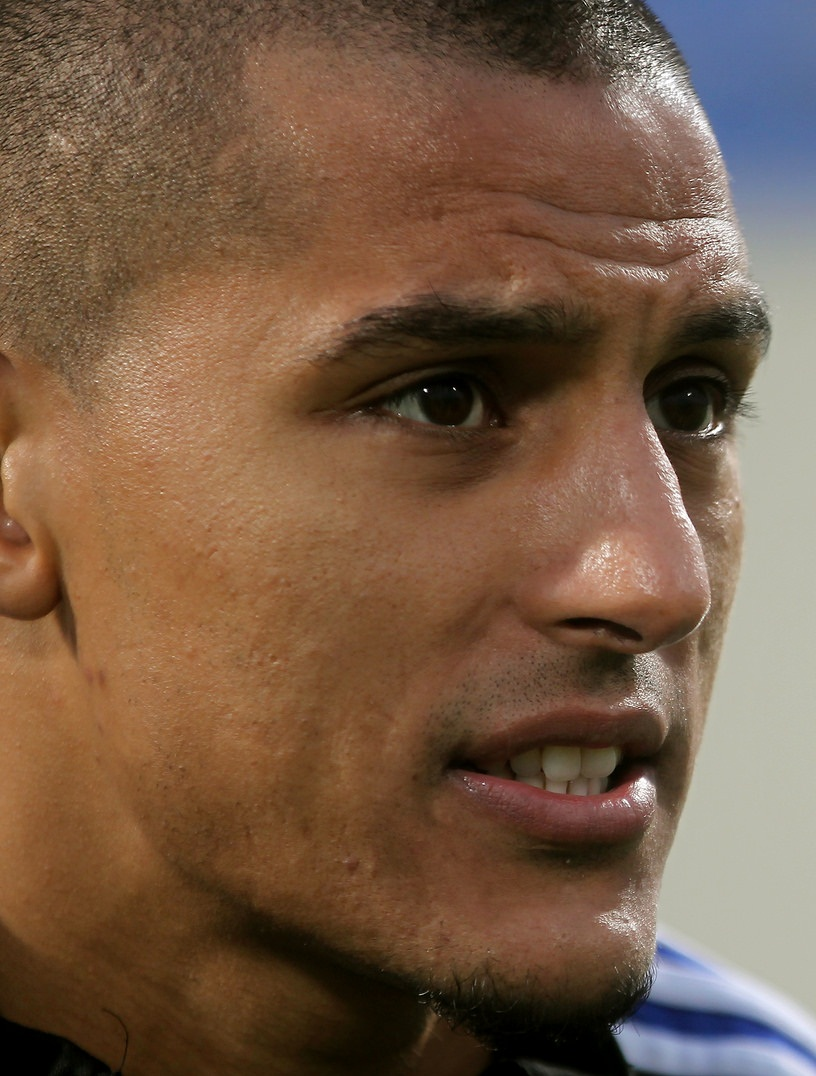

Personal information
- Full name: Faouzi Mubarak Aaish
- Date of birth: 27 February 1985 (age 41)
- Place of birth: Casablanca, Morocco
- Height: 1.80 m (5 ft 11 in)
- Position: Midfielder

Senior career*
Years	Team	Apps	(Gls)
2003–2010	Muharraq	126	(9)
2010–2011	Al-Sailiya	34	(4)
2011–2012	Dubai Club	1	(0)
2012–2013	Muharraq	1	(0)
2013–2017	Al-Sailiya	48	(20)
2017	Umm Salal		
2017–2019	Riffa SC		
2019-2020	Al-Hala SC		

International career^{‡}
2004–2016	Bahrain	104	(20)
- * Club domestic league appearances and goals as of 9 July 2015 ‡ National team caps and goals as of 29 December 2016

Faouzi Mubarak Aaish (Arabic: فوزي مبارك عايش; born 27 February 1985) is a retired Bahraini professional football player of Moroccan origin. He last played for Al-Hala SC and is a former Bahrain national football team international player.

== International career ==
Born in Morocco, Aaish represented Bahrain in international competition and made 103 appearances for the Bahrain national football team, including 14 qualifying matches for the 2006 and 2010 FIFA World Cup. He scored the game-winning goal against Qatar to keep Bahrain's hopes of qualifying alive on 2 April 2009. Faouzi scored a penalty against Qatar which ended to 1–0 win, and Bahrain made it out of the group stage into the semi-finals of the GCC cup.

=== International goals ===
Scores and results list Bahrain's goal tally first.

No.	Date	Venue	Opponent	Score	Result	Competition
1.	30 January 2006	Bahrain National Stadium, Riffa, Bahrain	Syria	1–1	1–1	Friendly
2.	14 June 2008	Bahrain National Stadium, Riffa, Bahrain	Oman	1–0	1–1	2010 FIFA World Cup qualification
3.	4 February 2009	Maktoum Bin Rashid Al Maktoum Stadium, Dubai, United Arab Emirates	South Korea	1–0	2–2	Friendly
4.	23 March 2009	Bahrain National Stadium, Riffa, Bahrain	Zimbabwe	2–0	5–2	Friendly
5.	1 April 2009	Bahrain National Stadium, Riffa, Bahrain	Qatar	1–0	1–0	2010 FIFA World Cup qualification (Note: Different qualifying round to goal no. 1)
6.	8 October 2010	Jaber Al-Ahmad International Stadium, Kuwait City, Kuwait	Kuwait	2–0	3–1	Friendly
7.	12 October 2010	Bahrain National Stadium, Riffa, Bahrain	Uzbekistan	1–2	2–4	Friendly
8.	26 November 2010	May 22 Stadium, Aden, Yemen	Iraq	1–1	2–3	20th Arabian Gulf Cup
9.	28 December 2010	Maktoum Bin Rashid Al Maktoum Stadium, Dubai, United Arab Emirates	Jordan	1–0	2–1	Friendly
10.	10 January 2011	Thani bin Jassim Stadium, Doha, Qatar	South Korea	1–2	1–2	2011 AFC Asian Cup
11.	14 January 2011	Jassim Bin Hamad Stadium, Doha, Qatar	India	1–0	5–2	2011 AFC Asian Cup
12.	8 November 2012	Bahrain National Stadium, Riffa, Bahrain	Jordan	2–0	3–0	Friendly
13.	11 January 2013	Bahrain National Stadium, Riffa, Bahrain	Qatar	1–0	1–0	21st Arabian Gulf Cup
14.	6 February 2013	Sharjah Stadium, Sharjah, United Arab Emirates	Yemen	1–0	2–0	2015 AFC Asian Cup qualification
15.	22 March 2013	Bahrain National Stadium, Riffa, Bahrain	Qatar	1–0	1–0	2015 AFC Asian Cup qualification
16.	19 November 2013	Bahrain National Stadium, Riffa, Bahrain	Yemen	2–0	2–0	2015 AFC Asian Cup qualification
17.	9 September 2014	Ali Sabah Al-Salem Stadium, Al Farwaniyah, Kuwait	Kuwait	1–0	1–0	Friendly
18.	30 December 2014	Melbourne Cricket Ground, Melbourne, Australia	Saudi Arabia	1–0	4–1	Friendly
19.	4 January 2015	Morshead Park Stadium, Ballarat, Australia	Jordan	1–0	1–0	Friendly
20.	30 March 2015	Bahrain National Stadium, Riffa, Bahrain	Philippines	1–0	2–1	Friendly

== See also ==
- List of men's footballers with 100 or more international caps
