= Sayed Jaafar Ahmed =

Bahraini footballer

Personal information
- Full name: Sayed Ahmed Jaafar Ahmed
- Date of birth: 4 March 1991 (age 35)
- Place of birth: Bahrain
- Position: Midfielder

Team information
- Current team: Riffa S.C.
- Number: 8

Senior career*
Years	Team	Apps	(Gls)
2014–	Riffa S.C.		(2)

International career^{‡}
2012–	Bahrain	15	(1)
- * Club domestic league appearances and goals as of 20:52, 19 January 2015 (UTC) ‡ National team caps and goals as of 20:53, 19 January 2015 (UTC)

Sayed Jaafar Ahmed (born 4 March 1991) is a Bahraini professional footballer who plays as a midfielder for Riffa S.C.

== International ==
=== International goals ===
Scores and results list Bahrain's goal tally first.

Goal	Date	Venue	Opponent	Score	Result	Competition
1.	19 January 2015	Stadium Australia, Sydney, Australia	Qatar	2–1	2–1	2015 AFC Asian Cup
