= Majed Naser =

Emirati footballer (born 1984)

Personal information
- Full name: Majed Naser Humaid Bakheit
- Date of birth: 1 April 1984 (age 42)
- Place of birth: Fujairah, United Arab Emirates
- Height: 1.80 m (5 ft 11 in)
- Position: Goalkeeper

Team information
- Current team: Al-Hamriyah
- Number: 55

Youth career
- 2000–2003: Fujairah

Senior career*
Years	Team	Apps	(Gls)
2004–2005	Fujairah	2	(0)
2005–2012	Al Wasl	120	(0)
2012–2025	Shabab Al-Ahli	185	(0)
2025–	Al-Hamriyah	0	(0)

International career
2006–2018	United Arab Emirates	78	(0)
- * Club domestic league appearances and goals as of 23 September 2023

Majed Naser Humaid Bakheit (Arabic: ماجد ناصر حميد بخيت; born 1 April 1984) is an Emirati footballer who plays as a goalkeeper for Al-Hamriyah. He was called to United Arab Emirates national football team at 2007 and 2011 and 2015 AFC Asian Cups.

== Early life ==
Majed Naser was born in Fujairah, UAE.

== Controversies ==
He has a reputation of being short-tempered which caused him to have a history of on-pitch assault that often exposes him to lengthy suspensions. Among them: In 2001, while playing for the youth team of Fujairah SC, he was sentenced to a one-year suspension and a fine of 6,000 dirhams for verbally and physically assaulting the referee, and throwing a rock at the assistant referee during his team's Cup Match against Al Shabab Club. In 2007, In the season's first League Match against Al Jazira Club, Majed assaulted the assistant referee, Saeed Al Hoti. He was then sentenced to a 13-match ban and a 10,000 dirhams fine. It was reduced later by the Appeal Committee to 5 matches only. In 2011, a single match ban and 1,000 dirhams fine were imposed on Majed Naser for throwing one of the chairs scattered around the pitch during a League match against Al Wahda FC. In 2012, Majed received a 17-match ban and was fined 30,000 dirhams after slapping Ahli Dubai's coach Quique Flores after the semi-final of the Etisalat Cup. Majed announced his retirement of football following the ban sentence, but has changed his mind later. In 2012, Majed had been suspended by his club for the entire 2012–13 season following a red card for butting an opponent in a defeat by Al Muharraq SC.
