= Abdulwahab Al-Malood =

Bahraini footballer

Personal information
- Full name: Abdulwahab Abdelrahman Hedaib Isa Ali Al-Malood
- Date of birth: 7 June 1990 (age 36)
- Place of birth: Muharraq, Bahrain
- Height: 1.71 m (5 ft 7 in)
- Position: Midfielder

Team information
- Current team: Al-Muharraq
- Number: 11

Senior career*
Years	Team	Apps	(Gls)
2006–2014	Al-Muharraq	89	(1)
2014–2020	Al-Hidd	7	(0)
2020–	Al-Muharraq		

International career
2010–2025	Bahrain	86	(5)
Medal record
Men's football
Representing Bahrain
Gulf Cup
Winner	2024 Kuwait
- * Club domestic league appearances and goals

Abdulwahab Abdelrahman Hedaib Isa Ali Al-Malood (Arabic: عبد الوهاب المالود; born 7 June 1990 in Muharraq, Bahrain) is a Bahraini footballer who plays for Al-Hidd in the Bahraini Premier League as a midfielder. He is a member of the Bahrain national team. He appeared for the national team at 2011 and 2015 AFC Asian Cups.

== International career ==
=== International goals ===
Scores and results list Bahrain's goal tally first.

Goal	Date	Venue	Opponent	Score	Result	Competition
1.	8 January 2013	Bahrain National Stadium, Riffa, Bahrain	United Arab Emirates	1–1	1–2	21st Arabian Gulf Cup
2.	9 September 2013	Al-Sadaqua Walsalam Stadium, Kuwait City, Kuwait	Kuwait	1–0	1–2	Friendly
3.	11 June 2015	Philippine Sports Stadium, Bocaue, Philippines	Philippines	1–2	1–2	2018 FIFA World Cup qualification
4.	24 March 2016	Bahrain National Stadium, Riffa, Bahrain	Yemen	2–0	3–0	2018 FIFA World Cup qualification
5.	9 October 2019	Bahrain National Stadium, Riffa, Bahrain	Azerbaijan	1–0	2–3	Friendly

== Honours ==
Al Muharraq

- AFC Cup: 2021

Individual

- AFC Cup Most Valuable Player: 2021
