= Qasem Burhan =

Qatari footballer (born 1985)

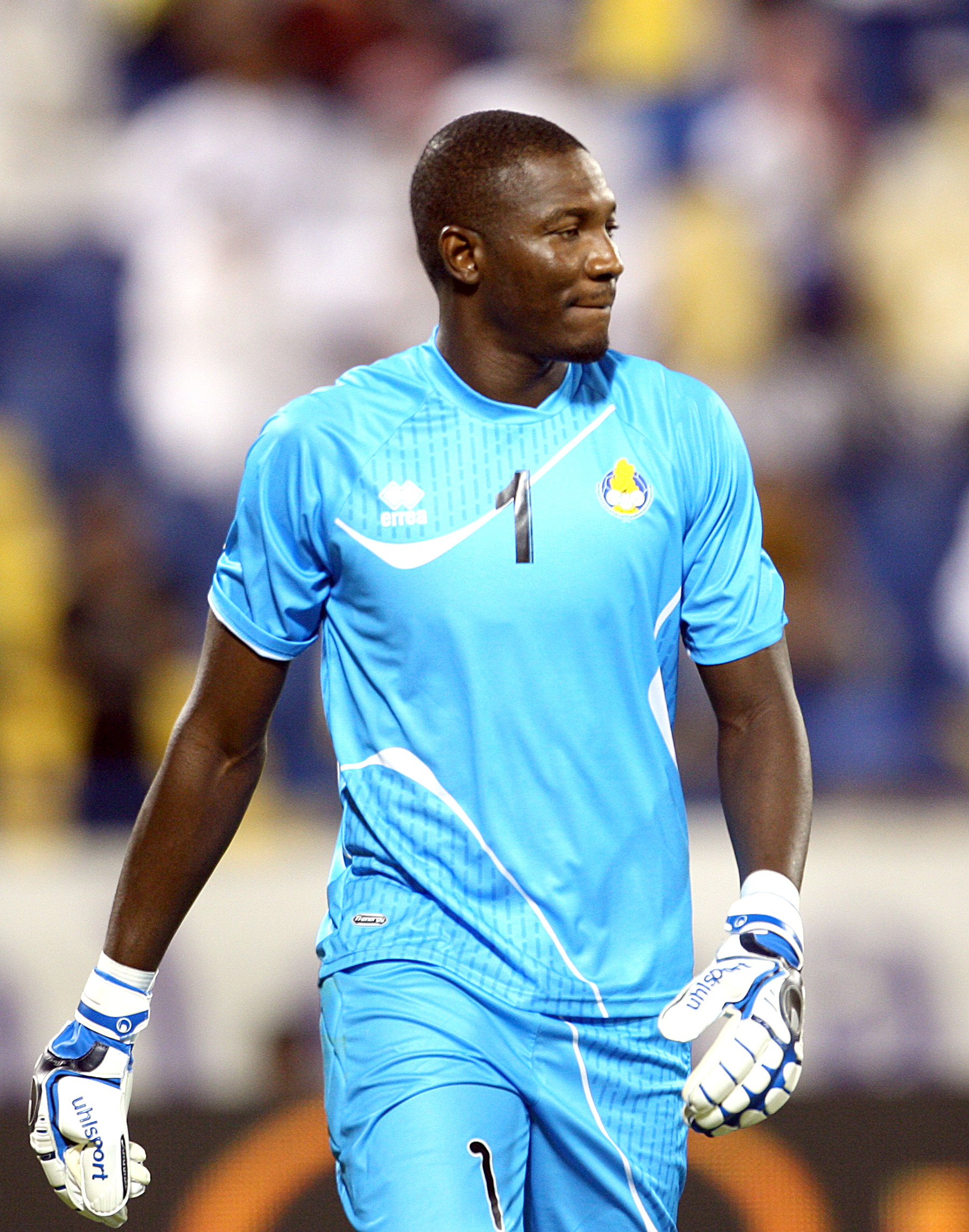

Personal information
- Full name: Qasem Abdulhamed Burhan
- Date of birth: December 15, 1985 (age 40)
- Place of birth: Dakar, Senegal
- Height: 1.92 m (6 ft 4 in)
- Position: Goalkeeper

Youth career
- 2000–2003: Al Khor

Senior career*
Years	Team	Apps	(Gls)
2003–2005	Al Khor	26	(0)
2005–2008	Al Rayyan	64	(0)
2008–2023	Al Gharrafa	193	(0)
2016–2017	→ Lekhwiya (loan)	6	(0)
Total		289	(0)

International career^{‡}
2002–2006	Qatar U23	13	(0)
2004–2015	Qatar	80	(0)
- * Club domestic league appearances and goals ‡ National team caps and goals as of 30 March 2023

Qasem Abdulhamed Burhan (Arabic: قَاسِم عَبْد الْحَمِيد بُرْهَان; born on December 15, 1985) is a former footballer. Born in Senegal, he represented the Qatar national team.

== International ==
Burhan is born and raised in Senegal, but early in his career moved to Qatar, where he became a naturalized citizen. He is a member of the Qatar national football team. He was given his international debut against Bahrain in the 2004 by caretaker coach Saeed Al-Misnad. He was Qatar's first choice goalkeeper in the 2011 Asian Cup.

He won Goalkeeper of the tournament in the 22nd Arabian Gulf Cup held in Saudi Arabia, having succeeded in winning the title over Oman's Ali Al-Habsi, who had consecutively won the last four Goalkeeper of the tournament titles. He was selected in Qatar's 2015 Asian Cup squad despite having a torrid record with Al Gharafa in the league during the 2014–15 season.

== Honors ==
=== Club ===
Al Khor

- Qatar Crown Prince Cup: 2005

Al Rayyan

- Emir of Qatar Cup: 2004, 2006

Al Gharafa

- Qatar Stars League: 2008, 2009, 2010
- Emir of Qatar Cup: 2009, 2012
- Qatar Crown Prince Cup: 2010, 2011
- Qatari Stars Cup: 2018, 2019

Lekhwiya

- Qatar Stars League: 2017

=== International ===
Qatar

- 22nd Arabian Gulf Cup: 2014

== Club career statistics ==
Statistics accurate as of 22 April 2023

Club	Season	League	League		Cup^{1}		League Cup^{2}		AFC Champions League^{3}		Total	
Club	Season	League	Apps	Goals	Apps	Goals	Apps	Goals	Apps	Goals	Apps	Goals
Al-Khor	2003–04	QSL	2	0	1	0			0	0	3	0
Al-Khor	2004–05	QSL	24	0	1	0			0	0	25	0
Al-Khor	Total		26	0	2	0			0	0	28	0
Al-Rayyan	2005–06	QSL	26	0	3	0			0	0	29	0
Al-Rayyan	2006–07	QSL	22	0	1	0			0	0	23	0
Al-Rayyan	2007–08	QSL	16	0	2	0			0	0	18	0
Al-Rayyan	Total		64	0	6	0			0	0	70	0
Al-Gharafa	2008–09	QSL	17	0	2	0			3	0	22	0
Al-Gharafa	2009–10	QSL	18	0	1	0			4	0	23	0
Al-Gharafa	2010–11	QSL	15	0	3	0			6	0	24	0
Al-Gharafa	2011–12	QSL	16	0	4	0	1	0	3	0	24	0
Al-Gharafa	2012–13	QSL	20	0	2	0			7	0	29	0
Al-Gharafa	2013–14	QSL	23	0	3	0	0	0	0	0	26	0
Al-Gharafa	2014–15	QSL	19	0	1	0			0	0	20	0
Al-Gharafa	2015–16	QSL	15	0	0	0			0	0	15	0
Lekhwiya SC (loan)	2016–17	QSL	6	0	2	0			5	0	13	0
Lekhwiya b	2016–17	QSD	7	0	0	0					7	0
Lekhwiya b	Total		7	0	0	0					7	0
Al-Gharafa	2017–18	QSL	15	0	2	0			6	0	23	0
Al-Gharafa	2018–19	QSL	1	0	0	0			0	0	1	0
Al-Gharafa	2019–20	QSL	19	0	1	0			0	0	20	0
Al-Gharafa	2020–21	QSL	6	0	0	0			0	0	6	0
Al-Gharafa	2021–22	QSL	0	0	1	0			1	0	2	0
Al-Gharafa	2022–23	QSL	9	0	0	0			0	0	9	0
Al-Gharafa	Total		193	0	20	0			30	0	243	0
Career total			296	0	30	0			35	0	361	0

^{1}Includes Emir of Qatar Cup.

^{2}Includes Sheikh Jassem Cup.

^{3}Includes AFC Champions League.
