= Meshal Abdullah =

Qatari footballer (born 1984)

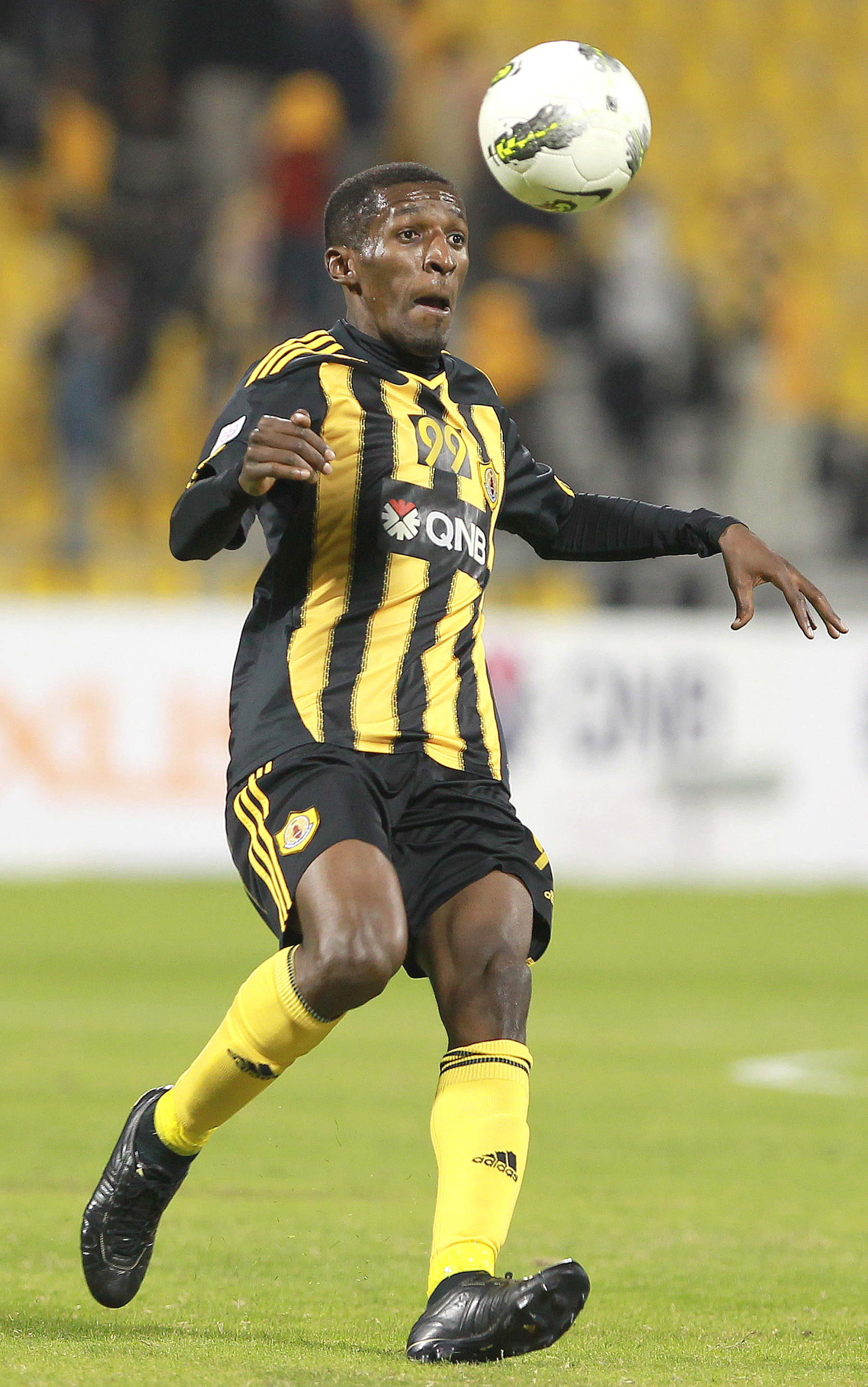

Personal information
- Full name: Meshal Abdullah
- Date of birth: 2 May 1984 (age 42)
- Place of birth: Doha, Qatar
- Height: 1.89 m (6 ft 2 in)
- Position: Striker

Senior career*
| Years | Team | Apps | (Gls) |
| 1999–2007 | Al Ahli | 139 | (57) |
| 2007–2008 | Al Sailiya | 19 | (2) |
| 2008–2010 | Al Ahli | 17 | (2) |
| 2010–2011 | Al Gharrafa | 13 | (1) |
| 2011–2013 | Qatar | 18 | (2) |
| 2013–2019 | Al Ahli | 135 | (61) |
| 2019–2020 | Al-Wakrah | 10 | (0) |

International career^{‡}
| 2005–2015 | Qatar | 43 | (9) |
- * Club domestic league appearances and goals ‡ National team caps and goals as of 10 December 2024

Meshal Abdullah (born 2 May 1984) is a former Qatari footballer. He played as a striker and formerly played for Qatar national football team.
