= Abdelaziz Sanqour =

Emirati professional footballer (born 1989)

Personal information
- Full name: Abdelaziz Mohamed Sanqour Qambar Al-Mazam
- Date of birth: 7 May 1989 (age 37)
- Place of birth: Sharjah, United Arab Emirates
- Height: 1.82 m (6 ft 0 in)
- Position: Full-back

Youth career
- 2003–2009: Al-Ahli
- 2009–2010: Sharjah

Senior career*
Years	Team	Apps	(Gls)
2010–2012	Sharjah	38	(0)
2012–2023	Shabab Al-Ahli	138	(1)
2023–2024	Al-Nasr	22	(0)

International career
2008–2010	United Arab Emirates U20	3	(0)
2011–	United Arab Emirates U23	10	(0)
2012–	United Arab Emirates	36	(1)
- * Club domestic league appearances and goals

Abdelaziz Mohamed Sanqour Qambar Al-Mazam (born 7 May 1989) is an Emirati professional footballer. He plays as a full back for United Arab Emirates national football team. He has competed at the 2012 Summer Olympics.

== International career ==
=== International goals ===
Scores and results list the United Arab Emirates' goal tally first.

No	Date	Venue	Opponent	Score	Result	Competition
1.	3 September 2014	Linzer Stadion, Linz, Austria	Lithuania	1–1	1–1	Friendly

== Honours ==
United Arab Emirates

- Arabian Gulf Cup: 2013
- AFC Asian Cup third-place: 2015
