= Khamis Esmaeel =

Emirati footballer (born 1989)

Personal information
- Full name: Khamis Esmaeel Zayed
- Date of birth: 16 August 1989 (age 37)
- Place of birth: Ras al-Khaimah, United Arab Emirates
- Height: 1.83 m (6 ft 0 in)
- Position: Midfielder

Youth career
- 2005–2009: Emirates

Senior career*
Years	Team	Apps	(Gls)
2009–2011	Emirates		
2011–2016	Al Jazira	80	(4)
2016–2018	Shabab Al-Ahli	43	(1)
2018–2020	Al-Wasl	29	(3)
2020–2022	Al-Wahda	39	(1)
2022–2023	Al Bataeh	11	(0)

International career^{‡}
2008–2010	United Arab Emirates U20	7	(0)
2012	United Arab Emirates U23	3	(0)
2012–2022	United Arab Emirates	77	(1)
- * Club domestic league appearances and goals ‡ National team caps and goals as of 5 January 2022

Khamis Esmaeel (born 16 August 1989, Ras al-Khaimah) is an Emirati professional footballer. He last played as a midfielder for Al-Bataeh and represented the United Arab Emirates national football team. He competed at the 2012 Summer Olympics.

== International career ==
=== International goals ===
Scores and results list the United Arab Emirates' goal tally first.

No.	Date	Venue	Opponent	Score	Result	Competition
1.	21 January 2019	Zayed Sports City Stadium, Abu Dhabi, United Arab Emirates	Kyrgyzstan	1–0	3–2 (a.e.t.)	2019 AFC Asian Cup

== Honours ==
United Arab Emirates

- Arabian Gulf Cup: 2013
- AFC Asian Cup third-place: 2015
