= Mahdi Ali =

Emirati footballer and coach (born 1965)

- Mahdi Ali in 2015

Personal information
- Full name: Mahdi Ali Hassan Redha
- Date of birth: 20 April 1965 (age 61)
- Place of birth: Dubai, United Arab Emirates
- Position: Midfielder

Youth career
- 1973–1983: Al Ahli

Senior career*
Years	Team	Apps	(Gls)
1983–1998	Al Ahli	194	(12)

International career
1985–1990	United Arab Emirates	8	(0)

Managerial career
- 2003: United Arab Emirates U16 (assistant)
- 2008: United Arab Emirates U19
- 2009–2010: Al Ahli
- 2009: United Arab Emirates U20
- 2010–2012: United Arab Emirates U23
- 2012–2017: United Arab Emirates
- 2017–2018: Shabab Al-Ahli
- 2020–2022: Shabab Al-Ahli
Medal record
Men's football
Representing United Arab Emirates (as manager)
AFC Asian Cup
Bronze medal – third place	2015
- * Club domestic league appearances and goals

Mahdi Ali Hassan Redha (born 20 April 1965) is a former Emirati footballer and current coach.

From 2010 until 2012, Ali led the United Arab Emirates Olympic team to qualify for the 2012 Summer Olympics in London. It was the nation's first appearance. He also led the UAE to their second Arabian Gulf Cup title in 2013 and also led them to a third-place finish at the 2015 AFC Asian Cup.

== Playing career ==
Ali took up football with Al Ahli's youth sides at age six, and he progressed steadily through their system. He made his first-team debut at the age of 16 in 1983. Ali won two UAE President's Cup medallions and played a crucial role in the 1988 final against Al Shabab.

== Coaching career ==
=== Early years ===
Ali returned to football after that and has previously coached several United Arab Emirates national football teams at various age-levels. He has also managed some top-level clubs in his native country. A former midfield player of note, Ali's coaching career began in 1998 with the U10s at the Al Ahli in Dubai.

He spent a year in London with his family in 2000 and earned a coaching certificate, and later the football association sent him to Germany for his A level certificate. The UAE FA called him in 2008, while he was on leave from his government job in Dubai, asking him if he would coach the U19 national team.

=== Youth levels ===
Ali has had unprecedented success in leading what has been dubbed the "golden generation" of Emirati players, beginning with the AFC U-19 Championship in 2008 and continuing with a final-eight performance in the FIFA U-20 World Cup in 2009 and a U23 Gulf Cup championship and a silver medal in the Asian Games.

On 7 April 2011, Baniyas appointed Ali as caretaker coach after the club parted company with Lutfi al Benzarti, who led them to promotion in 2009 and fourth in the Pro League in 2010. Baniyas were second in the league when Ali took charge and he maintained that position behind Al Jazira.

=== UAE national team ===
On 15 August 2012, he was appointed as the UAE senior team's coach. He became the fourth non-foreign manager of the national team after replacing Abdullah Masfar. Under his management, the UAE played so well as they finished first in the 2015 AFC Asian Cup qualification and gained the second Arabian Gulf Cup title in 2013, after the first one of Bruno Metsu.

He led United Arab Emirates to the 2015 AFC Asian Cup where they defeated Qatar and Bahrain and lost to Iran and faced Japan in quarter-final and won the match in penalties and reached to semi-finals. However, UAE lost to Australia in semi-finals and failed to progress to the final. His side defeated Iraq 3–2 in third/fourth place play-off and ended their campaign in third-place. He is also the first Emirati coach of national team in an AFC Asian Cup tournament. On 27 February 2015, he extended his contract with UAE until 2018. He resigned from his position after UAE loss to Australia 2–0 on the World Cup qualifications match on 28 March 2017.

=== Shabab Al Ahli ===
Ali coached Shabab Al Ahli during their first season in 2017–18 where they finished mid table, he left after his contract ended without winning any notable domestic trophies. He later returned to the club in the 2020–21 season after the club dismissed their previous coach for the poor start to the season. By late January, Ali would win the 2020 UAE Super Cup after defeating Sharjah 1–0 with an injury time goal scored by Mohammed Marzooq. Ali won his second honour with the club after a 5–4 victory on penalties against Al Nasr on the league cup final. Ali won his third honour in the president's cup final against Al Nasr after defeating them 2–1.

== Managerial statistics ==
As of 26 May 2022

Team	From	To	Record							
Team	From	To	G	W	D	L	GF	GA	GD	Win %
Al Ahli	2 November 2009	4 February 2010	12	6	1	5	24	17	+7	50.00
United Arab Emirates U-23	1 January 2010	12 August 2012	27	17	6	4	53	19	+34	62.96
United Arab Emirates	12 August 2012	28 March 2017	60	35	12	13	121	59	+62	58.33
Shabab Al Ahli Dubai	2 December 2017	30 May 2018	19	8	5	6	23	21	+2	42.11
Shabab Al Ahli Dubai	15 December 2020	26 May 2022	69	37	20	12	114	70	+44	53.62
Total coaching for Shabab Al Ahli			88	45	25	18	137	91	+46	51.14
Total			185	103	44	38	334	187	+147	55.68

== Honours ==
=== Player ===
Al Ahli

- President's Cup: 1988, 1996

=== Manager ===
United Arab Emirates U-19

- AFC U-19 Championship: 2008

United Arab Emirates U-23

- Asian Games silver medalists: 2010

United Arab Emirates

- Arabian Gulf Cup: 2013, third place 2014
- AFC Asian Cup third place: 2015

Shabab Al Ahli

- UAE President's Cup 2020–21
- UAE Super Cup: 2020
- UAE League Cup: 2020–21

== Personal life ==
Mahdi was born in Dubai in 1965. After his playing days, Ali attended the HCT – Dubai Men's College where he graduated as an electrical engineer and later assisted in the design of the Dubai Metro. While working for Dubai Municipality, he helped set up the Road Transit Authority (RTA), and masterminded Dubai's parking project and the ticketing system for the Dubai Metro.
