= Habib Al Fardan =

Emirati footballer (born 1990)

Personal information
- Full name: Habib Fardan Abdulla Fardan Al Fardan
- Date of birth: November 11, 1990 (age 35)
- Place of birth: Dubai, United Arab Emirates
- Height: 1.80 m (5 ft 11 in)
- Position: Attacking midfielder

Team information
- Current team: Dubai United
- Number: 88

Youth career
- 2002–2006: Al-Wasl

Senior career*
Years	Team	Apps	(Gls)
2006–2008	Al-Wasl	23	(4)
2008–2014	Al-Nasr	72	(27)
2014–2018	Shabab Al-Ahli	94	(5)
2018–2021	Al-Nasr	51	(7)
2021–2025	Kalba	70	(7)
2025–	Dubai United	0	(0)

International career^{‡}
2012	United Arab Emirates U23	12	(6)
2011–2019	United Arab Emirates	53	(6)
- * Club domestic league appearances and goals as of 12:11, 18 October 2016 (UTC) ‡ National team caps and goals as of 20 November 2017

Habib Fardan Abdulla Fardan Al Fardan (Arabic: حبيب فردان عبدالله فردان الفردان, born 11 November 1990) is an Emirati professional footballer who plays for Dubai United as an attacking midfielder.

== Club career ==
He started playing in Al Wasl, when he was older he went to Al Nasr. He joined Al Ahli in summer 2014 after he was linked in Al Jazira.

On 7 August 2018, Fardan returned to Al Nasr.

== International career ==
In June 2011, Al Fardan made his international debut in a 2–3 loss to Kuwait in a friendly match. He played for United Arab Emirates at the 2012 Summer Olympics.

=== International goals ===
Scores and results list United Arab Emirates' goal tally first.

Goal	Date	Venue	Opponent	Score	Result	Competition
1.	11 September 2012	Al-Rashid Stadium, Dubai, United Arab Emirates	Kuwait	2–0	3–0	Friendly
2.	6 February 2013	Mỹ Đình National Stadium, Hanoi, Vietnam	Vietnam	2–1	2–1	2015 AFC Asian Cup qualification
3.	5 September 2013	King Fahd International Stadium, Riyadh, Saudi Arabia	Trinidad and Tobago	1–0	3–3	Friendly
4.	19 November 2013	Zayed Sports City Stadium, Abu Dhabi, United Arab Emirates	Vietnam	4–0	5–0	2015 AFC Asian Cup qualification
5.	3 June 2014	Stade des Arbères, Meyrin, Switzerland	Georgia	1–0	1–0	Friendly
6.	3 September 2015	Zayed Sports City Stadium, Abu Dhabi, United Arab Emirates	Malaysia	4–0	10–0	2018 FIFA World Cup qualification

== Honours ==
- AFC Asian Cup third-place (1): 2015
