= Walid Abbas =

Emirati footballer (born 1985)

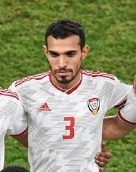
- Abbas with United Arab Emirates in 2019

Personal information
- Full name: Walid Abbas Murad Yousuf Al-Balushi
- Date of birth: 11 June 1985 (age 41)
- Place of birth: Kalba, United Arab Emirates
- Height: 1.73 m (5 ft 8 in)
- Position: Centre-back

Team information
- Current team: Shabab Al-Ahli
- Number: 5

Senior career*
Years	Team	Apps	(Gls)
2002–2013	Al Shabab	256	(7)
2013–2017	Al-Ahli	96	(3)
2017–	Shabab Al-Ahli	118	(5)

International career^{‡}
2008–2023	United Arab Emirates	106	(7)
- * Club domestic league appearances and goals as of 11 May 2021 ‡ National team caps and goals as of 3 December 2021

Walid Abbas Al-Balushi (Arabic: وَلِيد عَبَّاس مُرَاد يُوسُف الْبَلُوشِيّ; born 11 June 1985) is an Emirati professional footballer who plays as a centre-back for Shabab Al-Ahli.

== International career ==
Abbas has played for the United Arab Emirates national team since 2008 and represented the Emirates at the 2011, 2015 and 2019 AFC Asian Cups. At the 2011 tournament, he scored two own goals in two matches against Iran and Iraq.

=== International goals ===
Scores and results list the UAE's goal tally first.

#	Date	Venue	Opponent	Score	Result	Competition
1.	11 September 2012	Al-Rashid Stadium, Dubai, UAE	Kuwait	3–0	3–0	Friendly
2.	15 October 2013	Hong Kong Stadium, Hong Kong	Hong Kong	4–0	4–0	2015 AFC Asian Cup qualification
3.	9 November 2013	Al Nahyan Stadium, Abu Dhabi, UAE	Philippines	2–0	4–0	Friendly
4.	15 November 2013	Mohammed Bin Zayed Stadium, Abu Dhabi	Hong Kong	2–0	4–0	2015 AFC Asian Cup qualification
5.	19 November 2013	Mohammed Bin Zayed Stadium, Abu Dhabi	Vietnam	1–0	5–0	2015 AFC Asian Cup qualification
6.	9 November 2016	Mohammed Bin Zayed Stadium, Abu Dhabi	Bahrain	2–0	2–0	Friendly
