= 2015 AFC Asian Cup Group A =

Football tournament group stage

Group A of the 2015 AFC Asian Cup was one of four groups of nations competing at the 2015 AFC Asian Cup. The group's first round of matches were played on 9 and 10 January, the second round on 13 January, and the final round on 17 January. All six group matches were played at venues in Australia. The group consisted of hosts Australia, South Korea, Oman and Kuwait. South Korea and Australia advanced as group winners and runners-up respectively, while Oman and Kuwait were eliminated.

== Teams ==
Draw position	Team	Method of qualification	Date of qualification	Finals appearance	Last appearance	Previous best performance	FIFA Rankings	
Draw position	Team	Method of qualification	Date of qualification	Finals appearance	Last appearance	Previous best performance	March 2014 (Note: The rankings of March 2014 were used for seeding for the final draw.)	Start of event
A1	Australia	Hosts	5 January 2011	3rd	2011	Runners-up (2011)	63	100
A2	South Korea	2011 AFC Asian Cup third place	28 January 2011	13th	2011	Winners (1956, 1960)	60	69
A3	Oman	Group A winners	19 November 2013	3rd	2007	Group stage (2004, 2007)	81	93
A4	Kuwait	Group B runners-up	19 November 2013	10th	2011	Winners (1980)	110	125

== Standings ==
Pos	Team	Pld	W	D	L	GF	GA	GD	Pts	Qualification
1	South Korea	3	3	0	0	3	0	+3	9	Advance to knockout stage
2	Australia (H)	3	2	0	1	8	2	+6	6	Advance to knockout stage
3	Oman	3	1	0	2	1	5	−4	3	
4	Kuwait	3	0	0	3	1	6	−5	0	

Source: Asian Cup Australia 2015
Rules for classification: Tiebreakers
(H) Hosts

In the quarter-finals:

- South Korea advanced to play Uzbekistan (runner-up of Group B).
- Australia advanced to play China PR (winner of Group B).

== Matches ==
=== Australia vs Kuwait ===
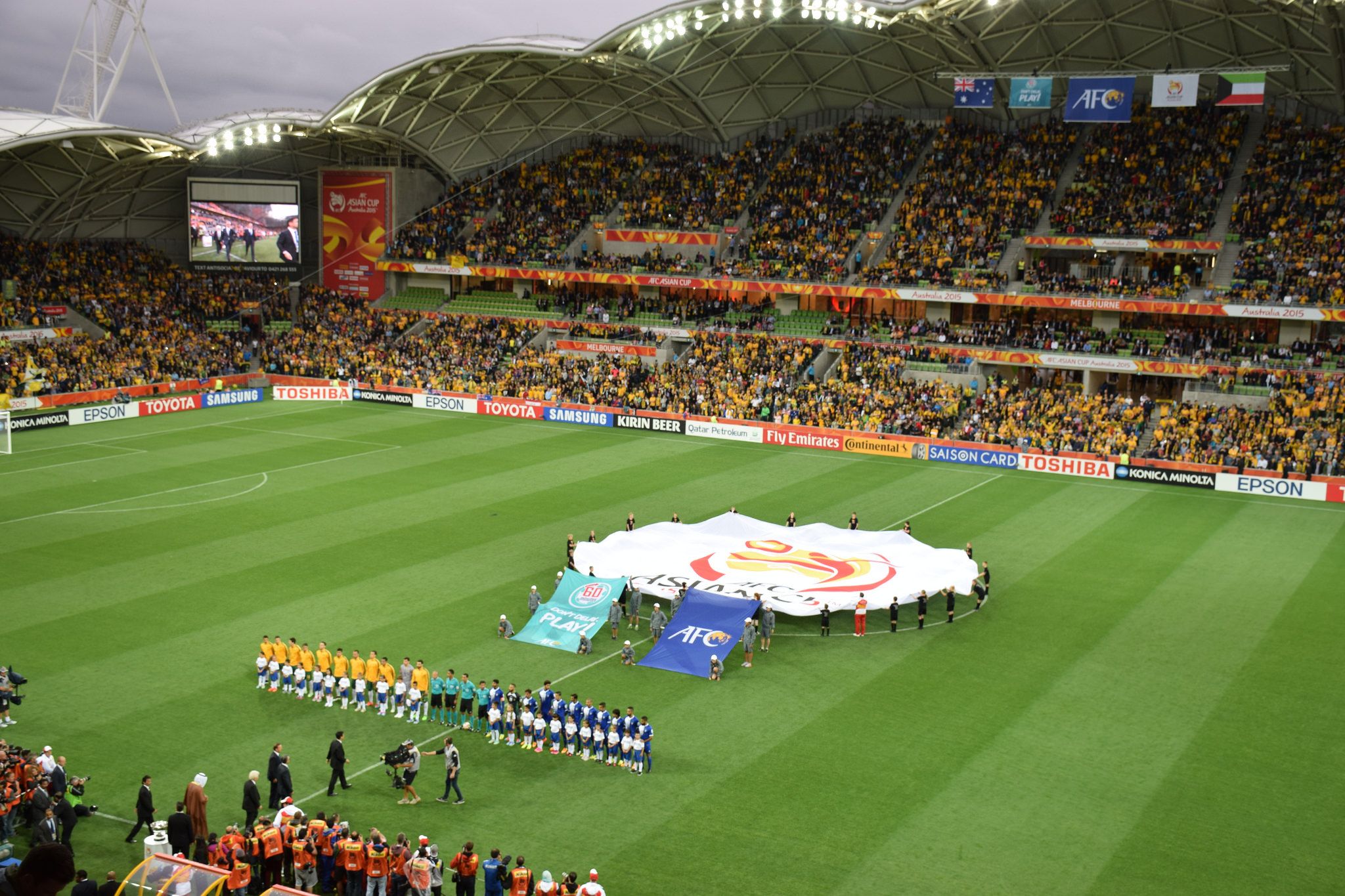
The match between Australia and Kuwait

Hussain Fadhel's eighth-minute header briefly dampened spirits at a sold-out Melbourne Rectangular Stadium only for Massimo Luongo to set up Tim Cahill to equalise with his 37th international goal, 12 minutes before half-time. After Luongo headed home his first for the Socceroos at the end of the first half, a penalty from captain Mile Jedinak two minutes after the hour mark and a late strike from James Troisi secured all three points for the 2011 AFC Asian Cup finalists in the Group A opener. Looking to build on reaching the final of the last edition in Qatar, Australia made a bright start on a chilly evening, but the home side were stunned after just eight minutes as Fadhel stooped at the near post to direct a diving header from Abdulaziz Al Masha'an's right wing corner low past goalkeeper Mathew Ryan having broken clear of defender Trent Sainsbury. Australia were able to double their advantage two minutes after the hour mark as captain Jedinak confidently sent Hameed Youssef the wrong way from the penalty spot after Robbie Kruse had been upended by Sultan Al Enezi just inside the area.

Kuwait came close to setting up a tense finish as only a finger-tip save from Ryan turned Fahad Al Ansari's superb 71st minute effort onto the crossbar, before Australia substitute Nathan Burns followed suit soon after with an acrobatic glancing header at the other end. But it was Australia who looked the more likely to add to their lead and Troisi's close range finish in stoppage time sealed an ultimately impressive victory for the home side.

The win meant that Australia had become the first host since Singapore back in 1984 to win the opening game of the tournament. For Kuwait, the country has failed to register a win since the 3–1 victory over the United Arab Emirates back in 2004.

9 January 2015
20:00 AEDT (UTC+11)

Australia	4–1	Kuwait
Cahill 33'; Luongo 45'; Jedinak 62' (pen.); Troisi 90+2'	Report	Fadhel 8'

Melbourne Rectangular Stadium, Melbourne
Attendance: 25,231
Referee: Ravshan Irmatov (Uzbekistan)

Australia	Kuwait

GK	1	Mathew Ryan
RB	2	Ivan Franjić
CB	20	Trent Sainsbury
CB	6	Matthew Spiranovic
LB	13	Aziz Behich
DM	15	Mile Jedinak (c)
RM	10	Robbie Kruse	(substituted off) 72'
CM	21	Massimo Luongo	(substituted off) 84'
LM	7	Mathew Leckie
CF	14	James Troisi
CF	4	Tim Cahill	(substituted off) 65'
Substitutions:
FW	9	Tomi Juric	(substituted on) 65'
FW	16	Nathan Burns	(substituted on) 72'
MF	23	Mark Bresciano	(substituted on) 84'
Manager:
Ange Postecoglou

GK	23	Hameed Youssef
RB	5	Fahed Al Hajri
CB	4	Hussain Fadhel	(yellow card) 19'	(substituted off) 57'
CB	13	Musaed Neda (c)
LB	6	Khaled Al Qahtani		(substituted off) 75'
RM	8	Saleh Al Sheikh
CM	11	Fahad Al Ansari
CM	12	Sultan Al Enezi
LM	21	Ali Maqseed
CF	10	Abdulaziz Al Masha'an		(substituted off) 64'
CF	16	Faisal Zaid	(yellow card) 47'
Substitutions:
DF	2	Amer Al Fadhel		(substituted on) 57'
FW	20	Yousef Nasser		(substituted on) 64'
FW	17	Bader Al-Mutawa		(substituted on) 75'
Manager:
(Tunisia) Nabil Maâloul

Man of the Match:
Massimo Luongo (Australia)

Assistant referees:
Abdukhamidullo Rasulov (Uzbekistan)
Bakhadyr Kochkarov (Kyrgyzstan)
Fourth official:
Mohd Amirul Izwan Yaacob (Malaysia)
Fifth official:
Mohd Yusri Muhamad (Malaysia)

=== South Korea vs Oman ===
Third place finishers in 2011, South Korea were on top for much of the first period but at half-time had only Cho Young-cheol's stoppage time goal to show for their control of proceedings. A flurry of attacking substitutions in the final 30 minutes did see Oman threaten to level the game, notably through Amad Al-Hosni who had a header tipped onto the crossbar in added time, but South Korea held on to move into second place behind Australia. With a rainy conditions in the Australian capital, South Korea had their first chance on five minutes as midfielder Koo Ja-cheol cut in from the left-hand side and fired in a shot from the edge of the penalty area that Ali Al-Habsi got down low to his right to tip around the post. Two minutes later, Son Heung-min latched on to a long ball over the top from Kim Chang-soo and lifted the ball over Al-Habsi, only to see it bounce off the top of the crossbar and away from danger. Defender Jaber Al-Owaisi had a chance to put Oman ahead against the run of play but turned his header well over the bar from Eid Al-Farsi's corner on 12th minutes. Although, South Korea began to stamp their authority on the game, with six minutes of the half remaining Kim Ju-young brought down Abdulaziz Al-Muqbali and from 20 yards out Al Farsi bent the ball marginally wide of the far post. As the match neared the half-time interval, South Korea scored the opening goal they had long threatened. Al-Habsi had already athletically turned away his own defender Abdul Salam Al-Mukhaini's unintentional header and kept out a long-range free-kick from Son but he was beaten a minute into first half stoppage time.

Lee Chung-yong pounced on a loose ball and laid the ball off to Koo and the midfielder's left footed shot from outside the area was beaten out by Al-Habsi only as far as a sliding Cho who forced the ball back across the wrong-footed goalkeeper and into the opposite corner from close range. South Korea continued as they had left off after the break and four minutes after the restart, Lee drove a low shot into the side netting and then Al-Habsi pulled off a fine reaction save to tip over Koo's header from point-blank range.

Oman coach Paul Le Guen made attacking replacements in the final half hour by bringing on Al-Hosni and Mohsin Al-Khaldi in an attempt to restore parity and on 76th minutes Al-Muqbali had a golden chance to equalize when Ali Al-Busaidi picked him out all alone in the penalty area but the forward's first touch was poor and South Korea cleared their lines. The West Asians continued to put in an improved performance thereafter as South Korea sat back, and in stoppage time Al-Hosni's goal-bound header from a corner was dramatically touched onto the crossbar by Kim Jin-hyeon as Uli Stielike's side narrowly escaped to take all three points.

10 January 2015
16:00 AEDT (UTC+11)

South Korea	1–0	Oman
Cho Young-cheol 45+1'	Report

Canberra Stadium, Canberra
Attendance: 12,552
Referee: Peter O'Leary (New Zealand)

South Korea	Oman

GK	23	Kim Jin-hyeon
RB	2	Kim Chang-soo	(substituted off) 19'
CB	4	Kim Ju-young
CB	20	Jang Hyun-soo
LB	3	Kim Jin-su
CM	6	Park Joo-ho
CM	16	Ki Sung-yueng (c)
RW	17	Lee Chung-yong	(substituted off) 78'
AM	13	Koo Ja-cheol
LW	7	Son Heung-min
CF	9	Cho Young-cheol	(substituted off) 71'
Substitutions:
DF	22	Cha Du-ri	(substituted on) 19'
FW	18	Lee Jung-hyup	(substituted on) 71'
MF	12	Han Kyo-won	(substituted on) 78'
Manager:
(Germany) Uli Stielike

GK	1	Ali Al-Habsi (c)
CB	13	Abdulsalam Al-Mukhaini
CB	3	Jaber Al-Owaisi		(substituted off) 73'
CB	2	Mohammed Al-Musalami
RWB	6	Raed Ibrahim Saleh
LWB	16	Ali Al-Busaidi
RM	7	Mohammed Al-Siyabi		(substituted off) 86'
CM	12	Ahmed Mubarak Al-Mahaijri
CM	8	Eid Al-Farsi
LM	10	Qasim Said		(substituted off) 61'
CF	9	Abdulaziz Al-Muqbali	(yellow card) 32'
Substitutions:
FW	20	Amad Al-Hosni		(substituted on) 61'
MF	21	Mohsin Al-Khaldi		(substituted on) 73'
FW	23	Said Al-Ruzaiqi		(substituted on) 86'
Manager:
(France) Paul Le Guen

Man of the Match:
Koo Ja-cheol (South Korea)

Assistant referees:
Jan-Hendrik Hintz (New Zealand)
Mark Rule (New Zealand)
Fourth official:
Yudai Yamamoto (Japan)
Fifth official:
Najah Raham Alhamaidah (Iraq)

=== Kuwait vs South Korea ===
A goal from Nam Tae-hee meant South Korea would later join Australia, 4-0 winners over Oman, as the first teams to book themselves a place in the tournament's quarter-finals after they defeated Kuwait 1–0 at Canberra Stadium. The midfielder's breakthrough came on 35 minutes from a bullet header but Kuwait would once again be ruing the woodwork after they hit the post early in the second half through Ali Maqseed after having similar misfortune in their opening loss to Australia in the opening match.

Kuwait were eliminated from the tournament and would be playing for pride against Oman in their final group stage tie at Newcastle Stadium after their defeat in Australia's capital. Ahead of the game, both coaches had rung the changes with Uli Stielike bringing in seven new starters due to a swathe of injuries and illness to key players including Lee Chung-yong and Son Heung-min. Kuwait, too, also saw new faces at both ends of the field with defenders Amer Al Fadhel and Fahad Awadh coming in, as well as forwards Abdullah Al Buraiki and Yousef Nasser, all four making their first starts of the campaign. Having lost their Group A opener, the onus was on Kuwait to attack but their early attempts were snuffed out by the Korean backline as the first period began in cagey fashion with little goal-mouth action. But by the half hour mark, the match finally came into life as Kim Min-woo sent Lee Keun-ho through on goal, but Kuwait goalkeeper Hameed Youssef stood up well to get a hand to the Korean striker's attempted lob and he batted the ball over the crossbar.

The warning was not heeded by Kuwait and in their next attack the Koreans took the lead. Kim Min-woo found Cha Du-ri on the right flank and the full back set off on a lung-busting run before whipping in a cross that was met by a towering header from Nam that Youssef could not keep out. The breakthrough sent confidence flowing through the East Asians and they easily played out the remainder of the first period. But the Korean's composure was almost shattered within the first three minutes of the second half as Al Maqseed hit a sublime shot from the right-hand corner of the penalty area that had Kim Seung-gyu beaten as it clattered off the far post. With the second half turning into an exciting end-to-end spectacle, Nam then went close with his own long-range special as he cut inside and drove a low shot narrowly wide of Youssef's left-hand post on the hour mark, before Al Maqseed then went close again after checking inside Jang Hyun-soo and curling inches over the Korean crossbar. Coach Nabil Maâloul threw on star forward Bader Al-Mutawa with just under half an hour remaining as Kuwait pushed for a leveler but it was Korea who went closest to netting next as Kim Min-woo forced a solid save from Youssef as he unleashed an angled drive from inside of the penalty area following a one-two with Lee Keun-ho.

Abdulaziz Al Misha'an went close with a near post attempt before Park Joo-ho and Lee Jung-hyup both had efforts well-saved as the game ended in frenetic fashion with neither team able to make further incursions into the scoreline as Korean fans celebrated in the stands.

13 January 2015
18:00 AEDT (UTC+11)

Kuwait	0–1	South Korea
	Report	Nam Tae-hee 36'

Canberra Stadium, Canberra
Attendance: 8,795
Referee: Alireza Faghani (Iran)

Kuwait	South Korea

GK	23	Hameed Youssef
RB	2	Amer Al Fadhel
CB	5	Fahed Al Hajri
CB	13	Musaed Neda (c)
LB	3	Fahad Awadh	(yellow card) 35'
RM	9	Abdullah Al Buraiki		(substituted off) 75'
CM	11	Fahad Al Ansari
LM	12	Sultan Al Enezi		(substituted off) 64'
AM	21	Ali Maqseed
AM	10	Abdulaziz Al Masha'an
CF	20	Yousef Nasser		(substituted off) 76'
Substitutions:
FW	17	Bader Al-Mutawa		(substituted on) 64'
MF	16	Faisal Zaid		(substituted on) 75'
FW	15	Faisal Al Enezi		(substituted on) 76'
Manager:
(Tunisia) Nabil Maâloul

GK	21	Kim Seung-gyu
RB	22	Cha Du-ri	(yellow card) 70'
CB	20	Jang Hyun-soo	(yellow card) 19'
CB	19	Kim Young-gwon
LB	3	Kim Jin-su
RM	15	Lee Myung-joo		(substituted off) 46'
CM	16	Ki Sung-yueng (c)
LM	6	Park Joo-ho
RF	10	Nam Tae-hee	(yellow card) 42'	(substituted off) 86'
CF	11	Lee Keun-ho
LF	8	Kim Min-woo		(substituted off) 76'
Substitutions:
FW	9	Cho Young-cheol		(substituted on) 46'
FW	18	Lee Jung-hyup		(substituted on) 76'
MF	14	Han Kook-young		(substituted on) 86'
Manager:
(Germany) Uli Stielike

Man of the Match:
Abdulaziz Al Misha'an (Kuwait)

Assistant referees:
Reza Sokhandan (Iran)
Mohammad Reza Abolfazli (Iran)
Fourth official:
Yudai Yamamoto (Japan)
Fifth official:
Najah Alhamaidah (Iraq)

=== Oman vs Australia ===
A second straight four-goal haul means Australia and South Korea would battle for top spot in Group A in Brisbane at the weekend after Ange Postecoglou's Socceroos handed Oman a comprehensive 4–0 defeat at Stadium Australia on to advance to the quarter-finals of the tournament. A draw would be enough for the tournament hosts on 17 January evening to win the group on goal difference and set up a quarter-final clash with the runners-up in Group B, after two goals in three minutes from Matt McKay and Robbie Kruse sent Australia on their way to an impressive victory. A penalty from Mark Milligan and a close range strike from second-half substitute Tomi Juric added to Oman's woes in a game in which Paul Le Guen's side were totally outclassed. Coupled with South Korea's 1-0 win over Kuwait earlier, the two quarter-finals berths from Group A have now been filled, with only the positions at the top of the table left to be determined.

McKay was drafted into the starting line-up as Postecoglou made three changes to the team that handed Kuwait a 4–1 thrashing in the opening game, with injured captain Mile Jedinak replaced by Mark Milligan, and McKay and Jason Davidson came in instead of James Troisi and Aziz Behich. The changes did little to disrupt the rhythm of the Socceroos, who steadily took control of the game after an early scare, when Raed Ibrahim Saleh's third minute thunderbolt from long range was brilliantly palmed to safety by Mat Ryan. However, the Socceroos, just as they did against Kuwait in the tournament opener in Melbourne, slowly took control of the game and by the time the clock had ticked past the halfway point in the opening period, Australia were in total command. Tim Cahill, captain for the night in Jedinak's absence twice went close with looping headers before McKay, one of the heroes of Australia's run to the final in Qatar four years ago, put his side in front.

Kruse's 27th minute corner from the Omani right was headed goalward by Trent Sainsbury and McKay scooped the ball over the line from close range to lift the majority of 50,276 fans to their feet. Three minutes later the Australians doubled their advantage, with Kruse this time starting and finishing a fine move with a run from just inside his own half, laying the ball off to Massimo Luongo, whose return pass the Bayer Leverkusen striker slipped under Ali Al-Habsi. Milligan converted from the spot three minutes into first half injury time after Cahill was hauled down by Ali Al-Busaidi as the Socceroos closed out an impressive opening 45 minutes with another goal.

Cahill and Luongo made way for Juric and Mark Bresciano five minutes after the restart and, with 20 minutes to go, Western Sydney Wanderers' striker Juric put the seal on the win with a sliding finish after Leckie's superb cross from the left with the outside of his right boot gave the Oman defence little chance.

13 January 2015
20:00 AEDT (UTC+11)

Oman	0–4	Australia
	Report	McKay 27'; Kruse 30'; Milligan 45+2' (pen.); Juric 70'

Stadium Australia, Sydney
Attendance: 50,276
Referee: Ryuji Sato (Japan)

Oman	Australia

GK	1	Ali Al-Habsi (c)
CB	13	Abdulsalam Al-Mukhaini	(yellow card) 45+1'
CB	3	Jaber Al-Owaisi
CB	2	Mohammed Al-Musalami
RWB	6	Raed Ibrahim Saleh		(substituted off) 88'
LWB	16	Ali Al-Busaidi		(substituted off) 46'
RM	12	Ahmed Mubarak Al-Mahaijri	(yellow card) 36'
CM	8	Eid Al-Farsi
LM	21	Mohsin Al-Khaldi
CF	9	Abdulaziz Al-Muqbali
CF	20	Amad Al-Hosni		(substituted off) 46'
Substitutions:
MF	4	Ali Al-Jabri		(substituted on) 46'
DF	11	Amer Said Al-Shatri		(substituted on) 46'
DF	15	Ali Salim Al-Nahar		(substituted on) 88'
Manager:
(France) Paul Le Guen

GK	1	Mathew Ryan
CB	20	Trent Sainsbury
CB	5	Mark Milligan
CB	6	Matthew Spiranovic	(yellow card) 73'
RM	2	Ivan Franjić
CM	17	Matt McKay
CM	21	Massimo Luongo		(substituted off) 51'
LM	3	Jason Davidson	(yellow card) 87'
AM	4	Tim Cahill (c)		(substituted off) 51'
CF	10	Robbie Kruse
CF	7	Mathew Leckie		(substituted off) 77'
Substitutions:
FW	9	Tomi Juric		(substituted on) 51'
MF	23	Mark Bresciano		(substituted on) 51'
FW	11	Tommy Oar		(substituted on) 77'
Manager:
Ange Postecoglou

Man of the Match:
Robbie Kruse (Australia)

Assistant referees:
Toru Sagara (Japan)
Toshiyuki Nagi (Japan)
Fourth official:
Muhammad Taqi (Singapore)
Fifth official:
Jeffrey Goh Gek Pheng (Singapore)

=== Australia vs South Korea ===
Host country, Australia lost 1–0 against South Korea at Brisbane Stadium thanks to a goal from striker Lee Jung-hyup. The loss was Australia's first defeat on home soil since losing to Kuwait in qualifying for the 2011 AFC Asian Cup in March 2009, means the Koreans top Group A and would play either Saudi Arabia or Uzbekistan in the quarter-finals in Melbourne. This result also meant for the first time, South Korea managed to beat Australia in Australian turf, be it in a major football competition or friendly. Australia meanwhile would take on China PR in the quarter-finals at the same ground. Lee Jeong-hyeop scored 13 minutes before the end of the first half in a thrilling encounter but the Koreans did not emerge unscathed, with midfielders Koo Ja-cheol and Park Joo-ho both departing from the game with injuries. Aziz Behich returned to the starting line-up for the Australians, as did Tomi Juric, while Son Heung-min remained on the bench for the Koreans despite having recovered from the fever that kept him out of the 1–0 win over Kuwait.

Just after the half hour mark, it was the Koreans who made the breakthrough in a fascinating first half. Despite having Park Joo-ho off the pitch receiving treatment following a clash with Nathan Burns that earned the Australian striker a yellow card, the Koreans took the lead following a fine move instigated by Ki Sung-yueng and finished off by Lee Jeong-hyeop. Swansea midfielder Ki slipped the ball inside Australian left back Ivan Franjić to former Asian Footballer of the Year Lee Keun-ho and his low ball towards the far post was given the faintest of touches by Lee Jung-hyup to deflect it over the line. The goal was South Korea's first on-target effort in the half, with Kwak Tae-hwi's 15th-minute header having earlier gone just wide of Mat Ryan's goal. The hosts were the livelier of the two teams in the opening exchanges, and Burns was given the chance to punish a mistake by Kim Young-gwon after just 11 minutes, only to waste the opportunity.

Burns was Australia's most likely source of a goal in the opening 45 minutes, and the majority of the 48,513 crowd inside a packed Brisbane Stadium thought the Wellington Phoenix striker had leveled the game four minutes after the Koreans had taken the lead, but the ball hit the side netting. Knowing a draw would ensure top spot in the group standings, the Australians pushed hard in the second half for the equaliser. Juric missed a gilt-edged chance eight minutes after the restart when he steered Franjić's return pass over the bar from six yards out while 11 minutes later substitute Mathew Leckie found the arms of Kim Jin-hyeon with his effort on the turn.

Burns' last involvement in the game almost yielded the leveler for the Australian team in the 70th minute as he surged through the middle of the Korean defence before seeing Kim Jin-hyeon save at full stretch before Kim Chang-soo hacked to safety. Robbie Kruse and Tim Cahill came off the bench for the final 20 minutes, replacing Burns and Matt McKay respectively, but the duo were unable to break South Korea's defensive resistance, with Kruse coming closest two minutes from the end when Kim Jin-hyeon deflected his close-range effort over the bar.

17 January 2015
19:00 AEST (UTC+10)

Australia	0–1	South Korea
	Report	Lee Jung-hyup 33'

Brisbane Stadium, Brisbane
Attendance: 48,513
Referee: Nawaf Shukralla (Bahrain)

Australia	South Korea

GK	1	Mathew Ryan
CB	20	Trent Sainsbury
CB	5	Mark Milligan (c)
CB	6	Matthew Spiranovic	(yellow card) 79'
RM	2	Ivan Franjić
CM	17	Matt McKay		(substituted off) 71'
CM	21	Massimo Luongo
LM	13	Aziz Behich
AM	14	James Troisi		(substituted off) 60'
CF	9	Tomi Juric
CF	16	Nathan Burns	(yellow card) 29'	(substituted off) 71'
Substitutions:
FW	7	Mathew Leckie		(substituted on) 60'
MF	4	Tim Cahill	(yellow card) 90+1'	(substituted on) 71'
FW	10	Robbie Kruse		(substituted on) 71'
Manager:
Ange Postecoglou

GK	23	Kim Jin-hyeon
RB	2	Kim Chang-soo	(yellow card) 61'
CB	5	Kwak Tae-hwi
CB	19	Kim Young-gwon
LB	3	Kim Jin-su
CM	6	Park Joo-ho		(substituted off) 41'
CM	16	Ki Sung-yueng (c)
RW	12	Han Kyo-won	(yellow card) 58'	(substituted off) 76'
AM	13	Koo Ja-cheol		(substituted off) 49'
LW	11	Lee Keun-ho
CF	18	Lee Jung-hyup
Substitutions:
MF	14	Han Kook-young		(substituted on) 41'
MF	7	Son Heung-min		(substituted on) 49'
DF	20	Jang Hyun-soo		(substituted on) 76'
Manager:
(Germany) Uli Stielike

Man of the Match:
Ki Sung-yueng (South Korea)

Assistant referees:
Yaser Tulefat (Bahrain)
Ebrahim Saleh (Bahrain)
Fourth official:
Muhammad Taqi (Singapore)
Fifth official:
Jeffrey Goh Gek Pheng (Singapore)

=== Oman vs Kuwait ===
Oman beat Kuwait 1–0 at Newcastle Stadium to finish in third place of the Group A. With both teams having lost their first two games to effectively be eliminated from the competition, the meeting between the Persian Gulf rivals had little riding on it. Oman ensured they did not finish bottom of the group by pulling off a victory thanks to a solitary goal from Abdulaziz Al-Muqbali despite Kuwait having much the better of the game. Kuwait side would feel hard done by as they outplayed their opponents for much of the match. However, a goal in the 69th minute by Al Muqbali was all that mattered for Oman at the end of the day.

After a quiet start to the first half Kuwait began to find their rhythm, and managed the first shot on goal in the 11th minute when Musaed Neda fired in a free kick from just outside the box on the right which sailed over the bar. Just before the half hour mark Khaled Al Qahtani received the ball in space in the box on the right following a fine pass from Abdullah Al Buraiki. He had time to pull the trigger, but sent in a poor effort that flew high and right of the goal. Four minutes later on the other side of the box Kuwait had another great chance when Fahed Al Hajri was unmarked and after being on the end of a fine ball he volleyed wide of the mark. In the 42nd minute Fahad Al Ansari sent in a brilliant shot from the right and well outside the box. It was slightly too high but forced the keeper to make a dive at full stretch to make sure his goal was protected.

The second half saw Kuwait continue to exert pressure on Oman as they went in search of a breakthrough goal. Five minutes into the second half, Oman's Jaber Al-Owaisi came so close to scoring a spectacular own goal when in trying to clear the ball he headed it just over his own cross bar. In the 53rd minute, Al Hajri shot low and left of the right hand post from just outside the box. Shortly after Al Buraiki broke down the right and as he closed in on goal quickly to fire off a shot that was well saved by Oman's goalkeeper and captain Ali Al-Habsi. Completely against the run of play Oman broke the deadlock in the 69th minute when they scored a textbook goal.

Mohammed Al-Siyabi fired in a pinpoint cross from the right to Al Muqbali, who was unmarked and produced a fine header from close range that easily beat the keeper. Two minutes later, Al Muqbali could have made it 2–0 when he was found in the middle of the box again, but he shot well wide. Oman maintained the pressure and Qasim Said could have added another when he was found in space shortly after on the left but he blasted his shot straight at the keeper. At the other end Kuwait quickly retaliated and had two fine opportunities to draw level. In the 79th minute Al Buraiki had a clear header but failed to find the target and then one minute later from a similar position Yousef Nasser also glanced the ball wide as Kuwait finished bottom of Group A.

17 January 2015
20:00 AEDT (UTC+11)

Oman	1–0	Kuwait
Al-Muqbali 69'	Report

Newcastle Stadium, Newcastle
Attendance: 7,499
Referee: Fahad Al-Mirdasi (Saudi Arabia)

Oman	Kuwait

GK	1	Ali Al-Habsi (c)
RB	15	Ali Salim Al-Nahar
CB	13	Abdulsalam Al-Mukhaini	(yellow card) 66'
CB	3	Jaber Al-Owaisi
LB	16	Ali Al-Busaidi
CM	12	Ahmed Mubarak Al-Mahaijri
CM	8	Eid Al-Farsi
RW	6	Raed Ibrahim Saleh		(substituted off) 90+2'
AM	23	Said Al-Ruzaiqi		(substituted off) 58'
LW	10	Qasim Said		(substituted off) 82'
CF	9	Abdulaziz Al-Muqbali
Substitutions:
FW	7	Mohammed Al-Siyabi		(substituted on) 58'
MF	4	Ali Al-Jabri		(substituted on) 82'
DF	5	Nasser Al-Shimli		(substituted on) 90+2'
Manager:
(France) Paul Le Guen

GK	22	Sulaiman Abdulghafour
RB	2	Amer Al Fadhel
CB	5	Fahed Al Hajri
CB	13	Musaed Neda (c)
LB	3	Fahad Awadh
RM	9	Abdullah Al Buraiki
CM	11	Fahad Al Ansari	(yellow card) 24'	(substituted off) 74'
LM	21	Ali Maqseed
AM	16	Faisal Zaid		(substituted off) 68'
AM	10	Abdulaziz Al Masha'an	(yellow card) 60'	(substituted off) 74'
CF	20	Yousef Nasser
Substitutions:
FW	17	Bader Al-Mutawa		(substituted on) 68'
MF	14	Talal Al Amer		(substituted on) 74'
FW	15	Faisal Al Enezi		(substituted on) 74'
Manager:
(Tunisia) Nabil Maâloul

Man of the Match:
Abdulaziz Al-Muqbali (Oman)

Assistant referees:
Badr Al-Shumrani (Saudi Arabia)
Abdulla Al Shalwai (Saudi Arabia)
Fourth official:
Yudai Yamamoto (Japan)
Fifth official:
Azman Ismail (Malaysia)
