= 2015 AFC Asian Cup final =

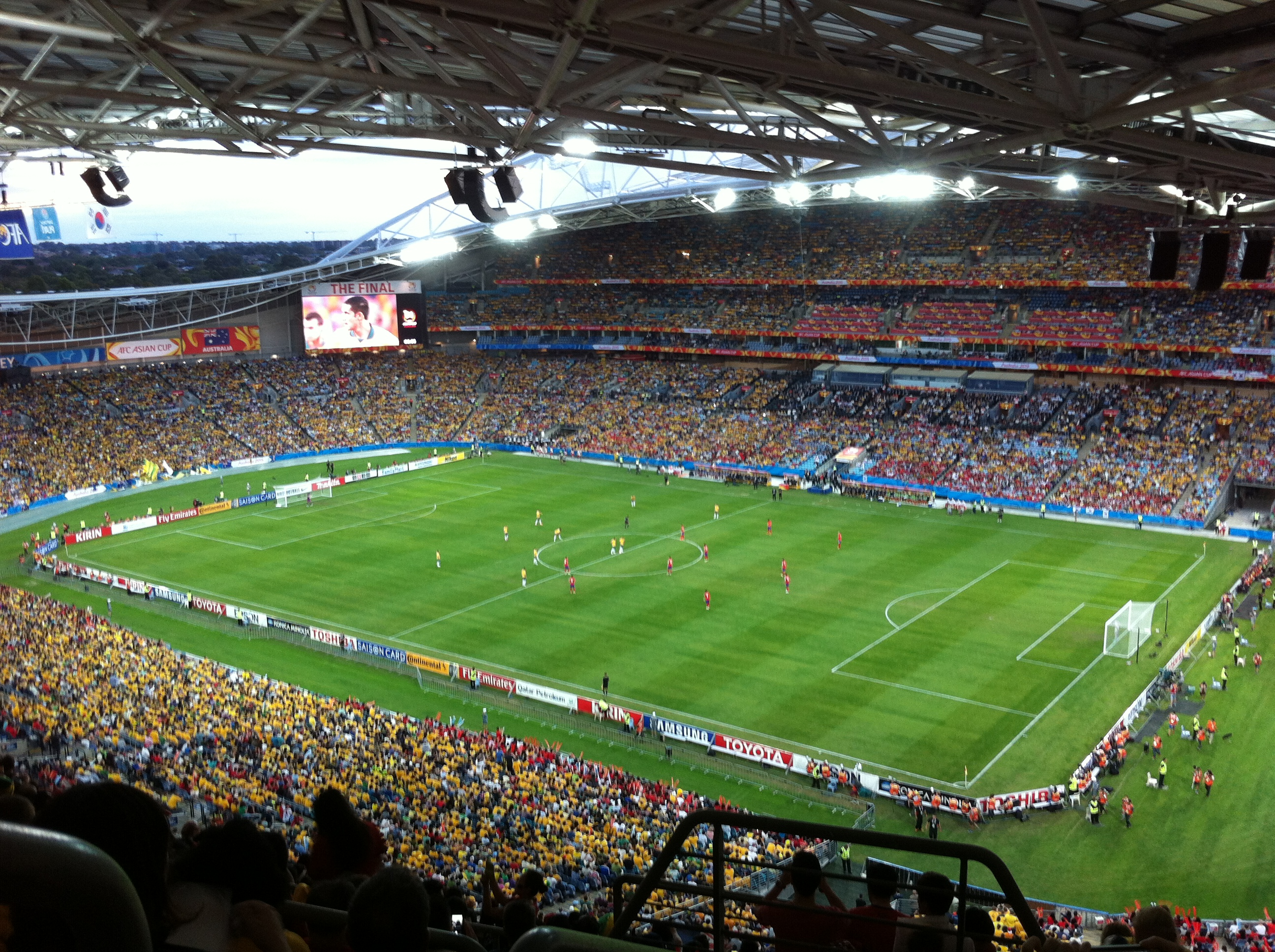
- The final was held in the Stadium Australia
- Event: 2015 AFC Asian Cup
South Korea	Australia
(South Korea)	(Australia)
1	2
- After extra time
- Date: 31 January 2015
- Venue: Stadium Australia, Sydney
- Man of the Match: Trent Sainsbury (Australia)
- Referee: Alireza Faghani (Iran)
- Attendance: 76,385
- Weather: Partly cloudy 22 °C (72 °F); 63% humidity

The 2015 AFC Asian Cup final was a football match which took place on 31 January 2015 at Stadium Australia in Sydney, Australia, to determine the winner of the 2015 AFC Asian Cup. It was played between South Korea and the hosts Australia. Australia won the match 2–1 in extra time and qualified for the 2017 FIFA Confederations Cup in Russia.

Before the match, South Korea had reached the AFC Asian Cup final three times (1972, 1980 and 1988), finishing runners-up in all attempts since a knockout system was introduced. However, prior to such a system, South Korea had won the tournament twice (1956 and 1960). Australia had reached one final (2011) since moving to the Asian Football Confederation from the Oceania Football Confederation in 2006.

== Background ==
Prior to the tournament, the two finalists had previously met each other 26 times, with South Korea winning nine games and Australia ten. The two sides first met on 14 November 1967 in the final of the 1967 Quoc Khanh Cup in South Vietnam. Australia won the match 3–2 and secured the nation's first honour in international football. The last meeting between the two teams, a 0–0 draw, took place on 20 July 2013, at the 2013 EAFF East Asian Cup in South Korea. Australia, who began the 2015 Asian Cup as one of the favourites, was ranked 100 in the FIFA World Rankings and tenth among AFC teams, while South Korea was ranked 69 overall, and third among AFC teams.

South Korea entered the 2015 Asian Cup as two-time Asian champions, having won the first two instalments of the tournament. However, the 2015 final was South Korea's first appearance in the final in 26 years and only their third appearance in the final since a knockout system was introduced. South Korea was first crowned champions of Asia in the inaugural 1956 edition of the Asian Cup, held in Hong Kong. There, the competition was formatted as a round-robin tournament between four teams with no final, and South Korea won the tournament after just three matches. South Korea successfully defended their title in 1960 on home soil. It was not until 1972 that South Korea would get the chance to contest the Asian title again, in the tournament's first ever final after the change to a knockout format. South Korea lost the match against Iran 2–1 in extra time. South Korea again failed to win the final match in 1980, when they lost 3–0 against host nation Kuwait. In 1988, South Korea contested the final against Saudi Arabia in Qatar. After remaining scoreless at the end of extra time, the match was decided in a penalty shoot-out, with the Saudis taking home the title through a 4–3 win.

The 2015 final was Australia's second consecutive time contesting an Asian Cup final out of only three appearances since moving to the Asian Football Confederation from the Oceania Football Confederation in 2006. In 2011, Australia lost to Japan 1–0 in extra time.

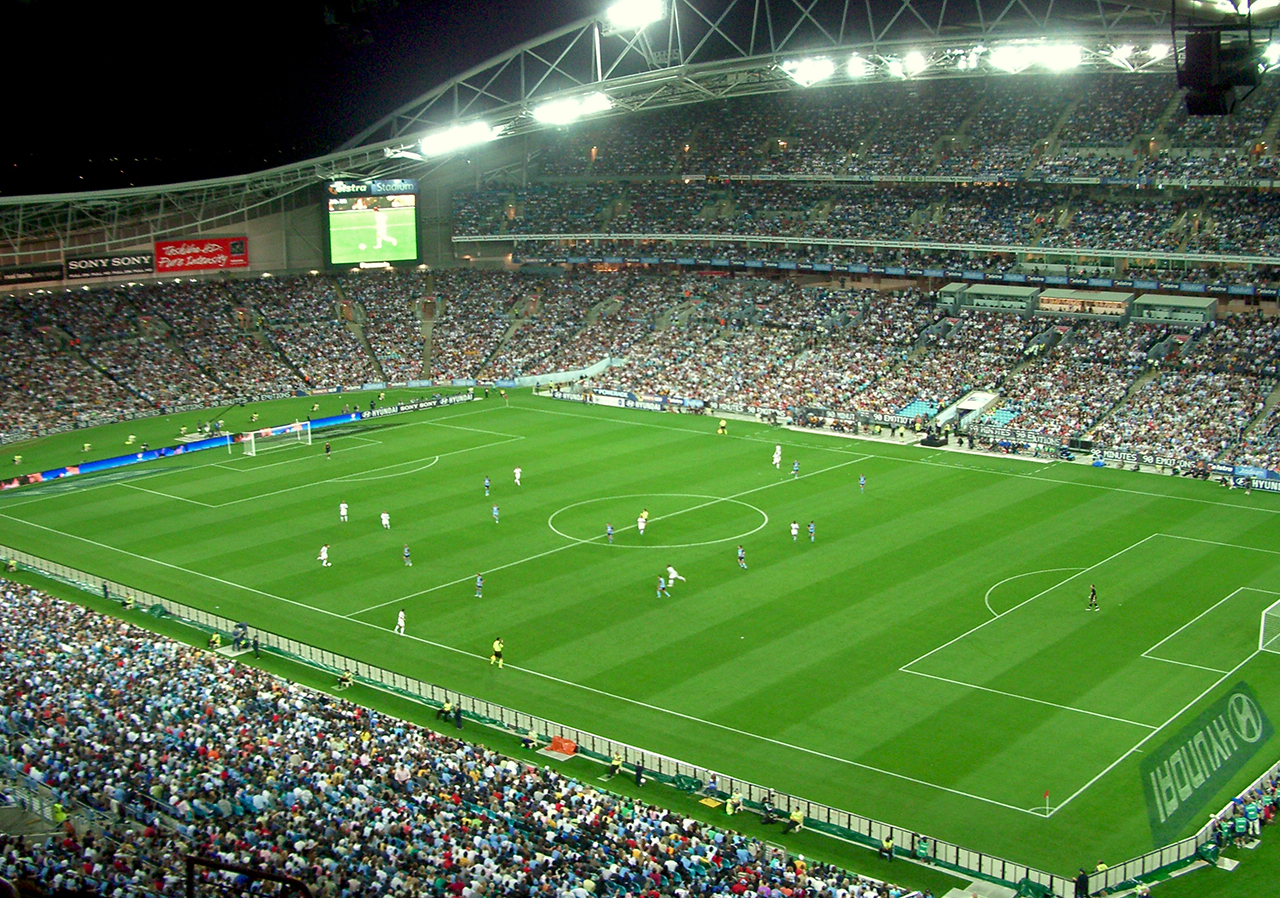
Stadium Australia in Sydney hosted the 2015 AFC Asian Cup final

Stadium Australia was announced as the venue of the 2015 final on 27 March 2013, along with the announcement of the five stadiums used in the tournament. The venue was chosen in preference to Melbourne Rectangular Stadium, which was instead selected to host the opening match of the tournament between Australia and Kuwait. The stadium chosen for the final had the largest capacity of those used in the tournament, with a capacity crowd of 84,000. It was first opened in 1999, and was built to host the 2000 Sydney Olympics. The venue has played host to a number of Sydney's major sporting events, and it was used for seven matches in the 2015 AFC Asian Cup, including four group matches, a quarter-final and semi-final match, as well as the final.

== Route to the final ==
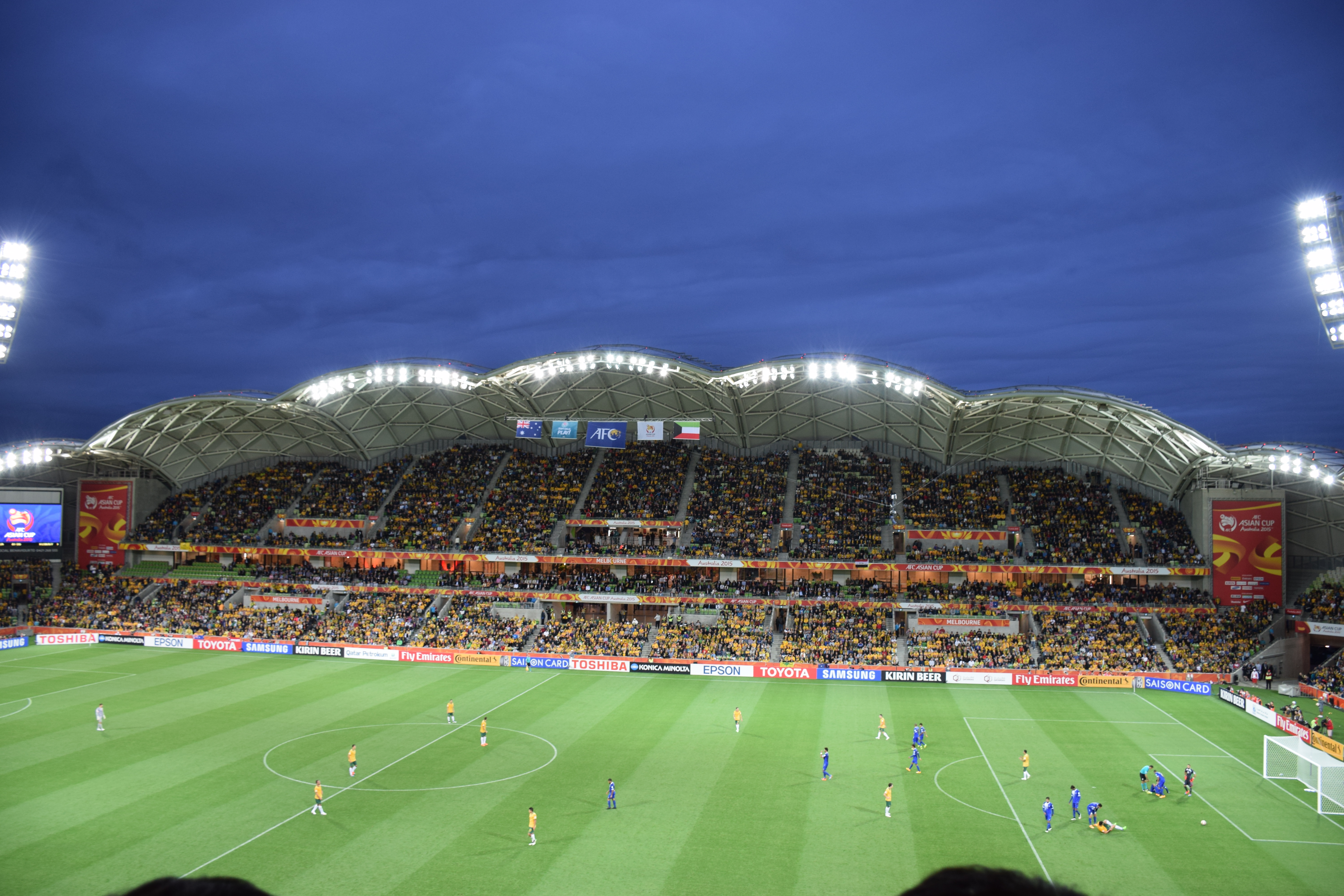
Australia's opening match against Kuwait at the Melbourne Rectangular Stadium

Both South Korea and Australia were drawn into Group A of the 2015 AFC Asian Cup, along with lower ranked sides Oman and Kuwait. After winning all three group matches, South Korea finished first in the group. Host nation Australia finished second in the group to progress to the knockout stage of the tournament.

=== South Korea ===
South Korea's first match against Oman was played at Canberra Stadium. A single goal by Cho Young-cheol in the 46th minute during injury time was enough for the South Korean's to take all three points. South Korea played their second match against Kuwait in Canberra. A goal by Nam Tae-hee saw the game end 1–0. In their final group match South Korea played Australia at a sold out Brisbane Stadium. The match would decide the final standings of the group, with South Korea needing a win to finish top in the group. A goal from striker Lee Jung-hyup in the 33rd minute gave South Korea their third 0–1 win in the tournament. South Korea progressed to the quarter-final stage to face Group B runner-up Uzbekistan. After a goalless 90 minutes, the match was taken into extra time, where Son Heung-min found the net twice to end the game 2–0. In the semi-finals, South Korea took on Iraq in Stadium Australia. Goals by Lee Jung-hyup and Kim Young-gwon ended the match 2–0, with South Korea progressing to the 2015 final.

=== Australia ===
Australia's Asian Cup run started in the opening match of the tournament against Kuwait. Hussain Fadhel's eighth-minute header had briefly dampened spirits at a sold out Melbourne Rectangular Stadium only for Massimo Luongo to set up Tim Cahill on the 33rd minute to equalise with his 37th international goal. After Luongo headed home his first for Australia at the end of the first half, a penalty from captain Mile Jedinak in the 62nd minute and a late strike from James Troisi secured the three points for Australia. In their second match, Australia played Oman in Sydney. Goals from Matt McKay, Robbie Kruse, Tomi Jurić and a penalty scored by Mark Milligan gave Australia a 0–4 win. After failing to secure any points from their final group match against South Korea, Australia next faced Group B winners China PR in the quarter-finals in Brisbane Stadium. Cahill opened the scoring shortly after the half-time break before doubling the lead midway through the second-half, ensuring Australia reached the last four. In the semi-finals, Australia faced United Arab Emirates in Newcastle Stadium. A 2–0 result with goals from Trent Sainsbury and Jason Davidson sent Australia into their second consecutive Asian Cup final.

South Korea
Round
Australia
Opponent
Result
Group stage
Opponent
Result
Oman
1–0
Match 1
Kuwait
4–1
Kuwait
1–0
Match 2
Oman
4–0
Australia
1–0
Match 3
South Korea
0–1
Group A winner

Team	Pld	W	D	L	GF	GA	GD	Pts
South Korea	3	3	0	0	3	0	+3	9
Australia	3	2	0	1	8	2	+6	6
Oman	3	1	0	2	1	5	−4	3
Kuwait	3	0	0	3	1	6	−5	0

Final standings
Group A runner-up

Team	Pld	W	D	L	GF	GA	GD	Pts
South Korea	3	3	0	0	3	0	+3	9
Australia	3	2	0	1	8	2	+6	6
Oman	3	1	0	2	1	5	−4	3
Kuwait	3	0	0	3	1	6	−5	0

Opponent
Result
Knockout stage
Opponent
Result
Uzbekistan
2–0 (a.e.t.)
Quarter-finals
China
2–0
Iraq
2–0
Semi-finals
United Arab Emirates
2–0

== Pre-match ==
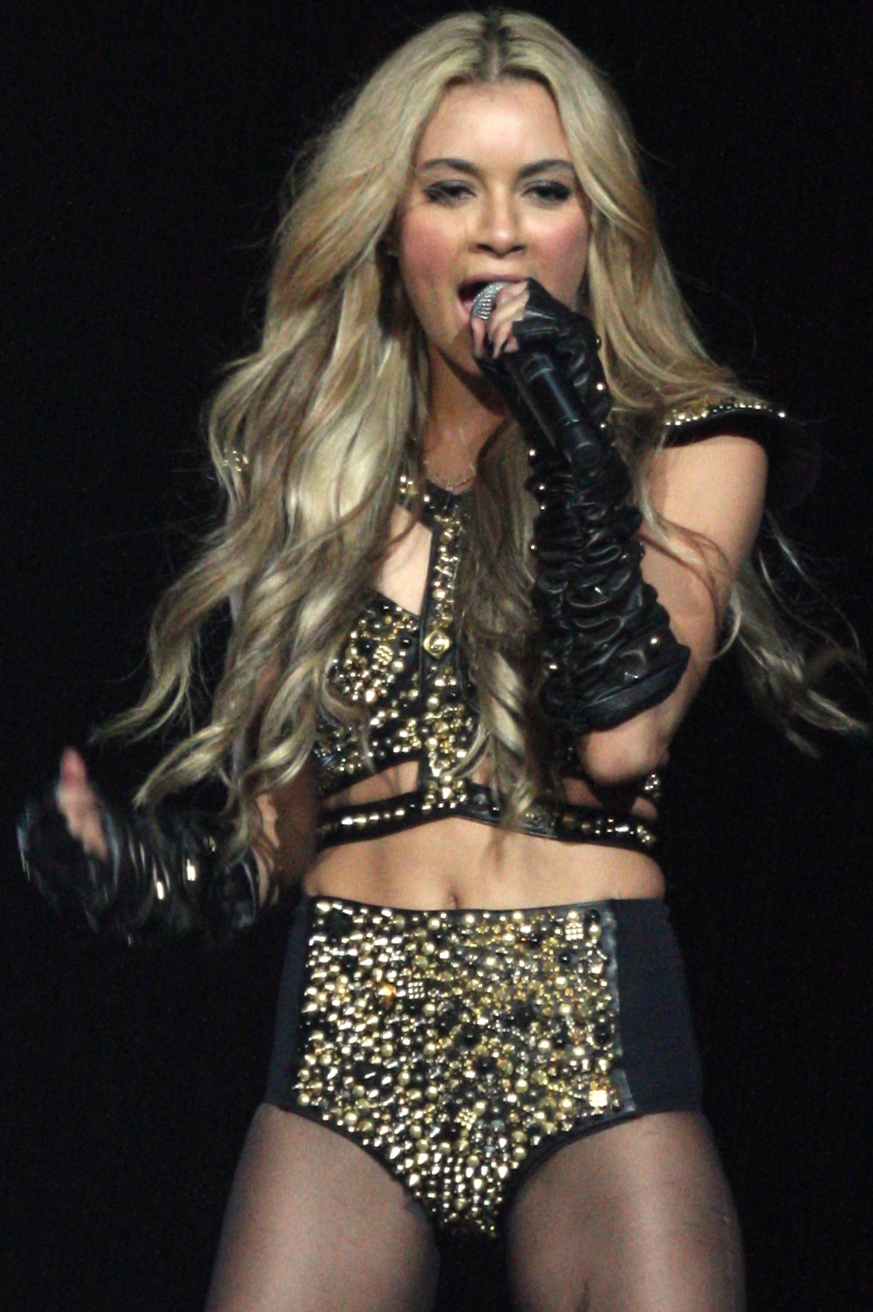
Havana Brown performed at the closing ceremony

Individual match tickets for the final were sold directly by the AFC via its website from 3 June 2014. The final also included the Sydney "Venue Pack", which gave access to every match of the tournament played in Sydney. 76,000 seats were made available for the final clash, with roughly 7,000 seats kept by the AFC to accommodate media and other parties. Prices varied from $39 to $150. 66,000 tickets had been sold for the final prior to Australia's semi-final match in 2.7 minutes, with more than 10,000 additional tickets sold within 1.4 minutes of the win for Australia.

Iranian Alireza Faghani was named as the referee of the final, together with fellow countrymen Reza Sokhandan and Mohammad Reza Abolfazli as his assistants. The trio had officiated in four 2015 Asian Cup matches, including group matches between Saudi Arabia and China PR, Kuwait and South Korea and Iraq and Japan, as well as the quarter-final match between Japan and the United Arab Emirates. Faghani had previously taken charge of a number of international matches, with the most notable being the 2009 AFC President's Cup Final, 2010 AFC Challenge Cup Final and the first leg of the 2014 AFC Champions League Final.

The closing ceremony of the 2015 AFC Asian Cup took place before the final. As with the opening ceremony of the tournament, the closing ceremony featured a performance by Australian DJ, singer and dancer Havana Brown.

== Match ==
=== Summary ===
Stielike made one change to the line-up that saw off Iraq in the semi-finals, calling up Jang Hyun-soo to partner Ki Sung-yueng in the middle to allow Park Joo-ho to sit in front of Kim Jin-su on the left, while Ivan Franjić was passed fit for an unchanged Australian side. The game opened at a frantic pace and, by the end of the half, Australia had taken the lead against the run of play after South Korea had spurned several opportunities to put themselves on the scoreboard. It was Son Heung-min who caused the greatest threat to the Australian goal, volleying just wide in the 37th minute after impressive work down the left from Park Joo-ho and Kim Jin-su while, less than a minute later, the South Korean was denied what looked a certain goal by Luongo's outstretched foot. Tim Cahill had earlier forced Kim Jin-hyeon into action in the South Korean goal, the keeper diving to his left to push the Australian's effort around the post after holding off the challenge of Kwak Tae-hwi, who had sent his own header just wide mere seconds later at the other end.

But with barely a minute left in the half, Luongo struck to put Australia in front. Trent Sainsbury's ball into the feet of Luongo allowed him to turn and beat Ki Sung-yueng before hitting a low, unstoppable right-foot effort beyond Kim Jin-hyeon, conceding South Korea its first goal in the tournament. The South Koreans were forced to push for the equaliser as the second half wore on and a disciplined Australian defence kept them at bay until, a minute into stoppage time, Son Heung-min latched on to Ki Sung-yueng's pass to fire beyond Mathew Ryan and send the game into extra time. But James Troisi put the Socceroos back in front in the 105th minute when he was first to react after Kim Jin-hyeon pushed Tomi Jurić's shot towards Troisi back into play. The midfielder fired the ball high into the net to seal the win and see Australia become champions of Asia.

=== Details ===
31 January 2015
20:00 AEDT (UTC+11)

South Korea	1–2 (a.e.t.)	Australia
Son Heung-min 90+1'	Report	Luongo 45'; Troisi 105'

Stadium Australia, Sydney
Attendance: 76,385
Referee: Alireza Faghani (Iran)

South Korea	Australia

GK	23	Kim Jin-hyeon
CB	5	Kwak Tae-hwi
CB	20	Jang Hyun-soo
CB	19	Kim Young-gwon
RM	22	Cha Du-ri
CM	16	Ki Sung-yueng (c)
CM	6	Park Joo-ho	(substituted off) 71'
LM	3	Kim Jin-su
RF	10	Nam Tae-hee	(substituted off) 63'
CF	18	Lee Jeong-hyeop	(substituted off) 87'
LF	7	Son Heung-min
Substitutes:
FW	11	Lee Keun-ho	(substituted on) 63'
MF	14	Han Kook-young	(substituted on) 71'
DF	4	Kim Ju-young	(substituted on) 87'
Manager:
(Germany) Uli Stielike

GK	1	Mathew Ryan
CB	20	Trent Sainsbury
CB	5	Mark Milligan
CB	6	Matthew Spiranovic	(yellow card) 59'
RWB	2	Ivan Franjić	(yellow card) 6'	(substituted off) 74'
LWB	3	Jason Davidson	(yellow card) 41'
DM	15	Mile Jedinak (c)	(yellow card) 66'
RM	10	Robbie Kruse	(yellow card) 68'	(substituted off) 71'
CM	21	Massimo Luongo
LM	7	Mathew Leckie
CF	4	Tim Cahill		(substituted off) 63'
Substitutes:
FW	9	Tomi Jurić		(substituted on) 63'
MF	14	James Troisi		(substituted on) 71'
MF	17	Matt McKay		(substituted on) 74'
Manager:
Ange Postecoglou

Man of the Match:
Trent Sainsbury (Australia)

Assistant referees:
Reza Sokhandan (Iran)
Mohammad Reza Abolfazli (Iran)
Fourth official:
Fahad Al-Mirdasi (Saudi Arabia)
Fifth official:
Abdulla Al-Shalawi (Saudi Arabia)

Match rules:

- 90 minutes.
- 30 minutes of extra time if necessary.
- Penalty shoot-out if scores still level.
- Twelve named substitutes.
- Maximum of three substitutions.

=== Statistics ===
First half
Statistic	South Korea	Australia
Goals scored	0	1
Total shots	5	3
Shots on target	2	2
Ball possession	43%	57%
Corner kicks	2	1
Fouls committed	7	8
Offsides	2	2
Yellow cards	0	2
Red cards	0	0

Second half
Statistic	South Korea	Australia
Goals scored	1	0
Total shots	6	5
Shots on target	5	3
Ball possession	50%	50%
Corner kicks	1	1
Fouls committed	11	13
Offsides	3	0
Yellow cards	0	3
Red cards	0	0

Extra time
Statistic	South Korea	Australia
Goals scored	0	1
Total shots	1	4
Shots on target	1	2
Ball possession	40%	60%
Corner kicks	0	0
Fouls committed	1	5
Offsides	4	2
Yellow cards	0	0
Red cards	0	0

Overall
Statistic	South Korea	Australia
Goals scored	1	2
Total shots	16	12
Shots on target	8	7
Ball possession	46%	54%
Corner kicks	3	2
Fouls committed	19	26
Offsides	9	4
Yellow cards	0	5
Red cards	0	0

== Aftermath ==
The win meant that Australia became the first-ever nation to win in two continental competitions, having won four OFC Nations Cup before moving to the AFC in 2006, and also gave Australia its first Asian title. For this achievement, Australia went on to represent Asia in the 2017 FIFA Confederations Cup held in Russia, its fourth participation but the first and only participation in the tournament as an AFC member after new FIFA President Gianni Infantino decided to abolish it in 2018. Ange Postecoglou also became the first manager since Saudi Arabia's Khalil Al-Zayani (in 1984) to lead his own country to glory at the AFC Asian Cup.

For the South Koreans, this disheartening loss to Australia extended the country's Asian Cup drought. Since winning it at home in 1960, South Korea has made appearances in three other Asian Cup Finals before this one, and all ended up South Korea losing. It was also the last game for veteran Cha Du-ri, who retired from international football following the end of the match.

Nonetheless, Son Heung-min's bright performance throughout the competition made him attractive to major giants in Europe, which led him to transfer from Bayer 04 Leverkusen to Tottenham. With £22 million, he became the most expensive player in Asian football history.

== Notable guests and television viewers ==
Australian Prime Minister Tony Abbott was invited to attend but did not due to vote counting for the 2015 Queensland state election taking place at the same time. Abbott had already attended the opening match of the tournament between Australia and Kuwait in Melbourne. Other invited guests present for the final include FIFA President Sepp Blatter, AFC President Salman Al-Khalifa and Chairman of Football Federation Australia Frank Lowy. Blatter and Al-Khalifa delivered the trophy to the champions in the awards ceremony, amidst boos from the crowd.

The match was broadcast live in Australia by the ABC and Fox Sports. The ABC's coverage of the match averaged 1.8 million viewers nationally for the entire match, with a total reach of 5.3 million Australians overall. The ABC' peak audience was 3 million viewers watching at 22:27 AEDT, in the final minute of extra time. The game also averaged 416,000 for Fox Sports' coverage.
