= List of Budafoki MTE managers =

Budafoki Munkás Testedző Egyesület is a professional football club based in Budapest, Hungary.

== List of managers ==
- (Hungary) István Szeder: ?–1952
- (Hungary) János Steiner: 1952
- (Hungary) Ignác Molnár 1953
- (Hungary) Lajos Szollár: 1953–1958
- (Hungary) Ferenc Rudas: 1958–1959
- (Hungary) István Turai: 1959
- (Hungary) Béla Marosvári: 1960–1963
- (Hungary) Bánáti Rezső 1963–1967
- (Hungary) Lajos Csordás 1967–1968
- (Hungary) Sándor Haász: 1968
- (Hungary) Károly Schneider: 1968
- (Hungary) Lajos Szollár: 1968–1971
- (Hungary) Kálmán Mészöly: 1971
- (Hungary) Gyula Dobesch: 1972–1974
- (Hungary) Kálmán Mészöly: 1974–1976
- (Hungary) Gyula Dobesch: 1976–1984
- (Hungary) Győző Megyeri: 1984–1987
- (Hungary) Gyula Dobesch: 1987–1989
- (Hungary) Lőrinc Sárközi: 1989–1993
- (Hungary) József Gáspár: 1993–1994
- (Hungary) Tamás Krivitz: 1994–1995
- (Hungary) Lőrinc Sárközi: 1995–1996
- (Hungary) György Haffner: 1996–1997
- (Hungary) György Szabó: 1997
- (Hungary) Pál Horváth: 1997–1998
- (Hungary) Lajos Schróth 1998
- (Hungary) Lőrinc Sárközi 1999–2000
- (Hungary) József Gáspár 2000–2002
- (Hungary) László Takács 2003–2004
- (Hungary) Pál Horváth: 2004
- (Hungary) Károly Gelei 2005–2008
- (Hungary) Bálint Tóth 2008–2009
- (Hungary) András Dunay: 2009
- (Hungary) Elemér Piski: 2010
- (Hungary) Tibor Patay: 2011
- (Hungary) Lajos Schróth: 2011–2015
- (Hungary) László Dajka: 2015
- (Hungary) László Prukner: 2015–2017
- (Hungary) Bálint Tóth: 2017
- (Hungary) György Gálhidi: 2017–2018
- (Hungary) Bálint Tóth: 2018
- (Hungary) Zoltán Vitelki: 2018
- (Hungary) Csaba Csizmadia: 2018–
- (Hungary) János Mátyus (23 August 2022–present)
- (Hungary) László Dajka (20 February 2024-21 August 2024)
- (Hungary) Márk Nikházi (interim) (21 August 2024-10 October 2024)
- (Hungary) Márk Nikházi (10 October 2024-18 March 2025)
- (Hungary) Géza Mészöly (18 March 2025-10 November 2025)
