= Tomi Juric =

Australian soccer player (born 1991)

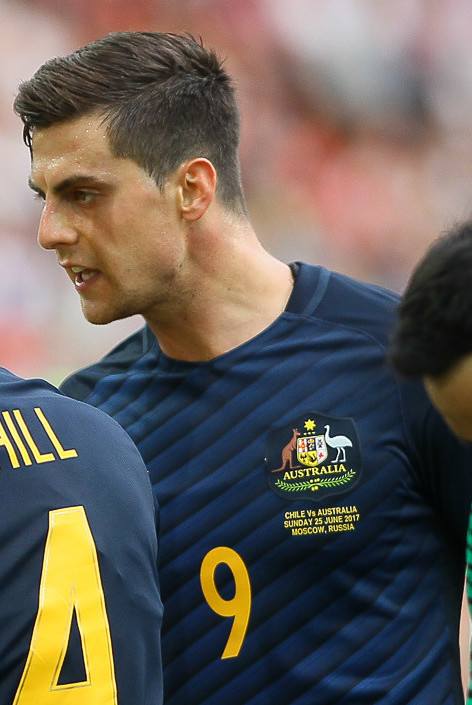
- Juric playing for Australia in 2017

Personal information
- Full name: Tomi Juric
- Date of birth: 22 July 1991 (age 35)
- Place of birth: Auburn, New South Wales, Australia
- Height: 1.91 m (6 ft 3 in)
- Position: Striker

Team information
- Current team: Zrinjski Mostar
- Number: 11

Youth career
- Hurstville Zagreb
- Sydney Olympic
- Sydney United
- 2008–2009: Trnje
- 2009–2010: Croatia Sesvete

Senior career*
Years	Team	Apps	(Gls)
2010–2011	Croatia Sesvete	24	(12)
2011–2012	Lokomotiva	14	(3)
2012–2013	Inter Zaprešić	12	(1)
2013	Adelaide United	7	(2)
2013–2015	Western Sydney Wanderers	34	(12)
2015–2016	Roda JC	17	(4)
2016–2019	FC Luzern	64	(15)
2019–2020	CSKA Sofia	10	(1)
2020–2021	Adelaide United	18	(9)
2021–2022	Macarthur FC	8	(1)
2022–2023	Melbourne Victory	6	(1)
2024	NorthEast United	6	(5)
2024–2026	Koper	29	(13)
2026–	Zrinjski Mostar	9	(4)

International career
2013–2018	Australia	41	(8)
Medal record
Men's football
Representing Australia
AFC Asian Cup
Winner	2015
- * Club domestic league appearances and goals as of 19 September 2026

Tomi Juric (/ˈtɒmi ˈjʊrɪtʃ/ TOM-ee YUR-itch; Croatian: [jǔːritɕ]; born 22 July 1991) is an Australian professional soccer player who plays as a striker for Bosnian Premier League club Zrinjski Mostar.

== Club career ==
=== Adelaide United ===
On 10 February 2013, after spending a number of seasons abroad in Croatia playing for NK Lokomotiva and NK Inter Zaprešić in the Prva HNL, Juric signed a short-term contract to play for Australian club Adelaide United in the A-League. On 16 February 2013, Juric scored on his Adelaide United debut in a 2–1 defeat at Sydney FC.

=== Western Sydney Wanderers ===
On 20 May 2013 Juric signed for Western Sydney Wanderers on a two-year deal, becoming the Wanderers first signing of the A-League off-season. On debut for the Wanderers he scored the equaliser against the Central Coast Mariners in the 1–1 draw on 12 October 2013. Juric scored his first Asian Champions League goal in the Round of 16 against Sanfrecce Hiroshima on 7 May 2014. In a successful first season at Western Sydney, Juric finished with 12 goals in 29 appearances, four of those coming in the 2014 Asian Champions League which his side won, Juric scoring, an amazing goal, the only goal in a 1–0 aggregate win over the Arabian team Al-Hilal.

On 15 January 2015, Juric turned his back on a proposed $10 million move to Chinese Super League side Shanghai Shenhua, opting to chase a move to Europe, where he believed he would have a better chance of staying involved with the Socceroos beyond the 2015 AFC Asian Cup. Juric left the Wanderers on 16 May 2015.

=== Roda JC ===
On 15 August 2015, Juric signed a one-year deal with Eredivisie side Roda JC. He made his Eredivisie debut for Roda JC on 20 September 2015 at the Parkstad Limburg Stadion in Kerkrade against Feyenoord as a 71st-minute substitute for Edwin Gyasi. He was released at the end of the 2015–16 season.

=== FC Luzern ===
On 2 July 2016, despite interest from the Chinese Super League, Juric joined FC Luzern. On his first appearance for Luzern, Juric manage to score a brace. After scoring four goals in seventeen appearances for Luzern, English club Reading FC who were impressed with his ability to hold up play and trouble defences, were reportedly interested in his services. Despite intense interest from England, Juric further endeared himself to the Luzern faithful and stayed. Though injury troubles slowed him down, Juric finished the 2016–17 Swiss Super League season, with 8 goals in 30 appearances.

Despite a second injury hit season in the 2017–18 Swiss Super League, Juric was once again Luzern's second highest goalscorer with seven goals in 27 appearances.

=== CSKA Sofia ===
After his contract with Luzern expired, Juric joined Bulgarian club CSKA Sofia, signing a contract on 27 August 2019. He scored his only goal for the team on 12 September 2020, netting a late equalizer in the 1:1 away draw with Cherno More in a league match. His tenure at the club lasted for a little over a year, as he failed to get many opportunities to reveal his skills, in part due to injury problems. In June 2020, Juric tested positive for COVID-19. On 18 November 2020 the club confirmed that Juric had been released by mutual consent.

=== Return to Adelaide United ===
On 26 November 2020, Juric returned to A-League club Adelaide United. On 19 February 2021, Juric scored a hat-trick consisting of all penalty kicks against the Central Coast Mariners.

=== Macarthur FC ===
Juric signed with Macarthur FC in July 2021.

=== Melbourne Victory ===
Juric signed with Melbourne Victory in June 2022 on a one-year deal, only playing 6 league games scoring 1 time, it was confirmed that he will be leaving in May 2023, at the end of Melbourne Victory's disappointing 2022–23 season.

== International career ==
On 28 June 2013, Juric was called up to the Socceroos training camp on the Central Coast. Juric made his debut for the Socceroos off the bench in the Socceroos' 2013 EAFF East Asian Cup match against South Korea.

Juric was chosen by Ange Postecoglou, the Australian manager, to take part in the 2015 AFC Asian Cup and on 13 January 2015, Juric scored his first Asian Cup goal against Oman, coming off the bench as a substitute for Tim Cahill. He set up the winning goal in the final in extra time for Australia, holding off Korean defenders and pulling off a nutmeg to put a cross through to James Troisi.

In May 2018, he was named in Australia's 23-man squad for the 2018 World Cup in Russia. He replaced Andrew Nabbout in the match against Denmark in the 64th minute after Nabbout dislocated his shoulder, and started against Peru; however, he was unable to score in both games as Australia were eliminated from the tournament in the group stage, and was himself substituted for Tim Cahill in the match against Peru.

== Personal life ==
Juric is of Croatian descent. His father is a Bosnian Croat from Kraljeva Sutjeska and his mother is from Zagreb. His younger brother Deni is also a professional soccer player, currently playing for Polish club Wisła Płock.

== Career statistics ==
=== Club ===
As of match played 19 September 2026

Appearances and goals by club, season and competition
Club	Season	League			National cup (Note: Includes Croatian Cup, Australia Cup, KNVB Cup, Swiss Cup, Bulgarian Cup, Slovenian Cup, Bosnian Cup)		Continental		Total	
Club	Season	Division	Apps	Goals	Apps	Goals	Apps	Goals	Apps	Goals
Croatia Sesvete	2010–11	Second Football League	24	12	0	0	0	0	24	12
Lokomotiva	2011–12	Croatian Football League	14	3	0	0	0	0	14	3
Inter Zaprešić	2012–13	Croatian Football League	12	0	1	0	0	0	13	0
Adelaide United	2012–13	A-League	7	2	0	0	0	0	7	2
Western Sydney Wanderers	2013–14	A-League	20	8	0	0	9 (Note: Appearances in AFC Champions League)	4	29	12
Western Sydney Wanderers	2014–15	A-League	14	4	1	0	7 (Note: Five appearances and one goal in AFC Champions League, two appearances in FIFA Club World Cup)	1	22	5
Western Sydney Wanderers	Total		34	12	1	0	16	5	51	17
Roda JC	2015–16	Eredivisie	17	4	3	3	0	0	20	7
Luzern	2016–17	Swiss Super League	30	8	4	3	1 (Note: Appearance in UEFA Europa League)	0	35	11
Luzern	2017–18	Swiss Super League	27	7	3	0	1	2	31	9
Luzern	2018–19	Swiss Super League	7	0	1	1	0	0	8	1
Luzern	Total		64	15	8	4	2	2	74	21
CSKA Sofia	2019–20	First Professional Football League	7	0	1	0	0	0	8	0
CSKA Sofia	2020–21	First Professional Football League	3	1	1	0	0	0	4	1
CSKA Sofia	Total		10	1	2	0	0	0	12	1
Adelaide United	2020–21	A-League	18	9	0	0	0	0	18	9
Macarthur FC	2021–22	A-League	8	1	1	0	0	0	9	1
Melbourne Victory	2022–23	A-League	6	1	1	0	0	0	7	1
NorthEast United	2023–24	Indian Super League	6	5	0	0	0	0	6	5
Koper	2024–25	Slovenian PrvaLiga	21	12	5	4	–		26	16
Koper	2025–26	Slovenian PrvaLiga	8	1	–		1 (Note: Appearance(s) in UEFA Conference League)	0	9	1
Koper	Total		29	13	5	4	1	0	35	17
Zrinjski Mostar	2025–26	Bosnian Premier League	6	4	3	0	2	0	11	4
Zrinjski Mostar	2026–27	Bosnian Premier League	3	0	0	0	2	0	5	0
Zrinjski Mostar	Total		9	4	3	0	4	0	16	4
Career total			258	82	25	11	23	7	306	100

=== International ===
As of match played 20 November 2018

Appearances and goals by national team and year
National team	Year	Apps	Goals
Australia
Australia	2013	3	1
Australia	2014	2	0
Australia	2015	10	1
Australia	2016	5	2
Australia	2017	12	4
Australia	2018	9	0
Total		41	8

Scores and results list Australia's goal tally first, score column indicates score after each Juric goal.

No	Date	Venue	Opponent	Score	Result	Competition
1	25 July 2013	Hwaseong Stadium, Hwaseong, South Korea	Japan	2–2	2–3	2013 EAFF East Asian Cup
2	13 January 2015	Stadium Australia, Sydney, Australia	Oman	4–0	4–0	2015 AFC Asian Cup
3	1 September 2016	Perth Oval, Perth, Australia	Iraq	2–0	2–0	2018 FIFA World Cup qualification
4	6 October 2016	King Abdullah Sports City, Jeddah, Saudi Arabia	Saudi Arabia	2–1	2–2	2018 FIFA World Cup qualification
5	8 June 2017	Adelaide Oval, Adelaide, Australia	Saudi Arabia	1–0	3–2	2018 FIFA World Cup qualification
6	8 June 2017	Adelaide Oval, Adelaide, Australia	Saudi Arabia	2–1	3–2	2018 FIFA World Cup qualification
7	19 June 2017	Fisht Olympic Stadium, Sochi, Russia	Germany	2–3	2–3	2017 FIFA Confederations Cup
8	5 September 2017	Melbourne Rectangular Stadium, Melbourne, Australia	Thailand	1–0	2–1	2018 FIFA World Cup qualification

== Honours ==
Western Sydney Wanderers

- AFC Champions League: 2014

Australia

- AFC Asian Cup: 2015

Individual

- A-League All Star: 2014
- AFC Champions League Dream Team: 2014
