= József Gáspár =

József Gáspár may refer to:

- Jozef Gašpar
- József Gáspár (footballer, born 1955)
