= Al-Salmiya SC =

Kuwaiti sports club

Al-Salmiya السالمية
- Full name: Al-Salmiya Sporting Club نادي السالمية الرياضي
- Nicknames: Al-Samawi; The Terrible Troublers
- Founded: 1964; 62 years ago
- Ground: Thamir Stadium; Al Salmiya
- Capacity: 20,005
- Chairman: Turki Alyousef Alsabah
- Manager: Ante Miše
- League: Kuwait Premier League
- 2025–26: Kuwait Premier League, 5th of 10
- Website: alsalmiyaclub.com
| Home colours | Away colours |

Al-Salmiya Sporting Club (Arabic: نادي السالمية الرياضي) is a Kuwaiti professional football club in Salmiya. They have won the Kuwaiti Premier League four times, most recently in 2000. They were founded in 1964 and the club covers a total area of 94 thousand square metres comprising ten sports: football, volleyball, table tennis, tennis, squash, fencing, judo, taekwondo, karate and athletics.

== Stadium ==
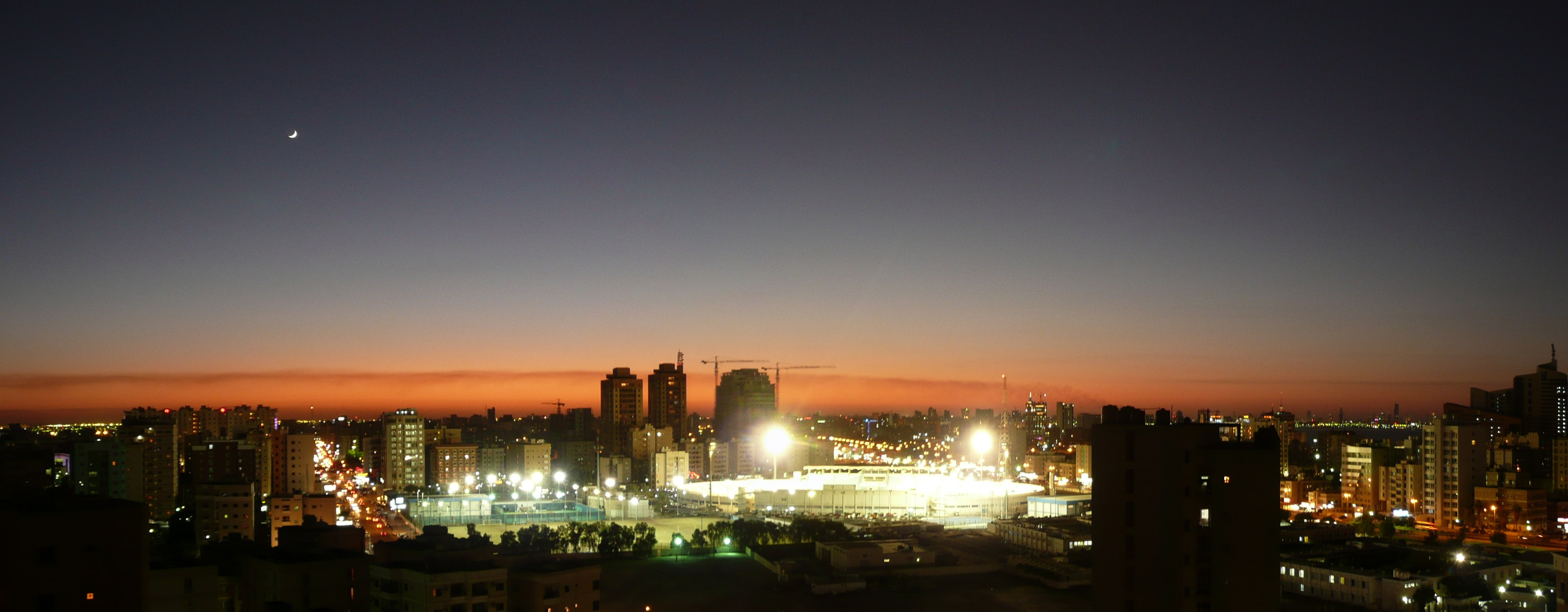
Thamir Stadium at night

Al-Salmiya plays their home games at Thamir Stadium in Salmiya. The stadium was opened in 2004. It has a capacity of 16,105 spectators.

== Crests and colours ==
=== Crests ===
The club crest is inspired by location of Salmiya on the map of Kuwait, with green representing the land, while the color blue represents the sea.

=== Colours ===
Al-Salmiya's home kit is all sky blue shirts and white shorts, while their away kit is all white shirts and sky blue shorts.

== Honours ==
=== Domestic ===
- Kuwait Premier League: 4
  - Winners: 1980–81, 1994–95, 1997–98, 1999–00
- Kuwait Emir Cup: 2
  - Winners: 1992–93, 2000–01
- Kuwait Crown Prince Cup: 2
  - Winners: 2000–01, 2015–16
- Kuwaiti Division One: 1
  - Winners: 1971–72
- Al-Khurafi Cup: 1
  - Winners: 1999–00

=== Regional ===
- GCC Champions League:

Runners-up: 1999

=== Friendly ===
- Brigadiers Cup: 1
  - Winners: 2012–2013 Season

=== Futsal ===
- Kuwaiti futsal league:
  - Winners: 2011–12

=== Handball ===
- Asian Club League Handball Championship: 5
  - Runners-up: 1999, 2001

== Performance in AFC competitions ==
- AFC Champions League: 1 appearance

2005: Group stage

- Asian Club Championship: 3 appearances

1996: Second round
1999: First round
2001: Second round

- Asian Cup Winners Cup: 2 appearances

1994: First Round
2002: Withdrew

== Players ==
=== Current squad ===
Note: Flags indicate national team as defined under FIFA eligibility rules; some limited exceptions apply. Players may hold more than one non-FIFA nationality.

| No. | Pos. | Nation | Player |
|---|---|---|---|
| 1 | GK | KUW | Ali Fadhel |
| 6 | MF | KUW | Ahmed Boumaryoum |
| 7 | FW | TUN | Imed Louati |
| 8 | MF | KUW | Mohamed Al-Huwaidi |
| 10 | MF | KUW | Fawaz Ayedh |
| 11 | MF | KUW | Saif Al Hashan |
| 15 | MF | LBY | Senosi Al Hadi |
| 16 | MF | KUW | Mahdi Dashti |
| 17 | Fw | KUW | Yousef Al Enizan |
| 18 | MF | KUW | Abdulmohsin Al Turkomani |
| 19 | MF | KUW | Muath Al-Enezi |
| 19 | DF | KUW | Abdulaziz Al-Hazza |
| 22 | GK | KUW | Yousef Al Kanadari |
| 23 | DF | GAM | Sang Per Mendy |
| 26 | DF | SYR | Omar Midani |
| 27 | DF | KUW | Essa Waleed |
| 29 | FW | SYR | Mohand Al Mhmeed |
| 33 | DF | KUW | Bader Jamal |
| 35 | GK | KUW | Abdulrahman Al-Fadhli |

| No. | Pos. | Nation | Player |
|---|---|---|---|
| 88 | DF | BRA | Alex Lima |
| — | FW | AUT | Srđan Spiridonović |
| — | DF | JOR | Husam Abu Dahab (on loan from Al-Faisaly) |

=== FIFA World Cup and AFC Asian Cup players ===
FIFA World Cup 1982

- Kuwait
  - Mahboub Juma'a

FIFA World Cup 2006

- Angola
  - André Macanga

1996 AFC Asian Cup

- Kuwait
  - Bashar Abdullah
  - Jassem Al Houwaidi

2000 AFC Asian Cup

- Kuwait
  - Bashar Abdullah
  - Jassem Al Houwaidi
  - Ali Asael
  - Saleh Buraiki
  - Husain Khodari

2004 AFC Asian Cup

- Kuwait
  - Bashar Abdullah
  - Ali Abdulreda
  - Mohammad Al Buraiki
  - Saleh Buraiki
  - Saleh Mehdi

AFC Asian Cup 2007

- Oman
  - Sulaiman Al Shukairi
  - Sultan Al-Touqi

AFC Asian Cup 2011

- Kuwait
  - Hameed Youssef

AFC Asian Cup 2015

- Jordan
  - Odai Al-Saify
- Kuwait
  - Khaled Al-Rashidi
  - Faisal Al Enezi

== Club chairmen ==
| Years | Chairman |
|---|---|
| 1964–65 | (Kuwait) Abdulaziz Mohammed Al Rasheed |
| 1966 | (Kuwait) Jasem Mohammed Al Wogayan |
| 1967–72 | (Kuwait) Abdulaziz Mohammed Al Rasheed |
| 1973–75 | (Kuwait) Ali Subah Al Salem Al Subah |
| 1975–81 | (Kuwait) Mohammed Yousef Al Subah |
| 1981–82 | (Kuwait) Salem Fahad Al Salem Al Subah |
| 1982–08 | (Kuwait) Khaled Yousef Al Subah |
| 2008–11 | (Kuwait) Abdullah Al Tereeji |
| 2012– | (Kuwait) Shiekh Turki Yousef Al-Sabah |

== Former head coaches ==
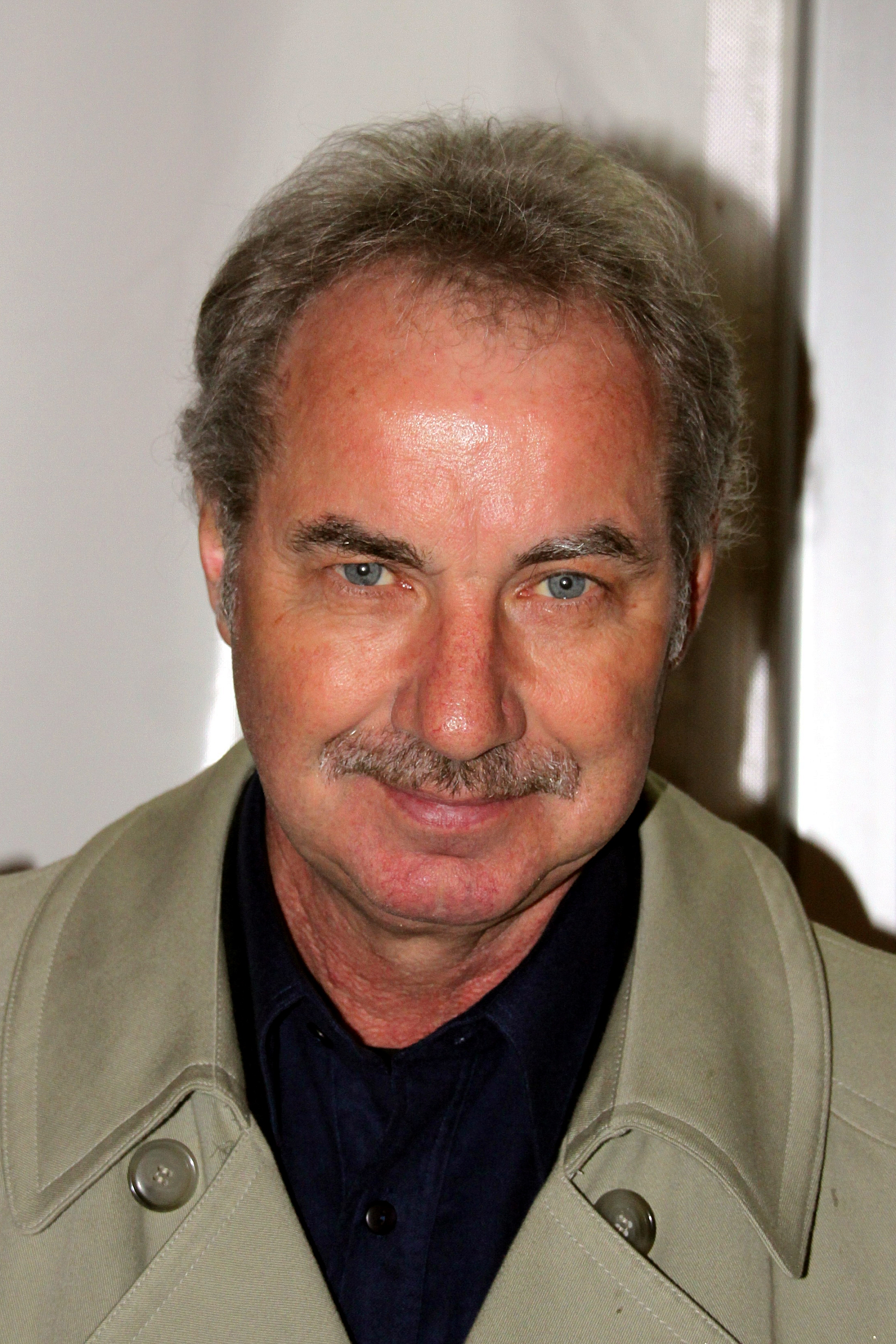
Alfred Riedl managed Salmiya from 2001 to 2003

| Years | Name | Nationality |
|---|---|---|
| 1991–94 | Gildo Rodrigues | (Brazil) |
| 1995–96 | David Roberts | (England) |
| 1996 | Saleh Al Asfoor | (Kuwait) |
| 1998 | Alexandru Moldovan | (Romania) |
| 1999–00 | William Thomas | (Belgium) |
| 2000–01 | Ivan Buljan | (Croatia) |
| 2001 | Adel Abdul Nabi | (Kuwait) |
| 2001–03 | Alfred Riedl | (Austria) |
| 2005–06 | Saleh Al Asfoor | (Kuwait) |
| 2006–07 | Sándor Egervári | (Hungary) |
| 2007–08 | Neca | (Portugal) |
| 2008 | Mohammed Ibrahem | (Kuwait) |
| 2008–09 | Mihai Stoichiţă | (Romania) |
| 2009 | Saleh Zakaria | (Kuwait) |
| 2009–10 | Tamás Krivitz | (Hungary) |
| 2010 | Saleh Zakaria | (Kuwait) |
| 2010–11 | Zijad Švrakić | (Bosnia and Herzegovina) |
| 2011 | Muhammad Karam | (Kuwait) |
| 2011–13 | Sanjin Alagić | (Bosnia and Herzegovina) |
| 2013–14 | Mihai Stoichiţă | (Romania) |
| 2014–17 | Mohammed Dehelees | (Kuwait) |
| 2017–18 | Abdel Aziz Hamada | (Kuwait) |
| 2018–19 | Miloud Hamdi | (Algeria) |
| 2019–20 | Salman Awad | (Kuwait) |
| 2020–2021 | Mohammed Al Mashaan | (Kuwait) |
| 2021 | Thamer Enad | (Kuwait) |
| 2021 | Hatem Al Moadab | (Tunisia) |
| 2021–2023 | Mohammed Ibrahem | (Kuwait) |
| 2023–2024 | Mohammed Al-Mashaan | (Kuwait) |
| 2024– | Ante Miše | (Croatia) |

== See also ==
- List of football clubs in Kuwait
