= Faisal Al Enezi =

Kuwaiti footballer

Personal information
- Full name: Faisal Eid Al Enezi
- Date of birth: 11 June 1988 (age 38)
- Place of birth: Kuwait City, Kuwait
- Position: Forward

Team information
- Current team: Al-Salmiya (Director)

Youth career
- 2007–2010: Qadsia SC

Senior career*
Years	Team	Apps	(Gls)
2011–2024	Al-Salmiya	63	(22)

International career^{‡}
2014–2015	Kuwait	6	(0)
- * Club domestic league appearances and goals ‡ National team caps and goals as of June 11, 2015

Faisal Al Enezi (born 11 June 1988) is a Kuwaiti footballer who plays for Al-Salmiya as a forward.
