= Abdul Salam Al-Mukhaini =

Omani footballer (1988–2025)

Personal information
- Full name: Abdul Salam Amur Juma Al-Mukhaini
- Date of birth: 7 April 1988
- Place of birth: Muscat, Oman
- Date of death: 21 January 2025 (aged 36)
- Place of death: Muscat, Oman
- Height: 1.82 m (6 ft 0 in)
- Position: Centre-back

Senior career*
Years	Team	Apps	(Gls)
2008–2011	Al-Oruba	22	(1)
2011–2014	Al-Raed	30	(1)
2013–2014	→ Baniyas (loan)	24	(0)
2014–2016	Al-Oruba	12	(0)
2015	→ Al-Kuwait (loan)		
2016–2025	Dhofar Club		

International career
2009–2025	Oman	70	(1)
- * Club domestic league appearances and goals

Abdul Salam Amur Juma Al-Mukhaini (Arabic: عبدالسلام بن عامر المخيني; 7 April 1988 – 21 January 2025), commonly known as Abdul Salam Al-Mukhaini, was an Omani professional footballer who played as a centre-back.

== Club career ==
On 8 June 2013, Al-Mukhaini moved to the UAE Pro League club Baniyas SC from Saudi Professional League side Al-Raed on a one-year loan deal.

On 27 August 2014, he signed a one-year contract with his first club Al-Oruba SC.

On 21 January 2015, he was officially transferred on a four-month loan deal from Al-Oruba SC to Kuwaiti top club, Al-Kuwait SC for the remaining 2014–15 Kuwaiti Premier League season. On 23 January, he arrived in Kuwait to complete his medical. He took part in his very first training session with the Kuwaiti club on 24th of the same month. On 25 January, he signed a four-month contract with Kuwait SC.

== International career ==
Al-Mukhaini was a part of the first squad of the Oman national team. He was selected for the national team for the first time in 2010. He made his first appearance for Oman on 20 January 2010 in a friendly match against Sweden. He made appearances in the 2011 AFC Asian Cup qualification, the 2014 FIFA World Cup qualification, the 21st Arabian Gulf Cup and the 2015 AFC Asian Cup qualification.

== Death ==
Al-Mukhaini died in Muscat on 21 January 2025, at the age of 36.

== Career statistics ==
=== Club ===
Appearances and goals by club, season and competition
Club	Season	League			Cup		Continental (Note: Includes appearances in the AFC Champions League and AFC Cup.)		Other		Total	
Club	Season	Division	Apps	Goals	Apps	Goals	Apps	Goals	Apps	Goals	Apps	Goals
Al-Oruba	2010–11	Omani League		1		0	5	0	0	0		1
Al-Raed	2011–12	Saudi Professional League	7	0	0	0	0	0	0	0	7	0
Al-Raed	2012–13	Saudi Professional League	23	1	4	0	0	0	0	0	27	1
Al-Raed	Total		30	1	4	0	0	0	0	0	30	1
Baniyas (loan)	2013–14	UAE Arabian Gulf League	24	0	3	0	1	0	0	0	27	0
Al-Kuwait (loan)	2014–15	Kuwaiti Premier League		0		0	6	0	0	0		0
Career total				2		0	12	0	0	0		2

=== International ===
Score and result list Oman's goal tally first, score column indicates score after Al-Mukhaini goal.

International goal scored by Abdul Salam Al-Mukhaini
No.	Date	Venue	Opponent	Score	Result	Competition
1	22 May 2013	Sultan Qaboos Sports Complex, Muscat, Oman	Iran	2–0	3–1	Friendly

== Honours ==
Al-Oruba

- Omani League runner-up: 2010–11
- Sultan Qaboos Cup: 2010
- Oman Super Cup: 2008, 2011

Al-Kuwait

- Kuwaiti Premier League: 2014–15
- Crown Prince Cup runner-up: 2014–15
- Kuwait Federation Cup: 2014–15
