= James Troisi =

Australian soccer player (born 1988)

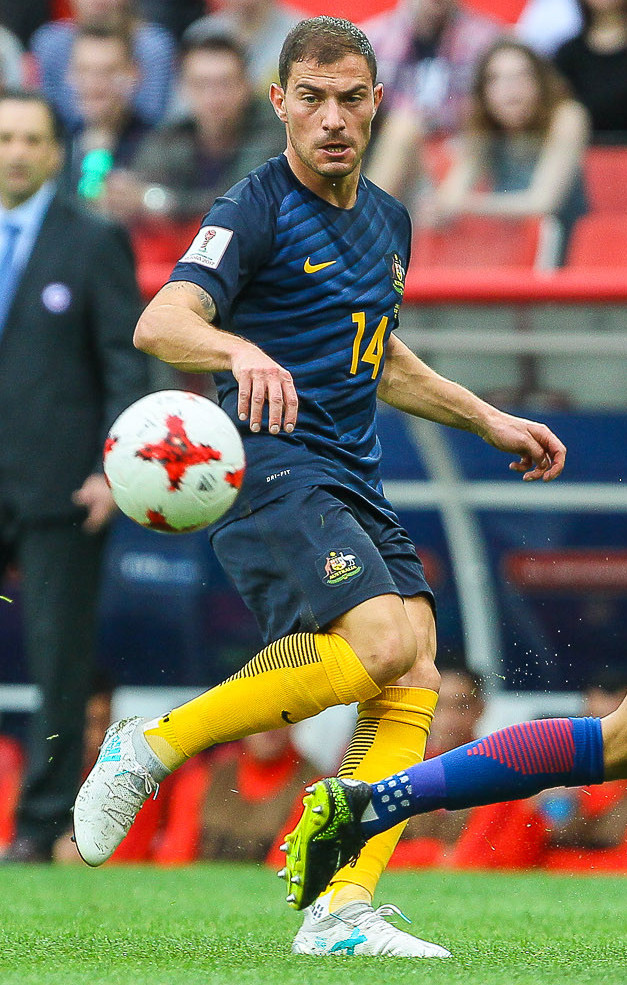
- Troisi with Australia at the 2017 FIFA Confederations Cup

Personal information
- Full name: James Troisi
- Date of birth: 3 July 1988 (age 38)
- Place of birth: Rose Park, South Australia, Australia
- Height: 1.76 m (5 ft 9 in)
- Positions: Attacking midfielder; winger

Youth career
- MetroStars
- West Adelaide
- 1999–2001: West Torrens Birkalla
- 2001–2005: Adelaide City
- 2005–2007: Newcastle United

Senior career*
Years	Team	Apps	(Gls)
2007–2008	Newcastle United	0	(0)
2008–2009	Gençlerbirliği	29	(6)
2009–2012	Kayserispor	64	(10)
2012–2014	Atalanta	6	(0)
2013–2014	→ Melbourne Victory (loan)	29	(12)
2014–2015	Juventus	0	(0)
2014–2015	→ Zulte Waregem (loan)	21	(5)
2015	→ Al-Ittihad (loan)	8	(1)
2016	Liaoning Whowin	3	(0)
2016–2019	Melbourne Victory	76	(15)
2019–2020	Adelaide United	13	(1)
2020–2022	Western Sydney Wanderers	41	(5)
2022–2023	Western United	18	(0)

International career^{‡}
2007–2008	Australia U23	13	(2)
2008–2018	Australia	37	(5)
Medal record
Representing Australia
AFC Asian Cup
Winner	2015 Australia
- * Club domestic league appearances and goals as of 2 May 2023 ‡ National team caps and goals as of 28 March 2018

James Troisi (/ˈtrɔɪsi/ TROY-see; born 3 July 1988) is a former Australian professional soccer player who plays as an attacking midfielder or winger.

== Early life ==
Troisi was born in Rose Park, a suburb of Adelaide, South Australia, to Greek parents. His stepfather is Italian.

He signed his first professional contract with Newcastle United on 10 January 2007, keeping him at the club until June 2008. He did not make a first team appearance during his time at Newcastle, although he did feature on the bench for the first team in both Premier League and UEFA Cup matches.

== Club career ==
=== Newcastle United ===
He was on the fringes of Newcastle's senior side for the 2007–08 Premier League season and showed promising signs in pre-season friendlies, including getting two assists against Hartlepool United.

In January 2008, Troisi had a two match trial with Dutch Eredivisie club, Roda JC. Roda wanted to sign him on a permanent basis, but negotiations broke down as Troisi was a product of Newcastle's youth development and still under 23 years of age, so Newcastle would have required a compensation fee.

On 6 May 2008, it was announced that Troisi would leave Newcastle United after the end of the 2007–08 season.

=== Gençlerbirliği ===
He joined Gençlerbirliği at the end of August 2008 on a three-year contract. He made his debut for Gençlerbirliği S.K. on 14 September 2008 against Eskisehirspor at the 19 Mayis Stadium in Ankara, coming on as a 65th-minute substitute for Engin Baytar.

=== Kayserispor ===
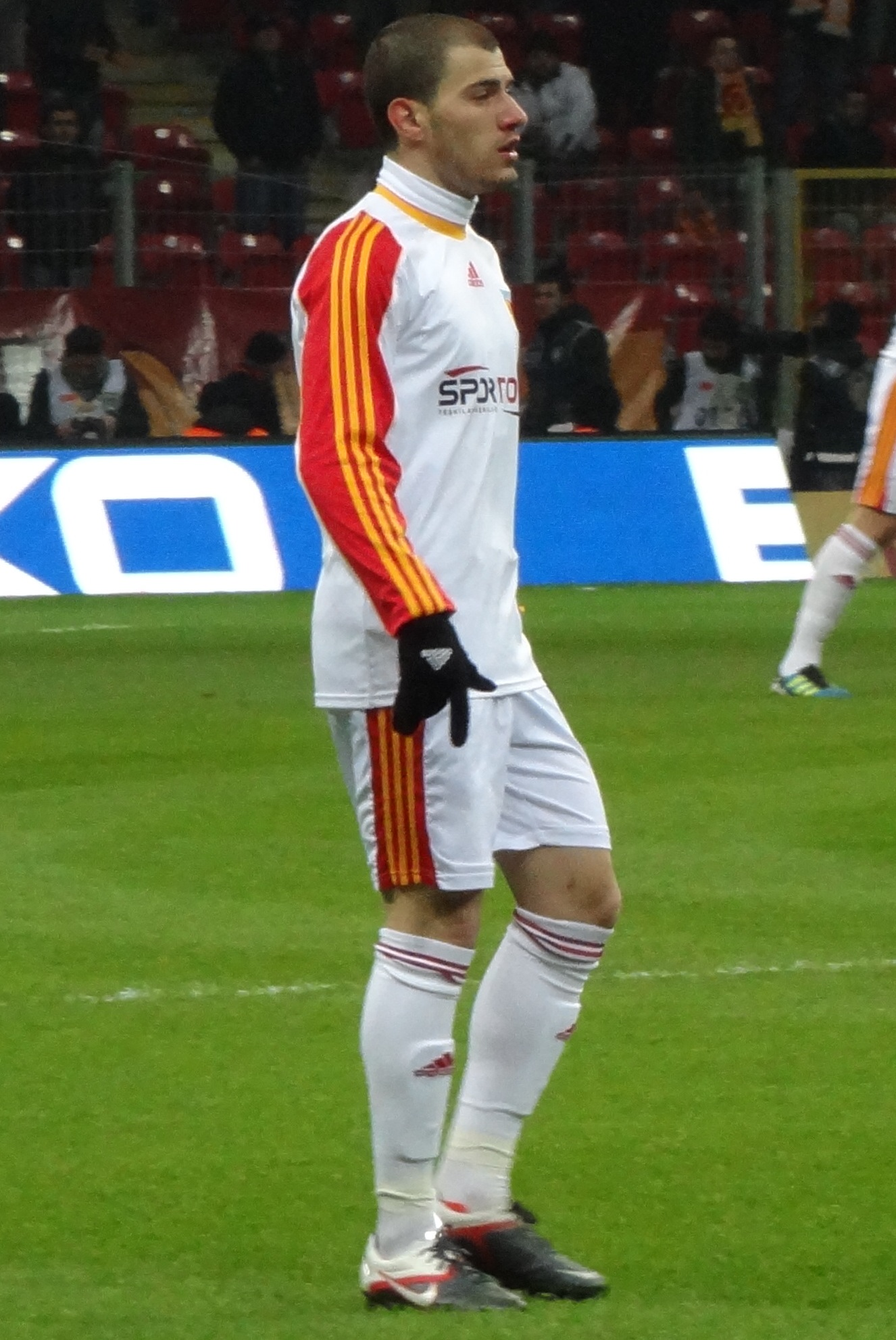
Troisi in 2012

On 24 January, Troisi put mid-table Kayserispor to the sword with his first career hat-trick scoring all of Genclerbirligi goals in a 3–1 win.

In July 2009, he joined Kayserispor on a four-year contract.

=== Atalanta ===
On 22 August 2012 Juventus signed him as free agent on a four-year contract, but half of the registration rights were sold to Atalanta for €2 million as part of Manolo Gabbiadini's deal on 24 August 2012.

In 2013, Norwich City manager Chris Hughton confirmed in a press conference that the club had made an enquiry into his availability.

==== Loan to Melbourne Victory ====
On 24 September 2013, Troisi was loaned to Melbourne Victory on a one-year deal. He made his A-League debut against Melbourne Heart in Round 1 of the competition's ninth season. He scored his first goal for Melbourne in a 2–2 draw against Adelaide United.

His second goal for Melbourne was in front of the home fans at Etihad Stadium in a 1–0 win over Brisbane Roar on 25 October 2013, thanks to an Archie Thompson through ball pass. He scored two goals against Wellington Phoenix in a 3–2 win, and his fifth came from a free kick against Sydney FC in a 2–3 loss.

He scored 12 goals in the A-League and 3 in the Asian Champions League.

=== Juventus ===
On 20 June 2014, Juventus announced that they had secured full ownership of Troisi's contract from Atalanta for €1 million, with the remaining 50% registration rights of Prince-Désir Gouano moved to Atalanta also for €1 million.

==== Loan to Zulte Waregem ====
On 30 August 2014, Troisi joined Belgian Pro League club Zulte Waregem on a one-year deal, after being deemed surplus to requirements at Juventus.

Troisi featured in over twenty Pro League matches, scoring five goals in the process, including a memorable long range strike against Club Brugge, chipping his Socceroos teammate goalkeeper Mathew Ryan.

==== Loan to Ittihad ====
On 31 August 2015, Troisi was loaned to Saudi Arabian club Al-Ittihad.

However, his stay was cut short. Troisi subsequently terminated the contract. It was reported that Ittihad failed to pay the wage in time and the player lodged a claim with the FIFA Dispute Resolution Chamber, which was accepted. The further appeals of both the club and the player to the Court of Arbitration for Sport had confirmed the club had to pay Troisi the remaining wage.

=== Liaoning Hongyun ===
Despite reported interest from A-League clubs, including his hometown club Adelaide United and Melbourne Victory, on 29 January 2016, Troisi signed with Chinese Super League side Liaoning Whowin joining fellow countryman Michael Thwaite. Six months into his 11-month contract, following the signing of Dario Vidošić, Troisi was deemed unneeded at Liaoning Whowin and parted with the club.

=== Melbourne Victory ===
On 1 August 2016, after his release from Liaoning Whowin, Troisi returned to the A-League again, signing a one-year deal with Melbourne Victory. On 26 July 2017, James Troisi re-signed with Melbourne Victory for two years.

=== Adelaide United ===
After choosing not to re-sign with Melbourne Victory, on 5 October 2019, Troisi signed a two-year deal with his hometown club Adelaide United. Prior to the start of the 2020–21 A-League season Adelaide United gave Troisi permission to speak with other clubs. Bruce Djite, speaking for the club, claimed that following an improvement in the club's financial situation following other player sales, they notified Troisi that he is a required player and were therefore disappointed when Troisi requested to terminate his contract two weeks before the beginning of the season. Troisi later spoke out in the sports media to say he was not informed of that change in status. Following the disagreement, his playing contract was mutually terminated in December 2020, leaving him free to join a new club.

=== Western Sydney Wanderers ===
Following leaving Adelaide United, Troisi signed a two-year deal with Western Sydney Wanderers. Troisi spent those two seasons at the club, making 43 appearances in all competitions, before being released at the end of his contract.

=== Western United ===
On 17 July 2022, Troisi signed a one-year deal with Western United. Troisi made 18 appearances for Western United, before departing at the end of his one year contract.

== International career ==
=== U23 ===
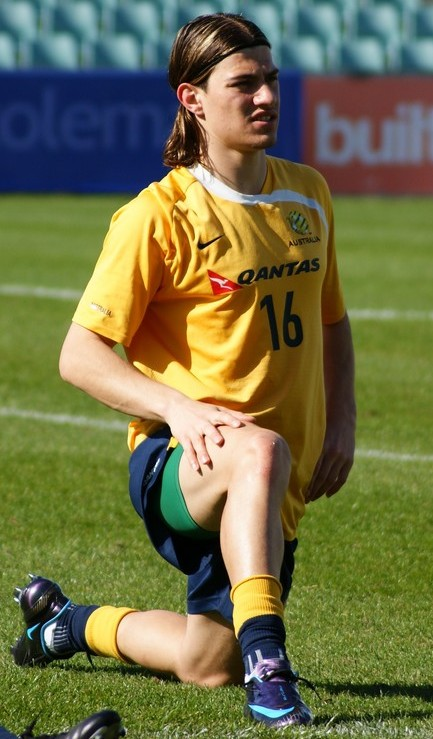
James Troisi with the Australian national team.

After a successful 2006–07 season with the Newcastle reserve side, Troisi made his debut for the Australia U23 team (the "Olyroos"), on 18 April 2007 against Saudi Arabia in an Olympic qualifier. He followed up a good performance against the Saudis with a goal in the all-important clash with Iran in his hometown of Adelaide.

=== Senior ===
Troisi made his full international debut for Australia in a goalless friendly against Singapore on 22 March 2008, playing in left midfield.

Ange Postecoglou included Troisi in the Australia squad for the 2014 FIFA World Cup.

Troisi was named as part of Australia's 2015 AFC Asian Cup squad. He started Australia's first match of the tournament against Kuwait, scoring Australia's fourth and final goal of the match in the 92nd minute of the match, helping Australia to a 4–1 win. Troisi played for Australia in the 2015 AFC Asian Cup Final against South Korea, coming on as a second-half substitute for Robbie Kruse. He scored Australia's second goal of the match in the first period of extra time, the winning goal of the Asian Cup Final.

He was selected in Australia's squad for the 2017 FIFA Confederations Cup. He scored against Chile, and was awarded FIFA Man of the Match.

In May 2018, he was named in Australia's preliminary 26-man squad for the 2018 World Cup in Russia.

== Career statistics ==
=== Club ===
As of match played 21 May 2022

Appearances and goals by club, season and competition
Club	Season	Division	League		National Cup		Continental		Total	
Club	Season	Division	Apps	Goals	Apps	Goals	Apps	Goals	Apps	Goals
Gençlerbirliği	2008–09	Süper Lig	29	6	1	0	—		30	6
Kayserispor	2009–10	Süper Lig	24	0	1	0	—		25	0
Kayserispor	2010–11	Süper Lig	14	0	0	0	—		14	0
Kayserispor	2011–12	Süper Lig	26	10	2	1	—		28	11
Kayserispor	Total		64	10	3	1	—		67	11
Atalanta	2012–13	Serie A	6	0	2	0	—		8	0
Melbourne Victory (loan)	2013–14	A-League	29	12	—		6	3	35	15
Zulte Waregem (loan)	2014–15	Belgian Pro League	21	5	2	0	—		23	5
Al-Ittihad	2015–16	Saudi Professional League	8	0	2	1	—		10	1
Liaoning Whowin	2016	Chinese Super League	3	0	0	0	—		3	0
Melbourne Victory	2016–17	A-League	26	6	2	1	—		28	7
Melbourne Victory	2017–18	A-League	25	6	2	1	5	0	32	7
Melbourne Victory	2018–19	A-League	25	5	2	0	4	0	31	5
Melbourne Victory	Total		76	17	6	2	9	0	91	19
Adelaide United	2019–20	A-League	13	1	0	0	—		13	1
Western Sydney Wanderers	2020–21	A-League	24	4	0	0	—		24	4
Western Sydney Wanderers	2021–22	A-League Men	17	1	2	0	—		19	1
Western Sydney Wanderers	Total		41	5	2	0	0	0	43	5
Career total			290	56	18	4	15	3	323	63

=== International ===
As of match played 27 Match 2018

Appearances and goals by national team and year
National team	Year	Apps	Goals
Australia	2008	3	0
Australia	2011	5	1
Australia	2012	1	0
Australia	2014	7	0
Australia	2015	10	3
Australia	2017	10	1
Australia	2018	1	0
Total		37	5

Scores and results list Australia's goal tally first.

No	Date	Venue	Opponent	Score	Result	Competition
1.	5 June 2011	Adelaide Oval, Adelaide, Australia	New Zealand	3–0	3–0	Friendly
2.	9 January 2015	Melbourne Rectangular Stadium, Melbourne, Australia	Kuwait	4–1	4–1	2015 AFC Asian Cup
3.	31 January 2015	Stadium Australia, Sydney, Australia	South Korea	2–1	2–1 (a.e.t.)	2015 AFC Asian Cup
4.	25 March 2015	Fritz-Walter-Stadion, Kaiserslautern, Germany	Germany	1–1	2–2	Friendly
5.	25 June 2017	Otkrytiye Arena, Moscow, Russia	Chile	1–0	1–1	2017 FIFA Confederations Cup

== Honours ==
Melbourne Victory

- A-League Grand Final: 2018

Australia

- AFC Asian Cup: 2015
