= Mohammed Al-Siyabi =

Omani footballer (born 1988)

Personal information
- Full name: Mohammed Ali Humaid Al-Siyabi
- Date of birth: 21 December 1988 (age 37)
- Place of birth: Barka, Oman
- Position: Right attacking midfielder

Team information
- Current team: Oman
- Number: 99

Youth career
- 2009–2012: Al-Shabab

Senior career*
Years	Team	Apps	(Gls)
2009–2015	Al-Shabab	77	(10)
2015–2017	Al-Nahda		
2017–2019	Al-Shabab		
2019–2021	Sohar		
2021–	Oman		

International career
2012–2015	Oman	26	(3)
- * Club domestic league appearances and goals

Mohammed Ali Humaid Al-Siyabi (Arabic: محمد بن علي السيابي; born 21 December 1988), commonly known as Mohammed Al-Siyabi, is an Omani footballer who plays for Oman Club.

== Club career ==
On 8 July 2014, he agreed a one-year contract extension with Al-Shabab Club.

=== Club career statistics ===
Club	Season	Division	League		Cup		Continental		Other (Note: Includes goals in the GCC Champions League and Al Ain FC International Championship)		Total	
Club	Season	Division	Apps	Goals	Apps	Goals	Apps	Goals	Apps	Goals	Apps	Goals
Al-Shabab	2009–10	Oman Professional League	-	3	-	0	0	0	-	1	-	4
Al-Shabab	2010–11	Oman Professional League	-	1	-	0	0	0	-	0	-	1
Al-Shabab	2011–12	Oman Professional League	-	3	-	1	0	0	-	0	-	4
Al-Shabab	2012–13	Oman Professional League	-	4	-	2	0	0	-	1	-	7
Al-Shabab	2013–14	Oman Professional League	-	3	-	0	0	0	-	0	-	3
Al-Shabab	2014–15	Oman Professional League	-	1	-	0	0	0	-	0	-	1
Al-Shabab	Total		-	15	-	3	0	0	-	2	-	20
Career total			-	15	-	3	0	0	-	2	-	20

== International career ==
Mohammed is part of the first team squad of the Oman national football team. He was selected for the national team for the first time in 2011. He made his first appearance for Oman on 8 December 2012 against Lebanon in the 2012 WAFF Championship. He has made appearances in the 2012 WAFF Championship, the 2014 FIFA World Cup qualification and the 2015 AFC Asian Cup qualification.

== National team career statistics ==
=== Goals for Senior National Team ===
Scores and results list Oman's goal tally first.

#	Date	Venue	Opponent	Score	Result	Competition
1	14 December 2012	Ali Sabah Al-Salem Stadium, Al Farwaniyah, Kuwait City, Kuwait	Palestine	1–0	2–1	2012 WAFF Championship
2	10 October 2014	Sohar Regional Sports Complex, Sohar, Oman	Costa Rica	2–4	3–4	Friendly
3	3 January 2015	Campbelltown Stadium, New South Wales, Australia	China	1–0	1–4	Friendly

== Honours ==
=== Club ===
- With Al-Shabab

- Omani League Runner-up: 2011–12
