= Lee Jeong-hyeop =

South Korean footballer (born 1991)

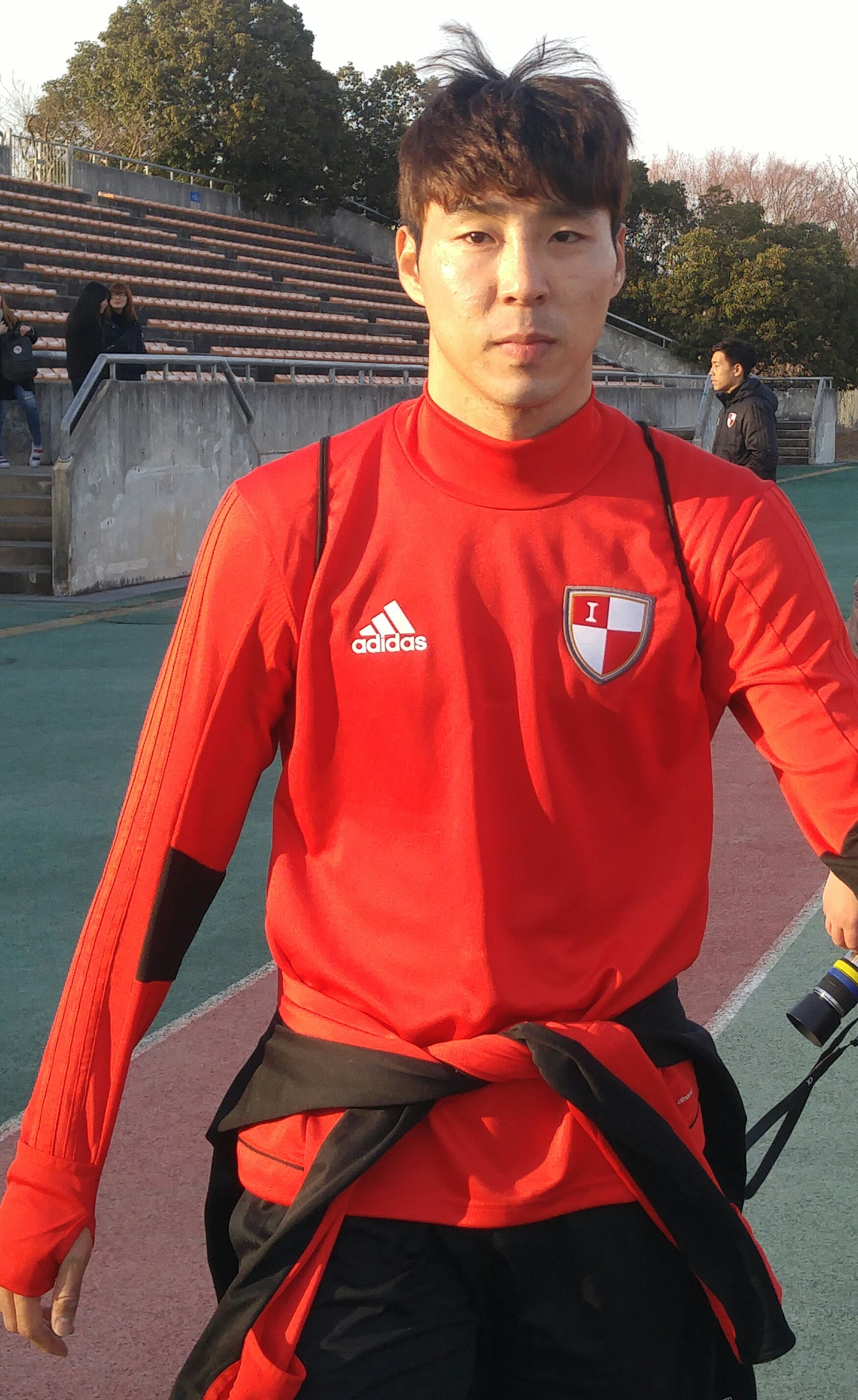

Personal information
- Date of birth: 24 June 1991 (age 35)
- Place of birth: Busan, South Korea
- Height: 1.88 m (6 ft 2 in)
- Position: Striker

Team information
- Current team: PT Prachuap
- Number: 9

Youth career
- 2007–2009: Busan IPark
- 2010–2012: Soongsil University

Senior career*
| Years | Team | Apps | (Gls) |
| 2013–2020 | Busan IPark | 109 | (31) |
| 2014–2015 | → Sangju Sangmu (army) | 42 | (11) |
| 2016 | → Ulsan Hyundai (loan) | 30 | (4) |
| 2018 | → Shonan Bellmare (loan) | 18 | (2) |
| 2021 | Gyeongnam FC | 14 | (1) |
| 2021–2023 | Gangwon FC | 67 | (8) |
| 2024 | Seongnam FC | 22 | (0) |
| 2025 | Cheonan City | 30 | (5) |
| 2026– | PT Prachuap | 13 | (1) |

International career^{‡}
| 2015–2021 | South Korea | 25 | (5) |
Medal record
Men's football
Representing South Korea
AFC Asian Cup
| Runner-up | 2015 Australia |
- * Club domestic league appearances and goals as of 3 May 2026 ‡ National team caps and goals as of 25 March 2021

- Lee Jeong-hyeop
- Hangul: 이정협
- Hanja: 李庭協
- RR: I Jeonghyeop
- MR: I Chŏnghyŏp

Lee Jeong-hyeop (Korean: 이정협; Korean pronunciation: [i.dʑʌŋ.ɦjʌp̚] or [i] [tɕʌŋ.ɦjʌp̚]; born 24 June 1991) is a South Korean footballer who plays as striker for PT Prachuap in the Thai League 1.

== Career ==
Lee Jung-hyeop joined Busan IPark in 2013 and made his debut on March 10 in a match against Gyeongnam FC. On June 1, he scored his debut goal and a second goal in the same match, leading his team to a victory over Jeonbuk Hyundai Motors. During his debut season, he appeared in 27 league matches, scoring 2 goals and providing 2 assists. Afterward, he changed his name from Lee Jeong-gi to Lee Jung-hyeop and, at the suggestion of manager Yoon Sung-hyo, applied to join the military team Sangju Sangmu FC, enlisting in November 2013.

After completing his military service with Sangju Sangmu FC in October 2015, Lee returned to his original club, Busan, but only appeared in three matches due to injury. He was unable to participate in the promotion playoffs and could only watch as Busan was relegated.

At the end of the 2015 season, Lee expressed a strong desire to continue playing in the K League Classic, leading to a loan move to Ulsan Hyundai FC as part of a trade with Lee Young-jae. He scored his first goal for Ulsan on April 9, 2016, in a match against Gwangju FC and later scored a dramatic stoppage-time goal on September 21, 2016, in a match against Seongnam FC, securing a 2-1 comeback victory and confirming Ulsan's place in the top split.

After the 2016 season, Lee returned to Busan following the expiration of his one-year loan with Ulsan.

On March 4, he scored in the league opener against Seongnam FC and continued his scoring streak in all matches except the game against Bucheon FC 1995, for which he was unavailable due to national team duties. On April 15, he scored in his sixth consecutive league match during a game against Suwon FC, tying the record for most consecutive goals after a season opener set by Adriano while playing for Daejeon Citizen. A week later, on April 22, he broke Adriano's record by scoring the first goal in a match against Daejeon.

On January 22, 2018, it was officially announced that Lee had joined Shonan Bellmare of the J1 League on a one-year loan.

Lee returned to Busan ahead of the 2019 season and scored two goals in a 5-2 victory against Asan Mugunghwa FC on April 13. He contributed 13 goals in 31 matches during the 2019 season, helping his team earn promotion. Lee remained with Busan for the 2020 season and scored his first goal of the season on May 24 in a match against Ulsan Hyundai FC.

Ahead of the 2021 season, Lee transferred to Gyeongnam FC. In the summer transfer window of the same year, he moved to Gangwon FC in K League 1 to strengthen their attacking options.

== International career ==
In December 2014, Lee was surprisingly included in South Korea's squad for the 2015 AFC Asian Cup as an uncapped player. He made his debut for the Taegeuk Warriors in a pre-tournament friendly against Saudi Arabia, scoring his first international goal as the Koreans ran out 2–0 winners. In South Korea's final group game, Lee scored the winning goal against tournament hosts Australia to secure first place in Group A. On 26 January 2015, Lee scored the opening goal of South Korea's 2–0 semi-final defeat of Iraq to put the nation into the Asian Cup final for the first time since 1988.

== Career statistics ==
=== Club ===
As of 19 March 2022

| Club performance | | | League | | Cup | | League Cup | | Play-offs | | Total | |
| Season | Club | League | Apps | Goals | Apps | Goals | Apps | Goals | Apps | Goals | Apps | Goals |
|---|---|---|---|---|---|---|---|---|---|---|---|---|
| 2013 | Busan IPark | K League 1 | 27 | 2 | 2 | 0 | — | | — | | 29 | 2 |
| 2014 | Sangju Sangmu (army) | K League 1 | 25 | 4 | 2 | 0 | — | | — | | 27 | 4 |
| 2015 | Sangju Sangmu (army) | K League 2 | 17 | 7 | 0 | 0 | — | | — | | 17 | 7 |
| 2015 | Busan IPark | K League 1 | 3 | 0 | 0 | 0 | — | | — | | 3 | 0 |
| 2016 | Ulsan Hyundai (loan) | K League 1 | 30 | 4 | 2 | 0 | — | | — | | 32 | 4 |
| 2017 | Busan IPark | K League 2 | 26 | 10 | 2 | 1 | — | | 2 | 0 | 30 | 11 |
| 2018 | Shonan Bellmare (loan) | J1 League | 18 | 2 | 0 | 0 | 5 | 0 | — | | 23 | 2 |
| 2019 | Busan IPark | K League 2 | 31 | 13 | 1 | 0 | — | | 2 | 0 | 34 | 13 |
| 2020 | Busan IPark | K League 1 | 22 | 6 | 1 | 0 | — | | — | | 23 | 6 |
| 2021 | Gyeongnam FC | K League 2 | 14 | 1 | 1 | 2 | — | | — | | 15 | 3 |
| 2021 | Gangwon FC | K League 1 | 18 | 1 | 2 | 0 | — | | 2 | 0 | 22 | 1 |
| 2022 | Gangwon FC | K League 1 | 6 | 0 | 0 | 0 | — | | — | | 6 | 0 |
| Career total | | | 237 | 50 | 13 | 3 | 5 | 0 | 6 | 0 | 261 | 53 |

=== International goals ===
Results list South Korea's goal tally first.

| # | Date | Venue | Opponent | Score | Result | Competition |
|---|---|---|---|---|---|---|
| 1. | 17 January 2015 | Brisbane Stadium, Brisbane | Australia | 1–0 | 1–0 | 2015 AFC Asian Cup |
| 2. | 26 January 2015 | Stadium Australia, Sydney | Iraq | 1–0 | 2–0 | 2015 AFC Asian Cup |
| 3. | 11 June 2015 | Shah Alam Stadium, Kuala Lumpur | United Arab Emirates | 3–0 | 3–0 | Friendly |
| 4. | 24 March 2016 | Ansan Wa~ Stadium, Ansan | Lebanon | 1–0 | 1–0 | 2018 FIFA World Cup qualification |
| 5. | 11 November 2016 | Cheonan Stadium, Cheonan | Canada | 2–0 | 2–0 | Friendly |

== Honours ==
=== Club ===
Busan IPark

- Korean FA Cup runner-up: 2017

Sangju Sangmu

- K League 2: 2015

=== International ===
South Korea

- EAFF East Asian Cup : 2015, 2017, 2019
- AFC Asian Cup runner-up: 2015

=== Individual ===
- K League 2 Best XI : 2017
