= Tamás Krivitz =

Hungarian footballer

Personal information
- Date of birth: 29 September 1946 (age 80)
- Place of birth: Pécs, Hungary

Team information
- Current team: Defender

Senior career*
Years	Team	Apps	(Gls)
1965–1966	Újpest		
1968	Vancouver Royals		
1969	Kansas City Spurs		
1970–1974	Lierse		
1974–1975	Wuppertaler SV		

Managerial career
- 2009–2010: Al-Salmiya SC
- 2010–2013: Ahli Sidab Club
- * Club domestic league appearances and goals

Tamás Krivitz (born 29 September 1946) is a Hungarian football manager and former player.
