= Jaber Al-Owaisi =

Omani footballer (born 1989)

Personal information
- Full name: Jaber Mohammed Sagheer Al-Owaisi
- Date of birth: 4 November 1989 (age 37)
- Place of birth: Barka, Oman
- Height: 1.77 m (5 ft 10 in)
- Position: Centre-back

Team information
- Current team: Al-Shabab
- Number: 33

Youth career
- 2004–2007: Al-Seeb

Senior career*
Years	Team	Apps	(Gls)
2007–2011	Al-Seeb	56	(3)
2011–	Al-Shabab	61	(3)

International career
2010–2011	Oman U-23	2	(0)
2011–	Oman	29	(3)
- * Club domestic league appearances and goals

Jaber Mohammed Sagheer Al-Owaisi (Arabic: جَابِر مُحَمَّد صَغِير الْعُوَيْسِيّ; born 4 November 1989), commonly known as Jaber Al-Owaisi, is an Omani footballer who plays for Al-Shabab Club in Oman Professional League.

== Club career ==
On 30 July 2013, he signed a one-year contract extension with Al-Shabab Club. On 19 August 2014, he again signed a one-year contract extension with Al-Shabab Club.

=== Club career statistics ===
Club	Season	Division	League		Cup		Continental		Other (Note: Includes goal in the GCC Champions League)		Total	
Club	Season	Division	Apps	Goals	Apps	Goals	Apps	Goals	Apps	Goals	Apps	Goals
Al-Seeb	2008–09	Omani League	-	1	-	0	0	0	-	0	-	1
Al-Seeb	2009–10	Omani League	-	2	-	1	0	0	-	0	-	3
Al-Seeb	Total		-	3	-	1	0	0	-	0	-	4
Al-Shabab	2012–13	Oman Professional League	-	1	-	1	0	0	-	1	-	3
Al-Shabab	2013–14	Oman Professional League	-	2	-	0	0	0	-	0	-	2
Al-Shabab	Total		-	3	-	1	0	0	-	1	-	5
Career total			-	6	-	2	0	0	-	1	-	9

== International career ==
Jaber is part of the first team squad of the Oman national football team. He was selected for the national team for the first time in 2011. He made his first appearance for Oman on 20 January 2010 in a friendly match against Sweden. He has made appearances in the 2012 WAFF Championship, the 2014 FIFA World Cup qualification, 2015 AFC Asian Cup qualification and the 22nd Arabian Gulf Cup and has represented the national team in the 2011 AFC Asian Cup qualification and the 21st Arabian Gulf Cup.

== National team career statistics ==
=== Goals for Senior National Team ===
Scores and results list Oman's goal tally first.

#	Date	Venue	Opponent	Score	Result	Competition
1	15 January 2012	Sultan Qaboos Sports Complex, Muscat, Oman	DR Congo	1–0	2–2	Friendly
2	22 May 2013	Sultan Qaboos Sports Complex, Muscat, Oman	Iran	3–0	3–1	Friendly
3	31 December 2014	AIS Athletic Track, Canberra, Australia	Qatar	2–0	2–2	Friendly

== Honours ==
=== Club ===
- With Al-Shabab

- Omani League Runner-Up: 2011–12
