= Hameed Al-Qallaf =

Kuwaiti footballer

Hameed Youssuf
Personal information
- Full name: Hameed Youssuf Al Qallaf
- Date of birth: 10 August 1987 (age 39)
- Place of birth: Kuwait
- Height: 1.83 m (6 ft 0 in)
- Position: Goalkeeper

Team information
- Current team: Al-Qadsia
- Number: 33

Youth career
- 2000–2005: Al Yarmouk

Senior career*
Years	Team	Apps	(Gls)
2005–2009	Al Yarmouk	35	(0)
2009–2013	Al Salmiya	14	(0)
2011	→ Al Yarmouk (loan)	3	(0)
2012	Saham	3	(0)
2013–2017	Al-Arabi	49	(0)
2017–2022	Al Kuwait	67	(0)
2025–	Al-Qadsia		

International career^{‡}
2006–2019	Kuwait	27	(0)
- * Club domestic league appearances and goals as of 7 September 2019 ‡ National team caps and goals as of 12 May 2022

Hameed Youssef Al-Qallaf (born 10 August 1987) is a Kuwaiti football player who plays for Kuwait SC as goalkeeper.

== Honours ==
=== Al-Arabi ===
- Kuwait Federation Cup: 2013-14
- Kuwait Crown Prince Cup: 2014-15

=== Kuwait SC ===
- Kuwaiti Premier League: 2017-18, 2018-19, 2019-20, 2021-22
- Kuwait Emir Cup: 2017-18, 2018-19, 2020-21, 2021-22
- Kuwait Crown Prince Cup: 2018-19, 2019-20, 2020-21
- Kuwait Super Cup: 2017, 2020, 2022

=== Qadsia ===
- Kuwait Super Cup: 2025-26
