= József Gáspár (footballer, born 1955) =

Football player (b. 1955)

Personal information
- Date of birth: 28 June 1955 (age 71)
- Place of birth: Budapest, Hungary
- Position: Goalkeeper

Youth career
- 1968-1972: Grànit SK
- 1972-1975: MTK Budapest FC

Senior career*
Years	Team	Apps	(Gls)
1975-1989	MTK Budapest FC	298	(0)
1989-1991	RWD Molenbeek	45	(0)
1991	Budafoki MTE		
1992	Budapesti VSC	6	(0)

International career
1987-1990	Hungary	4	(0)

Managerial career
- 1993: Budafoki MTE
- 1993-1994: Hungary (gk coach)
- 1995-1997: Szigetszentmiklós
- 1996-1999: Csepel SC
- 1998-2001: Hungary (gk coach)
- 2000-2002: Budafoki MTE
- 2003: Fehérvár FC (gk coach)
- 2007-2010: Budatétény SE
- * Club domestic league appearances and goals

József Gáspár (born 28 June 1955) is a former Hungarian professional footballer who played as a goalkeeper, later became a football coach. He was a member of the Hungary national team.

== Career ==
He started his football career with Grànit SK. In 1972, he moved to MTK Budapest FC, where he made his debut in the top flight in 1975. He was a member of the championship-winning team in the 1986–87 season. He played a total of 298 league matches for the blue and white. Between 1989 and 1992 he defended for Belgian team R.W.D. Molenbeek. In 1992 he returned home and joined Budapesti VSC.

=== National team ===
Between 1987 and 1990 he played four times for the Hungary national team.

=== As a coach ===
From 1993 to 1994 he was head coach of Budafoki MTE. In 1994, he became head of the MTK Budapest FC section. In 1996-97 he was goalkeeper coach of Csepel SC. In 1997 he also served as the team's head coach for 11 matches.

== Honours ==
- Nemzeti Bajnokság I (NB I)
  - Champion: 1986–87
- Magyar Kupa (MNK)
  - Winner: 1992
- UEFA Europe League
  - Quarter-finalist: 1976-1977
