= Hussain Fadhel =

Kuwaiti footballer (born 1984)

Personal information
- Full name: Hussain Fadhel Ali
- Date of birth: 9 October 1984 (age 42)
- Place of birth: Kuwait City, Kuwait
- Height: 1.83 m (6 ft 0 in)
- Position: Centre-back

Youth career
- 1998–2003: Qadsia

Senior career*
Years	Team	Apps	(Gls)
2003–2017	Qadsia	114	(7)
2013–2016	→ Al-Wahda (loan)	33	(2)

International career
2008–2015	Kuwait	53	(4)
- * Club domestic league appearances and goals

Hussain Fadhel (born 9 October 1984 in Kuwait City, Kuwait) is a Kuwaiti former professional footballer who played as a centre-back for Qadsia SC and the Kuwait national team.

He played for Al Qadisiya in the 2008 AFC Champions League group stages.

In August 2012, he went for trials to English club Nottingham Forest but failed to get a work permit.

He has made several appearances for the Kuwait national team, including four qualifying matches for the 2010 FIFA World Cup.

On 9 January 2015, Fadhel scored the first goal of the 2015 AFC Asian Cup, scoring against host nation Australia in the 8th minute of the match, though his team ended up losing 4–1. Fadhel was also the first player to be booked in the 2015 Asian Cup, receiving a yellow card in the 19th minute of the match.

He won the UAE League Cup in 2016

== International goals ==
Scores and results list Kuwait's goal tally first.

No	Venue	Opponent	Score	Result	Competition
1.	Amman, Jordan	Iraq	2–0	Win	Friendly
2.	Kuwait City, Kuwait	South Korea	1–1	Draw	2014 FIFA World Cup qualifiers
3.	Bangkok, Thailand	Thailand	3–1	Win	2015 AFC Asian Cup qualification
4.	Melbourne, Australia	Australia	1–4	Lost	2015 AFC Asian Cup
