= Kim Jin-hyeon =

South Korean footballer

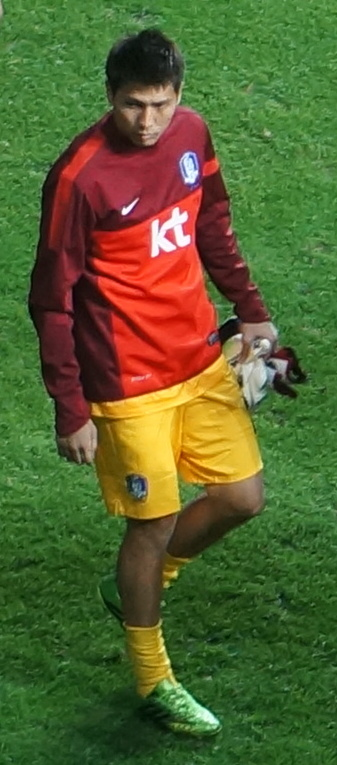
- Kim with South Korea in 2013

Personal information
- Full name: Kim Jin-hyeon
- Date of birth: 6 July 1987 (age 39)
- Place of birth: Suwon, South Korea
- Height: 1.93 m (6 ft 4 in)
- Position: Goalkeeper

Team information
- Current team: Tochigi City (on loan from Cerezo Osaka)
- Number: 97

Youth career
- 2003–2005: Dongguk University College of Education High School

College career
Years	Team	Apps	(Gls)
2006–2008	Dongguk University		

Senior career*
Years	Team	Apps	(Gls)
2009–	Cerezo Osaka	539	(0)
2026–	→ Tochigi City (loan)	2	(0)

International career^{‡}
2005–2007	South Korea U-20	17	(0)
2011–	South Korea	16	(0)
Medal record
Men's football
Representing South Korea
AFC Asian Cup
Runner-up	2015 Australia
- * Club domestic league appearances and goals as of 16 August 2026 ‡ National team caps and goals as of 11 September 2018

- Kim Jin-hyeon
- Hangul: 김진현
- Hanja: 金鎭鉉
- RR: Gim Jinhyeon
- MR: Kim Chinhyŏn

Kim Jin-hyeon (Korean: 김진현; Hanja: 金鎭鉉; Korean pronunciation: [kim.dʑin.ɦjʌn]; born 6 July 1987) is a South Korean professional footballer who plays as a goalkeeper for Tochigi City on loan from Cerezo Osaka.

== International career ==
Kim made 3 appearances for South Korea U-20 in the 2007 FIFA U-20 World Cup. He made his national team debut on 30 May 2012 in a friendly match against Spain.

Kim became the starting goalkeeper for the national team in the 2015 Asian Cup with the exception of the match against Kuwait. He kept a clean sheet throughout the tournament until the final against Australia, where he conceded two goals in a 2–1 defeat. He was later nominated for the Best Goalkeeper award in the tournament.

Kim has been the main goal keeper for Cerezo Osaka since 2009. In the 2017 J-League season, Cerezo Osaka won two cups and a third in the league and won the Asian Football Confederation (AFC) Champions League qualification.

In May 2018 he was named in South Korea's preliminary 28 man squad for the 2018 FIFA World Cup in Russia.

== Career statistics ==
=== Club ===
Updated to the start from 2026-27 season.

Appearances and goals by club, season and competition
Club	Season	League			National cup		League cup		Continental		Other		Total	
Club	Season	Division	Apps	Goals	Apps	Goals	Apps	Goals	Apps	Goals	Apps	Goals	Apps	Goals
Cerezo Osaka	2009	J2 League	50	0	1	0	—		—		—		51	0
Cerezo Osaka	2010	J1 League	19	0	1	0	5	0	—		—		25	0
Cerezo Osaka	2011	J1 League	34	0	3	0	1	0	9 (Note: AFC Champions League)	0	—		47	0
Cerezo Osaka	2012	J1 League	34	0	0	0	5	0	—		—		39	0
Cerezo Osaka	2013	J1 League	34	0	2	0	8	0	—		—		44	0
Cerezo Osaka	2014	J1 League	31	0	4	0	0	0	8	0	—		43	0
Cerezo Osaka	2015	J2 League	24	0	0	0	—		—		2 (Note: J1/J2 Playoffs)	0	26	0
Cerezo Osaka	2016	J2 League	39	0	1	0	—		—		2	0	42	0
Cerezo Osaka	2017	J1 League	31	0	2	0	4	0	—		—		37	0
Cerezo Osaka	2018	J1 League	34	0	1	0	0	0	4	0	1 (Note: Japanese Super Cup)	0	40	0
Cerezo Osaka	2019	J1 League	34	0	0	0	0	0	—		—		34	0
Cerezo Osaka	2020	J1 League	34	0	—		3	0	—		—		37	0
Cerezo Osaka	2021	J1 League	38	0	4	0	5	0	5	0	—		52	0
Cerezo Osaka	2022	J1 League	33	0	1	0	7	0	—		—		41	0
Cerezo Osaka	2023	J1 League	20	0	0	0	3	0	—		—		23	0
Cerezo Osaka	2024	J1 League	38	0	0	0	1	0	—		—		39	0
Cerezo Osaka	2025	J1 League	9	0	3	0	5	0	—		—		17	0
Cerezo Osaka	2026	J1 100	3	0	—		—		—		—		3	0
Career total			539	0	23	0	47	0	26	0	5	0	640	0

^{1}Includes Japanese Super Cup and J1/J2 Playoffs.

=== International ===
As of match played 11 September 2018

Appearances and goals by national team and year
National team	Year	Apps	Goals
South Korea	2011	0	0
South Korea	2012	1	0
South Korea	2013	0	0
South Korea	2014	3	0
South Korea	2015	6	0
South Korea	2016	2	0
South Korea	2017	2	0
South Korea	2018	2	0
South Korea	2019	0	0
South Korea	2021	0	0
Total		16	0

=== International clean sheets ===
As of 11 September 2018
Results list South Korea's goal tally first.

Kim Jin-hyeon international clean sheets
#	Date	Venue	Opponent	Result	Competition
1	10 October 2014	Cheonan	Paraguay	2–0	Friendly match
2	10 January 2015	Canberra	Oman	1–0	2015 AFC Asian Cup
3	17 January 2015	Brisbane	Australia	1–0	2015 AFC Asian Cup
4	22 January 2015	Melbourne	Uzbekistan	2–0	2015 AFC Asian Cup
5	26 January 2015	Sydney	Iraq	2–0	2015 AFC Asian Cup
6	31 March 2015	Seoul	New Zealand	1–0	Friendly match
7	24 March 2016	Ansan	Lebanon	1–0	2018 FIFA World Cup qualification
8	11 September 2018	Suwon	Chile	0–0	Friendly match

== Honours ==
=== Club ===
Cerezo Osaka

- J. League Cup: 2017
- Emperor's Cup: 2017
- Japanese Super Cup: 2018

=== International ===
South Korea

- EAFF East Asian Cup: 2017
- AFC Asian Cup runner-up: 2015
