= 2015 AFC Asian Cup squads =

The 2015 AFC Asian Cup was an international football tournament that was held in Australia from 9 to 31 January 2015. The 16 national teams involved in the tournament were required to register a squad of 23 players, including three goalkeepers. Only players in these squads were eligible to take part in the tournament.

Before announcing their final squad, several teams named a provisional squad of 23 to 30 players, but each country's final squad of 23 players had to be submitted by 30 December 2014. Replacement of injured players was permitted until six hours before the team's first Asian Cup game. Players marked (c) were named as captain for their national squad. Number of caps counts until the start of the tournament, including all FIFA-recognized pre-tournament friendlies. Player's age is their age on the opening day of the tournament.

== Group A ==
=== Australia ===
Coach: Ange Postecoglou

On 7 December 2014, Postecoglou named a provisional list of 46 players for the tournament. The final squad was announced on 23 December 2014.

No.	Pos.	Player	Date of birth (age)	Caps	Goals	Club
1	GK	Mathew Ryan	8 April 1992 (aged 22)	13	0	(Royal Belgian Football Association) Club Brugge
2	DF	Ivan Franjic	10 September 1987 (aged 27)	12	0	(Russian Football Union) Torpedo Moscow
3	DF	Jason Davidson	29 June 1991 (aged 23)	13	0	(The Football Association) West Bromwich Albion
4	MF	Tim Cahill	6 December 1979 (aged 35)	77	36	(United States Soccer Federation) New York Red Bulls
5	DF	Mark Milligan	4 August 1985 (aged 29)	33	2	(Football Australia) Melbourne Victory
6	DF	Matthew Spiranovic	27 June 1988 (aged 26)	21	0	(Football Australia) Western Sydney Wanderers
7	FW	Mathew Leckie	4 February 1991 (aged 23)	16	1	(German Football Association) Ingolstadt 04
8	MF	Chris Herd	4 April 1989 (aged 25)	3	0	(The Football Association) Aston Villa
9	FW	Tomi Juric	22 July 1991 (aged 23)	5	1	(Football Australia) Western Sydney Wanderers
10	FW	Robbie Kruse	5 October 1988 (aged 26)	32	3	(German Football Association) Bayer Leverkusen
11	FW	Tommy Oar	10 December 1991 (aged 23)	21	1	(Royal Dutch Football Association) FC Utrecht
12	GK	Mitchell Langerak	22 August 1988 (aged 26)	5	0	(German Football Association) Borussia Dortmund
13	DF	Aziz Behich	16 December 1990 (aged 24)	7	2	(Turkish Football Federation) Bursaspor
14	MF	James Troisi	3 July 1988 (aged 26)	16	1	(Royal Belgian Football Association) Zulte Waregem
15	MF	Mile Jedinak (c)	3 August 1984 (aged 30)	52	6	(The Football Association) Crystal Palace
16	FW	Nathan Burns	7 May 1988 (aged 26)	7	0	(New Zealand Football) Wellington Phoenix
17	MF	Matt McKay	11 January 1983 (aged 32)	50	1	(Football Australia) Brisbane Roar
18	GK	Eugene Galekovic	12 June 1981 (aged 33)	8	0	(Football Australia) Adelaide United
19	MF	Terry Antonis	26 November 1993 (aged 21)	3	0	(Football Australia) Sydney FC
20	DF	Trent Sainsbury	5 January 1992 (aged 23)	4	0	(Royal Dutch Football Association) PEC Zwolle
21	MF	Massimo Luongo	25 September 1992 (aged 22)	5	0	(The Football Association) Swindon Town
22	DF	Alex Wilkinson	13 August 1984 (aged 30)	11	0	(Korea Football Association) Jeonbuk Hyundai Motors
23	MF	Mark Bresciano	11 February 1980 (aged 34)	81	13	(Qatar Football Association) Al-Gharafa

=== South Korea ===
Coach: (Germany) Uli Stielike

The final squad was announced on 22 December 2014.

No.	Pos.	Player	Date of birth (age)	Caps	Goals	Club
1	GK	Jung Sung-ryong	4 January 1985 (aged 30)	64	0	(Korea Football Association) Suwon Bluewings
2	DF	Kim Chang-soo	12 September 1985 (aged 29)	13	0	(Japan Football Association) Kashiwa Reysol
3	DF	Kim Jin-su	13 June 1992 (aged 22)	9	0	(German Football Association) 1899 Hoffenheim
4	DF	Kim Ju-young	9 July 1988 (aged 26)	4	0	(Chinese Football Association) Shanghai SIPG
5	DF	Kwak Tae-hwi	8 July 1981 (aged 33)	37	5	(Saudi Arabian Football Federation) Al Hilal
6	DF	Park Joo-ho	16 January 1987 (aged 27)	17	0	(German Football Association) Mainz 05
7	FW	Son Heung-min	8 July 1992 (aged 22)	34	7	(German Football Association) Bayer Leverkusen
8	MF	Kim Min-woo	25 February 1990 (aged 24)	9	1	(Japan Football Association) Sagan Tosu
9	FW	Cho Young-cheol	31 May 1989 (aged 25)	10	0	(Qatar Football Association) Qatar SC
10	MF	Nam Tae-hee	3 July 1991 (aged 23)	16	1	(Qatar Football Association) Lekhwiya
11	FW	Lee Keun-ho	11 April 1985 (aged 29)	70	19	(Qatar Football Association) El-Jaish
12	MF	Han Kyo-won	15 June 1990 (aged 24)	4	1	(Korea Football Association) Jeonbuk Hyundai Motors
13	MF	Koo Ja-cheol	27 February 1989 (aged 25)	42	13	(German Football Association) Mainz 05
14	MF	Han Kook-young	19 April 1990 (aged 24)	18	0	(Qatar Football Association) Qatar SC
15	MF	Lee Myung-joo	24 April 1990 (aged 24)	12	1	(United Arab Emirates Football Association) Al-Ain
16	MF	Ki Sung-yueng (c)	24 January 1989 (aged 25)	66	5	(Football Association of Wales) Swansea City
17	MF	Lee Chung-yong	2 July 1988 (aged 26)	64	6	(The Football Association) Bolton Wanderers
18	FW	Lee Jung-hyup	24 June 1991 (aged 23)	0	0	(Korea Football Association) Sangju Sangmu
19	DF	Kim Young-gwon	27 February 1990 (aged 24)	29	1	(Chinese Football Association) Guangzhou Evergrande
20	DF	Jang Hyun-soo	28 September 1991 (aged 23)	7	0	(Chinese Football Association) Guangzhou R&F
21	GK	Kim Seung-gyu	30 September 1990 (aged 24)	7	0	(Korea Football Association) Ulsan Hyundai
22	DF	Cha Du-ri	25 July 1980 (aged 34)	70	4	(Korea Football Association) FC Seoul
23	GK	Kim Jin-hyeon	6 July 1987 (aged 27)	4	0	(Japan Football Association) Cerezo Osaka

=== Oman ===
Coach: (France) Paul Le Guen

The final squad was announced on 25 December 2014. There were two changes in the final squad: Sulaiman Al-Buraiki replaced Mohannad Al-Zaabi and Amer Said Al-Shatri replaced Saad Al-Mukhaini.

No.	Pos.	Player	Date of birth (age)	Caps	Goals	Club
1	GK	Ali Al-Habsi (c)	30 December 1981 (aged 33)	100	0	(The Football Association) Wigan Athletic
2	DF	Mohammed Al-Musalami	27 April 1990 (aged 24)	35	2	(Oman Football Association) Fanja
3	DF	Jaber Al-Owaisi	4 November 1989 (aged 25)	27	2	(Oman Football Association) Al-Shabab
4	MF	Ali Al-Jabri	29 January 1990 (aged 24)	33	0	(Oman Football Association) Fanja
5	DF	Nasser Al-Shimli	15 February 1989 (aged 25)	7	0	(Oman Football Association) Al-Oruba
6	FW	Raed Ibrahim Saleh	9 June 1992 (aged 22)	42	2	(Oman Football Association) Fanja
7	FW	Mohammed Al-Siyabi	21 December 1988 (aged 26)	17	2	(Oman Football Association) Al-Shabab
8	MF	Eid Al-Farsi	31 January 1987 (aged 27)	47	4	(Oman Football Association) Al-Oruba
9	FW	Abdulaziz Al-Muqbali	23 April 1989 (aged 25)	38	12	(Oman Football Association) Fanja
10	FW	Qasim Said	20 April 1989 (aged 25)	58	8	(Oman Football Association) Al-Nasr
11	DF	Amer Said Al-Shatri	5 April 1990 (aged 24)	1	0	(Oman Football Association) Dhofar
12	MF	Ahmed Mubarak Al-Mahaijri	23 February 1985 (aged 29)	108	12	(Oman Football Association) Al-Oruba
13	DF	Abdul Salam Al-Mukhaini	7 April 1988 (aged 26)	38	1	(Oman Football Association) Al-Oruba
14	FW	Yaqoob Abdul-Karim	4 September 1985 (aged 29)	33	3	(Oman Football Association) Saham
15	DF	Ali Salim Al-Nahar	21 August 1992 (aged 22)	17	0	(Oman Football Association) Dhofar
16	DF	Ali Al-Busaidi	21 January 1991 (aged 23)	11	0	(Oman Football Association) Al-Nahda
17	DF	Hassan Mudhafar Al-Gheilani	26 June 1980 (aged 34)	113	6	(Oman Football Association) Al-Oruba
18	GK	Mazin Al-Kasbi	27 April 1993 (aged 21)	13	0	(Oman Football Association) Fanja
19	DF	Ahmed Al-Mukhaini	2 May 1985 (aged 29)	0	0	(Oman Football Association) Al-Oruba
20	FW	Amad Al-Hosni	18 July 1984 (aged 30)	115	36	(Oman Football Association) Saham
21	MF	Mohsin Al-Khaldi	1 January 1992 (aged 23)	1	0	(Oman Football Association) Saham
22	GK	Sulaiman Al-Buraiki	30 July 1986 (aged 28)	0	0	(Oman Football Association) Al-Nahda
23	FW	Said Al-Ruzaiqi	12 December 1986 (aged 28)	4	3	(Oman Football Association) Al-Nahda

=== Kuwait ===
Coach: (Tunisia) Nabil Maâloul

The final squad was announced on 30 December 2014.

No.	Pos.	Player	Date of birth (age)	Caps	Goals	Club
1	GK	Khaled Al-Rashidi	20 April 1987 (aged 27)	12	0	(Kuwait Football Association) Al-Salmiya
2	MF	Amer Al-Fadhel	21 April 1988 (aged 26)	14	0	(Kuwait Football Association) Qadsia
3	DF	Fahad Awadh	26 February 1985 (aged 29)	27	2	(Kuwait Football Association) Al-Kuwait
4	DF	Hussain Fadhel	9 October 1984 (aged 30)	43	2	(United Arab Emirates Football Association) Al-Wahda
5	DF	Fahed Al Hajeri	10 November 1991 (aged 23)	14	0	(Kuwait Football Association) Qadsia
6	DF	Khaled Al-Qahtani	16 February 1985 (aged 29)	14	0	(Kuwait Football Association) Qadsia
7	MF	Talal Al Fadhel	11 August 1990 (aged 24)	0	0	(Kuwait Football Association) Kazma
8	MF	Saleh Al Sheikh	29 May 1982 (aged 32)	39	1	(Kuwait Football Association) Qadsia
9	MF	Abdullah Al Buraiki	12 August 1987 (aged 27)	10	1	(Kuwait Football Association) Al-Kuwait
10	MF	Aziz Mashaan	19 October 1988 (aged 26)	7	0	(Kuwait Football Association) Qadsia
11	MF	Fahad Al Ansari	25 February 1987 (aged 27)	21	1	(Kuwait Football Association) Qadsia
12	MF	Sultan Al Enezi	29 March 1992 (aged 22)	15	0	(Kuwait Football Association) Qadsia
13	DF	Musaed Neda (c)	8 July 1983 (aged 31)	70	15	(Saudi Arabian Football Federation) Al-Oruba
14	MF	Talal Al-Amer	22 February 1987 (aged 27)	21	0	(Kuwait Football Association) Qadsia
15	FW	Faisal Al Enezi	11 June 1988 (aged 26)	0	0	(Kuwait Football Association) Al-Salmiya
16	MF	Faisal Zaid	9 October 1991 (aged 23)	1	0	(Kuwait Football Association) Jahra
17	FW	Bader Al-Mutawa	10 January 1985 (aged 29)	149	47	(Kuwait Football Association) Qadsia
18	DF	Khalid El Ebrahim	28 August 1992 (aged 22)	5	0	(Kuwait Football Association) Qadsia
19	FW	Abdul Rahman Al Shammari	13 February 1993 (aged 21)	2	0	(Kuwait Football Association) Al-Nasr
20	FW	Yousef Nasser	9 October 1990 (aged 24)	48	30	(Kuwait Football Association) Kazma
21	FW	Ali Maqseed	11 December 1986 (aged 28)	58	4	(Kuwait Football Association) Al-Arabi
22	GK	Sulaiman Abdulghafour	21 February 1991 (aged 23)	3	0	(Kuwait Football Association) Al-Arabi
23	GK	Hameed Youssef	10 August 1987 (aged 27)	6	0	(Kuwait Football Association) Al-Arabi

== Group B ==
=== Uzbekistan ===
Coach: Mirjalol Qosimov

The final squad was announced on 30 December 2014.

No.	Pos.	Player	Date of birth (age)	Caps	Goals	Club
1	GK	Eldorbek Suyunov	12 April 1991 (aged 23)	7	0	(Uzbekistan Football Association) Nasaf Qarshi
2	DF	Egor Krimets	27 January 1992 (aged 22)	4	0	(Uzbekistan Football Association) Pakhtakor Tashkent
3	DF	Shavkat Mullajanov	19 January 1986 (aged 28)	23	0	(Uzbekistan Football Association) Olmaliq
4	FW	Sardor Rashidov	14 June 1991 (aged 23)	9	2	(Uzbekistan Football Association) Bunyodkor
5	DF	Anzur Ismailov	21 April 1985 (aged 29)	55	1	(Chinese Football Association) Changchun Yatai
6	FW	Bahodir Nasimov	2 May 1987 (aged 27)	11	5	(Football Federation Islamic Republic of Iran) Padideh
7	MF	Azizbek Haydarov	8 July 1985 (aged 29)	56	0	(United Arab Emirates Football Association) Al-Shabab
8	MF	Server Djeparov (c)	3 October 1982 (aged 32)	102	23	(Korea Football Association) Seongnam
9	MF	Odil Ahmedov	25 November 1987 (aged 27)	60	11	(Russian Football Union) Krasnodar
10	MF	Jamshid Iskanderov	16 October 1993 (aged 21)	9	0	(Uzbekistan Football Association) Pakhtakor Tashkent
11	FW	Igor Sergeev	30 April 1993 (aged 21)	9	4	(Uzbekistan Football Association) Pakhtakor Tashkent
12	GK	Ignatiy Nesterov	20 June 1983 (aged 31)	84	0	(Uzbekistan Football Association) Lokomotiv Tashkent
13	MF	Lutfulla Turaev	30 March 1988 (aged 26)	11	0	(Uzbekistan Football Association) Lokomotiv Tashkent
14	DF	Shukhrat Mukhammadiev	29 June 1989 (aged 25)	2	0	(Uzbekistan Football Association) Nasaf Qarshi
15	MF	Jasur Hasanov	2 August 1983 (aged 31)	39	1	(Uzbekistan Football Association) Lokomotiv Tashkent
16	MF	Vokhid Shodiev	9 November 1986 (aged 28)	4	2	(Uzbekistan Football Association) Bunyodkor
17	MF	Sanzhar Tursunov	29 December 1986 (aged 28)	36	5	(Ukrainian Association of Football) Vorskla Poltava
18	MF	Timur Kapadze	5 September 1981 (aged 33)	111	10	(Uzbekistan Football Association) Lokomotiv Tashkent
19	DF	Vitaliy Denisov	24 February 1987 (aged 27)	48	1	(Russian Football Union) Lokomotiv Moscow
20	DF	Islom Tukhtakhodjaev	30 October 1989 (aged 25)	37	0	(Uzbekistan Football Association) Lokomotiv Tashkent
21	GK	Akbar Turaev	27 August 1989 (aged 25)	0	0	(Uzbekistan Football Association) Bunyodkor
22	MF	Farrukh Sayfiev	17 January 1991 (aged 23)	2	0	(Uzbekistan Football Association) Nasaf Qarshi
23	DF	Akmal Shorakhmedov	10 May 1986 (aged 28)	14	0	(Uzbekistan Football Association) Bunyodkor

=== Saudi Arabia ===
Coach: (Romania) Cosmin Olăroiu

The final squad was announced on 25 December 2014. Nasser Al-Shamrani was ruled out for the tournament due to injury and replaced by Ibrahim Ghaleb.

No.	Pos.	Player	Date of birth (age)	Caps	Goals	Club
1	GK	Waleed Abdullah	19 April 1986 (aged 28)	58	0	(Saudi Arabian Football Federation) Al-Shabab
2	DF	Saeed Al-Muwallad	9 March 1991 (aged 23)	6	0	(Saudi Arabian Football Federation) Al-Ahli
3	DF	Osama Hawsawi	31 March 1984 (aged 30)	103	6	(Saudi Arabian Football Federation) Al-Ahli
4	DF	Abdullah Al-Zori	13 August 1987 (aged 27)	37	1	(Saudi Arabian Football Federation) Al-Hilal
5	DF	Omar Hawsawi	27 September 1985 (aged 29)	6	0	(Saudi Arabian Football Federation) Al-Nassr
6	MF	Mustafa Al-Bassas	2 June 1993 (aged 21)	8	0	(Saudi Arabian Football Federation) Al-Ahli
7	MF	Salman Al-Faraj	1 August 1989 (aged 25)	5	0	(Saudi Arabian Football Federation) Al-Hilal
8	MF	Yahya Al-Shehri	26 June 1990 (aged 24)	20	0	(Saudi Arabian Football Federation) Al-Nassr
9	FW	Naif Hazazi	11 January 1989 (aged 25)	46	9	(Saudi Arabian Football Federation) Al-Shabab
10	FW	Mohammad Al-Sahlawi	10 January 1987 (aged 27)	7	4	(Saudi Arabian Football Federation) Al-Nassr
11	MF	Waleed Bakshween	12 November 1989 (aged 25)	9	0	(Saudi Arabian Football Federation) Al-Ahli
12	DF	Hassan Fallatah	27 January 1986 (aged 28)	48	3	(Saudi Arabian Football Federation) Al-Shabab
13	DF	Yasser Al-Shahrani	25 May 1992 (aged 22)	10	0	(Saudi Arabian Football Federation) Al-Hilal
14	MF	Saud Kariri (c)	8 July 1980 (aged 34)	125	6	(Saudi Arabian Football Federation) Al-Hilal
15	MF	Ibrahim Ghaleb	28 September 1990 (aged 24)	15	0	(Saudi Arabian Football Federation) Al-Nassr
16	DF	Motaz Hawsawi	17 February 1992 (aged 22)	7	3	(Saudi Arabian Football Federation) Al-Ahli
17	MF	Taisir Al-Jassim	25 July 1984 (aged 30)	90	10	(Saudi Arabian Football Federation) Al-Ahli
18	FW	Salem Al-Dawsari	19 August 1991 (aged 23)	17	2	(Saudi Arabian Football Federation) Al-Hilal
19	FW	Fahad Al-Muwallad	14 September 1994 (aged 20)	15	5	(Saudi Arabian Football Federation) Al-Ittihad
20	MF	Nawaf Al-Abed	26 January 1990 (aged 24)	23	2	(Saudi Arabian Football Federation) Al-Hilal
21	GK	Abdullah Al-Sudairy	2 February 1992 (aged 22)	1	0	(Saudi Arabian Football Federation) Al-Hilal
22	GK	Abdullah Al-Enezi	20 September 1990 (aged 24)	2	0	(Saudi Arabian Football Federation) Al-Nassr
23	DF	Majed Al-Marshedi	1 November 1984 (aged 30)	45	0	(Saudi Arabian Football Federation) Al-Shabab

=== China ===
Coach: (France) Alain Perrin

The final squad was announced on 24 December 2014.

No.	Pos.	Player	Date of birth (age)	Caps	Goals	Club
1	GK	Zeng Cheng	8 January 1987 (aged 28)	30	0	(Chinese Football Association) Guangzhou Evergrande
2	DF	Ren Hang	23 February 1989 (aged 25)	10	0	(Chinese Football Association) Jiangsu Sainty
3	DF	Mei Fang	14 November 1989 (aged 25)	8	0	(Chinese Football Association) Guangzhou Evergrande
4	DF	Jiang Zhipeng	6 March 1989 (aged 25)	7	0	(Chinese Football Association) Guangzhou R&F
5	DF	Zhang Linpeng	9 May 1989 (aged 25)	41	4	(Chinese Football Association) Guangzhou Evergrande
6	DF	Li Ang	15 September 1993 (aged 21)	1	0	(Chinese Football Association) Jiangsu Sainty
7	FW	Wu Lei	19 November 1991 (aged 23)	22	5	(Chinese Football Association) Shanghai SIPG
8	MF	Cai Huikang	10 October 1989 (aged 25)	8	0	(Chinese Football Association) Shanghai SIPG
9	FW	Yang Xu	12 February 1987 (aged 27)	33	14	(Chinese Football Association) Shandong Luneng
10	MF	Zheng Zhi (c)	20 August 1980 (aged 34)	81	15	(Chinese Football Association) Guangzhou Evergrande
11	MF	Hao Junmin	24 March 1987 (aged 27)	49	12	(Chinese Football Association) Shandong Luneng
12	GK	Yan Junling	28 January 1991 (aged 23)	0	0	(Chinese Football Association) Shanghai SIPG
13	DF	Liu Jianye	17 June 1987 (aged 27)	41	0	(Chinese Football Association) Jiangsu Sainty
14	DF	Ji Xiang	1 March 1990 (aged 24)	2	0	(Chinese Football Association) Jiangsu Sainty
15	MF	Wu Xi	19 February 1989 (aged 25)	21	1	(Chinese Football Association) Jiangsu Sainty
16	FW	Sun Ke	26 August 1989 (aged 25)	22	4	(Chinese Football Association) Jiangsu Sainty
17	DF	Zhang Chengdong	9 February 1989 (aged 25)	14	0	(Chinese Football Association) Beijing Guoan
18	FW	Gao Lin	14 February 1986 (aged 28)	79	18	(Chinese Football Association) Guangzhou Evergrande
19	FW	Liu Binbin	16 June 1993 (aged 21)	2	0	(Chinese Football Association) Shandong Luneng
20	FW	Yu Hanchao	25 February 1987 (aged 27)	36	6	(Chinese Football Association) Guangzhou Evergrande
21	DF	Yu Hai	4 June 1987 (aged 27)	50	10	(Chinese Football Association) Guizhou Renhe
22	MF	Liao Lisheng	29 April 1993 (aged 21)	4	0	(Chinese Football Association) Guangzhou Evergrande
23	GK	Wang Dalei	10 January 1989 (aged 25)	10	0	(Chinese Football Association) Shandong Luneng

=== North Korea ===
Coach: Jo Tong-sop

The final squad was announced on 30 December 2014.

No.	Pos.	Player	Date of birth (age)	Caps	Goals	Club
1	GK	Ri Myong-guk	9 September 1986 (aged 28)	61	0	(DPR Korea Football Association) Pyongyang City
2	DF	Ri Chang-ho	4 January 1990 (aged 25)	0	0	(DPR Korea Football Association) Rimyongsu
3	DF	Jang Song-hyok	18 January 1991 (aged 23)	10	2	(DPR Korea Football Association) Rimyongsu
4	DF	Jon Kwang-ik	5 April 1988 (aged 26)	35	2	(DPR Korea Football Association) Amrokgang
5	DF	Han Song-hyok	11 December 1987 (aged 27)	3	0	(DPR Korea Football Association) Rimyongsu
6	DF	Ro Hak-su	19 January 1990 (aged 24)	12	2	(DPR Korea Football Association) Rimyongsu
7	MF	Ri Sang-chol	26 December 1990 (aged 24)	2	2	(DPR Korea Football Association) Rimyongsu
8	MF	Ryang Yong-gi	7 January 1982 (aged 33)	21	4	(Japan Football Association) Vegalta Sendai
9	MF	Pak Song-chol (c)	24 September 1987 (aged 27)	31	10	(DPR Korea Football Association) Rimyongsu
10	FW	Pak Kwang-ryong	27 September 1992 (aged 22)	12	3	(Swiss Football Association) Basel
11	FW	Jong Il-gwan	30 October 1992 (aged 22)	25	6	(DPR Korea Football Association) Rimyongsu
12	FW	Om Chol-song	12 November 1992 (aged 22)	1	0	(DPR Korea Football Association) April 25
13	DF	Sim Hyon-jin	1 January 1991 (aged 24)	9	1	(DPR Korea Football Association) April 25
14	FW	Kye Song-hyok	12 November 1992 (aged 22)	2	1	(DPR Korea Football Association) April 25
15	DF	Jang Kuk-chol	16 February 1994 (aged 20)	11	2	(DPR Korea Football Association) Hwaebul
16	DF	Cha Jong-hyok	25 September 1985 (aged 29)	45	1	(Swiss Football Association) Wil 1900
17	FW	So Hyon-uk	17 April 1992 (aged 22)	3	0	(DPR Korea Football Association) April 25
18	GK	Ri Kwang-il	13 April 1988 (aged 26)	0	0	(DPR Korea Football Association) April 25
19	MF	Ri Yong-jik	8 February 1991 (aged 23)	0	0	(Japan Football Association) Tokushima Vortis
20	FW	Choe Won	25 November 1992 (aged 22)	4	0	(DPR Korea Football Association) Hwaebul
21	MF	O Hyok-chol	2 August 1991 (aged 23)	3	1	(DPR Korea Football Association) April 25
22	GK	Ju Kwang-min	20 May 1990 (aged 24)	14	0	(DPR Korea Football Association) Rimyongsu

== Group C ==
=== Iran ===
Coach: (Portugal) Carlos Queiroz

The final squad was announced on 30 December 2014. On 7 January 2015, Hashem Beikzadeh was replaced by Mohammad Reza Khanzadeh due to injury.

No.	Pos.	Player	Date of birth (age)	Caps	Goals	Club
1	GK	Alireza Haghighi	2 May 1988 (aged 26)	10	0	(Portuguese Football Federation) Penafiel
2	DF	Khosro Heydari	14 September 1983 (aged 31)	53	0	(Football Federation Islamic Republic of Iran) Esteghlal
3	DF	Ehsan Hajsafi	25 February 1990 (aged 24)	66	3	(Football Federation Islamic Republic of Iran) Sepahan
4	DF	Jalal Hosseini	3 February 1982 (aged 32)	89	6	(Qatar Football Association) Al-Ahli
5	DF	Amir Hossein Sadeghi	6 September 1981 (aged 33)	20	1	(Football Federation Islamic Republic of Iran) Esteghlal
6	MF	Javad Nekounam (c)	7 September 1980 (aged 34)	145	37	(Royal Spanish Football Federation) Osasuna
7	MF	Masoud Shojaei	9 June 1984 (aged 30)	54	5	(Qatar Football Association) Al-Shahania
8	DF	Morteza Pouraliganji	19 April 1992 (aged 22)	1	0	(Football Federation Islamic Republic of Iran) Naft Tehran
9	MF	Omid Ebrahimi	16 September 1987 (aged 27)	7	0	(Football Federation Islamic Republic of Iran) Esteghlal
10	FW	Karim Ansarifard	3 April 1990 (aged 24)	45	9	(Royal Spanish Football Federation) Osasuna
11	DF	Vouria Ghafouri	20 September 1987 (aged 27)	2	0	(Football Federation Islamic Republic of Iran) Sepahan
12	GK	Mohsen Forouzan	3 May 1988 (aged 26)	2	0	(Football Federation Islamic Republic of Iran) Esteghlal
13	FW	Vahid Amiri	2 April 1988 (aged 26)	1	0	(Football Federation Islamic Republic of Iran) Naft Tehran
14	MF	Andranik Teymourian	March 6, 1983 (aged 31)	84	8	(Football Federation Islamic Republic of Iran) Tractor Sazi
15	DF	Ramin Rezaeian	21 March 1990 (aged 24)	1	0	(Football Federation Islamic Republic of Iran) Rah Ahan
16	FW	Reza Ghoochannejhad	20 September 1987 (aged 27)	19	11	(The Football Association) Charlton Athletic
17	MF	Soroush Rafiei	24 March 1990 (aged 24)	2	0	(Football Federation Islamic Republic of Iran) Foolad
18	FW	Alireza Jahanbakhsh	11 August 1993 (aged 21)	12	1	(Royal Dutch Football Association) NEC
19	DF	Mohammad Reza Khanzadeh	11 May 1991 (aged 23)	7	0	(Football Federation Islamic Republic of Iran) Persepolis
20	FW	Sardar Azmoun	1 January 1995 (aged 20)	4	2	(Russian Football Union) Rubin Kazan
21	FW	Ashkan Dejagah	5 June 1986 (aged 28)	19	4	(Qatar Football Association) Al-Arabi
22	GK	Alireza Beiranvand	22 September 1992 (aged 22)	1	0	(Football Federation Islamic Republic of Iran) Naft Tehran
23	DF	Mehrdad Pooladi	26 February 1987 (aged 27)	24	0	(Qatar Football Association) Al-Shahania

=== United Arab Emirates ===
Coach: Mahdi Ali

The final squad was announced on 27 December 2014. Mohamed Fawzi was ruled out for the tournament due to injury and replaced by Salem Saleh.

No.	Pos.	Player	Date of birth (age)	Caps	Goals	Club
1	GK	Majed Naser (c)	1 April 1984 (aged 30)	64	0	(United Arab Emirates Football Association) Al-Ahli
2	MF	Hassan Ibrahim Saqer	19 October 1990 (aged 24)	4	0	(United Arab Emirates Football Association) Al-Shabab
3	DF	Walid Abbas	11 June 1985 (aged 29)	15	4	(United Arab Emirates Football Association) Al-Ahli
4	MF	Habib Fardan	11 November 1990 (aged 24)	14	7	(United Arab Emirates Football Association) Al-Nasr
5	MF	Amer Abdulrahman	3 July 1989 (aged 25)	37	2	(United Arab Emirates Football Association) Baniyas
6	DF	Mohanad Salem	1 March 1985 (aged 29)	3	0	(United Arab Emirates Football Association) Al-Ain
7	FW	Ali Mabkhout	5 October 1990 (aged 24)	31	20	(United Arab Emirates Football Association) Al-Jazira
8	DF	Hamdan Al-Kamali	2 May 1989 (aged 25)	31	0	(United Arab Emirates Football Association) Al-Wahda
9	DF	Abdulaziz Hussain	10 September 1990 (aged 24)	9	0	(United Arab Emirates Football Association) Al-Ahli
10	MF	Omar Abdulrahman	20 September 1991 (aged 23)	26	5	(United Arab Emirates Football Association) Al-Ain
11	FW	Ahmed Khalil	8 June 1991 (aged 23)	57	24	(United Arab Emirates Football Association) Al-Ahli
12	GK	Khalid Eisa	15 September 1989 (aged 25)	0	0	(United Arab Emirates Football Association) Al-Ain
13	MF	Khamis Esmaeel	16 August 1989 (aged 25)	6	0	(United Arab Emirates Football Association) Al-Jazira
14	DF	Abdelaziz Sanqour	7 May 1989 (aged 25)	2	0	(United Arab Emirates Football Association) Al-Ahli
15	MF	Ismail Al Hammadi	1 July 1988 (aged 26)	51	7	(United Arab Emirates Football Association) Al-Ahli
16	MF	Mohamed Abdulrahman	1 January 1989 (aged 26)	2	0	(United Arab Emirates Football Association) Al-Ain
17	MF	Majed Hassan	1 August 1992 (aged 22)	3	1	(United Arab Emirates Football Association) Al-Ahli
18	FW	Salem Saleh	14 May 1991 (aged 23)	0	0	(United Arab Emirates Football Association) Al-Wahda
19	DF	Ismail Ahmed	1 July 1983 (aged 31)	1	0	(United Arab Emirates Football Association) Al-Ain
20	FW	Saeed Al-Kathiri	28 March 1988 (aged 26)	15	4	(United Arab Emirates Football Association) Al-Wahda
21	MF	Haboush Saleh	13 July 1989 (aged 25)	8	0	(United Arab Emirates Football Association) Baniyas
22	GK	Mohamed Yousif	25 May 1991 (aged 23)	0	0	(United Arab Emirates Football Association) Sharjah
23	DF	Mohamed Ahmed	16 April 1989 (aged 25)	9	0	(United Arab Emirates Football Association) Al-Ain

=== Qatar ===
Coach: (Algeria) Djamel Belmadi

The final squad was announced on 23 December 2014.

No.	Pos.	Player	Date of birth (age)	Caps	Goals	Club
1	GK	Qasem Burhan	15 December 1985 (aged 29)	66	0	(Qatar Football Association) Al-Gharafa
2	DF	Mohammed Musa	23 March 1986 (aged 28)	24	0	(Qatar Football Association) Lekhwiya
3	DF	Abdelkarim Hassan	28 August 1993 (aged 21)	28	4	(Qatar Football Association) Al-Sadd
4	DF	Almahdi Ali Mukhtar	2 March 1992 (aged 22)	12	1	(Qatar Football Association) Al-Sadd
5	MF	Abdulaziz Hatem	28 October 1990 (aged 24)	19	0	(Qatar Football Association) Al-Arabi
6	DF	Bilal Mohammed (c)	2 June 1986 (aged 28)	103	2	(Qatar Football Association) Al-Gharafa
7	DF	Khalid Muftah	2 July 1992 (aged 22)	26	1	(Qatar Football Association) Lekhwiya
8	MF	Ali Assadalla	19 January 1993 (aged 21)	10	3	(Qatar Football Association) Al-Sadd
9	FW	Meshal Abdullah	2 May 1984 (aged 30)	33	6	(Qatar Football Association) Al-Ahli
10	MF	Khalfan Ibrahim	18 February 1988 (aged 26)	81	22	(Qatar Football Association) Al-Sadd
11	FW	Hassan Al-Haydos	11 December 1990 (aged 24)	49	3	(Qatar Football Association) Al-Sadd
12	MF	Magid Mohamed	11 October 1985 (aged 29)	56	8	(Qatar Football Association) El-Jaish
13	DF	Ibrahim Majid	12 May 1990 (aged 24)	67	4	(Qatar Football Association) Al-Sadd
14	MF	Khalid Abdulraouf	14 November 1989 (aged 25)	4	0	(Qatar Football Association) El-Jaish
15	DF	Abdurahman Abubakar	3 August 1990 (aged 24)	2	1	(Qatar Football Association) El-Jaish
16	DF	Boualem Khoukhi	7 September 1990 (aged 24)	11	6	(Qatar Football Association) Al-Arabi
17	FW	Ismaeel Mohammad	5 April 1990 (aged 24)	14	0	(Qatar Football Association) Lekhwiya
18	DF	Tresor Abdullah	8 April 1987 (aged 27)	0	0	(Qatar Football Association) Lekhwiya
19	FW	Mohammed Muntari	20 December 1993 (aged 21)	0	0	(Qatar Football Association) El-Jaish
20	MF	Karim Boudiaf	16 September 1989 (aged 25)	9	0	(Qatar Football Association) Lekhwiya
21	GK	Ahmed Soufiane	9 August 1990 (aged 24)	2	0	(Qatar Football Association) El-Jaish
22	GK	Saad Al-Sheeb	19 February 1990 (aged 24)	15	0	(Qatar Football Association) Al-Sadd
23	MF	Ahmed Abdul Maqsoud	7 August 1989 (aged 25)	9	1	(Qatar Football Association) Umm-Salal

=== Bahrain ===
Coach: Marjan Eid

The final squad was announced on 30 December 2014.

No.	Pos.	Player	Date of birth (age)	Caps	Goals	Club
1	GK	Sayed Mohammed Jaffer	25 August 1985 (aged 29)	54	0	(Bahrain Football Association) Muharraq
2	DF	Mohamed Husain (c)	31 July 1980 (aged 34)	90	8	(Saudi Arabian Football Federation) Al-Nassr
3	DF	Waleed Al-Hayam	4 November 1988 (aged 26)	8	0	(Bahrain Football Association) Muharraq
4	MF	Sayed Saeed	17 July 1992 (aged 22)	16	4	(Bahrain Football Association) Al-Riffa
5	DF	Abdulla Shallal	31 January 1993 (aged 21)	1	0	(Bahrain Football Association) Al-Riffa
6	DF	Abdulla Yaser	27 March 1988 (aged 26)	5	0	(Bahrain Football Association) Muharraq
7	MF	Abdulwahab Al-Safi	4 June 1984 (aged 30)	36	1	(Saudi Arabian Football Federation) Al-Qadisiyah
8	MF	Sayed Ahmed	4 March 1991 (aged 23)	9	0	(Bahrain Football Association) Al-Busaiteen
9	MF	Abdulwahab Al-Malood	21 July 1989 (aged 25)	15	1	(Bahrain Football Association) Hidd
10	FW	Mohammed Tayeb Al Alawi	13 October 1989 (aged 25)	10	5	(Bahrain Football Association) Al-Riffa
11	FW	Ismail Abdullatif	11 September 1986 (aged 28)	61	29	(Bahrain Football Association) Muharraq
12	MF	Faouzi Aaish	27 February 1985 (aged 29)	59	16	(Qatar Football Association) Al-Sailiya
13	DF	Abdulla Al-Haza'a	19 July 1990 (aged 24)	27	0	(Bahrain Football Association) Hidd
14	FW	Jaycee John Okwunwanne	8 October 1985 (aged 29)	45	21	(Qatar Football Association) Al-Mesaimeer
15	MF	Abdullah Omar	1 January 1987 (aged 28)	42	3	(Bahrain Football Association) Muharraq
16	FW	Abdulla Yusuf Helal	12 June 1993 (aged 21)	0	0	(Bahrain Football Association) East Riffa
17	DF	Hussain Ali Baba	11 February 1982 (aged 32)	71	1	(Bahrain Football Association) Muharraq
18	DF	Mohamed Duaij Mahorfi	9 May 1989 (aged 25)	23	0	(Bahrain Football Association) Al-Riffa
19	FW	Faisal Bodahoom	25 September 1988 (aged 26)	0	0	(Bahrain Football Association) East Riffa
20	FW	Sami Al-Husaini	29 September 1989 (aged 25)	37	4	(Bahrain Football Association) Al-Busaiteen
21	GK	Hamed Al-Doseri	24 July 1989 (aged 25)	1	0	(Bahrain Football Association) Al-Riffa
22	GK	Ashraf Waheed Al-Sebaie	5 July 1991 (aged 23)	0	0	(Bahrain Football Association) Manama
23	DF	Rashed Al-Hooti	24 December 1989 (aged 25)	16	0	(Bahrain Football Association) Al-Riffa

== Group D ==
=== Japan ===
Coach: (Mexico) Javier Aguirre

The final squad was announced on 15 December 2014. However, defender Atsuto Uchida sustained injury afterwards and was replaced by Naomichi Ueda.

No.	Pos.	Player	Date of birth (age)	Caps	Goals	Club
1	GK	Eiji Kawashima	20 March 1983 (aged 31)	64	0	(Royal Belgian Football Association) Standard Liège
2	DF	Naomichi Ueda	24 October 1994 (aged 20)	0	0	(Japan Football Association) Kashima Antlers
3	DF	Kosuke Ota	23 July 1987 (aged 27)	3	0	(Japan Football Association) FC Tokyo
4	MF	Keisuke Honda	13 June 1986 (aged 28)	65	24	(Italian Football Federation) Milan
5	DF	Yuto Nagatomo	12 September 1986 (aged 28)	76	3	(Italian Football Federation) Internazionale
6	DF	Masato Morishige	21 May 1987 (aged 27)	17	1	(Japan Football Association) FC Tokyo
7	MF	Yasuhito Endō	28 January 1980 (aged 34)	148	14	(Japan Football Association) Gamba Osaka
8	MF	Hiroshi Kiyotake	12 November 1989 (aged 25)	26	1	(German Football Association) Hannover 96
9	FW	Shinji Okazaki	16 April 1986 (aged 28)	84	40	(German Football Association) Mainz 05
10	MF	Shinji Kagawa	17 March 1989 (aged 25)	63	19	(German Football Association) Borussia Dortmund
11	FW	Yōhei Toyoda	11 April 1985 (aged 29)	6	1	(Japan Football Association) Sagan Tosu
12	GK	Shusaku Nishikawa	18 June 1986 (aged 28)	15	0	(Japan Football Association) Urawa Red Diamonds
13	FW	Yu Kobayashi	23 September 1987 (aged 27)	2	0	(Japan Football Association) Kawasaki Frontale
14	FW	Yoshinori Muto	15 July 1992 (aged 22)	6	1	(Japan Football Association) FC Tokyo
15	DF	Yasuyuki Konno	25 January 1983 (aged 31)	84	2	(Japan Football Association) Gamba Osaka
16	DF	Tsukasa Shiotani	5 December 1988 (aged 26)	2	0	(Japan Football Association) Sanfrecce Hiroshima
17	MF	Makoto Hasebe (c)	18 January 1984 (aged 30)	83	2	(German Football Association) Eintracht Frankfurt
18	MF	Takashi Inui	2 June 1988 (aged 26)	14	2	(German Football Association) Eintracht Frankfurt
19	DF	Gen Shoji	11 December 1992 (aged 22)	0	0	(Japan Football Association) Kashima Antlers
20	MF	Gaku Shibasaki	28 May 1992 (aged 22)	4	1	(Japan Football Association) Kashima Antlers
21	DF	Gōtoku Sakai	14 March 1991 (aged 23)	19	0	(German Football Association) VfB Stuttgart
22	DF	Maya Yoshida	24 August 1988 (aged 26)	49	3	(The Football Association) Southampton
23	GK	Masaaki Higashiguchi	12 May 1986 (aged 28)	0	0	(Japan Football Association) Gamba Osaka

=== Jordan ===
Coach: (England) Ray Wilkins

The final squad was announced on 18 December 2014.

No.	Pos.	Player	Date of birth (age)	Caps	Goals	Club
1	GK	Amer Shafi (c)	14 February 1982 (aged 32)	117	0	(Jordan Football Association) Al-Wehdat
2	MF	Rajaei Ayed	25 July 1993 (aged 21)	12	0	(Jordan Football Association) Al-Wehdat
3	DF	Tareq Khattab	6 May 1992 (aged 22)	15	0	(Saudi Arabian Football Federation) Al-Shabab
4	MF	Samir Raja	3 September 1994 (aged 20)	1	0	(Jordan Football Association) Al-Wehdat
5	DF	Mohammad Mustafa	29 October 1989 (aged 25)	27	0	(Qatar Football Association) Al-Khor
6	MF	Saeed Murjan	10 February 1990 (aged 24)	38	6	(Jordan Football Association) Al-Ramtha
7	FW	Mahmoud Za'tara	8 January 1991 (aged 24)	3	0	(Jordan Football Association) Al-Wehdat
8	FW	Odai Al-Saify	26 May 1986 (aged 28)	84	10	(Kuwait Football Association) Al-Salmiya
9	MF	Ahmed Sariweh	23 January 1994 (aged 20)	4	0	(Saudi Arabian Football Federation) Al-Qadisiyah
10	FW	Ahmad Hayel	30 October 1983 (aged 31)	49	18	(Kuwait Football Association) Al-Arabi
11	DF	Oday Zahran	29 January 1991 (aged 23)	30	0	(Jordan Football Association) Shabab Al-Ordon
12	GK	Moataz Yaseen	3 November 1982 (aged 32)	7	0	(Jordan Football Association) That Ras
13	MF	Khalil Bani Attiah	8 June 1991 (aged 23)	45	6	(Saudi Arabian Football Federation) Al-Faisaly
14	FW	Abdallah Deeb	10 March 1987 (aged 27)	97	20	(Bahrain Football Association) Al-Riffa
15	MF	Mohammad Al-Dawud	12 April 1992 (aged 22)	6	0	(Bahrain Football Association) Hidd
16	MF	Munther Abu Amarah	24 April 1992 (aged 22)	9	0	(Jordan Football Association) Al-Wehdat
17	MF	Saleh Rateb	18 December 1994 (aged 20)	2	0	(Jordan Football Association) Al-Wehdat
18	MF	Ahmed Elias	9 November 1990 (aged 24)	4	0	(Jordan Football Association) Al-Wehdat
19	DF	Anas Bani Yaseen	29 November 1988 (aged 26)	71	3	(Saudi Arabian Football Federation) Al-Raed
20	FW	Hamza Al-Dardour	12 May 1991 (aged 23)	21	4	(Saudi Arabian Football Federation) Al-Khaleej
21	DF	Mohammad Al-Dmeiri	30 August 1987 (aged 27)	48	2	(Saudi Arabian Football Federation) Al-Ittihad
22	GK	Ahmed Abdel-Sattar	6 July 1984 (aged 30)	7	0	(Jordan Football Association) Al-Jazeera
23	FW	Yousef Al-Rawashdeh	14 March 1990 (aged 24)	13	1	(Jordan Football Association) Al-Ramtha

=== Iraq ===
Coach: Radhi Shenaishil

The final squad was announced on 29 December 2014.

No.	Pos.	Player	Date of birth (age)	Caps	Goals	Club
1	GK	Ali Yasin	9 August 1993 (aged 21)	0	0	(Iraq Football Association) Naft Al-Janoob
2	DF	Ahmed Ibrahim	25 February 1992 (aged 22)	41	0	(United Arab Emirates Football Association) Ajman
3	DF	Ali Bahjat	3 March 1992 (aged 22)	21	0	(Iraq Football Association) Al-Shorta
4	DF	Ali Faez	9 September 1994 (aged 20)	8	0	(Iraq Football Association) Erbil
5	MF	Yaser Kasim	10 May 1991 (aged 23)	5	1	(The Football Association) Swindon Town
6	DF	Ali Adnan	19 December 1993 (aged 21)	27	1	(Turkish Football Federation) Rizespor
7	MF	Amjad Kalaf	20 March 1991 (aged 23)	18	0	(Iraq Football Association) Al-Shorta
8	FW	Justin Meram	4 December 1988 (aged 26)	4	0	(United States Soccer Federation) Columbus Crew
9	MF	Ahmed Yasin	22 April 1991 (aged 23)	30	1	(Swedish Football Association) Örebro
10	FW	Younis Mahmoud (c)	3 February 1983 (aged 31)	131	51	Unattached
11	MF	Humam Tariq	10 February 1996 (aged 18)	23	0	(United Arab Emirates Football Association) Al Dhafra
12	GK	Jalal Hassan	18 May 1991 (aged 23)	14	0	(Iraq Football Association) Erbil
13	MF	Osama Rashid	17 January 1992 (aged 22)	9	0	(Royal Dutch Football Association) Alphense Boys
14	DF	Salam Shaker	31 July 1986 (aged 28)	76	4	(Iraq Football Association) Al-Shorta
15	DF	Dhurgham Ismail	23 May 1994 (aged 20)	17	1	(Iraq Football Association) Al-Shorta
16	FW	Marwan Hussein	26 January 1992 (aged 22)	5	0	(Iraq Football Association) Al-Shorta
17	FW	Alaa Abdul-Zahra	22 December 1987 (aged 27)	78	13	(Iraq Football Association) Al-Shorta
18	DF	Sameh Saeed	26 May 1992 (aged 22)	2	0	(Iraq Football Association) Baghdad
19	MF	Mahdi Kamel	6 January 1995 (aged 20)	10	0	(Iraq Football Association) Al-Shorta
20	GK	Mohammed Hameed	24 January 1993 (aged 21)	10	0	(Iraq Football Association) Al-Shorta
21	MF	Saad Abdul-Amir	19 January 1992 (aged 22)	36	1	(Iraq Football Association) Erbil
22	MF	Ali Husni	23 May 1994 (aged 20)	3	0	(Iraq Football Association) Al-Minaa
23	DF	Waleed Salem	5 January 1992 (aged 23)	23	0	(Iraq Football Association) Al-Shorta

=== Palestine ===
Coach: Ahmed Al Hassan

The final squad was announced on 25 December 2014.

No.	Pos.	Player	Date of birth (age)	Caps	Goals	Club
1	GK	Tawfiq Ali	8 November 1990 (aged 24)	14	0	(Palestinian Football Association) Wadi Al-Nes
2	DF	Raed Fares	6 December 1982 (aged 32)	27	0	(Palestinian Football Association) Thaqafi Tulkarm
3	MF	Hussam Abu Saleh	14 February 1983 (aged 31)	44	3	(Palestinian Football Association) Hilal Al-Quds
4	DF	Ahmed Harbi	16 July 1986 (aged 28)	20	1	(Palestinian Football Association) Al-Am'ary
5	DF	Haytham Theeb^{WD}	3 December 1986 (aged 28)	17	1	(Palestinian Football Association) Hilal Al-Quds
6	DF	Mousa Abu Jazar	28 August 1987 (aged 27)	29	1	(Palestinian Football Association) Shabab Al-Khalil
7	FW	Ashraf Nu'man	29 July 1986 (aged 28)	48	13	(Saudi Arabian Football Federation) Al-Faisaly
8	MF	Hesham Salhe	8 November 1987 (aged 27)	9	0	(Palestinian Football Association) Hilal Al-Quds
9	FW	Khaled Salem	17 November 1989 (aged 25)	12	0	(Palestinian Football Association) Hilal Al-Quds
10	MF	Ismail Al-Amour	2 October 1983 (aged 31)	39	7	(Palestinian Football Association) Hilal Al-Quds
11	FW	Ahmed Maher	22 July 1991 (aged 23)	10	5	(Palestinian Football Association) Shabab Al-Dhahiriya
12	DF	Tamer Salah	3 February 1986 (aged 28)	0	0	(Palestinian Football Association) Hilal Al-Quds
13	MF	Jaka Ihbeisheh	29 August 1986 (aged 28)	1	0	(Football Association of Slovenia) NK Krka
14	DF	Abdullah Jaber	17 February 1993 (aged 21)	10	1	(Palestinian Football Association) Hilal Al-Quds
15	DF	Abdelatif Bahdari	20 February 1984 (aged 30)	29	1	(Jordan Football Association) Al-Wehdat
16	FW	Mahmoud Eid	23 June 1993 (aged 21)	4	1	(Swedish Football Association) Nyköping
17	DF	Alexis Norambuena^{INJ}	31 March 1984 (aged 30)	7	0	(Polish Football Association) GKS Belchatow
18	DF	Mus'ab Al-Batat	21 November 1993 (aged 21)	7	0	(Palestinian Football Association) Shabab Al-Dhahiriya
19	FW	Abdelhamid Abuhabib	8 June 1989 (aged 25)	25	6	(Palestinian Football Association) Markaz Balata
20	MF	Khader Yousef	6 October 1984 (aged 30)	56	1	(Palestinian Football Association) Wadi Al-Nes
21	GK	Ramzi Saleh (c)	8 August 1980 (aged 34)	66	0	unattached
22	GK	Rami Hamadi	20 April 1991 (aged 23)	0	0	(Palestinian Football Association) Shabab Al-Khalil
23	MF	Murad Ismail Said	15 December 1982 (aged 32)	27	1	(Palestinian Football Association) Hilal Al-Quds

== Statistics ==
=== By age ===
==== Players ====
- Oldest: (Australia) Tim Cahill (35 years, 34 days)
- Youngest: (Iraq) Humam Tariq (18 years, 333 days)

==== Goalkeepers ====
- Oldest: (Palestine) Ramzi Saleh (34 years, 154 days)
- Youngest: (Iraq) Mohammed Hameed (21 years, 350 days)

==== Captains ====
- Oldest: (Saudi Arabia) Saud Kariri (34 years, 185 days)
- Youngest: (South Korea) Ki Sung-yueng (25 years, 350 days)

==== Coaches ====
- Oldest: (Portugal) Carlos Queiroz (Iran) (61 years, 314 days)
- Youngest: (Bahrain) Marjan Eid (35 years, 242 days)

=== By club ===
Clubs with 5 or more players represented are listed.

Players	Club
10	(Kuwait) Qadsia
9	(Iraq) Al-Shorta
8	(China) Guangzhou Evergrande, (Palestine) Hilal Al-Quds, (North Korea) Rimyongsu, (Jordan) Al-Wehdat, (Saudi Arabia) Al-Hilal
7	(Oman) Al-Oruba, (Qatar) Al-Sadd
6	(United Arab Emirates) Al Ain, (Bahrain) Al-Muharraq, (Bahrain) Al-Riffa, (Saudi Arabia) Al-Nassr, (Saudi Arabia) Al-Ahli, (North Korea) April 25, (Qatar) El-Jaish, (China) Jiangsu Sainty, (Qatar) Lekhwiya
5	(United Arab Emirates) Al-Ahli, (Saudi Arabia) Al-Shabab, (Oman) Fanja, (Uzbekistan) Lokomotiv Tashkent

=== By club nationality ===
Players	AFC clubs
35	Saudi Arabia
33	Qatar
29	(United Arab Emirates) UAE
27	China
23	Kuwait
22	Oman
20	Bahrain
18	Japan, North Korea
17	Palestine
16	Uzbekistan
15	Iraq
14	Iran, Jordan
7	Australia†, South Korea

† Including Nathan Burns who played for Wellington Phoenix, a New Zealand club competing in the A-League.

Players	Clubs outside AFC
13	Germany
10	England†
5	Russia
4	Netherlands
3	Belgium
2	Italy, Spain, Sweden, Turkey, United States, Switzerland†
1	Egypt, Portugal, Slovenia, Poland, Ukraine

† Including Ki Sung-yueng who played for Swansea City, a Wales club competing in the Premier League.

† Including Pak Kwang-ryong who played for FC Vaduz, a Liechtenstein club competing in the Swiss Super League.

=== By club federation ===
Players	Federation
313†	AFC
50	UEFA
2	CONCACAF
1	CAF

^{†} Including Nathan Burns who played for Wellington Phoenix, a New Zealand club competing in the A-League. All other New Zealand clubs are members of the OFC.

=== By representatives of domestic league ===
National squad	Players
China	23
Qatar	23
Saudi Arabia	23
United Arab Emirates	23
Oman	22
Kuwait	21
Bahrain	19
North Korea	18
Palestine	17
Iraq	15
Uzbekistan	14
Iran	13
Japan	13
Jordan	13
Australia	7†
South Korea	5

† Including Nathan Burns who played for Wellington Phoenix, a New Zealand club competing in the A-League.
