= Iran national football team results (2010–2019) =

This is a list of official football games played by Iran national football team between 2010 and 2019.

== 2010 ==
2010 Qatar Friendship Cup

2 January 2010
18:15

Iran	1–0	North Korea
Madanchi 43'	Report

Jassim bin Hamad Stadium, Doha
Attendance: 1,000
Referee: Eddy Maillet (Seychelles)

2011 AFC Asian Cup qualifier

6 January 2010
19:30

Singapore	1–3	Iran
Alam Shah 31'	Report	Aghili 11' (pen.); Madanchi 12'; Rezaei 62'

National Stadium, Singapore
Attendance: 7,356
Referee: Sun Baojie (China)

2011 AFC Asian Cup qualifier

3 March 2010
19:30

Iran	1–0	Thailand
Nekounam 90'	Report

Azadi Stadium, Tehran
Attendance: 17,000
Referee: Abdullah Balideh (Qatar)

Friendly

11 August 2010
19:00

Armenia	1–3	Iran
Mkrtchyan 40'	Report	Aghili 70', 90+3' (pen.); Nosrati 71'

Hrazdan Stadium, Yerevan
Attendance: 10,000
Referee: Levan Kvaratskhelia (Georgia)

Friendly

3 September 2010
19:30

China	0–2	Iran
	Report	Teymourian 38'; Gholami 58'

Hanghai Stadium, Zhengzhou
Attendance: 20,000
Referee: Kim Jong-hyeok (South Korea)

Friendly

7 September 2010
20:00

South Korea	0–1	Iran
	Report	Shojaei 34'

World Cup Stadium, Seoul
Attendance: 38,642
Referee: Subkhiddin Mohd Salleh (Malaysia)

2010 WAFF West Asian Championship – Preliminary round

24 September 2010
17:00

Iran	3–0	Bahrain
Aghili 36', 38'; Oladi 47'	Report

King Abdullah II Stadium, Amman
Attendance: 5,000
Referee: Nasser Darwish (Jordan)

2010 WAFF West Asian Championship – Preliminary round

28 September 2010
17:00

Oman	2–2	Iran
Al-Mukhaini 39'; Al-Qasmi 45'	Report	Meydavoudi 15'; Teymourian 52'

King Abdullah II Stadium, Amman
Attendance: 2,000
Referee: Ko Hyung-jin (South Korea)

2010 WAFF West Asian Championship – Semifinal

1 October 2010
16:00

Iran	2–1	Iraq
Hosseini 57'; Gholami 82'	Report	Karim 69'

King Abdullah II Stadium, Amman
Attendance: 10,000
Referee: Hajime Matsuo (Japan)

2010 WAFF West Asian Championship – Final

3 October 2010
21:00

Iran	1–2	Kuwait
Meydavoudi 90+5'	Report	Mashaan 9'; Nasser 45'

King Abdullah II Stadium, Amman
Attendance: 4,000
Referee: Nasser Darwish (Jordan)

Friendly

7 October 2010
21:00

Iran	0–3	Brazil
	Report	Dani Alves 14'; Pato 69'; Nilmar 90+2'

Zayed Sports City Stadium, Abu Dhabi
Attendance: 14,000
Referee: Fareed Al-Marzouqi (United Arab Emirates)

Friendly

28 December 2010
18:45

Qatar	0–0	Iran
	Report

Khalifa International Stadium, Doha
Attendance: 3,000
Referee: Zsolt Szabó (Hungary)

== 2011 ==
Friendly

2 January 2011
19:15

Iran	1–0	Angola
Nekounam 90+2'	Report

Jassim bin Hamad Stadium, Doha
Attendance: 0

2011 AFC Asian Cup – Preliminary round

11 January 2011
19:15

Iraq	1–2	Iran
Mahmoud 13'	Report	Rezaei 42'; Mobali 84'

Ahmed bin Ali Stadium, Al-Rayyan
Attendance: 10,478
Referee: Ravshan Irmatov (Uzbekistan)

2011 AFC Asian Cup – Preliminary round

15 January 2011
16:15

Iran	1–0	North Korea
Ansarifard 63'	Report

Suheim bin Hamad Stadium, Doha
Attendance: 6,488
Referee: Nawaf Shukralla (Bahrain)

2011 AFC Asian Cup – Preliminary round

19 January 2011
19:15

United Arab Emirates	0–3	Iran
	Report	Afshin 70'; Nouri 83'; Abbas 90+3' (o.g.)

Suheim bin Hamad Stadium, Doha
Attendance: 5,012
Referee: Kim Dong-jin (South Korea)

2011 AFC Asian Cup – Quarterfinal

22 January 2011
19:25

Iran	0–1 (a.e.t.)	South Korea
	Report	Yoon Bit-garam 105+2'

Suheim bin Hamad Stadium, Doha
Attendance: 7,111
Referee: Ravshan Irmatov (Uzbekistan)

Friendly

9 February 2011
20:00

Iran	1–0	Russia
Khalatbari 90'	Report

Zayed Sports City Stadium, Abu Dhabi
Attendance: 5,000
Referee: Ali Al-Badwawi (United Arab Emirates)

Friendly

17 July 2011
19:30

Iran	1–0	Madagascar
Hosseini 18'	Report

Azadi Stadium, Tehran
Attendance: 10,000
Referee: Hedayat Mombini (Iran)

2014 FIFA World Cup qualifier – Second round

23 July 2011
19:30

Iran	4–0	Maldives
Ansarifard 4', 61'; Karimi 68'; Daghighi 86'	Report

Azadi Stadium, Tehran
Attendance: 20,195
Referee: Chaiya Mahapab (Thailand)

2014 FIFA World Cup qualifier – Second round

28 July 2011
21:00

Maldives	0–1	Iran
	Report	Khalatbari 45+1'

Rasmee Dhandu Stadium, Malé
Attendance: 9,000
Referee: Kim Sang-woo (South Korea)

2014 FIFA World Cup qualifier – Third round

2 September 2011
20:00

Iran	3–0	Indonesia
Nekounam 53', 74'; Teymourian 87'	Report

Azadi Stadium, Tehran
Attendance: 75,800
Referee: Masaaki Toma (Japan)

2014 FIFA World Cup qualifier – Third round

6 September 2011
19:30

Qatar	1–1	Iran
El-Sayed 56'	Report	Aghili 46'

Jassim bin Hamad Stadium, Doha
Attendance: 8,000
Referee: Choi Myung-yong (South Korea)

Friendly

5 October 2011
19:30

Iran	7–0	Palestine
Ghazi 45+1'; Ansarifard 50'; Nekounam 55' (pen.); Kazemian 58', 90+1' (pen.); Montazeri 59'; Nouri 70'	Report

Azadi Stadium, Tehran
Attendance: 5,000
Referee: Saeid Mozaffarizadeh (Iran)

2014 FIFA World Cup qualifier – Third round

11 October 2011
19:30

Iran	6–0	Bahrain
Hosseini 22'; Jabbari 34'; Aghili 42'; Teymourian 62'; Ansarifard 75'; Rezaei 83'	Report

Azadi Stadium, Tehran
Attendance: 83,130
Referee: Peter Green (Australia)

2014 FIFA World Cup qualifier – Third round

11 November 2011
18:30

Bahrain	1–1	Iran
Al-Ajmi 45+1'	Report	Jabbari 90+3'

National Stadium, Riffa
Attendance: 18,000
Referee: Malik Abdul Bashir (Singapore)

2014 FIFA World Cup qualifier – Third round

15 November 2011
19:00

Indonesia	1–4	Iran
Pamungkas 44'	Report	Meydavoudi 7'; Jabbari 20'; Rezaei 25'; Nekounam 73' (pen.)

Gelora Bung Karno Stadium, Jakarta
Attendance: 6,000
Referee: Tan Hai (China)

== 2012 ==
Friendly

23 February 2012
19:30

Iran	2–2	Jordan
Karimi 67'; Ghazi 90+2'	Report	Hayel 39'; Deeb 55' (pen.)

Zabeel Stadium, Dubai
Attendance: 7,000
Referee: Mohammed Abdulla (United Arab Emirates)

2014 FIFA World Cup qualifier – Third round

29 February 2012
17:00

Iran	2–2	Qatar
Dejagah 4', 50'	Report	Ibrahim 9' (pen.); Kasola 86'

Azadi Stadium, Tehran
Attendance: 51,300
Referee: Ravshan Irmatov (Uzbekistan)

Friendly

27 May 2012
19:00

Albania	1–0	Iran
Vila 60'	Report

İnönü Stadium, Istanbul
Attendance: 2,000
Referee: Hüseyin Göçek (Turkey)

2014 FIFA World Cup qualifier – Fourth round

3 June 2012
19:00

Uzbekistan	0–1	Iran
	Report	Khalatbari 90+4'

JAR Stadium, Tashkent
Attendance: 9,000
Referee: Yuichi Nishimura (Japan)

2014 FIFA World Cup qualifier – Fourth round

12 June 2012
20:00

Iran	0–0	Qatar
	Report

Azadi Stadium, Tehran
Attendance: 100,000
Referee: Peter Green (Australia)

Friendly

15 August 2012
18:30

Tunisia	2–2	Iran
Jemal 56'; Jemâa 83'	Report	Khalatbari 53'; Ghazi 60'

Széktói Stadion, Kecskemét
Attendance: 200
Referee: Mihály Fábián (Hungary)

Friendly

5 September 2012
19:30

Jordan	0–0	Iran
	Report

King Abdullah II Stadium, Amman
Attendance: 3,500
Referee: Ammar Al-Jeneibi (United Arab Emirates)

2014 FIFA World Cup qualifier – Fourth round

11 September 2012
17:00

Lebanon	1–0	Iran
Antar 27'	Report

Camille Chamoun Sports City Stadium, Beirut
Attendance: 14,000
Referee: Tan Hai (China)

2014 FIFA World Cup qualifier – Fourth round

16 October 2012
20:00

Iran	1–0	South Korea
Nekounam 76'	Report

Azadi Stadium, Tehran
Attendance: 99,885
Referee: Malik Abdul Bashir (Singapore)

Friendly

6 November 2012
16:30

Iran	6–1	Tajikistan
Dehnavi 9', 31'; Karimi 13', 32'; Hassanzadeh 49'; Abbasfard 89'	Report	Suvonkulov 67'

Azadi Stadium, Tehran
Attendance: 3,000
Referee: Yadollah Jahanbazi (Iran)

2014 FIFA World Cup qualifier – Fourth round

14 November 2012
20:00

Iran	0–1	Uzbekistan
	Report	Bakayev 71'

Azadi Stadium, Tehran
Attendance: 43,700
Referee: Ali Al-Badwawi (United Arab Emirates)

2012 WAFF West Asian Championship – Preliminary round

9 December 2012
17:25

Iran	0–0	Saudi Arabia
	Report

Al-Sadaqua Walsalam Stadium, Kuwait City
Attendance: 1,200
Referee: Minoru Tojo (Japan)

2012 WAFF West Asian Championship – Preliminary round

12 December 2012
17:25

Iran	0–0	Bahrain
	Report

Al-Sadaqua Walsalam Stadium, Kuwait City
Attendance: 1,000
Referee: Banjar Al-Dosari (Qatar)

2012 WAFF West Asian Championship – Preliminary round

15 December 2012
17:25

Iran	2–1	Yemen
Nazari 41'; Karimi 53'	Report	Al-Worafi 45+1'

Al-Sadaqua Walsalam Stadium, Kuwait City
Attendance: 500
Referee: Ali Sabbagh (Lebanon)

== 2013 ==
2015 AFC Asian Cup qualifier

6 February 2013
15:30

Iran	5–0	Lebanon
Ghoochannejhad 26', 62'; Nekounam 45+1' (pen.), 61' (pen.), 80'	Report

Azadi Stadium, Tehran
Attendance: 19,733
Referee: Yuichi Nishimura (Japan)

2015 AFC Asian Cup qualifier

26 March 2013
19:35

Kuwait	1–1	Iran
Awadh 76' (pen.)	Report	Shojaei 45'

Al-Kuwait Sports Club Stadium, Kuwait City
Attendance: 12,321
Referee: Lee Min-hu (South Korea)

Friendly

22 May 2013
17:00

Oman	3–1	Iran
Al-Muqbali 20'; Al-Mukhaini 29'; Al-Owaisi 61'	Report	Mosalman 90+2'

Sultan Qaboos Sports Complex, Muscat
Attendance: 2,000
Referee: Fahad Al-Kassar (United Arab Emirates)

2014 FIFA World Cup qualifier – Fourth round

4 June 2013
19:15

Qatar	0–1	Iran
	Report	Ghoochannejhad 66'

Jassim bin Hamad Stadium, Doha
Attendance: 11,872
Referee: Malik Abdul Bashir (Singapore)

2014 FIFA World Cup qualifier – Fourth round

11 June 2013
20:00

Iran	4–0	Lebanon
Khalatbari 39'; Nekounam 45+1', 86'; Ghoochannejhad 46'	Report

Azadi Stadium, Tehran
Attendance: 91,300
Referee: Masaaki Toma (Japan)

2014 FIFA World Cup qualifier – Fourth round

18 June 2013
21:00

South Korea	0–1	Iran
	Report	Ghoochannejhad 60'

Munsu Football Stadium, Ulsan
Attendance: 42,243
Referee: Tan Hai (China)

2015 AFC Asian Cup qualifier

15 October 2013
19:00

Iran	2–1	Thailand
Hosseini 67'; Ghoochannejhad 70'	Report	Dangda 80'

Azadi Stadium, Tehran
Attendance: 17,330
Referee: Abdullah Balideh (Qatar)

2015 AFC Asian Cup qualifier

15 November 2013
19:00

Thailand	0–3	Iran
	Report	Dejagah 28'; Ghoochannejhad 42'; Jahanbakhsh 90+5'

Rajamangala Stadium, Bangkok
Attendance: 7,000
Referee: Ben Williams (Australia)

2015 AFC Asian Cup qualifier

19 November 2013
17:30

Lebanon	1–4	Iran
Haidar 79'	Report	Sadeghi 39'; Dejagah 51'; Nekounam 55' (pen.); Ghoochannejhad 64'

Camille Chamoun Sports City Stadium, Beirut
Attendance: 0
Referee: Tan Hai (China)

== 2014 ==
2015 AFC Asian Cup qualifier

3 March 2014
17:30

Iran	3–2	Kuwait
Karimi 2'; Fadhel 61' (o.g.); Ansarifard 90+1'	Report	Ali 18'; Al-Rashidi 89'

Enghelab Stadium, Karaj
Attendance: 7,000
Referee: Dmitriy Mashentsev (Kyrgyzstan)

Friendly

5 March 2014
17:30

Iran	1–2	Guinea
Ghoochannejhad 55'	Report	Constant 34'; Traoré 36'

Azadi Stadium, Tehran
Attendance: 4,000
Referee: Mohammad Reza Akbarian (Iran)

Friendly

18 May 2014
14:00

Iran	0–0	Belarus
	Report

Franz Fekete Stadium, Kapfenberg
Attendance: 3,000
Referee: Markus Hameter (Austria)

Friendly

26 May 2014
18:30

Montenegro	0–0	Iran
	Report

Stadion Hartberg, Hartberg
Attendance: 3,000
Referee: Rene Eisner (Austria)

Friendly

30 May 2014
14:00

Iran	1–1	Angola
Ansarifard 56'	Report	Silva 42'

Stadion Hartberg, Hartberg
Attendance: 2,000
Referee: Alexander Harkam (Austria)

Friendly

8 June 2014
15:00

Trinidad and Tobago	0–2	Iran
	Report	Hajsafi 45+1'; Ghoochannejhad 54'

Corinthians Training Complex, São Paulo
Attendance: 0
Referee: Wilton Sampaio (Brazil)

2014 FIFA World Cup – Preliminary round

16 June 2014
16:00

Iran	0–0	Nigeria
	Report

Arena da Baixada, Curitiba
Attendance: 39,081
Referee: Carlos Vera (Ecuador)

2014 FIFA World Cup – Preliminary round

21 June 2014
13:00

Argentina	1–0	Iran
Messi 90+1'	Report

Estádio Mineirão, Belo Horizonte
Attendance: 57,698
Referee: Milorad Mažić (Serbia)

2014 FIFA World Cup – Preliminary round

25 June 2014
13:00

Bosnia and Herzegovina	3–1	Iran
Džeko 23'; Pjanić 59'; Vršajević 83'	Report	Ghoochannejhad 82'

Arena Fonte Nova, Salvador
Attendance: 48,011
Referee: Carlos Velasco (Spain)

Friendly

18 November 2014
16:25

Iran	1–0	South Korea
Azmoun 82'	Report

Azadi Stadium, Tehran
Attendance: 35,000
Referee: Valentin Kovalenko (Uzbekistan)

== 2015 ==
Friendly

4 January 2015
18:00

Iraq	0–1	Iran
	Report	Azmoun 56'

WIN Stadium, Wollongong
Attendance: 10,000
Referee: Kris Griffiths-Jones (Australia)

2015 AFC Asian Cup – Preliminary round

11 January 2015
20:00

Iran	2–0	Bahrain
Hajsafi 45+1'; Shojaei 71'	Report

Rectangular Stadium, Melbourne
Attendance: 17,712
Referee: Ben Williams (Australia)

2015 AFC Asian Cup – Preliminary round

15 January 2015
20:00

Qatar	0–1	Iran
	Report	Azmoun 52'

Stadium Australia, Sydney
Attendance: 22,672
Referee: Ravshan Irmatov (Uzbekistan)

2015 AFC Asian Cup – Preliminary round

19 January 2015
19:00

Iran	1–0	United Arab Emirates
Ghoochannejhad 90+1'	Report

Brisbane Stadium, Brisbane
Attendance: 11,394
Referee: Ryuji Sato (Japan)

2015 AFC Asian Cup – Quarterfinal

23 January 2015
17:30

Iran	3–3 (a.e.t.)	Iraq
Azmoun 24'; Pouraliganji 103'; Ghoochannejhad 118'	Report	Yasin 56'; Mahmoud 93'; Ismail 116' (pen.)
Penalties
Hajsafi (penalty missed); Pouraliganji (penalty scored); Nekounam (penalty scored); Hosseini (penalty scored); Ghafouri (penalty scored); Jahanbakhsh (penalty scored); Teymourian (penalty scored); Amiri (penalty missed)	6–7	(penalty missed) Abdul-Amir; (penalty scored) Salem; (penalty scored) Ismail; (penalty scored) Adnan; (penalty scored) Mahmoud; (penalty scored) Kasim; (penalty scored) Hussein; (penalty scored) Shaker

Canberra Stadium, Canberra
Attendance: 18,921
Referee: Ben Williams (Australia)

Friendly

26 March 2015
20:00

Iran	2–0	Chile
Nekounam 21'; Amiri 50'	Report

NV Arena, Sankt Pölten
Attendance: 4,000
Referee: Manuel Schüttengruber (Austria)

Friendly

31 March 2015
19:30

Sweden	3–1	Iran
Ibrahimović 11'; Berg 21'; Toivonen 89'	Report	Nekounam 24' (pen.)

Friends Arena, Solna
Attendance: 33,773
Referee: Serdar Gözübüyük (Netherlands)

Friendly

11 June 2015
18:00

Uzbekistan	0–1	Iran
	Report	Torabi 90+4'

Bunyodkor Stadium, Tashkent
Attendance: 15,000
Referee: Vladislav Tseytlin (Uzbekistan)

2018 FIFA World Cup qualifier – Second round

16 June 2015
18:00

Turkmenistan	1–1	Iran
Mingazow 45+1'	Report	Azmoun 4'

Sport Toplumy Stadium, Daşoguz
Attendance: 10,000
Referee: Jameel Juma (Bahrain)

2018 FIFA World Cup qualifier – Second round

3 September 2015
19:00

Iran	6–0	Guam
Dejagah 10' (pen.); Taremi 31', 65'; Azmoun 34', 41'; Torabi 89'	Report

Azadi Stadium, Tehran
Attendance: 11,232
Referee: Khamis Al-Marri (Qatar)

2018 FIFA World Cup qualifier – Second round

8 September 2015
19:00

India	0–3 Awarded	Iran
	Report	Azmoun 29'; Teymourian 47'; Taremi 50'

Sree Kanteerava Stadium, Bangalore
Attendance: 14,500
Referee: Ammar Al-Jeneibi (United Arab Emirates)

* FIFA awarded Iran a 3–0 win as a result of India fielding the ineligible player Eugeneson Lyngdoh. The match initially ended 3–0 to Iran.

2018 FIFA World Cup qualifier – Second round

8 October 2015
18:30

Oman	1–1	Iran
Al-Mukhaini 52'	Report	Hosseini 71'

Sultan Qaboos Sports Complex, Muscat
Attendance: 12,400
Referee: Valentin Kovalenko (Uzbekistan)

Friendly

13 October 2015
17:00

Iran	1–1	Japan
Torabi 45+2'	Report	Muto 48'

Azadi Stadium, Tehran
Attendance: 15,000
Referee: Yaqoob Abdulbaki (Oman)

2018 FIFA World Cup qualifier – Second round

12 November 2015
15:00

Iran	3–1	Turkmenistan
Pouraliganji 6'; Ezzatollahi 64'; Dejagah 83' (pen.)	Report	Saparow 62'

Azadi Stadium, Tehran
Attendance: 35,800
Referee: Kim Dong-jin (South Korea)

2018 FIFA World Cup qualifier – Second round

17 November 2015
15:30

Guam	0–6	Iran
	Report	Taremi 12', 63'; Kamyabinia 30'; Rezaeian 49'; Shojaei 51' (pen.); Ansarifard 53'

National Training Center, Dededo
Attendance: 2,087
Referee: Ho Wai Sing (Hong Kong)

== 2016 ==
2018 FIFA World Cup qualifier – Second round

24 March 2016
19:00

Iran	4–0	India
Hajsafi 33' (pen.), 66' (pen.); Azmoun 61'; Jahanbakhsh 78'	Report

Azadi Stadium, Tehran
Attendance: 29,160
Referee: Võ Minh Trí (Vietnam)

2018 FIFA World Cup qualifier – Second round

29 March 2016
19:00

Iran	2–0	Oman
Azmoun 16', 23'	Report

Azadi Stadium, Tehran
Attendance: 33,850
Referee: Minoru Tojo (Japan)

Friendly

2 June 2016
19:00

Macedonia	1–3	Iran
Trajkovski 10'	Report	Azmoun 8', 20', 60'

Philip II Arena, Skopje
Attendance: 1,000
Referee: Neil Doyle (Republic of Ireland)

Friendly

7 June 2016
21:00

Iran	6–0	Kyrgyzstan
Shojaei 6' (pen.); Taremi 25'; Torabi 29'; Ansarifard 68', 90+1'; Azmoun 87'	Report

Azadi Stadium, Tehran
Attendance: 10,000
Referee: Mahmood Al-Majarafi (Oman)

2018 FIFA World Cup qualifier – Third round

1 September 2016
21:00

Iran	2–0	Qatar
Ghoochannejhad 90+4'; Jahanbakhsh 90+6'	Report

Azadi Stadium, Tehran
Attendance: 78,000
Referee: Hettikamkanamge Perera (Sri Lanka)

2018 FIFA World Cup qualifier – Third round

6 September 2016
19:35

China	0–0	Iran
	Report

Olympic Sports Center Stadium, Shenyang
Attendance: 35,776
Referee: Adham Makhadmeh (Jordan)

2018 FIFA World Cup qualifier – Third round

6 October 2016
18:00

Uzbekistan	0–1	Iran
	Report	Hosseini 27'

Bunyodkor Stadium, Tashkent
Attendance: 34,000
Referee: Ben Williams (Australia)

2018 FIFA World Cup qualifier – Third round

11 October 2016
18:15

Iran	1–0	South Korea
Azmoun 25'	Report

Azadi Stadium, Tehran
Attendance: 75,800
Referee: Ryuji Sato (Japan)

Friendly

10 November 2016
18:00

Iran	8–1	Papua New Guinea
Dejagah 14'; Taremi 38'; Ghoochannejhad 47', 58', 71'; Ansarifard 54', 59'; Rezaeian 85'	Report	Dabinyaba 46'

Shah Alam Stadium, Shah Alam
Attendance: 100

2018 FIFA World Cup qualifier – Third round

15 November 2016
20:45

Syria	0–0	Iran
	Report

Tuanku Abdul Rahman Stadium, Seremban, Malaysia
Attendance: 4,560
Referee: Ali Sabah (Iraq)

== 2017 ==
Friendly

18 March 2017
11:00

Iran	0–1	Iraq
	Report	Abdul-Amir 72' (pen.)

Azadi Stadium, Tehran
Attendance: 0
Referee: Mooud Bonyadifard (Iran)

2018 FIFA World Cup qualifier – Third round

23 March 2017
19:00

Qatar	0–1	Iran
	Report	Taremi 52'

Jassim bin Hamad Stadium, Doha
Attendance: 10,237
Referee: Liu Kwok Man (Hong Kong)

2018 FIFA World Cup qualifier – Third round

28 March 2017
16:30

Iran	1–0	China
Taremi 46'	Report

Azadi Stadium, Tehran
Attendance: 78,115
Referee: Muhammad Taqi Al-Jaafari (Singapore)

Friendly

4 June 2017
20:30

Montenegro	1–2	Iran
Jovetić 32'	Report	Azmoun 10', 60'

Podgorica City Stadium, Podgorica
Attendance: 4,500
Referee: Dejan Jakimovski (Macedonia)

2018 FIFA World Cup qualifier – Third round

12 June 2017
21:15

Iran	2–0	Uzbekistan
Azmoun 23'; Taremi 88'	Report

Azadi Stadium, Tehran
Attendance: 59,730
Referee: Ahmed Al-Kaf (Oman)

2018 FIFA World Cup qualifier – Third round

31 August 2017
21:00

South Korea	0–0	Iran
	Report

World Cup Stadium, Seoul
Attendance: 63,124
Referee: Peter Green (Australia)

2018 FIFA World Cup qualifier – Third round

5 September 2017
19:30

Iran	2–2	Syria
Azmoun 45', 64'	Report	Haj Mohamad 13'; Al-Somah 90+3'

Azadi Stadium, Tehran
Attendance: 62,165
Referee: Ryuji Sato (Japan)

Friendly

5 October 2017
18:30

Iran	2–0	Togo
Ansarifard 51', 60'	Report

Azadi Stadium, Tehran
Attendance: 5,000
Referee: Yaqoob Abdulbaki (Oman)

Friendly

10 October 2017
19:00

Russia	1–1	Iran
Poloz 74'	Report	Azmoun 57'

Kazan Arena, Kazan
Attendance: 33,270
Referee: Milorad Mažić (Serbia)

Friendly

9 November 2017
19:30

Iran	2–1	Panama
Dejagah 15' (pen.); Ghoddos 18'	Report	Torres 38' (pen.)

Liebenauer Stadium, Graz
Attendance: 1,000
Referee: Manuel Schüttengruber (Austria)

Friendly

13 November 2017
13:00

Venezuela	0–1	Iran
	Report	Jahanbakhsh 57'

Stadion de Goffert, Nijmegen
Attendance: 100
Referee: Pol van Boekel (Netherlands)

== 2018 ==
Friendly

17 March 2018
15:30

Iran	4–0	Sierra Leone
Khanzadeh 14'; Gholizadeh 15', 47'; Rezaei 35'	Report

Azadi Stadium, Tehran
Attendance: 3,000
Referee: Mooud Bonyadifard (Iran)

Friendly

23 March 2018
19:15

Tunisia	1–0	Iran
Mohammadi 71' (o.g.)	Report

Stade Olympique de Radès, Radès
Attendance: 10,000
Referee: Ibrahim Nour El-Din (Egypt)

Friendly

27 March 2018
18:00

Iran	2–1	Algeria
Azmoun 11'; Taremi 19'	Report	Chafaï 56'

Liebenauer Stadium, Graz
Attendance: 5,000
Referee: Julian Weinberger (Austria)

Friendly

19 May 2018
21:00

Iran	1–0	Uzbekistan
Cheshmi 17'	Report

Azadi Stadium, Tehran
Attendance: 25,000
Referee: Saoud Al-Athbah (Qatar)

Friendly

28 May 2018
21:15

Turkey	2–1	Iran
Tosun 6', 50'	Report	Dejagah 90+2' (pen.)

Başakşehir Fatih Terim Stadium, Istanbul
Attendance: 12,000
Referee: Valentin Kovalenko (Uzbekistan)

Friendly

6 June 2018
18:15

Iran	1–0	Lithuania
Ansarifard 88'	Report

Otkritie Training Arena, Moscow
Attendance: 0
Referee: Aleksei Eskov (Russia)

2018 FIFA World Cup – Preliminary round

15 June 2018
18:00

Morocco	0–1	Iran
	Report	Bouhaddouz 90+5' (o.g.)

Krestovsky Stadium, Saint Petersburg
Attendance: 62,548
Referee: Cüneyt Çakır (Turkey)

2018 FIFA World Cup – Preliminary round

20 June 2018
21:00

Iran	0–1	Spain
	Report	Costa 54'

Kazan Arena, Kazan
Attendance: 42,718
Referee: Andrés Cunha (Uruguay)

2018 FIFA World Cup – Preliminary round

25 June 2018
21:00

Iran	1–1	Portugal
Ansarifard 90+3' (pen.)	Report	Quaresma 45'

Mordovia Arena, Saransk
Attendance: 41,685
Referee: Enrique Cáceres (Paraguay)

Friendly

11 September 2018
20:00

Uzbekistan	0–1	Iran
	Report	Torabi 67'

Milliy Stadium, Tashkent
Attendance: 19,000
Referee: Dmitriy Mashentsev (Kyrgyzstan)

Friendly

16 October 2018
19:30

Iran	2–1	Bolivia
Jahanbakhsh 17'; Torabi 63'	Report	Cardozo 51'

Azadi Stadium, Tehran
Attendance: 20,000
Referee: Ali Shaban (Kuwait)

Friendly

15 November 2018
18:00

Iran	1–0	Trinidad and Tobago
Ansarifard 50'	Report

Azadi Stadium, Tehran
Attendance: 2,000
Referee: Saoud Al-Athbah (Qatar)

Friendly

20 November 2018
18:30

Iran	1–1	Venezuela
Gholizadeh 42'	Report	Machís 35'

Hamad bin Khalifa Stadium, Doha
Attendance: 3,000
Referee: Abdulrahman Al-Jassim (Qatar)

Friendly

24 December 2018
17:00

Palestine	1–1	Iran
Cantillana 90+2'	Report	Taremi 50'

Abdullah bin Khalifa Stadium, Doha
Attendance: 100
Referee: Wathik Mohammed (Iraq)

Friendly

31 December 2018
20:00

Qatar	1–2	Iran
Al-Haydos 42' (pen.)	Report	Taremi 17'; Azmoun 46'

Khalifa International Stadium, Doha
Attendance: 0
Referee: Qasim Al-Hatmi (Oman)

== 2019 ==
2019 AFC Asian Cup – Preliminary round

7 January 2019
20:00

Iran	5–0	Yemen
Taremi 12', 25'; Dejagah 23'; Azmoun 53'; Ghoddos 78'	Report

Mohammed bin Zayed Stadium, Abu Dhabi
Attendance: 5,301
Referee: Ryuji Sato (Japan)

2019 AFC Asian Cup – Preliminary round

12 January 2019
15:00

Vietnam	0–2	Iran
	Report	Azmoun 38', 69'

Al-Nahyan Stadium, Abu Dhabi
Attendance: 10,841
Referee: Muhammad Taqi Al-Jaafari (Singapore)

2019 AFC Asian Cup – Preliminary round

16 January 2019
20:00

Iran	0–0	Iraq
	Report

Al-Maktoum Stadium, Dubai
Attendance: 15,038
Referee: Ravshan Irmatov (Uzbekistan)

2019 AFC Asian Cup – Round of 16

20 January 2019
21:00

Iran	2–0	Oman
Jahanbakhsh 32'; Dejagah 41' (pen.)	Report

Mohammed bin Zayed Stadium, Abu Dhabi
Attendance: 31,945
Referee: César Arturo Ramos (Mexico)

2019 AFC Asian Cup – Quarterfinal

24 January 2019
20:00

China	0–3	Iran
	Report	Taremi 18'; Azmoun 31'; Ansarifard 90+1'

Mohammed bin Zayed Stadium, Abu Dhabi
Attendance: 19,578
Referee: Abdulrahman Al-Jassim (Qatar)

2019 AFC Asian Cup – Semifinal

28 January 2019
18:00

Iran	0–3	Japan
	Report	Osako 56', 67' (pen.); Haraguchi 90+1'

Hazza bin Zayed Stadium, Al-Ain
Attendance: 23,262
Referee: Chris Beath (Australia)

Friendly

6 June 2019
19:45

Iran	5–0	Syria
Jahanbakhsh 30'; Taremi 37', 57', 77'; Sayyadmanesh 89'	Report

Azadi Stadium, Tehran
Attendance: 25,000
Referee: Alireza Faghani (Iran)

Friendly

11 June 2019
20:00

South Korea	1–1	Iran
Hwang Ui-jo 58'	Report	Kim Young-gwon 62' (o.g.)

World Cup Stadium, Seoul
Attendance: 60,213
Referee: Ryuji Sato (Japan)

2022 FIFA World Cup qualifier – Second round

10 September 2019
20:00

Hong Kong	0–2	Iran
	Report	Azmoun 23'; Ansarifard 54'

Hong Kong Stadium, Hong Kong
Attendance: 13,942
Referee: Yudai Yamamoto (Japan)

2022 FIFA World Cup qualifier – Second round

10 October 2019
17:00

Iran	14–0	Cambodia
Nourollahi 5'; Azmoun 11', 35', 44'; Kanaanizadegan 18'; Taremi 22', 54'; Ansarifard 40', 48', 60', 88'; Mohebbi 65', 67'; Mohammadi 85'	Report

Azadi Stadium, Tehran
Attendance: 15,823
Referee: Pranjal Banerjee (India)

2022 FIFA World Cup qualifier – Second round

15 October 2019
19:30

Bahrain	1–0	Iran
Al-Hardan 65' (pen.)	Report

National Stadium, Riffa
Attendance: 14,810
Referee: Valentin Kovalenko (Uzbekistan)

2022 FIFA World Cup qualifier – Second round

14 November 2019
16:00

Iraq	2–1	Iran
Ali 11'; Abbas 90+2'	Report	Nourollahi 25'

International Stadium, Amman
Attendance: 13,752
Referee: Hettikamkanamge Perera (Sri Lanka)

== Statistics ==
=== Results by year ===
Year	Pld	W	D	L	GF	GA	GD
2010	12	8	2	2	19	10	+9
2011	15	12	2	1	36	5	+31
2012	14	4	7	3	16	11	+5
2013	9	7	1	1	22	6	+16
2014	10	3	4	3	9	9	0
2015	15	10	4	1	33	10	+23
2016	10	8	2	0	27	2	+25
2017	11	7	3	1	14	6	+8
2018	15	9	3	3	19	10	+9
2019	12	7	2	3	35	7	+28
Total	123	75	30	18	230	76	+154

=== Managers ===
Name	First match	Last match	Pld	W	D	L	GF	GA	GD
(Iran) Afshin Ghotbi	2 January 2010	22 January 2011	17	12	2	3	26	12	+14
(Iran) Alireza Mansourian	9 February 2011	9 February 2011	1	1	0	0	1	0	+1
(Portugal) Carlos Queiroz	17 July 2011	28 January 2019	99	59	27	13	180	60	+120
(Belgium) Marc Wilmots	6 June 2019	14 November 2019	6	3	1	2	23	4	+19
Total			123	75	30	18	230	76	+154

=== Opponents ===
Iran national football team head-to-head records (2010–2019)
Team	Pld	W	D	L	GF	GA	GD	Pts	Confederation
Albania	1	0	0	1	0	1	–1	0	UEFA
Algeria	1	1	0	0	2	1	+1	3	CAF
Angola	2	1	1	0	2	1	+1	4	CAF
Argentina	1	0	0	1	0	1	–1	0	CONMEBOL
Armenia	1	1	0	0	3	1	+2	3	UEFA
Bahrain	6	3	2	1	12	2	+10	11	AFC
Belarus	1	0	1	0	0	0	0	1	UEFA
Bolivia	1	1	0	0	2	1	+1	3	CONMEBOL
Bosnia and Herzegovina	1	0	0	1	1	3	–2	0	UEFA
Brazil	1	0	0	1	0	3	–3	0	CONMEBOL
Cambodia	1	1	0	0	14	0	+14	3	AFC
Chile	1	1	0	0	2	0	+2	3	CONMEBOL
China	4	3	1	0	6	0	+6	10	AFC
Guam	2	2	0	0	12	0	+12	6	AFC
Guinea	1	0	0	1	1	2	–1	0	CAF
Hong Kong	1	1	0	0	2	0	+2	3	AFC
India	2	2	0	0	7	0	+7	6	AFC
Indonesia	2	2	0	0	7	1	+6	6	AFC
Iraq	7	3	2	2	9	8	+1	11	AFC
Japan	2	0	1	1	1	4	–3	1	AFC
Jordan	2	0	2	0	2	2	0	2	AFC
Kuwait	3	1	1	1	5	5	0	4	AFC
Kyrgyzstan	1	1	0	0	6	0	+6	3	AFC
Lebanon	4	3	0	1	13	2	+11	9	AFC
Lithuania	1	1	0	0	1	0	+1	3	UEFA
Madagascar	1	1	0	0	1	0	+1	3	CAF
Maldives	2	2	0	0	5	0	+5	6	AFC
Montenegro	2	1	1	0	2	1	+1	4	UEFA
Morocco	1	1	0	0	1	0	+1	3	CAF
Nigeria	1	0	1	0	0	0	0	1	CAF
North Korea	2	2	0	0	2	0	+2	6	AFC
North Macedonia	1	1	0	0	3	1	+2	3	UEFA
Oman	5	2	2	1	8	6	+2	8	AFC
Palestine	2	1	1	0	8	1	+7	4	AFC
Panama	1	1	0	0	2	1	+1	3	CONCACAF
Papua New Guinea	1	1	0	0	8	1	+7	3	OFC
Portugal	1	0	1	0	1	1	0	1	UEFA
Qatar	9	5	4	0	10	4	+6	19	AFC
Russia	2	1	1	0	2	1	+1	4	UEFA
Saudi Arabia	1	0	1	0	0	0	0	1	AFC
Sierra Leone	1	1	0	0	4	0	+4	3	CAF
Singapore	1	1	0	0	3	1	+2	3	AFC
South Korea	8	5	2	1	6	2	+4	17	AFC
Spain	1	0	0	1	0	1	–1	0	UEFA
Sweden	1	0	0	1	1	3	–2	0	UEFA
Syria	3	1	2	0	7	2	+5	5	AFC
Tajikistan	1	1	0	0	6	1	+5	3	AFC
Thailand	3	3	0	0	6	1	+5	9	AFC
Togo	1	1	0	0	2	0	+2	3	CAF
Trinidad and Tobago	2	2	0	0	3	0	+3	6	CONCACAF
Tunisia	2	0	1	1	2	3	–1	1	CAF
Turkey	1	0	0	1	1	2	–1	0	UEFA
Turkmenistan	2	1	1	0	4	2	+2	4	AFC
United Arab Emirates	2	2	0	0	4	0	+4	6	AFC
Uzbekistan	7	6	0	1	7	1	+6	18	AFC
Venezuela	2	1	1	0	2	1	+1	4	CONMEBOL
Vietnam	1	1	0	0	2	0	+2	3	AFC
Yemen	2	2	0	0	7	1	+6	6	AFC
Total	123	77	28	18	203	63	+140	259	
