= Al-Mukhaini =

Al-Mukhaini (Arabic: المخيني) is an Arabic surname, commonly used in Oman. Notable people with the surname include:

- Abdul Salam Al-Mukhaini (1988–2025), Omani footballer
- Abdullah Al-Mukhaini (born 1986), Omani footballer
- Ahmed Al-Mukhaini (born 1985), Omani footballer
- Ahmed Hadid Al-Mukhaini (born 1984), Omani footballer
- Ibrahim Al-Mukhaini (footballer, born 1987) (born 1987), Omani footballer
- Ibrahim Al-Mukhaini (footballer, born 1997) (born 1997), Omani footballer
- Mohammed Al-Mukhaini (born 1982), Omani footballer
- Osama Hadid Al-Mukhaini (born 1987), Omani footballer
- Saad Al-Mukhaini (born 1987), Omani footballer
- Yaqoob Juma Al-Mukhaini (born 1982), Omani footballer
