= 2010 WAFF Championship =

6th WAFF Championship, held in Jordan in 2010

Tournament details
- Host country: Jordan
- Dates: 24 September – 3 October
- Teams: 9 (from 1 confederation)
- Venue: 1 (in 1 host city)

Final positions
- Champions: Kuwait (1st title)
- Runners-up: Iran

Tournament statistics
- Matches played: 12
- Goals scored: 36 (3 per match)
- Attendance: 92,000 (7,667 per match)
- Top scorer: (Yemen) Ali Al-Nono (4 goals)

The 2010 WAFF Championship was the 6th edition of the West Asian Football Federation Championship, an international tournament for selected West Asian countries and territories. It was hosted by Jordan, after Lebanon was deemed not capable of hosting. The competition was eventually won for the first time by Kuwait, after beating the three-time defending champions, Iran.

== Participants ==
9 members from 13 members of WAFF participated in this tournament.

Country	Appearance	Previous best performance
Bahrain	1st	None
Iran	6th	Champions (2000, 2004, 2007, 2008)
Iraq	5th	Champions (2002)
Jordan (hosts)	6th	Runners-up (2002, 2008)
Kuwait	1st	None
Oman	2nd	Group Stage (2008)
Palestine	6th	Group stage (2000, 2002, 2004, 2007, 2008)
Syria	6th	Runners-up (2000, 2004)
Yemen	1st	None

Note:

- Saudi Arabia, Lebanon, Qatar and United Arab Emirates did not enter.

== Draw ==
Nine teams entered the tournament and were drawn into three groups of three teams. The draw for the competition was made on Thursday 1 July 2010.

Group A	Group B	Group C
Iran (Holders); Bahrain; Oman	Jordan (Hosts); Syria; Kuwait	Iraq; Yemen; Palestine

== Venue ==
2010 WAFF Championship (Jordan)	Amman
2010 WAFF Championship (Jordan)	King Abdullah II Stadium
2010 WAFF Championship (Jordan)	Capacity: 20,000

== Group stage ==
=== Group A ===
Pos	Team	Pld	W	D	L	GF	GA	GD	Pts
1	Iran	2	1	1	0	5	2	+3	4
2	Bahrain	2	1	0	1	2	3	−1	3
3	Oman	2	0	1	1	2	4	−2	1

24 September 2010
19:00 GMT

Iran	3–0	Bahrain
Aghili 36', 38'; Oladi 47'	Report

King Abdullah II Stadium, Amman
Attendance: 8,000
Referee: Nasser Al-Ghafari (Jordan)

26 September 2010
15:00 GMT

Bahrain	2–0	Oman
Abdullatif 63', 67'	Report

King Abdullah II Stadium, Amman
Attendance: 1,000

28 September 2010
15:00 GMT

Oman	2–2	Iran
Hadid 40'; Abdul-Karim 45'	Report	Meydavoudi 17'; Teymourian 53'

King Abdullah II Stadium, Amman
Attendance: 4,000
Referee: Ko Hyung-Jin (South Korea)

=== Group B ===
Pos	Team	Pld	W	D	L	GF	GA	GD	Pts
1	Kuwait	2	1	1	0	4	3	+1	4
2	Jordan (H)	2	0	2	0	3	3	0	2
3	Syria	2	0	1	1	2	3	−1	1

(H) Hosts
24 September 2010
15:00 GMT

Jordan	1–1	Syria
Abdullah Deeb 13'	Report	Al-Zino 82'

King Abdullah II Stadium, Amman
Attendance: 18,000

26 September 2010
19:00 GMT

Syria	1–2	Kuwait
Al-Omaier 83'	Report	Rashed 53'; Al-Moussawi 71'

King Abdullah II Stadium, Amman
Attendance: 5,000

28 September 2010
19:00 GMT

Kuwait	2–2	Jordan
Nasser 60'; Al Mejmed 78'	Report	Abdel-Fattah 38', 51'

King Abdullah II Stadium, Amman
Attendance: 18,000

=== Group C ===
Pos	Team	Pld	W	D	L	GF	GA	GD	Pts
1	Iraq	2	2	0	0	5	1	+4	6
2	Yemen	2	1	0	1	4	3	+1	3
3	Palestine	2	0	0	2	1	6	−5	0

25 September 2010
17:00 GMT

Iraq	2–1	Yemen
Samal 49'; Hawar 72'	Report	Al-Nono 10'

King Abdullah II Stadium, Amman
Attendance: 8,000

27 September 2010
17:00 GMT

Yemen	3–1	Palestine
Al-Nono 43' (pen.), 83'; Thabit 63'	Report	Obeid 79'

King Abdullah II Stadium, Amman
Attendance: 10,000
Referee: Nasser Al-Ghafari (Jordan)

29 September 2010
17:00 GMT

Palestine	0–3	Iraq
		Karim 15', 76'; Akram 86' (pen.)

King Abdullah II Stadium, Amman
Attendance: 14,000

=== Ranking of second-placed teams ===
Pos	Grp	Team	Pld	W	D	L	GF	GA	GD	Pts
1	C	Yemen	2	1	0	1	4	3	+1	3
2	A	Bahrain	2	1	0	1	2	3	−1	3
3	B	Jordan	2	0	2	0	3	3	0	2

== Knockout phase ==
=== Semi-finals ===
1 October 2010
13:00 GMT

Iran	2–1	Iraq
Hosseini 58'; Gholami 84'		Karim 71'

King Abdullah II Stadium, Amman
Attendance: 12,000
Referee: Hajime Matsuo (Japan)

1 October 2010
18:00 GMT

Kuwait	1–1	Yemen
Al-Rashidi 73'		Al-Nono 55'
Penalties
	4–3

King Abdullah II Stadium, Amman
Attendance: 3,000

=== Final ===
3 October 2010
18:00 GMT

Iran	1–2	Kuwait
Meydavoudi 90+5'		Mashaan 10'; Nasser 40'

King Abdullah II Stadium, Amman
Attendance: 15,000
Referee: Nasser Al-Ghafari (Jordan)

== Champion ==
2010 WAFF Championship champion

Kuwait
First title

== Goalscorers ==
4 goals

- (Yemen) Ali Al-Nono

3 goals

- (Iraq) Mustafa Karim

2 goals

- (Bahrain) Ismaeel Abdullatif
- (Iran) Hadi Aghili
- (Iran) Milad Meydavoudi
- (Jordan) Hassan Abdel-Fattah
- (Kuwait) Yousef Nasser

1 goal

- (Iran) Mohammad Gholami
- (Iran) Jalal Hosseini
- (Iran) Mehrdad Oladi
- (Iran) Andranik Teymourian
- (Iraq) Nashat Akram
- (Iraq) Hawar Mulla Mohammed
- (Iraq) Samal Saeed
- (Jordan) Abdullah Deeb
- (Kuwait) Soud Al-Magmed
- (Kuwait) Abdul-Aziz Al-Mashaan
- (Kuwait) Hussain Al-Moussawi
- (Kuwait) Ahmed Saad Al-Rashidi
- (Kuwait) Mohammed Rashed
- (Oman) Yaqoob Abdul-Karim
- (Oman) Osama Hadid
- (Palestine) Suleiman Obeid
- (Syria) Ahmad Omaier
- (Syria) Mohamed Al Zeno
- (Yemen) Haitham Thabit

== Sponsors ==
- Fly Emirates
- Nike
- Toshiba
- Nikon
- Epson
- Arabic and Iranian Sponsors
