= Khalid Abdulraouf =

Qatari footballer (born 1989)

Personal information
- Full name: Khaled Abdulraouf Al Zereiqi
- Date of birth: 14 November 1990 (age 35)
- Place of birth: Doha, Qatar
- Height: 1.80 m (5 ft 11 in)
- Position: Midfielder

Team information
- Current team: Al-Markhiya
- Number: 12

Youth career
- 2006–2009: Al Sadd SC

Senior career*
Years	Team	Apps	(Gls)
2009–2012	Al Sadd SC	20	(4)
2011–2012	→ Al-Khor (loan)	17	(2)
2012–2017	El Jaish	83	(2)
2017–2019	Al-Gharafa	22	(0)
2019–2021	Qatar	14	(0)
2021–2025	Umm Salal	64	(0)
2025–	Al-Markhiya	2	(0)

International career
2014–	Qatar	4	(0)
- * Club domestic league appearances and goals

Khaled Abdulraouf Al Zereiqi (خالد عبد الرؤوف الزريقي; born 14 November 1989) is a Qatari footballer who plays for Al-Markhiya as a midfielder.

== Club career ==
Abdulraouf was brought up to play for El Jaish SC Doha at the age of 23. He began his career as an outside midfielder and has transitioned to a defensive midfield position. Abdulraouf has had six career starts with El Jaish with more time likely after his appearance with the Qatar national team in 2014. After a recent injury, Abdulraouf is currently benched for all upcoming club matches, but is expected for recovery.

== International career ==
In 2014, Abdulraouf along with six of his teammates from El Jaish SC were pulled up to the national team at the request of head coach Fahad Thani. Since this movement, the Qatar national team has competed in one friendly in which Khaled did not receive time. With the 2014 FIFA World Cup in Brazil fast approaching, the number of friendly and official matches will rise come August once this world cup which Qatar did not qualify for is finished. Abdulraouf is expected to receive substantial time increases after their friendly on 13 August as they proceed into their first official matches in early September.

== Career statistics ==
=== Club ===
As of 27 December 2014

Club performance			League		Cup		Continental		Total	
Season	Club	League	Apps	Goals	Apps	Goals	Apps	Goals	Apps	Goals
Qatar			League		Emir of Qatar Cup		AFC Champions League		Total	
2012–13	El Jaish	Qatar Stars League	6	0	0	0	3	0	9	0
2013–14	El Jaish	Qatar Stars League	20	0	2	0	0	0	22	0
2014–15	El Jaish	Qatar Stars League	11	0	0	0	0	0	11	0
Total	Qatar		37	0	2	0	3	0	42	0
Total	Career total		37	0	2	0	3	0	42	0

=== International ===
Qatar
Year	Apps	Goals
2014	4	0
Total	4	0
