= Mohammad Rashed =

Kuwaiti footballer

Personal information
- Full name: Mohammad Rashed Sanad Al Fadhli
- Date of birth: 1 July 1987 (age 39)
- Place of birth: Kuwait City, Kuwait
- Height: 1.74 m (5 ft 8 1/2 in)
- Position: Defender

Youth career
- 1997–2006: Al Qadsia

Senior career*
Years	Team	Apps	(Gls)
2006–2016	Al Qadsia	99	(6)
2014–2015	→ Al Naser (loan)	15	(1)
2016	→ Al Fahaheel (loan)	3	(0)
2017	AL-Arabi SC	5	(0)
Total		119	(7)

International career^{‡}
2008–2013	Kuwait	52	(0)
- * Club domestic league appearances and goals as of 19 October 2017 ‡ National team caps and goals as of 19 November 2013

Mohammad Rashed Sanad Al Fadhli (Arabic: محمد راشد سند الفضلي, born 1 July 1987) is a Kuwaiti footballer who is a defender for the Kuwaiti Premier League club AL-Arabi SC.
