= Amer Said Al-Shatri =

Omani footballer (born 1990)

Amer Said
Personal information
- Full name: Amer Said Al-Shatri
- Date of birth: 5 April 1990 (age 36)
- Place of birth: Muscat, Oman
- Position: Midfielder

Team information
- Current team: Mirbat

Senior career*
Years	Team	Apps	(Gls)
2007–2013	Al-Nasr	117	(0)
2010–2011	→ Al-Orouba (loan)		
2013–2017	Dhofar	51	(1)
2017–	Mirbat		

International career
2010	Oman U23	4	(0)
2010–2015	Oman	3	(0)
- * Club domestic league appearances and goals

Amer Said Al-Shatri (Arabic: عامر سعيد الشاطري; born 5 April 1990) is an Omani international footballer who plays as a midfielder for Omani club Mirbat.

== Club career ==
He previously played for Salalah-based club Al-Nasr. On 16 July 2013, he signed a contract with rivals Dhofar.

== International career ==
Amer was selected for Oman for the first time in 2010. He made his first appearance for Oman on 11 August 2010 in a friendly match against Kazakhstan.

== Honours ==
=== Club ===
- With Dhofar
  - Baniyas SC International Tournament: Winner 2014
