= Mohannad Al-Zaabi =

Omani footballer (born 1992)

Personal information
- Full name: Mohannad Obaid Al-Zaabi
- Date of birth: 25 October 1992 (age 34)
- Place of birth: Al-Suwaiq, Oman
- Height: 1.85 m (6 ft 1 in)
- Position: Goalkeeper

Team information
- Current team: Al-Khaboora
- Number: 26

Youth career
- 2007–2011: Al-Khaboora

Senior career*
Years	Team	Apps	(Gls)
2011–2012	Fanja	17	(0)
2012–	Al-Khaboora	39	(0)

International career
2010–2011	Oman U-23	6	(0)
2013–	Oman	2	(0)
- * Club domestic league appearances and goals

Mohannad Obaid Al-Zaabi (Arabic: مهند بن عبيد الزعابي; born 25 October 1992), commonly known as Mohannad Al-Zaabi, is an Omani footballer who plays as a goalkeeper for Al-Khaburah SC.

== International career ==
Mohannad is part of the first team squad of the Oman national football team. He was selected for the national team for the first time in 2013. He earned his first international call-up for Oman on 18 June 2013 against Jordan in a crucial 2014 FIFA World Cup qualification match when he was the substitute goalkeeper.
