= Yaqoob Al-Qasmi =

Omani footballer

Yaqoob Abdul-Karim
Personal information
- Full name: Yaqoob Abdul-Karim Salim Al-Qasmi
- Date of birth: 16 February 1990 (age 36)
- Place of birth: Oman
- Position: Striker

Team information
- Current team: Saham
- Number: 16

Youth career
- 2005–2008: Saham

Senior career*
Years	Team	Apps	(Gls)
2006–????	Saham	94	(14)

International career
2007–2015	Oman	36	(5)
- * Club domestic league appearances and goals

Yaqoob Abdul-Karim Salim Al Qasmi (Arabic: يعقوب بن عبدالكريم القاسمي; born 4 September 1990), commonly known as Yaqoob Al-Qasmi, is an Omani footballer who plays for Saham SC.

== Club career ==
On 23 July 2013, he agreed a one-year contract extension with Saham SC. On 2 July 2014, he agreed a one-year contract extension with 2014 GCC Champions League runners-up Saham SC.

=== Club career statistics ===
Club	Season	Division	League		Cup		Continental (Note: Includes appearances in the AFC Cup)		Other (Note: Includes goal in the GCC Champions League)		Total	
Club	Season	Division	Apps	Goals	Apps	Goals	Apps	Goals	Apps	Goals	Apps	Goals
Saham	2008–09	Oman Professional League	-	1	-	0	0	0	-	0	-	3
Saham	2009–10	Oman Professional League	-	2	-	3	6	1	-	0	-	3
Saham	2012–13	Oman Professional League	-	8	-	3	0	0	-	0	-	11
Saham	2013–14	Oman Professional League	-	3	-	0	0	0	-	1	-	4
Saham	Total		-	14	-	6	6	1	-	1	-	22
Career total			-	14	-	6	6	1	-	1	-	22

== International career ==
Yaqoob is part of the first team squad of the Oman national football team. He was selected for the national team for the first time in 2009. He made his first appearance for Oman on 17 November 2009 in a friendly match against Brazil. He has made appearances in the 20th Arabian Gulf Cup, the 2011 AFC Asian Cup qualification, the 2012 WAFF Championship, the 2014 FIFA World Cup qualification, the 21st Arabian Gulf Cup and the 2015 AFC Asian Cup qualification.

== National team career statistics ==
=== Goals for Senior National Team ===
Scores and results list Oman's goal tally first.

#	Date	Venue	Opponent	Score	Result	Competition
1.	31 December 2009	National Stadium, Kallang, Singapore	Singapore	2–0	4–1	Friendly
2.	28 September 2010	Amman International Stadium, Amman, Jordan	Iran	2–1	2–2	2010 WAFF Championship
3.	30 January 2013	Sultan Qaboos Sports Complex, Muscat, Oman	China	1–0	1–0	Friendly
4.	26 March 2015	Al-Seeb Stadium, Seeb, Oman	Malaysia	1–0	6–0	Friendly
5.	26 March 2015	Al-Seeb Stadium, Seeb, Oman	Malaysia	5–0	6–0	Friendly

== Honours ==
=== Club ===
- With Saham

- Omani Super Cup (1): 2010
- Oman Professional League Cup (1): 2013; Runner-up 2012
