= Osama Hadid Al-Mukhaini =

Omani footballer (born 1987)

Osama Hadid
Personal information
- Date of birth: 30 January 1987 (age 39)
- Place of birth: Oman
- Position: Striker

Team information
- Current team: Al-Seeb
- Number: 2

Senior career*
Years	Team	Apps	(Gls)
2007–2012	Al-Tali'aa	?	(12)
2012–2013	Saham	?	(2)
2013–	Al-Seeb		(2)

International career
2009–2010	Oman	11	(3)
- * Club domestic league appearances and goals

Osama Hadid Al-Mukhaini (Arabic: أُسَامَة حَدِيد ثُوَيْنِيّ الْمُخَيْنِيّ; born 30 January 1987),, is an Omani footballer who plays for Al-Seeb Club.

== Club career ==
On 23 June 2013, he signed a contract with Al-Seeb Club.

=== Club career statistics ===
Club	Season	Division	League		Cup		Continental		Other		Total	
Club	Season	Division	Apps	Goals	Apps	Goals	Apps	Goals	Apps	Goals	Apps	Goals
Al-Tali'aa	2007–08	Oman Elite League	-	5	-	0	0	0	-	0	-	5
Al-Tali'aa	2009–10	Oman Elite League	-	4	-	0	0	0	-	0	-	4
Al-Tali'aa	2010–11	Oman Elite League	-	2	-	1	0	0	-	0	-	3
Al-Tali'aa	2011–12	Oman Elite League	-	1	-	0	0	0	-	0	-	3
Al-Tali'aa	Total		-	12	-	1	0	0	-	0	-	13
Saham	2012–13	Oman Elite League	-	2	-	1	0	0	-	0	-	3
Saham	Total		-	2	-	1	0	0	-	0	-	3
Al-Seeb	2013–14	Oman Professional League	-	3	-	0	0	0	-	0	-	3
Al-Seeb	Total		-	3	-	0	0	0	-	0	-	3
Career total			-	17	-	2	0	0	-	0	-	19

== International career ==
Osama was selected for the national team for the first time in 2009. He made his first appearance for Oman on 20 January 2010 in a friendly match against Sweden. He has made appearances in the 20th Arabian Gulf Cup and has represented the national team in the 2011 AFC Asian Cup qualification.

== National team career statistics ==
=== Goals for Senior National Team ===
Scores and results list Oman's goal tally first.

#	Date	Venue	Opponent	Score	Result	Competition
1	31 December 2009	National Stadium, Singapore, Kallang, Singapore	Singapore	4–0	4–1	Friendly
2	21 September 2010	Amman International Stadium, Amman, Jordan	Iraq	2–3	2–3	Friendly
3	28 September 2010	King Abdullah Stadium, Amman, Jordan	Iran	1–1	2–2	2010 WAFF Championship

== Honours ==
Al-Seeb

- Oman Professional League Cup runner-up: 2013
