= Aziz Mashaan =

Kuwaiti footballer

Personal information
- Full name: Abdulaziz Ahmad Al Masha'an Al Enezi
- Date of birth: 19 October 1988 (age 38)
- Place of birth: Kuwait City, Kuwait
- Height: 1.67 m (5 ft 6 in)
- Position: Midfielder

Youth career
- 2002–2005: Qadsia

Senior career*
Years	Team	Apps	(Gls)
2005–2006	Qadsia	20	(8)
2006–2007	R.E. Mouscron	15	(3)
2007–2012	Qadsia	63	(14)
2012–2014	Příbram	31	(2)
2014–2019	Qadsia	37	(4)
2019–2020	Al-Nasr	4	(0)
2020	Al-Jahra	2	(0)
2020–2022	Al-Salmiya	7	(0)

International career^{‡}
2007–2009	Kuwait U23	6	(1)
2010–2015	Kuwait	45	(2)
- * Club domestic league appearances and goals as of 23 July 2014 ‡ National team caps and goals as of 17 January 2015

Abdulaziz Ahmad Al Masha'an Al Enezi (Arabic: عبدالعزيز أحمد المشعان العنزي, born 19 October 1988), better known as Aziz Mashaan is a Kuwaiti former footballer.

== Club career ==
Began playing with the club Qadsia at the age of six. Mashaan joined R.E. Mouscron in Belgium for a year, he faced financial problems with the club and went back to Qadsia.

Mashaan played in the Czech Republic since January 2013 in club Příbram where he signed for 2 years, became the first Kuwaiti to play professional football in Europe. He scored two goals during his league debut at home against Teplice on 2 March 2013. Příbram won the match 3–1.

In June 2013, Mashaan was selected as the fourth best foreign player in the Czech Premier League.

== International career ==
=== International goals ===
Scores and results list Kuwait's goal tally first.

Goal	Date	Venue	Opponent	Score	Result	Competition
1.	3 October 2010	King Abdullah II Stadium, Amman, Jordan	Iran	1–0	2–1	2010 WAFF Championship
2.	3 September 2015	Abdullah bin Khalifa Stadium, Doha, Qatar	Myanmar	6–0	9–0	2018 FIFA World Cup qualification
