= Ahmed Al-Mukhaini =

Omani footballer (born 1985)

Personal information
- Full name: Ahmed Saleem Thuwaini Al-Mukhaini
- Date of birth: 2 May 1985 (age 41)
- Place of birth: Abu Dhabi, United Arab Emirates
- Height: 1.89 m (6 ft 2 in)
- Position: Right-back

Team information
- Current team: Dhofar

Youth career
- Al-Oruba

Senior career*
Years	Team	Apps	(Gls)
2003–2006	Al-Oruba	?	
2006–2011	Muscat	?	(3)
2011–2015	Al-Oruba		(2)
2016	Dhofar		

International career
2014–	Oman	1	(0)
- * Club domestic league appearances and goals

Ahmed Saleem Thuwaini Al-Mukhaini (Arabic: أحمد سليم ثويني المخيني; born 2 May 1985), commonly known as Ahmed Al-Mukhaini, is an Omani footballer who plays for Al-Oruba in Oman Professional League.

== International career ==
Ahmed is part of the first team squad of the Oman national football team. He was selected for the national team for the first time in 2014. He made his first appearance for Oman on 31 December 2014 in a friendly match against Sweden.

=== Club career statistics ===
Club	Season	Division	League		Cup		Continental (Note: Includes appearances in the AFC Cup)		Other		Total	
Club	Season	Division	Apps	Goals	Apps	Goals	Apps	Goals	Apps	Goals	Apps	Goals
Muscat	2010–11	Omani League	-	3	-	1	0	0	-	0	-	4
Muscat	Total		-	3	-	1	0	0	-	0	-	4
Al-Oruba	2011–12	Oman Professional League	-	0	-	1	0	0	-	0	-	0
Al-Oruba	2013–14	Oman Professional League	-	2	-	0	0	0	-	0	-	2
Al-Oruba	Total		-	2	-	0	0	0	-	0	-	2
Career total			-	5	-	1	1	0	-	0	-	6

== Honours ==
=== Club ===
- With Al-Oruba

- Oman Professional League (1): 2014–15
- Sultan Qaboos Cup (1): 2014–15
