= Andranik Teymourian =

Iranian footballer (born 1983)

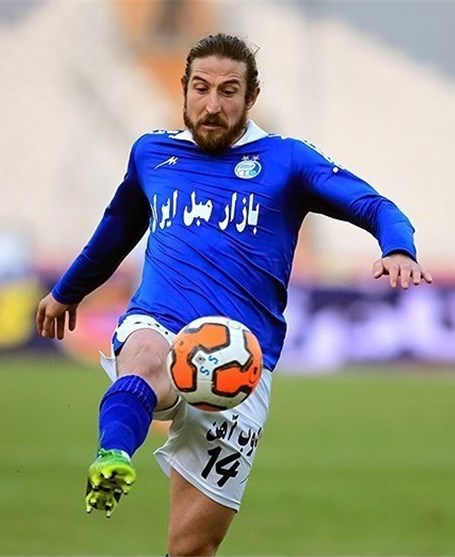
- Teymourian playing for Esteghlal in the AFC Champions League

Personal information
- Full name: Andranik Timotian-Samarani
- Date of birth: 6 March 1983 (age 43)
- Place of birth: Tehran, Iran
- Height: 1.80 m (5 ft 11 in)
- Position: Midfielder

Youth career
- 1998–2000: Ararat Tehran
- 2000–2002: Esteghlal

Senior career*
Years	Team	Apps	(Gls)
2002–2004	Oghab		
2004–2006	Aboumoslem	44	(3)
2006–2008	Bolton Wanderers	20	(2)
2008–2010	Fulham	10	(0)
2009	→ Barnsley (loan)	11	(0)
2010–2011	Tractor	21	(1)
2011–2012	Esteghlal	20	(1)
2012–2013	Al Kharaitiyat	20	(0)
2013–2015	Esteghlal	36	(13)
2015	Tractor	13	(3)
2015–2016	Umm Salal	14	(0)
2016	Saipa	4	(0)
2016–2017	Machine Sazi	11	(0)
2017	Naft Tehran	10	(0)
2017–2018	Gostaresh Foulad	20	(0)
Total		245	(23)

International career
2005	Iran B	6	(0)
2005–2016	Iran	101	(9)

Managerial career
- 2023–2026: Iran (assistant coach)
- * Club domestic league appearances and goals

Andranik "Ando" Timotian-Samarani, commonly known as Andranik Teymourian (Armenian: Անդրանիկ Թէյմուրեան; Persian: آندرانيک تیموریان, romanized: Ândrânik Teymuryân, born 6 March 1983) is a former Iranian professional footballer who played as a midfielder. He is notably the first Christian to captain the Iran national team.

From 2006 to the end of 2010, he played for three clubs in England, namely Bolton Wanderers and Fulham in the Premier League and Barnsley in the Football League Championship.

Teymourian played his first match for Iran in 2005 and has featured in their squads for the 2006 and 2014 World Cups, as well as also the 2007, 2011 and 2015 Asian Cups.

Teymourian is currently an assistant coach for Iran's national Football team and was part of the delegation sent to USA for World Cup 2026

== Club career ==
=== Early career ===
Andranik was born in Tehran, Iran to ethnic Armenian parents. He started with Oghab F.C. in Iran's Azadegan League, and continued his professional career playing for F.C. Aboomoslem in the Iranian Premier League. In the 2005–06 season, Andranik made 26 appearances for F.C. Aboomoslem and scored one goal.

=== Bolton Wanderers ===
In late August 2006 he signed a two-year deal with FA Premier League club Bolton Wanderers, for an undisclosed fee, after being granted a work permit. He scored his first two goals for Bolton Wanderers in the FA Cup third round in a 4–0 win over Doncaster Rovers on 6 January 2007, in only his third appearance. Andranik then went on to make his full Premier League debut against Fulham on 11 February 2007. His first two league goals came during a man-of-the-match performance against local rivals Wigan Athletic on 7 April 2007.

=== Fulham ===
On 12 June 2008, Andranik signed a two-year contract with Fulham after moving on a free transfer. He made his Fulham debut against Arsenal, in which he helped secure a 1–0 victory. On 2 February 2009, he went on loan to Barnsley of the Football League Championship until the end of the season. He later stated that he wanted to stay with Fulham for the 2009–10 season. On 1 July 2010, Fulham announced that Andranik had been released from his contract with Fulham.

In July 2010, Teymourian was named in Blackburn Rovers' team to face Southport FC in a pre-season friendly.

On 22 July 2010, Teymourian began talks with Sheffield United after turning down a tour with Blackburn Rovers across Australia. Blades coach Gary Speed was believed to have recommended Teymourian to Blades boss Kevin Blackwell as Speed and Teymourian played together at Bolton Wanderers. Teymourian began talks with Blackburn Rovers about a deal to stay with the Premier League club possibly on a short-term deal. The move broke down as he was denied a work permit.

=== Tractor ===
On 19 September 2010, Teymourian returned to Iran to join the Tabriz-based club Tractor, the move marked the end of his career in England.

=== Esteghlal ===
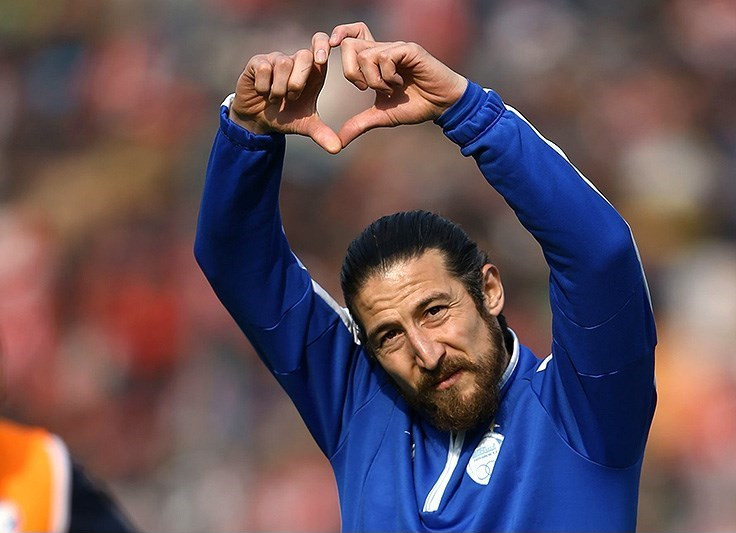
Teymourian playing for Esteghlal in Tehran derby

It was confirmed in mid-July 2011 that Teymourian had signed a contract with Tehran and IPL club Esteghlal. He made his debut for club against Sepahan. On 9 November 2011, he was named as one of the ten finalists for the Asian Player of the Year. He won the Hazfi Cup in his first season.

=== Al Kharaitiyat ===
Teymourian signed a one-year deal with Qatari side Al Kharaitiyat SC worth $1.8 million. After his contract ended on 1 July 2013, he left the club.

=== Return to Esteghlal ===
On 18 July 2013, Teymourian returned to Esteghlal after signing a three-year contract with the club. He made his debut in a 2–1 loss to Sepahan. He scored a 40-yard goal in a match against Buriram United which Esteghlal won 2–1. Teymourian suffered a broken arm and was out of play for a month. He returned to the fields at the league's two final matches which Esteghlal finished the season at fifth place and missed next years' Champions League.

On 2 August 2014, Teymourian was named the 2013–14 season's best player on the annual awards ceremony of the season.

=== Return to Tractor ===
On 27 December 2014, Teymourian joined Tractor again with an 18–month contract. He scored a free-kick on his debut in a match against Saba Qom.

=== Umm Salal ===
On 13 July 2015, Teymourian signed with Qatari side Umm Salal. He left the club halfway through the season in January 2016 after a disagreement with the head coach, Bülent Uygun, and with only 14 appearances.

=== Saipa ===
On 19 January 2016, Teymourian signed a six-month deal with Saipa, having previously been linked with Tehran-based club Esteghlal and Thailand's Buriram United. Injury caused him to only play four matches for the club before leaving in July 2016.

=== Machine Sazi ===
In July 2016 Teymourian returned to Tabriz and signed a one–year contract with newly promoted Persian Gulf Pro League club Machine Sazi.

== International career ==
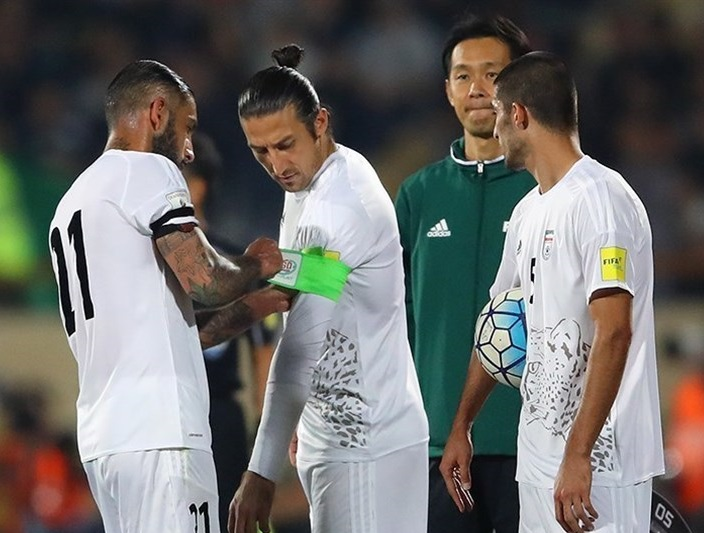
Teymourian became the first Christian captain of the Iranian national team in 2015.

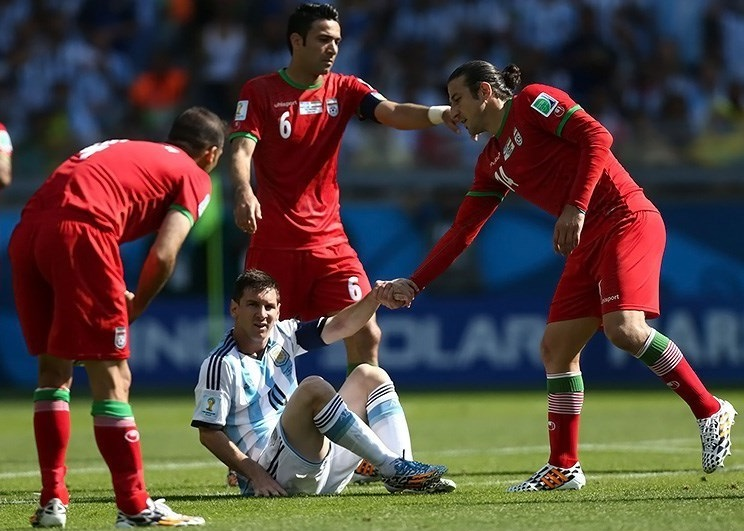
Teymourian playing for Iran against Lionel Messi and Argentina in 2014 World Cup

Teymourian played for Iran national teams at the youth level, before being selected to take part with the senior side. He was a member of the national team during the 2006 World Cup. Pictures of an emotionally and physically drained Teymourian at the end of Iran's last game of the 2006 World Cup have begun to take the shape of Iranian football's most notable photograph from the event. Teymourian dropped to the grass and began sobbing while trainers attended to him. He has started to be recognized as a national hero in Iran because of the passion he showed for his country in the 2006 World Cup. He played in the 2007 and 2011 Asian Cups, as well as the WAFF Championships. The midfielder cemented his spot as a starter next to Javad Nekounam, leading Iran to qualify for the 2014 World Cup.

On 18 May 2014, Teymourian captained Iran in the match against Belarus, making him the first Christian to captain the Iranian national team. On 1 June 2014, he was called into Iran's 2014 FIFA World Cup squad by Carlos Queiroz. He played the full 90 minutes in all three group stage matches, becoming the most capped Iran player at the World Cup with six matches alongside Mehdi Mahdavikia. He was called into Iran's 2015 AFC Asian Cup squad on 30 December 2014 by Carlos Queiroz. He provided three assists in the tournament.

Prior to the start of qualification for the 2018 FIFA World Cup, Teymourian was appointed as the new captain for Iran after Javad Nekounam's retirement.

Teymourian won his 100th cap for the national team in a 1–0 win over Uzbekistan.

== Personal life ==
Andranik's elder brother Serjik Teymourian, was also a football player and played in Germany for 1. FSV Mainz 05 as a defensive midfielder. He died at the age of 46 in 2020, from a traffic collision.

== Career statistics ==
=== Club ===
Appearances and goals by club, season and competition
Club	Season	League			National Cup		League Cup		Continental		Total	
Club	Season	Division	Apps	Goals	Apps	Goals	Apps	Goals	Apps	Goals	Apps	Goals
Aboomoslem	2004–05	Pro League	18	2	5	0	–		–		23	2
Aboomoslem	2005–06	Pro League	26	1	0	0	–		–		26	1
Aboomoslem	Total		44	3	5	0	0	0	0	0	49	3
Bolton	2006–07	Premier League	17	2	2	2	2	0	–		21	4
Bolton	2007–08	Premier League	3	0	0	0	0	0	5	0	8	0
Bolton	Total		20	2	2	2	2	0	5	0	29	4
Fulham	2008–09	Premier League	1	0	0	0	1	0	0	0	2	0
Fulham	2009–10	Premier League	0	0	0	0	0	0	0	0	0	0
Fulham	Total		1	0	0	0	1	0	0	0	2	0
Barnsley (loan)	2008–09	Championship	11	0	0	0	0	0	–		11	0
Tractor	2010–11	Pro League	21	1	1	0	–		–		22	1
Esteghlal	2011–12	Pro League	20	1	2	0	–		3	0	25	1
Al Kharaitiyat	2012–13	Qatar Stars League	20	0	1	1	–		–		21	1
Esteghlal	2013–14	Pro League	22	1	4	0	–		5	1	31	2
Esteghlal	2014–15	Pro League	14	0	3	0	–		0	0	17	0
Esteghlal	Total		36	1	7	0	0	0	5	1	48	2
Tractor	2014–15	Pro League	13	3	0	0	–		0	0	13	3
Umm Salal	2015–16	Qatar Stars League	14	0	0	0	–		–		14	0
Saipa	2016	Pro League	4	0	0	0	–		–		4	0
Mashine Sazi	2016–17	Pro League	11	0	0	0	–		–		11	0
Naft Tehran	2016–17	Pro League	10	0	0	0	–		–		10	0
Gostaresh Foulad	2017–18	Pro League	20	0	0	0	–		–		20	0
Career total			245	11	18	3	3	0	13	1	266	15

=== International ===
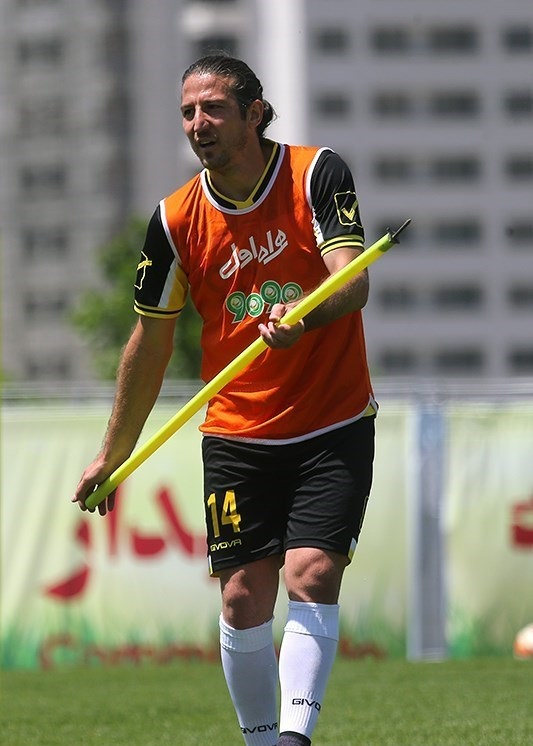
Andranik Teymourian in Iran national football team training in 2016

Appearances and goals by national team and year
National team	Year	Apps	Goals
Iran	2005	3	0
Iran	2006	14	1
Iran	2007	6	1
Iran	2008	8	0
Iran	2009	11	2
Iran	2010	11	2
Iran	2011	11	2
Iran	2012	5	0
Iran	2013	7	0
Iran	2014	7	0
Iran	2015	14	1
Iran	2016	4	0
Total		101	9

Scores and results list Iran's goal tally first, score column indicates score after each Teymourian goal.

List of international goals scored by Andranik Teymourian
No.	Date	Venue	Opponent	Score	Result	Competition
1	22 February 2006	Azadi Stadium, Tehran, Iran	Chinese Taipei	1–0	4–0	2007 AFC Asian Cup qualification
2	18 July 2007	Bukit Jalil Stadium, Kuala Lumpur, Malaysia	Malaysia	2–0	2–0	2007 AFC Asian Cup
3	12 August 2009	Asim Ferhatovic, Sarajevo, Bosnia and Herzegovina	Bosnia and Herzegovina	3–2	3–2	Friendly
4	18 November 2009	Azadi Stadium, Tehran, Iran	Macedonia	1–0	1–1	Friendly
5	3 September 2010	Zhengzhou Hanghai Stadium, Zhengzhou, China	China	1–0	2–0	Friendly
6	28 September 2010	Amman International Stadium, Amman, Jordan	Oman	2–2	2–2	2010 West Asian Football Federation Championship
7	2 September 2011	Azadi Stadium, Tehran, Iran	Indonesia	3–0	3–0	2014 World Cup qualification
8	11 October 2011	Azadi Stadium, Tehran, Iran	Bahrain	4–0	6–0	2014 World Cup qualification
9	8 September 2015	Sree Kanteerawa Stadium, Bangalore, India	India	2–0	3–0	2018 World Cup qualification and 2019 AFC Asian Cup qualification

== Honours ==
Esteghlal

- Hazfi Cup: 2011–12

Naft Tehran

- Hazfi Cup: 2016–17

Individual

- Persian Gulf Pro League Best Player of the Year: 2013–14
- Persian Gulf Pro League Best Midfield of the Year: 2014–15
- Persian Gulf Pro League Team of the Year: 2013–14, 2014–15

== See also ==
- List of men's footballers with 100 or more international caps

Sporting positions
Preceded by Javad Nekounam	Iran national football team captain 2015–2016	Succeeded by Masoud Shojaei
