= Bahrain national football team results =

This article includes the Bahrain national football team results since its beginnings.

== 2010s ==
=== 2019 ===
5 January 2019 2019 Asian Cup	United Arab Emirates	1–1	Bahrain	Abu Dhabi, United Arab Emirates
20:00 UTC+4	Khalil 88' (pen.)	Report	Al Romaihi 78'	Stadium: Zayed Sports City Stadium; Attendance: 33,878; Referee: Adham Makhadmeh (Jordan)

10 January 2019 2019 Asian Cup	Bahrain	0–1	Thailand	Dubai, United Arab Emirates
15:00 UTC+4		Report	Chanathip 58'	Stadium: Al-Maktoum Stadium; Attendance: 2,720; Referee: Chris Beath (Australia)

14 January 2019 2019 Asian Cup	India	0–1	Bahrain	Sharjah, United Arab Emirates
20:00 UTC+4		Report	Rashid 90+1' (pen.)	Stadium: Sharjah Stadium; Attendance: 11,417; Referee: Ilgiz Tantashev (Uzbekistan)

22 January 2019 2019 Asian Cup	South Korea	2–1 (a.e.t.)	Bahrain	Dubai, United Arab Emirates
17:00 UTC+4	Hwang Hee-chan 43'; Kim Jin-su 105+2'	Report	Al Romaihi 77'	Stadium: Rashid Stadium; Attendance: 7,658; Referee: Ryuji Sato (Japan)

4 August 2019 2019 WAFF	Jordan	0–1	Bahrain	Erbil, Iraq
19:30 (UTC+3)		Report	Abdullatif 69'	Stadium: Franso Hariri Stadium; Attendance: 3,500; Referee: Haitham Al-Walidi (Yemen)

7 August 2019 2019 WAFF	Bahrain	0–0	Saudi Arabia	Erbil, Iraq
19:30 (UTC+3)		Report		Stadium: Franso Hariri Stadium; Referee: Wissam Rabie (Syria)

10 August 2019 2019 WAFF	Kuwait	0–1	Bahrain	Erbil, Iraq
22:30 (UTC+3)		Report	Abdullatif 80'	Stadium: Franso Hariri Stadium; Referee: Wathik Al-Baag (Iraq)

14 August 2019 2019 WAFF	Iraq	0–1	Bahrain	Karbala, Iraq
20:30 (UTC+3)		Report	Moosa 40'	Stadium: Karbala International Stadium; Attendance: 34,500; Referee: Turki Al-Khudhayr (Saudi Arabia)

5 September 2019 2022 FWCQ	Bahrain	1–1	Iraq	Riffa, Bahrain
19:30 (UTC+3)	Al Aswad 9'	Report (FIFA); Report (AFC)	M. Ali 86'	Stadium: Bahrain National Stadium; Referee: Omar Al-Yaqoubi (Oman)

10 September 2019 2022 FWCQ	Cambodia	0–1	Bahrain	Phnom Penh, Cambodia
18:30 UTC+7		Report (FIFA); Report (AFC)	Al Aswad 78'	Stadium: Phnom Penh Olympic Stadium; Referee: Nivon Robesh Gamini (Sri Lanka)

9 October 2019 Friendly	Bahrain	2–3	Azerbaijan	Riffa, Bahrain
19:30 (AST)	Al-Malood 32'; Al-Shaikh 68'	Report	Dadashov 41'; Khalilzade 62'; Sheydayev 70'	Stadium: Bahrain National Stadium

15 October 2019 2022 FWCQ	Bahrain	1–0	Iran	Riffa, Bahrain
19:30 UTC+3	Al-Hardan 65' (pen.)	Report (FIFA); Report (AFC)		Stadium: Bahrain National Stadium; Attendance: 14,810; Referee: Valentin Kovalenko (Uzbekistan)

14 November 2019 2022 FWCQ	Hong Kong	0–0	Bahrain	Kowloon, Hong Kong
20:00 UTC+8		Report (FIFA); Report (AFC)		Stadium: Mong Kok Stadium; Attendance: 4,541; Referee: Kim Dong-jin (South Korea)

19 November 2019 2022 FWCQ	Iraq	0–0	Bahrain	Amman, Jordan
16:00 UTC+2		Report (FIFA); Report (AFC)		Stadium: Amman International Stadium; Attendance: 10,366; Referee: Muhammad Taqi (Singapore)

27 November 2019 2019 Gulf Cup	Oman	0–0	Bahrain	Doha, Qatar
17:30 UTC+3		Report		Stadium: Abdullah bin Khalifa Stadium; Referee: Alexandre Boucaut (Belgium)

30 November 2019 2019 Gulf Cup	Bahrain	0–2	Saudi Arabia	Doha, Qatar
20:00 UTC+3		Report	Al-Hamdan 29'; Al-Khabrani 58'	Stadium: Abdullah bin Khalifa Stadium; Referee: Lionel Tschudi (Switzerland)

2 December 2019 2019 Gulf Cup	Kuwait	2–4	Bahrain	Doha, Qatar
20:00 UTC+3	Nasser 59' (pen.); Zanki 85'	Report	Madan 45+1'; Al-Shaikh 69'; Thiago Augusto 83', 90+3'	Stadium: Khalifa International Stadium; Referee: Ammar Al-Jeneibi (United Arab Emirates)

5 December 2019 2019 Gulf Cup	Iraq	2–2 (a.e.t.) (3–5 p)	Bahrain	Doha, Qatar
17:00 UTC+3	Ali 6'; Bayesh 18'	Report	Al-Haza'a 14'; Marhoon 45+2'	Stadium: Abdullah bin Khalifa Stadium; Referee: Ryuji Sato (Japan)
	Penalties
	Faez (penalty scored); Ismail (penalty scored); Bayesh (penalty scored); Qasim (penalty missed)		(penalty scored) Al-Hardan; (penalty scored) Al-Shaikh; (penalty scored) Marhoon; (penalty scored) Thiago Augusto; (penalty scored) Madan

8 December 2019 2019 Gulf Cup	Bahrain	1–0	Saudi Arabia	Doha, Qatar
19:00 UTC+3	Al Romaihi 69'	Report		Stadium: Abdullah bin Khalifa Stadium; Referee: Lionel Tschudi (Switzerland)

=== 2018 ===
2 January 2018 2017 Gulf Cup	Oman	1–0	Bahrain	Kuwait City, Kuwait
17:15 UTC+3	Abduljabbar 29' (o.g.)	Report		Stadium: Jaber International Stadium; Referee: Hettikamkanamge Perera (Sri Lanka)

22 March 2018 Friendly	Bahrain	0–0	Palestine	Riffa, Bahrain
18:00 UTC+3		Report		Stadium: Bahrain National Stadium; Referee: Ali Shaban (Kuwait)

27 March 2018 2019 AFC Asian Cup qualification	Bahrain	4–0	Turkmenistan	Riffa, Bahrain
19:00 UTC+3	Helal 12', 24'; Issa 64'; Yaser 67'	Report		Stadium: Bahrain National Stadium; Attendance: 100; Referee: Yaqoob Abdul Baki (Oman)

6 September 2018 Friendly	Bahrain	1–1	Philippines	Riffa, Bahrain
19:00 UTC+3	Issa 90+7'	Report	P. Younghusband 49' (pen.)	Stadium: Bahrain National Stadium; Referee: Hamad Ali Yousef (United Arab Emirates)

10 September 2018 Friendly	Bahrain	0–0	China	Riffa, Bahrain
19:00 UTC+3		Report		Stadium: Bahrain National Stadium; Referee: Ahmed Al Ali (Jordan)

11 October 2018 Friendly	Bahrain	0–1	Syria	Riffa, Bahrain
19:15 UTC+3		Report	Al Somah 30'	Stadium: Bahrain National Stadium; Referee: Mohammad Arafah (Jordan)

16 October 2018 Friendly	Bahrain	4–1	Myanmar	Riffa, Bahrain
22:45 (UTC+6:30)	Rashid 45+1' (pen.); Marhoon 48', 69'; Issa 70'	Report	Myat Kaung Khant 52'	Stadium: Bahrain National Stadium; Referee: Khalid Al-Turais (Saudi Arabia)

15 November 2018 Friendly	Kuwait	Cancelled	Bahrain	Kuwait City, Kuwait
18:00 (AST)		Report		Stadium: Jaber International Stadium; Referee: Sultan Abdulrazaq Al Marzouqi (United Arab Emirates)
Note: The match was cancelled due to bad weather conditions.

19 November 2018 Friendly	Oman	2–1	Bahrain	Muscat, Oman
17:30 (UTC+4)	E. Al-Farsi 56'; Al-Yahmadi 90'	Report	Al-Humaidan 68'	Stadium: Sultan Qaboos Sports Complex; Referee: Hussein Abo Yehia (Lebanon)

20 December 2018 Friendly	Bahrain	5–0	Tajikistan	Isa Town, Bahrain
14:00 (UTC+3)	Al Romaihi 29'; Rashid 43' (pen.), 75'; Madan 61'; Al-Husaini 85'	Report		Stadium: Khalifa Sports City Stadium; Attendance: 20; Referee: Ammar Ashkanani (Kuwait)

27 December 2018 Friendly	Bahrain	1–0	Lebanon	Riffa, Bahrain
20:00 (UTC+3)	Habib (pen.)	Report		Stadium: Bahrain National Stadium

29 December 2018 Friendly	Bahrain	4–0	North Korea	Isa Town, Bahrain
20:00 (UTC+3)		Report		Stadium: Khalifa Sports City Stadium; Referee: Omar Al Yaqoubi (Oman)

=== 2017 ===
23 March 2017 Friendly	Bahrain	1–1	Tajikistan	Riffa, Bahrain
	Al Aswad 90'		Dzhalilov 4'	Stadium: Bahrain National Stadium

28 March 2017 2019 Asian Cup qualification	Bahrain	0–0	Singapore	Riffa, Bahrain
19:00 UTC+3		Report		Stadium: Bahrain National Stadium; Attendance: 225; Referee: Nivon Robesh Gamini (Sri Lanka)

6 June 2017 Friendly	Bahrain	0–2	Palestine	Riffa, Bahrain
22:00 UTC+3		Report	Salem 58'; Maraaba 83'	Stadium: Bahrain National Stadium

13 June 2017 2019 Asian Cup qualification	Turkmenistan	1–2	Bahrain	Daşoguz, Turkmenistan
18:00 UTC+5	Ýagşyýew 86'	Report	Al Romaihi 55'; Yaser 80'	Stadium: Sport Toplumy Stadium; Attendance: 9,500; Referee: Ma Ning (China PR)

29 August 2017 Friendly	Bahrain	0–0	Jordan	Riffa, Bahrain
19:00 UTC+3		Report		Stadium: Bahrain National Stadium

5 September 2017 2019 Asian Cup qualification	Bahrain	5–0	Chinese Taipei	Riffa, Bahrain
19:00 UTC+3	Al-Aswad 11'; Madan 45+4'; Abduljabbar 56', 89'; Helal 74'	Report		Stadium: Bahrain National Stadium; Attendance: 362; Referee: Nagor Amir Noor Mohamed (Malaysia)

10 October 2017 2019 Asian Cup qualification	Chinese Taipei	2–1	Bahrain	Taipei, Taiwan
18:00 UTC+8	Chen Po-liang 90'; Chu En-le 90+2'	Report	Abdullatif 17' (pen.)	Stadium: Taipei Municipal Stadium; Attendance: 7,908; Referee: Hiroyuki Kimura (Japan)

9 November 2017 Friendly	Hong Kong	0–2	Bahrain	Mong Kok, Hong Kong
14:00 UTC+8		Report		Stadium: Mong Kok Stadium

14 November 2017 2019 Asian Cup qualification	Singapore	0–3	Bahrain	Singapore
19:30 UTC+8		Report	Abduljabbar 65', 84'; Rashid 81'	Stadium: National Stadium; Attendance: 2,628; Referee: Jarred Gillett (Australia)

18 December 2017 Friendly	Bahrain	0–0	Kuwait	Riffa, Bahrain
17:00 UTC+3		Report		Stadium: Bahrain National Stadium

23 December 2017 2017 Gulf Cup	Bahrain	1–1	Iraq	Kuwait City, Kuwait
20:00 UTC+3	Rashid 79'		Abdul-Raheem 89'	Stadium: Al Kuwait Sports Club Stadium; Referee: Ammar Al-Jeneibi (United Arab Emirates)

26 December 2017 2017 Gulf Cup	Yemen	0–1	Bahrain	Kuwait City, Kuwait
17:30 UTC+3			Rashid 39' (pen.)	Stadium: Al Kuwait Sports Club Stadium; Referee: Sultan Al-Harbi (Saudi Arabia)

29 December 2017 2017 Gulf Cup	Qatar	1–1	Bahrain	Kuwait City, Kuwait
18:30 UTC+3	Al-Haydos 45+5' (pen.)		Madan 57'	Stadium: Jaber International Stadium; Referee: Aziz Asimov (Uzbekistan)

=== 2016 ===
5 February 2016 Friendly	Bahrain	2–0	Lebanon

24 March 2016 2018 FWCQ	Bahrain	3–0	Yemen	Riffa, Bahrain
	Abdulatif 32' (pen.); Al-Malood 63'; Al Romaihi 90+2'			Stadium: Bahrain National Stadium; Attendance: 1,000; Referee: Ahmed Al-Kaf (Oman)

29 March 2016 2018 FWCQ	Uzbekistan	1–0	Bahrain	Tashkent, Uzbekistan
	Rashidov 50'			Stadium: Bunyodkor Stadium; Attendance: 34,000; Referee: Mohammed Abdulla Hassan Mohamed (United Arab Emirates)

1 September 2016 Friendly	Bahrain	3–1	Singapore

4 September 2016 Friendly	Bahrain	0–0	Jordan

7 October 2016 Friendly	Philippines	1–3	Bahrain

11 October 2016 Friendly	Oman	2–2	Bahrain

9 November 2016 Friendly	United Arab Emirates	2–0	Bahrain

15 November 2016 Friendly	Bahrain	0–0	Kyrgyzstan

=== 2015 ===
11 January 2015 2015 Asian Cup	Iran	2–0	Bahrain

15 January 2015 2015 Asian Cup	Bahrain	1–2	United Arab Emirates

19 January 2015 2015 Asian Cup	Qatar	1–2	Bahrain

26 March 2015 Friendly	Bahrain	0–6	Colombia

30 March 2015 Friendly	Bahrain	2–1	Philippines

5 June 2015 Friendly	Thailand	1–1	Bahrain

11 June 2015 2018 FWCQ	Philippines	2–1	Bahrain	Philippines

3 September 2015 2018 FWCQ	Bahrain	0–1	North Korea	Bahrain

8 September 2015 2018 FWCQ	Yemen	0–4	Bahrain

8 October 2015 2018 FWCQ	Bahrain	0–4	Uzbekistan	Bahrain

13 October 2015 2018 FWCQ	Bahrain	2–0	Philippines	Bahrain

17 November 2015 2018 FWCQ	North Korea	2–0	Bahrain	North Korea

=== 2014 ===
4 January 2014 2014 WAFF	Bahrain	0–1	Jordan

7 January 2014 2014 WAFF	Kuwait	0–0 (a.e.t.)	Bahrain

5 March 2014 2015 AFC Asian Cup qualification	Qatar	0–0	Bahrain	Qatar

9 September 2014 Friendly	Kuwait	0–1	Bahrain

10 October 2014 Friendly	Bahrain	0–0	Uzbekistan

14 October 2014 Friendly	Bahrain	0–0	Iraq

13 November 2014 2014 Gulf Cup	Yemen	0–0	Bahrain	Saudi Arabia

16 November 2014 2014 Gulf Cup	Saudi Arabia	3–0	Bahrain	Saudi Arabia

19 November 2014 2014 Gulf Cup	Bahrain	0–0	Qatar	Saudi Arabia

30 December 2014 Friendly	Bahrain	4–1	Saudi Arabia

=== 2013 ===
5 January 2013 2013 Gulf Cup	Bahrain	0–0	Oman	Bahrain

8 January 2013 2013 Gulf Cup	Bahrain	1–2	United Arab Emirates	Bahrain

11 January 2013 2013 Gulf Cup	Bahrain	1–0	Qatar	Bahrain

15 January 2013 2013 Gulf Cup	Iraq	2–1	Bahrain	Bahrain

18 January 2013 2013 Gulf Cup	Bahrain	1–6	Kuwait	Bahrain

1 February 2013 Friendly	Bahrain	3–1	Singapore

6 February 2013 2015 AFC Asian Cup qualification	Yemen	0–2	Bahrain	Sharjah, United Arab Emirates

17 March 2013 Friendly	Bahrain	0–0	Lebanon

22 March 2013 2015 AFC Asian Cup qualification	Bahrain	1–0	Qatar	Bahrain

7 June 2013 Friendly	Bahrain	1–3	Kyrgyzstan

10 October 2013 Friendly	Thailand	1–0	Bahrain

15 October 2013 2015 AFC Asian Cup qualification	Malaysia	1–1	Bahrain

9 November 2013 Friendly	Bahrain	1–0	Lebanon

15 November 2013 2015 AFC Asian Cup qualification	Bahrain	1–0	Malaysia

19 November 2013 2015 AFC Asian Cup qualification	Bahrain	2–0	Yemen

25 December 2013 2014 WAFF	Oman	0–0	Bahrain	Qatar

28 December 2013 2014 WAFF	Bahrain	0–0	Iraq	Qatar

=== 2012 ===
18 January 2012 Friendly	Bahrain	0–2	Sweden	Doha, Qatar
				Stadium: Thani bin Jassim Stadium

29 February 2012 2014 FWCQ	Bahrain	10–0	Indonesia	Bahrain

8 June 2012 Friendly	Kuwait	1–1	Bahrain

12 June 2012 Friendly	Kuwait	1–0	Bahrain

23 June 2012 2012 Arab Nations Cup	Morocco	4–0	Bahrain	Saudi Arabia

26 June 2012 2012 Arab Nations Cup	Bahrain	0–2	Yemen	Saudi Arabia

29 June 2012 2012 Arab Nations Cup	Libya	2–1	Bahrain	Saudi Arabia

15 August 2012 Friendly	Azerbaijan	3–0	Bahrain

12 October 2012 Friendly	Bahrain	0–0	Philippines

16 October 2012 Friendly	Bahrain	2–6	United Arab Emirates

8 November 2012 Friendly	Bahrain	3–0	Jordan

14 November 2012 Friendly	Kuwait	1–1	Bahrain

29 November 2012 Friendly	Palestine	0–2	Bahrain

3 December 2012 Friendly	Bahrain	0–0	Iraq

9 December 2012 2012 WAFF	Bahrain	1–0	Yemen

12 December 2012 2012 WAFF	Iran	0–0	Bahrain

15 December 2012 2012 WAFF	Bahrain	1–0	Saudi Arabia

18 December 2012 2012 WAFF	Bahrain	1–2 (a.e.t.)	Syria

20 December 2012 2012 WAFF	Oman	1–0	Bahrain

29 December 2012 Friendly	Bahrain	3–0	Guinea

=== 2011 ===
4 January 2011 Friendly	Bahrain	0–1	North Korea	Riffa, Bahrain
			An Chol-hyok 59'	Stadium: Bahrain National Stadium

10 January 2011 2011 Asian Cup	South Korea	2–1	Bahrain	Doha, Qatar
19:15 UTC+3	Koo Ja-Cheol 40', 52'		Aaish 85' (pen.)	Stadium: Thani bin Jassim Stadium; Attendance: 6,669; Referee: Abdullah Al Hilali (Oman)

14 January 2011 2011 Asian Cup	Bahrain	5–2	India	Doha, Qatar
19:15 UTC+3	Aaish 8' (pen.); Abdullatif 16', 19', 35', 77'		G. Singh 9'; Chhetri 52'	Stadium: Jassim bin Hamad Stadium; Attendance: 11,032; Referee: Subkhiddin Mohd Salleh (Malaysia)

18 January 2011 2011 Asian Cup	Australia	1–0	Bahrain	Doha, Qatar
16:15 UTC+3	Jedinak 37'			Stadium: Jassim bin Hamad Stadium; Attendance: 3,919; Referee: Yuichi Nishimura (Japan)

14 February 2011 Friendly	Bahrain	0–0	Kuwait

10 August 2011 Friendly	Oman	1–1	Bahrain
	Hadid 18'		Abdulrahman 34'

26 August 2011 Friendly	Bahrain	1–0	Sudan	Riffa, Bahrain
	Abdullatif 25'			Stadium: Bahrain National Stadium

2 September 2011 2014 FWCQ	Bahrain	0–0	Qatar	Bahrain

6 September 2011 2014 FWCQ	Indonesia	0–2	Bahrain	Jakarta, Indonesia

11 October 2011 2014 FWCQ	Iran	6–0	Bahrain	Tehran, Iran

4 November 2011 Friendly	Kuwait	0–1	Bahrain	Al Farwaniyah, Kuwait
17:30 UTC+3			Abdulrahman 45'	Stadium: Ali Sabah Al-Salem Stadium

11 November 2011 2014 FWCQ	Bahrain	1–1	Iran	Bahrain

15 November 2011 2014 FWCQ	Qatar	0–0	Bahrain	Qatar

6 December 2011 Friendly	Bahrain	0–1	Palestine	Arad, Bahrain
19:00 UTC+3			El-Khatib 69'	Stadium: Al Muharraq Stadium

13 December 2011 Football at the 2011 Pan Arab Games	Bahrain	3–0	Iraq	Doha, Qatar
17:30 UTC+3	Al Hardan 41'; Abdullatif 63' (pen.), 70'			Stadium: Jassim bin Hamad Stadium; Referee: Khaled Abdurahaman (Sudan)

20 December 2011 Football at the 2011 Pan Arab Games	Bahrain	3–1	Palestine	Al Rayyan, Qatar
17:30 UTC+3	Al Alawi 6'; Isa 44'; Abu Saleh 58' (o.g.)		Nu'man 40' (pen.)	Stadium: Thani bin Jassim Stadium; Referee: Andre El Haddad (Lebanon)

23 December 2011 Football at the 2011 Pan Arab Games	Bahrain	1–0	Jordan	Doha, Qatar
17:30 UTC+3	Abdullatif 89'			Stadium: Jassim bin Hamad Stadium; Referee: Abdullah Balideh (Qatar)

=== 2010 ===
6 January 2010 2011 AFC Asian Cup qualification	Bahrain	4–0	Hong Kong	Riffa, Bahrain
18:00 UTC+3	Abdullatif 35', 40', 44'; Adnan 79'			Stadium: Bahrain National Stadium; Attendance: 1,550; Referee: Abdullah Balideh (Qatar)

20 January 2010 2011 AFC Asian Cup qualification	Yemen	3–0	Bahrain	Sana'a, Yemen
16:15 UTC+3	Al-Nono 5', 25'; Al Abidi 86'			Stadium: Ali Mohsen Al-Muraisi Stadium; Attendance: 7,000; Referee: Mohsen Torky (Iran)

25 February 2010 Friendly	Kuwait	4–1	Bahrain

3 March 2010 2011 AFC Asian Cup qualification	Japan	2–0	Bahrain	Toyota, Japan
19:00 UTC+9	Okazaki 36'; Honda 90+2'			Stadium: Toyota Stadium; Attendance: 38,042; Referee: Abdul Malik Abdul Bashir (Singapore)

11 August 2010 Friendly	China	1–1	Bahrain

3 September 2010 Friendly	Qatar	1–1	Bahrain

7 September 2010 Friendly	Bahrain	3–0 (Note: The match was proven as corrupted by the FIFA Ethics Committee when they investigated the match's referee Ibrahim Chaibou, who was banned for life by FIFA in January 2019 for match fixing. Chaibou's ties to Singaporean match fixer Wilson Raj Perumal were extensive in manipulating matches for Perumal's private business. The team supposedly representing Togo was not an official team from the Togolese Football Federation.)	Togo
				Referee: Ibrahim Chaibou (Niger)

19 September 2010 Friendly	Jordan	2–0	Bahrain

8 October 2010 Friendly	Kuwait	1–3	Bahrain

12 October 2010 Friendly	Bahrain	2–4	Uzbekistan

10 November 2010 Friendly	Bahrain	0–0	Uganda

14 November 2010 Friendly	Bahrain	0–2	Syria

23 November 2010 2010 Gulf Cup	Oman	1–1	Bahrain	Yemen

26 November 2010 2010 Gulf Cup	Bahrain	2–3	Iraq	Yemen

29 November 2010 2010 Gulf Cup	United Arab Emirates	3–1	Bahrain	Yemen

28 December 2010 Friendly	Bahrain	2–1	Jordan	Dubai, United Arab Emirates

31 December 2010 Friendly	Bahrain	0–1	Saudi Arabia

== 2000s ==
=== 2009 ===
4 January 2009 2009 Gulf Cup	Bahrain	3–1	Iraq	Muscat, Oman
				Stadium: Sultan Qaboos Sports Complex

7 January 2009 2009 Gulf Cup	Bahrain	0–1	Kuwait	Muscat, Oman
				Stadium: Sultan Qaboos Sports Complex

10 January 2009 2009 Gulf Cup	Oman	2–0	Bahrain	Muscat, Oman
				Stadium: Sultan Qaboos Sports Complex

21 January 2009 2011 Asian Cup qualification	Hong Kong	1–3	Bahrain	Hong Kong

28 January 2009 2011 Asian Cup qualification	Bahrain	1–0	Japan	Bahrain

4 February 2009 Friendly	Bahrain	2–2	South Korea	Dubai, United Arab Emirates

11 February 2009 2010 FWCQ	Uzbekistan	0–1	Bahrain	Tashkent, Uzbekistan
				Stadium: Pakhtakor Markaziy Stadium; Attendance: 30,000; Referee: Subkhiddin Mohd Salleh (Malaysia)

23 March 2009 Friendly	Bahrain	5–2	Zanzibar

28 March 2009 2010 FWCQ	Japan	1–0	Bahrain	Saitama, Japan
				Stadium: Saitama Stadium 2002; Attendance: 57,276; Referee: Kim Dong-jin (South Korea)

1 April 2009 2010 FWCQ	Bahrain	1–0	Qatar	Riffa, Bahrain
				Stadium: Bahrain National Stadium; Attendance: 20,000; Referee: Sun Baojie (China)

3 June 2009 Friendly	Bahrain	4–0	Jordan	Riffa, Bahrain

10 June 2009 2010 FWCQ	Australia	2–0	Bahrain	Sydney
				Stadium: Stadium Australia; Attendance: 39,540; Referee: Abdullah Al Hilali (Oman)

17 June 2009 2010 FWCQ	Bahrain	1–0	Uzbekistan	Riffa, Bahrain
				Stadium: Bahrain National Stadium; Attendance: 14,100; Referee: Masoud Moradi (Iran)

26 August 2009 Friendly	Bahrain	2–1	Kenya	Riffa, Bahrain

31 August 2009 Friendly	Bahrain	4–2	Iran	Riffa, Bahrain

5 September 2009 2010 FWCQ	Bahrain	0–0	Saudi Arabia	Riffa, Bahrain
				Stadium: Bahrain National Stadium; Attendance: 16,000; Referee: Yuichi Nishimura (Japan)

9 September 2009 2010 FWCQ	Saudi Arabia	2–2	Bahrain	Riyadh, Saudi Arabia
				Stadium: King Fahd International Stadium; Attendance: 50,000; Referee: Ravshan Irmatov (Uzbekistan)

10 October 2009 2010 FWCQ	Bahrain	0–0	New Zealand	Riffa, Bahrain
				Stadium: Bahrain National Stadium; Attendance: 37,000; Referee: Viktor Kassai (Hungary)

6 November 2009 Friendly	Bahrain	5–1	Togo	Riffa, Bahrain
				Stadium: Bahrain National Stadium

14 November 2009 2010 FWCQ	New Zealand	1–0	Bahrain	Wellington, New Zealand
	Fallon 45'			Stadium: Westpac Stadium; Attendance: 36,500; Referee: Jorge Larrionda (Uruguay)

18 November 2009 2011 Asian Cup qualification	Bahrain	4–0	Yemen	Bahrain

=== 2008 ===
16 January 2008 Friendly	Bahrain	1–0	Kuwait

23 January 2008 Friendly	Bahrain	1–2	Syria

26 January 2008 Friendly	Bahrain	2–1	Yemen

30 January 2008 Friendly	Bahrain	1–0	Denmark

6 February 2008 2010 FWCQ	Oman	0–1	Bahrain	Oman

4 March 2008 Friendly	Qatar	1–2	Bahrain

21 March 2008 Friendly	Bahrain	1–0	Iran

26 March 2008 2010 FWCQ	Bahrain	1–0	Japan	Bahrain

28 May 2008 Friendly	Singapore	0–1	Bahrain

2 June 2008 2010 FWCQ	Thailand	2–3	Bahrain	Thailand

7 June 2008 2010 FWCQ	Bahrain	1–1	Thailand	Bahrain

14 June 2008 2010 FWCQ	Bahrain	1–1	Oman	Bahrain

22 June 2008 2010 FWCQ	Japan	1–0	Bahrain	Japan

20 August 2008 Friendly	Bahrain	3–1	Burkina Faso

29 August 2008 Friendly	United Arab Emirates	2–3	Bahrain

6 September 2008 2010 FWCQ	Bahrain	2–3	Japan	Riffa, Bahrain
				Stadium: Bahrain National Stadium; Attendance: 20,000; Referee: Abdul Malik Abdul Bashir (Singapore)

10 September 2008 2010 FWCQ	Qatar	1–1	Bahrain	Doha, Qatar
				Stadium: Jassim bin Hamad Stadium; Attendance: 7,000; Referee: Kim Dong-jin (South Korea)

15 October 2008 Friendly	Bahrain	1–2	Azerbaijan

12 November 2008 Friendly	Saudi Arabia	4–0	Bahrain

19 November 2008 2010 FWCQ	Bahrain	0–1	Australia	Riffa, Bahrain
			Bresciano 90+3'	Stadium: Bahrain National Stadium; Attendance: 10,000; Referee: Masoud Moradi (Iran)

23 December 2008 Friendly	Saudi Arabia	0–1	Bahrain

29 December 2008 Friendly	Bahrain	2–2	Syria

=== 2007 ===
12 January 2007 Friendly	Bahrain	4–0	Yemen

18 January 2007 2007 Gulf Cup	Saudi Arabia	2–1	Bahrain	Abu Dhabi, United Arab Emirates
	Al-Qahtani 26' (pen.), 89'		Yousef 13' (pen.)	Stadium: Al Nahyan Stadium

21 January 2007 2007 Gulf Cup	Bahrain	1–1	Iraq	Abu Dhabi, United Arab Emirates
	Al-Marzouqi 8'		Mulla Mohammed 11'	Stadium: Al Nahyan Stadium

24 January 2007 2007 Gulf Cup	Qatar	1–2	Bahrain	Abu Dhabi, United Arab Emirates
	Khalfan 19'		Hubail 45', 90+1'	Stadium: Al Nahyan Stadium

27 January 2007 2007 Gulf Cup	Oman	1–0	Bahrain	Abu Dhabi, United Arab Emirates
	Al-Maimani 55'			Stadium: Mohammed bin Zayed Stadium

27 June 2007 Friendly	Bahrain	2–2	United Arab Emirates

30 June 2007 Friendly	Vietnam	5–3	Bahrain	Hanoi, Vietnam
	Lê Công Vinh 11', 17'; Mai Tiến Thành 53'; Phan Thanh Bình 76'; Nguyễn Anh Đức 87'		Abdulrahman 3'; Hubail 61'; Okwunwanne 72'	Stadium: Mỹ Đình National Stadium

10 July 2007 2007 AFC Asian Cup	Indonesia	2–1	Bahrain	Jakarta, Indonesia
	Budi 14'; Bambang 64'		Mahmood 27'	Stadium: Gelora Bung Karno Stadium; Attendance: 60,000; Referee: Yuichi Nishimura (Japan)

15 July 2007 2007 AFC Asian Cup	Bahrain	2–1	South Korea	Jakarta, Indonesia
	Isa 43'; Abdullatif 85'		Kim Do-heon 4'	Stadium: Gelora Bung Karno Stadium; Attendance: 9,000; Referee: Sun Baojie (China)

18 July 2007 2007 AFC Asian Cup	Saudi Arabia	4–0	Bahrain	Palembang, Indonesia
	Al-Mousa 18'; A. Al-Qahtani 45'; Al-Jassim 68', 79'			Stadium: Gelora Sriwijaya Stadium; Attendance: 500; Referee: Yuichi Nishimura (Japan)

7 September 2007 Friendly	Bahrain	1–3	Jordan

4 October 2007 Friendly	Bahrain	3–1	Singapore

16 October 2007 Friendly	Bahrain	2–0	Libya

21 October 2007 2010 FWCQ	Bahrain	4–1	Malaysia	Bahrain

28 October 2007 2010 FWCQ	Malaysia	0–0	Bahrain	Malaysia

=== 2006 ===
29 January 2006 Friendly	Bahrain	1–1	Syria

16 February 2006 Friendly	Bahrain	0–2	Palestine

22 February 2006 2007 Asian Cup qualification	Bahrain	1–3	Australia	Riffa, Bahrain
18:35	Ali 35'		Thompson 53'; Skoko 79'; Elrich 87' (pen.)	Stadium: Bahrain National Stadium; Attendance: 2,500; Referee: Subkhiddin Mohd Salleh (Malaysia)

1 March 2006 2007 Asian Cup qualification	Kuwait	0–0	Bahrain	Kuwait City, Kuwait
18:15				Stadium: National Stadium; Attendance: 16,000; Referee: Masoud Moradi (Iran)

9 August 2006 Friendly	Saudi Arabia	1–0	Bahrain

2 September 2006 Friendly	Bahrain	0–2	Jordan

11 October 2006 2007 Asian Cup qualification	Australia	2–0	Bahrain	Sydney
19:30	Aloisi 17'; Bresciano 24'			Stadium: Sydney Football Stadium; Attendance: 36,606; Referee: Fareed Ali Mohamed Al Marzouqi (United Arab Emirates)

8 November 2006 Friendly	Oman	1–1	Bahrain

15 November 2006 2007 Asian Cup qualification	Bahrain	2–1	Kuwait	Riffa, Bahrain
18:00	Yousef 35' (pen.); Ghuloom 43'		Laheeb 70'	Stadium: Bahrain National Stadium; Attendance: 20,000; Referee: Kwon Jong-Chul (Korea Republic)

=== 2005 ===
9 February 2005 2006 FWCQ	Bahrain	0–0	Iran	Riffa, Bahrain
				Stadium: Bahrain National Stadium; Attendance: 25,000

25 March 2005 2006 FWCQ	North Korea	1–2	Bahrain	Pyongyang, North Korea
				Stadium: Kim Il-sung Stadium; Attendance: 50,000

30 March 2005 2006 FWCQ	Japan	1–0	Bahrain	Saitama, Japan
				Stadium: Saitama Stadium; Attendance: 67,549

3 June 2005 2006 FWCQ	Bahrain	0–1	Japan	Riffa, Bahrain
				Stadium: Bahrain National Stadium; Attendance: 32,000

8 June 2005 2006 FWCQ	Iran	1–0	Bahrain	Tehran, Iran
				Stadium: Azadi Stadium; Attendance: 80,000

17 August 2005 2006 FWCQ	Bahrain	2–3	North Korea	Riffa, Bahrain
				Stadium: Bahrain National Stadium; Attendance: 3,000
