= 2009 Australia national soccer team season =

Australia
2009 season
- Chairman: Frank Lowy
- Manager: Pim Verbeek
Home colours	Away colours

This page summarises the Australia national soccer team fixtures and results in 2009.

== Summary ==
The start of the year consisted of alternating qualification matches for the 2011 AFC Asian Cup and the 2010 FIFA World Cup. When Australia met Japan in February, they were top of the group with three wins. A draw against Japan, a win against Uzbekistan and then another draw with Qatar was enough for Australia to qualify for the 2010 FIFA World Cup with two games to spare.

Asian Cup qualifying started poorly with a draw in Indonesia and a home loss to Kuwait although wins later in the year improved Australia's position in the group leading into the final fixtures in 2010.

Netherlands were ranked number three in the world at the time of visiting Sydney to play a friendly that finished nil-all.

Australia finished the year at 21 in the FIFA rankings; however, the September 2009 ranking saw Australia reach its highest ever position of 14.

== Record ==
Type	GP	W	D	L	GF	GA
Friendly matches	3	1	1	1	4	3
World Cup qualifiers	5	3	2	0	6	1
Asian Cup qualifiers	4	2	1	1	3	2
Total	12	6	4	2	13	6

== Match results ==
=== Friendlies ===
12 August Friendly	Republic of Ireland	0–3	Australia	Limerick, Ireland
		Report	39', 44' Cahill; 90+3' Carney	Stadium: Thomand Park; Attendance: 19,428; Referee: Alfonso Pérez Burrull (Spain)

5 September Friendly	South Korea	3–1	Australia	Seoul, South Korea
	Park C-Y 5'; Lee J-S 21'; Seol K-H 87'	Report	34' Kisnorbo	Stadium: Seoul World Cup Stadium; Attendance: 40,215; Referee: Subkhiddin Mohd Salleh (Malaysia)

10 October Friendly	Australia	0–0	Netherlands	Sydney, Australia
		Report		Stadium: Sydney Football Stadium; Attendance: 40,537; Referee: Minoru Tōjō (Japan)

=== World Cup qualifiers ===
11 February Fourth Round	Japan	0–0	Australia	Yokohama, Japan
19:20 UTC+09:00		Report		Stadium: International Stadium; Attendance: 66,000; Referee: Muhsen Basma (Syria)

1 April Fourth Round	Australia	2–0	Uzbekistan	Sydney, Australia
20:00 UTC+11:00	Kennedy 66'; Kewell 73' (pen.)	Report		Stadium: Stadium Australia; Attendance: 59,292; Referee: Ali Hamad Al-Badwawi (United Arab Emirates)

6 June Fourth Round	Qatar	0–0	Australia	Doha, Qatar
19:00 UTC+03:00		Report		Stadium: Jassim Bin Hamad Stadium; Attendance: 7,000; Referee: Abdul Malik Bashir (Singapore)

10 June Fourth Round	Australia	2–0	Bahrain	Sydney, Australia
20:00 UTC+10:00	Sterjovski 55'; Carney 88'	Report		Stadium: Stadium Australia; Attendance: 39,450; Referee: Abdullah Al Hilali (Oman)

17 June Fourth Round	Australia	2–1	Japan	Melbourne, Australia
20:20 UTC+10:00	Cahill 59', 77'	Report	40' Tulio	Stadium: MCG; Attendance: 69,238; Referee: Khalil Al Ghamdi (Saudi Arabia)

=== Asian Cup qualifiers ===
28 January Group Stage	Indonesia	0–0	Australia	Jakarta, Indonesia
19:30 UTC+07:00		Report		Stadium: Gelora Bung Karno Stadium; Attendance: 50,000; Referee: Malik Abdul Bashir (Singapore)

5 March Group Stage	Australia	0–1	Kuwait	Canberra, Australia
20:00 UTC+11:00		Report	38' Neda	Stadium: Canberra Stadium; Attendance: 20,032; Referee: Masoud Moradi (Iran)

14 October Group Stage	Australia	1–0	Oman	Melbourne, Australia
19:30 UTC+10:00	Cahill 73'	Report		Stadium: Docklands Stadium; Attendance: 20,595; Referee: Masaaki Toma (Japan)

14 November Group Stage	Oman	1–2	Australia	Muscat, Oman
18:00 UTC+04:00	Khalifa 16' (pen.)	Report	43' Wilkshire; 83' Emerton	Stadium: Sultan Qaboos Sports Complex; Attendance: 12,000; Referee: Sun Baojie (China)

== Goal scorers ==
Player	Friendlies	FIFA World Cup qual.	AFC Asian Cup qual.	Goals
Cahill	2	2	1	5
Carney	1	1	-	2
Emerton	-	-	1	1
Kennedy	-	1	-	1
Kewell	-	1	-	1
Kisnorbo	1	-	-	1
Sterjovski	-	1	-	1
Wilkshire	-	-	1	1
