= 2010 FIFA World Cup qualification =

Tournament details
- Dates: 25 August 2007 – 18 November 2009
- Teams: 205 (from 6 confederations)

Tournament statistics
- Matches played: 852
- Goals scored: 2,338 (2.74 per match)
- Attendance: 19,336,189 (22,695 per match)
- Top scorer(s): (Burkina Faso) Moumouni Dagano (Fiji) Osea Vakatalesau (12 goals each)

Qualifying for the 2010 FIFA World Cup was a series of tournaments organised by the six FIFA confederations. Each confederation – the AFC (Asia), CAF (Africa), CONCACAF (North, Central America and Caribbean), CONMEBOL (South America), OFC (Oceania), and UEFA (Europe) – was allocated a certain number of the 32 places at the tournament. A total of 205 teams entered the qualification competition, with South Africa, as the host, qualifying for the World Cup automatically. The first qualification matches were played on 25 August 2007 and qualification concluded on 18 November 2009. Overall, 2,338 goals were scored over 852 matches, scoring on average 2.74 per match.

== Entrants ==
At the close of entries on 15 March 2007, 204 football associations had entered the preliminary competition: 203 out of the 207 FIFA members at that time (including the host nation, South Africa, as the qualification procedure in Africa also acted as the qualification for the 2010 African Cup of Nations) and the Montenegro team, which later became FIFA's 208th member. The final number of teams entered breaks the previous record of 199 entrants set during the 2002 FIFA World Cup. Three FIFA members (all from the AFC) failed to register for the tournament by 15 March 2007: Brunei, Laos, and the Philippines.

After the close of entries, Bhutan were allowed to enter and were included in the Asian preliminary draw, while Brunei and the Philippines had their late entries rejected.

However, five teams withdrew during qualifying without playing a match: Bhutan, Central African Republic, Eritrea, Guam, and São Tomé and Príncipe. In addition, Papua New Guinea failed to meet the registration deadline for the South Pacific Games (which was also the initial stage of the Oceania qualification) and took no part in qualification.

== Qualified teams ==
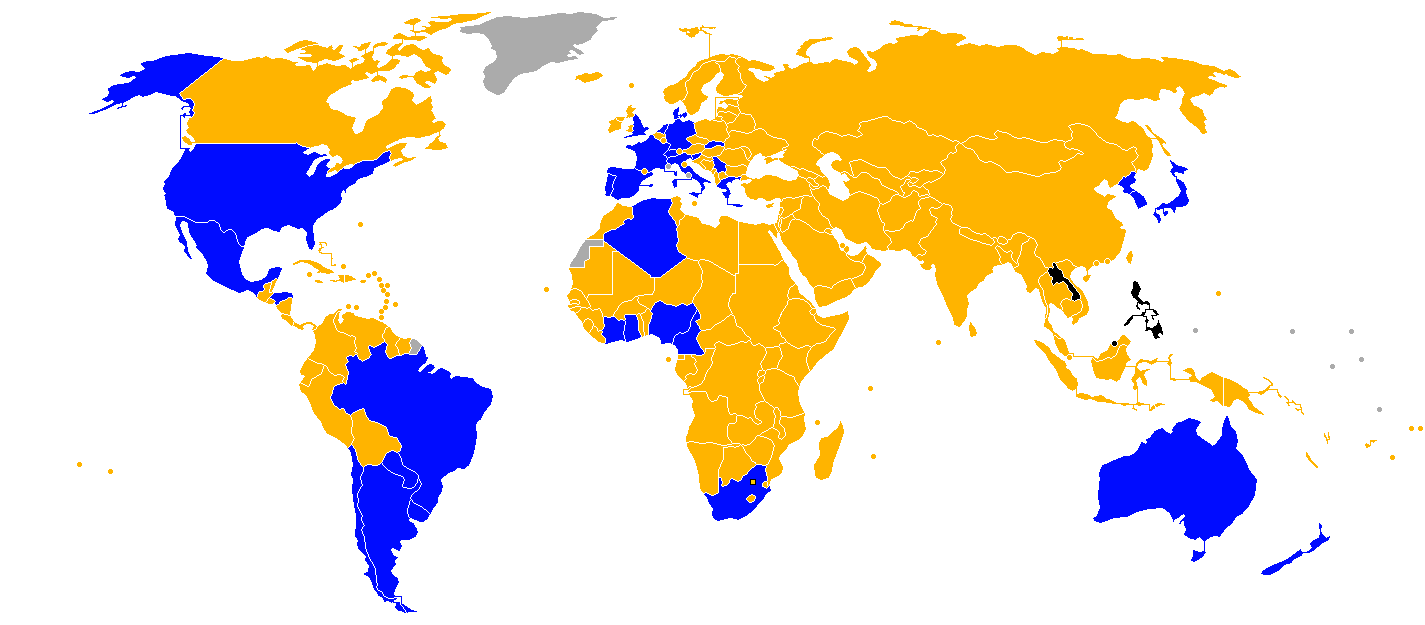
Country qualified for World Cup Country failed to qualify Country did not enter World Cup Country not a FIFA member

The following 32 teams qualified for the 2010 FIFA World Cup:

Team	Method of qualification	Date of qualification	Total times qualified	Current consecutive appearances	Previous best performance	World Ranking
South Africa	Hosts	15 May 2004	3	1 (last: 2002)	Group stage (1998, 2002)	85
Japan	AFC fourth round Group A runners-up	6 June 2009	4	4	Round of 16 (2002)	40
Australia	AFC fourth round Group A winners	6 June 2009	3	2	Round of 16 (2006)	24
South Korea	AFC fourth round Group B winners	6 June 2009	8	7	Fourth place (2002)	48
Netherlands	UEFA Group 9 winners	6 June 2009	9	2	Runners-up (1974, 1978)	3
North Korea	AFC fourth round Group B runners-up	17 June 2009	2	1 (last: 1966)	Quarter-finals (1966)	91
Brazil	CONMEBOL winners	5 September 2009	19	19	Winners (1958, 1962, 1970, 1994, 2002)	1
Ghana	CAF third round Group D winners	6 September 2009	2	2	Round of 16 (2006)	38
England	UEFA Group 6 winners	9 September 2009	13	4	Winners (1966)	7
Spain	UEFA Group 5 winners	9 September 2009	13	9	Fourth place (1950)	2
Paraguay	CONMEBOL third place	9 September 2009	8	4	Round of 16 (1986, 1998, 2002)	21
Ivory Coast	CAF third round Group E winners	10 October 2009	2	2	Group stage (2006)	19
Germany	UEFA Group 4 winners	10 October 2009	17^{2}	15	Winners (1954, 1974, 1990)	5
Denmark	UEFA Group 1 winners	10 October 2009	4	1 (last: 2002)	Quarter-finals (1998)	27
Serbia	UEFA Group 7 winners	10 October 2009	11^{3}	2	Fourth place (1930, 1962)^{3}	20
Italy	UEFA Group 8 winners	10 October 2009	17	13	Winners (1934, 1938, 1982, 2006)	4
Chile	CONMEBOL runners-up	10 October 2009	8	1 (last: 1998)	Third place (1962)	17
Mexico	CONCACAF fourth round runners-up	10 October 2009	14	5	Quarter-finals (1970, 1986)	18
United States	CONCACAF fourth round winners	10 October 2009	9	6	Third place (1930^{6})	11
Switzerland	UEFA Group 2 winners	14 October 2009	9	2	Quarter-finals (1934, 1938, 1954)	13
Slovakia	UEFA Group 3 winners	14 October 2009	9	1	Runners-up (1934, 1962) ^{4}	33
Argentina	CONMEBOL fourth place	14 October 2009	15	10	Winners (1978, 1986)	6
Honduras	CONCACAF fourth round third place	14 October 2009	2	1 (last: 1982)	Group stage (1982)	35
New Zealand	OFC v AFC play-off winners	14 November 2009	2	1 (last: 1982)	Group stage (1982)	83
Nigeria	CAF third round Group B winners	14 November 2009	4	1 (last: 2002)	Round of 16 (1994, 1998)	32
Cameroon	CAF third round Group A winners	14 November 2009	6	1 (last: 2002)	Quarter-finals (1990)	14
Algeria	CAF third round Group C winners	18 November 2009	3	1 (last: 1986)	Group stage (1982, 1986)	29
Greece	UEFA play-off winners	18 November 2009	2	1 (last: 1994)	Group stage (1994)	16
Slovenia	UEFA play-off winners	18 November 2009	2	1 (last: 2002)	Group stage (2002)	49
Portugal	UEFA play-off winners	18 November 2009	5	3	Third place (1966)	10
France	UEFA play-off winners	18 November 2009	13	4	Winners (1998)	9
Uruguay	CONMEBOL v CONCACAF play-off winners	18 November 2009	11	1 (last: 2002)	Winners (1930, 1950)	25

8 of the 32 teams subsequently failed to qualify for the 2014 finals: Denmark, New Zealand, North Korea, Paraguay, Serbia, Slovakia, Slovenia and South Africa.

1.The rankings are shown as of 16 October 2009. These were the rankings used for the final draw.
2.Germany between 1951 and 1990 is often referred to as "West Germany", as a separate East German state and team existed then.
3.This is the 1st appearance of Serbia at the FIFA World Cup. However, FIFA considers Serbia as the successor team of the Yugoslavia and Serbia and Montenegro who all themselves qualified on 10 occasions and who achieved this result.
4.This is the 1st appearance of Slovakia at the FIFA World Cup. However, FIFA considers them and the Czech Republic as the successor team of the Czechoslovakia who achieved this result and qualified for 8 previous occasions.
6.No official match for third place took place in 1930 and no official third place was awarded at the time; both United States and Yugoslavia lost in the semi-finals. However, FIFA lists the teams as third and fourth respectively.

== Qualification process ==
The qualification process commenced in August 2007 and was completed in November 2009. An initial draw for preliminary qualification (qualifying groups in Oceania, and knockout ties in CAF and AFC) had been announced for Zurich on 28 May 2007, but none was held.

Initial groups for the Oceania qualification were eventually held in Auckland, New Zealand, in early June, with preliminary draws for the Asian and African qualification announced in August.

The draw for the main 2010 World Cup qualifying groups was held in Durban, South Africa on 25 November 2007. 34 teams had been eliminated before the actual draw – 6 from OFC, 5 from CAF and 23 from AFC – and CONMEBOL qualification also had started (no draw was required for this confederation, as all 10 members play in the same group, with the order of fixtures the same as for the 2006 qualification rounds). The four remaining teams from OFC had also started playing the final stage as a single group, and no draw was needed. Therefore, the draw of 25 November involved 156 FIFA members from the original 205 entries, divided as follows: UEFA–53 entries in draw; CAF–48 entries in draw (original 53 minus 5 preliminary round losers and withdrawals); AFC–20 entries in draw (original 43 minus 23 1st and 2nd round losers and withdrawals); and CONCACAF–35 entries in draw.

The distribution by confederation for the 2010 World Cup was:

- Europe (UEFA): 13 places
- Africa (CAF): 5 places (+ South Africa qualified automatically as host nation for a total of 6 places)
- Asia (AFC): 4.5 places
- South America (CONMEBOL) 4.5 places
- North, Central American and Caribbean (CONCACAF): 3.5 places
- Oceania (Oceania Football Confederation): 0.5 places

UEFA and CAF had a guaranteed number of places, whereas the number of qualifiers from other confederations was dependent on play-offs between the highest placed teams in the qualification tournaments not guaranteed a place in the finals, with CONCACAF's fourth-place team facing CONMEBOL's fifth-placed team, and AFC's fifth-placed team facing the winners from the OFC.

As the host nation, South Africa qualified automatically. As in 2006, the current cup holders – Italy – did not qualify automatically.

=== Summary of qualification ===
Confederation	Available slots in finals	Teams started	Teams eliminated	Teams qualified	Qualifying start date	Qualifying end date
AFC	4 or 5	43	39	4	8 October 2007	14 November 2009
CAF	5+1	52+1	47	5+1	14 October 2007	18 November 2009
CONCACAF	3 or 4	35	32	3	3 February 2008	18 November 2009
CONMEBOL	4 or 5	10	5	5	13 October 2007	18 November 2009
OFC	0 or 1	10	9	1	25 August 2007	14 November 2009
UEFA	13	53	40	13	20 August 2008	18 November 2009
Total	31+1	203+1	172	31+1	25 August 2007	18 November 2009

=== Tiebreakers ===
For FIFA World Cup qualifying stages the method used for separating teams level on points is the same for all Confederations, as decided by FIFA itself. If teams were even on points at the end of group play, the tied teams would be ranked by:

1. goal difference in all group matches
2. greater number of goals scored in all group matches
3. greater number of points obtained in matches between the tied teams
4. goal difference in matches between the tied teams
5. greater number of goals scored in matches between the tied teams
6. drawing of lots, or a play-off (if approved by FIFA)

This is a change from 2006 FIFA World Cup qualification, where results between tied teams was the first tiebreaker.

== Confederation qualification ==
=== AFC ===
(43 teams competing for 4 or 5 berths; a play-off against OFC determines which confederation gets the extra berth)

Two preliminary rounds (one in October 2007 and one in the first half of November) narrowed the field from 43 to 20 prior to the group stage draw in Durban on 25 November 2007.

The group stage draw divided the 20 remaining sides into five groups of four, which were played from February to June 2008, from which the winners and runners-up advanced to the final group stage. The winners and runners-up from two final groups of five nations (playing from September 2008 to June 2009) will qualify automatically for the World Cup finals, with the two third-placed sides playing off in September 2009 for the right to compete against the Oceania winner for a final qualification spot (with matches played in October and November 2009).

The knock-out preliminary rounds themselves were somewhat unusual, with all 38 AFC sides that did not qualify for the 2006 World Cup playing in the first knock-out round, but the 11 best-ranked winners from that round receiving byes in the second round (and only the eight lowest-ranked winners competing to reduce the fields of teams to 20).

==== Final positions (fourth round) ====
Group A

Pos	Team	Pld	Pts
1	Australia	8	20
2	Japan	8	15
3	Bahrain	8	10
4	Qatar	8	6
5	Uzbekistan	8	4

Group B

Pos	Team	Pld	Pts
1	South Korea	8	16
2	North Korea	8	12
3	Saudi Arabia	8	12
4	Iran	8	11
5	United Arab Emirates	8	1

==== Play-off for fifth place (fifth round) ====
Team 1	Agg.	Team 2	1st leg	2nd leg
Bahrain	2–2 (a)	Saudi Arabia	0–0	2–2

2–2 on aggregate; Bahrain advanced on the away goals rule to the AFC-OFC play-off against New Zealand, the winners from the OFC zone (2008 OFC Nations Cup).

=== CAF ===
(53 teams competing for 5 berths, host South Africa occupying a 6th berth)

The CAF qualification process began with a preliminary round played on 13 October and 17 November 2007 to narrow the field to 48 teams, and then 12 groups of four teams were drawn in Durban in November 2007.

The 12 groups winners and eight best runners-up advanced to the next stage. The procedure was complicated due to two of the groups being reduced to just three teams due to the withdrawal of Eritrea (before the commencement of the group) and the exclusion of Ethiopia (which saw all their results annulled). As a result, the comparison of the 12 runners-up did not include results against teams finishing fourth in 4-team groups.

The remaining 20 teams were placed in five groups of four teams at a draw held in Zürich on 22 October 2008. The winners of these groups qualified for the World Cup finals.

The qualifying competition for the 2010 World Cup was combined with the qualification process for the 2010 African Cup of Nations. Since South Africa was hosting the World Cup, it automatically qualified for that tournament, although it (unlike hosts in previous qualifying tournaments since 1938) played in the qualifiers themselves to facilitate the use of the same set of qualifying matches for the 2010 African Cup of Nations.

Had South Africa advanced to the third round (second group stage), their matches would not have been counted in determining who advances to the World Cup finals. However, South Africa were eliminated from the qualifiers after the second round. This meant that they could not qualify for the African Cup of Nations, and all matches in Round 3 counted towards World Cup qualification.

==== Final positions (third round) ====
Group A
Team	Pld	Pts
Cameroon	6	13
Gabon	6	9
Togo	6	8
Morocco	6	3

Group B
Team	Pld	Pts
Nigeria	6	12
Tunisia	6	11
Mozambique	6	7
Kenya	6	3

Group C
Team	Pld	Pts
Algeria	6	13
Egypt	6	13
Zambia	6	5
Rwanda	6	2

Group D
Team	Pld	Pts
Ghana	6	13
Benin	6	10
Mali	6	9
Sudan	6	1

Group E
Team	Pld	Pts
Ivory Coast	6	16
Burkina Faso	6	12
Malawi	6	4
Guinea	6	3

In Group C, Algeria and Egypt finished with identical overall and head-to-head records. A tiebreaking play-off was contested on 18 November 2009 in Sudan to determine which team would qualify for the 2010 FIFA World Cup, with Algeria prevailing 1–0.

=== CONCACAF ===
(35 teams competing for 3 or 4 berths; a play-off against CONMEBOL determines which confederation gets the extra berth)

The CONCACAF qualification process is identical to that for the 2006 FIFA World Cup qualification, except that as Puerto Rico competed this time (they were the only CONCACAF member not to enter 2006 qualification), there were 11 matches instead of 10 in the first preliminary round, and thus 13 teams instead of 14 received a bye to the second preliminary round. The two preliminary rounds, played in the first half of 2008, reduced the 35 entrants to 24 and then 12 teams. Three semi-final groups of four were played between August and November 2008, with the top two in each group advancing to a final six-team group held during 2009. The top three of this group qualified for the World Cup finals; the fourth-placed team advancing to the play-off against the fifth-placed CONMEBOL team.

==== Final positions (fourth round) ====
Pos	Team	Pld	Pts
1	United States	10	20
2	Mexico	10	19
3	Honduras	10	16
4	Costa Rica	10	16
5	El Salvador	10	8
6	Trinidad and Tobago	10	6

Honduras advanced on goal difference tiebreaker. Costa Rica moved to the CONCACAF/CONMEBOL intercontinental play-off.

=== CONMEBOL ===
(10 teams competing for 4 or 5 berths; a play-off against CONCACAF determined which confederation filled the extra berth)

The CONMEBOL qualification process again featured a league system (home and away matches) for a single group of 10 associations, with matches played from October 2007 to October 2009. The fixture list was identical to that used in the qualification for the 2006 FIFA World Cup. To limit the amount of travel by European-based players to South America, CONMEBOL's schedule used nine 'double match days' (with two sets of matches held within a few days of each other). The top four teams qualified for the World Cup finals; the fifth-placed team advancing to a play-off against the fourth-placed CONCACAF team.

==== Final positions ====
Pos	Team	Pld	Pts
1	Brazil	18	34
2	Chile	18	33
3	Paraguay	18	33
4	Argentina	18	28
5	Uruguay	18	24
6	Ecuador	18	23
7	Colombia	18	23
8	Venezuela	18	22
9	Bolivia	18	15
10	Peru	18	13

Source: FIFA

=== OFC ===
(10 teams competing for 0 or 1 berth; a play-off against AFC determines which confederation gets the extra berth. Tuvalu also played in the qualifying tournament, but was not an entrant to the World Cup qualification)

The qualification process began with a tournament at the 2007 South Pacific Games in August 2007. The top three (New Caledonia, Fiji, and Vanuatu, respectively) joined New Zealand in a 4-team group, which was also the 2008 OFC Nations Cup, playing home and away. The winners would play a home-and-away play-off with the fifth-placed Asian nation for a World Cup berth.

==== Final positions (second round) ====
Pos	Team	Pld	Pts
1	New Zealand (C)	6	15
2	New Caledonia	6	8
3	Fiji	6	7
4	Vanuatu	6	4

(C) Champions

New Zealand advanced to the AFC-OFC play-off, against Bahrain, the fifth-placed team from the AFC.

=== UEFA ===
(53 teams competing for 13 berths)

The European qualification games started in August 2008 after Euro 2008. Eight groups of six teams and one group of five contested the European qualifying competition. As a result, the nine group winners qualified directly, while the best eight of the nine second-placed teams contested home and away play-off matches for the remaining four places. In determining the best eight second-placed teams, the results against teams finishing last in the six-team groups were not counted for consistency between the five- and six-team groups.

The First Round was completed on 14 October 2009. A draw for the Second Round was held in Zürich on 19 October, with the matches played on 14 and 18 November.

==== Final positions (first round) ====
Group 1

Pos	Team	Pld	Pts
1	Denmark	10	21
2	Portugal	10	19
3	Sweden	10	18
4	Hungary	10	16
5	Albania	10	7
6	Malta	10	1

Group 2

Pos	Team	Pld	Pts
1	Switzerland	10	21
2	Greece	10	20
3	Latvia	10	17
4	Israel	10	16
5	Luxembourg	10	5
6	Moldova	10	3

Group 3

Pos	Team	Pld	Pts
1	Slovakia	10	22
2	Slovenia	10	20
3	Czech Republic	10	16
4	Northern Ireland	10	15
5	Poland	10	11
6	San Marino	10	0

Group 4

Pos	Team	Pld	Pts
1	Germany	10	26
2	Russia	10	22
3	Finland	10	18
4	Wales	10	12
5	Azerbaijan	10	5
6	Liechtenstein	10	2

Group 5

Pos	Team	Pld	Pts
1	Spain	10	30
2	Bosnia and Herzegovina	10	19
3	Turkey	10	15
4	Belgium	10	10
5	Estonia	10	8
6	Armenia	10	4

Group 6

Pos	Team	Pld	Pts
1	England	10	27
2	Ukraine	10	21
3	Croatia	10	20
4	Belarus	10	13
5	Kazakhstan	10	6
6	Andorra	10	0

Group 7

Pos	Team	Pld	Pts
1	Serbia	10	22
2	France	10	21
3	Austria	10	14
4	Lithuania	10	12
5	Romania	10	12
6	Faroe Islands	10	4

Group 8

Pos	Team	Pld	Pts
1	Italy	10	24
2	Republic of Ireland	10	18
3	Bulgaria	10	14
4	Cyprus	10	9
5	Montenegro	10	9
6	Georgia	10	3

Group 9

Pos	Team	Pld	Pts
1	Netherlands	8	24
2	Norway	8	10
3	Scotland	8	10
4	Macedonia	8	7
5	Iceland	8	5

==== Second round ====
The Second Round was contested by the top eight runners-up. With one group having one team fewer than the others, matches against the sixth-placed team in each of the other groups were not included in this ranking.

Pos	Grp	Team	Pld	W	D	L	GF	GA	GD	Pts	Qualification
1	4	Russia	8	5	1	2	15	6	+9	16	Advance to second round (play-offs)
2	2	Greece	8	5	1	2	16	9	+7	16	Advance to second round (play-offs)
3	6	Ukraine	8	4	3	1	10	6	+4	15	Advance to second round (play-offs)
4	7	France	8	4	3	1	12	9	+3	15	Advance to second round (play-offs)
5	3	Slovenia	8	4	2	2	10	4	+6	14	Advance to second round (play-offs)
6	5	Bosnia and Herzegovina	8	4	1	3	19	12	+7	13	Advance to second round (play-offs)
7	1	Portugal	8	3	4	1	9	5	+4	13	Advance to second round (play-offs)
8	8	Republic of Ireland	8	2	6	0	8	6	+2	12	Advance to second round (play-offs)
9	9	Norway	8	2	4	2	9	7	+2	10	

The draw for the second round play-offs was held in Zürich on 19 October, and the matches were played on 14 and 18 November 2009. The eight teams were seeded according to the FIFA World Rankings released on 16 October. The top four teams were seeded into one pot, with the bottom four teams seeded into a second. A separate draw was conducted between each matchup to decide who would host the first leg.

Team 1	Agg.	Team 2	1st leg	2nd leg
Republic of Ireland	1–2	France	0–1	1–1 (aet)
Portugal	2–0	Bosnia and Herzegovina	1–0	1–0
Greece	1–0	Ukraine	0–0	1–0
Russia	2–2 (a)	Slovenia	2–1	0–1

France, Portugal, Greece and Slovenia qualified for the 2010 FIFA World Cup.

== Inter-confederation play-offs ==
There were two scheduled inter-confederation play-offs to determine the final two qualification spots to the finals. The matches were played in October and November 2009.

The draw for the order in which the matches were to be played was held on 2 June 2009 during the FIFA Congress in Nassau, The Bahamas.

=== AFC v OFC ===
Team 1	Agg.	Team 2	1st leg	2nd leg
Bahrain	0–1	New Zealand	0–0	0–1

=== CONCACAF v CONMEBOL ===
Team 1	Agg.	Team 2	1st leg	2nd leg
Costa Rica	1–2	Uruguay	0–1	1–1

== Qualification controversies ==
Controversy surrounded several of the final qualification matches in November 2009.

In the second leg of the play-off between France and the Republic of Ireland, French captain Thierry Henry, unseen by the referee, twice illegally handled the ball in the lead up to the decisive goal, which saw France make the final 32 teams ahead of Ireland. The incident caused widespread debate on FIFA Fair Play, and how matches should be refereed at the highest level. The Football Association of Ireland requested a replay on grounds of fairness, but this was denied by FIFA under the Laws of the Game. A widely reported later request by Ireland to be included as an unprecedented 33rd World Cup entrant was later withdrawn by the FAI, and dismissed by the FAI as peripheral to their other more substantial petitions for change in world football made to FIFA.

Costa Rica also complained over Uruguay's winning goal in the CONMEBOL–CONCACAF play-off.

There was crowd trouble around two matches between Egypt and Algeria, with the Algerian team bus stoned before the first in Cairo, and reports of Egyptian fans ambushed after the second in Khartoum, Sudan. Local media made lurid reports, and diplomatic relations between the countries nosedived.

In response to the incidents during qualification, and to a match fixing controversy, on 2 December 2009 FIFA called for an extraordinary general meeting of their executive committee. After the meeting, FIFA announced that they would be setting up an inquiry into technology and extra officials in the game, but they did not announce the widely expected move of fast-tracking the introduction of goal-line referee's assistants, already being trialled in the Europa League, and instead restated that the competition in South Africa would be officiated as before, with just one referee, two assistants, and a fourth official. On the subject of fair play, FIFA President Sepp Blatter said:

I appeal to all the players and coaches to observe this fair play. In 2010 we want to prove that football is more than just kicking a ball but has social and cultural value...So we ask the players 'please observe fair play' so they will be an example to the rest of the world.

— FIFA President Sepp Blatter,

== Notes ==
- Since the inception of the World Cup preliminary competition, several teams have gone through qualification winning all of their matches. Though, during the qualification process for 2010, Spain set a new record by doing this on a 10-game schedule. Netherlands won 8 games out of 8 to qualify for the World Cup, something only West Germany had achieved before, during the World Cup preliminary competition for 1982. Brazil won their 6 games on their way to World Cup 1970 and managed then to win all of their 6 games in the final competition.

== Top goalscorers ==
There were 2,338 goals scored in 852 matches, for an average of 2.74 goals per match.

12 goals

- (Burkina Faso) Moumouni Dagano
- (Fiji) Osea Vakatalesau

10 goals

- (Chile) Humberto Suazo
- (Greece) Theofanis Gekas

9 goals

- (Bosnia and Herzegovina) Edin Džeko
- (Brazil) Luís Fabiano
- (Cameroon) Samuel Eto'o
- (England) Wayne Rooney
- (Vanuatu) Seule Soromon

8 goals

- (Benin) Razak Omotoyossi
- (Bolivia) Joaquín Botero
- (El Salvador) Rudis Corrales
- (Mali) Frédéric Kanouté
- (New Zealand) Shane Smeltz
- (Thailand) Sarayoot Chaikamdee
- (Uzbekistan) Maksim Shatskikh

Below are goalscorer lists for all confederations and the inter-confederation play-offs:

- AFC
- CAF
- CONCACAF
- CONMEBOL
- OFC
- UEFA
- Inter-confederation play-offs
