= Ahmad Zanki =

Kuwaiti footballer (born 1995)

Personal information
- Full name: Ahmad Jaber Ali H. Zanki
- Date of birth: 17 December 1995 (age 30)
- Place of birth: Kuwait
- Height: 1.73 m (5 ft 8 in)
- Position: Winger

Team information
- Current team: Al Kuwait
- Number: 29

Senior career*
Years	Team	Apps	(Gls)
2015–2018	Al-Qadsia		(1)
2018–2020	Al-Shabab		(4)
2020–	Al-Kuwait		

International career^{‡}
2019–	Kuwait	9	(1)
- * Club domestic league appearances and goals ‡ National team caps and goals as of 24 March 2023

Ahmad Jaber Ali H. Zanki (born 17 December 1995) is a Kuwaiti professional footballer who plays as a winger for Al-Kuwait and the Kuwait national team.

== Career ==
=== International ===
Zanki made his senior international debut on 19 November 2019, coming on as a 66th-minute substitute for Faisal Zayid in a 1–0 away victory over Nepal during World Cup qualifying. He scored his first senior international goal in his subsequent cap, netting in the 85th minute of a 4–2 defeat to Bahrain at the 24th Arabian Gulf Cup.

=== International goals ===
Scores and results list Kuwait's goal tally first.

Goal	Date	Venue	Opponent	Score	Result	Competition
1.	2 December 2019	Khalifa International Stadium, Doha, Qatar	Bahrain	2–3	2–4	24th Arabian Gulf Cup

== Career statistics ==
=== International ===
As of matches played 24 March 2023.

National team	Year	Apps	Goals
Kuwait	2019	2	1
Kuwait	2021	6	0
Kuwait	2023	1	0
Total		9	1

== Honours ==
Al-Kuwait

- AFC Challenge League: 2025-2026
