= 2010 FIFA World Cup qualification (inter-confederation play-offs) =

Tournament details
- Dates: 10 October – 18 November 2009
- Teams: 4 (from 4 confederations)

Tournament statistics
- Matches played: 4
- Goals scored: 4 (1 per match)
- Attendance: 148,000 (37,000 per match)
- Top scorer(s): (Costa Rica) Walter Centeno (New Zealand) Rory Fallon (Uruguay) Sebastián Abreu (Uruguay) Diego Lugano (1 goal each)

For the 2010 FIFA World Cup qualification, there were two scheduled inter-confederation play-offs to determine the final two qualification spots to the 2010 FIFA World Cup.

== Qualified teams ==
The four teams participating were:

Confederation	Placement	Team
AFC	Fifth round (play-off) winner	Bahrain
CONCACAF	Fourth round 4th place	Costa Rica
CONMEBOL	Round-robin 5th place	Uruguay
OFC	Second round winner	New Zealand

== Format ==
The ties themselves were not drawn, but were allocated by FIFA as:

- AFC fifth round winner v OFC second round winner
- CONCACAF fourth round fourth place v CONMEBOL fifth place

This allocation allowed better start times of the matches than the previous one because teams were now in closer time zones. The draw for the order in which the two matches were played was held on 2 June 2009 during the FIFA Congress in Nassau, The Bahamas.

== Matches ==
=== AFC v OFC ===
Team 1	Agg.	Team 2	1st leg	2nd leg
Bahrain	0–1	New Zealand	0–0	0–1

10 October 2009
18:30 UTC+03:00

Bahrain	0–0	New Zealand
	(Report)

Bahrain National Stadium, Riffa
Attendance: 37,000
Referee: Viktor Kassai (Hungary)
14 November 2009
20:00 UTC+13:00

New Zealand	1–0	Bahrain
Fallon 45'	(Report)

Westpac Stadium, Wellington
Attendance: 36,500
Referee: Jorge Larrionda (Uruguay)

New Zealand won 1–0 on aggregate and qualified for the 2010 FIFA World Cup.

=== CONCACAF v CONMEBOL ===
Team 1	Agg.	Team 2	1st leg	2nd leg
Costa Rica	1–2	Uruguay	0–1	1–1

14 November 2009
20:00 UTC–6

Costa Rica	0–1	Uruguay
	(Report)	Lugano 21'

Estadio Ricardo Saprissa Aymá, San José
Attendance: 19,500
Referee: Alberto Undiano Mallenco (Spain)
18 November 2009
21:00 UTC–2

Uruguay	1–1	Costa Rica
Abreu 70'	(Report)	Centeno 74'

Estadio Centenario, Montevideo
Attendance: 55,000
Referee: Massimo Busacca (Switzerland)

Uruguay won 2–1 on aggregate and qualified for the 2010 FIFA World Cup.

== Goalscorers ==
There were 4 goals scored in 4 matches, for an average of 1 goal per match.

1 goal

- (Costa Rica) Walter Centeno
- (New Zealand) Rory Fallon
- (Uruguay) Sebastián Abreu
- (Uruguay) Diego Lugano
