= 2010 FIFA World Cup qualification (AFC) =

Tournament details
- Dates: 8 October 2007 – 14 November 2009
- Teams: 43 (from 1 confederation)

Tournament statistics
- Matches played: 143
- Goals scored: 374 (2.62 per match)
- Attendance: 3,267,023 (22,846 per match)
- Top scorer(s): (Thailand) Sarayoot Chaikamdee (Uzbekistan) Maksim Shatskikh (8 goals each)

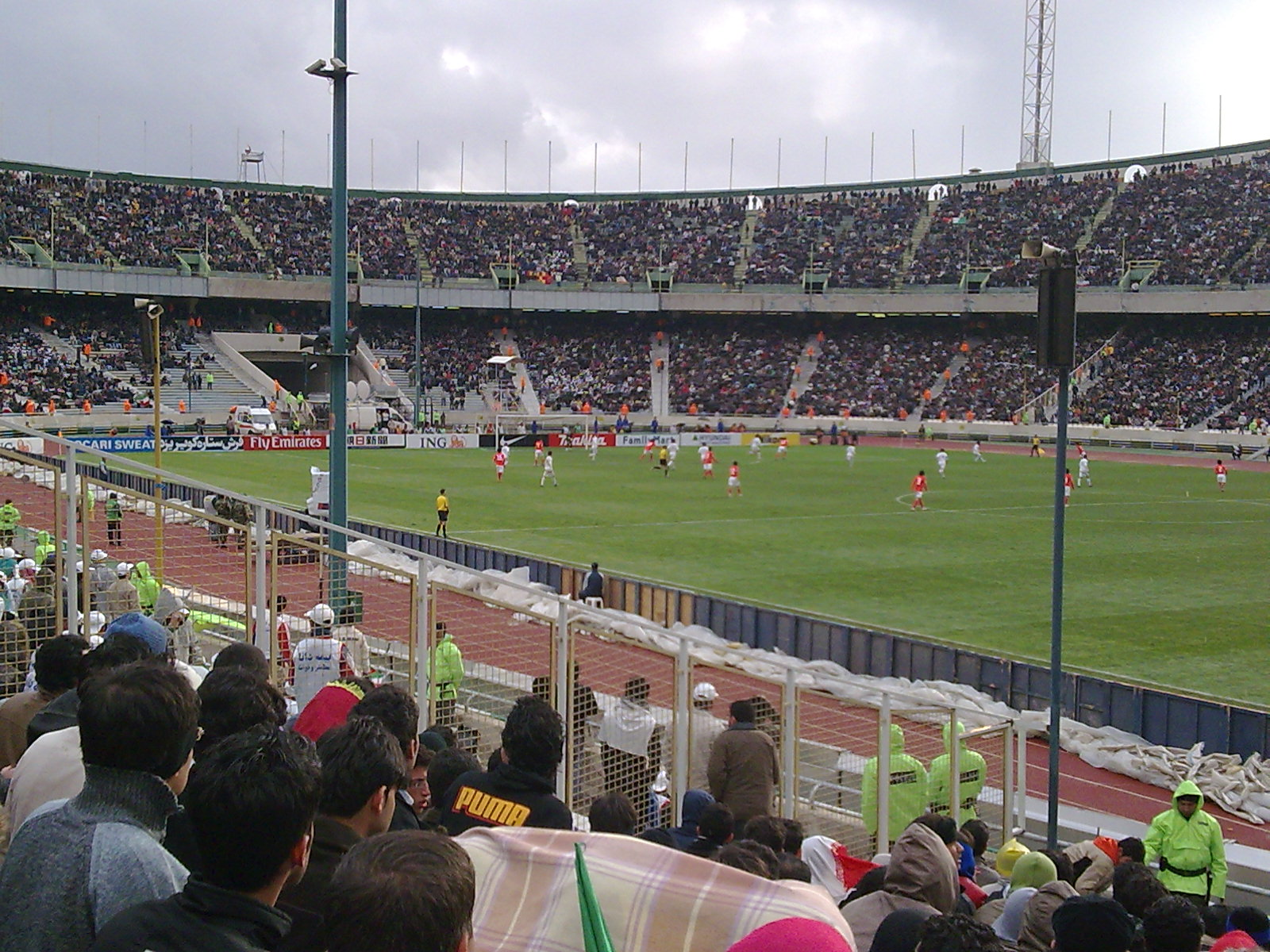
Iran vs South Korea at Azadi Stadium, Tehran

The Asian Football Confederation (AFC) section of 2010 FIFA World Cup qualification was allocated four assured qualifying berths for the final tournament in South Africa and one place in a play-off. 43 teams were in the running for these spots, while Laos, Brunei and the Philippines did not enter qualification. This was the first time Timor-Leste competed in World Cup qualification and the first time Australia attempted to qualify for the World Cup as a member of the AFC, having moved from the Oceania Football Confederation at the start of 2006. Note that this edition saw the first effective participation of Myanmar. The country, called "Burma" until 1989, was registered three times (1950, 1994, 2002) but withdrew each time before playing.

Asia's four automatic qualifying berths were taken by Australia, Japan and both North and South Korea. Bahrain failed to become a fifth Asian representative in the World Cup after losing the play-off match against Oceanian representatives New Zealand.

== Seeding ==
The initial seeding (used in the draw for the first two rounds) was based on each team's performance during the qualification stage for the previous World Cup. The admission of Australia to the AFC complicated matters slightly (as they had not taken part in the previous AFC qualification cycle, but had progressed to the World Cup finals in Germany – and had advanced further than the AFC qualifiers).

Initially, the AFC placed Australia as the first seed even though this contradicted the letter of the seeding – past practice (such as adopted by the AFC in the draw for the qualification to the 2008 Olympic Football Tournament) would have seeded Australia last.

By the time of the main qualification draw in Durban (which included the AFC third round), the seeding had been adjusted to rank the top 5 AFC nations according to their performance in the World Cup Final Tournament (of 2006). This resulted in minor changes to the seeding at that point.

=== Seeding for the first two rounds ===
Teams ranked 1–5 received a bye from the first two knockout rounds and are entered into the third round.
Teams ranked 6–43 entered at the first round, with teams ranked from 6–24 drawn against teams ranked from 25 to 43.
Of the first round winners, the eight lowest remaining seeds would go on to play in the second round. The other teams would receive a bye to the third round.

Top Seeds
(Ranked 1st to 5th)
1. Australia
2. South Korea
3. Saudi Arabia
4. Japan
5. Iran
Pot A
(Ranked 6th to 24th)
6. Bahrain
7. Uzbekistan
8. Kuwait
9. North Korea
10. China
11. Jordan
12. Iraq
13. Lebanon
14. Oman
15. United Arab Emirates
16. Qatar
17. Syria
18. Palestine
19. Thailand
20. Turkmenistan
21. Tajikistan
22. Indonesia
23. Hong Kong
24. Yemen
Pot B
(Ranked 25th to 43rd)
25. Vietnam
26. Kyrgyzstan
27. Maldives
28. India
29. Singapore
30. Sri Lanka
31. Malaysia
32. Chinese Taipei
33. Bangladesh
34. Macau
35. Pakistan
36. Afghanistan
37. Mongolia
38. Guam
39. Nepal
40. Cambodia
41. Bhutan
42. Myanmar
43. Timor-Leste

- Guam and Bhutan withdrew after the draw, but before playing any matches.

== First round ==
The official draw took place on 6 August 2007 at the AFC House in Kuala Lumpur, Malaysia. Teams from Pot A were randomly paired with a team from Pot B.

Team 1	Agg.	Team 2	1st leg	2nd leg
Pakistan	0–7	Iraq	0–7	0–0^{1}
Uzbekistan	11–0	Chinese Taipei	9–0	2–0
Thailand	13–2	Macau	6–1	7–1
Sri Lanka	0–6	Qatar	0–1	0–5
China	11–0	Myanmar	7–0	4–0^{4}
Bhutan	w/o^{2}	Kuwait		
Kyrgyzstan	2–2 (5–6 pens)	Jordan	2–0	0–2 (aet)
Vietnam	0–6	United Arab Emirates	0–1	0–5
Bahrain	4–1	Malaysia	4–1	0–0
Timor-Leste	3–11	Hong Kong	2–3^{5}	1–8
Syria	5–1	Afghanistan	3–0	2–1^{1}
Yemen	3–2	Maldives	3–0	0–2
Bangladesh	1–6	Tajikistan	1–1	0–5
Mongolia	2–9	North Korea	1–4	1–5
Oman	4–0	Nepal	2–0	2–0
Palestine	0–7	Singapore	0–4^{1}	0–3^{6}
Lebanon	6–3	India	4–1	2–2
Cambodia	1–5	Turkmenistan	0–1	1–4
Guam	w/o^{3}	Indonesia		

1. For security reasons, Iraq played their home leg in Syria, Palestine played their home leg in Qatar and Afghanistan played their home leg in Tajikistan.
2. Bhutan withdrew.
3. Guam withdrew.
4. FIFA decided to move Myanmar home match to Malaysia.
5. Timor-Leste elected to play their home leg in Indonesia.
6. Palestine failed to appear; Singapore was awarded a 3–0 win. The Palestine Football Federation appealed to have the match rescheduled on the grounds that its players did not receive permits to leave the Gaza Strip, but FIFA dismissed the appeal.

== Second round ==
Of the nineteen teams that progressed from the first round, the eight lowest seeded teams by FIFA rankings were required to play in the second round (the other eleven teams received a bye to the third round). As with the first round the draw took place on 6 August 2007 at AFC House in Kuala Lumpur, Malaysia.

As the teams involved were not known at the time, the draw placed teams ranked 16–19 against teams ranked 12–15. The ties drawn were

- 17th against 14th
- 16th against 12th
- 18th against 13th
- 19th against 15th

Team 1	Agg.	Team 2	1st leg	2nd leg
Hong Kong	0–3	Turkmenistan	0–0	0–3
Indonesia	1–11	Syria	1–4	0–7
Singapore	3–1	Tajikistan	2–0	1–1
Yemen	1–2	Thailand	1–1	0–1

== Third round ==
The top 5 seeds were joined by the eleven highest-ranked winners from the first round and the four second round winners.

=== Qualified teams ===
Byes to Round 3
1. Australia
2. South Korea
3. Saudi Arabia
4. Japan
5. Iran
Top 11 Round 1 winners
6. Bahrain
7. Uzbekistan
8. Kuwait^{1}
9. North Korea
10. China
11. Jordan
12. Iraq
13. Lebanon
14. Oman
15. United Arab Emirates
16. Qatar
Round 2 winners
17. Syria
18. Thailand
19. Turkmenistan
20. Singapore

^{1} On 30 October 2007, the Kuwait Football Association was suspended from international football competitions by FIFA. On 9 November 2007, Kuwait was conditionally reinstated to international football competitions by FIFA.

=== Seeding ===
These 20 teams were drawn into five groups of four teams at the main group draw in Durban, South Africa on 25 November 2007. The seeding for the main draw was the same for the first two rounds, with the exception that the five seeded nations (those that qualified for the 2006 finals) were ordered on the basis of results in the 2006 finals tournament. This saw Iran move from fifth to third, and Japan and Saudi Arabia ranked equal fourth.

The four seeding Pots used were:

Pot A	Pot B	Pot C	Pot D
Australia; South Korea; Iran; Japan; Saudi Arabia	Bahrain; Uzbekistan; Kuwait; North Korea; China	Jordan; Iraq; Lebanon; Oman; United Arab Emirates	Qatar; Syria; Thailand; Turkmenistan; Singapore

=== Groups ===
The teams in each group played each other twice, once home and once away. The teams that finished first and second in their group qualified for the fourth round.

==== Group 1 ====
Pos	Team	Pld	W	D	L	GF	GA	GD	Pts	Qualification	(Australia)	(Qatar)	(Iraq)	(China)
1	Australia	6	3	1	2	7	3	+4	10	Fourth round	—	3–0	1–0	0–1
2	Qatar	6	3	1	2	5	6	−1	10	Fourth round	1–3	—	2–0	0–0
3	Iraq	6	2	1	3	4	6	−2	7		1–0	0–1	—	1–1
4	China	6	1	3	2	3	4	−1	6		0–0	0–1	1–2	—

On 26 May 2008, FIFA decided to suspend Iraq from all international competitions after the Iraq Football Association was disbanded by the government on 20 May 2008. The suspension was provisionally and conditionally lifted on 29 May 2008.

Qatar fielded ineligible player Emerson in the 2–0 defeat to Iraq on 26 March 2008, prompting FIFA to controversially suspend him but clear Qatar of any wrongdoing, in direct contradiction to its decisions against Singapore.

Iraq appealed the decision to the Court of Arbitration for Sport but it was rejected by the CAS, saying that Iraq submitted documents and appeal fees too late.

==== Group 2 ====
Pos	Team	Pld	W	D	L	GF	GA	GD	Pts	Qualification	(Japan)	(Bahrain)	(Oman)	(Thailand)
1	Japan	6	4	1	1	12	3	+9	13	Fourth round	—	1–0	3–0	4–1
2	Bahrain	6	3	2	1	7	5	+2	11	Fourth round	1–0	—	1–1	1–1
3	Oman	6	2	2	2	5	7	−2	8		1–1	0–1	—	2–1
4	Thailand	6	0	1	5	5	14	−9	1		0–3	2–3	0–1	—

==== Group 3 ====
Pos	Team	Pld	W	D	L	GF	GA	GD	Pts	Qualification	(South Korea)	(North Korea)	(Jordan)	(Turkmenistan)
1	South Korea	6	3	3	0	10	3	+7	12	Fourth round	—	0–0	2–2	4–0
2	North Korea	6	3	3	0	4	0	+4	12	Fourth round	0–0	—	2–0	1–0
3	Jordan	6	2	1	3	6	6	0	7		0–1	0–1	—	2–0
4	Turkmenistan	6	0	1	5	1	12	−11	1		1–3	0–0	0–2	—

==== Group 4 ====
Pos	Team	Pld	W	D	L	GF	GA	GD	Pts	Qualification	(Uzbekistan)	(Saudi Arabia)	(Singapore)	(Lebanon)
1	Uzbekistan	6	5	0	1	17	7	+10	15 (Note: The positions of Uzbekistan and Saudi Arabia are reversed from the original final standings after two matches were forfeited by Singapore.)	Fourth round	—	3–0	3–0 (Note: Awarded as a 3–0 win as Singapore fielded an ineligible player.)	3–0
2	Saudi Arabia	6	5	0	1	15	5	+10	15	Fourth round	4–0	—	2–0	4–1
3	Singapore	6	2	0	4	7	16	−9	6		3–7	0–3	—	2–0
4	Lebanon	6	0	0	6	3	14	−11	0		0–1	1–2	1–2	—

==== Group 5 ====
Pos	Team	Pld	W	D	L	GF	GA	GD	Pts	Qualification	(Iran)	(United Arab Emirates)	(Syria)	(Kuwait)
1	Iran	6	3	3	0	7	2	+5	12	Fourth round	—	0–0	0–0	2–0
2	United Arab Emirates	6	2	2	2	7	7	0	8	Fourth round	0–1	—	1–3	2–0
3	Syria	6	2	2	2	7	8	−1	8		0–2	1–1	—	1–0
4	Kuwait	6	1	1	4	8	12	−4	4		2–2	2–3	4–2	—

== Fourth round ==
In the fourth round, the 10 remaining teams were drawn into 2 groups of 5 teams.

=== Qualified teams ===
Round 3	Group winners	Group runners-up
Group 1	Australia	Qatar
Group 2	Japan	Bahrain
Group 3	South Korea	North Korea
Group 4	Saudi Arabia*	Uzbekistan*
Group 5	Iran	United Arab Emirates

* Positions based on original final standings

=== Seeding ===
The 10 qualifiers were drawn into two groups of five teams at the draw in Kuala Lumpur, Malaysia on 27 June 2008. The seeding for the fourth round was based on that used in the third round draw, but Saudi Arabia and Japan (seeded equal 4th in that draw) were separated by a random selection held at the start of the fourth round draw.

The top 6 ranked qualifiers were split into 3 pots of 2 teams, with the bottom 4 ranked nations grouped together in a separate pot. Each group was allocated 1 team from each of Pots 1, 2 and 3, and 2 teams from Pot 4.

Pot 1	Pot 2	Pot 3	Pot 4
Australia; South Korea	Iran; Japan	Saudi Arabia; Bahrain	Uzbekistan; North Korea; United Arab Emirates; Qatar

=== Groups ===
The teams in each group played each other twice, once home and once away. The top 2 teams in each group qualified for the 2010 FIFA World Cup Finals in South Africa. The third-placed teams met in a play-off to determine who would play the OFC winner, New Zealand, in a separate playoff for a spot in the Finals.

=== Group A ===
Pos	Team	Pld	W	D	L	GF	GA	GD	Pts	Qualification	(Australia)	(Japan)	(Bahrain)	(Qatar)	(Uzbekistan)
1	Australia	8	6	2	0	12	1	+11	20	2010 FIFA World Cup	—	2–1	2–0	4–0	2–0
2	Japan	8	4	3	1	11	6	+5	15	2010 FIFA World Cup	0–0	—	1–0	1–1	1–1
3	Bahrain	8	3	1	4	6	8	−2	10	Fifth round	0–1	2–3	—	1–0	1–0
4	Qatar	8	1	3	4	5	14	−9	6		0–0	0–3	1–1	—	3–0
5	Uzbekistan	8	1	1	6	5	10	−5	4		0–1	0–1	0–1	4–0	—

=== Group B ===
Pos	Team	Pld	W	D	L	GF	GA	GD	Pts	Qualification	(South Korea)	(North Korea)	(Saudi Arabia)	(Iran)	(United Arab Emirates)
1	South Korea	8	4	4	0	12	4	+8	16	2010 FIFA World Cup	—	1–0	0–0	1–1	4–1
2	North Korea	8	3	3	2	7	5	+2	12	2010 FIFA World Cup	1–1	—	1–0	0–0	2–0
3	Saudi Arabia	8	3	3	2	8	8	0	12	Fifth round	0–2	0–0	—	1–1	3–2
4	Iran	8	2	5	1	8	7	+1	11		1–1	2–1	1–2	—	1–0
5	United Arab Emirates	8	0	1	7	6	17	−11	1		0–2	1–2	1–2	1–1	—

== Fifth round ==
Teams finishing 3rd in the fourth round groups played each other to determine a possible 5th qualifier from Asia. The draw for the order in which the two matches would be played was held on 2 June 2009 during the FIFA Congress in Nassau, the Bahamas.

Team 1	Agg.	Team 2	1st leg	2nd leg
Bahrain	2–2 (a)	Saudi Arabia	0–0	2–2

Bahrain advanced to the Asia-Oceania play-off on the away goals rule.

== Inter-confederation play-offs ==
The Fifth Round winner then played the winner of the OFC qualifying group, New Zealand, in a home-and-away play-off. The winner of this play-off qualified for the 2010 FIFA World Cup finals.

The draw for the order in which the two matches would be played was held on 2 June 2009 during the FIFA Congress in Nassau, the Bahamas.

Team 1	Agg.	Team 2	1st leg	2nd leg
Bahrain	0–1	New Zealand	0–0	0–1

== Qualified teams ==
The following four teams from AFC qualified for the final tournament.

Team	Qualified as	Qualified on	Previous appearances in FIFA World Cup
Australia	Fourth round group A winners	6 June 2009	2 (1974, 2006)
South Korea	Fourth round group B winners	6 June 2009	7 (1954, 1986, 1990, 1994, 1998, 2002, 2006)
Japan	Fourth round group A runners-up	6 June 2009	3 (1998, 2002, 2006)
North Korea	Fourth round group B runners-up	17 June 2009	1 (1966)

^{1} Bold indicates champions for that year. Italic indicates hosts for that year.

== Top goalscorers ==
There were 374 goals scored in 143 matches, for an average of 2.62 goals per match.

8 goals

- (Thailand) Sarayoot Chaikamdee
- (Uzbekistan) Maksim Shatskikh

6 goals

- (Kuwait) Ahmad Ajab
- (United Arab Emirates) Ismail Matar

5 goals

- (Lebanon) Mohammed Ghaddar
- (Qatar) Sebastián Soria
- (South Korea) Park Ji-Sung
- (Syria) Zyad Chaabo

4 goals

- (Australia) Tim Cahill
- (Australia) Brett Emerton
- (Hong Kong) Cheng Siu Wai
- (Iran) Javad Nekounam
- (Iraq) Mahdi Karim
- (Jordan) Hassan Abdel Fattah
- (North Korea) Hong Yong-Jo
- (North Korea) Jong Chol-Min
- (Saudi Arabia) Abdoh Otaif
- (Singapore) Aleksandar Đurić
- (South Korea) Park Chu-Young
- (Syria) Jehad Al-Hussain
- (Syria) Raja Rafe
- (Tajikistan) Numondzhon Khakimov
- (Uzbekistan) Server Djeparov

Below are full goalscorer lists for each round:

- First round
- Second round
- Third round
- Fourth round
- Fifth round
