= Ahmed Faris Al-Binali =

Qatari footballer (born 1975)

Personal information
- Full name: Ahmed Faris Ali Al-Binali
- Date of birth: 27 August 1975 (age 51)
- Place of birth: Al Wakrah, Qatar
- Height: 1.70 m (5 ft 7 in)
- Position: Defender

Youth career
- 1992–1995: Al-Arabi

Senior career*
Years	Team	Apps	(Gls)
1995–2007	Al-Arabi	200	(16)
2007–2012	Al Gharrafa	76	(3)
Total		276	(19)

International career^{‡}
1998–2009	Qatar	45	(1)
- * Club domestic league appearances and goals as of 24 December 2009 ‡ National team caps and goals as of 24 December 2009

Ahmed Faris Al-Binali (Arabic: أحمد فارس البنعلي; born 27 August 1975) is a Qatari former footballer. He last played as a defender for Al Gharrafa. He was also a member of the Qatar national football team.

He retired on 12 May 2012 at the age of 36, making the announcement directly after winning the 2012 Emir Cup with Al Gharafa.
