= Mohammed Qasim Majid =

Iraqi footballer

Mohammed Qasim
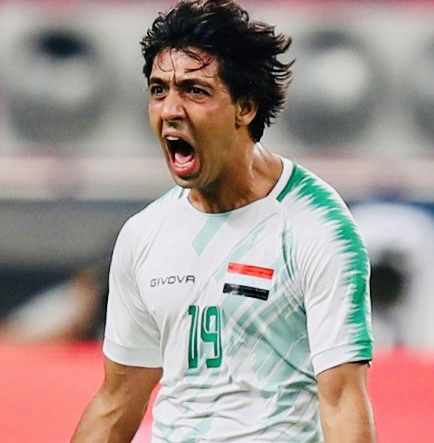
- Qasim with Iraq in 2019

Personal information
- Full name: Mohamed Qasim Majid Al-Shammari
- Date of birth: 6 December 1996 (age 29)
- Place of birth: Najaf, Iraq
- Height: 1.67 m (5 ft 6 in)
- Position: Midfielder

Team information
- Current team: Al-Zawraa
- Number: 10

Youth career
- 2012–2015: Naft Al-Wasat

Senior career*
Years	Team	Apps	(Gls)
2015–2018	Naft Al-Wasat		(5)
2018–2020	Al-Quwa Al-Jawiya		(5)
2020–2022	Al-Shorta	54	(9)
2022–2024	Al-Quwa Al-Jawiya		(5)
2024–2025	Al-Najaf		
2025–	Al-Zawraa		

International career^{‡}
2019–	Iraq	28	(3)
- * Club domestic league appearances and goals ‡ National team caps and goals as of 29 September 2026

Mohammed Qasim Majid Al-Shammari (Arabic: مُحَمَّد قَاسِم مَاجِد الشَّمَّرِيّ; born 6 December 1996) is an Iraqi professional footballer who plays as a midfielder for Iraq Stars League club Al-Zawraa and the Iraq national team.

== International career ==
On 7 June 2019, Qasim made his first international cap with Iraq against Tunisia in an international friendly. On 26 November 2019, he scored his first and second international goals against Qatar in a 2–1 win for Iraq in the 24th Arabian Gulf Cup.

=== International goals ===
Scores and results list Iraq's goal tally first.

No.	Date	Venue	Opponent	Score	Result	Competition
1.	26 November 2019	Khalifa International Stadium, Doha, Qatar	Qatar	1–0	2–1	24th Arabian Gulf Cup
2.	26 November 2019	Khalifa International Stadium, Doha, Qatar	Qatar	2–0	2–1	24th Arabian Gulf Cup
3.	23 September 2026	Prince Abdullah Al-Faisal Sports City Stadium, Jeddah, Saudi Arabia	Oman	1–0	1–1	27th Arabian Gulf Cup

== Style of play ==
Qasim is a left footer capable of playing as a number 10 or as a winger. He is known for quick & agile dribbling, accurate passing and for his capability of accurate and powerful long shots.

== Honours ==
=== Club ===
Al-Quwa Al-Jawiya

- Iraq FA Cup: 2022–23
- AFC Cup: 2018

Al-Shorta

- Iraqi Premier League: 2021–22

=== Individual ===
- Soccer Iraq Player of the Year: 2021
