= Abdulla Al-Haza'a =

Bahraini footballer

Personal information
- Full name: Abdulla Khaled Mohammed Ahmed Abdulla Al-Haza'a
- Date of birth: 19 July 1990 (age 36)
- Place of birth: Bahrain
- Height: 1.87 m (6 ft 2 in)
- Position: Defender

Team information
- Current team: Al-Khaldiya

Senior career*
Years	Team	Apps	(Gls)
2009–2012	East Riffa	72	(3)
2012–2013	→ Al-Hidd (loan)	42	(1)
2013–2022	East Riffa		
2021–2022	→ Al-Tadamon (loan)		
2022–	Al-Khaldiya		

International career^{‡}
2010	Bahrain U-23	3	(0)
2010–	Bahrain	44	(1)
- * Club domestic league appearances and goals as of 10:51, 23 November 2014 (UTC) ‡ National team caps and goals as of 17:37, 5 December 2019 (UTC)

Abdulla Al-Haza'a (Arabic: عبد الله الهزاع; born 19 July 1990) is a Bahraini professional footballer who plays as a defender.

== International goals ==
Scores and results list Bahrain's goal tally first.

No.	Date	Venue	Opponent	Score	Result	Competition
1.	5 December 2019	Abdullah bin Khalifa Stadium, Doha, Qatar	Iraq	1–1	2–2 (5–3 p)	24th Arabian Gulf Cup

== Honours ==
Bahrain

- Pan Arab Games: 2011
