= 24th Arabian Gulf Cup =

International football tournament in 2019

كأس الخليج العربي 24

Tournament details
- Host country: Qatar
- Dates: 26 November – 8 December
- Teams: 8 (from 1 confederation)
- Venues: 3 (in 3 host cities)

Final positions
- Champions: Bahrain (1st title)
- Runners-up: Saudi Arabia

Tournament statistics
- Matches played: 15
- Goals scored: 45 (3 per match)
- Top scorer: (United Arab Emirates) Ali Mabkhout (5 goals)
- Best player: (Saudi Arabia) Abdullah Otayf
- Best goalkeeper: (Saudi Arabia) Fawaz Al-Qarni
- Fair play award: Qatar

The 24th Arabian Gulf Cup was the 24th edition of the biennial football competition for the eight members of the Arab Gulf Cup Football Federation. Eight teams participated in the tournament.

On 15 July 2019, the AGCFF announced that the tournament would be held in Qatar from 24 November to 8 December 2019.

Bahrain won the competition by a 1–0 victory against Saudi Arabia to secure their first title.

== Venues ==
Al Rayyan (Doha Area)	Doha	Location of the host cities of the 24th Arabian Gulf Cup.
Khalifa International Stadium	Abdullah bin Khalifa Stadium	Location of the host cities of the 24th Arabian Gulf Cup.
Capacity: 45,857	Capacity: 12,000	Location of the host cities of the 24th Arabian Gulf Cup.
Al Wakrah		Location of the host cities of the 24th Arabian Gulf Cup.
Al Janoub Stadium		Location of the host cities of the 24th Arabian Gulf Cup.
Capacity: 44,325		Location of the host cities of the 24th Arabian Gulf Cup.

== Teams ==
On 12 November 2019, the national teams of Bahrain, Saudi Arabia and the United Arab Emirates decided to participate in the competition after boycotting it earlier.

Team	Appearance	Previous best performance	FIFA Rankings
Team	Appearance	Previous best performance	October 2019
Qatar (Host)	24th	Winners (1992, 2004, 2014)	57
United Arab Emirates	23rd	Winners (2007, 2013)	67
Saudi Arabia	23rd	Winners (1994, 2002, 2003–04)	69
Iraq	15th	Winners (1979, 1984, 1988)	74
Oman (Title Holders)	22nd	Winners (2009, 2017–18)	84
Bahrain	24th	Runners-up (1970, 1982, 1992, 2003–04)	101
Yemen	9th	Group stage (2003–04, 2004, 2007, 2009, 2010, 2013)	141
Kuwait	24th	Winners (1970, 1972, 1974, 1976, 1982, 1986, 1990, 1996, 1998, 2010)	156

== Officials ==
Referees

- Ammar Ebrahim Mahfoodh (Bahrain)
- Ali Abdulnabi Al Samaheeji (Bahrain)
- Alexandre Boucaut (Belgium)
- Ali Shaban (Kuwait)
- Ahmad Al-Ali (Kuwait)
- Abdullah Jamali (Kuwait)
- Mohanad Qasim Sarray (Iraq)
- Ali Sabah Adday Al Qaysi (Iraq)
- Ryuji Sato (Japan)
- Ahmed Al-Kaf (Oman)
- Omar Al Yaqoubi (Oman)
- Lionel Tschudi (Switzerland)
- (United Arab Emirates) Mohammed Abdulla Hassan Mohamed (United Arab Emirates)
- (United Arab Emirates) Ammar Al-Jeneibi (United Arab Emirates)
- Khamis Al Marri (Qatar)

Assistant Referees

- Yaser Tulefat (Bahrain)
- Salah Abdulaziz Janahi (Bahrain)
- Karel De Rocker (Belgium)
- Florian Lemaire (Belgium)
- Abbas Gholoum (Kuwait)
- Humoud Al-Sahli (Kuwait)
- Hayder Ubaydee (Iraq)
- Maytham Al Gburi (Iraq)
- Akane Yagi (Japan)
- Osamu Nonura (Japan)
- Abu Bakar Al Amri (Oman)
- Saif Al Ghafri (Oman)
- Jan Köbeli (Switzerland)
- (United Arab Emirates) Mohamed Ahmed Al Hammadi (United Arab Emirates)
- (United Arab Emirates) Hasan Mohamed Al Mahri (United Arab Emirates)
- Ramzan Saeed Al-Naemi (Qatar)
- Mohammad Dharman (Qatar)

== Group stage ==
All times are local (UTC+03:00).

=== Group A ===
Pos	Team	Pld	W	D	L	GF	GA	GD	Pts	Qualification
1	Iraq	3	2	1	0	4	1	+3	7	Advance to knockout stage
2	Qatar (H)	3	2	0	1	11	4	+7	6	Advance to knockout stage
3	United Arab Emirates	3	1	0	2	5	6	−1	3	
4	Yemen	3	0	1	2	0	9	−9	1	

Source: Soccerway
Rules for classification: Group stage tiebreakers
(H) Hosts
26 November 2019
19:30

Qatar	1–2	Iraq
Hatem 49'	Report	Qasim 19', 27'

Khalifa International Stadium, Al Rayyan
Attendance: 37,890
Referee: Lionel Tschudi (Switzerland)
26 November 2019
21:30

United Arab Emirates	3–0	Yemen
Mabkhout 21', 38', 54'	Report

Abdullah bin Khalifa Stadium, Doha
Attendance: 1,437
Referee: Ahmed Al-Kaf (Oman)

29 November 2019
17:30

United Arab Emirates	0–2	Iraq
	Report	Abbas 6'; Abdul-Zahra 37'

Khalifa International Stadium, Al Rayyan
Attendance: 17,437
Referee: Alexandre Boucaut (Belgium)
29 November 2019
20:00

Yemen	0–6	Qatar
	Report	Hassan 29', 36', 72' (pen.); Ali 57'; Al-Ahrak 85'; Afif 90'

Khalifa International Stadium, Al Rayyan
Attendance: 26,392
Referee: Ali Shaban (Kuwait)

2 December 2019
17:30

Qatar	4–2	United Arab Emirates
Afif 20', 28' (pen.); Al-Haydos 53'; Khoukhi 90+5'	Report	Mabkhout 33' (pen.), 77'

Khalifa International Stadium, Al Rayyan
Referee: Ryuji Sato (Japan)
2 December 2019
17:30

Yemen	0–0	Iraq
	Report

Abdullah bin Khalifa Stadium, Doha
Referee: Ahmad Al-Ali (Kuwait)

=== Group B ===
Pos	Team	Pld	W	D	L	GF	GA	GD	Pts	Qualification
1	Saudi Arabia	3	2	0	1	6	4	+2	6	Advance to knockout stage
2	Bahrain	3	1	1	1	4	4	0	4	Advance to knockout stage
3	Oman	3	1	1	1	3	4	−1	4	
4	Kuwait	3	1	0	2	6	7	−1	3	

Source: Soccerway
Rules for classification: Group stage tiebreakers
27 November 2019
17:30

Oman	0–0	Bahrain
	Report

Abdullah bin Khalifa Stadium, Doha
Attendance: 3,400
Referee: Alexandre Boucaut (Belgium)
27 November 2019
20:00

Saudi Arabia	1–3	Kuwait
Al-Buraikan 90+6'	Report	Al-Dhefiri 43'; Al-Sanea 45+1'; Al-Faneni 90'

Abdullah bin Khalifa Stadium, Doha
Attendance: 5,777
Referee: Mohammed Abdulla Hassan Mohamed (United Arab Emirates)

30 November 2019
17:30

Kuwait	1–2	Oman
Nasser 79'	Report	Al-Muqbali 16' (pen.), 32' (pen.)

Abdullah bin Khalifa Stadium, Doha
Referee: Khamis Al Marri (Qatar)
30 November 2019
20:00

Bahrain	0–2	Saudi Arabia
	Report	Al-Hamdan 29'; Al-Khabrani 58'

Abdullah bin Khalifa Stadium, Doha
Referee: Lionel Tschudi (Switzerland)

2 December 2019
20:00

Kuwait	2–4	Bahrain
Nasser 59' (pen.); Zanki 85'	Report	Madan 45+1'; Al-Shaikh 69'; Thiago Augusto 83', 90+3'

Khalifa International Stadium, Al Rayyan
Referee: Ammar Al-Jeneibi (United Arab Emirates)
2 December 2019
20:00

Oman	1–3	Saudi Arabia
Al-Alawi 55'	Report	Al-Buraikan 26'; Bahebri 42', 57'

Abdullah bin Khalifa Stadium, Doha
Referee: Alexandre Boucaut (Belgium)

== Knockout stage ==
- Times listed are UTC+03:00.
- In the knockout stage, extra time and a penalty shoot-out were used to decide the winner if necessary.

=== Bracket ===
Semi-finals
5 December – Doha
Iraq	2 (3)
Bahrain (p)	2 (5)
5 December – Al Wakrah
Saudi Arabia	1
Qatar	0

Final
8 December – Doha
Bahrain	1
Saudi Arabia	0

=== Semi-finals ===
5 December 2019
17:00

Iraq	2–2 (a.e.t.)	Bahrain
Ali 6'; Bayesh 18'	Report	Al-Haza'a 14'; Marhoon 45+2'
Penalties
Faez (penalty scored); Ismail (penalty scored); Bayesh (penalty scored); Qasim (penalty missed)	3–5	(penalty scored) Al-Hardan; (penalty scored) Al-Shaikh; (penalty scored) Marhoon; (penalty scored) Thiago Augusto; (penalty scored) Madan

Abdullah bin Khalifa Stadium, Doha
Referee: Ryuji Sato (Japan)

5 December 2019
20:00

Saudi Arabia	1–0	Qatar
Al-Hamdan 28'	Report

Al Janoub Stadium, Al Wakrah
Attendance: 42,025
Referee: Ahmad Al-Ali (Kuwait)

=== Final ===
8 December 2019
19:00

Bahrain	1–0	Saudi Arabia
Al-Romaihi 69'	Report

Abdullah bin Khalifa Stadium, Doha
Referee: Lionel Tschudi (Switzerland)

== Winner ==
24th Arabian Gulf Cup winners

Bahrain
1st title

== Goalscorers ==
There were 45 goals scored in 15 matches, for an average of 3 goals per match.

5 goals

- (United Arab Emirates) Ali Mabkhout

3 goals

- (Qatar) Abdelkarim Hassan
- (Qatar) Akram Afif

2 goals

- (Bahrain) Thiago Augusto
- (Oman) Abdul Aziz Al-Muqbali
- (Iraq) Mohammed Qasim
- (Kuwait) Yousef Nasser
- (Saudi Arabia) Firas Al-Buraikan
- (Saudi Arabia) Abdullah Al-Hamdan
- (Saudi Arabia) Hattan Bahebri

1 goal

- (Bahrain) Abdulla Al-Haza'a
- (Bahrain) Ali Madan
- (Bahrain) Jasim Al-Shaikh
- (Bahrain) Mohamed Al Romaihi
- (Bahrain) Mohamed Marhoon
- (Iraq) Alaa Abbas
- (Iraq) Alaa Abdul Zahra
- (Iraq) Ibrahim Bayesh
- (Iraq) Mohanad Ali
- (Kuwait) Ahmed Al-Dhefiri
- (Kuwait) Ahmed Zanki
- (Kuwait) Sami Al-Sanea
- (Kuwait) Mubarak Al-Faneni
- (Oman) Rabia Al-Alawi
- (Qatar) Abdulaziz Hatem
- (Qatar) Almoez Ali
- (Qatar) Abdullah Al-Ahrak
- (Qatar) Boualem Khoukhi
- (Qatar) Hassan Al-Haydos
- (Saudi Arabia) Mohammed Al-Khabrani

== Team statistics ==
This table shows all team performance.

Final phase
Pos	Team	Pld	W	D	L	GF	GA	GD	Pts
1	Bahrain	5	2	2	1	7	4	+3	8
2	Saudi Arabia	5	3	0	2	7	5	+2	9
3	Iraq	4	2	2	0	6	3	+3	8
4	Qatar	4	2	0	2	11	5	+6	6

Eliminated in the group stage
Pos	Team	Pld	W	D	L	GF	GA	GD	Pts
5	Oman	3	1	1	1	3	4	−1	4
6	Kuwait	3	1	0	2	6	7	−1	3
7	United Arab Emirates	3	1	0	2	5	6	−1	3
8	Yemen	3	0	1	2	0	9	−9	1

== Broadcasting rights ==
Below were the TV channels that broadcast the matches:

Territory	Television
MENA	Al Kass
MENA	BeIN Sports
Oman	Oman TV Sports
Kuwait	KTV Sports
