= Jasim Al-Shaikh =

Bahraini footballer (born 1996)

Personal information
- Full name: Jasim Ahmed Jasim Abdulla Al-Shaikh
- Date of birth: 1 February 1996 (age 30)
- Place of birth: Manama, Bahrain
- Height: 1.79 m (5 ft 10 in)
- Position: Forward

Team information
- Current team: Al-Riffa

Senior career*
Years	Team	Apps	(Gls)
2017–2020	Al-Ahli		
2020–	Al-Riffa		

International career
2011	Bahrain U16	4	(1)
2017–2019	Bahrain U23	3	(0)
2018–	Bahrain	56	(4)
Medal record
Men's football
Representing Bahrain
Gulf Cup
Winner	2024 Kuwait
- * Club domestic league appearances and goals as of 15:03, 5 January 2019 (UTC)

Jasim Ahmed Jasim Abdulla Al-Shaikh (Arabic: جَاسِم أَحْمَد جَاسِم عَبْد الله الشَّيْخ; born 1 February 1996) is a Bahraini footballer who plays as a forward for Al-Riffa and the Bahrain national team.

== International career ==
Al-Shaikh was included in Bahrain's squad for the 2019 AFC Asian Cup in the United Arab Emirates.

== Career statistics ==
=== International ===
As of 3 December 2019

Bahrain
Year	Apps	Goals
2018	6	0
2019	8	2
Total	14	2

Scores and results list Bahrain's goal tally first.

No.	Date	Venue	Opponent	Score	Result	Competition
1.	9 October 2019	Bahrain National Stadium, Riffa, Bahrain	Azerbaijan	2–2	2–3	Friendly
2.	3 December 2019	Khalifa International Stadium, Doha, Qatar	Kuwait	2–1	4–2	24th Arabian Gulf Cup
3.	3 June 2021	Bahrain National Stadium, Riffa, Bahrain	Cambodia	4–0	8–0	2022 FIFA World Cup qualification
4.	7 January 2023	Al-Minaa Olympic Stadium, Basra, Iraq	United Arab Emirates	1–0	2–1	25th Arabian Gulf Cup
