= 2010 FIFA World Cup qualification – AFC fourth round =

International football competition

The AFC fourth round of 2010 FIFA World Cup qualification was decided by a random draw conducted in Kuala Lumpur, Malaysia on 27 June 2008. The round commenced on 6 September 2008, and finished on 17 June 2009.

The top two countries in each group at the end of the stage qualified directly to the World Cup Finals in South Africa, with the two third-placed countries advancing to the AFC play-off.

== Format ==
The 10 teams (2 teams from each group in the third round) were divided into four pots for the draw, three containing two teams and one containing four. The seeding for the fourth round was based on that used in the third round draw, but Saudi Arabia and Japan (seeded equal 4th in that draw) were separated by a random selection held at the start of the fourth round draw. The pots were as follows:

Pot 1	Pot 2	Pot 3	Pot 4
Australia; South Korea	Iran; Japan	Saudi Arabia; Bahrain	Uzbekistan; North Korea; United Arab Emirates; Qatar

The 10 teams were split into two groups of five teams each – each containing one team from each of Pots 1, 2 and 3, as well as 2 teams from Pot 4.

The top two teams in each group qualified for the World Cup Finals, with the two third-placed sides advancing to a playoff. All teams played home and away against each of the other four teams in the group.

== Group A ==
Pos	Team	Pld	W	D	L	GF	GA	GD	Pts	Qualification	(Australia)	(Japan)	(Bahrain)	(Qatar)	(Uzbekistan)
1	Australia	8	6	2	0	12	1	+11	20	2010 FIFA World Cup	—	2–1	2–0	4–0	2–0
2	Japan	8	4	3	1	11	6	+5	15	2010 FIFA World Cup	0–0	—	1–0	1–1	1–1
3	Bahrain	8	3	1	4	6	8	−2	10	Fifth round	0–1	2–3	—	1–0	1–0
4	Qatar	8	1	3	4	5	14	−9	6		0–0	0–3	1–1	—	3–0
5	Uzbekistan	8	1	1	6	5	10	−5	4		0–1	0–1	0–1	4–0	—

6 September 2008
21:30 UTC+3

Bahrain	2–3	Japan
Isa 87'; Tulio 89' (o.g.)	Report	S. Nakamura 18'; Endō 44' (pen.); K. Nakamura 85'

Bahrain National Stadium, Madinat 'Isa
Attendance: 20,000
Referee: Abdul Malik Bashir (Singapore)
6 September 2008
22:00 UTC+3

Qatar	3–0	Uzbekistan
Siddiq 37'; Magid Mohamed 73'; Al-Bloushi 86'	Report

Jassim Bin Hamad Stadium, Doha
Attendance: 8,000
Referee: Subkhiddin Mohd Salleh (Malaysia)

10 September 2008
20:30 UTC+5

Uzbekistan	0–1	Australia
	Report	Chipperfield 26'

Pakhtakor Stadium, Tashkent
Attendance: 34,000
Referee: Saad Al Fadhli (Kuwait)
10 September 2008
22:00 UTC+3

Qatar	1–1	Bahrain
Soria 6'	Report	Fatadi 67'

Jassim Bin Hamad Stadium, Doha
Attendance: 7,000
Referee: Kim Dong-Jin (South Korea)

15 October 2008
20:00 UTC+10

Australia	4–0	Qatar
Cahill 8'; Emerton 17' (pen.), 58'; Kennedy 76'	Report

Suncorp Stadium, Brisbane
Attendance: 34,320
Referee: Khalil Al Ghamdi (Saudi Arabia)
15 October 2008
19:30 UTC+9

Japan	1–1	Uzbekistan
Tamada 40'	Report	Shatskikh 27'

Saitama Stadium, Saitama
Attendance: 55,142
Referee: Ali Hamad Al-Badwawi (UAE)

19 November 2008
18:00 UTC+3

Bahrain	0–1	Australia
	Report	Bresciano 90+3'

Bahrain National Stadium, Madinat 'Isa
Attendance: 10,000
Referee: Masoud Moradi (Iran)
19 November 2008
19:30 UTC+3

Qatar	0–3	Japan
	Report	Tanaka 19'; Tamada 47'; Tulio 68'

Jassim Bin Hamad Stadium, Doha
Attendance: 13,000
Referee: Sun Baojie (China PR)

11 February 2009
19:20 UTC+9

Japan	0–0	Australia
	Report

International Stadium, Yokohama
Attendance: 66,000
Referee: Muhsen Basma (Syria)
11 February 2009
16:00 UTC+5

Uzbekistan	0–1	Bahrain
	Report	Abdulrahman 90+4'

Pakhtakor Stadium, Tashkent
Attendance: 30,000
Referee: Subkhiddin Mohd Salleh (Malaysia)

28 March 2009
19:20 UTC+9

Japan	1–0	Bahrain
S. Nakamura 47'	Report

Saitama Stadium, Saitama
Attendance: 57,276
Referee: Kim Dong-Jin (Korea Republic)
28 March 2009
17:00 UTC+5

Uzbekistan	4–0	Qatar
Tadjiyev 34', 45+2', 53'; Soliev 62'	Report

Pakhtakor Stadium, Tashkent
Attendance: 18,000
Referee: Masoud Moradi (Iran)

1 April 2009
20:00 UTC+11

Australia	2–0	Uzbekistan
Kennedy 66'; Kewell 73' (pen.)	Report

Stadium Australia, Sydney
Attendance: 57,292
Referee: Ali Hamad Al-Badwawi (UAE)
1 April 2009
17:15 UTC+3

Bahrain	1–0	Qatar
Aaish 52'	Report

Bahrain National Stadium, Madinat 'Isa
Attendance: 20,000
Referee: Sun Baojie (China PR)

6 June 2009
19:00 UTC+5

Uzbekistan	0–1	Japan
	Report	Okazaki 9'

Pakhtakor Stadium, Tashkent
Attendance: 34,000
Referee: Muhsen Basma (Syria)
6 June 2009
19:00 UTC+3

Qatar	0–0	Australia
	Report

Jassim Bin Hamad Stadium, Doha
Attendance: 7,000
Referee: Abdul Malik Bashir (Singapore)

10 June 2009
20:00 UTC+10

Australia	2–0	Bahrain
Sterjovski 55'; Carney 88'	Report

Stadium Australia, Sydney
Attendance: 39,540
Referee: Abdullah Al Hilali (Oman)
10 June 2009
19:20 UTC+9

Japan	1–1	Qatar
Al-Binali 3' (o.g.)	Report	Ali Afif 53' (pen.)

International Stadium Yokohama, Yokohama
Attendance: 60,256
Referee: Subkhiddin Mohd Salleh (Malaysia)

17 June 2009
20:20 UTC+10

Australia	2–1	Japan
Cahill 59', 77'	Report	Tulio 39'

Melbourne Cricket Ground, Melbourne
Attendance: 74,100
Referee: Khalil Al Ghamdi (Saudi Arabia)
17 June 2009
19:30 UTC+3

Bahrain	1–0	Uzbekistan
Abdulrahman 73'	Report

Bahrain National Stadium, Madinat 'Isa
Attendance: 14,100
Referee: Masoud Moradi (Iran)

== Group B ==
Pos	Team	Pld	W	D	L	GF	GA	GD	Pts	Qualification	(South Korea)	(North Korea)	(Saudi Arabia)	(Iran)	(United Arab Emirates)
1	South Korea	8	4	4	0	12	4	+8	16	2010 FIFA World Cup	—	1–0	0–0	1–1	4–1
2	North Korea	8	3	3	2	7	5	+2	12	2010 FIFA World Cup	1–1	—	1–0	0–0	2–0
3	Saudi Arabia	8	3	3	2	8	8	0	12	Fifth round	0–2	0–0	—	1–1	3–2
4	Iran	8	2	5	1	8	7	+1	11		1–1	2–1	1–2	—	1–0
5	United Arab Emirates	8	0	1	7	6	17	−11	1		0–2	1–2	1–2	1–1	—

6 September 2008
22:15 UTC+4

United Arab Emirates	1–2	North Korea
Saeed 86'	Report	Choe Kum-Chol 72'; An Chol-Hyok 81'

Al Jazira Mohammed Bin Zayed Stadium, Abu Dhabi
Attendance: 10,000
Referee: Ravshan Irmatov (Uzbekistan)
6 September 2008
22:15 UTC+3

Saudi Arabia	1–1	Iran
Al-Harthi 29'	Report	Nekounam 81'

King Fahd International Stadium, Riyadh
Attendance: 50,000
Referee: Mark Shield (Australia)

10 September 2008
20:00 UTC+8

North Korea	1–1	South Korea
Hong Yong-Jo 64' (pen.)	Report	Ki Sung-yueng 69'

Hongkou Stadium, Shanghai (China)
Attendance: 3,000
Referee: Muhsen Basma (Syria)
10 September 2008
22:15 UTC+4

United Arab Emirates	1–2	Saudi Arabia
Khater 23'	Report	Otaif 69'; Al-Fraidi 73'

Al Jazira Mohammed Bin Zayed Stadium, Abu Dhabi
Attendance: 15,000
Referee: Yuichi Nishimura (Japan)

15 October 2008
20:00 UTC+9

South Korea	4–1	United Arab Emirates
Lee Keun-ho 20', 80'; Park Ji-sung 26'; Kwak Tae-hwi 89'	Report	Al Hammadi 72'

Seoul World Cup Stadium, Seoul
Attendance: 30,000
Referee: Matthew Breeze (Australia)
15 October 2008
17:00 UTC+3:30

Iran	2–1	North Korea
Mahdavikia 9'; Nekounam 63'	Report	Jong Tae-Se 72'

Azadi Stadium, Tehran
Attendance: 60,000
Referee: Abdullah Al Hilali (Oman)

19 November 2008
19:15 UTC+4

United Arab Emirates	1–1	Iran
Juma'a 19'	Report	Bagheri 81'

Al-Maktoum Stadium, Dubai
Attendance: 8,000
Referee: Subkhiddin Mohd Salleh (Malaysia)
19 November 2008
19:35 UTC+3

Saudi Arabia	0–2	South Korea
	Report	Lee Keun-ho 76'; Park Chu-young 90+2'

King Fahd International Stadium, Riyadh
Attendance: 60,000
Referee: Abdul Malik Bashir (Singapore)

11 February 2009
15:00 UTC+9

North Korea	1–0	Saudi Arabia
Mun In-Guk 28'	Report

Kim Il-Sung Stadium, Pyongyang
Attendance: 48,000
Referee: Ravshan Irmatov (Uzbekistan)
11 February 2009
15:00 UTC+3:30

Iran	1–1	South Korea
Nekounam 58'	Report	Park Ji-sung 81'

Azadi Stadium, Tehran
Attendance: 75,000
Referee: Ben Williams (Australia)

28 March 2009
15:30 UTC+9

North Korea	2–0	United Arab Emirates
Pak Nam-Chol 51'; Mun In-Guk 90+3'	Report

Kim Il-Sung Stadium, Pyongyang
Attendance: 50,000
Referee: Matthew Breeze (Australia)
28 March 2009
19:00 UTC+4:30

Iran	1–2	Saudi Arabia
Shojaei 57'	Report	Hazazi 79'; Al-Muwallad 87'

Azadi Stadium, Tehran
Attendance: 100,000
Referee: Yuichi Nishimura (Japan)

1 April 2009
20:00 UTC+9

South Korea	1–0	North Korea
Kim Chi-woo 86'	Report

Seoul World Cup Stadium, Seoul
Attendance: 48,000
Referee: Abdullah Al Hilali (Oman)
1 April 2009
20:30 UTC+3

Saudi Arabia	3–2	United Arab Emirates
Otaif 4' (pen.); Juma 70' (o.g.); Hazazi 85'	Report	Al Shehhi 38'; Matar 45+1'

King Fahd International Stadium, Riyadh
Attendance: 70,000
Referee: Subkhiddin Mohd Salleh (Malaysia)

6 June 2009
17:00 UTC+9

North Korea	0–0	Iran
	Report

Yanggakdo Stadium, Pyongyang
Attendance: 30,000
Referee: Sun Baojie (China PR)
6 June 2009
20:15 UTC+4

United Arab Emirates	0–2	South Korea
	Report	Park Chu-young 9'; Ki Sung-yueng 37'

Al-Maktoum Stadium, Dubai
Attendance: 4,000
Referee: Abdullah Balideh (Qatar)

10 June 2009
20:00 UTC+9

South Korea	0–0	Saudi Arabia
	Report

Seoul World Cup Stadium, Seoul
Attendance: 32,510
Referee: Ben Williams (Australia)
10 June 2009
19:00 UTC+4:30

Iran	1–0	United Arab Emirates
Karimi 53'	Report

Azadi Stadium, Tehran
Attendance: 38,000
Referee: Ravshan Irmatov (Uzbekistan)

17 June 2009
20:00 UTC+9

South Korea	1–1	Iran
Park Ji-sung 82'	Report	Shojaei 52'

Seoul World Cup Stadium, Seoul
Attendance: 40,000
Referee: Yuichi Nishimura (Japan)
17 June 2009
21:00 UTC+3

Saudi Arabia	0–0	North Korea
	Report

King Fahd International Stadium, Riyadh
Attendance: 65,000
Referee: Muhsen Basma (Syria)

== Goalscorers ==
There were 80 goals scored in 40 matches, for an average of 2 goals per match.

3 goals

- (Australia) Tim Cahill
- (Iran) Javad Nekounam
- (South Korea) Lee Keun-ho
- (South Korea) Park Ji-sung
- (Uzbekistan) Farhod Tadjiyev

2 goals

- (Australia) Brett Emerton
- (Australia) Joshua Kennedy
- (Bahrain) Mahmood Abdulrahman
- (Iran) Masoud Shojaei
- (Japan) Shunsuke Nakamura
- (Japan) Keiji Tamada
- (Japan) Marcus Tulio Tanaka
- (North Korea) Mun In-Guk
- (Saudi Arabia) Naif Hazazi
- (Saudi Arabia) Abdoh Otaif
- (South Korea) Ki Sung-yueng
- (South Korea) Park Chu-young

1 goal

- (Australia) Mark Bresciano
- (Australia) David Carney
- (Australia) Scott Chipperfield
- (Australia) Harry Kewell
- (Australia) Mile Sterjovski
- (Bahrain) Faouzi Mubarak Aaish
- (Bahrain) Abdulla Baba Fatadi
- (Bahrain) Salman Isa
- (Iran) Karim Bagheri
- (Iran) Ali Karimi
- (Iran) Mehdi Mahdavikia
- (Japan) Yasuhito Endō
- (Japan) Kengo Nakamura
- (Japan) Shinji Okazaki
- (Japan) Tatsuya Tanaka
- (North Korea) An Chol-Hyok
- (North Korea) Choe Kum-Chol
- (North Korea) Hong Yong-Jo
- (North Korea) Jong Tae-Se
- (North Korea) Pak Nam-Chol
- (Qatar) Ali Afif
- (Qatar) Talal Al-Bloushi
- (Qatar) Magid Mohamed
- (Qatar) Majdi Siddiq
- (Qatar) Sebastián Soria
- (Saudi Arabia) Ahmed Al-Fraidi
- (Saudi Arabia) Saad Al-Harthi
- (Saudi Arabia) Osama Al-Muwallad
- (South Korea) Kim Chi-woo
- (South Korea) Kwak Tae-hwi
- (United Arab Emirates) Ismail Al Hammadi
- (United Arab Emirates) Mohammed Al Shehhi
- (United Arab Emirates) Abdulrahim Jumaa
- (United Arab Emirates) Subait Khater
- (United Arab Emirates) Ismail Matar
- (United Arab Emirates) Bashir Saeed
- (Uzbekistan) Maksim Shatskikh
- (Uzbekistan) Anvarjon Soliev

1 own goal

- (Japan) Marcus Tulio Tanaka (against Bahrain)
- (Qatar) Ahmed Faris Al-Binali (against Japan)
- (United Arab Emirates) Fares Juma (against Saudi Arabia)

== Notes ==
Several Iranian players started their away match against South Korea wearing green armbands or wristbands, a symbol of protest at the outcome of the Iranian presidential election. Most removed them at half-time. The newspaper Iran reported that Ali Karimi, Mehdi Mahdavikia, Hosein Kaebi, and Vahid Hashemian had received life bans from the Iranian FA for the gesture. However, the Iranian FA denied this claim in a response to FIFA's inquiry saying that "the comments in foreign media are nothing but lies and a mischievous act." The Iran national team head coach Afshin Ghotbi also confirmed that it was a rumour and Iranian FA "has not taken any official stand on this issue."
