= 2010 FIFA World Cup qualification – AFC fifth round =

International football competition

The AFC fifth round of 2010 FIFA World Cup qualification was held on 5 and 9 September 2009 between the two teams that finished third in the fourth round, Bahrain and Saudi Arabia. The order for the matches was decided by a random draw held on 2 June 2009 during the FIFA Congress in Nassau, the Bahamas.

Bahrain won the tie on away goals and advanced to a play-off against the winner of the OFC qualifying group, New Zealand, for a place in the 2010 FIFA World Cup finals.

== Summary ==
The winner switched twice during the stoppage time in the second leg: before the stoppage time, the score was tied at 1–1 and therefore Bahrain had an advantage under the away goals rule. In the first minute of stoppage time, Saudi Arabia pulled the advantage to themselves by Hamad Al-Montashari. However, this was reversed again by Bahraini Ismael Abdullatif in the third minute of stoppage time and Bahrain progressed on the away goals rule.

== Matches ==
Team 1	Agg.	Team 2	1st leg	2nd leg
Bahrain	2–2 (a)	Saudi Arabia	0–0	2–2

5 September 2009
22:00 UTC+3

Bahrain	0–0	Saudi Arabia
	Report

Bahrain National Stadium, Riffa
Attendance: 16,000
Referee: Yuichi Nishimura (Japan)
9 September 2009
22:15 UTC+3

Saudi Arabia	2–2	Bahrain
Al-Shamrani 13'; Al-Montashari 90+1'	Report	Okwunwanne 42'; Abdullatif 90+4'

King Fahd International Stadium, Riyadh
Attendance: 50,000
Referee: Ravshan Irmatov (Uzbekistan)

2–2 on aggregate; Bahrain advanced on the away goals rule.

== Goalscorers ==
There were 4 goals scored in 2 matches, for an average of 2 goals per match.

1 goal

- (Bahrain) Ismail Abdullatif
- (Bahrain) Jaycee John Okwunwanne
- (Saudi Arabia) Hamad Al-Montashari
- (Saudi Arabia) Nasser Al-Shamrani
