= 2023 Malaysia FA Cup final =

Association football championship match

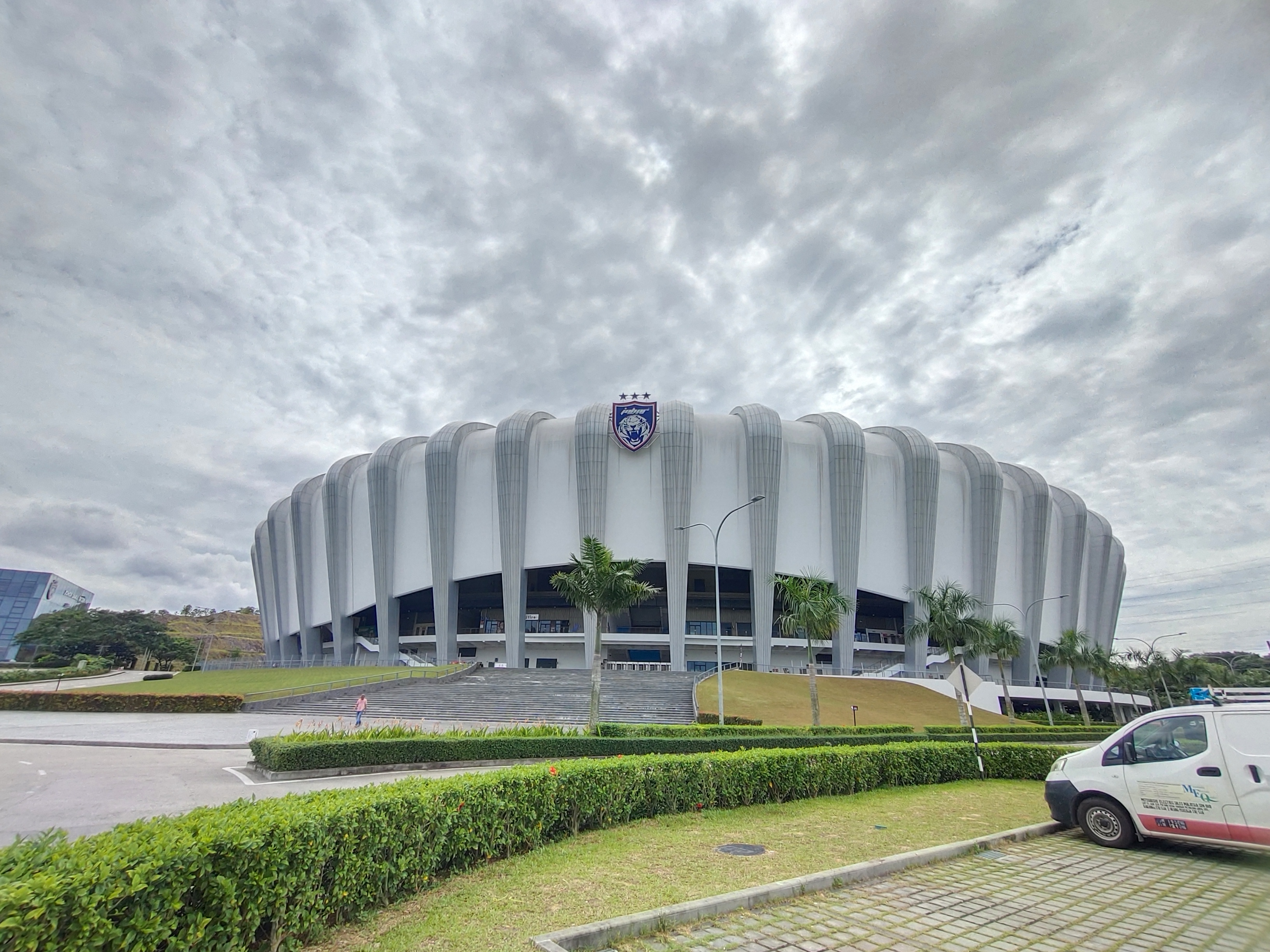
- The match took place at Sultan Ibrahim Stadium.
- Event: 2023 Malaysia FA Cup
| Johor Darul Ta'zim | Kuala Lumpur City |
| 2 | 0 |
- Date: 22 July 2023
- Venue: Sultan Ibrahim Stadium, Iskandar Puteri
- Man of the Match: Hong Wan (Johor Darul Ta'zim)
- Referee: Nazmi Nasaruddin
- Attendance: 33,598
- Weather: Good; 28 °C (82 °F)

The 2023 Malaysia FA Cup final was an association football match played between Johor Darul Ta'zim and Kuala Lumpur City at Sultan Ibrahim Stadium, Iskandar Puteri, Johor on 22 July 2023. It will be the 34th FA Cup final. It was Kuala Lumpur City's first FA Cup final since 1999, and JDT's second successive FA Cup final.

Nazmi Nasaruddin, from Penang, was the referee for the match, which was played in front of 33,598 spectators. After a goalless first half, Hong Wan scored midway through the second half with a strike from distance which flew into the top-left corner of Kuala Lumpur City's goal past Kevin Ray Mendoza. They extended their lead in the 74th minute when midfielder Leandro Velázquez scored. The match ended 2–0 to Johor Darul Ta'zim who won the FA Cup for the third time.

As winners, Johor Darul Ta'zim will enter the group stage of the 2024–25 AFC Champions League Two. However, as Johor Darul Ta'zim had already qualified for the group stage of the 2024–25 AFC Champions League as the 2023 Malaysia Super League champions, the berth reserved was given to the second-placed team of the Super League.

== Background ==
The Malaysian Football League (MFL) has confirmed Sultan Ibrahim Stadium in Iskandar Puteri, Johor has been officially picked as the venue for the 2023 Malaysia FA Cup Final, scheduled to take place on 22 July 2023. The MFL previously determined that the venue selection for the 2023 FA Cup Final will be made through an open bid to all 2023 Malaysia League clubs, starting on 19 May 2023. The selection was made after confirming that the Bukit Jalil National Stadium cannot be used due to still in the process of improvement and renovation.

In the bid period that was opened on 19 May 2023 to 24 May 2023, only Johor Darul Ta'zim (JDT) submitted an application where no bid was received by the MFL from other clubs or applied for an extension of the bid period. Following no bids received from any club other than JDT, the MFL confirmed that Sultan Ibrahim Stadium has been chosen as the venue for the 2023 Malaysia FA Cup Final. However, any changes regarding the venue selection are subject to the decision of the MFL Board of Directors.

== Route to the final ==
| Johor Darul Ta'zim | | Round | Kuala Lumpur City | |
| Opposition | Score | Round | Opposition | Score |
|---|---|---|---|---|
| PDRM (H) | 3–0 | 2nd | Immigration (H) | 2–0 |
| Penang (H) | 5–0 | QF | Sabah (A) | 2–1 |
| Selangor (H) | 4–0 | SF | Terengganu (A) | 0–0 (a.e.t.) (4–2 p) |
Key: (H) = Home venue; (A) = Away venue

=== Johor Darul Ta'zim ===
As a Super League club, Johor Darul Ta'zim (JDT) started in the second round where they were drawn against Super League team PDRM at the Sultan Ibrahim Stadium. JDT dominated their opponents and won 3–0, with all three penalty goals scored by Bergson; two goals and a lone goal from Leandro Velázquez. In the quarter-finals, JDT faced Penang, another Super League team, at home. Jordi Amat and own goal opponent by Ousmane Fané gave JDT a two-goals lead in first-half before second-half goals from Arif Aiman, La'Vere Corbin-Ong and Syafiq Ahmad gave the home side a 5–0 victory. In the semi-final, JDT took on their rivals Selangor at home. Arif Aiman score a hat-trick to gave JDT half-time lead, before strikes from Fernando Forestieri secured a 4–0 win for JDT and qualification for the final.

=== Kuala Lumpur City ===
As a Super League team, Kuala Lumpur City entered the competition in the second round where they played at home at Kuala Lumpur Stadium against M3 League side Immigration. T. Saravanan opened the scoring for Kuala Lumpur City before end of the first half, before Romel Morales doubled the lead in the 83rd-minute to secure a 2–0 victory. Kuala Lumpur City played fellow Super League side Sabah at away in the quarter-final. Gabriel Peres put the home side ahead with a penalty goal to give them a 1–0 lead. After 30-minutes played, Romel Morales scored from a Zhafri Yahya assist to level the score. T. Saravanan then scored from a rebound after Sabah's defender Rizal Ghazali failed to hold on Saravanan's movement, to give Kuala Lumpur City a 2–1 win. In the semi-finals, they visited the Sultan Mizan Zainal Abidin Stadium to face another fellow Super League opponents Terengganu, where the match end with a goalless draw and took the game to extra time. With no further goals, the match went to a penalty shootout that Kuala Lumpur City won 4–2 after their goalkeeper Azim Al-Amin saved Nik Sharif and Liridon Krasniqi's spot kick. That win to ensure Kuala Lumpur City's progression to the final.

== Match ==
=== Details ===
Team List and Official

22 July 2023
21:00 MYT

| Johor Darul Ta'zim | 2–0 | Kuala Lumpur City |
|---|---|---|
| Hong Wan 66'; Velázquez 74' | Report |

Sultan Ibrahim Stadium, Iskandar Puteri
Attendance: 33,598
Referee: Nazmi Nasaruddin

| Johor Darul Ta'zim | Kuala Lumpur City |

| GK | 33 | (Malaysia) Syihan Hazmi |
| RB | 2 | (Malaysia) Matthew Davies |
| CB | 5 | (Indonesia) Jordi Amat (c) | (yellow card) 79' |
| CB | 15 | (Malaysia) Feroz Baharudin | (yellow card) 15' | (substituted off) 84' |
| LB | 22 | (Malaysia) Corbin-Ong | (substituted off) 90' |
| CM | 4 | (Malaysia) Afiq Fazail | (substituted off) 80' |
| CM | 6 | (England) Hong Wan |
| CM | 10 | (Argentina) Leandro Velázquez | (yellow card) 75' | (substituted off) 84' |
| RF | 42 | (Malaysia) Arif Aiman | (substituted off) 90' |
| CF | 9 | (Brazil) Bergson |
| LF | 45 | (Italy) Fernando Forestieri |
Substitutes:
| GK | 26 | (Malaysia) Farizal Marlias |
| DF | 32 | (Malaysia) Shahrul Saad | | (substituted on) 84' |
| DF | 91 | (Malaysia) Syahmi Safari |
| MF | 19 | (Malaysia) Akhyar Rashid | | (substituted on) 90' |
| MF | 20 | (Spain) Juan Muñiz | | (substituted on) 84' |
| MF | 23 | (Malaysia) Endrick |
| MF | 24 | (Spain) Óscar Arribas | | (substituted on) 90' |
| MF | 77 | (Malaysia) Syamer Kutty Abba | | (substituted on) 80' |
| FW | 28 | (Malaysia) Syafiq Ahmad |
Coach:
(Argentina) Esteban Solari

| GK | 1 | (Philippines) Kevin Ray Mendoza |
| RB | 12 | (Malaysia) Declan Lambert | (substituted off) 67' |
| CB | 5 | (Croatia) Matko Zirdum |
| CB | 9 | (Australia) Giancarlo Gallifuoco |
| LB | 4 | (Malaysia) Kamal Azizi |
| CM | 6 | (Malaysia) Ryan Lambert |
| CM | 19 | (Italy) Sebastian Avanzini | (yellow card) 25' |
| RW | 8 | (Malaysia) Zhafri Yahya | (yellow card) 14' | (substituted off) 77' |
| AM | 28 | (Malaysia) Paulo Josué (c) |
| LW | 26 | (Malaysia) T. Saravanan | (substituted off) 62' |
| CF | 7 | (Colombia) Romel Morales | (substituted off) 77' |
Substitutes:
| GK | 20 | (Malaysia) Azim Al-Amin |
| DF | 25 | (Malaysia) Anwar Ibrahim | | (substituted on) 67' |
| DF | 77 | (Malaysia) Nazirul Naim |
| MF | 14 | (Malaysia) Akram Mahinan | | (substituted on) 62' |
| MF | 21 | (Malaysia) Kenny Pallraj |
| FW | 16 | (Malaysia) J. Partiban |
| FW | 17 | (Malaysia) Sean Giannelli |
| FW | 23 | (Ivory Coast) Kipré Tchétché | | (substituted on) 77' |
| FW | 37 | (Malaysia) Haqimi Azim | | (substituted on) 77' |
Coach:
(Croatia) Bojan Hodak

Man of the Match:
Hong Wan (Johor Darul Ta'zim)

Assistant referees:
Zairul Khalil Tan
Shafiq Ahmad Said
Fourth official:
Junaidy Abd Samad
Reserve assistant referee:
S. Logeswaran
Fitri Maskon

Match rules

- 90 minutes
- 30 minutes of extra time if necessary
- Penalty shoot-out if scores still level
- Nine named substitutes
- Maximum of five substitutions, with a sixth allowed in extra time (Note: Each team was given only three opportunities to make substitutions, with a fourth opportunity in extra time, excluding substitutions made at half-time, before the start of extra time and at half-time in extra time.)

== See also ==
- 2023 Malaysia Cup
