= 2024–25 Kuala Lumpur City F.C. season =

Kuala Lumpur City
2024–25 season
- President: Syed Yazid Syed Omar
- CEO: Stanley Bernard
- Manager: Miroslav Kuljanac
- Stadium: Kuala Lumpur Stadium
- Malaysia Super League: 6th
- Malaysia FA Cup: Round of 16
- Malaysia Cup: Quarter-finals
- Top goalscorer: League: Paulo Josué (17); All: Paulo Josué (20)
Home colours	Away colours

The 2024–25 season was Kuala Lumpur City F.C.'s 46th season in club history and 4th season in the Malaysia Super League after rebranding their name from Kuala Lumpur United and promotion in 2021.

== Current squad ==
=== Senior team ===
As of 2025

Note: Flags indicate national team as defined under FIFA eligibility rules; some limited exceptions apply. Players may hold more than one non-FIFA nationality.

No.	Pos.	Nation	Player
1	GK	NZL	Lawton Green
4	DF	MAS	Kamal Azizi
5	DF	MNE	Adrijan Rudović
6	DF	MAS	Ryan Lambert (on loan from Johor Darul Ta'zim)
7	MF	BIH	Jovan Motika
8	MF	MAS	Zhafri Yahya
9	DF	MAS	Giancarlo Gallifuoco
12	DF	MAS	Declan Lambert (on loan from Johor Darul Ta'zim)
16	DF	MAS	Partiban Janasekaran
17	FW	MAS	Sean Giannelli
18	MF	MAS	Mahalli Jasuli
20	MF	MAS	Amirul Aiman
21	MF	MAS	Kenny Pallraj

No.	Pos.	Nation	Player
22	GK	MAS	Hafizul Hakim
23	DF	MAS	Nicholas Swirad
25	DF	MAS	Anwar Ibrahim
28	MF	MAS	Paulo Josué (captain)
29	MF	MAS	Arif Shaqirin
30	GK	MAS	Azri Ghani
33	DF	MAS	Juzaerul Jasmi
34	DF	MAS	Khairul Naim
37	FW	MAS	Haqimi Azim
42	FW	MAS	Suhaimi Abu
66	DF	MAS	Nabil Hakim
70	MF	MAS	Hadi Mizei
77	MF	MAS	Sharvin Selvakumaran
88	MF	MAS	Brendan Gan
—	MF	SRB	Luka Milunović

== Management and coaching staff ==
Position	Staff
Head coach	(Croatia) Miroslav Kuljanac
Assistant head coach	(Malaysia)
Assistant coach	(Egypt) Ahmed Elwardani
Goalkeeper coach	(Brazil) Guilherme Azevedo
Fitness coach	(Malaysia) Mohd Azizan Ghazali
Physiotherapist	(Malaysia) Renesh Prabaharan
Team admin	(Malaysia) Al-Naliq Hasmi Abu Hassan
Media officer	(Malaysia) Ahmad Shznazri Ahmad Hishamnuri
Masseurs	(Malaysia) Hamzah Zakaria
Masseurs	(Malaysia) Iqbal Afiq Azmi
Kit managers	(Malaysia) Muhammad Syafiq Danish
Kit managers	(Malaysia) Muhammad Syahmi Syazwan

== Transfers and contracts ==
=== In ===
Preseason

Position	Player	Transferred from	Ref
GK	(New Zealand) Lawton Green	(Scotland) Greenock Morton	Free
GK	(Malaysia) Hafizul Hakim	(Malaysia) Harini F.T.	Free
GK	(Malaysia) Azim Al-Amin	(Malaysia) Selangor	Free
DF	(Montenegro) Adrijan Rudović	(Malaysia) FK Sutjeska Nikšić	Free
DF	(Malaysia) (England) Nicholas Swirad	(Malaysia) Sri Pahang	Free
DF	(Malaysia) Mahalli Jasuli	(Malaysia) Negeri Sembilan	Free
MF	(Malaysia) Zahril Azri	(Malaysia) Selangor	Free
MF	(Malaysia) (Australia) Brendan Gan	(Malaysia) Selangor	Free
FW	(Malaysia) Arif Shaqirin	(Malaysia) Perak	Free
FW	(Bosnia and Herzegovina) Jovan Motika	(Croatia) NK Bjelovar	Free
FW	(Serbia) Lazar Sajčić	(Slovenia) ND Gorica	Free

=== Loan In / Return ===
Preseason

Position	Player	Transferred from	Ref
DF	(Malaysia) (England) Declan Lambert	(Malaysia) Johor Darul Ta'zim	Season loan till May 2025
MF	(Malaysia) (England) Ryan Lambert	(Malaysia) Johor Darul Ta'zim	Season loan till May 2025
FW	(Malaysia) J.Partiban	(Malaysia) Kedah Darul Aman	End of loan

=== Out ===
Preseason

Position	Player	Transferred To	Ref
DF	(Malaysia) Nazirul Naim	(Malaysia)	Free
DF	(Malaysia) Muhammad Faudzi	(Malaysia) Kelantan Darul Naim	Free
DF	(Croatia) Matko Zirdum		Free
DF	(Malaysia) (England) Declan Lambert	(Malaysia) Johor Darul Ta'zim	Free (Note: Declan Lambert returns to Kuala Lumpur City on loan for one season.)
MF	(Malaysia) (England) Ryan Lambert	(Malaysia) Johor Darul Ta'zim	Free (Note: Ryan Lambert returns to Kuala Lumpur City on loan for one season.)
MF	(Italy) (Denmark) Sebastian Avanzini	(Malaysia) Negeri Sembilan	Free
FW	(Malaysia) (Colombia) Romel Morales	(Malaysia) Johor Darul Ta'zim	Free
MF	(Malaysia) Akram Mahinan	(Malaysia) Terengganu	Free
FW	(Malaysia) T. Saravanan	(Malaysia) Sri Pahang	Free
FW	(Ivory Coast) Kipré Tchétché	(Malaysia) Kuching City	Free

Mid-season

Position	Player	Transferred To	Ref
FW	(Serbia) Lazar Sajčić	(Serbia) FK Zemun	Free

=== Loan Out / Return ===
Preseason

Position	Player	Transferred To	Ref
MF	(Malaysia) Firdaus Saiyadi	(Malaysia) Perak	End of loan

== Friendly matches ==
Win Draw Loss

== Competitions ==
=== Overview ===
Competition	First match	Last match	Starting round	Final position	Record							
Competition	First match	Last match	Starting round	Final position	Pld	W	D	L	GF	GA	GD	Win %
Malaysia Super League	12 May 2024	20 April 2025	Matchday 1	6th	24	11	4	9	40	33	+7	45.83
Malaysia FA Cup	14 June 2024		Round of 16	Round of 16	1	0	0	1	2	3	−1	0.00
Malaysia Cup	22 November 2024	21 December 2024	Round of 16	Quarter-finals	4	1	0	3	7	10	−3	25.00
ASEAN Club Championship	22 August 2024	6 February 2025	Group stage	Group stage	5	2	0	3	4	6	−2	40.00
Total					34	14	4	16	53	52	+1	41.18

Last updated: 20 April 2025
Source: Competitions

=== Malaysia Super League ===
Win Draw Loss

12 May 2024 1	Kuala Lumpur City	1–1	Kuching City	Kuala Lumpur
	Paulo Josué 12'; Kipré Tchétché (yellow card) 62'; Arif Fadzilah (yellow card) 64'	Report	Pedro Henrique 19'	Stadium: Kuala Lumpur Stadium; Attendance: 659; Referee: S. Logeswaran

25 May 2024 2	Kuala Lumpur City	1–5	Johor Darul Ta'zim	Kuala Lumpur
17:30 MYT	Paulo Josué 48' (pen.); Kenny Pallraj (yellow card) 58'; Zhafri Yahya (yellow card) 64'; Giancarlo Gallifuoco (yellow card) 77'	Report	Hong Wan (yellow card) 27'; Francisco Geraldes (yellow card) 29'; Fernando Forestieri 43', 61'; Juan Muñiz 45+5', 71'; Óscar Arribas (yellow card) 45+7'; Natxo Insa (yellow card) 86'; Syahmi Safari 88'	Stadium: Kuala Lumpur Stadium; Attendance: 4,750; Referee: Muhammad Nazmi Bin Nasaruddin

21 June 2024 3	Negeri Sembilan	0–3	Kuala Lumpur City	Negeri Sembilan
	Jacque Faye (red card) 55'	Report	Brendan Gan 28'; Paulo Josué 72'; Sharvin Selvakumaran 90+2'	Stadium: Tuanku Abdul Rahman Stadium; Attendance: 1,750; Referee: S. Logeswaran

14 July 2024 4	Kuala Lumpur City	1–0	Selangor	Kuala Lumpur
20:15 UTC+08:00	Motika 63'; Gallifuoco (yellow card) 8'; Zhafri (yellow card) 50'; Pallraj (yellow card) 71'; Lambert (yellow card) 77'; Anwar (yellow card) 90'	Report	Harith (yellow card) 45+5'; Zikri (yellow card) 72'; Aliff (yellow card) 90+1'	Stadium: Kuala Lumpur Stadium; Attendance: 4,248; Referee: Usaid Jamal

27 July 2024 5	Kuala Lumpur City	0–0	Sri Pahang	Kuala Lumpur
		Report	Adam Nor Azlin (yellow card) 26'; Ashar Al Aafiz (yellow card) 45+1'; Manuel Hidalgo (yellow card) 86'	Stadium: Kuala Lumpur Stadium; Attendance: 1,149; Referee: Faizudin Ismail

31 July 2024 6	Kuala Lumpur City	3–0	Sabah	Kuala Lumpur
	Ko Kwang-min 45' (o.g.); Paulo Josué 61'; Zhafri Yahya 88'; Brendan Gan (yellow card) 34'; Giancarlo Gallifuoco (yellow card) 45'; Amirul Aiman (yellow card) 90+2'	Report	Rawilson Batuil (red card) 44'	Stadium: Kuala Lumpur Stadium; Attendance: 1,029; Referee: Suhaizi Shukri

10 August 2024 7	Kuala Lumpur City	0–2	Terengganu	Kuala Lumpur
	Kenny Pallraj (yellow card) 84'	Report	Manny Ott 45+13'; Safawi Rasid 70'	Stadium: Kuala Lumpur Stadium; Attendance: 1,376; Referee: Tuan Yaasin

16 August 2024 8	PDRM	2–1	Kuala Lumpur City	Selayang
	Ifedayo Olusegun 9'; Fadi Awad 65'; Amir Saiful (yellow card) 53'; Badrul Affendy (yellow card) 76'; Aremu Timothy (yellow card) 78'	Report	Jovan Motika 51'; Paulo Josué (yellow card) 41'; Kamal Azizi (yellow card) 89'	Stadium: MP Selayang Stadium; Attendance: 364; Referee: Fusser Sallih

14 September 2024 9	Kuala Lumpur City	5–0	Kedah Darul Aman	Kuala Lumpur
	Jovan Motika 14' (yellow card) 46'; Hazrie Balqief Mohammad Zulhadi 23' (o.g.); Zhafri Yahya 26'; Paulo Josué 49', 58'; Kenny Pallraj (yellow card) 61'	Report	Azim Anuar (yellow card) 24'	Stadium: Kuala Lumpur Stadium; Attendance: 1,182; Referee: Usaid Jamal

21 September 2024 10	Perak	1–0	Kuala Lumpur City	Perak
	Luka Milunović 62'; Tommy Mawat (yellow card) 53'; Shivan Pillay (yellow card) 72'; Haziq Nadzli (yellow card) 90+3'	Report	Adrijan Rudović (yellow card) 10'; Ryan Lambert (yellow card) 36'; Kamal Azizi (yellow card) 58'	Stadium: Perak Stadium; Attendance: 2,458; Referee: S. Logeswaran

29 September 2024 11	Kuala Lumpur City	4–2	Penang	Kuala Lumpur
	Paulo Josué 8'; Jovan Motika 42' (yellow card) 29'; Haqimi Azim 54', 74'; Zhafri Yahya (yellow card) 28'; Kenny Pallraj (yellow card) 36'; Giancarlo Gallifuoco (yellow card) 73'	Report	Rodrigo Dias 9'; Adib Ra'op 46'; Izzat Zikri Iziruddin (yellow card) 45+3'; Fairuz Zakaria (yellow card) 67'; Namathevan Arunasalam (yellow card) 83'	Stadium: Kuala Lumpur Stadium; Attendance: 1,017; Referee: Zamzaidi Katimin

18 October 2024 12	Kelantan Darul Naim	1–3	Kuala Lumpur City	Kuala Lumpur
21:00 MYT	Washington Brandão 56'; Hafizal Mohamad (yellow card) 18'; Umeir Aznan (yellow card) 20'; Amirul Shafik bin Che Soh (yellow card) 50'	Report	Nicholas Swirad 64'; Paulo Josué 80', 90+2' (yellow card) 4'; Jovan Motika (yellow card) 54'; Adrijan Rudović (yellow card) 85'	Stadium: Kuala Lumpur Stadium (Note: Location changed due to Sultan Ibrahim Stadium undergoing renovation. However, Kelantan Darul Naim FC will still be the designated "Home Team" for this match.); Attendance: 818; Referee: Razlan Joffri Ali

26 October 2024 13	Kuching City	3–1	Kuala Lumpur City	Kuching
21:00 MYT	Giancarlo Gallifuoco 1' (o g.); Petrus Shitembi 45+2' (yellow card) 56'; Kipré Tchétché 68' (pen.); Jimmy Raymond (yellow card) 48'; Nur Shamie (yellow card) 85'	Report	Paulo Josué 62' (pen.); Brendan Gan (yellow card) 88'	Stadium: Sarawak Stadium; Attendance: 1,210; Referee: Usaid Jamal

20 April 2025 14 (Rescheduled)	Kuala Lumpur City	5–2	Kelantan Darul Naim	Kuala Lumpur
	Zhafri Yahya 24', 45+1'; Paulo Josué 71' (yellow card) 4'; Haqimi Azim 74'; Ryan Lambert 86'		Adam Danial Md Zaid 45'; Fazrul Amir 53'	Stadium: Kuala Lumpur Stadium

8 December 2024 15	Johor Darul Ta'zim	3–0	Kuala Lumpur City	Johor
	Arif Aiman 12', 36', 42' (pen.)	Report	Declan Lambert (yellow card) 26'; Adrijan Rudović (yellow card) 43'	Stadium: Sultan Ibrahim Stadium; Attendance: 9,808; Referee: Fitri Maskon

17 December 2024 16	Kuala Lumpur City	2–1	Negeri Sembilan	Kuala Lumpur
	Paulo Josué 9'; Brendan Gan 12'; Anwar Ibrahim (yellow card) 58'; Declan Lambert (yellow card) 89'; Sharvin Selvakumaran 90+2'	Report	Jacque Faye 14' (yellow card) 56'	Stadium: Kuala Lumpur Stadium; Attendance: 232; Referee: Mohd Nafeez

12 January 2025 17	Selangor	1–0	Kuala Lumpur City	Petaling Jaya
	Alvin Fortes 62'; Nooa Laine (yellow card) 20'	Report	Adrijan Rudović (yellow card) 4'; Sean Giannelli (yellow card) 16'; Arif Shaqirin Suhaimi (yellow card) 90+6'	Stadium: Petaling Jaya Stadium; Attendance: 5,690; Referee: Tuan Yassin

26 January 2025 18	Sri Pahang	1–1	Kuala Lumpur City	Kuantan
	Stefano Brundo 80' (pen.); Ezequiel Agüero (yellow card) 48'; Saiful Jamaluddin (yellow card) 90+3'	Report	Kenny Pallraj 45'; Ryan Lambert (yellow card) 18'; Jovan Motika (yellow card) 65'; Haqimi Azim (yellow card) 90+6'	Stadium: Darul Makmur Stadium; Attendance: 956; Referee: Amirul Izwan Yaacob

21 February 2025 19 (Rescheduled)	Sabah	1–1	Kuala Lumpur City	Kota Kinabalu
21:00 MYT	Kumaahran Sathasivam 7'; Telmo Castanheira (yellow card) 85'	Report	Haqimi Azim 81' (yellow card) 87'	Stadium: Likas Stadium; Attendance: 1,799; Referee: Faizudin Ismail

14 February 2025 20	Terengganu	1–2	Kuala Lumpur City	Terengganu
	Safwan Mazlan 15'; Nurillo Tukhtasinov (yellow card) 50'	Report	Paulo Josué 45+1'; Patrick Reichelt 83'; Ryan Lambert (yellow card) 55'	Stadium: Sultan Mizan Zainal Abidin Stadium; Attendance: 1,103; Referee: Amirul Izwan Yaacob

26 February 2025 21	Kuala Lumpur City	2–1	PDRM	Kuala Lumpur
	Paulo Josué 23'; Haqimi Azim 50'; Kenny Pallraj (yellow card) 40'; Ryan Lambert (yellow card) 85'; Hakim Khairul (yellow card) 86'	Report	Aremu Timothy (yellow card) 46'; Fadi Awad (yellow card) 52'	Stadium: Kuala Lumpur Stadium; Attendance: 345; Referee: Usaid Jamal

7 March 2025 22	Kedah Darul Aman	2–3	Kuala Lumpur City	Alor Setar
	Miloš Gordić 25'; Fadzrul Danel 65' (yellow card) 90+3'; Heshamudin Ahmad (yellow card) 33'	Report	Paulo Josué 45+2', 62'; Sean Giannelli 86'; Declan Lambert (yellow card) 36'; Jovan Motika (yellow card) 49'; Brendan Gan (yellow card) 53'; Giancarlo Gallifuoco (yellow card) 76'; Arif Shaqirin (yellow card) 90'	Stadium: Darul Aman Stadium; Attendance: 639; Referee: Amirul Izwan Yaacob

6 April 2025 23	Kuala Lumpur City	1–2	Perak	Kuala Lumpur
	Paulo Josué 31'; Declan Lambert (yellow card) 76'		Luciano Guaycochea 77' (pen.); Nur Azfar 80'	Stadium: Kuala Lumpur Stadium

13 April 2025 24 (Rescheduled)	Penang	1–0	Kuala Lumpur City	George Town
	Alif Ikmalrizal 27'; Richmond Ankrah (yellow card) 40'; Adib Ra'op (yellow card) 75'; Neto (yellow card) 80'; Akid Zamri (yellow card) 90+3'; Sikh Izhan (yellow card) 90+8'		Patrick Reichelt (yellow card) 26'; Adrijan Rudović (yellow card) 40' (yellow-red card); Kenny Pallraj (yellow card) 42'	Stadium: City Stadium

==== Table ====
Pos	Team	Pld	W	D	L	GF	GA	GD	Pts	Qualification or relegation
4	Kuching City	24	10	9	5	38	28	+10	39	
5	Terengganu	24	9	8	7	35	26	+9	35	
6	Kuala Lumpur City	24	11	4	9	40	33	+7	31 (Note: On 5 Aug 2024, Kuala Lumpur City were deducted six points for inaccurate or false declarations in their club licensing application.)	
7	Perak	24	8	6	10	36	36	0	30	Withdrawn from Super League (Note: Perak and Sri Pahang withdrew at end of season and dissolved. Not applying for a national licence.)
8	Sri Pahang	24	7	8	9	35	39	−4	29	Withdrawn from Super League

Source: MFL
Rules for classification: 1) Points; 2) Goal difference; 3) Goals scored;

=== Malaysia FA Cup ===
14 June 2024 Round of 16	Kuala Lumpur City (1)	2–3 (a.e.t.)	Kuching City (1)	Cheras
18:30 UTC+8	Haqimi 14'; Josué 39'; Kenny Pallraj (yellow card) 79'; Giancarlo Gallifuoco (yellow card) 98'; Declan Lambert (yellow card) 101'; Sharvin Selvakumaran (yellow card) 112'	Report	Anyie 26'; Shamie 68'; Zahrul 120+3'; Rodney Celvin (yellow card) 31'; Pedro Henrique (yellow card) 92'; Yuki Tanigawa (yellow card) 102'; Filemon Anyie (yellow card) 106'	Stadium: Kuala Lumpur Stadium; Attendance: 309; Referee: Tuan Mohd Yaasin

=== Malaysia Cup ===
==== Round of 16 ====
22 November 2024 R16 1st leg	Kedah Darul Aman	3–2	Kuala Lumpur City	Alor Setar
21:00 MYT	Nordé 27', 30'; Nurullaev 68'; Hasbullah Abu Bakar (yellow card) 15'	Report	R. Lambert 13'; Motika 72'; Giancarlo Gallifuoco (yellow card) 32'; Brendan Gan (yellow card) 68'; Kamal Azizi (yellow card) 90+5'	Stadium: Darul Aman Stadium; Attendance: 3,386; Referee: Faizudin Ismail

1 December 2024 R16 2nd leg	Kuala Lumpur City	4–1 (6–4 agg.)	Kedah Darul Aman	Kuala Lumpur
21:00 MYT	Josué 14'; Motika 19'; R. Lambert 41'; Zhafri 90+2'; Giancarlo Gallifuoco (yellow card) 32'	Report	Gordić 74'; Amirul Hisyam (yellow card) 66'; Loqman Hakim (yellow card) 78'	Stadium: Kuala Lumpur Stadium; Attendance: 1,778; Referee: Fitri Maskon

==== Quarter Final ====
13 December 2024 QF 1st leg	Kuala Lumpur City	1–2	Johor Darul Ta'zim	Cheras
--:-- MYT	Brendan 89'; Jovan Motika (yellow card) 37'	Report	Bérgson 33'; Heberty 79'; Jordi Amat (yellow card) 67'	Stadium: Kuala Lumpur Stadium; Attendance: 3,204; Referee: Suhaizi Shukri

21 December 2024 QF 2nd leg	Johor Darul Ta'zim	4–0 (6–1 agg.)	Kuala Lumpur City	Johor
--:-- MYT	Arif Aiman 36' (pen.); Bérgson 45+2', 56' (pen.); Muñiz 62'; Feroz Baharudin (yellow card) 78'	Report	Zhafri Yayah (yellow card) 13'; Hadi Mizei @ Termizi (yellow card) 45'; Suhaimi Abu (yellow card) 73'	Stadium: Sultan Ibrahim Stadium; Attendance: 14,894; Referee: S. Logeswaran

=== ASEAN Club Championship ===
==== Group stage ====
Pos	Team	Pld	W	D	L	GF	GA	GD	Pts	Qualification	CAH	BUR	KLC	BOR	LCS	KAY
1	(Vietnam) Cong An Hanoi	5	5	0	0	15	6	+9	15	Advance to Semi-finals		2–1		3–2	5–0	
2	(Thailand) Buriram United	5	3	1	1	13	2	+11	10	Advance to Semi-finals			1–0	4–0		7–0
3	(Malaysia) Kuala Lumpur City	5	2	0	3	4	6	−2	6 (Note: Ranked on head-to-head points: Kuala Lumpur City (3); Borneo (0).)		2–3			1–0		1–0
4	(Indonesia) Borneo	5	2	0	3	7	9	−2	6						3–0	2–1
5	(Singapore) Lion City Sailors	5	1	1	3	2	10	−8	4			0–0	2–0			
6	(Philippines) Kaya–Iloilo	5	1	0	4	4	12	−8	3		1–2				2–0	

Source: ASEAN United FC
Rules for classification: Tiebreakers
Notes:

22 August 2024 Matchday 1	Kuala Lumpur City (Malaysia)	1–0	(Philippines) Kaya-Iloilo	Kuala Lumpur
21:00 UTC+8	Haqimi Azim 12'; Kenny Pallraj (yellow card) 49'	Report	Kaishu Yamazaki (yellow card) 36'; Mar Diano (yellow card) 79'; Fitch Arboleda (yellow card) 90+3'	Stadium: Kuala Lumpur Stadium; Referee: Qasim Al-Hatmi (Oman)

26 September 2024 Matchday 2	Kuala Lumpur City (Malaysia)	1–0	(Indonesia) Borneo	Kuala Lumpur
21:00 UTC+8	Brendan Gan 77'; Paulo Josué (yellow card) 7'; Kenny Pallraj (yellow card) 37'	Report	Léo Gaúcho (yellow card) 84'	Stadium: Kuala Lumpur Stadium; Referee: Omar Al-Yaqoubi (Oman)

9 January 2025 Matchday 3	Lion City Sailors (Singapore)	2–0	(Malaysia) Kuala Lumpur City	Jalan Besar, Singapore
	Bailey Wright 26'; Maxime Lestienne 66'; Rui Pires (yellow card) 32'	Report	Paulo Josué (yellow card) 12'; Arif Shaqirin (yellow card) 85'	Stadium: Jalan Besar Stadium; Referee: Shen Yinhao (China)

23 January 2025 Matchday 4	Kuala Lumpur City (Malaysia)	2–3	(Vietnam) Cong An Hanoi	Kuala Lumpur
21:00 UTC+8	Adrijan Rudović 24' (yellow card) 74'; Paulo Josué 32' (yellow card) 6' (red card) 88'; Zhafri Yahya (yellow card) 31'; Kamal Azizi (red card) 76'; Haqimi Azim (yellow card) 90+8'	Report	Nguyen Quang Hai 10'; Bui Hoang Viet Anh 67'; Lê Văn Đô 90+1'; Nguyễn Đình Bắc (yellow card) 90+4'	Stadium: Kuala Lumpur Stadium; Referee: Kim Dae-Yong (South Korea)

6 February 2025 Matchday 5	Buriram United (Thailand)	1–0	(Malaysia) Kuala Lumpur City	Buriram
19:30 UTC+7	Lucas Crispim 37'; Chatchai Budprom (yellow card) 45'	Report	Patrick Reichelt (yellow card) 45'; Giancarlo Gallifuoco (yellow card) 45+2'	Stadium: Chang Arena; Referee: Koji Takasaki (Japan)

== Club statistics ==
Correct as of match played on 22 Aug 2023

=== Appearances ===
@ 20 Apr 2025

No.	Pos.	Player	Malaysia Super League		FA Cup		Malaysia Cup		Shopee Cup		Total	
No.	Pos.	Player	Apps.	Goals	Apps.	Goals	Apps.	Goals	Apps.	Goals	Apps.	Goals
1	GK	(New Zealand) Lawton Green	0+1	0	0	0	0	0	0	0	1	0
4	DF	(Malaysia) Kamal Azizi	18+4	0	0	0	3	0	4	0	29	0
5	DF	(Montenegro) Adrijan Rudović	20	0	1	0	4	0	5	1	30	1
6	MF	(Malaysia) (England) Ryan Lambert	18+2	1	1	0	3	2	5	0	29	3
7	FW	(Bosnia and Herzegovina) Jovan Motika	21+2	4	1	0	3	2	4	0	31	6
8	MF	(Malaysia) Zhafri Yahya	20+1	4	0	0	2+1	0	3+2	0	29	4
9	DF	(Australia) Giancarlo Gallifuoco	22	0	1	0	2	0	5	0	30	0
11	MF	(Philippines) (Germany) Patrick Reichelt	8+11	0	0+1	0	1	0	2+2	0	25	0
12	DF	(Malaysia) (England) Declan Lambert	21	0	1	0	2	0	5	0	29	0
16	MF	(Malaysia) J.Partiban	8+8	0	0+1	0	3+1	0	1+2	0	24	0
17	FW	(Malaysia) (Italy) Sean Giannelli	10+6	1	1	0	0	0	0+3	0	20	1
18	DF	(Malaysia) Mahalli Jasuli	0+8	0	0+1	0	2	0	0+2	0	13	0
20	MF	(Malaysia) Amirul Aiman	0+5	0	0	0	1+1	0	0	0	7	0
21	MF	(Malaysia) Kenny Pallraj	18	1	0	0	3	0	5	0	27	1
22	GK	(Malaysia) Hafizul Hakim	5+1	0	0	0	0	0	2	0	8	0
23	DF	(Malaysia) (England) Nicholas Swirad	2+5	1	0+1	0	0	0	0	0	8	1
25	MF	(Malaysia) Anwar Ibrahim	2+2	0	0	0	2+1	0	0+1	0	8	0
28	FW	(Malaysia) (Brazil) Paulo Josué	22	17	1	1	1	1	4	1	28	20
29	MF	(Malaysia) Arif Shaqirin	0+11	0	0	0	0+1	0	0+3	0	15	0
30	GK	(Malaysia) Azri Ghani	16	0	1	0	3	0	3	0	23	0
32	MF	(Malaysia) Afiq Halim	0	0	0	0	0+1	0	0	0	1	0
34	MF	(Malaysia) Khairul Naim	0	0	0	0	0+1	0	0	0	1	0
35	MF	(Malaysia) Akimie Amran	0	0	0	0	0+1	0	0	0	1	0
36	MF	(Malaysia) Azim Nadim	0	0	0	0	0+1	0	0	0	1	0
37	FW	(Malaysia) Haqimi Azim	14+5	5	1	1	1	0	4	1	25	7
42	MF	(Malaysia) Suhaimi Abu	0+3	0	0	0	0+2	0	0	0	5	0
66	MF	(Malaysia) Nabil Hakim	0+3	0	0	0	1	0	0+1	0	5	0
70	MF	(Malaysia) Hadi Mizei Termizi	0	0	0	0	1+1	0	0	0	2	0
77	MF	(Malaysia) Sharvin Selvakumaran	0+14	1	0+1	0	1	0	1+2	0	19	1
88	MF	(Malaysia) (Australia) Brendan Gan	15+1	2	1	0	4	1	2	1	23	4
Players who have contracts but have left on loan to other clubs
14	FW	(Serbia) Lazar Sajcic	0	0	0	0	0	0	0	0	0	0
