= 2023 Kuala Lumpur City F.C. season =

Kuala Lumpur City
2023 season
- President: Shahidan Kassim
- CEO: Stanley Bernard
- Manager: Nenad Baćina
- Stadium: Kuala Lumpur Stadium
- Malaysia Super League: 7th
- Malaysia FA Cup: Runner-up
- Malaysia Cup: Semi-finals
- Top goalscorer: League: Paulo Josué (11); All: Romel Morales (14)
- Average home league attendance: 1,764
Home colours	Away colours

The 2023 season was the 45th season in the existence of Kuala Lumpur City's and the club's 3rd consecutive season in the top flight of Malaysian football. In addition to the domestic league, the club also participating in this season's edition of Malaysia FA Cup and the Malaysia Cup.

== Management team ==
Position	Name
Manager/Head coach	(Croatia) Bojan Hodak (until 26 August 2023)
Manager/Head coach	(Croatia) Nenad Bacina (from 4 August 2023)
Assistant head coach	(Croatia) Miroslav Kuljanac
Assistant coach	(Croatia) Miro Petric
Assistant coach	(Malaysia) Shukor Adan
Goalkeeper coach	(Brazil) Guilherme Azevedo
Fitness coach	(Malaysia) Afeeq Aqmal
Team doctor	(Malaysia) Adzlan Amin
Team doctor	(Malaysia) Hannan Haziq
Physiotherapist	(Malaysia) Afiqfuddin Salleh
Physiotherapist	(Malaysia) Renesh

== Squad information ==
=== First-team squad ===
As of 25 February 2023

Note: Flags indicate national team as defined under FIFA eligibility rules; some limited exceptions apply. Players may hold more than one non-FIFA nationality.

No.	Pos.	Nation	Player
1	GK	PHI	Kevin Ray Mendoza ^{S}
3	DF	MAS	Muhammad Faudzi
4	DF	MAS	Kamal Azizi
5	DF	CRO	Matko Zirdum ^{I}
6	DF	MAS	Ryan Lambert
7	MF	COL	Romel Morales ^{I}
8	MF	MAS	Zhafri Yahya
9	DF	AUS	Giancarlo Gallifuoco ^{A}
12	DF	MAS	Declan Lambert
14	MF	MAS	Akram Mahinan
15	DF	MAS	Khair Jones
16	MF	MAS	Partiban Janasekaran
17	MF	MAS	Sean Giannelli
19	MF	ITA	Sebastian Avanzini ^{I}

No.	Pos.	Nation	Player
20	GK	MAS	Azim Al-Amin ^{U23}
21	MF	MAS	Kenny Pallraj
23	FW	CIV	Kipré Tchétché ^{I}
25	DF	MAS	Anwar Ibrahim
26	MF	MAS	Saravanan Thirumurugan ^{U23}
28	MF	BRA	Paulo Josué (captain)
30	GK	MAS	Azri Ghani
33	FW	MAS	Juzaerul Jasmi ^{U23}
37	FW	MAS	Haqimi Azim Rosli ^{U20}
41	MF	MAS	Firdaus Saiyadi (on loan from Perak)
48	FW	MAS	Faizal Hafiq
49	MF	MAS	Hadi Mizei
77	DF	MAS	Nazirul Naim

Remarks:
^{S} These players are registered as ASEAN foreign players.
^{I} These players are registered as International foreign players.
^{A} These players are registered as Asia foreign players.
^{U23} These players are registered as Under-23 players.
^{U20} These players are registered as Under-20 players.

=== Out on loan ===
Note: Flags indicate national team as defined under FIFA eligibility rules; some limited exceptions apply. Players may hold more than one non-FIFA nationality.

No.	Pos.	Nation	Player
29	MF	MAS	Arif Shaqirin (loan to Perak)

== Transfers ==
In: Note: Flags indicate national team as defined under FIFA eligibility rules; some limited exceptions apply. Players may hold more than one non-FIFA nationality.

No.	Pos.	Nation	Player
—	FW	BRA	Caion (from Selangor)
—	FW	CIV	Kipré Tchétché (from Terengganu)
—	DF	CRO	Matko Zirdum (from (Croatia) Slaven Belupo)
—	FW	PHI	Patrick Reichelt (from (Thailand) PT Prachuap)
—	MF	MAS	Firdaus Saiyadi (on loan from Perak)
—	MF	ITA	Sebastian Avanzini (from (Denmark) Hobro)
—	DF	MAS	Nazirul Naim (from Sabah)
—	FW	MAS	Sean Giannelli (from Sri Pahang)
—	MF	MAS	Saravanan Thirumurugan (from Selangor II)
—	FW	MAS	Juzaerul Jasmi
—	DF	MAS	Khair Jones (from Negeri Sembilan)
—	FW	MAS	Faizal Hafiq
—	MF	MAS	Hadi Mizei

Out: Note: Flags indicate national team as defined under FIFA eligibility rules; some limited exceptions apply. Players may hold more than one non-FIFA nationality.

No.	Pos.	Nation	Player
—	FW	GHA	Jordan Mintah (loan return to Terengganu)
—	FW	CGO	Kévin Koubemba (to (Ukraine) Chornomorets Odesa)
—	MF	MAS	Hadin Azman (to Penang)
—	DF	MAS	Irfan Zakaria (to Sabah)
—	DF	MAS	Nik Shahrul
—	DF	MAS	Nik Umar
—	MF	MAS	Fakrul Aiman
—	FW	MAS	Safee Sali (retired)
—	DF	MAS	Azhar Apandi
—	MF	MAS	Izreen Izwandy
—	MF	MAS	Arif Shaqirin (loan to Perak)
—	DF	MAS	Nabil Hakim
—	MF	MAS	Ridhwan Nazri

== Pre-season and friendlies ==
Win Draw Loss Fixtures

29 January 2023 Friendly	Kuala Lumpur City	0–0	Terengganu	Cheras
20:30 MYT (UTC+8)				Stadium: Kuala Lumpur Stadium

31 January 2023 Friendly	Kuala Lumpur City	0–0	Kelantan United	Cheras
20:30 MYT (UTC+8)				Stadium: Kuala Lumpur Stadium

4 February 2023 Friendly	Kuala Lumpur City	3–0	Perak	Cheras
21:00 MYT (UTC+8)	Caion 33' (pen.); Paulo Josué 52'; Gallifuoco 74'			Stadium: Kuala Lumpur Stadium

14 February 2023 Friendly	Kuala Lumpur City	1–1	Negeri Sembilan	Cheras
20:30 MYT (UTC+8)				Stadium: Kuala Lumpur Stadium

== Competitions ==
=== Malaysia Super League ===
25 February 2023 1	Kuala Lumpur City	2–2	Penang	Cheras
21:00 MYT (UTC+8)	Paulo Josué 15', 72', (yellow card) 56'; Morales (yellow card) 29'; Kenny (yellow card) 31'; Anwar (yellow card) 39'	Report	Rahmat (yellow card) 29'; Namathevan (yellow card) 38' (yellow-red card) 57'; Hadin 74'; Gomes 86'	Stadium: Kuala Lumpur Stadium; Attendance: 1,291; Referee: Tuan Mohd Yaasin Tuan Mohd Hanafiah

1 March 2023 2	Kuala Lumpur City	0–3	Johor Darul Ta'zim	Cheras
20:15 MYT (UTC+8)	Avanzini (yellow card) 48'; Kenny (yellow card) 67'; Haqimi (yellow card) 82'	Report	Morales 41' (o.g.); Endrick 52', (yellow card) 57'; Velázquez (yellow card) 77'; Arif 90'	Stadium: Kuala Lumpur Stadium; Attendance: 6,847; Referee: Mohd Fusser Mad Sallih

5 March 2023 3	Terengganu	0–0	Kuala Lumpur City	Kuala Terengganu
21:00 MYT (UTC+8)	Kulmatov (yellow card) 75'	Report	Lambert (yellow card) 10'; Avanzini (yellow card) 66'; Kenny (yellow card) 89'; Akram (yellow card) 90+3'	Stadium: Sultan Mizan Zainal Abidin Stadium; Attendance: 11,560; Referee: Mohamad Zamzaidi Katimin

11 March 2023 4	Negeri Sembilan	0–0	Kuala Lumpur City	Paroi
21:00 MYT (UTC+8)		Report		Stadium: Tuanku Abdul Rahman Stadium; Attendance: 1,614; Referee: Muhammad Usaid Jamal

17 March 2023 5	Kelantan	2–2	Kuala Lumpur City	Kota Bharu
20:15 MYT (UTC+8)	Kenny 41' (o.g.); Fazrul 45+2'; Arqués (yellow card) 90+2'; Amin (yellow card) 90+3'; Arip (yellow card) 90+5'	Report	Tchétché 11'; Lambert 34'	Stadium: Sultan Muhammad IV Stadium; Attendance: 6,678; Referee: S. Logeswaran

31 March 2023 6	Kuala Lumpur City	1–3	Selangor	Cheras
22:00 MYT (UTC+8)	Tchétché 24'; Paulo Josué (yellow card) 73'	Report	Agyarkwa (yellow card) 19'; Brendan (yellow card) 25'; del Valle 32' (pen.); Faisal 40' (pen.); Quentin (yellow card) 45+1'	Stadium: Kuala Lumpur Stadium; Attendance: 4,204; Referee: Mohammad Zamzaidi Katimin

5 April 2023 7	Kuala Lumpur City	2–0	Sabah	Cheras
22:00 MYT (UTC+8)	Saravanan 15'; Muhammad (yellow card) 45+3'; Lambert (yellow card) 65'; Giannelli 90+4', (yellow card) 90+5'	Report	Wilkin (yellow card) 43'; Peres (yellow card) 45+1'; Dominic (yellow card) 58'	Stadium: Kuala Lumpur Stadium; Attendance: 1,194; Referee: Suhaizi Shukri

10 April 2023 8	Kuala Lumpur City	1–0	Perak	Cheras
22:00 MYT (UTC+8)	Avanzini 45+3'; Saravanan (yellow card) 27' (yellow-red card) 63'	Report	Shafizi (yellow card) 45'; Guaycochea (yellow card) 45+3'; Ikhwan (yellow card) 73'	Stadium: Kuala Lumpur Stadium; Attendance: 1,260; Referee: Suhaizi Shukri

18 April 2023 9	Kedah Darul Aman	2–3	Kuala Lumpur City	Alor Setar
22:00 (UTC+08:00)	Balotelli 25'; Ciger 30'	Report	Paulo Josué 11'; Morales 48'; Lambert (yellow card) 58'; Caion 75'	Stadium: Darul Aman Stadium; Attendance: 2,590; Referee: Nazmi Nasaruddin

27 April 2023 10	Kuala Lumpur City	3–0	PDRM	Cheras
20:15 MYT (UTC+08:00)	Morales 14'; Paulo Josué 22'; Caion (yellow card) 32'; Tchétché 87'; Gallifuoco (red card) 90+2'	Report	Arif (yellow card) 23'; Faye (yellow card) 81'; Okwuosa (red card) 90+2'; Awad (yellow card) 90+5'	Stadium: Kuala Lumpur Stadium; Attendance: 627; Referee: Usaid Jamal

14 May 2023 4	Negeri Sembilan	2–1	Kuala Lumpur City	Paroi
21:00 MYT (UTC+08:00)	Zaquan 74'; Safuwan (yellow card) 84', (goal) 87'	Report	Avanzini (yellow card) 60'; Zhafri 84'	Stadium: Tuanku Abdul Rahman Stadium; Attendance: 452; Referee: Mohd Fusser Mad Salih

20 May 2023 11	Kelantan United	1–3	Kuala Lumpur City	Kota Bharu
21:00 MYT (UTC+08:00)	Khairu (yellow card) 10'; Fauzan (yellow card) 13'; Devid 34'	Report	T. Saravanan 17'; Giannelli 23'; Zirdum (yellow card) 44'; Zhafri (yellow card) 45'; Morales (yellow card) 65'; Azri (yellow card) 87'; Paulo Josué 90+5'; Kenny (yellow card) 90+9'	Stadium: Sultan Muhammad IV Stadium; Attendance: 224; Referee: Fitri Maskon

24 May 2023 12	Kuala Lumpur City	1–1	Kuala Lumpur City	Cheras
21:00 MYT (UTC+08:00)	Tchétché 86' (pen.)	Report	Tanigawa (yellow card) 45+1'; Dzulazlan (yellow card) 70'; Kamara 90+4'	Stadium: Kuala Lumpur Stadium; Attendance: 610; Referee: Zamzaidi Katimin

4 June 2023 13	Sri Pahang	1–2	Kuala Lumpur City	Kuantan
21:00 MYT (UTC+08:00)	Rowley (yellow card) 19'; Brundo 58' (pen.); Fadhli (yellow card) 83'	Report	Tchétché 5'; Lambert (yellow card) 21'; Avanzini (yellow card) 42'; Paulo Josué 76'	Stadium: Darul Makmur Stadium; Attendance: 4,804; Referee: Razlan Joffri Ali

8 June 2023 14	Penang	1–1	Kuala Lumpur City	Georgetown
21:00 MYT (UTC+08:00)	Zahril Azri (yellow card) 36'; Gomes 45+1'; Adib (yellow card) 46'; Rahmat (yellow card) 90+3' (yellow-red card) 90+8'	Report	Tchétché 7'; Kenny (yellow card) 20'; Zhafri (yellow card) 45+3'; Avanzini (yellow card) 77'; Gallifuoco (red card) 79'; Lambert (yellow card) 90+8'	Stadium: City Stadium; Attendance: 1,455; Referee: Zamzaidi Katimin

3 July 2023 15	Johor Darul Ta’zim	6–1	Kuala Lumpur City	Iskandar Puteri
21:00 MYT (UTC+08:00)	Diogo 12', 35', 44'; Arif 13'; Velázquez (yellow card) 28'; Lowry (yellow card) 66'; Safiq 86'; Akhyar 88'	Report	Zirdum 54'; Akram (yellow card) 60'	Stadium: Sultan Ibrahim Stadium; Attendance: 11,691; Referee: S. Logeswaran

7 July 2023 16	Kuala Lumpur City	3–3	Terengganu	Cheras
21:00 MYT (UTC+08:00)	Gallifuoco 36'; Paulo Josué 42'; Morales 45+1'	Report	Nazari 29'; Kulmatov (yellow card) 34'; Hakim 50'; Mamut 59'	Stadium: Kuala Lumpur Stadium; Attendance: 1,464; Referee: Razlan Joffri Ali

15 July 2023 17	Kuala Lumpur City	1–1	Negeri Sembilan	Cheras
17:30 MYT (UTC+08:00)	Morales 40'; Anwar (yellow card) 85'; Kenny (yellow card) 90+1'	Report	Tommy (yellow card) 10'; Zainal (yellow card) 90+4'	Stadium: Kuala Lumpur Stadium; Attendance: 688; Referee: Zamzaidi Katimin

29 July 2023 18	Kuala Lumpur City	5–1	Kelantan	Cheras
17:30 MYT (UTC+08:00)	Zhafri 25'; Morales 47', 65', 90+1'; T. Saravanan (yellow card) 53'; Partiban 83'	Report	Rolón 3', (yellow card) 63'	Stadium: Kuala Lumpur Stadium; Attendance: 1,037; Referee: Faizudin Ismail

8 August 2023 19	Selangor	2–0	Kuala Lumpur City	Petaling Jaya
21:00 MYT (UTC+08:00)	Harith 32'; Safuwan (yellow card) 47'; V. Ruventhiran (yellow card) 59'; Ayron del Valle 76'	Report	Paulo Josué (yellow card) 62'; Gallifuoco (yellow card) 89'	Stadium: MBPJ Stadium; Attendance: 7,964; Referee: Suhaizi Shukri

13 August 2023 20	Sabah	3–2	Kuala Lumpur City	Kota Kinabalu
19:30 MYT (UTC+08:00)	Robbat (yellow card) 40'; Wilkin 52'; Park 79'; Peres 90'	Report	Morales (yellow card) 23', (goal) 60'; Haqimi 71'	Stadium: Likas Stadium; Attendance: 6,462; Referee: Suhaizi Shukri

27 August 2023 21	Perak	0–4	Kuala Lumpur City	Cheras
20:15 MYT (UTC+08:00)		Report	Tchétché 30'; Avanzini 47'; Paulo Josué 56'; Giannelli 88'; Kamal (yellow card) 90+1'	Stadium: Kuala Lumpur Stadium; Attendance: 6,998; Referee: Zamzaidi Katimin

30 September 2023 22	Kuala Lumpur City	0–1	Kedah Darul Aman	Cheras
21:00 MYT (UTC+08:00)		Report	Olusegun 45+4' (pen.); Ciger (yellow card) 50'; Fadzrul (yellow card) 64'	Stadium: Kuala Lumpur Stadium; Attendance: 2,068; Referee: S. Logeswaran

27 October 2023 23	PDRM	2–0	Kuala Lumpur City	Petaling Jaya
20:15 MYT (UTC+08:00)	Norfiqrie (yellow card) 20'; Macauley 60'; Awad 75'	Report	Akram (yellow card) 35'; Paulo Josué (yellow card) 85'	Stadium: MBPJ Stadium; Attendance: 149; Referee: Khirulazuan Kidam

26 November 2023 24	Kuala Lumpur City	3–0	Kelantan United	Cheras
21:00 MYT (UTC+08:00)	Zirdum 21'; Paulo Josué 68'; Tchétché 78'; T. Saravanan (yellow card) 90'	Report		Stadium: Kuala Lumpur Stadium; Attendance: 397; Referee: S. Logeswaran

10 December 2023 25	Kuching City	2–3	Kuala Lumpur City	Kuching
20:15 MYT (UTC+08:00)	Kamara 45+2'; Tanigawa 72'	Report	Akram (yellow card) 18'; Paulo Josué 19', 41'; Lambert (yellow card) 67'; Arif 81'; Zhafri (yellow card) 90+2'	Stadium: Sarawak Stadium; Attendance: 238; Referee: Usaid Jamal

16 December 2023 26	Kuala Lumpur City	0–0	Sri Pahang	Cheras
21:00 MYT (UTC+08:00)	Kamal (yellow card) 40'; Lambert (yellow card) 76'; Reichelt (yellow card) 90+3'	Report	Azwan (yellow card) 48'	Stadium: Kuala Lumpur Stadium; Attendance: 1,248; Referee: Abang Azharudin Abdullah

Pos	Team	Pld	W	D	L	GF	GA	GD	Pts	Qualification or relegation
5	Sri Pahang	26	13	6	7	44	33	+11	45	
6	Terengganu	26	11	7	8	45	34	+11	40	Qualification for the AFF Shopee Cup group stage (Note: Qualified as the 2023 Malaysia Cup & 2023 Malaysia FA Cup runner-up.)
7	Kuala Lumpur City	26	10	8	8	44	39	+5	38	Qualification for the AFF Shopee Cup group stage
8	PDRM	26	11	4	11	35	37	−2	37	
9	Negeri Sembilan	26	6	9	11	33	49	−16	27	

Source: MFL
Rules for classification: 1) Points; 2) Goal difference; 3) Number of goals scored.

=== Malaysia FA Cup ===
14 April 2023 Round of 16	Kuala Lumpur City	2–0	Immigration	Cheras
22:00 (UTC+08:00)	Firdaus (yellow card) 33'; T. Saravanan 45+2'; Haqimi (yellow card) 77'; Morales 83'	Report	Hafiz (yellow card) 32'; Hazim (yellow card) 69'; Nasriq (yellow card) 77'	Stadium: Kuala Lumpur Stadium; Attendance: 402; Referee: Abdul Rahman Wahab

28 May 2023 Quarter-final	Sabah	1–2	Kuala Lumpur City	Kota Kinabalu
22:00 (UTC+08:00)	Peres 6' (pen.)	Report	Morales 29'; Lambert (yellow card) 35'; T. Saravanan 44'	Stadium: Likas Stadium; Attendance: 6,797; Referee: Zamzaidi Katimin

25 June 2023 Semi-final	Terengganu	0–0 (a.e.t.) (2–4 SO)	Kuala Lumpur City	Kuala Terengganu
21:00 (UTC+08:00)	Krasniqi (yellow card) 66'; Safwan (yellow card) 90+1'; Azam (yellow card) 120+2'	Report	Paulo Josué (yellow card) 33'; Kamal (yellow card) 57'; Zhafri (yellow card) 86'	Stadium: Sultan Mizan Zainal Abidin Stadium; Attendance: 26,540; Referee: Suhaizi Shukri
	Shootout
	Arif (penalty scored); Sharif (penalty missed); Safwan (penalty scored); Krasniqi (penalty missed)		Paulo Josué (penalty scored); Morales (penalty scored); Akram (penalty scored); Zirdum (penalty missed); Gallifuoco (penalty scored)

22 July 2023 Final	Johor Darul Ta’zim	2–0	Kuala Lumpur City	Iskandar Puteri
21:00 (UTC+08:00)	Feroz (yellow card) 15'; Hong Wan 66'; Velázquez 74', (yellow card) 75'; Amat (yellow card) 79'	Report	Zhafri (yellow card) 14'; Avanzini (yellow card) 25'; Kamal (yellow card) 90+3'	Stadium: Sultan Ibrahim Stadium; Attendance: 33,598; Referee: Nazmi Nasaruddin

=== Malaysia Cup ===
==== Round of 16 ====
3 August 2023 1st leg	Penang	0–4	Kuala Lumpur City	George Town
21:00 (UTC+08:00)		Report	Tchétché 4', 26'; Zhafri 31'; Morales 84'	Stadium: City Stadium; Attendance: 1,201; Referee: Zamzaidi Katimin

18 August 2023 2nd leg	Kuala Lumpur City	1–0 (5–0 agg.)	Penang	Cheras
20:15 (UTC+08:00)	Tchétché 70'	Report		Stadium: Kuala Lumpur Stadium; Attendance: 570; Referee: Mohd Fusser Mad Sallih

==== Quarter-finals ====
17 September 2023 1st leg	Kuala Lumpur City	1–0	Sri Pahang	Cheras
20:15 (UTC+08:00)	Morales 73' (pen.)	Report		Stadium: Kuala Lumpur Stadium; Attendance: 1,697; Referee: Zamzaidi Katimin

24 September 2023 2nd leg	Sri Pahang	1–1 (1–2 agg.)	Kuala Lumpur City	Kuantan
17:30 (UTC+08:00)	Brundo 90+5' (pen.)	Report	Morales 29'	Stadium: Darul Makmur Stadium; Attendance: 4,041; Referee: Mohd Fusser Mad Sallih

==== Semi-finals ====
21 October 2023 1st leg	Kuala Lumpur City	1–2	Terengganu	Cheras
21:00 (UTC+08:00)	Tchétché 90+5' (pen.)	Report	Mamut 45+1'; Nik 89'	Stadium: Kuala Lumpur Stadium; Attendance: 4,210; Referee: Muhammad Usaid Jamal

3 November 2023 2nd leg	Terengganu	2–1 (2–4 agg.)	Kuala Lumpur	Kuala Terengganu
21:00 (UTC+08:00)	Mamut 42', 68'	Report	Morales 68'	Stadium: Sultan Mizan Zainal Abidin Stadium; Attendance: 25,221; Referee: Nazmi Nasaruddin

== Statistics ==
=== Appearances and goals ===
No.	Pos	Nat	Player	Total		League		FA Cup		Malaysia Cup	
No.	Pos	Nat	Player	Apps	Goals	Apps	Goals	Apps	Goals	Apps	Goals
Goalkeepers
1	GK	(Philippines) PHI	Kevin Ray Mendoza	16	0	10	0	1	0	5	0
20	GK	(Malaysia) MAS	Azim Al-Amin	6	0	3	0	3	0	0	0
30	GK	(Malaysia) MAS	Azri Ghani	14	0	13	0	0	0	1	0
Defenders
3	DF	(Malaysia) MAS	Muhammad Faudzi	9	0	2+5	0	0	0	1+1	0
4	DF	(Malaysia) MAS	Kamal Azizi	35	0	25+1	0	3	0	6	0
5	DF	(Croatia) CRO	Matko Zirdum	22	2	13+1	2	3	0	5	0
9	DF	(Australia) AUS	Giancarlo Gallifuoco	30	1	21	1	3+1	0	5	0
12	DF	(Malaysia) MAS	Declan Lambert	29	1	21	1	3	0	4+1	0
15	DF	(Malaysia) MAS	Khair Jones	5	0	0+4	0	0	0	0+1	0
19	DF	(Italy) ITA	Sebastian Avanzini	31	2	20+2	2	4	0	4+1	0
25	DF	(Malaysia) MAS	Anwar Ibrahim	11	0	3+4	0	1+1	0	0+2	0
77	DF	(Malaysia) MAS	Nazirul Naim	26	0	8+9	0	2+1	0	2+4	0
Midfielders
6	MF	(Malaysia) MAS	Ryan Lambert	30	0	21+1	0	3+1	0	3+1	0
7	MF	(Colombia) COL	Romel Morales	29	14	16+4	8	2+2	2	4+1	4
8	MF	(Malaysia) MAS	Zhafri Yahya	28	3	17+4	2	3	0	4	1
14	MF	(Malaysia) MAS	Akram Mahinan	21	0	5+8	0	0+2	0	4+2	0
16	MF	(Malaysia) MAS	Partiban	5	2	0+5	1	0	0+1	0	0
17	MF	(Malaysia) MAS	Sean Giannelli	21	3	5+10	3	1+1	0	1+3	0
21	MF	(Malaysia) MAS	Kenny Pallraj	24	0	15+4	0	1+1	0	2+1	0
26	MF	(Malaysia) MAS	Saravanan Thirumurugan	30	4	16+5	2	4	2	3+2	0
28	MF	(Brazil) BRA	Paulo Josué	31	11	21+3	11	3	0	4	0
29	MF	(Malaysia) MAS	Arif Shaqirin	3	1	0+1	1	0	0	0+2	0
41	MF	(Malaysia) MAS	Firdaus Saiyadi	5	0	0+3	0	1+1	0	0	0
49	MF	(Malaysia) MAS	Hadi Mizei	2	0	0+1	0	0	0	0+1	0
Forwards
10	FW	(Brazil) BRA	Caion	16	1	7+7	1	1+1	0	0	0
11	FW	(Philippines) PHI	Patrick Reichelt	15	0	6+5	0	1+1	0	1+1	0
23	FW	(Ivory Coast) CIV	Kipré Tchétché	30	11	14+9	8	1+1	0	4+1	3
37	FW	(Malaysia) MAS	Haqimi Azim	23	1	3+13	1	0+3	0	3+1	0
50	FW	(Malaysia) MAS	Sachin Samuel	1	0	0+1	0	0	0	0	0
51	FW	(Malaysia) MAS	Suhaimi Abu	2	0	1+1	0	0	0	0	0
Players transferred out during the season

Last updated: 3 November 2023
Source: Competitions

== Under-23s ==
=== Current squad ===
As of 6 March 2023

These Under-23 players or Kuala Lumpur City Extension participated in Malaysian Football League cup.

Note: Flags indicate national team as defined under FIFA eligibility rules; some limited exceptions apply. Players may hold more than one non-FIFA nationality.

No.	Pos.	Nation	Player
1	GK	MAS	Julian Bechler
20	GK	MAS	Azim Al Amin
24	DF	MAS	Khairul Naim Zainal Abidin
26	MF	MAS	Saravanan Thirumurugan
32	DF	MAS	Nashran Elias
33	DF	MAS	Juzaerul Jasmi (captain)
34	MF	MAS	Amirul Aiman
35	MF	MAS	Adib Faris
42	DF	MAS	Nadzwin Salleh
46	MF	MAS	Izreen Izwandy
47	DF	MAS	Faris Zabri
48	FW	MAS	Faizal Hafiq
49	MF	MAS	Hadi Mizei @ Termizi

No.	Pos.	Nation	Player
50	GK	MAS	Haziq Fitri
55	GK	MAS	Syafiq Sabaruddin
60	MF	MAS	Sachin Samuel
65	DF	MAS	Syahkhir Razali
69	FW	MAS	Suhaimi Abu
70	DF	MAS	Loquman Syadiq
71	MF	MAS	Azim Nadim
80	FW	MAS	Alif Safwan
87	MF	MAS	Amreel Iqbal
88	MF	MAS	Ridhwan Nazri
96	MF	MAS	Amirul Zul Aiman
99	FW	MAS	Wan Syamil Sulaiman

=== Coaching staff ===
- Head coach: Wan Rohaimi Wan Ismail
- Assistant head coach: Mohd Aslam Haja Najmudeen
- Assistant coach: Fadhil Hashim
- Goalkeeper coach: Zuraimi Hasan

=== MFL Cup ===
3 March 2023 1	Kuala Lumpur City Extension	1—0	Kelantan	Cheras
20:15 MYT (UTC+8)	Faizal Hafiq 76'	Report		Stadium: Kuala Lumpur Stadium; Attendance: 187; Referee: Muhammad Latiffi Mohd Zahrom

11 March 2023 2	Selangor II	0—1	Kuala Lumpur City Extension	Shah Alam
		Report		Stadium: UiTM Stadium

=== Appearances and goals ===
As of 3 March 2023

Player	Position	Appearances	Goals
Kuala Lumpur City Extension
(Malaysia) Azim Al Amin	GK	1	0
(Malaysia) Nashran Elias	DF	1	0
(Malaysia) Juzaerul Jasmi	DF	1	0
(Malaysia) Amirul Aiman	MF	1	0
(Malaysia) Faris Zabri	DF	1	0
(Malaysia) Faizal Hafiq	FW	1	1
(Malaysia) Hadi Mizei @ Termizi	MF	1	0
(Malaysia) Sachin Samuel	MF	1	0
(Malaysia) Suhaimi Abu	FW	1	0
(Malaysia) Loquman Syadiq	DF	1	0
(Malaysia) Alif Safwan	FW	1	0
(Malaysia) Khairul Naim	DF	1	0
(Malaysia) Izreen Izwandy	MF	1	0
(Malaysia) Azim Nadim	MF	1	0
(Malaysia) Amirul Zul Aiman	MF	1	0
Own goals			0
Total goals			1
