= 2022 Kuala Lumpur City F.C. season =

Kuala Lumpur City
2022 season
- President: Shahidan Kassim
- CEO: Stanley Bernard
- Manager: Bojan Hodak
- Stadium: Kuala Lumpur Stadium
- Malaysia Super League: 6th
- Malaysia FA Cup: Second round
- Malaysia Cup: Quarter-finals
- Piala Sumbangsih: Runners-up
- AFC Cup: Runners-up
- Top goalscorer: League: Paulo Josué (6); All: Paulo Josué (13)
Home colours	Away colours

The 2022 season was the 44th season in the existence of Kuala Lumpur City's and the club's 2nd consecutive season in the top flight of Malaysian football. In addition to the domestic league, Kuala Lumpur City participated in this season's edition of Malaysia FA Cup and the Malaysia Cup.

== Squad information ==
As of 22 February 2022

Note: Flags indicate national team as defined under FIFA eligibility rules; some limited exceptions apply. Players may hold more than one non-FIFA nationality.

No.	Pos.	Nation	Player
1	GK	PHI	Kevin Ray Mendoza
4	DF	MAS	Kamal Azizi
5	DF	MAS	Nik Shahrul
6	DF	MAS	Ryan Lambert
7	MF	COL	Romel Morales
8	MF	MAS	Zhafri Yahya
9	DF	AUS	Giancarlo Gallifuoco
10	FW	MAS	Safee Sali
11	MF	CGO	Kevin Koubemba
12	DF	MAS	Declan Lambert
14	MF	MAS	Akram Mahinan
15	DF	MAS	Azhar Apandi
16	MF	MAS	Partiban Janasekaran
17	DF	MAS	Irfan Zakaria

No.	Pos.	Nation	Player
19	MF	MAS	Izreen Izwandy
20	GK	MAS	Azim Amin
21	MF	MAS	Kenny Pallraj
22	DF	MAS	Nik Umar
25	DF	MAS	Anwar Ibrahim
27	MF	MAS	Hadin Azman
28	MF	BRA	Paulo Josué (captain)
29	MF	MAS	Arif Shaqirin
30	MF	MAS	Fakrul Aiman
33	DF	MAS	Muhammad Faudzi
44	GK	MAS	Azri Ghani
66	DF	MAS	Nabil Hakim
88	MF	MAS	Ridhwan Nazri

== Transfers ==
=== 1st leg ===
In: Note: Flags indicate national team as defined under FIFA eligibility rules; some limited exceptions apply. Players may hold more than one non-FIFA nationality.

No.	Pos.	Nation	Player
15	DF	MAS	Azhar Apandi (loan return from Perak)
11	FW	CGO	Kévin Koubemba (from (Albania) Teuta)
12	DF	MAS	Declan Lambert (from (Netherlands) Den Bosch)
22	DF	MAS	Nik Umar (from Selangor II)
33	DF	MAS	Muhammad Faudzi (from Terengganu)
44	GK	MAS	Azri Ghani (from Perak)
66	DF	MAS	Nabil Hakim (from Petaling Jaya City)
88	MF	MAS	Ridhwan Nazri (return from injury)

Out: Note: Flags indicate national team as defined under FIFA eligibility rules; some limited exceptions apply. Players may hold more than one non-FIFA nationality.

No.	Pos.	Nation	Player
22	GK	MAS	Khatul Anuar (to Penang)
2	DF	MAS	Wan Amirzafran (to Sri Pahang)
3	DF	MAS	Daniel Ting (to Selangor)
12	DF	MAS	Shukor Adan
13	FW	USA	Kyrian Nwabueze
23	FW	MAS	Indra Putra Mahayuddin (to Perak)
77	GK	MAS	Julian Bechler (to PDRM)

== Competitions ==
=== Piala Sumbangsih ===
26 February 2022 Piala Sumbangsih	Johor Darul Ta'zim	3–0	Kuala Lumpur City	Iskandar Puteri
21:00 UTC +8	Nazmi 26'; Forestieri 31'; Afiq 85'	Report		Stadium: Sultan Ibrahim Stadium; Attendance: 15,485; Referee: Nazmi Nasaruddin

=== Malaysia Super League ===
==== League table ====
Pos	Team	Pld	W	D	L	GF	GA	GD	Pts
4	Negeri Sembilan	22	12	5	5	33	26	+7	41
5	Selangor	22	8	6	8	39	33	+6	30
6	Kuala Lumpur City	22	8	5	9	30	31	−1	29
7	Sri Pahang	22	8	4	10	33	31	+2	28
8	Kedah Darul Aman	22	8	3	11	32	41	−9	27

Updated to match(es) played on unknown. Source: MFL
Rules for classification: 1) Points; 2) Goal difference; 3) Number of goals scored.

==== Matches ====
Win Draw Loss Fixtures

4 March 2022 1	Kuala Lumpur City	3–3	Selangor	Cheras
21:00 UTC +8	Gallifuoco (yellow card) 18' (yellow-red card) 73'; Zhafri 20'; Hadin 32'; Lamber 61'; Kenny (yellow card) 85'; Akram (yellow card) 90+3'	Report	Hyuri 18', (yellow card) 55'; Caion 27' (pen.), 78' (pen.); Syahir (yellow card) 85'	Stadium: Kuala Lumpur Stadium; Attendance: 2,517; Referee: Fitri Maskon

9 March 2022 2	Kedah Darul Aman	3–2	Kuala Lumpur City	Alor Setar
21:00 UTC +8	Syafiq 32'; Marcel (yellow card) 44'; Fayadh 67'; Buschening 69'	Report	Zhafri 29'; Koubemba 88'; Kenny (yellow card) 77'; Nabil (yellow card) 90+3'	Stadium: Darul Aman Stadium; Attendance: 2,555; Referee: Hamdan Awang

6 April 2022 3	Kuala Lumpur City	0–3	Johor Darul Ta'zim

9 April 2022 4	Kuala Lumpur City	2–0	Melaka United

16 April 2022 5	Kuala Lumpur City	2–0	Sabah

24 April 2022 6	Negeri Sembilan	2–1	Kuala Lumpur City

7 May 2022 7	Kuala Lumpur City	1–2	Sri Pahang

10 May 2022 8	Kuala Lumpur City	3–2	Penang

17 May 2022 9	Sarawak United	1–2	Kuala Lumpur City

18 June 2022 10	Terengganu	2–0	Kuala Lumpur City

16 July 2022 11	Kuala Lumpur City	0–0	Petaling Jaya City

20 July 2022 12	Selangor	1–1	Kuala Lumpur City

27 July 2022 13	Kuala Lumpur City	2–1	Kedah Darul Aman

1 August 2022 14	Johor Darul Ta'zim	5–0	Kuala Lumpur City

18 August 2022 15	Kuala Lumpur City	1–0	Negeri Sembilan

1 September 2022 16	Sabah	2–2	Kuala Lumpur City

11 September 2022 17	Sri Pahang	0–2	Kuala Lumpur City

15 September 2022 18	Melaka United	0–0	Kuala Lumpur City

24 September 2022 19	Penang	1–0	Kuala Lumpur City

28 September 2022 20	Kuala Lumpur City	5–0	Sarawak United

11 October 2022 21	Kuala Lumpur City	1–2	Terengganu

15 October 2022 22	Petaling Jaya City	1–0	Kuala Lumpur City

=== Malaysia FA Cup ===
13 March 2022 First round	Kuala Lumpur City	8–0	Langkawi City

8 July 2022 Second round	Selangor	1–0	Kuala Lumpur City

=== Malaysia Cup ===
27 October 2022 Round of 16 first leg	PDRM	0–3	Kuala Lumpur City	Cheras
21:00 UTC +8		Report	Lambert (yellow card) 13'; Morales 45+2', 79'; Paulo Josué 67'; Kenny (yellow card) 87'; Kamal (yellow card) 90+2'	Stadium: Kuala Lumpur Stadium; Attendance: 660; Referee: Abdul Rahman Wahab

1 November 2022 Round of 16 second leg	Kuala Lumpur City	1–0	PDRM	Cheras
21:00 UTC +8	Kenny (yellow card) 37'; Zhafri 89'	Report	Amir (yellow card) 4'; Amirul (yellow card) 70'	Stadium: Kuala Lumpur Stadium; Attendance: 507; Referee: S. Logeswaran

6 November 2022 Quarter-finals first leg	Kuala Lumpur City	0–1	Terengganu	Cheras
21:00 UTC +8	Paulo Josué (yellow card) 40'; Lambert (yellow card) 82'; Arif (yellow card) 84'	Report	Sherman 15', (yellow card) 29'; Adib (yellow card) 55'; Suhaimi (red card) 62'; Habib (yellow card) 74'; Shamirza (yellow card) 90+4'	Stadium: Kuala Lumpur Stadium; Attendance: 4,334; Referee: Mohd Nafeez Abd Wahab

12 November 2022 Quarter-finals second leg	Terengganu	3–1	Kuala Lumpur City	Kuala Terengganu
21:00 UTC +8	Ott 22'; Kipré 63'; Sherman 89'	Report	Gallifuoco (yellow card) 24'; Haqimi 45+1'; Akram (yellow card) 61'; Paulo Josué (yellow card) 76'	Stadium: Sultan Mizan Zainal Abidin Stadium; Attendance: 25,355; Referee: Mohd Fusser Mad Sallih

=== AFC Cup ===
==== Group H ====
Pos	Team	Pld	W	D	L	GF	GA	GD	Pts	Qualification	PSM	KLC	TAM
1	(Indonesia) PSM Makassar	2	1	1	0	3	1	+2	4 (Note: Tied on head-to-head results. Overall goal difference used as tiebreaker.)	Zonal semi-finals	—	0–0	—
2	(Malaysia) Kuala Lumpur City (H)	2	1	1	0	2	1	+1	4	Zonal semi-finals	—	—	2–1
3	(Singapore) Tampines Rovers	2	0	0	2	2	5	−3	0		1–3	—	—

Source: AFC
(H) Hosts
Notes:

24 June 2022 Group stage	PSM Makassar (Indonesia)	0–0	(Malaysia) Kuala Lumpur City
	Erwin Gutawa (yellow card) 45'

30 June 2022 Group stage	Kuala Lumpur City (Malaysia)	2–1	(Singapore) Tampines Rovers

10 August 2022 Zonal semi-finals	Viettel (Vietnam)	0–0 (a.e.t.) (5–6 p)	(Malaysia) Kuala Lumpur City

24 August 2022 Zonal finals	Kuala Lumpur City (Malaysia)	5–2	(Indonesia) PSM Makassar

7 September 2022 Inter-zone play-off semi-finals	ATK Mohun Bagan (India)	1–3	(Malaysia) Kuala Lumpur City

5 October 2022 Inter-zone play-off final	Sogdiana Jizzakh (Uzbekistan)	0–0 (a.e.t.) (3–5 p)	(Malaysia) Kuala Lumpur City

22 October 2022 Final	Kuala Lumpur City (Malaysia)	0–3	(Oman) Al-Seeb

== Statistics ==
=== Appearances and goals ===
Players with no appearances not included in the list.

No.	Pos.	Nat.	Name	League		FA Cup		Malaysia Cup		AFC Cup		Piala Sumbangsih		Total	
No.	Pos.	Nat.	Name	Apps	Goals	Apps	Goals	Apps	Goals	Apps	Goals	Apps	Goals	Apps	Goals
1	GK	(Philippines)	Kevin Ray Mendoza	22	0	1	0	3	0	3	0	1	0	30	0
4	DF	(Malaysia)	Kamal Azizi	21	0	1	0	4	0	7	0	1	0	34	0
5	DF	(Malaysia)	Nik Shahrul	0	0	0	0	0	0	0	0	0	0	0	0
6	MF	(Malaysia)	Ryan Lambert	16	4	2	0	2	0	7	0	1	0	28	4
7	MF	(Colombia)	Romel Morales	18	5	1	0	4	2	7	2	0	0	30	9
8	MF	(Malaysia)	Zhafri Yahya	17	4	2	1	4	1	7	0	1	0	31	6
9	DF	(Australia)	Giancarlo Gallifuoco	20	1	2	1	3	0	7	0	1	0	33	2
10	FW	(Malaysia)	Safee Sali	2	0	1	0	0	0	2	0	0	0	5	0
11	FW	(Republic of the Congo)	Kévin Koubemba	8	1	1	1	0	0	1	0	1	0	11	2
12	DF	(Malaysia)	Declan Lambert	20	0	2	0	4	0	7	0	1	0	34	0
14	MF	(Malaysia)	Akram Mahinan	20	1	1	0	4	0	7	0	1	0	33	1
15	DF	(Malaysia)	Azhar Apandi	0	0	1	0	0	0	0	0	0	0	1	0
16	MF	(Malaysia)	Partiban Janasekaran	15	2	1	1	4	0	4	0	1	0	25	3
17	DF	(Malaysia)	Irfan Zakaria	18	0	1	0	3	0	7	0	1	0	30	0
21	MF	(Malaysia)	Kenny Pallraj	12	0	1	0	3	0	6	0	1	0	23	0
22	DF	(Malaysia)	Nik Umar	1	0	1	0	0	0	0	0	0	0	2	0
25	DF	(Malaysia)	Anwar Ibrahim	11	0	1	0	3	0	5	0	0	0	20	0
27	MF	(Malaysia)	Hadin Azman	19	1	2	1	4	0	6	1	1	0	32	3
28	MF	(Brazil)	Paulo Josué	20	6	2	1	4	1	7	5	1	0	34	13
29	MF	(Malaysia)	Arif Shaqirin	10	0	1	0	3	0	3	0	0	0	17	0
30	MF	(Malaysia)	Fakrul Aiman	12	0	2	2	1	0	3	1	0	0	18	3
33	DF	(Malaysia)	Muhammad Faudzi	11	0	1	0	3	0	1	0	0	0	16	0
37	FW	(Malaysia)	Haqimi Azim Rosli	11	1	0	0	4	1	2	0	1	0	18	2
40	DF	(Malaysia)	Ilham Syukri	1	0	0	0	0	0	0	0	0	0	1	0
41	MF	(Malaysia)	Iman Fakrullah	1	0	0	0	0	0	0	0	0	0	1	0
44	GK	(Malaysia)	Azri Ghani	0	0	1	0	1	0	4	0	0	0	6	0
66	DF	(Malaysia)	Nabil Hakim	3	0	1	0	0	0	0	0	1	0	5	0
82	FW	(Ghana)	Jordan Mintah	10	3	0	0	2	0	3	1	0	0	15	4
88	MF	(Malaysia)	Ridhwan Nazri	3	0	1	0	0	0	0	0	0	0	4	0

Last updated: 12 November 2022.
Source: Soccerway.com
