= 2020 Kuala Lumpur FA season =

Kuala Lumpur
2020 season
- President: Khalid Abdul Samad
- Head coach: Nidzam Adzha
- Stadium: Kuala Lumpur Stadium
- Malaysia Premier League: 3rd (promoted)
- Top goalscorer: League: Francis Koné (7); All: Francis Koné (7)
Home colours	Away colours

The 2020 season was Kuala Lumpur's 42nd season in competitive season and the 1st season in the Malaysia Premier League since relegation 2019 season.

== Overview ==
By 14 December 2019, 23 players already signed a contract with the club for 2020 Malaysia Premier League season.

On 26 December 2019, Nidzam Adzha joined Kuala Lumpur as club's new head coach.

On 3 January 2020, Azamat Baimatov joined the club from Dordoi Bishkek.

On 6 January 2020, the club announced Guy Gnabouyou joined the club.

On 31 October 2020, Kuala Lumpur suffered defeat to Kuching in last league match.

== Players ==
=== Current squad ===
As of 14 August 2021

No.	Pos.	Nation	Player
1	GK	MAS	Ernest Wong
3	DF	MAS	Subramaniam Sooryapparad
4	DF	MAS	Syazwan Tajudin
5	DF	MAS	Nik Shahrul
7	DF	KGZ	Azamat Baimatov
8	MF	MAS	Zhafri Yahya
9	FW	TOG	Francis Koné
11	MF	MAS	Dzulfahmi Abdul Hadi
12	DF	MAS	Shukor Adan
13	DF	MAS	Raimi Md. Nor
14	MF	MAS	Akram Mahinan
15	DF	MAS	Fauzan Fauzi
17	DF	MAS	Fandi Othman
18	GK	MAS	Zamir Selamat
19	FW	MAS	Sean Giannelli
20	MF	MAS	Ezrie Shafizie
21	FW	MAS	Azim Rahim

No.	Pos.	Nation	Player
22	GK	MAS	Khatul Anuar
23	MF	MAS	Indra Putra Mahayuddin
25	DF	MAS	Qayyum Marjoni
26	FW	MAS	Shafiq Shaharudin
27	MF	MAS	Hafiz Johar
28	MF	BRA	Paulo Josué (captain)
29	MF	MAS	Alif Samsudin
30	MF	MAS	Fakrul Aiman
32	MF	ARG	Nicolás Dul
39	MF	MAS	Nabil Latpi
40	GK	MAS	Aliff Aiman
41	GK	MAS	Azim Al Amin
42	DF	MAS	Azhar Apandi
43	MF	MAS	Izreen Izwandy
44	MF	MAS	Ridhwan Nazri
45	MF	MAS	Arif Syaqirin
46	FW	MAS	Alif Safwan

== Statistics ==
As of match played 31 October 2020

=== Appearances and goals ===
No.	Pos	Nat	Player	Total		League		Malaysia Cup	
No.	Pos	Nat	Player	Apps	Goals	Apps	Goals	Apps	Goals
4	DF	(Malaysia) MAS	Syazwan Tajudin	1	0	1	0	0	0
5	DF	(Malaysia) MAS	Nik Shahrul	9	0	7+2	0	0	0
7	DF	(Kyrgyzstan) KGZ	Azamat Baimatov	10	0	10	0	0	0
8	MF	(Malaysia) MAS	Zhafri Yahya	7	1	7	1	0	0
9	FW	(Togo) TOG	Francis Koné	11	7	11	7	0	0
11	MF	(Malaysia) MAS	Dzulfahmi Abdul Hadi	6	0	1+5	0	0	0
12	DF	(Malaysia) MAS	Shukor Adan	8	0	8	0	0	0
13	DF	(Malaysia) MAS	Raimi Md. Nor	5	0	2+3	0	0	0
14	MF	(Malaysia) MAS	Akram Mahinan	10	0	9+1	0	0	0
15	DF	(Malaysia) MAS	Fauzan Fauzi	6	0	6	0	0	0
17	DF	(Malaysia) MAS	Fandi Othman	5	0	1+4	0	0	0
18	GK	(Malaysia) MAS	Zamir Selamat	11	0	11	0	0	0
19	FW	(Malaysia) MAS	Sean Giannelli	1	0	0+1	0	0	0
20	MF	(Malaysia) MAS	Ezrie Shafizie	2	0	2	0	0	0
21	FW	(Malaysia) MAS	Azim Rahim	8	2	5+3	2	0	0
23	MF	(Malaysia) MAS	Indra Putra Mahayuddin	11	3	9+2	3	0	0
25	DF	(Malaysia) MAS	Qayyum Marjoni	10	0	8+2	0	0	0
28	MF	(Brazil) BRA	Paulo Josué	10	4	10	4	0	0
30	MF	(Malaysia) MAS	Fakrul Aiman	11	2	9+2	2	0	0
32	MF	(Argentina) ARG	Nicolás Dul	9	1	4+5	1	0	0
39	MF	(Malaysia) MAS	Nabil Latpi	1	0	0+1	0	0	0
43	MF	(Malaysia) MAS	Izreen Izwandy	4	1	0+4	1	0	0
46	FW	(Malaysia) MAS	Alif Safwan	3	0	0+3	0	0	0
Players away from the club on loan:
Players who left Kuala Lumpur during the season:
