= Anwar Ibrahim (footballer) =

Malaysian association football player

Personal information
- Full name: Muhammad Anwar bin Ibrahim
- Date of birth: 10 June 1999 (age 27)
- Place of birth: Kota Bharu, Kelantan, Malaysia
- Height: 1.69 m (5 ft 7 in)
- Position: Right-back

Team information
- Current team: Star City F.C.

Youth career
- Bukit Jalil Sports School
- Felda United U21

Senior career*
Years	Team	Apps	(Gls)
2018–2019	Felda United	18	(0)
2020	Selangor	1	(0)
2020	Selangor II		
2021–2025	Kuala Lumpur City	24	(0)
2025–2026	Negeri Sembilan	9	(0)

International career^{‡}
2017–2018	Malaysia U19	22	(0)
Medal record
AFF U-19 Youth Championship
First place	2018 Indonesia
Second place	2017 Myanmar
- * Club domestic league appearances and goals as of 8 June 2026 ‡ National team caps and goals as of 14 July 2018

Muhammad Anwar bin Ibrahim (born 10 June 1999) is a Malaysian professional footballer who plays as a right-back.

== Club career ==
=== Negeri Sembilan ===
On July 4, 2025, Anwar was announced as a new signing for Negeri Sembilan ahead of the 2025–26 season. At Negeri Sembilan, he trained under newly appointed head coach Nidzam Jamil.

== Career statistics ==
=== Club ===
As of 8 June 2026

Appearances and goals by club, season and competition
Club	Season	League			Cup (Note: Malaysia FA Cup)		League Cup (Note: Includes Malaysia Cup and Malaysia Challenge Cup)		Continental (Note: Includes AFC Cup and Asean Club Championship)		Total	
Club	Season	Division	Apps	Goals	Apps	Goals	Apps	Goals	Apps	Goals	Apps	Goals
Felda United	2018	Malaysia Premier League	6	0	–						6	0
Felda United	2019	Malaysia Super League	12	0	5	0	2	0	–		19	0
Felda United	Total		18	0	5	0	2	0	–		25	0
Selangor	2020	Malaysia Super League	1	0	–						1	0
Selangor	Total		1	0	–						1	0
Selangor II	2020	Malaysia Premier League	1	0	–						1	0
Selangor II	Total		1	0	–						1	0
Kuala Lumpur City	2021	Malaysia Super League	1	0	–		4	0	–		5	0
Kuala Lumpur City	2022	Malaysia Super League	11	0	1	0	3	0	5	0	20	0
Kuala Lumpur City	2023	Malaysia Super League	7	0	2	0	2	0	0	0	11	0
Kuala Lumpur City	2024–25	Malaysia Super League	5	0	0	0	3	0	1	0	9	0
Kuala Lumpur City	Total		24	0	3	0	12	0	6	0	45	0
Negeri Sembilan	2025–26	Malaysia Super League	9	0	1	0	1	0	–		11	0
Career total			53	0	9	0	15	0	6	0	83	0

== Honours ==
=== Club ===
Felda United

- Malaysia Premier League: 2018

Kuala Lumpur City

- Malaysia Cup: 2021
- AFC Cup runner-up: 2022
- Malaysian FA Cup runner-up: 2023

=== International ===
Malaysia U-19

- AFF U-19 Youth Championship: 2018, runner-up 2017
