= Izreen Izwandy =

Malaysian footballer

Personal information
- Full name: Muhammad Izreen bin Izwandy
- Date of birth: 16 July 2000 (age 26)
- Place of birth: Penang, Malaysia
- Height: 1.66 m (5 ft 5 in)
- Position: Midfielder

Team information
- Current team: Kuala Lumpur Rovers
- Number: 16

Youth career
- 2018: Melaka United
- 2019: PKNP
- 2020: Kuala Lumpur City

Senior career*
Years	Team	Apps	(Gls)
2020–2024	Kuala Lumpur City	16	(2)
2024–	Kuala Lumpur Rovers	0	(0)

International career^{‡}
2018–2019	Malaysia U19	0	(0)
- * Club domestic league appearances and goals as of 12 September 2021 ‡ National team caps and goals as of 29 May 2016

Muhammad Izreen bin Izwandy (born 16 July 2000) is a Malaysian footballer who plays as a midfielder for Malaysia A1 Semi-Pro League club Kuala Lumpur Rovers.

== Career statistics ==
=== Club ===
As of match played 30 November 2021

Appearances and goals by club, season and competition
Club	Season	League		Cup		League Cup		Continental		Total	
Club	Season	Apps	Goals	Apps	Goals	Apps	Goals	Apps	Goals	Apps	Goals
Kuala Lumpur City	2020	4	1	0	0	0	0	–		4	1
Kuala Lumpur City	2021	12	1	0	0	1	0	–		13	1
Kuala Lumpur City	2022	0	0	0	0	0	0	–		0	0
Kuala Lumpur City	Total	16	2	0	0	1	0	–		17	2
Career total		0	0	0	0	0	0	–		0	0

== Honour ==
=== Club ===
KL City FC

- Malaysia Cup: 2021
