= Azim Al-Amin =

Malaysian footballer (born 2001)

Personal information
- Full name: Muhammad Azim Al Amin Bin Kamaruddin
- Date of birth: 20 September 2001 (age 25)
- Place of birth: Kuala Lumpur, Malaysia
- Height: 1.76 m (5 ft 9 in)
- Position: Goalkeeper

Team information
- Current team: Selangor

Youth career
- 2015–2018: Bukit Jalil Sports School
- 2019–2020: Kuala Lumpur

Senior career*
Years	Team	Apps	(Gls)
2021–2023	Kuala Lumpur City	3	(0)
2024–	Selangor	5	(0)

International career^{‡}
2023–	Malaysia U23	5	(0)
- * Club domestic league appearances and goals as of 27 May 2026 ‡ National team caps and goals as of 8 February 2024

Muhammad Azim Al Amin Bin Kamaruddin (born 20 September 2001) is a Malaysian professional footballer who plays as a goalkeeper for Malaysia Super League club Selangor.

== Club career ==
=== Kuala Lumpur City ===
Azim began his youth career at Bukit Jalil Sports School before joining FA Kuala Lumpur youth team. Azim passed from the youth and signed his first professional contract with Kuala Lumpur City in 2021.

Throughout the 2021 and 2022 season, Azim becoming the third choice goalkeeper and appeared in the substitute bench for several matches. In the 2023 season, Azim made his debut for the club on 14 April 2023 against Immigration in the second round of the FA Cup, which Kuala Lumpur City won 2–0. Azim made his Super League debut on 4 June 2023, in a 2–1 victory over Sri Pahang at Darul Makmur Stadium.

=== Selangor ===
On 5 February 2024, Azim joined Super League club Selangor on a permanent deal. He made his competitive debut as a substitute on 24 August, in a 6–1 defeat to Johor Darul Ta'zim for the FA Cup final.

== International career ==
=== Youth ===
Azim played youth international football for Malaysia at under-23 levels. He represented the squad at the 2023 Southeast Asian Games tournament. He playing the last game of the group stage against Singapore despite the squad being eliminated early from the tournament. In middle-August 2023, Azim was called up by the Malaysia under-23 team for the 2023 AFF U-23 Championship tournament. He made two appearance against Timor Leste and Thailand. He also included in Malaysia's 23-man squad for the 2024 AFC U-23 Asian Cup qualification.

== Career statistics ==
=== Club ===
As of match played 27 May 2026

Appearances and goals by club, season and competition
Club	Season	League			Cup (Note: Appearances in Malaysia FA Cup)		League Cup (Note: Appearances in Malaysia Cup)		Continental		Other		Total	
Club	Season	Division	Apps	Goals	Apps	Goals	Apps	Goals	Apps	Goals	Apps	Goals	Apps	Goals
Kuala Lumpur City	2021	Malaysia Super League	0	0	0	0	0	0	—				0	0
Kuala Lumpur City	2022	Malaysia Super League	0	0	0	0	0	0	0 (Note: Appearance(s) in AFC Cup)	0	—		0	0
Kuala Lumpur City	2023	Malaysia Super League	3	0	3	0	0	0	—				6	0
Kuala Lumpur City	Total		3	0	3	0	0	0	0	0	0	0	6	0
Selangor	2024–25	Malaysia Super League	4	0	1	0	2	0	5 (Note: Appearance(s) in AFC Champions League Two)	0	1 (Note: Appearance(s) in MFL Challenge Cup)	0	13	0
Selangor	2025–26	Malaysia Super League	1	0	0	0	0	0	0	0	0 (Note: Appearance(s) in ASEAN Club Championship)	0	1	0
Selangor	Total		5	0	1	0	2	0	5	0	1	0	14	0
Career total			8	0	4	0	2	0	5	0	1	0	20	0

== Honours ==
Kuala Lumpur City

- Malaysia Cup: 2021
- Malaysia FA Cup runner-up: 2023

Malaysia U23

- ASEAN U-23 Championship 4th Place: 2023
