= Haqimi Azim =

Malaysian footballer (born 2003)

Personal information
- Full name: Muhammad Haqimi Azim bin Rosli
- Date of birth: 6 January 2003 (age 23)
- Place of birth: Gombak, Selangor, Malaysia
- Height: 1.84 m (6 ft 0 in)
- Position: Forward

Team information
- Current team: Penang (on loan from Johor Darul Ta'zim)
- Number: 37

Senior career*
Years	Team	Apps	(Gls)
2022–2025	Kuala Lumpur City	47	(7)
2025–	Johor Darul Ta'zim	0	(0)
2025–2026	→ Kuala Lumpur City (loan)	5	(0)
2026	→ Terengganu (loan)	5	(0)
2026–	→ Penang (loan)	0	(0)

International career^{‡}
2021–2022	Malaysia U19	4	(0)
2022–	Malaysia U23	4	(3)
2023	Malaysia U22	6	(2)
2022–	Malaysia	12	(1)
Medal record
Men's football
Representing Malaysia
Malaysia U-19
ASEAN U-19 Boys' Championship
Winner	2022
Malaysia U-22
Merlion Cup
Winner	2023
- * Club domestic league appearances and goals as of 21 July 2026 ‡ National team caps and goals as of 21 July 2026

Muhammad Haqimi Azim bin Rosli (born 6 January 2003) is a Malaysian professional footballer who plays as a forward for Malaysia Super League club Penang, on loan from Johor Darul Ta'zim and the Malaysia national team.

== Club career ==
=== Kuala Lumpur City ===
On 16 April 2022, Haqimi made his Malaysia Super League debut for the club in a 2–0 win over Sabah. He scored his first professional league goal against Sri Pahang in a 2–0 win on 11 September 2022. He then scored another goal against Terengganu in a 3–1 loss during the 2022 Malaysia Cup quarter-finals second leg on 12 November 2022.

On 22 August 2024, Haqimi scored the only goal in the match during the 2024–25 ASEAN Club Championship against Philippines club Kaya–Iloilo. He went on to win the FAM Football Awards 'Best Young Player' award at the end of the season.

=== Johor Darul Ta'zim ===
On 21 April 2025, Haqimi agreed to join Johor Darul Ta'zim, and would immediately be loaned back to Kuala Lumpur City for the remainder of the season.

==== Loan to Terengganu ====
On 9 January 2026, Haqimi joined Terengganu on loan until the end of the 2025–25 season.

==== Loan to Penang ====
On 14 July 2026, Haqimi joined Penang on a year-long loan. His arrival will be expected to strengthen Penang's attacking output, with head coach Wan Rohaimi noting that the team's attack had lacked sharpness during the previous season.

== International career ==
=== Youth ===
In July 2022, Haqimi was selected for the squad to face the 2022 AFF U-19 Youth Championship in Indonesia. He successfully led the Malaysia U19 squad to become champions for the second time in the tournament.

In March 2023, Haqimi participated in the 2023 Merlion Cup campaign held in Singapore. He successfully led Malaysia U23 to become the Merlion Cup champion. Malaysia U23 defeated Hong Kong U23 with a score of 2-1 and became champions for the first time in history.

=== Senior ===
Haqimi was called up by Kim Pan-gon for the 2022 AFF Championship and made his debut for Malaysia on 24 December 2022 in a 5–0 win over Laos at the Bukit Jalil National Stadium. He also scored his first international goal during that match.

In July 2026, Haqimi was called up to replace Richard Chin for the 2026 ASEAN Championship.

== Career statistics ==
=== Club ===
As of match played 7 February 2026

Appearances and goals by club, season and competition
Club	Season	League			Cup (Note: Malaysia FA Cup)		League Cup		Continental (Note: Appearance in AFC Cup and ASEAN Club Championship)		Other (Note: Charity Cup)		Total	
Club	Season	Division	Apps	Goals	Apps	Goals	Apps	Goals	Apps	Goals	Apps	Goals	Apps	Goals
Kuala Lumpur City	2022	Malaysia Super League	11	1	0	0	4	1	2	0	1	0	18	2
Kuala Lumpur City	2023	Malaysia Super League	17	1	3	0	4	0	–		0	0	24	1
Kuala Lumpur City	2024–25	Malaysia Super League	19	5	1	1	2	0	5	1	0	0	27	7
Kuala Lumpur City	Total		47	7	4	1	10	1	7	1	1	0	69	10
Kuala Lumpur City (loan)	2025–26	Malaysia Super League	5	0	0	0	0	0	0	0	0	0	5	0
Terengganu (loan)	2025–26	Malaysia Super League	5	0	0	0	4	0	0	0	0	0	9	0
Penang (loan)	2026–27	Malaysia Super League	0	0	0	0	0	0	0	0	0	0	0	0
Career total			57	7	4	1	14	1	7	1	1	0	78	10

=== International ===
As of match played 20 December 2024

Appearances and goals by national team and year
National team	Year	Apps	Goals
Malaysia	2022	1	1
Malaysia	2023	3	0
Malaysia	2024	8	0
Total		12	1

=== International goals ===
No.	Date	Venue	Opponent	Score	Result	Competition
1.	24 December 2022	Bukit Jalil National Stadium, Kuala Lumpur, Malaysia	Laos	4–0	5–0	2022 AFF Championship

== Honours ==
Kuala Lumpur City

- AFC Cup runner-up: 2022
- Malaysia FA Cup runner-up: 2023

Malaysia U22

- Merlion Cup: 2023
- SEA Games : (bronze) bronze 2025

Malaysia

- Pestabola Merdeka: 2024

=== Individual ===
- FAM Football Awards – Best Young Player: 2024–25
