= Giancarlo Gallifuoco =

Australian professional soccer player (born 1994)

Personal information
- Full name: Giancarlo Gallifuoco
- Date of birth: 12 January 1994 (age 32)
- Place of birth: Sydney, Australia
- Height: 1.87 m (6 ft 2 in)
- Position: Centre-back

Team information
- Current team: Kuala Lumpur City
- Number: 9

Youth career
- –2012: Sutherland Sharks
- 2009: NSWIS
- 2009–2011: AIS
- 2012–2014: Tottenham Hotspur
- 2014–2015: Swansea City

Senior career*
Years	Team	Apps	(Gls)
2015–2016	Melbourne Victory	3	(0)
2016–2017	Torquay United	35	(3)
2017–2018	Dover Athletic	45	(5)
2018	Rieti	15	(1)
2019	Western Sydney Wanderers	7	(0)
2019–2020	Central Coast Mariners	10	(1)
2020	Melbourne Victory	4	(0)
2021–	Kuala Lumpur City	100	(3)

International career
	Australia U17	6	(4)
2012	Australia U20	4	(0)
2015	Australia U23	9	(0)
- * Club domestic league appearances and goals as of 7 March 2026

Giancarlo Gallifuoco (born 12 January 1994) is an Australian professional soccer player who plays as a centre-back for Malaysia Super League club Kuala Lumpur City.

== Club career ==
=== Tottenham Hotspur ===
Gallifuoco signed a two and a half year deal with Tottenham Hotspur in February 2012. In his first season with the club he became a regular in the Tottenham under-21 side, alongside fellow Australian Massimo Luongo. He also experienced first-team football in a friendly win over Enfield Town in August 2013.

=== Swansea City ===
In August 2014, Gallifuoco signed a one-year deal with Swansea City. He played predominately with the under-21 side, including victory in the 2014–15 Professional U21 Development League 2. Gallifuoco was released by Swansea at the end of the 2014–15 season.

=== Melbourne Victory ===
Gallifuoco next returned to Australia, joining A-League side Melbourne Victory in September 2015. He made his senior competitive debut one month later, in a win over Hume City in the semifinals of the 2015 FFA Cup. He left the Victory at the end of the season seeking more game time, after only limited first-team opportunities (six appearances across all competitions).

=== Torquay United ===
Gallifuoco then returned to England, signing with National League side Torquay United in August 2016, Gallifuoco played a pivotal role in their survival in the league with 35 starts and 3 goals.

=== Dover Athletic ===
In July 2017 Gallifuoco moved to rival National League side Dover Athletic on a one-season deal. He made his debut in a 1–0 away victory to Hartlepool United on 5 August 2017. He scored his first goal in a 2–0 away victory over Aldershot Town meeting a near-post cross from Nortei Nortey following a short-corner, diverting his header into the far-bottom corner.

=== FC Rieti ===
Gallifuoco joined Serie C outfit F.C. Rieti at the start of the 2018–2019 season, before departing on 23 December 2018 citing personal reasons.

=== Western Sydney Wanderers ===
In March 2019, Gallifuoco returned to Australia, signing with A-League club Western Sydney Wanderers as an injury replacement player. He made his debut for the Wanderers as a late substitute in their 4–1 win over Brisbane Roar FC on 8 March 2019. He was released by the club in May 2019.

=== Central Coast Mariners ===
In May 2019, Gallifuoco was signed by Central Coast Mariners. He was released on the deadline day of the January transfer window.

=== Return to Melbourne Victory ===
On 2 February 2020, Gallifuoco rejoined Melbourne Victory for the remainder of the 2019–20 season.

=== Kuala Lumpur City ===
Gallifuoco joined Malaysia Super League club Kuala Lumpur City in February 2021. He was part of the team that won the 2021 Malaysia Cup.

== International career ==
In May 2025, Gallifuoco revealed that he had begun the naturalisation process in order to represent the Malaysia national team.

== Career statistics ==
As of 2 May 2025

Appearances and goals by club, season and competition
Club	Season	League			National Cup		Other		Total	
Club	Season	Division	Apps	Goals	Apps	Goals	Apps	Goals	Apps	Goals
Melbourne Victory	2015–16	A-League	3	0	1	0	2 (Note: Appearances in AFC Champions League)	0	6	0
Torquay United	2016–17	National League	35	3	2	0	1 (Note: Appearance in FA Trophy)	0	38	3
Dover Athletic	2017–18	National League	45	5	2	0	3 (Note: Appearances in FA Trophy)	0	50	5
Rieti	2018–19	Serie C	15	1	0	0	2 (Note: Appearances in Coppa Italia Serie C)	0	17	1
Western Sydney Wanderers	2018–19	A-League	7	0	0	0	0	0	7	0
Central Coast Mariners	2019–20	A-League	10	1	1	0	0	0	11	1
Melbourne Victory	2019–20	A-League	4	0	0	0	2 (Note: Appearances in AFC Champions League)	0	6	0
Kuala Lumpur City	2021	Malaysia Super League	21	1	10 (Note: Appearances in Malaysia Cup)	0	0	0	31	1
Kuala Lumpur City	2022	Malaysia Super League	20	1	5 (Note: Appearances in Malaysia FA Cup/Malaysia Cup)	1	8 (Note: Appearances in Malaysia Charity Cup/AFC Cup)	0	33	2
Kuala Lumpur City	2023	Malaysia Super League	21	1	9	0	0	0	30	1
Kuala Lumpur City	2024-25	Malaysia Super League	22	0	3	0	5 (Note: Appearances in ASEAN Club Championship)	0	30	0
Kuala Lumpur City	Total		84	3	27	1	13	0	124	4
Career total			203	13	33	1	23	0	259	14

== Honours ==
=== Club ===
Swansea City

- Professional Development League 2: 2014–15

Kuala Lumpur City

- Malaysia FA Cup runners-up: 2023
- Malaysia Cup: 2021
- AFC Cup runners-up: 2022
