= Zhafri Yahya =

Malaysian footballer

Personal information
- Full name: Zhafri bin Yahya
- Date of birth: 25 September 1994 (age 32)
- Place of birth: Klang, Selangor, Malaysia
- Height: 1.69 m (5 ft 7 in)
- Positions: Attacking midfielder; central midfielder

Team information
- Current team: Kuala Lumpur City
- Number: 8

Senior career*
Years	Team	Apps	(Gls)
2012–2013	PKNS	0	(0)
2013–2015	UiTM		
2015	Selangor	0	(0)
2015–	Kuala Lumpur City	163	(20)

International career^{‡}
2022–	Malaysia	1	(0)
Medal record
Men's football
Representing Malaysia
Malaysia
King's Cup
Runner-up	2022
Merdeka Tournament
Winner	2024
- * Club domestic league appearances and goals as of 10 November 2024 ‡ National team caps and goals as of 15 November 2024

Zhafri bin Yahya (born 25 September 1994) is a Malaysian footballer who plays as a midfielder for Malaysia Super League side Kuala Lumpur City and the Malaysia national team.

== Early life ==
He began playing futsal when he was 10 years old, and he spent a lot of time in the amateur leagues at Under-12 and Under-17 levels with Remaja Semangat Pejuang. Later, he was chosen to play for Selangor Under-15 and Under-17 football sides in at the national schools MSSM football tournament.

== Club career ==
=== PKNS ===
After finishing school, he joined PKNS for the Under-21 Piala Presiden.

=== UiTM ===
He then continued his studies at Universiti Teknologi Mara (UiTM) Seri Iskandar, Perak, where he majored in Diploma in Quantity Surveyor. He was given the opportunity to represent UiTM FC in the Malaysia Premier League while studying at UiTM.

=== Selangor ===
He played for the Selangor's Piala Presiden team after completing three years of diploma before being loaned to Kuala Lumpur FA (currently known as Kuala Lumpur City).

=== Kuala Lumpur City ===
Zhafri joined current club Kuala Lumpur City (formerly Kuala Lumpur FA) in December 2015. He was part of the team that won the 2021 Malaysia Cup.

== International career ==
Zhafri was called up for Malaysia national team for the first time by new head coach Kim Pan Gon replacing Darren Lok for the international friendly matches with Philippines and Singapore. He did not play in either match.

Zhafri was then called up again for the 2024 Merdeka Tournament, however he didn't make any appearance for the national team during the tournament.

Zhafri made his international debut on 14 November 2024 in a friendly match against Laos.

== Career statistics ==
=== Club ===
As of 22 October 2022

Appearances and goals by club, season and competition
Club	Season	League		Cup		League Cup		Continental (Note: Appearances in AFC Cup)/ (Note: Appearances in ASEAN Club Championship)		Other		Total	
Club	Season	Apps	Goals	Apps	Goals	Apps	Goals	Apps	Goals	Apps	Goals	Apps	Goals
Kuala Lumpur City
Kuala Lumpur City	2016	16	4	4	0	2	0	–		0	0	22	4
Kuala Lumpur City	2017	22	0	1	0	6	0	–		0	0	29	0
Kuala Lumpur City	2018	19	3	3	0	2	0	–		0	0	24	3
Kuala Lumpur City	2019	18	0	4	0	0	0	–		6 (Note: Appearances in Malaysia Challenge Cup)	0	28	0
Kuala Lumpur City	2020	7	1	0	0	0	0	–		0	0	7	1
Kuala Lumpur City	2021	21	2	0	0	11	3	–		0	0	32	5
Kuala Lumpur City	2022	17	4	2	1	4	1	7	0	1 (Note: Appearances in Malaysia Charity Cup)	0	31	6
Kuala Lumpur City	2023	21	2	3	0	4	1	–		0	0	28	3
Kuala Lumpur City	2024–25	22	4	0	0	3	1	5	0	0	0	30	5
Kuala Lumpur City	Total	163	20	17	1	32	6	12	0	7	0	231	27
Career total		0	0	0	0	0	0	0	0	0	0	0	0

=== International ===
As of match played 14 November 2024

Appearances and goals by national team and year
National team	Year	Apps	Goals
Malaysia	2024	1	0
Total		1	0

== Honours ==
Malaysia

- King's Cup runner-up: 2022
- Merdeka Tournament: 2024

Kuala Lumpur City

- Malaysia Premier League: 2017
- Malaysia Cup: 2021
- AFC Cup runner-up: 2022
- Malaysian Charity Cup runner-up: 2022
- Malaysian FA Cup runner-up: 2023
