= Sean Giannelli =

Malaysian footballer

Personal information
- Full name: Sean Gan Giannelli
- Date of birth: 31 October 1996 (age 30)
- Place of birth: Kuala Lumpur, Malaysia
- Height: 1.74 m (5 ft 9 in)
- Positions: Midfielder; forward

Team information
- Current team: UM-Damansara United
- Number: 11

Youth career
- 2009–2011: Bukit Jalil Sport School
- 2011–2012: Arezzo
- 2013–2014: ATM FA Youth
- 2015: Johor Darul Ta'zim IV

Senior career*
| Years | Team | Apps | (Gls) |
| 2016–2019 | Johor Darul Ta'zim II | | |
| 2020–2021 | Kuala Lumpur City | 5 | (0) |
| 2021 | → UiTM (loan) | 9 | (3) |
| 2022 | Sri Pahang | 13 | (1) |
| 2023–2025 | Kuala Lumpur City | 32 | (4) |
| 2025– | UM-Damansara United | 2 | (0) |
- * Club domestic league appearances and goals as of 27 September 2025

Sean Gan Giannelli (born 31 October 1996) is a Malaysian professional footballer who plays as a midfielder or forwardfor Malaysia A1 Semi-Pro League club UM-Damansara United. Besides Malaysia, he has played in Italy.

== Club career ==
In 2012, Giannelli joined the youth academy of Italian fourth division side Arezzo, where he received interest from the youth academy of Milan, one of the most successful clubs in Italy.

Before the 2020 season, he signed for Malaysian club Kuala Lumpur City after playing for youth academy of Johor Darul Ta'zim.

On 18 May 2021, Giannelli joined Malaysia Super League club UiTM on loan.

In 2022, he signed for Sri Pahang.

In 2023, he returned to Kuala Lumpur City on a 2-year contract.

== Career statistics ==
=== Club ===
As of match played 30 May 2025

Appearances and goals by club, season and competition
| Club | Season | League | | Cup | | League Cup | | Continental | | Total | |
| Club | Season | Apps | Goals | Apps | Goals | Apps | Goals | Apps | Goals | Apps | Goals |
|---|---|---|---|---|---|---|---|---|---|---|---|
| Johor Darul Ta'zim II | 2016 | 2 | 0 | 0 | 0 | 0 | 0 | – | | 2 | 0 |
| Johor Darul Ta'zim II | 2017 | 0 | 0 | 0 | 0 | 0 | 0 | – | | 0 | 0 |
| Johor Darul Ta'zim II | 2018 | 3 | 0 | 0 | 0 | 0 | 0 | – | | 3 | 0 |
| Johor Darul Ta'zim II | 2019 | 2 | 0 | 0 | 0 | 0 | 0 | – | | 2 | 0 |
| Johor Darul Ta'zim II | Total | 7 | 0 | 0 | 0 | 0 | 0 | – | | 7 | 0 |
| Kuala Lumpur City | 2020 | 1 | 0 | 0 | 0 | 0 | 0 | – | | 1 | 0 |
| Kuala Lumpur City | 2021 | 5 | 0 | 0 | 0 | 0 | 0 | – | | 5 | 0 |
| Kuala Lumpur City | Total | 6 | 0 | 0 | 0 | 0 | 0 | – | | 6 | 0 |
| UiTM (loan) | 2021 | 9 | 3 | 0 | 0 | 0 | 0 | – | | 9 | 3 |
| UiTM (loan) | Total | 9 | 3 | 0 | 0 | 0 | 0 | – | | 9 | 3 |
| Sri Pahang | 2022 | 13 | 1 | 1 | 0 | 0 | 0 | – | | 14 | 1 |
| Sri Pahang | Total | 13 | 1 | 1 | 0 | 0 | 0 | – | | 14 | 1 |
| Kuala Lumpur City | 2023 | 15 | 3 | 2 | 0 | 4 | 0 | – | | 21 | 3 |
| Kuala Lumpur City | 2024-25 | 17 | 1 | 1 | 0 | 0 | 0 | 3 | 0 | 21 | 1 |
| Kuala Lumpur City | Total | 32 | 4 | 3 | 0 | 4 | 0 | 3 | 0 | 42 | 4 |
| Career total | | 59 | 4 | 4 | 0 | 4 | 0 | 3 | 0 | 78 | 8 |

== Honours ==
Kuala Lumpur City

- Malaysia FA Cup runner-up: 2023
