= Arif Shaqirin =

Malaysian footballer

Personal information
- Full name: Arif Shaqirin bin Suhaimi
- Date of birth: 13 March 2000 (age 26)
- Place of birth: Terengganu, Malaysia
- Height: 1.78 m (5 ft 10 in)
- Position: Midfielder

Youth career
- 2015–2017: Malaysia Pahang Sports School
- 2018: Kuantan
- 2018–2019: PKNP
- 2020: Kuala Lumpur City

Senior career*
Years	Team	Apps	(Gls)
2021–2025	Kuala Lumpur City	28	(0)
2023	→ Perak (loan)	5	(0)
- * Club domestic league appearances and goals as of 1 June 2025 ‡ National team caps and goals as of 29 May 2016

Arif Shaqirin bin Suhaimi (born 13 March 2000) is a Malaysian footballer who plays as a midfielder.

== International career ==
Arif represented Malaysian at various youth levels.

== Career statistics ==
=== Club ===
As of match played 1 June 2025

Appearances and goals by club, season and competition
Club	Season	League			Cup (Note: Malaysia FA Cup)		League Cup (Note: Includes Malaysia Cup and Malaysia Challenge Cup)		Continental (Note: Includes AFC Cup and Asean Club Championship)		Total	
Club	Season	Division	Apps	Goals	Apps	Goals	Apps	Goals	Apps	Goals	Apps	Goals
Kuala Lumpur City	2021	Malaysia Super League	5	0	0	0	10	0	–		15	0
Kuala Lumpur City	2022	Malaysia Super League	10	0	1	0	3	0	3	0	17	0
Kuala Lumpur City	2023	Malaysia Super League	1	1	0	0	2	0	0		3	0
Kuala Lumpur City	2024-25	Malaysia Super League	12	12	0	0	3	0	3	0	18	0
Kuala Lumpur City	Total		28	1	1	0	18	0	6	0	53	1
Perak (on loan)	2023	Malaysia Super League	5	0	0	0	0	0	–		5	0
Perak (on loan)	Career total		33	1	1	0	18	0	6	0	58	1

== Honour ==
=== Club ===
Kuala Lumpur City

- Malaysia Cup: 2021
- AFC Cup runner-up: 2022

Penang

- MFL Challenge Cup runner-up: 2026
