= Akram Mahinan =

Malaysian footballer

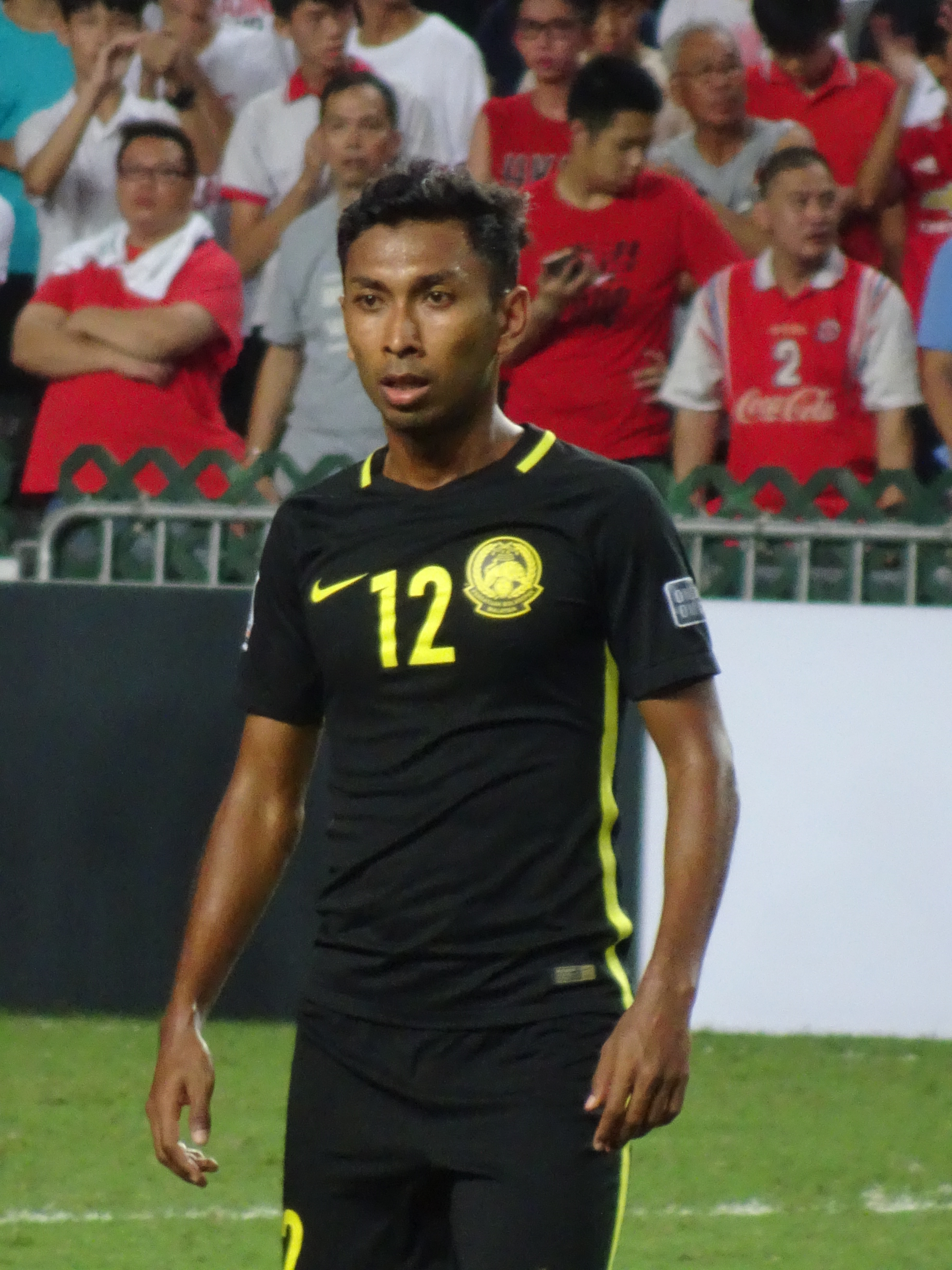

Personal information
- Full name: Muhammad Akram bin Mahinan
- Date of birth: 19 January 1993 (age 33)
- Place of birth: Kulim, Malaysia
- Height: 1.77 m (5 ft 9 1/2 in)
- Position: Midfielder

Team information
- Current team: Negeri Sembilan
- Number: 14

Youth career
- 2006–2010: Bukit Jalil Sports School

Senior career*
Years	Team	Apps	(Gls)
2011–2012	Harimau Muda B	17	(0)
2013	Johor Darul Ta'zim	18	(0)
2014–2015	Johor Darul Ta'zim II	10	(1)
2016	Johor Darul Ta'zim	0	(0)
2017–2018	Kedah Darul Aman	37	(2)
2019	PKNS	20	(0)
2020–2023	Kuala Lumpur City	50	(1)
2024–2026	Terengganu	20	(0)
2026–	Negeri Sembilan	0	(0)

International career^{‡}
2011	Malaysia U-19	4	(3)
2015–2019	Malaysia	26	(0)
Medal record
Men's football
Representing Malaysia
AFF Championship
Runner-up	2018
- * Club domestic league appearances and goals as of 20 April 2025 ‡ National team caps and goals as of 5 October 2019

Muhammad Akram bin Mahinan (born 19 January 1993) is a Malaysian professional footballer who plays for Malaysia Super League club Negeri Sembilan as a midfielder. He is known for his passing range.

== Club career ==
=== Johor Darul Ta'zim ===
In 2013, Akram left Harimau Muda B and signed with Johor Darul Ta'zim. At Johor Akram were given jersey number 31 and he managed to make 18 appearances in his season debut. Akram has been demoted to Johor Darul Ta'zim II for 2014 and 2015 season. He has been promoted to Johor Darul Ta'zim in 2016 but has not made any league appearances, Akram somehow made 2 appearances in 2016 AFC Cup.

=== Kedah ===
On 1 December 2016, Akram signed a one-year contract with Malaysia Super League side Kedah. Akram made his league debut for Kedah in 1–1 draw away match on 20 January 2017. His debut goal for Kedah came in from 2–4 win over Melaka United on 11 July 2017, he scored 1 goal in that match that was held in Hang Jebat Stadium, Melaka.

=== Negeri Sembilan ===
On 14 July 2026, Negeri Sembilan announced the signing of Akram Mahinan from Terengganu for the 2026–27 Malaysia Super League season.

== International career ==
Akram was part of the Malaysia U-19 squad that participated in 2011 AFF U-19 Youth Championship. He scored 3 goals along that tournament.

On 26 March 2015, Akram made his debut for the senior national team in a 6–0 defeat to Oman.

== Career statistics ==
=== Club ===
As of match played 12 September 2021

Appearances and goals by club, season and competition
Club	Season	League			Cup		League Cup		Asia		Total	
Club	Season	Division	Apps	Goals	Apps	Goals	Apps	Goals	Apps	Goals	Apps	Goals
Harimau Muda B	2011	Malaysia Premier League	15	0	0	0	0	0	0	0	15	0
Harimau Muda B	2012	Malaysia Premier League	2	0	1 (Note: Appearance in Singapore Cup)	0	0	0	0	0	3	0
Harimau Muda B	Total		17	0	1	0	0	0	0	0	18	0
Johor Darul Ta'zim	2013	Malaysia Super League	18	0	0	0	0	0	0	0	18	0
Johor Darul Ta'zim	Total		18	0	0	0	0	0	0	0	18	0
Johor Darul Ta'zim II	2014	Malaysia Premier League	0	0	0	0	0	0	0	0	0	0
Johor Darul Ta'zim II	2015	Malaysia Premier League	0	0	0	0	0	0	0	0	0	0
Johor Darul Ta'zim II	Total		0	0	0	0	0	0	0	0	0	0
Johor Darul Ta'zim	2016	Malaysia Super League	0	0	0	0	0	0	0	0	0	0
Johor Darul Ta'zim	Total		0	0	0	0	0	0	0	0	0	0
Kedah Darul Aman	2017	Malaysia Super League	18	1	6	0	6	1	0	0	30	2
Kedah Darul Aman	2018	Malaysia Super League	19	1	2	0	0	0	0	0	21	1
Kedah Darul Aman	Total		37	2	8	0	6	1	0	0	51	3
PKNS	2019	Malaysia Super League	20	0	4	0	1	0	0	0	25	0
PKNS	Total		20	0	4	0	1	0	0	0	25	0
Kuala Lumpur City	2020	Malaysia Super League	10	0	0	0	0	0	0	0	10	0
Kuala Lumpur City	2021	Malaysia Super League	20	0	0	0	0	0	0	0	20	0
Kuala Lumpur City	2022	Malaysia Super League	20	1	1	0	4	0	7	0	32	0
Kuala Lumpur City	2023	Malaysia Super League	13	0	2	0	6	0	0	0	21	0
Kuala Lumpur City	Total		63	1	5	0	10	0	7	0	73	1
Terengganu	2024–25	Malaysia Super League	19	0	3	0	4	0	5	0	31	0
Terengganu	2025–26	Malaysia Super League	17	0	2	0	2	0	0	0	21	0
Terengganu	Total		36	0	5	0	6	0	5	0	52	0
Negeri Sembilan	2026–27	Malaysia Super League	0	0	0	0	0	0	0	0	0	0
Negeri Sembilan	Total		0	0	0	0	0	0	0	0	0	0
Career total			191	3	23	0	23	1	12	0	249	4

=== International ===
As of match played 5 October 2019

Appearances and goals by national team and year
National team	Year	Apps	Goals
Malaysia	2015	1	0
Malaysia	2017	4	0
Malaysia	2018	12	0
Malaysia	2019	9	0
Total		26	0

== Honours ==
=== Club ===
Kuala Lumpur City

- Malaysia Cup: 2021
- AFC Cup runner-up: 2022

Johor Darul Ta'zim

- AFC Cup: 2015
- Malaysia Super League: 2015
- Malaysia FA Cup: 2016

Kedah Darul Aman

- Malaysia FA Cup: 2017
- Malaysia Charity Shield: 2017
- Malaysia Cup runner-up: 2017

Malaysia

- AFF Championship runner-up: 2018
