= Romel Morales =

Malaysian footballer (born 1997)

- Morales training with Terengganu in 2026.

Personal information
- Full name: Romel Oswaldo Morales Ramírez
- Date of birth: 23 August 1997 (age 29)
- Place of birth: Villavicencio, Colombia
- Height: 1.87 m (6 ft 2 in)
- Position: Forward

Team information
- Current team: Terengganu FC (on loan from Johor Darul Ta'zim)
- Number: 19

Youth career
- 2011–2014: River Plate
- 2014–2016: Banfield

Senior career*
Years	Team	Apps	(Gls)
2016–2017	Banfield	1	(0)
2018–2019	PKNS	43	(10)
2020	Melaka United	11	(3)
2021–2023	Kuala Lumpur City	60	(18)
2024–	Johor Darul Ta'zim	19	(10)
2026–	→ Terengganu FC (loan)	3	(1)

International career^{‡}
2024–	Malaysia	15	(4)
- * Club domestic league appearances and goals as of 15 October 2025 ‡ National team caps and goals as of 17 November 2026

Romel Oswaldo Morales Ramírez (born 23 August 1997) is a professional footballer who plays as a forward for Malaysia Super League club Terengganu FC, on loan from Johor Darul Ta'zim. Born in Colombia, he plays for the Malaysia national team.

== Club career ==
Morales started playing football at Churta-Millos football school in Bogotá. He then moved to River Plate at 14 years of age.

=== Banfield ===
In 2014, Morales moved to Argentinian club Banfield. He made his professional debut on 20 March 2016, replacing Walter Erviti in 1–1 draw against River Plate at the Más Monumental Stadium in Buenos Aires.

=== PKNS ===
After six years in Argentina, Morales decided to continue his career in Malaysia, where he signed with PKNS. He made his debut on 3 February 2018, in a 2–2 draw against Terengganu II.

=== Melaka United ===
On 12 November 2019, Melaka United announced the signing of Morales for the following 2020 Malaysia Super League season.

=== Kuala Lumpur City ===
Morales joined Malaysia Super League club Kuala Lumpur City in January 2021. He was part of the team that won the 2021 Malaysia Cup and emerged as the top scorer of the competition with 10 goals. Morales was also part of the squad where the club reached the 2022 AFC Cup Final.

== International career ==
After a five-year stay in the country, on 19 December 2023, Morales was naturalised as a Malaysian citizen. He made his official debut against Jordan during the group stage at the 2023 AFC Asian Cup held in Qatar. He scored his first goal for Malaysia on 25 January 2024 in a 90+14th stoppage time equalizer in the 3–3 draw against South Korea.

On 8 September 2024, Morales scored the only goal of the 2024 Merdeka Tournament final against Lebanon which ended Malaysia's 14 year title drought.

== Career statistics ==
=== Club ===
As of match played 30 August 2025

Appearances and goals by club, season and competition
Club	Season	League			Cup		League Cup		Continental		Total	
Club	Season	Division	Apps	Goals	Apps	Goals	Apps	Goals	Apps	Goals	Apps	Goals
PKNS	2018	Malaysia Super League	21	3	6	2	8	3	–		35	8
PKNS	2019	Malaysia Super League	22	7	3	0	6	2	–		31	9
PKNS	Total		43	10	9	2	14	5	0	0	66	17
Melaka United	2020	Malaysia Super League	11	3	0	0	1	0	–		12	3
Kuala Lumpur City	2021	Malaysia Super League	22	5	0	0	11	10	–		33	15
Kuala Lumpur City	2022	Malaysia Super League	18	5	1	0	4	2	7	2	30	8
Kuala Lumpur City	2023	Malaysia Super League	20	8	1	1	0	0	–		21	9
Kuala Lumpur City	Total		60	18	1	1	15	12	7	2	73	26
Johor Darul Ta'zim	2024–25	Malaysia Super League	19	10	6	5	3	1	0	0	28	16
Johor Darul Ta'zim	2025–26	Malaysia Super League	0	0	1	0	0	0	0	0	1	0
Total			19	10	7	5	3	1	0	0	29	16
Career total			133	38	11	8	33	18	7	2	168	59

=== International ===
As of 14 October 2025

Appearances and goals by national team and year
National team	Year	Apps	Goals
Malaysia	2024	7	2
Malaysia	2025	6	2
Total		13	4

=== International goals ===
==== Senior ====
No.	Date	Venue	Opponent	Score	Result	Competition
1.	25 January 2024	Al Janoub Stadium, Al Wakrah, Qatar	South Korea	3–3	3–3	2023 AFC Asian Cup
2.	8 September 2024	Bukit Jalil National Stadium, Bukit Jalil, Malaysia	Lebanon	1–0	1–0	2024 Pestabola Merdeka
3.	14 October 2025	Bukit Jalil National Stadium, Bukit Jalil, Malaysia	Laos	2–1	5–1	2027 AFC Asian Cup qualification
4.	14 October 2025	Bukit Jalil National Stadium, Bukit Jalil, Malaysia	Laos	3–1	5–1	2027 AFC Asian Cup qualification

== Honours ==
=== Club ===
Kuala Lumpur City

- Malaysia Cup: 2021
- AFC Cup runner-up: 2022

Johor Darul Ta'zim

- Malaysia Super League: 2024–25
- Malaysia FA Cup: 2024
- Malaysia Cup: 2024–25
- Malaysia Charity Shield: 2024, 2025

=== Malaysia ===
- Pestabola Merdeka: 2024

=== Individual ===
- FAM Football Awards – Best Foreign Player: 2021
- Malaysia Cup top scorer: 2021 (10 goals)

== See also ==
- List of Malaysia international footballers born outside Malaysia
