= Azhar Apandi =

Malaysian footballer

Personal information
- Full name: Muhammad Azhar bin Mohd Apandi
- Date of birth: 16 May 1999 (age 27)
- Place of birth: Pekan, Pahang, Malaysia
- Height: 1.73 m (5 ft 8 in)
- Position: Defender

Team information
- Current team: Kuala Lumpur City
- Number: 15

Youth career
- 2018–2020: Kuala Lumpur City

Senior career*
| Years | Team | Apps | (Gls) |
| 2020– | Kuala Lumpur City | 1 | (0) |
| 2021 | → Perak (loan) | 1 | (0) |
| 2021 | → Perak II (loan) | 1 | (0) |

International career
| 2017 | Malaysia U18 | 4 | (0) |
| 2017 | Malaysia U19 | 1 | (0) |
Medal record
AFF U-19 Youth Championship
| Second place | 2017 Myanmar |
- * Club domestic league appearances and goals as of 28 August 2021

Muhammad Azhar bin Mohd Apandi (born 16 May 1999) is a Malaysian professional footballer who plays as a defender for Malaysia Super League club Kuala Lumpur City.

== Personal life ==
Azhar was previously in a relationship with Malaysia national diver Nur Dhabitah Sabri. The relationship ended in 2021.

== Club career ==
=== Perak ===
On 21 August 2021, it was announced that Azhar eligible to play with the club.

On 22 August 2021, Azhar made his debut for Perak II in a 0–3 loss against PDRM FC.

On 28 August 2021, Azhar made his league debut for Perak coming off the bench in a 1–0 loss to Kedah Darul Aman.

== Career statistics ==
=== Club ===
As of match played 29 August 2021

Appearances and goals by club, season and competition
| Club | Season | League | | Cup | | League Cup (Note: Appearances in Malaysia Cup and Malaysia Challenge Cup) | | Continental | | Total | |
| Club | Season | Apps | Goals | Apps | Goals | Apps | Goals | Apps | Goals | Apps | Goals |
|---|---|---|---|---|---|---|---|---|---|---|---|
| Kuala Lumpur City | 2019 | 0 | 0 | 0 | 0 | 2 | 0 | – | | 2 | 0 |
| Kuala Lumpur City | 2020 | 0 | 0 | 0 | 0 | 0 | 0 | – | | 0 | 0 |
| Kuala Lumpur City | 2021 | 1 | 0 | 0 | 0 | 0 | 0 | – | | 1 | 0 |
| Kuala Lumpur City | Total | 1 | 0 | 0 | 0 | 2 | 0 | – | | 3 | 0 |
| Perak (loan) | 2021 | 1 | 0 | 0 | 0 | 0 | 0 | – | | 1 | 0 |
| Perak II (loan) | 2021 | 1 | 0 | 0 | 0 | 0 | 0 | – | | 1 | 0 |
| Perak II (loan) | Total | 0 | 0 | 0 | 0 | 0 | 0 | – | | 0 | 0 |
| Career total | | 0 | 0 | 0 | 0 | 0 | 0 | – | | 0 | 0 |
