= Nik Shahrul =

Malaysian footballer (born 1990)

Nik Shahrul Azim
Personal information
- Birth name: Nik Mohd Shahrul Azim bin Nik Abdul Halim
- Date of birth: 30 December 1990 (age 35)
- Place of birth: Rantau Panjang, Malaysia
- Height: 1.74 m (5 ft 9 in)
- Positions: Right-back; centre-back

Team information
- Current team: NBK Empire F.C.
- Number: 15

Youth career
- 2010–2011: Kelantan U21

Senior career*
Years	Team	Apps	(Gls)
2012–2018	Kelantan	65	(0)
2017	→ Negeri Sembilan (loan)	9	(0)
2018–2019	PKNS	19	(0)
2020–2022	Kuala Lumpur City	26	(0)

International career^{‡}
2010	Malaysia U20	17	(2)
2012–2014	Malaysia U23	14	(1)
Medal record
Malaysia under-23
Merdeka Tournament
Winner	2013
- * Club domestic league appearances and goals ‡ National team caps and goals as of 27 January 2016

Nik Mohd Shahrul Azim bin Nik Abdul Halim (born 30 December 1990) is a Malaysian professional footballer. He is a versatile defender who mainly operates as a right-back and sometimes as a centre-back.

== Club career ==
=== Early career ===
Nik Shahrul began his football career with Kelantan playing for and was the captain of the President's Cup team in 2010.

=== Kelantan ===
In 2012, while Nik Shahrul was playing with Kelantan President’s Cup, Bojan Hodak was spotted his talent to be included in the senior team. His performances have been improving consistently and he has certainly earned his stripes to be part of the Kelantan senior team first XI. Kelantan claim treble winners with Malaysia Cup win against ATM during 2012 season. Even though he was young, he was given the responsibility to take care the defence with Obinna Nwaneri in the 2012 Malaysia Super League season. He was lifted as a hero after denying Indra Putra Mahayuddin attempt for a goal at the last minute that could have made Kelantan lost 3–4 on the first leg of Malaysia FA Cup semi final at Sultan Muhammad IV Stadium. After the match, he said "I would rather be injured than let my team concede another goal."to Astro Arena. On 3 August 2016, he had to rest for at least 2 months after he had an injury during the match against Felda United when he clashed with Syamim Yahya at the end of the first half and was replaced with Noor Hazrul Mustafa.

For 2018 season, Nik Shahrul made his season debut in 1–2 defeat against Melaka United on 3 February 2018.

=== Negeri Sembilan (loan) ===
On 22 May 2017, during the 2017 second transfer window, Nik Shahrul agreed to join Negeri Sembilan on a 6-month loan move from Kelantan until the end of 2017 season. He made his debut on 24 May 2017, playing against Johor Darul Ta'zim II in a 1–1 draw.

=== PKNS ===
On 19 May 2018, Nik Shahrul signed a contract with PKNS for an undisclosed fee. On 23 May, he made his debut for PKNS in a 1–1 draw against Melaka United.

=== Kuala Lumpur City ===
In 2020, Nik Shahrul has joined Kuala Lumpur City after his contract with PKNS expired. He made 9 league appearances during his debut season. On 12 January 2021, Nik Shahrul extended his contract with the club for another season.

== International career ==
He has been called up by Ong Kim Swee for Malaysia national under-23 football team. He also was called up by K. Rajagobal for the friendly matches and 2015 AFC Asian Cup qualification.

== Career statistics ==
=== Club ===
As of match played 12 September 2021

Appearances and goals by club, season and competition
Club	Season	League			National cup		League cup		Continental		Total	
Club	Season	Division	Apps	Goals	Apps	Goals	Apps	Goals	Apps	Goals	Apps	Goals
Kelantan	2012	Malaysia Super League	2	0	—		—		3	0	5	0
Kelantan	2013	Malaysia Super League	16	0	2	0	0	0	6	1	24	1
Kelantan	2014	Malaysia Super League	3	0	0	0	6	0	4	0	13	0
Kelantan	2015	Malaysia Super League	13	0	6	0	5	0	—		24	0
Kelantan	2016	Malaysia Super League	14	0	2	0	3	0	—		19	0
Kelantan	2017	Malaysia Super League	8	0	0	0	4	0	—		12	0
Kelantan	2018	Malaysia Super League	9	0	2	0	0	0	—		11	0
Kelantan	Total		65	0	12	0	14	0	13	1	104	1
Negeri Sembilan (loan)	2017	Malaysia Premier League	9	0	—		4	0	—		13	0
PKNS	2018	Malaysia Super League	11	0	2	0	8	0	—		21	0
PKNS	2019	Malaysia Super League	8	0	0	0	1	0	—		9	0
PKNS	Total		19	0	2	0	9	0	0	0	30	0
Kuala Lumpur City	2020	Malaysia Premier League	9	0	—						9	0
Kuala Lumpur City	2021	Malaysia Super League	17	0	—		0	0	—		17	0
Kuala Lumpur City	Total		26	0	0	0	0	0	0	0	26	0
Career total			119	0	14	0	27	0	13	1	173	1

== Honours ==
Kelantan U21

- Malaysia President Cup: 2010

Kelantan

- Malaysia Super League: 2012
- Malaysia Cup: 2012
- Malaysia FA Cup: 2012, 2013; runner-up 2015
- Malaysia Charity Shield runner-up: 2012, 2013

Malaysia U23

- Merdeka Tournament: 2013
