= Sebastian Avanzini =

Italian footballer (born 1995)

Personal information
- Date of birth: 1 April 1995 (age 31)
- Place of birth: Verona, Italy
- Height: 1.85 m (6 ft 1 in)
- Positions: Midfielder; left-back

Youth career
- Lyngby
- BSF

Senior career*
Years	Team	Apps	(Gls)
2014–2017	BSF		
2017	BK Frem	8	(0)
2017–2018	Skovshoved	26	(1)
2018–2019	Horsens	14	(0)
2020	KÍ Klaksvík		
2020–2021	Hvidovre	23	(2)
2021–2022	Hobro	21	(0)
2023	Kuala Lumpur City	18	(2)
2024–2025	Negeri Sembilan	10	(2)
2025–2026	Kelantan The Real Warriors		
- * Club domestic league appearances and goals as of July 2026

Sebastian Avanzini (born 1 April 1995) is an Italian professional footballer who plays as a midfielder or left-back.

== Career ==
Avanzini started his career at Lyngby Boldklub. He later joined BSF where he quickly became a profile for the team in the Denmark Series. Avanzini then joined Boldklubben Frem in 2017 before moving to Skovshoved IF in the Danish 2nd Division. He had an impressive season in Skovshoved, which was noticed by Bo Henriksen, who decided to bring him to Danish Superliga club AC Horsens in July 2018 on a six-months contract. Three months later, the deal was extended until the summer 2022. On 19 December 2019, it was confirmed that his contract had been terminated.

In January 2020, Avanzini joined KÍ Klaksvík in the Faroe Islands. On 9 May 2020 it was announced that his contract had been terminated by mutual agreement. He returned to Denmark and signed with Danish 1st Division club Hvidovre IF on 1 October 2020.

After only one season at Hvidovre, Avanzini moved to Hobro IK on 13 July 2021, signing a deal until June 2024. His contract was terminated by mutual consent on 10 October 2022, making him a free agent.

In January 2023 he signed for Malaysian club Kuala Lumpur City. He played for Negeri Sembilan in 2024.

On 31 August 2025, Avanzini signed a contract with Malaysia Super League club Kelantan The Real Warriors.
