= Nabil Hakim =

Malaysian footballer

Personal information
- Full name: Nabil Hakim bin Bokhari
- Date of birth: 9 February 1999 (age 27)
- Place of birth: Kuala Lumpur, Malaysia
- Height: 1.69 m (5 ft 6 1/2 in)
- Position: Left-back

Youth career
- 2018–2019: Kuala Lumpur City U21
- 2020: Petaling Jaya City U21

Senior career*
Years	Team	Apps	(Gls)
2020–2021	Petaling Jaya City	5	(0)
2022–2025	Kuala Lumpur City	6	(0)

International career^{‡}
2017–2018	Malaysia U19	9	(0)
2019–2021	Malaysia U22	0	(0)
Medal record
Men's football
Representing Malaysia
AFF U-19 Youth Championship
Winner	2018 Indonesia
Runner-up	2017 Myanmar
- * Club domestic league appearances and goals as of 1 June 2025 ‡ National team caps and goals as of 20 July 2019

Nabil Hakim bin Bokhari (born 9 February 1999) is a Malaysian professional footballer who plays as a left-back.

== Honours ==
Malaysia U19

- AFF U-19 Youth Championship: 2018; runner-up: 2017

Kuala Lumpur City

- AFC Cup: 2022 runner-up
- Malaysian FA Cup: 2023 runner-up
