= Matko Zirdum =

Croatian footballer

Personal information
- Date of birth: 21 July 1998 (age 28)
- Place of birth: Koprivnica, Croatia
- Height: 1.95 m (6 ft 5 in)
- Position: Centre-back

Team information
- Current team: Metaloglobus București
- Number: 30

Youth career
- –2013: Slaven Belupo
- 2013–2016: Dinamo Zagreb
- 2016–2017: Slaven Belupo

Senior career*
Years	Team	Apps	(Gls)
2017–2023	Slaven Belupo	41	(2)
2017	Koprivnica	12	(1)
2017–2018	→ Novigrad (loan)	23	(0)
2021	→ Gorica (loan)	5	(0)
2023	Kuala Lumpur City	14	(2)
2024–2025	Zrinski Osječko	17	(0)
2025–2026	Radnik Križevci	22	(0)
2026–	Metaloglobus București	1	(0)

International career
2019	Croatia U21	2	(0)
- * Club domestic league appearances and goals as of 5 September 2026

Matko Zirdum (born 21 July 1998) is a Croatian professional footballer who plays as a centre-back for Liga II club Metaloglobus București.

== Career ==
=== Youth ===
As a youth player, Zirdum played for Dinamo Zagreb. After that, Zirdum played for the youth academy of Slaven Belupo.

=== Slaven Belupo ===
In 2018, he signed for Slaven Belupo.

=== Gorica ===
In 2020, he signed for Gorica.

=== Slaven Belupo ===
In 2021, he signed for Slaven Belupo. He suffered an injury while playing for Slaven Belupo.

=== Kuala Lumpur City ===
Before the 2023 season, he signed for Kuala Lumpur City.

== Honours ==
Kuala Lumpur City

- Malaysia FA Cup runner-up: 2023
