= Declan Lambert =

Malaysian footballer

Personal information
- Full name: Declan Stephen Lambert Lee Kit Meng
- Date of birth: 21 September 1998 (age 28)
- Place of birth: Kuala Lumpur, Malaysia
- Height: 1.80 m (5 ft 11 in)
- Position: Full-back

Team information
- Current team: Kuching City (on loan from Johor Darul Ta'zim)
- Number: 21

Youth career
- FC Clifton Hill
- Richmond SC

Senior career*
Years	Team	Apps	(Gls)
2016–2017	Richmond	24	(1)
2018	Achilles '29	12	(0)
2018–2021	FC Den Bosch	30	(0)
2022–2024	Kuala Lumpur City	41	(1)
2024–	Johor Darul Ta'zim	0	(0)
2024–2026	→ Kuala Lumpur City (loan)	28	(0)
2026–	→ Kuching City (loan)	0	(0)

International career^{‡}
2022–	Malaysia	5	(0)
- * Club domestic league appearances and goals as of 13 September 2026 ‡ National team caps and goals as of 21 December 2024

Declan Stephen Lambert Lee Kit Meng (born 21 September 1998) is a Malaysian professional footballer who plays as a full-back for Malaysia Super League club Kuching City on loan from Johor Darul Ta'zim and the Malaysia national team.

Lambert was born in Kuala Lumpur, but then moved to Thailand and Australia at a young age. He played youth football with Richmond before starting his senior career with the side. In 2018, Lambert moved to the Netherlands, where he played for lower division sides Achilles '29 and FC Den Bosch. In February 2022, he returned to his birthplace and signed for Kuala Lumpur City. He has also represented Malaysia at international level, having made his debut for the national team in September 2022.

== Early life ==
Lambert was born in Kuala Lumpur to an English father and Malaysian mother. The family then moved to Thailand, where they stayed for six months before relocating again to Melbourne, Australia.

He has a twin brother, Ryan, who is also a professional footballer. The two played together at Clifton Hill, Richmond, Achilles '29 and FC Den Bosch.

== Club career ==
After playing youth football for FC Clifton Hill and Richmond, Lambert made his senior debut for Richmond aged 17.

In 2018, the Lambert twins moved to Europe, and trialed with sides including Sparta Rotterdam and FC Dordrecht. The pair eventually signed for Dutch Tweede Divisie side Achilles '29. However, they left the club after it suffered relegation at the end of the 2017–18 Tweede Divisie.

The twins then moved to Dutch Eerste Divisie side FC Den Bosch in 2018. Their first-team opportunities were initially limited by the arrival of several other foreign players shortly after their signing. However, Lambert made his debut in the 2019–20 Eerste Divisie and by the 2020–21 Eerste Divisie season, was a regular starter for the side.

On 22 February 2022, Lambert signed for Malaysia Super League side Kuala Lumpur City.

== International career ==
Lambert was called up to the Malaysia national team for the first time in September 2022. He made his debut on 22 September in a friendly match against Thailand, scoring one of Malaysia's goals in a penalty shoot-out win.

== Career statistics ==
=== International ===
As of match played 20 December 2024

Appearances and goals by national team and year
National team	Year	Apps	Goals
Malaysia	2022	1	0
Malaysia	2023	0	0
Malaysia	2024	4	0
Total		5	0

== Honours ==
Kuala Lumpur City

- AFC Cup: 2022 runner-up
- Malaysian FA Cup: 2023 runner-up

ASEAN All-Stars

- Maybank Challenge Cup: 2025
