= 2020 Melaka United F.C. season =

3rd season in the Malaysia Super League

Melaka United
2020 season
- President: Datuk Sulaiman Md Ali
- Manager: Yusoff Mahadi
- Head coach: Zainal Abidin Hassan
- Stadium: Hang Jebat Stadium (capacity:40,000)
- Malaysia Super League: 9th
- Malaysia FA Cup: Cancelled
- Malaysia Cup: Cancelled
- Top goalscorer: League: Uche Agba (5); All: Uche Agba (6)
Home colours	Away colours	Third colours

The 2020 season was Melaka United Soccer Association's 96th season in club history and 4th season in the Malaysia Super League.

== Kits ==
- Supplier: al-Ikhsan
- Main sponsors: RedOne
- Other sponsors: Restoran Melayu, Hatten Groups

Home	Away	Alternate	Goalkeeper	Goalkeeper

== Management team ==
Position	Name
Head coach	(Malaysia) Zainal Abidin Hassan
Assistant coaches	(Malaysia) Asri Ninggal
Goalkeeper coach	(Malaysia) Mazlan Wahid
Fitness coach	(Malaysia) Norhuda Hiroshi Razak
Physio	(Slovenia) Vladmir Gramblicka

== Players ==
As of 24 January 2019

No.	Name	Natiosenality	Date of birth (age)	Previous club	Contract since	Contract end
Goalkeepers
1	Solehin Mamat	(Malaysia)	24 March 1996 (age 30)	(Malaysia) Kuala Lumpur FA	2019	
19	Khairul Fahmi	(Malaysia)	7 January 1989 (age 37)	(Malaysia) Kelantan	2018	2020
22	Norazlan Razali	(Malaysia)	19 December 1985 (age 40)	(Malaysia) FELDA United F.C.	2019	
	Izarul Adli	(Malaysia)	17 September 1997 (age 28)	Youth team	2019	
Defenders
3	Nurridzuan Abu Hassan	(Malaysia)	20 April 1992 (age 33)	(Malaysia) Selangor	2020	
5	Annas Rahmat	(Malaysia)	7 November 1994 (age 31)	(Malaysia) Petaling Jaya City FC	2020	
6	Jang Suk-won	(South Korea)	11 August 1989 (age 36)	(South Korea) Seongnam	2019	2020
13	Razman Roslan	(Malaysia)	14 August 1984 (age 41)	(Malaysia) Selangor	2019	2020
14	Mohd Aizulridzwan Razali	(Malaysia)	9 November 1986 (age 39)	(Malaysia) Petaling Jaya City FC	2020	
18	Wan Amirul Afiq	(Malaysia)	18 July 1992 (age 33)	(Malaysia) Felda United	2019	2020
24	Curran Singh Ferns	(Malaysia) (Australia)	6 July 1993 (age 32)	(Australia) Port Melbourne SC	2020	
25	Faris Shah	(Malaysia)	17 April 1995 (age 30)	(Malaysia) Kelantan	2018	2020
26	Khair Jones	(Malaysia) (New Zealand)	29 September 1989 (age 36)	(Malaysia) Kuala Lumpur	2020	
33	Naruphon Putsorn	(Thailand) (England)	21 July 1988 (age 37)	(Thailand) Nakhon Ratchasima F.C.	2020	
61	Akmal Zahir	(Malaysia)	16 February 1994 (age 32)	(Malaysia) UKM F.C.	2020	
	Lee Yong Cheng	(Malaysia)		(Malaysia) SAMB F.C.	2020	
Midfielders
8	Safiq Rahim	(Malaysia)	5 July 1987 (age 38)	(Malaysia) Johor Darul Ta'zim	2019	2020
10	Romel Morales	(Colombia)	23 August 1997 (age 28)	(Malaysia) PKNS FC	2020	2022
11	Syamim Yahya	(Malaysia)	17 May 1990 (age 35)	(Malaysia) Terengganu F.C. I	2020	
15	Khairul Anwar	(Malaysia)	9 October 1990 (age 35)	(Malaysia) Terengganu F.C. I	2020	
16	Saiful Ridzuwan	(Malaysia)	16 March 1992 (age 34)	(Malaysia) Selangor	2019	2020
21	Fakhrullah Rosli	(Malaysia)		(Malaysia) SAMB F.C.	2020	
27	Jasmir Mehat	(Malaysia)	6 February 1994 (age 32)	(Malaysia) SAMB F.C.	2020	
29	Deevan Raj	(Malaysia)	29 October 1994 (age 31)	(Malaysia) PKNP	2019	2020
30	Shyamierul Razmee Jasmi	(Malaysia)	20 March 1998 (age 28)	(Malaysia) SAMB F.C.	2020	
31	Sony Norde	(Haiti)	27 July 1989 (age 36)	(Azerbaijan) Zira FK	2020	
Forwards
7	Uche Agba	(Nigeria)	24 June 1986 (age 39)	(Malaysia) PDRM FA	2020	
20	Faizal Talib	(Malaysia)	28 July 1997 (age 28)	Youth team	2019	
23	Ferris Danial	(Malaysia)	21 August 1992 (age 33)	(Malaysia) Negeri Sembilan	2020	
	Ramzi Haziq	(Malaysia)	23 December 1994 (age 31)	(Malaysia) Johor Darul Ta'zim II	2019	

== Transfers ==
=== Pre-season ===
==== In ====
Pos.	Player	From	Fee	Ref.
GK	(Malaysia) Solehin Mamat	(Malaysia) Kuala Lumpur FA	Free	
GK	(Malaysia) Norazlan Razali	(Malaysia) FELDA United F.C.	Free	
DF	(Malaysia) Annas Rahmat	(Malaysia) Petaling Jaya City FC	Free	
DF	(Malaysia) Mohd Aizulridzwan Razali	(Malaysia) Petaling Jaya City FC	Free	
DF	(Malaysia) (Australia) Curran Singh Ferns	(Australia) Port Melbourne SC	Free	
DF	(Malaysia) (New Zealand) Khair Jones	(Malaysia) Kuala Lumpur FA	Free	
DF	(Malaysia) Akmal Zahir	(Malaysia) UKM F.C.	Free	
DF	(Malaysia) Lee Yong Cheng	(Malaysia) SAMB	Free	
DF	(Thailand) Naruphon Putsorn	(Thailand) Nakhon Ratchasima F.C.	Free	
MF	(Colombia) Romel Morales	(Malaysia) PKNS F.C.	Free	
MF	(Malaysia) Jasmir Mehat	(Malaysia) SAMB	Free	
MF	(Malaysia) Shyamierul Razmee Jasmi	(Malaysia) SAMB	Free	
MF	(Malaysia) Fakhrullah Rosli	(Malaysia) SAMB	Free	
MF	(Malaysia) Nurridzuan Abu Hassan	(Malaysia) Selangor FA	Free	
MF	(Malaysia) Khairul Anwar	(Malaysia) Terengganu F.C. I	Free	
MF	(Malaysia) Syamim Yahya	(Malaysia) Terengganu F.C. I	Free	
MF	(Haiti) Sony Norde	(Azerbaijan) Zira FK	Free	
FW	(Malaysia) Faizal Talib	Promoted	Free	
FW	(Nigeria) Uche Agba	(Malaysia) PDRM FA	Free	
FW	(Malaysia) Ferris Danial	(Malaysia) Negeri Sembilan FA	Free	

==== Out ====
Pos.	Player	To	Fee	Ref.
GK	(Malaysia) Syafizullah Wahab		Free	
GK	(Hong Kong) (Malaysia) Oscar Wong Tse-Yeung		Free	
DF	(Malaysia) Zharif Desa	(Malaysia) Penang FA	Free	
DF	(Malaysia) Raimi Nor	(Malaysia) Kuala Lumpur FA	Free	
DF	(Malaysia) Ubaidullah Rahman		Free	
DF	(Malaysia) Faizal Muhamad		Free	
DF	(Malaysia) Khuzaimi Piee	(Malaysia) UiTM F.C.	Free	
MF	(Malaysia) Kavishkumar Manimaharan		Free	
MF	(Malaysia) Shukor Adan	(Malaysia) Kuala Lumpur FA	Free	
MF	(Malaysia) Nazrin Nawi	(Malaysia) Kelantan FA	Free	
MF	(Malaysia) Gopinathan Ramachandran	(Malaysia) Pahang FA	Free	
MF	(Croatia) Dominik Balić	(Croatia) NK Dugopolje	Free	
MF	(Serbia) Luka Milunović	(Hungary) Debreceni VSC	Free	
MF	(Serbia) Darko Marković	(Iraq) Erbil SC	Free	
FW	(Philippines) Patrick Reichelt	(Thailand) Suphanburi F.C.	Free	
FW	(Ivory Coast) Davy Claude Angan	(Malaysia) Kuala Lumpur Rovers	Free	
FW	(Malaysia) Wan Mohd Syukri		Free	
FW	(Malaysia) Nurshamil Ghani	(Malaysia) Penang FA	Free	
FW	(Brazil) Casagrande	(Malaysia) Penang FA	Season loan	

==== Return From Loan ====
Pos.	Player	From	Fee	Ref.
GK	(Malaysia) Syafizullah Wahab	(Malaysia) SAMB	Loan Return	
MF	(Malaysia) Gopinathan Ramachandra	(Malaysia) PDRM	Loan Return	
MF	(Montenegro) Darko Marković	(Malaysia) Kuala Lumpur	Loan Return	
FW	(Malaysia) Wan Mohd Syukri	(Malaysia) Penang	Loan Return	
FW	(Malaysia) Nurshamil Ghani	(Malaysia) Selangor United	Loan Return	
FW	(Brazil) Casagrande	(Malaysia) Penang	Loan Return	

==== Extension of contract ====
Pos.	Player	Source
GK	(Malaysia) Khairul Fahmi Che Mat	
DF	(Malaysia) Faris Shah Rosli	
DF	(South Korea) Jang Suk-won	
DF	(Malaysia) Wan Amirul Afiq Wan Rahman	
DF	(Malaysia) Razman Roslan	
MF	(Malaysia) Deevan Raj	
MF	(Malaysia) Saiful Ridzuwan Selamat	
MF	(Malaysia) Safiq Rahim	

=== Mid-season ===
==== Out ====
Pos.	Player	To	Fee	Ref.
DF	(Thailand) Naruphon Putsorn		Free	

== Friendlies ==
=== Pre-season ===
18 January 2020 1	Melaka United (Malaysia)	2-0	(Malaysia) UKM F.C.	Krubong, Melaka
	Romel Morales 16'; Jang Suk-won 74'			Stadium: Hang Jebat Stadium; Attendance: 500

23 January 2020 2	Melaka United (Malaysia)	5-0	(Malaysia) Negeri Sembilan FA	Paroi, Negeri Sembilan
	Sony Norde 5' 55' 66'; Uche Agba 11' (pen.) 23'			Stadium: Tuanku Abdul Rahman Stadium; Attendance: 800

9 February 2020 3	Melaka United (Malaysia)	1-0	(Malaysia) Terengganu FC II	Krubong, Melaka
	Sony Norde 76'			Stadium: Hang Jebat Stadium; Attendance: 300

16 February 2020 4	Sarawak United (Malaysia)	1-4	(Malaysia) Melaka United	Kuching, Sarawak
	Patrick Wleh 45'		Uche Agba 10', 25'; Sony Norde 64'; Razman Roslan 90' (pen.)	Stadium: Sarawak State Stadium

=== Tour of Indonesia ===
30 January 2020 Friendly	Bandung United F.C. (Indonesia)	2-3	(Malaysia) Melaka United	Bandung City, West Java, Indonesia
	17' (pen.); 58' (pen.)		Faris Shah 20'; Fakhrullah Rosli 22'; Akmal Zahir 39'	Stadium: Siliwangi Stadium

1 February 2020 Friendly	Persib Bandung (Indonesia)	3-1	(Malaysia) Melaka United	Bandung Regency, West Java, Indonesia
	Castillion 32, 53'; Ghozali Siregar 90+2'		Jang Suk-Won 63'	Stadium: Jalak Harupat Stadium

3 February 2020 Friendly	PSKC Cimahi (Indonesia)	2-2	(Malaysia) Melaka United	Bandung Regency, West Java, Indonesia
			Safiq Rahim 70' 77'	Stadium: Jalak Harupat Stadium

=== Mid-season ===
8 August 2020 1	Melaka United (Malaysia)	3-0	(Malaysia) PDRM FA	Krubong, Melaka
	Uche Agba 26' 51'; Romel Morales 48'			Stadium: Hang Jebat Stadium

14 August 2020 2	Melaka United (Malaysia)	1-0	(Malaysia) UiTM F.C.	Krubong, Melaka
	Uche Agba 57'			Stadium: Hang Jebat Stadium

19 August 2020 3	Melaka United (Malaysia)	4-0	(Malaysia) FELDA United	Krubong, Melaka
	Sony Norde 8' 17'; Uche Agba 11'; Romel Morales 13' (pen.)			Stadium: Hang Jebat Stadium

== Competitions ==
=== Malaysia Super League ===
==== Fixtures and results ====
29 February 2020 1	UiTM FC (Malaysia)	0-2	(Malaysia) Melaka United	Shah Alam
21:00 UTC+8	Rabih Ataya (yellow card) 33'; Arif Anwar (yellow card) 68'	Report	Sony Norde 29'; Romel Morales 90+5' (yellow card) 45+1'; Jang Suk-won (yellow card) 25'	Stadium: UiTM Stadium; Referee: Mohd Salleh Fusser Binmad

6 March 2020 2	Melaka United (Malaysia)	3-1	(Malaysia) PDRM FA	Malacca
21:00 UTC+8	Uche Agba 17'; Safiq Rahim 70'; Wan Amirul Afiq 90+2'; Saiful Ridzuwan (yellow card) 64'}	Report	Antonio German 81'; Khairul Izuan (yellow card) 45+1'}	Stadium: Hang Jebat Stadium; Referee: Zulkarnain Zakaria

11 March 2020 3	Felda United (Malaysia)	3-2	(Malaysia) Melaka United	Jengka
21:00 UTC+8	Nicolas Velez 7' 63'; Khairul Amri 15'; Ezanie Mat Salleh (yellow card) 75'	Report	Uche Agba 81'; Romel Morales 88'; Annas Rahmat (yellow card) 59'	Stadium: Tun Abdul Razak Stadium; Referee: Hamdan Awang

14 March 2020 4	Melaka United (Malaysia)	0-1	(Malaysia) Pahang	Malacca
21:00 UTC+8	Romel Morales (yellow card) 45'; Saiful Ridzuwan (yellow card) 45+4'; Faris Shah Rosli (yellow card) 50'	Report	Dickson Nwakaeme 67'	Stadium: Hang Jebat Stadium; Referee: Razlan Joffri Ali

28 August 2020 5 (Note: The match is postponed following the coronavirus pandemic.)	Perak FA (Malaysia)	0-1	(Malaysia) Melaka United	Ipoh
21:00 UTC+8		Report	Ferris Danial 51'	Stadium: Perak Stadium; Referee: Tarmizi Ibrahim

4 September 2020 6	Melaka United (Malaysia)	1-0	(Malaysia) Terengganu F.C. I	Melaka
21:00 UTC+08:00	Uche Agba 60'; Wan Amirul Afiq (yellow card) 82'; Faris Shah Rosli (yellow card) 85'	Report		Stadium: Hang Jebat Stadium; Referee: Zulkifli Ahmad

11 September 2020 7	Selangor (Malaysia)	1-1	(Malaysia) Melaka United	Shah Alam, Selangor
21:00 UTC+08:00	Sandro 40'; K. Prabakaran (yellow card) 27'; Syahmi Safari (yellow card) 42'; Safuwan Baharudin (yellow card) 45+2'; Brendan Gan (yellow card) 59'	Report	Uche Agba 38'; Wan Amirul Afiq (yellow card) 3'; Saiful Ridzuwan (yellow card) 44'	Stadium: Shah Alam Stadium; Referee: Mohd Nafeez Abdul Wahab

20 September 2020 8	Melaka United (Malaysia)	1-1	(Malaysia) Petaling Jaya City F.C.	Melaka
21:00 UTC+8	Romel Morales 72'; Khairul Anwar (yellow card) 36'; Jang Suk-won (yellow card) 68'	Report	Kogileswaran Raj 90+3'; Washington Brandão (yellow card) 56'; R. Aroon Kumar (yellow card) 90+3'	Stadium: Hang Jebat Stadium; Referee: Nazmi Nasaruddin

27 September 2020 9	Sabah (Malaysia)	3-2	(Malaysia) Melaka United	Kota Kinabalu, Sabah
21:00 UTC+08:00	Dennis Buchening 25' 65'; Rodoljub Paunovic 72' (pen.); Park Tae Su (yellow card) 59'; Maxsius Musa (yellow card) 64'; Petrus Shitembi (yellow card) 90+5'	Report	Uche Agba 16'; Sony Norde 45+3'	Stadium: Likas Stadium; Referee: Fusser Bin Mad Slleh

2 October 2020 10	Kedah (Malaysia)	1-0	(Malaysia) Melaka United	Alor Setar
21:00 UTC+8	Shakir Hamzah 19'	Report		Stadium: Darul Aman Stadium; Referee: Nazim Bin Haji Idris

10 October 2020 11	Melaka United (Malaysia)	0-5	(Malaysia) Johor Darul Ta'zim	Melaka
	Wan Amirul Afiq (yellow card) 18'	Report	Leandro Velazquez 70' (pen.); Syafiq Ahmad 75' (yellow card) 63' Aidil Zafuan 79'; Fernando Rodriguez 85'; Gonzalo Cabrera 90+3'; Fadhli Shas (yellow card) 65'	Stadium: Hang Jebat Stadium; Referee: Noor Azriel bin Baharuddin

==== Table ====
Pos	Team	Pld	W	D	L	GF	GA	GD	Pts	Qualification or relegation
7	Petaling Jaya City	11	3	5	3	17	16	+1	14	
8	Pahang	11	4	2	5	18	18	0	14	
9	Melaka United	11	4	2	5	13	16	−3	11 (Note: Melaka have been docked three points following the decision from FAM.)	
10	Sabah	11	2	3	6	12	24	−12	9	
11	Felda United (R)	11	1	4	6	12	27	−15	7	Relegation to Malaysia Premier League

Source: Malaysian Football League
Rules for classification: 1) Points; 2) Goal difference; 3) Number of goals scored.
(R) Relegated

=== Malaysia FA Cup ===
cancelled

=== Malaysia Cup ===
8 November 2020 Round 1	Selangor	2-1	Melaka United	Melaka
21:00 UTC+8	Ifedayo Olusegun 21'; Sandro 52'	Report	Uche Agba 57'	Stadium: Hang Jebat Stadium; Referee: Hamdan Bin Awang

== Statistics ==
=== Appearances and goals ===
As @ 20 Sept 2020

No.	Pos.	Name	League		FA Cup		Malaysia Cup		Total	
No.	Pos.	Name	Apps	Goals	Apps	Goals	Apps	Goals	Apps	Goals
3	DF	(Malaysia) Nurridzuan Abu Hassan	0(2)	0	0	0	1	0	2	0
5	DF	(Malaysia) Annas Rahmat	5(4)	0	0	0	1	0	9	0
6	DF	(South Korea) Jang Suk-won	9	0	0	0	1	0	9	0
7	FW	(Nigeria) Uche Agba	11	5	0	0	1	1	11	6
8	MF	(Malaysia) Safiq Rahim	7(2)	1	0	0	0(1)	0	9	1
10	MF	(Colombia) Romel Morales	11	3	0	0	1	0	11	3
11	MF	(Malaysia) Syamim Yahya	8(1)	0	0	0	0(1)	0	9	0
13	DF	(Malaysia) Razman Roslan	5(1)	0	0	0	0	0	6	0
15	MF	(Malaysia) Khairul Anwar Shahrudin	6(2)	0	0	0	1	0	8	0
16	MF	(Malaysia) Saiful Ridzuwan	8(2)	0	0	0	1	0	10	0
18	DF	(Malaysia) Wan Amirul Afiq	11	1	0	0	1	0	11	1
19	GK	(Malaysia) Khairul Fahmi	9	0	0	0	1	0	9	0
22	GK	(Malaysia) Norazlan Razali	2	0	0	0	0	0	2	0
23	FW	(Malaysia) Ferris Danial	5(4)	1	0	0	1	0	9	1
24	DF	(Malaysia) (Australia) Curran Singh Ferns	4(1)	0	0	0	0	0	5	0
25	DF	(Malaysia) Faris Shah Rosli	1(7)	0	0	0	0	0	8	0
26	DF	(Malaysia) (New Zealand) Khair Jefri Jones	4	0	0	0	0	0	4	0
27	FW	(Malaysia) Jasmir Mehat	0(2)	0	0	0	0	0	2	0
29	MF	(Malaysia) Deevan Raj	1(5)	0	0	0	0(1)	0	6	0
31	FW	(Haiti) Sony Norde	11	2	0	0	1	0	11	2
Players who have played this season but had left the club or on loan to other club
33	DF	(Thailand) (England) Naruphon Putsorn	3(1)	0	0	0	0	0	4	0
