= 2019 Melaka United season =

3rd season in the Malaysia Super League

Melaka United
2019 season
- President: Adly Zahari
- Manager: Yusoff Mahadi
- Head coach: Zainal Abidin Hassan
- Stadium: Hang Jebat Stadium (capacity:40,000)
- Malaysia Super League: 6th
- Malaysia FA Cup: Second round
- Malaysia Cup: Quarter-finals
- Top goalscorer: League: Patrick Reichelt (10 goals); All: Patrick Reichelt (11 goals)
Home colours	Away colours	Third colours

The 2019 season was Melaka United Soccer Association's 96th season in club history and 3rd season in the Malaysia Super League.

== Kits ==
- Supplier: Warrix Sports
- Main sponsors: Edra & CGN
- Other sponsors: Restoran Melayu, Hatten Groups

Home	Away	Alternate	Goalkeeper	Goalkeeper

== Management team ==
Position	Name
Head coach	(Malaysia) Zainal Abidin Hassan
Assistant coaches	(Malaysia) Nidzam Adzha
Assistant coaches	(Malaysia) Asri Ninggal
Goalkeeper coach	(Malaysia) Mazlan Wahid
Fitness coach	(Malaysia) Norhuda Hiroshi Razak
Physio	(Slovenia) Vladmir Gramblicka

== Players ==
As of 24 January 2019

No.	Name	Nationality	Date of birth (age)	Previous club	Contract since	Contract end
Goalkeepers
1	Syafizullah Wahab	(Malaysia)	6 March 1993 (age 32)	SAMB	2019	
19	Khairul Fahmi	(Malaysia)	7 January 1989 (age 37)	Kelantan	2018	
21	Oscar Wong Tse-Yeung	(Malaysia)	13 May 1995 (age 30)	Hong Kong Rangers	2019	
31	Izarul Adli	(Malaysia)	17 September 1997 (age 28)	Youth team	2019	
Defenders
3	Faizal Muhamad	(Malaysia)	3 March 1989 (age 36)	PDRM	2017	
6	Jang Suk-won	(South Korea)	11 August 1989 (age 36)	Seongnam	2019	
13	Razman Roslan	(Malaysia)	14 August 1984 (age 41)	Selangor	2019	
15	Raimi Nor	(Malaysia)	4 April 1986 (age 39)	Penang	2019	
18	Wan Amirul Afiq	(Malaysia)	18 July 1992 (age 33)	Felda United	2019	
23	Zharif Desa	(Malaysia)	8 July 1992 (age 33)	Penang	2019	
25	Faris Shah	(Malaysia)	17 April 1995 (age 30)	Kelantan	2018	
26	Ubaidullah Rahman	(Malaysia)	1 November 1993 (age 32)	Felcra	2019	
27	Khuzaimi Piee	(Malaysia)	11 November 1993 (age 32)	PKNP	2019	
Midfielders
7	Dominik Balić	(Croatia)	4 May 1996 (age 29)	Dugopolje	2019	
8	Safiq Rahim	(Malaysia)	5 July 1987 (age 38)	Johor Darul Ta'zim	2019	
10	Luka Milunović	(Serbia)	21 December 1992 (age 33)	Voždovac	2019	
12	Shukor Adan	(Malaysia)	24 September 1979 (age 46)	Felda United	2019	
14	Kavishkumar Manimaharan	(Malaysia)	29 August 1997 (age 28)	Tokai FC	2019	
16	Saiful Ridzuwan	(Malaysia)	16 March 1992 (age 33)	Selangor	2019	
20	Nazrin Nawi	(Malaysia)	7 February 1988 (age 37)	Perak	2019	
24	Gopinathan Ramachandran	(Malaysia)	15 December 1989 (age 36)	Johor Darul Ta'zim	2018	
29	Deevan Raj	(Malaysia)	29 October 1994 (age 31)	PKNP	2019	
Forwards
9	Davy Claude Angan	(Ivory Coast)	20 September 1987 (age 38)	Samsunspor	2019	
11	Patrick Reichelt	(Philippines)	15 June 1998 (age 27)	Ceres–Negros	2019	
13	Wan Mohd Syukri	(Malaysia)	10 November 1991 (age 34)	MISC-MIFA	2019	
17	Nurshamil Ghani	(Malaysia)	25 September 1994 (age 31)	Selangor	2015	
22	Ramzi Haziq	(Malaysia)	23 December 1994 (age 31)	Johor Darul Ta'zim II	2019	
32	Faizal Talib	(Malaysia)	28 July 1997 (age 28)	Youth team	2019	

== Transfers ==
=== In ===
1st leg

Pos.	Player	From	Fee	Ref.
GK	(Malaysia) Oscar Wong Tse Yeung	Hong Kong Rangers	Free	
DF	(Malaysia) Khuzaimi Piee	PKNP	Free	
DF	(Malaysia) Wan Amirul Afiq	Felda United	Free	
DF	(Malaysia) Raimi Nor	Penang	Free	
DF	(Malaysia) Zharif Desa	Penang	Free	
DF	(Malaysia) Razman Roslan	Pahang	Free	
DF	(Malaysia) Shukor Adan	Felda United	Free	
DF	(Malaysia) Ubaidullah Rahman	Felcra	Free	
MF	(Malaysia) Nazrin Nawi	Perak	Free	
MF	(Malaysia) M. Kavishkumar	Tokai FC	Free	
MF	(Malaysia) Safiq Rahim	Johor Darul Ta'zim	Free	
MF	(Malaysia) Saiful Ridzuwan	Selangor	Free	
MF	(Malaysia) Gopinathan Ramachandra	Johor Darul Ta'zim	Free	
MF	(Malaysia) Deevan Raj	PKNP	Free	
MF	(Kosovo) Liridon Krasniqi	Kedah	Free	
MF	(Montenegro) Darko Marković	Željezničar Sarajevo	Free	
FW	(Malaysia) Wan Mohd Syukri	MISC-MIFA	Free	
FW	(Philippines) Patrick Reichelt	Ceres–Negros	Free	
FW	(Brazil) Casagrande	Felcra	Free	

2nd leg

Pos.	Player	From	Fee	Ref.
GK	(Malaysia) Solehin Mamat	Kuala Lumpur	Free	
MF	(Croatia) Dominik Balić	Dugopolje	Free	
FW	(Ivory Coast) Davy Angan	Mosta	Free	
MF	(Serbia) Luka Milunović	Sabah	Loan Return	
MF	(Malaysia) Faizal Abu Bakar	Unattached		

=== Out ===
1st leg

Pos.	Player	To	Fee	Ref.
GK	(Malaysia) Fazli Paat	Released		
GK	(Malaysia) Zamir Selamat	Released		
DF	(Malaysia) Shazlan Alias	Released		
DF	(Malaysia) Syawal Norsam	Released		
DF	(Malaysia) G. Puaneswaran	Released		
DF	(France) Steven Thicot	Released		
DF	(Malaysia) Nicholas Swirad	PKNS	Free	
DF	(Malaysia) Azmi Muslim	Perlis	Free	
DF	(Malaysia) Khair Jones	Kuala Lumpur	Free	
MF	(Singapore) Shahdan Sulaiman	Tampines Rovers	Loan Return	
MF	(Malaysia) Chanturu Suppiah	Johor Darul Ta'zim	Loan Return	
MF	(Malaysia) Surendran Ravindran	Released		
MF	(Malaysia) S. Veenod	Petaling Jaya City	Free	
MF	(Malaysia) Gopinathan Ramachandra	Johor Darul Ta'zim	Loan Return	
FW	(Nigeria) Ifedayo Olusegun	Released		
FW	(Malaysia) Akmal Ishak	Released		
FW	(Belarus) Yahor Zubovich	Dinamo Minsk	Free	
FW	(South Korea) Lee Chang-hoon	PDRM	Free	
FW	(Malaysia) Fauzi Roslan	Kelantan	Free	
FW	(Malaysia) S. Sivanesan	Penang	Free	
FW	(Malaysia) Syahrul Azwari	Kedah	Free	
FW	(Malaysia) Fakri Saarani	Released		
FW	(Malaysia) Farderin Kadir	Released		

2nd leg

Pos.	Player	To	Fee	Ref.
MF	(Montenegro) Darko Marković	Kuala Lumpur	On loan	
FW	(Brazil) Casagrande	Penang	On loan	
MF	(Kosovo) Liridon Krasniqi	Released		
FW	(Malaysia) Wan Mohd Syukri	Penang	On loan	
GK	(Malaysia) Syafizullah Wahab	SAMB	On loan	
MF	(Malaysia) Gopinathan Ramachandra	PDRM	On loan	
FW	(Malaysia) Nurshamil Ghani	Selangor United	On loan	

== Friendlies ==
29 December 2018 1	Melaka United (Malaysia)	3–2	(Malaysia) Selangor United	Hang Jebat Stadium
2100 hours	Safiq 3' (pen.); Milunovic 64' (pen.); Marković 87'		Yusaini 34'; Pavlenko 47'

5 January 2019 2	Melaka United (Malaysia)	2–0	(Malaysia) Negeri Sembilan	Hang Jebat Stadium
2100 hours	Milunovic 14'; Safiq 50' (pen.)

9 January 2019 3	Melaka United (Malaysia)	5–1	(Singapore) Warriors	Hang Jebat Stadium
2045 hours	Casagrande 15', 34'; Devan Raj 27'; Milunovic 39'; Nurshamil 53'		Sahil 83'

21 January 2019 4	Melaka United (Malaysia)	3–0	(Malaysia) Sarawak	Hang Jebat Stadium
2100 hours

26 January 2019 5	Melaka United (Malaysia)	3–0	(Malaysia) UiTM	Hang Jebat Stadium
2100 hours

Tour of Vietnam (12 to 15 Jan 2019)

12 January 2018 Friendly	Becamex Bình Dương (Vietnam)	3–3	(Malaysia) Melaka United	Thủ Dầu Một
			Casagrande; Safiq; Milunovic	Stadium: Gò Đậu Stadium

13 January 2018 Friendly	Hồ Chí Minh City (Vietnam)	3–1	(Malaysia) Melaka United	Ho Chi Minh City
			Nazrin pen'	Stadium: Thống Nhất Stadium

15 January 2018 Friendly	Sài Gòn (Vietnam)	1–2	(Malaysia) Melaka United	Ho Chi Minh City
			Casagrande	Stadium: Thống Nhất Stadium

== Competitions ==
=== Overview ===
Competition	Record							
Competition	Pld	W	D	L	GF	GA	GD	Win %
Super League	22	9	6	7	34	30	+4	40.91
FA Cup	1	0	0	1	2	3	−1	0.00
Malaysia Cup	1	1	0	0	3	0	+3	100.00
Total	24	10	6	8	39	33	+6	41.67

Last updated: 4 August 2019
Source: Competitions

=== Malaysia Super League ===
==== Table ====
Pos	Team	Pld	W	D	L	GF	GA	GD	Pts	Qualification or relegation
4	Kedah (Note: Kedah FA qualified for the AFC Champions League preliminary round 2 as Malaysia FA Cup winners.)	22	9	7	6	37	29	+8	34	Qualification for AFC Champions League preliminary round 2
5	Perak	22	8	9	5	36	31	+5	33	
6	Melaka United	22	9	6	7	34	30	+4	33	
7	Terengganu	22	7	9	6	35	37	−2	30	
8	Petaling Jaya City	22	8	2	12	22	29	−7	26	

Source: MFL
Rules for classification: 1) Points; 2) Goal difference; 3) Number of goals scored.

==== Results summary ====
Overall								Home						Away					
Pld	W	D	L	GF	GA	GD	Pts	W	D	L	GF	GA	GD	W	D	L	GF	GA	GD
22	9	6	7	34	30	+4	33	5	4	2	22	13	+9	4	2	5	12	17	−5

Last updated: 20 July 2019.
Source: MSL

==== Fixtures and results ====
2 February 2019 1	Melaka United	2–1	Petaling Jaya City	Krubong
21:00 UTC+8	Marković (yellow card) 12'; Liridon 36'; Casagrande 44'; Ridzuwan (yellow card) 67'	Report	Satish (yellow card) 35'; Barathkumar 58'	Stadium: Hang Jebat Stadium; Referee: Mohd Fairuzi Mat Desa; Man of the Match: Safiq Rahim

9 February 2019 2	PKNS	0–1	Melaka United	Shah Alam
21:00 UTC+8	Rodney (yellow card) 43'; Qayyum (yellow card) 57'; Sherman (yellow card) 82'	Report	Jang Suk-won (yellow card) 16'; Safiq 25' (pen.)	Stadium: Shah Alam Stadium; Referee: Nazmi Nasaruddin; Man of the Match: Patrick Reichelt

16 February 2019 3	Melaka United	1–1	Pahang	Krubong
21:00 UTC+8	Deevan (yellow card) 85'; Safiq 90+1' (pen.); Casagrande (yellow card) 90+2'	Report	Goulon 5'; Safuwan (yellow card) 17'; Azam (yellow card) 72' (yellow-red card) 80'; Nwakaeme (yellow card) 80'; Zé Eduardo (yellow card) 89'	Stadium: Hang Jebat Stadium; Attendance: 19,572; Referee: Wan Mohamad Tarmizi Wan Ibrahim; Man of the Match: Jang Suk-won

23 February 2019 4	Johor Darul Ta'zim	2–1	Melaka United	Larkin
21:00 UTC+8	Cabrera 35' (pen.); Safawi 43'; Hariss (yellow card) 68'	Report	Wan Amirul Afiq (yellow card) 29'; Jang Suk-Won (yellow card) 34'; Reichelt 74'	Stadium: Tan Sri Dato' Haji Hassan Yunos Stadium; Referee: Razlan Joffri Ali

3 March 2019 5	Melaka United	2–0	Kuala Lumpur	Krubong
21:00 UTC+8	Marković 14'; Nazrin 16'; Faris (yellow card) 66'	Report	Arif (yellow card) 33'; Fitri (yellow card) 71'; Paulo Josué (yellow card) 90+1'	Stadium: Hang Jebat Stadium; Referee: Mat Zan Abdul Wahab

9 March 2019 6	Terengganu	3–0	Melaka United	Kuala Terengganu
21:00 UTC+8	Nasrullah 24', (yellow card) 70'; Shaakhmedov 42'; Malik (yellow card) 51'; Syamim 74'	Report	Saiful (yellow card) 45+1'; Faris (yellow card) 54'	Stadium: Sultan Ismail Nasiruddin Shah Stadium; Referee: Zulkarnain Zakaria

29 March 2019 7	Melaka United	0–0	Perak	Krubong
21:00 UTC+8	Jang Suk-won (yellow card) 33'; Marković 14'; Khuzaimi (yellow card) 60'; Reichelt (yellow card) 67'; Shukor (yellow card) 67'	Report	Shahrul (yellow card) 67'; Hakim (yellow card) 88'	Stadium: Hang Jebat Stadium; Referee: Suhaimi Mat Hassan

6 April 2019 8	Melaka United	3–4	Selangor	Krubong
21:00 UTC+8	Reichelt 20', 54', (yellow card) 71'; Shukor (yellow card) 49'; Faris (yellow card) 57'; Marković 71'	Report	Amri 8', 25'; Azreen (yellow card) 42'; Regan (yellow card) 52'; Sean 88', 90+4'	Stadium: Hang Jebat Stadium; Referee: Khirulazuan Kidam

13 April 2019 9	PKNP	1–0	Melaka United	Manjung
21:00 UTC+8	Khuzaimi 66' (o.g.)	Report	Nazrin (yellow card) 69'; Khuzaimi (yellow card) 72'; Jang Suk-won (yellow card) 82'; Casagrande (yellow card) 90+1'	Stadium: Manjung Municipal Council Stadium; Referee: Ku Alauddin Ku Muhammad

21 April 2019 10	Melaka United	1–0	Kedah	Krubong
21:00 UTC+8	Saiful (yellow card) 41'; Casagrande 49'; Fahmi (yellow card) 90+1'	Report	Farhan (yellow card) 56'; Shakir (yellow card) 66'	Stadium: Hang Jebat Stadium; Referee: Mohd Nafeez Abdul Wahab

26 April 2019 11	Felda United	1–1	Melaka United	Jengka
21:00 UTC+8	Ikeda 62', (yellow card) 90'; Watanabe (yellow card) 77'	Report	Reichelt 15'; Faris (yellow card) 28'; Marković (yellow card) 48'; Shukor (yellow card) 60'; Jang Suk-won (yellow card) 62'	Stadium: Tun Abdul Razak Stadium; Referee: Razlan Joffri Ali

4 May 2019 12	Selangor	1–1	Melaka United	Shah Alam
21:00 UTC+8	Syahmi 31'; Sarkunan (yellow card) 45+2'; Sean (yellow card) 45+3'	Report	Afiq (yellow card) 7'; Reichelt 60'	Stadium: Shah Alam Stadium; Referee: Suhaimi Mat Hassan

15 May 2019 13	Melaka United	6–0	Felda United	Krubong
22:00 UTC+8	Reichelt 5'; Safiq 25', (yellow card) 33'; Milunović 36', 53', 89'; Nazrin 36'; Raimi (yellow card) 67'; Afiq (yellow card) 68'	Report	Azim (yellow card) 67'; Chanturu (yellow card) 68'; Zahril (yellow card) 68'; Christie (yellow card) 78'; Thiago Junio (yellow card) 88'	Stadium: Hang Jebat Stadium; Referee: Mat Zan Abdul Wahab

18 May 2019 14	Kedah	2–1	Melaka United	Alor Setar
22:00 UTC+8	Farhan (yellow card) 31'; Baddrol 61', (yellow card) 74'; Jang Suk-won 71' (o.g.)	Report	Milunović 31'; Shukor (yellow card) 45+2'; Khuzaimi (yellow card) 60'; Saiful (yellow card) 85'	Stadium: Darul Aman Stadium; Referee: Suhaimi Mat Hassan

25 May 2019 15	Perak	2–3	Melaka United	Ipoh
22:00 UTC+8	Brendan 18'; Partiban 57'	Report	Nazrin 23'; Safiq (yellow card) 33'; Balić (yellow card) 37'; Reichelt 45+1', 74'; Raimi (yellow card) 56'; Shukor (yellow card) 90'	Stadium: Perak Stadium; Referee: Razlan Joffri Ali

15 June 2019 16	Melaka United	3–3	Terengganu	Krubong
21:00 UTC+8	Angan 17', 49'; Milunović 31'; Reichelt (yellow card) 62'; Balić (yellow card) 72'	Report	Shaakhmedov 41', 73', 82'; Tuck (yellow card) 86'; Nasrullah (yellow card) 89'	Stadium: Hang Jebat Stadium; Referee: Mohd Nafeez Abdul Wahab

19 June 2019 17	Kuala Lumpur	0–1	Melaka United	Bandar Tun Razak
21:00 UTC+8	Shafiq (yellow card) 64'; Irfan (yellow card) 84'; Marković (yellow card) 90+2'	Report	Balić (yellow card) 36'; Reichelt 44'	Stadium: Kuala Lumpur Stadium; Referee: Wan Mohamad Tarmizi

26 June 2019 18	Melaka United	1–2	Johor Darul Ta'zim	Krubong
21:00 UTC+8	Shukor 84'; Raimi (yellow card) 89'	Report	Nazmi 7'; Diogo 27'; Cabrera (yellow card) 90+2'	Stadium: Hang Jebat Stadium; Referee: Nazmi Nasaruddin

6 July 2019 19	Petaling Jaya City	1–2	Melaka United	Petaling Jaya
21:00 UTC+8	Pedro Henrique 14', (yellow card) 80'; Bae Beom-geun (yellow card) 21'; Elizeu (yellow card) 88'	Report	Jang Suk-won (yellow card) 16', (goal) 45+1'; Milunović 37', (yellow card) 90+5'; Balić (yellow card) 57'; Angan (yellow card) 90+2'	Stadium: Petaling Jaya Stadium; Referee: Mohd Fairuzi Mat Desa

9 July 2019 20	Melaka United	2–1	PKNP	Krubong
21:00 UTC+8	Angan 42'; Reichelt 59'; Faris (yellow card) 89'; Fahmi (yellow card) 90+1'	Report	Giancarlo 14'; Pedro Victor (yellow card) 27'; Aguinaldo (yellow card) 61'	Stadium: Hang Jebat Stadium; Referee: S. Logeswaran

16 July 2019 21	Melaka United	1–1	PKNS	Krubong
21:00 UTC+8	Shukor 54'	Report	Swirad (yellow card) 53'; Mahali (yellow card) 78'; Sherman 80'; Gurusamy (yellow card) 90+2'	Stadium: Hang Jebat Stadium; Referee: Mohd Nafeez Abdul Wahab

20 July 2019 22	Pahang	4–1	Melaka United	Kuantan
21:00 UTC+8	Kaimbi 2', 69'; Sumareh 41'; Ramdani 90+1'	Report	Saiful (yellow card) 25'; Milunović 58'	Stadium: Darul Makmur Stadium; Referee: Mohd Hasrol Mohd Amir

=== Malaysia FA Cup ===
3 April 2019 Second round	PKNS	3–2	Melaka United	Shah Alam
21:00 UTC+8	Gurusamy 43' (pen.); Ariff (yellow card) 63'; Vathanaka 67'; Sherman 70'	Report	Saiful (yellow card) 47'; Casagrande 86'; Shukor 90+3'	Stadium: Shah Alam Stadium; Referee: Zulkfifli Ahmad

=== Malaysia Cup ===
==== Group stage ====
Pos	Team	Pld	W	D	L	GF	GA	GD	Pts	Qualification	SEL	MEL	FEL	PDRM
1	Selangor	6	2	4	0	9	6	+3	10	Advance to knockout stage	—	1–1	2–2	1–1
2	Melaka United	6	2	2	2	10	9	+1	8	Advance to knockout stage	0–1	—	1–3	3–1
3	FELDA United	6	2	1	3	10	12	−2	7		0–2	1–3	—	1–0
4	PDRM	6	1	3	2	10	12	−2	6		2–2	2–2	4–3	—

Source: FAM MFL

4 August 2019 1	Melaka United	3–1	PDRM	Krubong
21:00 UTC+8	Nazrin 21', 62'; Reichelt 55'; Jang Suk-won (yellow card) 66'	Report	Lee Chang-hoon 8'	Stadium: Hang Jebat Stadium; Referee: Mohd Nafeez Abdul Wahab

== Statistics ==
=== Appearances and goals ===
Correct as of match played on 4 August 2019

No.	Pos	Nat	Player	Total		League		FA Cup		Malaysia Cup	
No.	Pos	Nat	Player	Apps	Goals	Apps	Goals	Apps	Goals	Apps	Goals
1	GK	(Malaysia) MAS	Solehin Mamat	3	0	2	0	0	0	1	0
3	DF	(Malaysia) MAS	Faizal Muhamad	0	0	0	0	0	0	0	0
6	DF	(South Korea) KOR	Jang Suk-won	21	1	19	1	1	0	1	0
7	MF	(Croatia) CRO	Dominik Balić	8	0	7	0	0	0	0+1	0
8	MF	(Malaysia) MAS	Safiq Rahim	23	3	20+1	3	1	0	1	0
9	FW	(Ivory Coast) CIV	Davy Angan	9	3	8	3	0	0	1	0
10	MF	(Serbia) SRB	Luka Milunović	11	7	10	7	0	0	1	0
11	FW	(Philippines) PHI	Patrick Reichelt	24	11	22	10	1	0	1	1
12	MF	(Malaysia) MAS	Shukor Adan	21	3	16+3	2	1	1	1	0
13	DF	(Malaysia) MAS	Razman Roslan	16	0	9+5	0	1	0	0+1	0
14	FW	(Malaysia) MAS	Kavishkumar Manimaharan	0	0	0	0	0	0	0	0
15	MF	(Malaysia) MAS	Raimi Nor	19	0	16+2	0	1	0	0	0
16	MF	(Malaysia) MAS	Saiful Ridzuwan	21	0	12+7	0	1	0	1	0
18	DF	(Malaysia) MAS	Wan Amirul Afiq	21	0	19	0	1	0	1	0
19	GK	(Malaysia) MAS	Khairul Fahmi	21	0	20	0	1	0	0	0
20	MF	(Malaysia) MAS	Nazrin Nawi	18	5	12+4	3	0+1	0	1	2
21	GK	(Malaysia) MAS	Oscar Wong Tse Yeung	0	0	0	0	0	0	0	0
22	FW	(Malaysia) MAS	Ramzi Haziq	10	0	1+8	0	0	0	0+1	0
23	DF	(Malaysia) MAS	Zharif Desa	0	0	0	0	0	0	0	0
25	DF	(Malaysia) MAS	Faris Shah	19	0	8+10	0	0	0	1	0
26	DF	(Malaysia) MAS	Ubaidullah Rahman	0	0	0	0	0	0	0	0
27	DF	(Malaysia) MAS	Khuzaimi Piee	11	0	5+5	0	0+1	0	0	0
29	MF	(Malaysia) MAS	Deevan Raj	10	0	3+6	0	1	0	0	0
31	GK	(Malaysia) MAS	Izarul Adli	0	0	0	0	0	0	0	0
32	FW	(Malaysia) MAS	Faizal Talib	2	0	0+2	0	0	0	0	0
Players transferred out or on loan during the season
1	GK	(Malaysia) MAS	Syafizullah Wahab	0	0	0	0	0	0	0	0
7	MF	(Montenegro) MNE	Darko Marković	10	2	10	2	0	0	0	0
9	FW	(Brazil) BRA	Casagrande	14	3	13	2	1	1	0	0
10	MF	(Kosovo) KOS	Liridon Krasniqi	6	1	6	1	0	0	0	0
17	FW	(Malaysia) MAS	Nurshamil Ghani	2	0	0+1	0	0+1	0	0	0
24	FW	(Malaysia) MAS	Gopinathan Ramachandra	5	0	3+2	0	0	0	0	0
28	FW	(Malaysia) MAS	Wan Shukri Wan Ahmad	0	0	0	0	0	0	0	0
