= 2021 Kuala Lumpur City F.C. season =

Kuala Lumpur City
2021 season
- President: Annuar Musa
- CEO: Stanley Bernard
- Manager: Bojan Hodak
- Stadium: Kuala Lumpur Stadium
- Malaysia Super League: 6th
- Malaysia Cup: Winners
- Top goalscorer: League: Paulo Josué (10); All: Romel Morales (15)
- Highest home attendance: 0
- Lowest home attendance: 0
- Average home league attendance: 0
Home colours	Away colours

The 2021 season was Kuala Lumpur City's 43rd season in competitive season and the 1st season in the Malaysia Super League since being promoted from 2020 Malaysia Premier League. This is club's first season after rebranded as Kuala Lumpur City Football Club.

== Management team ==
Position	Name
Head coach	(Croatia) Bojan Hodak
Assistant head coach	(Croatia) Nenad Bacina
Technical director	(Malaysia) Nidzam Adzha
Assistant coaches	(Malaysia) Rosle Md Derus
Assistant coaches	(Malaysia) Mohamad Ramli
Goalkeeper coach	(Brazil) Guilherme Almeida
Fitness coach	(Malaysia) Afeeq Aqmal
Physiotherapist	(Sudan) Khidir Abdelakrim Elfdl Ali

== Squad information ==
As of match played 12 September 2021

Appearances in all competitions.
Note: Flags indicate national team as has been defined under FIFA eligibility rules. Players may hold more than one non-FIFA nationality.

No.	Player	Nationality	Position	Date of birth (age)	Signed from	Signed in	Apps.	Goals
Goalkeepers
1	Kevin Ray Mendoza	(Philippines)	GK	29 September 1994 (age 32)	Vendsyssel FF	2021	22	0
22	Khatul Anuar	(Malaysia)	GK	2 April 1997 (age 29)	Youth team	2017	4	0
26	Azim Al-Amin	(Malaysia)	GK		Youth team	2021	0	0
Defenders
2	Wan Amirzafran	(Malaysia)	CB	20 December 1994 (age 31)	Terengganu	2021	2	0
3	Daniel Ting	(Malaysia)	LB	1 December 1994 (age 31)	Unattached	2021	22	1
4	Kamal Azizi	(Malaysia)	RB	28 August 1993 (age 33)	Terengganu	2021	12	0
9	Giancarlo Gallifuoco	(Australia)	CB	12 January 1994 (age 32)	Melbourne Victory	2021	21	1
17	Irfan Zakaria	(Malaysia)	CB / DM	4 June 1995 (age 31)	Kedah Darul Aman	2021	112	2
24	Nik Shahrul	(Malaysia)	CB / RB	30 December 1990 (age 35)	PKNS	2020	26	0
25	Anwar Ibrahim	(Malaysia)	RB	10 June 1999 (age 27)	Selangor II	2021	1	0
Midfielders
6	Ryan Lambert	(Malaysia)	RM / CM	21 September 1998 (age 28)	Den Bosch	2021	7	0
12	Shukor Adan	(Malaysia)	DM / CB	24 September 1979 (age 47)	Melaka United	2021	15	1
14	Akram Mahinan	(Malaysia)	DM	19 January 1993 (age 33)	PKNS	2020	30	0
21	Kenny Pallraj	(Malaysia)	DM	21 April 1993 (age 33)	Perak	2021	7	0
28	Paulo Josué (captain)	(Brazil)	CM / AM	13 March 1989 (age 37)	Votuporanguense	2017	107	37
Forwards
7	Romel Morales	(Colombia)	AM / CF	23 August 1997 (age 29)	Melaka United	2021	22	5
8	Zhafri Yahya	(Malaysia)	LW	25 September 1994 (age 32)	Selangor	2017	103	7
10	Safee Sali (3rd-captain)	(Malaysia)	CF	29 January 1984 (age 42)	Petaling Jaya City	2021	42	21
13	Kyrian Nwabueze	(United States)	CF	11 December 1994 (age 31)	Laçi	2021	1	0
16	Izreen Izwandy	(Malaysia)	LW / RW	16 July 2000 (age 26)	Youth system	2020	16	2
19	Partiban Janasekaran	(Malaysia)	RW	28 November 1992 (age 33)	Perak	2021	9	0
20	Alif Safwan	(Malaysia)	CF	12 February 2000 (age 26)	PKNP	2020	3	0
23	Indra Putra Mahayuddin (vice-captain)	(Malaysia)	LW / RW	2 September 1981 (age 45)	Kelantan	2018	84	18
29	Arif Shaqirin	(Malaysia)	AM	13 March 2000 (age 26)	Youth system	2021	5	0
Also under contract
77	Julian Bechler	(Malaysia)	GK	31 August 2001 (age 25)	Johor Darul Ta'zim II	2021	0	0
Players away on loan
5	Fauzan Fauzi	(Malaysia)	RB	7 January 1995 (age 31)	PDRM	2020	7	0
15	Azhar Apandi	(Malaysia)	CB	16 May 1999 (age 27)	Youth system	2021	1	0
18	Zamir Selamat	(Malaysia)	GK	9 June 1989 (age 37)	Penang	2020	11	0
19	Sean Giannelli	(Malaysia)	AM / CF	31 October 1996 (age 30)	Johor Darul Ta'zim II	2020	6	0
21	Azim Rahim	(Malaysia)	CF	1 January 1997 (age 29)	Felda United	2020	13	2
Left during the season
11	Dominique Da Sylva	(Mauritania)	CF	16 August 1989 (age 37)	Terengganu	2021	6	3

== Transfers ==
=== 1st leg ===
In: Note: Flags indicate national team as defined under FIFA eligibility rules; some limited exceptions apply. Players may hold more than one non-FIFA nationality.

No.	Pos.	Nation	Player
1	GK	PHI	Kevin Ray Mendoza (from (Denmark) Vendsyssel FF)
2	DF	MAS	Wan Amirzafran (from Terengganu)
3	DF	MAS	Daniel Ting
4	DF	MAS	Kamal Azizi (from Terengganu)
5	DF	MAS	Fauzan Fauzi (from Police)
7	MF	COL	Romel Morales (from Melaka United)
9	DF	AUS	Giancarlo Gallifuoco (from (Australia) Melbourne Victory)
10	FW	MAS	Safee Sali (from Petaling Jaya City)

No.	Pos.	Nation	Player
11	FW	MTN	Dominique Da Sylva (from Terengganu)
17	DF	MAS	Irfan Zakaria (from Kedah Darul Aman)
25	DF	MAS	Anwar Ibrahim (from Selangor)
27	MF	MAS	Hadin Azman (from Kedah Darul Aman)
–	GK	GER	Julian Bechler (from Johor Darul Ta'zim III)

Out: Note: Flags indicate national team as defined under FIFA eligibility rules; some limited exceptions apply. Players may hold more than one non-FIFA nationality.

No.	Pos.	Nation	Player
1	GK	MAS	Ernest Wong (to (New Zealand) Manukau United)
3	DF	MAS	S. Subramaniam (to Petaling Jaya City)
4	DF	MAS	Syazwan Tajudin (to Kedah Darul Aman)
7	DF	KGZ	Azamat Baimatov (to (Kyrgyzstan) Alga Bishkek)
9	FW	TOG	Francis Koné
11	FW	MAS	Dzulfahmi Abdul Hadi (to Kelantan)
13	DF	MAS	Raimi Md. Nor
17	DF	MAS	Fandi Othman (to Kedah Darul Aman)

No.	Pos.	Nation	Player
20	MF	MAS	Ezrie Shafizie
25	DF	MAS	Qayyum Marjoni (to Kelantan United)
26	FW	MAS	Shafiq Shaharudin
27	FW	MAS	Hafiz Johar
29	MF	MAS	Alif Samsudin
32	MF	ARG	Nicolás Dul
39	FW	MAS	Nabil Latpi (to Police)

=== 2nd leg ===
In: Note: Flags indicate national team as defined under FIFA eligibility rules; some limited exceptions apply. Players may hold more than one non-FIFA nationality.

No.	Pos.	Nation	Player
–	MF	MAS	Partiban Janasekaran (from Perak)
–	MF	MAS	Ryan Lambert (from (Denmark) Den Bosch)

No.	Pos.	Nation	Player
–	MF	MAS	Kenny Pallraj (from Perak)
–	FW	USA	Kyrian Nwabueze (from (Albania) Laçi)

Out Note: Flags indicate national team as defined under FIFA eligibility rules; some limited exceptions apply. Players may hold more than one non-FIFA nationality.

No.	Pos.	Nation	Player
5	DF	MAS	Fauzan Fauzi (loan to Penang)
11	FW	MTN	Dominique Da Sylva
15	DF	MAS	Azhar Apandi (loan to Perak)

No.	Pos.	Nation	Player
18	GK	MAS	Zamir Selamat (loan to UiTM)
19	FW	MAS	Sean Giannelli (loan to UiTM)
21	FW	MAS	Azim Rahim (loan to Penang)

== Competitions ==
=== Malaysia Super League ===
==== League table ====
Pos	Team	Pld	W	D	L	GF	GA	GD	Pts	Qualification or relegation
4	Terengganu	22	11	5	6	33	20	+13	38	
5	Selangor	22	10	6	6	45	30	+15	36	
6	Kuala Lumpur City	22	8	9	5	27	20	+7	33 (Note: KL City qualified to 2022 AFC Cup as winner of 2021 Malaysia Cup)	Qualification for AFC Cup group stage
7	Petaling Jaya City	22	6	6	10	16	28	−12	24	
8	Melaka United	22	5	9	8	25	31	−6	21 (Note: Melaka have been docked three points based on the following of the decision from FAM (Football Association of Malaysia).)	

Source: Malaysian Football League
Rules for classification: 1) Points; 2) Goal difference; 3) Number of goals scored.

==== Results by round ====
Round	1	2	3	4	5	6	7	8	9	10	11	12	13	14	15	16	17	18	19	20	21	22
Ground	A	H	A	H	A	H	A	H	A	A	H	H	A	H	A	H	A	H	A	H	H	A
Result	L	W	D	W	L	D	D	W	L	L	D	W	D	D	D	D	D	W	W	W	W	L
Position	10	6	7	3	5	6	6	5	6	7	7	6	6	6	6	6	6	6	6	6	6	6

Updated to match(es) played on 12 September 2021. Source: Malaysia Super League
A = Away; H = Home; W = Win; D = Draw; L = Loss

==== Matches ====
Win Draw Loss Fixtures

6 March 2021 1	Penang	1–0	Kuala Lumpur City	George Town
21:00 UTC +8	Rowley (yellow card) 9', (goal) 29'	Report	Indra (yellow card) 36'; Gallifuoco (yellow card) 50'	Stadium: City Stadium; Attendance: 0 Referee: Mohd Hasrol Mohd Amir

10 March 2021 2	Kuala Lumpur City	1–0	UiTM	Cheras
21:00 UTC +8	Da Sylva 14'; Paulo Josué (yellow card) 55'	Report	Khuzaimi (yellow card) 60'; Nirennold (yellow card) 63'	Stadium: Kuala Lumpur Stadium; Attendance: 0 Referee: Suhaizi Shukri

13 March 2021 3	Selangor	1–1	Kuala Lumpur City	Petaling Jaya
21:00 UTC +8	Brendan (yellow card) 72'; Gallifuoco 90' (o.g.)	Report	Indra (yellow card) 17'; Nik Shahrul (yellow card) 24'; Akram (yellow card) 36'; Da Sylva 81'	Stadium: Petaling Jaya Stadium; Attendance: 0 Referee: Nazmi Nasaruddin

17 March 2021 4	Kuala Lumpur City	3–0	Perak	Cheras
21:00 UTC +8	Zhafri (yellow card) 17'; Gallifuoco (yellow card) 23'; Akram (yellow card) 39'; Da Sylva 41'; Morales 46', 66'	Report	Leandro (yellow card) 17'; Shahrul (yellow card) 71'; Danish (yellow card) 82'	Stadium: Kuala Lumpur Stadium; Attendance: 0 Referee: Zamzaidi Katimin

20 March 2021 5	Melaka United	2–1	Kuala Lumpur City	Krubong
21:00 UTC +8	Faris (yellow card) 27'; Alex 51' (pen.), 81' (pen.); Norde (yellow card) 79'; Ott (yellow card) 89'	Report	Morales (yellow card) 45+1'; Paulo Josué (yellow card) 55', (goal) 88'	Stadium: Hang Jebat Stadium; Attendance: 16; Referee: Shahrizan Solihim

3 April 2021 6	Kuala Lumpur City	0–0	Sabah	Cheras
21:00 UTC +8		Report	Rawilson (yellow card) 51'; Madinda (yellow card) 57'; Park (yellow card) 76'	Stadium: Kuala Lumpur Stadium; Attendance: 1,109; Referee: Nafeez Wahab

7 April 2021 7	Petaling Jaya City	2–2	Kuala Lumpur City	Petaling Jaya
21:00 UTC +8	Irfan 50' (o.g.); Kogileswaran 90+4'	Report	Nik Shahrul (yellow card) 38' (yellow-red card) 59'; Paulo Josué 53'; Hadin 57'	Stadium: Petaling Jaya Stadium; Attendance: 275; Referee: Mohd Amirul Izwan Yaacob

10 April 2021 8	Kuala Lumpur City	2–1	Sri Pahang	Cheras
21:00 UTC +8	Paulo Josué 18'; Daniel 70'	Report	Goulon 90+2'	Stadium: Kuala Lumpur Stadium; Attendance: 1,012; Referee: Fitri Maskon

16 April 2021 9	Terengganu	1–0	Kuala Lumpur City	Kuala Nerus
22:00 UTC +8	Faisal (yellow card) 38'; Konaté 88'	Report	Hadin (yellow card) 38'; Kamal (yellow card) 46'	Stadium: Sultan Mizan Zainal Abidin Stadium; Attendance: 2,918; Referee: Zamzaidi Katimin

23 April 2021 10	Kedah Darul Aman	3–2	Kuala Lumpur City	Alor Setar
22:00 UTC +8	Fayadh 71'; Kipré 90+3' (pen.), 90+6'	Report	Paulo Josué 49'; Daniel (yellow card) 55'; Fakrul (yellow card) 66'; Mendoza (yellow card) 67'; Gallifuoco 79'	Stadium: Darul Aman Stadium; Attendance: 1,252; Referee: S. Logeswaran

30 April 2021 11	Kuala Lumpur City	1–1	Johor Darul Ta'zim	Cheras
22:00 UTC +8	Hadin (yellow card) 11'; Morales 45+3'; Kamal (yellow card) 55'	Report	Aidil (yellow card) 18'; Davies (yellow card) 25'; Hariss 55'; Rodríguez (yellow card) 84'	Stadium: Kuala Lumpur Stadium; Attendance: 1,400; Referee: Hamdan Awang

4 May 2021 12	Kuala Lumpur City	3–1	Penang	Cheras
22:00 UTC +8	Kamal (yellow card) 32'; Paulo Josué 35', 52', 88'; Zhafri (yellow card) 46'; Gallifuoco (yellow card) 70'; Hodak (yellow card) 90'	Report	Latiff (yellow card) 26'; Azwan (yellow card) 38'; Danial 64'	Stadium: Kuala Lumpur Stadium; Attendance: 758; Referee: Zamzaidi Katimin

13 May 2021 13	UiTM	1–1	Kuala Lumpur City	Shah Alam
22:00 UTC +8	Faizal (yellow card) 48'; Fané (yellow card) 66'; Kwon 84'	Report	Irfan (yellow card) 79'; Nik Shahrul (yellow card) 82'; Shukor 90+4'	Stadium: UiTM Stadium; Attendance: 0 Referee: Shahrizan Solihim

24 July 2021 14	Kuala Lumpur City	1–1	Selangor	Cheras
21:00 UTC +8	Paulo Josué 40'	Report	Buff 43'; Selvaraj (yellow card) 85'	Stadium: Kuala Lumpur Stadium; Attendance: 0 Referee: Fitri Maskon

27 July 2021 15	Perak	0–0	Kuala Lumpur City	Ipoh
21:00 UTC +8	Poku (yellow card) 40'; Izzuddin (yellow card) 50'	Report	Irfan (yellow card) 13'	Stadium: Perak Stadium; Attendance: 0 Referee: Suhaizi Shukri

31 July 2021 16	Kuala Lumpur City	1–1	Melaka United	Cheras
21:00 UTC +8	Zhafri 53'; Irfan (yellow card) 62'; Partiban (yellow card) 90+6'	Report	Robbat (yellow card) 34'; Akmal (yellow card) 41'; Jang (yellow card) 45+2', (goal) 90+8'	Stadium: Kuala Lumpur Stadium; Attendance: 0 Referee: Mohd Hasrol Mohd Amir

4 August 2021 17	Sabah	1–1	Kuala Lumpur City	Kota Kinabalu
20:15 UTC +8	Mitrevski (yellow card) 58'; Madinda 65'; Maxsius (yellow card) 75'	Report	Randy 22' (o.g.); Nik Shahrul (yellow card) 67'; Kenny (yellow card) 80'	Stadium: Likas Stadium; Attendance: 0 Referee: Tuan Mohd Yaasin Tuan Mohd Hanafiah

7 August 2021 18	Kuala Lumpur City	1–0	Petaling Jaya City	Cheras
21:00 UTC +8	Paulo Josué 31'	Report	Thivandaran (yellow card) 31'; Filemon (yellow card) 41'; Rajes (yellow card) 75'	Stadium: Kuala Lumpur Stadium; Attendance: 0 Referee: Mohd Fusser Mad Sallih

20 August 2021 19	Sri Pahang	0–2	Kuala Lumpur City	Kuantan
21:00 UTC +8	Hidalgo (yellow card) 56'; Yakubu (yellow card) 88'; Goulon (yellow card) 90+3'	Report	Morales 49', (yellow card) 56'; Zhafri 71'; Arif (yellow card) 90+2'	Stadium: Darul Aman Stadium; Attendance: 0 Referee: Muhammad Usaid Jamal

29 August 2021 20	Kuala Lumpur City	1–0	Terengganu	Cheras
21:00 UTC +8	Paulo Josué 29'	Report		Stadium: Kuala Lumpur Stadium; Attendance: 0 Referee: Muhammad Nazmi Nasaruddin

4 September 2021 21	Kuala Lumpur City	2–1	Kedah Darul Aman	Cheras
21:00 UTC +8	Morales 6' (pen.); Safee 26'	Report	Tchétché 34'; Syazwan (yellow card) 41'	Stadium: Kuala Lumpur Stadium; Attendance: 0 Referee: Fitri Maskon

12 September 2021 22	Johor Darul Ta'zim	2–1	Kuala Lumpur City	Iskandar Puteri
21:00 UTC +8	Nazmi 15'; Maurício (yellow card) 31'; Afiq (yellow card) 60'; Nik Shahrul 70' (o.g.)	Report	Izreen 25'; Indra (yellow card) 73'; Kenny (yellow card) 90+3'	Stadium: Sultan Ibrahim Stadium; Attendance: 0 Referee: Muhammad Nazmi Nasaruddin

=== Malaysia Cup ===
==== Group stage ====
The draw for the group stage was held on 15 September 2021.

Pos	Team	Pld	W	D	L	GF	GA	GD	Pts	Qualification	KUL	SUD	PAH	PEN
1	Kuala Lumpur City	6	4	2	0	12	4	+8	14	Quarter-finals	—	4–0	3–1	1–0
2	Sarawak United	6	3	1	2	9	10	−1	10	Quarter-finals	2–2	—	1–0	1–2
3	Sri Pahang	6	2	0	4	11	7	+4	6		0–1	1–2	—	4–0
4	Penang	6	1	1	4	4	15	−11	4		1–1	1–3	0–5	—

Source: MFL, FAM

26 September 2021 1	Kuala Lumpur City	3–1	Sri Pahang	Cheras
21:00 UTC +8	Daniel 19'; Morales 47', 73'	Report	Gallifuoco 79' (o.g.)	Stadium: Kuala Lumpur Stadium; Attendance: 0 Referee: Abdul Rahman Wahab

29 September 2021 2	Penang	1–1	Kuala Lumpur City	George Town
21:00 UTC +8	Azmeer (yellow card) 55'; Boboev 77'; Endrick (yellow card) 87'	Report	Daniel (yellow card) 87'; Morales 90+3'	Stadium: City Stadium; Attendance: 0 Referee: Mohd Hasrol Mohd Amir

30 October 2021 3	Kuala Lumpur City	4–0	Sarawak United	Cheras
21:00 UTC +8	Morales 9', 12'; Partiban 51'; Lambert 59'; Mendoza (yellow card) 71'	Report	Tommy (yellow card) 63'	Stadium: Kuala Lumpur Stadium; Attendance: 358; Referee: Mohamad Zamzaidi Katimin

3 November 2021 4	Sarawak United	2–2	Kuala Lumpur City	Shah Alam
21:00 UTC +8	Agba 22', 40'; Zahril (yellow card) 54'; Azizi (yellow card) 90+2'	Report	Morales 36', 74'; Irfan 81'	Stadium: UiTM Stadium; Attendance: 0 Referee: Mohd Amirul Izwan Yaacob

7 November 2021 5	Kuala Lumpur City	1–0	Penang	Cheras
21:00 UTC +8	Irfan (yellow card) 10'; Kenny (yellow card) 13'; Morales 38' (pen.)	Report	Azmi (yellow card) 28'	Stadium: Kuala Lumpur Stadium; Attendance: 415; Referee: Khirulazuan Kidam

10 November 2021 6	Sri Pahang	0–1	Kuala Lumpur City	Kuantan
21:00 UTC +8	Fazly (yellow card) 79'	Report	Zhafri 83'	Stadium: Darul Makmur Stadium; Attendance: 116; Referee: Tuan Mohd Yaasin Tuan Mohd Hanafiah

==== Knockout stage ====
===== Quarter-finals =====
14 November 2021 First leg	Selangor	0–2	Kuala Lumpur City	Petaling Jaya
21:00 UTC +8	Syahmi (yellow card) 46'	Report	Morales 14'; Akram (yellow card) 23'; Paulo Josué (yellow card) 29'; Hadin 82'	Stadium: MBPJ Stadium; Attendance: 3,146; Referee: Mohd Nafeez Abd Wahab

18 November 2021 Second leg	Kuala Lumpur City	1–0 (3–0 agg.)	Selangor	Cheras
21:00 UTC +8	Morales 50'	Report		Stadium: Kuala Lumpur Stadium; Attendance: 4,115; Referee: Nazmi Nasaruddin

===== Semi-finals =====
22 November 2021 First leg	Kuala Lumpur City	1–1	Melaka United	Cheras
21:00 UTC +8	Kenny (yellow card) 25'; Zhafri 50'	Report	Adriano 8'; Ott (yellow card) 35'; Gomes (yellow card) 44'	Stadium: Kuala Lumpur Stadium; Referee: Mohammad Hasrol Mohd Amir

26 November 2021 Second leg	Melaka United	1–1 (a.e.t.) (2–2 agg.) (3–5 p)	Kuala Lumpur City	Krubong
21:00 UTC +8	Syamim 66'		Partiban 9'	Stadium: Hang Jebat Stadium; Attendance: 17,500; Referee: Mohd Fusser Mad Sallih
	Penalties
	Gomes (penalty missed); Ott (penalty scored); Adriano (penalty scored); Norde (penalty scored)		Hadin (penalty scored); Gallifuoco (penalty scored); Paulo Josué (penalty scored); Morales (penalty scored); Indra Putra (penalty scored)

===== Final =====
30 November 2021 Final	Kuala Lumpur City	2–0	Johor Darul Ta'zim	Kuala Lumpur
21:00 UTC +8	Akram (yellow card) 61'; Zhafri 66'; Paulo Josué 74'; Hadin (yellow card) 83'	Report	Insa (yellow card) 90'	Stadium: Bukit Jalil National Stadium; Attendance: 19,852; Referee: Razlan Joffri Ali

== Statistics ==
=== Appearances and goals ===
Players with no appearances not included in the list.

No.	Pos.	Nat.	Name	League		Malaysia Cup		Total	
No.	Pos.	Nat.	Name	Apps	Goals	Apps	Goals	Apps	Goals
1	GK	(Philippines)	Kevin Ray Mendoza	22	0	11	0	33	0
2	DF	(Malaysia)	Wan Amirzafran	0(2)	0	0(2)	0	4	0
3	DF	(Malaysia)	Daniel Ting	22	1	10(1)	1	33	2
4	DF	(Malaysia)	Kamal Azizi	12	0	10(1)	0	23	0
6	DF	(Malaysia)	Ryan Lambert	5(2)	0	9(2)	1	18	1
7	MF	(Colombia)	Romel Morales	22	5	10(1)	10	33	15
8	MF	(Malaysia)	Zhafri Yahya	20(1)	2	9(2)	3	32	5
9	DF	(Australia)	Giancarlo Gallifuoco	20(1)	1	9(1)	0	31	1
10	FW	(Malaysia)	Safee Sali	2(9)	1	2(1)	0	14	1
12	MF	(Malaysia)	Shukor Adan	0(7)	1	0(1)	0	8	1
13	FW	(United States)	Kyrian Nwabueze	1	0	0	0	1	0
14	MF	(Malaysia)	Akram Mahinan	18(2)	0	10(1)	0	31	0
16	MF	(Malaysia)	Izreen Izwandy	3(9)	1	0(1)	0	13	1
17	DF	(Malaysia)	Irfan Zakaria	20(1)	0	4	0	25	0
19	MF	(Malaysia)	Partiban Janasekaran	6(3)	0	10	2	19	2
21	MF	(Malaysia)	Kenny Pallraj	6(1)	0	10(1)	0	18	0
23	MF	(Malaysia)	Indra Putra Mahayuddin	5(15)	0	1(6)	0	27	0
24	DF	(Malaysia)	Nik Shahrul	13(4)	0	3	0	20	0
25	DF	(Malaysia)	Anwar Ibrahim	0(1)	0	1(3)	0	5	0
27	MF	(Malaysia)	Hadin Azman	14(3)	1	1(6)	1	24	2
28	MF	(Brazil)	Paulo Josué	18(2)	10	8(3)	1	31	11
29	MF	(Malaysia)	Arif Shaqirin	1(4)	0	1(9)	0	15	0
30	MF	(Malaysia)	Fakrul Aiman	6(7)	0	2(3)	0	18	0
Players have left the club
5	DF	(Malaysia)	Fauzan Fauzi	0(1)	0	0	0	1	0
11	FW	(Mauritania)	Dominique Da Sylva	6	3	0	0	6	3
15	DF	(Malaysia)	Azhar Apandi	0(1)	0	0	0	1	0
19	FW	(Malaysia)	Sean Giannelli	0(5)	0	0	0	5	0
21	FW	(Malaysia)	Azim Rahim	0(5)	0	0	0	5	0

Last updated: 30 November 2021.
Source: Soccerway.com

=== Goalscorers ===
Rank	No.	Pos.	Nat.	Name	League	Malaysia Cup	Total
1	7	MF	(Colombia)	Romel Morales	5	10	15
2	28	MF	(Brazil)	Paulo Josué	10	1	11
3	8	MF	(Malaysia)	Zhafri Yahya	2	3	5
4	11	FW	(Mauritania)	Dominique Da Sylva	3	0	3
5	3	DF	(Malaysia)	Daniel Ting	1	1	2
5	19	MF	(Malaysia)	Partiban Janasekaran	0	2	2
5	27	MF	(Malaysia)	Hadin Azman	1	1	2
8	6	DF	(Malaysia)	Ryan Lambert	0	1	1
8	9	DF	(Australia)	Giancarlo Gallifuoco	1	0	1
8	10	FW	(Malaysia)	Safee Sali	1	0	1
8	12	DF	(Malaysia)	Shukor Adan	1	0	1
8	16	MF	(Malaysia)	Izreen Izwandy	1	0	1
Own goals					1	0	1
Totals					27	19	46

Last updated: 30 November 2021.
Source: Soccerway.com

=== Clean sheets ===
Rank	No.	Pos	Nat	Name	League	Malaysia Cup	Total
1	1	GK	(Philippines)	Kevin Ray Mendoza	7	5	12
Total					7	6	13

Last updated: 30 November 2021.
Source: Soccerway.com
