= Hadin Azman =

Malaysian footballer

Personal information
- Full name: Muhammad Hadin bin Azman
- Date of birth: 2 July 1994 (age 32)
- Place of birth: Kuala Lumpur, Malaysia
- Height: 1.74 m (5 ft 8 1/2 in)
- Positions: Forward; attacking midfielder

Team information
- Current team: Kelantan WTS

Youth career
- 2005–2011: CIMB-YFA Bintang Muda
- 2010–2012: Harimau Muda B

Senior career*
Years	Team	Apps	(Gls)
2012	Harimau Muda B	5	(3)
2012	→ Johor Darul Ta'zim II (loan)	0	(0)
2013–2014	Johor Darul Ta'zim	12	(1)
2014	→ Johor Darul Ta'zim II (loan)	1	(0)
2015–2019	Felda United	69	(16)
2020	Kedah Darul Aman	10	(1)
2021–2022	Kuala Lumpur City	36	(2)
2023	Penang	14	(3)
2024–2026	Negeri Sembilan	21	(0)
2026–	Kelantan WTS		

International career^{‡}
2012	Malaysia U-19	1	(0)
2016–	Malaysia	9	(1)
- * Club domestic league appearances and goals as of 8 June 2026 ‡ National team caps and goals as of 5 September 2019

Muhammad Hadin bin Azman (born 2 July 1994) is a Malaysian professional footballer who plays as a forward for Malaysia A1 Semi-Pro League club Kelantan WTS and the Malaysia national team.

He began his youth career at CIMB-YFA Bintang Muda before signing for Harimau Muda B in 2012. He represented Malaysia U-19 since 2012. Known for his pace and trickery, Hadin is widely said as one of the brightest football prodigies of his age in Malaysia.

== Club career ==
=== Harimau Muda B ===
Hadin Azman joined Harimau Muda B in 2012 at the age of 18. Together with the team, he played in the Malaysia Premier League and scored several goals and assists in the process. Due to his creditable performance during the 2012 season of Malaysia Premier League, he has attracted minor interests from PSV Eindhoven and Vitesse Arnhem of Eredivisie before eventually was loaned out to Johor Darul Ta'zim for 2012 Malaysia Cup campaign. He scored 2 goals in 4 games during the tournament.

=== Johor Darul Ta'zim ===
Despite being offered contracts from several clubs, he opted to play for Johor Darul Ta'zim, signing a lucrative 3-year contract deal with the club, under the guidance of team manager, Fandi Ahmad and head coach, Ismail Ibrahim. There are other notable players who signed for the southern side, such as ex-internationals Daniel Güiza, Simone Del Nero, and Malaysia national football team regular starters namely Safiq Rahim, Aidil Zafuan, Norshahrul Idlan and few others. Dubbed as the "Dream Team of Malaysian football", Hadin remains as one of the youngest players in the elite squad.

=== Felda United ===
After his contract with Johor Darul Ta'zim was terminated, Hadin joined Felda United in 2015. He played for the youth and first-team.

=== Kedah Darul Aman ===
On 4 November 2019, Hadin signed a contract with Kedah Darul Aman.

=== Kuala Lumpur City ===
On 25 December 2020, Hadin signed a two-year contract with Kuala Lumpur City.

=== Negeri Sembilan ===
On 8 March 2024, Hadin announced as a new Negeri Sembilan player for 2024–25 season. He was played for Penang before being a marquee signing for Negeri Sembilan. Hadin continue his football career with the club for another year and become vice-captain for 2025–26 season.

== International career ==
Hadin has represented Malaysia at both youth and senior levels. At the youth level, he participated in tournaments such as the Asian Schools Under-18 Tournament and the Hassanal Bolkiah Under-21 Tournament. He was also involved in the RHB Singapore Cup. Hadin made his senior international debut for Malaysia in a match against the Singapore on 7 October 2016.

== Career statistics ==
=== Club ===
As of match played 8 June 2026

Appearances and goals by club, season and competition
Club	Season	League			Cup		League Cup		Continental		Total	
Club	Season	Division	Apps	Goals	Apps	Goals	Apps	Goals	Apps	Goals	Apps	Goals
Harimau Muda B	2012	Malaysia Premier League	0	3	0	0	0	0	—		0	0
Harimau Muda B	Total		0	3	0	0	0	0	0	0	0	0
Johor Darul Ta'zim (loan)	2012	Malaysia Super League	—				4	2	—		4	2
Johor Darul Ta'zim	2013	Malaysia Super League	12	1	0	0	0	0	—		12	1
Johor Darul Ta'zim	2014	Malaysia Super League	0	0	0	0	0	0	—		0	0
Johor Darul Ta'zim	Total		12	1	0	0	4	2	0	0	16	3
Felda United	2015	Malaysia Super League	8	1	0	0	6	0	—		14	1
Felda United	2016	Malaysia Super League	19	6	2	1	5	0	—		26	7
Felda United	2017	Malaysia Super League	15	2	1	0	6	2	6	1	28	5
Felda United	2018	Malaysia Premier League	14	2	4	1	0	0	—		18	3
Felda United	2019	Malaysia Super League	13	5	4	2	4	2	—		21	9
Felda United	Total		69	16	11	4	21	4	6	1	107	25
Kedah Darul Aman	2020	Malaysia Super League	10	1	0	0	1	0	2	2	13	3
Kedah Darul Aman	Total		10	1	0	0	1	0	2	2	13	3
Kuala Lumpur City	2021	Malaysia Super League	17	1	0	0	7	1	0	0	24	2
Kuala Lumpur City	2022	Malaysia Super League	19	1	2	1	4	0	6	1	31	3
Kuala Lumpur City	Total		36	2	2	1	11	1	6	1	55	5
Penang	2023	Malaysia Super League	17	3	1	0	3	1	—		21	4
Penang	Total		17	3	1	0	3	1	0	0	21	4
Negeri Sembilan	2024–25	Malaysia Super League	12	1	1	0	3	2	—		16	3
Negeri Sembilan	2025–26	Malaysia Super League	9	0	1	0	0	0	—		10	0
Negeri Sembilan	Total		21	1	2	0	3	2	0	0	26	3
Career total			192	27	16	5	43	10	14	4	238	46

=== International ===
Hadin represented Malaysia at senior team, and currently representing Malaysia. He first international caps is played against Singapore on 7 October 2016

As of match played 14 November 2016. Malaysia score listed first, score column indicates score after each Hadin Azman goal.

International goals by date, venue, cap, opponent, score, result and competition
No.	Date	Venue	Cap	Opponent	Score	Result	Competition
1	11 October 2016	Shah Alam Stadium, Shah Alam, Malaysia	2	Afghanistan	1–1	1–1	Friendly

As of 5 September 2019

National team	Year	Apps	Goals
Malaysia
Malaysia	2016	5	1
Malaysia	2017	2	0
Malaysia	2019	2	0
Malaysia	Total	9	1

== Honours ==
=== Club ===
Kuala Lumpur City

- Malaysia Cup: 2021
- AFC Cup runner-up: 2022

Felda United

- Malaysia Super League runner-up: 2016
- Malaysian Premier League: 2018

Kedah Darul Aman

- Malaysia Super League runner-up: 2020

=== Individual ===
- CIMB Foundation Sports Scholarship (2011)
- Manchester United Premier Cup Regional Best Player (2009)
- Manchester United Premier Cup Grand Prix Malaysia Best Player (2009)
