= Deevan Raj =

Malaysian footballer

Personal information
- Full name: Deevan Raj a/l Siva Balan
- Date of birth: 29 October 1994 (age 32)
- Place of birth: Perak, Malaysia
- Height: 1.71 m (5 ft 7 in)
- Position: Midfielder

Team information
- Current team: Perak

Youth career
- 2015: Perak

Senior career*
Years	Team	Apps	(Gls)
2016–2018	PKNP	33	(1)
2019–2020	Melaka United	16	(0)
2021–2023	Negeri Sembilan	4	(0)
2023–	Perak	0	(0)
- * Club domestic league appearances and goals as of 28 December 2022

Deevan Raj a/l Siva Balan (born 29 October 1994) is a Malaysian footballer who plays as a midfielder for Malaysia Premier League club Negeri Sembilan.

== Career statistics ==
=== Club ===
As of 10 September 2021

Appearances and goals by club, season and competition
Club	Season	League			Cup		League Cup		Continental		Total	
Club	Season	Division	Apps	Goals	Apps	Goals	Apps	Goals	Apps	Goals	Apps	Goals
PKNP	2017	Malaysia Premier League	21	1	3	0	3	0	—		27	1
PKNP	2018	Malaysia Super League	12	0	2	0	0	0	—		14	0
PKNP	Total		33	1	5	0	3	0	0	0	41	1
Melaka United	2019	Malaysia Super League	10	0	1	0	—				11	0
Melaka United	2020	Malaysia Super League	6	0	—						6	0
Melaka United	Total		16	0	0	0	0	0	0	0	17	0
Negeri Sembilan	2021	Malaysia Super League	4	0	0	0	—				4	0
Negeri Sembilan	Total		4	0	0	0	0	0	0	0	4	0
Career total			0	0	0	0	0	0	0	0	0	0
