= Kevin Ray Mendoza =

Filipino footballer (born 1994)

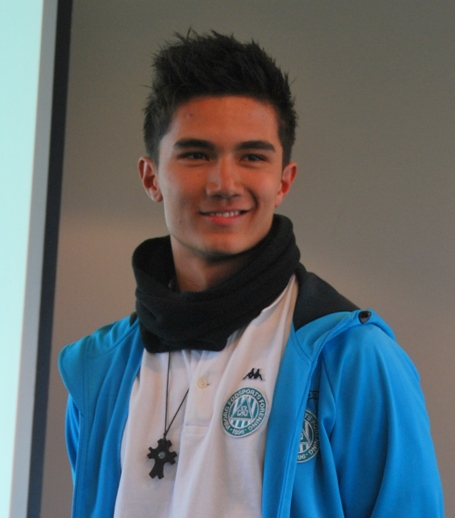
- Mendoza in 2012

Personal information
- Full name: Kevin Ray Mendoza Hansen
- Date of birth: 29 September 1994 (age 32)
- Place of birth: Herning, Denmark
- Height: 1.87 m (6 ft 2 in)
- Position: Goalkeeper

Team information
- Current team: Chonburi
- Number: 1

Youth career
- Midtjylland
- Viborg

Senior career*
| Years | Team | Apps | (Gls) |
| 2011–2014 | Viborg | 4 | (0) |
| 2014–2015 | Kjellerup | 0 | (0) |
| 2015 | Ringkøbing | 0 | (0) |
| 2015–2018 | Thisted | 62 | (0) |
| 2018–2019 | Horsens | 8 | (0) |
| 2019–2020 | HB Køge | 35 | (0) |
| 2020 | Vendsyssel FF | 16 | (0) |
| 2021–2023 | Kuala Lumpur City | 54 | (0) |
| 2023–2025 | Persib Bandung | 41 | (0) |
| 2025– | Chonburi | 3 | (0) |

International career^{‡}
| 2021– | Philippines | 19 | (0) |
- * Club domestic league appearances and goals as of 16 August 2025 ‡ National team caps and goals as of 15 October 2026

Kevin Ray Mendoza Hansen (born 29 September 1994) is a professional footballer who plays as a goalkeeper for Thai League 1 club Chonburi. Born in Denmark, he plays for the Philippines national team.

== Club career ==
=== Youth ===
Mendoza spent most of his youth with Danish club Midtjylland and Viborg as youth team player.

=== Viborg ===
In August 2011, Mendoza was promoted to Viborg's first team squad signing a 3-year contract with the club. Prior to that, he had repeatedly served as backup keeper for the club's first team after the departure of Kristian Kirk.

On 10 June 2012, Mendoza made his debut for Viborg on the final match of the season in a 2–1 defeat against West Zealand.

In February 2013, Mendoza was given a one-week trial and a chance to train with Liverpool's reserve team.

On 3 April 2014, Viborg announced that they had agreed to terminate the contract of Mendoza with immediate effect. Mendoza requested to leave after being demoted as third choice goalkeeper of the club.

=== Kjellerup ===
A few days after the termination of his contract at Viborg, Mendoza joined Kjellerup IF on 8 April 2014. On 12 April 2014, Mendoza made his debut for Kjellerup in a 3–0 home win against Aabyhøj.

=== Ringkøbing ===
After his stint in Kjellerup, Mendoza joined Ringkøbing, signing a six-month deal in January 2015.

=== Thisted ===
On 27 May 2015, Mendoza joined Thisted, a club that had been following him since the termination of his contract at Viborg. He went on the become the starting goalkeeper for the club.

=== Horsens ===
On 30 June 2018, it was announced that Mendoza have signed a two-year deal with Danish Superliga club Horsens. On 22 July, he made his debut for Horsens in a 1–1 home draw against Randers. The club announced on 19 June 2019 that they had terminated the contract with the player.

=== HB Køge ===
Mendoza joined HB Køge on 2 July 2019. He make his debut for the club on 28 July in a 3–1 lost to Nyköbing.

=== Vendsyssel ===
On 7 September 2020, he moved to Danish 1st Division club Vendsyssel. His contract was terminated on 11 February 2021.

=== Kuala Lumpur City ===
One day after leaving Vendsyssel, Mendoza joined Malaysia Super League club Kuala Lumpur City on 11 February 2021. He make his debut on 6 March in a 1–0 lost to Penang. Mendoza went on to help Kuala Lumpur City win the 2021 Malaysia Cup where was named man of the match in the final against Johor Darul Ta'zim. Mendoza also was instrumental on helping the club reach the 2022 AFC Cup final.

=== Persib Bandung ===
On 27 November 2023, Mendoza officially signed a contract with Persib Bandung which plays in Liga 1. He make his debut on 10 December in a 2–0 lost to Persik Kediri. In his time with the club, he was part of the club back-to-back league title champions helping them to win the 2023–24 and the 2024–25 edition.

=== Chonburi ===
On 3 July 2025, Mendoza signed recently promoted Thai League 1 club Chonburi.

== International career ==
Mendoza was born and raised in Denmark of mixed Danish and Filipino heritage, which made him eligible to play for Denmark or the Philippines at international level.

In December 2018, Mendoza applied for a Philippine passport to join the training camp of the Philippines national team in preparation for the 2019 AFC Asian Cup. He was named in the Asian Cup squad but did not feature in the tournament. His international debut was on 15 June 2021 as a half-time substitute for Bernd Schipmann in a 2022 FIFA World Cup qualifier against Maldives where he maintained the 1–1 draw in the first half.

== Career statistics ==
=== Club ===
As of match played 24 May 2025

Appearances and goals by club, season and competition
| Club | Season | League | | | National cup | | League cup | | Continental | | Total | |
| Club | Season | Division | Apps | Goals | Apps | Goals | Apps | Goals | Apps | Goals | Apps | Goals |
|---|---|---|---|---|---|---|---|---|---|---|---|---|
| Kuala Lumpur City | 2021 | Malaysia Super League | 22 | 0 | – | | 11 | 0 | – | | 33 | 0 |
| Kuala Lumpur City | 2022 | Malaysia Super League | 22 | 0 | 4 | 0 | 0 | 0 | 3 (Note: Appearances in AFC Cup) | 0 | 29 | 0 |
| Kuala Lumpur City | 2023 | Malaysia Super League | 10 | 0 | 2 | 0 | 0 | 0 | 0 | 0 | 12 | 0 |
| Kuala Lumpur City | Total | | 54 | 0 | 6 | 0 | 11 | 0 | 3 | 0 | 74 | 0 |
| Persib Bandung | 2023–24 | Liga 1 | 14 | 0 | 0 | 0 | — | | — | | 14 | 0 |
| Persib Bandung | 2024–25 | Liga 1 | 27 | 0 | 0 | 0 | 0 | 0 | 6 (Note: Appearances in AFC Champions League Two) | 0 | 33 | 0 |
| Persib Bandung | Total | | 41 | 0 | 0 | 0 | 0 | 0 | 6 | 0 | 47 | 0 |
| Career total | | | 94 | 0 | 6 | 0 | 11 | 0 | 9 | 0 | 120 | 0 |

=== International ===
As of match played 29 September 2026

Appearances and goals by national team and year
| National team | Year | Apps | Goals |
|---|---|---|---|
| Philippines | 2021 | 5 | 0 |
| Philippines | 2022 | 2 | 0 |
| Philippines | 2023 | 0 | 0 |
| Philippines | 2024 | 5 | 0 |
| Philippines | 2025 | 5 | 0 |
| Philippines | 2026 | 2 | 0 |
| Total | | 19 | 0 |

== Honours ==
Kuala Lumpur City

- Malaysia FA Cup runner-up: 2023
- Malaysia Cup: 2021
- AFC Cup runner-up: 2022

Persib Bandung

- Liga 1: 2023–24, 2024–25

Individual

- FAM Football Awards: Team of the Season 2021
