= Shukor Adan =

Malaysian footballer

Personal information
- Full name: Muhammad Shukor bin Adan
- Date of birth: 24 September 1979 (age 47)
- Place of birth: Malacca, Malaysia
- Height: 1.80 m (5 ft 11 in)
- Positions: Defensive midfielder; centre back

Team information
- Current team: Malaysia U17 (head coach) Malaysia U20 (head coach)

Youth career
- 1995–1997: Malacca
- 1998–1999: Negeri Sembilan

Senior career*
Years	Team	Apps	(Gls)
2000–2001	Negeri Sembilan	?	(2)
2002–2008	Selangor	?	(13)
2009–2012	Negeri Sembilan	?	(15)
2013	ATM	19	(4)
2014–2018	Felda United	98	(7)
2019	Melaka United	20	(2)
2020–2021	Kuala Lumpur City	15	(1)

International career^{‡}
2001–2014	Malaysia	56	(5)

Managerial career
- 2022–2023: Kuala Lumpur City (assistant)
- 2023–2026: Malaysia U23 (assistant)
- 2026–: Malaysia U17
- 2026–: Malaysia U20
Medal record
Malaysia U-23
Sea Games
Silver medal – second place	Sea Games 2001	Football
Malaysia
Asean Football Championship
Runner-up	AFF Suzuki Cup 2014	2014
- * Club domestic league appearances and goals as of 2 December 2021 ‡ National team caps and goals as of 2 December 2021

Muhammad Shukor bin Adan (born 24 September 1979), is a former Malaysian professional footballer. He played for many teams in Malaysia Football League such as Selangor and also Negeri Sembilan FA. He plays mainly as a defensive midfielder but can also play as a centre back. Shukor is the former captain of the Selangor team. He is a former member and former captain of the Malaysia national team of 2014 AFF Suzuki Cup campaign. He has been described as one of the top Malaysia midfielders in history. He is currently the head coach of Malaysia U17 and Malaysia U20.

== Club career ==
=== Malacca ===
Shukor started his football career with Malacca President Cup team in 1995.

=== Negeri Sembilan ===
Three years later, he joined Negeri Sembilan President Cup team. He got his big break when Negeri Sembilan called him up for the first team in 2000.

=== Selangor ===
Two years later, he signed a contract with Selangor and remained there until 2008. His contract was terminated by Selangor after spending six years with the team.After his contract with Selangor expired, he became a free agent for four months.

=== Return to Negeri Sembilan ===
In November 2008, he agreed to join a team based in Brunei DPMM for the 2009 Malaysia Super League season, after finishing his duty with the national team. However, he made a decision to return to his former team, Negeri Sembilan. Shukor helped them to win the 2009 Malaysia Cup and was named as the Man of the Match.

=== ATM ===
After his contract with Negeri Sembilan expired, he then joined the army team, ATM for the 2013 Malaysia Super League season.

=== Felda United ===
After spending a season with ATM, he signed a contract with Felda United and was appointed as the captain. He helped them secure promotion to the Malaysian Super League in 2015. At Felda, he was converted to a central defender from his usual position as central midfielder.

=== Melaka United ===
In the 2019 season, Shukor Adan transferred to Melaka United alongside many other ex-captains of other clubs like Razman Roslan from Selangor FA and Safiq Rahim from Johor Darul Ta'zim.

=== Kuala Lumpur City ===
In 2021, Shukor announced his retirement from football in 2021 Malaysia Cup Final. He hung up his boots happily after winning the 2021 Malaysia Cup against Johor Darul Ta'zim

== International career ==
Shukor made his international debut in the World Cup qualifier with the senior national team in 2001 under Allan Harris. In 2002, Shukor was call up for an international friendly match against five times World Cup winners Brazil. He came as substitute to replace Tengku Hazman against Brazilian stars such as Ronaldo and Barca's Ronaldinho. After that, he played for the national team in 2002 Tiger Cup, 2004 Tiger Cup, 2005 Islamic Solidarity Games, 2007 AFF Championship, 2007 AFC Asian Cup, 2008 AFF Suzuki Cup and 2014 AFF Suzuki Cup.

He played for the Malaysia Selection that lost 6–0 to Manchester United during the English champions tour of Asia. He also represented the Malaysia Selection as a captain against Chelsea at Shah Alam Stadium on 29 July 2008. The Malaysia Selection eventually lost 0–2. However, Chelsea's coach Luiz Felipe Scolari praised Malaysia XI for giving a good fight against his team.

He was unexpectedly recalled to Malaysia national team, after a long period of absence, for a match against Indonesia on 14 September 2014 by national coach Dollah Salleh. He started the match, which ends in a 2–0 loss to Malaysia.

Dollah Salleh called him up again for 2014 AFF Suzuki Cup tournament. He replaced Safiq Rahim as national team captain just before the tournament. He retired after the tournament.

== Career statistics ==
=== Club ===
As of match played 30 December 2021

Appearances and goals by club, season and competition
Club	Season	League			Cup		League Cup		Other		Total	
Club	Season	Division	Apps	Goals	Apps	Goals	Apps	Goals	Apps	Goals	Apps	Goals
Negeri Sembilan	2000	Liga Perdana 1		0		3		3	–			6
Negeri Sembilan	2001	Liga Perdana 1		2		1		3	–			6
Negeri Sembilan	Total			2		4		6	–			12
Selangor	2002	Liga Perdana 1		3		0		0	–			3
Selangor	2003	Liga Perdana 1		0		0		0	–			0
Selangor	2004	Malaysia Premier League		1		0		0	–			1
Selangor	2005	Malaysia Premier League		4		1		2	1 (Note: Appearances in 2005 Malaysia Premier League Final.)	0		7
Selangor	2006	Malaysia Super League		2		0		2	8 (Note: Appearances in 2006 AFC Cup.)	1		5
Selangor	2007	Malaysia Super League		1		0		3	–			4
Selangor	2008	Malaysia Super League		2		1		2	–			5
Selangor	Total			13		2		9	9	1		25
Negeri Sembilan	2009	Malaysia Super League		5		0		2	–			7
Negeri Sembilan	2010	Malaysia Super League		4		2		4	–			10
Negeri Sembilan	2011	Malaysia Super League	25	2	1	0	11	2	–		37	4
Negeri Sembilan	2012	Malaysia Super League	20	4	1	0	8	0	–		29	4
Negeri Sembilan	Total			15		2		8	–			25
ATM	2013	Malaysia Super League	19	4	1	0	10	1	1 (Note: Appearances in 2013 Piala Sumbangsih.)	0	31	5
ATM	Total		20	4	1	0	10	1	1	0	31	5
Felda United	2014	Malaysia Premier League	18	0	6	1	9	1	–		33	2
Felda United	2015	Malaysia Super League	20	2	1	0	10	0	–		31	2
Felda United	2016	Malaysia Super League	20	1	2	0	8	1	–		30	2
Felda United	2017	Malaysia Super League	20	1	1	0	9	1	4 (Note: Appearances in 2017 AFC Cup.)	0	34	2
Felda United	2018	Malaysia Premier League	20	3	4	1	7	1	–		31	5
Felda United	Total		98	7	14	2	43	4	4	0	159	13
Melaka United	2019	Malaysia Super League	20	2	1	1	6	0	–		27	3
Melaka United	Total		20	2	1	1	1	0	–		23	3
Kuala Lumpur City	2020	Malaysia Premier League	8	0	0	0	0	0	–		8	0
Kuala Lumpur City	2021	Malaysia Super League	7	1	0	0	1	0	–		8	1
Kuala Lumpur City	Total		15	1	0	0	1	0	–		16	1
Career total				44		11		28	14	1		84

=== International ===
As of 20 December 2014

Appearances and goals by national team and year
National team	Year	Apps	Goals
Malaysia	2001	3	0
Malaysia	2002	3	0
Malaysia	2003	6	1
Malaysia	2004	11	2
Malaysia	2005	3	0
Malaysia	2007	10	0
Malaysia	2008	10	1
Malaysia	2014	10	1
Total		56	5

=== International goals ===
Shukor Adan International Goals
#	Date	Venue	Opponent	Score	Result	Competition
1.	12 October 2003	Kuala Lumpur, Malaysia	Bahrain	1–2	2–2	2004 AFC Asian Cup qualification
2.	12 July 2004	Kuala Lumpur, Malaysia	Singapore	1–0	2−0	Friendly
3.	8 December 2004	Kuala Lumpur, Malaysia	Timor-Leste	5–0	5−0	2004 AFF Championship
4.	6 June 2008	Surabaya, Indonesia	Indonesia	1–1	1−1	Friendly
5.	11 December 2014	Hanoi, Vietnam	Vietnam	4–1	4–2	2014 AFF Championship

== Managerial statistics ==
As of match played 6 September 2026

Managerial record by team and tenure
Team	Nat.	From	To	Record								Ref.
Team	Nat.	From	To	G	W	D	L	GF	GA	GD	Win %	Ref.
Malaysia U17	(Malaysia)	12 March 2026	Present	7	3	1	3	7	11	−4	42.86	
Malaysia U20	(Malaysia)	12 August 2026	Present	3	1	2	0	4	3	+1	33.33	
Career Total				10	4	3	3	11	14	−3	40.00	

== Honours ==
=== Club ===
Selangor

- Malaysian Charity Shield: 2002
- Malaysian Premier League: 2005
- Malaysia Cup: 2002, 2005
- Malaysian FA Cup: 2005

Negeri Sembilan

- Malaysia Cup: 2009, 2011
- Malaysia FA Cup: 2010

ATM

- Malaysian Charity Shield: 2013

Felda United

- Malaysian Premier League: 2018, runner-up: 2014
- Malaysia FA Cup runner-up: 2014
- Malaysian Super League runner-up: 2016

Kuala Lumpur

- Malaysia Cup: 2021

=== International ===
Malaysia U-23

- Sea Games (silver) Silver: 2001

Malaysia

- Tiger Cup : 2000 third place
- Pestabola Merdeka: 2007
- AFF Championship runner-up: 2014

=== Individual ===
- FAM Football Awards – Most Valuable Players: 2007 – Selangor FA

=== Records ===
- The oldest goalscorer in Malaysia Super League (41 years old)
- The longest gap between first and last Malaysia Cup finals appearances: (2000–2021) 21 years

Sporting positions
Preceded by Khairul Fahmi Che Mat	Melaka United captain 2019 – present	Succeeded by Incumbent
Preceded by Safiq Rahim	Malaysia national football team captain 2014	Succeeded by Safiq Rahim
Preceded by unknown	Felda United captain 2014 – 2018	Succeeded by Hadin Azman
Preceded by unknown	Selangor captain 2007 – 2008	Succeeded by Mohd Amri Yahyah
