= Safiq Rahim =

Malaysian footballer

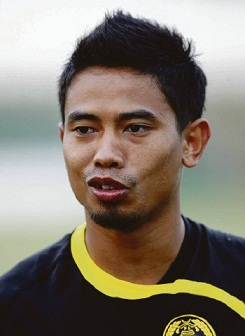
- Safiq in training with Malaysia in 2011

Personal information
- Full name: Safiq bin Rahim
- Date of birth: 5 July 1987 (age 39)
- Place of birth: Seremban, Negeri Sembilan, Malaysia
- Height: 1.70 m (5 ft 7 in)
- Position: Midfielder

Youth career
- 2003–2004: Bukit Jalil Sports School

Senior career*
Years	Team	Apps	(Gls)
2006–2008	Selangor	20	(0)
2009	KL PLUS	10	(2)
2010–2012	Selangor	76	(19)
2013–2018	Johor Darul Ta'zim	108	(24)
2019–2020	Melaka United	31	(4)
2021–2025	Johor Darul Ta'zim	41	(2)

International career^{‡}
2004–2006	Malaysia U20	5	(0)
2007–2010	Malaysia U23	26	(5)
2007–2022	Malaysia	81	(16)
Medal record
Malaysia under-23
Sea Games
Gold medal – first place	Sea Games 2009	Football
Malaysia
Asean Football Championship
Winner	AFF Suzuki Cup 2010	2010
Runner-up	AFF Suzuki Cup 2014	2014
- * Club domestic league appearances and goals as of 16 April 2025 ‡ National team caps and goals as of 8 June 2022

Safiq bin Rahim (Jawi: صفيق بن رحيم; born 5 July 1987) is a Malaysian former footballer who plays as a midfielder. He is also a former member of the Malaysia national team.

Safiq has played for Selangor, KL PLUS, Melaka United and Johor Darul Ta'zim. He was the part of Johor Darul Ta'zim squad which won the AFC Cup in 2015 and also the part of Selangor squad which won the 2010 Malaysia Super League.

Safiq has been named in the Malaysia national squad for three major tournaments: the 2007 AFF Championship, 2010 AFF Championship and 2014 AFF Championship. In the 2010 AFF Championship, he was a part of Malaysia's under-23 squad which won the AFF Championship title. He was also a part of Malaysia's senior squad which won the 2010 AFF Championship title.

Safiq has been honoured with the Football Association of Malaysia National Football Awards for the Best Midfielder Award for 2011 and 2012 as voted by the public. He also was voted as the best Malaysian footballer in 2015 by Goal.com. He was voted as the best Malaysian footballer in 2016 and 2017 by FOX Sports Asia. He also was awarded as 2015 AFC Cup Most Valuable Player.

Safiq was named in the Malaysian Squad of the Year 10 times from 2006 to 2016. He was named in the AFF Squad of the Year 3 times from 2012 to 2014.

== Early life ==
Safiq bin Rahim was born in Seremban, Negeri Sembilan and grew up in Selangor. His passion towards football began when he was a kid. At first, his parents did not approve of him being a professional footballer as they wanted him to focus on academics. As a result, he entered SMK Seksyen 11 (Sekolah Sukan Selangor) and Bukit Jalil Sports School from 2003 to 2004 to further his studies.

== Club career ==
=== Selangor ===
Safiq was promoted to the Selangor first team in the 2006/2007 season. Under Dollah Salleh, he made his debut on 27 December 2006 in a 3–1 defeat against Negeri Sembilan which he came in as a substitute. In his first season with Selangor, he was nominated as the Most Promising Player for the 2007 FAM National Football Award. In the 2007/2008 season, Safiq secured his place in the starting eleven of Selangor's first team, helping Selangor finished 4th in the Malaysia Super League and runners-up in both Malaysia FA Cup and Malaysia Cup. In the 2008 Malaysia President Cup final, Safiq's only goal gave Selangor U-21 a 1–0 win over Perak U-21.

=== KL PLUS ===
On 19 September 2008, Safiq signed a contract with newly promoted club KL PLUS after he turned down the Football Association of Selangor's offer to extend his contract. Safiq contribute 2 league goals against Pahang and Kuala Muda Naza. At the end of 2009 season, Safiq left KL PLUS and returned to Selangor.

=== Return to Selangor ===
On 1 December 2009, it was announced that Safiq signed with Selangor for a second stint from KL PLUS. He was handed the number 8 jersey ahead of the 2010 season. Safiq made his season debut for Selangor in a 1–2 win over Negeri Sembilan in the Sultan Haji Ahmad Shah Cup at Tuanku Abdul Rahman Stadium. On 19 January 2010, he scored his first goal for Selangor in a 4–0 win over Pahang. On 23 February 2010, Safiq made his AFC Cup debut in a 0–0 draw against Vietnamese Becamex Bình Dương at Shah Alam Stadium. He scored his first AFC Cup goal in a 5–0 win over Maldivian Victory SC on 6 April 2010. Safiq has scored 9 goals in all competitions during his season debut. He was part of the Selangor team that won the 2010 Super League Malaysia and the 2010 Malaysia Charity Shield.

In the 2011 season, Safiq his season first appearance in a 0–2 defeat to Kelantan in a Malaysia Charity Shield match on 29 January 2011. Safiq played as a starter before being substituted with Fitri Shazwan in the 46th minute of the match. Safiq scored his first goal of the season on 12 March 2011, in an away match against Negeri Sembilan. The match ended in a 2–1 victory for Selangor. He added his second goal of the season on 16 April 2011 against Perak in a 1–0 home win. Overall Safiq has scored 11 goals in all 2011 season competitions and made 26 league appearances with 23 times as a starter.

On 30 June 2011, Indonesian club, Persib Bandung announced that they would give him a contract for the 2011–12 Indonesia Super League season, which he later chose to reject.

In August 2011 after the 2011 Malaysia Cup campaign ended, Safiq was given a three-week trial from the Welsh club, Cardiff City with the help of the Cardiff owner, Chan Tien Ghee who is also a Malaysian, along with fellow Malaysian Safee Sali. Safiq officially underwent his three-week trial began on 24 November 2011 and ended on 11 December 2011.

On 24 October 2011, Safiq refused to undergo a trial with the Indonesian, Arema-Pelita club.

On 30 November 2011, Safiq was honoured with the FAM National Football Awards for the Best Midfielder Award, as voted by the public.

For the 2012 season, Safiq scored his first goal of the season in his season debut match in a 2–2 draw against Negeri Sembilan on 10 January 2012 at Tuanku Abdul Rahman Stadium in Paroi. He continued his good form with the winning goal in a 1–0 win over Perak the following week. On 18 February 2012, Safiq scored twice in a 0–4 win over Shahzan Muda for the FA Cup match in Temerloh Mini Stadium. On 25 August 2012, Safiq scored the first goal in a 2–2 draw against Pahang for the Malaysia Cup group stage match. Three days later, in the Malaysia Cup campaign, Safiq scored a winning goal through a penalty kick in the 80th minute of the match. As Selangor advanced to the quarter-finals of the Malaysia Cup, Safiq's other goal came in a 1–3 win over Johor FC on 25 September 2012 in the first leg. Safiq concluded his 2012 season with 10 goals in all competitions.

=== Johor Darul Ta'zim ===
After his contract with Selangor expired on 30 November 2012, Safiq was set to join Johor Darul Ta'zim for the 2013 season. On 1 December 2013, he signed a one-year contract with an option for another year with the club. It was reported that Safiq was among the highest-paid local players with a monthly salary of RM 70,000 (around US$17,000). Safiq made his debut and scored in the opening match of the 2013 Malaysia Super League against Pahang. In 2015, he was named club captain and was part of the squad that won the 2015 AFC Cup. On 31 November 2015, he captained the side for the final, playing the full 90 minutes and being voted man of the match in a 1–0 victory against FC Istiklol at Pamir Stadium. Safiq was named as the 2015 AFC Cup's Most Valuable Player and lauded his Johor Darul Ta’zim teammates after the club became the first from Malaysia to claim a continental title.

On 14 December 2015, Safiq signed a new four-year contract with Johor Darul Ta'zim until 2019.

On 2 November 2018, Safiq leaves Johor Darul Ta'zim after six seasons. According to club owner, Tunku Ismail Sultan Ibrahim described Safiq, who signed from Selangor back in 2013, as one of his best players as he helped the Southern Tigers achieve success in both domestic and international competitions. He added in his latest Facebook post, “In my sincere opinion, he (Safiq) has been the most successful player at Johor Darul Ta’zim and has helped the Southern Tigers achieve our goals. The most successful player, the best captain in the history of JDT and a great player who has not only contributed to JDT, but also to Selangor and the national team”. Then, Tunku Ismail said the door would always be open for Safiq to return in the future. Safiq won multiple trophies with JDT, including five straight Super League titles since 2014, the 2015 Asian Football Confederation (AFC) Cup, the 2016 FA Cup and the 2017 Malaysia Cup. He also won the 2010 ASEAN Football Federation title with the national senior squad as well as the gold medal with the under-23 squad in the 2009 Laos SEA Games.

=== Melaka United ===
On 10 December 2018, Safiq joined Melaka United for the 2019 Malaysian league season. He signed a one-year contract for a Malacca-city-based club, alongside his national teammate, Razman Roslan and also Felda United's former captain Shukor Adan.

=== Return to Johor Darul Ta'zim ===
Safiq returned to Johor Darul Ta'zim in February 2021 after playing for two seasons with Melaka United.[3] On 3 July 2023, Safiq came off the bench and scored his 50th Malaysia Super League goal in a 6–1 win over Kuala Lumpur City.

== International career ==
=== Youth ===
Safiq started his international career with Malaysia U-20 team at aged 17 under K. Rajagobal. He has participated in 2004 AFC Youth Championship which Malaysia has lost 0–3 to China PR in the quarterfinal. Safiq also was part of the team which qualified for the 2006 AFC Youth Championship in India which they were finished at the bottom place of the group stage.

=== Malaysia U-23 ===
Safiq was called up by Malaysia U-23 national coach K.Rajagobal for 2009 Southeast Asian Games in Vientiane, Laos. He scored 3 goals to assist the national U-23 sides to win the gold medal for the first time after 20 years since the team won it in 1989.

=== Senior ===
Safiq has represented Malaysia since 2005. He earned his first full international cap against Myanmar in the 2007 ASEAN Football Championship in January 2007 at age 20. Since then, he only made appearances with the under-23 national team. He scored his first international senior goal in an unofficial friendly match against Zimbabwe on 12 July 2009.

Safiq scored twice from a free kick in a friendly against Singapore on 8 and 12 June 2012 consecutively. On 16 October 2012, he scored another goal, again from a free kick in a 3–0 win over Hong Kong.

On 27 January 2015, FIFA.com has published an article about his expertise in taking a free kick after skippering his side to a runners-up finish in 2014 AFF Suzuki Cup. Safiq who also the top-scorer during the tournament has scored 5 goals from set pieces.

On 12 July 2016, Safiq announced his retirement from international football via his football club's website and Facebook page. He retired from national team alongside fellow club teammate, Aidil Zafuan.

On 29 March 2017, Safiq announced to come back from retirement after club owner Johor Darul Ta'zim FC became the new president of FAM and also to contribute his experience and skill he gathered from his club for his national team. Once he made a comeback, the national team became more spirit with a short pass, (tiki-taka) playing style.

On 10 October 2017, Safiq was shown a straight red card 2019 AFC Asian Cup qualifying match away to Hong Kong for stamping on Daniel Cancela. Malaysia lost the match 0–2.

Safiq is also part of the Malaysian team that qualified for the 2023 AFC Asian Cup. He played 2 matches against Turkmenistan and Bahrain in Third Round Group E Qualification.

==== 2010 AFF Championship ====
Safiq was selected by Malaysia to captain the Malaysian team in the 2010 AFF Championship co-hosted by Indonesia and Vietnam. Safiq made all 7 appearances throughout the tournament. It was the first time in history that Malaysia won the AFF Championship title.

==== 2012 AFF Championship ====
Safiq made his first 2012 AFF Championship in a 0–3 defeat to Singapore in their group stage first match on 25 November 2012. On 28 November 2012, Safiq scored the opening goal with a free kick in 1–4 win over Laos.

==== 2014 AFF Championship ====
On 19 November 2014, Safiq was named in the Malaysia squad for the 2014 AFF Championship. On 26 November 2014, Safiq scored one goal in a 2–3 defeat to Thailand. He scored the match first goal in the 28th minute before Adisak Kraisorn made an equaliser 2 minutes before the half time.

In the final group stage match against Singapore, Safiq's performance was noted as he statistically recorded the most passes and touches on the ball. He converted a penalty during the match despite a jeering crowd's reaction, helping Malaysia progress to the knockout stage.

In the first leg semi final match against Vietnam, Safiq converted another penalty but Malaysia lost 1–2. In the second leg, Safiq scored the opening goal after Malaysia received a penalty kick in the 4th minutes. In the second leg of the 2014 AFF Championship final, Safiq scored another penalty in the 7th minutes. He then scored his sixth goal of the tournament, a free kick but two late goals from Thailand resulted in Malaysia losing 3–4 on aggregate. With his 6-goal haul, Safiq became the first midfielder in the tournament's 18-year history to have picked up the Golden Boot award.

=== Malaysia XI ===
On 13 and 16 July 2011, Safiq captained the Malaysia XI in their matches against Arsenal and Liverpool. Malaysia XI lost 0–4 against Arsenal. Just before the stroke of half time against Liverpool, with Malaysia trailing 0–1, Safiq scored from a free-kick to equalise for Malaysia. Despite a spirited comeback, Malaysia XI went on to lose 3–6 to Liverpool.

== Personal life ==
Safiq is the eldest child of Rahim bin Muhd. Yatim and Aidah binti Majid. He has a sister, Safiqa.

Safiq is married to Malaysian professional ten-pin bowler, Zandra Aziela.

On 7 May 2024, Safiq was accosted by two individuals on a motorcycle who threatened him with a hammer and smashed his car's window. Two people were arrested, one of whom was later released.

== Career statistics ==
=== Club ===
As of 16 December 2023

Appearances and goals by club, season and competition
Club	Season	League (Note: Including Malaysia Charity Shield)			Cup		League Cup		Continental (Note: Including AFC Cup and AFC Champions League)		Total	
Club	Season	Division	Apps	Goals	Apps	Goals	Apps	Goals	Apps	Goals	Apps	Goals
Selangor	2006–07	Malaysia Super League	3	0	2	0	2	0	—		7	0
Selangor	2007–08	Malaysia Super League	17	0	5	0	4	0	—		26	0
Selangor	Total		20	0	7	0	6	0	—		33	0
PLUS	2009	Malaysia Super League	10	2	1	0	4	0	—		15	2
PLUS	Total		10	2	1	0	4	0	—		15	2
Selangor	2010	Malaysia Super League	26	7	6	0	7	1	6	1	45	9
Selangor	2011	Malaysia Super League	26	7	4	0	10	4	—		40	11
Selangor	2012	Malaysia Super League	24	5	1	2	9	3	—		34	10
Selangor	Total		76	19	11	2	26	8	6	1	119	30
Johor Darul Ta'zim	2013	Malaysia Super League	18	1	4	0	7	2	—		29	3
Johor Darul Ta'zim	2014	Malaysia Super League	20	1	3	0	9	4	—		32	5
Johor Darul Ta'zim	2015	Malaysia Super League	19	7	1	0	7	4	13	4	40	15
Johor Darul Ta'zim	2016	Malaysia Super League	17	4	7	2	5	1	9	8	38	15
Johor Darul Ta'zim	2017	Malaysia Super League	21	9	4	0	7	2	9	4	41	15
Johor Darul Ta'zim	2018	Malaysia Super League	13	2	4	0	1	0	7	1	25	3
Johor Darul Ta'zim	Total		108	24	23	2	36	13	38	17	205	56
Melaka United	2019	Malaysia Super League	21	3	1	0	8	1	—		30	4
Melaka United	2020	Malaysia Super League	10	1	0	0	1	0	—		11	1
Melaka United	Total		31	4	1	0	9	1	–		41	5
Johor Darul Ta'zim	2021	Malaysia Super League	13	0	–		9	0	6	0	28	0
Johor Darul Ta'zim	2022	Malaysia Super League	14	0	4	1	4	0	3	0	25	1
Johor Darul Ta'zim	2023	Malaysia Super League	9	1	0	0	4	0	2	0	15	1
Johor Darul Ta'zim	Total		36	1	4	1	17	0	11	0	68	2
Career Total			281	50	47	5	98	22	55	18	481	95

=== International ===
As of 11 June 2022

Appearances and goals by national team and year
National team	Year	Apps	Goals	Ratio
Malaysia	2007	1	0	0.00
Malaysia	2009	7	0	0.00
Malaysia	2010	9	0	0.00
Malaysia	2011	8	4	0.50
Malaysia	2012	15	4	0.27
Malaysia	2013	5	0	0.00
Malaysia	2014	13	6	0.46
Malaysia	2015	9	1	0.11
Malaysia	2016	1	0	0.00
Malaysia	2017	6	0	0.00
Malaysia	2018	1	0	0.00
Malaysia	2022	6	1	0.16
Total		81	16	0.20

==== International goals ====
As of match played 8 June 2022. Malaysia score listed first, score column indicates score after each Safiq goal.

International goals by date, venue, cap, opponent, score, result and competition
No.	Date	Venue	Opponent	Score	Result	Competition
	12 July 2009	KLFA Stadium, Cheras, Malaysia	Zimbabwe	1–0	4–0	Friendly
	30 December 2009	KLFA Stadium, Cheras, Malaysia	Syria	1–0	4–1	Friendly
	30 December 2009	KLFA Stadium, Cheras, Malaysia	Syria	2–1	4–1	Friendly
1.	9 February 2011	Shah Alam Stadium, Shah Alam, Malaysia	Hong Kong	1–0	2–0	Friendly
2.	29 June 2011	Bukit Jalil National Stadium, Malaysia	Chinese Taipei	1–0	2–1	2014 FIFA World Cup qualification
3.	3 July 2011	Taipei Municipal Stadium, Taipei, Taiwan	Chinese Taipei	2–1	2–3	2014 FIFA World Cup qualification
4.	13 November 2011	Indira Gandhi Athletic Stadium, Guwahati, India	India	1–0	1–1	Friendly
5.	8 June 2012	Jalan Besar Stadium, Kallang, Singapore	Singapore	2–0	2–2	Friendly
6.	12 June 2012	Shah Alam Stadium, Shah Alam, Malaysia	Singapore	2–0	2–0	Friendly
7.	16 October 2012	Mong Kok Stadium, Mong Kok, Hong Kong	Hong Kong	2–0	3–0	Friendly
8.	28 November 2012	Bukit Jalil National Stadium, Malaysia	Laos	1–0	4–1	2012 AFF Suzuki Cup
	17 March 2013	Shah Alam Stadium, Shah Alam, Malaysia	Saudi Arabia	1–2	1–4	Friendly
	9 October 2013	Shenzhen Universiade Sports Centre, China	United Arab Emirates	1–3	1–3	Friendly
9.	26 November 2014	Jalan Besar Stadium, Kallang, Singapore	Thailand	2–1	2–3	2014 AFF Suzuki Cup
10.	29 November 2014	National Stadium, Kallang, Singapore	Singapore	2–1	3–1	2014 AFF Suzuki Cup
11.	7 December 2014	Shah Alam Stadium, Shah Alam, Malaysia	Vietnam	1–0	1–2	2014 AFF Suzuki Cup
12.	11 December 2014	Mỹ Đình National Stadium, Hanoi, Vietnam	Vietnam	2–1	4–2	2014 AFF Suzuki Cup
13.	20 December 2014	Bukit Jalil National Stadium, Malaysia	Thailand	1–0	3–2	2014 AFF Suzuki Cup
14.	20 December 2014	Bukit Jalil National Stadium, Malaysia	Thailand	3–0	3–2	2014 AFF Suzuki Cup
15.	3 September 2015	Shah Alam Stadium, Shah Alam, Malaysia	Saudi Arabia	1–0	1–2	2018 FIFA World Cup qualification
16.	1 June 2022	National Stadium, Bukit Jalil, Malaysia	Hong Kong	2–0	2–0	Friendly

Note:
Non-FIFA matches

== Honours ==
=== Club ===
Selangor

- President Cup: 2008
- Malaysia Charity Shield: 2010
- Malaysia Super League: 2010

Johor Darul Ta'zim

- AFC Cup: 2015
- Malaysia Super League: 2014, 2015, 2016, 2017, 2018, 2021, 2022, 2023, 2024–25
- Malaysia FA Cup: 2016, 2022, 2023, 2024
- Piala Sumbangsih: 2015, 2016, 2018, 2021, 2022, 2023, 2024
- Malaysia Cup: 2017, 2022, 2024–25

=== International ===
Malaysia U-18

- 2005 : Lion City Cup

Malaysia U-23

- 2009 : SEA Games Gold

Malaysia

- 2010 : AFF Championship champion;
- 2014 : AFF Championship runner-up

=== Individual ===
==== Awards ====
- AFF Championship Top Scorer: 2014
- FAM Football Awards – Best Midfielder: 2011, 2012, 2015, 2016
- FAM Football Awards – Most Valuable Player: 2015
- AFF Best XI (2012 AFF Championship): 2012
- AFF Championship All-time XI: 2021
- ASEAN Football Federation Best XI: 2013
- Malaysia Cup Final Best Player: 2014
- ASEAN All-Stars: 2014
- AFC Cup Most Valuable Player: 2015
- Goal.com The Best Malaysia XI of all time: 2020
