= Jang Suk-won =

South Korean football player

Personal information
- Full name: Jang Suk-won
- Date of birth: 11 August 1989 (age 37)
- Place of birth: South Korea
- Height: 1.86 m (6 ft 1 in)
- Position: Centre back

Youth career
- 2008–2009: Dankook University

Senior career*
Years	Team	Apps	(Gls)
2010–2016	Seongnam FC	55	(0)
2012–2013	→ Sangju Sangmu (army)	2	(0)
2017	Ulsan Hyundai	2	(0)
2019–2021	Melaka United	48	(2)
2022–2023	Kedah Darul Aman	9	(1)
2024–	Seoboo	0	(0)

International career^{‡}
2009	South Korea U-20	1	(0)
2009–	South Korea U-23	3	(0)
Medal record
Representing South Korea
Men's football
Asian Games
Bronze medal – third place	2010 Guangzhou	Team
- * Club domestic league appearances and goals as of 28 May 2022 ‡ National team caps and goals as of 14 January 2011

Jang Suk-won (born August 11, 1989) is a South Korean football who plays as defender.

== Club career ==
=== Kedah ===
On 16 December 2021, Jang Suk-Won agreed to join Malaysia Super League side Kedah Darul Aman.

He subsequently got injured and decided to retire.

== Career statistics ==
As of 17 May 2022

Club	Season	National League			Cup		League Cup		Continental		Total	
Club	Season	Division	Apps	Goals	Apps	Goals	Apps	Goals	Apps	Goals	Apps	Goals
Seongnam FC	2010	K League	3	0	0	0	0	0	1	0	4	0
Seongnam FC	2011	K League	0	0	0	0	0	0	0	0	0	0
Seongnam FC	Total		3	0	0	0	0	0	0	0	4	0
Sangju Sangmu FC	2012	K League Classic	2	0	0	0	0	0	0	0	2	0
Seongnam FC	2014	K League Classic	20	0	0	0	2	0	0	0	22	0
Seongnam FC	2015	K League Classic	18	0	0	0	2	0	2	0	22	0
Seongnam FC	2016	K League Classic	14	0	0	0	2	0	0	0	16	0
Seongnam FC	Total		52	0	0	0	6	0	0	0	60	0
Fagiano Okayama	2017	J2 League	2	0	0	0	0	0	0	0	2	0
Melaka United	2019	Malaysia Super League	19	1	1	0	0	0	–		20	1
Melaka United	2020	Malaysia Super League	9	0	0	0	1	0	–		10	0
Melaka United	2021	Malaysia Super League	19	1	0	0	9	0	–		28	1
Melaka United	Total		47	2	1	0	10	0	0	0	58	2
Kedah Darul Aman	2022	Malaysia Super League	9	0	0	0	0	0	0	0	9	0
Career Total			115	2	1	0	16	0	3	0	135	2
