= Faris Shah Rosli =

Malaysian footballer

Faris Shah
Personal information
- Full name: Mohamad Faris Shah bin Mohd Rosli
- Date of birth: 17 April 1995 (age 31)
- Place of birth: Kelantan, Malaysia
- Height: 1.75 m (5 ft 9 in)
- Position: Centre-back

Team information
- Current team: Kelantan TRW
- Number: 45

Youth career
- 2013: Harimau Muda C
- 2014–2015: Harimau Muda B
- 2015: Harimau Muda
- 2016: Kelantan U21

Senior career*
Years	Team	Apps	(Gls)
2014	Harimau Muda B	15	(1)
2015	Harimau Muda	6	(1)
2016–2018	Kelantan	12	(0)
2018–2022	Melaka United	74	(2)
2023–2024	Penang	20	(0)
2024–2025	PT Athletic	26	(2)
2025–	Kelantan TRW	1	(0)

International career^{‡}
2013	Malaysia U19	10	(4)
2014–2018	Malaysia U23	6	(0)
Medal record
Malaysia U21
Nations Cup
Runner-up	Nations Cup 2016	Football
- * Club domestic league appearances and goals as of August 9, 2025 ‡ National team caps and goals as of August 1, 2016

Mohamad Faris Shah bin Mohd Rosli (born 17 April 1995) is a Malaysian professional footballer who plays as a centre-back for Malaysia Super League club Kelantan TRW.

== Club career ==
=== Early career ===
Faris started his career with Harimau Muda C in 2013. He was also part of the squad for Malaysia U19 that competed in 2013 AFF U-19 Youth Championship.

=== Harimau Muda ===
In 2014, he joined Harimau Muda, which competed in the S.League and made 15 appearances and scored one goal in the league. He also made an appearance in the 2014 Singapore Cup before they were knocked out by Tampines Rovers in penalty shoot-out. For the 2015 season he made six appearances and scored one goal before returning to his home ground team Kelantan after the Harimau Muda program was disbanded.

=== Kelantan ===
Faris first played and the captained of Kelantan U21 team before being promoted to the senior squad during second transfer window in 2016. He made his debut for Kelantan in Malaysia Cup match against Selangor as substitute for Norhafiz Zamani in the 65th minute. His league debut for the team came on 23 July 2016 in a 0–0 draw against Pahang in Sultan Muhammad IV Stadium.

Faris was sidelined throughout 2017 season due to injury.

=== Melaka United ===
In May 2018, Faris were transferred to Melaka United.

== International career ==
Faris is also a member and captain of the Malaysia U23 team, who were competing in the 2016 Nations Cup and the runners-up for the competition after defeated by Thailand U23 1–2 in the final.

== Career statistics ==
=== Club ===
As of match played 15 September 2022

Appearances and goals by club, season and competition
Club	Season	League			Cup		League Cup		Continental / Other		Total	
Club	Season	Division	Apps	Goals	Apps	Goals	Apps	Goals	Apps	Goals	Apps	Goals
Harimau Muda B	2014	S.League	15	1	1	0	—		—		16	1
Harimau Muda B	Total		15	1	1	0	—		—		16	1
Harimau Muda	2015	S.League	6	1	0	0	—		—		6	1
Harimau Muda	Total		6	1	0	0	—		—		6	1
Kelantan	2016	Malaysia Super League	9	0	0	0	6	0	—		15	0
Kelantan	2017	Malaysia Super League	0	0	0	0	0	0	—		0	0
Kelantan	2018	Malaysia Super League	3	0	0	0	0	0	—		3	0
Kelantan	Total		12	0	0	0	6	0	–	–	18	0
Melaka United	2018	Malaysia Super League	9	0	0	0	6	0	—		15	0
Melaka United	2019	Malaysia Super League	18	0	0	0	1	0	—		19	0
Melaka United	2020	Malaysia Super League	8	0	0	0	0	0	—		8	0
Melaka United	2021	Malaysia Super League	19	1	0	0	7	0	—		26	1
Melaka United	2022	Malaysia Super League	20	1	2	0	0	0	—		22	1
Melaka United	Total		74	2	2	0	14	0	–	–	90	2
Penang	2023	Malaysia Super League	20	0	3	0	1	0	4 (Note: Appearances in MFL Challenge Cup)	0	28	0
Penang	Total		20	0	3	0	1	0	4	0	28	0
Career Total			107	4	3	0	20	0	–	–	130	4
