= Darko Marković =

Montenegrin footballer

Personal information
- Date of birth: 15 May 1987 (age 39)
- Place of birth: Titograd, SFR Yugoslavia
- Height: 1.83 m (6 ft 0 in)
- Position: Midfielder

Team information
- Current team: OFK Titograd
- Number: 7

Senior career*
Years	Team	Apps	(Gls)
2002–2003	Budućnost Podgorica		
2003–2007	Zeta	95	(6)
2008–2011	Pakhtakor	96	(17)
2011	Dečić	11	(1)
2011–2012	Újpest	24	(1)
2013	Lovćen	14	(2)
2013–2015	Mogren	43	(7)
2015	Mladost Velika Obarska	12	(4)
2015–2016	Zeta	31	(0)
2016–2017	Željezničar Sarajevo	24	(3)
2018	Dečić	11	(1)
2019	Melaka United	10	(2)
2019–2020	→ Kuala Lumpur (loan)	8	(1)
2020	Erbil	5	(1)
2020−2021	Mornar	10	(0)
2021−2022	Arsenal Tivat	14	(2)
2022−	OFK Titograd	15	(2)
- * Club domestic league appearances and goals as of 3 February 2022

Darko Marković (Serbian Cyrillic: Дарко Марковић, born 15 May 1987) is a Montenegrin footballer who plays as a midfielder for OFK Titograd. His transfer in 2008 from Fk Zeta to Fc Pakhtakor worth 1 million $. He played Asian Champions League in three editions and helped the team to reach the quarter-final in 2009. The same year (2009) he was elected in the 'best eleven' in Asia Champions League by reputable world soccer website 'Goal.com'.

== Club career ==
Marković has played for Pakhtakor in the three editions of the AFC Champions League, and helped the club reach the quarter-finals of the 2009 edition.

2009 website "Goal.com" marked him as one of the eleven best players in Asia champions league.

Also, the same year Russian website "Sports.ru" marked him as one of five best players in the former SSSR without Russian and Ukrainian players.

2010 website "The-Afc.com" marked him as a Key player of FC Pakhtakor.

2016 website "sports.uz" marked him in top 10 transfers in Uzbekistan Football history in third place, just after Luisao and Rivaldo.
