= Syamim Yahya =

Malaysian footballer

Personal information
- Full name: Ahmad Syamim bin Yahya
- Date of birth: 17 May 1990 (age 36)
- Place of birth: Raub, Pahang, Malaysia
- Height: 1.80 m (5 ft 11 in)
- Positions: Left winger; left midfielder

Team information
- Current team: Immigration F.C.
- Number: 11

Senior career*
Years	Team	Apps	(Gls)
2012–2013	Johor	5	(1)
2013–2014	T-Team	12	(1)
2014–2016	Felda United	26	(8)
2016–2017	Pahang	19	(1)
2017–2018	Felda United	3	(1)
2019	Terengganu	20	(3)
2020–2021	Melaka United	22	(1)
2022	Perak	5	(0)
2023-	Immigration F.C.	3	(0)

International career^{‡}
2015–	Malaysia	4	(0)
- * Club domestic league appearances and goals as of 22 November 2018 ‡ National team caps and goals as of 24 January 2015

Ahmad Syamim Bin Yahya (born 17 May 1990) is a Malaysian professional footballer who plays as a winger for Malaysia M3 League club Immigration F.C.

== Early life ==
Syamim was born in district of Raub, Pahang, on 17 May 1990. He studied at Sekolah Teknik Bentong and has represented the school, district and state in football competitions. After finishing high school, he attended a course at Institut Kemahiran Mara in Kampung Pandan. At the same time, he also played in Raub district league.

== Club career ==
=== Johor ===
In 2012, at the age of 22, Syamim participated in the selection of the Johor and successfully made it through the selection and be part of Johor team. That was how his career as a professional footballer began. He played a year for Johor FA before the team merged with Johor FC to reform as JDT. He was released, and Peter Butler signed him up for T team before the 2013 campaign began. A year later he joined Felda where Irfan Bakti managed to dig the best out of him.

=== Felda United ===
In January 2014, Syamim signed with Jengka based club, Felda United playing in Malaysian second-tier league, Malaysia Premier League. He spent 3 seasons with Felda United before leaving to Pahang in January 2017. While playing for the team, he was injured and spent a lot of time off the field.

=== Pahang ===
On 21 January 2017, during league campaign, Syamim scored one goal during his debut with Pahang playing against Perak in Ipoh. Syamim who joined Pahang FA this season, was a winger for Felda United in the last two seasons. He scored six goals in 2015 but only managed two in an injury-plagued season last year.

=== Returned to Felda ===
After a season with Pahang blighted by injury. Syamim re-signed with Felda for 2018 and the team became champions of the 2018 Malaysia Premier League

=== Terengganu F.C. ===
After one amazing season winning the second-tier league with Felda United, Syamim decided to join Terengganu for the 2019 season.

== Bad Boy attitude ==
Syamim was known for his style of play with tough tackler and dirty challenged. On 25 February 2017, he was fined RM 500 by the FAM after showing middle finger to somebody during match against Melaka United. Shamim later apologize over his action, he said that he just joking with his old-friend whom now play for Malacca and stated it's not about raged or anger.

== Career statistics ==
=== Club ===
As of match played 3 September 2021

Appearances and goals by club, season and competition
Club	Season	League			Cup		League Cup		Continental		Total	
Club	Season	Division	Apps	Goals	Apps	Goals	Apps	Goals	Apps	Goals	Apps	Goals
Johor	2012	Malaysia Premier League	0	0	0	0	0	0	–		0	0
Johor	Total		0	0	0	0	0	0	–		0	0
T-Team	2013	Malaysia Super League	0	0	0	0	0	0	–		0	0
T-Team	Total		0	0	0	0	0	0	–		0	0
Felda United	2014	Malaysia Premier League	0	0	0	0	0	0	–		0	0
Felda United	2015	Malaysia Super League	?	4	1	0	?	1	–		30	5
Felda United	2016	Malaysia Super League	14	2	2	0	?	?	–		0	0
Felda United	Total		0	0	0	0	0	0	–		0	0
Pahang	2017	Malaysia Super League	19	1	7	1	5	0	–		31	2
Pahang	Total		19	1	7	1	5	0	–		31	2
Felda United	2018	Malaysia Premier League	7	1	0	0	5	0	–		12	1
Felda United	Total		7	1	0	0	5	0	–		12	1
Terengganu	2019	Malaysia Super League	20	3	4	0	1	0	–		25	3
Terengganu	Total		20	3	4	0	1	0	–		25	3
Melaka United	2020	Malaysia Super League	10	0	0	0	0	0	–		10	0
Melaka United	2021	Malaysia Malaysia League	12	1	0	0	0	0	–		12	1
Melaka United	Total		22	1	0	0	0	0	–		22	1
Career total			0	0	0	0	0	0	–		0	0

=== International ===
As of 28 August 2017

Appearances and goals by national team and year
National team	Year	Apps	Goals
Malaysia	2015	3	0
Malaysia	2017	1	0
Total		4	0

== International career ==
In May 2015, Syamim has been selected to represent Malaysia XI in 2015 AIA Cup competition against English Premier League club, Tottenham Hotspur. The match took place on 27 May at the Shah Alam Stadium. Malaysia XI lost the match by a score of 2–1.

== Honours ==
=== Clubs ===
==== Felda United ====
- Malaysia Premier League: Runner-up; 2014
- Malaysia Super League: Runner-up; 2016
