= Davy Claude Angan =

Ivorian footballer

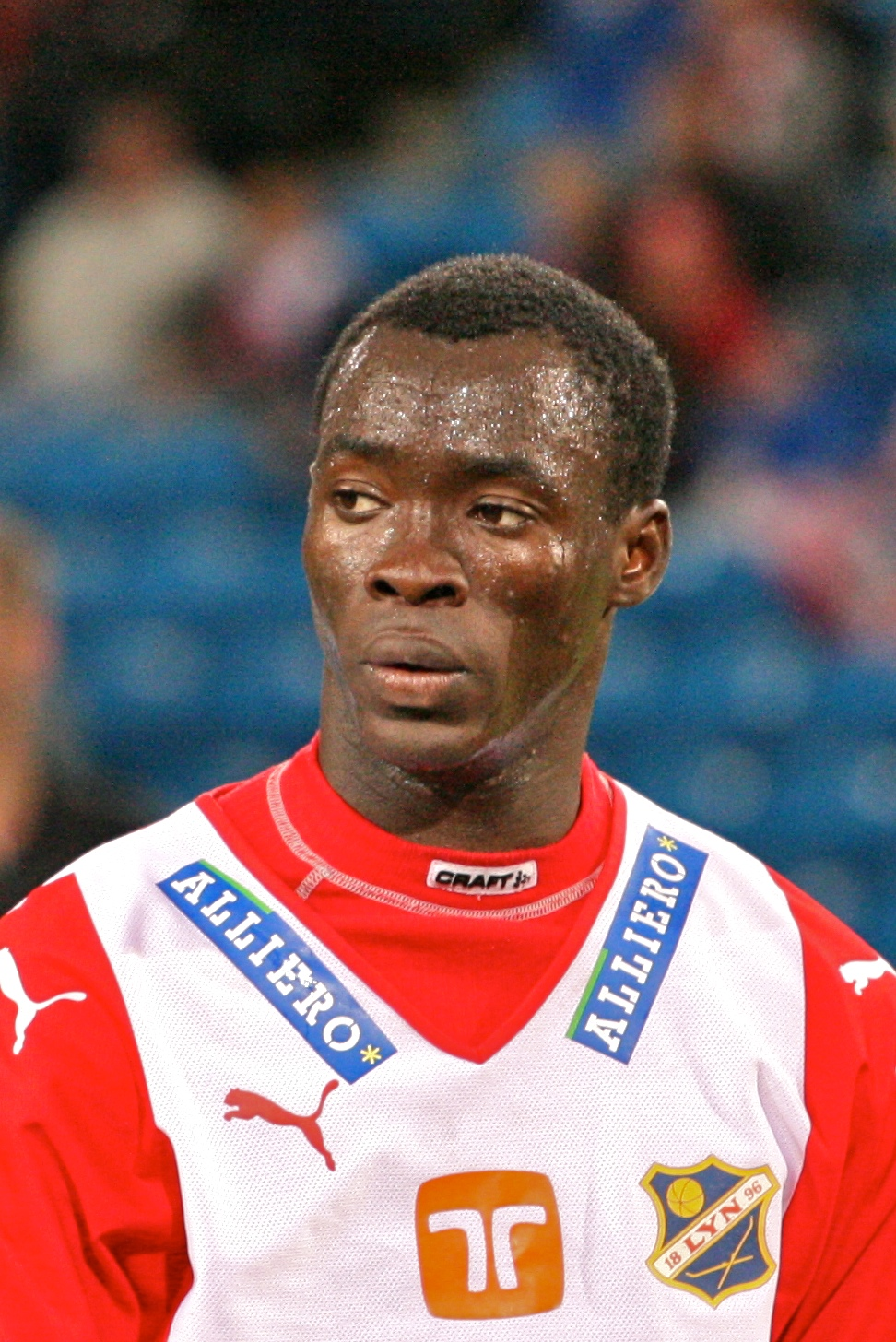
- Angan with Lyn in 2009

Personal information
- Full name: Davy Claude Angan N'Guessan
- Date of birth: 20 September 1987 (age 39)
- Place of birth: Abidjan, Ivory Coast
- Height: 1.82 m (6 ft 0 in)
- Positions: Winger; forward

Team information
- Current team: Kuala Lumpur Rovers

Youth career
- –2006: ES Bingerville

Senior career*
Years	Team	Apps	(Gls)
2007–2008	ES Bingerville	20	(16)
2008–2009	Lyn	21	(6)
2010	Hønefoss	28	(6)
2011–2012	Molde FK	55	(22)
2013–2016	Hangzhou Greentown	93	(26)
2016–2017	Gaziantepspor	18	(1)
2017–2018	Samsunspor	16	(1)
2018–2019	Mosta	8	(4)
2019	Melaka United	8	(3)
2020–	Kuala Lumpur Rovers		
- * Club domestic league appearances and goals

Davy Claude Angan N'Guessan (born 20 September 1987) is an Ivorian professional footballer who plays as a winger or forward for Kuala Lumpur Rovers in the Malaysia M3 League.

== Career ==
Born in Abidjan, Angan played for Entente Sportive de Bingerville, before his transfer to Lyn Oslo in 2008. He signed for Hønefoss BK in 2010.

On 12 January 2011, he moved to Molde FK, and became Ole Gunnar Solskjær's second signing for the club. The transfer fee is estimated to be around 4,000,000 NOK.

Angan signed for Chinese Super League club Hangzhou Greentown on 26 January 2013 with a transfer fee of 12,000,000 NOK being paid to Molde.

In August 2016, Angan joined Gaziantepspor on loan from Hangzhou Greentown, with a view to a permanent deal.

On 23 May 2019, he joined Melaka United during the 2019 Malaysian Super League mid-season transfer window.

== Career statistics ==
As of match played 21 July 2019

Appearances and goals by club, season and competition
Club	Season	League			Cup		Continental		Total	
Club	Season	Division	Apps	Goals	Apps	Goals	Apps	Goals	Apps	Goals
Lyn	2008	Tippeligaen	2	0	1	1	—		3	1
Lyn	2009	Tippeligaen	19	6	2	0	—		21	6
Lyn	Total		21	6	3	1	—		24	7
Hønefoss	2010	Tippeligaen	28	6	4	3	—		32	9
Molde	2011	Tippeligaen	29	9	2	2	—		31	11
Molde	2012	Tippeligaen	26	13	6	6	8	3	40	22
Molde	Total		55	22	8	8	8	3	71	33
Hangzhou Greentown	2013	Chinese Super League	28	9	1	0	—		29	9
Hangzhou Greentown	2014	Chinese Super League	24	9	0	0	—		24	9
Hangzhou Greentown	2015	Chinese Super League	27	4	2	0	—		29	4
Hangzhou Greentown	2016	Chinese Super League	14	4	2	0	—		16	4
Hangzhou Greentown	Total		93	26	5	0	—		98	26
Gaziantepspor	2016–17	Süper Lig	18	1	3	1	—		21	2
Samsunspor	2017–18	TFF First League	14	1	0	0	—		14	1
Mosta	2018–19	Maltese Premier League	8	4	2	1	—		10	5
Melaka United	2019	Malaysia Super League	8	3	0	0	—		8	3
Career total			245	69	25	14	8	3	278	86

== Honours ==
Molde

- Tippeligaen: 2011, 2012

Individual

- Molde top scorer: 22 goals in 2012
