= Khuzaimi Piee =

Malaysian footballer

Personal information
- Full name: Ahmad Khuzaimi bin Piee
- Date of birth: November 11, 1993 (age 32)
- Place of birth: Krubong, Melaka, Malaysia
- Height: 1.80 m (5 ft 11 in)
- Position: Defender

Team information
- Current team: Negeri Sembilan
- Number: 18

Youth career
- 2009: Malacca
- 2010: MP Muar

Senior career*
Years	Team	Apps	(Gls)
2011	Malacca	26	(2)
2012	MP Muar	22	(0)
2013–2014	Malacca	16	(1)
2015–2016	PKNS	8	(0)
2016	→ SAMB (loan)	12	(0)
2016–2019	Melaka United	24	(2)
2018	→ PKNP (loan)	7	(0)
2020–2021	UiTM	20	(0)
2022	Negeri Sembilan	19	(0)
2023–2025	Selangor	15	(0)
2025–	Negeri Sembilan	13	(3)

International career^{‡}
2016–	Malaysia	12	(0)
Medal record
Men's football
Representing Malaysia
Men's football
King's Cup
Runner-up	2022
AFF Championship
Third place	2022
- * Club domestic league appearances and goals as of 14 June 2025 ‡ National team caps and goals as of 21 December 2024

Ahmad Khuzaimi bin Piee (born 11 November 1993), nicknamed Jimmy, is a Malaysian professional footballer who plays as a defender for Malaysia Football League club Negeri Sembilan. He also represent the Malaysia national team.

== Early life ==
Khuzaimi was born in Krubong, Melaka, Malaysia.

== Club career ==
=== Youth ===
Khuzaimi started his football career with the Melaka United (formerly Malacca FA) U-21 in Piala Presiden competition and subsequently transferred to MP Muar.

=== Melaka United ===
Khuzaimi then moved on to Melaka's senior team in the third-tier FAM Cup for two years in 2013 and 2014.

=== PKNS ===
In 2015, he signed a three-year contract with PKNS. In November 2014 he joined PKNS, making 3 league appearances. He only appeared in two games for PKNS before being loaned out to SAMB in early 2016.

=== SAMB (loan) ===
During his time with PKNS he also spent time on loan at SAMB, making 7 league appearances and scoring 3 goals.

=== Return to Melaka United ===
In June 2016 he rejoined Melaka, which saw him playing in the defense with Khair Jones and Shin Jae-pil that led to the Malaysia Premier League championship. He also managed to make 24 league appearances and scored 2 goals.

=== PKNP (loan) ===
He was loaned out by Melaka United to PKNP in early 2018 and returned to Melaka at the end of the season. He made 7 league appearances.

=== UiTM ===
He stated that his performance had been declining with Melaka United in 2019, so he decided to transfer to UiTM in 2020 to regain his form.

=== Negeri Sembilan ===
After UiTM has been relegated to the second-tier Premier League, he joined Negeri Sembilan in 2022 to continue playing in the Super League.

=== Selangor ===
On 20 December 2022, Khuzaimi joined Selangor on a free transfer, following the expiry of his Negeri Sembilan contract.

=== Return to Negeri Sembilan ===
On June 14, 2025, Khuzaimi Piee was announced as a new signing for Negeri Sembilan ahead of the 2025–26 season. He returned to the club after spending two seasons with Selangor, having previously played for Negeri Sembilan in 2022.

== International career ==
In September 2016, Khuzaimi received his first national team call-up for the international friendlies against Singapore and Afghanistan although he was still playing in the second division, Malaysia Premier League. However, he only played in one match where he made his debut for Malaysia against Afghanistan on 11 October 2016, coming on as a substitute for Nazirul Naim in the 68th minute.

He did not play for the national team again for the next six years after his debut. Khuzaimi cites his injuries badly affecting his performance as the reason for not getting called up for a long time.

In March 2022, he was called up again among the 25-man squad against the Philippines, Singapore, and Albirex Niigata Singapore.

== Personal life ==
On 23 May 2024, his house was burgled. He was the fourth Malaysian footballer to be a victim of crime in that month alone.

== Career statistics ==
=== Club ===
As of 8 June 2026

Club	Season	League			Cup		League Cup		Other		Total	
Club	Season	Division	Apps	Goals	Apps	Goals	Apps	Goals	Apps	Goals	Apps	Goals
Malacca	2011	Malaysia FAM League	26	2	0	0	0	0	—		26	2
Malacca	Total		26	2	0	0	0	0	—		26	2
MP Muar	2012	Malaysia Premier League	22	0	0	0	0	0	—		22	0
MP Muar	Total		22	0	0	0	0	0	—		22	0
Malacca	2013	Malaysia FAM League	16	1	0	0	0	0	—		16	0
Malacca	2014	Malaysia FAM League	16	1	0	0	0	0	—		16	0
Malacca	Total		16	1	0	0	0	0	—		16	0
PKNS	2015	Malaysia Premier League	8	0	0	0	0	0	—		8	0
PKNS	Total		8	0	0	0	0	0	—		8	0
SAMB (loan)	2016	Malaysia FAM League	12	0	0	0	0	0	—		12	0
SAMB (loan)	Total		12	0	0	0	0	0	—		12	0
Melaka United	2017	Malaysia Super League	14	2	1	0	0	0	—		15	2
Melaka United	2019	Malaysia Super League	10	0	0	0	0	0	—		10	0
Melaka United	Total		24	2	1	0	0	0	—		25	2
PKNP (loan)	2018	Malaysia Super League	7	0	2	0	0	0	—		9	0
PKNP (loan)	Total		7	0	2	0	0	0	—		9	0
UiTM	2020	Malaysia Super League	5	0	0	0	0	0	—		5	0
UiTM	2021	Malaysia Super League	15	0	0	0	0	0	—		15	0
UiTM	Total		20	0	0	0	0	0	—		20	0
Negeri Sembilan	2022	Malaysia Super League	19	0	1	0	4	0	—		24	0
Negeri Sembilan	Total		19	0	1	0	4	0	—		24	0
Selangor	2023	Malaysia Super League	11	0	3	0	2	0	—		16	0
Selangor	2024–25	Malaysia Super League	4	0	0	0	0	0	2 (Note: MFL Challenge Cup)	0	6	0
Selangor	Total		15	0	3	0	2	0	2	0	22	0
Negeri Sembilan	2025–26	Malaysia Super League	13	3	3	0	3	0	—		19	3
Negeri Sembilan	Total		13	3	3	0	3	0	—		19	3
Career total			182	8	10	0	9	0	2	0	203	8

=== International ===
As of 20 December 2024

Appearances and goals by national team and year
National team	Year	Apps	Goals
Malaysia	2016	1	0
Malaysia	2022	8	0
Malaysia	2024	3	0
Total		12	0

== Honours ==
Melaka United

- Malaysia Premier League: 2016

Selangor

- Malaysia Super League runner-up: 2023
- MFL Challenge Cup: 2024-25
