= Dominik Balić =

Croatian footballer (born 1996)

Personal information
- Date of birth: 4 May 1996 (age 30)
- Place of birth: Split, Croatia
- Height: 1.90 m (6 ft 3 in)
- Position: Midfielder

Team information
- Current team: Dugopolje
- Number: 18

Youth career
- –2007: Dugopolje
- 2007–2009: Hajduk Split
- 2009–2015: Dugopolje

Senior career*
Years	Team	Apps	(Gls)
2015–2019	Dugopolje	98	(4)
2019	Melaka United	7	(0)
2020–2023	Dugopolje	79	(3)
2023	Kelantan United F.C.	16	(1)
2024–	Dugopolje	53	(1)
- * Club domestic league appearances and goals as of 16 June 2026

Dominik Balić (born 4 May 1996) is a Croatian professional footballer who plays as a defender for Dugopolje.
