= Ramzi Haziq =

Malaysian footballer

Personal information
- Full name: Ramzi Haziq bin Mohamad
- Date of birth: 23 December 1994 (age 31)
- Place of birth: Malacca, Malaysia
- Height: 1.70 m (5 ft 7 in)
- Position: Midfielder

Team information
- Current team: Melaka United
- Number: 22

Youth career
- 2014: Harimau Muda B

Senior career*
Years	Team	Apps	(Gls)
2015–2018	Johor Darul Ta'zim II	0	(0)
2019–	Melaka United	3	(0)
- * Club domestic league appearances and goals as of 29 March 2019

Ramzi Haziq bin Mohamad (born 23 December 1994) is a Malaysian footballer who plays for Malaysian club Melaka United as a midfielder. Ramzi nicknamed Rameji Jasin can be described as one of the best midfielder in his era. His tough training with Janmal Jasin now fruitful as out of 14 League Super Matches, the most goal assist belong to him.

In 2014, Ramzi played for Harimau Muda B in Singaporean S.League.
