= 2022 AFC Cup knockout stage =

The 2022 AFC Cup knockout stage was played from 9 August to 22 October 2022. A total of 12 teams competed in the knockout stage to decide the champions of the 2022 AFC Cup.

== Qualified teams ==
The following teams advanced from the group stage:

- The winners of each of the three groups and the best runners-up in the West Asia Zone (Groups A–C) and the ASEAN Zone (Groups G–I), advanced to the Zonal semi-finals.
- The winners of each group in the South Asia Zone (Group D), and the East Asia Zone (Group J) advanced to the Inter-zone play-off semi-finals.
- The winners of each group in the Central Asia Zone (Groups E–F) advanced to the Zonal finals.

Key to colours
Teams which entered the Inter-zone play-off semi-finals
Teams which entered the Zonal finals
Teams which entered the Zonal semi-finals

Zone	Group	Winners	Best runners-up
West Asia Zone	A	(Oman) Al-Seeb	—
West Asia Zone	B	(Kuwait) Al-Arabi	(Bahrain) Al-Riffa
West Asia Zone	C	(Bahrain) East Riffa	—
South Asia Zone	D	(India) ATK Mohun Bagan	—
Central Asia Zone	E	(Uzbekistan) Sogdiana Jizzakh	—
Central Asia Zone	F	(Tajikistan) Khujand	—
ASEAN Zone	G	(Malaysia) Kedah Darul Aman	—
ASEAN Zone	H	(Indonesia) PSM Makassar	(Malaysia) Kuala Lumpur City
ASEAN Zone	I	(Vietnam) Viettel	—
East Asia Zone	J	(Hong Kong) Eastern	—

== Format ==
In the knockout stage, the 12 teams played a single-elimination tournament. The extra time and penalty shoot-out were used to decide the winners if necessary (Regulations Article 9.3 and 10.1).

== Schedule ==
The schedule of each round was as follows.

Round	West Asia	South Asia	Central Asia	ASEAN	East Asia
Zonal semi-finals	5–6 September 2022	Not played		9–10 August 2022	Not played
Zonal finals	4 October 2022	Not played	17 August 2022	24 August 2022	Not played
Inter-zone play-off semi-finals	Not played	6–7 September 2022			
Inter-zone play-off final	Not played	5 October 2022			
Final	22 October 2022				

== Bracket ==
The draw for the Zonal finals and the Inter-zone play-off semi-finals was held on 14 July 2022.

The bracket of the knockout stage was determined as follows:

Zonal semi-finals
(Vietnam) Viettel	0 (5)
(Malaysia) Kuala Lumpur City (p)	0 (6)
(Indonesia) PSM Makassar	2
(Malaysia) Kedah Darul Aman	1
(Kuwait) Al-Arabi	1
(Oman) Al-Seeb (a.e.t.)	2
(Bahrain) East Riffa	1 (4)
(Bahrain) Al-Riffa (p)	1 (5)

Zonal finals
(Tajikistan) Khujand	0
(Uzbekistan) Sogdiana Jizzakh	4
(Malaysia) Kuala Lumpur City	5
(Indonesia) PSM Makassar	2
(Oman) Al-Seeb	4
(Bahrain) Al-Riffa	0

Inter-zone play-off semi-finals
(Uzbekistan) Sogdiana Jizzakh	1
(Hong Kong) Eastern	0
(India) ATK Mohun Bagan	1
(Malaysia) Kuala Lumpur City	3

Inter-zone play-off final
(Uzbekistan) Sogdiana Jizzakh	0 (3)
(Malaysia) Kuala Lumpur City (p)	0 (5)

Final
(Malaysia) Kuala Lumpur City	0
(Oman) Al-Seeb	3

== Zonal semi-finals ==
=== Summary ===
The Zonal semi-finals were played over one leg, with the home team determined by the following tables based on which group runners-up qualified. The group winner hosts the match against a group runner-up. If two group winners played each other, one of the group winners hosted the match.

West Asia Zone
Team 1	Score	Team 2
Al-Arabi (Kuwait)	1–2 (a.e.t.)	(Oman) Al-Seeb
East Riffa (Bahrain)	1–1 (a.e.t.) (4–5 p)	(Bahrain) Al-Riffa

ASEAN Zone
Team 1	Score	Team 2
PSM Makassar (Indonesia)	2–1	(Malaysia) Kedah Darul Aman
Viettel (Vietnam)	0–0 (a.e.t.) (5–6 p)	(Malaysia) Kuala Lumpur City

=== West Asia Zone ===
5 September 2022
20:00 UTC+3

Al-Arabi (Kuwait)	1–2 (a.e.t.)	(Oman) Al-Seeb
Eduwo 112'	Report	Al-Ghassani 95'; Al-Yahyaei 99'

Al Kuwait Sports Club Stadium, Kuwait City
Attendance: 5,200
Referee: Sivakorn Pu-udom (Thailand)

6 September 2022
20:00 UTC+3

East Riffa (Bahrain)	1–1 (a.e.t.)	(Bahrain) Al-Riffa
Shallal 117'	Report	Haram 114'
Penalties
Bodahoom (penalty missed); Al-Shaikh (penalty scored); Shallal (penalty scored); Khelaif (penalty scored); Al-Husaini (penalty scored); Abdulnabi (penalty missed)	4–5	(penalty scored) Haram; (penalty scored) Al-Romaihi; (penalty scored) Marhoon; (penalty scored) Al-Malki; (penalty missed) Al-Aswad; (penalty scored) Derrardja

Al Muharraq Stadium, Arad
Attendance: 2,554
Referee: Kim Woo-sung (South Korea)

=== ASEAN Zone ===
9 August 2022
19:00 UTC+8

PSM Makassar (Indonesia)	2–1	(Malaysia) Kedah Darul Aman
Yakob 31'; Fernandes 54'	Report	Fayadh 86'

Kapten I Wayan Dipta Stadium, Gianyar
Attendance: 368
Referee: Akhrol Risquallev (Uzbekistan)
10 August 2022
18:00 UTC+7

Viettel (Vietnam)	0–0 (a.e.t.)	(Malaysia) Kuala Lumpur City
	Report
Penalties
Nguyễn Hoàng Đức (penalty scored); Hồ Khắc Ngọc (penalty scored); Nhâm Mạnh Dũng (penalty scored); Trần Danh Trung (penalty missed); Phan Tuấn Tài (penalty scored); Dương Văn Hào (penalty scored); Bùi Duy Thường (penalty missed)	5–6	(penalty scored) Josué; (penalty missed) Irfan; (penalty scored) Hadin; (penalty scored) Morales; (penalty scored) Gallifuoco; (penalty scored) Zhafri; (penalty scored) Akram

Thống Nhất Stadium, Ho Chi Minh City
Attendance: 3,016
Referee: Ahmed Al-Kaf (Oman)

== Zonal finals ==
=== Summary ===
The Zonal finals were played over one leg, with the home team decided by draw. The winners of the West Asia Zonal final advanced to the final, while the winners of the Central Asia Zonal final and ASEAN Zonal final advanced to the Inter-zone play-off semi-finals.

West Asia Zone
Team 1	Score	Team 2
Al-Seeb (Oman)	4–0	(Bahrain) Al-Riffa

Central Asia Zone
Team 1	Score	Team 2
Khujand (Tajikistan)	0–4	(Uzbekistan) Sogdiana Jizzakh

ASEAN Zone
Team 1	Score	Team 2
Kuala Lumpur City (Malaysia)	5–2	(Indonesia) PSM Makassar

=== West Asia Zone ===
4 October 2022
19:00 UTC+4

Al-Seeb (Oman)	4–0	(Bahrain) Al-Riffa
Al-Muqbali 47'; Al-Siyabi 62'; Al-Yahyaei 79'; Dauda 90+2'	Report

Al-Seeb Stadium, Seeb
Attendance: 11,680
Referee: Jumpei Iida (Japan)

=== Central Asia Zone ===
17 August 2022
15:30 UTC+5

Khujand (Tajikistan)	0–4	(Uzbekistan) Sogdiana Jizzakh
	Report	Hasanov 13', 21'; Norkhonov 29'; Kahramonov 78'

20 Years of Independence Stadium, Khujand
Attendance: 5,600
Referee: Kim Hee-gon (South Korea)

=== ASEAN Zone ===
24 August 2022
21:00 UTC+8

Kuala Lumpur City (Malaysia)	5–2	(Indonesia) PSM Makassar
Morales 33'; Mintah 45+2'; Josué 52' (pen.), 84'; Hadin 90+4' (pen.)	Report	Sayuri 58'; Tanjung 63'

Kuala Lumpur Stadium, Kuala Lumpur
Attendance: 2,905
Referee: Yusuke Araki (Japan)

== Inter-zone play-off semi-finals ==
=== Summary ===
In the Inter-zone play-off semi-finals, the four zonal winners other than the West Asia Zone played in two ties, i.e., the winners of the South Asia Zone (Group D), the winners of the East Asia Zone (Group J), the winners of the Central Zonal final, and the winners of the ASEAN Zonal final, with the matchups and home team decided by draw, without any seeding.

Team 1	Score	Team 2
Sogdiana Jizzakh (Uzbekistan)	1–0	(Hong Kong) Eastern
ATK Mohun Bagan (India)	1–3	(Malaysia) Kuala Lumpur City

=== Matches ===
6 September 2022
18:00 UTC+5

Sogdiana Jizzakh (Uzbekistan)	1–0	(Hong Kong) Eastern
Norkhonov 85'	Report

Sogdiyona Sport Majmuasi, Jizzakh
Attendance: 7,150
Referee: Ahmed Al Alili (United Arab Emirates)

7 September 2022
19:00 UTC+5:30

ATK Mohun Bagan (India)	1–3	(Malaysia) Kuala Lumpur City
Fardin Ali Molla 90'	Report	Josué 60'; Fakrul 90+2'; Morales 90+5'

Vivekananda Yuba Bharati Krirangan, Kolkata
Attendance: 18,594
Referee: Khalid Al-Turais (Saudi Arabia)

== Inter-zone play-off final ==
=== Summary ===
In the Inter-zone play-off final, the two winners of the Inter-zone play-off semi-finals played each other, with the home team determined by the Inter-zone play-off semi-final draw. The winners of the Inter-zone play-off final advanced to the final.

Team 1	Score	Team 2
Sogdiana Jizzakh (Uzbekistan)	0–0 (a.e.t.) (3–5 p)	(Malaysia) Kuala Lumpur City

=== Match ===
5 October 2022
18:00 UTC+5

Sogdiana Jizzakh (Uzbekistan)	0–0 (a.e.t.)	(Malaysia) Kuala Lumpur City
	Report
Penalties
Kakhramonov (penalty scored); Jurabekov (penalty missed); Čermelj (penalty scored); Gafurov (penalty scored)	3–5	(penalty scored) Josué; (penalty scored) Morales; (penalty scored) Hadin; (penalty scored) Akram; (penalty scored) Gallifuoco

Sogdiyona Sport Majmuasi, Jizzakh
Attendance: 6,157
Referee: Ali Sabah (Iraq)

== Final ==
The final was played over one leg at the Bukit Jalil National Stadium in Kuala Lumpur, Malaysia, between the winners of the Inter-zone play-off final, Kuala Lumpur City, and the winners of the West Asia Zonal final, Al-Seeb.

22 October 2022
19:00 UTC+8

Kuala Lumpur City (Malaysia)	0–3	(Oman) Al-Seeb
	Report	Al-Busaidi 22'; Al-Muqbali 37'; Al-Ghassani 69'

Bukit Jalil National Stadium, Kuala Lumpur
Attendance: 27,722
Referee: Shaun Evans (Australia)
