= 2022 AFC Cup group stage =

AFC Cup group stage

The 2022 AFC Cup group stage was played from 18 May to 30 June 2022. A total of 39 teams competed in the group stage to decide the 12 places in the knockout stage of the 2022 AFC Cup.

== Draw ==
The draw for the group stage was held on 17 January 2022 at AFC House in Kuala Lumpur, Malaysia. The 39 teams were drawn into nine groups of four and one group of three (in the Central Asia Zone): three groups each in the West Asia Zone (Groups A–C) and the ASEAN Zone (Groups G–I), two groups in the Central Asia Zone (Groups E–F), and one group each in the South Asia Zone (Group D) and the East Asia Zone (Group J). For each zone, teams were seeded into four pots and drawn into the relevant positions within each group, based on their association ranking and their seeding within their association, in consideration of technical balance between groups. Teams from the same association in zones with more than one group (West Asia Zone, Central Asia Zone, and ASEAN Zone) could not be drawn into the same group.

Zone	Groups	Pot 1	Pot 2	Pot 3	Pot 4
West Asia Zone	A–C	(Lebanon) Al-Ansar	(Oman) Al-Seeb	(Syria) Jableh	(Palestine) Hilal Al-Quds
West Asia Zone	A–C	(Syria) Tishreen	(Palestine) Shabab Al-Khalil	(Bahrain) East Riffa	(Kuwait) Al-Arabi
West Asia Zone	A–C	(Bahrain) Al-Riffa	(Lebanon) Nejmeh	(Oman) Dhofar	Al-Kuwait
South Asia Zone	D	(India) Gokulam Kerala	(Bangladesh) Bashundhara Kings	(Maldives) Maziya	(India) ATK Mohun Bagan (Winners of South Asia Play-off)
Central Asia Zone	E–F	(Uzbekistan) Sogdiana Jizzakh ~~(Nasaf Qarshi)~~ (Note: The standby teams would replace a team from the same association which played in the AFC Champions League qualifying play-offs and advanced to the AFC Champions League group stage. Since Nasaf Qarshi advanced from the AFC Champions League qualifying play-offs to the group stage, Sogdiana Jizzakh, which were the standby team from Uzbekistan, replaced Nasaf Qarshi in the AFC Cup group stage.)	(Turkmenistan) Altyn Asyr	(Tajikistan) CSKA Pamir Dushanbe	(Kyrgyzstan) Neftchi
Central Asia Zone	E–F	(Tajikistan) Khujand	(Kyrgyzstan) Dordoi	(Turkmenistan) Köpetdag	—N/a
ASEAN Zone	G–I	(Philippines) Kaya F.C.–Iloilo	(Singapore) Hougang United	(Cambodia) Phnom Penh Crown	(Laos) Young Elephants ( ~~(Myanmar) Hantharwady United~~) (Note: On 19 January 2022, the AFC announced that the two teams from Myanmar, Shan United and Hanthawaddy United, withdrew from the group stage after the draw. As a result, on 1 March 2022, the AFC decided to cancel the ASEAN zone play-off round match between Visakha FC and Young Elephants, and promote both the participating teams to the group stage to fill the vacant group stage spots.)
ASEAN Zone	G–I	(Vietnam) Viettel	(Myanmar) ~~Shan United~~	(Malaysia) Kedah Darul Aman	(Indonesia) PSM Makassar
ASEAN Zone	G–I	(Malaysia) Kuala Lumpur City	(Indonesia) Bali United	(Singapore) Tampines Rovers	(Cambodia) Visakha FC (~~Winners of ASEAN Play-off~~)
East Asia Zone	J	(Hong Kong) Eastern	(Macau) ~~MUST CPK~~ (Note: MUST CPK withdrew from the competition due to travel restrictions as a result of the recent lockdown measures enforced in Macau due to the COVID-19 pandemic.)	(Chinese Taipei) Tainan City	(Hong Kong) Lee Man (Winners of East Asia Play-off)

Standby teams

- ~~(Myanmar) Ayeyawady United (for Shan United)~~

== Format ==
In the group stage, each group is played on a single round-robin basis in centralised venues. The following teams will advance to the knockout stage:

- The winners of each group and the best runners-up in the West Asia Zone and the ASEAN Zone advance to the Zonal semi-finals.
- The winners of each group in the Central Asia Zone advance to the Zonal finals.
- The winners of each group in the South Asia Zone and the East Asia Zone advance to the Inter-zone play-off semi-finals.

=== Tiebreakers ===
The teams are ranked according to points (3 points for a win, 1 point for a draw, 0 points for a loss). If tied on points, tiebreakers were applied in the following order (Regulations Article 8.3):

1. Points in head-to-head matches among tied teams;
2. Goal difference in head-to-head matches among tied teams;
3. Goals scored in head-to-head matches among tied teams;
4. ~~Away goals scored in head-to-head matches among tied teams~~ (Not applicable since matches will be played in centralised venues);
5. If more than two teams are tied, and after applying all head-to-head criteria above, a subset of teams are still tied, all head-to-head criteria above are reapplied exclusively to this subset of teams;
6. Goal difference in all group matches;
7. Goals scored in all group matches;
8. Penalty shoot-out if only two teams playing each other in the last round of the group are tied;
9. Disciplinary points (yellow card = 1 point, red card as a result of two yellow cards = 3 points, direct red card = 3 points, yellow card followed by direct red card = 4 points);
10. Association ranking;
11. Drawing of lots.

== Schedule ==
The schedule of each matchday was as follows.

Matchday	Dates					Matches	
Matchday	West	South	Central	ASEAN	East	Four-team groups	Three-team group
Matchday 1	18 May 2022		24 June 2022			1 v 4, 2 v 3	3 v 1
Matchday 2	21 May 2022		27 June 2022			4 v 2, 3 v 1	2 v 3
Matchday 3	24 May 2022		30 June 2022			1 v 2, 3 v 4	1 v 2

=== Centralised venues ===
On 24 February 2022, AFC confirmed hosts for the group stage. on 25 April 2022, the Chinese Taipei Football Association withdrew from hosting the Group J matches. Later, on 5 May, Buriram were declared as the centralised venue to host the Group J matches.

- Group A: Muscat, Oman (Al-Seeb Stadium)
- Group B: Kuwait City, Kuwait (Al Kuwait Sports Club Stadium)
- Group C: Arad, Bahrain (Al Muharraq Stadium)
- Group D: Kolkata, India (Vivekananda Yuba Bharati Krirangan)
- Group E: Dushanbe, Tajikistan (Pamir Stadium)
- Group F: Bishkek, Kyrgyzstan (Dolen Omurzakov Stadium)
- Group G: Gianyar, Indonesia (Kapten I Wayan Dipta Stadium)
- Group H: Kuala Lumpur, Malaysia (Kuala Lumpur Stadium)
- Group I: Ho Chi Minh City, Vietnam (Thống Nhất Stadium)
- Group J: Buriram, Thailand (Buriram Stadium)

== Groups ==
=== Group A ===
Pos	Team	Pld	W	D	L	GF	GA	GD	Pts	Qualification	SEB	KSC	JAB	ANS
1	(Oman) Al-Seeb (H)	3	2	0	1	6	2	+4	6	Zonal semi-finals	—	—	1–0	—
2	Al-Kuwait	3	1	2	0	3	2	+1	5		2–1	—	—	—
3	(Syria) Jableh	3	1	1	1	1	1	0	4		—	0–0	—	1–0
4	(Lebanon) Al-Ansar	3	0	1	2	1	6	−5	1		0–4	1–1	—	—

Source: AFC
Rules for classification: Tiebreakers
(H) Hosts
18 May 2022
19:00 UTC+4

Al-Seeb (Oman)	1–0	(Syria) Jableh
Al-Farsi 45+1'	Report

Al-Seeb Stadium, Muscat
Attendance: 2,700
Referee: Mohamed Javiz (Maldives)
18 May 2022
23:00 UTC+4

Al-Ansar (Lebanon)	1–1	Al-Kuwait
Siaj 75'	Report	Khenissi 27'

Al-Seeb Stadium, Muscat
Attendance: 77
Referee: Abdulla Al-Marri (Qatar)

21 May 2022
19:00 UTC+4

Al-Kuwait	2–1	(Oman) Al-Seeb
Khenissi 45+1'; Hammoud 64'	Report	Al-Ghassani 45+5'

Al-Seeb Stadium, Muscat
Attendance: 2,843
Referee: Ma Ning (China)
21 May 2022
23:00 UTC+4

Jableh (Syria)	1–0	(Lebanon) Al-Ansar
Jwayed 90+3'	Report

Al-Seeb Stadium, Muscat
Attendance: 135
Referee: Payam Heidari (Iran)

24 May 2022
19:00 UTC+4

Al-Ansar (Lebanon)	0–4	(Oman) Al-Seeb
	Report	Al-Braiki 11', 44'; Al-Farsi 40'; Al-Busaidi 89' (pen.)

Al-Seeb Stadium, Muscat
Attendance: 1,225
Referee: Yudai Yamamoto (Japan)
24 May 2022
23:00 UTC+4

Jableh (Syria)	0–0	Al-Kuwait
	Report

Al-Seeb Stadium, Muscat
Attendance: 135
Referee: Sadullo Gulmurodi (Tajikistan)

=== Group B ===
Pos	Team	Pld	W	D	L	GF	GA	GD	Pts	Qualification	ARA	RIF	DHO	SAK
1	(Kuwait) Al-Arabi (H)	3	2	1	0	5	3	+2	7	Zonal semi-finals	—	—	—	1–0
2	(Bahrain) Al-Riffa	3	2	0	1	8	6	+2	6	Zonal semi-finals	2–3	—	—	3–1
3	(Oman) Dhofar	3	1	1	1	6	4	+2	4		1–1	2–3	—	—
4	(Palestine) Shabab Al-Khalil	3	0	0	3	1	7	−6	0		—	—	0–3	—

Source: AFC
Rules for classification: Tiebreakers
(H) Hosts
18 May 2022
18:00 UTC+3

Al-Riffa (Bahrain)	2–3	(Kuwait) Al-Arabi
Saeed 24'; Al-Shaikh 34'	Report	Khalaf 45'; Mbengue 59'; Al-Fadhel 74'

Al Kuwait Sports Club Stadium, Kuwait City
Attendance: 4,300
Referee: Thoriq Alkatiri (Indonesia)
18 May 2022
22:00 UTC+3

Shabab Al-Khalil (Palestine)	0–3	(Oman) Dhofar
	Report	Awadh 11'; Al-Malki 57'; Al-Shahri 77'

Al Kuwait Sports Club Stadium, Kuwait City
Attendance: 110
Referee: Sayyodjon Zainiddinov (Tajikistan)

21 May 2022
18:00 UTC+3

Al-Arabi (Kuwait)	1–0	(Palestine) Shabab Al-Khalil
Mbengue 34'	Report

Al Kuwait Sports Club Stadium, Kuwait City
Attendance: 3,700
Referee: Razlan Joffri Ali (Malaysia)
21 May 2022
22:00 UTC+3

Dhofar (Oman)	2–3	(Bahrain) Al-Riffa
Al-Malki 13'; Al-Maashani 60'	Report	Al-Aswad 1', 90+1' (pen.); Isa 9'

Al Kuwait Sports Club Stadium, Kuwait City
Attendance: 123
Referee: Majed Al Shamrani (Saudi Arabia)

24 May 2022
18:00 UTC+3

Dhofar (Oman)	1–1	(Kuwait) Al-Arabi
Al-Nahar 19'	Report	Mbengue 32'

Al Kuwait Sports Club Stadium, Kuwait City
Attendance: 2,469
Referee: Pranjal Banerjee (India)
24 May 2022
22:00 UTC+3

Al-Riffa (Bahrain)	3–1	(Palestine) Shabab Al-Khalil
Fawaz 22'; Al-Aswad 71'; Isa 90+1'	Report	Darwish 76'

Al Kuwait Sports Club Stadium, Kuwait City
Attendance: 65
Referee: Akhrol Riskullaev (Uzbekistan)

=== Group C ===
Pos	Team	Pld	W	D	L	GF	GA	GD	Pts	Qualification	EAR	TIS	NEJ	HAQ
1	(Bahrain) East Riffa (H)	3	1	2	0	5	3	+2	5	Zonal semi-finals	—	2–0	—	2–2
2	(Syria) Tishreen	3	1	1	1	3	3	0	4 (Note: Head-to-head points: Tishreen 3, Nejmeh 0.)		—	—	3–1	0–0
3	(Lebanon) Nejmeh	3	1	1	1	4	4	0	4		1–1	—	—	—
4	(Palestine) Hilal Al-Quds	3	0	2	1	2	4	−2	2		—	—	0–2	—

Source: AFC
Rules for classification: Tiebreakers
(H) Hosts
Notes:
18 May 2022
18:00 UTC+3

Tishreen (Syria)	0–0	(Palestine) Hilal Al-Quds
	Report

Al Muharraq Stadium, Arad
Attendance: 118
Referee: Zaid Thamer (Iraq)
18 May 2022
22:00 UTC+3

Nejmeh (Lebanon)	1–1	(Bahrain) East Riffa
Alaaeddine 64' (pen.)	Report	Bodahoom 76'

Al Muharraq Stadium, Arad
Attendance: 485
Referee: Chae Sang-hyeop (South Korea)

21 May 2022
18:00 UTC+3

Hilal Al-Quds (Palestine)	0–2	(Lebanon) Nejmeh
	Report	Sarr 53'; Alaaeddine 90+1'

Al Muharraq Stadium, Arad
Attendance: 111
Referee: Rowan Arumughan (India)
21 May 2022
22:00 UTC+3

East Riffa (Bahrain)	2–0	(Syria) Tishreen
Al-Husaini 45+2'; Aggreh 90+1'	Report

Al Muharraq Stadium, Arad
Attendance: 550
Referee: Tam Ping Wun (Hong Kong)

24 May 2022
18:00 UTC+3

Tishreen (Syria)	3–1	(Lebanon) Nejmeh
Bashmani 26'; Sabagh 42'; Koaeh 45+1'	Report	Ansah 70'

Al Muharraq Stadium, Arad
Attendance: 78
Referee: Fu Ming (China)
24 May 2022
22:00 UTC+3

East Riffa (Bahrain)	2–2	(Palestine) Hilal Al-Quds
Khelaif 50'; Fernando 73' (pen.)	Report	Maraaba 24', 38'

Al Muharraq Stadium, Arad
Attendance: 604
Referee: Shukri Al-Hunfush (Saudi Arabia)

=== Group D ===
Pos	Team	Pld	W	D	L	GF	GA	GD	Pts	Qualification	MBSG	BSK	MAZ	GOK
1	(India) ATK Mohun Bagan (H)	3	2	0	1	11	6	+5	6 (Note: Head-to-head points: ATK Mohun Bagan 3, Bashundhara Kings 0.)	Inter-zone play-off semi-finals	—	4–0	—	—
2	(Bangladesh) Bashundhara Kings	3	2	0	1	3	5	−2	6		—	—	1–0	—
3	(Maldives) Maziya	3	1	0	2	3	6	−3	3 (Note: Head-to-head points: Maziya 3, Gokulam Kerala 0.)		2–5	—	—	1–0
4	(India) Gokulam Kerala	3	1	0	2	5	5	0	3		4–2	1–2	—	—

Source: AFC
Rules for classification: Tiebreakers
(H) Hosts
Notes:
18 May 2022
16:30 UTC+5:30

Gokulam Kerala (India)	4–2	(India) ATK Mohun Bagan
Majcen 50', 65'; Rishad 57'; Jithin 89'	Report	Kotal 53'; Colaco 80'

Vivekananda Yuba Bharati Krirangan, Kolkata
Attendance: 31,790
Referee: Seyed Vahid Kazemi (Iran)
18 May 2022
20:30 UTC+5:30

Bashundhara Kings (Bangladesh)	1–0	(Maldives) Maziya
Marong 33'	Report

Vivekananda Yuba Bharati Krirangan, Kolkata
Attendance: 259
Referee: Yudi Nurcahya (Indonesia)

21 May 2022
16:30 UTC+5:30

ATK Mohun Bagan (India)	4–0	(Bangladesh) Bashundhara Kings
Colaco 25', 34', 53'; Williams 77'	Report

Vivekananda Yuba Bharati Krirangan, Kolkata
Attendance: 34,595
Referee: Chen Hsin-chuan (Chinese Taipei)
21 May 2022
20:30 UTC+5:30

Maziya (Maldives)	1–0	(India) Gokulam Kerala
Stewart 50'	Report

Vivekananda Yuba Bharati Krirangan, Kolkata
Attendance: 395
Referee: Baraa Aisha (Palestine)

24 May 2022
16:30 UTC+5:30

Gokulam Kerala (India)	1–2	(Bangladesh) Bashundhara Kings
Fletcher 75'	Report	Robinho 36'; Marong 54'

Vivekananda Yuba Bharati Krirangan, Kolkata
Attendance: 497
Referee: Masoud Tufaylieh (Syria)
24 May 2022
20:30 UTC+5:30

Maziya (Maldives)	2–5	(India) ATK Mohun Bagan
Tana 45', 73'	Report	Kauko 26', 37'; Krishna 56'; Bose 58'; McHugh 71'

Vivekananda Yuba Bharati Krirangan, Kolkata
Attendance: 33,729
Referee: Abdul Hakim Haidi (Brunei)

=== Group E ===
Pos	Team	Pld	W	D	L	GF	GA	GD	Pts	Qualification	SOG	ALT	CPD	NEF
1	(Uzbekistan) Sogdiana Jizzakh	3	3	0	0	8	3	+5	9	Zonal finals	—	3–1	—	2–0
2	(Turkmenistan) Altyn Asyr	3	1	1	1	3	4	−1	4		—	—	1–1	—
3	(Tajikistan) CSKA Pamir Dushanbe (H)	3	0	2	1	3	4	−1	2		2–3	—	—	0–0
4	(Kyrgyzstan) Neftchi	3	0	1	2	0	3	−3	1		—	0–1	—	—

Source: AFC
Rules for classification: Tiebreakers
(H) Hosts
24 June 2022
19:00 UTC+5

Sogdiana Jizzakh (Uzbekistan)	2–0	(Kyrgyzstan) Neftchi
Čermelj 45+2'; Kolaković 53'	Report

Pamir Stadium, Dushanbe
Attendance: 840
Referee: C. R. Srikrishna (India)
24 June 2022
22:00 UTC+5

Altyn Asyr (Turkmenistan)	1–1	(Tajikistan) CSKA Pamir Dushanbe
Rashidbekov 85' (o.g.)	Report	Sharipov 90+3'

Pamir Stadium, Dushanbe
Attendance: 5,720
Referee: Suhaizi Shukri (Malaysia)

27 June 2022
19:00 UTC+5

Neftchi (Kyrgyzstan)	0–1	(Turkmenistan) Altyn Asyr
	Report	Annaýew 34' (pen.)

Pamir Stadium, Dushanbe
Attendance: 801
Referee: Ngô Duy Lân (Vietnam)
27 June 2022
22:00 UTC+5

CSKA Pamir Dushanbe (Tajikistan)	2–3	(Uzbekistan) Sogdiana Jizzakh
Rashidbekov 31'; Dzhuraev 50' (pen.)	Report	Norkhonov 3', 46'; Hasanov 45'

Pamir Stadium, Dushanbe
Attendance: 6,300
Referee: Khaled Al-Shaqsi (Oman)

30 June 2022
19:00 UTC+5

Sogdiana Jizzakh (Uzbekistan)	3–1	(Turkmenistan) Altyn Asyr
Hasanov 20', 59'; Kahramonov 48'	Report	Rozyýew 65'

Pamir Stadium, Dushanbe
Attendance: 850
Referee: Ali Abdulnabi (Bahrain)
30 June 2022
22:00 UTC+5

CSKA Pamir Dushanbe (Tajikistan)	0–0	(Kyrgyzstan) Neftchi
	Report

Pamir Stadium, Dushanbe
Attendance: 5,750
Referee: Bold Khash-Erdene (Mongolia)

=== Group F ===
Pos	Team	Pld	W	D	L	GF	GA	GD	Pts	Qualification	KHU	KPD	DOR
1	(Tajikistan) Khujand	2	1	1	0	3	1	+2	4	Zonal finals	—	—	0–0
2	(Turkmenistan) Köpetdag	2	1	0	1	2	3	−1	3		1–3	—	—
3	(Kyrgyzstan) Dordoi (H)	2	0	1	1	0	1	−1	1		—	0–1	—

Source: AFC
Rules for classification: Tiebreakers
(H) Hosts
24 June 2022
20:00 UTC+6

Köpetdag (Turkmenistan)	1–3	(Tajikistan) Khujand
Akmämmedow 58'	Report	Yodgorov 3', 7'; Malodustov 85'

Dolen Omurzakov Stadium, Bishkek
Attendance: 251
Referee: Thoriq Alkatiri (Indonesia)

27 June 2022
20:00 UTC+6

Dordoi (Kyrgyzstan)	0–1	(Turkmenistan) Köpetdag
	Report	Berdiýew 45'

Dolen Omurzakov Stadium, Bishkek
Attendance: 3,500
Referee: Nivon Robesh Gamini (Sri Lanka)

30 June 2022
20:00 UTC+6

Khujand (Tajikistan)	0–0	(Kyrgyzstan) Dordoi
	Report

Dolen Omurzakov Stadium, Bishkek
Attendance: 2,689
Referee: Nazmi Nasaruddin (Malaysia)

=== Group G ===
Pos	Team	Pld	W	D	L	GF	GA	GD	Pts	Qualification	KED	VIS	BAL	KAY
1	(Malaysia) Kedah Darul Aman	3	2	0	1	9	4	+5	6 (Note: Head-to-head standings: Tied on head-to-head points.; Head-to-head goal difference: Kedah Darul Aman: +2, Visakha FC –1, Bali United –1.; Head-to-head goals scored: Visakha FC 6, Bali United 4.)	Zonal semi-finals	—	5–1	—	4–1
2	(Cambodia) Visakha FC	3	2	0	1	8	8	0	6		—	—	5–2	—
3	(Indonesia) Bali United (H)	3	2	0	1	5	5	0	6		2–0	—	—	—
4	(Philippines) Kaya F.C.–Iloilo	3	0	0	3	2	7	−5	0		—	1–2	0–1	—

Source: AFC
Rules for classification: Tiebreakers
(H) Hosts
Notes:
24 June 2022
17:00 UTC+8

Kaya F.C.–Iloilo (Philippines)	1–2	(Cambodia) Visakha FC
Amita 30'	Report	Chansopheak 47'; Ty 59'

Kapten I Wayan Dipta Stadium, Gianyar
Attendance: 821
Referee: Abdul Hakim Haidi (Brunei)
24 June 2022
21:00 UTC+8

Bali United (Indonesia)	2–0	(Malaysia) Kedah Darul Aman
Ngah 45+2' (o.g.); Rahmat 82'	Report

Kapten I Wayan Dipta Stadium, Gianyar
Attendance: 9,832
Referee: Akhrol Riskullaev (Uzbekistan)

27 June 2022
17:00 UTC+8

Visakha FC (Cambodia)	5–2	(Indonesia) Bali United
Victor 17', 63'; Sovann 45', 88'; Lee Jae-gun 55'	Report	Irfan 9'; Mbarga 85'

Kapten I Wayan Dipta Stadium, Gianyar
Attendance: 5,669
Referee: Mohamed Javiz (Maldives)
27 June 2022
21:00 UTC+8

Kedah Darul Aman (Malaysia)	4–1	(Philippines) Kaya F.C.–Iloilo
Fayadh 57', 90+3'; Al-Mardi 63'; Ngah 82'	Report	Gayoso 86'

Kapten I Wayan Dipta Stadium, Gianyar
Attendance: 100
Referee: Payam Heidari (Iran)

30 June 2022
17:00 UTC+8

Kaya F.C.–Iloilo (Philippines)	0–1	(Indonesia) Bali United
	Report	Jajang 25'

Kapten I Wayan Dipta Stadium, Gianyar
Attendance: 5,069
Referee: Shukri Al-Hunfush (Saudi Arabia)
30 June 2022
21:00 UTC+8

Kedah Darul Aman (Malaysia)	5–1	(Cambodia) Visakha FC
Al-Mardi 28', 45+2', 54'; Fayadh 67'; Ngah 76'	Report	Khan 20'

Kapten I Wayan Dipta Stadium, Gianyar
Attendance: 100
Referee: Ahmed Al-Ali (Jordan)

=== Group H ===
Pos	Team	Pld	W	D	L	GF	GA	GD	Pts	Qualification	PSM	KLC	TAM
1	(Indonesia) PSM Makassar	2	1	1	0	3	1	+2	4 (Note: Tied on head-to-head results. Overall goal difference used as tiebreaker.)	Zonal semi-finals	—	0–0	—
2	(Malaysia) Kuala Lumpur City (H)	2	1	1	0	2	1	+1	4	Zonal semi-finals	—	—	2–1
3	(Singapore) Tampines Rovers	2	0	0	2	2	5	−3	0		1–3	—	—

Source: AFC
Rules for classification: Tiebreakers
(H) Hosts
Notes:
24 June 2022
20:00 UTC+8

PSM Makassar (Indonesia)	0–0	(Malaysia) Kuala Lumpur City
	Report

Kuala Lumpur Stadium, Kuala Lumpur
Attendance: 1,259
Referee: Qasim Al-Hatmi (Oman)

27 June 2022
20:00 UTC+8

Tampines Rovers (Singapore)	1–3	(Indonesia) PSM Makassar
Mehmedović 29'	Report	Rizky 48'; Everton 79', 90+4' (pen.)

Kuala Lumpur Stadium, Kuala Lumpur
Attendance: 302
Referee: Seyed Vahid Kazemi (Iran)

30 June 2022
20:00 UTC+8

Kuala Lumpur City (Malaysia)	2–1	(Singapore) Tampines Rovers
Josué 16', 21'	Report	Kopitović 37'

Kuala Lumpur Stadium, Kuala Lumpur
Attendance: 1,354
Referee: Masoud Tufaylieh (Syria)

=== Group I ===
Pos	Team	Pld	W	D	L	GF	GA	GD	Pts	Qualification	VIE	HOU	PPC	YEL
1	(Vietnam) Viettel (H)	3	3	0	0	11	3	+8	9	Zonal semi-finals	—	5–2	—	5–1
2	(Singapore) Hougang United	3	2	0	1	9	9	0	6		—	—	4–3	—
3	(Cambodia) Phnom Penh Crown	3	1	0	2	7	7	0	3		0–1	—	—	4–2
4	(Laos) Young Elephants	3	0	0	3	4	12	−8	0		—	1–3	—	—

Source: AFC
Rules for classification: Tiebreakers
(H) Hosts
24 June 2022
17:00 UTC+7

Viettel (Vietnam)	5–1	(Laos) Young Elephants
Paulo 33', 40', 70'; Nguyễn Đức Hoàng Minh 44'; Nhâm Mạnh Dũng 82'	Report	Bounkong 6'

Thống Nhất Stadium, Ho Chi Minh City
Attendance: 1,135
Referee: Feras Taweel (Syria)
24 June 2022
21:00 UTC+7

Hougang United (Singapore)	4–3	(Cambodia) Phnom Penh Crown
Bortoluzo 21'; Recha 29'; Pisa 37' (o.g.); Moritz 60'	Report	Chanchav 15'; Thiva 19'; Pisa 90+2'

Thống Nhất Stadium, Ho Chi Minh City
Attendance: 368
Referee: Casey Reibelt (Australia)

27 June 2022
17:00 UTC+7

Phnom Penh Crown (Cambodia)	0–1	(Vietnam) Viettel
	Report	Bùi Duy Thường 9'

Thống Nhất Stadium, Ho Chi Minh City
Attendance: 1,206
Referee: Rowan Arumughan (India)
27 June 2022
21:00 UTC+7

Young Elephants (Laos)	1–3	(Singapore) Hougang United
Bounkong 5'	Report	Sahil 45+1', 65'; Bortoluzo 78'

Thống Nhất Stadium, Ho Chi Minh City
Attendance: 388
Referee: Sayyodjon Zainiddinov (Tajikistan)

30 June 2022
17:00 UTC+7

Viettel (Vietnam)	5–2	(Singapore) Hougang United
Paulo 41' (pen.), 43' (pen.); Nguyễn Đức Hoàng Minh 55'; Magno 70', 72'	Report	Bortoluzo 15' (pen.), 45+1' (pen.)

Thống Nhất Stadium, Ho Chi Minh City
Attendance: 1,555
Referee: Ali Reda (Lebanon)
30 June 2022
21:00 UTC+7

Phnom Penh Crown (Cambodia)	4–2	(Laos) Young Elephants
Tina 13'; Pisoth 54', 62'; Sadat 65'	Report	Bounkong 45+1'; Souvanny 67'

Thống Nhất Stadium, Ho Chi Minh City
Attendance: 267
Referee: Halim Shirzad (Afghanistan)

=== Group J ===
Pos	Team	Pld	W	D	L	GF	GA	GD	Pts	Qualification	EAS	LEE	TNC	CPK
1	(Hong Kong) Eastern	2	2	0	0	6	2	+4	6	Inter-zone play-off semi-finals	—	—	3–1	Canc.
2	(Hong Kong) Lee Man	2	1	0	1	4	4	0	3		1–3	—	—	Canc.
3	(Chinese Taipei) Tainan City	2	0	0	2	2	6	−4	0		—	1–3	—	—
4	(Macau) MUST CPK	0	0	0	0	0	0	0	0	Withdrew	—	—	Canc.	—

Source: AFC
Rules for classification: Tiebreakers
24 June 2022
17:00 UTC+7

Lee Man (Hong Kong)	1–3	(Hong Kong) Eastern
Gil 10'	Report	Ma Hei Wai 16'; Bertomeu 45+3', 61'

Buriram Stadium, Buriram
Attendance: 159
Referee: Ismaeel Habib Ali (Bahrain)
24 June 2022

MUST CPK (Macau)	Cancelled	(Chinese Taipei) Tainan City

Buriram Stadium, Buriram

27 June 2022
17:00 UTC+7

Tainan City (Chinese Taipei)	1–3	(Hong Kong) Lee Man
Fenelus 72' (pen.)	Report	Yung Hui To 55'; Dutra 69'; Chang Hei Yin 78'

Buriram Stadium, Buriram
Attendance: 122
Referee: Adam Fazeel (Maldives)
27 June 2022

Eastern (Hong Kong)	Cancelled	(Macau) MUST CPK

Buriram Stadium, Buriram

30 June 2022
17:00 UTC+7

Eastern (Hong Kong)	3–1	(Chinese Taipei) Tainan City
Mikael 13'; Sun Ming Him 50'; Bertomeu 73'	Report	Kouamé 59'

Buriram Stadium, Buriram
Attendance: 130
Referee: Yousif Saeed Hassan (Iraq)
30 June 2022

Lee Man (Hong Kong)	Cancelled	(Macau) MUST CPK

Buriram Stadium, Buriram

== Ranking of runner-up teams ==
=== West Asia Zone ===
Pos	Grp	Team	Pld	W	D	L	GF	GA	GD	Pts	Qualification
1	B	(Bahrain) Al-Riffa	3	2	0	1	8	6	+2	6	Zonal semi-finals
2	A	Al-Kuwait	3	1	2	0	3	2	+1	5	
3	C	(Syria) Tishreen	3	1	1	1	3	3	0	4	

Source: AFC
Rules for classification: 1) Points; 2) Goal difference; 3) Goals scored; 4) Disciplinary points; 5) Drawing of lots.

=== ASEAN Zone ===
Since Group H only had three teams, the results against fourth-placed teams in Groups G and I were omitted for this ranking.

Pos	Grp	Team	Pld	W	D	L	GF	GA	GD	Pts	Qualification
1	H	(Malaysia) Kuala Lumpur City	2	1	1	0	2	1	+1	4	Zonal semi-finals
2	G	(Cambodia) Visakha FC	2	1	0	1	6	7	−1	3	
3	I	(Singapore) Hougang United	2	1	0	1	6	8	−2	3	

Source: AFC
Rules for classification: 1) Points; 2) Goal difference; 3) Goals scored; 4) Disciplinary points; 5) Drawing of lots.
