= 2022 AFC Cup =

19th secondary club football tournament organized by the AFC

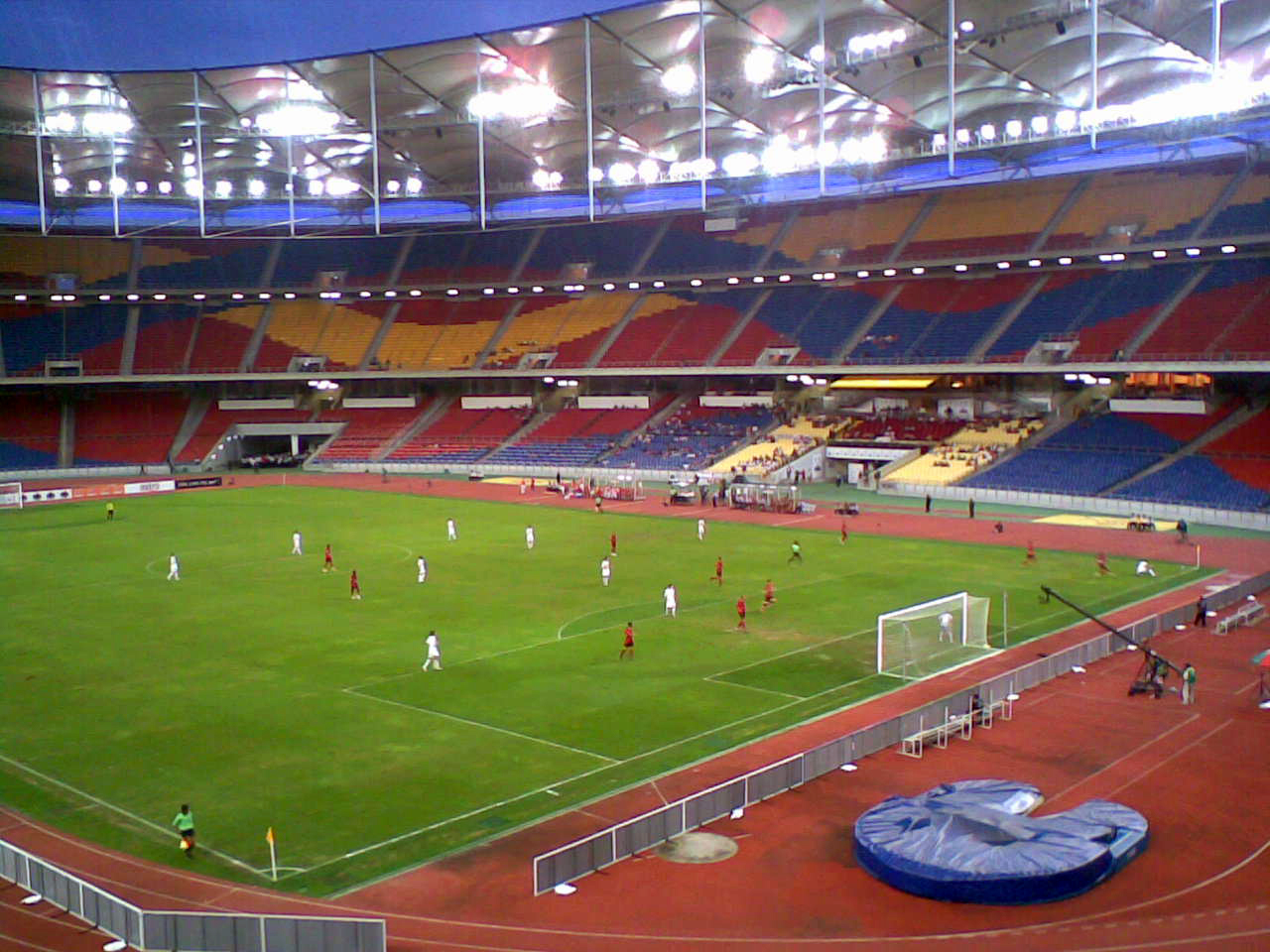
- The Bukit Jalil National Stadium in Kuala Lumpur hosted the final

Tournament details
- Dates: Qualifying: 5–19 April; Competition proper: 18 May – 22 October
- Teams: Competition proper: 38 (originally); Total: 44 (from 27 associations)

Final positions
- Champions: (Oman) Al-Seeb (1st title)
- Runners-up: (Malaysia) Kuala Lumpur City

Tournament statistics
- Matches played: 62
- Goals scored: 204 (3.29 per match)
- Attendance: 268,576 (4,332 per match)
- Top scorer(s): (Brazil) Paulo Josué (Brazil) Pedro Paulo (Uzbekistan) Jasur Hasanov (5 goals each)
- Best player: (Oman) Eid Al-Farsi
- (Note: All statistics do not include qualifying play-offs)

The 2022 AFC Cup was the 19th edition of the AFC Cup, Asia's secondary club football tournament organized by the Asian Football Confederation (AFC).

This season was the last in an all-year-round (spring-to-autumn) schedule; from 2023 the competition was switched to an autumn-to-spring schedule.

Bahraini club Al-Muharraq were the title holders, having won their second AFC Cup title in 2021. As they failed to obtain the AFC license, they did not defend their title. Al-Seeb of Oman won its first continental title. They automatically qualified for the 2023–24 AFC Champions League and entered the qualifying play-offs, since Omani teams were unable to qualify through domestic performance.

== Association team allocation ==
The 47 AFC member associations were ranked based on their clubs' performance over the last four years in AFC competitions (their national team's FIFA World Rankings no longer considered). The slots were allocated according to the following criteria according to the Entry Manual:

- The associations were split into five zones (Article 5.1):
  - West Asia Zone consisted of the 12 associations from the West Asian Football Federation (WAFF).
  - South Asia Zone consisted of the 7 associations from the South Asian Football Federation (SAFF).
  - Central Asia Zone consisted of the 6 associations from Central Asian Football Association (CAFA).
  - ASEAN Zone consisted of the 12 associations from the ASEAN Football Federation (AFF).
  - East Asia Zone consisted of the 10 associations from the East Asian Football Federation (EAFF).
  - The AFC may reallocate one or more associations to another zone if necessary for sporting reasons.
- Excluding the top five associations in each region for AFC Champions League slot allocation, all other associations were eligible to enter the AFC Cup.
- The teams from associations ranked 6th, 11th and 12th which were eliminated in the AFC Champions League qualifying play-offs, entered the AFC Cup group stage (Article 3.2). The following rules were applied:
  - The associations ranked 6th in both the West Region and the East Region, while allocated one direct slot in the AFC Cup group stage without taking away any direct slot from other associations, were not ranked in each zone for AFC Cup slot allocation (Article 5.3).
  - If they advanced to the AFC Champions League group stage, the AFC Cup group stage slot would be filled by the standby team from their association if such team would be available (Article 5.12).
  - The rules above dud not apply to the AFC Champions League title holders and AFC Cup title holders, which were allocated AFC Champions League play-off slots if they did not qualify for the tournament through domestic performance.
- In the West Asia Zone and the ASEAN Zone, there are three groups in the group stage, including 9 direct slots, with the 3 remaining slots filled through qualifying play-offs (Article 5.2). The slots in each zone are distributed as follows:
  - The associations ranked 1st to 3rd were each allocated two direct slots.
  - The associations ranked 4th to 6th were each allocated one direct slot and one play-off slot.
  - The associations ranked 7th or below were each allocated one play-off slot.
  - If any zone had an association ranked 6th for AFC Champions League slot allocation, they were allocated one direct slot in the AFC Cup group stage. There were 10 direct slots, with the 2 remaining slots filled through qualifying play-offs.
- In the South Asia Zone, the Central Asia Zone, and the East Asia Zone, there was a single group in the group stage, including 3 direct slots, with the 1 remaining slot filled through qualifying play-offs (Article 5.2). The slots in each zone were distributed as follows:
  - The associations ranked 1st to 3rd were each allocated one direct slot and one play-off slot.
  - The associations ranked 4th or below were each allocated one play-off slot.
  - If any zone has an association ranked 6th for AFC Champions League slot allocation, they were allocated one direct slot in the AFC Cup group stage. There were 4 direct slots, and to ensure equal opportunity in each zone, another group was added to this zone in the group stage, with the 4 remaining slots filled through qualifying play-offs (Article 5.4.1).
  - If any zone had at least 7 play-off slots, to ensure equal opportunity in each zone, another group was added to this zone in the group stage, with the 5 remaining slots filled through qualifying play-offs (Article 5.4.2).
- If any association with direct slots did not fulfill any one of the AFC Cup criteria, they had all their direct slots converted into play-off slots. The direct slots would be redistributed to the highest eligible association by the following criteria (Articles 5.7 and 5.8):
  - For each association, the maximum number of total slots would be two (Articles 3.4 and 3.5).
  - If any association was allocated one additional direct slot, one play-off slot was annulled and not redistributed.
- If any association with only play-off slot(s), including those mentioned above, did not fulfill the minimum AFC Cup criteria, the play-off slot(s) would be annulled and not redistributed (Articles 5.10 and 5.11).
- For each association, the maximum number of total slots was one-third of the total number of eligible teams (excluding foreign teams) in the top division (Article 5.6). Based on this rule, any direct slots given up would be redistributed by the same criteria as mentioned above, and play-off slots annulled and not redistributed (Article 9.10).
- All participating teams had to be granted an AFC Champions League or AFC Cup license, and (apart from cup winners) finish in the top half of their top division (Articles 7.1 and 9.5). If any association did not have enough teams which satisfied these criteria, any direct slots given up would be redistributed by the same criteria as mentioned above, and play-off slots annulled and not redistributed (Article 9.9).
- If any team granted a license refused to participate, their slot, either direct or play-off, is annulled and not redistributed (Article 9.11).

=== Association ranking ===
For the 2022 AFC Cup, the associations were allocated slots according to their AFC Club Competitions Ranking which was published on 29 November 2019, which takes into account their performance in the AFC Champions League and the AFC Cup during the period between 2016 and 2019.

Participation for 2022 AFC Cup
	Participating
	Not participating
~~(N)~~	Number of teams/associations originally entered, before withdrawal of teams from the competition after the draw

West Asia Zone (3 groups)
Rank		Member Association	Points	Slots			
Rank		Member Association	Points	Group stage	Play-off		
Zone	AFC	Member Association	Points	Group stage	Play-off round	Prelim. round 2	Prelim. round 1
1	12	Jordan	33.852	0	0	0	0
2	21	Lebanon	24.746	2	0	0	0
3	22	Syria	22.505	2	0	0	0
4	24	Bahrain	17.749	2	0	0	0
5	29	Oman	8.531	2	0	0	0
6	30	Palestine	7.297	2	0	0	0
7	34	Kuwait	4.711	2	0	0	0
8	42	Yemen	0.000	0	0	0	0
Total		Participating associations: 6		12	0	0	0
Total		Participating associations: 6		12	0		
Total		Participating associations: 6		12			

Central Asia Zone (2 groups)
Rank		Member Association	Points	Slots			
Rank		Member Association	Points	Group stage	Play-off		
Zone	AFC	Member Association	Points	Group stage	Play-off round	Prelim. round 2	Prelim. round 1
1	10	Uzbekistan	45.562	1	0	0	0
2	17	Tajikistan	28.361	2	0	0	0
3	20	Turkmenistan	26.532	2	0	0	0
4	33	Kyrgyzstan	5.466	2	0	0	0
5	41	Afghanistan	0.206	0	0	0	0
Total		Participating associations: 4		7	0	0	0
Total		Participating associations: 4		7	0		
Total		Participating associations: 4		7			

South Asia Zone (1 group)
Rank		Member Association	Points	Slots			
Rank		Member Association	Points	Group stage	Play-off		
Zone	AFC	Member Association	Points	Group stage	Play-off round	Prelim. round 2	Prelim. round 1
1	15	India	23.888	1	0	1	0
2	25	Bangladesh	16.690	1	1 ~~(0)~~	0 ~~(1)~~	0
3	26	Maldives	14.798	1	0	0	1
4	36	Nepal	1.148	0	0	0	1
5	37	Sri Lanka	0.774	0	0	0	1
6	38	Bhutan	0.688	0	0	0	1
7	42	Pakistan	0.000	0	0	0	0
Total		Participating associations: 6		3	1	1	4
Total		Participating associations: 6		3	6		
Total		Participating associations: 6		9			

ASEAN Zone (3 groups)
Rank		Member Association	Points	Slots			
Rank		Member Association	Points	Group stage	Play-off		
Zone	AFC	Member Association	Points	Group stage	Play-off round	Prelim. round 2	Prelim. round 1
1	13	Philippines	32.130	1	0	0	0
2	16	Vietnam	28.571	1	0	0	0
3	18	Malaysia	26.960	2	0	0	0
4	19	Singapore	26.607	2	0	0	0
5	27	Myanmar	12.756	0 ~~(2)~~	0	0	0
6	28	Indonesia	12.550	2	0	0	0
7	31	Cambodia	6.770	2 ~~(1)~~	0 ~~(1)~~	0	0
8	35	Laos	2.241	1 ~~(0)~~	0 ~~(1)~~	0	0
9	42	Brunei	0.000	0	0	0	0
10	42	Timor-Leste	0.000	0	0	0	0
Total		Participating associations: 7 ~~(8)~~		11	0 ~~(2)~~	0	0
Total		Participating associations: 7 ~~(8)~~		11	0 ~~(2)~~		
Total		Participating associations: 7 ~~(8)~~		11 ~~(13)~~			

East Asia Zone (1 group)
Rank		Member Association	Points	Slots			
Rank		Member Association	Points	Group stage	Play-off		
Zone	AFC	Member Association	Points	Group stage	Play-off round	Prelim. round 2	Prelim. round 1
1	14	North Korea	30.100	0	0	0	0
2	23	Hong Kong	19.945	1	1	0	0
3	32	Macau	5.489	0~~(1)~~	0	0	0
4	39	Chinese Taipei	0.457	1	0	0	0
5	40	Mongolia	0.274	0	1	0	0
6	42	Guam	0.000	0	0	0	0
7	42	Northern Mariana Islands	0.000	0	0	0	0
Total		Participating associations: 4		2~~(3)~~	2	0	0
Total		Participating associations: 4		2~~(3)~~	2		
Total		Participating associations: 4		4~~(5)~~			

Notes

1. AFC Licensing (AFC1): Association did not implement the club licensing system.
2. AFC Licensing (AFC2): Association did not have a licensed club.
3. Bangladesh (BAN): Maldives' representative Valencia withdrew from the competition after the preliminary round 1. As a result, Bangladesh's representative Abahani Limited Dhaka directly advanced to the play-off round.
4. Jordan (JOR): Jordan's only team granted a license are playing in the 2022 AFC Champions League.
5. Kuwait (KUW): Kuwait is given an additional slot due to unallocated slots in West Zone (Entry Manual Article 5.2).
6. Macau (MAC): Macau's indirect slot is annulled as Benfica Macau, the Liga de Elite runners-up, refuses to enter the AFC Cup (Entry Manual Article 9.11).
7. Myanmar (MYA): The teams from Myanmar which originally entered the AFC Cup, Shan United and Hantharwady United, withdrew from the competition after the draw.
8. Philippines (PHI): Philippines are ranked 6th in the East Region for AFC Champions League allocation, and thus are allocated one direct slot in the AFC Cup group stage without taking away any direct slot from other associations.
9. Uzbekistan (UZB): Uzbekistan are ranked 6th in the West Region for AFC Champions League allocation, and thus are allocated one direct slot in the AFC Cup group stage without taking away any direct slot from other associations.
10. Vietnam (VIE): Vietnam had only one entry as Nam Dinh, the 2021 V.League 1 fourth place, refuses to enter the AFC Cup (Entry Manual Article 9.11).

== Teams ==
Location of teams of the 2022 AFC Cup.
Brown: Group A; Red: Group B; Orange: Group C; Yellow: Group D; Pink: Group E;
Green: Group F; Blue: Group G; Cyan: Group H; Turquoise: Group I; Purple: Group J;
(H) Group stage hosts
Qualifying play-offs
~~Withdrawn teams~~

Locations of the 2022 AFC Cup teams in the West side of Central East

Locations of the 2022 AFC Cup teams in the Central Asia

West Asia ZoneGroup stage direct entrants (Groups A–C)
Team	Qualifying method	App. (last)
(Lebanon) Al-Ansar	2020–21 Lebanese Premier League champions and 2020–21 Lebanese FA Cup winners	8th (2021)
(Lebanon) Nejmeh	2020–21 Lebanese Premier League runners-up	10th (2019)
(Syria) Tishreen	2020–21 Syrian Premier League champions	2nd (2021)
(Syria) Jableh	2020–21 Syrian Cup winners	1st
(Bahrain) Al-Riffa	2020–21 Bahraini Premier League champions and 2020–21 Bahraini King's Cup winners	6th (2020)
(Bahrain) East Riffa	2020–21 Bahraini Premier League runners-up	1st
(Oman) Al-Seeb	2019–20 Oman Professional League champions	1st
(Oman) Dhofar	2020–21 Sultan Qaboos Cup winners	6th (2020)
(Palestine) Shabab Al-Khalil	2020–21 West Bank Premier League champions	2nd (2017)
(Palestine) Hilal Al-Quds	2020–21 West Bank Premier League third place	5th (2020)
(Kuwait) Al-Arabi	2020–21 Kuwaiti Premier League champions	2nd (2009)
Al-Kuwait	2020–21 Kuwait Emir Cup winners	11th (2021)

South Asia ZoneGroup stage direct entrants (Group D)
Team	Qualifying method	App. (last)
(India) Gokulam Kerala	2020–21 I-League champions	1st
(Bangladesh) Bashundhara Kings	2021 Bangladesh Premier League champions and 2020–21 Bangladesh Federation Cup winners	3rd (2021)
(Maldives) Maziya	2020–21 Dhivehi Premier League champions	8th (2021)

Qualifying play-off participants: Entering in play-off round
Team	Qualifying method	App (Last)
(Bangladesh) Dhaka Abahani	2021 Bangladesh Premier League third place	5th (2020)

Qualifying play-off participants: Entering in preliminary round 2
Team	Qualifying method	App. (last)
(India) ATK Mohun Bagan	2020–21 Indian Super League regular season runners-up	6th (2021)

Qualifying play-off participants: Entering in preliminary round 1
Team	Qualifying method	App. (last)
(Maldives) Valencia	2020–21 Dhivehi Premier League runners-up	5th (2017)
(Nepal) Machhindra	2021 Martyr's Memorial A-Division League Matchday 7 leaders	1st
(Sri Lanka) Blue Star	2021 Sri Lanka Super League champions	1st
(Bhutan) Paro	2021 Bhutan Premier League champions	2nd (2020)

Central Asia ZoneGroup stage direct entrants (Groups E–F)
Team	Qualifying method	App. (last)
(Uzbekistan) Sogdiana Jizzakh	2021 Uzbekistan Super League runners-up	1st
(Tajikistan) Khujand	2021 Tajikistan Cup winners	6th (2021)
(Tajikistan) CSKA Pamir Dushanbe	2021 Tajikistan Higher League third place	1st
(Turkmenistan) Altyn Asyr	2021 Ýokary Liga champions	8th (2021)
(Turkmenistan) Köpetdag Aşgabat	2021 Ýokary Liga fourth place	1st
(Kyrgyzstan) Dordoi Bishkek	2021 Kyrgyz Premier League champions	7th (2021)
(Kyrgyzstan) Neftchi Kochkor-Ata	2021 Kyrgyzstan Cup winners	2nd (2020)

ASEAN ZoneGroup stage direct entrants (Groups G–I)
Team	Qualifying method	App. (last)
(Philippines) Kaya F.C.–Iloilo	2021 Copa Paulino Alcantara winners	4th (2020)
(Vietnam) Viettel	2021 V.League 1 second place	1st
(Malaysia) Kuala Lumpur City	2021 Malaysia Cup winners	1st
(Malaysia) Kedah Darul Aman	2021 Malaysia Super League runners-up	4th (2021)
(Singapore) Hougang United	2021 Singapore Premier League third place	2nd (2020)
(Singapore) Tampines Rovers	2021 Singapore Premier League fourth place	13th (2020)
(Indonesia) Bali United	2019 Liga 1 champions	4th (2021)
(Indonesia) PSM Makassar	2018–19 Piala Indonesia winners	3rd (2020)
(Cambodia) Phnom Penh Crown	2021 C-League champions	2nd (2017)
(Cambodia) Visakha FC	2021 Hun Sen Cup winners	2nd (2021)
(Laos) Young Elephants	2020 Lao Premier League third place	1st

Withdrawn teams
Team	Qualifying method	App. (last)
(Myanmar) Shan United	2020 Myanmar National League champions	4th (2020)
(Myanmar) Hantharwady United	2020 Myanmar National League runners-up	1st

East Asia ZoneGroup stage direct entrants (Group J)
Team	Qualifying method	App. (last)
(Hong Kong) Eastern	2020–21 Hong Kong Premier League runners-up	3rd (2021)
(Chinese Taipei) Tainan City	2021 Taiwan Premier League champions	2nd (2021)

Qualifying play-off participants
Team	Qualifying method	App. (last)
(Hong Kong) Lee Man	2020–21 Hong Kong Premier League third place	2nd (2021)
(Mongolia) Athletic 220	2021 Mongolian Premier League champions	2nd (2021)

Withdrawn teams
Team	Qualifying method	App. (last)
(Macau) MUST CPK	2021 Liga de Elite champions and 2021 Taça de Macau winners	2nd (2020)

Notes

1. AFC Champions League (ACL): Standby team replacing another team qualified for the 2022 AFC Champions League group stage.
2. Bangladesh (BAN): The second-placed team Sheikh Jamal were ineligible as they failed to obtain an AFC license.
3. Hong Kong (HKG): Due to the COVID-19 pandemic in Hong Kong, the 2020–21 Hong Kong FA Cup was cancelled and declared null and void by the Hong Kong Football Association. The teams from Hong Kong playing in the 2022 AFC Cup are determined only by the results of the 2020–21 Hong Kong Premier League.
4. Indonesia (IDN): The 2019 Liga 1 champions, Bali United and 2018–19 Piala Indonesia winners, PSM Makassar were chosen to represent Indonesia in the 2022 AFC Cup because the 2020 Liga 1 and the 2020 Piala Indonesia were cancelled and declared void by the Football Association of Indonesia and 2021–22 Liga 1 is still running and not be finished until April 2022.
5. India (IND): Since Mumbai City, the 2020–21 Indian Super League regular season premiers, are also the 2021 Indian Super League playoffs winners, ATK Mohun Bagan, the 2020–21 Indian Super League regular season runners-up, qualify for the 2022 AFC Cup.
6. Macau (MAC): Due to the COVID-19 pandemic travel restrictions, Must CPK withdrew from the competition after the draw.
7. Malaysia (MAS): Due to the COVID-19 pandemic in Malaysia, the 2021 Malaysia FA Cup was cancelled and not organized by the Football Association of Malaysia. The 2021 Malaysia Cup winners will qualify for the 2022 AFC Cup.
8. Maldives (MDV): Due to the COVID-19 pandemic in Maldives, the 2021 Maldives FA Cup was cancelled and not organized by the Football Association of Maldives. The teams from Maldives playing in the 2022 AFC Cup are determined only by the results of the 2020–21 Dhivehi Premier League.
9. Myanmar (MYA): Due to the COVID-19 pandemic in Myanmar plus the 2021 Myanmar coup d'état and protests, the 2021 Myanmar National League was not held by the Myanmar Football Federation.
10. Nepal (NEP): Since the 2021–22 Martyr's Memorial A-Division League could not be completed in time, it was agreed that the table toppers after matchday 7 would qualify for the AFC Cup.
11. Oman (OMA): Due to the COVID-19 pandemic in Oman, the 2020–21 Oman Professional League was cancelled and declared null and void by the Oman Football Association. One of the two teams from Oman playing in the 2022 AFC Cup was determined by the results of the previous domestic season (2019–20 Oman Professional League).
12. Palestine (PLE): Due to the COVID-19 pandemic in the State of Palestine, the 2020–21 Palestine Cup was cancelled and not organized by the Palestinian Football Association. The teams from Palestine playing in the 2022 AFC Cup are determined only by the results of the 2020–21 West Bank Premier League. The second-placed team Markaz Balata were ineligible as they failed to obtain an AFC license.
13. Philippines (PHI): Due to the COVID-19 pandemic in the Philippines, the 2021 Philippines Football League was cancelled, with the 2021 Copa Paulino Alcantara used to determine the Philippine club to participate. The Azkals Development Team were the runners-up in the competition, however the club did not own an AFC club license and was thus ineligible to compete in AFC club competitions. Kaya F.C.–Iloilo first played in the 2022 AFC Champions League qualifying play-offs and were eliminated, but still qualified to the AFC Cup group stage.
14. Singapore (SIN): Due to the COVID-19 pandemic in Singapore, the 2021 Singapore Cup was cancelled and not organized by the Football Association of Singapore. The teams from Singapore playing in the 2022 AFC Cup are determined only by the results of the 2021 Singapore Premier League.
15. Turkmenistan (TKM1): Only Ahal (the Ýokary Liga runners-up) were granted an AFC Champions League license; so Altyn Asyr qualified for 2022 AFC Cup instead.
16. Turkmenistan (TKM2):2021 Turkmenistan Cup winners and 2021 Ýokary Liga 3rd place Şagadam were not granted an AFC Cup license. As a result, Köpetdag, the second best team granted an AFC Cup license and not an AFC Champions League license (2021 Ýokary Liga fourth place), qualified for the 2022 AFC Cup.
17. Vietnam (VIE): Due to the COVID-19 pandemic in Vietnam, the 2021 V.League 1 and 2021 Vietnamese Cup were both abandoned by the Vietnam Football Federation. It was decided that the league's first placed team at the time of abandonment would take the AFC Champions League slot, with the AFC Cup slots to go to the second and third placed teams. Subsequently, third-placed team Than Quang Ninh were omitted from V-League competitions, after loss of their main sponsor and other financial difficulties. Nam Dinh, who were fourth at the time of the suspension, should be given the AFC Cup slot but declined.

== Schedule ==
The tournament ran from April to October 2022, so as not to clash with the World Cup.

The final schedule of the competition was as follows:

Stage	Round	Draw dates	Match dates
Preliminary stage	Preliminary round 1	17 January 2022	5 April 2022 (S)
Preliminary stage	Preliminary round 2	17 January 2022	12 April 2022 (S)
Play-off stage	Play-off round	17 January 2022	19 April 2022 (S, E)
Group stage	Matchday 1	17 January 2022	18 May 2022 (W, S), 24 June 2022 (C, A, E)
Group stage	Matchday 2	17 January 2022	21 May 2022 (W, S), 27 June 2022 (C, A, E)
Group stage	Matchday 3	17 January 2022	24 May 2022 (W, S), 30 June 2022 (C, A, E)
Knockout stage	Zonal semi-finals	17 January 2022	9–10 August 2022 (A), 5–6 September 2022 (W)
Knockout stage	Zonal finals	14 July 2022	17 August 2022 (C); 24 August 2022 (A), 4 October 2022 (W)
Knockout stage	Inter-zone play-off semi-finals	14 July 2022	6–7 September 2022
Knockout stage	Inter-zone play-off final	14 July 2022	5 October 2022
Knockout stage	Final	14 July 2022	22 October 2022 at Bukit Jalil National Stadium, Kuala Lumpur

Notes

- W: West Asia Zone
- S: South Asia Zone
- C: Central Asia Zone
- A: ASEAN Zone
- E: East Asia Zone

== Qualifying play-offs ==
In the qualifying play-offs, each tie was played as a single match. Extra time and penalty shoot-out were used to decide the winner if necessary. The bracket of the qualifying play-offs for each zone was determined based on each team's association ranking, with the team from the higher-ranked association hosting the match. The three winners of the play-off round advanced to the group stage to join the 36 direct entrants.

=== Preliminary round 1 ===
South Asia Zone
Team 1	Score	Team 2
Machhindra (Nepal)	1–2	(Sri Lanka) Blue Star
Valencia (Maldives)	2–1 (a.e.t.)	(Bhutan) Paro

=== Preliminary round 2 ===
South Asia Zone
Team 1	Score	Team 2
ATK Mohun Bagan (India)	5–0	(Sri Lanka) Blue Star
Abahani Limited Dhaka (Bangladesh)	Cancelled (Note: On 11 April 2022, the AFC announced that Valencia withdrew from the preliminary stage of the qualification, citing financial constraints. Abahani Limited Dhaka advanced to the play-off round.)	(Maldives) Valencia

=== Play-off round ===
South Asia Zone
Team 1	Score	Team 2
ATK Mohun Bagan (India)	3–1	(Bangladesh) Abahani Limited Dhaka

ASEAN Zone
Team 1	Score	Team 2
Visakha FC (Cambodia)	Cancelled (Note: On 19 January 2022, the AFC announced that the two teams from Myanmar, Shan United and Hanthawaddy United, withdrew from the group stage after the draw. As a result, on 1 March 2022, the AFC decided to cancel the ASEAN zone play-off round match between Visakha FC and Young Elephants, and promote both the participating teams to the group stage to fill the vacant group stage spots.)	(Laos) Young Elephants

East Zone
Team 1	Score	Team 2
Lee Man (Hong Kong)	2–1	(Mongolia) Athletic 220

== Group stage ==
The draw for the group stage was held on 17 January 2022 at AFC House in Kuala Lumpur, Malaysia. The 39 teams were drawn into nine groups of four and one group of three (in the Central Asia Zone): three groups each in the West Asia Zone (Groups A–C) and the ASEAN Zone (Groups G–I), two groups in the Central Asia Zone (Groups E–F), and one group each in the South Asia Zone (Group D) and the East Asia Zone (Group J). For each zone, teams were seeded into four pots and drawn into the relevant positions within each group, based on their association ranking and their seeding within their association, in consideration of technical balance between groups. Teams from the same association in zones with more than one group (West Asia Zone, Central Asia Zone, and ASEAN Zone) could not be drawn into the same group. In the group stage, each group is played on a single round-robin basis in centralised venues. The following teams will advance to the knockout stage:

- The winners of each group and the best runners-up in the West Asia Zone and the ASEAN Zone advance to the Zonal semi-finals.
- The winners of each group in the Central Asia Zone advance to the Zonal finals.
- The winners of each group in the South Asia Zone and the East Asia Zone advance to the Inter-zone play-off semi-finals.

Tiebreakers

The teams are ranked according to points (3 points for a win, 1 point for a draw, 0 points for a loss). If tied on points, tiebreakers were applied in the following order (Regulations Article 8.3):

1. Points in head-to-head matches among tied teams;
2. Goal difference in head-to-head matches among tied teams;
3. Goals scored in head-to-head matches among tied teams;
4. ~~Away goals scored in head-to-head matches among tied teams~~ (Not applicable since matches will be played in centralised venues);
5. If more than two teams are tied, and after applying all head-to-head criteria above, a subset of teams are still tied, all head-to-head criteria above are reapplied exclusively to this subset of teams;
6. Goal difference in all group matches;
7. Goals scored in all group matches;
8. Penalty shoot-out if only two teams playing each other in the last round of the group are tied;
9. Disciplinary points (yellow card = 1 point, red card as a result of two yellow cards = 3 points, direct red card = 3 points, yellow card followed by direct red card = 4 points);
10. Association ranking;
11. Drawing of lots.

=== Group A ===
Pos	Team	Pld	W	D	L	GF	GA	GD	Pts	Qualification	SEB	KSC	JAB	ANS
1	(Oman) Al-Seeb (H)	3	2	0	1	6	2	+4	6	Zonal semi-finals	—	—	1–0	—
2	Al-Kuwait	3	1	2	0	3	2	+1	5		2–1	—	—	—
3	(Syria) Jableh	3	1	1	1	1	1	0	4		—	0–0	—	1–0
4	(Lebanon) Al-Ansar	3	0	1	2	1	6	−5	1		0–4	1–1	—	—

Source: AFC
(H) Hosts

=== Group B ===
Pos	Team	Pld	W	D	L	GF	GA	GD	Pts	Qualification	ARA	RIF	DHO	SAK
1	(Kuwait) Al-Arabi (H)	3	2	1	0	5	3	+2	7	Zonal semi-finals	—	—	—	1–0
2	(Bahrain) Al-Riffa	3	2	0	1	8	6	+2	6	Zonal semi-finals	2–3	—	—	3–1
3	(Oman) Dhofar	3	1	1	1	6	4	+2	4		1–1	2–3	—	—
4	(Palestine) Shabab Al-Khalil	3	0	0	3	1	7	−6	0		—	—	0–3	—

Source: AFC
(H) Hosts

=== Group C ===
Pos	Team	Pld	W	D	L	GF	GA	GD	Pts	Qualification	EAR	TIS	NEJ	HAQ
1	(Bahrain) East Riffa (H)	3	1	2	0	5	3	+2	5	Zonal semi-finals	—	2–0	—	2–2
2	(Syria) Tishreen	3	1	1	1	3	3	0	4 (Note: Head-to-head points: Tishreen 3, Nejmeh 0.)		—	—	3–1	0–0
3	(Lebanon) Nejmeh	3	1	1	1	4	4	0	4		1–1	—	—	—
4	(Palestine) Hilal Al-Quds	3	0	2	1	2	4	−2	2		—	—	0–2	—

Source: AFC
(H) Hosts

=== Group D ===
Pos	Team	Pld	W	D	L	GF	GA	GD	Pts	Qualification	MBSG	BSK	MAZ	GOK
1	(India) ATK Mohun Bagan (H)	3	2	0	1	11	6	+5	6 (Note: Head-to-head points: ATK Mohun Bagan 3, Bashundhara Kings 0.)	Inter-zone play-off semi-finals	—	4–0	—	—
2	(Bangladesh) Bashundhara Kings	3	2	0	1	3	5	−2	6		—	—	1–0	—
3	(Maldives) Maziya	3	1	0	2	3	6	−3	3 (Note: Head-to-head points: Maziya 3, Gokulam Kerala 0.)		2–5	—	—	1–0
4	(India) Gokulam Kerala	3	1	0	2	5	5	0	3		4–2	1–2	—	—

Source: AFC
(H) Hosts

=== Group E ===
Pos	Team	Pld	W	D	L	GF	GA	GD	Pts	Qualification	SOG	ALT	CPD	NEF
1	(Uzbekistan) Sogdiana Jizzakh	3	3	0	0	8	3	+5	9	Zonal finals	—	3–1	—	2–0
2	(Turkmenistan) Altyn Asyr	3	1	1	1	3	4	−1	4		—	—	1–1	—
3	(Tajikistan) CSKA Pamir Dushanbe (H)	3	0	2	1	3	4	−1	2		2–3	—	—	0–0
4	(Kyrgyzstan) Neftchi	3	0	1	2	0	3	−3	1		—	0–1	—	—

Source: AFC
(H) Hosts

=== Group F ===
Pos	Team	Pld	W	D	L	GF	GA	GD	Pts	Qualification	KHU	KPD	DOR
1	(Tajikistan) Khujand	2	1	1	0	3	1	+2	4	Zonal finals	—	—	0–0
2	(Turkmenistan) Köpetdag	2	1	0	1	2	3	−1	3		1–3	—	—
3	(Kyrgyzstan) Dordoi (H)	2	0	1	1	0	1	−1	1		—	0–1	—

Source: AFC
(H) Hosts

=== Group G ===
Pos	Team	Pld	W	D	L	GF	GA	GD	Pts	Qualification	KED	VIS	BAL	KAY
1	(Malaysia) Kedah Darul Aman	3	2	0	1	9	4	+5	6 (Note: Head-to-head standings: Tied on head-to-head points.; Head-to-head goal difference: Kedah Darul Aman: +2, Visakha FC –1, Bali United –1.; Head-to-head goals scored: Visakha FC 6, Bali United 4.)	Zonal semi-finals	—	5–1	—	4–1
2	(Cambodia) Visakha FC	3	2	0	1	8	8	0	6		—	—	5–2	—
3	(Indonesia) Bali United (H)	3	2	0	1	5	5	0	6		2–0	—	—	—
4	(Philippines) Kaya F.C.–Iloilo	3	0	0	3	2	7	−5	0		—	1–2	0–1	—

Source: AFC
(H) Hosts

=== Group H ===
Pos	Team	Pld	W	D	L	GF	GA	GD	Pts	Qualification	PSM	KLC	TAM
1	(Indonesia) PSM Makassar	2	1	1	0	3	1	+2	4 (Note: Tied on head-to-head results. Overall goal difference used as tiebreaker.)	Zonal semi-finals	—	0–0	—
2	(Malaysia) Kuala Lumpur City (H)	2	1	1	0	2	1	+1	4	Zonal semi-finals	—	—	2–1
3	(Singapore) Tampines Rovers	2	0	0	2	2	5	−3	0		1–3	—	—

Source: AFC
(H) Hosts

=== Group I ===
Pos	Team	Pld	W	D	L	GF	GA	GD	Pts	Qualification	VIE	HOU	PPC	YEL
1	(Vietnam) Viettel (H)	3	3	0	0	11	3	+8	9	Zonal semi-finals	—	5–2	—	5–1
2	(Singapore) Hougang United	3	2	0	1	9	9	0	6		—	—	4–3	—
3	(Cambodia) Phnom Penh Crown	3	1	0	2	7	7	0	3		0–1	—	—	4–2
4	(Laos) Young Elephants	3	0	0	3	4	12	−8	0		—	1–3	—	—

Source: AFC
(H) Hosts

=== Group J ===
Pos	Team	Pld	W	D	L	GF	GA	GD	Pts	Qualification	EAS	LEE	TNC	CPK
1	(Hong Kong) Eastern	2	2	0	0	6	2	+4	6	Inter-zone play-off semi-finals	—	—	3–1	Canc.
2	(Hong Kong) Lee Man	2	1	0	1	4	4	0	3		1–3	—	—	Canc.
3	(Chinese Taipei) Tainan City	2	0	0	2	2	6	−4	0		—	1–3	—	—
4	(Macau) MUST CPK	0	0	0	0	0	0	0	0	Withdrew	—	—	Canc.	—

Source: AFC

=== Ranking of runner-up teams ===
==== West Asia Zone ====
Pos	Grp	Team	Pld	W	D	L	GF	GA	GD	Pts	Qualification
1	B	(Bahrain) Al-Riffa	3	2	0	1	8	6	+2	6	Zonal semi-finals
2	A	Al-Kuwait	3	1	2	0	3	2	+1	5	
3	C	(Syria) Tishreen	3	1	1	1	3	3	0	4	

Source: AFC
Rules for classification: 1) Points; 2) Goal difference; 3) Goals scored; 4) Disciplinary points; 5) Drawing of lots.

==== ASEAN Zone ====
Since Group H only had three teams, the results against fourth-placed teams in Groups G and I were omitted for this ranking.

Pos	Grp	Team	Pld	W	D	L	GF	GA	GD	Pts	Qualification
1	H	(Malaysia) Kuala Lumpur City	2	1	1	0	2	1	+1	4	Zonal semi-finals
2	G	(Cambodia) Visakha FC	2	1	0	1	6	7	−1	3	
3	I	(Singapore) Hougang United	2	1	0	1	6	8	−2	3	

Source: AFC
Rules for classification: 1) Points; 2) Goal difference; 3) Goals scored; 4) Disciplinary points; 5) Drawing of lots.

== Knockout stage ==
In the knockout stage, the 12 teams played a single-elimination tournament. The extra time and penalty shoot-out were used to decide the winners if necessary (Regulations Article 9.3 and 10.1).

=== Bracket ===
The draw for the Zonal finals and the Inter-zone play-off semi-finals was held on 14 July 2022.

The bracket of the knockout stage was determined as follows:

Zonal semi-finals
(Vietnam) Viettel	0 (5)
(Malaysia) Kuala Lumpur City (p)	0 (6)
(Indonesia) PSM Makassar	2
(Malaysia) Kedah Darul Aman	1
(Kuwait) Al-Arabi	1
(Oman) Al-Seeb (a.e.t.)	2
(Bahrain) East Riffa	1 (4)
(Bahrain) Al-Riffa (p)	1 (5)

Zonal finals
(Tajikistan) Khujand	0
(Uzbekistan) Sogdiana Jizzakh	4
(Malaysia) Kuala Lumpur City	5
(Indonesia) PSM Makassar	2
(Oman) Al-Seeb	4
(Bahrain) Al-Riffa	0

Inter-zone play-off semi-finals
(Uzbekistan) Sogdiana Jizzakh	1
(Hong Kong) Eastern	0
(India) ATK Mohun Bagan	1
(Malaysia) Kuala Lumpur City	3

Inter-zone play-off final
(Uzbekistan) Sogdiana Jizzakh	0 (3)
(Malaysia) Kuala Lumpur City (p)	0 (5)

Final
(Malaysia) Kuala Lumpur City	0
(Oman) Al-Seeb	3

=== Summary ===
The Zonal semi-finals were played over one leg, with the home team determined by the following tables based on which group runners-up qualified. The group winner hosts the match against a group runner-up. If two group winners played each other, one of the group winners hosted the match.

West Asia Zone
Team 1	Score	Team 2
Al-Arabi (Kuwait)	1–2 (a.e.t.)	(Oman) Al-Seeb
East Riffa (Bahrain)	1–1 (a.e.t.) (4–5 p)	(Bahrain) Al-Riffa

ASEAN Zone
Team 1	Score	Team 2
PSM Makassar (Indonesia)	2–1	(Malaysia) Kedah Darul Aman
Viettel (Vietnam)	0–0 (a.e.t.) (5–6 p)	(Malaysia) Kuala Lumpur City

=== West Asia Zone ===
5 September 2022
20:00 UTC+3

Al-Arabi (Kuwait)	1–2 (a.e.t.)	(Oman) Al-Seeb
Eduwo 112'	Report	Al-Ghassani 95'; Al-Yahyaei 99'

Al Kuwait Sports Club Stadium, Kuwait City
Attendance: 5,200
Referee: Sivakorn Pu-udom (Thailand)

6 September 2022
20:00 UTC+3

East Riffa (Bahrain)	1–1 (a.e.t.)	(Bahrain) Al-Riffa
Shallal 117'	Report	Haram 114'
Penalties
Bodahoom (penalty missed); Al-Shaikh (penalty scored); Shallal (penalty scored); Khelaif (penalty scored); Al-Husaini (penalty scored); Abdulnabi (penalty missed)	4–5	(penalty scored) Haram; (penalty scored) Al-Romaihi; (penalty scored) Marhoon; (penalty scored) Al-Malki; (penalty missed) Al-Aswad; (penalty scored) Derrardja

Al Muharraq Stadium, Arad
Attendance: 2,554
Referee: Kim Woo-sung (South Korea)

=== ASEAN Zone ===
9 August 2022
19:00 UTC+8

PSM Makassar (Indonesia)	2–1	(Malaysia) Kedah Darul Aman
Yakob 31'; Fernandes 54'	Report	Fayadh 86'

Kapten I Wayan Dipta Stadium, Gianyar
Attendance: 368
Referee: Akhrol Risquallev (Uzbekistan)
10 August 2022
18:00 UTC+7

Viettel (Vietnam)	0–0 (a.e.t.)	(Malaysia) Kuala Lumpur City
	Report
Penalties
Nguyễn Hoàng Đức (penalty scored); Hồ Khắc Ngọc (penalty scored); Nhâm Mạnh Dũng (penalty scored); Trần Danh Trung (penalty missed); Phan Tuấn Tài (penalty scored); Dương Văn Hào (penalty scored); Bùi Duy Thường (penalty missed)	5–6	(penalty scored) Josué; (penalty missed) Irfan; (penalty scored) Hadin; (penalty scored) Morales; (penalty scored) Gallifuoco; (penalty scored) Zhafri; (penalty scored) Akram

Thống Nhất Stadium, Ho Chi Minh City
Attendance: 3,016
Referee: Ahmed Al-Kaf (Oman)

=== Summary ===
The Zonal finals were played over one leg, with the home team decided by draw. The winners of the West Asia Zonal final advanced to the final, while the winners of the Central Asia Zonal final and ASEAN Zonal final advanced to the Inter-zone play-off semi-finals.

West Asia Zone
Team 1	Score	Team 2
Al-Seeb (Oman)	4–0	(Bahrain) Al-Riffa

Central Asia Zone
Team 1	Score	Team 2
Khujand (Tajikistan)	0–4	(Uzbekistan) Sogdiana Jizzakh

ASEAN Zone
Team 1	Score	Team 2
Kuala Lumpur City (Malaysia)	5–2	(Indonesia) PSM Makassar

=== West Asia Zone ===
4 October 2022
19:00 UTC+4

Al-Seeb (Oman)	4–0	(Bahrain) Al-Riffa
Al-Muqbali 47'; Al-Siyabi 62'; Al-Yahyaei 79'; Dauda 90+2'	Report

Al-Seeb Stadium, Seeb
Attendance: 11,680
Referee: Jumpei Iida (Japan)

=== Central Asia Zone ===
17 August 2022
15:30 UTC+5

Khujand (Tajikistan)	0–4	(Uzbekistan) Sogdiana Jizzakh
	Report	Hasanov 13', 21'; Norkhonov 29'; Kahramonov 78'

20 Years of Independence Stadium, Khujand
Attendance: 5,600
Referee: Kim Hee-gon (South Korea)

=== ASEAN Zone ===
24 August 2022
21:00 UTC+8

Kuala Lumpur City (Malaysia)	5–2	(Indonesia) PSM Makassar
Morales 33'; Mintah 45+2'; Josué 52' (pen.), 84'; Hadin 90+4' (pen.)	Report	Sayuri 58'; Tanjung 63'

Kuala Lumpur Stadium, Kuala Lumpur
Attendance: 2,905
Referee: Yusuke Araki (Japan)

=== Inter-zone play-off semi-finals ===
6 September 2022
18:00 UTC+5

Sogdiana Jizzakh (Uzbekistan)	1–0	(Hong Kong) Eastern
Norkhonov 85'	Report

Sogdiyona Sport Majmuasi, Jizzakh
Attendance: 7,150
Referee: Ahmed Al Alili (United Arab Emirates)

7 September 2022
19:00 UTC+5:30

ATK Mohun Bagan (India)	1–3	(Malaysia) Kuala Lumpur City
Fardin Ali Molla 90'	Report	Josué 60'; Fakrul 90+2'; Morales 90+5'

Vivekananda Yuba Bharati Krirangan, Kolkata
Attendance: 18,594
Referee: Khalid Al-Turais (Saudi Arabia)

=== Summary ===
In the Inter-zone play-off final, the two winners of the Inter-zone play-off semi-finals played each other, with the home team determined by the Inter-zone play-off semi-final draw. The winners of the Inter-zone play-off final advanced to the final.

Team 1	Score	Team 2
Sogdiana Jizzakh (Uzbekistan)	0–0 (a.e.t.) (3–5 p)	(Malaysia) Kuala Lumpur City

=== Match ===
5 October 2022
18:00 UTC+5

Sogdiana Jizzakh (Uzbekistan)	0–0 (a.e.t.)	(Malaysia) Kuala Lumpur City
	Report
Penalties
Kakhramonov (penalty scored); Jurabekov (penalty missed); Čermelj (penalty scored); Gafurov (penalty scored)	3–5	(penalty scored) Josué; (penalty scored) Morales; (penalty scored) Hadin; (penalty scored) Akram; (penalty scored) Gallifuoco

Sogdiyona Sport Majmuasi, Jizzakh
Attendance: 6,157
Referee: Ali Sabah (Iraq)

=== Final ===
The final was played over one leg at the Bukit Jalil National Stadium in Kuala Lumpur, Malaysia, between the winners of the Inter-zone play-off final, Kuala Lumpur City, and the winners of the West Asia Zonal final, Al-Seeb.

22 October 2022
19:00 UTC+8

Kuala Lumpur City (Malaysia)	0–3	(Oman) Al-Seeb
	Report	Al-Busaidi 22'; Al-Muqbali 37'; Al-Ghassani 69'

Bukit Jalil National Stadium, Kuala Lumpur
Attendance: 27,722
Referee: Shaun Evans (Australia)

== Top scorers ==
Team eliminated / inactive for this round.
Player is not in the team but team still active for this round.

Rank	Player	Team	MD1	MD2	MD3	ZSF	ZF	ISF	IF	F	Total
1	(Uzbekistan) Jasur Hasanov	(Uzbekistan) Sogdiana Jizzakh		1	2		2				5
1	(Malaysia) Paulo Josué	(Malaysia) Kuala Lumpur City			2		2	1			5
1	(Brazil) Pedro Paulo	(Vietnam) Viettel	3		2						5
4	(Brazil) Pedro Bortoluzo	(Singapore) Hougang United	1	1	2						4
4	(India) Liston Colaco	(India) Mohun Bagan	1	3							4
4	(Jordan) Mahmoud Al-Mardi	(Malaysia) Kedah Darul Aman		1	3						4
4	(Uzbekistan) Shokhruz Norkhonov	(Uzbekistan) Sogdiana Jizzakh		2			1	1			4
4	(Malaysia) Fayadh Zulkifli	(Malaysia) Kedah Darul Aman		2	1	1					4
9	(Bahrain) Kamil Al-Aswad	(Bahrain) Al-Riffa		2	1						3
9	(Spain) Víctor Bertomeu	(Hong Kong) Eastern	2		1						3
9	(Laos) Bounphachan Bounkong	(Laos) Young Elephants	1	1	1						3
9	(Oman) Muhsen Al-Ghassani	(Oman) Al-Seeb		1		1				1	3
9	(Senegal) Ablaye Mbengue	(Kuwait) Al-Arabi	1	1	1						3

== See also ==
- 2022 AFC Champions League
