= 2022 AFC Cup final =

- Event: 2022 AFC Cup
Kuala Lumpur City	Al-Seeb
(Malaysia)	(Oman)
0	3
- Date: 22 October 2022
- Venue: Bukit Jalil National Stadium, Kuala Lumpur
- Referee: Shaun Evans (Australia)
- Attendance: 27,722
- Weather: Light rain 27 °C (81 °F)

The 2022 AFC Cup final was the final match of the 2022 AFC Cup, the 19th edition of the AFC Cup, Asia's secondary club football tournament organized by the Asian Football Confederation (AFC).

The final was contested as a single match between Kuala Lumpur City from Malaysia and Al-Seeb from Oman. The match was played in Kuala Lumpur, Malaysia on 22 October 2022.

== Teams ==
Team	Zone	Previous finals appearances
(Malaysia) Kuala Lumpur City	ASEAN (AFF) (Inter-zone play-off winner)	None
(Oman) Al-Seeb	West Asia Zone (WAFF)	None

== Venue ==
Bukit Jalil National Stadium in Kuala Lumpur, Malaysia hosted the match.

== Road to the final ==
Note: In all results below, the score of the finalist is given first (H: home; A: away).

(Malaysia) Kuala Lumpur City		Round	(Oman) Al-Seeb	
Opponent	Result	Group stage	Opponent	Result
(Indonesia) PSM Makassar	0–0 (A)	Matchday 1	(Syria) Jableh	1–0 (H)
(Singapore) Tampines Rovers	2–1 (H)	Matchday 2	Al-Kuwait	1–2 (A)
–		Matchday 3	(Lebanon) Al-Ansar	4–0 (A)
Group H runner-up: Pos / Team / Pld / Pts; 1 / (Indonesia) PSM Makassar / 2 / 4; 2 / (Malaysia) Kuala Lumpur City (H) / 2 / 4; 3 / (Singapore) Tampines Rovers / 2 / 0; Source: AFC (H) Hosts		Final standings	Group A winners: Pos / Team / Pld / Pts; 1 / (Oman) Al-Seeb (H) / 3 / 6; 2 / Al-Kuwait / 3 / 5; 3 / (Syria) Jableh / 3 / 4; 4 / (Lebanon) Al-Ansar / 3 / 1; Source: AFC (H) Hosts	
Opponent	Score	Knockout stage	Opponent	Score
(Vietnam) Viettel	0–0 (A) (6–5 p)	Zonal semi-finals	(Kuwait) Al-Arabi	2–1 (A) (a.e.t.)
(Indonesia) PSM Makassar	5–2 (H)	Zonal finals	(Bahrain) Al-Riffa	4–0 (H)
(India) ATK Mohun Bagan	3–1 (A)	Inter-zone play-off semi-finals	—	
(Uzbekistan) FC Sogdiana Jizzakh	0–0 (A) (5–3 p)	Inter-zone play-off final	—	

== Format ==
The final was played as a single leg, with the host team (winners of the Inter-zone play-off final) alternated from the previous season's final.

If the game would be tied after regulation time, the winning team would be decided by extra time and, if necessary, a penalty shoot-out.

== Match ==
=== Details ===
22 October 2022
19:00 UTC+8

Kuala Lumpur City (Malaysia)	0–3	(Oman) Al-Seeb
	Report	Al-Busaidi 22'; Al-Muqbali 37'; Al-Ghassani 69'

Bukit Jalil National Stadium, Kuala Lumpur
Attendance: 27,722
Referee: Shaun Evans (Australia)

Kuala Lumpur City	Al-Seeb

GK	1	(Philippines) Kevin Ray Mendoza
RB	4	(Malaysia) Kamal Azizi (substituted off) 85'
CB	9	(Australia) Giancarlo Gallifuoco (yellow card) 57'
CB	17	(Malaysia) Irfan Zakaria
LB	7	(Malaysia) Declan Lambert
DM	8	(Malaysia) Zhafri Yahya (substituted off) 90+1'
MF	6	(Malaysia) Ryan Lambert (substituted off) 71'
MF	14	(Malaysia) Akram Mahinan (yellow card) 52'
MF	16	(Malaysia) Partiban Janasekaran (substituted off) 70'
MF	28	(Brazil) Paulo Josué (c) (substituted off) 90+2'
FW	7	(Colombia) Romel Morales
Substitutes:
FW	37	(Malaysia) Haqimi Azim Rosli (substituted on) 70'
MF	27	(Malaysia) Hadin Azman (substituted on) 71'
DF	25	(Malaysia) Anwar Ibrahim (yellow card) 88' (substituted on) 85'
MF	21	(Malaysia) Kenny Pallraj (substituted on) 90+1'
FW	10	(Malaysia) Safee Sali (substituted on) 90+2'
MF	29	(Malaysia) Arif Shaqirin
FW	30	(Malaysia) Fakrul Aiman Sidid
DF	33	(Malaysia) Muhammad Faudzi
GK	44	(Malaysia) Azri Ghani
Manager:
(Croatia) Bojan Hodak

GK	1	(Oman) Ahmed Al-Rawahi
RB	4	(Oman) Hassan Al-Ajmi
CB	5	(Oman) Juma Al-Habsi
CB	13	(Oman) Mohammed Al-Musalami (yellow card) 80'
LB	17	(Oman) Ali Al-Busaidi
MF	28	(Oman) Mohammed Said Al-Habsi (yellow card) 55' (substituted off) 61'
MF	27	(Oman) Eid Al-Farsi (c) (substituted off) 27'
MF	40	(Nigeria) Daniel Ajibola
MF	28	(Oman) Salaah Al-Yahyaei (substituted off) 75'
FW	9	(Oman) Abdul Aziz Al-Muqbali (substituted off) 88'
FW	16	(Oman) Muhsen Al-Ghassani
Substitutes:
FW	10	(Oman) Ahmed Al-Siyabi (yellow card) 72' (substituted on) 61'
FW	14	(Ghana) Cosmos Dauda (substituted on) 75'
MF	2	(Oman) Mohamed Ramadhan (substituted on) 88'
MF	24	(Oman) Tameem Al-Balushi (substituted on) 89'
FW	8	(Oman) Marwan Mubarak
FW	15	(Oman) Mohamed Al-Hatmi
DF	19	(Oman) Yousuf Al-Malki
MF	38	(Oman) Issam Almakhzoomi
GK	45	(Oman) Muatasim Al-Wahaibi
GK	80	(Oman) Abdullah Al-Shabibi
Manager:
(Oman) Rashid Jaber

Assistant referees:
George Lakrindis (Australia)
Owen Goldrick (Australia)
Fourth official:
Jonathan Barreiro (Australia)
Reserve assistant referee:
Ryan Gallagher (Australia)
Video assistant referee:
Chris Beath (Australia)
Assistant video assistant referee:
Kate Jacewicz (Australia)
Alex King (Australia)

=== Statistics ===
Statistic	Kuala Lumpur City	Al-Seeb
Goals scored	0	3
Total shots	15	10
Shots on target	4	6
Ball possession	30%	70%
Corner kicks	5	4
Fouls conceded	14	9
Offsides	0	1
Yellow cards	3	3
Red cards	0	0
