= 2022 AFC Cup qualifying play-offs =

AFC Cup qualifying play-offs

The 2022 AFC Cup qualifying play-offs were played from 5 to 19 April 2022. A total of ten teams competed in the qualifying play-offs to decide three of the 39 places in the group stage of the 2022 AFC Cup.

== Teams ==
The following 10 teams, split into five zones (West Asia Zone, Central Asia Zone, South Asia Zone, ASEAN Zone, East Asia Zone), entered the qualifying play-offs, consisting of three rounds:

- 4 teams entered in the preliminary round 1.
- 2 teams entered in the preliminary round 2.
- 4 teams entered in the play-off.

Zone	Teams entering in play-off round	Teams entering in preliminary round 2	Teams entering in preliminary round 1
West Asia Zone	None		
South Asia Zone	(Bangladesh) Abahani Limited Dhaka	(India) ATK Mohun Bagan; ~~(Bangladesh) Abahani Limited Dhaka~~ (Note: On 11 April 2022, the AFC announced that Valencia withdrew from the preliminary stage of the qualification, citing financial constraints. Abahani Limited Dhaka advanced to the play-off round.)	(Maldives) Valencia; (Nepal) Machhindra; (Sri Lanka) Blue Star; (Bhutan) Paro
Central Asia Zone	None		
ASEAN Zone	~~(Cambodia) Visakha FC~~ (Note: On 19 January 2022, the AFC announced that the two teams from Myanmar, Shan United and Hanthawaddy United, withdrew from the group stage after the draw. As a result, on 1 March 2022, the AFC decided to cancel the ASEAN zone play-off round match between Visakha FC and Young Elephants, and promote both the participating teams to the group stage to fill the vacant group stage spots.); ~~(Laos) Young Elephants~~		
East Asia Zone	(Hong Kong) Lee Man; (Mongolia) Athletic 220		

== Format ==
In the qualifying play-offs, each tie was played as a single match. Extra time and penalty shoot-out were used to decide the winner if necessary.

== Schedule ==
The schedule of each round was as follows.

Round	Match date
Preliminary round 1	5 April 2022
Preliminary round 2	12 April 2022
Play-off round	19 April 2022

== Bracket ==
The bracket of the qualifying play-offs for each zone was determined based on each team's association ranking, with the team from the higher-ranked association hosting the match. The three winners of the play-off round advanced to the group stage to join the 36 direct entrants.

=== South Asia play-off ===
- (India) ATK Mohun Bagan advanced to Group D.

Preliminary round 1
(Nepal) Machhindra	1
(Sri Lanka) Blue Star	2
(Maldives) Valencia (a.e.t.)	2
(Bhutan) Paro	1

Preliminary round 2
(India) ATK Mohun Bagan	5
(Sri Lanka) Blue Star	0
(Bangladesh) Abahani Limited Dhaka	w/o
(Maldives) Valencia

Play-off round
(India) ATK Mohun Bagan	3
(Bangladesh) Abahani Limited Dhaka	1

=== ASEAN play-off ===
- (Cambodia) Visakha FC advanced to Group G and (Laos) Young Elephants advanced to Group I.

Play-off round
(Cambodia) Visakha FC	—
(Laos) Young Elephants	—

=== East Asia play-off ===
- (Hong Kong) Lee Man advanced to Group J.

Play-off round
(Hong Kong) Lee Man	2
(Mongolia) Athletic 220	1

== Preliminary round 1 ==
=== Summary ===
A total of four teams played in the preliminary round 1.

South Asia Zone
Team 1	Score	Team 2
Machhindra (Nepal)	1–2	(Sri Lanka) Blue Star
Valencia (Maldives)	2–1 (a.e.t.)	(Bhutan) Paro

=== South Asia Zone ===
5 April 2022
17:00 UTC+5:45

Machhindra (Nepal)	1–2	(Sri Lanka) Blue Star
S. Shrestha 90+4'	Report	Ihsan 24'; Sandesh 28'

Dasharath Rangasala, Kathmandu
Attendance: 2,369
Referee: Yousif Saeed Hassan (Iraq)

5 April 2022
22:00 UTC+5

Valencia (Maldives)	2–1 (a.e.t.)	(Bhutan) Paro
Yaameen 18'; Martín 101'	Report	Ellon 27'

National Football Stadium, Malé
Attendance: 0
Referee: Ahmad A'Qashah (Singapore)

== Preliminary round 2 ==
=== Summary ===
A total of four teams played in the preliminary round 2: two teams which entered in this round, and two winners of the preliminary round 1.

South Asia Zone
Team 1	Score	Team 2
ATK Mohun Bagan (India)	5–0	(Sri Lanka) Blue Star
Abahani Limited Dhaka (Bangladesh)	Cancelled	(Maldives) Valencia

=== South Asia Zone ===
12 April 2022
19:30 UTC+5:30

ATK Mohun Bagan (India)	5–0	(Sri Lanka) Blue Star
Kauko 24', 39' (pen.); M. Singh 29', 89'; Williams 77'	Report

Vivekananda Yuba Bharati Krirangan, Kolkata
Attendance: 25,948
Referee: Razlan Joffri Ali (Malaysia)

12 April 2022
18:00 UTC+6

Abahani Limited Dhaka (Bangladesh)	Cancelled	(Maldives) Valencia
	Report

Sylhet District Stadium, Sylhet
Referee: Akhrol Riskullayev (Uzbekistan)

== Play-off round ==
=== Summary ===
A total of six teams played in the play-off round: four teams which entered in this round, and two winners of the preliminary round 2.

South Asia Zone
Team 1	Score	Team 2
ATK Mohun Bagan (India)	3–1	(Bangladesh) Abahani Limited Dhaka

ASEAN Zone
Team 1	Score	Team 2
Visakha FC (Cambodia)	Cancelled	(Laos) Young Elephants

East Zone
Team 1	Score	Team 2
Lee Man (Hong Kong)	2–1	(Mongolia) Athletic 220

=== South Asia Zone ===
19 April 2022
19:00 UTC+5:30

ATK Mohun Bagan (India)	3–1	(Bangladesh) Abahani Limited Dhaka
Williams 6', 30', 85'	Report	Colindres 61'

Vivekananda Yuba Bharati Krirangan, Kolkata
Attendance: 31,925
Referee: Seyed Vahid Kazemi (Iran)

=== ASEAN Zone ===
Visakha FC (Cambodia)	Cancelled	(Laos) Young Elephants
	Report

Visakha Stadium, Phnom Penh

=== East Asia Zone ===
19 April 2022
15:00 UTC+8

Lee Man (Hong Kong)	2–1	(Mongolia) Athletic 220
Dutra 13'; Tsui Wang Kit 61'	Report	Murayama 7'

MFF Football Centre, Ulaanbaatar (Note: After the 2021–22 Hong Kong Premier League season was cancelled on 25 February 2022, due to the SARS-CoV-2 Omicron variant spread in Hong Kong, the Hong Kong clubs announced that they would train overseas for their respective Asian campaigns. Hence, Lee Man asked their playoff round match against Athletic 220 to be moved to a different venue, which was later decided to be Athletic 220's home venue MFF Football Centre in Ulaanbaatar.)
Attendance: 482
Referee: Pranjal Banerjee (India)
