= Eid Al-Farsi =

Omani footballer (born 1990)

Personal information
- Full name: Eid Mohammed Al-Farsi
- Date of birth: 8 November 1990 (age 36)
- Place of birth: Sur, Oman
- Height: 1.83 m (6 ft 0 in)
- Position: Central midfielder

Team information
- Current team: Al-Seeb
- Number: 27

Youth career
- 2002–2008: Al-Oruba

Senior career*
Years	Team	Apps	(Gls)
2008–2013	Al-Oruba	69	(4)
2013–2014	Al-Nahda	27	(2)
2014–2015	Al-Oruba	5	(1)
2015–2016	Al-Raed		
2019–	Al-Seeb	75	(7)

International career^{‡}
2011	Oman U-23	2	(0)
2010–	Oman	70	(6)
- * Club domestic league appearances and goals ‡ National team caps and goals as of 29 April 2023

Eid Mohammed Al-Farsi (Arabic: عِيد مُحَمَّد الْفَارِسِيّ; born 8 November 1990), commonly known as Eid Al-Farsi, is an Omani footballer who plays for Al-Seeb in the Oman Professional League.

== Club career ==
On 5 July 2013, he signed a one-year contract with Al-Nahda Club. On 5 July 2014, he moved back to his former club, Al-Oruba SC on a one-year contract.

=== Wigan trial ===
After the transfer closes on 2012, English top flight club Wigan Athletic asked Oman Football Association to allow Eid to visit United Kingdom for a trial with Wigan.

=== Club career statistics ===
Club	Season	Division	League		Cup		Continental (Note: Includes appearances in the AFC Cup)		Other (Note: Includes goal in the GCC Champions League)		Total	
Club	Season	Division	Apps	Goals	Apps	Goals	Apps	Goals	Apps	Goals	Apps	Goals
Al-Oruba	2010–11	Oman Elite League	-	1	-	0	6	1	-	0	-	2
Al-Oruba	2011–12	Oman Elite League	-	2	-	1	4	0	-	0	-	3
Al-Oruba	2012–13	Oman Elite League	-	1	-	0	0	0	-	0	-	1
Al-Oruba	Total		-	4	-	1	10	1	-	0	-	6
Al-Nahda	2013–14	Oman Professional League	-	2	-	1	0	0	-	1	-	4
Al-Nahda	Total		-	2	-	1	0	0	-	1	-	4
Career total			-	6	-	2	10	1	-	1	-	10

== International career ==
Eid is part of the first team squad of the Oman national football team. He was selected for the national team for the first time in 2010. He made his first appearance for Oman on 20 January 2010 in a friendly match against Sweden. and scored his first international goal on 11 September 2012 in a friendly match against Ireland. He has made appearances in the 2014 FIFA World Cup qualification, the 21st Arabian Gulf Cup and the 2015 AFC Asian Cup qualification.

== National team career statistics ==
=== International goals ===
Scores and results list Oman's goal tally first.

No.	Date	Venue	Opponent	Score	Result	Competition
1.	11 September 2012	Craven Cottage, London, England	Republic of Ireland	1–3	1–4	Friendly
2.	14 August 2013	Jalan Besar Stadium, Kallang, Singapore	Singapore	2–0	2–0	2015 AFC Asian Cup qualification
3.	19 November 2013	Shahid Dastgerdi Stadium, Ekbatan, Tehran, Iran	Syria	1–0	1–0	2015 AFC Asian Cup qualification
4.	29 May 2014	Metallurg Stadium, Olmaliq, Uzbekistan	Uzbekistan	1–0	1–0	Friendly
5.	26 March 2015	Al-Seeb Stadium, Seeb, Oman	Malaysia	3–0	6–0	Friendly
6.	19 November 2018	Sultan Qaboos Sports Complex, Muscat, Oman	Bahrain	1–0	2–1	Friendly

== Honours ==
Al-Oruba

- Sultan Qaboos Cup: 2010
- Omani Super Cup: 2011

Al-Nahda

- Oman Professional League: 2013–14

Al-Seeb

- AFC Cup: 2022

Individual

- AFC Cup Best Player: 2022
