= Omar Al-Malki =

Omani professional footballer (born 1994)

Personal information
- Birth name: Omar Mohammed Rashid Al-Malki
- Date of birth: January 4, 1994 (age 32)
- Place of birth: Al-Ghubra, Oman
- Height: 1.83 m (6 ft 0 in)
- Position: Forward

Team information
- Current team: Al-Seeb Club

Senior career*
| Years | Team | Apps | (Gls) |
| 2012–2016 | Al-Seeb Club | | |
| 2016–2018 | Al-Shabab | | |
| 2018–2020 | Al-Nasr | | |
| 2020–2022 | Dhofar Club | | |
| 2022–2023 | Al-Riffa | | |
| 2023–2024 | Al-Nahda | | |
| 2024– | Al-Seeb Club | | |

International career^{‡}
| 2014 | Oman U23 | 2 | (0) |
| 2016– | Oman | 17 | (5) |
- * Club domestic league appearances and goals ‡ National team caps and goals as of 21 January 2024

Omar Mohammed Rashid Al-Malki (Arabic: عُمَر مُحَمَّد رَاشِد الْمَالِكِيّ; born 4 January 1994) is an Omani professional footballer who plays as a forward for Al-Seeb Club and the Oman national team.

== Career ==
Al-Malki began his senior career with Al-Seeb Club in the Oman Professional League in 2014. On 17 August 2016, he moved to Al-Shabab, and followed that up with a stint at Al-Nasr. On 6 January 2020, he moved to Dhofar Clubwhere he won the 2020 and 2021 Sultan Qaboos Cup, and the 2020 Oman Super Cup. On 10 October 2020, he extended his contract with Dhofar. In 2022, he abroad for the first time with the Bahraini club Al-Riffa. After one season, he returned to Oman in 2023 with Al-Nahda.

== International ==
Al-Malki was first called up to the senior Oman national team in a friendly 1–0 win over Turkmenistan on 8 August 2016. He was called up to the national team for the 24th Arabian Gulf Cup. He was called up to the national team for the 2023 AFC Asian Cup.

=== International goals ===
| No | Date | Venue | Opponent | Score | Result | Competition |
|---|---|---|---|---|---|---|
| 1. | 3 June 2022 | Suheim bin Hamad Stadium, Doha, Qatar | Nepal | 1–0 | 2–0 | Friendly |
| 2. | 23 September 2022 | King Abdullah II Stadium, Amman, Jordan | Iraq | 1–0 | 1–1 | Friendly |
| 3. | 19 January 2023 | Basra International Stadium, Basra, Iraq | Iraq | 2–2 | 2–3 (a.e.t.) | 25th Arabian Gulf Cup |
| 4. | 16 November 2023 | Sultan Qaboos Sports Complex, Muscat, Oman | Chinese Taipei | 1–0 | 3–0 | 2026 FIFA World Cup qualification |
| 5. | 26 March 2024 | Bukit Jalil National Stadium, Kuala Lumpur, Malaysia | Malaysia | 1–0 | 2–0 | 2026 FIFA World Cup qualification |

== Honours ==
Dhofar Club

- Sultan Qaboos Cup: 2019–20, 2020–21
- Oman Super Cup: 2019–20
