= Paulo Josué =

Malaysian footballer

Paulo Josué dos Reis
Personal information
- Full name: Paulo Josué Stürmer dos Reis
- Date of birth: 13 March 1989 (age 37)
- Place of birth: Canela, Brazil
- Height: 1.83 m (6 ft 0 in)
- Position: Forward

Team information
- Current team: Kuala Lumpur City
- Number: 28

Senior career*
Years	Team	Apps	(Gls)
2011–2012	Juventude	1	(0)
2013	Esportivo	15	(5)
2013–2014	Juventude	6	(1)
2014	Passo Fundo	2	(0)
2014	Marcílio Dias	6	(1)
2015	Lajeadense	13	(1)
2015	Votuporanguense	8	(1)
2015–2016	Lajeadense	3	(0)
2017	Votuporanguense	15	(2)
2017	Boa Esporte	0	(0)
2017–	Kuala Lumpur City	191	(75)

International career^{‡}
2023–	Malaysia	42	(14)
Medal record
Men's football
Representing Malaysia
FIFA ASEAN Cup
Third place	2026 Indonesia	Team
- * Club domestic league appearances and goals as of 27 September 2025 ‡ National team caps and goals as of 17 November 2026

Paulo Josué Stürmer dos Reis (born 13 March 1989) is a professional footballer who plays as an attacking midfielder or a forward for Malaysia Super League club Kuala Lumpur City which he captains. Born in Brazil, he plays for the Malaysia national team.

Josué also holds the records for being both the all-time top scorer and the player with the highest number of appearances for Kuala Lumpur City in their history.

== Club career ==
=== Career in Brazil ===
Josué had played with six different Brazilian clubs before moving abroad.

=== Kuala Lumpur City ===
On 2 June 2017, Josué joined Malaysia Premier League club Kuala Lumpur City in a mid-season transfer. He scored 6 goals from 9 league matches and helped the club win the 2017 Malaysia Premier League which saw the club promoted to the 2018 Malaysia Super League. Josué scored 7 goals during his debut in the Malaysia Super League. His contribution helped Kuala Lumpur maintain its top-flight status in the Malaysia Super League.

In the 2019 season, Josué did not manage to stop the club from being relegated as the club finished bottom of the table.

Josué was made the captain of Kuala Lumpur City in 2020, a rare achievement for a foreign player.

In the 2021 season, Josué captained the team to the final of the 2021 Malaysia Cup. Against the overwhelming favourites Johor Darul Ta'zim, Kuala Lumpur City managed to beat the odds and won the game 2–0. Josué scored the second goal to claim the cup. He also notably scored a hat-trick in a 3–1 league win over Penang on 4 May 2021 and also recorded a hat-trick of assist in a league match against Perak on 17 March 2021 in a 3–0 win during the season.

On 9 April 2022, Josué scored a brace in a 2–0 win over Melaka United to gain the 3 points in the league. During the 2022 AFC Cup campaign, Josué scored a brace in a 2–1 win over Singaporean side Tampines Rovers on 30 June 2022. The win helped his side qualify for the knockout stage of the AFC Cup, where they faced Vietnamese side Viettel and defeated them in a penalty shoot-out. Josué would then go on to score a brace in a 5–2 home win against Indonesian club PSM Makassar on 24 August, which saw Kuala Lumpur City advance to the quarter-finals against Indian club ATK Mohun Bagan at the Salt Lake Stadium on 7 September. Josué scored in the 60th minute before the opponent scored in the 90th minute to equalise the match at 1–1. With five minutes added in stoppage time, Josué assisted Fakrul Aiman in the 90+2nd minute, who scored the winner. In the 90+5th minute, Romel Morales sealed the victory with a scoreline of 3–1, which enabled the club to advance to the semi-final against Uzbekistani club Sogdiana Jizzakh at the Sogdiyona Sport Majmuasi. Josué aided his team in another penalty shoot-out, which saw Kuala Lumpur City advance to the 2022 AFC Cup Final against Omani club Al-Seeb at the Bukit Jalil National Stadium on 22 October. Unfortunately, Kuala Lumpur City lost the final in a 3–0 defeat.

In 2023, Josué helped Kuala Lumpur City advance to the 2023 Malaysia FA Cup final but lost to Johor Darul Ta'zim 2–0.

During the 2024–25 ASEAN Club Championship against Philippines club Kaya–Iloilo on 22 August, Josué assisted Haqimi Azim to score the winner. On 14 September 2024, Josué scored his first club hat-trick in a 5–0 league win over Kedah Darul Aman. On 1 December 2024, Josué made history by surpassing Fandi Ahmad as the top goalscorer of all time for Kuala Lumpur City. He went on to win the FAM Football Awards 'Best Striker' award for the 2024–25 season. It was also his best season during his time with the club where he went on to score 20 goals and recorded 11 assists in 29 appearances across all competition played.

== International career ==
Having played in Malaysia for the past seven years, Josué obtained Malaysian citizenship on 25 February 2023, allowing him to be registered as a local player and making him eligible for selection to the Malaysia national team. He received his first call-up on 18 March 2023 for a training camp ahead of friendly matches against Turkmenistan and Hong Kong. He made his debut for Malaysia against Turkmenistan on 23 March 2023 at the Sultan Ibrahim Stadium.

He played as a false nine in the starting line-up against the Solomon Islands in a friendly and scored his first international goal on 14 June 2023 at the Sultan Mizan Zainal Abidin Stadium. He was deployed in the same role again against the Papua New Guinea in another international friendly on 20 June 2023, where he scored his first international hat-trick in a 10–0 victory for Malaysia at the same venue.

Josué also represented the nation at the 2023 AFC Asian Cup held in Qatar. On 25 January 2024, with Malaysia trailing 2–3 against South Korea, he assisted the goal scored by Romel Morales in the 90+15th minute of stoppage time, securing Malaysia their first point of the tournament.

During the 2024 ASEAN Championship match against the Timor-Leste, with Malaysia trailing 2–1, he scored a brace to secure a 3–2 comeback win and all three points for the team.

Josué was than selected as the captain for Malaysia during the 2026 ASEAN Championship where he went on to score a brace in the first match in a 2–1 win against Myanmar on 25 July 2026.

== Career statistics ==
=== Club ===
As of 1 July 2026

Appearances and goals by club, season and competition
Club	Season	League		National cup (Note: Includes Malaysia FA Cup)		League cup (Note: Includes Malaysia Cup and Malaysia Challenge Cup)		Continental (Note: Includes AFC Cup)		Total	
Club	Season	Apps	Goals	Apps	Goals	Apps	Goals	Apps	Goals	Apps	Goals
Kuala Lumpur	2017	9	6	–		6	0	–		15	6
Kuala Lumpur	2018	21	7	4	2	5	1	–		30	10
Kuala Lumpur	2019	21	2	3	1	5	4	–		29	7
Kuala Lumpur	2020	10	4	0	0	0	0	–		10	4
Kuala Lumpur	2021	20	10	0	0	11	1	–		31	11
Kuala Lumpur	2022	20	6	2	1	4	1	7	5	34	13
Kuala Lumpur	2023	24	11	3	0	4	0	1	0	31	11
Kuala Lumpur	2024–25	22	17	1	1	2	1	4	1	29	20
Kuala Lumpur	2025–26	21	5	1	0	6	2	0	0	28	7
Kuala Lumpur	Total	168	68	14	5	43	10	12	6	237	89
Career total		168	68	14	5	43	10	12	6	237	89

=== International ===
As of match played 6 October 2026

Appearances and goals by national team and year
National team	Year	Apps	Goals
Malaysia	2023	8	4
Malaysia	2024	16	4
Malaysia	2025	5	2
Malaysia	2026	11	4
Total		40	14

List of international goals scored by Paulo Josué
No.	Date	Venue	Opponent	Score	Result	Competition
1	14 June 2023	Sultan Mizan Zainal Abidin Stadium, Terengganu, Malaysia	Solomon Islands	1–1	4–1	Friendly
2	20 June 2023	Sultan Mizan Zainal Abidin Stadium, Terengganu, Malaysia	Papua New Guinea	2–0	10–0	Friendly
3	20 June 2023	Sultan Mizan Zainal Abidin Stadium, Terengganu, Malaysia	Papua New Guinea	6–0	10–0	Friendly
4	20 June 2023	Sultan Mizan Zainal Abidin Stadium, Terengganu, Malaysia	Papua New Guinea	7–0	10–0	Friendly
5	11 June 2024	Bukit Jalil National Stadium, Kuala Lumpur, Malaysia	Chinese Taipei	2–1	3–1	2026 FIFA World Cup qualification
6	18 November 2024	G. M. C. Balayogi Athletic Stadium, Gachibowli, India	India	1–0	1–1	Friendly
7	11 December 2024	Bukit Jalil National Stadium, Kuala Lumpur, Malaysia	Timor-Leste	2–2	3–2	2024 ASEAN Championship
8	11 December 2024	Bukit Jalil National Stadium, Kuala Lumpur, Malaysia	Timor-Leste	3–2	3–2	2024 ASEAN Championship
9	29 May 2025	Kuala Lumpur Stadium, Kuala Lumpur	Cape Verde	1–1	1–1	Friendly
10	14 October 2025	Bukit Jalil National Stadium, Kuala Lumpur, Malaysia	Laos	5–1	5–1	2027 AFC Asian Cup qualification
11	25 July 2026	Thuwunna Stadium, Yangon, Myanmar	Myanmar	1–1	2–1	2026 ASEAN Championship
12	25 July 2026	Thuwunna Stadium, Yangon, Myanmar	Myanmar	2–1	2–1	2026 ASEAN Championship
13	28 July 2026	Kuala Lumpur Stadium, Kuala Lumpur, Malaysia	Laos	1–0	4–0	2026 ASEAN Championship
14	1 October 2026	Si Jalak Harupat Stadium, Bandung, Indonesia	Singapore	4–0	6–0	2026 FIFA ASEAN Cup

== Honours ==
=== Club ===
Kuala Lumpur City

- Malaysia Cup: 2021
- Malaysia Premier League: 2017
- AFC Cup runner-up: 2022

=== International ===
Malaysia

- Merdeka Tournament: 2024

=== Individual ===
- AFC Cup Top goal scorer: 2022
- FAM Football Awards – Best Striker: 2024–25
