= Pedro Paulo (footballer, born 1994) =

Brazilian footballer

Personal information
- Full name: Pedro Paulo Alves Vieira dos Reis
- Date of birth: 10 February 1994 (age 32)
- Place of birth: Piraí, Rio de Janeiro, Brazil
- Height: 1.86 m (6 ft 1 in)
- Position: Forward

Team information
- Current team: Chanthaburi
- Number: 77

Youth career
- 2009–2013: Cruzeiro

Senior career*
Years	Team	Apps	(Gls)
2014–2017	Cruzeiro	0	(0)
2014–2015	→ Athletico Paranaense (loan)	2	(0)
2015–2016	→ Rio Ave (loan)	0	(0)
2016	→ Académico de Viseu (loan)	3	(0)
2017	→ Lampang (loan)	0	(0)
2018–2019	Lampang	0	(0)
2019–2020	Saigon	41	(24)
2020–2022	Viettel	20	(4)
2023	Nakhon Si United	13	(1)
2024–	Chanthaburi	2	(0)

International career
2011	Brazil U17	8	(2)
Medal record
Men's football
Representing Brazil
South American U-17 Championship
Winner	2011 Ecuador
- * Club domestic league appearances and goals as of 13 January 2024

Pedro Paulo Alves Vieira dos Reis (born 10 February 1994), known as Pedro Paulo, is a Brazilian professional footballer who plays as a forward for Thai League 2 club Chanthaburi.

== Club career ==
Born in Arrozal, a district of Piraí, Rio de Janeiro, Pedro Paulo began his career at Cruzeiro and, on 6 November 2014, was loaned to fellow Série A team Athletico Paranaense. He was first included in a matchday squad on 2 November 2014, remaining an unused substitute in their 1–0 home win over Atlético Mineiro in Série A. Three weeks later he made his professional debut, as an added-time replacement for Marcelo Cirino at the end of a 2–1 win at Bahia. On 7 December, in the last game of the season, he made his only other appearance in a 1–1 draw at Palmeiras, again off the bench. In February 2015, he made three substitute appearances in the season's Campeonato Paranaense.

On 13 July 2015, he was loaned out again, to Portugal's Rio Ave, for the upcoming Primeira Liga campaign.

== International career ==
Paulo was part of the Brazil U17 squad which won the 2011 South American U-17 Championship, playing eight games and scoring twice in a 4–3 win over Venezuela in the opener on 13 March.

== Honours ==
Brazil U17

- South American U-17 Championship: 2011

Individual

- V.League 1 top goalscorer: 2020
- AFC Cup top goalscorer: 2022
