= Lee Jae-gun =

South Korean footballer

Lee Jae-gun 이재건
Personal information
- Full name: Lee Jae-gun
- Date of birth: 22 February 1997 (age 29)
- Place of birth: Seongnam, South Korea
- Height: 1.80 m (5 ft 11 in)
- Position: Forward

Team information
- Current team: Pocheon Citizen FC
- Number: 97

Youth career
- Kyunghee High School
- –2017: Songho College

Senior career*
Years	Team	Apps	(Gls)
2017–2019	Tubize-Braine	38	(1)
2019	Asan Mugunghwa	16	(0)
2020–2021	Chungnam Asan	25	(4)
2021–2022	Visakha	30	(8)
- * Club domestic league appearances and goals as of 19 July 2021

- Lee Jae-gun
- Hangul: 이재건
- RR: I Jaegeon
- MR: I Chaegŏn

Lee Jae-gun (Korean: 이재건; born 22 February 1997) is a South Korean footballer who plays as a forward for K4 League club Pocheon Citizen FC.

== Playing career ==
After graduating from Kyunghee High School in Seoul, Lee received several offers from professional clubs. He turned them down, however, to play for Songho College. In his second season at the college, he scored five of his team's ten goals, and took his school to the 2016 U-League championship game, where they lost to Korea University.

He was selected to represent Korea at the 2016 Asian University Football Championships in Taebaek.

In January 2017, he signed his first professional contract with A.F.C. Tubize, playing in the second-tier of Belgian football. He became Tubize's sixth Korean player. The team, which was purchased by a Korean company in 2014, promotes the development of Korean football by recruiting young prospects from the Asian country. He made his debut on 7 January against Cercle Brugge, replacing Shean Garlito in the 89th minute. Two months later, during a 1-1 draw against Oud-Heverlee Leuven, Lee scored his debut goal.
