= Ali Haram =

Bahraini footballer

Personal information
- Full name: Ali Abdulla Hassan Haram
- Date of birth: 11 December 1988 (age 37)
- Place of birth: Sitrah, Bahrain
- Height: 1.84 m (6 ft 0 in)
- Position: Midfielder

Team information
- Current team: Al-Riffa

Senior career*
Years	Team	Apps	(Gls)
2008–2012	Sitra		
2012–2015	Al Hala		
2015–2016	Hidd		
2016–2018	Manama		
2018–	Al-Riffa		
2021–2022	→ Al-Tadamon (loan)		

International career
2012–2025	Bahrain	58	(5)
- * Club domestic league appearances and goals as of 14:23, 5 January 2021 (UTC)

Ali Abdulla Hassan Haram (Arabic: عَلِيّ عَبْد الله حَسَن حَرَم; born 11 December 1988) is a Bahraini footballer who plays as a midfielder for Al-Riffa and the Bahrain national team.

== Career ==
Haram was included in Bahrain's squad for the 2019 AFC Asian Cup in the United Arab Emirates.

He played in the qualification match for the 2021 FIFA Arab Cup, scoring a goal in the match against Kuwait.

== Career statistics ==
=== International ===
As of 26 January 2024

Bahrain
Year	Apps	Goals
2012	2	0
2016	2	0
2017	1	0
2018	1	0
2019	10	0
2020	3	0
2021	11	2
2022	11	3
2023	6	0
2024	0	0
Total	47	5

International goals by date, venue, opponent, score, result and competition
No.	Date	Venue	Opponent	Score	Result	Competition
1	25 June 2021	Khalifa International Stadium, Isa Town, Bahrain	Kuwait	1–0	2–0	2021 FIFA Arab Cup qualification
2	1 September 2021	Bahrain National Stadium, Riffa, Bahrain	Haiti	6–1	6–1	Friendly
3	8 June 2022	Bukit Jalil National Stadium, Kuala Lumpur, Malaysia	Bangladesh	1–0	2–0	2023 AFC Asian Cup qualification
4	11 June 2022	Bukit Jalil National Stadium, Kuala Lumpur, Malaysia	Malaysia	1–1	2–1	2023 AFC Asian Cup qualification
5	23 September 2022	Bahrain National Stadium, Riffa, Bahrain	Cape Verde	1–1	1–2	Friendly
