= Shaun Evans (referee) =

Australian soccer referee

- Born: 21 October 1987 (age 39); Victoria, Australia
- Other occupation: Bricklayer

Domestic
Years	League	Role
2008–2012	A-League	Assistant referee
2012–	A-League	Referee

International
Years	League	Role
2017–	FIFA listed	Referee

Shaun Evans (born 21 October 1987) is an Australian soccer referee.

He began officiating in the A-League as an assistant referee in 2008, and was promoted to referee in 2012. He was named as a full-time Football Australia referee in 2016, and the following year he was named on the FIFA International Referees List. He was voted Referee of the Year in the 2018–19 A-League.

Evans refereed in the 2019 A-League Grand Final, the 2021 FFA Cup Final and the 2022 AFC Cup Final. He has also officiated in the Chinese Super League and Indonesian Liga 1, as well as the 2014 Chinese FA Cup Final. He was selected as a Video Assistant Referee at the 2022 and 2026 FIFA World Cup, and a referee at the 2023 AFC Asian Cup.

== Refereeing career ==
Born in the state of Victoria, Evans began officiating in the A-League as an assistant referee in 2008, being promoted to referee for 2012–13. In August 2016, Football Australia CEO David Gallop named him as one of three full-time professional referees, alongside Jarred Gillett and Chris Beath and replacing the retired Ben Williams. Before this promotion, he was a bricklayer. At the start of 2017, he was one of five Australian male referees put on FIFA's list of international referees. He officiated an international friendly between Uzbekistan and Lebanon in November 2018.

Evans refereed four Chinese Super League games in 2013, and the first leg of the Chinese FA Cup final in 2014. In 2017, he was enlisted to officiate in the Indonesian Liga 1. Evans was voted Referee of the Year in the 2018–19 A-League, meaning he was named for the Grand Final.

In October 2016, Evans gave Jack Clisby of Western Sydney Wanderers a yellow card and not a red for a foul that injured Sergio Cirio of Adelaide United. Adelaide chairman Greg Griffen wrote to Football Australia requesting that Evans never referee their matches again, a demand that was rejected.

In February 2022, Evans was in charge of the 2021 FFA Cup Final, which Melbourne Victory won 2–1 against Central Coast Mariners. Later that month, a Football Australia review found that Evans made two incorrect decisions regarding penalty kicks, both of which went in favour of Melbourne City, who defeated the Mariners 3–2. In October, he led an all-Australian officiating team for the AFC Cup final in Kuala Lumpur.

Evans was selected as one of 24 Video Assistant Referees (VAR) at the 2022 FIFA World Cup in Qatar. At the 2023 AFC Asian Cup in the same country, he officiated in an opening group match between Saudi Arabia and Oman, in which the former scored the winning goal in added time; he at first concurred with his assistant's decision that the goal was offside, before reversing it through VAR.

Evans was selected as one of the Video Assistant Referees (VAR) at the 2026 FIFA World Cup. At this World Cup, preceding the match between Germany and Curaçao, Evans was seen "making the fingers of his right hand into a [sic] upside down "OK" sign". According to BBC Sport, this gesture can be interpreted as "The circle" game as popularised by American sitcom Malcom in the Middle or a gesture appropriated by white supremacists. Evans stated that the gesture was "an involuntary, subconscious twitch" that he was "unaware" of. FIFA took no further action.
