= Shakhboz Jurabekov =

Uzbek footballer (born 1997)

Shahboz Joʻrabekov
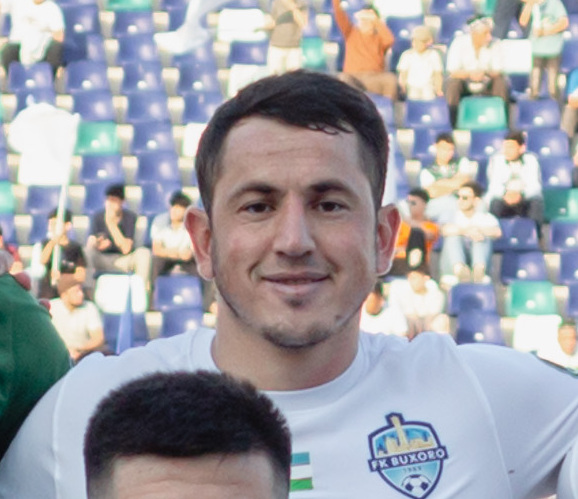

Personal information
- Full name: Shahboz Qobil o'g'li Joʻrabekov
- Date of birth: February 2, 1997 (age 29)
- Place of birth: Jizzakh, Uzbekistan
- Height: 1.82 m (6 ft 0 in)
- Position: Defender

Team information
- Current team: Buxoro
- Number: 97

Youth career
- 2012-2015: Sogdiana Jizzakh

Senior career*
Years	Team	Apps	(Gls)
2015-2022	Sogdiana Jizzakh	100	(7)
2023	Navbahor Namangan	14	(1)
2024	Qizilqum Zarafshon	12	(2)
2024	Bunyodkor	11	(0)
2025-	Bukhara	41	(3)

International career
2018-2019	Uzbekistan U-23	3	(0)
- * Club domestic league appearances and goals as of 28 July 2026

Shakhboz Jurabekov (Uzbek: Shahboz Qobil o'g'li Joʻrabekov, Russian: Шахбоз Кабул угли Журабеков; born 2 February 1997) is an Uzbek professional association football player who plays as a defender. He currently plays for Bukhara. He previously played for Sogdiana Jizzakh and Navbahor Namangan.

== Playing career ==
Shahboz studied at the Jizzakh football school. His first professional club was Sogdiana Jizzakh, where he was promoted to the senior team in 2015 by head coach Davron Fayziyev. He made his first-team debut in 2017.

Joʻrabekov represented the Jizzakh club for seven seasons and helped the team finish second in the Uzbekistan Super League during the 2021 Uzbekistan Super League season. In the 2022 season he also made his first appearance in an international competition, participating in the AFC Cup.

At the end of the 2022 season he left Sogdiana Jizzakh. In the 2023 season he signed a contract with Navbahor Namangan, leaving the club at the end of that season.

In January 2024 he signed a contract with Qizilqum Zarafshon.

== Honours ==
=== Club ===
Bukhara

- Uzbekistan Cup runner-up: 2025

Sogdiana Jizzakh

- Uzbekistan Super League runner-up: 2021

Navbahor Namangan

- Uzbekistan Super League third place: 2023

== Personal life ==
Shahboz is the son of well-known footballer Qobil Aliqulov, who played for many years as a forward for Sogdiana Jizzakh.
