= Abdulla Shallal =

Bahraini footballer

Personal information
- Date of birth: 31 January 1993 (age 33)
- Place of birth: Manama, Bahrain
- Height: 1.75 m (5 ft 9 in)
- Position: Defender

Team information
- Current team: Riffa
- Number: 5

Youth career
- 2010–2012: Riffa

Senior career*
Years	Team	Apps	(Gls)
2012–	Riffa		

International career
2014–	Bahrain U23	1	(0)
- * Club domestic league appearances and goals

Abdulla Shallal (born 12 June 1993) is a Bahraini professional footballer who plays as a defender who currently plays for Riffa and Bahrain.
