= Jasim Khelaif =

Bahraini footballer

Personal information
- Full name: Jasim Khelaif Wahab Al Salama
- Date of birth: 22 February 1998 (age 28)
- Place of birth: Manama, Bahrain
- Height: 1.75 m (5 ft 9 in)
- Position: Midfielder

Team information
- Current team: East Riffa
- Number: 8

Youth career
- East Riffa

Senior career*
Years	Team	Apps	(Gls)
2016–	East Riffa		
2019–2020	→ Al-Hala (loan)		
2020–2021	→ Budaiya (loan)		
2025	Malkiya		
2025–	A'Ali	14	(0)

International career^{‡}
2018–2021	Bahrain U23	6	(0)
2021–	Bahrain	14	(0)
- * Club domestic league appearances and goals as of 7 February 2022 ‡ National team caps and goals as of August 2026

Jasim Khelaif Wahab Al Salama (Arabic: جَاسِم خَلِيف وَهَّاب السَّلَامَة; born 22 February 1998) is a Bahraini footballer who plays as a midfielder for Bahraini Premier League club A'Ali and the Bahrain national team.

== Club career ==
Khelaif was a member of the East Riffa youth academy until 2016 when he was promoted to the first team. He took part in East Riffa's 2022 AFC Cup campaign, scoring one goal as the team reached the West Zone semi final before losing against Al-Riffa.

In 2019, Khelaif signed for Al-Hala on a one-season loan deal.

In 2020, Khelaif was once again loaned out, to Budaiya.

== International career ==
In June 2019, he took part in the Maurice Revello Tournament in France In January 2024, Khelaif featured in the Bahrain national team 26-men squad for the 2023 AFC Asian Cup.

== Honours ==
East Riffa

- Bahraini FA Cup: 2019
