= Ahmed Al-Siyabi =

Omani footballer (born 1993)

Personal information
- Full name: Ahmed Khalfan Muhail Al-Siyabi
- Date of birth: 16 July 1993 (age 33)
- Place of birth: Sur, Oman
- Height: 1.65 m (5 ft 5 in)
- Position: Forward

Team information
- Current team: Sur
- Number: 10

Youth career
- Sur

Senior career*
| Years | Team | Apps | (Gls) |
| | Sur | | (4) |

International career
| 2014– | Oman U-23 | 2 | (0) |
| 2012– | Oman | 3 | (0) |
- * Club domestic league appearances and goals

Ahmed Khalfan Muhail Al-Siyabi (Arabic: أحمد خلفان مهيل السيابي; born 16 July 1993), commonly known as Ahmed Al-Siyabi, is an Omani footballer who plays for Sur SC in the Oman Professional League.

== Club career statistics ==
| Club | Season | Division | League | | Cup | | Continental | | Other | | Total | |
| Club | Season | Division | Apps | Goals | Apps | Goals | Apps | Goals | Apps | Goals | Apps | Goals |
|---|---|---|---|---|---|---|---|---|---|---|---|---|
| Sur | 2013–14 | Oman Professional League | - | 4 | - | 0 | 0 | 0 | - | 0 | - | 4 |
| Sur | Total | | - | 4 | - | 0 | 0 | 0 | - | 0 | - | 4 |
| Career total | | | - | 4 | - | 0 | 0 | 0 | - | 0 | - | 4 |

== International career ==
Ahmed was selected for the national team for the first time in 2012. He made his first appearance for Oman on 25 December 2013 against Kuwait in the 2012 WAFF Championship. He has made an appearances in the 2012 WAFF Championship.

== Honours ==
=== Club ===
- With Sur

- Oman Professional League Cup (1): 2007
