= Faisal Bodahoom =

Bahraini footballer (born 1988)

Personal information
- Full name: Faisal Hasan Ali Hasan Abudahoom
- Date of birth: 25 September 1988 (age 38)
- Place of birth: Sitra, Bahrain
- Position: Forward

Team information
- Current team: Riffa
- Number: 16

Senior career*
Years	Team	Apps	(Gls)
2008–2012	East Riffa		(11)
2012–2014	Riffa		(3)
2014–	East Riffa		(3)

International career^{‡}
2012–	Bahrain	15	(1)
- * Club domestic league appearances and goals as of 01:04, 17 January 2015 (UTC) ‡ National team caps and goals as of 00:27, 17 January 2015 (UTC)

Faisal Hasan Ali Hasan Abudahoom (Arabic: فيصل حسن علي حسن بودهوم; born 25 September 1988) is a Bahraini professional footballer who plays as a forward for Riffa.

== Career statistics ==
=== International ===
Scores and results list Bahrain's goal tally first.

Goal	Date	Venue	Opponent	Score	Result	Competition
1.	21 December 2013	Jassim Bin Hamad Stadium, Doha, Qatar	Qatar	1–0	1–1	Friendly

== Honours ==
Riffa

- Bahraini Premier League: 2013–14
- Bahraini FA Cup: 2013–14
- Bahraini King's Cup runner-up: 2013
