= Bùi Duy Thường =

Vietnamese footballer (born 1996)

Personal information
- Full name: Bùi Duy Thường
- Date of birth: 5 April 1996 (age 30)
- Place of birth: Sóc Sơn, Hanoi, Vietnam
- Height: 1.75 m (5 ft 9 in)
- Positions: Wing back; central midfielder

Team information
- Current team: Hồng Lĩnh Hà Tĩnh
- Number: 7

Youth career
- 2012–2014: Viettel

Senior career*
Years	Team	Apps	(Gls)
2015–2023	Viettel	127	(13)
2023	Becamex Bình Dương	23	(1)
2024–	Hồng Lĩnh Hà Tĩnh	47	(0)

International career^{‡}
2017–2018	Vietnam U21	1	(0)
- * Club domestic league appearances and goals as of 7 June 2026 ‡ National team caps and goals as of 28 July 2018

Bùi Duy Thường (born 5 April 1996) is a Vietnamese professional footballer who plays as a wing back or central midfielder for V.League 1 club Hồng Lĩnh Hà Tĩnh

== Honours ==
=== Club ===
Viettel F.C

- V.League 2

(silver) Runners-up : 2016

=== International ===
Vietnam U21

- International U-21 Thanh Niên Newspaper Cup

(silver) Runners-up : : 2017
