= Cosmos Dauda =

Ghanaian footballer

Personal information
- Date of birth: 31 August 1993 (age 33)
- Place of birth: Accra, Ghana
- Height: 1.87 m (6 ft 2 in)
- Position: Striker

Senior career*
| Years | Team | Apps | (Gls) |
| 2010–2014 | Tudu Mighty Jets | 22 | (12) |
| 2014–2015 | Prestige FC | 14 | (6) |
| 2016–2018 | Hearts of Oak | 32 | (18) |
| 2018–2019 | Al-Faisaly | 5 | (2) |
| 2019 | Salam Zgharta | 2 | (0) |
| 2020 | Al-Rustaq FC | 8 | (6) |
| 2020–2021 | Al-Thoqbah | 8 | (1) |
| 2021 | Al-Rustaq FC | 2 | (1) |
| 2021– | Oman Club | 0 | (0) |
- * Club domestic league appearances and goals as of 31 May 2021

Cosmos Dauda (born 31 August 1993) is a Ghanaian professional footballer who plays as a striker for Oman Club in Oman Professional League.

== Club career ==
In July 2018, Dauda signed with Al-Faisaly in Jordan on a two-year deal. In July 2019, Dauda signed with Lebanese side Salam Zgharta but due to political disturbance in the country, all foreigners had to leave Lebanon immediately. During the 2020 winter transfer window, Dauda moved to Omani team Al-Rustaq on a 5-month contract for the 2019–20 season.

On 17 October 2020, Dauda moved to Saudi Arabian side Al-Thoqbah.

On 29 January 2021, Dauda came back to Oman and signed with Al-Rustaq for remainder of the 2020–21 season of Oman.

In October 2021, Dauda signed with Oman Club for 2021–22 season.
