= Shokhruz Norkhonov =

Uzbekistani footballer

Personal information
- Full name: Shokhruz Norkhonov
- Date of birth: 13 April 1993 (age 33)
- Place of birth: Tashkent, Uzbekistan
- Height: 1.78 m (5 ft 10 in)
- Position: Forward

Senior career*
Years	Team	Apps	(Gls)
2013–2017	Obod	55	(17)
2017	Bunyodkor	10	(2)
2018–2022	Sogdiana	129	(45)
2023	Navbahor	13	(1)
2023	Bukhara	12	(2)
2024	Neftchi	18	(4)
2025	Bukhara	15	(3)

International career^{‡}
2020	Uzbekistan	2	(0)
- * Club domestic league appearances and goals as of 21 July 2025 ‡ National team caps and goals as of 17 October 2020

Shokhruz Norkhonov (Uzbek Cyrillic: Шохруз Норхонов; born 13 April 1993) is an Uzbekistani footballer who plays as a forward for Bukhara.

== Club career ==
At the end of the 2023 season, his contract with the Bukhara FC team ended and he signed a contract with the "Neftchi" club of Fergana.

== Honours ==
Sogdiana

- Uzbekistan Super League second place: 2021

Obod

- Uzbekistan Pro League winner: 2015

Bunyodkor

- Uzbekistan Cup runner-up: 2017
