= Al-Seeb Club =

Omani sports club

Al-Seeb Club نادي السيب
- Full name: Al-Seeb Club
- Nicknames: Sayyid Al-Nawadi (Master of the Clubs)
- Founded: January 3, 1972; 54 years ago
- Ground: Al-Seeb Stadium
- Capacity: 14,000
- Chairman: Shihab bin Tariq Al Said
- Head coach: Valeriu Tița
- League: Oman Professional League
- 2025–26: Oman Professional League, 1st of 12 (champions)
| Home colours | Away colours | Third colours |

Al-Seeb Club (Arabic: نادي السيب; also known as The Emperor, "Master of the Clubs", Al-Seeb or Seeb Club) is an Omani professional football club based in Al-Seeb, that competes in the Oman Professional League, the top flight of Omani football. Their home ground is Al-Seeb Stadium. In 2022, they achieved a treble, winning the Omani League, the Sultan Qaboos Cup and the AFC Cup.

== History ==
Al-Seeb Club was founded on 3 January 1972 after merging four different smaller teams (Watan, Butolah, Hilal and Fida) in Al-Seeb area. The club was officially registered on 26 June 2002.

== Honours and achievements ==
=== National titles ===
- Omani League: (5)
  - Winners: 2019–20, 2021–22, 2023–24, 2024–25, 2025–26
  - Runners-up: 1994–95
- Sultan Qaboos Cup: (4)
  - Winners: 1996, 1997, 1998, 2022
  - Runners-up: 2003, 2005, 2023, 2025
- Oman Professional League Cup: (4)
  - Winners: 2007, 2023, 2024, 2025
  - Runners-up: 2013
- Oman Super Cup: (3)
  - Winners: 2001, 2022, 2023
  - Runners-up: 1999, 2004

=== International titles ===
- AFC Cup: (1)
  - Winners: 2022

== Performance in international competitions ==
=== AFC competitions ===
- AFC Cup: 1 appearance
  - 2022 : Champions
- Asian Club Championship: 2 appearances
  - 1995 : First Round
- Asian Cup Winners' Cup: 1 appearance
  - 1997–98 : First Round
  - 1998–99 : First Round

=== UAFA competitions ===
- GCC Champions League: 1 appearance
  - 2015 : Runners-up

== Players ==
=== First team squad ===
Note: Flags indicate national team as defined under FIFA eligibility rules; some limited exceptions apply. Players may hold more than one non-FIFA nationality.

| No. | Pos. | Nation | Player |
|---|---|---|---|
| 1 | GK | OMA | Ibrahim Al-Mukhaini |
| 2 | DF | OMA | Mohamed Ramadhan |
| 4 | DF | OMA | Majid Al-Saadi |
| 5 | DF | OMA | Musab Al-Shaqsy |
| 6 | DF | OMA | Ahmed Al-Khamisi |
| 7 | MF | OMA | Zahid Al-Aghbari |
| 9 | FW | OMA | Abdul Aziz Al-Muqbali |
| 11 | FW | GAB | Axel Méyé |
| 12 | MF | OMA | Abdullah Fawaz |
| 13 | DF | OMA | Mohammed Al-Musalami |
| 14 | DF | OMA | Osama Al-Mahrooqi |
| 15 | DF | OMA | Mohammed Al-Hatmi |
| 16 | MF | OMA | Issa Al-Buraidi |

| No. | Pos. | Nation | Player |
|---|---|---|---|
| 17 | DF | OMA | Ali Al-Busaidi |
| 18 | GK | OMA | Muatasim Al-Wahaibi |
| 19 | MF | NGR | Augustine Oladapo |
| 20 | FW | OMA | Omar Al-Malki |
| 22 | DF | OMA | Hassan Al-Ajmi |
| 23 | DF | OMA | Mulham Al-Sinaidi |
| 26 | MF | OMA | Arshad Al-Alawi |
| 30 | MF | OMA | Fahad Khamis |
| 33 | MF | OMA | Abdulaziz Al-Balushi |
| 37 | FW | OMA | Mahmoun Al-Araimi |
| 42 | DF | OMA | Jawad Al-Ezzi |
| 71 | FW | OMA | Sulaiman Al-Shukaili |
| 77 | FW | OMA | Nasser Al-Rawahi |

== See also ==
- List of football clubs in Oman
