= Mohun Bagan in international football =

Mohun Bagan in International Football
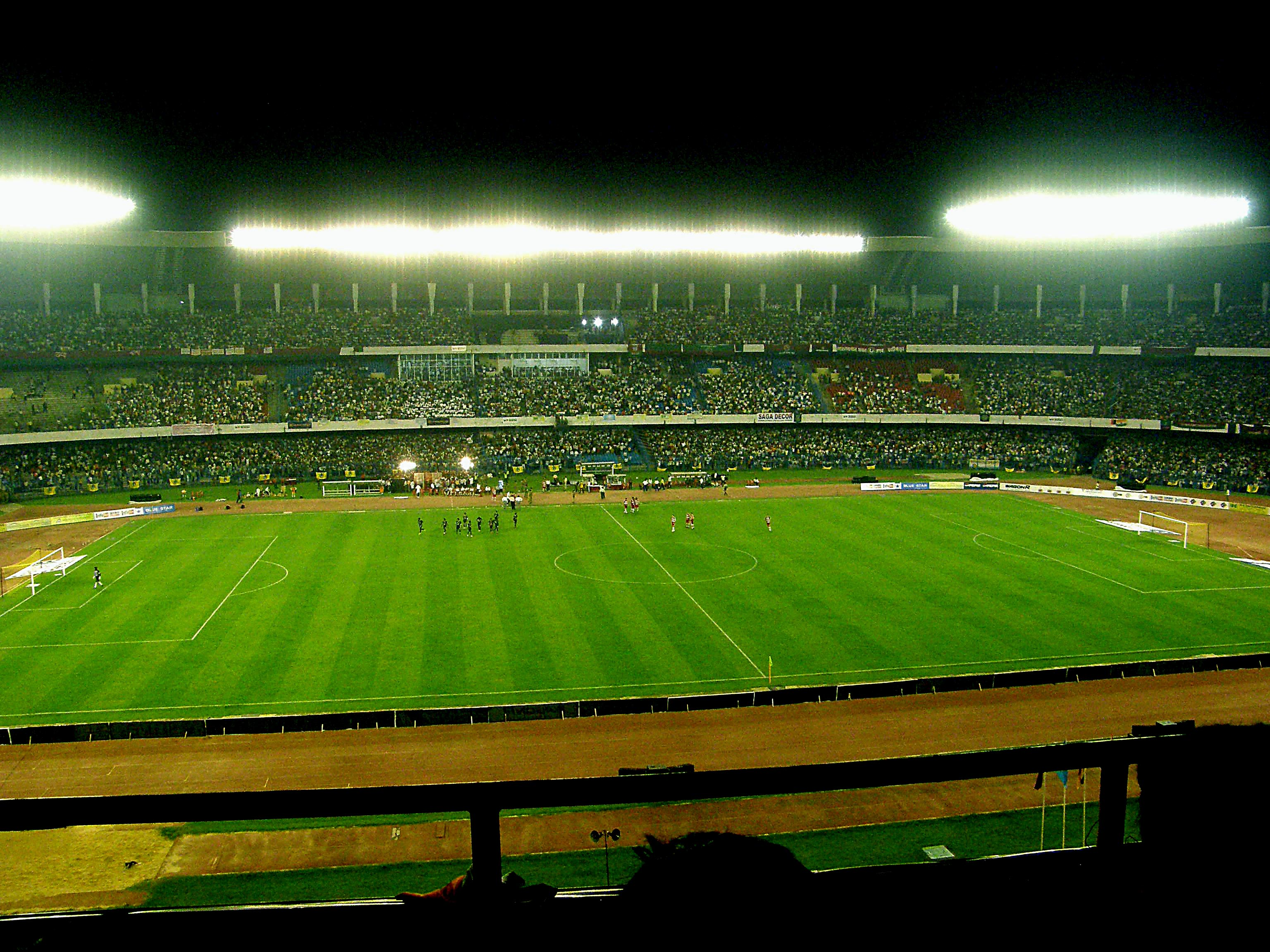
- Mohun bagan vs Bayern Munich, at the Salt Lake Stadium in Kolkata (27 May 2008).
- Club: (India) Mohun Bagan SG
- Most appearances: AFC Cup; Subhasish Bose (33)
- Top scorer: All Competitions Jeje Lalpekhlua and Sisir Ghosh (11); AFC Champions League Elite Sisir Ghosh (11); AFC Champions League Two Jeje Lalpekhlua (10)
- First entry: 1987–88
- Latest entry: 2025–26

Mohun Bagan Super Giant (commonly referred to as Mohun Bagan) is an Indian association football club based in Kolkata, West Bengal. Founded in 1889, it is one of the oldest football clubs in Asia. The club competes in the Indian Super League, the top tier of Indian football league system.

Mohun Bagan played their first match in 1889 against Eden Hindu Hostel. They won their first ever title in 1904, lifting Cooch Behar Cup. In 1911, Mohun Bagan became the first Indian club to win a major title, when they defeated the East Yorkshire Regiment, 2–1 to lift the IFA Shield. With 14 Federation Cup titles and 6 NFL/I-League/ISL titles, Mohun Bagan is the most successful club in major national tournaments. Mohun bagan have won more than 5000 matches in their football history, which is highest for an Indian club.

Till now the club has won the top-flight football league a record seven times — Indian Super League twice, I-League twice and National Football League thrice. They are one of the most successful Indian clubs in the history of the Federation Cup, having won the championship a record 14 times. The club had also won several other trophies, including the ISL playoffs (2 time), the Durand Cup (17 times), the IFA Shield (21 times), the Rovers Cup (14 times) and the Calcutta Football League (31 times).

== Major appearances ==
Competition	No. of appearances	Seasons	Best result
AFC Champions League Elite (Note: Was known as Asian Club Championship from 1985 till 2002, AFC Champions League from 2002 till 2024 is now known as the AFC Champions League Elite since 2024.)	7	1987, 1988–89, 1994–95, 1995, 1999–2000, 2002–03, 2016	Semi Final Group Stages (1988–89)
Asian Cup Winners' Cup	1	1990–91	First Round (1990–91)
AFC Champions League Two (Note: Was known as AFC Cup from 2004 till 2024 and is now known as the AFC Champions League Two since 2024.)	9	2007, 2009, 2016, 2017, 2021, 2022, 2023, 2024–25 (Note: On 7 October 2024, AFC announced that Mohun Bagan SG were considered to have withdrawn from the competition after they failed to appear for their fixture against Tractor in Tabriz. Their single match was voided.), 2025–26 (Note: On 27 September 2025, AFC announced that Mohun Bagan SG were considered to have withdrawn from the competition after they failed to appear for their fixture against Sepahan in Isfahan. Their single match was voided.)	Inter-zone play-off semi-final (2021, 2022)

== Participation record ==
AFC Tournaments
Season	Competition	Result	Ref.
1987	Asian Club Championship	Qualifying round	
1988–89	Asian Club Championship	Semi-final round	
1990–91	Asian Cup Winners' Cup	First round	
1994–95	Asian Club Championship	Second round	
1995	Asian Club Championship	First Round	
1999–00	Asian Club Championship	Second round	
2002–03	AFC Champions League	Qualifying stage	
2007	AFC Cup	Group stage	
2009	AFC Cup	Qualifying stage	
2016	AFC Champions League	Preliminary stage	
2016	AFC Cup	Round of 16	
2017	AFC Cup	Group stage	
2021	AFC Cup	Inter-zone play-offs	
2022	AFC Cup	Inter-zone play-offs	
2023–24	AFC Cup	Group stage	
2024–25	AFC Champions League Two	Withdrawn	
2025–26	AFC Champions League Two	Withdrawn	

== Statistics ==
=== Overall record in continental competitions ===
Includes records from qualifier and preliminary stage matches as well.

Competition	First match	Last match	Record							
Competition	First match	Last match	Pld	W	D	L	GF	GA	GD	Win %
AFC Champions League Elite	9 June 1987	2 February 2016	27	13	3	11	57	57	+0	48.15
Asian Cup Winners' Cup	7 December 1990	13 December 1990	2	0	0	2	0	5	−5	0.00
AFC Champions League Two	6 March 2007	16 September 2025	49	21	9	19	83	80	+3	42.86
Total			78	34	12	32	140	142	−2	43.59

Last updated: 16 September 2025
Source: Competitions

=== Top scorers ===
Rank	Pos.	Nat.	Name	ACL Elite	Asian CWC	ACL Two	Total
1	FW	(India)	Sisir Ghosh	11	-	-	11
1	FW	(India)	Jeje Lalpekhlua	10	-	1	11
3	MF	(India)	Liston Colaco	-	-	7	7
4	FW	(Haiti)	Sony Nordé	-	-	6	6
4	FW	(Australia)	David Williams	-	-	6	6
6	MF	(India)	Satyajit Chatterjee	4	-	-	4
6	FW	(India)	Tausif Jamal	4	-	-	4
6	FW	(India)	Bhaichung Bhutia	4	-	-	4
6	FW	(Brazil)	José Barreto	4	-	-	4
6	FW	(Trinidad and Tobago)	Cornell Glen	1	-	3	4
6	MF	(Finland)	Joni Kauko	-	-	4	4
6	FW	(Australia)	Jason Cummings	-	-	4	4

=== Hat tricks ===
Date	Name	Opponent	Competition	Result
2 July 1988	(India) Sisir Ghosh	(Pakistan) Crescent Textile FC	1988-89 Asian Club Championship	8–0
18 August 1994	(India) Tausif Jamal	(Sri Lanka) Ratnam SC	1994–95 Asian Club Championship	5–2
19 April 2022	(Australia) David Williams	(Bangladesh) Abahani Limited Dhaka	2022 AFC Cup	3–1
16 July 2022	(India) Liston Colaco	(Bangladesh) Bashundhara Kings	2022 AFC Cup	4–0

== AFC Champions League ==
The AFC Champions League (now known as AFC Champions League Elite) (previously known as the Asian Club Championship) is an annual continental club football competition organised by the Asian Football Confederation. Introduced in 1967 as the Asian Club Championship, the competition rebranded and took its name as AFC Champions League in 2002 as a result of the merger between the Asian Club Championship, the Asian Cup Winners' Cup and the Asian Super Cup. In 2024, the competition was rebranded and took its current name, AFC Champions League Elite. Mohun Bagan took part in the competition seven times (1987, 1988–89, 1994–95, 1995, 1999–00, 2002–03 and 2016), and went up to Semi-final round in 1988–89 with Sisir Ghosh's brilliance. Mohun Bagan's performance in 2016 AFC Champions League stands out as the only win by an Indian club in the preliminary stages.

=== 1987 Asian Club Championship ===
==== 1987 Asian Club Championship ====
Pos	Team	Pld	W	D	L	GF	GA	GD	Pts	Qualification
1	(Iraq) Al Rasheed	4	4	0	0	23	2	+21	8	Advance to Group stage
2	(India) Mohun Bagan	4	2	1	1	12	6	+6	5	
3	(Bangladesh) Dhaka Mohammedan (H)	4	2	1	1	12	10	+2	5	
4	(Nepal) Manang Marsyangdi	4	1	0	3	8	19	−11	2	
5	Pakistan Air Force	4	0	0	4	3	21	−18	0	

Source: RSSSF
(H) Hosts

Mohun Bagan qualified for the qualifying stages of the 1987 Asian Club Championship after winning the 1986 Federation Cup. The Green and Maroon brigade became the second Indian "club" to qualify for the Asian Club Championship. Mohun Bagan made their Asian Club Championship debut in 1987 when they took part in the qualifying stages of the Asian Club Championship. The Mariners were clubbed in Group 2 alongside Al Rasheed (Iraq), Mohammedan SC (Bangladesh), Manang Marsyangdi (Nepal) and PAF FC (Pakistan). On 9 June 1987, the Mariners started their Asian Club Championship journey against Pakistan Air Force FC in Dhaka where they crushed the former 4–0 with Sisir Ghosh's brace. On 12 June 1987, Al-Rasheed SC defeated Mohun Bagan 2-0 but the very next day Bagan held Mohammedan SC (Dhaka) 2–2 after Sisir Ghosh scored another brace in the tournament. On 16 June 1987, Mohun Bagan defeated Manang Marsyangdi 6-1 marking it as one of their biggest wins in AFC competitions. Sisir Ghosh established his name is Asia as he went on scoring 6 goals in the tournament. However, the Indian club was ousted from the group stage after finishing second as only the Group Topper would qualify for the Group Stage.

===== Matches =====
Win Draw Loss

9 June 1987 Group stage	Mohun Bagan (India)	4–0	(Pakistan) PAF	Dhaka, Bangladesh
	Satyajit Chatterjee; Sisir Ghosh; Prasanta Banerjee			Stadium: Mirpur Stadium

12 June 1987 Group stage	Mohun Bagan (India)	0–2	(Iraq) Al-Rasheed	Dhaka, Bangladesh
			Sossein; Shakir	Stadium: Mirpur Stadium

13 June 1987 Group stage	Mohun Bagan (India)	2–2	(Bangladesh) Dhaka Mohammedan	Dhaka, Bangladesh
	Sisir Ghosh		Barhanzadeh; Emeka Ezeugo	Stadium: Mirpur Stadium

16 June 1987 Group stage	Mohun Bagan (India)	6–1	(Nepal) Manang Marshyangdi	Dhaka, Bangladesh
	Amalraj; Satyajit Chatterjee; Uttam Mukherjee; Sisir Ghosh		Ganesh Thapa	Stadium: Mirpur Stadium

=== 1988–89 Asian Club Championship ===
==== 1988–89 Asian Club Championship Group Stage ====
Pos	Team	Pld	W	D	L	GF	GA	GD	Pts	Qualification
1	(India) Mohun Bagan (H)	3	3	0	0	13	2	+11	6	Qualify to Semi-finals
2	(Oman) Fanja	3	2	0	1	13	3	+10	4	
3	(Pakistan) Crescent Textile Mills	3	1	0	2	3	17	−14	2	
4	(Nepal) Kathmandu SC	3	0	0	3	4	11	−7	0	

Source: RSSSF
(H) Hosts

==== 1988–89 Asian Club Championship Semifinal Group Round ====
Pos	Team	Pld	W	D	L	GF	GA	GD	Pts	Qualification
1	(Iraq) Al-Rasheed	3	2	1	0	7	1	+6	5	Advance to Final
2	(China) Guangdong Wanbao (H)	3	1	2	0	8	2	+6	4	
3	(Kuwait) Kazma SC	3	1	1	1	2	3	−1	3	
4	(India) Mohun Bagan	3	0	0	3	0	11	−11	0	

Source: RSSSF
(H) Hosts

Mohun Bagan took part in the 1988–89 Asian Club Championship after winning the 1987 Federation Cup and displayed outstanding performance in the group stage. The 1988-89 Asian Club Championship arguably saw one of the best performances by Mohun Bagan on the continental level, as the Mariners managed to make it to the Semi-final group. The points system in Asian Club Championship was a bit different. Back then, two points were awarded for a win and one for a draw. Bagan were drawn in Group 3 of the group stage round, alongside Crescent Textiles (Pakistan), Kathmandu SC (Nepal), and Fanja SC (Oman) hosted in Salt Lake Stadium. They started their journey on 2 July 1988, with a thrilling note by defeating Crescent Textiles of Pakistan 8–0 with a hattrick from Sisir Ghosh. This is recorded as the biggest win for Mohun Bagan in AFC Competitions. On 5 July 1988, Bagan went on defeating Kathmandu SC of Nepal 4–2 with another brace from Sisir Ghosh. The Green and Maroon Brigade defeated the mighty Fanja SC of Oman on 9 July 1988. They finished First in their group and qualified for Semi-final round Group Stages. In the semifinal group round, they were clubbed with Al-Rasheed SC (Iraq), Guangdong Wanbao (China) and Kazma SC (Kuwait). The Indian club lost all three matches and were ousted from the competition.

===== Matches =====
Win Draw Loss

2 July 1988 Group stage	Mohun Bagan (India)	8–0	(Pakistan) Crescent Textile	Kolkata, India
	Satyajit Chatterjee; Aloke Mukherjee; Babu Mani; Prasanta Banerjee; Sisir Ghosh			Stadium: Salt Lake Stadium

5 July 1988 Group stage	Mohun Bagan (India)	4–2	(Nepal) Kathmandu	Kolkata, India
	Sisir Ghosh; Babu Mani; Prasanta Banerjee		Ganesh Thapa	Stadium: Salt Lake Stadium

9 July 1988 Group stage	Mohun Bagan (India)	1–0	(Oman) Fanja	Kolkata, India
	Sudip Chatterjee			Stadium: Salt Lake Stadium

9 June 1988 Semi Final Group round	Kazma (Kuwait)	1–0	(India) Mohun Bagan	Guangzhou, China
	Yusuf (pen.)

11 June 1988 Semi Final Group round	Guangdong Wanbao (China)	6–0	(India) Mohun Bagan	Guangzhou, China
	Aloke Mukherjee (o.g.); Liao Yu; Gie Yu Jin; Liao Yu

13 June 1988 Semi Final Group round	Al-Rasheed (Iraq)	4–0	(India) Mohun Bagan	Guangzhou, China
	Amishaki; G.Akal; Scheherar; Amis

=== 1994–95 Asian Club Championship ===
==== 1994-95 Asian Club Championship Group Stage ====
Team	Pld	W	D	L	GF	GA	GD	Pts	Qualification
(India) Mohun Bagan (H)	2	2	0	0	12	2	+10	6	Advance to First Round
(Maldives) Club Valencia	2	1	0	1	3	8	−5	3	
(Sri Lanka) Ratnam SC	2	0	0	2	2	7	−5	0	

(H) Hosts

Pakistan did not send a team.

Mohun Bagan took part in the 1994-95 Asian Club Championship after winning the 1993 Federation Cup. Mariners under Coach Shanker Banerjee continued the good form in 1994-95 Asian Club Championship when they emerged top of the South Asia Group to enter the Second Round East Asia Playoffs. Mohun Bagan defeated Club Valencia and Ratnam SC in the preliminary stage, but ended their journey after a 4–0 away loss to Thai Farmers Bank F.C. in the 1st leg of the second round.

Due to a plague threat in India, AFC ordered that the return leg will be played in Malaysia. Bagan management objected to the decision but the apex governing body in Asia was not convinced. Instead, the Indian club was ejected from the competition, fined $3000 and banned from AFC competitions for three years. The ban was later removed.

===== Matches =====
Win Draw Loss

14 August 1994 Preliminary Group Stage	Mohun Bagan (India)	7–1	(Maldives) Club Valencia	Kolkata, India
	Jo Paul Ancheri; Christopher; Gautam Ghosh; I. M. Vijayan; Tausif Jamal		Abdul Latif	Stadium: Salt Lake Stadium

18 August 1994 Preliminary Group Stage	Mohun Bagan (India)	5–2	(Maldives) Club Valencia	Kolkata, India
	Jo Paul Ancheri; Tausif Jamal		no information	Stadium: Salt Lake Stadium

3 September 1994 Second round	Thai Farmers Bank (Thailand)	4–0	(India) Mohun Bagan	Bangkok, Thailand
	no information			Stadium: Kasikorn Bank Stadium

Not Played Second round	Mohun Bagan (India)	0–3 (0–7 agg.)	(Thailand) Thai Farmers Bank

=== 1995 Asian Club Championship ===
Mohun Bagan took part in the 1995 Asian Club Championship after winning the 1994 Federation Cup and was drawn against Maldivian side Club Valencia in the first round. On 16 September 1995, in the first leg, Mohun Bagan won 2-1 but in the return leg on 29 September 1995, Bagan went down narrowly by a goal away from home. Club Valencia progressed taking advantage of an away goal.

==== Matches ====
Win Draw Loss

16 September 1995 First round	Mohun Bagan (India)	2–1	(Maldives) Club Valencia	Kolkata, India
	Satyabrata Bhowmik; Monoharan		Lawrence Tony Okofor	Stadium: Salt Lake Stadium

29 September 1995 First round	Club Valencia (Maldives)	1–0 (2–2 agg.)	(India) Mohun Bagan	Malé, Maldives
	Moosa Manik			Stadium: Rasmee Dhandu Stadium

=== 1999–2000 Asian Club Championship ===
Mohun Bagan registered their fifth appearance in Asia after winning the National Football League (NFL) under the guidance of Subrata Bhattacharya. On 21 August 1999, Mohun Bagan started their journey on a winning note by defeating the Bangladeshi side, Muktijoddha Sangsad KC at Salt Lake Stadium. In the return leg on 11 September 1999, Bagan held 0–0 draw against the Bangladeshi side and qualified to the second round of 1999–2000 Asian Club Championship. On 9 October 1999, Mohun Bagan travelled to Iwata, Japan for the first leg of the Second round and suffered a 8–0 loss against the Japanese side Júbilo Iwata, their heaviest defeat in continental competitions to this date. The second leg was supposed to happen on 16 October 1999 on the auspicious occasion of Durga Puja. Bagan management failed to convince the police to organize the match and herby upon mutual agreement, the return leg was not played. Júbilo Iwata.

==== Matches ====
Win Draw Loss

21 August 1999 First round	Muktijoddha Sangsad (Bangladesh)	1–2	(India) Mohun Bagan	Dhaka, Bangladesh
	Bakhtiar		Chima Okorie; Dipendu Biswas	Stadium: Bangabandhu National Stadium

11 September 1999 First round	Mohun Bagan (India)	0–0 (2–1 agg.)	(Bangladesh) Muktijoddha Sangsad	Kolkata, India
				Stadium: Salt Lake Stadium

9 October 1999 Second round	Júbilo Iwata (Japan)	8–0 (0–8 agg.)	(India) Mohun Bagan	Iwata, Japan
	no information			Stadium: Yamaha Stadium

=== 2002–03 AFC Champions League ===
Mohun Bagan became the first Indian Club alongside Churchill Brothers to feature in the AFC Champions League. Mohun Bagan qualified for 2002–03 AFC Champions League after winning the 2001–02 National Football League. The team traveled to Colombo, Sri Lanka to face the Sri Lankan side, Saunders SC in the Qualifying Zone 2, Round 2 of the 2002–03 AFC Champions League. On 11 September 2002, Mohun Bagan defeated Saunders SC 2–0 away from home. In the return leg on 22 September 2002, Mohun Bagan once again defeated Saunders SC 5–1 at home with Bhaichung Bhutia scoring a brace and qualified for the Qualifying Zone 2, Round 3 where they were drawn against the Maldivian side, Club Valencia. On 9 October 2002, Mohun Bagan faced Club Valencia at home where they held 2–2 draw. Sunil Chettri and José Barreto scored for Bagan. In the return leg on 22 October 2002, Mohun Bagan squad travelled to Malé, Maldives to face Club Valencia where they defeated the former 3-0 and qualified for Qualifying Zone 2, Round 4 of the 2002–03 AFC Champions League. The team travelled to South Korea to face the South Korean giants, Daejeon Citizen. On 13 November 2002, Mohun Bagan suffered a 6–0 loss against Daejeon Citizen which is also considered as one of their heaviest defeat in continental competitions. In the return leg on 16 November 2002, Daejeon Citizen defeated Mohun Bagan 2–1 with José Barreto scoring the only goal for Mohun Bagan.

==== Matches ====
Win Draw Loss

11 September 2002 Qualifying Zone 2, Round 2	Saunders (Sri Lanka)	0–2	(India) Mohun Bagan	Colombo, Sri Lanka
			Bhaichung Bhutia; George Ekeh	Stadium: Sugathadasa Stadium

22 September 2002 Qualifying Zone 2, Round 2	Mohun Bagan (India)	5–1 (7-1 agg.)	(Sri Lanka) Saunders	Kolkata, India
	Bhaichung Bhutia; José Barreto; George Ekeh; Jayanta Sen		no information	Stadium: Salt Lake Stadium

9 October 2002 Qualifying Zone 2, Round 3	Mohun Bagan (India)	2–2	(Maldives) Club Valencia	Kolkata, India
	Sunil Chettri; José Barreto		Nazim; Asfag	Stadium: Salt Lake Stadium

22 October 2002 Qualifying Zone 2, Round 3	Club Valencia (Maldives)	0–3 (2–5 agg.)	(India) Mohun Bagan	Malé, Maldives
			Bhaichung Bhutia; José Barreto; George Ekeh	Stadium: Rasmee Dhandu Stadium

13 November 2002 Qualifying Zone 2, Round 4	Daejeon Citizen (South Korea)	6–0	(India) Mohun Bagan	Daejeon, South Korea
	Kim Yung-Kwon; Lee Kwao (pen.); O Kyung; Kim Kwang; Kim Fan-jong			Stadium: Daejeon World Cup Stadium

16 November 2002 Qualifying Zone 2, Round 4	Mohun Bagan (India)	1–2 (1-8 agg.)	(South Korea) Daejeon Citizen	Kolkata, India
	José Barreto		Lee Chang; Gang	Stadium: Salt Lake Stadium

=== 2016 AFC Champions League ===
Mohun Bagan qualified for preliminary rounds of the 2016 AFC Champions League after winning the 2014–15 I-League under the guidance of Sanjoy Sen. On 27 January 2016, Mohun Bagan made history by becoming the first Indian club to win a match in AFC Champions League and the only Indian Club to win the preliminary stages of 2016 AFC Champions League qualifying play-off where they defeated the Singaporean side, Tampines Rovers FC 3–1 at Salt Lake Stadium and qualified for the second preliminary round of ACL qualifying play-offs. Mohun Bagan drew the Chinese giants Shandong Luneng in the second preliminary round. The team travelled to Jinan, Shandong where they suffered a 6–0 loss on 2 February 2016 and were eventually placed in the 2016 AFC Cup.

==== Matches ====
Win Draw Loss

27 January 2016 Preliminary Round 1	Mohun Bagan (India)	3–1	(Singapore) Tampines Rovers	Kolkata, India
19:00 IST	Jeje 6'; Glen 42'; Katsumi 84'; Pronay (yellow card) 31'; Kingshuk (yellow card) 43'; Debjit (yellow card) 85'; A.Das (yellow card) 90+2'	Report	Hanapi 44'; K.Jun (yellow card) 20'; N.Rahman (yellow card) 32'	Stadium: Salt Lake Stadium; Attendance: 12,640; Referee: Jarred Gillett (Australia)

2 February 2016 Preliminary Round 2	Shandong Luneng (China)	6–0	(India) Mohun Bagan	Jinan, China
15:00 CST	Montillo 23'; Tardelli 40'; Yang 55', 68'; Zheng 76'; Wang 88'	Report		Stadium: Jinan Olympic Sports Center Stadium; Attendance: 15,109; Referee: Mohanad Qasim Eesee Sarray (Iraq)

== Asian Cup Winners' Cup ==
The Asian Cup Winners' Cup was an Asian football club competition contested annually by the winners of domestic cup competitions. The cup was, chronologically, the second seasonal inter-Asian club competition organized by Asian Football Confederation (AFC). The competition was started in 1990 as a tournament for all the domestic cup winners from countries affiliated to the AFC. In India, the winners of the Durand Cup used to participate in the tournament. Mohun Bagan took part in the Asian Cup Winners' Cup one time in 1990–91.

=== 1990–91 Asian Cup Winners' Cup ===
Mohun Bagan qualified for the 1990–91 Asian Cup Winners' Cup as they were Runners' up the 1989 Durand Cup. Mohun Bagan were drawn against Dalian Shide F.C. of China in the first round of the tournament. In the first-leg on 7 December 1990, away at the Dalian People's Stadium, Mohun Bagan suffered a 1–0 loss against the Chinese side, Dalian Shide F.C. In the return leg on 13 December 1990, Dalian Shide F.C. defeated Mohun Bagan 4–0 at their home and was eliminated from the tournament.

==== Matches ====
Win Draw Loss

7 December 1990 First Round	Dalian Shide (China)	1–0	Mohun Bagan (India)	Dalian, China
	Way Emin			Stadium: Dalian People's Stadium

13 December 1990 First Round	Mohun Bagan (India)	0–4 (0–5 agg.)	(China) Dalian Shide	Kolkata, India
			Wang Tao; Joe Ho; Liming	Stadium: Salt Lake Stadium

== AFC Champions League Two ==
The AFC Champions League Two (previously known as the AFC Cup, abbreviated as the ACL Two) is an annual continental club football competition organised by the Asian Football Confederation. It is the second-tier competition of Asian club football, ranked below the AFC Champions League Elite and above the AFC Challenge League. In India, the winners of the Federation Cup and the I-League received direct entries into the tournament. Since the Federation Cup was abolished in 2017, the slot was given to the play-off winners of the Indian Super League. Mohun Bagan has participated eight times in the tournament, reaching the inter-zone play-offs twice in 2021 and in 2022 including a Round of 16 appearance in 2016.

=== 2007 AFC Cup ===
Mohun Bagan qualified for the 2007 AFC Cup after winning the 2006 Federation Cup and were placed in Group F alongside Tampines Rovers FC of Singapore, Osotspa F.C of Thailand and Pahang FC of Malaysia. The Green and Maroon army held 0–0 draw in their first game against Tampines Rovers FC at the Salt Lake Stadium. In their next match, Mohun Bagan defeated Pahang FC by 2–0 in Darul Makmur Stadium with Bhaichung Bhutia and Lalawmpuia Pachuau scoring for Mohun Bagan. In the following match Mohun Bagan held 0–0 draw against Osotspa F.C at Royal Thai Army Stadium but defeated them 1–0 with José Barreto's goal at the Salt Lake Stadium. Mohun Bagan however, could not defeat Tampines Rovers FC at the Tampines Stadium as they suffered a 2–0 loss. Mohun Bagan managed to win their last match against Pahang FC at the Salt Lake Stadium but were eliminated from the tournament as they finished second with 3 wins and 2 draw.

==== Group stage ====
Pos	Team	Pld	W	D	L	GF	GA	GD	Pts	Qualification
1	(Singapore) Tampines Rovers	6	4	1	1	10	5	+5	13	Advance to Knockout stage
2	(India) Mohun Bagan	6	3	2	1	5	3	+2	11	
3	(Thailand) Osotsapa	6	3	1	2	12	3	+9	10	
4	(Malaysia) Pahang	6	0	0	6	2	18	−16	0	

===== Matches =====
Win Draw Loss

6 March 2007 Group Stage	Mohun Bagan (India)	0–0	(Singapore) Tampines Rovers	Kolkata, India
		(Report)		Stadium: Salt Lake Stadium; Attendance: 20,000; Referee: (Vietnam) Vo Minh Tri

20 March 2007 Group Stage	Pahang FC (Malaysia)	1–2	(India) Mohun Bagan	Kuantan, Malaysia
	Tarik El Janaby 61'	(Report)	Lalawmpuia Pachuau 30'; Baichung Bhutia 74'	Stadium: Darulmakmur Stadium; Attendance: 1,000; Referee: (Iraq) Kadhum Auda Lazim

20 March 2007 Group Stage	Osotspa F.C (Thailand)	0–0	(India) Mohun Bagan	Bangkok, Thailand
		(Report)		Stadium: Royal Thai Army Stadium; Attendance: 2,000; Referee: (China) Yang Zhiqiang

24 April 2007 Group Stage	Mohun Bagan (India)	1–0	(Thailand) Osotspa F.C	Kolkata, India
	José Ramírez Barreto 43'	(Report)		Stadium: Salt Lake Stadium; Attendance: 18,000; Referee: (South Korea) Kwon Jong-Chul

8 May 2007 Group Stage	Tampines Rovers (Singapore)	2–0	(India) Mohun Bagan	Bangkok, Thailand
	Mohd Noh Alam Shah 34' 66'	(Report)		Stadium: Royal Thai Army Stadium; Attendance: 2,000; Referee: (China) Yang Zhiqiang

22 May 2007 Group Stage	Mohun Bagan (India)	2–0	(Malaysia) Pahang FC	Kolkata, India
	Lal Kamal Bhowmick 12'; Lalawmpuia Pachuau 69'	(Report)		Stadium: Salt Lake Stadium; Attendance: 15,000; Referee: (Tajikistan) Dilovar Orzuev

=== 2009 AFC Cup ===
Mohun Bagan qualified for the 2009 AFC Cup after winning the 2008 Federation Cup and were placed in Group D alongside Al-Kuwait of Kuwait, Al-Karamah of Syria and Al-Wehdat of Jordan. Mohun Bagan however, could not win any of the matches in the group stage as they finished last without any points and were eliminated.

==== Group stage ====
Team	Pld	W	D	L	GF	GA	GD	Pts	KUW	KAR	WAH	MOH
Al-Kuwait	6	4	1	1	12	4	+8	13		2–1	1–0	6–0
(Syria) Al-Karamah	6	4	0	2	12	7	+5	12	2–1		3–1	1–0
(Jordan) Al-Wahdat	6	3	1	2	12	7	+5	10	1–1	3–1		5–0
(India) Mohun Bagan	6	0	0	6	1	19	−18	0	0–1	0–4	1–2	

Legend: Blue = home team win; Yellow = draw; Red = away team win.

===== Matches =====
Win Draw Loss

10 March 2009 Group Stage	Al-Karamah (Syria)	1–0	(India) Mohun Bagan	Homs, Syria
	M. Al Hamawi 60'	(Report) (Summary)		Stadium: Khaled bin Walid Stadium; Attendance: 17,000; Referee: (Turkmenistan) Çarymyrat Gurbanow

17 March 2009 Group Stage	Mohun Bagan (India)	1–2	(Jordan) Al-Wahdat	Kolkata, India
	Rakesh Masih 13'	(Report) (Summary)	Mahmoud Shelbaieh 16'; Hassan Abdel Fattah 43'	Stadium: Salt Lake Stadium; Attendance: 10,000; Referee: (Malaysia) Wahab Abdul

7 April 2009 Group Stage	Mohun Bagan (India)	0–1	Al-Kuwait	Howrah, India
		(Report) (Summary)	Samer Al Martah 60'	Stadium: Howrah M.C.Stadium; Attendance: 8,000; Referee: (Hong Kong) Ng Chiu Kok

21 April 2009 Group Stage	Al-Kuwait	6–0	(India) Mohun Bagan	Kuwait City, Kuwait
	J. Al Hussain 9' (pen.), 21', 72'; Faraj Laheeb 34', 39'; Jarah Al Ataiqi 78'	(Report) (Summary)		Stadium: Al Kuwait SC Stadium; Attendance: 3,000; Referee: (Uzbekistan) Vladislav Tseytlin

5 May 2009 Group Stage	Al-Wahdat (Jordan)	5–0	(India) Mohun Bagan	Amman, Jordan
	Manju 27' (o.g.); Issa Al-Sabah 29', 40'; Hassan Abdel Fattah 67' (pen.); Ra'fat Ali 85'	(Report) (Summary)		Stadium: King Abdullah Stadium; Attendance: 4,000; Referee: (Lebanon) Mohammad Mansour

7 April 2009 Group Stage	Mohun Bagan (India)	0–4	(Syria) Al-Karamah	Howrah, India
		(Report) (Summary)	H. Al Taiar 17', 72'; A. Al Shbli 39'; M. Al Hamawi 60'	Stadium: Howrah M.C.Stadium; Attendance: 3,200; Referee: (Sri Lanka) Hettikamkanamge Perera

=== 2016 AFC Cup ===
Mohun Bagan qualified for the 2016 AFC Cup after getting eliminated from 2016 AFC Champions League. They were drawn in Group G alongside South China of Hong Kong, Yangon United of Myanmar and Maziya of Maldives. Mohun Bagan began their campaign on a terrific note as they won all of their first three matches in the group stages and confirmed their place in Round of 16. In this tie, they faced the Singaporean side Tampines Rovers where they suffered a 2–1 loss at Indira Gandhi Athletic Stadium and were eliminated from the tournament.

==== Group stage ====
Pos	Team	Pld	W	D	L	GF	GA	GD	Pts	Qualification	MOH	SCA	YAN	MAZ
1	(India) Mohun Bagan	6	3	2	1	14	9	+5	11	Knockout stage	—	0–3	3–2	5–2
2	(Hong Kong) South China	6	3	0	3	9	9	0	9	Knockout stage	0–4	—	2–1	2–0
3	(Myanmar) Yangon United	6	2	2	2	10	10	0	8		1–1	2–1	—	3–2
4	(Maldives) Maziya	6	1	2	3	8	13	−5	5		1–1	2–1	1–1	—

Source: AFC
Rules for classification: Group stage tiebreakers

==== Bracket ====
Round of 16	Quarter-finals
(Iraq) Al-Quwa Al-Jawiya	2
(Jordan) Al-Wehdat	1
(Iraq) Al-Quwa Al-Jawiya	1	4	5
(Syria) Al-Jaish	1	0	1
(Iraq) Naft Al-Wasat	0
(Syria) Al-Jaish	1
West Zone
(Lebanon) Al-Ahed	4
(Syria) Al-Wahda	0
(Lebanon) Al-Ahed	1	2	3
(Bahrain) Al-Muharraq	0	0	0
(Bahrain) Al-Muharraq	1
(Jordan) Al-Faisaly	0
(Philippines) Ceres	0
(Hong Kong) South China (a.e.t.)	1
(Hong Kong) South China	1	1	2
(Malaysia) Johor Darul Ta'zim	1	2	3
(Malaysia) Johor Darul Ta'zim	7
(Philippines) Kaya	2
East Zone
(Hong Kong) Kitchee	2
(India) Bengaluru	3
(India) Bengaluru	1	0	1
(Singapore) Tampines Rovers	0	0	0
(India) Mohun Bagan	1
(Singapore) Tampines Rovers (a.e.t.)	2

Semi-finals
(Iraq) Al-Quwa Al-Jawiya	1	3	4
(Lebanon) Al-Ahed	1	2	3
(Malaysia) Johor Darul Ta'zim	1	1	2
(India) Bengaluru	1	3	4

Final
(Iraq) Al-Quwa Al-Jawiya	1
(India) Bengaluru	0

===== Matches =====
Win Draw Loss

24 February 2016 Group Stage	Mohun Bagan (India)	5–2	(Maldives) Maziya	Guwahati
19:00 IST	Norde 19'; Jeje 33', 69'; Glen 35', 72'; B.Singh (yellow card) 85'; Luciano (yellow card) 90+3'	Report	Imaaz 61'; Raju 77' (o.g.); Easa (yellow card) 4'; Mohamed (yellow card) 18'; Nashid (yellow card) 87'	Stadium: Indira Gandhi Athletic Stadium; Attendance: 5,322; Referee: Jumpei Iida (Japan)

9 March 2016 Group Stage	South China (Hong Kong)	0–4	(India) Mohun Bagan	Hong Kong
20:00 HKT	Hok Hei (yellow card) 11'; Runqiu (yellow card) 13' (yellow-red card) 16'	Report	Rodrigues 15'; Norde 39'; Glen 44'; Jeje 83'; S.Ghosh (yellow card) 84'	Stadium: Mong Kok Stadium; Attendance: 1,937; Referee: Masoud Tufayelieh (Syria)

16 March 2016 Group Stage	Mohun Bagan (India)	3–2	(Myanmar) Yangon United	Guwahati
19:00 IST	Norde 10'; Jeje 21', 66'; Pronay (yellow card) 74'	Report	Marcelo 34' (pen.), 64'; Lin (yellow card) 75'; Paing (yellow card) 89'	Stadium: Indira Gandhi Athletic Stadium; Attendance: 2,748; Referee: Khamis Al-Kuwari (Qatar)

13 April 2016 Group Stage	Yangon United (Myanmar)	1–1	(India) Mohun Bagan	Yangon
16:00 MMT	Adilson 26'; Lwin (yellow card) 83'	Report	Glen 42'; Raju (yellow card) 29'; Jeje (yellow card) 52'; Luciano (yellow card) 60'	Stadium: Thuwunna Stadium; Attendance: 590; Referee: Yu Ming-hsun (Chinese Taipei)

27 April 2016 Group Stage	Maziya (Maldives)	1–1	(India) Mohun Bagan	Malé
16:00 MVT	Abdulla 65'; Dinev (yellow card) 7'; Habeeb (yellow card) 59'	Report	Jeje 90+3'; Balmuchu (yellow card) 16'; B.Singh (yellow card) 21'; Glen (yellow card) 73'	Stadium: National Football Stadium; Attendance: 400; Referee: Wang Di (China)

11 May 2016 Group Stage	Mohun Bagan (India)	0–3	(Hong Kong) South China	Guwahati
18:30 IST	S.Ghosh (yellow card) 27'	Report	Chung 19'; Griffiths 24'; Mahama 33'	Stadium: Indira Gandhi Athletic Stadium; Attendance: 472; Referee: Yaqoob Abdul Baki (Oman)

24 May 2016 Round of 16	Mohun Bagan (India)	1–2 (a.e.t.)	(Singapore) Tampines Rovers	Guwahati
19:00 IST	B.Singh 72'; Raju (yellow card) 54'; Arnab (yellow card) 114'; D.Singh (yellow card) 117'	Report	Webb 63'; Yunos 116'; Hamzah (yellow card) 51' (yellow-red card) 54'; Mukhtar (yellow card) 79'; Pennant (yellow card) 79'; Sujad (yellow card) 108'	Stadium: Indira Gandhi Athletic Stadium; Attendance: 282; Referee: Turki Al-Khudhayr (Saudi Arabia)

=== 2017 AFC Cup ===
Mohun Bagan qualified for the qualifying play-offs 2017 AFC Cup after winning the 2015-16 Federation Cup. In the Preliminary round, Mohun Bagan faced Colombo FC of Sri Lanka where they defeated them 2–1 at Colombo Racecourse away from home. In the return leg, Mohun Bagan once again defeated Colombo FC 2–1 at home and qualified for the Play-off round where they faced the Maldivian club, Club Valencia. In the first leg, Mohun Bagan travelled to Malé where they held 1–1 draw against the former. In the return fixture, Mohun Bagan defeated Club Valencia in the Rabindra Sarobar Stadium and qualified for the AFC Cup group stage. They were placed in Group E alongside Bengaluru FC of India, Maziya S&RC of Maldives and Abahani Limited Dhaka of Bangladesh. In the opening game, at Bengaluru, Mohun Bagan suffered a 2–1 loss against Bengaluru FC. They managed to win their next game at home against Abahani Limited Dhaka of Bangladesh. Mohun Bagan lost their next two matches where suffered a 1–0 defeat at home and 5–2 defeat away from home against Maziya S&RC of Maldives. Mohun Bagan ended their AFC Cup campaign with a win against Bengaluru FC at home and 1–1 draw against Abahani Limited Dhaka away from home. With two wins, one draw and 3 losses, Mohun Bagan finished third in the group with seven points and was eliminated from the tournament.

==== Preliminary round ====
31 January 2017 Leg 1	Colombo (Sri Lanka)	1–2	(India) Mohun Bagan	Colombo
15:30 SLST	Olofin 30'; Meera (yellow card) 32'; Jean Yapo (yellow card) 57'; Mohamed (yellow card) 90'	Report	Kean 13'; Sehnaj 70'; Bikramjeet (yellow card) 68'	Stadium: Race Course Ground; Attendance: 3,800; Referee: Yu Ming Hsun (Chinese Taipei)

7 February 2017 Leg 2	Mohun Bagan (India)	2–1 (4–2 agg.)	(Sri Lanka) Colombo	Kolkata
19:00 IST	Norde 28'; Duffy 56'	Report	Jean Yapo 88'	Stadium: Rabindra Sarobar Stadium; Attendance: 3,156; Referee: Ahmed Al-Ali (Jordan)

==== Play-off round ====
21 February 2017 Leg 1	Club Valencia (Maldives)	1–1	(India) Mohun Bagan	Malé
16:00 MVT	Omodu 71' (pen.); Saleem (yellow card) 33'; Visam (yellow card) 90+1'	Report	Duffy 6'	Stadium: National Football Stadium; Attendance: 850; Referee: Aziz Asimov (Uzbekistan)

28 February 2017 Leg 2	Mohun Bagan (India)	4–1 (5–2 agg.)	(Maldives) Club Valencia	Kolkata
16:00 IST	Jeje 2' (pen.), 81'; Nihan 45' (o.g.); Norde 87'; Anas (yellow card) 90+1'	Report	Omodu 52'	Stadium: Rabindra Sarobar Stadium; Attendance: 4,250; Referee: Võ Minh Trí (Vietnam)

==== Group stage ====
Pos	Team	Pld	W	D	L	GF	GA	GD	Pts	Qualification	BFC	MAZ	MOH	ABD
1	(India) Bengaluru	6	4	0	2	7	6	+1	12 (Note: Head-to-head results: Maziya 0–1 Bengaluru, Bengaluru 1–0 Maziya.)	Inter-zone play-off semi-finals	—	1–0	2–1	2–0
2	(Maldives) Maziya	6	4	0	2	10	4	+6	12		0–1	—	5–2	2–0
3	(India) Mohun Bagan	6	2	1	3	10	11	−1	7		3–1	0–1	—	3–1
4	(Bangladesh) Abahani Limited Dhaka	6	1	1	4	4	10	−6	4		2–0	0–2	1–1	—

Source: AFC

===== Matches =====
Win Draw Loss

14 March 2017	Bengaluru FC (India)	2–1	(India) Mohun Bagan	Bengaluru
19:00 IST	Jhingan 51' (yellow card) 36'; Chhetri 57'; Watson (yellow card) 58'; John Johnson (yellow card) 69'; Khabra (yellow card) 90+3'	Report	Katsumi 36' (pen.); Norde (yellow card) 74'	Stadium: Sree Kanteerava Stadium; Attendance: 3,692; Referee: Shukri Al-Hunfush (Saudi Arabia)

4 April 2017	Mohun Bagan (India)	3–1	(Bangladesh) Dhaka Abahani	Kolkata
19:00 IST	Jeje 45+1'; Balwant 48'; Norde 87'	Report	Brown 21'; Hasan (yellow card) 15'; Yeasin (yellow card) 89'	Stadium: Rabindra Sarobar Stadium; Attendance: 2,128; Referee: Mohammad Abu Loum (Jordan)

18 April 2017	Mohun Bagan (India)	0–1	(Maldives) Maziya	Kolkata
19:00 IST	Bikramjit (yellow card) 55'	Report	Umair 34'; Kovačević (yellow card) 83' (yellow-red card) 85'	Stadium: Rabindra Sarobar Stadium; Attendance: 1,842; Referee: Võ Minh Trí (Vietnam)

3 May 2017	Maziya (Maldives)	5–2	(India) Mohun Bagan	Malé
16:00 MVT	Habeeb 13'; Umair 27'; Rakić 45', 60'; Abdulla 55' (pen.)	Report	Debnath 48'; Lalpekhlua 78' (pen.)	Stadium: National Football Stadium; Attendance: 200; Referee: Dmitry Mashentsev (Kyrgyzstan)

17 May 2017	Mohun Bagan (India)	3–1	(India) Bengaluru FC	Kolkata
19:00 IST	Lalpekhlua 9'; Lewis 74'; Bi. Singh 80'	Report	Doungel 52'; Gill (yellow card) 87'	Stadium: Rabindra Sarobar Stadium; Attendance: 1,298; Referee: Ammar Mahfoodh (Bahrain)

31 May 2017	Dhaka Abahani (Bangladesh)	1–1	(India) Mohun Bagan	Dhaka
19:45 BDT	Onuoha 8'; Miah (yellow card) 63'	Report	Yusa (yellow card) 19' (goal) 83' (pen.); Bikramjit (yellow card) 46'	Stadium: Bangabandhu National Stadium; Attendance: 800; Referee: Sukhbir Singh (Singapore)

=== 2021 AFC Cup ===
Mohun Bagan qualified for the 2021 AFC Cup after winning the 2019-20 I-League which was moved to 2021–22 season due to schedule delays. ATK Mohun Bagan were drawn in Group D alongside Bashundhara Kings of Bangladesh, Bengaluru FC of India and Maziya S&RC of Maldives. Due to COVID-19 pandemic in Asia, the games were arranged in a centralized value in Malé, Maldives. In the opening game, ATK Mohun Bagan defeated Bengaluru FC 2-0 courtesy of a solitary strike from Roy Krishna and Subhasish Bose at the first half. ATK Mohun Bagan played Maziya S&RC in their next game and defeated them 3–1 with Liston Colaco, Roy Krishna and Manvir Singh scoring for Bagan. In their last group stage game, ATK Mohun Bagan held 1–1 draw against Bashundhara Kings of Bangladesh and qualified for the Inter-zone play-off semi-final where faced the Uzbekistan giants, FC Nasaf. ATK Mohun Bagan suffered a 6–0 defeat at Markaziy Stadium and were eliminated from the tournament.

==== Group stage ====
Pos	Team	Pld	W	D	L	GF	GA	GD	Pts	Qualification	MBSG	BSK	BFC	MAZ
1	(India) ATK Mohun Bagan	3	2	1	0	6	2	+4	7	Inter-zone play-off semi-finals	—	1–1	2–0	—
2	(Bangladesh) Bashundhara Kings	3	1	2	0	3	1	+2	5		—	—	—	2–0
3	(India) Bengaluru	3	1	1	1	6	4	+2	4		—	0−0	—	—
4	(Maldives) Maziya (H)	3	0	0	3	3	11	−8	0		1–3	—	2–6	—

Source: AFC
(H) Hosts

==== Bracket ====
Zonal semi-finals
(Bahrain) Al-Muharraq	3
(Lebanon) Al-Ahed	0
Al-Kuwait	2
(Jordan) Al-Salt	0

Zonal finals
(Bahrain) Al-Muharraq	2
Al-Kuwait	0
(Uzbekistan) Nasaf	3
(Turkmenistan) Ahal	2

Inter-zone play-off semi-finals
(Uzbekistan) Nasaf	6
(India) ATK Mohun Bagan	0

Inter-zone play-off final
(Uzbekistan) Nasaf (a.e.t.)	3
(Hong Kong) Lee Man	2

Final
(Bahrain) Al-Muharraq	3
(Uzbekistan) Nasaf	0

===== Matches =====
Win Draw Loss

18 August 2021 1	ATK Mohun Bagan (India)	2–0	(India) Bengaluru	Malé, Maldives
16:00 UTC+5	Krishna 39'; Bose 46'; Boumous (yellow card) 64'; Rathi (yellow card) 77'	Report	Silva (yellow card) 10'; Wangjam (yellow card) 90+4'	Stadium: National Football Stadium; Attendance: 0 (Note: Matches were played behind closed doors due to COVID-19 pandemic in Asia); Referee: (Jordan) Mohammad Arafah; Man of the Match: Roy Krishna (ATK Mohun Bagan)

21 August 2021 2	Maziya (Maldives)	1–3	(India) ATK Mohun Bagan	Malé, Maldives
21:00 UTC+5	Ibrahim 25'; Nihan (yellow card) 41'; Yaamin (yellow card) 80'	Report	Tangri (yellow card) 7'; Colaco 48'; Krishna 64'; Singh 77'; Boumous (yellow card) 80'	Stadium: National Football Stadium; Attendance: 0 Referee: (Hong Kong) Ping-Wun Tam; Man of the Match: Roy Krishna (ATK Mohun Bagan)

24 August 2021 3	ATK Mohun Bagan (India)	1–1	(Bangladesh) Bashundhara Kings	Malé, Maldives
16:00 UTC+5	Kotal (yellow card) 13'; Tangri (yellow card) 49'; Williams 62'	Report	Becerra (yellow card) 6'; Ghosh (yellow card) 20'; Fernandes 28'; Zoni (yellow card) 39'; Fahad (yellow card) 45'; Tripura (red card) 45+3'; Fernandes (yellow card) 80'	Stadium: National Football Stadium; Attendance: 0 Referee: (Oman) Qasim Al-Hatmi; Man of the Match: Jonathan Fernandes (Bashundhara Kings)

22 September 2021 Inter-zone play-off semi-final	Nasaf Qarshi (Uzbekistan)	6–0	(India) ATK Mohun Bagan	Qarshi, Uzbekistan
20:00 UTC+5	Kotal 4' (o.g.); Norchaev 18', 21', 31'; Bozorov 45+1'; Narzullaev 71'; Sadullayev (yellow card) 79'	Report	Bose (yellow card) 27'; Mehta (yellow card) 65'	Stadium: Markaziy Stadium; Attendance: 5,865; Referee: (Syria) Hanna Hattab; Man of the Match: Khusain Norchaev (Nasaf Qarshi)

=== 2022 AFC Cup ===
ATK Mohun Bagan qualified for the 2022 AFC Cup qualifying play-offs as the Runners Up of ISL Playoffs as Mumbai City FC had won both the ISL League Shield and ISL Playoffs Cup. In the Preliminary Round 2, ATK Mohun Bagan faced the Sri Lankan side Blue Star SC and defeated them 5–0 with a brace from Joni Kauko and Manvir Singh. In the Play-Off Round, Mohun Bagan defeated Abahani Limited Dhaka 3-1 courtesy of a solitary hattrick from David Williams and qualified for 2022 AFC Cup group stage. ATK Mohun Bagan were drawn in Group D alongside Bashundhara Kings of Bangladesh, Gokulam Kerala FC of India and Maziya S&RC of Maldives. Due to COVID-19 pandemic in Asia, the games were arranged in a centralized value in Kolkata, India. In their opening game, ATK Mohun Bagan suffered a 5–2 defeat against another Indian side Gokulam Kerala FC. However they managed to win their next two games, first against Bashundhara Kings by 4-0 and second against Maziya S&RC by 5-2 and qualified for the Inter-zone play-off semi-final where they faced Kuala Lumpur City F.C. of Malaysia. ATK Mohun Bagan suffered a 2–1 loss against the former and were eliminated from the tournament.

==== South Asia play-off ====
- (India) ATK Mohun Bagan advanced to Group D.

Preliminary round 1
(Nepal) Machhindra	1
(Sri Lanka) Blue Star	2
(Maldives) Valencia (a.e.t.)	2
(Bhutan) Paro	1

Preliminary round 2
(India) ATK Mohun Bagan	5
(Sri Lanka) Blue Star	0
(Bangladesh) Abahani Limited Dhaka	w/o
(Maldives) Valencia

Play-off round
(India) ATK Mohun Bagan	3
(Bangladesh) Abahani Limited Dhaka	1

==== Qualifying stage ====
===== Matches =====
Win Draw Loss

12 April 2022 Preliminary round 2	ATK Mohun Bagan (India)	5–0	(Sri Lanka) Blue Star	Kolkata, India
19:30 UTC+5:30	Kauko 24', 39' (pen.); M Singh 29', 88'; Das (yellow card) 33'; Williams 76'; Rathi (yellow card) 84'	Report		Stadium: Salt Lake Stadium; Attendance: 25,948; Referee: (Malaysia) Razlan Joffri Ali; Man of the Match: Joni Kauko (ATK Mohun Bagan)

19 April 2022 Play-off round	ATK Mohun Bagan (India)	3–1	(Bangladesh) Abahani Ltd. Dhaka	Kolkata, India
19:00 UTC+5:30	Williams 6', 29', 85'; Boumous (yellow card) 43'; Tangri (yellow card) 45+1'	Report	Colindres (yellow card) 17' (goal) 60'; Soleimani (yellow card) 43'; Royal (yellow card) 90+1'	Stadium: Vivekananda Yuba Bharati Krirangan; Attendance: 31,925; Referee: (Iran) Seyed Vahid Kazemi; Man of the Match: David Williams (ATK Mohun Bagan)

==== Group stage ====
Pos	Team	Pld	W	D	L	GF	GA	GD	Pts	Qualification	MBSG	BSK	MAZ	GOK
1	(India) ATK Mohun Bagan (H)	3	2	0	1	11	6	+5	6 (Note: Head-to-head points: ATK Mohun Bagan 3, Bashundhara Kings 0.)	Inter-zone play-off semi-finals	—	4–0	—	—
2	(Bangladesh) Bashundhara Kings	3	2	0	1	3	5	−2	6		—	—	1–0	—
3	(Maldives) Maziya	3	1	0	2	3	6	−3	3 (Note: Head-to-head points: Maziya 3, Gokulam Kerala 0.)		2–5	—	—	1–0
4	(India) Gokulam Kerala	3	1	0	2	5	5	0	3		4–2	1–2	—	—

Source: AFC
Rules for classification: Tiebreakers
(H) Hosts

===== Matches =====
Win Draw Loss

18 May 2022 1	Gokulam Kerala (India)	4–2	(India) ATK Mohun Bagan	Kolkata, India
16:30 UTC+4:30	Benny (yellow card) 24'; Majcen 50', 65'; Rishad 57'; Hakku (yellow card) 68'; Jithin 89'	Report	Tiri (yellow card) 37'; Pritam Kotal 53'; Prabir Das (yellow card) 70'; Colaco 80'	Stadium: Vivekananda Yuba Bharati Krirangan; Attendance: 31,790; Referee: (Iran) Seyed Vahid Kazemi; Man of the Match: Luka Majcen (Gokulam Kerala)

21 May 2022 2	ATK Mohun Bagan (India)	4–0	(Bangladesh) Bashundhara Kings	Kolkata, India
16:30 UTC+5:30	Colaco 24', 33', 53'; Williams 77'	Report	Shafiei (yellow card) 67'; Figuera (yellow card) 72'	Stadium: Vivekananda Yuba Bharati Krirangan; Attendance: 34,595; Referee: (Chinese Taipei) Chen Hsin-Chuan; Man of the Match: Liston Colaco (ATK Mohun Bagan)

24 May 2022 3	Maziya (Maldives)	2–5	(India) ATK Mohun Bagan	Kolkata, India
20:30 UTC+5:30	Tana 45', 73'	Report	Kauko 26', 37'; Tangri (yellow card) 30'; Krishna 56'; Bose 58'; McHugh 71'	Stadium: Vivekananda Yuba Bharati Krirangan; Attendance: 33,729; Referee: (Brunei) Abdul Hakim Haidi; Man of the Match: Joni Kauko (ATK Mohun Bagan)

==== Knockout stage ====
===== Match =====
Win Draw Loss

7 September 2022 Inter-zone play-off semi-final	ATK Mohun Bagan (India)	1–3	(Malaysia) Kuala Lumpur City	Kolkata, India
1900 UTC+5:30	Pogba (yellow card) 73'; Molla 90+1'; Bose (yellow card) 90+2'	Report	Azizi (yellow card) 30'; Josué 60'; Gallifuoco (yellow card) 79'; Aiman 90+2'; Mintah (yellow card) 90+4'; Morales 90+5'	Stadium: Vivekananda Yuba Bharati Krirangan; Attendance: 18,594; Referee: (Saudi Arabia) Khaled Al Teris; Man of the Match: Paulo Josué (Kuala Lumpur City)

=== 2023–24 AFC Cup ===
Mohun Bagan Super Giant qualified for the 2023–24 AFC Cup qualifying play-offs after winning the ISL Playoffs Cup. They defeated Machhindra F.C. 3–1 in the Preliminary Round 2 with Anwar Ali scoring a brace for Mohun Bagan. In the Play-Off Round, Mohun Bagan defeated Abahani Limited Dhaka of Bangladesh by 3-1 and qualified for the 2023–24 AFC Cup group stage. They were drawn in Group D alongside another Indian Club Odisha FC, Bashundhara Kings of Bangladesh and Maziya S&RC of Maldives. Mohun Bagan started their campaign with a terrific note as they won their first two games defeating Odisha FC 4–0 away from home and Maziya S&RC by 2–1 with a brace from Jason Cummings at the Salt Lake Stadium. Mohun Bagan held 2–2 draw at home but suffered a 2–1 loss away from home against Bashundhara Kings. Mohun Bagan ended their campaign with a disappointment as they suffered a 5–2 defeat against Odisha FC at the Salt Lake Stadium and 1–0 defeat against Maziya S&RC away from home. They finished third in the group with 7 points and were eliminated from the tournament.

==== South Asia play-off ====
- (India) Mohun Bagan Super Giant advanced to Group D.

Preliminary round 1
(Nepal) Machhindra	3
(Bhutan) Paro	2

Preliminary round 2
(India) Mohun Bagan SG	3
(Nepal) Machhindra	1
(Bangladesh) Dhaka Abahani	2
(Maldives) Club Eagles	1

Play-off round
(India) Mohun Bagan SG	3
(Bangladesh) Dhaka Abahani	1

===== Matches =====
Win Draw Loss

16 August 2023 Preliminary round 2	Mohun Bagan SG (India)	3–1	(Nepal) Machhindra	Kolkata, India
19:00 UTC+5:30	Ali 39', 86'; Cummings 59'; Martins (yellow card) 75'	Report	Omolaja (yellow card) 60'; Oloumou 78'	Stadium: Vivekananda Yuba Bharati Krirangan; Attendance: 2,892; Referee: (United Arab Emirates) Ahmed Eisa Mohamed; Man of the Match: Anwar Ali

22 August 2023 Play-off round	Mohun Bagan SG (India)	3–1	(Bangladesh) Dhaka Abahani	Kolkata, India
19:00 UTC+5:30	Cummings 37' (pen.); Bose (yellow card) 52'; Soleimani 58' (o.g.); Sadiku 60'	Report	Stewart 17'; Bablu (yellow card) 9'; Muzaffarov (yellow card) 25'; Sushanto (yellow card) 36'; Yousef (yellow card) 69'; Soleimani (yellow card) 71'	Stadium: Vivekananda Yuba Bharati Krirangan; Attendance: 10,625; Referee: (Iran) Bijan Heydari; Man of the Match: Jason Cummings

==== Group Stage ====
Pos	Team	Pld	W	D	L	GF	GA	GD	Pts	Qualification	ODI	BDK	MBSG	MAZ
1	(India) Odisha	6	4	0	2	17	12	+5	12	Inter-zone play-off semi-finals	—	1–0	0–4	6–1
2	(Bangladesh) Bashundhara Kings	6	3	1	2	10	10	0	10		3–2	—	2–1	2–1
3	(India) Mohun Bagan SG	6	2	1	3	11	11	0	7		2–5	2–2	—	2–1
4	(Maldives) Maziya	6	2	0	4	9	14	−5	6		2–3	3–1	1–0	—

Source: AFC
Rules for classification: Group stage tiebreakers

===== Matches =====
Win Draw Loss

19 September 2023 1	Odisha (India)	0–4	(India) Mohun Bagan SG	Bhubaneswar, India
19:30 IST	Fall (yellow card) 10' (yellow-red card) 42'; Jahouh (yellow card) 42'; Jadhav (yellow card) 85'	Report	Sahal 46'; Yuste (yellow card) 66'; Petratos 68', 82'; Colaco 79'	Stadium: Kalinga Stadium; Attendance: 5,218; Referee: (Oman) Omar Mubarak Mazaroua Al-Yaqoubi; Man of the Match: Dimitri Petratos

3 October 2023 2	Mohun Bagan SG (India)	2–1	(Maldives) Maziya	Kolkata, India
19:30 IST	Cummings 28', 90+2'	Report	Tomoki Wada 45'	Stadium: Vivekananda Yuba Bharati Krirangan; Attendance: 26,794; Man of the Match: Cummings

24 October 2023 3	Mohun Bagan SG (India)	2–2	(Bangladesh) Bashundhara Kings	Bhubaneswar, India
21:30 IST	Petratos 29'; Rai 54'	Report	Dorielton 33'; Robinho 70'	Stadium: Kalinga Stadium; Attendance: 150; Referee: Clifford Postanes Daypuyat (Philippines)

7 November 2023 4	Bashundhara Kings (Bangladesh)	2–1	(India) Mohun Bagan SG	Dhaka, Bangladesh
19:00 IST				Stadium: Bashundhara Kings Arena

27 November 2023 5	Mohun Bagan SG (India)	2–5	(India) Odisha	Kolkata, India
19:30 IST	Boumous 17'; Nassiri 63'		Krishna 29'; Diego Maurício 32'; Goddard 41'; Jadhav 90+2'; Vanlalruatfela 90+5'	Stadium: Vivekananda Yuba Bharati Krirangan; Attendance: 15000; Referee: Gamini Nivon Robesh (Sri Lanka)

12 December 2023 6	Maziya (Maldives)	1–0	(India) Mohun Bagan SG	Malé, Maldives
19:00 IST	Raif 40'			Stadium: National Football Stadium

=== 2024–25 AFC Champions League Two ===
Mohun Bagan Super Giant qualified for the 2024–25 AFC Champions League Two after winning the ISL League Shield and were drawn in Group A alongside Tractor S.C. of Iran, Ravshan Kulob of Tajikistan and Al-Wakrah SC of Qatar. On 18 September 2024, Mohun Bagan faced Ravshan Kulob at the Salt Lake Stadium where they held 0–0 draw and secured one point in the group. On 7 October 2024, AFC announced that Mohun Bagan SG were considered to have withdrawn from the AFC Champions League Two "after the club failed to report to Tabriz for their fixture against Tractor" due to security concerns.

==== Group stage ====
Pos	Team	Pld	W	D	L	GF	GA	GD	Pts	Qualification	TRA	WAK	RAV	MBSG
1	(Iran) Tractor	4	3	1	0	16	4	+12	10	Advance to round of 16	—	3–3	7–0	~~2 Oct~~
2	(Qatar) Al-Wakrah	4	1	1	2	4	8	−4	4	Advance to round of 16	0–3	—	0–2	~~6 Nov~~
3	(Tajikistan) Ravshan Kulob	4	1	0	3	3	11	−8	3		1–3	0–1	—	~~27 Nov~~
4	(India) Mohun Bagan SG	0	0	0	0	0	0	0	0	Withdrew, record expunged (Note: On 7 October 2024, AFC announced that Mohun Bagan SG were considered to have withdrawn from the AFC Champions League Two after they failed to appear for their fixture against Tractor in Tabriz due to safety concerns. Their single match was expunged.)	~~4 Dec~~	~~23 Oct~~	~~0–0~~	—

Source: AFC
Rules for classification: Tiebreakers

==== Matches ====
Win Draw Loss

18 September 2024	Mohun Bagan SG (India)	Voided (0–0)	(Tajikistan) Ravshan Kulob	Salt Lake Stadium, Kolkata
19:30		Report		Attendance: 18,908; Referee: Ahmed Issa

2 October 2024	Tractor (Iran)	Cancelled (Note: The match was cancelled by Asian Football Confederation (AFC) as Mohan Bagan SG refused to travel to Tabriz, Iran citing security reasons followed by the current advisory by the Embassy of The Republic of India in Tehran, Iran due to the State mourning for Hezbollah leader Hassan Nasrallah. Consequently on 7 October, AFC announced that Mohun Bagan SG were considered to have withdrawn from the AFC Champions League Two.)	(India) Mohun Bagan SG	Yadegar-e Emam Stadium, Tabriz
19:30 UTC+3:30

23 October 2024	Mohun Bagan SG (India)	Cancelled	(Qatar) Al-Wakrah	Vivekananda Yuba Bharati Krirangan Stadium, Kolkata
19:30 UTC+5:30

6 November 2024	Al-Wakrah (Qatar)	Cancelled	(India) Mohun Bagan SG	Al Janoub Stadium, Al Wakrah
19:00 UTC+3

27 November 2024	Ravshan Kulob (Tajikistan)	Cancelled	(India) Mohun Bagan SG	Central Republican Stadium, Dushanbe
19:00 UTC+5

4 December 2024	Mohun Bagan SG (India)	Cancelled	(Iran) Tractor	Vivekananda Yuba Bharati Krirangan Stadium, Kolkata
21:30 UTC+5:30

=== 2025–26 AFC Champions League Two ===
Mohun Bagan Super Giant qualified for the 2025–26 AFC Champions League Two for the second time after winning the ISL League Shield and were drawn in Group D alongside Sepahan S.C. of Iran, Ahal FK of Turkmenistan and Al-Hussein Irbid FC of Jordan.

==== Group stage ====
Pos	Team	Pld	W	D	L	GF	GA	GD	Pts	Qualification	ALH	SEP	AHA	MBG
1	(Jordan) Al-Hussein	4	3	0	1	8	4	+4	9	Advance to round of 16	—	1–0	3–1	~~21 Oct~~
2	(Iran) Sepahan	4	2	1	1	5	3	+2	7	Advance to round of 16	2–0	—	2–2	~~30 Sep~~
3	(Turkmenistan) Ahal	4	0	1	3	4	10	−6	1		1–4	0–1	—	~~25 Nov~~
4	(India) Mohun Bagan	0	0	0	0	0	0	0	0	Withdrew (Note: On 27 September 2025, AFC announced that Mohun Bagan SG were considered to have withdrawn from the AFC Champions League Two after they failed to travel to Iran to play their fixture against Sepahan in Isfahan, citing security concerns. Their single match played, a 1–0 defeat to Ahal, was annulled and all their remaining matches were cancelled. This was the second year in a row that Mohun Bagan had been withdrawn from the competition for refusing to fulfill a fixture in Iran. In December 2025 the AFC banned them from entering the following season's AFC competitions, meaning they will not be eligible to re-enter the Champions League until the 2027–28 season)	~~4 Nov~~	~~23 Dec~~	~~0–1~~	—

Source: ACL2
Rules for classification: Tiebreakers

==== Matches ====
16 September 2025 Group Stage	Mohun Bagan (India)	Voided (0–1)	(Turkmenistan) Ahal	Vivekananda Yuba Bharati Krirangan, Kolkata
19:15 UTC+5:30	Tom Aldred (yellow card) 45+1'	Report	N. Tovakelov (yellow card) 70'; Enver Annayev 83'	Attendance: 41,003; Referee: Clifford Daypuyat (Philippines)

30 September 2025 Group Stage	Sepahan (Iran)	Cancelled (Note: On 27 September 2025, AFC announced that Mohun Bagan SG were considered to have withdrawn from the AFC Champions League Two after they failed to appear for their fixture against Sepahan in Isfahan. Their single match was voided.)	(India) Mohun Bagan	Isfahan
21:30 IST				Stadium: Naghsh-e-Jahan Stadium

21 October 2025 Group Stage	Al-Hussein (Jordan)	Cancelled	(India) Mohun Bagan	Amman
23:45 IST				Stadium: Amman International Stadium

4 November 2025 Group Stage	Mohun Bagan (India)	Cancelled	(Jordan) Al-Hussein	Kolkata
19:15 IST				Stadium: Salt Lake Stadium

25 November 2025 Group Stage	Ahal (Turkmenistan)	Cancelled	(India) Mohun Bagan	Isfahan, Iran
				Stadium: Naghsh-e-Jahan Stadium

23 December 2025 Group Stage	Mohun Bagan (India)	Cancelled	(Iran) Sepahan	Kolkata
19:15 IST				Stadium: Salt Lake Stadium

== Mohun Bagan International Tours ==
=== Mohun Bagan Tour of Indonesia, Singapore and Honk Kong, 1956 ===
Mohun Bagan went for the first foreign tour in 1956. It was the tour of Far East where Mohun Bagan played several matches in Indonesia, Singapore and Hong Kong. This tour was extremely significant as while the Calcutta Football League matches used to a 50-minute affair those days, all the matches that Mohun Bagan played during this tour were 90 minute games. The Mohun Bagan team in that tour comprised the following players: Sailen Manna (Captain), Swaraj Chatterjee, Robin Guha, Narsiah, Ratan Sen, Parimal Majumdar, Chandan Singh, Subhasish Guha, Dulal Mukherjee, Badru Banerjee, Chuni Goswami, Sattar, Raman, Keshta Dutta, Keshta Pal and P. K. Banerjee. P. K. Banerjee played for Mohun Bagan in this tour in loan.

==== Indonesia ====
Win Draw Loss

25 February 1956 1	Mohun Bagan (India)	2-0	(Indonesia) PSMS Medan B	Indonesia
	Samar Banerjee (?) (?)			Stadium: Teladan Stadium

26 February 1956 2	Mohun Bagan (India)	1–1	(Indonesia) PSMS Medan A	Indonesia
	P. K. Banerjee (?)		no information	Stadium: Teladan Stadium

28 February 1956 3	Mohun Bagan (India)	4–4	(Indonesia) PSP Padang	Indonesia
	Krishna Pal (?) (?) (?); P. K. Banerjee (?)		no information

4 March 1956 4	Mohun Bagan (India)	3–1	(Indonesia) POB Dynamo	Indonesia
	Sarangapani Raman (?); P. K. Banerjee (?); Samar Banerjee (?)		no information

6 March 1956 5	Mohun Bagan (India)	5–3	(Indonesia) Bintang Mebah Club	Indonesia
	Krishna Pal (?) (?); P. K. Banerjee (?) (?); Samar Banerjee (?)		no information

==== Singapore ====
Win Draw Loss

9 March 1956 1	Mohun Bagan (India)	4–1	(Singapore) Sino-Indian Team	Singapore
	Krishna Pal (?); P. K. Banerjee (?); Samar Banerjee (?); Chuni Goswami (?)		no information

10 March 1956 2	Mohun Bagan (India)	3–2	(Singapore) Sino Malay XI	Singapore
	Krishna Pal (?); P. K. Banerjee (?); Samar Banerjee (?)		no information

13 March 1956 3	Mohun Bagan (India)	1–2	(Singapore) SAFA XI	Singapore
	no information		no information

==== Hong Kong ====
Win Draw Loss

17 March 1956 1	Mohun Bagan (India)	6–2	All Hong Kong XI	Hong Kong
	Krishna Pal (?) (?); P. K. Banerjee (?) (?) (?); Own Goal		no information

18 March 1956 2	Mohun Bagan (India)	5–1	Combined Hong Kong XI	Hong Kong
	Krishna Pal (?) (?) (?) (?); Chuni Goswami (?)		no information

21 March 1956 3	Mohun Bagan (India)	0–1	(China) Combined Chinese XI	Hong Kong
			no information

4 June 1956 4	Mohun Bagan (India)	1–8	(China) Chinese Olympic XI	Hong Kong
	Mohammad Abdus Sattar (?)		no information

27 August 1956 5	Mohun Bagan (India)	1–1	Indonesia XI	Hong Kong
	Amal Chakraborty (?)		no information

=== Mohun Bagan tour of east Africa, 1961 ===
In 1960, Mohun Bagan won the Calcutta Football League and IFA Shield and based upon the club's performance, the club received invitation from African countries in 1961. Out of 19 Matches, Mohun Bagan won 13, drew 5 and lost only one. After the tour of East Africa, Mohun Bagan participated in 3 exhibition matches in Mauritius. Mohun Bagan won one, drew one and lost one game. The Mohun Bagan team in that tour comprised the following players: Sanath Seth, Sushil Guha, Jarnail Sing, Rahaman, Prasanta Sarkhel, Kempiah, Narsiah, Asim Dhar, Dipu Das, Salauddin, Amal Chakraborty, Asoke Chatterjee, Chidanandan, Amiya Banerjee, Chuni Goswami, Arumaynayagam.

Win Draw Loss

25 February 1961 1	Mohun Bagan (India)	4–0	(South Africa) North Province	Africa
	Dipu Das (?) (?) (?); Salauddin (?)		no information

28 February 1961 2	Mohun Bagan (India)	4–4	(South Africa) Bunang Province	Africa
	Dipu Das (?); Arumainayagam (?); Chuni Goswami (?); Amiya Banerjee (?)		no information

3 March 1961 3	Mohun Bagan (India)	6–2	(Ethiopia) Basona District	Africa
	Arumainayagam (?) (?); Chuni Goswami (?) (?); Chidanandan (?) (?)		no information

5 March 1961 1st Test	Mohun Bagan (India)	1–0	(Ethiopia) Uganda Province	Africa
	Amiya Banerjee (?)		no information

8 March 1961 4	Mohun Bagan (India)	2–1	(Kenya) Nyanza Province	Africa
	Chuni Goswami (?); Chidanandan (?)		no information

10 March 1961 5	Mohun Bagan (India)	8–1	(Tanganyika (1961–1964)) Lake Province	Africa
	Amiya Banerjee (?) (?) (?) (?) (?); Salauddin (?) (?); Arumainayagam (?)		no information

12 March 1961 6	Mohun Bagan (India)	2–2	(Kenya) Nairobi XI	Africa
	Amiya Banerjee (?); Jarnail Singh (?)		no information

13 March 1961 7	Mohun Bagan (India)	3–0	(Tanganyika (1961–1964)) Dar es Salaam XI	Africa
	Chuni Goswami (?) (?); Chidanandan (?)		no information

16 March 1961 2nd Test	Mohun Bagan (India)	1–1	(Tanganyika (1961–1964)) Tanzania XI	Africa
	Own Goal		no information

18 March 1961 8	Mohun Bagan (India)	3–2	Kenya Coast Province	Africa
	Amiya Banerjee (?); Chuni Goswami (?); Arumainayagam (?)		no information

20 March 1961 3rd Test	Mohun Bagan (India)	6–6	(Tanganyika (1961–1964)) Zanzibar XI	Africa
	Chidanandan (?) (?); Chuni Goswami (?); Arumainayagam (?); Dipu Das (?) (?)		no information

25 March 1961 4th Test	Mohun Bagan (India)	1–3	Kenya XI	Africa
	Chidanandan (?)		no information

1961 9	Mohun Bagan (India)	1–0	Kenya Gossage	Africa
	Arumainayagam (?)		no information

1961 10	Mohun Bagan (India)	3–1	Kenya Central Province XI	Africa
	Chuni Goswami (?) (?); Arumainayagam (?)		no information

1961 11	Mohun Bagan (India)	5–0	(United Arab Republic) Aswan XI	Africa
	no information		no information

1961 12	Mohun Bagan (India)	4–0	(South Africa) Tunga XI	Africa
	no information		no information

=== Mohun Bagan tour of Europe, 1961–68 ===
Mohun Bagan played four games against the European teams that included teams from Russia, teams from Hungary and teams from Slovakia. Although Bagan failed to register a win against these teams but that got their much needed international experience throughout their campaign.

Win Draw Loss

9 December 1961 1	Mohun Bagan (India)	0–4	(Soviet Union) Russian Army Team	Russia
			no information

18 November 1964 2	Mohun Bagan (India)	0–3	(Hungary) Tatabányai SC	Hungary
			no information

2 December 1964 3	Mohun Bagan (India)	0–2	(Hungary) Tatabányai SC	Delhi
			no information

4 January 1968 4	Mohun Bagan (India)	0–5	(Czechoslovakia) ŠK Slovan Bratislava	Slovakia
			no information

=== Mohun Bagan tour of Sri Lanka, 1968 ===
Mohun Bagan played four games against the Sri-Lankan teams in 1968 and were unbeated throughout the campaign. They won two games and drew two games during their journey. The Mohun Bagan team in that tour comprised the following players: Balai Dey, Kamal Sarkar, Pradyut Barman, Bikramjit Debnath, Chandreshwar Prasad, Syed Naimuddin, Altaf, Sushil Sinha, Bhawani Roy, Nitya Ghosh, Latif, K. Banerjee, Asoke Chatterjee, Amal Chakraborty, Arumaynayagam, Pranab Ganguly, P. Kannan, Habib, Sitesh Das, Chuni Goswami

Win Draw Loss

17 April 1968 1	Mohun Bagan (India)	5–1	(Dominion of Ceylon) Sunrise Sports Club	Sri Lanka
	no information		no information

19 April 1968 2	Mohun Bagan (India)	1–1	(Dominion of Ceylon) Swalkar	Sri Lanka
	no information		no information

1968 3	Mohun Bagan (India)	2–2	(Dominion of Ceylon) Victoria Club	Sri Lanka
	no information		no information

1968 4	Mohun Bagan (India)	1–0	(Dominion of Ceylon) Combined Sri Lanka XI	Sri Lanka
	no information		no information

=== Mohun Bagan tour of Bangladesh, 1972 ===
Mohun Bagan was the first foreign club who toured Bangladesh in 1972 after the latter got independence. Mohun Bagan won the first match of goodwill tour against Dhaka Mohammedan by 1–0 margin courtesy to Ashoke Chatterjee's goal. Mariners lost the second match 0–1 against Dhaka XI when they conceded last moment goal. The Mohun Bagan team in that tour comprised the following players: Sudhir kumar karmakar, Prashanta Mitra, Kajal Pal, Nimai Goswami, Nirmal Sengupta, Bhavani Roy, Shyamsundar Manna, Priyalal Majumdar, Shankar Banerjee, Surajit Sengupta, Binoy Panja, Subhash Bhowmick, Mohammad Nazir, Ashok Chatterjee.

Win Draw Loss

11 May 1972 1	Mohun Bagan (India)	1–0	(Bangladesh) Mohammedan SC	Bangladesh
	Ashok Chatterjee (?)

13 May 1972 2	Mohun Bagan (India)	0–1	(Bangladesh) Dhaka XI	Bangladesh
			Kazi Salahuddin 68'

=== Mohun Bagan tour of Malaysia and Singapore, 1978 ===
Mohun Bagan started their tour with a 1–1 draw against the Malaysian XI on 13 May 1978. Bidesh Basu scored the only goal for Mohun Bagan. Although Bagan lost their next game against Singapore XI 3-0 but they managed to hold 1–1 draw against Malaysian Indian XI and defeated the Singapore B team 4–1 to end their tour. The Mohun Bagan team in that tour comprised the following players: Shibaji Banerjee, Santosh Basu, Sudhir Karmakar, Subrata Bhattacharya, Pradeep Chowdhury, Dilip Palit, Compton Dutta, Shyamal Banerjee, Sarkar, Prasun Banerjee, Subhash Bhowmick, Shyam Thapa, Habib, Akbar, Manas Bhattacharya, Bidesh Basu.

Win Draw Loss

13 May 1978 1	Mohun Bagan (India)	1–1	Malaysia XI	Malaysia
	Bidesh Ranjan Bose (?)		no information

16 May 1978 2	Mohun Bagan (India)	0–3	Singapore XI	Singapore
			no information

18 May 1978 3	Mohun Bagan (India)	1–1	(Malaysia) Malaysian Indian XI	Malaysia
	Mohammed Habib (?)		no information

20 May 1978 4	Mohun Bagan (India)	4–1	Singapore B XI	Singapore
	Bidesh Ranjan Bose (?) (?) (?); Shyam Thapa (?)		no information

=== Mohun Bagan Tour of Nepal, 1979 ===
In 1979, Mohun Bagan participated in two exhibition games in Nepal after playing in the Calcutta Football League. In their opening game against Kathmandu XI, Mohun Bagan defeated the former 8–1 with a hattrick from Shyam Thapa. In their next game, they defeated Nepal XI 2–0 to conclude their tour. The Mohun Bagan team in that tour comprised the following players: Pratap Ghosh, Shibaji Banerjee, Shyamal Banerjee, Subrata Bhattacharya, Compton Dutta, Dilip Palit, Gautam Sarkar, Prasun Banerjee, Pradeep Chowdhury, Shyam Thapa, Xavier Payas, Manas Bhattacharya, Ranjit Mukherjee, Ulganathan, Bidesh Basu.

Win Draw Loss

1979 1	Mohun Bagan (India)	8–1	(Nepal) Kathmandu XI	Nepal
	Shyam Thapa (?) (?) (?); Xavier Payas (?) (?); Manas Bhattacharya (?); Narayanswami Ulaganathan (?); Kesto Mitra (?)

1979 2	Mohun Bagan (India)	2–0	Nepal XI	Nepal
	Xavier Payas (?); Manas Bhattacharya (?)

=== Mohun Bagan tour of Mauritius, 1988 ===
Mohun Bagan participated in three exhibition games to mark the 40th Anniversary of the local Cadet Club. Out of three games, they won one, drew one and lost one throughout their campaign.

Win Draw Loss

7 December 1988 1	Mohun Bagan (India)	0–4	(Mauritius) Fire Brigade Team	Mauritius
			no information

10 December 1988 2	Mohun Bagan (India)	0–0	(Mauritius) Sunrise	Mauritius

13 December 1988 3	Mohun Bagan (India)	3–1	(Mauritius) Cavetts Club	Mauritius
	Satyajit Chatterjee (?) (?); Prasanta Banerjee (?)

=== Mohun Bagan tour of Myanmar, 2004 ===
Mohun Bagan toured Myanmar on 2004 where to defeated the U21 Myanmar XI by 1-0 and held 1–1 draw against Myanmar Senior National Team courtesy to Biman Mondal's goal. They suffered a 4–0 loss against Myanmar XI at the start of their campaign. The Mohun Bagan team in that tour comprised the following players: Prasanta Dora, Imran Khan, Manitombi Singh, Rishi Kapoor, Palash Karmakar, Basudeb Mondal, Mehtab Hussain, Abhay Kumar, Ashim Biswas, Sunil Chetri, Subrata Paul, Praveen Rawat, Gouramangi Moirangtem Singh, Malswama, Jerry Zirsanga, Bibhas Ghosh, Hussain Mustafi, Manas Das, Tapan Ghosh, Falguni Datta, Noel Anthony Wilson, Nongmaithem Rajesh Meetei, Tomba Singh, Dharamjit Singh, Amit Das, Biman Mondal, Mehraj Din Wadoo, Eduardo Chacon Coelho Lacerda, Dulal Biswas, Regis Carlos Pimentel Monteiro.

Win Draw Loss

3 August 2004 1	Mohun Bagan (India)	0–4	Myanmar XI	Myanmar
			no information

5 August 2004 2	Mohun Bagan (India)	1–0	U21 Myanmar XI	Myanmar
	Malswama (?)

7 August 2004 3	Mohun Bagan (India)	1–1	Myanmar Senior National Team	Myanmar
	Biman Mondal (?)		no information

=== Mohun Bagan tour of Nepal, 2012–13 ===
Mohun Bagan participated in two exhibition games in Nepal. One was on 12 May 2012, against Nepal Police Club where they suffered a 2–0 loss and the other one was against Three Star Club in the next year on 2 May where they suffered a 1–2 defeat.

Win Draw Loss

12 May 2012 1	Mohun Bagan (India)	0–2	Nepal Police Club	Nepal
			no information

2 May 2013 2	Mohun Bagan (India)	1–2	(Nepal) Three Star Club	Nepal
	Dipendu Biswas (?)		no information

== Bibliography ==
Books

- Mukhopadhyay, Subir (2018). Sonay Lekha Itihase Mohunbagan (in Bengali). Kolkata: Nabajatak.
- Ray, Rishav (2024). A Game of Two Halves: The Story of the Golden Era of Indian Club Football. Kolkata: Exceller Books.
- Chattopadhyay, Hariprasad (2017). Mohun Bagan-East Bengal (in Bengali). Kolkata: Parul Prakashan.
