= George Ekeh =

Nigerian-Swedish footballer

Personal information
- Date of birth: 10 July 1980 (age 46)
- Place of birth: Festac Town, Lagos State, Nigeria
- Position: Forward

Senior career*
Years	Team	Apps	(Gls)
- Indian Telephone Industries
?–2002	Indian Telephone Industries		
2002–2003	Mohun Bagan		
- Stade Tunisien
2005–20xx	Carlstad United BK		
20xx–2007	Churchill Brothers S.C.		
2008–2009	Gröndals IK		(8)
2009–2010	Arameisk-Syrianska IF		(4)
2010	Atlantis FC		
2011	Örebro Syrianska IF		(9)
2012	Bangkok Glass F.C.		
- Delta Örebro IF
- Vivalla SK
- * Club domestic league appearances and goals

George Ekeh (born 10 July 1980) is a Nigerian-Swedish former footballer who played as a forward.

== Career ==
Ekeh was born in Festac Town, Lagos State, Nigeria.

=== India ===
Ekeh scored hat-tricks twice for Mohun Bagan, scoring all his team's goals in a 3–3 draw with JCT in 2002 and a 3–1 victory over defending champion HAL in 2003. In September 2003, however, he complained that Mohun Bagan had not paid him the amount they owed him, taking the case to FIFA, which ordered the Mariners to pay the Nigerian the $6500 he was due.

In 2007, he played as a forward for Churchill Brothers.

=== Finland ===
Ekeh topped the scoring charts of the 2010 Kakkonen with Atlantis by May 2010, scoring nine goals.

== Personal life ==
He is the brother of Emmanuel Ekeh and Sunny Kingsley Ekeh.
