= Krishna Pal (footballer) =

Indian footballer

Personal information
- Full name: Krishna Chandra Pal
- Date of birth: 1934
- Date of death: 14 October 2009 (aged 74–75)
- Place of death: Kolkata, West Bengal, India
- Height: 1.73 m (5 ft 8 in)
- Position: Forward

Senior career*
Years	Team	Apps	(Gls)
- Juger Pratik
- Bhawanipore FC
- Mohun Bagan

International career
- India
- * Club domestic league appearances and goals

Krishna "Kesto" Chandra Pal (1934 – 14 October 2009) was an Indian footballer. He competed in the men's tournament at the 1956 Summer Olympics.
