= 2014–15 Oman Professional League Cup =

Tournament details
- Country: Oman
- Teams: 14

Tournament statistics
- Matches played: 45
- Goals scored: 92 (2.04 per match)
- Top goal scorer(s): (Brazil) Tiago Chulapa (5 goals)

The 2014–15 Oman Professional League Cup (known as the Mazda Professional Cup for sponsorship reasons) is the fourth edition of a domestic football competition held in Oman.

The competition features four groups of 3-4 teams (Group A and B featured 4 teams and Group C and D featured 3 teams), with the group stage winners entering the semi-finals stage. Groups featuring three sides played each other twice so that each team could play 6 matches in the group phase.

The competition featured all the clubs playing in the top flight in the 2014–15 season.

The competition began on 13 November 2014, and will conclude on 29 January 2015.

In 2014, ahead of the 2014–15 Oman Professional League Cup, it was announced by Oman Football Association that Mazda have agreed to sponsor the Professional League Cup and will henceforth be known as the Mazda Professional Cup, for a period of four years. According to a four-year agreement reached by the two parties, Mazda became the title sponsor of the 14-team competition.

== Group stage ==
=== Group A ===
Team	Pld	W	D	L	GF	GA	GD	Pts
(Oman) Dhofar	6	3	2	1	9	3	+6	11
(Oman) Al-Seeb	6	3	2	1	8	4	+4	11
(Oman) Al-Nasr	6	3	2	1	8	5	+3	11
(Oman) Bowsher	6	0	0	6	1	12	−11	0

13 November 2014
17:50 UTC+4

Al-Seeb	1 – 2	Al-Nasr
Al-Noufali		Koffi; Faraj

Muscat, Oman
13 November 2014
20:30 UTC+4

Dhofar	4 – 0	Bowsher
Ashoor; Fernando; Al-Mushaifri; Rabea

Al-Saada Stadium, Salalah, Oman
19 November 2014
18:15 UTC+4

Al-Nasr	0 - 0	Dhofar

Al-Saada Stadium, Salalah, Oman
19 November 2014
17:50 UTC+4

Bowsher	0 - 1	Al-Seeb
		Mohannad (pen.)

Sultan Qaboos Sports Complex, Muscat, Oman
24 November 2014
17:50 UTC+4

Bowsher	1 - 2	Al-Nasr
Al-Hidabi		Al-Hamar; Ablaye Gaye

Sultan Qaboos Sports Complex, Muscat, Oman
24 November 2014
17:50 UTC+4

Dhofar	1 - 1	Al-Seeb
Igor		Al-Maharmi

Al-Saada Stadium, Salalah, Oman
28 December 2014
17:45 UTC+4

Bowsher	0 - 1	Dhofar
		Al-Rajaibi 36'

Sultan Qaboos Sports Complex, Muscat, Oman
28 December 2014
18:15 UTC+4

Al-Nasr	1 - 1	Al-Seeb
Ablaye Gaye		Al-Mukhaini (pen.)

Al-Saada Stadium, Salalah, Oman
1 January 2014
16:40 UTC+4

Al-Seeb	2 - 0	Bowsher
Al-Mukhaini; Al-Saadi

Al-Seeb Stadium, Al-Seeb, Oman
1 January 2014
18:15 UTC+4

Dhofar	2 - 1	Al-Nasr
Rabea; Rabea		Ablaye Gaye

Al-Saada Stadium, Salalah, Oman
5 January 2014
16:45 UTC+4

Al-Seeb	2 - 1	Dhofar
Al-Saadi; Al-Busaidi		Al-Mushaifri

Al-Seeb Stadium, Al-Seeb, Oman
5 January 2014
18:15 UTC+4

Al-Nasr	2 - 0	Bowsher
Al-Mashari 40'; Ablaye Gaye

Al-Saada Stadium, Salalah, Oman

=== Group B ===
Team	Pld	W	D	L	GF	GA	GD	Pts
(Oman) Saham	6	4	2	0	9	3	+6	14
(Oman) Sohar	6	3	1	2	5	4	+1	10
(Oman) Al-Khabourah	6	1	2	3	7	10	−3	5
(Oman) Al-Nahda	6	0	3	3	3	7	−4	3

13 November 2014
16:45 UTC+4

Saham	3 – 1	Al-Nahda
Huvos; Huvos; Al-Khaldi		Al-Shamsi

Sohar Regional Sports Complex, Sohar, Oman
13 November 2014
19:15 UTC+4

Sohar	1 – 3	Al-Khabourah
Al-Muqbali		Doaej; Al-Buraiki; Al-Hosni

Sohar Regional Sports Complex, Sohar, Oman
19 November 2014
17:55 UTC+4

Al-Khabourah	0 - 2	Saham
		Al-Khaldi; Al-Khaldi

Al-Khabourah, Oman
19 November 2014
18:00 UTC+4

Al-Nahda	0 - 1	Sohar
		Abu Halawa (pen.)

Al-Buraimi Sports Complex, Al-Buraimi, Oman
24 November 2014
17:50 UTC+4

Al-Khabourah	1 - 1	Al-Nahda

Al-Khabourah, Oman
24 November 2014
17:50 UTC+4

Sohar	0 - 0	Saham

Sohar Regional Sports Complex, Sohar, Oman
28 December 2014
17:50 UTC+4

Al-Khabourah	0 - 2	Sohar
		Al-Muqbali 29'; Al-Balushi

Sohar Regional Sports Complex, Sohar, Oman
28 December 2014
17:55 UTC+4

Al-Nahda	0 - 0	Saham

Al-Buraimi Sports Complex, Al-Buraimi, Oman
1 January 2014
16:40 UTC+4

Sohar	1 - 0	Al-Nahda
Al-Shibli 43'

Sohar Regional Sports Complex, Sohar, Oman
5 January 2014
19:15 UTC+4

Saham	3 - 2	Al-Khabourah
Koffi 21'; Al-Sharqi; Al-Sharqi		Al-Rushaidi; Al-Rushaidi

Sohar Regional Sports Complex, Sohar, Oman
5 January 2014
18:00 UTC+4

Saham	1 - 0	Sohar
Al-Sharqi

Sohar Regional Sports Complex, Sohar, Oman
5 January 2014
18:00 UTC+4

Al-Nahda	1 - 1	Al-Khabourah
Al-Abdul Salam

Al-Buraimi Sports Complex, Al-Buraimi, Oman

=== Group C ===
Team	Pld	W	D	L	GF	GA	GD	Pts
(Oman) Al-Musannah	6	2	3	1	7	6	+1	9
(Oman) Al-Shabab	6	1	4	1	6	6	0	7
(Oman) Al-Suwaiq	6	1	3	2	5	6	−1	6

13 November 2014
16:45 UTC+4

Al-Suwaiq	0 – 1	Al-Musannah
		Jarlisson

Al-Suwaiq, Oman
19 November 2014
17:50 UTC+4

Al-Musannah	2 - 2	Al-Shabab
Al-Dhabouni; David		Al-Saadi; Lucas

Al-Seeb Stadium, Al-Seeb, Oman
24 November 2014
17:50 UTC+4

Al-Shabab	1 - 0	Al-Suwaiq
Lucas

Al-Seeb Stadium, Al-Seeb, Oman
28 December 2014
17:45 UTC+4

Al-Musannah	0 - 1	Al-Suwaiq

Al-Seeb Stadium, Al-Seeb, Oman
1 January 2014
19:15 UTC+4

Al-Shabab	0 - 1	Al-Musannah
		David

Al-Seeb Stadium, Al-Seeb, Oman
5 January 2014
19:20 UTC+4

Al-Suwaiq	1 - 1	Al-Shabab
		Lucas

Al-Seeb Stadium, Al-Seeb, Oman
9 January 2014
17:55 UTC+4

Al-Suwaiq	2 - 2	Al-Musannah
		David; David

Al-Seeb Stadium, Al-Seeb, Oman
12 January 2014
18:00 UTC+4

Al-Musannah	1 - 1	Al-Shabab
David

Al-Seeb Stadium, Al-Seeb, Oman
15 January 2014
18:00 UTC+4

Al-Shabab	1 - 1	Al-Suwaiq
Lucas 16' (pen.)		Al-Kharoosi 54'

Al-Seeb Stadium, Al-Seeb, Oman

=== Group D ===
Team	Pld	W	D	L	GF	GA	GD	Pts
(Oman) Al-Oruba	6	3	1	2	3	5	−2	10
(Oman) Fanja	6	2	2	2	5	5	0	8
(Oman) Sur	6	2	1	3	7	5	+2	7

13 November 2014
17:50 UTC+4

Fanja	0 – 0	Al-Oruba

Sultan Qaboos Sports Complex, Muscat, Oman
19 November 2014
17:45 UTC+4

Al-Oruba	1 - 0	Sur

Sur Sports Complex, Sur, Oman
24 November 2014
17:45 UTC+4

Sur	2 - 0	Fanja
Tiago; Tiago

Sur Sports Complex, Sur, Oman
28 December 2014
17:45 UTC+4

Al-Oruba	1 - 0	Fanja
Samer

Sur Sports Complex, Sur, Oman
1 January 2014
17:45 UTC+4

Sur	0 - 1	Al-Oruba
		Abdul-Hadi 45'

Sur Sports Complex, Sur, Oman
5 January 2014
17:55 UTC+4

Fanja	2 - 1	Sur
Al-Rawahi; Al-Hinaii		Tiago (pen.)

Sultan Qaboos Sports Complex, Muscat, Oman
9 January 2014
17:55 UTC+4

Fanja	2 - 0	Al-Oruba
Al-Ghassani; Al-Tamtami

Sultan Qaboos Sports Complex, Muscat, Oman
12 January 2014
17:55 UTC+4

Al-Oruba	0 - 3	Sur
		Al-Najashi; Al-Najashi; Tiago

Sur Sports Complex, Sur, Oman
15 January 2014
18:00 UTC+4

Sur	1 - 1	Fanja
Tiago		Al-Tamtami

Sur Sports Complex, Sur, Oman

== Quarter finals ==
19 January 2015
17:00 UTC+4

Saham	1 - 2	Fanja
Al-Noufali		Al-Ghassani; Al-Tamtami

Sohar Regional Sports Complex, Sohar, Oman
19 January 2015
17:00 UTC+4

Al-Musannah	1 - 4	Dhofar
Al-Hajri		Al-Saadi; Al-Soori; Al-Mushaifri; Fawaz

Al-Seeb Stadium, Al-Seeb, Oman
19 January 2015
17:00 UTC+4

Al-Oruba	0 - 2	Sohar
		Al-Hosni 24'; Koraj

Sur Sports Complex, Sur, Oman
19 January 2015
20:15 UTC+4

Al-Seeb	1 - 1	Al-Shabab
Al-Saadi		Douglas
Penalties
(penalty scored) Al-Mukhaini; (penalty scored) Al-Busaidi; (penalty scored) Al-Gheilani; (penalty missed) Al-Jalabubi; (penalty scored) Al-Rushaidi; (penalty scored) Al-Farsi; (penalty missed) Al-Dhamri	6 – 7

Al-Seeb Stadium, Al-Seeb, Oman

== Semi finals ==
24 January 2015
17:10 UTC+4

Sohar	1 - 1	Dhofar
Al-Ajmi 46'		Felix
Penalties
(penalty scored) Al-Thehli; (penalty scored) Al-Muqbali; (penalty scored) Al-Hosni; (penalty missed) Al-Kiyumi; (penalty missed) Al-Ajmi; (penalty missed) Abu Halawa	3 – 4	(penalty scored) Al-Nahar; (penalty scored) Al-Hadhri; (penalty missed) Rabea; (penalty missed) Nabil; (penalty scored) Felix; (penalty scored) Al-Rajaibi

Sohar Regional Sports Complex, Sohar, Oman
24 January 2015
19:30 UTC+4

Fanja	1 - 0	Al-Shabab
Al-Ghassani 78'

Sultan Qaboos Sports Complex, Muscat, Oman

== Finals ==
29 January 2015
18:45 UTC+4

Dhofar	1 - 1	Fanja
Al-Saadi 28'		Al-Hinai 94' (pen.)
Penalties
(penalty scored) Al-Nahar; (penalty scored) Al-Rajaibi; (penalty scored) Al-Hadhri; (penalty scored) Kouassi; (penalty missed) Sami; (penalty scored) Al-Shatri; (penalty scored) Fawaz; (penalty scored) Al-Soori; (penalty missed) Al-Sabti; (penalty missed) Al-Nahar	7 – 8	(penalty scored) Al-Ghassani; (penalty missed) Al-Hinai; (penalty scored) Al-Hasani; (penalty scored) Al-Tamtami; (penalty scored) Al-Jabri; (penalty scored) Al-Rawahi; (penalty scored) Al-Siyabi; (penalty scored) Ike; (penalty missed) Al-Hattali; (penalty scored) Al-Ghassani

Al-Seeb Stadium, Al-Seeb, Oman

== Statistics ==
As of 29 January 2015

=== Top scorers ===
Rank	Scorer	Club	Goals
1	(Brazil) Tiago Chulapa	Sur	5
1	(Brazil) David da Silva	Al-Musannah	5
2	(Brazil) Lucas Gaúcho	Al-Shabab	4
2	(Senegal) Mohamed Ablaye Gaye	Al-Nasr	4
3	(Oman) Abdulrahman Al-Ghassani	Fanja	3
3	(Oman) Azzan Al-Tamtami	Fanja	3
3	(Oman) Mazin Al-Saadi	Al-Seeb	3
3	(Oman) Mohammed Rabea	Dhofar	3
3	(Oman) Mohsin Al-Khaldi	Saham	3
3	(Oman) Mosab Al-Sharqi	Saham	3
3	(Oman) Younis Al-Mushaifri	Dhofar	3

=== Top Omani Scorers ===
Rank	Scorer	Club	Goals
1	(Oman) Abdulrahman Al-Ghassani	Fanja	3
1	(Oman) Azzan Al-Tamtami	Fanja	3
1	(Oman) Mazin Al-Saadi	Al-Seeb	3
1	(Oman) Mohammed Rabea	Dhofar	3
1	(Oman) Mohsin Al-Khaldi	Saham	3
1	(Oman) Mosab Al-Sharqi	Saham	3
1	(Oman) Younis Al-Mushaifri	Dhofar	3
2	(Oman) Hamoud Al-Saadi	Dhofar	2
2	(Oman) Khalid Al-Muqbali	Sohar	2
2	(Oman) Mohammed Saleh Al-Mukhaini	Al-Seeb	2
2	(Oman) Mohammed Al-Najashi	Sur	2
2	(Oman) Nabeeh Al-Rushaidi	Al-Khabourah	2

== See also ==
- 2014–15 Oman Professional League
- 2014–15 Sultan Qaboos Cup
