= 2013–14 Sultan Qaboos Cup =

Tournament details
- Country: Oman
- Teams: 38

Final positions
- Champions: Fanja
- Runners-up: Al-Nahda

Tournament statistics
- Matches played: 43
- Goals scored: 128 (2.98 per match)
- Top goal scorer(s): (Oman) Abdulaziz Al-Muqbali (5 goals)

The 2013–14 Sultan Qaboos Cup was the 41st edition of the Sultan Qaboos Cup (Arabic: كأس السلطان قابوس), the premier knockout tournament for football teams in Oman.

The competition began on 4 November 2013 with the qualification round and concluded on 24 May 2014. Al-Suwaiq Club were the defending champions, having won their second title in 2013. Fanja SC were crowned the champions of the 2013–14 Sultan Qaboos Cup when they defeated Al-Nahda Club 2–0, winning the title for a record ninth time.

== Teams ==
This year the tournament had 38 teams.

- Ahli Sidab Club (Sidab)
- Al-Bashaer Club
- Al-Hamra SC (Al-Hamra)
- Al-Ittifaq Club
- Al-Ittihad Club (Salalah)
- Al-Kamel Wa Al-Wafi SC
- Al-Khaboora SC (Al-Khaboora)
- Al-Mudhaibi SC (Mudhaibi)
- Al-Musannah SC (Al-Musannah)
- Al-Nahda Club (Al-Buraimi)
- Al-Nasr S.C.S.C. (Salalah)
- Al-Oruba SC (Sur)
- Al-Rustaq SC (Rustaq)
- Al-Seeb Club (Seeb)
- Al-Shabab Club (Seeb)
- Al-Suwaiq Club (Suwaiq
- Al-Tali'aa SC (Sur)
- Al-Wahda SC (Sur)
- Bahla Club (Bahla)
- Bowsher Club (Bawshar)
- Dhofar S.C.S.C. (Salalah)
- Dibba Club (Dibba Al-Baya)
- Fanja SC (Fanja)
- Ibri Club (Ibri)
- Ja'lan SC (Jalan Bani Bu Ali)
- Khasab SC (Khasab)
- Masirah SC (Majees)
- Majees SC (Majees)
- Mirbat SC (Mirbat)
- Muscat Club (Muscat)
- Nizwa Club (Nizwa)
- Oman Club (Muscat)
- Saham SC (Saham)
- Salalah SC (Salalah)
- Samail SC (Samail)
- Sohar SC (Sohar)
- Sur SC (Sur)
- Yanqul SC (Yanqul)

== Qualification round ==
12 teams played a knockout tie. 6 ties were played over one leg. The first match was played between Ahli Sidab Club and Dibba Club on 4 November 2013. Ahli Sidab Club, Al-Hamra SC, Al-Rustaq SC, Al-Bashaer Club, Bahla Club and Ja’lan SC advanced to the Round of 32 after winning their respective ties.

4 November 2013	Ahli Sidab	6 – 1	Dibba

4 November 2013	Al-Hamra	5 – 0	Khasab

4 November 2013	Al-Ittifaq	1 – 2	Al-Rustaq

4 November 2013	Al-Bashaer	3 – 2	Ibri

4 November 2013	Masirah	0 – 1	Bahla

7 November 2013	Ja’lan	2 – 1	Ahli-Sidab

== Round of 32 ==
32 teams played a knockout tie. 16 ties were played over one leg. The first match played was between Al-Kamel wa Al-Wafi SC and Oman Club on 21 November 2013. 16 teams advanced to the Round of 16.

21 November 2013	Al-Kamel wa Al-Wafi	0 – 4	Oman	Sur Sports Complex, Sur, Oman
18:00 UTC+4

21 November 2013	Nizwa	2 – 1	Samail	Nizwa Sports Complex, Nizwa, Oman
18:15 UTC+4

21 November 2013	Bowsher	1 – 0	Ja’lan	Royal Oman Police Stadium, Muscat, Oman
18:15 UTC+4

22 November 2013	Al-Ittihad	1 – 1 (4 – 2 p)	Al-Oruba	Salalah Sports Complex, Salalah, Oman
18:45 UTC+4

24 November 2013	Al-Suwaiq	1 – 2	Salalah	Al-Seeb Stadium, Al-Seeb, Al-Batinah, Oman
16:35 UTC+4

24 November 2013	Al-Shabab	0 – 0 (3 – 2 p)	Sur	Sultan Qaboos Sports Complex, Muscat, Oman
16:35 UTC+4

24 November 2013	Al-Bashaer	0 – 3	Al-Mudhaibi	Nizwa Sports Complex, Nizwa, Oman
16:35 UTC+4

24 November 2013	Al-Rustaq	2 – 1	Al-Seeb	Ibri Youth Complex, Ibri, Oman
18:15 UTC+4

24 November 2013	Al-Wahda	1 – 0	Yanqul	Sur Sports Complex, Sur, Oman
18:15 UTC+4

24 November 2013	Al-Nasr	2 – 1	Mirbat	Salalah Sports Complex, Salalah, Oman
18:30 UTC+4

24 November 2013	Muscat	2 – 0	Al-Khaboora	Al-Seeb Stadium, Al-Seeb, Al-Batinah, Oman
20:00 UTC+4

24 November 2013	Al-Hamra	0 – 4	Al-Musannah	Nizwa Sports Complex, Nizwa, Oman
20:00 UTC+4

24 November 2013	Fanja	1 – 0	Saham	Sultan Qaboos Sports Complex, Muscat, Oman
20:00 UTC+4	Cissé 90+20'

25 November 2013	Al-Nahda	6 – 0	Bahla	Ibri Youth Complex, Ibri, Oman
18:15 UTC+4

25 November 2013	Sohar	2 – 1	Al-Tali'aa	Al-Seeb Stadium, Al-Seeb, Al-Batinah, Oman
18:15 UTC+4

25 November 2013	Dhofar	2 – 1	Majees	Salalah Sports Complex, Salalah, Oman
18:30 UTC+4

== Round of 16 ==
16 teams played a knockout tie. 8 ties were played over one leg. The first match was played between Dhofar S.C.S.C. and Al-Shabab Club on 5 December 2013. 8 teams advanced to the Quarterfinals.

5 December 2013	Dhofar	4 – 0	Al-Shabab	Salalah Sports Complex, Salalah, Oman
17:10 UTC+4

5 December 2013	Nizwa	2 – 1	Oman	Nizwa Sports Complex, Nizwa, Oman
18:15 UTC+4

5 December 2013	Al-Wahda	1 – 6	Fanja	Sur Sports Complex, Sur, Oman
20:00 UTC+4

6 December 2013	Al-Nahda	3 – 1	Al-Musannah	Ibri Youth Complex, Ibri, Oman
16:45 UTC+4

6 December 2013	Al-Rustaq	1 – 2	Muscat	Ibri Youth Complex, Ibri, Oman
18:15 UTC+4

6 December 2013	Salalah	0 – 2	Al-Nasr	Salalah Sports Complex, Salalah, Oman
20:00 UTC+4

4 November 2013	Al-Ittihad	1 – 4 (a.e.t.)	Sohar	Salalah Sports Complex, Salalah, Oman
17:10 UTC+4

4 November 2013	Bowsher	2 – 1	Al-Mudhaibi	Sultan Qaboos Sports Complex, Muscat, Oman
20:00 UTC+4

== Quarterfinals ==
8 teams played a knockout tie. 4 ties were played over two legs. The first match was played between Fanja SC and Nizwa Club on 8 February 2014. Fanja SC, Dhofar S.C.S.C., Bowsher Club and Al-Nahda Club qualified for the Semifinals.

=== 1st Legs ===
8 February 2014	Fanja	2 – 0	Nizwa	Sultan Qaboos Sports Complex, Muscat, Oman
17:15 UTC+4	Cissé 72'; Al-Muqbali 90+2'

8 February 2014	Dhofar	2 – 0	Muscat	Salalah Sports Complex, Salalah, Oman
19:20 UTC+4	Al-Saadi; Dada

8 February 2014	Al-Nasr	0 – 1	Bowsher	Al-Saada Stadium, Salalah, Oman
19:20 UTC+4

8 February 2014	Sohar	1 – 4	Al-Nahda	Sohar Regional Sports Complex, Sohar, Oman
19:30 UTC+4	Al-Shibli 27'		Juma 34'; Ablaye Gaye 49'; Ouhakki 54'; Al-Sheiba 88'

=== 2nd Legs ===
28 February 2014	Muscat	0 – 2	Dhofar	Al-Seeb Stadium, Al-Seeb, Al-Batinah, Oman
19:00 UTC+4			Dada 45'; Al-Nahar 52'

1 March 2014	Nizwa	1 – 2	Fanja	Nizwa Sports Complex, Nizwa, Oman
17:30 UTC+4	Al-Salmi 37'		Al-Muqbali 16'; Al-Hinai 70'

1 March 2014	Al-Nahda	0 – 1	Sohar	Ibri Youth Complex, Ibri, Oman
18:40 UTC+4			Al-Salhi 78'

1 March 2014	Bowsher	1 – 0	Al-Nasr	Sultan Qaboos Sports Complex, Muscat, Oman
20:00 UTC+4	Al-Mahaijri 90' (pen.)

== Semifinals ==
4 teams played a knockout tie. 2 ties were played over two legs. The first match was played between Al-Nahda Club and Dhofar S.C.S.C. on 26 March 2014. Fanja SC and Al-Nahda Club qualified for the finals.

=== 1st Legs ===
26 March 2014	Al-Nahda	0 – 1	Dhofar	Sohar Regional Sports Complex, Sohar, Oman
17:35 UTC+4			Manaa 59'

26 March 2014	Bowsher	1 – 2	Fanja	Al-Seeb Stadium, Al-Seeb, Al-Batinah, Oman
20:00 UTC+4	Moghny 27'		Cissé 13', 34'

=== 2nd Legs ===
9 May 2014	Fanja	1 – 0	Bowsher	Al-Seeb Stadium, Al-Seeb, Al-Batinah, Oman
17:45 UTC+4	Al-Muqbali 60'

9 May 2014	Dhofar	3 – 4	Al-Nahda	Al-Saada Stadium, Salalah, Oman
20:15 UTC+4	Bashir 8', 25'; Saleh 59'		Ablaye Gaye 21'; Al-Farsi 27'; Juma 84'; Al-Sheiba 90+6'

== Finals ==
24 May 2014	Fanja	2 – 0	Al-Nahda	Sultan Qaboos Sports Complex, Muscat, Oman
19:30 UTC+4	Al-Muqbali 45', 73'
