= 2012–13 Sultan Qaboos Cup =

Tournament details
- Country: Oman
- Teams: 32

Final positions
- Champions: Al-Suwaiq
- Runners-up: Al-Nahda

Tournament statistics
- Matches played: 33
- Goals scored: 108 (3.27 per match)
- Top goal scorer(s): (Oman) Ali Al-Marhoon (3 goals)

The 2012–13 Sultan Qaboos Cup was the 40th edition of the Sultan Qaboos Cup (Arabic: كأس السلطان قابوس), the premier knockout tournament for football teams in Oman.

The competition began on 30 November 2012 with the Round of 32 and concluded on 26 May 2013. Dhofar S.C.S.C. were the defending champions, having won their eighth title in 2011. Al-Suwaiq Club were crowned the champions of the 2012 Sultan Qaboos Cup when they defeated Al-Nahda Club 2-0, winning the title for the third time.

== Teams ==
This year the tournament had 32 teams. The winners qualified for the 2014 AFC Cup.

- Ahli Sidab Club (Sidab)
- Al-Bashaer Club
- Al-Ittihad Club (Salalah)
- Al-Khaboora SC (Al-Khaboora)
- Al-Musannah SC (Al-Musannah)
- Al-Mudhaibi SC (Mudhaibi)
- Al-Nahda Club (Al-Buraimi)
- Al-Nasr S.C.S.C. (Salalah)
- Al-Oruba SC (Sur)
- Al-Rustaq SC (Rustaq)
- Al-Salam SC (Sohar)
- Al-Seeb Club (Seeb)
- Al-Shabab Club (Seeb)
- Al-Suwaiq Club (Suwaiq
- Al-Tali'aa SC (Sur)
- Al-Wahda SC (Sur)
- Bahla Club (Bahla)
- Bidia SC (Bidiya)
- Bowsher Club (Bawshar)
- Dhofar S.C.S.C. (Salalah)
- Fanja SC (Fanja)
- Majees SC (Majees)
- Mirbat SC (Mirbat)
- Muscat Club (Muscat)
- Nizwa Club (Nizwa)
- Oman Club (Muscat)
- Saham SC (Saham)
- Salalah SC (Salalah)
- Samail SC (Samail)
- Sohar SC (Sohar)
- Sur SC (Sur)
- Yanqul SC (Yanqul)

== Round of 32 ==
32 teams played a knockout tie. 16 ties were played over one leg. The first match played was between Fanja SC and Al-Nahda Club on 30 November 2012. 16 teams advanced to the Round of 16.

30 November 2012	Fanja	1 – 2	Al-Nahda	Royal Oman Police Stadium, Muscat, Oman
16:35 UTC+4	Cissé 26' (pen.)		Al-Mashaikhi 32'; Al-Jabri 82'

30 November 2012	Al-Oruba	4 – 0	Yanqul	Sur Sports Complex, Sur, Oman
18:15 UTC+4	Lorinko 34', 65'; Al-Farsi 61'; Al-Farsi 63'

30 November 2012	Al-Ittihad	1 – 2	Al-Seeb	Al-Saada Stadium, Salalah, Oman
18:45 UTC+4	Eid 9'		Al-Nofali 38'; Al-Hasani 68'

30 November 2012	Muscat	1 – 5	Al-Shabab	Royal Oman Police Stadium, Muscat, Oman
19:15 UTC+4	Mammado 35'		Al-Muqbali 24', 66'; Ouganna 43'; Shaaban 68'; Al-Alawi 88'

1 December 2012	Ahli Sidab	1 – 1 (2 – 4 p)	Al-Khaboora	Al-Seeb Stadium, Al-Seeb, Al-Batinah, Oman
16:35 UTC+4

1 December 2012	Al-Tali'aa	3 – 2	Bahla	Sur Sports Complex, Sur, Oman
18:15 UTC+4

1 December 2012	Sohar	1 – 4	Al-Nasr	Sohar Regional Sports Complex, Sohar, Oman
18:15 UTC+4	Al-Muqbali 8'		Al-Shamsi 6'; Thuwaini 19'; Al-Sumain 68'; Gairon 75'

1 December 2012	Bidia	1 – 4	Sur	Nizwa Sports Complex, Nizwa, Oman
18:15 UTC+4

1 December 2012	Bowsher	3 – 0	Al-Rustaq	Royal Oman Police Stadium, Muscat, Oman
18:15 UTC+4

1 December 2012	Al-Suwaiq	2 – 1	Saham	Al-Seeb Stadium, Al-Seeb, Al-Batinah, Oman
19:15 UTC+4	Al-Noufali 90+13'; Al-Saadi 90+30'		Hadid 90+30'

2 December 2012	Oman	0 – 1	Samail	Royal Oman Police Stadium, Muscat, Oman
16:35 UTC+4

2 December 2012	Al-Mudhaibi	1 – 1 (5 – 4 p)	Mirbat	Nizwa Sports Complex, Nizwa, Oman
16:40 UTC+4

2 December 2012	Salalah	3 – 1	Al-Wahda	Al-Saada Stadium, Salalah, Oman
17:05 UTC+4	Ali Al-Marhoon 35', 50', 78'		Mundhir Al-Sunaidi 90'

2 December 2012	Al-Salam	1 – 0	Majees	Sohar Regional Sports Complex, Sohar, Oman
18:15 UTC+4	Al-Makhmari 90'

2 December 2012	Al-Bashaer	1 – 5	Dhofar	Nizwa Sports Complex, Nizwa, Oman
19:15 UTC+4	Majid		Basin; Al-Saadi; Al-Dhabit; Ablaye Gaye; Manaa

2 December 2012	Al-Musannah	0 – 0 (3 – 1 p)	Nizwa	Royal Oman Police Stadium, Muscat, Oman
19:30 UTC+4

== Round of 16 ==
16 teams played a knockout tie. 8 ties were played over one leg. The first match was played between Al-Salam SC and Bowsher Club on 24 December 2012. 8 teams advanced to the Quarterfinals.

24 December 2012	Al-Salam	2 – 0	Bowsher	Sohar Regional Sports Complex, Sohar, Oman
18:20 UTC+4

25 December 2012	Al-Oruba	1 – 0	Samail	Sur Sports Complex, Sur, Oman
16:40 UTC+4

25 December 2012	Al-Nasr	1 – 2	Al-Suwaiq	Al-Saada Stadium, Salalah, Oman
17:10 UTC+4

25 December 2012	Al-Khaboora	0 – 1	Al-Nahda	Sohar Regional Sports Complex, Sohar, Oman
18:20 UTC+4

25 December 2012	Al-Mudhaibi	2 – 3	Al-Shabab	Nizwa Sports Complex, Nizwa, Oman
18:20 UTC+4	Dhahir 61', 65'		Al-Siyabi 19'; Ouganna 20'; Saleh 40'

25 December 2012	Al-Tali'aa	3 – 2	Al-Seeb	Sur Sports Complex, Sur, Oman
19:30 UTC+4

25 December 2012	Dhofar	3 – 2	Al-Musannah	Al-Saada Stadium, Salalah, Oman
20:15 UTC+4	Ashoor 7'; Fahad Naseeb 43'; Faraj 82'		Al-Saadi 85'; Hamza 90+2'

26 December 2012	Salalah	1 – 1 (4 – 2 p)	Sur	Al-Saada Stadium, Salalah, Oman
18:45 UTC+4

== Quarterfinals ==
8 teams played a knockout tie. 4 ties were played over one leg. The first match was played between Al-Oruba SC and Al-Tali'aa SC on 25 February 2013. Al-Oruba SC, Al-Nahda Club, Dhofar S.C.S.C. and Al-Suwaiq Club qualified for the Semifinals.

25 February 2013	Al-Oruba	3 – 2	Al-Tali'aa	Sur Sports Complex, Sur, Oman
17:15 UTC+4	Abdul-Hadi 55', 65'; Raed Ibrahim 90+25'		Eid 36'; Obeida 61'

25 February 2013	Al-Salam	1 – 4	Al-Nahda	Sohar Regional Sports Complex, Sohar, Oman
19:00 UTC+4	Al-Shamsi 47'		Ablaye Gaye 23'; Al-Nuaimi 45'; Rashid 54', 90'

25 February 2013	Salalah	0 – 5	Dhofar	Al-Saada Stadium, Salalah, Oman
20:00 UTC+4			Ayil 40' (pen.); Al-Hadhri 45', 56'; Temsah 84', 90'

8 March 2013	Al-Shabab	2 – 2 (5 – 6 p)	Al-Suwaiq	Sultan Qaboos Sports Complex, Muscat, Oman
19:00 UTC+4	Al-Siyabi 53' (pen.); Jaber Al-Owaisi 90'		Al-Jalabubi 35'; Al-Saadi 64'

== Semifinals ==
4 teams played a knockout tie. 2 ties were played over two legs. The first match was played between Al-Suwaiq Club and Al-Oruba SC on 16 April 2013. Al-Suwaiq Club and Al-Nahda Club qualified for the Finals.

=== 1st Legs ===
16 April 2013	Al-Suwaiq	3 – 0	Al-Oruba	Al-Seeb Stadium, Al-Seeb, Al-Batinah, Oman
19:30 UTC+4	Rabia 5'; Al-Ghassani 45'; Al-Saadi 90'

17 April 2013	Al-Nahda	1 – 0	Dhofar	Sohar Regional Sports Complex, Sohar, Oman
19:30 UTC+4

=== 2nd Legs ===
4 May 2013	Al-Oruba	1 – 0	Al-Suwaiq	Sur Sports Complex, Sur, Oman
19:30 UTC+4	Al-Gheilani 26'

5 May 2013	Dhofar	3 – 2	Al-Nahda	Al-Saada Stadium, Salalah, Oman
19:30 UTC+4	Joël 38', 80'; Darwish 52'		Ablaye Gaye 35'; Juma 44'

== Finals ==
26 May 2013	Al-Suwaiq	2 – 0	Al-Nahda	Sohar Regional Sports Complex, Sohar, Oman
18:30 UTC+4	Al-Ghassani 52'; Rabia 70'
