= Vítor Huvos =

Brazilian footballer (born 1988)

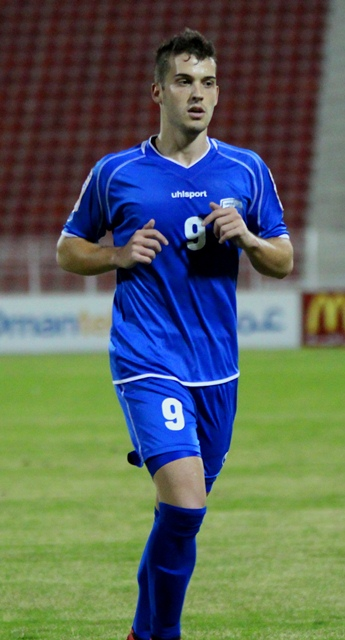
- Vítor Huvos, Brazilian footballer

Personal information
- Full name: Vítor Gialorenco Huvos
- Date of birth: 8 July 1988 (age 38)
- Place of birth: São Paulo, Brazil
- Height: 1.81 m (5 ft 11 in)
- Position: Attacking midfielder

Youth career
- 2005–2007: Atlético Clube Juventus

Senior career*
| Years | Team | Apps | (Gls) |
| 2007–2008 | Atlético Clube Juventus | 0 | (0) |
| 2008–2009 | Grasshopper | 8 | (1) |
| 2009 | → Stade Nyonnais (loan) | 9 | (0) |
| 2009–2010 | Universitatea Cluj | 22 | (7) |
| 2010–2011 | Atlético Madrid B | 12 | (0) |
| 2012 | Botafogo-SP | 0 | (0) |
| 2012–2013 | Chainat | 14 | (7) |
| 2014–2015 | Saham | 14 | (2) |
| 2016–2017 | Bahrain | 9 | (3) |
- * Club domestic league appearances and goals

Vítor Gialorenco Huvos (born 8 July 1988), commonly known as Vítor Huvos, is a retired Brazilian footballer.

== Personal life ==
On 10 October 2007, he received his Italian passport and hence he shares dual-citizenship between Brazil and Italy.

== Club career ==
=== Brazil ===
Huvos began his professional career in Brazil with his parent club Atlético Clube Juventus. He did not make any official appearance for the club though in his one-year spell with the Rio Branco-based club.

=== Switzerland ===
Just after spending a year with his first professional club in his home country, he moved to Europe and more accurately to Switzerland where he signed a one-year contract with Swiss Super League club Grasshopper Club Zürich. He made 8 league appearances and scored one goal for the Zürich-based club, hence helping them to secure the 4th position in the 2008–09 Swiss Super League. During his one-year spell with the club, he also moved on-loan to Swiss Challenge League club FC Stade Nyonnais for whom he made 9 league appearances.

=== Romania ===
In 2009, he moved to another European country and this time to Romania where he signed a one-year contract with Liga II club FC Universitatea Cluj. He made 22 appearances and scored 7 goals for the club in the 2009–10 Liga II, helping them to secure the 2nd position in the 2009–10 Liga II hence earning them a place in the 2010–11 Liga I.

=== Spain ===
On 1 September 2010, he signed as a free agent for Segunda División B club Atlético Madrid B from the Romanian club FC Universitatea Cluj. He made his debut for the Madrid-based club on 26 September 2010 in a 2–1 loss against UD Vecindario. He made 12 appearances for the club in the 2010–11 Segunda División B.

=== Back to Brazil ===
In 2012, he came back to Brazil after a five-year-long spell in Europe and signed a short-term contract with Botafogo Futebol Clube. He did not make any appearance for the club in the 2012 Campeonato Paulista but he represented the team as a substitute on 22 January 2012 in a 4–0 loss against São Paulo FC.

=== Thailand ===
In 2013, he again made a far away from his nation Brazil to Thailand where he signed a one-year contract with Thai Premier League club Chainat Hornbill F.C. He made 14 appearances and scored 7 goals for the Chainat-based club in the 2013 Thai Premier League, hence helping them secure the 10th position in the 2013 Thai Premier League.

=== Oman ===
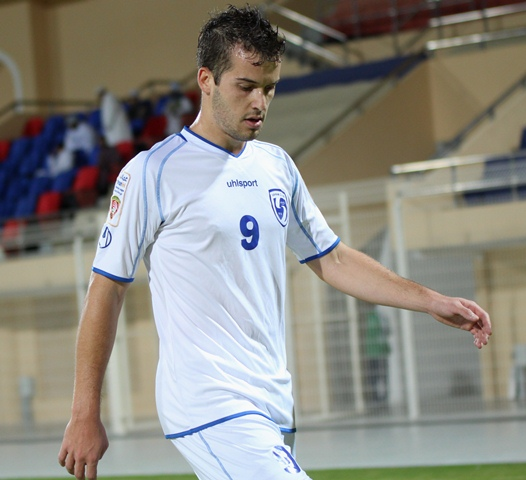
Vítor Huvos - 2014-15 Oman Professional League

Saham SC

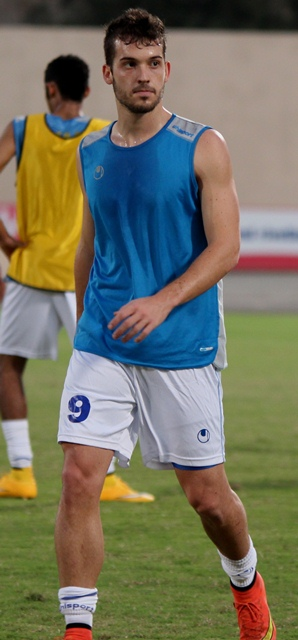

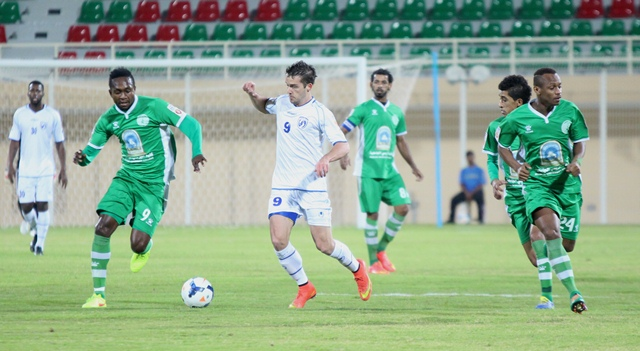

On 1 September 2014, he signed a one-year contract with 2014 GCC Champions League runners-up Saham Club. He made his Oman Professional League debut and scored his first goal on 13 September 2014 in a 3–0 win over Al-Oruba SC. He made his Sultan Qaboos Cup debut on 1 December 2014 in a 3–0 win over Masirah SC. He also made his Oman Professional League Cup debut and scored his first goal in the competition on 13 November 2014 in a 3–1 win over 2013-14 Oman Professional League winners, Al-Nahda Club. He scored 2 goals in 11 appearances in the 2014-15 Oman Professional League. He also scored 2 goals in 6 appearances in the 2014–15 Oman Professional League Cup and helped his side advance to the Quarter-finals stage of the competition where his side narrowly lost 2–1 to 2013–14 Sultan Qaboos Cup winners, Fanja SC.

On 18 August 2015, he signed a one-year contract extension with the Saham-based club. He made his first appearance in the 2015-16 Oman Professional League on 14 September 2015 in a 2–1 win over Al-Khaboura SC. After the match against Al-Shabab Club on 21 September 2015, the club management decided to part company with the Italian footballer of Brazilian origin.

=== Bahrain ===
In January 2016, he again made a move to the Middle East and this time to the Kingdom of Bahrain where he signed a six-month contract with Bahraini Second Division club Bahrain SC.

=== Club career statistics ===
| Club | Season | Division | League | | Cup | | Continental | | Other | | Total | |
| Club | Season | Division | Apps | Goals | Apps | Goals | Apps | Goals | Apps | Goals | Apps | Goals |
|---|---|---|---|---|---|---|---|---|---|---|---|---|
| Grasshopper | 2008–09 | Swiss Super League | 8 | 1 | 0 | 0 | 0 | 0 | 0 | 0 | 8 | 1 |
| Grasshopper | Total | | 8 | 1 | 0 | 0 | 0 | 0 | 0 | 0 | 8 | 1 |
| Stade Nyonnais | 2008-09 | Swiss Challenge League | 9 | 0 | 0 | 0 | 0 | 0 | 0 | 0 | 9 | 0 |
| Stade Nyonnais | Total | | 9 | 0 | 0 | 0 | 0 | 0 | 0 | 0 | 9 | 0 |
| Universitatea Cluj | 2009-10 | Liga II | 22 | 7 | 0 | 0 | 0 | 0 | 0 | 0 | 22 | 7 |
| Universitatea Cluj | Total | | 22 | 7 | 0 | 0 | 0 | 0 | 0 | 0 | 22 | 7 |
| Atlético Madrid B | 2010–11 | Segunda División B | 12 | 0 | 0 | 0 | 0 | 0 | 0 | 0 | 12 | 0 |
| Atlético Madrid B | Total | | 12 | 0 | 0 | 0 | 0 | 0 | 0 | 0 | 12 | 0 |
| Chainat | 2013 | Thai Premier League | 14 | 7 | 0 | 0 | 0 | 0 | 0 | 0 | 14 | 7 |
| Chainat | Total | | 14 | 7 | 0 | 0 | 0 | 0 | 0 | 0 | 14 | 7 |
| Saham | 2014–15 | Oman Professional League | 11 | 2 | 7 | 2 | 0 | 0 | 0 | 0 | 18 | 4 |
| Saham | 2015–16 | Oman Professional League | 3 | 0 | 0 | 0 | 0 | 0 | 0 | 0 | 3 | 0 |
| Saham | Total | | 14 | 2 | 7 | 2 | 0 | 0 | 0 | 0 | 21 | 4 |
| Bahrain | 2016–17 | Bahrain Second Division | 9 | 3 | 8 | 6 | 0 | 0 | 0 | 0 | 17 | 9 |
| Bahrain | Total | | 9 | 3 | 8 | 6 | 0 | 0 | 0 | 0 | 17 | 9 |
| Career total | | | 88 | 20 | 15 | 8 | 0 | 0 | 0 | 0 | 103 | 28 |
