= Mouhamed Ablaye Gaye =

Senegalese footballer (born 1983)

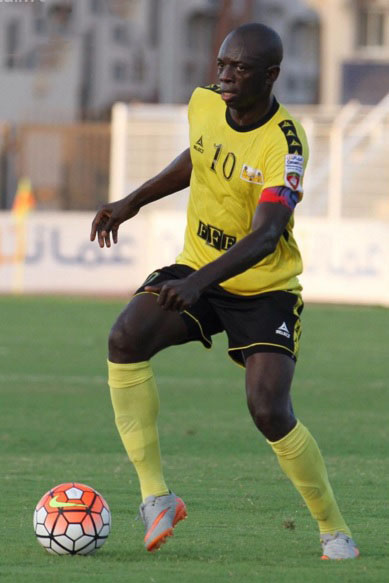
- Mouhamed Ablaye Gaye, Senegalese footballer

Personal information
- Date of birth: 11 January 1983 (age 43)
- Place of birth: Dakar, Senegal
- Height: 1.80 m (5 ft 11 in)
- Position: Attacking midfielder

Team information
- Current team: Al-Suwaiq
- Number: 10

Youth career
- 1995–2000: Training Centre Normandie

Senior career*
Years	Team	Apps	(Gls)
2000–2005	Africain	?	(?)
2005–2006	Marsa	?	(?)
2006–2007	Al Urooba	?	(?)
2007–2008	Zarzis	?	(?)
2008–2009	Al Hamriyah Club	?	(?)
2009–2011	Masfut Club	?	(?)
2011–2012	Al-Suwaiq	?	(4)
2012	Dhofar	?	(3)
2013–2014	Al-Nahda	?	(17)
2014–2015	Al-Nasr	10	(8)
2015–	Al-Suwaiq	6	(2)
- * Club domestic league appearances and goals

Mouhamed Ablaye Gaye (born 11 January 1983), commonly known as Aflaye or Abo Bobo, is a Senegalese footballer who plays for Al-Suwaiq Club in Oman Professional League.

== Club career ==
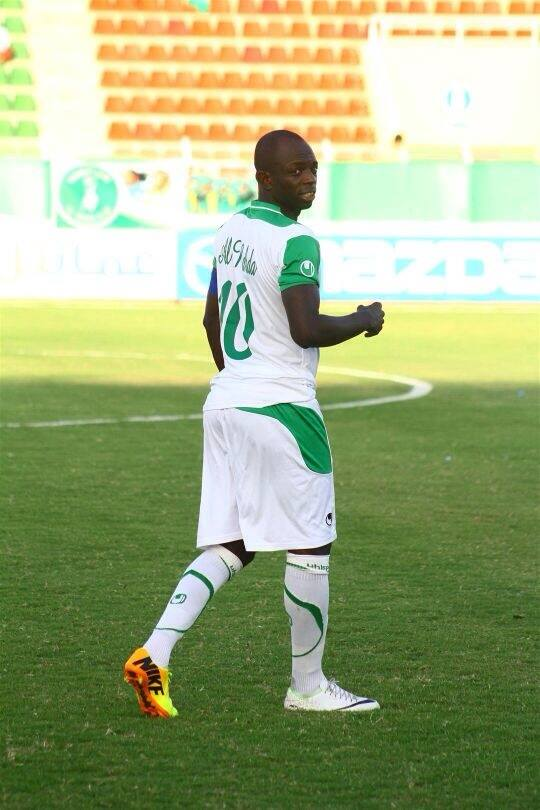
Mouhamed Ablaye Gaye - 2013–14 Oman Professional League

=== Africain ===
Mouhamed began his professional career in 2000 with Club Africain of Tunisia. In the five years he spent at the Tunis-based club he helped his team to reach the finals of the Tunisian Cup in 2003.

=== Marsa ===
After spending a long five-years spell at the Tunis-based club he moved to La Marsa, a coastal town near Tunis where he signed a one-year contract with AS Marsa. He again helped his Tunisian club to reach the finals of the Tunisian Cup in 2006.

=== Al-Urooba ===
In 2006, he moved to the United Arab Emirates and signed a one-year contract with Al-Urooba Club of UAE First Division.

=== Zarzis ===
In 2007, he came back to Tunisia and signed a one-year contract with ES Zarzis.

=== Al-Hamriyah ===
In 2008, he came back to the United Arab Emirates and signed a one-year contract with another UAE First Division club, Al-Hamriyah.

=== Masfoot ===
After a short one-year spell with Al-Hamriyah, he signed a one-year contract with another UAE First Division club, Masfoot.

=== Al-Suwaiq ===
In 2011, he moved to Oman and signed a one-year contract with Al-Suwaiq Club. He scored 4 goals in 2011–12 Oman Elite League. He made his AFC Cup debut on 6 March 2012 in a 2-0 loss against Kuwaiti side Al-Qadsia and scored his first goal in the competition 11 April 2012 in a 2-0 win over Syrian side, Al-Ittihad SC Aleppo. He scored 2 goals in 6 appearances in the 2012 AFC Cup for the Al-Suwaiq-based club.

=== Dhofar ===
At the end of the 2011–12 season, he moved to Salalah and signed a six-months contract with Dhofar S.C.S.C. He scored 3 goals in the 2012–13 Oman Elite League.

=== Al-Nahda ===
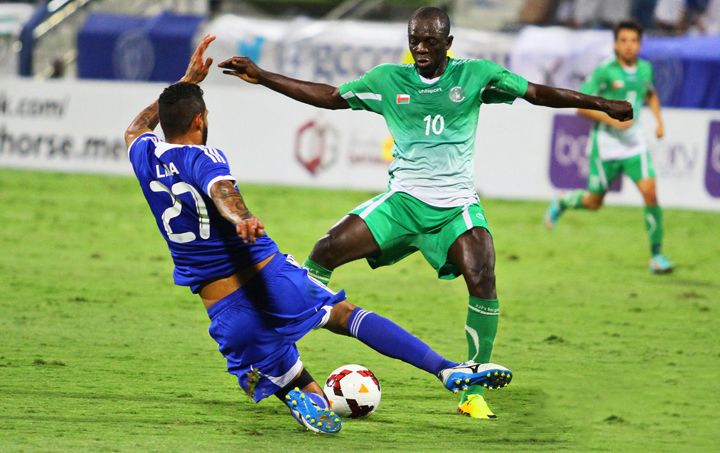
Mouhamed Ablaye Gaye - 2014 GCC Champions League

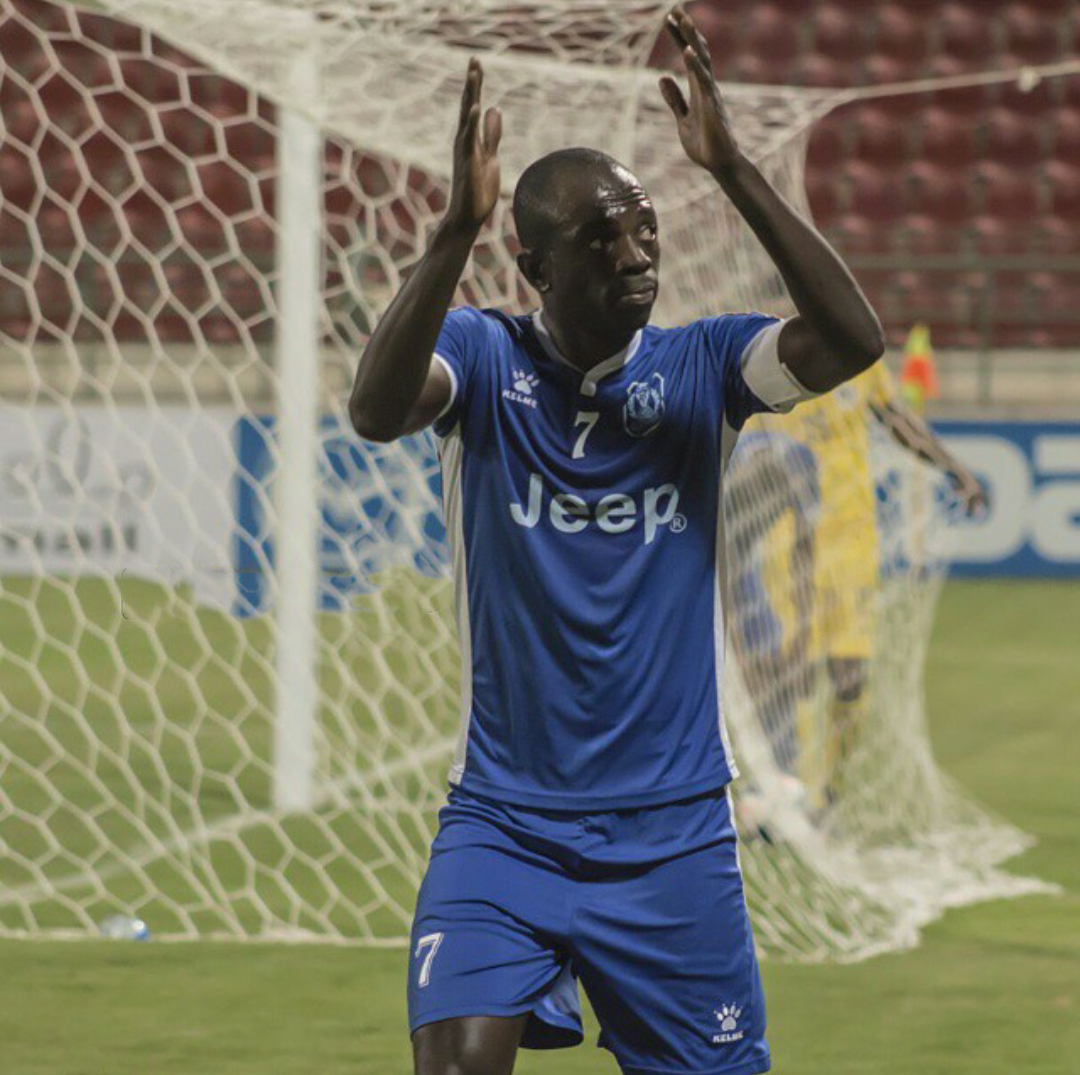
Mouhamed Ablaye Gaye - 2014–15 Sultan Qaboos Cup

In January 2013, he signed a six-month contract with Al-Nahda Club. He scored 4 goals for the club in the 2012–13 Oman Elite League and 3 goals in the 2012 Sultan Qaboos Cup. At the end of the 2012-13 season, he signed a one-year contract extension with the Al-Buraimi-based club. He scored 13 goals in 22 appearances in the 2013–14 Oman Professional League, 2 goals in 5 appearances in the 2013 Sultan Qaboos Cup. He also made his debut in the GCC Champions League on 3 March 2014 in a 1-1 draw against Kuwaiti side, Al-Nasr SC and scored his first goal in the competition on 12 March 2014 in a 2-0 win over Qatari side, Al-Kharaitiyat SC. He scored 1 goal in 6 appearances in the 2014 GCC Champions League. He finished as the second top-scorer of the 2013-14 Oman Professional League, with his team mate, Juma Saeed along with Al-Suwaiq Club's Mohammed Al-Ghassani leading the top scorer chart with 16 goals each. He helped his club to win the 2013-14 Oman Professional League, achieve the runners-up place in the 2013 Sultan Qaboos Cup and reach the semi-finals of the 2014 GCC Champions League.

=== Al-Nasr ===
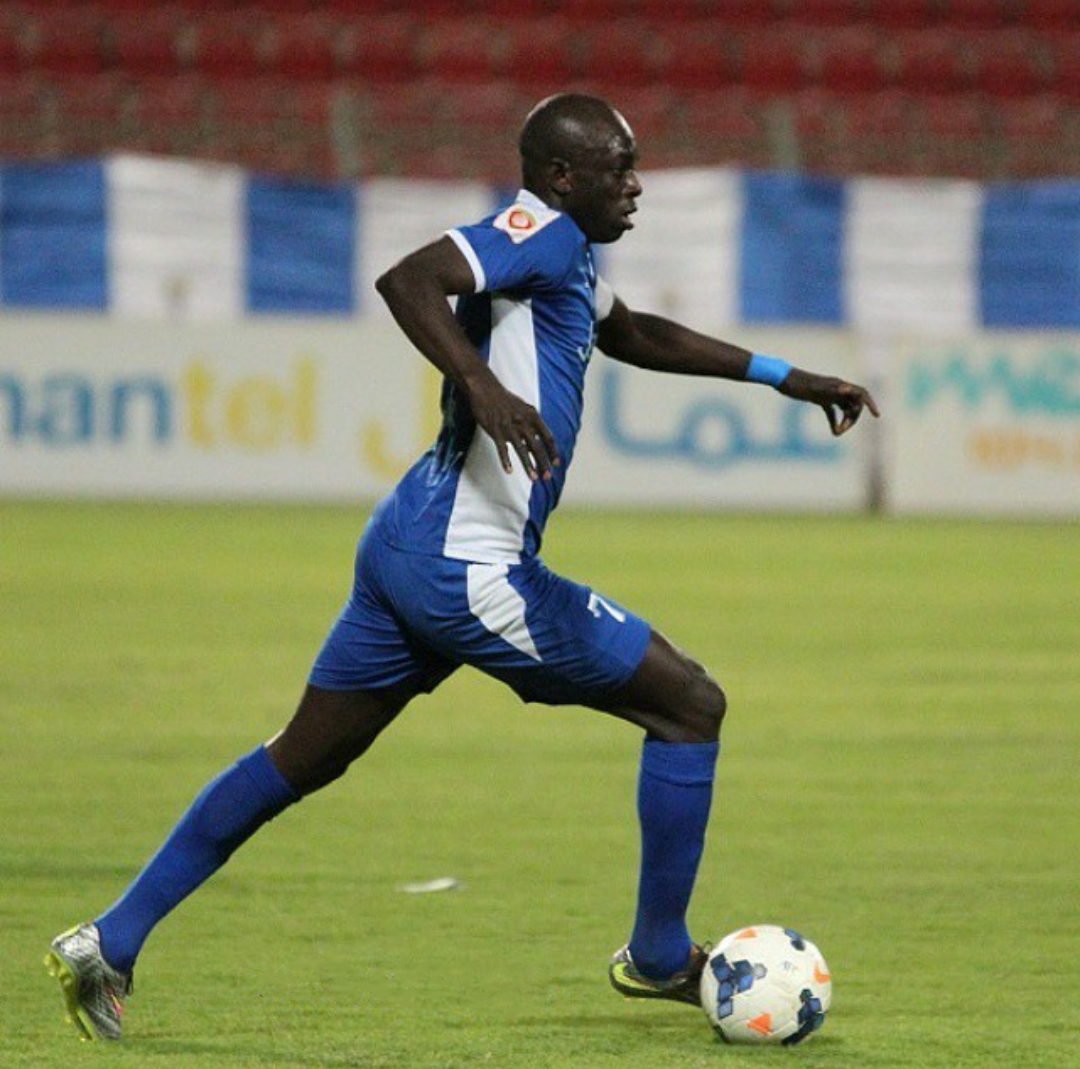
Mouhamed Ablaye Gaye - 2014–15 Oman Professional League

Al-Nasr S.C.S.C.

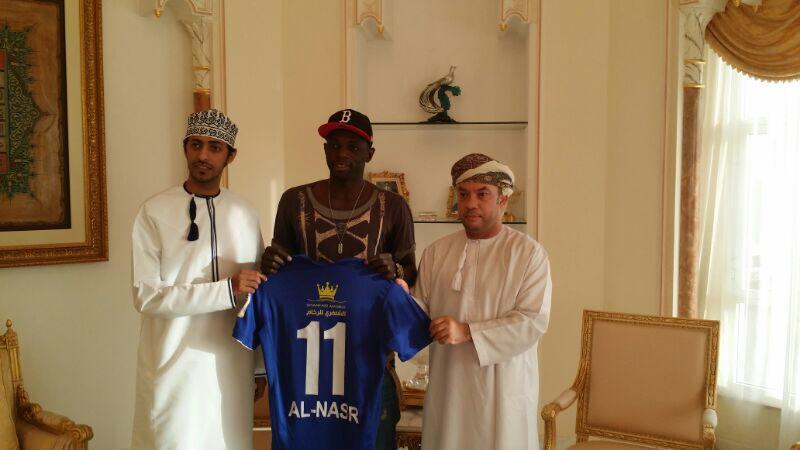
Al-Nasr S.C.S.C.

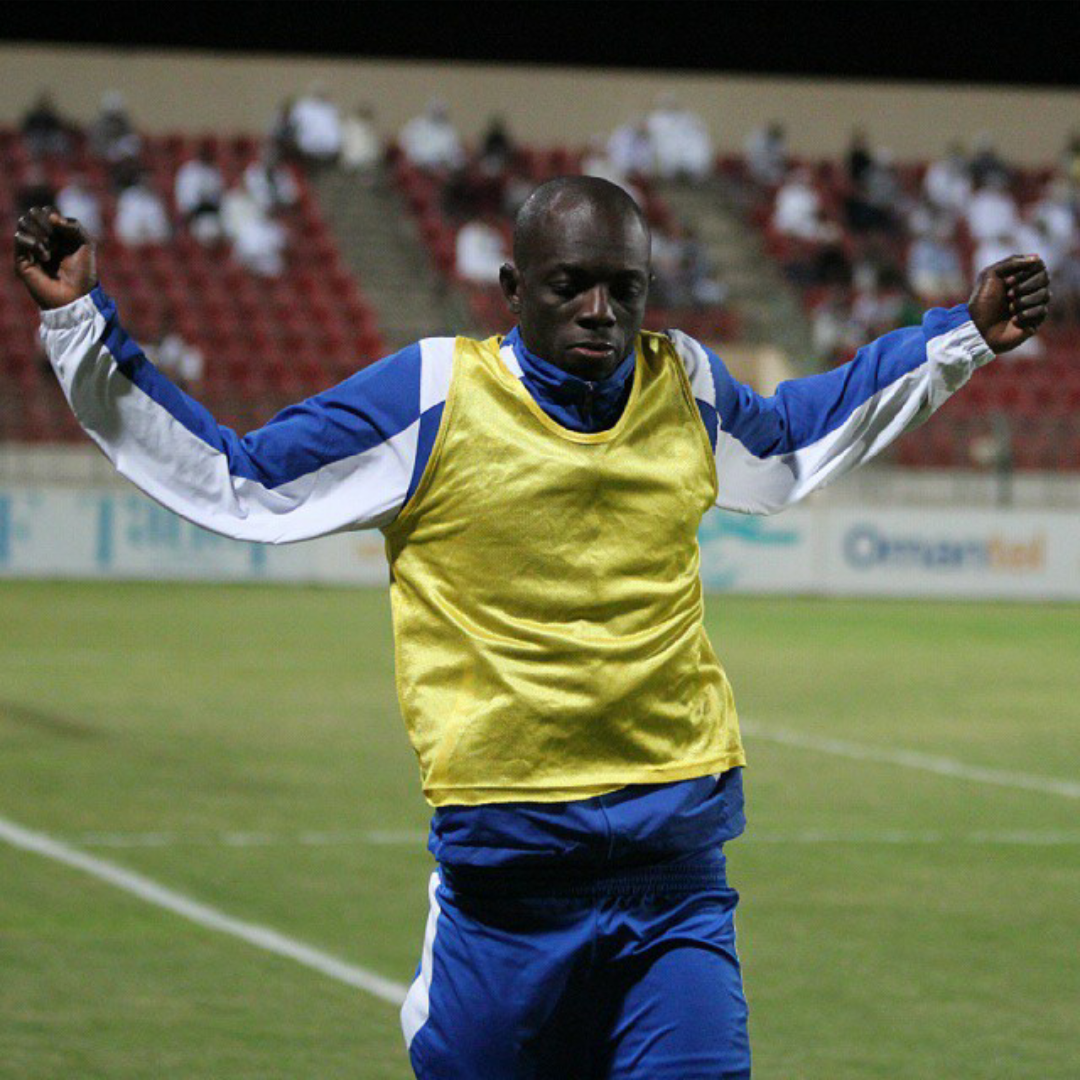
2014–15 Sultan Qaboos Cup

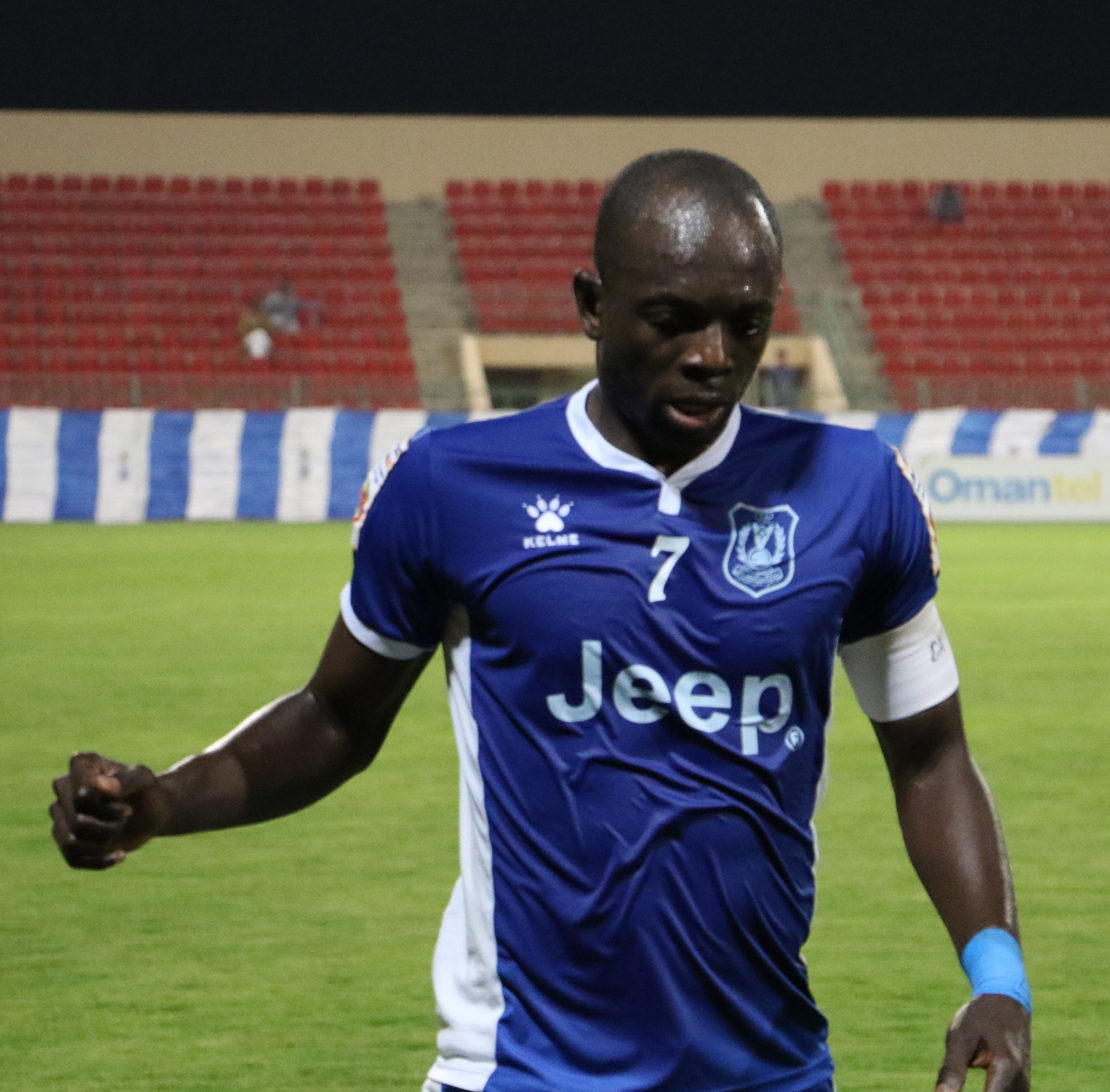
2014–15 Oman Professional League

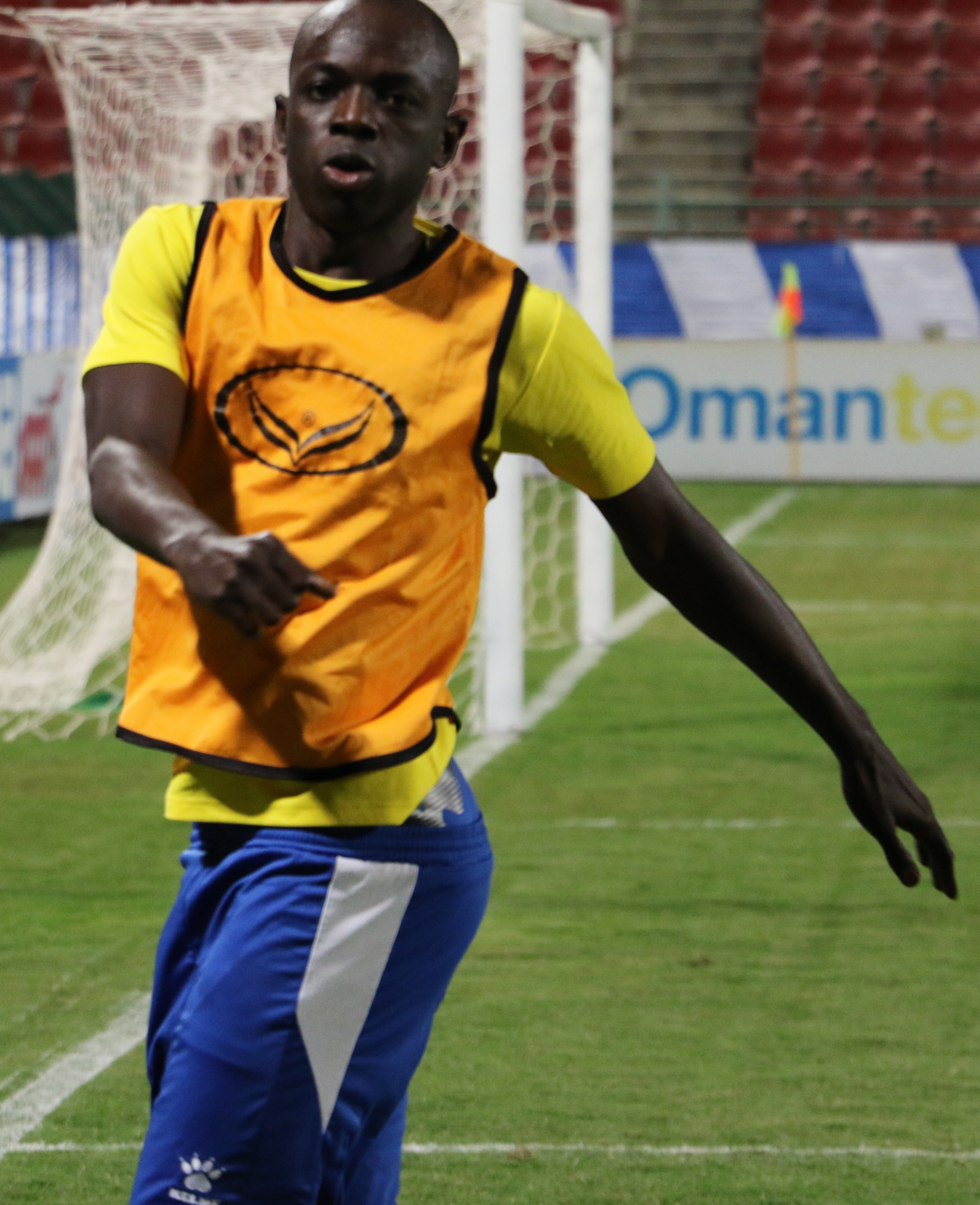
Training

On 11 June 2014, he moved back to Salalah and signed a one-year contract with rivals of his former club Dhofar S.C.S.C., Al-Nasr S.C.S.C. He made his debut for the Salalah-based club on 11 September 2014 in a 1-1 draw against Sohar SC. His highlight of the 2014–15 Oman Professional League season was a brace in a 3-0 victory over fierce rivals and his former club, Dhofar S.C.S.C. in a match that is also famous as the Oman Derby. Both the goals came from free-kicks in the 2nd half as the Senegalese swirled the ball past Dhofar's goalkeeper and Omani international, Hani Al-Sabti.

=== Back to Al-Suwaiq ===
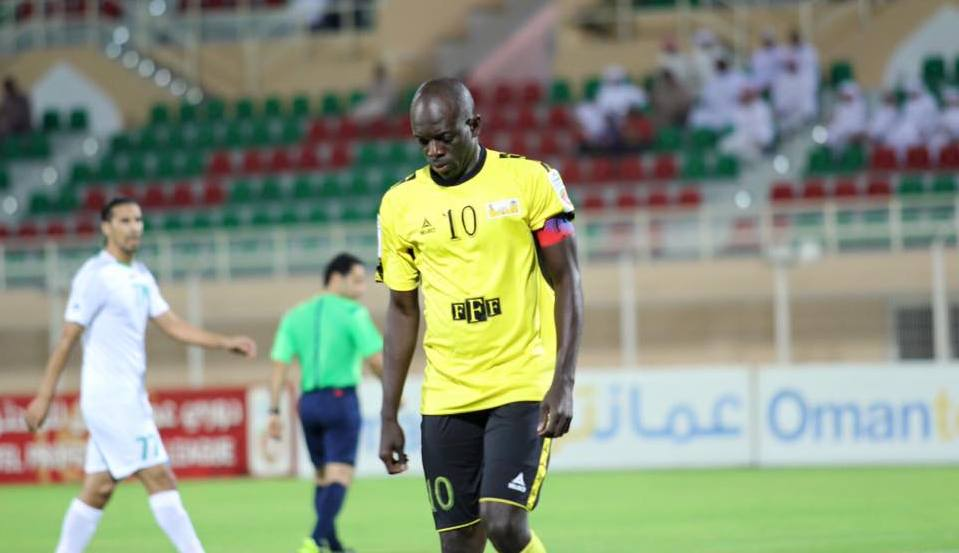
Mouhamed Ablaye Gaye - 2015–16 Oman Professional League

On 26 July 2015, he signed a one-year contract with his first and foremost club in Oman, Al-Suwaiq Club and thus he was unveiled as the first professional signing of the club for the 2015–16 Oman Professional League. He made his first appearance and scored his first goal in the 2015-16 Oman Professional League on 13 September 2015 in a 2-1 win over his former club, Al-Nasr S.C.S.C. as he converted the spot kick into a goal against Al-Nasr's Omani international goalkeeper, Faiz Al-Rushaidi.

=== Club career statistics ===
Club	Season	Division	League		Cup		Continental (Note: Includes goals and appearances in the AFC Cup)		Other		Total	
Club	Season	Division	Apps	Goals	Apps	Goals	Apps	Goals	Apps	Goals	Apps	Goals
Al-Suwaiq	2011–12	Oman Elite League	-	4	-	0	6	2	0	0	-	6
Al-Suwaiq	Total		-	4	-	0	6	2	0	0	-	6
Dhofar	2012-13	Oman Elite League	-	3	-	1	0	0	0	0	-	4
Dhofar	Total		-	3	-	1	0	0	0	0	-	4
Al-Nahda	2012-13	Oman Elite League	-	4	-	2	0	0	0	0	-	6
Al-Nahda	2013–14	Oman Elite League	22	13	5	2	0	0	6	1	33	16
Al-Nahda	Total		-	17	-	4	0	0	6	1	-	22
Al-Nasr	2014–15	Oman Professional League	24	8	11	5	0	0	0	0	35	13
Al-Nasr	Total		24	8	11	5	0	0	0	0	35	13
Al-Suwaiq	2015–16	Oman Professional League	6	2	2	1	0	0	0	0	8	3
Al-Suwaiq	Total		6	2	2	1	0	0	0	0	8	3
Career total			-	34	-	11	6	2	6	1	-	48

== Honours ==
Club Africain

- Tunisian Cup runner-up: 2003, 2006

Al-Suwaiq

- Oman Super Cup runner-up: 2011

Al-Nahda

- Oman Professional League: 2013–14
- Sultan Qaboos Cup runner-up 2012–13, 2013–14
