= Younis Al-Mushaifri =

Omani footballer (born 1981)

Personal information
- Full name: Younis Khalifa Al-Mushaifri
- Date of birth: 24 October 1981 (age 45)
- Place of birth: Al-Suwaiq, Oman
- Height: 1.78 m (5 ft 10 in)
- Position: Striker

Youth career
- 1995–1998: Al-Suwaiq

Senior career*
Years	Team	Apps	(Gls)
1999–2005	Al-Musannah	?	(0)
2005–2006	Al-Tadamun	?	(12)
2006–2009	Kazma	?	(23)
2009–2011	Al-Shabab	?	(7)
2011–2013	Fanja	?	(10)
2013–2014	Al-Shabab	?	(10)
2014–2015	Dhofar		
2015–2017	Al-Shabab		
2017–2018	Al-Nasr		
2018–2021	Al-Seeb		

International career
2006–2013	Oman	4	(0)
- * Club domestic league appearances and goals

Younis Khalifa Al-Mushaifri (Arabic: يونس خليفة المشيفري; born 24 October 1981), commonly known as Younis Al-Mushaifri, is an Omani footballer and a former Volleyball player.

== Volleyball career ==
Younis took a break from football after playing for Al-Suwaiq Club's junior teams in 1998 and became a volleyball player. In 1998, he signed a long-term contract with Al-Shabab Club to represent the club in the various top level volleyball leagues in the region.

== Club career ==
On 27 July 2013, he signed a one-year contract with Al-Shabab Club. On 14 July 2014, he signed a one-year contract with Dhofar S.C.S.C. Afterwards, he returned to Al-Shabab.

=== Club career statistics ===
Club	Season	Division	League		Cup		Continental (Note: Includes appearances in the AFC Cup)		Other (Note: Includes goals in the Arab Champions League and Club Friendlies)		Total	
Club	Season	Division	Apps	Goals	Apps	Goals	Apps	Goals	Apps	Goals	Apps	Goals
Al-Tadamun	2005–06	Kuwaiti Premier League	-	9	-	3	0	0	-	0	-	12
Al-Tadamun	Total		-	9	-	3	0	0	-	0	-	12
Kazma	2006–07	Kuwaiti Premier League	-	5	-	3	0	0	-	3	-	11
Kazma	2007–08	Kuwaiti Premier League	-	3	-	2	0	0	-	2	-	7
Kazma	2008–09	Kuwaiti Premier League	-	1	-	4	0	0	-	0	-	5
Kazma	Total		-	9	-	9	0	0	-	5	-	23
Al-Shabab	2010–11	Omani League	-	6	-	1	0	0	-	0	-	7
Al-Shabab	Total		-	6	-	1	0	0	-	0	-	7
Fanja	2011–12	Oman Elite League	-	2	-	0	0	0	-	0	-	2
Fanja	2012–13	Oman Elite League	-	4	-	4	4	0	-	0	-	8
Fanja	Total		-	6	-	4	4	0	-	0	-	10
Al-Shabab	2013–14	Oman Professional League	-	10	-	0	0	0	-	0	-	10
Al-Shabab	Total		-	10	-	0	0	0	-	0	-	10
Career total			-	40	-	17	4	0	-	5	-	62

== International career ==
Younis was selected for the national team for the first time in 2006. He has made appearances in the 2007 AFC Asian Cup qualification, the 2007 AFC Asian Cup and the 2010 FIFA World Cup qualification.

== Honours ==
=== Club ===
- With Dhofar

- Oman Professional League Cup (0): Runner-up 2014–15
- Baniyas SC International Tournament (1): Winner 2014
