= Ali Salim Al-Nahar =

Omani footballer (born 1992)

Personal information
- Full name: Ali Salim Obaid Bait Al-Nahar
- Date of birth: 21 August 1992 (age 34)
- Place of birth: Salalah, Oman
- Height: 1.65 m (5 ft 5 in)
- Position: Left-back

Team information
- Current team: Dhofar
- Number: 8

Youth career
- 2005–2010: Dhofar

Senior career*
Years	Team	Apps	(Gls)
2010–	Dhofar	?	(34)

International career
2012–2019	Oman	35	(1)
- * Club domestic league appearances and goals

Ali Salim Obaid Bait Al-Nahar (Arabic: علي بن سالم بيت النحار; born 21 August 1992), commonly known as Ali Salim Al-Nahar, is an Omani footballer who plays for Dhofar S.C.S.C. in Oman Professional League.

== Club career ==
He began his professional playing career with Omani giants Dhofar S.C.S.C. in 2010. At the end of the 2011-12 season, he scored his first goal for the club in a 2–1 win over rivals Al-Ittihad Club in the final of 2011 Sultan Qaboos Cup hence helping his club to clinch their 8th Sultan Qaboos Cup title.

== International career ==
Ali is part of the first team squad of the Oman national football team. He was selected for the national team for the first time in 2012. He made his first appearance for Oman on 11 December 2012 against Kuwait in the 2012 WAFF Championship. He has made appearances in the 2012 WAFF Championship, the 2014 FIFA World Cup qualification, the 2014 WAFF Championship and the 2015 AFC Asian Cup qualification and has represented the national team in the 21st Arabian Gulf Cup.

== Career statistics ==
=== Club ===
Club	Season	Division	League		Cup		Continental (Note: Includes appearances in the AFC Cup)		Other		Total	
Club	Season	Division	Apps	Goals	Apps	Goals	Apps	Goals	Apps	Goals	Apps	Goals
Dhofar	2011–12	Oman Professional League	-	0	-	1	0	0	-	0	-	1
Dhofar	2012–13	Oman Professional League	-	2	-	0	4	0	-	0	-	2
Dhofar	2013–14	Oman Professional League	-	1	-	1	0	0	-	0	-	2
Dhofar	2014–15	Oman Professional League	-	1	-	0	0	0	-	0	-	1
Dhofar	Total		-	4	-	2	4	0	-	0	-	6
Career total			-	4	-	2	4	0	-	0	-	6

=== International ===
Appearances and goals by national team and year
National team	Year	Apps	Goals
Oman	2012	4	0
Oman	2013	7	0
Oman	2014	9	0
Oman	2015	7	0
Oman	2016	3	1
Oman	2017	–	
Oman	2018	4	0
Oman	2019	1	0
Total		35	1

Scores and results list Oman's goal tally first, score column indicates score after each Al-Nahar goal.

List of international goals scored by Ali Salim Al-Nahar
No.	Date	Venue	Opponent	Score	Result	Competition
1	14 November 2016	Thuwunna Stadium, Yangon, Myanmar	Myanmar	1–0	3–0	Friendly

== Honours ==
=== Club ===
- With Dhofar
  - Omani League (0): Runner-up 2009-10
  - Sultan Qaboos Cup (1): 2011
  - Oman Professional League Cup (1): 2012-13; Runner-up 2014–15
  - Oman Super Cup (0): Runner-up 2012
  - Baniyas SC International Tournament (1): Winner 2014
