= Hamoud Al-Saadi =

Omani footballer (born 1992)

Personal information
- Date of birth: 26 January 1992 (age 34)
- Place of birth: Muscat, Oman
- Height: 1.72 m (5 ft 8 in)
- Position: Centre forward

Team information
- Current team: Dhofar
- Number: 18

Youth career
- 2005–2008: Bowsher

Senior career*
Years	Team	Apps	(Gls)
2010–2012	Al-Suwaiq	?	(1)
2012–	Dhofar		(11)

International career
2011	Oman U-23	2	(0)
2014–	Oman	6	(1)
- * Club domestic league appearances and goals

Hamoud Al-Saadi (Arabic: حمود السعدي; born 26 January 1992) is an Omani footballer who plays for Dhofar S.C.S.C. in Oman Professional League.

== Club career ==
On 25 September 2012, he signed a contract with Dhofar S.C.S.C. On 7 July 2014, he agreed a one-year contract extension with Dhofar S.C.S.C.

=== Club career statistics ===
Club	Season	Division	League		Cup		Continental (Note: Includes appearances in the AFC Cup)		Other		Total	
Club	Season	Division	Apps	Goals	Apps	Goals	Apps	Goals	Apps	Goals	Apps	Goals
Al-Suwaiq	2010–11	Oman Elite League	-	0	-	0	6	0	-	0	-	0
Al-Suwaiq	2011–12	Oman Elite League	-	1	-	1	5	1	-	0	-	3
Al-Suwaiq	Total		-	1	-	1	11	1	-	0	-	3
Dhofar	2012–13	Oman Professional League	-	5	-	1	5	0	-	0	-	6
Dhofar	2013–14	Oman Professional League	-	6	-	1	0	0	-	0	-	7
Dhofar	Total		-	11	-	2	5	0	-	0	-	13
Career total			-	12	-	3	16	1	-	0	-	16

== International career ==
Hamoud is part of the first team squad of the Oman national football team. He was selected for the national team for the first time in 2014. He made his first appearance for Oman on 11 October 2011 against Australia in a 2014 FIFA World Cup qualification match. He has made appearances in the 2014 WAFF Championship and has represented the national team in the 2014 FIFA World Cup qualification.

== National team career statistics ==
=== Goals for Senior National Team ===
Scores and results list Oman's goal tally first.

#	Date	Venue	Opponent	Score	Result	Competition
1	9 July 2011	Camille Chamoun Sports City Stadium, Beirut, Lebanon	Lebanon	1–0	1–0	Friendly

== Honours ==
=== Club ===
- With Al-Suwaiq

- Omani League (1): 2010–11
- Oman Super Cup (0): Runner-up 2010, 2011

- With Dhofar

- Oman Professional League Cup (1): 2012; Runner-up 2014–15
- Oman Super Cup (0): Runner-up 2012
- Baniyas SC International Tournament (1): Winner 2014
