= Basim Al-Rajaibi =

Omani footballer (born 1992)

Personal information
- Full name: Basim Abdullah Taeeb Al-Rajaibi
- Date of birth: 13 April 1992 (age 34)
- Place of birth: Bahla, Oman
- Height: 1.70 m (5 ft 7 in)
- Positions: Left back; midfielder

Team information
- Current team: Al-Nahda

Youth career
- 2006–2011: Dhofar

Senior career*
Years	Team	Apps	(Gls)
2011–2016	Dhofar		(1+)
2016–	Al-Nahda		

International career
2010	Oman U23	2	(0)
2012–2013	Oman	5	(0)
- * Club domestic league appearances and goals

Basim Abdullah Taeeb Al-Rajaibi (Arabic: باسم عبد الله الرجيبي; born 13 April 1992) is an Omani footballer who plays as a left back or midfielder for Omani club Al-Nahda.

== International career ==
Basim was part of the first team squad of the Oman national football team. He was selected for the national team for the first time in 2012. He made his first appearance for Oman on 8 December 2012 against Lebanon in the 2012 WAFF Championship. He has made appearances in the 2012 WAFF Championship and has represented the nation team in the 2014 FIFA World Cup qualification and the 2015 AFC Asian Cup qualification.

== Career statistics ==
Club	Season	Division	League		Cup		Continental (Note: Includes appearances in the AFC Cup)		Other		Total	
Club	Season	Division	Apps	Goals	Apps	Goals	Apps	Goals	Apps	Goals	Apps	Goals
Dhofar	2012–13	Oman Elite League	-	0	-	0	2	0	-	0	-	0
Career total			-	0	-	0	2	0	-	0	-	0

== Honours ==
=== Club ===
- With Dhofar

- Sultan Qaboos Cup: 2011
- Oman Professional League Cup: 2012-13
- Baniyas SC International Tournament: 2014
