= Nabil Ashoor =

Omani footballer (born 1982)

Personal information
- Full name: Nabil Ashoor Ramadhan Bait Faraj Allah
- Date of birth: April 7, 1982 (age 44)
- Place of birth: Oman
- Height: 1.82 m (6 ft 0 in)
- Position: Defender

Team information
- Current team: Dhofar
- Number: 23

Senior career*
Years	Team	Apps	(Gls)
2003–2007	Al-Nasr	?	(5)
2007–2009	Al-Jahra	?	(1)
2009–2010	Al-Nasr	?	(1)
2010–2011	Al-Jahra	?	(0)
2011–2015	Dhofar		(1)

International career
2000–2008	Oman	37	(1)
- * Club domestic league appearances and goals

Nabil Ashoor Ramadhan Bait Faraj Allah (Arabic: نَبِيل عَاشُور رَمَضَان بَيْت فَرَج الله; born 7 April 1982), commonly known as Nabil Ashoor, is an Omani footballer who plays for Dhofar S.C.S.C. in the Oman Professional League.

== Club career ==
On 10 August 2014, he signed a contract extension with Dhofar S.C.S.C.

=== Club career statistics ===
Club	Season	Division	League		Cup		Continental (Note: Includes appearances in the AFC Cup)		Other		Total	
Club	Season	Division	Apps	Goals	Apps	Goals	Apps	Goals	Apps	Goals	Apps	Goals
Al-Nasr	2003–04	Omani League	-	1	-	1	0	0	-	0	-	2
Al-Nasr	2004–05	Omani League	-	4	-	0	0	0	-	0	-	4
Al-Nasr	2005–06	Omani League	-	3	-	0	-	1	-	0	-	4
Al-Nasr	2006–07	Omani League	-	1	-	0	0	0	-	0	-	1
Al-Nasr	Total		-	9	-	1	-	1	-	0	-	11
Al-Jahra	2007–08	Kuwaiti Premier League	-	1	-	1	0	0	-	0	-	2
Al-Jahra	Total		-	1	-	1	0	0	-	0	-	2
Al-Nasr	2009–10	Omani League	-	1	-	0	0	0	-	0	-	1
Al-Nasr	Total		-	1	0	0	0	-	0	0	-	1
Al-Jahra	2009–10	Kuwaiti Premier League	-	0	-	2	0	0	-	0	-	2
Al-Jahra	2010–11	Kuwaiti Premier League	-	0	-	1	0	0	-	0	-	1
Al-Jahra	Total		-	0	-	3	0	0	-	0	-	3
Dhofar	2012–13	Oman Professional League	-	0	-	1	3	0	-	0	-	1
Dhofar	2013–14	Oman Professional League	-	1	-	0	0	0	-	0	-	1
Dhofar	Total		-	1	-	1	3	0	-	0	-	2
Career total			-	12	-	6	-	1	-	0	-	19

== International career ==
Nabil was selected for the national team for the first time in 2000. He has made appearances in the 2002 FIFA World Cup qualification, 2004 AFC Asian Cup, 2006 FIFA World Cup qualification and the 2010 FIFA World Cup qualification.

== Honours ==
=== Club ===
- With Al-Nasr

- Omani League (0): 2003-04
- Sultan Qaboos Cup (1): 2005

- With Dhofar

- Sultan Qaboos Cup (1): 2011
- Oman Professional League Cup (1): 2012-13; Runner-up 2014–15
- Oman Super Cup (0): Runner-up 2012
- Baniyas SC International Tournament (1): Winner 2014
