= Hani Al-Sabti =

Omani footballer

Personal information
- Full name: Hani Najm A'deen Awadh Bait Saleem Al-Sabti
- Date of birth: 27 February 1984 (age 42)
- Place of birth: Salalah, Oman
- Height: 1.85 m (6 ft 1 in)
- Position: Goalkeeper

Team information
- Current team: Dhofar
- Number: 18

Youth career
- 1999–2004: Dhofar

Senior career*
Years	Team	Apps	(Gls)
2004–	Dhofar		

International career
2012	Oman	1	(0)
- * Club domestic league appearances and goals

Hani Najm A'deen Awadh Bait Saleem Al-Sabti (Arabic: هاني نجم الدين عوض بيت سليم السبتي; born 27 April 1993), commonly known as Hani Al-Sabti, is an Omani footballer who plays for Dhofar S.C.S.C. in Oman Professional League.

== Club career ==
On 8 June 2014, he signed a one-year contract extension with Dhofar S.C.S.C.

== International career ==
Hani was selected for the national team for the first time in 2013. He earned his first international cap for Oman on 29 February 2012 against Thailand in a 2014 FIFA World Cup qualification match. He has represented the national team in 2014 FIFA World Cup qualification and the 21st Arabian Gulf Cup.

== Honours ==
=== Club ===
Dhofar S.C.S.C.
- Omani League (1): 2004-05; Runners-up 2007-08, 2008-09, 2009-10
- Sultan Qaboos Cup (3): 2004, 2006, 2011; Runners-up 2009
- Oman Professional League Cup (1): 2012–13; Runners-up 2014–15
- Oman Super Cup (0): Runners-up 2005, 2012
- Baniyas SC International Tournament (1): Winners 2014
