= 2016 Oman Super Cup =

Football match

Fanja	Saham
0	1
- Saham were crowned the 2016 Oman Super Cup champions.
- Date: 8 September 2016
- Venue: Al-Seeb Stadium, Al-Seeb, Oman

The 2016 Oman Super Cup was the 14th edition of the Oman Super Cup, an annual football match between Fanja SC, the champions of the 2015–16 Oman Professional League and Saham Club the winners of the 2015–16 Sultan Qaboos Cup. The match was played at the Al-Seeb Stadium in Al-Seeb, Oman.

On 8 September 2016, Saham claimed their Super Cup title after securing a 1–0 win over Fanja. Their new signing Badar Al-Jabri struck in the second half to secure a thrilling 1–0 win over the defending Oman Professional League champions in the opening game of the 2016–17 Omani football season.

== Match details ==
8 September 2016
19:30 (UTC+4)

Fanja	0–1	Saham
		Badar Al-Jabri 71'

Al-Seeb Stadium, Al-Seeb, Oman
Referee: Khalid Al-Shaqsi (Oman)
