= Hameed Al-Gheilani =

Omani footballer (born 1984)

Personal information
- Full name: Hameed Jumaa Saad Allah Al-Gheilani
- Date of birth: 4 May 1984 (age 42)
- Place of birth: Muscat, Oman
- Height: 1.79 m (5 ft 10 in)
- Position: Defensive midfielder

Team information
- Current team: Al-Seeb
- Number: 25

Youth career
- 2008–2010: Al-Oruba

Senior career*
Years	Team	Apps	(Gls)
2010–2011	Sur	?	(0)
2011–2013	Al-Oruba	?	(3)
2013	Al-Nahda	?	(0)
2013–2014	Al-Oruba	?	(0)
2014–	Al-Seeb		

International career
2012–2013	Oman	3	(0)
- * Club domestic league appearances and goals

Hameed Jumaa Saad Allah Al-Gheilani (Arabic: حميد جمعة سعد الله الغيلاني; born 4 May 1984), commonly known as Hameed Al-Gheilani, is an Omani footballer who plays for Al-Seeb Club in Oman Professional League.

== Club career ==
On 28 August 2014, he signed a one-year contract with Al-Seeb Club.

=== Club career statistics ===
Club	Season	Division	League		Cup		Continental (Note: Includes appearances in the AFC Cup)		Other		Total	
Club	Season	Division	Apps	Goals	Apps	Goals	Apps	Goals	Apps	Goals	Apps	Goals
Al-Oruba	2011–12	Oman Elite League	-	0	-	0	5	0	-	0	-	0
Al-Oruba	2012–13	Oman Elite League	-	3	-	1	0	0	-	0	-	4
Al-Oruba	Total		-	3	-	1	5	0	-	0	-	4
Career total			-	3	-	1	5	0	-	0	-	4

== International career ==
Hameed is part of the first team squad of the Oman national football team. He was selected for the national team for the first time in 2012. He made his first appearance for Oman on 30 January 2013 in a friendly match against China in 2013. He has represented the national team in the 2010 FIFA World Cup qualification, the 2014 FIFA World Cup qualification and the 2015 AFC Asian Cup qualification.

== Honours ==
Al-Oruba

- Omani Super Cup: 2011
