= 2012–13 Oman Federation Cup =

2012–13 Omani Federation Cup
Tournament details
- Country: Oman
- Teams: 12

Final positions
- Champions: Dhofar
- Runners-up: Saham

Tournament statistics
- Matches played: 31
- Goals scored: 67 (2.16 per match)
- Top goal scorer(s): (Oman) Younis Al-Mushaifri (4 goals)

The 2012–13 Omani Federation Cup was the second edition of a pre-season football competition held in Oman. The first edition was played in 2007. The competition started on 2 August 2012 and finished on 28 January 2013.

The competition featured four groups of 3 teams, with the top two advancing to the quarter-final stages.

The competition featured all the clubs playing in the top flight in the 2012–13 season. Two clubs, Oman Club and Al-Seeb Club who won the first edition withdrew due to a dispute with the Oman Football Association.

== Group stage ==
=== Group A ===
Team	Pld	W	D	L	GF	GA	GD	Pts
(Oman) Dhofar	4	3	1	0	5	0	+5	10
(Oman) Al-Nasr	4	2	1	1	7	2	+5	7
(Oman) Salalah	4	0	0	4	0	10	−10	0

=== Group B ===
Team	Pld	W	D	L	GF	GA	GD	Pts
(Oman) Sur	4	3	1	0	9	2	+7	10
(Oman) Al-Oruba	4	1	2	1	5	4	+1	5
(Oman) Al-Tali'aa	4	0	1	3	1	9	−8	1

=== Group C ===
Team	Pld	W	D	L	GF	GA	GD	Pts
(Oman) Saham	4	2	1	1	6	4	+2	7
(Oman) Al-Suwaiq	4	1	3	0	3	2	+1	6
(Oman) Al-Nahda	4	0	2	2	1	4	−3	2

=== Group D ===
Team	Pld	W	D	L	GF	GA	GD	Pts
(Oman) Fanja	4	2	1	1	11	7	+4	7
(Oman) Al-Musannah	4	1	2	1	7	9	−2	5
(Oman) Al-Shabab	4	1	1	2	5	7	−2	4

== Quarter finals ==
28 December 2012
19:00 UTC+4

Dhofar	0 – 0	Al-Suwaiq
Penalties
	4 – 1

Al-Saada Stadium, Salalah, Oman
28 December 2012
19:00 UTC+4

Fanja	2 – 1	Al-Oruba
Mohammed Al-Mashari 53'; Sidy Keita 81'		Sami Al-Hasani 85'

Seeb Stadium, Seeb, Oman
29 December 2012
18:15 UTC+4

Sur	1 – 1	Al-Musannah
Penalties
	4 – 3

Sur Sports Complex, Sur, Oman
30 December 2012
18:15 UTC+4

Saham	0 – 0	Al-Nasr
Penalties
	4 – 2

Sohar Regional Sports Complex, Sohar, Oman

== Semi finals ==
3 January 2013
19:15 UTC+4

Saham	0 – 0	Fanja
Penalties
	4 – 3

Sohar Regional Sports Complex, Sohar, Oman
3 January 2013
19:15 UTC+4

Sur	1 – 1	Dhofar
Khalid Al-Alawi 71'		Ahmed Manaa 10'
Penalties
	1 – 4

Sur Sports Complex, Sur, Oman

== Final ==
3 January 2013
19:15 UTC+4

Saham	0 – 0	Dhofar
Penalties
	4 – 5
