= Adel Arghand =

Iranian footballer

Personal information
- Date of birth: 21 March 2001 (age 25)
- Place of birth: Ahvaz, Iran
- Height: 1.86 m (6 ft 1 in)
- Position: Striker

Team information
- Current team: Oman Club
- Number: 14

Youth career
- 2022: Foolad

Senior career*
Years	Team	Apps	(Gls)
2022–2024	Foolad	17	(1)
2024–2025	Esteghlal Khuzestan	8	(0)
2025–	Oman Club	4	(0)
- * Club domestic league appearances and goals as of 19 June 2024

Adel Arghand (Persian: عادل آرغند, born 21 March 2001) is an Iranian footballer who plays as a striker for Oman Club in the Oman Professional League.
