= 2007 Omani Federation Cup =

Tournament details
- Country: Oman
- Teams: 8

Final positions
- Champions: Al-Seeb
- Runner-up: Sur

Tournament statistics
- Matches played: 15
- Goals scored: 34 (2.27 per match)

The 2007 Omani Federation Cup was the first edition of a pre-season football competition held in Oman and was also known as Oman FA Cup. The competition started on 10 May 2007 and finished on 24 May 2007.

The competition featured of two groups of 4 teams, with the top two advancing to the semi-final stages.

The competition featured the top eight clubs playing in the top flight in the 2006–07 season.

== Group stage ==
=== Group A ===
Team	Pld	W	D	L	GF	GA	GD	Pts
(Oman) Al-Nahda	3	2	1	0	5	2	+3	7
(Oman) Al-Seeb	3	2	0	1	3	2	+1	6
(Oman) Muscat	3	1	1	1	4	4	0	4
(Oman) Dhofar	3	0	0	3	2	6	−4	0

=== Group B ===
Team	Pld	W	D	L	GF	GA	GD	Pts
(Oman) Al-Nasr	3	2	0	1	5	4	+1	6
(Oman) Al-Oruba	3	1	1	1	5	5	0	4
(Oman) Sur	3	1	1	1	2	2	0	4
(Oman) Al-Tali'aa	3	0	2	1	2	3	−1	2

== Semi finals ==
20 May 2007
18:00 UTC+4

Sur	1 – 1	Al-Nahda
Abdullah Al-Mukhaini 46'		Arif Al-Balushi 90+3'
Penalties
	5–4

Sur Sports Complex, Sur, Oman
20 May 2007
20:00 UTC+4

Al-Nasr	0 – 1	Sur

Al-Saada Stadium, Salalah, Oman

== Final ==
24 May 2007
19:30 UTC+4

Al-Seeb	2 – 1	Sur
