= 2012–13 Oman Elite League =

Omantel Elite League
- Season: 2012–13
- Champions: Al-Suwaiq
- Relegated: Al-Tali'aa; Oman; Salalah
- AFC Champions League qualifiers: Al-Suwaiq
- 2014 AFC Cup: Fanja; Saham
- Matches: 182
- Goals: 425 (2.34 per match)
- Top goalscorer: (Senegal) Ely Cissé (14 goals)
- Biggest home win: Saham 5–0 Fanja (17 February 2013)
- Biggest away win: Salalah 0–6 Al-Shabab (18 May 2013)
- Highest scoring: Sur 2–5 Saham (1 March 2013)
- Longest winning run: (5 games); Al-Suwaiq
- Longest unbeaten run: (15 games); Al-Suwaiq
- Longest losing run: (6 games); Al-Seeb

The 2012–13 Oman Elite League (known as the Omantel Elite League for sponsorship reasons) was the 37th edition of the top football league in Oman. It began on 4 October 2012 and was scheduled to finish on 19 May 2013, but for the second season running, the league title had to be decided by a playoff. Fanja SC were the defending champions, having won the previous 2011–12 Elite League season. Al-Suwaiq Club won the Championship Final match against Fanja 3–1 and emerged as the champions of the 2012–13 Oman Elite League.

== Teams ==
This season the league had increased from 12 to 14 teams. As a result, despite losing the relegation play-off to Al-Seeb Club, Salalah SC retained their place in the top division and Al-Musannah SC, whose 11th-place finish would have seen them relegated also retained their place in the top division. Ahli Sidab Club, however were relegated to the Second Division League. Saham SC and Al-Nasr S.C.S.C. were promoted to the Omani League (First Division) after finishing in the top two positions in the Second Division League in the 2011–12 season.

The winner qualified for the AFC Champions League qualifiers and the runner-up and the second runner-up qualified for the 2014 AFC Cup.

=== Stadia and locations ===
Club	Home city	Manager	Stadium	Capacity
Al-Musannah	Al-Musannah	(Oman) Suhail Al-Rashidi	Seeb Stadium	14,000
Al-Nahda	Al-Buraimi	(Oman) Hamad Al-Azani	Nizwa Sports Complex	10,000
Al-Nasr	Salalah	(Algeria) Zoheïr Djelloul	Al-Saada Stadium / Salalah Sports Complex	12,000 / 8,000
Al-Oruba	Sur	(Tunisia) Omar Mazian	Sur Sports Complex	8,000
Al-Seeb	Seeb		Seeb Stadium	14,000
Al-Shabab	Barka	(Syria) Mohammed Hawali (November 2012-February 2013) (Morocco) Driss El Mrabet (June 2013-)	Seeb Stadium	14,000
Al-Suwaiq	Al-Suwaiq		Seeb Stadium	14,000
Al-Tali'aa	Sur	(Spain) Hicham Jadran Ghazouani	Sur Sports Complex	8,000
Dhofar	Salalah	(Egypt) Mokhtar Mokhtar	Al-Saada Stadium / Salalah Sports Complex	12,000 / 8,000
Fanja	Fanja	(Iraq) Modhaffar Jabbar	Seeb Stadium	14,000
Oman	Muscat	(Oman) Ibrahim Somar	Sultan Qaboos Sports Complex / Royal Oman Police Stadium	39,000 / 18,000
Saham	Saham	(Romania) Aristică Cioabă	Sohar Regional Sports Complex	19,000
Salalah^{*}	Salalah		Al-Saada Stadium / Salalah Sports Complex	12,000 / 8,000
Sur	Sur		Sur Sports Complex	8,000

^{*}Al-Hilal Salalah renamed Salalah in the close season

== Foreign players ==
Club	Player 1	Player 2	Player 3	AFC Player	Former Players
Al-Musannah	(Brazil) Marcinho Pitbull			(Yemen) Salem Saeed	(Togo) Francis Koné
Al-Nahda	(Brazil) Paulo Júnior	(Brazil) Valci Júnior	(Ivory Coast) Jumaa Saeed	(Bahrain) Jamal Rashid	(Togo) Zakari Morou
Al-Nasr	(Jordan) Khaled Saad	(Kenya) Kepha Aswani		(Yemen) Mohamed Asaad	(Benin) Séidou Barazé (Morocco) Jaouad Zairi

== League table ==
Pos	Team	Pld	W	D	L	GF	GA	GD	Pts	Qualification or relegation
1	Al-Suwaiq (C)	26	13	11	2	33	21	+12	50	2014 AFC Cup group stage (Note: Al-Suwaiq played in the 2014 AFC Champions League qualifying play-off and failed to advance to the AFC Champions League group stage, hence entered the AFC Cup group stage.)
2	Fanja	26	15	5	6	33	24	+9	50	2014 AFC Cup group stage
3	Saham	26	13	9	4	40	19	+21	48	2014 GCC Champions League group stage
4	Al-Nahda	26	12	7	7	41	30	+11	43	2014 GCC Champions League group stage
5	Al-Nasr	26	10	10	6	39	29	+10	40	
6	Dhofar	26	10	10	6	34	28	+6	40	
7	Al-Oruba	26	8	11	7	26	22	+4	35	
8	Al-Shabab	26	9	6	11	31	31	0	33	
9	Al-Musannah	26	8	7	11	26	32	−6	31	
10	Sur	26	7	9	10	26	30	−4	30	
11	Al-Seeb	26	8	5	13	22	33	−11	29	
12	Al-Tali'aa (R)	26	8	3	15	26	38	−12	27	Relegation Playoff
13	Oman (R)	26	7	3	16	25	38	−13	24	Relegation to 2013–14 Oman First Division League
14	Salalah (R)	26	3	6	17	23	50	−27	15	Relegation to 2013–14 Oman First Division League

Updated to match(es) played on 19 May 2013. Source: League Table
Rules for classification: 1) points; 2) goal difference; 3) number of goals scored.
(C) Champions; (R) Relegated

== Results ==
Home \ Away	ALM	ALNH	ALN	ALO	ALS	ALSH	ALSU	ALT	DHO	FAN	OMA	SAH	SAL	SUR
Al-Musannah		1–1	1–1	0–1	1–0	2–1	2–4	1–2	3–0	1–1	0–2	0–1	2–2	2–1
Al-Nahda	1–1		1–0	0–1	2–1	3–3	2–0	2–1	3–1	1–2	3–0	2–2	3–0	2–2
Al-Nasr	2–0	3–1		0–0	1–1	2–1	1–1	3–1	1–1	0–1	3–1	2–2	3–0	0–0
Al-Oruba	0–2	3–1	2–2		0–0	2–0	2–3	1–1	0–0	0–1	1–2	2–1	3–1	1–1
Al-Seeb	2–0	1–2	1–3	0–0		3–0	0–2	0–1	1–2	0–1	1–0	1–1	2–1	1–1
Al-Shabab	1–0	1–0	1–1	1–1	2–1		0–0	2–1	2–0	0–1	0–1	0–0	2–0	0–0
Al-Suwaiq	1–1	2–1	1–1	1–1	1–0	1–0		1–0	0–0	0–0	1–1	2–1	1–1	0–2
Al-Tali'aa	0–3	0–1	1–2	2–1	1–2	1–3	1–1		1–2	1–2	2–1	0–0	1–0	0–1
Dhofar	0–0	2–1	3–2	0–0	4–0	3–0	1–3	5–1		1–1	0–0	0–0	1–4	0–0
Fanja	3–0	0–0	2–0	1–0	0–1	3–1	1–2	0–2	0–2		1–0	1–2	1–0	3–1
Oman	3–0	1–2	0–3	0–1	1–2	0–3	0–1	0–2	3–0	5–0		4–1	1–1	2–1
Saham	1–0	0–2	3–0	1–0	3–0	3–1	1–1	0–2	3–0	5–0	4–1		3–1	2–1
Salalah	1–2	0–2	2–1	1–3	3–0	0–6	1–2	0–2	0–0	2–2	1–4	0–0		1–2
Sur	0–1	2–2	1–2	0–0	0–1	2–0	0–1	2–1	2–5	1–2	0–2	0–0	1–0	

Updated to match(es) played on 19 May 2013. Source: Results
Legend: Blue = home team win; Yellow = draw; Red = away team win.

== Championship play-off ==
22 May 2013
19:30 UTC+4

Al-Suwaiq	3–1	Fanja
Al-Ghassani 11'; Al-Noufali 48', 74'	Report	Cissé 61' (pen.)

Sultan Qaboos Sports Complex, Muscat, Oman

== Promotion/relegation play-off ==
=== 1st leg ===
22 May 2013
19:30 UTC+4

Sohar	0–0	Al Tali'aa
	Report

Sohar Regional Sports Complex, Sohar, Oman

=== 2nd leg ===
25 May 2013
19:30 UTC+4

Al Tali'aa	1–1	Sohar
	Report

Sur Sports Complex, Sur, Oman

Sohar secured promotion after winning on the away goals rule

== Season statistics ==
=== Top scorers ===
As of 19 May 2013

Rank	Scorer	Club	Goals
1	(Senegal) Ely Cissé	Fanja	14
2	(Brazil) Luomar	Al-Shabab	12
3	(Oman) Qasim Said	Al-Nasr	10
3	(Bahrain) Mehdi Abdul Jabbar	Al-Tali'aa	10
5	(Oman) Mohammed Said Al-Shamsi	Al-Nasr	9
5	(Ivory Coast) Juma Saeed	Al-Nahda	9
5	Steve Paul	Sur	9
8	(Oman) Yaqoob Abdul-Karim	Saham	8
8	(Oman) Mohammed Al Mashaikhi	Al-Nahda	8
8	(Oman) Hashim Saleh	Al-Shabab	8
8	(Togo) Francis Koné	Al-Musannah	8

== Media coverage ==
Omantel Elite League Media Coverage
Country	Television Channel	Matches
Oman	Oman TV2	3 Matches per round

== See also ==
- 2012–13 Sultan Qaboos Cup
- 2012–13 Oman Federation Cup
- 2012–13 Oman First Division League
