= Felix Ogbuke =

Nigerian footballer

Personal information
- Date of birth: 18 September 1985 (age 41)
- Place of birth: Enugu, Nigeria
- Height: 1.83 m (6 ft 0 in)
- Position: Forward

Senior career*
Years	Team	Apps	(Gls)
2002–2003	Enugu Rangers		
2003–2004	Al-Wasl		
2004–2006	Ashdod	40	(3)
2006–2007	Hapoel Tel Aviv	10	(1)
2007–2009	Maccabi Petah Tikva	17	(1)
2009–2010	Hakoah Amidar Ramat Gan	10	(0)
2010–2011	Apollon Limassol	9	(0)
2011	→ Legia Warsaw (loan)	7	(0)
2011–2013	Ansfed United		
2014	Hoàng Anh Gia Lai	21	(5)
2015	Dhofar		
2016	QNK Quảng Nam	11	(1)
2018–2019	Enugu Rangers		
2020–2021	Enugu Rangers		
- * Club domestic league appearances and goals

Felix Onyedika Ogbuke// (born 18 September 1985) is a Nigerian former professional footballer who played as a striker.

== Club career ==
Ogbuke started his professional career with Rangers Football Club of Enugu in the 2002–03 Nigerian Professional Football League (NPFL) Season. His career in Europe started after playing a part in Nigeria’s U23 team campaign in the All Africa Games tagged COJA 2003. He joined Al Was of United Arab Emirate, UAE, (2003–2004) from where he moved to Israeli side F.C. Ashdod (2004–2006).

Ogbuke starred for three other Israeli clubs, Hapoel Tel Aviv (2006-2007), Macabi Petah Tekva (2007-2009) and Hakoah Amidar Ramat Gan (2009-2010) before he was snapped up by Cyprus giants, Apollon Limassol (2010-2011).

Ogbuke returned to the Nigerian league briefly to play for Sharks before joining Polish side, Legia Warsaw (2011) from where moved to Vietnamese side, Hoang Anh Via Laid (2014) and later GNK Quang Nam also of Vietnam (2016). He was released by Vietnamese club QNK Quang Nam in 2017 and in January 2018, Oguke was signed by Rangers.

In January 2020, Ogbuke rejoined Enugu Rangers on a six-months contract after he was initially considered surplus for requirement and eased out by the club.

== International career ==
Ogbuke represented Nigeria at the U17s, U20s, U23s and at the full senior international level.

== Honours ==
Legia Warsaw

- Polish Cup: 2010–11
