= 2011–12 Oman Elite League =

Omantel Elite League
- Season: 2011–12
- Champions: Fanja
- Relegated: Ahli Sidab
- AFC Cup: Fanja; Dhofar
- Matches: 132
- Goals: 311 (2.36 per match)
- Top goalscorer: (Oman) Waleed Al-Saadi (14 goals)
- Biggest home win: Al-Suwaiq 4–0 Salalah (29 April 2012)
- Biggest away win: Al-Musannah 1–5 Salalah (27 January 2012)
- Highest scoring: Al-Nahda 4–3 Al-Musannah (29 March 2012); Al-Musannah 3–4 Oman (14 April 2012); Ahli Sidab 3–4 Al-Shabab (4 May 2012)
- Longest winning run: (4 games); Fanja
- Longest unbeaten run: (9 games); Fanja
- Longest losing run: (4 games); Al-Tali'aa; Al-Nahda

The 2011–12 Oman Elite League (known as the Omantel Elite League for sponsorship reasons) was the 36th edition of the top football league in Oman. It began on 25 September 2011 and was scheduled to finish on 19 May 2012, but for the first time in the history of Omani League, the league title had to be decided by a playoff. Al-Suwaiq Club were the defending champions, having won the previous 2010–11 Elite League season. On Monday, 21 May 2012, Fanja SC won the Championship Final match against Al-Shabab Club 7–6 on penalties after the match had ended 3–3 after extra time and emerged as the champions of the 2011–12 Oman Elite League.

== Teams ==
This season the league had 12 teams. Saham SC and Al-Nasr S.C.S.C. were relegated to the Second Division League after finishing in the relegation zone in the 2010–11 season. Muscat Club were also relegated after losing the relegation/promotion playoff against Fanja SC. The winner qualified for 2013 AFC Cup. The three relegated teams were replaced by Second Division League winners Fanja SC (Group A) and Sur SC (Group B) and runners-up Al-Musannah SC (Group B).

=== Stadia and locations ===
Club	Home city	Stadium	Capacity
Al-Musannah	Al-Musannah	Seeb Stadium	14,000
Al-Nahda	Al-Buraimi	Nizwa Sports Complex	10,000
Al-Oruba	Sur	Sur Sports Complex	8,000
Al-Shabab	Barka	Seeb Stadium	14,000
Ahli Sidab	Sidab	Sultan Qaboos Sports Complex	39,000
Al-Suwaiq	Al-Suwaiq	Sohar Regional Sports Complex	19,000
Al-Tali'aa	Sur	Sur Sports Complex	8,000
Dhofar	Salalah	Al-Saada Stadium / Salalah Sports Complex	12,000 / 8,000
Fanja	Fanja	Seeb Stadium	14,000
Oman	Muscat	Sultan Qaboos Sports Complex / Royal Oman Police Stadium	39,000 / 18,000
Al-Hilal	Salalah	Al-Saada Stadium	12,000
Sur	Sur	Sur Sports Complex	8,000

== League table ==
As of 19 May 2012

Pos	Team	Pld	W	D	L	GF	GA	GD	Pts	Qualification or relegation
1	Fanja (C)	22	12	7	3	31	19	+12	43	2013 AFC Cup group stage
2	Al-Shabab	22	13	4	5	28	19	+9	43	2012–13 GCC Champions League group stage
3	Al-Oruba	22	10	10	2	28	16	+12	40	
4	Al-Tali'aa	22	9	5	8	23	22	+1	32	
5	Dhofar	22	8	7	7	19	18	+1	31	2013 AFC Cup group stage (Note: Dhofar won the 2011 Sultan Qaboos Cup and qualified for the 2013 AFC Cup (final came too late for 2012 AFC Cup))
6	Oman	22	9	3	10	24	25	−1	30	
7	Al-Suwaiq	22	7	7	8	30	22	+8	28	
8	Sur	22	7	7	8	20	23	−3	28	
9	Al-Nahda	22	8	3	11	27	33	−6	27	
10	Al-Hilal	22	6	7	9	22	35	−13	25	Relegation Playoff
11	Al-Musannah	22	6	4	12	35	39	−4	22	
12	Ahli Sidab (R)	22	3	4	15	24	40	−16	13	Relegation to 2012–13 Oman First Division League

Updated to match(es) played on 19 May 2012. Source: League Table
Rules for classification: 1) points; 2) goal difference; 3) number of goals scored.
(C) Champions; (R) Relegated

== Results ==
Home \ Away	ALM	ALNH	ALO	ALSH	ALH	ALSU	ALT	DHO	FAN	OMA	ALHI	SUR
Al-Musannah		1–2	1–1	0–2	2–1	0–3	3–2	2–2	2–3	3–4	3–0	1–1
Al-Nahda	4–3		1–2	1–2	1–0	1–0	3–2	0–1	1–2	2–1	1–1	1–0
Al-Oruba	1–1	4–2		0–0	3–1	1–1	1–0	0–0	1–0	2–1	1–2	1–1
Al-Shabab	0–1	2–0	0–2		0–2	2–1	2–2	0–2	2–2	1–0	1–0	0–1
Ahli Sidab	1–2	2–1	2–2	3–4		2–2	0–0	0–2	0–2	1–2	2–1	1–2
Al-Suwaiq	2–1	1–1	0–1	0–1	4–1		2–1	0–1	2–2	0–0	4–0	3–0
Al-Tali'aa	2–1	1–0	0–0	0–2	2–1	1–0		2–0	0–1	0–0	1–0	1–0
Dhofar	2–1	0–1	0–0	1–1	1–0	1–2	3–0		0–0	0–2	1–1	0–2
Fanja	2–1	3–1	1–0	0–1	2–1	1–1	1–1	2–0		2–1	0–0	2–1
Oman	1–0	3–2	0–1	0–2	1–0	1–0	2–1	0–1	1–0		1–1	1–2
Al-Hilal	1–5	2–1	2–2	0–1	2–1	2–2	0–3	1–0	2–3	2–1		1–0
Sur	2–1	0–0	0–2	1–2	2–2	1–0	0–1	1–1	0–0	2–1	1–1	

Updated to match(es) played on 19 May 2012. Source: Results
Legend: Blue = home team win; Yellow = draw; Red = away team win.

== Championship play-off ==
21 May 2012
18:00 UTC+4

Fanja	3–3 (7–6)	Al-Shabab
Al-Hinai 41'; Cissé 105'; Al-Mahaijri 123'	Report	Rabia 17'; Ouganna 91', 116'

Sultan Qaboos Sports Complex, Muscat, Oman

== Promotion/relegation play-off ==
=== 1st leg ===
25 May 2012
19:30 UTC+4

Al-Seeb	1 - 1	Al-Hilal
Al-Farsi 13'	Report	Aman 42'

Sultan Qaboos Sports Complex, Muscat, Oman

=== 2nd leg ===
31 May 2012
19:30 UTC+4

Al-Hilal	2–3	Al-Seeb
Al-Mahroon 11'; Roberto 30'	Report	Al-Qaidhi 6'; Moosa 43'; Al-Noufali 88'

Al-Saada Stadium, Salalah, Oman

Al Seeb secured promotion after winning 4:3 on aggregate In the 2012–13 season the league had increased from 12 to 14 teams. As a result, despite losing the relegation play-off to Al-Seeb Club, Al-Hilal SC retained their place in the top division and Al-Musannah SC, whose 11th-place finish would have seen them relegated also retained their place in the top division.

== Season statistics ==
=== Top scorers ===
As of 19 May 2012

Rank	Scorer	Club	Goals
1	(Oman) Waleed Al-Saadi	Al-Suwaiq	14
2	(Senegal) Ely Cissé	Fanja	9
3	(Oman) Ahmed Al-Alawi	Al-Shabab	8
3	(Morocco) Youness Ouganna	Al-Musannah	8
5	(Oman) Mohammed Al-Ghassani	Al-Musannah	7
5	(Tunisia) Amin Al-Muhajri	Fanja	7
5	(Bahrain) A'ala Hubail	Al-Tali'aa	7
5	(Oman) Hashim Saleh	Dhofar	7
5	(Oman) Mohammed Mubarek Al Hinai	Fanja	7
10	(Brazil) Felipe Lohmann	Al-Tali'aa	6
10	(Oman) Khalid Al-Saadi	Al-Musannah	6
10	(Burkina Faso) Dah	Al-Nahda	6
10	(Brazil) Marco Aurelio	Sur	6
10	(Oman) Hassan Rabia	Al-Shabab	6

== Media coverage ==
Omantel Elite League Media Coverage
Country	Television Channel	Matches
Oman	Oman TV2	3 Matches per round

== See also ==
- 2011 Sultan Qaboos Cup
- 2011–12 Oman First Division League
