= Saham Club =

Omani sports club

Saham Club نادي صحم
- Full name: Saham Club (Blue Wave)
- Founded: 24 April 1972; 54 years ago
- Ground: Sohar Regional Sports Complex; Sohar, Oman
- Capacity: 19,000
- League: Oman Professional League
- 2025–26: 11th of 14
Home colours	Away colours	Third colours

Saham Club (Arabic: نادي صحم) is an Omani sports club based in Saham, in northeastern Oman. The club currently plays in the Oman Professional League, top division of Oman Football Association. Their home stadium is Sohar Regional Sports Complex. The stadium is government owned. The club also owns its own stadium and sports equipment, as well as its own training facilities.

== History ==
The club was founded on 24 April 1972 and registered on 26 June 2002.

The club was promoted to the Omani League after winning the final of 2007-08 First Division League, where the club defeated Al-Shabab Club on penalties.

The club caused a major upset when they beat 7-time Sultan Qaboos Cup winners, Dhofar in 2009, receiving their first ever Sultan Qaboos Cup title. Their most recent achievement was in 2013 when they won the first OPL Cup against Al-Seeb Club 3–2 on penalties after the match had ended 0–0 in normal time.

== Multisport club ==
Saham SC also hockey, volleyball, handball, basketball, badminton and squash. They also have a youth team competing in the Omani Youth League.

== Crest and colours ==
Saham SC have been known since establishment to wear a full blue or white (Away) kit (usually a darker shade of blue). They have also had many different sponsors over the years. As of now, Uhlsport provides them with kits.

== Achievements ==
=== Domestic ===
- Sultan Qaboos Cup
  - Winners (2): 2009, 2016
- Oman Professional League Cup
  - Winners (1): 2013
  - Runners-up (1): 2012
- Oman Super Cup
  - Winners (2): 2010, 2016
- Oman First Division League
  - Winners (1): 2011–12.

=== Continental ===
- GCC Champions League
  - Runners-up (1): 2014

== Club performance-International Competitions ==
=== AFC competitions ===
- AFC Cup: 1 appearance

- 2010: Group Stage

=== UAFA competitions ===
- GCC Champions League: 10 appearances

- 2011: Group Stage
- 2014: Runners-up

== Current squad ==
Note: Flags indicate national team as defined under FIFA eligibility rules; some limited exceptions apply. Players may hold more than one non-FIFA nationality.

No.	Pos.	Nation	Player
1	GK	OMA	Hassan Al-Breiki
2	DF	OMA	Mohammed Al-Balushi
3	DF	OMA	Salah Al-Kahali
4	FW	OMA	Ali Al-Hashemi
5	FW	MAR	Youssef Bouabid
6	MF	OMA	Mohammed Al-Mamari
7	FW	OMA	Zuhair Kassib
9	FW	ESP	Asier Gomes
11	FW	OMA	Abdullah Al-Murakhi
13	MF	OMA	Bassam Al-Saadi
14	MF	OMA	Al-Yaqdhan Al-Abdulsalam
15	MF	OMA	Abdulaziz Al-Khalidi
16	MF	OMA	Al-Muhannad Al-Breiki
17	DF	OMA	Juma Al-Zaabi
18	DF	OMA	Wael Al-Saadi

No.	Pos.	Nation	Player
20	DF	OMA	Ammar Al-Sharqi
22	GK	OMA	Mubarak Al-Khalidi
23	GK	OMA	Sulaiman Al-Buraiki
24	MF	OMA	Hamad Al-Fazari
25	DF	OMA	Marwan Al-Ghafri
27	DF	OMA	Abdul Majeed Al-Yahmadi
29	FW	OMA	Salem Al-Abdulsalam
34	MF	OMA	Ahmed Al-Hosani
36	MF	OMA	Saeed Al-Muraikhi
37	FW	OMA	Waleed Al-Saadi
44	FW	LES	Nkoto Masoabi
47	FW	NGA	Tunde Adeniji
48	DF	OMA	Amran Al-Hidi
49	MF	ALG	Rachid Aït-Atmane
99	FW	OMA	Rabia Al-Mamari

== Personnel ==
=== Current technical staff ===
Position	Name
Head coach	(Serbia) Branko Smiljanić
Assistant coach	(Bolivia) Víctor Miguel Urbano
Goalkeeping coach	(Bolivia) György Kocsis Molnár
Team Manager	(Oman) Aiman Al-Farsi
Team Supervisor	(Bolivia) István Kovács Böőr
Medical Director	(Paraguay) Juan Constantín Estoiloff Bogatinoff
Physiotherapist	
Club doctor	

== See also ==
- List of football clubs in Oman
