= Sultan Qaboos Cup =

- Founded: 1972; 54 years ago
- Country: Oman
- Confederation: AFC
- Number of clubs: 32
- Current champions: Al-Nahda (2nd title) (2025–26)
- Most championships: Dhofar (11 titles)
- Broadcaster: Oman Sports TV
- Current: 2025–26 Sultan Qaboos Cup

The Sultan Qaboos Cup (Arabic: كأس السلطان قابوس), also known as the HM's Cup, is Oman's premier knockout tournament for men's football. It was officially founded in 1972, and Al-Ahli won the inaugural edition. It was briefly known as Oman Cup. The most successful club in the Cup competition is Dhofar (11 titles), with their latest win at the 2023–24 season.

== Sponsorship ==
On 4 March 2015, Oman's leading financial services provider, BankMuscat agreed to be the presenting partner for the 2014–15 Sultan Qaboos Cup.

== Championship history ==
=== Year by year ===
Season	Champion	Runner-up	Score
1972	Al-Ahli (1)		
1973	Sur (1)		
1974	Al-Tali'aa (1)		
1975	Fanja (1)		
1976	Fanja (2)		
1977	Dhofar (1)		
1978	Fanja (3)		
1979	Oman (1)		
1980	Dhofar (2)		
1981	Dhofar (3)		
1982	Al-Ahli (2)		
1983	Al-Ahli (3)		
1984	Al-Ahli (4)	Dhofar	3–0
1985	Fanja (4)	Al-Ahli	3–0
1986	Fanja (5)	Al-Nasr	3–1
1987	Fanja (6)	Al-Nasr	2–1
1988	Al-Ahli (5)	Al-Nasr	1–0
1989	Fanja (7)		
1990	Dhofar (4)		
1991	Fanja (8)		
1992	Sur (2)		
1993	Al-Orouba (1)	Dhofar	
1994	Oman (2)		
1995	Al-Nasr (1)	Al-Ahli	
1996	Al-Seeb (1)		
1997	Al-Seeb (2)	Al-Orouba	
1998	Al-Seeb (3)	Al-Ahli	
1999	Dhofar (5)	Al-Nasr	
2000	Al-Nasr (2)	Al-Orouba	
2001	Al-Orouba (2)	Al-Nasr	
2002	Al-Nasr (3)	Dhofar	
2003	Ruwi (1)	Al-Seeb	
2004	Dhofar (6)	Muscat	1–0
2005	Al-Nasr (4)	Al-Seeb	3–1
2006	Dhofar (7)	Sur	2–1
2007	Sur (3)	Muscat	1–1 a.e.t. (5–4 pen.)
2008	Al-Suwaiq (1)	Al-Nahda	1–0
2009	Saham (1)	Dhofar	2–2 a.e.t. (7–6 pen.)
2010	Al-Orouba (3)	Fanja	1–1 a.e.t. (5–3 pen.)
2011	Dhofar (8)	Al-Ittihad	2–0
2012–13	Al-Suwaiq (2)	Al-Nahda	2–0
2013–14	Fanja (9)	Al-Nahda	2–0
2014–15	Al-Orouba (4)	Sur	2–0
2015–16	Saham (2)	Al-Khaboura	1–0
2016–17	Al-Suwaiq (3)	Dhofar	2–0
2017–18	Al-Nasr (5)	Sohar	2–2 a.e.t. (6–5 pen.)
2018–19	Sur (4)	Fanja	2–1 a.e.t.
2019–20	Dhofar (9)	Al-Orouba	0–0 a.e.t. (5–4 pen.)
2020–21	Dhofar (10)	Al-Suwaiq	5–1
2021–22	Al-Seeb (4)	Al-Rustaq	2-0
2022–23	Al-Nahda (1)	Al-Seeb	1–0
2023–24	Dhofar (11)	Al-Nahda	2–0
2024–25	Al-Shabab (1)	Al-Seeb	1–0
2025–26	Al-Nahda (2)	Oman	2–0

=== Cities ===
The following table lists the Sultan Qaboos Cup champions by cities.

City	Titles	Winning clubs
Salalah	16	Dhofar (11), Al-Nasr (5)
Fanja	9	Fanja (9)
Sur	9	Al-Orouba (4), Sur (4), Al-Tali'aa (1)
Muscat	7	Al-Seeb (4), Oman (2), Muscat (1)
Sidab	5	Al-Ahli (5)
Al-Suwaiq	3	Al-Suwaiq (3)
Saham	2	Saham (2)
Al Buraimi	2	Al-Nahda (2)
Barka	1	Al-Shabab (1)

=== Performance by club ===
Club	Winners	Runners-up	Winning seasons
Dhofar	11	5	1977, 1980, 1981, 1990, 1999, 2004, 2006, 2011, 2019–20, 2020–21, 2023–24
Fanja	9	2	1975, 1976, 1978, 1985, 1986, 1987, 1989, 1991, 2013–14
Al-Ahli	5	3	1972, 1982, 1983, 1984, 1988
Al-Nasr	5	5	1995, 2000, 2002, 2005, 2017–18
Al-Orouba	4	3	1993, 2001, 2010, 2014–15
Sur	4	2	1973, 1992, 2007, 2018–19
Al-Seeb	4	4	1996, 1997, 1998, 2021–22
Al-Suwaiq	3	1	2008, 2012–13, 2016–17
Oman	2	0	1979, 1994
Saham	2	0	2009, 2015–16
Al-Nahda	2	4	2022–23, 2025–26
Muscat^{*}	1	2	2003
Al-Tali'aa	1	0	1974
Al-Shabab	1	0	2024–25
Al Rustaq	0	1	
Al-Khaboura	0	1	

^{*}Includes championships won by Ruwi.

== See also ==
- Oman Professional League
- Oman Professional League Cup
- Oman Super Cup
