= Oman Club =

Omani sports club

- Full name: Oman Club
- Nicknames: Al-Ahmar (The Red(s))
- Founded: 1942; 84 years ago
- Ground: Sultan Qaboos Sports Complex; Royal Oman Police Stadium; Boshar, Muscat, Oman
- Capacity: 28,000; 12,000
- Manager: Mustapha Kioua
- League: Oman Elite League
- 2025–26: 6th of 12
Home colours	Away colours

Oman Club (Arabic: نادي عمان; also known locally as Al-Ahmar, "The Red(s)" or simply as Oman) is an Omani professional football club based in Muscat. The club currently plays in the First Division League of Oman Football Association. Their home ground is Sultan Qaboos Sports Complex. The club also recognizes the older Royal Oman Police Stadium as their home ground.

== Players ==
=== First team squad ===
Note: Flags indicate national team as defined under FIFA eligibility rules; some limited exceptions apply. Players may hold more than one non-FIFA nationality.

No.	Pos.	Nation	Player
2	DF	OMA	Majeed Al-Balushi
3	DF	OMA	Waleed Al-Yahyaei
5	DF	OMA	Saud Ali Al-Habsi
6	MF	OMA	Abdulrahman Al-Fouri
8	MF	OMA	Mahmood Al-Hasani
11	MF	OMA	Adnan Al-Ruqadi
12	DF	OMA	Basel Al-Jabri
13	FW	OMA	Abdul Waheed Al-Hinai
14	FW	IRI	Adel Arghand
15	FW	OMA	Mohammed Al-Ghafri
16	DF	OMA	Nooh Suleiman Al-Hinai
17	DF	OMA	Omar Al-Hasani
18	MF	IRI	Alireza Bavieh
19	MF	OMA	Ali Al-Balushi
20	DF	OMA	Basil Al-Rawahi
21	MF	OMA	Mohamed Al-Maashari
22	DF	OMA	Hassan Salem

No.	Pos.	Nation	Player
23	MF	OMA	Ibrahim Al-Sawwafi
26	MF	ALG	Oussama Aggar
27	FW	OMA	Adel Saeed Al-Shibli
28	DF	OMA	Mohammed Al-Subhi
29	MF	OMA	Hosni Al-Hinai
31	MF	OMA	Yazid Al-Rawahi
32	FW	ALG	Yazid Rahmoun
33	MF	OMA	Faisal Al-Braiki
35	DF	OMA	Salim Al-Shabibi
50	GK	OMA	Nabeel Al-Mashaikhi
55	GK	OMA	Abdulaziz Al-Hasani
67	DF	OMA	Bassam Salam Al-shein
68	DF	OMA	Salem Al-Abdali
77	MF	OMA	Nasser Al-Rawahi
80	GK	OMA	Faris Al-Ghaithi
99	DF	OMA	Turki Al-Hadidi

== Multisport club ==
Oman Club also has hockey, volleyball, handball, basketball, badminton, squash and chess sections. They also have youth football teams.

== Honours and achievements ==
=== National titles ===
- Omani League
  - Champions (1): 1996–97
  - Runners-up (1): 1995–96
- Sultan Qaboos Cup
  - Winners (2): 1979, 1994

=== International titles ===
- Asian Club Championship
  - Runners-up (1): 1993–94
- Rovers Cup
  - Winners (1): 1995

== Club performance in international competitions ==
=== AFC competitions ===
- Asian Club Championship : 2 appearances

- 1993–94 : Runners-up
- 1998–99 : First Round

- Asian Cup Winners' Cup : 1 appearance

- 1995 : First Round
