= Oman Professional League Cup =

- Founded: 2007
- Country: Oman
- Confederation: AFC
- Number of clubs: 14
- Current champions: Dhofar SCSC
- Most championships: Dhofar SCSC (2 titles)

The Oman Professional League Cup (Arabic: كأس دوري المحترفين عمان) (known as the Mazda Professional Cup for sponsorship reasons), previously known as the Oman Federation Cup, is an Omani football competition. The first edition was played in 2007 and was known as the Oman FA Cup. The competition was not played again until 2012. The competition tends to feature all clubs currently playing in the top flight of Omani football. The Professional League Cup ranks far below the prestigious Sultan Qaboos Cup in terms of domestic competitions.

In 2014, ahead of the 2014-15 Oman Professional League Cup, Oman Football Association announced that Mazda had agreed to be the title sponsor of the 14-team Professional League Cup for four years, during which period it would be known as the Mazda Professional Cup.

== Championship history ==
As of 13 October 2013

=== Year by year ===
| Season | Champion | Runner-up | Score |
|---|---|---|---|
| 2007 | Al-Seeb | Sur | 2 - 1 |
| 2012-13 | Dhofar | Saham | 0 - 0 a.e.t. (5–4 pen.) |
| 2013-14 | Saham | Al-Seeb | 0 - 0 a.e.t. (3–2 pen.) |
| 2014-15 | Fanja | Dhofar | 1 - 1 a.e.t. (8–7 pen.) |
| 2015-16 | Al-Nasr | Sohar | 2 - 0 |
| 2016-17 | Al-Nahda | Al-Nasr | 1 - 2 |
| 2017-18 | Al-Shabab | Al-Nahda | 2 - 1 a.e.t. |
| 2018-19 | Dhofar | Al-Shabab | 2 - 1 |
| 2019-20 | | | - |
| 2021-22 | Bahla Club | Oman Club | 1 - 1 a.e.t. (6–5 pen.) |
| 2022-23 | Al-Seeb | Bahla Club | 0 - 0 a.e.t. (6–5 pen.) |
| 2023-24 | Al-Seeb | Bahla Club | 0 - 0 a.e.t. (5–4 pen.) |
| 2024-25 | Al-Seeb | Bahla Club | 2 - 1 |
| 2025-26 | Sohar SC | Al-Nahda | 1 - 0 |

=== Cities ===
The following table lists the Omani League champions by cities.

| City | Titles | Winning clubs |
|---|---|---|
| Salalah | 3 | Dhofar (2), Al Nasr (1) |
| Seeb | 2 | Al-Seeb (2) |
| Bahla | 1 | Bahla Club (1) |
| Barka | 1 | Al-Shabab (1) |
| Al-Buraimi | 1 | Al-Nahda (1) |
| Fanja | 1 | Fanja (1) |
| Saham | 1 | Saham (1) |

=== Performance by club ===
| Club | Winners | Runners-up | Winning seasons |
|---|---|---|---|
| Al-Seeb | 4 | 1 | 2007, 2023, 2024, 2025 |
| Dhofar SCSC | 2 | 1 | 2013, 2019 |
| Saham SC | 1 | 1 | 2013-14 |
| Al-Nasr SCSC | 1 | 1 | 2015-16 |
| Al-Nahda SC | 1 | 1 | 2016-17 |
| Al-Shabab SC | 1 | 1 | 2017-18 |
| Bahla Club | 1 | 3 | 2022 |
| Fanja SC | 1 | 0 | 2014-15 |
| Sur SC | 0 | 1 | |
| Sohar SC | 0 | 1 | |
| Oman Club | 0 | 1 | |

== See also ==
- Oman Professional League
- Sultan Qaboos Cup
- Oman Super Cup
