= Al-Shabab SC (Seeb) =

Omani sports club

Al-Shabab
- Full name: Al-Shabab Club
- Nicknames: Al-Shababi (The Youth(s))
- Founded: 2003; 23 years ago
- Ground: Al-Seeb Stadium; Barka, Oman
- Capacity: 14,000
- Chairman: Sheikh Hamza Abdulraheem Al-Balushi
- Manager: Eelco Schattorie
- League: Oman Professional League
- 2025–26: Oman Professional League, 2nd of 14
Home colours	Away colours

Al-Shabab Club (Arabic: نادي الشباب) is an Omani multi-sports club based in Barka. Their professional football section currently plays in the Oman Professional League, the top division of the Oman Football Association. Their home ground is Al-Seeb Stadium.

== Other sections ==
Although being mainly known for their football, Al-Shabab Club also has hockey, volleyball, handball, basketball, badminton and squash sections. They also have a youth football team competing in the Omani Youth League.

== Players ==
=== First team squad ===
Note: Flags indicate national team as defined under FIFA eligibility rules; some limited exceptions apply. Players may hold more than one non-FIFA nationality.

No.	Pos.	Nation	Player
2	DF	OMA	Majeed Al-Balushi
3	DF	OMA	Waleed Al-Yahyaei
5	DF	OMA	Saud Ali Al-Habsi
6	MF	OMA	Abdulrahman Al-Fouri
8	MF	OMA	Mahmood Al-Hasani
11	MF	OMA	Adnan Al-Ruqadi
12	DF	OMA	Basel Al-Jabri
13	FW	OMA	Abdul Waheed Al-Hinai
16	DF	OMA	Nooh Suleiman Al-Hinai
17	DF	OMA	Omar Al-Hasani
18	MF	OMA	Shouqi Al-Ruqadi
19	MF	OMA	Ali Al-Balushi
20	DF	OMA	Basil Al-Rawahi
21	MF	OMA	Mohamed Al-Maashari

No.	Pos.	Nation	Player
22	DF	OMA	Hassan Salem
23	MF	OMA	Ibrahim Al-Sawwafi
27	FW	OMA	Adel Saeed Al-Shibli
28	DF	OMA	Mohammed Al-Subhi
29	MF	OMA	Hosni Al-Hinai
31	MF	OMA	Yazid Al-Rawahi
33	MF	OMA	Faisal Al-Braiki
35	DF	OMA	Salim Al-Shabibi
50	GK	OMA	Nabeel Al-Mashaikhi
55	GK	OMA	Abdulaziz Al-Hasani
67	DF	OMA	Bassam Salam Al-Shein
68	DF	OMA	Salem Al-Abdali
77	MF	OMA	Nasser Al-Rawahi
80	GK	OMA	Faris Al-Ghaithi
99	DF	OMA	Turki Al-Hadidi

== Personnel ==
=== Technical staff ===
Position	Name
Manager	(Netherlands) Eelco Schattorie
Goalkeeping coach	(Oman) Maqbool Al-Balushi
Team manager	(Oman) Abdulkareem Al-Farsi
Team manager	(Oman) Juma Bani Abdraboh
Doctor	(Oman) Mashaka Yaqoob
Fitness coach	(Oman) Talib Al-Qasmi
Fitness coach	(Oman) Ahmed Adil
Youth manager	(Oman) Husain Rustam
Youth assistant manager	(Oman) Abdulaziz Al-Tarshi

=== Management ===
Position	Staff
Chairman	(Oman) Sheikh Hamza Abdulraheem Al-Balushi
General secretary	(Oman) Ala'a Al-Riyami
Vice-president	(Oman) Khalid Al-Yahmadi

== Continental record ==
- GCC Champions League: 1 appearance

- 2012–13: Group stage

- AFC Challenge League: 1 appearance

- 2025–26: Quarter-final

== Honours and achievements ==
=== National titles ===
- League (2):

- Runners-up 2011–12, 2017–18

- Sultan Qaboos Cup (1): 2024–25
- Oman Professional League Cup (1):

- Winners 2017–18

- Oman Super Cup (1):

- Winners 2025

== Presidential history ==
Name	From	To
(Oman) Sheikh Abdulmoneim Abudllah Al-Farsi	2003	2004
(Oman) Sheikh Sulaiman Hamoud Al-Busaidi	2005	2012
(Oman) Sheikh Hamza Abdulraheem Al-Balushi	2012	present

== See also ==
- List of football clubs in Oman
