= Sur SC =

Omani sports club

Sur SC نادي صور الرياضي
- Full name: Sur Sports Club
- Founded: 1969; 57 years ago
- Ground: Sur Sports Complex; Sur, Oman
- Capacity: 8,000
- Manager: Georgi Raev
- League: Oman Professional League
- 2025–26: Oman Professional League, 8th of 14
Home colours	Away colours

Sur Sports Club (Arabic: نادي صور الرياضي) is an Omani sports club based in Sur. The club currently plays in the Oman Professional League, top division of Oman Football Association. Their home stadium is Sur Sports Complex. The stadium is government owned, but they also own their personal stadium and sports equipment, as well as their own training facilities.

== Notable coaches ==
- (South Africa) (Italy) Eddie Firmani (1992–93)
- (Egypt) Ashraf Kasem (2013)
- (Romania) Petre Gigiu (2014)
- (Bulgaria) Velizar Popov (2013–2014, 2018)

== Domestic records ==
- Omani League
  - Winners: 1994–95, 1995–96
  - Runners-up: 1996–97, 1997–98, 2001–02
- Sultan Qaboos Cup
  - Winners: 1973, 1992, 2007, 2019
  - Runners-up: 2006, 2014–15
- Omani Federation Cup
  - Runners-up: 2007
- Oman Super Cup
  - Runners-up: 2008, 2019
- Oman First Division League
  - Winners: 2010–11

== Performance in international competitions ==
=== AFC competitions ===
- Asian Club Championship: *1997–98: First Round
- AFC Cup: *2008: Group stage

- 2020: Play-off round

=== UAFA competitions ===
- Gulf Club Champions Cup: *2009–10: Group stage

== Continental record ==
Season	Competition	Round	Club	Home	Away	Aggregate
1997–98	Asian Club Championship	First round	(Iraq) Al-Zawraa	0–5	0–4	0–9
2008	AFC Cup	Group A	(Bahrain) Al-Muharraq	2–2	3–2	4th
2008	AFC Cup	Group A	(India) Dempo	3–2	5–2	4th
2008	AFC Cup	Group A	(Lebanon) Al Ansar	0–2	1–0	4th
2020	AFC Cup	Play-off round	(Palestine) Hilal Al-Quds	0–0	2–0	2–0

== Players (2025) ==
Note: Flags indicate national team as defined under FIFA eligibility rules; some limited exceptions apply. Players may hold more than one non-FIFA nationality.

No.	Pos.	Nation	Player
1	GK	OMA	Ahmed Al-Araimi
2	MF	OMA	Khamis Al Gheilani
4	DF	OMA	Mana Sbeit
5	DF	OMA	Badar Khamis
6	DF	OMA	Shehab Al-Mukhaini
7	MF	OMA	Aiman Ibrahim
8	MF	OMA	Sami Al-Hasani
9	FW	OMA	Hamid Juma Al-Wahaibi
10	MF	OMA	Thwaini Hadid
11	FW	OMA	Mohammed Naser
15	FW	TOG	Axel Méyé
16	FW	OMA	Waleed Al-Saadi
17	FW	CMR	Arsène Loko
18	MF	OMA	Abdul Rahman Juma
20	MF	OMA	Mohammed Al-Owaisi
21	MF	OMA	Hisham Al-Shuaibi

No.	Pos.	Nation	Player
24	MF	OMA	Hamad Al-Mukhaini
25	FW	NGR	Tunde Adeniji
27	MF	OMA	Yousef Al-Mukhaini
30	FW	OMA	Abdullah Abdul-Hadi
32	DF	OMA	Abdul Rahman Al-Breiki
34	FW	OMA	Moahamed Rabeea
35	DF	OMA	Yahya Al-Hudaifi
44	GK	OMA	Bilal Al-Balushi
55	DF	OMA	Fahad Al-Hajeri
74	GK	OMA	Sanad Al-Mukhaini
77	MF	OMA	Saud Al-Farsi
80	MF	OMA	Mutasem Al-Muhaijiri
90	DF	NGR	Kingsley Obumneme
92	MF	OMA	Al-Moatasim Al-Mukhaini
99	FW	OMA	Sami Al-Hasani

== Personnel ==
=== Management ===
Position	Staff
Chairman	Hilal Al-Sinani
Vice-president	Rashid Said
General secretary	Said Rabia
Treasurer	Juma Al-Kathiri
Board member	Qais Al-Shihab
Board member	Mohammed Al-Jawi

== See also ==
- List of football clubs in Oman
