= Suwaiq Club =

Omani sports club based in Al-Suwaiq

Al-Suwaiq Club نادي السويق
- Full name: Al-Suwaiq Club
- Short name: Suwaiq
- Founded: 28 February 1972; 54 years ago (as Al-Suwaiq)
- Ground: Al-Seeb Stadium; Al-Seeb, Al-Batinah, Oman
- Capacity: 14,000
- Chairman: Sheikh Fatik bin Fahar Al-Said; Ahmed Al-Farsi
- League: Oman Professional League
| Home colours | Away colours | Third colours |

Al-Suwaiq Club (Arabic: نادي السويق) is an Omani sports club based in Al-Suwaiq. Their professional football section currently plays in the Oman Professional League, the top division of the Oman Football Association. Their home ground is Al-Seeb Stadium.

== History ==
The club was founded on 28 February 1972 and was registered on 26 June 2002.

== Being a multisport club ==
Although being mainly known for their football, Al-Suwaiq Club have not only football in their list, but also hockey, volleyball, handball, basketball, badminton and squash.

== Honours ==
=== Domestic ===
- Oman Elite League
  - Champions (4): 2009–10, 2010–11, 2012–13, 2017–18
- Sultan Qaboos Cup
  - Winners (3): 2008, 2012, 2017
- Oman Super Cup
  - Winners (1): 2013
  - Runners-up (5): 2009, 2010, 2011, 2017, 2018

== Continental record ==
- AFC Champions League: 1 appearance
  - 2014: Qualifying Play-Off Round 1
- AFC Cup: 7 appearances
  - 2009: Group stage
  - 2011: Group stage
  - 2012: Round of 16
  - 2014: Group stage
  - 2017: Group stage
  - 2018: Group stage
  - 2019: Group stage

| Season | Competition | Round | Club | Home | Away | Aggregate |
|---|---|---|---|---|---|---|
| 2009 | AFC Cup | Group B | (Lebanon) Safa | 0–1 | 1–0 | 4th |
| 2009 | AFC Cup | Group B | (Yemen) Al-Hilal Al-Sahili | 3–1 | 2–0 | 4th |
| 2009 | AFC Cup | Group B | (Iraq) Al-Zawraa | 0–1 | 2–0 | 4th |
| 2011 | AFC Cup | Group D | Al-Kuwait | 1–3 | 0–0 | 4th |
| 2011 | AFC Cup | Group D | (Jordan) Al-Wehdat | 1–1 | 5–1 | 4th |
| 2011 | AFC Cup | Group D | (Iraq) Al-Talaba | 1–2 | 1–1 | 4th |
| 2012 | AFC Cup | Group A | (Kuwait) Al-Qadsia | 1–5 | 2–0 | 2nd |
| 2012 | AFC Cup | Group A | (Jordan) Al-Faisaly | 0–0 | 2–3 | 2nd |
| 2012 | AFC Cup | Group A | (Syria) Al-Ittihad | 2–0 | 0–2 | 2nd |
| 2012 | AFC Cup | Round of 16 | (Saudi Arabia) Al-Ettifaq | 1–0 | | |
| 2014 | AFC Champions League | Qualifying play-off | (Kuwait) Al-Qadsia | 0–1 | | |
| 2014 | AFC Cup | Group A | (Tajikistan) Ravshan Kulob | 3–1 | 0–5 | 3rd |
| 2014 | AFC Cup | Group A | (Jordan) That Ras | 0–0 | 1–0 | 3rd |
| 2014 | AFC Cup | Group A | (Lebanon) Safa | 0–1 | 1–0 | 3rd |
| 2017 | AFC Cup | Play-off round | (Palestine) Shabab Al-Khalil | 3–1 | 2–1 | 3–4 |
| 2017 | AFC Cup | Group A | (Iraq) Al-Zawraa | 0–1 | 0–0 | 4th |
| 2017 | AFC Cup | Group A | (Syria) Al-Jaish | 0–1 | 1–2 | 4th |
| 2017 | AFC Cup | Group A | (Jordan) Al-Ahli | 0–0 | 2–1 | 4th |
| 2018 | AFC Cup | Play-off round | (Palestine) Hilal Al-Quds | 1–1 | 0–1 | 1–2 |
| 2018 | AFC Cup | Group A | (Bahrain) Malkiya | 1–2 | 4–1 | 4th |
| 2018 | AFC Cup | Group A | (Iraq) Al-Quwa Al-Jawiya | 0–1 | 2–0 | 4th |
| 2018 | AFC Cup | Group A | (Jordan) Al-Jazeera | 2–3 | 4–0 | 4th |
| 2019 | AFC Cup | Group C | (Bahrain) Malkiya | 1–2 | 2–2 | 4th |
| 2019 | AFC Cup | Group C | (Kuwait) Al-Qadsia | 2–1 | 2–0 | 4th |
| 2019 | AFC Cup | Group C | (Lebanon) Al-Ahed | 0–1 | 4–2 | 4th |

== See also ==
- List of football clubs in Oman
