= Al-Seeb Stadium =

Association football stadium in Seeb, Oman

- ملعب السيب الرياضي
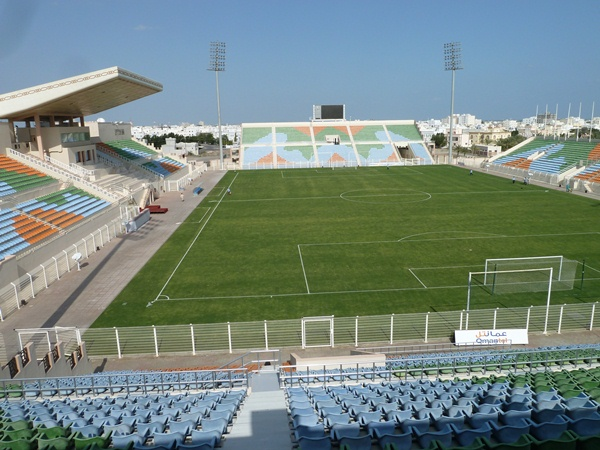
- Interior of the stadium
- Interactive map of Al-Seeb Stadium
- Location: Seeb, Oman
- Coordinates: 23.618°N 58.216°E
- Owner: Government
- Capacity: 14.000
- Surface: Grass

Construction
- Opened: 2004

Tenants
- Al-Seeb; Suwaiq Club; Oman national football team

Al-Seeb Stadium is a multi-use stadium in Seeb, Oman. It is currently used mostly for football matches, and is the home stadium of Al-Seeb Club. The stadium can accommodate 14,000 spectators.

== History ==
The national teams of both Oman and Syria used the stadium as one of their home grounds for 2018 FIFA World Cup qualifying matches.

== See also ==
- List of football stadiums in Oman
