= 2019–20 Bashundhara Kings season =

Bashundhara Kings
2019–20 season
- Owner: Bashundhara Group
- President: Imrul Hassan
- Head coach: Óscar Bruzón
- Stadium: Sheikh Kamal Stadium, Nilphamari
- Bangladesh Premier League: 6th (season cancelled)
- Federation Cup: Winners
- Top goalscorer: League: Daniel Colindres(3); All: Daniel Colindres(6)
- Biggest win: Bashundhara Kings 5-1 (Maldives) TC Sports Club (11 March 2020)
- Biggest defeat: Bashundhara Kings 0-2 Chittagong Abahani (27 December 2019)

The 2019–20 season is the Bashundhara Kings's 3rd professional season since its creation in 2013, and its second consecutive season in the top-flight of Bangladesh football. The season began on 13 February 2020 and was suspended on 15 March 2020 due to the COVID-19 pandemic. On 17 May 2020, the league was declared void by the BFF executive committee.

== Summary ==
On 3 September 2019, Kings took another step in their bid to bolster their star-studded squad for the upcoming season by completing the signing of rising Lebanon international striker Mohamed Jalal Kdouh. On 22 October 2019, Gokulam Kerala FC of India made a flying start in the eight-team 2019 Sheikh Kamal International Club Cup, upsetting Kings by 3-1 goals in their first match. On 24 October 2019, the Bashundhara Kings clinched their first win of the Sheikh Kamal International Club Cup after beating nine-man Chennai City FC 3–2 in an eventful encounter where four red cards were splashed on and off the pitch, including the head coaches of the two teams. On 26 October 2019, the Bashundhara Kings were ruled out of the tournament after losing to Terengganu FC 4–2 in their must-win match of the final group round fixtures.

On 7 November 2019, it was revealed that the Kings signed Bangladesh-origin Finland right-back Tariq Kazi to bolster their defense for the upcoming season.

On 19 December 2019, the Bashundhara Kings began their TVS Federation Cup 2019 campaign with a 1–0 win over Brothers Union. New signing Lebanese striker Mohamed Jalal Kdouh netted the all-important goal in the opening half. On 3 January 2020, the Kings reached the final of the Bangladesh Federation Cup, eliminating newcomers Bangladesh Police FC by 3-0 goals in the second semifinal. On 5 January 2020, Daniel Colindres scored twice as the Bashundhara Kings clinched the title of the Federation Cup for the first time following a 2–1 win over Rahmatganj MFS in the final. The achievement also ensured Bashundhara's play-off berth in next season's AFC Cup. Daniel Colindres was named player of the tournament.

On 2 February 2020, it was revealed that former Argentina international Hernan Barcos will be playing for Bangladesh Premier League champions Bashundhara Kings in their upcoming AFC Cup campaign and the second phase of the league, confirmed club president Imrul Hassan.

On 13 February 2020, defending champions Bashundhara Kings managed a hard-fought 1-0 goal victory over newcomers Uttar Baridhara Club in the opening match of the Bangladesh Premier League (BPL) at their home venue at Sheikh Kamal Stadium in Nilphamari.

On 11 March 2020, Argentine striker Hernan Barcos made a remarkable debut in Bangladesh with a sensational quadruple as the Bashundhara Kings kicked off their maiden 2020 AFC Cup campaign from Group E with a dominating 5–1 win over TC Sports Club. Barcos, who featured for Argentina four times, headed his first two goals within half an hour before netting two more after the break, while skipper Daniel Colindres added the other to record Bashundhara's biggest win of the season. It was arguably the best performance of the season from the Kings, whose goalkeeper Anisur Rahman Zico also starred in between the posts by making three penalty saves, one of which was scored on the rebound during Easa Ismail's equalizer, while the other was retaken and saved again with a dive to his left.

On 17 May 2020, the BFF executive committee, following an emergency meeting, declared the 12th edition of the league abandoned, scrapping promotion and relegation while canceling the Independence Cup from the calendar as a precaution to combat the spread of coronavirus in the country. On 10 June 2020, the Bashundhara Kings released their Costa Rican World-Cupper Daniel Colindres after a nearly two-year stint with the club.

On 5 August 2020, the Bashundhara Kings announced their new signing Robson Azevedo da Silva for the AFC Cup and the forthcoming football season, as the Brazilian winger is all set to join the Bangladesh side on loan from Fluminense FC for a year. On 21 August 2020, midfielder Jonathan da Silveira Fernandes, better known as Fernandes, joined the Bashundhara Kings. He last played for Brazilian top-tier outfit Botafogo.

On 10 September 2020, the Kings' journey in their debut AFC Cup campaign ended after just a single match. Kings took pole position in Group E with a 5–1 thrashing of TC Sports of Maldives in their opening fixture on 11 March, but the Bangladesh giants' campaign stalled when coronavirus spread throughout the continent, forcing the AFC to reschedule the remaining group matches at centralised venues before its cancellation.

== Current squad ==
As of 20 November 2019

Note: Flags indicate national team as defined under FIFA eligibility rules; some limited exceptions apply. Players may hold more than one non-FIFA nationality.

No.	Pos.	Nation	Player
1	GK	BAN	Mitul Hasan
2	DF	BAN	Sushanto Tripura
3	DF	BAN	Nurul Naium Faisal
4	DF	BAN	Yeasin Khan
5	DF	BAN	Topu Barman
6	MF	BAN	Emon Mahmud Babu
7	MF	BAN	Masuk Mia Jony
8	MF	BAN	Rabiul Hasan
9	FW	BAN	Motin Mia
10	FW	BAN	Tawhidul Alam Sabuz
11	MF	BAN	Biplu Ahmed
12	DF	BAN	Bishwanath Ghosh
13	MF	BAN	Atiqur Rahman Fahad
14	FW	BAN	Rasel Ahmed
17	FW	BAN	Mahbubur Rahman Sufil
18	MF	BAN	Sheikh Alamgir Kabir Rana
19	MF	BAN	Mohammad Ibrahim

No.	Pos.	Nation	Player
20	MF	KGZ	Bakhtiyar Duyshobekov
21	MF	BAN	Omar Faruk Mithu
22	GK	BAN	Anisur Rahman Zico
24	DF	BAN	Jahangir Alam Sajeeb
25	GK	BAN	Maksudur Rahman Mostak
26	FW	CRC	Daniel Colindres (captain)
27	FW	BAN	Nihat Jaman Ucchash
28	DF	BAN	Monir Hossain
35	DF	ARG	Nicolás Delmonte
36	GK	BAN	Hamidur Rahman Remon
40	DF	BAN	Tariq Kazi
52	DF	BAN	Hakim Biswas
69	MF	BAN	Foayej Ahammed
71	FW	BAN	Rimon Hossain
91	DF	TJK	Akhtam Nazarov
99	MF	BAN	Fahim Morshed
—	FW	ARG	Hernán Barcos

== Pre-season and friendlies ==
Win Draw Loss

=== Group B ===
22 October 2019 Sheikh Kamal International Club Cup 2019	Bashundhara Kings (Bangladesh)	1–3	(India) Gokulam Kerala F.C.	Chittagong, Bangladesh
19:00	Mia 74'	Report	Kisekka 25', 46'; García 31'	Stadium: M. A. Aziz Stadium; Referee: Shraban Kumar Tamang (Nepal)

24 October 2019 Sheikh Kamal International Club Cup 2019	Bashundhara Kings (Bangladesh)	3–2	(India) Chennai City FC	Chittagong, Bangladesh
16:00	Kdouh 6', 88'; Duyshobekov 59'	Report	Manzi 43'; Shereef 71'	Stadium: M. A. Aziz Stadium; Referee: Lakmal Weerakkody (Sri Lanka)

26 October 2019 Sheikh Kamal International Club Cup 2019	Bashundhara Kings (Bangladesh)	2-4	Terengganu F.C. (Malaysia)	Chittagong
19:00 BST	Colindres 27'; Kdouh 83'	Report	Tuck 45+1' (pen.), 45+3' (pen.), 75'; Alias 78'	Stadium: M. A. Aziz Stadium; Referee: Sudish Kumar Pandey (All India Football Federation)

=== Friendly ===
14 December 2019 Friendly	Bashundhara Kings	3-0	Rahmatganj MFS	Bangladesh
14:30 BST				Stadium: Bashundhara Sports Complex

== Competition ==
=== Overview ===
Competition	First match	Last match	Starting round	Final position	Record							
Competition	First match	Last match	Starting round	Final position	Pld	W	D	L	GF	GA	GD	Win %
BPL	13 February 2020	15 March 2020	Matchday 1	6th(season cancelled)	6	3	1	2	10	9	+1	50.00
Federation Cup	19 December 2019	5 January 2020	Group stage	Winner	5	4	0	1	7	4	+3	80.00
Independence Cup	-	-	Not held	-	0	0	0	0	0	0	+0	—
AFC Cup	11 March 2020		Group stage		1	1	0	0	5	1	+4	100.00
Total					12	8	1	3	22	14	+8	66.67

Last updated: 16 March 2020
Source: NowGoal

=== Federation Cup ===
==== Group B ====
Pos	Team	Pld	W	D	L	GF	GA	GD	Pts	Qualification
1	Chittagong Abahani	2	2	0	0	4	0	+4	6	Quarter-Finals
2	Bashundhara Kings	2	1	0	1	1	2	−1	3	Quarter-Finals
3	Brothers Union	2	0	0	2	0	3	−3	0	

Source: Soccerway

19 December 2019 2019 Bangladesh Federation Group stage	Bashundhara Kings	1-0	Brothers Union	Bangabandhu National Stadium, Dhaka
18:15 BST	Kdouh 22'	Report		Referee: GM Chowdhury Nayan (Bangladesh)

27 December 2019 2019 Bangladesh Federation Cup Group stage	Chittagong Abahani	2-0	Bashundhara Kings	Bangabandhu National Stadium, Dhaka
15:30 BST	Rakib 25'; Brossou 45+2'	Report		Referee: Mizanur Rahman (Bangladesh)

==== Knockout phase ====
31 December 2019 2019 Bangladesh Federation Cup Quarter-Finals	Muktijoddha Sangsad KC	1-1 (a.e.t.) (1-4 p)	Bashundhara Kings	Dhaka
18:15 UTC+6:00	Royel 76'	Report	Kdouh 3'	Stadium: Bangabandhu National Stadium; Referee: GM Chowdhury Nayan (Bangladesh)
	Penalties
	Hashiguchi (penalty missed); Tariqul (penalty missed); Biyaga (penalty scored)		Duyshobekov (penalty scored); Delmonte (penalty scored); Fahad (penalty scored); Colindres (penalty scored)

3 January 2020 2019 Bangladesh Federation Cup Semi-Finals	Bangladesh Police FC	0-3	Bashundhara Kings	Dhaka
18:30 BST		Report	Barman 16'; Colindres 49'; Delmonte 90+2'	Stadium: Bangabandhu National Stadium; Referee: Saymoon Hasan Sany (Bangladesh)

5 January 2020 2019 Bangladesh Federation Cup Final	Rahmatganj MFS	1-2	Bashundhara Kings	Dhaka
16:00 BST	Bah 63'	Report	Colindres 41', 76'	Stadium: Bangabandhu National Stadium; Referee: TBC

=== AFC Cup ===
==== Group E ====
Pos	Team	Pld	W	D	L	GF	GA	GD	Pts	BAS	MAZ	CHE	TCS
1	(Bangladesh) Bashundhara Kings	1	1	0	0	5	1	+4	3	—	~~4 Nov~~	~~29 Oct~~	5–1
2	(Maldives) Maziya	1	0	1	0	2	2	0	1 (Note: Head-to-head away goals: Maziya 2, Chennai City 0.)	~~23 Oct~~	—	~~1 Nov~~	~~26 Oct~~
3	(India) Chennai City	1	0	1	0	2	2	0	1	~~26 Oct~~	2–2	—	~~4 Nov~~
4	(Maldives) TC Sports	1	0	0	1	1	5	−4	0	~~1 Nov~~	~~29 Oct~~	~~23 Oct~~	—

Source: AFC
Rules for classification: Tiebreakers
Notes:

11 March 2020 1	Bashundhara Kings (Bangladesh)	5-1	(Maldives) TC Sports Club	Dhaka
15:30 UTC+6:00	Barcos 18', 26', 68' (pen.), 90+2'; Colindres 76'	Report	Hassan 21'	Stadium: Bangabandhu National Stadium; Attendance: 4,200; Referee: Shaun Evans (Australia)

14 April 2019 2	Maziya S&RC (Maldives)	Cancelled	(Bangladesh) Bashundhara Kings	Malé
17:00 UTC+6:00		Report		Stadium: National Football Stadium

29 April 2020 3	Chennai City (India)	Cancelled	(Bangladesh) Bashundhara Kings	Chennai
20:00 UTC+6:00		Report		Stadium: Jawaharlal Nehru Stadium

=== Premier League ===
==== League table ====
Pos	Team	Pld	W	D	L	GF	GA	GD	Pts
4	Dhaka Mohammedan SC Ltd.	6	4	0	2	8	7	+1	12
5	Saif Sporting Club	6	3	2	1	8	5	+3	11
6	Bashundhara Kings	6	3	1	2	10	9	+1	10
7	Rahmatganj MFS	6	2	1	3	6	5	+1	7
8	Arambagh KS	5	1	2	2	6	9	−3	5

Source: Soccerway
Rules for classification: 1) Points; 2) Goal difference; 3) Goals scored.

==== Results summary ====
Overall								Home						Away					
Pld	W	D	L	GF	GA	GD	Pts	W	D	L	GF	GA	GD	W	D	L	GF	GA	GD
6	3	1	2	10	9	+1	10	1	0	1	4	4	0	2	1	1	6	5	+1

Last updated: 16 March 2020.
Source: Soccerway

==== Results by round ====
Round	1	2	3	4	5	6	7	8	9	10	11	12	13	14	15	16	17	18	19	20	21	22	23	24	25	26
Ground	H	A	A	A	A	H																				
Result	W	D	W	W	L	L																				
Position	3	3	2	3	4	6																				

Updated to match(es) played on 15 March 2020. Source: Matches
A = Away; H = Home; W = Win; D = Draw; L = Loss; P = Postponed

==== Matches ====
13 February 2020 1	Bashundhara Kings	1-0	Uttar Baridhara	Nilphamari, Bangladesh
15:30 BST	Colindres 86'	Report		Stadium: Sheikh Kamal Stadium; Referee: J. Uddin

20 February 2020 2	Bangladesh Police FC	1-1	Bashundhara Kings	Dhaka, Bangladesh
16:00 BST	Faisal 74' (o.g.)	Report	Sabuz 54'	Stadium: Bangabandhu National Stadium; Referee: Shohrab Hossain (Bangladesh)

25 February 2020 3	Brothers Union	2-3	Bashundhara Kings	Dhaka, Bangladesh
18:30 BST	Chigozie 63'; Baiyda 76'	Report	Ibrahim 17', 44'; Colindres 47'	Stadium: Bangabandhu National Stadium; Referee: Jalaluddin (Bangladesh)

4 March 2020 4	Rahmatganj MFS	1-2	Bashundhara Kings	Dhaka, Bangladesh
15:30BST	Akobir Turaev 38'	Report	Colindres 4'; Bakhtiyar 45'	Stadium: Bangabandhu National Stadium

7 March 2020 5	Dhaka Mohammedan	1-0	Bashundhara Kings	Comilla, Bangladesh
15:15 BST	Moneke 25'	Report		Stadium: Shaheed Dhirendranath Stadium; Referee: Jalauddin Bangladesh

15 March 2020 6	Bashundhara Kings	3-4	Chittagong Abahani	Nilphamari
15:15 BST	Nazarov 43'; Delmonte 45+3'; Colindres 59'	Report	Brossou 64'; Nixon Guylherme 67', 87' (pen.); Chinedu 90+5'	Stadium: Sheikh Kamal Stadium; Referee: B. Gour (Bangladesh)

== Statistics ==
=== Goalscorers ===
As of match played till 15 March 2020

Rank	Player	Position	Total	BPL	AFC Cup	Federation Cup	Independence Cup
1	(Costa Rica) Daniel Colindres	FW	8	4	1	3	0
2	(Argentina) Hernán Barcos	FW	4	0	4	0	0
3	(Bangladesh) Mohammad Ibrahim	MF	2	2	0	0	0
4	(Lebanon) Mohamad Jalal Kdouh	FW	2	0	0	2	0
5	(Argentina) Nicolás Delmonte	DF	2	1	0	1	0
6	(Bangladesh) Topu Barman	DF	1	0	0	1	0
7	(Bangladesh) Tawhidul Alam Sabuz	FW	1	1	0	0	0
8	(Kyrgyzstan) Bakhtiyar Duyshobekov	MF	1	1	0	0	0
9	(Tajikistan) Akhtam Nazarov	MF	1	1	0	0	0
Total			22	10	5	7	0

Source: Matches
