= 2020 AFC Cup qualifying play-offs =

The 2020 AFC Cup qualifying play-offs were played from 21 January to 26 February 2020, before the remaining matches were suspended, and eventually cancelled by the AFC on 10 September 2020 due to the COVID-19 pandemic. Under the original competition format, a total of 19 teams would compete in the qualifying play-offs to decide seven of the 36 places in the group stage of the 2020 AFC Cup.

== Teams ==
The following 19 teams, split into five zones (West Asia Zone, Central Asia Zone, South Asia Zone, ASEAN Zone, East Asia Zone), entered the qualifying play-offs, consisting of three rounds:

- 2 teams entered in the preliminary round 1.
- 7 teams entered in the preliminary round 2.
- 10 teams entered in the play-off round.

Zone	Teams entering in play-off round	Teams entering in preliminary round 2	Teams entering in preliminary round 1
West Asia Zone	(Oman) Sur; (Palestine) Hilal Al-Quds		
Central Asia Zone	(Tajikistan) Khujand	(Turkmenistan) Ahal; (Kyrgyzstan) Neftchi	
South Asia Zone		(India) Bengaluru; (Maldives) Maziya; (Bangladesh) Abahani Limited Dhaka	(Bhutan) Paro; (Sri Lanka) Defenders
ASEAN Zone	(Indonesia) PSM Makassar; (Myanmar) Yangon United; (Laos) Master 7; (Cambodia) Svay Rieng; (Brunei) Indera; (Timor-Leste) Lalenok United		
East Asia Zone	(Hong Kong) Kitchee (Note: Under the original competition format, Kitchee (Hong Kong) would enter the play-off round, and Taipower (Chinese Taipei) and Ulaanbaatar City (Mongolia) would enter the preliminary round 2. However, Tai Po (Hong Kong) withdrew from the group stage after the draw (originally drawn in Group I). As a result, Kitchee entered the group stage instead of the play-off round to replace Tai Po, and Taipower and Ulaanbaatar City entered the play-off round instead of the preliminary round 2, which was cancelled.)	(Chinese Taipei) Taipower; (Mongolia) Ulaanbaatar City	

== Format ==
In the qualifying play-offs, each tie was played on a home-and-away two-legged basis. The away goals rule, extra time (away goals would not apply in extra time) and penalty shoot-out would be used to decide the winner if necessary (Regulations Article 9.3).

== Schedule ==
The original schedule of each round was as follows.

Round	West Asia		Central Asia		South Asia		ASEAN		East Asia	
Round	First leg	Second leg	First leg	Second leg	First leg	Second leg	First leg	Second leg	First leg	Second leg
Preliminary round 1	Not played		Not played		22 January 2020	29 January 2020	Not played		Not played	
Preliminary round 2	Not played		5 February 2020	12 February 2020	5 February 2020	12 February 2020	Not played		5 February 2020 (cancelled)	12 February 2020 (cancelled)
Play-off round	21 January 2020	28 January 2020	19 February 2020	26 February 2020	19 February 2020	26 February 2020	22 January 2020	29 January 2020	19 February 2020 (cancelled)	26 February 2020 (cancelled)

=== Effects of the COVID-19 pandemic ===
The East Asia Zone preliminary round 2 first leg between Ulaanbaatar City and Taipower, originally scheduled to be played on 5 February 2020 and hosted by Ulaanbaatar City, was not played as scheduled because the Mongolian government had banned Chinese nationals, including people from Taiwan, from entering Mongolia due to the COVID-19 pandemic in Asia.

The AFC announced on 11 February 2020 that the East Asia Zone preliminary round and play-off round matches would be postponed to 7 and 14 April, and 21 and 28 April.

The AFC announced on 18 March 2020 that all matches would be postponed until further notice.

On 9 July 2020, the AFC announced the new schedule for the remaining matches. The tie between Taipower and Ulaanbaatar City, now in the play-off round after Tai Po's withdrawal, would be played as a single match on 30 September, later rescheduled to 16 October, and hosted by Taipower as they were from the higher-ranked association.

The AFC announced the cancellation of the remainder of the competition on 10 September 2020, due to logistics in coordinating the five zones.

== Bracket ==
The bracket of the qualifying play-offs for each zone was determined based on the association ranking of each team, with the team from the higher-ranked association hosting the second leg. The seven winners of the play-off round (one each from West Asia Zone, Central Asia Zone, South Asia Zone, East Asia Zone, and three from ASEAN Zone) would advance to the group stage to join the 29 direct entrants.

=== Play-off West Asia ===
- (Palestine) Hilal Al-Quds advanced to Group A.

Play-off round
(Palestine) Hilal Al-Quds	2	0	2
(Oman) Sur	0	0	0

=== Play-off Central Asia ===
- (Tajikistan) Khujand advanced to Group D.

Preliminary round 2				Play-off round
(Kyrgyzstan) Neftchi	—	—	w/o
(Turkmenistan) Ahal	—	—	—
(Turkmenistan) Ahal	—	—	—	(Kyrgyzstan) Neftchi	1	0	1
				(Tajikistan) Khujand (a.e.t.)	0	3	3

=== Play-off South Asia ===
- (Maldives) Maziya advanced to Group E.

Preliminary round 1
(Sri Lanka) Defenders	3	2	5
(Bhutan) Paro (a)	3	2	5

Preliminary round 2
(Bangladesh) Abahani Limited Dhaka	2	0	2
(Maldives) Maziya (a)	2	0	2
(Bhutan) Paro	0	1	1
(India) Bengaluru	1	9	10

Play-off round
(Maldives) Maziya (p)	2	2	4 (4)
(India) Bengaluru	1	3	4 (3)

=== Play-off ASEAN 1 ===
- (Indonesia) PSM Makassar advanced to Group H.

Play-off round
(Timor-Leste) Lalenok United	1	1	2
(Indonesia) PSM Makassar	4	3	7

=== Play-off ASEAN 2 ===
- (Myanmar) Yangon United advanced to Group F.

Play-off round
(Brunei) Indera	1	1	2
(Myanmar) Yangon United	6	3	9

=== Play-off ASEAN 3 ===
- (Cambodia) Svay Rieng advanced to Group G.

Play-off round
(Cambodia) Svay Rieng	4	3	7
(Laos) Master 7	1	0	1

=== Play-off East Asia ===
- Winners would have advanced to Group I.

Play-off round
(Chinese Taipei) Taipower	—
(Mongolia) Ulaanbaatar City	—

== Preliminary round 1 ==
=== Summary ===
A total of two teams played in the preliminary round 1.

South Asia Zone
Team 1	Agg.	Team 2	1st leg	2nd leg
Defenders (Sri Lanka)	5–5 (a)	(Bhutan) Paro	3–3	2–2

=== South Asia Zone ===
22 January 2020
19:00 UTC+5:30

Defenders (Sri Lanka)	3–3	(Bhutan) Paro
Kumara 4', 63'; Asante 36'	Report	Fabassou 12', 45+3'; C. Gyeltshen 24'

Colombo Racecourse, Colombo (Note: Defenders played their home match at Colombo Racecourse, Colombo, instead of their regular home stadium Homagama Ground, Homagama.)
Attendance: 2,100
Referee: Bijan Heidari (Iran)
29 January 2020
14:30 UTC+6

Paro (Bhutan)	2–2	(Sri Lanka) Defenders
C. Gyeltshen 12'; Dorji 51'	Report	Ramaiyajesu 16'; Abumere 53'

Changlimithang Stadium, Thimphu (Note: Paro played their home matches at Changlimithang Stadium, Thimphu, instead of their regular home stadium Woochu Sports Arena, Paro.)
Attendance: 7,128
Referee: Timur Faizullin (Kyrgyzstan)

5–5 on aggregate. Paro won on away goals.

== Preliminary round 2 ==
=== Summary ===
A total of 8 teams played in the preliminary round 2: seven teams which entered in this round, and one winner of the preliminary round 1.

Central Asia Zone
Team 1	Agg.	Team 2	1st leg	2nd leg
Neftchi (Kyrgyzstan)	w/o	(Turkmenistan) Ahal	—	—

South Asia Zone
Team 1	Agg.	Team 2	1st leg	2nd leg
Paro (Bhutan)	1–10	(India) Bengaluru	0–1	1–9
Abahani Limited Dhaka (Bangladesh)	2–2 (a)	(Maldives) Maziya	2–2	0–0

Notes

1. ^{†} Neftchi won on walkover after Ahal were disqualified by the AFC for failing to appear for the first leg.

=== Central Asia Zone ===
5 February 2020
14:00 UTC+6

Neftchi (Kyrgyzstan)	Cancelled	(Turkmenistan) Ahal
	Report

Kurmanbek Stadium, Jalal-Abad
Referee: Zaid Thamer (Iraq)
12 February 2020
15:00 UTC+5

Ahal (Turkmenistan)	Cancelled	(Kyrgyzstan) Neftchi
	Report

Ashgabat Stadium, Ashgabat
Referee: Qasim Al-Hatmi (Oman)

Neftchi won on walkover after Ahal were disqualified by the AFC for failing to travel to Kyrgyzstan for the first leg due to concerns of the COVID-19 pandemic in Asia.

=== South Asia Zone ===
5 February 2020
14:30 UTC+6

Paro (Bhutan)	0–1	(India) Bengaluru
	Report	Haokip 53'

Changlimithang Stadium, Thimphu
Attendance: 8,140
Referee: Ahmad Al-Ali (Kuwait)
12 February 2020
19:30 UTC+5:30

Bengaluru (India)	9–1	(Bhutan) Paro
Haokip 6', 26', 66', 85'; Juanan 14'; Brown 29', 54', 64'; Nili 79'	Report	C. Gyeltshen 16'

Sree Kanteerava Stadium, Bengaluru
Attendance: 1,311
Referee: Khalid Al-Turais (Saudi Arabia)

Bengaluru won 10–1 on aggregate.

5 February 2020
17:00 UTC+6

Abahani Limited Dhaka (Bangladesh)	2–2	(Maldives) Maziya
Maílson 45+1'; Chizoba 80'	Report	Mahudhee 42'; Stewart 65'

Bangabandhu National Stadium, Dhaka
Attendance: 855
Referee: Clifford Daypuyat (Philippines)
12 February 2020
16:00 UTC+5

Maziya (Maldives)	0–0	(Bangladesh) Abahani Limited Dhaka
	Report

National Football Stadium, Malé
Attendance: 747
Referee: Ahmad A'Qashah (Singapore)

2–2 on aggregate. Maziya won on away goals.

== Play-off round ==
=== Summary ===
A total of 14 teams played in the play-off round: ten teams which entered in this round, and four winners of the preliminary round 2.

West Asia Zone
Team 1	Agg.	Team 2	1st leg	2nd leg
Hilal Al-Quds (Palestine)	2–0	(Oman) Sur	2–0	0–0

Central Asia Zone
Team 1	Agg.	Team 2	1st leg	2nd leg
Neftchi (Kyrgyzstan)	1–3	(Tajikistan) Khujand	1–0	0–3 (a.e.t.)

South Asia Zone
Team 1	Agg.	Team 2	1st leg	2nd leg
Maziya (Maldives)	4–4 (4–3 p)	(India) Bengaluru	2–1	2–3 (a.e.t.)

ASEAN Zone
Team 1	Agg.	Team 2	1st leg	2nd leg
Lalenok United (Timor-Leste)	2–7	(Indonesia) PSM Makassar	1–4	1–3
Indera (Brunei)	2–9	(Myanmar) Yangon United	1–6	1–3
Svay Rieng (Cambodia)	7–1	(Laos) Master 7	4–1	3–0

East Asia Zone
Team 1	Score	Team 2
Taipower (Chinese Taipei)	~~16 Oct~~	(Mongolia) Ulaanbaatar City

=== West Asia Zone ===
21 January 2020
14:00 UTC+2

Hilal Al-Quds (Palestine)	2–0	(Oman) Sur
Al-Iwisat 12'; Bassim 66'	Report

Faisal Al-Husseini International Stadium, Al-Ram
Attendance: 500
Referee: Jansen Foo (Singapore)
28 January 2020
18:30 UTC+4

Sur (Oman)	0–0	(Palestine) Hilal Al-Quds
	Report

Al-Seeb Stadium, Seeb
Attendance: 110
Referee: Shaun Evans (Australia)

Hilal Al-Quds won 2–0 on aggregate.

=== Central Asia Zone ===
19 February 2020
14:00 UTC+6

Neftchi (Kyrgyzstan)	1–0	(Tajikistan) Khujand
Ihnatenko 51'	Report

Kurmanbek Stadium, Jalal-Abad
Attendance: 1,100
Referee: Chae Sang-hyeop (South Korea)
26 February 2020
16:00 UTC+5

Khujand (Tajikistan)	3–0 (a.e.t.)	(Kyrgyzstan) Neftchi
Bozorov 34', 107', 117'	Report

Pamir Stadium, Dushanbe (Note: Khujand played their home match at Pamir Stadium, Dushanbe, instead of their regular home stadium 20 Years of Independence Stadium, Khujand.)
Attendance: 5,200
Referee: Ahmed Al-Ali (Jordan)

Khujand won 3–1 on aggregate.

=== South Asia Zone ===
19 February 2020
16:00 UTC+5

Maziya (Maldives)	2–1	(India) Bengaluru
Mahudhee 64'; Stewart 80'	Report	Nili 71' (pen.)

National Football Stadium, Malé
Attendance: 678
Referee: Adel Al-Naqbi (United Arab Emirates)
26 February 2020
19:30 UTC+5:30

Bengaluru (India)	3–2 (a.e.t.)	(Maldives) Maziya
Brown 58'; Chhetri 78', 120+1'	Report	Waheed 73'; Stewart 103'
Penalties
Paartalu (penalty scored); Lewis (penalty scored); Bheke (penalty missed); Chhetri (penalty scored); Brown (penalty missed); Shrivas (penalty missed)	3–4	(penalty scored) Hamza; (penalty missed) Mukhammad; (penalty missed) Planić; (penalty scored) Aisam; (penalty scored) Waheed; (penalty scored) Nihan

Sree Kanteerava Stadium, Bengaluru
Attendance: 1,321
Referee: Mongkolchai Pechsri (Thailand)

4–4 on aggregate. Maziya won 4–3 on penalties.

=== ASEAN Zone ===
22 January 2020
15:30 UTC+8

Lalenok United (Timor-Leste)	1–4	(Indonesia) PSM Makassar
Adade 3'	Report	Sinaga 13', 70', 73'; Giancarlo 42'

Kapten I Wayan Dipta Stadium, Gianyar Regency (Indonesia) (Note: Lalenok United played their home match in Indonesia.)
Attendance: 335
Referee: Chen Hsin-chuan (Chinese Taipei)
29 January 2020
15:30 UTC+7

PSM Makassar (Indonesia)	3–1	(Timor-Leste) Lalenok United
Giancarlo 6'; Sinaga 29'; Irsyad 85'	Report	Da Costa 60'

Pakansari Stadium, Cibinong (Note: PSM Makassar played their home match at Pakansari Stadium, Cibinong, instead of their regular home stadium Andi Mattalata Stadium, Makassar, since it did not meet AFC regulations.)
Attendance: 686
Referee: Hasan Akrami (Iran)

PSM Makassar won 7–2 on aggregate.

22 January 2020
20:15 UTC+8

Indera (Brunei)	1–6	(Myanmar) Yangon United
Carvalho 78'	Report	Than Paing 11', 16'; Barfo 44', 53'; Maung Maung Lwin 58'; Aung Kyaw Naing 72'

Hassanal Bolkiah National Stadium, Bandar Seri Begawan
Attendance: 2,000
Referee: Ali Shaban (Kuwait)
29 January 2020
15:30 UTC+6:30

Yangon United (Myanmar)	3–1	(Brunei) Indera
Kaung Htet Soe 13'; Uzochukwu 63'; Than Paing 77'	Report	Tosi 37' (pen.)

Thuwunna Stadium, Yangon
Attendance: 524
Referee: Ho Wai Sing (Hong Kong)

Yangon United won 9–2 on aggregate.

22 January 2020
18:00 UTC+7

Svay Rieng (Cambodia)	4–1	(Laos) Master 7
Hoy 15', 69'; Mbarga 40', 62'	Report	Coulibaly 25'

Phnom Penh Olympic Stadium, Phnom Penh (Note: Svay Rieng played their home match at Phnom Penh Olympic Stadium, Phnom Penh, instead of their regular home stadium Svay Rieng Stadium, Svay Rieng.)
Attendance: 1,998
Referee: Kim Woo-sung (South Korea)
29 January 2020
17:00 UTC+7

Master 7 (Laos)	0–3	(Cambodia) Svay Rieng
	Report	Pidor 22'; Mbarga 45'; Santos 71'

New Laos National Stadium, Vientiane
Attendance: 1,000
Referee: Ammar Mahfoodh (Bahrain)

Svay Rieng won 7–1 on aggregate.

=== East Asia Zone ===
16 October 2020
19:00 UTC+8

Taipower (Chinese Taipei)	Cancelled	(Mongolia) Ulaanbaatar City
	Report

National Stadium, Kaohsiung
