= 2020 AFC Cup =

Tournament details
- Dates: Qualifying: 21 January – 26 February 2020; Competition proper: 10 February – 11 March 2020 (Remaining matches cancelled)
- Teams: Competition proper: 36; Total: 48 (from 28 associations)

Final positions
- Champions: Not awarded

Tournament statistics
- Matches played: 32
- Goals scored: 91 (2.84 per match)
- Attendance: 52,237 (1,632 per match)
- Top scorer(s): (Spain) Bienvenido Marañón (5 goals)
- (Note: All statistics do not include qualifying play-offs)

The 2020 AFC Cup was an abandoned season of the AFC Cup which was the 17th edition of the competition, Asia's secondary club football tournament organized by the Asian Football Confederation (AFC).

The competition was suspended due to the COVID-19 pandemic after group stage matches on 11 March 2020, and was originally to resume on 23 September 2020. However, the season was eventually cancelled by the AFC on 10 September 2020 on account of the continuing pandemic.

Al-Ahed of Lebanon were the defending champions.

== Association team allocation ==
The 46 AFC member associations (excluding the associate member Northern Mariana Islands) were ranked based on their national team's and clubs' performance over the last four years in AFC competitions, with the allocation of slots for the 2019 and 2020 editions of the AFC club competitions determined by the 2017 AFC rankings (Entry Manual Article 2.3):

- The associations were split into five zones:
  - West Asia Zone consisted of the associations from the West Asian Football Federation (WAFF).
  - Central Asia Zone consisted of the associations from Central Asian Football Association (CAFA).
  - South Asia Zone consisted of the associations from the South Asian Football Federation (SAFF).
  - ASEAN Zone consisted of the associations from the ASEAN Football Federation (AFF).
  - East Asia Zone consisted of the associations from the East Asian Football Federation (EAFF).
- All associations which did not receive direct slots in the AFC Champions League group stage were eligible to enter the AFC Cup.
- In each zone, the number of groups in the group stage was determined based on the number of entries, with the number of slots filled through play-offs same as the number of groups:
  - In the West Asia Zone and the ASEAN Zone, there were three groups in the group stage, including a total of 9 direct slots, with the 3 remaining slots filled through play-offs.
  - In the Central Asia Zone, the South Asia Zone, and the East Asia Zone, there was one group in the group stage, including a total of 3 direct slots, with the 1 remaining slot filled through play-offs.
- The top associations participating in the AFC Cup in each zone as per the AFC rankings received at least one direct slot in the group stage (including losers of the AFC Champions League qualifying play-offs), while the remaining associations get only play-off slots:
  - For the West Asia Zone and the ASEAN zone:
    - The associations ranked 1st to 3rd each received two direct slots.
    - The associations ranked 4th to 6th each received one direct slot and one play-off slot.
    - The associations ranked 7th or below each received one play-off slot.
  - For the Central Asia Zone, the South Asia Zone, and the East Asia zone:
    - The associations ranked 1st to 3rd each received one direct slot and one play-off slot.
    - The associations ranked 4th or below each received one play-off slot.
- The maximum number of slots for each association was one-third of the total number of eligible teams in the top division.
- If any association did not use its direct slots, they would be redistributed to the highest eligible association, with each association limited to a maximum of two direct slots.
- If any association did not use its play-off slots, they are annulled and not redistributed to any other association.
- If the number of teams in the play-offs in any zone was fewer than twice the number of group stage slots filled through play-offs, the play-off teams of the highest eligible associations would be given byes to the group stage.

=== Association ranking ===
For the 2020 AFC Cup, the associations were allocated slots according to their association ranking as at 15 December 2017. This took into account their performance in the AFC Champions League and the AFC Cup, as well as their national team's FIFA World Rankings, during the period between 2014 and 2017.

Participation for 2020 AFC Cup
Participating
Not participating

West Asia Zone (3 groups)
Rank		Member Association	Points	Slots			
Rank		Member Association	Points	Group stage	Play-off		
Zone	AFC	Member Association	Points	Group stage	Play-off round	Prelim. round 2	Prelim. round 1
1	16	Syria	28.983	2	0	0	0
2	18	Jordan	25.649	2	0	0	0
3	19	Kuwait	24.798	2	0	0	0
4	20	Bahrain	24.337	2	0	0	0
5	22	Lebanon	21.367	2	0	0	0
6	27	Oman	13.921	1	1	0	0
7	29	Palestine	10.552	0	1	0	0
8	34	Yemen	3.358	0	0	0	0
Total		Participating associations: 7		11	2	0	0
Total		Participating associations: 7		11	2		
Total		Participating associations: 7		13			

Central Asia Zone (1 group)
Rank		Member Association	Points	Slots			
Rank		Member Association	Points	Group stage	Play-off		
Zone	AFC	Member Association	Points	Group stage	Play-off round	Prelim. round 2	Prelim. round 1
1	12	Tajikistan	30.725	1	1	0	0
2	26	Turkmenistan	14.163	1	0	1	0
3	31	Kyrgyzstan	5.680	1	0	1	0
4	37	Afghanistan	2.454	0	0	0	0
Total		Participating associations: 3		3	1	2	0
Total		Participating associations: 3		3	3		
Total		Participating associations: 3		6			

South Asia Zone (1 group)
Rank		Member Association	Points	Slots			
Rank		Member Association	Points	Group stage	Play-off		
Zone	AFC	Member Association	Points	Group stage	Play-off round	Prelim. round 2	Prelim. round 1
1	15	India	29.291	1	0	1	0
2	28	Maldives	11.970	1	0	1	0
3	33	Bangladesh	3.365	1	0	1	0
4	38	Nepal	1.228	0	0	0	0
5	39	Bhutan	0.875	0	0	0	1
6	44	Sri Lanka	0.325	0	0	0	1
7	46	Pakistan	0.188	0	0	0	0
Total		Participating associations: 5		3	0	3	2
Total		Participating associations: 5		3	5		
Total		Participating associations: 5		8			

ASEAN Zone (3 groups)
Rank		Member Association	Points	Slots			
Rank		Member Association	Points	Group stage	Play-off		
Zone	AFC	Member Association	Points	Group stage	Play-off round	Prelim. round 2	Prelim. round 1
1	17	Vietnam	27.426	2	0	0	0
2	21	Philippines	21.405	2	0	0	0
3	23	Singapore	17.084	2	0	0	0
4	24	Indonesia	16.871	1	1	0	0
5	25	Myanmar	14.753	1	1	0	0
6	32	Laos	3.439	1	1	0	0
7	35	Cambodia	3.312	0	1	0	0
8	41	Brunei	0.564	0	1	0	0
9	43	Timor-Leste	0.401	0	1	0	0
Total		Participating associations: 9		9	6	0	0
Total		Participating associations: 9		9	6		
Total		Participating associations: 9		15			

East Asia Zone (1 group)
Rank		Member Association	Points	Slots			
Rank		Member Association	Points	Group stage	Play-off		
Zone	AFC	Member Association	Points	Group stage	Play-off round	Prelim. round 2	Prelim. round 1
1	14	Hong Kong	29.300	1	1	0	0
2	30	North Korea	7.797	0	0	0	0
3	36	Chinese Taipei	2.769	1	0	1	0
4	40	Macau	0.815	1	0	0	0
5	42	Guam	0.539	0	0	0	0
6	45	Mongolia	0.213	0	0	1	0
Total		Participating associations: 4		3	1	2	0
Total		Participating associations: 4		3	3		
Total		Participating associations: 4		6			

Notes

1. Yemen (YEM): Yemen did not implement the AFC Cup club licensing system.
2. Afghanistan (AFG): Afghanistan did not implement the AFC Cup club licensing system.
3. Nepal (NEP): Nepal did not have any teams which had an AFC Cup license.
4. Pakistan (PAK): Pakistan did not implement the AFC Cup club licensing system.
5. North Korea (PRK): North Korea did not have any teams entering the competition.
6. Guam (GUM): Guam did not submit any list of licensed teams.

== Teams ==
The following 48 teams from 28 associations entered the competition. Teams from Brunei and Timor-Leste entered the AFC Cup for the first time.

West Asia ZoneGroup stage direct entrants (Groups A–C)
Team	Qualifying method	App (Last)
(Syria) Al-Jaish	2018–19 Syrian Premier League champions	10th (2019)
(Syria) Al-Wathba	2018–19 Syrian Cup winners	1st
(Jordan) Al-Faisaly	2018–19 Jordanian Pro League champions and 2018–19 Jordan FA Cup winners	10th (2018)
(Jordan) Al-Jazeera	2018–19 Jordanian Pro League runners-up	4th (2019)
Al-Kuwait	2018–19 Kuwaiti Premier League champions and 2018–19 Kuwait Emir Cup winners	9th (2019)
(Kuwait) Al-Qadsia	2018–19 Kuwaiti Premier League runners-up	8th (2019)
(Bahrain) Al-Riffa	2018–19 Bahraini Premier League champions and 2018–19 Bahraini King's Cup winners	5th (2015)
(Bahrain) Manama	2018–19 Bahraini Premier League runners-up	2nd (2018)
(Lebanon) Al-Ahed	2018–19 Lebanese Premier League champions 2018–19 Lebanese FA Cup winners	10th (2019)
(Lebanon) Al-Ansar	2018–19 Lebanese Premier League runners-up	6th (2018)
(Oman) Dhofar	2018–19 Oman Professional League champions	5th (2018)

Qualifying play-off participants: Entering in play-off round
Team	Qualifying method	App (Last)
(Oman) Sur	2018–19 Sultan Qaboos Cup winners	2nd (2008)
(Palestine) Hilal Al-Quds	2018–19 West Bank Premier League champions	4th (2019)

Central Asia ZoneGroup stage direct entrants (Group D)
Team	Qualifying method	App (Last)
(Tajikistan) Istiklol	2019 Tajikistan Higher League champions and 2019 Tajikistan Cup winners	6th (2019)
(Turkmenistan) Altyn Asyr	2019 Ýokary Liga champions 2019 Turkmenistan Cup winners	6th (2019)
(Kyrgyzstan) Dordoi	2019 Kyrgyz Premier League champions	5th (2019)

Qualifying play-off participants: Entering in play-off round
Team	Qualifying method	App (Last)
(Tajikistan) Khujand	2019 Tajikistan Higher League runners-up	4th (2019)

Qualifying play-off participants: Entering in preliminary round 2
Team	Qualifying method	App (Last)
(Kyrgyzstan) Neftchi	2019 Kyrgyzstan Cup winners	1st

Withdrawn teams
Team	Qualifying method	App. to be (Last)
(Turkmenistan) Ahal	2019 Ýokary Liga runners-up	4th (2019)

South Asia ZoneGroup stage direct entrants (Group E)
Team	Qualifying method	App (Last)
(India) Chennai City	2018–19 I-League champions	1st
(Maldives) TC Sports	2018 Dhivehi Premier League champions	2nd (2018)
(Bangladesh) Bashundhara Kings	2018–19 Bangladesh Premier League champions	1st

Qualifying play-off participants: Entering in preliminary round 2
Team	Qualifying method	App (Last)
(India) Bengaluru	2018–19 Indian Super League champions	5th (2018)
(Maldives) Maziya	2018 Dhivehi Premier League runners-up	6th (2017)
(Bangladesh) Abahani Limited Dhaka	2018–19 Bangladesh Premier League runners-up	4th (2019)

Qualifying play-off participants: Entering in preliminary round 1
Team	Qualifying method	App (Last)
(Bhutan) Paro	2019 Bhutan Premier League champions	1st
(Sri Lanka) Defenders	2018–19 Sri Lanka Champions League champions	1st

ASEAN ZoneGroup stage direct entrants (Groups F–H)
Team	Qualifying method	App (Last)
(Vietnam) Hồ Chí Minh City	2019 V.League 1 runners-up	1st
(Vietnam) Than Quảng Ninh	2019 V.League 1 3rd place	2nd (2017)
(Philippines) Ceres–Negros	2019 Philippines Football League champions and 2019 Copa Paulino Alcantara winners	6th (2019)
(Philippines) Kaya–Iloilo	2019 Philippines Football League runners-up	3rd (2019)
(Singapore) Tampines Rovers	2019 Singapore Premier League runners-up 2019 Singapore Cup winners	12th (2019)
(Singapore) Hougang United	2019 Singapore Premier League 3rd place	1st
(Indonesia) Bali United	2019 Liga 1 champions	2nd (2018)
(Myanmar) Shan United	2019 Myanmar National League champions	3rd (2019)
(Laos) Lao Toyota	2019 Lao Premier League champions 2019 Lao FF Cup winners	6th (2019)

Qualifying play-off participants: Entering in play-off round
Team	Qualifying method	App (Last)
(Indonesia) PSM Makassar	2018–19 Piala Indonesia winners	2nd (2019)
(Myanmar) Yangon United	2019 General Aung San Shield winners	7th (2019)
(Laos) Master 7	2019 Lao Premier League runners-up	1st
(Cambodia) Svay Rieng	2019 C-League champions	1st
(Brunei) Indera	2018–19 Brunei Super League 4th place	1st
(Timor-Leste) Lalenok United	2019 LFA Primeira champions	1st

East Asia ZoneGroup stage direct entrants (Group I)
Team	Qualifying method	App (Last)
(Hong Kong) Kitchee	2018–19 Hong Kong FA Cup winners	8th (2019)
(Chinese Taipei) Tatung	2019 Taiwan Premier League champions	2nd (2017)
(Macau) MUST CPK	2019 Liga de Elite champions	1st

Qualifying play-off participants: Entering in play-off round
Team	Qualifying method	App (Last)
(Chinese Taipei) Taipower	2019 Taiwan Premier League runners-up	1st
(Mongolia) Ulaanbaatar City	2019 Mongolian Premier League champions	1st

Withdrawn teams
Team	Qualifying method	App (Last)
(Hong Kong) Tai Po	2018–19 Hong Kong Premier League champions	3rd (2019)

Notes

1. Title holders (TH): Al-Ahed are the title holders.
2. AFC Champions League (ACL): Teams played in the AFC Champions League qualifying play-offs, but failed to advance to the AFC Champions League group stage. Had they advanced to the AFC Champions League group stage, they would not play in the AFC Cup, and would be replaced by the standby team from the same association if such team were available.
3. Brunei (BRU): MS ABDB, the 2018–19 Brunei Super League champions, failed to obtain an AFC license. As a result, Indera, the league 4th place (only team with an AFC license), enter the qualifying play-offs.
4. Central Asia Zone (CAZ): Ahal were disqualified by the AFC for failing to appear for the first leg of preliminary round 2 matches.
5. East Asia Zone (EAZ): Tai Po (Hong Kong) withdrew from the group stage after the draw (originally drawn in Group I). As a result, Kitchee (Hong Kong) entered the group stage instead of the play-off round to replace Tai Po, and Taipower (Chinese Taipei) and Ulaanbaatar City (Mongolia) entered the play-off round instead of the preliminary round 2, which was cancelled.
6. Philippines (PHI): Ceres–Negros underwent a management change mid-competition in July 2020 while the AFC Cup was still suspended due to the pandemic, with MMC Sportz Asia taking over. The club renamed as United City. It is uncertain if the club would have been allowed by the AFC to continue their campaign in the AFC Cup under the new name and management had the tournament not been cancelled.
7. Singapore (SIN): DPMM, the 2019 Singapore Premier League champions, is a team from Brunei and thus ineligible to represent Singapore in AFC club competitions. As a result, Hougang United, the league 3rd place, enter the group stage.
8. Vietnam (VIE): Hà Nội, the 2019 V.League 1 champions and 2019 Vietnamese Cup winners, failed to obtain an AFC license (as their U15 team did not participate in Vietnam National U15 Youth League). As a result, Than Quảng Ninh, the league 3rd place, enter the group stage.
Location of teams of the 2020 AFC Cup group stage.
Brown: Group A; Red: Group B; Orange: Group C; Yellow: Group D; Green: Group E;
Blue: Group F; Cyan: Group G; Purple: Group H; Pink: Group I; Qualifying play-offs
~~Withdrawn teams~~

== Schedule ==
The schedule of the competition is as follows. Due to the COVID-19 pandemic, only some of the group stage matches on matchdays 1–3 in February and March were played as scheduled, and all matches in the East Asia Zone, on matchdays 2–6 in the Central Asia Zone and the South Asia Zone, and on matchdays 4–6 in the West Asia Zone and the ASEAN Zone, were postponed until further notice. The West Asia Zonal semi-finals were also initially moved to 24–25 August and 14–15 September.

The AFC announced the calendar of the remaining matches on 9 July 2020, with all group stage matches played at centralised venues, and all knockout ties played as a single match. The AFC announced the cancellation of the remainder of the competition on 10 September 2020, due to logistics in coordinating the five zones.

Notes:

- W: West Asia Zone
- C: Central Asia Zone
- S: South Asia Zone
- A: ASEAN Zone
- E: East Asia Zone
- ~~Italics~~: planned new dates after restart, before the cancellation of the tournament

Stage	Round	Draw date	Match dates	
Stage	Round	Draw date	First leg	Second leg
Preliminary stage	Preliminary round 1	No draw	22 January 2020 (S)	29 January 2020 (S)
Preliminary stage	Preliminary round 2	No draw	5 February 2020 (C, S)	12 February 2020 (C, S)
Play-off stage	Play-off round	No draw	21–22 January 2020 (W, A), 19 February 2020 (C, S)	28–29 January 2020 (W, A), 26 February 2020 (C, S)
Play-off stage	Play-off round	No draw	~~16 October 2020~~ (E)	
Group stage	Matchday 1	10 December 2019	10–12 February 2020 (W, A), 11 March 2020 (C, S), ~~20 October 2020~~ (C, E)	
Group stage	Matchday 2	10 December 2019	24–26 February 2020 (W, A), ~~23 October 2020~~ (W, C, S, E)	
Group stage	Matchday 3	10 December 2019	9–11 March 2020 (A), ~~26 October 2020~~ (W, C, S, E)	
Group stage	Matchday 4	10 December 2019	~~23 September 2020~~ (A), ~~29 October 2020~~ (W, C, S, E)	
Group stage	Matchday 5	10 December 2019	~~26 September 2020~~ (A), ~~1 November 2020~~ (W, C, S, E)	
Group stage	Matchday 6	10 December 2019	~~29 September 2020~~ (A), ~~4 November 2020~~ (W, C, S, E)	
Knockout stage	Zonal semi-finals	10 December 2019	~~20–21 October 2020~~ (A), ~~23–24 November 2020~~ (W)	
Knockout stage	Zonal finals	Cancelled	~~4 November 2020~~ (A), ~~1 December 2020~~ (W)	
Knockout stage	Inter-zone play-off semi-finals	Cancelled	~~24–25 November 2020~~	
Knockout stage	Inter-zone play-off final	Cancelled	~~2 December 2020~~	
Knockout stage	Final	Cancelled	~~12 December 2020~~	

The original schedule of the competition, as planned before the pandemic, was as follows.

Original schedule for 2020 AFC Cup
Stage	Round	Draw date	First leg	Second leg
Preliminary stage	Preliminary round 1	No draw	22 January 2020 (S)	29 January 2020 (S)
Preliminary stage	Preliminary round 2	No draw	4–5 February 2020 (C, S, E)	11–12 February 2020 (C, S, E)
Play-off stage	Play-off round	No draw	21–22 January 2020 (W, A), 18–19 February 2020 (C, S, E)	28–29 January 2020 (W, A), 25–26 February 2020 (C, S, E)
Group stage	Matchday 1	10 December 2019	10–12 February 2020 (W, A), 10–11 March 2020 (C, S, E)	
Group stage	Matchday 2	10 December 2019	24–26 February 2020 (W, A), 14–15 April 2020 (C, S, E)	
Group stage	Matchday 3	10 December 2019	9–11 March 2020 (W, A), 28–29 April 2020 (C, S, E)	
Group stage	Matchday 4	10 December 2019	13–15 April 2020 (W, A), 12–13 May 2020 (C, S, E)	
Group stage	Matchday 5	10 December 2019	27–29 April 2020 (W, A), 26–27 May 2020 (C, S, E)	
Group stage	Matchday 6	10 December 2019	11–13 May 2020 (W, A), 16–17 June 2020 (C, S, E)	
Knockout stage	Zonal semi-finals	10 December 2019	25–27 May 2020 (W, A)	15–17 June 2020 (W, A)
Knockout stage	Zonal finals	TBD	4–5 August 2020 (A), 29 September 2020 (W)	11–12 August 2020 (A), 20 October 2020 (W)
Knockout stage	Inter-zone play-off semi-finals	TBD	25–26 August 2020	15–16 September 2020
Knockout stage	Inter-zone play-off final	TBD	30 September 2020	21 October 2020
Knockout stage	Final	TBD	7 November 2020	

== Qualifying play-offs ==
In the qualifying play-offs, each tie was played on a home-and-away two-legged basis. The away goals rule, extra time (away goals would not apply in extra time) and penalty shoot-out would be used to decide the winner if necessary (Regulations Article 9.3). The bracket of the qualifying play-offs for each zone was determined based on the association ranking of each team, with the team from the higher-ranked association hosting the second leg. The seven winners of the play-off round (one each from West Asia Zone, Central Asia Zone, South Asia Zone, East Asia Zone, and three from ASEAN Zone) would advance to the group stage to join the 29 direct entrants.

=== Preliminary round 1 ===
South Asia Zone
Team 1	Agg.	Team 2	1st leg	2nd leg
Defenders (Sri Lanka)	5–5 (a)	(Bhutan) Paro	3–3	2–2

=== Preliminary round 2 ===
Central Asia Zone
Team 1	Agg.	Team 2	1st leg	2nd leg
Neftchi (Kyrgyzstan)	w/o	(Turkmenistan) Ahal	—	—

South Asia Zone
Team 1	Agg.	Team 2	1st leg	2nd leg
Paro (Bhutan)	1–10	(India) Bengaluru	0–1	1–9
Abahani Limited Dhaka (Bangladesh)	2–2 (a)	(Maldives) Maziya	2–2	0–0

Notes

1. ^{†} Neftchi won on walkover after Ahal were disqualified by the AFC for failing to appear for the first leg.

=== Play-off round ===
West Asia Zone
Team 1	Agg.	Team 2	1st leg	2nd leg
Hilal Al-Quds (Palestine)	2–0	(Oman) Sur	2–0	0–0

Central Asia Zone
Team 1	Agg.	Team 2	1st leg	2nd leg
Neftchi (Kyrgyzstan)	1–3	(Tajikistan) Khujand	1–0	0–3 (a.e.t.)

South Asia Zone
Team 1	Agg.	Team 2	1st leg	2nd leg
Maziya (Maldives)	4–4 (4–3 p)	(India) Bengaluru	2–1	2–3 (a.e.t.)

ASEAN Zone
Team 1	Agg.	Team 2	1st leg	2nd leg
Lalenok United (Timor-Leste)	2–7	(Indonesia) PSM Makassar	1–4	1–3
Indera (Brunei)	2–9	(Myanmar) Yangon United	1–6	1–3
Svay Rieng (Cambodia)	7–1	(Laos) Master 7	4–1	3–0

East Asia Zone
Team 1	Score	Team 2
Taipower (Chinese Taipei)	~~16 Oct~~	(Mongolia) Ulaanbaatar City

== Group stage ==
The draw for the group stage was held on 10 December 2019, 14:00 MYT (UTC+8), at the AFC House in Kuala Lumpur, Malaysia. The 36 teams were drawn into nine groups of four: three groups each in the West Asia Zone (Groups A–C) and the ASEAN Zone (Groups F–H), and one group each in the Central Asia Zone (Group D), the South Asia Zone (Group E), and the East Asia Zone (Group I). Teams from the same association in the West Asia Zone and ASEAN Zone could not be drawn into the same group. In the group stage, each group was played on a double round-robin basis, with matches played home-and-away before the suspension due to the COVID-19 pandemic, but to be moved to centralised venues after restart which was eventually cancelled. The following teams would have advanced to the knockout stage:

- The winners of each group and the best runners-up in the West Asia Zone and the ASEAN Zone would have advanced to the Zonal semi-finals.
- The winners of each group in the Central Asia Zone, the South Asia Zone, and the East Asia Zone would have advanced to the Inter-zone play-off semi-finals.

Tiebreakers

The teams were ranked according to points (3 points for a win, 1 point for a draw, 0 points for a loss). If tied on points, tiebreakers were applied in the following order (Regulations Article 10.5):

1. Points in head-to-head matches among tied teams;
2. Goal difference in head-to-head matches among tied teams;
3. Goals scored in head-to-head matches among tied teams;
4. ~~Away goals scored in head-to-head matches among tied teams;~~ (this tiebreaker was removed since the matches were played in centralised venues after restart)
5. If more than two teams were tied, and after applying all head-to-head criteria above, a subset of teams were still tied, all head-to-head criteria above were reapplied exclusively to this subset of teams;
6. Goal difference in all group matches;
7. Goals scored in all group matches;
8. Penalty shoot-out if only two teams playing each other in the last round of the group were tied;
9. Disciplinary points (yellow card = 1 point, red card as a result of two yellow cards = 3 points, direct red card = 3 points, yellow card followed by direct red card = 4 points);
10. Association ranking;
11. Drawing of lots.

=== Group A ===
Pos	Team	Pld	W	D	L	GF	GA	GD	Pts	JAI	MAN	AHE	HQU
1	(Syria) Al-Jaish	2	1	1	0	1	0	+1	4 (Note: 2019 AFC association ranking: Syria (Al-Jaish) 22nd, Bahrain (Manama) 27th.)	—	0–0	~~29 Oct~~	~~4 Nov~~
2	(Bahrain) Manama	2	1	1	0	1	0	+1	4	~~1 Nov~~	—	1–0	~~29 Oct~~
3	(Lebanon) Al-Ahed	2	1	0	1	2	2	0	3	~~26 Oct~~	~~4 Nov~~	—	2–1
4	(Palestine) Hilal Al-Quds	2	0	0	2	1	3	−2	0	0–1	~~26 Oct~~	~~1 Nov~~	—

Source: AFC

=== Group B ===
Pos	Team	Pld	W	D	L	GF	GA	GD	Pts	KWT	ANS	WAT	FAI
1	Al-Kuwait	2	1	1	0	1	0	+1	4	—	1–0	~~4 Nov~~	~~29 Oct~~
2	(Lebanon) Al-Ansar	2	1	0	1	4	4	0	3	~~1 Nov~~	—	~~29 Oct~~	4–3
3	(Syria) Al-Wathba	2	0	2	0	0	0	0	2	0–0	~~26 Oct~~	—	~~1 Nov~~
4	(Jordan) Al-Faisaly	2	0	1	1	3	4	−1	1	~~26 Oct~~	~~4 Nov~~	0–0	—

Source: AFC

=== Group C ===
Pos	Team	Pld	W	D	L	GF	GA	GD	Pts	QAD	DHO	RIF	JAZ
1	(Kuwait) Al-Qadsia	1	1	0	0	2	1	+1	3 (Note: Head-to-head points (GD): Al-Qadsia 3 (+1), Dhofar 0 (0), Al-Riffa 0 (–1).)	—	~~23 Oct~~	~~1 Nov~~	~~26 Oct~~
2	(Oman) Dhofar	1	1	0	0	1	0	+1	3	~~4 Nov~~	—	~~29 Oct~~	1–0
3	(Bahrain) Al-Riffa	2	1	0	1	3	2	+1	3	1–2	~~26 Oct~~	—	~~4 Nov~~
4	(Jordan) Al-Jazeera	2	0	0	2	0	3	−3	0	~~29 Oct~~	~~1 Nov~~	0–2	—

Source: AFC

=== Group D ===
Pos	Team	Pld	W	D	L	GF	GA	GD	Pts	IST	ALT	DOR	KHU
1	(Tajikistan) Istiklol	1	1	0	0	2	0	+2	3	—	~~4 Nov~~	~~26 Oct~~	2–0
2	(Turkmenistan) Altyn Asyr	0	0	0	0	0	0	0	0	~~23 Oct~~	—	~~1 Nov~~	~~29 Oct~~
3	(Kyrgyzstan) Dordoi	0	0	0	0	0	0	0	0	~~29 Oct~~	~~20 Oct~~	—	~~4 Nov~~
4	(Tajikistan) Khujand	1	0	0	1	0	2	−2	0	~~1 Nov~~	~~26 Oct~~	~~23 Oct~~	—

Source: AFC

=== Group E ===
Pos	Team	Pld	W	D	L	GF	GA	GD	Pts	BAS	MAZ	CHE	TCS
1	(Bangladesh) Bashundhara Kings	1	1	0	0	5	1	+4	3	—	~~4 Nov~~	~~29 Oct~~	5–1
2	(Maldives) Maziya	1	0	1	0	2	2	0	1 (Note: Head-to-head away goals: Maziya 2, Chennai City 0.)	~~23 Oct~~	—	~~1 Nov~~	~~26 Oct~~
3	(India) Chennai City	1	0	1	0	2	2	0	1	~~26 Oct~~	2–2	—	~~4 Nov~~
4	(Maldives) TC Sports	1	0	0	1	1	5	−4	0	~~1 Nov~~	~~29 Oct~~	~~23 Oct~~	—

Source: AFC

=== Group F ===
Pos	Team	Pld	W	D	L	GF	GA	GD	Pts	HCM	YAN	HOU	LTO
1	(Vietnam) Hồ Chí Minh City	3	2	1	0	7	4	+3	7 (Note: Head-to-head away goals: Hồ Chí Minh City 2, Yangon United 0.)	—	~~26 Sep~~	~~29 Sep~~	~~23 Sep~~
2	(Myanmar) Yangon United	3	2	1	0	6	4	+2	7	2–2	—	1–0	3–2
3	(Singapore) Hougang United	3	1	0	2	5	5	0	3	2–3	~~23 Sep~~	—	~~26 Sep~~
4	(Laos) Lao Toyota	3	0	0	3	3	8	−5	0	0–2	~~29 Sep~~	1–3	—

Source: AFC

=== Group G ===
Pos	Team	Pld	W	D	L	GF	GA	GD	Pts	CER	TQN	SVR	BAL
1	(Philippines) Ceres–Negros	3	2	1	0	10	2	+8	7	—	2–2	4–0	4–0
2	(Vietnam) Than Quảng Ninh	3	1	1	1	7	7	0	4	~~29 Sep~~	—	~~23 Sep~~	~~26 Sep~~
3	(Cambodia) Svay Rieng	3	1	0	2	3	9	−6	3 (Note: Head-to-head points: Svay Rieng 3, Bali United 0.)	~~26 Sep~~	1–4	—	2–1
4	(Indonesia) Bali United	3	1	0	2	5	7	−2	3	~~23 Sep~~	4–1	~~29 Sep~~	—

Source: AFC

=== Group H ===
Pos	Team	Pld	W	D	L	GF	GA	GD	Pts	TAM	KAY	PSM	SHA
1	(Singapore) Tampines Rovers	3	2	1	0	4	2	+2	7	—	~~29 Sep~~	2–1	2–1
2	(Philippines) Kaya–Iloilo	3	1	2	0	3	1	+2	5	0–0	—	~~23 Sep~~	~~26 Sep~~
3	(Indonesia) PSM Makassar	3	1	1	1	5	4	+1	4	~~26 Sep~~	1–1	—	3–1
4	(Myanmar) Shan United	3	0	0	3	2	7	−5	0	~~23 Sep~~	0–2	~~29 Sep~~	—

Source: AFC

=== Group I ===
Pos	Team	Pld	W	D	L	GF	GA	GD	Pts	KIT	TAT	CPK	I4
1	(Hong Kong) Kitchee	0	0	0	0	0	0	0	0	—	~~4 Nov~~	~~26 Oct~~	~~20 Oct~~
2	(Chinese Taipei) Tatung	0	0	0	0	0	0	0	0	~~23 Oct~~	—	~~1 Nov~~	~~29 Oct~~
3	(Macau) MUST CPK	0	0	0	0	0	0	0	0	~~29 Oct~~	~~20 Oct~~	—	~~4 Nov~~
4	Winners of Play-off East Asia	0	0	0	0	0	0	0	0	~~1 Nov~~	~~26 Oct~~	~~23 Oct~~	—

Source: AFC

== Top scorers ==
Match cancelled.

Rank	Player	Team	MD1	MD2	MD3	Total
1	(Spain) Bienvenido Marañón	(Philippines) Ceres–Negros	2	1	2	5
2	(Argentina) Hernán Barcos	(Bangladesh) Bashundhara Kings	4			4
2	(Croatia) Stipe Plazibat	(Singapore) Hougang United	2	2		4
4	(Guinea-Bissau) Amido Baldé	(Vietnam) Hồ Chí Minh City	1	2		3
4	(Jamaica) Jeremie Lynch	(Vietnam) Than Quảng Ninh	1	1	1	3
6	(Myanmar) Aung Kyaw Naing	(Myanmar) Yangon United		2		2
6	(Tajikistan) Manuchekhr Dzhalilov	(Tajikistan) Istiklol	2			2
6	(Spain) Fito	(India) Chennai City	2			2
6	(Philippines) Eric Giganto	(Philippines) Kaya–Iloilo	1		1	2
6	(Jordan) Ahmed Hamdouni	(Jordan) Al-Faisaly		2		2
6	(Montenegro) Boris Kopitović	(Singapore) Tampines Rovers	1		1	2
6	(Cameroon) Jean Befolo Mbarga	(Cambodia) Svay Rieng		1	1	2
6	(Vietnam) Nguyễn Công Phượng	(Vietnam) Hồ Chí Minh City	1	1		2
6	(Vietnam) Nguyễn Hải Huy	(Vietnam) Than Quảng Ninh		1	1	2
6	(Vietnam) Nguyễn Xuân Nam	(Vietnam) Hồ Chí Minh City		2		2
6	(Netherlands) Melvin Platje	(Indonesia) Bali United	2			2
6	(Philippines) OJ Porteria	(Philippines) Ceres–Negros		1	1	2
6	(Indonesia) Ferdinand Sinaga	(Indonesia) PSM Makassar	1	1		2
6	(Indonesia) Ilija Spasojević	(Indonesia) Bali United	1	1		2
6	(Senegal) El Hadji Malick Tall	(Lebanon) Al-Ansar		2		2
6	(Canada) Jordan Webb	(Singapore) Tampines Rovers	1		1	2

Note: Goals scored in the qualifying play-offs are not counted when determining top scorer (Regulations Article 64.4).

== See also ==
- 2020 AFC Champions League
