= 2020 AFC Cup group stage =

The 2020 AFC Cup group stage was played from 10 February to 11 March 2020, before the remaining matches were initially suspended, and eventually cancelled by the AFC on 10 September 2020 due to the COVID-19 pandemic. Under the original competition format, a total of 36 teams would compete in the group stage to decide the 11 places in the knockout stage of the 2020 AFC Cup.

== Draw ==
The draw for the group stage was held on 10 December 2019, 14:00 MYT (UTC+8), at the AFC House in Kuala Lumpur, Malaysia. The 36 teams were drawn into nine groups of four: three groups each in the West Asia Zone (Groups A–C) and the ASEAN Zone (Groups F–H), and one group each in the Central Asia Zone (Group D), the South Asia Zone (Group E), and the East Asia Zone (Group I). Teams from the same association in the West Asia Zone and ASEAN Zone could not be drawn into the same group.

The mechanism of the draw was as follows:

- For the West Asia Zone, a draw was held for the five associations with two direct entrants (Syria, Jordan, Kuwait, Bahrain, Lebanon) to determine the order of associations occupying the following group positions (higher-seeded team of each association allocated to first position, lower-seeded team of each association allocated to second position): A1 and B2, B1 and C2, C1 and A2, A3 and B4, B3 and C4. The direct entrant from Oman and the play-off winners were allocated to positions C3 and A4 respectively.
- For the ASEAN Zone, a draw was held for the three associations with two direct entrants (Vietnam, Philippines, Singapore) to determine the order of associations occupying the following group positions (higher-seeded team of each association allocated to first position, lower-seeded team of each association allocated to second position): F1 and G2, G1 and H2, H1 and F2; another draw was held for the three associations with one direct entrant (Indonesia, Myanmar, Laos) to determine the order of associations occupying the following group positions (direct entrant of each association allocated to first position, play-off winners which the play-off team of each association may advance from allocated to second position): F3 and G4, G3 and H4, H3 and F4.
- For the Central Asia Zone, the South Asia Zone, and the East Asia Zone, no draw was held. The direct entrants were allocated to group positions 1, 2 and 3 according to their association ranking (Central Asia Zone: Tajikistan, Turkmenistan, Kyrgyzstan; South Asia Zone: India, Maldives, Bangladesh; East Asia Zone: Hong Kong, Chinese Taipei, Macau), and the play-off winners were allocated to group positions 4.

The following 36 teams entered into the group stage draw, which included the 29 direct entrants and the seven winners of the play-off round of the qualifying play-offs, whose identity was not known at the time of the draw.

Zone	Groups	Teams			
West Asia Zone	A–C	(Syria) Al-Jaish	(Syria) Al-Wathba	(Bahrain) Al-Riffa	(Bahrain) Manama
West Asia Zone	A–C	(Jordan) Al-Faisaly	(Jordan) Al-Jazeera	(Lebanon) Al-Ahed	(Lebanon) Al-Ansar
West Asia Zone	A–C	Al-Kuwait	(Kuwait) Al-Qadsia	(Oman) Dhofar	(Palestine) Hilal Al-Quds (Winners of Play-off West Asia)
Central Asia Zone	D	(Tajikistan) Istiklol	(Turkmenistan) Altyn Asyr	(Kyrgyzstan) Dordoi	(Tajikistan) Khujand (Winners of Play-off Central Asia)
South Asia Zone	E	(India) Chennai City	(Maldives) TC Sports	(Bangladesh) Bashundhara Kings	(Maldives) Maziya (Winners of Play-off South Asia)
ASEAN Zone	F–H	(Vietnam) Hồ Chí Minh City	(Vietnam) Than Quảng Ninh	(Indonesia) Bali United	(Indonesia) PSM Makassar (Winners of Play-off ASEAN 1)
ASEAN Zone	F–H	(Philippines) Ceres–Negros	(Philippines) Kaya–Iloilo	(Myanmar) Shan United	(Myanmar) Yangon United (Winners of Play-off ASEAN 2)
ASEAN Zone	F–H	(Singapore) Tampines Rovers	(Singapore) Hougang United	(Laos) Lao Toyota	(Cambodia) Svay Rieng (Winners of Play-off ASEAN 3)
East Asia Zone	I	(Hong Kong) Tai Po (Note: Tai Po (Hong Kong) withdrew from the group stage after the draw (originally drawn in Group I). As a result, Kitchee (Hong Kong) entered the group stage instead of the play-off round to replace Tai Po.)	(Chinese Taipei) Tatung	(Macau) MUST CPK	TBD (Winners of Play-off East Asia)

Standby teams (Note: The standby teams would replace a team from the same association which played in the AFC Champions League qualifying play-offs and advanced to the AFC Champions League group stage. There were no standby teams from Vietnam (for Hồ Chí Minh City), Philippines (for Ceres–Negros), and Hong Kong (for Tai Po).)

- (Jordan) ~~Al-Wehdat (for Al-Faisaly)~~
- ~~Al-Salmiya (for Al-Kuwait)~~
- (Bahrain) ~~Al-Muharraq (for Al-Riffa)~~
- (Tajikistan) ~~Regar-TadAZ (for Istiklol)~~
- (India) ~~FC Goa (for Chennai City)~~
- (Singapore) ~~Geylang International (for Tampines Rovers)~~
- (Indonesia) ~~Persebaya Surabaya (for Bali United)~~ (Note: The identity of the standby team from Indonesia was not known at the time of the group stage draw.)
- (Myanmar) ~~Ayeyawady United (for Shan United)~~

== Format ==
In the group stage, each group was played on a double round-robin basis, with matches played home-and-away before the suspension due to the COVID-19 pandemic, but to be moved to centralised venues after restart which was eventually cancelled. The following teams would have advanced to the knockout stage:

- The winners of each group and the best runners-up in the West Asia Zone and the ASEAN Zone would have advanced to the Zonal semi-finals.
- The winners of each group in the Central Asia Zone, the South Asia Zone, and the East Asia Zone would have advanced to the Inter-zone play-off semi-finals.

=== Tiebreakers ===
The teams were ranked according to points (3 points for a win, 1 point for a draw, 0 points for a loss). If tied on points, tiebreakers were applied in the following order (Regulations Article 10.5):

1. Points in head-to-head matches among tied teams;
2. Goal difference in head-to-head matches among tied teams;
3. Goals scored in head-to-head matches among tied teams;
4. ~~Away goals scored in head-to-head matches among tied teams;~~ (this tiebreaker was removed since the matches were played in centralised venues after restart)
5. If more than two teams were tied, and after applying all head-to-head criteria above, a subset of teams were still tied, all head-to-head criteria above were reapplied exclusively to this subset of teams;
6. Goal difference in all group matches;
7. Goals scored in all group matches;
8. Penalty shoot-out if only two teams playing each other in the last round of the group were tied;
9. Disciplinary points (yellow card = 1 point, red card as a result of two yellow cards = 3 points, direct red card = 3 points, yellow card followed by direct red card = 4 points);
10. Association ranking;
11. Drawing of lots.

== Schedule ==
The original schedule of each matchday was as follows.

- Matches in the West Asia Zone were played on Mondays and Tuesdays. One or two groups were played on each day, with the following groups played on Mondays:
  - Matchdays 1 and 2: Groups A and B
  - Matchday 3: Groups A and C
  - Matchday 4: Group B
  - Matchdays 5 and 6: Group C
- Matches in the ASEAN Zone were played on Tuesdays and Wednesdays. One or two groups were played on each day, with the following groups played on Tuesdays:
  - Matchdays 1 and 2: Groups F and G
  - Matchday 3: Groups F and H
  - Matchday 4: Group G
  - Matchdays 5 and 6: Group H
- Matches in the Central Asia Zone, the South Asia Zone, and the East Asia Zone were played on Wednesdays. If two teams from the same association were scheduled to play at home on the same matchday, the home match of the lower-seeded team was moved to Tuesday.

Matchday	Original dates		Original scheduled matches
Matchday	West Asia, ASEAN	Central Asia, South Asia, East Asia	Original scheduled matches
Matchday 1	10–12 February 2020 (all 12 matches played)	11 March 2020 (3 matches played, 3 cancelled)	Team 1 vs. Team 4, Team 3 vs. Team 2
Matchday 2	24–26 February 2020 (11 matches played, 1 cancelled)	15 April 2020 (all 6 matches cancelled)	Team 4 vs. Team 3, Team 2 vs. Team 1
Matchday 3	9–11 March 2020 (6 matches played, 6 cancelled)	29 April 2020 (all 6 matches cancelled)	Team 4 vs. Team 2, Team 1 vs. Team 3
Matchday 4	13–15 April 2020 (all 12 matches cancelled)	13 May 2020 (all 6 matches cancelled)	Team 2 vs. Team 4, Team 3 vs. Team 1
Matchday 5	27–29 April 2020 (all 12 matches cancelled)	27 May 2020 (all 6 matches cancelled)	Team 4 vs. Team 1, Team 2 vs. Team 3
Matchday 6	11–13 May 2020 (all 12 matches cancelled)	17 June 2020 (all 6 matches cancelled)	Team 1 vs. Team 2, Team 3 vs. Team 4

=== Effects of the COVID-19 pandemic ===
Due to the COVID-19 pandemic in Asia, the AFC announced on 11 February 2020 that the East Asia Zone group stage matches would be postponed to 6 May, 13 May, 20 May, 27 May, 17 June and 24 June.

The following matches were postponed to a later date between late February and early March, prior to AFC's announcement to postpone all matches:

- Group A: Hilal Al-Quds v Manama and Al-Ahed v Al-Jaish (9 March)
- Group B: Al-Wathba v Al-Ansar and Al-Faisaly v Al-Kuwait (10 March)
- Group C: Al-Qadsia v Dhofar (25 February), Al-Qadsia v Al-Jazeera and Al-Riffa v Dhofar (9 March)
- Group D: Dordoi v Altyn Asyr (11 March)

The AFC announced on 12 March 2020 that all remaining West Asia Zone group stage matches would be postponed to new dates yet to be confirmed due to the COVID-19 pandemic in Asia.

The AFC announced on 18 March 2020 that all matches would be postponed until further notice due to the COVID-19 pandemic. Only 32 group stage matches out of the 108 scheduled had been played by then.

On 9 July 2020, the AFC announced the new schedule for the remaining matches, with all group stage matches played at centralised venues.

Matchday	West Asia	Central Asia	South Asia	ASEAN	East Asia
Matchday 1	—	20 October 2020 (1 match)	—	—	20 October 2020
Matchday 2	23 October 2020 (1 match)	23 October 2020	23 October 2020	—	23 October 2020
Matchday 3	26 October 2020	26 October 2020	26 October 2020	—	26 October 2020
Matchday 4	29 October 2020	29 October 2020	29 October 2020	23 September 2020	29 October 2020
Matchday 5	1 November 2020	1 November 2020	1 November 2020	26 September 2020	1 November 2020
Matchday 6	4 November 2020	4 November 2020	4 November 2020	29 September 2020	4 November 2020

The AFC announced the cancellation of the remainder of the competition on 10 September 2020, due to logistics in coordinating the five zones.

=== Centralized venues after restart ===
On 30 July 2020, AFC announced that the ASEAN Zone matches of Groups F and G would be played at the Thống Nhất Stadium, Ho Chi Minh City and Cẩm Phả Stadium, Cẩm Phả, both in Vietnam. Moreover, AFC had earlier confirmed Maldives as the host for the South Asia Zone matches of Group E, which would be played at the National Football Stadium, Malé. On 5 August 2020, AFC announced that Bahrain, Kuwait and Jordan had been confirmed as the hosts for the West Asia Zone matches of Groups A, B and C respectively.

== Groups ==
=== Group A ===
Pos	Team	Pld	W	D	L	GF	GA	GD	Pts	JAI	MAN	AHE	HQU
1	(Syria) Al-Jaish	2	1	1	0	1	0	+1	4 (Note: 2019 AFC association ranking: Syria (Al-Jaish) 22nd, Bahrain (Manama) 27th.)	—	0–0	~~29 Oct~~	~~4 Nov~~
2	(Bahrain) Manama	2	1	1	0	1	0	+1	4	~~1 Nov~~	—	1–0	~~29 Oct~~
3	(Lebanon) Al-Ahed	2	1	0	1	2	2	0	3	~~26 Oct~~	~~4 Nov~~	—	2–1
4	(Palestine) Hilal Al-Quds	2	0	0	2	1	3	−2	0	0–1	~~26 Oct~~	~~1 Nov~~	—

Source: AFC
Rules for classification: Tiebreakers
Notes:
10 February 2020
18:40 UTC+4

Al-Jaish (Syria)	0–0	(Bahrain) Manama
	Live Report; Stats Report

Khalid bin Mohammed Stadium, Sharjah (United Arab Emirates) (Note: Teams from Syria are not allowed to host their home matches in their country due to security concerns.)
Attendance: 120
Referee: Sivakorn Pu-udom (Thailand)
10 February 2020
19:00 UTC+2

Al-Ahed (Lebanon)	2–1	(Palestine) Hilal Al-Quds
Al Ali 56'; Zreik 84'	Live Report; Stats Report	Mahamid 15'

Camille Chamoun Sports City Stadium, Beirut
Attendance: 1,723
Referee: Minoru Tōjō (Japan)

24 February 2020
18:00 UTC+3

Manama (Bahrain)	1–0	(Lebanon) Al-Ahed
Al-Anezi 69'	Live Report; Stats Report

Khalifa Sports City Stadium, Isa Town
Attendance: 403
Referee: Yu Ming-hsun (Chinese Taipei)
24 February 2020
18:00 UTC+2

Hilal Al-Quds (Palestine)	0–1	(Syria) Al-Jaish
	Live Report; Stats Report	Al Wakid 37'

King Abdullah II Stadium, Amman (Jordan) (Note: Teams from Palestine play their home matches against teams from Lebanon and Syria on neutral venues due to the refusal of the governments of Lebanon and Syria to allow their citizens to pass through Israeli-controlled crossings into the Palestinian territories.)
Attendance: 162
Referee: Adel Al-Naqbi (United Arab Emirates)

26 October 2020
--:-- UTC+3

Hilal Al-Quds (Palestine)	Cancelled	(Bahrain) Manama
	Live Report; Stats Report

26 October 2020
--:-- UTC+3

Al-Ahed (Lebanon)	Cancelled	(Syria) Al-Jaish
	Live Report; Stats Report

29 October 2020
--:-- UTC+3

Manama (Bahrain)	Cancelled	(Palestine) Hilal Al-Quds
	Live Report; Stats Report

29 October 2020
--:-- UTC+3

Al-Jaish (Syria)	Cancelled	(Lebanon) Al-Ahed
	Live Report; Stats Report

1 November 2020
--:-- UTC+3

Hilal Al-Quds (Palestine)	Cancelled	(Lebanon) Al-Ahed
	Live Report; Stats Report

1 November 2020
--:-- UTC+3

Manama (Bahrain)	Cancelled	(Syria) Al-Jaish
	Live Report; Stats Report

4 November 2020
--:-- UTC+3

Al-Ahed (Lebanon)	Cancelled	(Bahrain) Manama
	Live Report; Stats Report

4 November 2020
--:-- UTC+3

Al-Jaish (Syria)	Cancelled	(Palestine) Hilal Al-Quds
	Live Report; Stats Report

=== Group B ===
Pos	Team	Pld	W	D	L	GF	GA	GD	Pts	KWT	ANS	WAT	FAI
1	Al-Kuwait	2	1	1	0	1	0	+1	4	—	1–0	~~4 Nov~~	~~29 Oct~~
2	(Lebanon) Al-Ansar	2	1	0	1	4	4	0	3	~~1 Nov~~	—	~~29 Oct~~	4–3
3	(Syria) Al-Wathba	2	0	2	0	0	0	0	2	0–0	~~26 Oct~~	—	~~1 Nov~~
4	(Jordan) Al-Faisaly	2	0	1	1	3	4	−1	1	~~26 Oct~~	~~4 Nov~~	0–0	—

Source: AFC
Rules for classification: Tiebreakers
10 February 2020
18:00 UTC+3

Al-Kuwait	1–0	(Lebanon) Al-Ansar
Al Buraiki 17'	Live Report; Stats Report

Al Kuwait Sports Club Stadium, Kuwait City
Attendance: 1,000
Referee: Kim Hee-gon (South Korea)
10 February 2020
18:00 UTC+2

Al-Faisaly (Jordan)	0–0	(Syria) Al-Wathba
	Live Report; Stats Report

Amman International Stadium, Amman
Attendance: 3,624
Referee: Mohd Amirul Izwan Yaacob (Malaysia)

24 February 2020
18:45 UTC+4

Al-Wathba (Syria)	0–0	Al-Kuwait
	Live Report; Stats Report

Zabeel Stadium, Dubai (United Arab Emirates)
Attendance: 203
Referee: Sadullo Gulmurodi (Tajikistan)
24 February 2020
19:00 UTC+2

Al-Ansar (Lebanon)	4–3	(Jordan) Al-Faisaly
Maatouk 16'; Tall 42', 90+4' (pen.); Shibriko 51'	Live Report; Stats Report	Al-Jbarat 10'; Hamdouni 61', 82'

Camille Chamoun Sports City Stadium, Beirut
Attendance: 4,977
Referee: Sivakorn Pu-udom (Thailand)

26 October 2020
--:-- UTC+3

Al-Wathba (Syria)	Cancelled	(Lebanon) Al-Ansar
	Live Report; Stats Report

26 October 2020
--:-- UTC+3

Al-Faisaly (Jordan)	Cancelled	Al-Kuwait
	Live Report; Stats Report

29 October 2020
--:-- UTC+3

Al-Ansar (Lebanon)	Cancelled	(Syria) Al-Wathba
	Live Report; Stats Report

29 October 2020
--:-- UTC+3

Al-Kuwait	Cancelled	(Jordan) Al-Faisaly
	Live Report; Stats Report

1 November 2020
--:-- UTC+3

Al-Wathba (Syria)	Cancelled	(Jordan) Al-Faisaly
	Live Report; Stats Report

1 November 2020
--:-- UTC+3

Al-Ansar (Lebanon)	Cancelled	Al-Kuwait
	Live Report; Stats Report

4 November 2020
--:-- UTC+3

Al-Faisaly (Jordan)	Cancelled	(Lebanon) Al-Ansar
	Live Report; Stats Report

4 November 2020
--:-- UTC+3

Al-Kuwait	Cancelled	(Syria) Al-Wathba
	Live Report; Stats Report

=== Group C ===
Pos	Team	Pld	W	D	L	GF	GA	GD	Pts	QAD	DHO	RIF	JAZ
1	(Kuwait) Al-Qadsia	1	1	0	0	2	1	+1	3 (Note: Head-to-head points (GD): Al-Qadsia 3 (+1), Dhofar 0 (0), Al-Riffa 0 (–1).)	—	~~23 Oct~~	~~1 Nov~~	~~26 Oct~~
2	(Oman) Dhofar	1	1	0	0	1	0	+1	3	~~4 Nov~~	—	~~29 Oct~~	1–0
3	(Bahrain) Al-Riffa	2	1	0	1	3	2	+1	3	1–2	~~26 Oct~~	—	~~4 Nov~~
4	(Jordan) Al-Jazeera	2	0	0	2	0	3	−3	0	~~29 Oct~~	~~1 Nov~~	0–2	—

Source: AFC
Rules for classification: Tiebreakers
Notes:
11 February 2020
18:00 UTC+3

Al-Riffa (Bahrain)	1–2	(Kuwait) Al-Qadsia
Marhoon 81'	Live Report; Stats Report	S. Al Enezi 25'; Al Hashan 74' (pen.)

Khalifa Sports City Stadium, Isa Town
Attendance: 1,250
Referee: Yusuke Araki (Japan)
11 February 2020
19:30 UTC+4

Dhofar (Oman)	1–0	(Jordan) Al-Jazeera
Al-Muqbali 60' (pen.)	Live Report; Stats Report

Salalah Sports Complex, Salalah
Attendance: 1,700
Referee: Kim Jong-hyeok (South Korea)

25 February 2020
17:00 UTC+2

Al-Jazeera (Jordan)	0–2	(Bahrain) Al-Riffa
	Live Report; Stats Report	Haram 7'; Soulah 90+2'

Amman International Stadium, Amman
Attendance: 93
Referee: Shaun Evans (Australia)

23 October 2020
--:-- UTC+3

Al-Qadsia (Kuwait)	Cancelled	(Oman) Dhofar
	Live Report; Stats Report

26 October 2020
--:-- UTC+3

Al-Qadsia (Kuwait)	Cancelled	(Jordan) Al-Jazeera
	Live Report; Stats Report

26 October 2020
--:-- UTC+3

Al-Riffa (Bahrain)	Cancelled	(Oman) Dhofar
	Live Report; Stats Report

29 October 2020
--:-- UTC+3

Al-Jazeera (Jordan)	Cancelled	(Kuwait) Al-Qadsia
	Live Report; Stats Report

29 October 2020
--:-- UTC+3

Dhofar (Oman)	Cancelled	(Bahrain) Al-Riffa
	Live Report; Stats Report

1 November 2020
--:-- UTC+2

Al-Qadsia (Kuwait)	Cancelled	(Bahrain) Al-Riffa
	Live Report; Stats Report

1 November 2020
--:-- UTC+2

Al-Jazeera (Jordan)	Cancelled	(Oman) Dhofar
	Live Report; Stats Report

4 November 2020
--:-- UTC+2

Al-Riffa (Bahrain)	Cancelled	(Jordan) Al-Jazeera
	Live Report; Stats Report

4 November 2020
--:-- UTC+2

Dhofar (Oman)	Cancelled	(Kuwait) Al-Qadsia
	Live Report; Stats Report

=== Group D ===
Pos	Team	Pld	W	D	L	GF	GA	GD	Pts	IST	ALT	DOR	KHU
1	(Tajikistan) Istiklol	1	1	0	0	2	0	+2	3	—	~~4 Nov~~	~~26 Oct~~	2–0
2	(Turkmenistan) Altyn Asyr	0	0	0	0	0	0	0	0	~~23 Oct~~	—	~~1 Nov~~	~~29 Oct~~
3	(Kyrgyzstan) Dordoi	0	0	0	0	0	0	0	0	~~29 Oct~~	~~20 Oct~~	—	~~4 Nov~~
4	(Tajikistan) Khujand	1	0	0	1	0	2	−2	0	~~1 Nov~~	~~26 Oct~~	~~23 Oct~~	—

Source: AFC
Rules for classification: Tiebreakers
11 March 2020
18:00 UTC+5

Istiklol (Tajikistan)	2–0	(Tajikistan) Khujand
M. Dzhalilov 21', 29' (pen.)	Live Report; Stats Report

Pamir Stadium, Dushanbe
Attendance: 0 (Note: Due to concerns of the COVID-19 pandemic in Tajikistan, the match between Istiklol and Khujand was played behind closed doors.)
Referee: Ahmad Al-Ali (Kuwait)

20 October 2020
--:--

Dordoi (Kyrgyzstan)	Cancelled	(Turkmenistan) Altyn Asyr
	Live Report; Stats Report

23 October 2020
--:--

Khujand (Tajikistan)	Cancelled	(Kyrgyzstan) Dordoi
	Live Report; Stats Report

23 October 2020
--:--

Altyn Asyr (Turkmenistan)	Cancelled	(Tajikistan) Istiklol
	Live Report; Stats Report

26 October 2020
--:--

Khujand (Tajikistan)	Cancelled	(Turkmenistan) Altyn Asyr
	Live Report; Stats Report

26 October 2020
--:--

Istiklol (Tajikistan)	Cancelled	(Kyrgyzstan) Dordoi
	Live Report; Stats Report

29 October 2020
--:--

Altyn Asyr (Turkmenistan)	Cancelled	(Tajikistan) Khujand
	Live Report; Stats Report

29 October 2020
--:--

Dordoi (Kyrgyzstan)	Cancelled	(Tajikistan) Istiklol
	Live Report; Stats Report

1 November 2020
--:--

Khujand (Tajikistan)	Cancelled	(Tajikistan) Istiklol
	Live Report; Stats Report

1 November 2020
--:--

Altyn Asyr (Turkmenistan)	Cancelled	(Kyrgyzstan) Dordoi
	Live Report; Stats Report

4 November 2020
--:--

Istiklol (Tajikistan)	Cancelled	(Turkmenistan) Altyn Asyr
	Live Report; Stats Report

4 November 2020
--:--

Dordoi (Kyrgyzstan)	Cancelled	(Tajikistan) Khujand
	Live Report; Stats Report

=== Group E ===
Pos	Team	Pld	W	D	L	GF	GA	GD	Pts	BAS	MAZ	CHE	TCS
1	(Bangladesh) Bashundhara Kings	1	1	0	0	5	1	+4	3	—	~~4 Nov~~	~~29 Oct~~	5–1
2	(Maldives) Maziya	1	0	1	0	2	2	0	1 (Note: Head-to-head away goals: Maziya 2, Chennai City 0.)	~~23 Oct~~	—	~~1 Nov~~	~~26 Oct~~
3	(India) Chennai City	1	0	1	0	2	2	0	1	~~26 Oct~~	2–2	—	~~4 Nov~~
4	(Maldives) TC Sports	1	0	0	1	1	5	−4	0	~~1 Nov~~	~~29 Oct~~	~~23 Oct~~	—

Source: AFC
Rules for classification: Tiebreakers
Notes:
11 March 2020
15:30 UTC+6

Bashundhara Kings (Bangladesh)	5–1	(Maldives) TC Sports
Barcos 18', 26', 68' (pen.), 90+2'; Colindres 76'	Live Report; Stats Report	Easa 21'

Bangabandhu National Stadium, Dhaka (Note: Bashundhara Kings play their home matches at Bangabandhu National Stadium, Dhaka, instead of their regular home stadium Sheikh Kamal Stadium, Nilphamari.)
Attendance: 4,200
Referee: Shuan Evans (Australia)
11 March 2020
19:30 UTC+5:30

Chennai City (India)	2–2	(Maldives) Maziya
Fito 11', 90'	Live Report; Stats Report	Irufaan 64'; Mahudhee 67'

Jawaharlal Nehru Stadium, Chennai
Attendance: 6,277
Referee: Omar Al-Yaqoubi (Oman)

23 October 2020
15:30 UTC+5

Maziya (Maldives)	Cancelled	(Bangladesh) Bashundhara Kings
	Live Report; Stats Report

National Football Stadium, Malé
23 October 2020
21:30 UTC+5

TC Sports (Maldives)	Cancelled	(India) Chennai City
	Live Report; Stats Report

National Football Stadium, Malé

26 October 2020
15:30 UTC+5

Maziya (Maldives)	Cancelled	(Maldives) TC Sports
	Live Report; Stats Report

National Football Stadium, Malé
26 October 2020
21:30 UTC+5

Chennai City (India)	Cancelled	(Bangladesh) Bashundhara Kings
	Live Report; Stats Report

National Football Stadium, Malé

29 October 2020
15:30 UTC+5

TC Sports (Maldives)	Cancelled	(Maldives) Maziya
	Live Report; Stats Report

National Football Stadium, Malé
29 October 2020
21:30 UTC+5

Bashundhara Kings (Bangladesh)	Cancelled	(India) Chennai City
	Live Report; Stats Report

National Football Stadium, Malé

1 November 2020
15:30 UTC+5

Maziya (Maldives)	Cancelled	(India) Chennai City
	Live Report; Stats Report

National Football Stadium, Malé
1 November 2020
21:30 UTC+5

TC Sports (Maldives)	Cancelled	(Bangladesh) Bashundhara Kings
	Live Report; Stats Report

National Football Stadium, Malé

4 November 2020
15:30 UTC+5

Chennai City (India)	Cancelled	(Maldives) TC Sports
	Live Report; Stats Report

National Football Stadium, Malé
4 November 2020
21:30 UTC+5

Bashundhara Kings (Bangladesh)	Cancelled	(Maldives) Maziya
	Live Report; Stats Report

National Football Stadium, Malé

=== Group F ===
Pos	Team	Pld	W	D	L	GF	GA	GD	Pts	HCM	YAN	HOU	LTO
1	(Vietnam) Hồ Chí Minh City	3	2	1	0	7	4	+3	7 (Note: Head-to-head away goals: Hồ Chí Minh City 2, Yangon United 0.)	—	~~26 Sep~~	~~29 Sep~~	~~23 Sep~~
2	(Myanmar) Yangon United	3	2	1	0	6	4	+2	7	2–2	—	1–0	3–2
3	(Singapore) Hougang United	3	1	0	2	5	5	0	3	2–3	~~23 Sep~~	—	~~26 Sep~~
4	(Laos) Lao Toyota	3	0	0	3	3	8	−5	0	0–2	~~29 Sep~~	1–3	—

Source: AFC
Rules for classification: Tiebreakers
Notes:
11 February 2020 (Note: Due to the decision of the Vietnamese government to suspend sport activities in February in response to the COVID-19 pandemic in Vietnam, the group stage matches which Vietnamese teams were supposed to host on matchdays 1 and 2 would be switched with the corresponding away matches.)
15:30 UTC+6:30

Yangon United (Myanmar)	2–2	(Vietnam) Hồ Chí Minh City
Uzochukwu 15'; Maung Maung Win 19'	Live Report; Stats Report	Baldé 11'; Nguyễn Công Phượng 42'

Thuwunna Stadium, Yangon
Attendance: 584
Referee: Sherzod Kasimov (Uzbekistan)
11 February 2020
18:30 UTC+7

Lao Toyota (Laos)	1–3	(Singapore) Hougang United
Jerković 15'	Live Report; Stats Report	Machell 39'; Plazibat 53', 82' (pen.)

New Laos National Stadium, Vientiane
Attendance: 1,215
Referee: Ali Abdulnabi (Bahrain)

25 February 2020
15:30 UTC+6:30

Yangon United (Myanmar)	3–2	(Laos) Lao Toyota
Aung Kyaw Naing 18', 84'; Maung Maung Lwin 29'	Live Report; Stats Report	Kawakami 58'; Laércio 90+2' (pen.)

Thuwunna Stadium, Yangon
Attendance: 504
Referee: Ali Reda (Lebanon)
25 February 2020
19:30 UTC+8

Hougang United (Singapore)	2–3	(Vietnam) Hồ Chí Minh City
Plazibat 77' (pen.), 79'	Live Report; Stats Report	Nguyễn Công Phượng 15'; Baldé 45', 59'

Jalan Besar Stadium, Singapore (Note: Hougang United play their home matches at Jalan Besar Stadium and Jurong West Stadium, Singapore, instead of their regular home stadium Hougang Stadium, Singapore.)
Attendance: 873
Referee: Kim Dae-yong (South Korea)

10 March 2020
15:30 UTC+6:30

Yangon United (Myanmar)	1–0	(Singapore) Hougang United
Than Paing 81'	Live Report; Stats Report

Thuwunna Stadium, Yangon
Attendance: 547
Referee: Jonathan Barreiro (Australia)
10 March 2020 (Note: Due to the Lao New Year in mid-April, the home match of Lao Toyota against Hồ Chí Minh City would be switched with the corresponding away match.)
18:30 UTC+7

Lao Toyota (Laos)	0–2	(Vietnam) Hồ Chí Minh City
	Live Report; Stats Report	Nguyễn Xuân Nam 72', 90'

New Laos National Stadium, Vientiane
Attendance: 0 (Note: Due to concerns of the COVID-19 pandemic in Laos, the match between Lao Toyota and Hồ Chí Minh City was played behind closed doors.)
Referee: Zaid Thamer (Iraq)

23 September 2020
--:-- UTC+7

Hougang United (Singapore)	Cancelled	(Myanmar) Yangon United
	Live Report; Stats Report

Thống Nhất Stadium, Ho Chi Minh City
23 September 2020
--:-- UTC+7

Hồ Chí Minh City (Vietnam)	Cancelled	(Laos) Lao Toyota
	Live Report; Stats Report

Thống Nhất Stadium, Ho Chi Minh City

26 September 2020
--:-- UTC+7

Hồ Chí Minh City (Vietnam)	Cancelled	(Myanmar) Yangon United
	Live Report; Stats Report

Thống Nhất Stadium, Ho Chi Minh City
26 September 2020
--:-- UTC+7

Hougang United (Singapore)	Cancelled	(Laos) Lao Toyota
	Live Report; Stats Report

Thống Nhất Stadium, Ho Chi Minh City

29 September 2020
--:-- UTC+7

Hồ Chí Minh City (Vietnam)	Cancelled	(Singapore) Hougang United
	Live Report; Stats Report

Thống Nhất Stadium, Ho Chi Minh City
29 September 2020
--:-- UTC+7

Lao Toyota (Laos)	Cancelled	(Myanmar) Yangon United
	Live Report; Stats Report

Thống Nhất Stadium, Ho Chi Minh City

=== Group G ===
Pos	Team	Pld	W	D	L	GF	GA	GD	Pts	CER	TQN	SVR	BAL
1	(Philippines) Ceres–Negros	3	2	1	0	10	2	+8	7	—	2–2	4–0	4–0
2	(Vietnam) Than Quảng Ninh	3	1	1	1	7	7	0	4	~~29 Sep~~	—	~~23 Sep~~	~~26 Sep~~
3	(Cambodia) Svay Rieng	3	1	0	2	3	9	−6	3 (Note: Head-to-head points: Svay Rieng 3, Bali United 0.)	~~26 Sep~~	1–4	—	2–1
4	(Indonesia) Bali United	3	1	0	2	5	7	−2	3	~~23 Sep~~	4–1	~~29 Sep~~	—

Source: AFC
Rules for classification: Tiebreakers
Notes:
11 February 2020
19:30 UTC+8

Ceres–Negros (Philippines)	4–0	(Cambodia) Svay Rieng
Odawara 12'; Grommen 14'; Marañón 55', 70'	Live Report; Stats Report

Rizal Memorial Stadium, Manila (Note: Ceres–Negros (United City) play their home matches at Rizal Memorial Stadium, Manila, instead of their regular home stadium Panaad Stadium, Bacolod.)
Attendance: 4,146
Referee: C. R. Srikrishna (India)
11 February 2020
19:30 UTC+8

Bali United (Indonesia)	4–1	(Vietnam) Than Quảng Ninh
Rahmat 46'; Platje 50', 77'; Spasojević 73' (pen.)	Live Report; Stats Report	Lynch 20'

Kapten I Wayan Dipta Stadium, Gianyar Regency
Attendance: 5,750
Referee: Masoud Tufayelieh (Syria)

25 February 2020
18:00 UTC+7

Svay Rieng (Cambodia)	2–1	(Indonesia) Bali United
Hoy 12'; Mbarga 19'	Live Report; Stats Report	Spasojević 59'

Phnom Penh Olympic Stadium, Phnom Penh (Note: Svay Rieng play their home matches at Phnom Penh Olympic Stadium, Phnom Penh, instead of their regular home stadium Svay Rieng Stadium, Svay Rieng.)
Attendance: 2,106
Referee: Mahmood Al-Majarafi (Oman)
25 February 2020
19:30 UTC+8

Ceres–Negros (Philippines)	2–2	(Vietnam) Than Quảng Ninh
Marañón 45+3' (pen.); Porteria 62'	Live Report; Stats Report	Lynch 26'; Nguyễn Hải Huy 70'

Rizal Memorial Stadium, Manila
Attendance: 5,078
Referee: Mohd Amirul Izwan Yaacob (Malaysia)

11 March 2020
18:00 UTC+7

Svay Rieng (Cambodia)	1–4	(Vietnam) Than Quảng Ninh
Mbarga 45'	Live Report; Stats Report	Nguyễn Hải Huy 36'; Laštro 57'; Lynch 77'; Đào Nhật Minh 86'

Phnom Penh Olympic Stadium, Phnom Penh
Attendance: 2,349
Referee: Baraa Aisha (Palestine)
11 March 2020
19:30 UTC+8

Ceres–Negros (Philippines)	4–0	(Indonesia) Bali United
Porteria 35'; Marañón 54' (pen.), 69'; Lopez 73'	Live Report; Stats Report

Rizal Memorial Stadium, Manila
Attendance: 1 (Note: The match between Ceres–Negros and Bali United in Manila was played behind closed doors due to the COVID-19 pandemic in the Philippines.)
Referee: Sadullo Gulmurodi (Tajikistan)

23 September 2020
--:-- UTC+7

Than Quảng Ninh (Vietnam)	Cancelled	(Cambodia) Svay Rieng
	Live Report; Stats Report

Cẩm Phả Stadium, Cẩm Phả
23 September 2020
--:-- UTC+7

Bali United (Indonesia)	Cancelled	(Philippines) Ceres–Negros
	Live Report; Stats Report

Cẩm Phả Stadium, Cẩm Phả

26 September 2020
--:-- UTC+7

Svay Rieng (Cambodia)	Cancelled	(Philippines) Ceres–Negros
	Live Report; Stats Report

Cẩm Phả Stadium, Cẩm Phả
26 September 2020
--:-- UTC+7

Than Quảng Ninh (Vietnam)	Cancelled	(Indonesia) Bali United
	Live Report; Stats Report

Cẩm Phả Stadium, Cẩm Phả

29 September 2020
--:-- UTC+7

Than Quảng Ninh (Vietnam)	Cancelled	(Philippines) Ceres–Negros
	Live Report; Stats Report

Cẩm Phả Stadium, Cẩm Phả
29 September 2020
--:-- UTC+7

Bali United (Indonesia)	Cancelled	(Cambodia) Svay Rieng
	Live Report; Stats Report

Cẩm Phả Stadium, Cẩm Phả

=== Group H ===
Pos	Team	Pld	W	D	L	GF	GA	GD	Pts	TAM	KAY	PSM	SHA
1	(Singapore) Tampines Rovers	3	2	1	0	4	2	+2	7	—	~~29 Sep~~	2–1	2–1
2	(Philippines) Kaya–Iloilo	3	1	2	0	3	1	+2	5	0–0	—	~~23 Sep~~	~~26 Sep~~
3	(Indonesia) PSM Makassar	3	1	1	1	5	4	+1	4	~~26 Sep~~	1–1	—	3–1
4	(Myanmar) Shan United	3	0	0	3	2	7	−5	0	~~23 Sep~~	0–2	~~29 Sep~~	—

Source: AFC
Rules for classification: Tiebreakers
12 February 2020
15:30 UTC+6:30

Shan United (Myanmar)	0–2	(Philippines) Kaya–Iloilo
	Live Report; Stats Report	Bedic 74' (pen.); Giganto 85'

Thuwunna Stadium, Yangon
Attendance: 438
Referee: Saoud Al-Athbah (Qatar)
12 February 2020
19:45 UTC+8

Tampines Rovers (Singapore)	2–1	(Indonesia) PSM Makassar
Webb 24'; Kopitović 64'	Live Report; Stats Report	Sinaga 68'

Jalan Besar Stadium, Singapore (Note: Tampines Rovers play their home matches at Jalan Besar Stadium and Jurong West Stadium, Singapore, instead of their regular home stadium Our Tampines Hub, Singapore.)
Attendance: 1,266
Referee: Mooud Bonyadifar (Iran)

26 February 2020
15:30 UTC+7

PSM Makassar (Indonesia)	3–1	(Myanmar) Shan United
Giancarlo 3'; Sayuri 53'; Sinaga 90+5'	Live Report; Stats Report	Htet Phyo Wai 78'

Gelora Bung Karno Madya Stadium, Jakarta (Note: PSM Makassar play their home matches at Gelora Bung Karno Madya Stadium, Jakarta, instead of their regular home stadium Andi Mattalata Stadium, Makassar, since the stadium did not meet AFC regulations.)
Attendance: 786
Referee: Yudai Yamamoto (Japan)
26 February 2020
19:00 UTC+8

Kaya–Iloilo (Philippines)	0–0	(Singapore) Tampines Rovers
	Live Report; Stats Report

Rizal Memorial Stadium, Manila (Note: Kaya–Iloilo play their home matches at Rizal Memorial Stadium, Manila, instead of their regular home stadium Iloilo Sports Complex, Iloilo City.)
Attendance: 412
Referee: Hussein Abo Yehia (Lebanon)

10 March 2020
15:30 UTC+7

PSM Makassar (Indonesia)	1–1	(Philippines) Kaya–Iloilo
Saha 22'	Live Report; Stats Report	Giganto 50'

Gelora Bung Karno Madya Stadium, Jakarta
Attendance: 0 (Note: The match between PSM Makassar and Kaya–Iloilo in Jakarta was played behind closed doors due to the COVID-19 pandemic in Indonesia.)
Referee: C. R. Srikrishna (India)
10 March 2020
19:45 UTC+8

Tampines Rovers (Singapore)	2–1	(Myanmar) Shan United
Kopitović 55'; Webb 71'	Live Report; Stats Report	Hein Phyo Win 90+1'

Jurong West Stadium, Singapore
Attendance: 450
Referee: Chen Hsin-chuan (Chinese Taipei)

23 September 2020
--:--

Kaya–Iloilo (Philippines)	Cancelled	(Indonesia) PSM Makassar
	Live Report; Stats Report

23 September 2020
--:--

Shan United (Myanmar)	Cancelled	(Singapore) Tampines Rovers
	Live Report; Stats Report

26 September 2020
--:--

PSM Makassar (Indonesia)	Cancelled	(Singapore) Tampines Rovers
	Live Report; Stats Report

26 September 2020
--:--

Kaya–Iloilo (Philippines)	Cancelled	(Myanmar) Shan United
	Live Report; Stats Report

29 September 2020
--:--

Tampines Rovers (Singapore)	Cancelled	(Philippines) Kaya–Iloilo
	Live Report; Stats Report

29 September 2020
--:--

Shan United (Myanmar)	Cancelled	(Indonesia) PSM Makassar
	Live Report; Stats Report

=== Group I ===
Pos	Team	Pld	W	D	L	GF	GA	GD	Pts	KIT	TAT	CPK	I4
1	(Hong Kong) Kitchee	0	0	0	0	0	0	0	0	—	~~4 Nov~~	~~26 Oct~~	~~20 Oct~~
2	(Chinese Taipei) Tatung	0	0	0	0	0	0	0	0	~~23 Oct~~	—	~~1 Nov~~	~~29 Oct~~
3	(Macau) MUST CPK	0	0	0	0	0	0	0	0	~~29 Oct~~	~~20 Oct~~	—	~~4 Nov~~
4	Winners of Play-off East Asia	0	0	0	0	0	0	0	0	~~1 Nov~~	~~26 Oct~~	~~23 Oct~~	—

Source: AFC
Rules for classification: Tiebreakers
20 October 2020
--:--

Kitchee (Hong Kong)	Cancelled	Winners of Play-off East Asia
	Live Report; Stats Report

20 October 2020
--:--

MUST CPK (Macau)	Cancelled	(Chinese Taipei) Tatung
	Live Report; Stats Report

23 October 2020
--:--

Winners of Play-off East Asia	Cancelled	(Macau) MUST CPK
	Live Report; Stats Report

23 October 2020
--:--

Tatung (Chinese Taipei)	Cancelled	(Hong Kong) Kitchee
	Live Report; Stats Report

26 October 2020
--:--

Winners of Play-off East Asia	Cancelled	(Chinese Taipei) Tatung
	Live Report; Stats Report

26 October 2020
--:--

Kitchee (Hong Kong)	Cancelled	(Macau) MUST CPK
	Live Report; Stats Report

29 October 2020
--:--

Tatung (Chinese Taipei)	Cancelled	Winners of Play-off East Asia
	Live Report; Stats Report

29 October 2020
--:--

MUST CPK (Macau)	Cancelled	(Hong Kong) Kitchee
	Live Report; Stats Report

1 November 2020
--:--

Winners of Play-off East Asia	Cancelled	(Hong Kong) Kitchee
	Live Report; Stats Report

1 November 2020
--:--

Tatung (Chinese Taipei)	Cancelled	(Macau) MUST CPK
	Live Report; Stats Report

4 November 2020
--:--

Kitchee (Hong Kong)	Cancelled	(Chinese Taipei) Tatung
	Live Report; Stats Report

4 November 2020
--:--

MUST CPK (Macau)	Cancelled	Winners of Play-off East Asia
	Live Report; Stats Report
