= 2018–19 Sultan Qaboos Cup =

Tournament details
- Country: Oman
- Dates: 6 September 2018 – 19 April 2019

The 2018–19 Sultan Qaboos Cup is the 46th season of the Sultan Qaboos Cup, the national football cup competition of Oman. The winners of the competition will earn a spot in the 2020 AFC Cup.

== First qualifying round ==
The matches were played on 6 September 2018.

6 September 2018	Al-Mussanah	4–1	Al-Hamra

6 September 2018	Ibri	0–1	Yankul

6 September 2018	Diba	5–2	Ahli Sidab

== Second qualifying round ==
The match was played on 10 September 2018.

10 September 2018	Ahli Sidab	2–1	Ibri

== Round of 32 ==
The matches were played on 18–19 September 2018.

18 September 2018	Jaalan	0–1	Bahla

18 September 2018	Bidiyah	1–0	Al-Shabab

18 September 2018	Fanja	3–1	Al-Salam

18 September 2018	Quriyat	0–1	Samail

18 September 2018	Diba	0–1	Sur

18 September 2018	Al-Mudhaibi	0–4	Mirbat

18 September 2018	Al-Hamra	0–1	Al-Mussanah

18 September 2018	Salalah	3–0	Al-Rustaq

18 September 2018	Saham	2–3	Sohar

19 September 2018	Al-Orouba	2–0	Ahli Sidab

19 September 2018	Al-Seeb	2–1 (a.e.t.)	Al-Nasr

19 September 2018	Muscat	0–1	Dhofar

19 September 2018	Al-Wasta	0–2	Yankul

19 September 2018	Al-Bashaer	1–1 (a.e.t.) (5–4 p)	Al-Suwaiq

19 September 2018	Majees	1–0	Al-Nahda

19 September 2018	Nizwa	0–5	Oman

== Round of 16 ==
The matches were played on 7–8 October 2018.

7 October 2018	Samail	0–2	Sohar

7 October 2018	Majees	2–1	Al-Bashaer

7 October 2018	Bahla	0–1	Al-Orouba

7 October 2018	Al-Seeb	3–3 (a.e.t.) (4–3 p)	Dhofar

8 October 2018	Sur	1–0	Bidiyah

8 October 2018	Al-Mussanah	3–1	Yankul

8 October 2018	Salalah	2–4 (a.e.t.)	Mirbat

8 October 2018	Fanja	5–2	Oman

== Quarter-finals ==
The first legs were played on 6 November, and the second legs were played on 4–5 December 2018.

Team 1	Agg.	Team 2	1st leg	2nd leg
Al-Mussanah	1–2	Mirbat	0–1	1–1
Sohar	3–3 (a)	Fanja	2–3	1–0
Al-Seeb	1–1 (a)	Sur	1–1	0–0
Majees	1–0	Al-Orouba	1–0	0–0

== Semi-finals ==
The first legs were played on 6 March, and the second legs were played on 17 March 2019.

Team 1	Agg.	Team 2	1st leg	2nd leg
Majees	2–6	Sur	2–4	0–2
Fanja	7–2	Mirbat	3–2	4–0

== Final ==
11 April 2019

Fanja	1–2 (a.e.t.)	Sur

Referee: Khalid Al Shaqsi
