= Ferdinand Sinaga =

Indonesian footballer (born 1988)

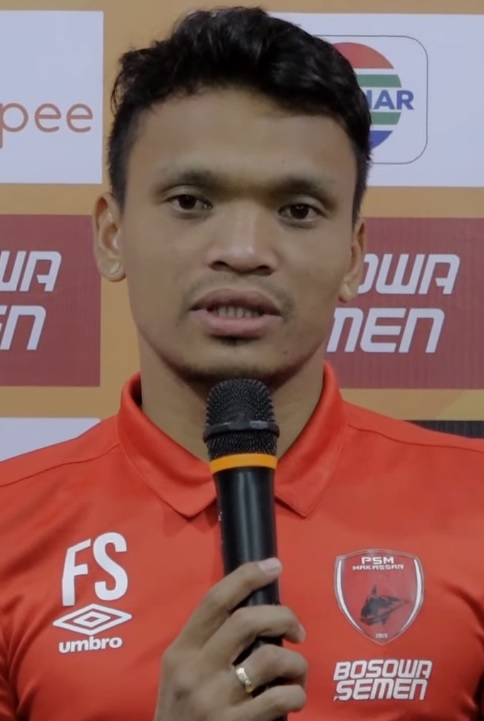
- Ferdinand with PSM Makassar in 2019

Personal information
- Full name: Ferdinand Alfred Sinaga
- Date of birth: 18 September 1988 (age 38)
- Place of birth: Bengkulu, Indonesia
- Height: 1.69 m (5 ft 7 in)
- Position: Forward

Youth career
- 2003–2006: Persib Bandung

Senior career*
| Years | Team | Apps | (Gls) |
| 2006–2007 | Persibat Batang | 14 | (2) |
| 2007–2008 | Persikab Bandung | 10 | (1) |
| 2008–2009 | Pelita Jaya | 2 | (0) |
| 2009–2010 | PPSM Magelang | 20 | (5) |
| 2010–2011 | Persiwa Wamena | 26 | (10) |
| 2011–2012 | Semen Padang | 22 | (16) |
| 2012–2013 | Putra Samarinda | 18 | (10) |
| 2013–2014 | Persib Bandung | 23 | (11) |
| 2014–2015 | Sriwijaya | 3 | (1) |
| 2016–2017 | PSM Makassar | 51 | (22) |
| 2018 | Kelantan | 5 | (0) |
| 2018–2021 | PSM Makassar | 62 | (20) |
| 2020–2021 | → PSMS Medan (loan) | 0 | (0) |
| 2021 | Persib Bandung | 0 | (0) |
| 2021–2023 | Persis Solo | 41 | (5) |
| 2022 | → PSM Makassar (loan) | 13 | (1) |
| 2023–2024 | Persebaya Surabaya | 5 | (0) |
| 2023–2024 | → Persiraja Banda Aceh (loan) | 13 | (5) |
| 2024 | Persekat Tegal | 7 | (3) |
| 2024–2025 | Persiba Balikpapan | 8 | (2) |
| 2025–2026 | Persibat Batang | | |
| 2026 | Persma 1960 | 3 | (1) |

International career
| 2009–2014 | Indonesia U23 | 10 | (8) |
| 2011–2019 | Indonesia | 20 | (0) |
Medal record
Men's football
Representing Indonesia
Southeast Asian Games
| Silver medal – second place | 2011 Jakarta-Palembang | Team |
AFF Championship
| Runner-up | 2016 Myanmar & Philippines | Team |
- * Club domestic league appearances and goals as of 9 April 2026

Ferdinand Alfred Sinaga (born 18 September 1988), nicknamed The Dragon, is an Indonesian professional footballer who plays as a forward.

== Club career ==
=== Persib Bandung ===
Ahead of the 2014 Indonesia Super League, Sinaga signed a contract with Persib Bandung. He welcomed the contract. According to him, this makes him even more confident that he has chosen the right club. He opens up opportunities to continue playing with Persib after his contract expires in two years.

He made his league debut on 2 February 2014, coming on as a starter in a 1–0 home win against Sriwijaya. Three days later, Sinaga scored his first league goal for Maung Bandung, scoring equalizer in a 2–1 home win against Persita Tangerang at Jalak Harupat Stadium. In March 2014, Sinaga was banned for two matches by the Football Association of Indonesia for excessively cursing at a referee in a match against Semen Padang on 16 February 2014. He missed Persib's next matches against PS Barito Putera and Arema Cronus. In addition to the ban, he was also fined 25 million rupiahs for his behavior. On 20 April, he scored a brace for Persib in a 1–4 away win against Gresik United. On 20 May, in a match against Pelita Bandung Raya, he was involved in an incident with Latvian international, Deniss Romanovs in the 50th minute. The incident began when he started taking Romanovs' towel and dousing him with water. His actions sparked a scuffle between the two teams, which led to the referee calling a halt to the match. In the same match, Sinaga scored equalizer in the 82nd minute. The game ended in a 2–2 draw. On 25 May, he scored another brace for Persib in a 2–2 draw against Arema Cronus. On 10 June, Sinaga scored a spectacular bicycle kick in a 3–1 win over PS Barito Putera. He juggled the ball twice from a corner kick before unleashing an unstoppable overhead kick into the net. On 10 October, he recorded his tenth goal for the team in a 2–3 win at away to Mitra Kukar. And continued scored again in October in a 3–1 home win against Persebaya Surabaya twelve days later.

Sinaga played in the 2014 Indonesia Super League Final against Persipura Jayapura. Although he did not manage to score in normal time, Sinaga netted the second penalty for Persib in the 5–3 penalty shootout win. On 1 December 2014, Sinaga officially left Persib Bandung, because there was no discussion about the contract from the management. With Persib Bandung this season, he was named the best player in 2014 season, and made 23 appearances and scored 11 goals, two points adrift of Persib Bandung's top scorer Makan Konaté.

=== Sriwijaya ===
On 30 November 2014, he was signed by Sriwijaya. He was outstanding in his first outing at the 2015 SCM Cup pre-season tournament, leading his club to a second-place finish and becoming the tournament's top scorer. Sinaga made his debut on 4 April 2015 in a match against Pelita Bandung Raya. On 7 April 2015, Sinaga scored his first goal for Sriwijaya in the 76th minute against Semen Padang at the Gelora Sriwijaya Stadium, Palembang. In 2015 season, he only played 3 times and scored one goal.

=== PSM Makassar ===
==== 2016 season: Indonesia Soccer Championship era ====
He was signed for PSM Makassar to play in unofficial league Indonesia Soccer Championship A in the 2016 season. Sinaga made his club debut on 29 April 2016, coming on as a starter, also scored his first league goal in 65th minute in a 2–1 away lose against his former club Semen Padang. He then scored a brace in a 3–2 home win over Persiba Balikpapan on 16 July 2016. He added his fourth goals for PSM on 31 July with one goal against Mitra Kukar in a 2–2 draw. Sinaga scored another brace in a 4–0 home win over Bali United on 14 August. With the result, PSM is ranked 13th with 17 points. On 17 October, he recorded his 10th goal for the team in a 2–1 win against Sriwijaya. He contributed with 24 league appearances, scored 10 goals during his 2016 season.

==== 2017 season: Indonesia Liga 1 era ====
Sinaga made his first new official league appearance on 16 April 2017, coming on as a substituted Ghozali Siregar in a 3–1 won against Persela Lamongan. He also picked up his career red card in the 84th minute with PSM Makassar this season. Despite this, Sinaga returned to the first team and playing 31 minutes in second half for the side on 21 May, in a 1–0 win over Sriwijaya. Sinaga scored his first goal of the new season on 18 July, opening the scoring in a 1–1 draw with South Kalimantan club Barito Putera. His form in August saw him score three further goals in wins against Mitra Kukar (1–0), Perseru Serui (2–0), and draw against Arema (3–3). On 10 September, he scored a brace and also provided an assist for PSM Makassar in a 4–1 home win against PS TNI. And scored another brace against Sriwijaya a week later, the game ended in a 3–4 victory for PSM Makassar. Also continued scored his ninth goal of the season in September in a 5–1 home win against Gresik United five days later. His form in October saw him scored his third brace in a 3–1 home win against Persiba Balikpapan on 24 October. and one goal in a 1–2 away win against Barito Putera five days later.

On 3 January 2018, PSM management through its Media Officer, Widya Syadzwina, confirmed that they had officially released Sinaga. However, he has decided to go abroad and there is interest from a Malaysia Super League club to sign him. He contributed with 27 league appearances, scored 12 goals and 2 assists during his 2017 season.

=== Kelantan ===
On 4 January 2018, Sinaga signed a one-year contract with Malaysian Malaysia Super League side Kelantan. He made his league debut for Kelantan FA in 2–1 defeat to Melaka United on 3 February 2018. On 19 March 2018, Sinaga has been released from Kelantan and returned to Indonesian club PSM Makassar.

=== Return to PSM Makassar ===
==== 2018 season ====
In 2018, it was confirmed that Ferdinand Sinaga would re-join PSM Makassar, signing a three-year contract. Sinaga made his debut on 31 March 2018 in a match against Perseru Serui. On 16 April 2018, Sinaga scored his first goal for PSM in the 28th minute against Barito Putera. Five days later, Sinaga scored his second league goal for the club, opening the scoring in the 14th minute in a 4–3 home win over PS TIRA. His form in August saw him score two further goals in draw against Perseru Serui (2–2), and draw again against Persela Lamongan (1–1). He added his fifth goals of the season on 13 September with one goal against Barito Putera in a 1–1 home draw. And continued his good form with the winning goal in a 1–2 away win over PS TIRA six days later. He never seemed to stop scoring, continuing his good form with 1 goal in a 1–4 away win against Mitra Kukar. He added his eighth goals of the season on 4 November with one goal against 2016 Indonesia Soccer Championship A champions Persipura Jayapura in a 4–2 home win. He continued his good form in November with scored a brace in a 4–0 home win over Bali United on 25 November. With 10 goals this season, he is the team's current top-scoring player, behind Guy Junior Ondoua. By the end of the league season, he had contributed with 30 appearances, 10 goals and 2 assists, and PSM Makassar failed to win the championship this season, and finished in second place.

==== 2019 season ====
On 16 February 2019, Sinaga made his Piala Indonesia debut in a 9–0 home win in the first leg of PSM' 2018–19 Piala Indonesia round of 16 against Perseru Serui, also scored his first goal in the 79th minute. And continued scored a brace in the second leg round of 16 against the same opponent four days later. With a 12–0 aggregate win, PSM advanced to the quarterfinals of the 2018–19 Piala Indonesia.

On 13 March 2019, Sinaga made his AFC Cup debut in a 7–3 home win in the 2019 AFC Cup group stage against Lao Toyota, also scored his first international goal in the 80th minute. He continued his good form in July with scored his first goal of the 2019 season in a 2–1 win against Bhayangkara on 13 July. And scored the winning goal in a 2–1 home win over Persebaya Surabaya three days later. Sinaga made his return at home to rivals Persija Jakarta on 6 August in the second second leg of Piala Indonesia final match, he playing the full 90 minutes and leading his team to their first ever Piala Indonesia champions. On 19 September, he scored his third league goal in the fixture against TIRA-Persikabo at the Andi Mattalatta. On 16 October, Sinaga scored two goals each with Marc Klok of the season in a 6–2 home win against Arema. In the last match at Jalak Harupat Stadium on 22 December, Sinaga scored the opening goal as PSM Makassar lose to Persib Bandung 5–2. Sinaga finished as the top scorer at PSM Makassar with 9 goals, and thus became the top-scoring player at PSM Makassar for 3 consecutive seasons.

==== 2020 season ====
Sinaga scored his first goal of the 2020 season, scoring a first hat-trick in the 2020 AFC Cup qualifying play-offs on 22 January 2020 against Liga Futebol Amadora Primeira Divisão club Lalenok United, in a 1–4 win in first leg match. And scored again in second leg play-off round in a 3–1 home win over the same opponent a week later. In the 2020 AFC Cup group stage, he scored one goal each against Singapore club Tampines Rovers on 12 February and Myanmar club Shan United on 26 February.

On 1 March 2020, he started his match in the 2020 Liga 1 season for PSM, playing as a starter and scored his first goal of the season in a 2–1 win over PSS Sleman, scoring a free-kick in the 39th minute and also provided an assist for second goal by Hussein El Dor. His goal against PSS was officially voted the best goal in the first game week of the 2020 Liga 1. The presence of Bojan Hodak who came in to replace the role of last season's coach, Darije Kalezić, he got more minutes to play. Despite this, Sinaga only played 3 times, scoring one goal and one assist for the club because the league was officially discontinued due to the COVID-19 pandemic.

==== PSMS Medan (loan) ====
He was signed for PSMS Medan to play in the Liga 2 in the 2020 season, on loan from PSM Makassar. This season was suspended on 27 March 2020 due to the COVID-19 pandemic. The season was abandoned and was declared void on 20 January 2021.

=== Return to Persib Bandung ===
On 6 March 2021, Sinaga signed a contract with Indonesian Liga 1 club Persib Bandung for 2021 Menpora Cup. Sinaga made his Persib debut in a pre-season 2021 Menpora Cup against Bali United on 24 March. And scored his first goal for the club in a 2–1 win over Persiraja Banda Aceh in the Menpora Cup group stage on 2 April. Sinaga's achievement with Persib was to advance to the final round, he also scored in the second leg of the final, and failed to win the championship because they lost 2–1 to Persija Jakarta on 25 April. The togetherness between Persib Bandung and Sinaga only lasted three months. On 25 June, Persib officially agreed to release Sinaga, he has also submitted a request to play at another Liga 1 club. He was worried about not getting enough minutes to play.

=== Persis Solo ===
On 25 June 2021, Sinaga signed a contract with Indonesian Liga 2 club Persis Solo, he was transferred from Persib Bandung. He made his league debut on 5 October against Persijap Jepara at the Manahan Stadium, Surakarta. On 23 November, Sinaga scored his first goal for Persis in a 1–3 win over Hizbul Wathan. On 22 December, Sinaga scored a brace for the club in a 2–0 victory over Persiba Balikpapan, with his two goals, he led Persis Solo to qualify for the 2021–22 Liga 2 semi-final as Group X runner-up.

He had a good season in this season with 14 appearances and 3 goals, while helping Persis Solo win the championship Liga 2 this season, as well as promotion to the highest caste Liga 1 next season.

==== PSM Makassar (loan) ====
On 4 January 2022, Sinaga signed a contract with Indonesian Liga 1 club PSM Makassar, on loan from Persis Solo. He made his league debut on 8 January 2022 in a match against Madura United at the Ngurah Rai Stadium, Denpasar. On 25 Match 2022, Sinaga scored his first league goal for PSM Makassar, scoring the winning goal in a 1–0 over Persiraja Banda Aceh, this victory also saved PSM Makassar from the relegation zone. During the rest of 2021–22 Liga 1, he made 13 league appearances and scored one goal for PSM Makassar. With his loan status having expired, he decided return to Persis Solo.

==== Return to Persis Solo ====
After his loan ended with PSM Makassar and he returned to Persis Solo on 16 April 2022. He made his new league debut on 25 July 2022 in a 2–3 lose against Dewa United. On 19 August 2022, He marked his first win with Persis in 2022–23 Liga 1 in a 0–1 away win over Bhayangkara.

Sinaga scored his first league goal for the club, scoring in the 65th minute in a 1–3 home lose over Bhayangkara on 22 February 2023. In the last match at Maguwoharjo Stadium on 13 April, Sinaga scored the winning goal as PSM Makassar win to Persik Kediri 1–0. On 16 April, Sinaga has been released from Persis Solo. In the second round of the 2022–23 Liga 1, he is often the first choice, especially after the presence of a new coach, Leonardo Medina. Previously, he was more often on the bench, In total, in the 2022–23 Liga 1, he contributed in 27 appearances with scoring 2 goals and 1 assist.

=== Persebaya Surabaya ===
Ahead of the 2023–24 season, Sinaga signed a contract with Persebaya Surabaya. Sinaga made his Persebaya debut in a pre-season friendly against 2021–22 league champions Bali United on 28 May 2023, also scored his first goal for the club in a 3–1 win.

== International career ==
Sinaga has played for Indonesia at youth and senior level. Sinaga has played in 2011 Southeast Asian Games where his side lost with a penalty kick against Malaysia in the final. Sinaga also has represented Indonesia U-23 at 2014 Asian Games in South Korea. He has scored 6 goals during that tournament.

Sinaga was first capped for senior team on 27 August 2011 in a 0–1 friendly defeat against Jordan at the Amman International Stadium, Amman coming off the bench for Cristian Gonzáles.

== Personal life ==
Sinaga's nickname, The Dragon, originated from his former coach, Robert René Alberts, at PSM in 2016. Alberts called Sinaga by the nickname due to his clan's (marga) name of Sinaga, which in English means 'The Dragon'.

Sinaga is a devout Catholic who often celebrates goals by making the sign of the cross. Sinaga was born to Samson Sinaga, a bus driver, and Risnalu Turnip. He is married to Aghie Veronicca and they have two children named Fabio and Fabian Sinaga. Sinaga has more than eleven tattoos on his body, mostly on his arm and torso. Among his tattoos are the name of his wife and child, Catholic prayers, Virgin Mary and a Christian cross.

== Career statistics ==
=== Club ===
As of match played 21 January 2025

Appearances and goals by club, season and competition
| Club | Season | League | | | Cup | | League Cup | | Continental | | Total | |
| Club | Season | Division | Apps | Goals | Apps | Goals | Apps | Goals | Apps | Goals | Apps | Goals |
|---|---|---|---|---|---|---|---|---|---|---|---|---|
| Persibat Batang | 2007 | Indonesia First Division | 14 | 2 | 0 | 0 | 0 | 0 | 0 | 0 | 14 | 2 |
| Persikab Bandung | 2008–09 | Indonesia Premier Division | 10 | 1 | 0 | 0 | 0 | 0 | 0 | 0 | 10 | 1 |
| Pelita Jaya | 2008–09 | Indonesia Super League | 2 | 0 | 0 | 0 | 0 | 0 | 0 | 0 | 2 | 0 |
| PPSM Magelang | 2009–10 | Indonesia Premier Division | 20 | 5 | 0 | 0 | 0 | 0 | 0 | 0 | 20 | 5 |
| Persiwa Wamena | 2010–11 | Indonesia Super League | 26 | 10 | 0 | 0 | 0 | 0 | 0 | 0 | 26 | 10 |
| Semen Padang | 2011–12 | Indonesian Premier League | 22 | 16 | 11 | 3 | 0 | 0 | 0 | 0 | 33 | 19 |
| Putra Samarinda | 2013 | Indonesia Super League | 18 | 10 | 0 | 0 | 0 | 0 | 0 | 0 | 18 | 10 |
| Persib Bandung | 2014 | Indonesia Super League | 23 | 11 | 0 | 0 | 5 (Note: Indonesian Inter Island Cup) | 2 | 0 | 0 | 28 | 13 |
| Sriwijaya | 2015 | Indonesia Super League | 3 | 1 | 0 | 0 | 0 | 0 | 0 | 0 | 3 | 1 |
| PSM Makassar | 2016 | Indonesia Soccer Championship | 24 | 10 | 0 | 0 | 5 (Note: Indonesia President's Cup) | 1 | 0 | 0 | 29 | 11 |
| PSM Makassar | 2017 | Liga 1 | 27 | 12 | 0 | 0 | 0 | 0 | 0 | 0 | 27 | 12 |
| PSM Makassar | Total | | 51 | 22 | 0 | 0 | 5 | 1 | 0 | 0 | 56 | 23 |
| Kelantan | 2018 | Malaysia Super League | 5 | 0 | 1 | 0 | 0 | 0 | 0 | 0 | 6 | 0 |
| PSM Makassar | 2018 | Liga 1 | 30 | 10 | 0 | 0 | 1 | 0 | 0 | 0 | 31 | 10 |
| PSM Makassar | 2019 | Liga 1 | 29 | 9 | 4 (Note: Piala Indonesia) | 3 | 0 | 0 | 3 (Note: AFC Cup) | 1 | 36 | 13 |
| PSM Makassar | 2020 | Liga 1 | 3 | 1 | 0 | 0 | 0 | 0 | 5 | 6 | 8 | 7 |
| PSM Makassar | Total | | 62 | 20 | 4 | 3 | 1 | 0 | 8 | 7 | 75 | 30 |
| PSMS Medan | 2020 | Liga 2 | 0 | 0 | 0 | 0 | 0 | 0 | 0 | 0 | 0 | 0 |
| Persib Bandung | 2021–22 | Liga 1 | 0 | 0 | 0 | 0 | 7 (Note: Menpora Cup) | 2 | 0 | 0 | 7 | 2 |
| Persis Solo | 2021 | Liga 2 | 14 | 3 | 0 | 0 | 0 | 0 | 0 | 0 | 14 | 3 |
| Persis Solo | 2022–23 | Liga 1 | 27 | 2 | 0 | 0 | 0 | 0 | 0 | 0 | 27 | 2 |
| Persis Solo | Total | | 41 | 5 | 0 | 0 | 0 | 0 | 0 | 0 | 41 | 5 |
| PSM Makassar (loan) | 2021–22 | Liga 1 | 13 | 1 | 0 | 0 | 0 | 0 | 0 | 0 | 13 | 1 |
| Persebaya Surabaya | 2023–24 | Liga 1 | 5 | 0 | 0 | 0 | 0 | 0 | 0 | 0 | 5 | 0 |
| Persiraja Banda Aceh (loan) | 2023–24 | Liga 2 | 13 | 5 | 0 | 0 | 0 | 0 | 0 | 0 | 13 | 5 |
| Persekat Tegal | 2024–25 | Liga 2 | 7 | 3 | 0 | 0 | 0 | 0 | 0 | 0 | 7 | 3 |
| Persiba Balikpapan | 2024–25 | Liga Nusantara | 8 | 2 | 0 | 0 | 0 | 0 | 0 | 0 | 8 | 2 |
| Persibat Batang | 2025–26 | Liga 4 | 0 | 0 | 0 | 0 | 0 | 0 | 0 | 0 | 0 | 0 |
| Career Total | | | 342 | 115 | 16 | 6 | 18 | 5 | 8 | 7 | 385 | 132 |

=== International ===
As of match played 10 September 2019

Appearances and goals by national team and year
| National team | Year | Apps | Goals |
|---|---|---|---|
| Indonesia | 2011 | 3 | 0 |
| Indonesia | 2012 | 1 | 0 |
| Indonesia | 2013 | 0 | 0 |
| Indonesia | 2014 | 3 | 0 |
| Indonesia | 2015 | 2 | 0 |
| Indonesia | 2016 | 10 | 0 |
| Indonesia | 2017 | 0 | 0 |
| Indonesia | 2018 | 0 | 0 |
| Indonesia | 2019 | 1 | 0 |
| Total | | 20 | 0 |

==== Indonesia U-23 ====
International goals by date, venue, opponent, score, result and competition
| No. | Date | Venue | Opponent | Score | Result | Competition |
|---|---|---|---|---|---|---|
| 1 | 25 October 2011 | Gelora Bung Karno Stadium, Jakarta, Indonesia | Timor-Leste | 2–0 | 5–0 | Friendly |
| 2 | 13 November 2011 | Gelora Bung Karno Stadium, Jakarta, Indonesia | Thailand | 3–1 | 3–1 | 2011 Southeast Asian Games |
| 3 | 15 September 2014 | Goyang Stadium, Goyang, South Korea | Timor-Leste | 1–0 | 7–0 | 2014 Asian Games |
| 4 | 15 September 2014 | Goyang Stadium, Goyang, South Korea | Timor-Leste | 2–0 | 7–0 | 2014 Asian Games |
| 5 | 15 September 2014 | Goyang Stadium, Goyang, South Korea | Timor-Leste | 3–0 | 7–0 | 2014 Asian Games |
| 6 | 15 September 2014 | Goyang Stadium, Goyang, South Korea | Timor-Leste | 6–0 | 7–0 | 2014 Asian Games |
| 7 | 18 September 2014 | Incheon Football Stadium, Incheon, South Korea | Maldives | 2–0 | 4–0 | 2014 Asian Games |
| 8 | 18 September 2014 | Incheon Football Stadium, Incheon, South Korea | Maldives | 4–0 | 4–0 | 2014 Asian Games |

== Honours ==
=== Club ===
Pelita Jaya U-21

- Indonesia Super League U-21: 2008-09

Semen Padang

- Indonesia Premier League: 2011–12

Persib Bandung

- Indonesia Super League: 2014

PSM Makassar

- Piala Indonesia: 2018–19

Persis Solo

- Liga 2: 2021

Persiba Balikpapan

- Liga Nusantara Promotion play-off: 2024–25

=== International ===
Indonesia U-23

- Southeast Asian Games (silver) Silver medal: 2011

Indonesia

- AFF Championship runner-up: 2016

=== Individual ===
- Indonesian Premier League Top Goalscorer: 2011–12
- Asian Games Top Goalscorer: 2014 (6 goals)
- Indonesia Super League Best Player: 2014
