= Cẩm Phả Stadium =

Stadium in Vietnam

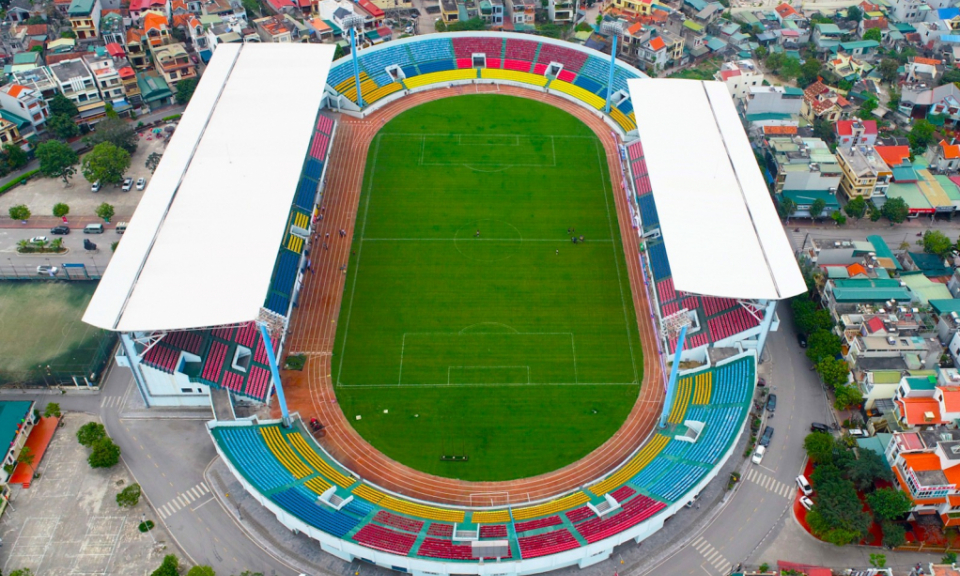
- Cẩm Phả Stadium in 2022
- Interactive map of Cẩm Phả Stadium
- Location: Bái Tử Long Street, Cẩm Trung Ward, Cẩm Phả, Quảng Ninh Province
- Coordinates: 21°00′24″N 107°16′32″E
- Owner: Quảng Ninh Province
- Capacity: 20,000
- Surface: Grass

Construction
- Renovated: 2010-2011; 2018-2020

Tenants
- Than Quảng Ninh (until 2021); Vietnam women's national football team (selected matches); Quảng Ninh FC (2025–present)

Cẩm Phả Stadium (Vietnamese: Sân vận động Cẩm Phả) is a multi-use stadium located in Vo Huy Tam Street, Cẩm Phả Ward, Quảng Ninh City, Vietnam. The stadium has a capacity of 20,000 seats and mostly used for football matches. It is the best quality stadium in Quảng Ninh Province and was the home stadium of Than Quảng Ninh before the club dissolved in August 2021.

== History ==
The stadium was renovated and upgraded in 2010 which cost 37 billion Vietnamese Dong (around 1.7 million US Dollar). This include renovating and upgrading the A, B, C, D stands, the press and TV broadcast room at B stand. The stadium was also installed with new lighting system that meet national standard, electronic score board, outdoor track, and other improvements on the stadium campus and parking lot.

The stadium's lighting system was upgraded in 2014 after Than Quảng Ninh F.C. was banned by VPF( Vietnam Professional Football Joint Stock Company) to play their home match at this stadium because the stadium's lighting system doesn't meet the standard requirement, VPF later withdrew the decision as Quảng Ninh Province committed to upgrade the lighting system after 2014 Lunar New Year.

Between 2018 and 2020, Cẩm Phả Stadium went through another renovation; 163 billion VND (US$7.1 million) was allocated to the project by the provincial government. Additional sections to all spectators' stands were constructed, boosting the stadium's capacity from 8,762 to 16,000 seats. On March 11, 2020, the stadium hosted the first match after the new upgrade, in which it welcomed Vietnam and Australia women's teams for the last leg of 2020 AFC Women's Olympic Qualifying Tournament's Play-off round. The match suffered from a 15-minute power failure during the game. Ultimately, Vietnam lost to Australia 1–2.
