= 2014–15 Oman Professional League =

Oman Professional League
- Season: 2014–15
- Champions: Al-Oruba
- Relegated: Bowsher; Al-Seeb
- Matches: 182
- Goals: 479 (2.63 per match)
- Top goalscorer: (Ivory Coast) Mechac Koffi (19 goals)
- Biggest home win: Saham 5–0 Al-Suwaiq (18 September 2014)
- Biggest away win: Al-Suwaiq 0–4 Al-Oruba (25 September 2014); Al-Suwaiq 0–4 Al-Nasr (29 October 2014); Bowsher 0–4 Sur (8 February 2015); Bowsher 1–5 Dhofar (17 May 2015)
- Highest scoring: Saham 3–4 Dhofar (29 October 2014)
- Longest winning run: (5 games); Sur; Fanja
- Longest unbeaten run: (10 games); Al-Oruba
- Longest losing run: (7 games); Al-Nahda
- All statistics correct as of 28 May 2015.

The 2014–15 Oman Professional League (known as the Omantel Professional League for sponsorship reasons) was the 39th edition of the top football league in Oman. The season began on 11 September 2014, and concluded on 28 May 2015. Al-Nahda Club were the defending champions, having won their third title in the 2013–14 season. On 9 May 2015, Al-Oruba SC were crowned the champions of the 2014–15 Oman Professional League with three games to spare after Sur SC was held to a 2–2 draw by Al-Suwaiq Club at the Al-Seeb Stadium. Al-Oruba who had beaten Sohar SC, 1–0 on Friday took their tally to 48 points from 23 matches, gaining an unassailable lead of eight points ahead of second-placed Sur. Sur, which needed to win on Saturday to keep their title hopes alive, and settled for one point to take its tally to 40 points, helping the fierce rivals from Sur city to win their 4th domestic title.

== Teams ==
This season the league has 14 teams. Majees SC and Al-Ittihad Club were relegated to the First Division League after finishing in the relegation zone in the 2013–14 season. Al-Nasr S.C.S.C. however again managed to play in the top division as they won the Relegation/Promotion playoff against Al-Mudhaibi Club. The two relegated teams were replaced by First Division League winners Al-Khabourah SC, runners-up Bowsher Club.

The winner and the runner-up will qualify for the 2016 AFC Cup.

=== Stadiums and locations ===
Locations of teams in the 2014–15 Omani League

Note: Table lists clubs in alphabetical order.

Club	Home city	Stadium	Capacity
Al-Khabourah SC	Al-Khaburah	Nizwa Sports Complex	10,000
Al-Musannah SC	Al-Musannah	Al-Seeb Stadium	14,000
Al-Nahda	Al-Buraimi	Al-Buraimi Sports Complex	10,000
Al-Nasr S.C.S.C.	Salalah	Al-Saada Stadium / Salalah Sports Complex	12,000
Al-Oruba SC	Sur	Sur Sports Complex	8,000
Al-Seeb Club	Al-Seeb	Al-Seeb Stadium	14,000
Al-Shabab Club	Barka	Al-Seeb Stadium	14,000
Al-Suwaiq Club	Al-Suwaiq	Al-Seeb Stadium	14,000
Bowsher Club	Bowsher	Sultan Qaboos Sports Complex / Royal Oman Police Stadium	39,000
Dhofar S.C.S.C.	Salalah	Al-Saada Stadium / Salalah Sports Complex	12,000
Fanja SC	Fanja	Sultan Qaboos Sports Complex / Royal Oman Police Stadium	39,000
Saham SC	Saham	Sohar Regional Sports Complex	19,000
Sohar SC	Sohar	Sohar Regional Sports Complex	19,000
Sur SC	Sur	Sur Sports Complex	8,000

=== Personnel and kits ===
Note: Flags indicate national team as has been defined under FIFA eligibility rules. Players may hold more than one non-FIFA nationality.

Team	Head coach	Captain	Kit manufacturer	Shirt sponsor
Al-Khabourah	(Egypt) Sherif El-Khashab	(Oman) Hassan Khadoom Al-Hosni	Kelme	
Al-Musannah	(Oman) Musabah Al-Saadi	(Oman) Abdullah Al-Hindasi	Adidas	
Al-Nahda	(Portugal) Bernardo Tavares	(Oman) Arif Al-Balushi	Kelme	Al-Buraimi University College
Al-Nasr	(Croatia) Edo Flego	(Senegal) Mouhamed Ablaye Gaye	Kelme	Shanfari Marble
Al-Oruba	(France) Philippe Burle	(Oman) Hassan Mudhafar Al-Gheilani	Uhlsport	
Al-Seeb	(Syria) Emad Dahbour	(Oman) Abdullah Al-Shuain Al-Saadi	Adidas	
Al-Shabab	(Oman) Waleed Zaid Al-Saadi	(Oman) Jaber Al-Owaisi	Kelme	
Al-Suwaiq	(Morocco) Abderrazak Khairi	(Oman) Yousuf Abdullah Al-Saadi	Uhlsport	Fatik
Bowsher	(Serbia) Željko Markov	(Tunisia) Amin Al-Majri	Nike	
Dhofar	(Romania) Grigore Sichitiu	(Oman) Nabil Ashoor	Nike	Oasis Grace L.L.C.
Fanja	(Oman) Abdulraheem Al-Hajri	(Oman) Ahmed Hadid Al-Mukhaini	Uhlsport	
Saham	(Serbia) Branko Smiljanić	(Oman) Yaqoob Al-Qasmi	Uhlsport	
Sohar	(Iraq) Thair Adnan	(Jordan) Ahmed Abu Halawa	Kelme	
Sur	(Morocco) Youssef Al-Rafaly	(Syria) Belal Abduldaim	Adidas	

=== Managerial changes ===
Club	Outgoing manager	Manner of departure	Date of vacancy	Incoming manager	Date of appointment
Al-Musannah	(Bosnia and Herzegovina) Dženis Ćosić	Resigned	7 February 2015	(Oman) Musabah Al-Saadi	8 February 2015
Al-Nahda	(Oman) Mohsin Al-Balushi	Resigned	15 February 2015	(Portugal) Bernardo Tavares	15 February 2015
Al-Nasr	(Croatia) Marinko Koljanin	Sacked	13 March 2015	(Croatia) Edo Flego	13 March 2015
Al-Oruba	(Bosnia and Herzegovina) Senad Kreso	Sacked	5 September 2014	(Oman) Fahad Al-Araimi	5 September 2014
Al-Oruba	(Oman) Fahad Al-Araimi	Resigned	5 October 2014	(France) Philippe Burle	8 October 2014
Al-Seeb	(Czech Republic) Jaroslav Horak	Sacked	29 September 2014	(Oman) Ali Al-Khanbashi	29 September 2014
Al-Seeb	(Oman) Ali Al-Khanbashi	Caretaker role finished	2 December 2014	(Syria) Emad Dahbour	2 December 2014
Al-Shabab	(Oman) Mubarak Al-Gheilani	Sacked	9 April 2015	(Oman) Waleed Zaid Al-Saadi	9 April 2015
Al-Suwaiq	(Oman) Musabah Al-Saadi	Sacked	20 November 2014	(Morocco) Abderrazak Khairi	25 November 2014
Bowsher	(Iraq) Thair Adnan	Sacked	6 December 2014	(Oman) Jamal Nabi Al-Balushi	6 December 2014
Bowsher	(Oman) Jamal Nabi Al-Balushi	Caretaker role finished	10 January 2015	(Serbia) Željko Markov	10 January 2015
Dhofar	(Romania) Petre Gigiu	Sacked	30 December 2014	(Romania) Grigore Sichitiu	30 December 2014
Fanja	(Italy) Guglielmo Arena	Mutual Consent	31 December 2014	(Serbia) Slobodan Pavković	11 January 2015
Fanja	(Serbia) Slobodan Pavković	Resigned	7 March 2015	(Oman) Abdulraheem Al-Hajri	7 March 2015
Saham	(Syria) Immad Eddine Khankan	Mutual Consent	6 October 2014	(Oman) Yaqoob Ismail	6 October 2014
Saham	(Oman) Yaqoob Ismail	Caretaker role finished	21 November 2014	(Serbia) Branko Smiljanić	21 November 2014
Sohar	(Jordan) Adnan Al-Shuaibat	Sacked	4 October 2014	(Oman) Ibrahim Al-Balushi	4 October 2014
Sohar	(Oman) Ibrahim Al-Balushi	Resigned	23 April 2015	(Iraq) Thair Adnan	27 April 2015
Sur	(Bosnia and Herzegovina) Zijad Švrakić	Sacked	5 February 2015	(Morocco) Youssef Al-Rafaly	5 February 2015

=== Foreign players ===
Restricting the number of foreign players strictly to four per team, including a slot for a player from AFC countries. A team could use four foreign players on the field during each game including at least one player from the AFC country.

Club	Player 1	Player 2	Player 3	AFC player	Former players
Al-Khabourah	(Egypt) Ahmed Salama	TBD	(Syria) Samer Salem	(Syria) Nasouh Al Nakdali	
Al-Musannah	(Brazil) David da Silva	(Brazil) Jarlisson Pereira	(Brazil) Igor Carneiro Luiz	(Syria) Mahmoud Al-Youssef	(Egypt) Mohammed El-Shazly
Al-Nahda	(Nigeria) Daniel Odafin	(Mauritania) Ely Cheikh Voulany	(Tunisia) Montassar Lahfidhi	(Jordan) Ahmed Hatamleh	(Cameroon) Moustapha Moctar Belbi
Al-Nasr	(Senegal) Mouhamed Ablaye Gaye	(Ivory Coast) Mechac Koffi	(Kenya) Jamal Mohammed	(Lebanon) Hamza Salameh	(Serbia) Đorđe Vukobrat (Syria) Abdulkader Mjarmesh
Al-Oruba	(Spain) Ángel Carrascosa Muñoz	(Nigeria) Hammed Adesope			(South Sudan) (United States) Francis Johar Khamis (Brazil) Gustavo dos Santos Correia (Brazil) (Portugal) Leonardo de Miranda Pires (Syria) Samer Salem (Brazil) (Timor-Leste) Pedro Henrique Oliveira (Brazil) Guilherme Morano
Al-Seeb	(Tanzania) Juma Mpongo	TBD	(Syria) Mohannad Ibrahim	(Syria) Khaled Al-Brijawi	(Syria) Ahmad Haj Mohamad (Croatia) Srdjan Vidakovic
Al-Shabab	(Brazil) Lucas Gaúcho	(Brazil) Douglas Silveira	(Brazil) Kléber dos Santos Silva	(Syria) Amro Jenyat	(Brazil) Marcelo Pereira Silva (Syria) Rabea Mohammed Abdullah
Al-Suwaiq	(Ivory Coast) Abdoulaye Koffi	(Mali) Aboubacar Magassa	(Morocco) Youssef El Basri	(Yemen) Mohammed Ebrahim Ayash	
Bowsher	(Tunisia) Amin Al-Majri	(Nigeria) Stephen Worgu	TBD	(Ghana) (Kyrgyzstan) Elijah Ari	(Morocco) Miloud Ennakhli (Morocco) Moghny Reda
Dhofar	(Brazil) Fernando Lopes Alcântara	(Nigeria) Felix Ogbuke	(Ivory Coast) Blaise Kouassi	(Syria) Mosab Balhous	(Brazil) Washington Assis (Brazil) Igor Carneiro Luiz
Fanja	(Nigeria) Ike Thankgod	(Senegal) Ibrahima Ndione	(Morocco) Bilal Danguir	TBD	(France) Maxime Belouet (Syria) Mardik Mardikian
Saham	(Brazil) Vinícius da Silva Salles	TBD	TBD	(Lebanon) Ziad Al-Samad	(Ivory Coast) Abdoulaye Koffi (Bosnia and Herzegovina) Delimir Bajić (Brazil) (Italy) Vítor Huvos
Sohar	(Brazil) António José Da Silveira Júnior	(Brazil) Roberto de Jesus Metzker	(Ghana) Courage Pekuson	(Jordan) Ahmed Abu Halawa	(Morocco) Tarik El Janaby (Syria) Mohamad Fares (Syria) Mahmoud Al-Youssef
Sur	(Brazil) Tiago Chulapa	(Syria) Belal Abduldaim	(Syria) Ahmad Omaier	(Syria) Adel Abdullah	

== League table ==
Pos	Team	Pld	W	D	L	GF	GA	GD	Pts	Qualification or relegation
1	Al-Oruba (C)	26	15	4	7	33	23	+10	49	2016 AFC Cup group stage
2	Fanja	26	14	5	7	41	33	+8	47	2016 AFC Cup group stage
3	Sur	26	13	7	6	37	26	+11	46	2016 GCC Champions League group stage
4	Al-Nasr	26	11	8	7	45	30	+15	41	2016 GCC Champions League group stage
5	Dhofar	26	9	11	6	41	32	+9	38 (Note: On 11 December 2014, defending champions Al-Nahda failed to turn up against Dhofar in an OPL match at the Al-Saada Stadium in Salalah; the Oman Professional League's Disciplinary Committee handed the result of the abandoned match in favour of Dhofar (3-0) and docked Al-Nahda a total of nine points - three for skipping the 11 December fixture and six more as penalty. However, on 21 May 2015, OFA's Court of Arbitration announced the verdict to reinstate Al-Nahda's six points that were docked after it pulled out of the OPL match against Dhofar and also announced that a rematch must be played between the two teams on 28 May 2015 at the Al-Saada Stadium in Salalah.) (Note: On 20 May 2015, Dhofar's club management, showing a friendly and supportive nature, requested the Oman Football Association to shift their last home game of the season against Al-Seeb from Al-Saada Stadium in Salalah to Muscat Club's home ground in Muscat so that Al-Seeb team gets adequate time to prepare themselves for the finals of the 2015 GCC Champions League and thus consequently the date of the fixture was changed from 25 May 2015 to 24 May 2015.)	
6	Al-Khabourah	26	10	7	9	34	31	+3	37	
7	Al-Nahda	26	10	6	10	39	35	+4	36	
8	Al-Musannah	26	8	9	9	40	36	+4	33	
9	Saham	26	9	5	12	36	35	+1	32	
10	Al-Shabab	26	8	8	10	34	38	−4	32	
11	Al-Suwaiq	26	8	7	11	29	41	−12	31	
12	Sohar	26	6	13	7	25	30	−5	31	Relegation Playoff
13	Bowsher (R)	26	4	9	13	23	47	−24	21	Relegation to 2015–16 Oman First Division League
14	Al-Seeb (R)	26	3	9	14	22	42	−20	18	Relegation to 2015–16 Oman First Division League

Updated to match(es) played on 28 May 2015. Source: League Table
Rules for classification: 1) points; 2) goal difference; 3) number of goals scored.
(C) Champions; (R) Relegated

== Results ==
Home \ Away	ALK	ALM	ALNH	ALN	ALO	ALS	ALSH	ALSU	BOW	DHO	FAN	SAH	SOH	SUR
Al-Khabourah		3–0	2–1	1–3	0–1	2–1	2–0	1–1	1–1	1–1	1–3	1–0	0–1	0–1
Al-Musannah	2–3		2–2	1–1	2–1	4–0	1–2	2–3	4–1	1–1	2–3	1–2	3–1	1–1
Al-Nahda	0–3	1–1		1–3	0–0	3–1	2–0	5–0	4–0	1–1	1–1	2–1	1–2	0–2
Al-Nasr	1–1	2–2	2–1		1–2	0–1	2–1	0–0	4–0	2–3	0–1	2–1	0–0	1–2
Al-Oruba	1–0	1–0	1–2	1–0		3–0	1–0	1–2	2–0	2–0	1–4	2–1	1–0	2–3
Al-Seeb	2–3	1–1	1–0	1–1	1–2		0–1	1–4	0–0	1–1	1–2	0–1	0–0	1–2
Al-Shabab	2–0	1–1	3–1	1–2	2–0	1–1		0–2	2–2	1–2	3–1	1–3	1–1	1–1
Al-Suwaiq	2–2	1–2	0–1	0–4	0–4	1–2	1–2		1–3	0–3	0–1	0–0	3–0	2–2
Bowsher	1–2	0–1	2–1	2–2	1–1	2–2	1–1	0–1		1–5	0–1	1–0	1–1	0–4
Dhofar	1–1	1–1	2–3	0–3	1–1	0–0	0–1	0–1	2–2		2–2	2–3	2–1	4–0
Fanja	1–2	2–1	2–1	2–4	0–1	3–2	0–0	3–1	2–0	0–2		2–1	3–0	1–1
Saham	1–1	0–2	2–3	3–2	3–0	2–0	3–2	0–0	1–2	3–4	3–1		1–1	0–1
Sohar	1–0	2–1	0–0	1–1	0–0	1–1	4–4	2–2	1–0	0–1	2–0	1–1		1–1
Sur	2–1	0–1	1–2	1–2	0–1	2–1	4–1	0–1	1–0	0–0	1–1	2–0	2–1	

Updated to match(es) played on 28 May 2015. Source: Results
Legend: Blue = home team win; Yellow = draw; Red = away team win.

== Clubs season-progress ==
Team ╲ Round	1	2	3	4	5	6	7	8	9	10	11	12	13	14	15	16	17	18	19	20	21	22	23	24	25	26
Al-Khabourah	D	L	L	W	W	D	W	L	W	W	W	D	L	D	L	W	D	W	D	W	L	D	W	L	L	L
Al-Musannah	D	L	W	D	L	D	W	D	D	D	L	L	W	D	W	W	W	L	D	L	D	W	L	W	L	L
Al-Nahda	D	W	L	W	W	L	L	L	L	W	L	L	W	D	W	D	D	L	W	L	L	D	W	W	D	W
Al-Nasr	D	L	W	W	L	D	W	W	L	W	D	D	W	D	W	L	W	W	D	D	W	L	D	L	W	L
Al-Oruba	L	W	W	L	W	D	W	W	W	D	W	W	W	W	L	L	D	L	W	W	W	W	W	D	L	L
Al-Seeb	L	L	L	D	W	W	L	D	L	L	D	D	D	L	D	L	L	L	L	L	D	L	L	W	D	D
Al-Shabab	D	W	W	L	D	W	D	W	L	D	W	W	L	D	D	L	L	D	L	L	D	L	W	L	L	W
Al-Suwaiq	L	L	L	W	L	D	L	D	L	W	L	D	L	L	L	W	L	W	D	D	W	W	D	W	D	W
Bowsher	D	W	L	L	L	D	L	D	L	L	D	D	L	D	W	L	W	W	L	L	D	D	D	L	L	L
Dhofar	D	W	W	D	D	L	W	D	W	L	L	D	D	D	L	W	W	W	W	L	D	L	D	W	D	D
Fanja	W	W	W	D	L	D	W	L	W	L	L	W	L	W	L	D	L	W	D	W	D	W	W	W	W	W
Saham	W	L	W	L	W	D	L	L	W	W	W	D	L	W	L	W	D	L	D	W	L	W	L	L	D	L
Sohar	D	L	L	D	D	D	L	D	W	D	D	D	W	D	W	L	L	D	D	W	L	D	L	W	D	W
Sur	W	W	L	D	D	D	D	W	D	L	W	L	W	W	W	W	W	L	D	W	W	L	L	D	W	W

Updated to match(es) played on 28 May 2015. Source: Clubs Season-Progress
W = Win; D = Draw; L = Lose

== Promotion/relegation play-off ==
As of 31 May 2015

=== 1st leg ===
28 May 2015
20:15 UTC+4

Al-Rustaq	0 - 1	Sohar
		Al-Fazari 80'

Sultan Qaboos Sports Complex, Muscat, Oman

=== 2nd leg ===
31 May 2013
19:30 UTC+4

Sohar	1 - 1	Al-Rustaq
Al-Shaqsi 13'		Al-Shibli 17'

Sohar Regional Sports Complex, Sohar, Oman

Sohar secured promotion after winning 2–1 on aggregate

== Season statistics ==
As of 29 May 2015

=== Top scorers ===
Rank	Scorer	Club	Goals
1	(Ivory Coast) Mechac Koffi	Al-Nasr	19
2	(Ivory Coast) Abdoulaye Koffi ^{*}	Al-Suwaiq	14
3	(Oman) Abdul Rahman Al-Ghassani	Fanja	13
4	(Brazil) Lucas Gaúcho	Al-Shabab	12
5	(Brazil) Jarlisson Pereira	Al-Musannah	11
6	(Oman) Said Obaid Al-Abdul Salam	Al-Khabourah	10
6	(Oman) Mohsin Al-Khaldi	Saham	10
6	(Oman) Said Al-Dhabouni	Al-Musannah	10
7	(Mauritania) Ely Cheikh Voulany	Al-Nahda	9
8	(Oman) Abdulaziz Al-Muqbali	Fanja	8
8	(Senegal) Mouhamed Ablaye Gaye	Al-Nasr	8
8	(Oman) Hussain Al-Hadhri	Dhofar	8
8	(Oman) Mohammed Al-Ghassani	Al-Shabab	8
8	(Brazil) Igor Carneiro Luiz ^{**}	Al-Musannah	8

^{*} Player scored 2 goals for Saham SC
^{**} Player scored 2 goals for Dhofar S.C.S.C.

=== Top Omani scorers ===
Rank	Scorer	Club	Goals
1	(Oman) Abdul Rahman Al-Ghassani	Fanja	13
2	(Oman) Said Obaid Al-Abdul Salam	Al-Khabourah	10
2	(Oman) Mohsin Al-Khaldi	Saham	10
2	(Oman) Said Al-Dhabouni	Al-Musannah	10
3	(Oman) Abdulaziz Al-Muqbali	Fanja	8
3	(Oman) Hussain Al-Hadhri	Dhofar	8
3	(Oman) Mohammed Al-Ghassani	Al-Shabab	8
4	(Oman) Hamoud Al-Saadi	Dhofar	7
5	(Oman) Said Al-Ruzaiqi	Al-Nahda	6
5	(Oman) Mohammed Taqi Al-Lawati	Bowsher	6
5	(Oman) Ahmed Mubarak Al-Mahaijri	Al-Oruba	6
5	(Oman) Mohammed Al-Shamsi	Al-Nahda	6
5	(Oman) Khalid Al-Hamdani	Al-Seeb	6
5	(Oman) Ishad Obaid Al-Abdul Salam	Al-Khabourah	6

=== Hat-tricks ===
Player	Club	Against	Result	Date
(Oman) Abdulaziz Al-Muqbali	Fanja	Sohar	3—0	18 September 2014
(Oman) Hamoud Al-Saadi	Dhofar	Saham	4—3	29 October 2014
(Brazil) Lucas Gaúcho	Al-Shabab	Fanja	3—1	28 November 2014
(Oman) Abdulaziz Al-Muqbali	Fanja	Al-Seeb	3—2	5 December 2014
(Ivory Coast) Mechac Koffi	Al-Nasr	Fanja	4—2	8 January 2015
(Ivory Coast) Abdoulaye Koffi	Al-Suwaiq	Al-Seeb	4—1	15 April 2015

== OFA Awards ==
Oman Football Association awarded the following awards for the 2014–15 Oman Professional League season.

- Top Scorer: Mechac Koffi (Al-Nasr)
- Best Player: Eid Al-Farsi (Al-Oruba)
- Most Promising Young Player: Mohammed Al-Najashi (Sur)
- Best Goalkeeper: Riyadh Al-Alawi (Al-Oruba)
- Best Coach: Philippe Burle (Al-Oruba)
- Best Team Manager: Hussain Mustahil (Al-Nasr)
- Fair Play Award: Al-Suwaiq

== Media coverage ==
Oman Professional League media coverage
Country	Television channel	Matches
Oman	Oman Sports TV	4 matches per round

== Controversies ==
The league was the subject of controversies like the refusal of Omani referees to officiate in the league matches and boycott of the Professional League by clubs.

Before the beginning of the 2014–15 season, nine top clubs of the Oman Professional League demanded the cancellation of the Professional League. It was reported that the presidents of the nine clubs (Al-Oruba, Dhofar, Al-Seeb, Al-Nahda, Fanja, Bowsher, Sohar, Al-Shabab and Sur) held a meeting in the head office of Sur SC on 7 June 2014 in order to discuss the experience of different clubs of the professional league. The statement released by the clubs after this meeting sparked a wave of controversy as all these nine clubs decided to hold a meeting with Sayyid Khalid Al-Busaidi, Chairman of the Oman Football Association and demand the cancellation of the 2014–15 season of the Oman Professional League. The reason given out was that the clubs were unable to meet the financial demands laid out by the association and also that the association failed to fulfill the promises made before the beginning of the pro-league system.

In a major embarrassment for the Oman Football Association (OFA), all its top-division referees boycotted the three-day opening round of the prestigious Omantel Professional League (OPL), which began on 11 September 2014, over a payment issue. This was the first ever instance in Oman of OFA-accredited referees boycotting top-flight domestic league matches over a stand-off. The referees refused to officiate in the opening-round matches on 11 September 2014, 12 September 2014 and 13 September 2014 over long-standing bonus payments from the OFA. The row over pending bonus payments for the referees had been brewing since the conclusion of the inaugural edition of OPL last season. The first round match between Sur SC and Al-Seeb Club was postponed from the scheduled time to another time and the match between Dhofar S.C.S.C. and Al-Khaboora SC which was also scheduled to be held on 11 September was postponed to the next day because of the refusal of Omani referees to officiate in the league matches. The OFA, under the chairmanship of Sayyid Khalid al Busaidy, managed to defuse the crisis by requesting the UAE football body to send match officials to get the OPL started. UAE duly responded, sending 16 officials - eight referees and eight linesmen - who officiated in the seven opening-round matches that went ahead as scheduled from Thursday to Saturday at various venues in Oman.

On 11 December 2014, defending champions Al-Nahda failed to turn up against Dhofar in an OPL match at the Al-Saada Stadium in Salalah; the Oman Professional League's Disciplinary Committee handed the result of the abandoned match in favour of Dhofar (3-0) and docked Al-Nahda a total of nine points - three for skipping the 11 December fixture and six more as penalty.

On 11 February 2015, 4 (Al-Musannah, Al-Seeb, Bowsher and Fanja) out of the 14 clubs participating in the 2014–15 Oman Professional League along with 8 other Omani clubs decided to go ahead with their demand for an Extraordinary General Meeting (EGM) with the aim of introducing a no-confidence motion against the association's board members.

On 7 March 2015, 10 out of 39 clubs attending a consultative meeting of the OFA walked out in protest midway into the proceedings. walkout was triggered by the OFA's decision to call off an Extraordinary General Meeting (EGM), which was originally scheduled for 7 March 2015. However, the OFA which had previously agreed for an EGM, on 6 March 2015 shelved the summit, citing a letter from the FIFA, football's world governing body. On the very next day, the OFA cancelled the membership of 11 clubs (Ahli Sidab, Al-Ittifaq, Al-Kamel Wa Al-Wafi, Al-Musannah, Al-Seeb, Bowsher, Dhofar, Fanja, Ibri, Ja'lan and Nizwa) for illegally withdrawing from the consultative meeting conducted by the OFA.

== See also ==
- 2014–15 Sultan Qaboos Cup
- 2014–15 Oman Professional League Cup
- 2014 Oman Super Cup
- 2014–15 Oman First Division League
- 2015–16 Oman Second Division League
