= Vinicius =

Vinícius is a Portuguese masculine given name and surname from the Roman family name Vinicius, meaning "victorious" derived from the latin 'vinco'. The name is possibly also derived from Latin vinum "wine". Notable people with the name include:

== Given name ==
- Vinícius (footballer, born 1973), full name Vinícius de Abreu, Brazilian football forward
- Vinícius (footballer, born 1985), full name Vinícius Barrivieira, Brazilian football goalkeeper
- Vinícius Bergantin (born 1980), Brazilian footballer known as Vinícius
- Vinícius Cabral, Brazilian para athlete
- Vinicius Cantuária (born 1951), Brazilian musician
- Vinícius (footballer, born 1977), full name Vinícius Conceição da Silva, Brazilian football centre-back
- Yoñlu (1989 – 2006), real name Vinícius Gageiro Marques, Brazilian singer-songwriter
- Vinicius (footballer, born 1998), full name Vinicius Geovane Damasceno de Paula, Brazilian footballer
- Vinícius (Portuguese footballer) (born 1995), real name José Pedro Ferradeira dos Santos, Portuguese footballer
- Vinícius (footballer, born September 1983), full name Vinícius Ferreira Orlando, Brazilian football centre-back
- Vinícius (footballer, born December 1988), full name Vinícius Ferreira de Souza, Brazilian football attacking midfielder
- Vinicius (footballer, born 1989), full name Vinicius Galvão Leal, Brazilian football striker
- Vinícius Garcia (born 1997), Brazilian football midfielder
- Vinícius Goes, (born 1991), Brazilian footballer known as Vinicius
- Vinícius Jaú (born 1998), Brazilian football forward
- Vinícius Júnior (born 2000), Brazilian footballer
- Vinícius (footballer, born 1964), full name Vinícius Lopes Righi, Brazilian footballer
- Vinicius de Moraes (1913 – 1980), Brazilian musician, poet, composer, playwright and diplomat
- Vinícius (footballer, born 1982), full name Carlos Vinicius Neves da Silva, Brazilian football defender
- Vinícius (footballer, born January 1988), full name Vinícius Alberto Nunes, Brazilian football left-back
- Vinícius (footballer, born 1986), full name Vinícius Oliveira Franco, Brazilian footballer
- Vinícius (footballer, born 1993), full name Vinícius Santos Silva, Brazilian football winger
- Vinícius da Silva (born 1982), Brazilian football right-back
- Vinícius (footballer, born June 1983), full name Vinícius Rodrigues Tomaz da Silva Almeida, Brazilian football midfielder

== Surname ==
- Carlos Vinícius (born 1995), Brazilian footballer known as Vinicius
- Lucius Vinicius (consul 33 BC), Roman consul
- Lucius Vinicius (consul 5 BC), Roman consul and son of the earlier consul of the same name
- Marcus Vinicius (consul 19 BC), Roman consul and general and friend of the emperor Augustus
- Marcus Vinicius (consul 30), (c. 5 BC – AD 46) Roman consul in 30 AD and husband of Julia Livilla
- Paulo Vinícius (footballer, born 1990), Hungarian footballer
- Publius Vinicius, Roman consul in 2 AD

== Fictional characters ==
- Vinicius, the mascot of the 2016 Summer Olympics, named after Vinicius de Moraes
- Marcus Vinicius, main character in Quo Vadis, an 1896 Polish novel by Henryk Sienkiewicz, and the fictional son of the Marcus Vinicius in 30 AD

== See also ==
- Vinicius (album), a recording by Vinicius Cantuária
