= 29th GCC Club Cup =

2014 GCC Club Cup
كأس الأندية الخليجية

Tournament details
- Dates: 3 February – 19 May 2014
- Teams: 12 (from AFC/UAFA) confederations)

Final positions
- Champions: (United Arab Emirates) Al-Nasr (1st title)
- Runners-up: (Oman) Saham

The 29th GCC Club Cup (Arabic: كأس الأندية الخليجية) was the 29th edition of the GCC Club Cup for clubs of the Gulf Cooperation Council nations, and the first under its new name.

The 2014 edition is officially known as the Pharmaton 29th GCC Club Cup Championship due to sponsorship reasons.

The competition kicked off on 3 February 2014 making it change to being played in one calendar year which was the usual format until changed for the last edition.

== Groups ==
Four groups of three teams.

Top two from each group qualify for the one legged quarter finals with group winners hosting the matches.

Group A	Group B	Group C	Group D
(Kuwait) Al Jahra (Oman) Saham (Saudi Arabia) Al-Raed	(Bahrain) Al-Muharraq (United Arab Emirates) Al Shabab (Saudi Arabia) Al-Shoalah	(Bahrain) Busaiteen (United Arab Emirates) Al-Nasr (Qatar) Al-Khor	(Oman) Al-Nahda (Kuwait) Al-Nasr (Qatar) Al Kharaitiyat

== Group stage ==
=== Group A ===
Team	Pld	W	D	L	GF	GA	GD	Pts
(Oman) Saham	4	2	2	0	8	6	+2	8
(Kuwait) Al Jahra	4	1	2	1	9	9	0	5
(Saudi Arabia) Al-Raed	4	0	2	2	6	8	−2	2

3 February 2014	Saham (Oman)	1–1	(Kuwait) Al Jahra	Sultan Qaboos Sports Complex, Muscat
15:50	Fayez 48' (o.g.)		Vinícius 65' (pen.)

25 February 2014	Al Jahra (Kuwait)	2–2	(Saudi Arabia) Al-Raed	Abdullah Al-Khalifa Stadium, Kuwait City
17:15

11 March 2014	Al-Raed (Saudi Arabia)	1–1	(Oman) Saham	King Abdullah Sport City Stadium, Buraidah
20:25			Al-Zeno 11'

18 March 2014	Al Jahra (Kuwait)	3–4	(Oman) Saham	Abdullah Al-Khalifa Stadium, Kuwait City
16:30			Brahima 38', 62', 90+2'; Al-Mamari 77'

1 April 2014	Al-Raed (Saudi Arabia)	2–3	(Kuwait) Al Jahra	King Abdullah Sport City Stadium, Buraidah
19:30

15 April 2014	Saham (Oman)	2–1	(Saudi Arabia) Al-Raed	Sultan Qaboos Sports Complex, Muscat
	Vinícius 28'; Al-Mamari 65'

=== Group B ===
Team	Pld	W	D	L	GF	GA	GD	Pts
(United Arab Emirates) Al Shabab	4	2	1	1	4	3	+1	7
(Bahrain) Al-Muharraq	4	2	1	1	4	3	+1	7
(Saudi Arabia) Al-Shoalah	4	0	2	2	2	4	−2	2

4 February 2014	Al-Muharraq (Bahrain)	1–0	(Saudi Arabia) Al-Shoalah	Khalifa Sports City Stadium, Isa Town
15:00	Awdee 25' (o.g.)

25 February 2014	Al-Shoalah (Saudi Arabia)	1–1	(United Arab Emirates) Al Shabab	Al-Shoalah Club Stadium, Al Kharj
19:20	Al-Gizani 52'		Mustafa 90+1' (o.g.)

12 March 2014	Al Shabab (United Arab Emirates)	0–1	(Bahrain) Al-Muharraq	Maktoum bin Rashid Stadium, Dubai
14:40

18 March 2014	Al-Shoalah (Saudi Arabia)	1–1	(Bahrain) Al-Muharraq	Al-Shoalah Club Stadium, Al Kharj
18:25

1 April 2014	Al Shabab (United Arab Emirates)	1–0	(Saudi Arabia) Al-Shoalah	Maktoum bin Rashid Stadium, Dubai
15:50

15 April 2014	Al-Muharraq (Bahrain)	1–2	(United Arab Emirates) Al Shabab	Maktoum bin Rashid Stadium, Dubai

=== Group C ===
Team	Pld	W	D	L	GF	GA	GD	Pts
(United Arab Emirates) Al-Nasr	4	2	2	0	8	2	+6	8
(Bahrain) Busaiteen	4	2	1	1	5	2	+3	7
(Qatar) Al-Khor	4	0	1	3	3	12	−9	1

4 February 2014	Al-Khor (Qatar)	1–4	(Bahrain) Busaiteen	Al-Khwar Stadium, Al-Khor
15:00	Awal 48'		Karimi 29'; Kamara 40'; Al Marzooqi 74'; Al Husaini 88'

25 February 2014	Al-Nasr (United Arab Emirates)	5–0	(Qatar) Al-Khor	Maktoum Bin Rashid Al Maktoum Stadium, Dubai
17:00	Holman 13', 21'; Khamees 70'; Lima 81'; Al Fardan 90+1'

11 March 2014	Busaiteen (Bahrain)	0–1	(United Arab Emirates) Al-Nasr	Manama
18:35			Mohamed 52'

19 March 2014	Busaiteen (Bahrain)	1–0	(Qatar) Al-Khor	Manama
18:35

1 April 2014	Al-Khor (Qatar)	2–2	(United Arab Emirates) Al-Nasr	Al-Khwar Stadium, Al-Khor
17:30

15 April 2014	Al-Nasr (United Arab Emirates)	0–0	(Bahrain) Busaiteen	Maktoum Bin Rashid Al Maktoum Stadium, Dubai

=== Group D ===
Team	Pld	W	D	L	GF	GA	GD	Pts
(Oman) Al-Nahda	4	2	2	0	9	3	+6	8
(Qatar) Al Kharaitiyat	4	1	2	1	10	9	+1	5
(Kuwait) Al-Nasr	4	0	2	2	6	13	−7	2

3 February 2014	Al-Nasr (Kuwait)	1–1	(Oman) Al-Nahda	Ali Sabah Al-Salem Stadium, Al Farwaniyah
15:00	Al Rashidi 87'		Al-Shimli 10'

26 February 2014	Al Kharaitiyat (Qatar)	4–4	(Kuwait) Al-Nasr	Al-Khwar Stadium, Al Khor
17:00	Jaycee John 18'; Domingos 45+1'; Kébé 58' (pen.); Al Subaih 90+4'		Pascal 3', 69'; Bani 32'; Al-Ajmi 51' (pen.)

12 March 2014	Al-Nahda (Oman)	2–0	(Qatar) Al Kharaitiyat	Sultan Qaboos Sports Complex, Muscat
17:45	Juma 13'; Ablaye Gaye 18'

18 March 2014	Al-Nahda (Oman)	4–0	(Kuwait) Al-Nasr	Sultan Qaboos Sports Complex, Muscat
15:45	Al-Farsi 23'; Imtiyaz 76'; Juma 82'; Al-Shamsi 89'

2 April 2014	Al-Nasr (Kuwait)	1–1	(Qatar) Al Kharaitiyat	Ali Sabah Al-Salem Stadium, Al Farwaniyah
17:45

16 April 2014	Al Kharaitiyat (Qatar)	2–2	(Oman) Al-Nahda	Al-Khwar Stadium, Al Khor
			Al-Hosni 67'; Al-Noufali 90'

== Quarter-finals ==
- Group winners host a one legged Quarter-final match.

22 April 2014	Saham (Oman)	3–1	(Bahrain) Busaiteen	Sultan Qaboos Sports Complex, Muscat
	Johar 11'; Al-Zeno 51'; Al-Jalabubi 89'

22 April 2014	Al-Nasr (United Arab Emirates)	2–2 (3–1 p)	(Kuwait) Al Jahra	Maktoum Bin Rashid Al Maktoum Stadium, Dubai

23 April 2014	Al Shabab (United Arab Emirates)	4–0	(Qatar) Al Kharaitiyat	Maktoum bin Rashid Stadium, Dubai

23 April 2014	Al-Nahda (Oman)	3–0	(Bahrain) Al-Muharraq	Sultan Qaboos Sports Complex, Muscat
	Juma 18'; Al-Farsi 83'; Ouhakki 90+2'

== Semi-finals ==
The draw for the semi-finals were conducted on 24 April 2014.

=== First leg ===
5 May 2014

Saham (Oman)	3–1	(United Arab Emirates) Al Shabab
Johar 11'; Al-Zeno 51'; Al-Jalabubi 89'

Sultan Qaboos Sports Complex, Muscat
Referee: Abdou Hussain (Qatar)

6 May 2014

Al-Nahda (Oman)	1–1	(United Arab Emirates) Al-Nasr
Al-Hinai 39'

Sultan Qaboos Sports Complex, Muscat
Referee: Al-Awaji (Saudi Arabia)

=== Second leg ===
13 May 2014

Al Shabab (United Arab Emirates)	3–1	(Oman) Saham
		Johar 43'
Penalties
	4–5

Maktoum Bin Rashid Al Maktoum Stadium, Dubai
Referee: Jameel Juma Abdulhusain Mohamed (Bahrain)

Saham advanced on penalties after a 4–4 aggregate draw.

14 May 2014

Al-Nasr (United Arab Emirates)	2–1	(Oman) Al-Nahda
		Rashid 43'

Maktoum Bin Rashid Al Maktoum Stadium, Dubai
Referee: Fahad Al-Marri (Qatar)

Al-Nasr won 3–2 on aggregate.

== Final ==
19 May 2014

Al-Nasr (United Arab Emirates)	2–1	(Oman) Saham
		Johar 79'

Maktoum Bin Rashid Al Maktoum Stadium, Dubai
Referee: Al Mirdasi (Saudi Arabia)
