= Mends =

Mends is a surname. Notable people with the surname include:

- Bright Middleton Mends (born 1992), Ghanaian footballer
- Cecil Duddley Mends (born 1975), Ghanaian Fashion Designer
- Christopher Mends (1724–1799), Welsh Methodist minister
- Esme Mends (born 1986), Ghanaian footballer
- Frank Mends Stone (1857–1942), Australian lawyer and politician
- Kofi Middleton Mends (1939–2016), Ghanaian actor
- Robert Mends (c. 1767–1823), British Royal Navy officer
- T. D. Brodie-Mends (1929–2013), Ghanaian journalist, lawyer and politician
- William Robert Mends (1812–1897), British admiral of the Royal Navy

== See also ==
- Mends Street Jetty, is located in South Perth in Western Australia.
- Nüwa Mends the Heavens, is a well-known theme in Chinese culture
