= Vinícius Lopes =

Vinícius Lopes may refer to:

- Vinícius Lopes Righi (born 1964), known as Vinícius, Brazilian football forward
- Vinícius Lopes (footballer, born 1988), Brazilian football forward
- Vinícius Lopes Laurindo (born 1990), known as Neguete, Brazilian football defender
- Vinícius Lopes (footballer, born 1999), Brazilian football forward
