= O Bem-Amado =

- Genre: Telenovela
- Created by: Dias Gomes
- Starring: Paulo Gracindo; Lima Duarte; Emiliano Queiroz; Ida Gomes; Dorinha Duval; Dirce Migliaccio; Jardel Filho; Sandra Bréa
- Country of origin: Brazil
- Original language: Portuguese
- No. of episodes: 178

Original release
- Network: TV Globo
- Release: 22 January – 3 October 1973

Related
- Sucupira; El Bienamado

O Bem-Amado (English: The Beloved) is a Brazilian telenovela that first aired on Rede Globo in 1973. It is based on a play by Dias Gomes called Odorico, o Bem-Amado ou Os Mistérios do Amor e da Morte, written in 1962. It was the first Brazilian color telenovela. It was shot in Rio de Janeiro.

A notable feature of this telenovela was its music, composed by Vinícius de Moraes and Toquinho.

== Plot ==
Mayor Odorico Paraguaçu is a demagogue and corrupt politician who, with his inflammatory and verbose speeches, deludes the simple people of small Sucupira, on the coast of Bahia. The priority goal of his administration is the inauguration of the local cemetery, criticized by the opposition to his government, led by the Medrado family, who run the local police, the dentist Lulu Gouveia and the journalist Neco Pedreira, editor-in-chief of the newspaper A Trombeta.

Odorico's direct arm in the town hall is his secretary Dirceu Borboleta, a shy, stuttering and clumsy guy who hunts lepidoptera. The mayor's biggest supporters are the sisters Cajazeiras: Dorotéia, Dulcinéia and Judicéia. Old maids and false fools, each of them has a secret affair with Odorico, without one knowing the other, until Dulcinéia gets pregnant and the mayor arranges for the paternity of the baby to fall on the disconnected Dirceu.

Machiavellianly, Odorico plans the death of someone in the town so that his cemetery can be inaugurated. However, he is always unsuccessful. Neither the various suicide attempts by the depressed pharmacist Libório, all of which were thwarted, nor Zelão's desire to fly like a bird (and the expectation that he will crash to the ground), nor a shootout in the square, a crime or a dying man from the neighboring town make his dream come true, until the mayor comes up with the idea of having the famous killer Zeca Diabo brought to Sucupira to commission the job, no matter who the victim is. But Odorico didn't count on the professional killer regretting his criminal past and retiring, caring only about his old mother, his belief in Padre Cícero and his dream of becoming a dental surgeon.

Odorico also faces the idealistic doctor Juarez Leão, who is obstinate in his mission to save lives. Shaken by the trauma of losing his wife in his hands during surgery, the doctor drinks, but does a good job in Sucupira taking care of the people's health, much to the mayor's dismay. Juarez wins the heart of Telma, Odorico's temperamental daughter, who constantly criticizes her father's methods, suspecting that he was responsible for her mother's death.

== Production ==
The main plot of O Bem-Amado is based on a text written in the early 1960s by playwright Dias Gomes, who was inspired by a story told by journalist Nestor de Holanda. According to him, the singer Jorge Goulart, while performing in a town in Espírito Santo, heard from the locals that the mayor had built a cemetery, but was unable to inaugurate it because no one had died. So Gomes wrote the play Odorico, o Bem-Amado with the idea of staging it at the Brazilian Comedy Theater in São Paulo, whose director Flávio Rangel turned it down because he chose to perform another work.

In 1962, Claudia magazine commissioned a short story for its Christmas issue from Dias Gomes, who sent Odorico, o Bem-Amado. Benjamin Cattan, director and producer of TV de Vanguarda, a program on São Paulo's TV Tupi, requested authorization from the Brazilian Society of Theatrical Authors to produce and broadcast the play, which was shown in June 1964. The play premiered at the theater in Salvador, the capital of Bahia, in 1965, and went on to be toured in other cities and to great success.

Gomes' text was adapted with modifications to become a soap opera for TV Globo, which began production in 1972.

The first to be shot in color for a telenovela in Brazil, with part of the costs covered by the Brazilian Electrical and Electronic Industry Association through a subsidy, the recording of O Bem-Amado began in November 1972, when a team made up of directors, technicians and lead actors traveled to Salvador to shoot the first external scenes, in which the character Odorico Paraguaçu visited the city from the fictional Sucupira, also in Bahia - this was reproduced in the Sepetiba neighborhood and nearby areas in Rio de Janeiro, where the entire plot was shot. Studio filming took place at Globo's headquarters in Jardim Botânico, also in Rio.

Broadcast during the period when Brazil was under military dictatorship, the soap opera was affected by interventions from the federal government's censorship service. In order to be aired, the chapters were edited in advance and sent for evaluation by the body responsible for approving or disapproving the public dissemination of entertainment works.

The actions of the censors, who feared unrest over Dias Gomes' texts, which were critical of the regime, consisted of vetoing several pages of the scripts of 37 chapters of the plot and banning words such as “captain” and “colonel” (used by the characters Odorico Paraguaçu and Zeca Diabo to refer to each other and considered by the military to have a negative use linked to them), resulting in the erasure of audio from recordings already made, as well as the implication of the behavior of the characters Odorico, who had a relationship with the three Cajazeiras sisters, and Telma, who was branded a libertine.

The novela's original intrigue theme, “Paiol de Pólvora”, was prevented from being used before the premiere due to verses seen as a form of protest against the actions of the military dictatorship. According to Toquinho, who composed and performed the song with Vinicius de Moraes, it was a reference to the Paiol Theater in Curitiba. To replace it, he wrote “O Bem-Amado”, sung by the group MPB4, credited on the plot's national soundtrack album as Coral Som Livre.

== Cast ==
- Paulo Gracindo - Odorico Paraguaçu
- Lima Duarte - Zeca Diabo (José Tranquilino da Conceição)
- Emiliano Queiroz - Dirceu Borboleta (Dirceu Fonseca)
- Ida Gomes - Doroteia Cajazeira
- Dorinha Duval - Dulcineia Cajazeira
- Dirce Migliaccio - Judiceia Cajazeira
- Jardel Filho - Dr. Juarez Leão
- Sandra Bréa - Telma Paraguaçu
- Zilka Salaberry - Donana Medrado
- Carlos Eduardo Dolabella - Neco Pedreira
- Lutero Luiz - Lulu Gouveia
- Milton Gonçalves - Zelão das Asas
- Gracindo Jr. - Jairo Portela
- Maria Cláudia - Gisa
- Dilma Lóes - Anita Medrado
- João Paulo Adour - Cecéu Paraguaçu
- Rogério Fróes - Vigário
- Ruth de Souza - Chiquinha do Parto
- Ana Ariel - Zora Paraguaçu
- Angelito Mello - Mestre Ambrósio
- João Carlos Barroso - Eustórgio
- Arnaldo Weiss - Libório
- Wilson Aguiar - Nezinho do Jegue
- Antônio Carlos Ganzarolli - Tião Moleza
- Ferreira Leite - Joca Medrado
- Augusto Olímpio - Cabo Ananias
- Apolo Corrêa - Maestro Sabiá
- Juan Daniel - Dom Pepito
- Suzy Arruda - Florzinha
- Isolda Cresta - Nancy
- Guiomar Gonçalves - Maria da Penha
- André Valli - Ernesto Cajazeira
- Nanai - Demerval Barbeiro
- Jorge Botelho - Nadinho
- Teresa Cristina Arnaud - Mariana
- Auriceia Araújo - Mãe de Zeca Diabo
- Júlio César - Isaque

== Special appearances ==
Intérprete	Personagem
Alciro Cunha	Salvador delegate taking statements from Juarez, suspect in the death of Dr. Nésio Frota
Analy Alvarez	Lúcia Leão
Antônio Victor	Juiz de Sucupira
Carla Daniel	
César Augusto	
Cláudio Ayres da Motta	a foreign journalist friend of Neco's who comes to Sucupira to gather news from the city
Claudioney Penedo	
Daniel Filho	
Enock Batista	Vilela
Geny do Amaral	Rosa Paraguaçu
Irma Álvarez	
Isabela Garcia	Ernesto's children
Ivan de Almeida	fisherman questioned by Chiquinha, who is looking for news of Zelão
José Maria Monteiro	
Lionel Fischer	
Luiz Magnelli	
Marcelo Baraúna	Jairo's lawyer
Maria Lygia	Anália Gouveia
Mário Lago	narrator (the last episode)
Milenka Rangan	Telma
Nanai	Demerval Barbeiro
Paulo Ramos	Dr. Gerson Novais
Rainer Wendell Oliveira	Odorico's friend
Ricardo Garcia	
Samuel Bertoldo	Odorico's friend
Thelma Reston

== Soundtrack ==
=== National ===
1. "Paiol de Pólvora" - Toquinho e Vinícius de Moraes
2. "Patota de Ipanema" - Maria Creusa
3. "Veja Você" - Toquinho e Maria Creusa
4. "Cotidiano N° 2" - Toquinho e Vinícius de Moraes
5. "O Bem Amado" - Coral Som Livre
6. "Meu Pai Oxalá" - Toquinho e Vinícius de Moraes
7. "Se o Amor Quiser Voltar" - Maria Creusa
8. "Um Pouco Mais de Consideração" - Toquinho
9. "Quem És?" - Nora Ney
10. "Se o Amor Quiser Voltar" - Orquestra Som Livre
11. "No Colo da Serra" - Toquinho e Vinícius de Moraes

=== International ===
1. "Also Sprach Zarathustra" - Eumir Deodato
2. "Fleur de Lune" - Françoise Hardy
3. "Listen" - Paul Bryan
4. "Masterpiece" - The Temptations
5. "I've Been Around" - Nathan Jones Group
6. "Poor Devil" - Free Sound Orchestra
7. "Dancing In The Moonlight" - David Jones
8. "Shine Shine" - David Hill
9. "Harmony" - Ben Thomas
10. "Take Time To Love Me" - The John Wagner Coalition
11. "Dancing To Your Music" - Archie Bell & The Drells
12. "I Could Never Imagine" - Chrystian
13. "Give Me Your Love" - The Sister Love
14. "Daddy's Home" - Jermaine Jackson
