= Hosni Al-Busaidi =

Omani footballer (born 1993)

Personal information
- Full name: Hosni Obaid Khadoom Al-Busaidi
- Date of birth: 5 June 1993 (age 33)
- Place of birth: Seeb, Oman
- Position: Centre-back

Team information
- Current team: Al-Seeb
- Number: 27

Senior career*
Years	Team	Apps	(Gls)
2012–	Al-Seeb		

International career
2012–	Oman	2	(0)
- * Club domestic league appearances and goals

Hosni Obaid Khadoom Al-Busaidi (Arabic: حسني عبيد خدوم البوسعيدي; born 5 June 1993), commonly known as Hosni Al-Busaidi, is an Omani footballer who plays for Al-Seeb Club in Oman Professional League.

== International career ==
Hosni was selected for the national team for the first time in 2012. He made his first appearance for Oman on 8 December 2012 against Lebanon in the 2012 WAFF Championship. He has made an appearance in the 2012 WAFF Championship and has represented the national team in the 2014 FIFA World Cup qualification.

== Honours ==
=== Club ===
Al-Seeb

- Oman Professional League Cup

Runners-up (1): 2013
