= Fahad Al-Jalabubi =

Omani footballer (born 1990)

Personal information
- Full name: Fahad Khamis Rashid Al-Jalabubi
- Date of birth: 14 August 1990 (age 36)
- Place of birth: Oman
- Position: Centre back

Team information
- Current team: Saham
- Number: 34

Senior career*
Years	Team	Apps	(Gls)
2009–2010	Al-Khaboora	?	(?)
2010–2013	Al-Suwaiq	?	(6)
2013–	Saham		(1)

International career
2010–	Oman	15	(0)
- * Club domestic league appearances and goals

Fahad Khamis Rashid Al-Jalabubi (Arabic: فهد خميس الجلبوبي; born 14 August 1990), commonly known as Fahad Al-Jalabubi, is an Omani footballer who plays for Saham SC in Oman Professional League.

== Club career ==
On 21 July 2013, he signed a one-year contract with Saham SC. On 9 July 2014, he agreed a one-year contract extension with Saham SC.

=== Club career statistics ===
Club	Season	Division	League		Cup		Continental (Note: Includes appearances in the AFC Champions League and AFC Cup)		Other (Note: Includes goal in the GCC Champions League)		Total	
Club	Season	Division	Apps	Goals	Apps	Goals	Apps	Goals	Apps	Goals	Apps	Goals
Al-Suwaiq	2011–12	Oman Elite League	-	2	-	0	4	0	-	0	-	2
Al-Suwaiq	2012–13	Oman Elite League	-	4	-	1	6	1	-	0	-	6
Al-Suwaiq	Total		-	6	-	1	10	1	-	0	-	8
Saham	2013–14	Oman Professional League	-	1	-	0	0	0	-	1	-	2
Saham	Total		-	1	-	0	0	0	-	1	-	2
Career total			-	7	-	1	10	1	-	1	-	10

== International career ==
Fahad is part of the first team squad of the Oman national football team. He was selected for the national team for the first time in 2010. He made his first appearance for Oman on 11 August 2010 in a friendly match against Kazakhstan. He has made appearances in the 2014 FIFA World Cup qualification and the 2015 AFC Asian Cup qualification.

== Honours ==
=== Club ===
- With Al-Suwaiq

- Omani League (2): 2010–11, 2012–13
- Sultan Qaboos Cup (1): 2012
- Omani Super Cup (1): 2013; Runner-Up 2011
