= Hazem Jawdat =

Jordanian footballer

Personal information
- Full name: Hazem Adnan Jawdat Abu Hussein
- Date of birth: 5 March 1984 (age 42)
- Place of birth: Zarqa, Jordan
- Height: 1.84 m (6 ft 0 in)
- Position: Left winger

Youth career
- 1996–2002: Al-Qadisiyah

Senior career*
Years	Team	Apps	(Gls)
2002–2011	Shabab Al-Ordon	?	
2011–2013	Hajer	35	(1)
2013	Al-Wehdat	?	
2013–2014	Sohar	14	(1)
2014–2018	That Ras		
2018–2019	Al-Ahli		
2019–2020	Shabab Al-Ordon		

International career
2009	Jordan	3	(0)
- * Club domestic league appearances and goals

Hazem Adnan Jawdat Abu Hussein (Arabic: حازم عدنان جودت أبو حسين; born 5 March 1984), commonly known as Hazem Jawdat, is a Jordanian former footballer.

== Style of play ==
Jawdat is a left winger for his team. He is also a free kick specialist and known for his speed.

== Club career ==
Jawdat began his professional career in 2002 with Shabab Al-Ordon. He scored nine goals in his nine-seasons long spell at the Amman based club.

After his promising performance with Shabab Al-Ordon, he moved to Saudi Arabia where he signed a contract with Saudi Professional League club, Hajer Club. He made thirty five league appearances for the club his two-seasons spell at the club scoring one goal in the 2012–13 season.

In 2013, he came back to Jordan and signed a contract with Al-Wehdat SC.

In the same season, he moved to Oman where he signed a contract with newly promoted side (To Oman Professional League), Sohar SC. He was the captain of his team throughout the 2013–14 season.

=== Club career statistics ===
Club	Season	Division	League		Cup		Continental		Other		Total	
Club	Season	Division	Apps	Goals	Apps	Goals	Apps	Goals	Apps	Goals	Apps	Goals
Shabab Al-Ordon	2006–07	Jordan Premier League	-	3	-	1	0	0	-	0	-	4
Shabab Al-Ordon	2007–08	Jordan Premier League	-	1	-	0	0	0	-	1	-	2
Shabab Al-Ordon	2008–09	Jordan Premier League	-	1	-	0	0	0	-	0	-	1
Shabab Al-Ordon	2009–10	Jordan Premier League	-	1	-	1	6	0	-	0	-	2
Shabab Al-Ordon	Total		-	6	-	2	6	0	-	1	-	9
Hajer	2011–12	Saudi Professional League	21	0	-	0	0	0	-	0	-	0
Hajer	2012–13	Saudi Professional League	14	1	-	0	0	0	-	0	-	1
Hajer	Total		35	1	-	0	0	0	-	0	-	1
Sohar	2013–14	Oman Professional League	14	1	-	0	0	0	-	0	-	1
Sohar	Total		14	1	-	0	0	0	-	0	-	1
Career total			-	8	-	2	6	0	-	1	-	11
