= Fernando Lopes (footballer) =

Brazilian footballer (born 1987)

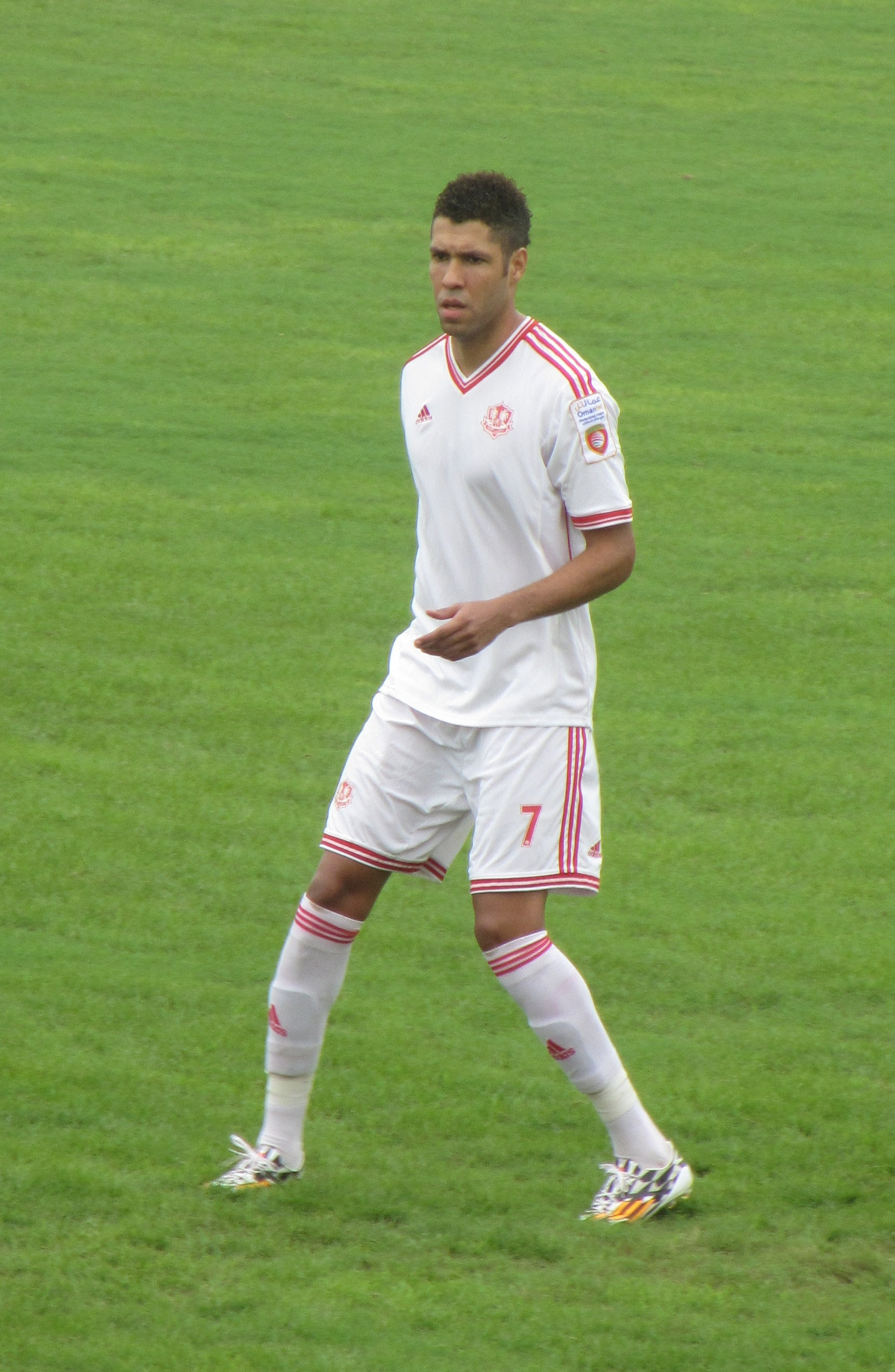
- Alcântara in 2014

Personal information
- Full name: Fernando Lopes Alcântara
- Date of birth: 28 March 1987 (age 39)
- Place of birth: Salvador, Bahia, Brazil
- Height: 1.91 m (6 ft 3 in)
- Positions: Centre-back; defensive midfielder

Team information
- Current team: Rangers (HKG)
- Number: 33

Youth career
- 1997–2000: Vitória
- 2001–2002: Bahia
- 2003–2004: Paysandu
- 2005: Jaguaré
- 2006: Mirassol
- 2007–2008: Independente de Limeira

Senior career*
Years	Team	Apps	(Gls)
2009	South China	2	(0)
2009–2011	Rabotnički	26	(2)
2011	Recife	0	(0)
2011–2012	Sham Shui Po	3	(0)
2012	Bangu	8	(1)
2013	Rio Verde–GO	0	(0)
2013	Macaé	0	(0)
2013–2014	Tarxien Rainbows	25	(1)
2014–2015	Dhofar Salalah	23	(5)
2015	Al-Ramtha		
2016–2017	Treze	17	(0)
2017–2018	Sergipe	1	(0)
2018–2019	Rangers (HKG)	25	(2)
2019–2020	Eastern District	10	(1)
2020–	Rangers (HKG)	47	(2)

Managerial career
- 2021–: Rangers (HKG) (assistant coach)
- * Club domestic league appearances and goals as of 16 May 2026

Fernando Lopes Alcântara (Chinese: 法蘭度; born 28 March 1987), also known as Fernando Lopes, is a Brazilian professional footballer who currently plays as a centre-back or a defensive midfielder for Hong Kong Premier League club Rangers. He is also the assistant coach of the club.

== Personal life ==
Fernando has two elder brothers, Fábio Lopes and Fabrício Alcântara who are both professional footballers and have both played in Hong Kong.

== Club career ==
=== Hong Kong ===
Fernando began his professional career away from his home nation in Hong Kong with South China in the Hong Kong First Division League in 2009. In his short spell at the club, he helped his side win the 2008–09 Hong Kong First Division League and win the runners-up place in the 2009 Hong Kong Community Shield.

=== Macedonia ===
After one season in Hong Kong, Fernando left for Europe, to Macedonia, where he signed a two-year contract with Macedonian First League club FK Rabotnički. He helped the Skopje-based club secure the runners-up place in the 2009–10 First Macedonian Football League and win the runners-up place in the 2009–10 Macedonian Football Cup. He made his Macedonian First League debut on 27 September 2009 in a 1–0 loss against FK Teteks and scored his first goal on 16 October 2010 in a 2–0 win over FK Turnovo. He scored 2 goals in 26 appearances in the 2009–10 First Macedonian Football League. He also made 5 appearances in the 2010–11 UEFA Europa League which included a 5–0 home and a 6–0 away wins over Andorran side FC Lusitanos, a 1–0 home win over Armenian side FC Mika and a 2–0 home and a 2–0 away losses against Merseyside club and English giants Liverpool

=== Back to Brazil ===
Fernando moved back to Brazil in 2011 and signed a contract with Sport Club do Recife, although he didn't play any matches for the Recife-based club.

=== Back to Hong Kong ===
Later the same season, Fernando signed a one-year contract with Sham Shui Po District-based, Sham Shui Po, who were a newly promoted club to the Hong Kong First Division. He made his debut for the newly promoted side in a 5–0 loss against Sun Hei. He played in three league matches but couldn't help the side to avoid relegation at the end of the 2011–12 Hong Kong First Division League.

=== Back to Brazil ===
In 2012, Fernando again came back to Brazil, this time to Rio de Janeiro where he signed a contract with Bangu Atlético Clube. He made his Campeonato Carioca debut on 5 February 2012 in a 2–1 loss against Americano Futebol Clube and scored his first goal on 15 April 2012 in a 3–0 win over Resende Futebol Clube. He played in 8 Campeonato Carioca matches, scoring 1 goal. He signed a short-term contract with Rio Verde in Goiás for the start of 2013, but made no appearances before moving to Rio de Janeiro and signing a six-months contract with Macaé Esporte Futebol Clube in February 2013. He represented the Rio de Janeiro-based club as an unused substitute in 4 matches.

=== Malta ===
In August 2013, Fernando returned to Europe, this time to Malta, where he signed a one-year contract with Tarxien-based Tarxien Rainbows F.C. He made his Maltese Premier League debut on 18 August 2013 in a 1–0 loss against Hibernians F.C. and scored his first goal on 22 February 2014 in a 1–1 draw against Vittoriosa Stars F.C. He played in 26 league matches, scoring one goal, and in one Maltese FA Trophy match on 21 January 2014 in a 0–0 draw against Qormi F.C. which his side later lost on penalties.

=== Oman ===
In July 2014, Fernando signed a one-year contract with Salalah-based Omani club Dhofar S.C.S.C. Soon after his arrival he helped his to club to win the 2014 Bani Yas International Tournament as his side won the finals 1–0 against Al-Hidd SCC of Bahraini Premier League, hence helping to win their first title of the 2014–15 season. He made his Oman Professional League debut and scored his first goal on 12 September 2014 in a 1–1 draw against Al-Khaboora SC. He also made his Sultan Qaboos Cup debut on 3 December 2014 in a 2–0 win over Madha SC in the Round of 32. He also made his Oman Professional League Cup debut and scored his first goal in the competition on 13 November 2014 in a 4–0 win over Bowsher Club. He scored 5 goals in 23 appearances in the 2014–15 Oman Professional League. He also scored 1 goal in 8 appearances in the 2014–15 Oman Professional League Cup.

=== Jordan ===
Fernando spent the first part of the 2015–16 season with Jordanian Premier League side Al-Ramtha.

=== Third return to Brazil ===
In February 2016, Fernando returned to Brazil again, signing for Campeonato Paraibano side Treze Futebol Clube. He made his debut on 6 March in a 1–1 draw with Sousa Esporte Clube. He went on to make 17 Campeonato Paraibano appearances over two seasons.

On 12 May 2017, Fernando left Treze to sign for CS Sergipe, joining up with former coach Marcelo Vilar to play in 2017 Campeonato Brasileiro Série D. He made his debut on 21 May in a 2–1 defeat to pt:Jacobina Esporte Clube.

=== Third return to Hong Kong ===
In the summer of 2018, Fernando returned to Hong Kong once again. It was confirmed in September by Rangers Director of Football Philip Lee that he had joined the club.

After playing for Eastern District in the 2019–20 season, it was announced on 14 October 2020 that Fernando would return to Rangers.

== Career statistics ==
As of 21 May 2017

Appearances and goals by club, season and competition
Club	Season	League			Cup		Continental (Note: Includes appearances in the UEFA Europa League.)		Other		Total	
Club	Season	Division	Apps	Goals	Apps	Goals	Apps	Goals	Apps	Goals	Apps	Goals
Rabotnički	2009–10	First Macedonian Football League	17	0	0	0	0	0	0	0	17	0
Rabotnički	2010–11	First Macedonian Football League	9	2	0	0	5	0	0	0	14	2
Rabotnički	Total		26	2	0	0	5	0	0	0	31	2
Sham Shui Po	2011–12	Hong Kong First Division League	3	0	0	0	0	0	0	0	3	0
Bangu	2012	Campeonato Carioca	8	1	0	0	0	0	0	0	8	1
Tarxien Rainbows	2013–14	Maltese Premier League	25	1	1	0	0	0	0	0	26	1
Dhofar	2014–15	Oman Professional League	23	5	10	1	0	0	0	0	33	6
Treze	2016	Campeonato Paraibano	4	0	0	0	0	0	0	0	4	0
Treze	2017	Campeonato Paraibano	13	0	0	0	0	0	0	0	13	0
Treze	Total		17	0	0	0	0	0	0	0	17	0
Career total			102	9	14	1	5	0	0	0	102	9

== Honours ==
Rangers

- Hong Kong Sapling Cup: 2023–24
