= Khalifa Ayil Al-Noufali =

Omani footballer (born 1984)

Khalifa Ayil
Personal information
- Full name: Khalifa Ayil Salim Al-Noufali
- Date of birth: 1 March 1984 (age 42)
- Place of birth: Oman
- Height: 1.80 m (5 ft 11 in)
- Position: Centre-back

Team information
- Current team: Bowsher
- Number: 99

Senior career*
Years	Team	Apps	(Gls)
2000–2004	Oman	?	(?)
2004–2005	Al-Riyadh	?	(6)
2005–2009	Al-Sadd	?	(20)
2009	Al-Ittifaq	?	(?)
2009–2010	Al-Ahli	11	(1)
2010–2011	Al-Kuwait	3	(1)
2011–2012	Al-Raed	5	(0)
2012–2013	Dhofar	?	
2013–2014	Al-Nahda	?	
2014–2016	Bowsher		

International career
2002–2010	Oman	67	(6)
- * Club domestic league appearances and goals

Khalifa Ayil Salim Al-Noufali (Arabic: خَلِيفَة عَايِل سَالِم النَّوْفَلِيّ; born 1 March 1984), commonly known as Khalifa Ayil, is an Omani footballer who plays for Bowsher Club in the Oman Professional League.

== Club career ==
Khalifa began his career with Oman Club. He quickly became a first team player for the club and after some fantastic showings he moved to a new club Al-Riyadh based in Riyadh, Saudi Arabia. He continued to make some impressive appearances and was quickly sought out by Qatari club Al-Sadd Sports Club which resulted in a promising deal at the club.

After his impressive appearances for Al-Sadd Sports Club, Europe soon came calling for the Omani international. At first he was wanted by Arsenal FC but Al-Sadd refused to deal with the club. He then went on a trial to Spain for Celta de Vigo where a potential loan deal could be sorted out. He fell out with the Al-Sadd management and board of directors by failing to give him his dream. It was mooted around that Celta wanted to take him first on loan with a view to playing him in the reserves and then consider a permanent transfer if the player was then eligible for a transfer to the Spanish club. However, he left Celta in August 2008 with his future very much up in the air.

In 2009, he joined top Saudi Arabian football team Al-Ittifaq. Later in the same year he came back to Qatar and signed a deal with Al-Ahli SC. In 2010, he played for Kuwaiti club Al-Kuwait SC and then after one year played for Al-Raed for almost one season. After successful stints at various clubs in the GCC he came back to his home country and signed a deal with Omani giants Dhofar. Just after one season in June 2013, Ayil signed a deal with Al-Nahda Club.

On 30 September 2014, he signed a one-year contract with Bowsher Club of the Oman Professional League.

=== Club career statistics ===
Club	Season	Division	League		Cup		Continental (Note: Includes appearances in the AFC Cup)		Other (Note: Includes goals in the GCC Champions League and club friendlies)		Total	
Club	Season	Division	Apps	Goals	Apps	Goals	Apps	Goals	Apps	Goals	Apps	Goals
Al-Riyadh	2004–05	Omani League	-	6	-	0	0	0	-	0	-	6
Al-Riyadh	Total		-	6	-	0	0	0	-	0	-	6
Al-Sadd	2005–06	Qatar Stars League	-	2	-	0	0	0	-	0	-	2
Al-Sadd	2006–07	Qatar Stars League	-	4	-	2	0	0	-	0	-	6
Al-Sadd	2007–08	Qatar Stars League	-	3	-	2	0	0	-	0	-	5
Al-Sadd	2008–09	Qatar Stars League	-	1	-	1	0	0	-	0	-	2
Al-Sadd	Total		-	10	-	5	0	0	-	0	-	15
Al-Ittifaq	2009–10	Saudi Professional League	-	0	-	0	0	0	-	2	-	2
Al-Ittifaq	Total		-	0	-	0	0	0	-	2	-	2
Al-Ahli	2009–10	Qatar Stars League	-	1	-	1	0	0	-	0	-	2
Al-Ahli	Total		-	1	-	1	0	0	-	0	-	2
Al-Kuwait	2010–11	Kuwaiti Premier League	-	1	-	0	0	0	0	0	-	1
Al-Kuwait	Total		-	1	-	0	0	0	0	0	-	1
Dhofar	2012–13	Oman Elite League	-	3	-	1	5	1	-	0	-	5
Dhofar	Total		-	3	-	1	5	1	-	0	-	5
Al-Nahda	2013–14	Oman Professional League	-	3	-	0	0	0	6	1	-	4
Al-Nahda	Total		-	3	-	0	0	0	6	1	-	4
Career total			-	24	-	7	5	1	-	3	-	35

== International career ==
=== Arabian Gulf Cup ===
Amad has made appearances in the 16th Arabian Gulf Cup, the 17th Arabian Gulf Cup, the 18th Arabian Gulf Cup and the 19th Arabian Gulf Cup.

He scored a goal in the 17th Arabian Gulf Cup in 2004 in a 3-1 win over Iraq hence helping his country to reach the semi-finals and then the finals of the Arabian Gulf Cup for the first time. But Oman lost in the final to the hosts, Qatar in a penalty shootout after the goalkeeping sensation Ali Al-Habsi missed a penalty. Qatar won the match 6-5 on penalties after the match had ended 1-1 at normal time. Amad Al-Hosni was awarded with the "Top Goal Scorer" award of the competition.

=== AFC Asian Cup ===
Khalifa has made appearances in the 2004 AFC Asian Cup qualification, the 2004 AFC Asian Cup, the 2007 AFC Asian Cup qualification and the 2011 AFC Asian Cup qualification.

He scored a goal in the 2011 AFC Asian Cup qualification in a 1-2 loss against Australia. Oman failed to qualify for the 2011 AFC Asian Cup.

=== FIFA World Cup qualification ===
Khalifa has made five appearances in the 2006 FIFA World Cup qualification and five in the 2010 FIFA World Cup qualification.

He scored a brace in the second round of 2006 FIFA World Cup qualification in a 7-0 win over Singapore.

== National team career statistics ==
=== Goals for senior national team ===
Scores and results list Oman's goal tally first.

#	Date	Venue	Opponent	Score	Result	Competition
1	9 June 2004	Sultan Qaboos Sports Complex, Muscat, Oman	Singapore	2–0	7–0	2006 FIFA World Cup qualification
2	9 June 2004	Sultan Qaboos Sports Complex, Muscat, Oman	Singapore	5–0	7–0	2006 FIFA World Cup qualification
3	1 December 2004	Manama, Bahrain	Latvia	2-0	3-2	Friendly
4	10 December 2004	Doha, Qatar	Iraq	3-0	3-1	17th Arabian Gulf Cup
5	13 February 2006	Muscat, Oman	Iraq	1-0	1-0	Friendly
6	21 November 2008	Muscat, Oman	Kenya	2-1	2-2	Friendly
7	30 January 2008	Muscat, Oman	Kuwait	1-0	1-1	Friendly
8	15 November 2009	Sultan Qaboos Sports Complex, Muscat, Oman	Australia	1-0	1-2	2011 AFC Asian Cup qualification

== Style of play ==
Khalifa is naturally a centre-back, although he is a versatile player and can play as a defensive midfielder too. Due to his aggressiveness, he has had a few disciplinary problems in his career. He is known for his spectacular long range shooting skills which he has demonstrated at both the club and country level on a regular basis.

== Honours ==
=== Club ===
- With Al-Kuwait
  - Kuwait Crown Prince Cup (1): 2011
- With Al-Nahda
  - Oman Professional League (1): 2013-14
  - Sultan Qaboos Cup (0): Runner-up 2013
