= Vinícius da Silva =

Brazilian footballer

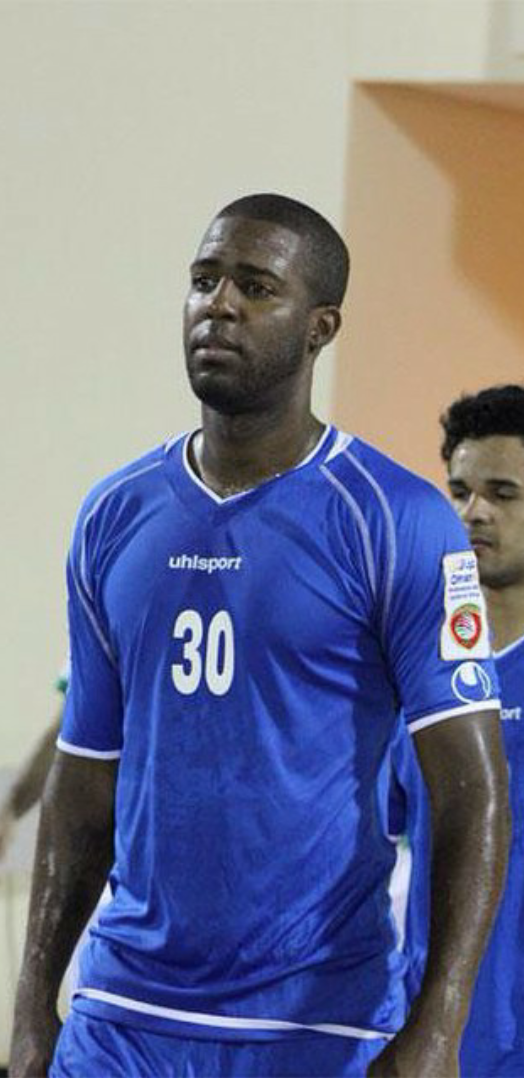
- Vinícius da Silva Salles, Brazilian footballer

Personal information
- Full name: Vinícius da Silva Salles
- Date of birth: 30 October 1982 (age 44)
- Place of birth: Ribeirão Preto, Brazil
- Height: 1.84 m (6 ft 0 in)
- Position: Right back

Youth career
- 1991–1998: Comercial

Senior career*
Years	Team	Apps	(Gls)
1998–2000	Comercial	?	(?)
2000–2004	Portuguesa	?	(?)
2004	Ethnikos Asteras	?	(?)
2005	Akratitos	?	(?)
2006–2007	Silva Jardim	?	(?)
2008–2009	Najran	?	(?)
2009–2010	Al-Tadamun	?	(2)
2010–2012	Shabab Al-Ordon	?	(?)
2012	Al-Muharraq	?	(?)
2012–2014	Saham		
- * Club domestic league appearances and goals

Vinícius da Silva Salles (born 30 October 1982), commonly known as Vinícius da Silva, is a Brazilian footballer.

== Club career ==
=== Brazil ===
Vinícius began his professional career in 1998 in Brazil with São Paulo-based Comercial Futebol Clube. In 2000, he moved to another São Paulo-based club Associação Portuguesa de Desportos.

=== Greece ===
He first moved out of Brazil in 2004 to Europe and more accurately to Greece where he signed a one-year contract with Athens-based Ethnikos Asteras F.C. In 2005, he again signed a contract with an Athens-based club Akratitos F.C.

=== Back to Brazil ===
In 2006, he came back to Brazil and signed a one-year contract with Silva Jardim Futebol Clube.

=== Saudi Arabia ===
In 2008, he again made a move out of Brazil and this time to the Middle East and more accurately to Saudi Arabia where he signed a one-year contract with Najran-based Najran SC.

=== Kuwait ===
In 2009, he again moved to a Middle Eastern country and this time to Kuwait where he signed a one-year contract with Al-Tadamun SC.

=== Jordan ===
In 2010, he again moved to a Middle Eastern country and this time to Jordan where he signed a two-year contract with Shabab Al-Ordon Club.

=== Bahrain ===
After a one and a half-year spell with Shabab Al-Ordon Club of Jordan, he moved to Bahrain where he signed a six-month contract with Al-Muharraq SC. He helped his club to achieve the runners-up place in the 2012 GCC Champions League.

=== Oman ===
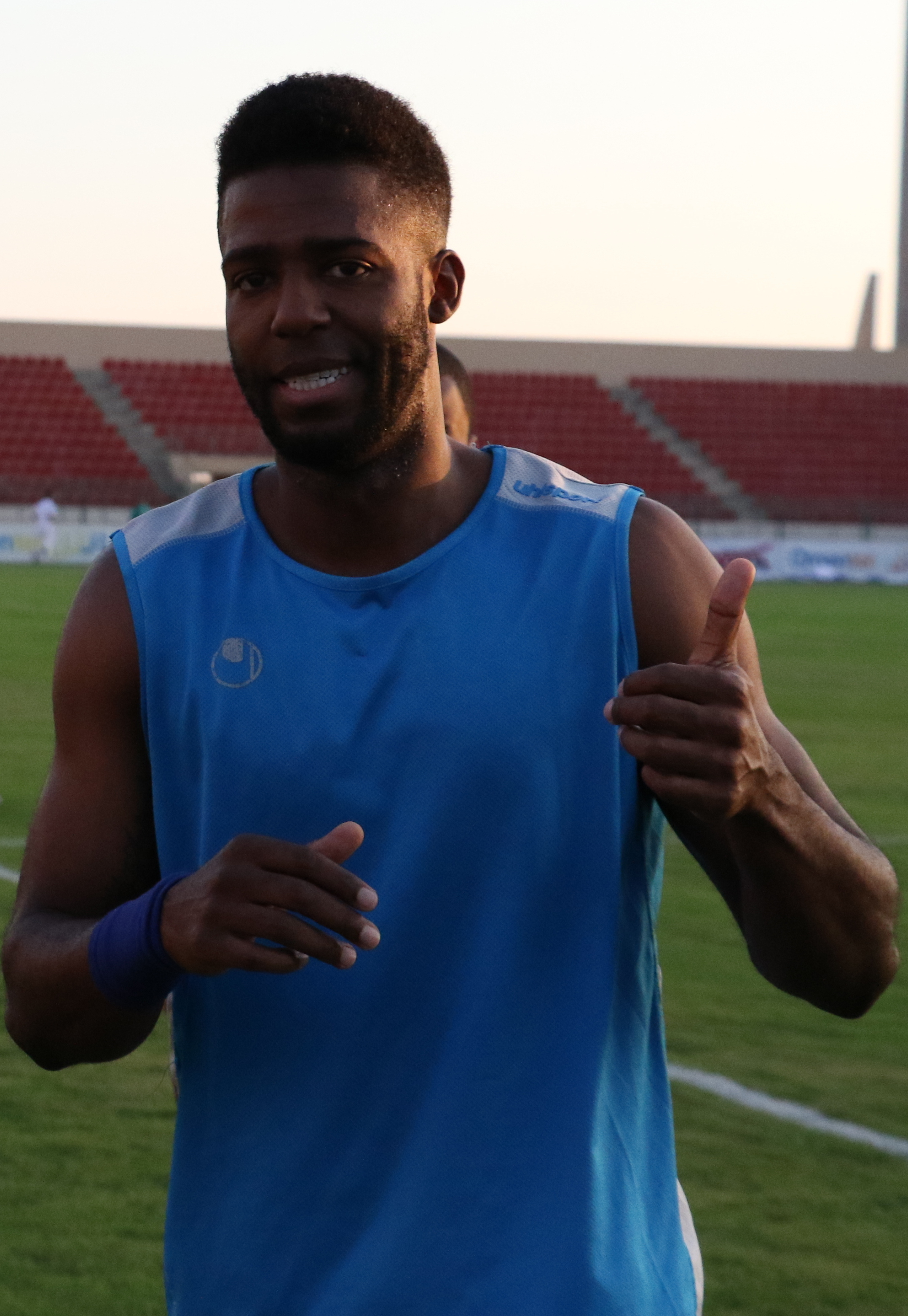
Vinícius da Silva Salles taking part in a training session with Saham SC - 2014 GCC Champions League

In December 2012, he again moved to a Middle Eastern country and this time to Oman where he signed a two-year contract with Saham SC. He helped the club to achieve the runners-up place in the 2012–13 Oman Federation Cup, win the 2013 Oman Professional League Cup and achieve the runners-up place in the 2014 GCC Champions League.

=== Club career statistics ===
Club	Season	Division	League		Cup		Continental		Other		Total	
Club	Season	Division	Apps	Goals	Apps	Goals	Apps	Goals	Apps	Goals	Apps	Goals
Al-Tadamun	2009–10	Kuwaiti Premier League	-	1	-	1	0	0	0	1	-	3
Al-Tadamun	Total		-	1	-	1	0	0	0	1	-	3
Saham	2013–14	Oman Professional League	-	0	-	0	0	0	0	1	-	1
Saham	Total		-	0	-	0	0	0	0	1	-	1
Career total			-	1	-	1	-	0	-	2	-	4

== Honours ==
=== Club ===
- With Al-Muharraq
  - GCC Champions League (0): Runner-up 2012
- With Saham
  - Oman Professional League Cup (1): 2013 Runner-up 2012
  - GCC Champions League (0): Runner-up 2014
