= Elijah Ari =

Footballer (born 1987)

Personal information
- Date of birth: 6 November 1987 (age 38)
- Place of birth: Ghana
- Height: 1.78 m (5 ft 10 in)
- Position: Defender

Team information
- Current team: Up Country Lions

Senior career*
Years	Team	Apps	(Gls)
2007–2010	Dordoi Bishkek		
2010	Vakhsh Qughonteppa		
2011	Regar-TadAZ		
2012	Energetik Dushanbe		
2013–2015	Regar-TadAZ		
2015	Bowsher Club		
2018	Akademija Osh	25	
2019	Sumida Ulaanbaatar	11	(7)
2020	Dushanbe-83	0	(0)
2021–	Up Country Lions	0	(0)

International career
2013–2014	Kyrgyzstan	8	(0)
- * Club domestic league appearances and goals as of 19 March 2021

Elijah Ari (born 6 November 1987), sometimes also known as Elijah Aryee, is a professional footballer who plays as a defender, for Up Country Lions in the Sri Lanka Champions League. Born in Ghana, he moved to Central Asia in 2007, and played three seasons in Kyrgyzstan for Dordoi Bishkek. From 2013 he represented the Kyrgyzstan national team internationally, making eight appearances in two years.

== Club career ==
The Ghanaian born Ari started his career in Dordoi Bishkek where he played three seasons and acquired Kyrgyzstani citizenship. He then spent one season with Vakhsh Qughonteppa in neighboring Tajikistan. He then played for Bowsher Club, in Oman.

On 31 March 2020, Ari was announced as part of Dushanbe-83's squad for the 2020 season. Ari left Dushanbe-83 during the 2020 season's summer transfer window, having not played for the club.

== International career ==
Ari has eight national appearances for Kyrgyzstan to his name.

== Career statistics ==
Appearances and goals by national team and year
National team	Year	Apps	Goals
Kyrgyzstan	2013	5	0
Kyrgyzstan	2014	3	0
Total		8	0
