= 2013–14 Oman Professional League =

Oman Professional League
- Season: 2013–14
- Champions: Al-Nahda
- Relegated: Majees; Al-Ittihad
- AFC Champions League qualifiers: Al-Nahda
- 2015 AFC Cup: Fanja
- Matches: 182
- Goals: 484 (2.66 per match)
- Top goalscorer: (Ivory Coast) Jumaa Saeed (Oman) Mohammed Al-Ghassani (16 goals)
- Biggest home win: Al-Seeb 8–1 Al-Ittihad (17 April 2014)
- Biggest away win: Al-Shabab 2-6 Al-Nahda (16 May 2014)
- Highest scoring: Al-Seeb 8–1 Al-Ittihad (17 April 2014); Al-Suwaiq 6–3 Majees (16 May 2014)
- Longest winning run: (5 games); Fanja
- Longest unbeaten run: (11 games); Al-Nahda
- Longest losing run: (6 games); Al-Oruba; Mjees; Sur

The 2013–14 Oman Professional League (known as the Omantel Professional League for sponsorship reasons) is the 38th edition of the top football league in Oman. The Oman Football League got the seal of approval of a professional league on 1 September 2013 and will henceforth be called the Omantel Professional League (OPL). The season began on 13 September 2013, and concluded on 16 May 2014. Al-Suwaiq Club were the defending champions, having won their third title in the previous 2012–13 Elite League season. On Sunday, 28 April 2014, Al-Nahda Club were crowned the champions of the inaugural Oman Professional League with one game remaining after Al-Suwaiq Club edged out ten-man Fanja SC 5-3. Fanja SC needed a draw or a win on Sunday to prolong the fight for the OPL title, after Al-Nahda Club defeated Saham SC 4-3 to take their tally to 51 points, but its defeat dashed any hopes for the eight-time winners to match the record of nine titles, held by Dhofar S.C.S.C. in the 37-year-old history of Oman's top flight competition.

== Teams ==
This season the league had 14 teams. Oman Club and Salalah SC were relegated to the First Division League after finishing in the relegation zone in the 2012–13 season. Al-Tali'aa SC were also relegated after losing the relegation/promotion playoff against Sohar SC. The three relegated teams were replaced by First Division League winners Al-Ittihad Club, runner-up Majees SC and second runner-up Sohar SC (Won the Relegation/Promotion playoff against Al-Tali'aa SC).

The winner and the runner-up will qualify for the 2015 AFC Cup

=== Stadia and locations ===
Locations of teams in the 2013–14 Omani League

Club	Home city	Manager	Stadium	Capacity
Al-Ittihad	Salalah	(Oman) Younis Amaan (Nov 2013–)	Al-Saada Stadium / Salalah Sports Complex	12,000 / 8,000
Al-Musannah	Al-Musannah	(Oman) Suhail Al-Rushaidi	Seeb Stadium	14,000
Al-Nahda	Al-Buraimi	(Oman) Hamad Al-Azani (May 2012–)	Nizwa Sports Complex	10,000
Al-Nasr	Salalah	(Iraq) Akram Ahmad Salman (Feb 2014–)	Al-Saada Stadium / Salalah Sports Complex	12,000 / 8,000
Al-Oruba	Sur	(Romania) Aristică Cioabă	Sur Sports Complex	8,000
Al-Seeb	Seeb	(Morocco) Youssef Al-Rafaly (Feb 2014–)	Seeb Stadium	14,000
Al-Shabab	Barka	(Oman) Mubarak Al-Gheilani (Feb 2014–)	Seeb Stadium	14,000
Al-Suwaiq	Al-Suwaiq	(Oman) Musabah Al-Saadi	Seeb Stadium	14,000
Dhofar	Salalah	(Croatia) Dragan Talajić (Jun 2013–)	Al-Saada Stadium / Salalah Sports Complex	12,000 / 8,000
Fanja	Fanja	(Italy) Guglielmo Arena (April 2014)	Seeb Stadium	14,000
Majees	Majees	(Oman) Mohammed Al-Saadi (Jan 2014–)	Sohar Regional Sports Complex	19,000
Saham	Saham	(Morocco) Abderrazak Khairi (Feb 2014–)	Sohar Regional Sports Complex	19,000
Sohar	Sohar	(Jordan) Adnan Al-Shuaibat (Feb 2014–)	Sohar Regional Sports Complex	19,000
Sur	Sur	(Morocco) Driss El Mrabet (Mar 2014–)	Sur Sports Complex	8,000

=== Managerial changes ===
Managerial changes during the 2013–14 campaign.

Team	Outgoing manager	Manner of departure	Replaced by
Al-Ittihad	(France) Noureddine Abu Falgha	Sacked	(Oman) Younis Amaan
Al-Nasr	(Serbia) Moscofetch Nebosha	Sacked	(Oman) Mohammed Al-Balushi
Al-Nasr	(Oman) Mohammed Al-Balushi	Caretaker role finished	(Iraq) Akram Ahmad Salman
Al-Oruba	(Morocco) Omar Mazian	Released	(Romania) Aristică Cioabă
Al-Seeb	(Romania) Petre Gigiu	Mutual Consent	(Brazil) Ralf Borges Ferreira
Al-Seeb	(Brazil) Ralf Borges Ferreira	Mutual Consent	(Morocco) Youssef Al-Rafaly
Al-Shabab	(Morocco) Driss El Mrabet	Sacked	(Oman) Mubarak Al-Gheilani
Fanja	(Spain) (Morocco) Hicham Jadrane	Resigned	(Oman) Mohsin Al-Kharusi
Fanja	(Oman) Mohsin Al-Kharusi	Caretaker role finished	(Italy) Guglielmo Arena
Mjees	(Bosnia and Herzegovina) Senad Kreso	Sacked	(Oman) Mohammed Al-Saadi
Saham	(Romania) Aristică Cioabă	Resigned	(Jordan) Ahmed Abdel-Qader
Saham	(Jordan) Ahmed Abdel-Qader	Mutual Consent	(Morocco) Abderrazak Khairi
Sohar	(Morocco) Abderrazak Khairi	Resigned	(Oman) Mohammed Khasib Al-Muqbali
Sohar	(Oman) Mohammed Khasib Al-Muqbali	Caretaker role finished	(Jordan) Adnan Al-Shuaibat
Sur	(Egypt) Ashraf Kasem	Released	(Romania) Petre Gigiu
Sur	(Romania) Petre Gigiu	Sacked	(Morocco) Driss El Mrabet

=== Foreign players ===
Restricting the number of foreign players strictly to four per team, including a slot for a player from AFC countries. A team could use four foreign players on the field during each game including at least one player from the AFC country.

Club	Player 1	Player 2	Player 3	AFC Player	Former Players
Al-Ittihad	TBD	TBD	TBD	TBD	(Senegal) Sarra Camara
Al-Musannah	(Brazil) João Luiz de Sá Miranda	(Brazil) Márcio José	(Togo) Francis Koné	(Syria) Rabea Jumaa	(Morocco) Youness Ouganna
Al-Nahda	(Senegal) Mouhamed Ablaye Gaye	(Ivory Coast) Juma Saeed	(Morocco) Abdessamad Ouhakki	(Bahrain) Jamal Rashid	(Brazil) Paulo Roberto Morais Júnior
Al-Nasr	(Serbia) Đorđe Vukobrat	(Morocco) Youssef Chakir	(Egypt) Mohamed Asaad	(Syria) Mahmoud Al-Youssef	
Al-Oruba	(Brazil) Rafael Barbosa do Nascimento	(Cameroon) Deumaga Tchangou	(Nigeria) Ajuzie Kelechi Martins	(China) Dilmurat Batur	(Ghana) Esme Mends (Egypt) Ahmed Salama (Egypt) Mohammed Fawzi
Al-Seeb	TBD	TBD	(Morocco) Habib Al-Dahmani	(Syria) Khaled Al-Brijawi	(Portugal) Edgar Marcelino
Al-Shabab	TBD	(Morocco) Youness Ouganna	(Equatorial Guinea) Lawrence Doe	(Jordan) Ahmed Hatamleh	(Brazil) Luomar
Al-Suwaiq	(Benin) Séïdath Tchomogo	(Iraq) Nadeem Karim	(Syria) Belal Abduldaim	(Syria) Oday Jafal	(Libya) Tarik El Taib
Dhofar	(Senegal) Sarra Camara	(Cameroon) Moustapha Moctar	(Kenya) Jamal Mohammed	(Syria) Mosab Balhous	(Ghana) Godwin Attram
Fanja	(Brazil) Felipe Lohmann	(Senegal) Ely Cissé	(Jordan) Mo'ayyad Abu Keshek	(Jordan) Khaled Saad	
Majees	(Equatorial Guinea) Baba Issaka	(Nigeria) Abiodun Dayo	(Morocco) Yassine Amlil	(Iraq) Saif Abdel Hamza	
Saham	(Brazil) Patrick da Silva	(Brazil) Vinícius da Silva Salles	(Ivory Coast) Diakite Brahima	(Syria) Mohamed Al-Zeno	(Ghana) Sadick Adams
Sohar	(Bosnia and Herzegovina) Adis Culov	(Bosnia and Herzegovina) Ekrem Hodžić	(Syria) Mardik Mardikian	(Jordan) Hazem Jawdat	
Sur	TBD	TBD	TBD	TBD	

== League table ==
Pos	Team	Pld	W	D	L	GF	GA	GD	Pts	Qualification or relegation
1	Al-Nahda (C)	26	18	3	5	57	23	+34	57	Qualification to the 2015 AFC Champions League Preliminary Round (Note: Al-Nahda played in the 2015 AFC Champions League qualifying play-off and failed to advance to the AFC Champions League group stage, hence entered the AFC Cup group stage.)
2	Fanja	26	15	7	4	44	27	+17	52	Qualification to the 2015 AFC Cup play-off Round
3	Al-Suwaiq	26	13	8	5	48	32	+16	47	Qualification to the 2015 GCC Champions League Group Stage
4	Al-Seeb	26	11	9	6	38	27	+11	42	Qualification to the 2015 GCC Champions League Group Stage
5	Al-Musannah	26	9	10	7	26	24	+2	37	
6	Dhofar	26	9	9	8	28	19	+9	36	
7	Sohar	26	9	9	8	35	35	0	36	
8	Saham	26	9	8	9	36	34	+2	35	
9	Sur	26	9	7	10	38	38	0	34	
10	Al-Shabab	26	8	10	8	36	38	−2	34	
11	Al-Oruba	26	9	7	10	29	34	−5	34	
12	Al-Nasr	26	7	7	12	27	35	−8	28	Relegation Playoff
13	Majees (R)	26	3	5	18	27	65	−38	14	Relegation to 2014–15 Oman First Division League
14	Al-Ittihad (R)	26	1	4	21	20	58	−38	7	Relegation to 2014–15 Oman First Division League

Source: League Table
Rules for classification: 1) points; 2) goal difference; 3) number of goals scored.
(C) Champions; (R) Relegated

== Results ==
Home \ Away	ALI	ALM	ALNH	ALN	ALO	ALS	ALSH	ALSU	DHO	FAN	MJS	SAH	SOH	SUR
Al-Ittihad		1–1	0–2	0–2	0–3	1–2	2–3	0–3	0–2	0–1	2–2	1–3	1–2	1–2
Al-Musannah	1–0		0–0	1–0	1–0	1–2	0–0	0–2	1–0	1–1	3–0	3–1	3–1	1–0
Al-Nahda	2–0	3–0		3–1	1–2	1–2	3–1	4–2	0–0	0–1	6–0	0–1	2–1	1–1
Al-Nasr	2–0	0–0	0–2		2–1	0–0	3–0	1–2	1–4	1–2	1–2	0–1	0–1	2–1
Al-Oruba	2–1	1–1	1–4	2–1		1–0	2–1	0–1	1–0	0–1	1–1	1–1	2–2	0–3
Al-Seeb	8–1	1–0	0–1	2–2	1–0		0–2	0–0	1–1	2–0	2–0	1–0	2–2	3–3
Al-Shabab	2–0	0–1	2–6	4–0	1–0	0–0		2–2	2–1	1–1	2–1	1–1	1–1	1–1
Al-Suwaiq	3–2	3–1	1–2	0–1	0–0	1–0	2–1		0–0	3–3	6–3	1–2	1–0	0–1
Dhofar	1–0	2–2	0–2	2–0	4–0	0–0	0–0	2–2		0–1	2–1	1–0	0–0	1–0
Fanja	4–2	1–1	1–3	0–0	3–1	3–2	1–1	3–5	1–0		5–0	3–2	2–1	2–0
Majees	2–1	1–1	1–2	0–2	1–4	2–3	3–3	1–3	0–3	0–1		0–3	1–1	2–1
Saham	1–1	0–2	3–4	2–2	1–1	1–2	3–1	2–2	1–0	0–0	2–1		1–0	1–2
Sohar	1–1	2–0	2–1	3–3	0–1	2–0	2–1	1–1	1–0	1–0	3–1	2–2		2–4
Sur	1–2	2–0	0–2	0–0	2–2	2–2	2–3	0–2	2–2	0–3	2–1	2–1	4–1	

Updated to match(es) played on 16 May 2014. Source: Results
Legend: Blue = home team win; Yellow = draw; Red = away team win.

== Clubs season-progress ==
Team ╲ Round	1	2	3	4	5	6	7	8	9	10	11	12	13	14	15	16	17	18	19	20	21	22	23	24	25	26
Al-Ittihad	L	L	L	D	L	L	L	L	D	L	D	L	L	W	L	L	L	L	D	L	L	L	L	L	L	L
Al-Musannah	W	W	L	W	L	D	L	W	L	D	D	W	D	W	D	D	L	L	W	L	D	W	D	W	D	W
Al-Nahda	W	L	W	W	D	W	L	W	W	W	L	W	L	W	W	D	W	W	D	W	W	W	W	W	L	W
Al-Nasr	L	L	W	D	W	W	L	L	L	L	D	D	D	W	L	D	L	W	L	W	D	L	W	L	D	L
Al-Oruba	L	L	L	L	L	L	W	W	W	D	W	L	W	W	D	D	W	D	L	W	D	L	D	L	W	D
Al-Seeb	W	W	D	D	W	L	D	D	W	W	W	D	L	W	L	L	L	W	D	D	D	L	W	W	D	W
Al-Shabab	D	L	W	D	W	D	W	L	D	D	L	W	D	L	D	W	W	D	L	L	D	L	W	W	D	L
Al-Suwaiq	W	L	W	L	D	W	W	W	D	W	D	W	L	D	D	W	L	D	D	W	D	D	L	W	W	W
Dhofar	W	W	L	W	D	D	D	L	D	D	W	L	W	W	W	W	L	L	L	D	D	D	L	D	L	W
Fanja	D	W	W	D	D	W	W	W	L	D	D	W	W	D	W	W	W	W	W	L	L	W	D	L	W	W
Majees	L	L	L	D	L	L	L	L	L	L	D	L	L	L	W	L	W	D	W	L	D	L	L	L	D	L
Saham	L	W	W	L	D	W	W	W	D	D	W	W	L	L	D	L	L	L	D	W	D	W	D	L	D	L
Sohar	L	W	D	L	D	D	L	L	D	D	D	L	L	W	D	W	W	L	W	L	W	W	W	W	D	D
Sur	W	L	W	W	L	W	D	W	W	L	L	L	L	L	L	D	W	D	D	W	D	L	W	D	D	L

Updated to match(es) played on 16 May 2014. Source: Clubs Season-Progress
W = Win; D = Draw; L = Lose

== Promotion/relegation play-off ==
=== 1st leg ===
19 May 2014
18:00 UTC+4

Al-Mudhaibi	0 – 1	Al-Nasr
		Said 65'

Seeb Stadium, Seeb, Oman

=== 2nd leg ===
23 May 2013
19:30 UTC+4

Al-Nasr	2 - 0	Al-Mudhaibi
Said 6', 90+5'

Al-Saada Stadium, Salalah, Oman

Al-Nasr secured promotion after winning 3-0 on aggregate

== Season statistics ==
As of 16 May 2014

=== Top scorers ===
Rank	Scorer	Club	Goals
1	(Ivory Coast) Jumaa Saeed	Al-Nahda	16
1	(Oman) Mohammed Al-Ghassani	Al-Suwaiq	16
3	(Senegal) Mouhamed Ablaye Gaye	Al-Nahda	13
4	(Syria) Mardik Mardikian	Sohar	11
4	(Oman) Saud Al-Farsi	Sur	11
6	(Senegal) Sarra Camara	Dhofar	10
6	(Oman) Younis Al-Mushaifri	Al-Shabab	10
6	(Senegal) Ely Cissé	Fanja	10
7	(Oman) Abdulaziz Al-Noufali	Al-Seeb	9
7	(Syria) Mohamed Al-Zeno	Saham	9

=== Top Omani Scorers ===
Rank	Scorer	Club	Goals
1	(Oman) Mohammed Al-Ghassani	Al-Suwaiq	16
2	(Oman) Saud Al-Farsi	Sur	11
3	(Oman) Younis Al-Mushaifri	Al-Shabab	10
4	(Oman) Abdulaziz Al-Noufali	Al-Seeb	9
5	(Oman) Said Al-Ruzaiqi	Al-Oruba SC	8
6	(Oman) Waleed Al-Saadi	Al-Musannah	7
6	(Oman) Mohsin Johar	Saham	7
6	(Oman) Abdulaziz Al-Muqbali	Fanja	7
6	(Oman) Tariq Al-Thehli	Majees	7
10	(Oman) Mutassim Al-Shibli	Sohar	6
10	(Oman) Raed Ibrahim Saleh	Fanja	6
10	(Oman) Hamoud Al-Saadi	Dhofar	6
10	(Oman) Al-Abd Al-Noufali	Al-Suwaiq	6

=== Hat-tricks ===
Player	Club	Against	Result	Date
(Oman) Saud Al-Farsi	Sur	Sohar	4—1	29 March 2014
(Ivory Coast) Jumaa Saeed	Al-Nahda	Fanja	3—1	29 March 2014
(Oman) Said Al-Ruzaiqi	Al-Oruba SC	Al-Ittihad	3—0	29 March 2014
(Oman) Abdul Aziz Al-Noufali ^{*}	Al-Seeb Club	Al-Ittihad	8—1	17 April 2014
(Oman) Salim Al-Shamsi	Al-Nahda	Al-Shabab	6—2	16 May 2014

^{*} Player scored 4 goals

== OFA Awards ==
Oman Football Association awarded the following awards for the 2013–14 Oman Professional League season.

- Top Scorer: Juma Saeed (Al-Nahda)
- Best Player: Juma Saeed (Al-Nahda)
- Best Goalkeeper: Faiz Al-Rushaidi (Al-Suwaiq)
- Best Coach: Hamad Al-Azani (Al-Nahda)

== Media coverage ==
Omantel Professional League Media Coverage
Country	Television Channel	Matches
Oman	Oman Sports TV	4 Matches per round

== Controversies ==
The league was the subject of controversies like the wearing of similar-coloured jerseys, unusual hairstyles and excessive goal celebrations.

On 20 September 2013, the match between Sur SC and Majees SC was called off by referee Fahad Al-Subahi on the premise that the teams were wearing similar-coloured jerseys'. But just three days later, the Oman Professional League's Disciplinary Committee decided to replay the match and ruled that Subahi had erred in his judgement. The match was replayed on 12 November 2013 which Sur SC won 2-1.

The Oman Football Association came out with a new code of conduct for players after a controversy in the aftermath of a football match between Fanja SC and Al-Nahda Club. According to the new regulations, OFA prohibits players from extreme celebrations on the field after scoring a goal and the governing body also bans players sporting unusual hairstyles or even colouring their hair. As a result, excessive goal celebrations and unusual hairstyles have been shown the red card by the OFA as it moves to protect the 'ethics' of the game. The decision came after Al-Nahda Club's Ivorian player Juma Saeed was seen 'inappropriately' celebrating on the field after scoring a goal against Fanja SC on 29 March 2014 that raised heated debates among the football aficionados in the country. However, the Ivory Coast player was reprimanded with a warning. OFA also decided to make the OPL's Disciplinary Committee an autonomous body with additional powers. Headed by the OFA board member Hamad Al-Hadrami, the Disciplinary Committee can now take action against players violating the new code of conduct. OFA also gave powers to the match referees who will now inspect the dressing room before any domestic games to ensure the players adhere to the code of conduct.

== See also ==
- 2013–14 Sultan Qaboos Cup
- 2013–14 Oman Professional League Cup
- 2013–14 Oman Super Cup
- 2013–14 Oman First Division League
- 2013–14 Oman Second Division League
