= Željko Markov =

Serbian footballer and manager

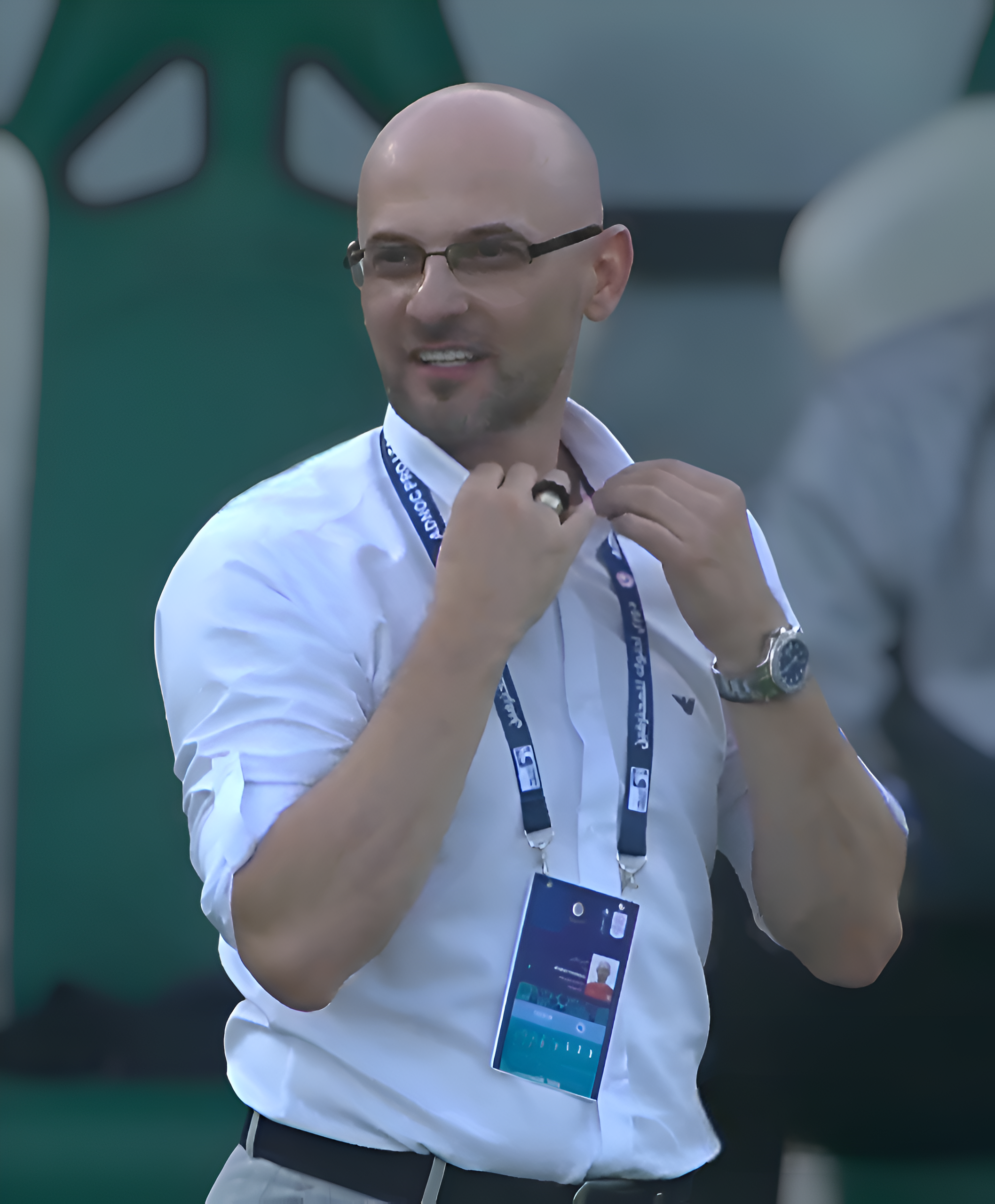

Personal information
- Full name: Željko Markov
- Date of birth: 20 September 1976 (age 50)
- Place of birth: Pančevo, SFR Yugoslavia

Managerial career
- Years: Team
- 2007–2008: Dinamo Pančevo
- 2010: Spijkenisse
- 2011–2012: Sohar
- 2012: Oman Club
- 2014: Sitra
- 2014: Al-Ittihad
- 2015: Bosher
- 2016: Al Mesaimeer
- 2019–2020: Al-Tadamon
- 2022: Kazma
- 2023: Hatta
- 2023–2024: Fujairah

Željko Markov (Serbian Cyrillic: Жељко Марков; born 20 September 1976) is a Serbian football manager, who was in charge of Fujairah.

== Honours and awards ==
- Mesaimeer SC
  - Qatargas League: 3rd place 2017
- Sohar SC
  - Sultan Qaboos Cup: 1/2 final 2011
