= Christopher Mends =

Welsh Methodist exhorter and Independent minister (1724?–1799)

Christopher Mends (22 February 1724 or 1725 – 5 April 1799) was a Methodist exhorter and later an independent minister.

== Biography ==
Mends' birth is of uncertain origin: he was born either at the Cotts near Hasguard, Pembrokeshire, or at Haverfordwest, on 22 February 1724 or 1725, one of nine children of a cloth merchant.

By 1741, Mends worked as a fuller with his brother, William, at Laugharne. After hearing George Whitefield's preachings, the brothers became exhorters. In January 1745, Mends was appointed to exhort in East Walton and Studder. Mends studied at Carmarthen Academy under independent minister Evan Davies for some of his training.

By September 1748, the brothers had established a meeting house in Laugharne, which was registered as a dissenting meeting house by January 1750. Mends was ordained as a Congregationalist in Brinkworth, Wiltshire. In 1761, he moved to Plymouth, where he died on 5 April 1799.
