= Jamal Nabi Al-Balushi =

Omani footballer (born 1981)

Jamal Al-Balushi
Personal information
- Full name: Jamal Nabi Bakhsh Al-Balushi
- Date of birth: 22 December 1981 (age 44)
- Place of birth: Oman
- Position: Defender

Team information
- Current team: Muscat
- Number: 7

Senior career*
Years	Team	Apps	(Gls)
1999–2000	Bowsher	?	
2001–2003	Al-Ahli	?	
2003–2009	Muscat	?	

International career
1997–2004	Oman	28	(0)
- * Club domestic league appearances and goals

Jamal Nabi Bakhsh Al-Balushi commonly known as Jamal Al-Balushi (Arabic: جمال النبى بخش البلوشي; born 22 December 1981) is an Omani footballer who plays for Muscat Club. He was a member of the Oman national football team till 2004.

== International career ==
He was part of the first team squad of the Oman national football team till 2004. Jamal was selected for the national team for the first time in 1997. He has made appearances in the 2002 FIFA World Cup qualification and has represented the national team in the 2006 FIFA World Cup qualification.
