= Baba Issaka =

Ghanaian footballer

Personal information
- Full name: Abudulai Issaka
- Date of birth: 6 March 1982 (age 44)
- Place of birth: Cape Coast, Ghana
- Height: 1.77 m (5 ft 10 in)

Senior career*
| Years | Team | Apps | (Gls) |
| 2001 | Jokerit | 6 | (0) |
- St. Patrick's Athletic
- → Kilkenny City (loan)
- Dundalk
| 2008-2009 | Kildare County | 9+ | (0+) |
| 2010 | Al-Nahda | | |
| 2013 | Majees | | |
| 2013-2014 | Qormi | 6 | (0) |
| 2014 | Sandweiler | 1+ | (0+) |
| 2015 | Turnhout | 8 | (0) |
- Diest
| 2018 | Athlone Town | 8 | (1) |

International career
| 2013 | Equatorial Guinea | 1 | (0) |
- * Club domestic league appearances and goals

Abudulai Issaka (born 6 March 1982) is a former footballer who is last known to have played as a defender for Athlone Town. Bornand raised in Ghana, he played for the national team.

== Career ==
Before the 2001 season, Issaka signed for Jokerit in Finland, before joining Dundalk.

In 2008, he signed for Kildare County in the Irish second division.

In 2013, he signed for Maltese side Qormi from Majees in Oman.

In 2014, Issaka signed for Luxembourgish second division team Sandweiler.

Before the second half of 2014/15, he signed for Turnhout in the Belgian fourth division.
