= Rabea Jumaa =

Syrian footballer (born 1992)

Personal information
- Full name: Rabea Jumaa
- Date of birth: 10 April 1992 (age 34)
- Place of birth: Lattakia, Syria
- Height: 1.75 m (5 ft 9 in)
- Position: Forward

Team information
- Current team: Al-Musannah
- Number: 8

Senior career*
Years	Team	Apps	(Gls)
2007–2013	Tishreen		
2013	Al-Mudhaibi		
2014	Al-Musannah		
2014–	Etehad Al Zarqah		

International career
2007–2008	Syria U-17		
2009–2010	Syria U-20		
- * Club domestic league appearances and goals

Rabea Jumaa (Arabic: ربيع جمعة; born 10 April 1992) is a Syrian footballer who plays for Etehad Al Zarqah in the Jordan League Division 1.

== Club career ==
Rabea began his professional career with Tishreen SC in 2007.

In September 2013, he moved to Al-Mudhaibi Club of Oman. In January 2014, he moved to Al-Musannah SC of Oman.

== International career ==
Between 2007 and 2010, he made appearances for the Syria national under-17 football team and the Syria national under-20 football team. In 2010, an injury forced him out of the squad for the 2010 AFC U-19 Championship.
