= Vinícius Garcia =

Brazilian footballer

Personal information
- Full name: Vinicius de Souza Garcia
- Date of birth: 20 January 1997 (age 29)
- Place of birth: Florianópolis, Brazil
- Height: 1.75 m (5 ft 9 in)
- Position: Midfielder

Team information
- Current team: Batel

Youth career
- 2009–2012: Avaí
- 2012–2017: São Paulo

Senior career*
Years	Team	Apps	(Gls)
2017–2018	São Paulo B	21	(2)
2019	Bahia	0	(0)
2020	Pelotas	11	(0)
2020	Avaí	0	(0)
2021–2022	Juventus-SC	15	(0)
2022	Próspera	4	(0)
2023	Audax-RJ	8	(0)
2023	Ponte Preta	6	(0)
2024	Portuguesa-RJ	17	(0)
2025	Mixto	5	(0)
2025	Juventus-SC	9	(0)
2026	Monsoon	11	(1)
2026–	Batel	4	(0)
- * Club domestic league appearances and goals as of 22 July 2026

Vinícius de Souza Garcia (born 20 January 1997), better known as Vinícius Garcia, is a Brazilian professional footballer who plays as a midfielder.

== Career ==
Vinícius began his career as a professional at São Paulo B, which competed in the Copa Paulista in 2017. In 2018, he was still part of the champion squad of the Campeonato Brasileiro de Aspirantes. He also played for Bahia, Pelotas, Avaí, Juventus-SC, Próspera and Audax Rio, where he was a highlight of the Taça Rio runner-up team in 2023. He was hired by Ponte Preta to compete in 2023 Campeonato Brasileiro Série B.

For the 2025 season, Garcia signed a contract with Mixto EC. In March, he transferred to Juventus-SC. In 2026, he competed in the Campeonato Gaúcho for Monsoon FC and the second tier of the Paraná state championship for AA Batel.

== Honours ==
São Paulo

- Campeonato Brasileiro Sub-23: 2018
- Copa do Brasil Sub-20: 2018
