= Vinícius (footballer, born 1982) =

Brazilian footballer

Vinicius
Personal information
- Full name: Carlos Vinicius Neves da Silva
- Date of birth: 10 August 1982 (age 44)
- Place of birth: Rio de Janeiro, Brazil
- Height: 1.85 m (6 ft 1 in)
- Position: Defender

Team information
- Current team: Artsul

Senior career*
Years	Team	Apps	(Gls)
2003	Bangu		
2003	Dijon FCO	27	(0)
?	?		
2006	Villa Rio		
2006–2007	F.C. Penafiel	32	(0)
2008–2009	Mesquita Futebol Clube	0	(0)
2008	→ Angra dos Reis (loan)	0	(0)
2009–	Artsul		
- * Club domestic league appearances and goals as of 18:52, 13 February 2008 (UTC)

Carlos Vinicius Neves da Silva (born 10 August 1982), better known as just Vinicius or Vini, is a Brazilian footballer, who plays for Artsul.

== Career ==
In August 2003, he was signed by Dijon FCO in Championnat National.

In August 2006, he joined F.C. Penafiel in Liga de Honra and in summer leave Penafiel and joined in January 2008 to Mesquita Futebol Clube.

In July 2008, he left on loan to Angra dos Reis Esporte Clube
