= 2013–14 Oman Professional League Cup =

Tournament details
- Country: Oman
- Teams: 14

Final positions
- Champions: Saham
- Runner-up: Al-Seeb

Tournament statistics
- Matches played: 48
- Goals scored: 88 (1.83 per match)

The 2013–14 Oman Professional League Cup was the third edition of a pre-season football competition held in Oman. It was the first edition since football in Oman entered the professional era.

The competition featured four groups of 3-4 teams(Group A and B featured 3 teams and Group C and D featured 4 teams), with the group stage winners entering the semi-final stage. Groups featuring three sides played each other twice so that each team could play 6 matches in the group phase.

The competition featured all the clubs playing in the top flight in the 2013–14 season.

The competition started on 15 August 2013 and finished on 16 November 2013.

== Group stage ==
=== Group A ===
Team	Pld	W	D	L	GF	GA	GD	Pts
(Oman) Fanja	6	2	4	0	8	4	+4	10
(Oman) Sur	6	2	3	1	5	6	−1	9
(Oman) Al-Oruba	6	0	3	3	5	8	−3	3

=== Group B ===
Team	Pld	W	D	L	GF	GA	GD	Pts
(Oman) Al-Nasr	6	4	1	1	8	4	+4	13
(Oman) Dhofar	6	4	0	2	7	4	+3	12
(Oman) Al-Ittihad	6	0	1	5	0	7	−7	1

=== Group C ===
Team	Pld	W	D	L	GF	GA	GD	Pts
(Oman) Al-Seeb	6	4	1	1	9	5	+4	13
(Oman) Al-Suwaiq	6	2	2	2	5	3	+2	8
(Oman) Al-Shabab	6	0	5	1	1	2	−1	5
(Oman) Al-Musannah	6	1	2	3	2	7	−5	5

=== Group D ===
Team	Pld	W	D	L	GF	GA	GD	Pts
(Oman) Saham	6	4	1	1	10	4	+6	13
(Oman) Al-Nahda	6	3	2	1	13	7	+6	11
(Oman) Sohar	6	2	1	3	7	11	−4	7
(Oman) Mjees	6	0	2	4	4	12	−8	2

== Semi finals ==
29 October 2013
16:45 UTC+4

Al-Seeb	2 – 1	Al-Nasr

Sultan Qaboos Sports Complex, Muscat, Oman
29 October 2013
19:30 UTC+4

Fanja	0 – 1	Saham

Sultan Qaboos Sports Complex, Muscat, Oman

== Final ==
16 November 2013
18:30 UTC+4

Al-Seeb	0 – 0	Saham
Penalties
	2 – 3

Seeb Stadium, Seeb, Oman
