= Bosher Club =

Omani sports club

Bosher Club نادي بوشر
- Full name: Bosher Club
- Nicknames: Asfar Al-A'asima (Yellow of the Capital)
- Founded: 1972; 54 years ago
- Ground: Sultan Qaboos Sports Complex; Royal Oman Police Stadium; Boshar, Muscat, Oman
- Capacity: 28,000; 12,000
- Chairman: Sheikh Saif Ahmed Al-Khalili
- League: Oman First Division League
Home colours	Away colours	Third colours

Bosher Club is an Omani professional football club based in Bosher. Their home ground is Sultan Qaboos Sports Complex. They also recognize the older Royal Oman Police Stadium as their home ground.

== History ==
The club was founded on 31 January 1972 and registered on 26 June 2002.

== Multisport club ==
Bosher Club also has hockey, volleyball, handball, basketball, badminton and squash. They also have youth football teams.

== Honours and achievements ==
=== National titles ===
- Oman First Division League (1):

- Winners 2013-14

== Current squad ==
Note: Flags indicate national team as defined under FIFA eligibility rules; some limited exceptions apply. Players may hold more than one non-FIFA nationality.

No.	Pos.	Nation	Player
26	GK	OMA	Ahmed Al-Habsi
5	DF	MAR	Moghny Reda
6	DF	OMA	Ali Al-Saadi
12	DF	OMA	Hani Al-Hidabi
15	DF	OMA	Sulaiman Al-Wardi
44	DF	OMA	Aslam Al-Nabhani
55	DF	OMA	Mahmood Hamad Al-Hasani
66	DF	OMA	Hilal Al-Rawahi
99	DF	OMA	Khalifa Ayil Al-Noufali
7	MF	OMA	Nabil Al-Atari
8	MF	OMA	Adil Al-Hidabi
11	MF	OMA	Taisir Al-Hilali

No.	Pos.	Nation	Player
13	MF	TUN	Amin Al-Majri (Captain)
16	MF	OMA	Mundhar Al-Hidabi
17	MF	OMA	Al-Mutassim Al-Mukhaini
19	MF	OMA	Nooh Al-Ghawi
20	MF	OMA	Hussain Al-Batashi
21	MF	OMA	Ahmed Al-Shibli
27	DF	BRA	Fernando Lopes
29	MF	OMA	Yaqhtan Hebrew
33	MF	OMA	Ghassan Al-Salti
77	MF	OMA	Khalid Mubarak
9	FW	OMA	Said Al-Ghadani
45	FW	OMA	Fahad Al-Shuhimi

== Personnel ==
=== Current technical staff ===
Position	Name
Head coach	(Serbia) Željko Markov
Assistant coach	(Oman) Jamal Nabi Al-Balushi
Goalkeeping coach	(Oman) Sultan Al-Balushi
Team Manager	(Oman) Yahya Mohammed Al-Wahaibi
Team Manager	(Oman) Salim Al-Amri
Team Manager	(Oman) Badr Al-Mashari
Team Manager	(Oman) Yusri Al-Izzi
Club doctor	(Oman) Samir Al-Hamdani

== See also ==
- List of football clubs in Oman
