= Esme Mends =

Ghanaian footballer

Personal information
- Full name: Anamuah Esme Papa Mends
- Date of birth: February 22, 1986 (age 40)
- Place of birth: Saltpond, Ghana
- Height: 1.78 m (5 ft 10 in)
- Position: Attacking midfielder

Team information
- Current team: Al-Oruba SC
- Number: 14

Youth career
- Mpohor Iron Fighters
- Great Ambassadors

Senior career*
Years	Team	Apps	(Gls)
2004–2008	Real Sportive	?	(?)
2008–2013	Accra Hearts of Oak SC	?	(?)
2013–	Al-Oruba		
- * Club domestic league appearances and goals

Anamuah Esme Papa Mends commonly known as Esme Mends (born 22 February 1986) is a Ghanaian footballer who plays for Al-Oruba SC in the Oman Professional League.

== Personal life ==
Esme is the son of Lionel Thompson Mends and Sanatu Mends, both of Rome, Italy and the nephew of Ghana's former permanent representative to the FAO of the UN, Horatio Mends.

== Career ==
Mends began his youth playing career at Great Ambassadors in the Tema Colts League before joining division 1 club, Tema Real Sportive in 2003/4. The club gained promotion to the Ghanaian Premier League in 2004/5 and Esme was named as team captain. .After a total of four years with Real Sportive, Esme left the club and signed with the top clubAccra Hearts of Oak SC making them champions in 2008/2009 for the first time in 8 years. Also Hearts of Oak player of the year 2008/09. Esme was nominated in the Ghana Premier League All Star team 2007, 2008, 2009, 2010. Mends has attracted interest from a number of big Russian, Spanish, German and Italian teams in 2009 and 2010.

On 11 September 2013, Esme signed a one-year contract with Oman-based club Al-Oruba SC.
