= Vinícius (footballer, born 1964) =

Brazilian footballer

Personal information
- Full name: Vinícius Lopes Righi
- Date of birth: 29 February 1964 (age 62)
- Place of birth: Três Rios, Brazil
- Height: 1.75 m (5 ft 9 in)
- Position: Forward

Senior career*
Years	Team	Apps	(Gls)
1983–1986	Flamengo	61	(21)
1986–1992	Braga	128	(35)
1992–1993	Tirsense	27	(5)
1993–1994	Chaves	1	(0)
1994–1995	Leça		
1996	Democrata-GV		
1996	Ypiranga-RS		
1997–1998	Bolívar		
- * Club domestic league appearances and goals

Vinícius Lopes Righi, known as Vinícius (born 29 February 1964) is a Brazilian former professional footballer who played as a forward.

He played seven seasons and 155 games, scoring 40 goals in the Primeira Liga, mostly for Braga and also for Tirsense.

== Club career ==
He made his Primeira Liga debut for Braga on 22 February 1987 as a late substitute in a 0–0 draw against Académica de Coimbra.
