= Oman national football team results (1965–2019) =

The Oman national football team is the national team of Oman that has represented Oman in international competitions since 1978. Although the team was officially founded in 1978, the squad was formed long before, and a proper football association was formed only in December 2005. The team is governed by the Oman Football Association.

== 1990s ==
=== 1999 ===
3 August 1999 AFC Asian Cup qualification	Oman	3–0	Kyrgyzstan	Dushanbe, Tajikistan
	Al-Wahaibi 7'; Al-Habsi 39', 90'			Stadium: Central Stadium; Attendance: 5,000; Referee: Saeed Abdullah Ibrahim (United Arab Emirates)

5 August 1999 AFC Asian Cup qualification	Iraq	2–0	Oman	Dushanbe, Tajikistan
	Farhan 55', 70'			Stadium: Central Stadium

7 August 1999 AFC Asian Cup qualification	Tajikistan	2–1	Oman	Dushanbe, Tajikistan
	Knyazev 21'; Kulbayev 29'		Al-Balushi 43'	Stadium: Central Stadium

19 August 1999 Football at the Pan Arab Games	Syria	1–1	Oman	Jordan
	Afash 11'; Haj Moustafa (red card) 61'		Al-Dhabit 61'

23 August 1999 Football at the Pan Arab Games	Oman	0–3	Iraq	Jordan
			Fawzi 4' 54' (pen.); Farhan 42'	Stadium: Al Hassan Stadium; Attendance: 5,000

25 August 1999 Football at the Pan Arab Games	Lebanon	1–1	Oman	Jordan
	Zein 21'		Sha'baan 50'	Stadium: Al Hassan Stadium; Attendance: 7,000

27 August 1999 Football at the Pan Arab Games	Jordan	2–0	Oman	Amman, Jordan
	Ali 59'; Al-Shboul 78'			Stadium: Amman International Stadium; Attendance: 18,000; Referee: Yousef Al-'Aqaily (Saudi Arabia)

== 2000s ==
=== 2001 ===
30 April 2001 FIFA World Cup qualification	Oman	12–0	Laos	Muscat, Oman
16:00 UTC+04	Al-Dhabit 6', 23' (pen.), 30', 45', 45+1'; Mubarak Al-Siyabi 21'; Al-Mukhaini 39', 44'; Nasser Zayid 62' (pen.); Fawzi Bashir 81', 85'; Al-Araimi 84'	Report		Stadium: Sultan Qaboos Sports Complex; Attendance: 2,000; Referee: Ammar Ammar (Lebanon)

4 May 2001 FIFA World Cup qualification	Oman	7–0	Laos	Muscat, Oman
19:15 UTC+04	Al-Dhabit 15', 79'; Mubarak Al-Siyabi 36'; Al-Araimi 39', 42'; Al-Mukhaini 43'; Samir 90'	Report		Stadium: Sultan Qaboos Sports Complex; Attendance: 2,099; Referee: Gyanu Shrestha (Nepal)

7 May 2001 FIFA World Cup qualification	Oman	7–0	Philippines	Muscat, Oman
19:15 UTC+04	Al-Dhabit 43' (pen.), 81'; Al-Mukhaini 45', 61', 68', 79'; Said 83'	Report		Stadium: Sultan Qaboos Sports Complex; Attendance: 2,200; Referee: Abdul Rahman Al-Delawar (Bahrain)

11 May 2001 FIFA World Cup qualification	Philippines	0–2	Oman	Muscat, Oman
19:15 UTC+04		Report	Al-Mukhaini 11', 56'	Stadium: Sultan Qaboos Sports Complex; Attendance: 3,000; Referee: Sergey Tsaregradskiy (Kazakhstan)

18 May 2001 FIFA World Cup qualification	Syria	3–3	Oman	Aleppo, Syria
16:30 UTC+03	Bayazid 4'; Afash 56'; Srour 68'	Report	Al-Araimi 35'; Al-Dhabit 55'; Samir 81'	Stadium: Al-Hamadaniah Stadium; Attendance: 18,000; Referee: Lu Jun (China)

25 May 2001 FIFA World Cup qualification	Oman	2–0	Syria	Muscat, Oman
19:15 UTC+04	Mubarak Al-Siyabi 48'; Samir 67'	Report		Stadium: Sultan Qaboos Sports Complex; Attendance: 25,000; Referee: Masayoshi Okada (Japan)

16 August 2001 FIFA World Cup qualification	Qatar	0–0	Oman	Doha, Qatar
19:00 UTC+03		Report		Stadium: Khalifa International Stadium; Attendance: 15,000; Referee: Abdulhameed Ebrahim (BHR)

31 August 2001 FIFA World Cup qualification	Oman	0–2	China	Muscat, Oman
19:15 UTC+04		Report	Qi Hong 70'; Fan Zhiyi 84' (pen.)	Stadium: Sultan Qaboos Sports Complex; Attendance: 35,000; Referee: Ahmad Khalidi Supian (MAS)

8 September 2001 FIFA World Cup qualification	Uzbekistan	5–0	Oman	Tashkent, Uzbekistan
19:00 UTC+05	Irismetov 17', 73'; Shatskikh 38' (pen.); Qosimov 50', 67'	Report		Stadium: Pakhtakor Markaziy Stadium; Attendance: 25,000; Referee: Masoud Moradi (IRN)

14 September 2001 FIFA World Cup qualification	Oman	1–1	United Arab Emirates	Muscat, Oman
19:00 UTC+04	Nairooz 52'	Report	Abdulazeez 13'	Stadium: Sultan Qaboos Sports Complex; Attendance: 3,000; Referee: Hassan Marshoud (JOR)

21 September 2001 FIFA World Cup qualification	Oman	0–3	Qatar	Muscat, Oman
19:00 UTC+04		Report	Hamzah 26'; Mustafa 33'; Al Enazi 74'	Stadium: Sultan Qaboos Sports Complex; Attendance: 3,000; Referee: Qasem Shaban (KUW)

7 October 2001 FIFA World Cup qualification	China	1–0	Oman	Shenyang, China
19:30 UTC+08	Yu Genwei 36'	Report		Stadium: Wulihe Stadium; Attendance: 45,000; Referee: Shamsul Maidin (SIN)

13 October 2001 FIFA World Cup qualification	Oman	4–2	Uzbekistan	Muscat, Oman
18:30 UTC+04	Al-Mukhaini 50', 83'; Bashir 52'; Al-Mahrouqi 89'	Report	Davletov 5'; Ashoor 27' (o.g.)	Stadium: Sultan Qaboos Sports Complex; Attendance: 400; Referee: Masayoshi Okada (JPN)

19 October 2001 FIFA World Cup qualification	United Arab Emirates	2–2	Oman	Abu Dhabi, United Arab Emirates
18:30 UTC+04	Ibrahim 45'; Omar 60'	Report	Mubarak 22'; Al-Dhabit 41'	Stadium: Sheikh Zayed Stadium; Attendance: 40,000; Referee: Ali Abdulla Mandani (KUW)

=== 2003 ===
25 September 2003 AFC Asian Cup qualification	Nepal	0–7	Oman	Daegu, South Korea
			Fawzi Bashir 2', 25'; Ahmed Hadid 4', 12'; Hassan Mudhafar 6'; Badar Al-Maimani 51'; Hani Al-Dhabit 59'	Stadium: Daegu World Cup Stadium

27 September 2003 AFC Asian Cup qualification	South Korea	1–0	Oman	Incheon, South Korea
	Choi Sung-Kuk 46'			Stadium: Munhak Stadium; Attendance: 18,750; Referee: Masayoshi Okada (Japan)

29 September 2003 AFC Asian Cup qualification	Oman	6–0	Vietnam	Daegu, South Korea
	Bashir 15', 43'; Al-Dhabit 16', 27'; Al-Mukhaini 20'; Al-Hinai 87'			Stadium: Daegu World Cup Stadium

19 October 2003 AFC Asian Cup qualification	Nepal	0–6	Oman	Muscat, Oman
			Fawzi Bashir 18', 62', 82'; Yousuf Shaaban 20'; Ahmed Hadid 44'; Hashim Saleh 78'

21 October 2003 AFC Asian Cup qualification	Oman	3–1	South Korea	Muscat, Oman
	Al-Dhabit 60'; Hashim Saleh 64'; Fawzi Bashir 88'		Chung Kyung-Ho 49'; Woo Sung-Yong (red card) 91'	Stadium: Sultan Qaboos Sports Complex; Attendance: 22,000

24 October 2003 AFC Asian Cup qualification	Oman	2–0	Vietnam	Muscat, Oman
	Al-Dhabit 47'; Ahmed Hadid 68'

=== 2004 ===
18 February 2004 FIFA World Cup qualification	Japan	1–0	Oman	Saitama, Japan
19:20	Kubo 90+2'	(Report)		Stadium: Saitama Stadium; Attendance: 60,270; Referee: Halim Abdul Hamid (Malaysia)

31 March 2004 FIFA World Cup qualification	India	1–5	Oman	Kochi, India
17:45	Renedy 18'	(Report)	Amad Ali 12'; Ahmed Mubarak 26', 49'; Al-Hinai 60', 88'	Stadium: Jawaharlal Nehru Stadium; Attendance: 48,000; Referee: Danny Kim Heng (Malaysia)

9 June 2004 FIFA World Cup qualification	Oman	7–0	Singapore	Muscat, Oman
19:45	Al-Maimani 9', 44', 64', 86'; Ayil 25', 53'; Al-Mukhaini 39'	(Report)		Stadium: Sultan Qaboos Sports Complex; Attendance: 2,000; Referee: Abdulhameed Ebrahim (Bahrain)

20 July 2004 AFC Asian Cup	Japan	1–0	Oman	Chongqing, China
18:00	Nakamura 33'	Report		Stadium: Chongqing Olympic Sports Center; Attendance: 35,000; Referee: Mark Shield (Australia)

24 July 2004 AFC Asian Cup	Oman	2–2	Iran	Chongqing, China
18:00	Al-Hosni 31', 40'	Report	Karimi 61'; Nosrati 90+4'	Stadium: Chongqing Olympic Sports Center; Attendance: 35,000; Referee: Abdul Rahman Al-Delawar (Bahrain)

28 July 2004 AFC Asian Cup	Oman	2–0	Thailand	Chengdu, China
18:15	Rangsan 15' (o.g.); Al-Hosni 49'	Report		Stadium: Sichuan Longquanyi Stadium; Attendance: 13,000; Referee: Lu Jun (China)

8 September 2004 FIFA World Cup qualification	Singapore	0–2	Oman	Singapore
19:30		(Report)	Shaaban 3'; Ali 82'	Stadium: Jalan Besar Stadium; Attendance: 4,000; Referee: Deshapryia Arambekade (Sri Lanka)

13 October 2004 FIFA World Cup qualification	Oman	0–1	Japan	Muscat, Oman
18:30		(Report)	Suzuki 52'	Stadium: Sultan Qaboos Sports Complex; Attendance: 35,000; Referee: Lu Jun (China PR)

17 November 2004 FIFA World Cup qualification	Oman	0–0	India	Muscat, Oman
18:00		(Report)		Stadium: Sultan Qaboos Sports Complex; Attendance: 2,000; Referee: Mahmoud Nurilddin (Iraq)

=== 2005 ===
24 December 2005 2005 King's Cup	Oman	2–1	North Korea	Phuket, Thailand
19:15 UTC+7				Stadium: Surakul Stadium

26 December 2005 2005 King's Cup	Thailand	1–0	Oman	Phuket, Thailand
18:45 UTC+7				Stadium: Surakul Stadium

28 December 2005 2005 King's Cup	Oman	1–2	Latvia	Phuket, Thailand
16:30 UTC+7				Stadium: Surakul Stadium

=== 2006 ===
22 February 2006 AFC Asian Cup qualification	United Arab Emirates	1–0	Oman	Dubai, United Arab Emirates
19:00	Matar 15'	(Report)		Stadium: Al-Maktoum Stadium; Attendance: 15,000; Referee: Khalil Ibrahim Al Ghamdi (Saudi Arabia)

1 March 2006 AFC Asian Cup qualification	Oman	3–0	Jordan	Muscat, Oman
19:00	Saleh 7'; Sulaiman 18'; Zaher 54'	(Report)		Stadium: Royal Oman Police Stadium; Attendance: 11,000; Referee: Ravshan Irmatov (Uzbekistan)

16 August 2006 AFC Asian Cup qualification	Pakistan	1–4	Oman	Islamabad, Pakistan
19:00	Essa 79' (pen.)	(Report)	Al-Maimani 15' (pen.), 35'; Al Hosni 27'; Sulaiman 90'	Stadium: Jinnah Sports Stadium; Attendance: 4,000; Referee: Mohsen Torky (Iran)

6 September 2006 AFC Asian Cup qualification	Oman	5–0	Pakistan	Muscat, Oman
20:00	Al Hosni 7'; Bashir 35', 85'; Sulaiman 45'; Al-Touqi 88'	(Report)		Stadium: Sultan Qaboos Sports Complex; Attendance: 10,000; Referee: Ala Abdul Kadir Nema (Iraq)

11 October 2006 AFC Asian Cup qualification	Oman	2–1	United Arab Emirates	Muscat, Oman
22:00	Mudhafar 24'; Sulaiman 28'	(Report)	Omer 57'	Stadium: Sultan Qaboos Sports Complex; Attendance: 28,000; Referee: Huang Junjie (China PR)

15 November 2006 AFC Asian Cup qualification	Jordan	3–0	Oman	Amman, Jordan
17:00	Amer Deeb 80'; Ra'fat Ali 84'; Al-Sheikh 90'	(Report)		Stadium: International Stadium; Attendance: 3,000; Referee: Talaat Najm (Lebanon)

=== 2007 ===
17 January 2007 Arabian Gulf Cup	United Arab Emirates	1–2	Oman	Abu Dhabi, United Arab Emirates
	Matar 65'		Bashir 36'; Al-Hosni 52'	Stadium: Zayed Sports City Stadium

20 January 2007 Arabian Gulf Cup	Kuwait	1–2	Oman	Abu Dhabi, United Arab Emirates
	Al-Rashidi 81'		Al-Hosni 8'; Saleh 85'	Stadium: Mohammed bin Zayed Stadium

23 January 2007 Arabian Gulf Cup	Oman	2–1	Yemen	Abu Dhabi, United Arab Emirates
	Al-Touqi 1'; Al Busafy 88'		Saleh 9'	Stadium: Mohammed bin Zayed Stadium

27 January 2007 Arabian Gulf Cup	Oman	1–0	Bahrain	Abu Dhabi, United Arab Emirates
	Al-Maimani 55'			Stadium: Mohammed bin Zayed Stadium

30 January 2007 Arabian Gulf Cup	Oman	0–1	United Arab Emirates	Abu Dhabi, United Arab Emirates
			Matar 72'	Stadium: Zayed Sports City Stadium

8 July 2007 AFC Asian Cup	Australia	1–1	Oman	Bangkok, Thailand
17:15 UTC+7	Cahill 90+2'	Report	Al-Maimani 32'	Stadium: Rajamangala Stadium; Attendance: 5,000; Referee: Eddy Maillet (Seychelles)

12 July 2007 AFC Asian Cup	Oman	0–2	Thailand	Bangkok, Thailand
17:15 UTC+7		Report	Pipat 70', 78'	Stadium: Rajamangala Stadium; Attendance: 19,000; Referee: Lee Gi-Young (South Korea)

16 July 2007 AFC Asian Cup	Oman	0–0	Iraq	Bangkok, Thailand
19:30 UTC+7		Report		Stadium: National Stadium; Attendance: 500; Referee: Eddy Maillet (Seychelles)

8 October 2007 FIFA World Cup qualification	Oman	2–0	Nepal	Muscat, Oman
21:30 UTC+4	Bashir 5'; Mudhafar 21' (pen.)	Report		Stadium: Sultan Qaboos Sports Complex; Attendance: 15,000; Referee: Fareed Al Marzouqi (UAE)

28 October 2007 FIFA World Cup qualification	Nepal	0–2	Oman	Kathmandu, Nepal
14:30 UTC+5:45		Report	Saleh 29'; Al Hinai 54'	Stadium: Dasarath Rangasala Stadium; Attendance: 10,000; Referee: Satop Tongkhan (Thailand)

=== 2008 ===
6 February 2008 FIFA World Cup qualification	Oman	0–1	Bahrain	Muscat, Oman
18:30 UTC+4		Report	Hubail 14'	Stadium: Sultan Qaboos Sports Complex; Attendance: 28,000; Referee: Lee Gi-Young (South Korea)

26 March 2008 FIFA World Cup qualification	Thailand	0–1	Oman	Bangkok, Thailand
18:30 UTC+7		Report	Sulaiman 1'	Stadium: Rajamangala National Stadium; Attendance: 40,000; Referee: Mohsen Torky (Iran)

2 June 2008 FIFA World Cup qualification	Japan	3–0	Oman	Yokohama, Japan
19:20 UTC+9	Nakazawa 10'; Ōkubo 22'; S. Nakamura 49'	Report		Stadium: International Stadium Yokohama; Attendance: 46,764; Referee: Abdul Malik Bashir (Singapore)

7 June 2008 FIFA World Cup qualification	Oman	1–1	Japan	Muscat, Oman
17:15 UTC+4	Ahmed Mubarak 11'	Report	Endō 53' (pen.)	Stadium: Royal Oman Police Stadium; Attendance: 6,500; Referee: Subkhiddin Mohd Salleh (Malaysia)

14 June 2008 FIFA World Cup qualification	Bahrain	1–1	Oman	Riffa, Bahrain
19:30 UTC+3	Aaish 41'	Report	Sulaiman 72'	Stadium: Bahrain National Stadium; Attendance: 25,000; Referee: Saad Al Fadhli (Kuwait)

22 June 2008 FIFA World Cup qualification	Oman	2–1	Thailand	Muscat, Oman
18:00 UTC+4	Al Hosni 58', 85'	Report	Sripan 3' (pen.)	Stadium: Royal Oman Police Stadium; Attendance: 3,000; Referee: Salem Mujghef (Jordan)

=== 2009 ===
4 January 2009 Arabian Gulf Cup	Oman	0–0	Kuwait	Muscat, Oman
				Stadium: Sultan Qaboos Sports Complex

7 January 2009 Arabian Gulf Cup	Iraq	0–4	Oman	Muscat, Oman
			Rabia 23', 65', 79'; Al-Hosni 50'	Stadium: Sultan Qaboos Sports Complex

10 January 2009 Arabian Gulf Cup	Oman	2–0	Bahrain	Muscat, Oman
	Al-Maimani 14'; Bashir 71'			Stadium: Sultan Qaboos Sports Complex

14 January 2009 Arabian Gulf Cup	Oman	1–0	Qatar	Muscat, Oman
18:00 UTC+4	Rabia 18'			Stadium: Sultan Qaboos Sports Complex

17 January 2009 Arabian Gulf Cup	Oman	0–0 (a.e.t.) (6–5 p)	Saudi Arabia	Muscat, Oman
18:00 UTC+4				Stadium: Sultan Qaboos Sports Complex
	Penalties
	Ayil (penalty scored); Al-Ajmi (penalty scored); Mudhafar (penalty scored); Saleh (penalty scored); Bashir (penalty scored); Rabia (penalty scored)		(penalty scored) Al-Qahtani; (penalty scored) Khariri; (penalty scored) Tukar; (penalty scored) Otaif; (penalty scored) Hawsawi; (penalty missed) Al-Jassim

19 January 2009 AFC Asian Cup qualification	Oman	0–0	Indonesia	Muscat, Oman
19:30 UTC+4		Report		Stadium: Sultan Qaboos Sports Complex; Attendance: 13,000; Referee: Tayeb Hasan Shamsuzzaman (Bangladesh)

28 January 2009 AFC Asian Cup qualification	Kuwait	0–1	Oman	Kuwait City, Kuwait
18:00 UTC+3		Report	Rabia 64'	Stadium: Al-Sadaqua Walsalam Stadium; Attendance: 22,000; Referee: Mohamed Omar Al Saeedi (United Arab Emirates)

14 October 2009 AFC Asian Cup qualification	Australia	1–0	Oman	Melbourne, Australia
19:30 UTC+11	Cahill 74'	Report		Stadium: Docklands Stadium; Attendance: 20,595; Referee: Maasaki Toma (Japan)

14 November 2009 AFC Asian Cup qualification	Oman	1–2	Australia	Muscat, Oman
18:00 UTC+4	Ayil 15' (pen.)	Report	Wilkshire 43'; Emerton 82'	Stadium: Sultan Qaboos Sports Complex; Attendance: 12,000; Referee: Sun Baojie (China)

== 2010s ==
=== 2010 ===
6 January 2010 AFC Asian Cup qualification	Indonesia	1–2	Oman	Jakarta, Indonesia
18:30 UTC+7	Boaz 45'	Report	Bashir 32'; Sulaiman 52'	Stadium: Gelora Bung Karno Stadium; Attendance: 45,000; Referee: Subkhiddin Mohd Salleh (Malaysia)

3 March 2010 AFC Asian Cup qualification	Oman	0–0	Kuwait	Muscat, Oman
19:30 UTC+4		Report		Stadium: Sultan Qaboos Sports Complex; Attendance: 27,000; Referee: Masoud Moradi (Iran)

26 September 2010 WAFF Championship	Bahrain	2–0	Oman	Amman, Jordan
15:00 GMT	Abdullatif 63', 67'	Report		Stadium: King Abdullah Stadium; Attendance: 1,000

28 September 2010 WAFF Championship	Oman	2–2	Iran	Amman, Jordan
15:00 GMT	Hadid 40'; Abdul-Karim 45'	Report	Meydavoudi 17'; Teymourian 53'	Stadium: King Abdullah Stadium; Attendance: 4,000; Referee: Ko Hyung-Jin (South Korea)

23 November 2010 Arabian Gulf Cup	Oman	1–1	Bahrain	Aden, Yemen
16:00	Al Hosni 37'		Al Mishkhas 67'	Stadium: May 22 Stadium; Referee: Naser Al Enezi (Kuwait)

26 November 2010 Arabian Gulf Cup	United Arab Emirates	0–0	Oman	Aden, Yemen
16:00				Stadium: May 22 Stadium; Referee: Hamdy Raaban Shaaban (Egypt)

29 November 2010 Arabian Gulf Cup	Oman	0–0	Iraq	Zinjibar, Yemen
19:00				Stadium: Al-Wihda Stadium; Referee: Yasser Younis (Egypt)

=== 2011 ===
23 July 2011 FIFA World Cup qualification	Oman	3–0; Awarded (Note: FIFA awarded Oman a 3–0 win. The match originally ended 2–0 to Oman.)	Myanmar	Muscat, Oman
19:30 UTC+4	Al Hosni 21'; Al Ajmi 79'	Report		Stadium: Seeb Stadium; Attendance: 6,300; Referee: Ali Sabbagh (Lebanon)

28 July 2011 FIFA World Cup qualification	Myanmar	0–2 (Note: Due to a pitch invasion, the match was abandoned after 45+2 minutes with Oman leading 2–0; FIFA confirmed that the result at the time of the interruption of the match is final.)	Oman	Yangon, Myanmar
15:30 UTC+6:30		Report	Al Hosni 22'; Al Mahaijri 39' (pen.)	Stadium: Thuwunna Stadium; Attendance: 30,000; Referee: Ryuji Sato (Japan)

2 September 2011 FIFA World Cup qualification	Oman	0–0	Saudi Arabia	Muscat, Oman
19:00 UTC+4		Report		Stadium: Seeb Stadium; Attendance: 14,000; Referee: Abdulrahman Abdou (Qatar)

6 September 2011 FIFA World Cup qualification	Thailand	3–0	Oman	Bangkok, Thailand
18:00 UTC+7	Sompong 35'; Teerasil 41'; Al-Farsi 90+1' (o.g.)	Report		Stadium: Rajamangala Stadium; Attendance: 19,000; Referee: Kim Dong Jin (Korea Republic)

11 October 2011 FIFA World Cup qualification	Australia	3–0	Oman	Sydney, Australia
19:30 UTC+11	Holman 8'; Kennedy 65'; Jedinak 85'	Report		Stadium: ANZ Stadium; Attendance: 24,732; Referee: Valentin Kovalenko (Uzbekistan)

11 November 2011 FIFA World Cup qualification	Oman	1–0	Australia	Muscat, Oman
18:00 UTC+4	Al-Hosni 18'	Report		Stadium: Sultan Qaboos Sports Complex; Attendance: 4,500; Referee: Ali Abdulnabi (Bahrain)

15 November 2011 FIFA World Cup qualification	Saudi Arabia	0–0	Oman	Riyadh, Saudi Arabia
19:30 UTC+3		Report		Stadium: King Fahd International Stadium; Attendance: 62,740; Referee: Mohsen Torky (Iran)

=== 2012 ===
29 February 2012 FIFA World Cup qualification	Oman	2–0	Thailand	Muscat, Oman
13:30 UTC+4	Al-Hadhri 8'; Al-Muqbali 90+2'	Report		Stadium: Sultan Qaboos Sports Complex; Attendance: 22,000; Referee: Masaaki Toma (Japan)

3 June 2012 FIFA World Cup qualification	Japan	3–0	Oman	Saitama, Japan
19:31 UTC+9	Honda 11'; Maeda 51'; Okazaki 54'	Report		Stadium: Saitama Stadium 2002; Attendance: 63,551; Referee: Ravshan Irmatov (Uzbekistan)

8 June 2012 FIFA World Cup qualification	Oman	0–0	Australia	Muscat, Oman
17:00 UTC+4		Report		Stadium: Sultan Qaboos Sports Complex; Attendance: 11,000; Referee: Alireza Faghani (Iran)

12 June 2012 FIFA World Cup qualification	Iraq	1–1	Oman	Doha, Qatar
17:45 UTC+3	Mahmoud 37' (pen.)	Report	Al Balushi 8'	Stadium: Grand Hamad Stadium; Attendance: 1,650; Referee: Abdulrahman Abdou (Qatar)

16 October 2012 FIFA World Cup qualification	Oman	2–1	Jordan	Muscat, Oman
17:00 UTC+4	Al Mahaijri 62'; Al-Mashri 87'	Report	Bawab 90'	Stadium: Sultan Qaboos Sports Complex; Attendance: 26,000; Referee: Nawaf Shukralla (Bahrain)

14 November 2012 FIFA World Cup qualification	Oman	1–2	Japan	Muscat, Oman
15:30 UTC+4	Al Mahaijri 77'	Report	Kiyotake 20'; Okazaki 90'	Stadium: Sultan Qaboos Sports Complex; Attendance: 28,360; Referee: Abdullah Balideh (Qatar)

8 December 2012 WAFF Championship	Oman	0–1	Lebanon	Al Farwaniyah, Kuwait
19:30		Report	Haidar 11'	Stadium: Ali Al-Salem Al-Sabah Stadium; Attendance: 2,000; Referee: Abdulla Hassan Mohamed (UAE)

11 December 2012 WAFF Championship	Kuwait	0–2	Oman	Kuwait City, Kuwait
17:25		Report	Qasim 36', 45+2'	Stadium: Al-Sadaqua Walsalam Stadium; Attendance: 1,400; Referee: Nasser Al-Ghafari (Jordan)

14 December 2012 WAFF Championship	Oman	2–1	Palestine	Al Farwaniyah, Kuwait
17:25	Al-Seyabi 5'; Qasim 34'	Report	Zatara 40'	Stadium: Ali Al-Salem Al-Sabah Stadium; Attendance: 500; Referee: Minoru Tojo (Japan)

18 December 2012 WAFF Championship	Oman	0–2	Iraq	Al Farwaniyah, Kuwait
17:30		Report	Radhi 6'; Yasin 39'	Stadium: Ali Al-Salem Al-Sabah Stadium; Attendance: 500; Referee: Abdulla Hassan Mohamed (UAE)

20 December 2012 WAFF Championship	Oman	1–0	Bahrain	Al Farwaniyah, Kuwait
16:10	Qasim 68'	Report		Stadium: Ali Al-Salem Al-Sabah Stadium; Attendance: 100; Referee: Banjar Al-Dosari (Qatar)

=== 2013 ===
5 January 2013 Arabian Gulf Cup	Bahrain	0–0	Oman	Riffa, Bahrain
19:15		Report		Stadium: Bahrain National Stadium; Attendance: 35,000; Referee: Ravshan Irmatov (Uzbekistan)

8 January 2013 Arabian Gulf Cup	Qatar	2–1	Oman	Riffa, Bahrain
16:15	Ibrahim 56' (pen.); El-Sayed 88'	Report	Al-Hadhri 71' (pen.)	Stadium: Bahrain National Stadium; Attendance: 5,000; Referee: Mukhtar Al Yarimi (Yemen)

11 January 2013 Arabian Gulf Cup	United Arab Emirates	2–0	Oman	Isa Town, Bahrain
17:45	Khalil 83', 86'	Report		Stadium: Khalifa Sports City Stadium; Attendance: 7,000; Referee: Yousef Al-Marzouq (Kuwait)

6 February 2013 AFC Asian Cup qualification	Oman	1–0	Syria	Muscat, Oman
17:15 UTC+4	Al-Muqbali 39'	Report		Stadium: Sultan Qaboos Sports Complex; Attendance: 15,252; Referee: Tan Hai (China PR)

26 March 2013 FIFA World Cup qualification	Australia	2–2	Oman	Sydney, Australia
19:30 UTC+11	Cahill 52'; Holman 85'	Report	Al-Muqbali 7'; Jedinak 49' (o.g.)	Stadium: Stadium Australia; Attendance: 34,603; Referee: Ravshan Irmatov (Uzbekistan)

4 June 2013 FIFA World Cup qualification	Oman	1–0	Iraq	Muscat, Oman
17:00 UTC+4	Al Ajmi 45+4'	Report		Stadium: Sultan Qaboos Sports Complex; Attendance: 18,300; Referee: Kim Dong-Jin (Korea Republic)

18 June 2013 FIFA World Cup qualification	Jordan	1–0	Oman	Amman, Jordan
19:00 UTC+3	Hayel 58'	Report		Stadium: King Abdullah Stadium; Attendance: 14,000; Referee: Valentin Kovalenko (Uzbekistan)

14 August 2013 AFC Asian Cup qualification	Singapore	0–2	Oman	Singapore
19:30 UTC+8		Report	Said 15'; Al-Farsi 45'	Stadium: Jalan Besar Stadium; Attendance: 5,849; Referee: Masaaki Toma (Japan)

15 October 2013 AFC Asian Cup qualification	Jordan	0–0	Oman	Amman, Jordan
18:00 UTC+3		Report		Stadium: King Abdullah Stadium; Attendance: 6,423; Referee: Nawaf Shukralla (Bahrain)

19 November 2013 AFC Asian Cup qualification	Syria	0–1	Oman	Tehran, Iran
14:00 UTC+3:30		Report	Al-Farsi 90+1'	Stadium: PAS Stadium; Attendance: 200; Referee: Abdulrahman Abdou (Qatar)

25 December 2013 WAFF Championship	Oman	0–0	Bahrain	Doha, Qatar
20:00		Report		Stadium: Al Sadd Stadium; Attendance: 750; Referee: Banjar Al-Dosari (Qatar)

31 December 2013 WAFF Championship	Iraq	0–0	Oman	Doha, Qatar
20:00		Report		Stadium: Al Sadd Stadium; Attendance: 450; Referee: Nagor Amir Noor Mohamed (Malaysia)

=== 2014 ===
31 January 2014 AFC Asian Cup qualification	Oman	0–0	Jordan	Muscat, Oman
18:30 UTC+4		Report		Stadium: Sultan Qaboos Sports Complex; Attendance: 7,000; Referee: Mohamed Al Zarouni (United Arab Emirates)

5 March 2014 AFC Asian Cup qualification	Oman	3–1	Singapore	Muscat, Oman
17:30 UTC+4	Al Hosni 19'; Said 51'; Al-Hasani 69'	Report	Shahril 78'	Stadium: Sultan Qaboos Sports Complex; Attendance: 6,700; Referee: Ko Hyung-Jin (South Korea)

14 November 2014 Arabian Gulf Cup	United Arab Emirates	0–0	Oman	Riyadh, Saudi Arabia
17:45		Report		Stadium: Prince Faisal bin Fahd Stadium; Referee: Marai Al-Awaji (Saudi Arabia)

17 November 2014 Arabian Gulf Cup	Iraq	1–1	Oman	Riyadh, Saudi Arabia
20:15	Kasim 14'	Report	Mubarak 51' (pen.)	Stadium: Prince Faisal bin Fahd Stadium; Referee: Abdullah Balideh (Qatar)

20 November 2014 Arabian Gulf Cup	Kuwait	0–5	Oman	Riyadh, Saudi Arabia
19:45		Report	Al-Muqbali 44', 90'; Al-Ruzaiqi 45+3', 48', 59'	Stadium: Prince Faisal bin Fahd Stadium; Referee: Ben Williams (Australia)

23 November 2014 Arabian Gulf Cup	Oman	1–3	Qatar	Riyadh, Saudi Arabia
17:45	Saleh 24'	Report	Al-Haydos 36' (pen.); Assadalla 59', 67'	Stadium: King Fahd International Stadium; Referee: Marcin Borski (Poland)

25 November 2014 Arabian Gulf Cup	United Arab Emirates	1–0	Oman	Riyadh, Saudi Arabia
17:45	Mabkhout 59'	Report		Stadium: Prince Faisal bin Fahd Stadium; Referee: Abdullah Balideh (Qatar)

=== 2015 ===
10 January 2015 AFC Asian Cup	South Korea	1–0	Oman	Canberra, Australia
16:00 AEDT (UTC+11)	Cho Young-cheol 45+1'	Report		Stadium: Canberra Stadium; Attendance: 12,552; Referee: Peter O'Leary (New Zealand)

13 January 2015 AFC Asian Cup	Oman	0–4	Australia	Sydney, Australia
20:00 AEDT (UTC+11)		Report	McKay 27'; Kruse 30'; Milligan 45+2' (pen.); Juric 70'	Stadium: Stadium Australia; Attendance: 50,276; Referee: Ryuji Sato (Japan)

17 January 2015 AFC Asian Cup	Oman	1–0	Kuwait	Newcastle, Australia
20:00 AEDT (UTC+11)	Al-Muqbali 69'	Report		Stadium: Newcastle Stadium; Attendance: 7,499; Referee: Fahad Al-Mirdasi (Saudi Arabia)

11 June 2015 FIFA World Cup qualification	India	1–2	Oman	Bangalore, India
19:00 UTC+5:30	Chhetri 26'	Report (FIFA); Report (AFC)	Said 1'; Al-Hosni 40' (pen.)	Stadium: Sree Kanteerava Stadium; Attendance: 19,312; Referee: Ko Hyung-jin (South Korea)

3 September 2015 FIFA World Cup qualification	Oman	3–1	Turkmenistan	Seeb, Oman
19:00 UTC+4	Saleh 7'; Saparow 11' (o.g.); Al-Hosni 59'	Report (FIFA); Report (AFC)	Amanow 82'	Stadium: Al-Seeb Stadium; Attendance: 7,500; Referee: Muhammad Taqi Aljaafari Bin Jahari (Singapore)

8 September 2015 FIFA World Cup qualification	Guam	0–0	Oman	Dededo, Guam
16:00 UTC+10		Report (FIFA); Report (AFC)		Stadium: Guam F.A. National Training Center; Attendance: 2,239; Referee: Hiroyuki Kimura (Japan)

8 October 2015 FIFA World Cup qualification	Oman	1–1	Iran	Muscat, Oman
18:30 UTC+4	Al-Mukhaini 52'	Report (FIFA); Report (AFC)	Hosseini 70'	Stadium: Sultan Qaboos Sports Complex; Attendance: 12,400; Referee: Valentin Kovalenko (Uzbekistan)

13 October 2015 FIFA World Cup qualification	Oman	3–0	India	Muscat, Oman
18:30 UTC+4	Mubarak 55'; Al-Muqbali 67', 84'	Report (FIFA); Report (AFC)		Stadium: Sultan Qaboos Sports Complex; Attendance: 11,000; Referee: Fahad Al-Marri (Qatar)

17 November 2015 FIFA World Cup qualification	Turkmenistan	2–1	Oman	Ashgabat, Turkmenistan
18:00 UTC+5	Geworkýan 40'; Muhadow 67'	Report (FIFA); Report (AFC)	Al-Ghassani 70'	Stadium: Köpetdag Stadium; Attendance: 23,100; Referee: Ma Ning (China)

=== 2016 ===
24 March 2016 FIFA World Cup qualification	Oman	1–0	Guam	Muscat, Oman
19:00 UTC+4	Mubarak 53'	Report (FIFA); Report (AFC)		Stadium: Sultan Qaboos Sports Complex; Attendance: 8,000; Referee: Jameel Abdulhusin (Bahrain)

29 March 2016 FIFA World Cup qualification	Iran	2–0	Oman	Tehran, Iran
19:00 UTC+4:30	Azmoun 16', 23'	Report (FIFA); Report (AFC)		Stadium: Azadi Stadium; Attendance: 33,850; Referee: Minoru Tōjō (Japan)

14 November 2016 Friendly	Myanmar	0–3	Oman	Yangon, Myanmar
17:00 UTC+5			Al-Nahar 8'; Q.Said 56'; Al-Khaldi 67'	Stadium: Thuwunna Stadium

=== 2017 ===
28 March 2017 AFC Asian Cup qualification	Oman	14–0	Bhutan	Muscat, Oman
19:00 UTC+4	Al-Muqbali 2', 35', 40', 43', 68', 85'; Al-Mahaijri 25'; Al-Khaldi 30'; Mabrook 44'; Basnet 54' (o.g.); Al-Hajri 70', 74', 90+1' (pen.), 90+2'	Report		Stadium: Sultan Qaboos Sports Complex; Attendance: 4,500; Referee: Hussein Abo Yehia (Lebanon)

13 June 2017 AFC Asian Cup qualification	Palestine	2–1	Oman	Al-Ram, Palestine
23:00 UTC+3	Cantillana 13'; Pinto 21'	Report	Al-Mahaijri 45'	Stadium: Faisal Al-Husseini International Stadium; Attendance: 11,000; Referee: Sivakorn Pu-udom (Thailand)

5 September 2017 AFC Asian Cup qualification	Oman	5–0	Maldives	Muscat, Oman
19:15 UTC+4	Al-Khaldi 5'; Al-Hajri 58'; Al-Yahyaei 69'; Al-Yahmadi 86'; Al-Hasani 88'	Report		Stadium: Sultan Qaboos Sports Complex; Attendance: 1,136; Referee: Võ Minh Trí (Vietnam)

10 October 2017 AFC Asian Cup qualification	Maldives	1–3	Oman	Malé, Maldives
21:00 UTC+5	Fasir 24'	Report	Al-Hajri 15'; Ali 19' (o.g.); Al-Mahaijri 57'	Stadium: National Football Stadium; Attendance: 2,884; Referee: Jarred Gillett (Australia)

14 November 2017 AFC Asian Cup qualification	Bhutan	2–4	Oman	Thimphu, Bhutan
18:00 UTC+6	Tshering 59'; Gyeltshen 90+3'	Report	Al-Hasani 48'; Ibrahim 76'; Al-Hajri 86'; Al-Ruzaiqi 89'	Stadium: Changlimithang Stadium; Attendance: 3,100; Referee: Nagor Amir Noor Mohamed (Malaysia)

22 December 2017 Arabian Gulf Cup	Oman	0–1	United Arab Emirates	Kuwait City, Kuwait
21:00		Report	Mabkhout 28' (pen.)	Stadium: Jaber International Stadium; Referee: Ali Sabah (Iraq)

25 December 2017 Arabian Gulf Cup	Kuwait	0–1	Oman	Kuwait City, Kuwait
20:00		Report	Al-Mahaijri 58' (pen.)	Stadium: Jaber International Stadium; Referee: Saoud Al-Athbah (Qatar)

28 December 2017 Arabian Gulf Cup	Saudi Arabia	0–2	Oman	Kuwait City, Kuwait
18:30		Report	Al-Ruzaiqi 58', 77'	Stadium: Al Kuwait Sports Club Stadium; Referee: Hettikamkanamge Perera (Sri Lanka)

=== 2018 ===
2 January 2018 Arabian Gulf Cup	Oman	1–0	Bahrain	Kuwait City, Kuwait
17:15	Abduljabbar 29' (o.g.)	Report		Stadium: Jaber International Stadium; Referee: Hettikamkanamge Perera (Sri Lanka)

5 January 2018 Arabian Gulf Cup	Oman	0–0 (a.e.t.) (5–4 p)	United Arab Emirates	Kuwait City, Kuwait
17:30		Report		Stadium: Jaber International Stadium; Referee: Ali Shaban (Kuwait)
	Penalties
	Al-Muqbali (penalty scored); Al-Mukhaini (penalty scored); Al-Mahaijri (penalty scored); Al-Ruzaiqi (penalty scored); Al-Khaldi (penalty scored)		(penalty scored) Mabkhout; (penalty scored) Barman; (penalty scored) Ismail; (penalty scored) Barqesh; (penalty missed) Abdulrahman

27 March 2018 AFC Asian Cup qualification	Oman	1–0	Palestine	Muscat, Oman
19:00 UTC+4	Al-Hajri 87'	Report		Stadium: Sultan Qaboos Sports Complex; Attendance: 9,700; Referee: Turki Al-Khudhayr (Saudi Arabia)

13 October 2018 Friendly	Philippines	1–1	Oman	Al Rayyan, Qatar
18:30 UTC+3	Al-Hajri 38' (o.g.)	Report	Saleh 8'	Stadium: Thani bin Jassim Stadium; Referee: Khamis Al Marri (Qatar)

16 October 2018 Friendly	Oman	0–0	Ecuador	Doha, Qatar
18:30 (UTC+3)		Report		Stadium: Abdullah bin Khalifa Stadium; Referee: Abdulla Al Marri (Qatar)

16 November 2018 Friendly	Oman	1–1	Syria	Muscat, Oman
18:30 UTC+4	Al-Khaldi 30'	Report	Kalfa 45'	Stadium: Sultan Qaboos Sports Complex; Referee: Khamis Mohamed Al Kuwari (Qatar)

19 November 2018 Friendly	Oman	2–1	Bahrain	Muscat, Oman
17:30 (UTC+4)	E. Al-Farsi 56'; Al-Yahmadi 90'	Report	Al-Humaidan 68'	Stadium: Sultan Qaboos Sports Complex; Referee: Hussein Abo Yehia (Lebanon)

13 December 2018 Friendly	Oman	2–1	Tajikistan	Muscat, Oman
18:30 (UTC+4)	Al-Ghassani 74'; Abd Raboh 76'	Report	Solehov 90'	Stadium: Sultan Qaboos Sports Complex; Attendance: 1,500; Referee: Mohammad Arafah (Jordan)

16 December 2018 Friendly	Oman	1–0	Tajikistan	Muscat, Oman
18:30 (UTC+4)	Al Hajri 58'	Report		Stadium: Sultan Qaboos Sports Complex; Referee: Ahmed El Sayed (Egypt)

27 December 2018 Friendly	Oman	0–0	India	Abu Dhabi, United Arab Emirates
		Report		Stadium: Baniyas Stadium

30 December 2018 Friendly	Australia	5–0	Oman	Dubai, United Arab Emirates
16:00 GST (UTC+4)	Nabbout 10'; Ikonomidis 14'; Mabil 24'; Degenek 58'; Irvine 89'	Report		Stadium: Maktoum bin Rashid Al Maktoum Stadium; Attendance: 0 (behind closed doors)

=== 2019 ===
2 January 2019 Friendly	Oman	2–0	Thailand	Abu Dhabi, United Arab Emirates
18:00 UTC+4	Mubarak 25' (pen.); Al-Ghassani 55'	Report		Stadium: Sheikh Zayed Cricket Stadium

9 January 2019 AFC Asian Cup	Uzbekistan	2–1	Oman	Sharjah, United Arab Emirates
17:30	Ahmedov 34'; Shomurodov 85'	Report	Mu. Al-Ghassani 72'	Stadium: Sharjah Stadium; Attendance: 9,424; Referee: Ko Hyung-jin (South Korea)

13 January 2019 AFC Asian Cup	Oman	0–1	Japan	Abu Dhabi, United Arab Emirates
17:30		Report	Haraguchi 28' (pen.)	Stadium: Zayed Sports City Stadium; Attendance: 12,110; Referee: Mohd Amirul Izwan Yaacob (Malaysia)

17 January 2019 AFC Asian Cup	Oman	3–1	Turkmenistan	Abu Dhabi, United Arab Emirates
17:30	Kano 20'; Mu. Al-Ghassani 84'; Al-Musalami 90+3'	Report	Annadurdyýew 41'	Stadium: Mohammed bin Zayed Stadium; Attendance: 8,338; Referee: Nawaf Shukralla (Bahrain)

20 January 2019 AFC Asian Cup	Iran	2–0	Oman	Abu Dhabi, United Arab Emirates
21:00	Jahanbakhsh 32'; Dejagah 41' (pen.)	Report		Stadium: Mohammed bin Zayed Stadium; Attendance: 31,945; Referee: César Arturo Ramos (Mexico)

20 March 2019 2019 Airmarine Cup	Oman	5–0	Afghanistan	Kuala Lumpur, Malaysia
16:30 UTC+8	Al-Mahaijri 9'; Saleh 26'; Al-Balushi 45+2'; Al-Muqbali 49'; Al-Khaldi 90+3'	Report (WF); Report (FSA)		Stadium: Bukit Jalil National Stadium; Referee: Nazmi Nasaruddin (Malaysia)

23 March 2019 2019 Airmarine Cup	Oman	1–1 (5–4 p)	Singapore	Kuala Lumpur, Malaysia
20:45 UTC+8	Al-Muqbali 22'	Report (WF); Report (FSA)	Zulfahmi 90+3'	Stadium: Bukit Jalil National Stadium; Referee: Suhaizi Shukri (Malaysia)
	Penalties
	Al-Muqbali (penalty scored); Al-Mahaijri (penalty scored); Al-Musalami (penalty scored); Khasib (penalty scored); Saleh (penalty scored)		(penalty scored) Safuwan; (penalty scored) Yasir; (penalty scored) Amirul; (penalty missed) Faris; (penalty scored) Hariss

28 August 2019 Friendly	Oman	1–0	Yemen	Muscat, Oman
17:30 (UTC+4)	Al-Mahaijri 88'			Stadium: Sultan Qaboos Sports Complex

5 September 2019 2022 FWCQ	India	1–2	Oman	Guwahati, India
19:00 UTC+5:30	Chhetri 24'	Report (FIFA); Report (AFC)	Al-Alawi 82', 90'	Stadium: Indira Gandhi Athletic Stadium; Attendance: 22,798; Referee: Mooud Bonyadifar (Iran)

10 September 2019 Friendly	Oman	1–0	Lebanon	Muscat, Oman
19:30 UTC+4	Al-Ghassani 55'	Report		Stadium: Sultan Qaboos Sports Complex

10 October 2019 2022 FWCQ	Oman	3–0	Afghanistan	Muscat, Oman
18:30 UTC+4	Al-Muqbali 26', 38'; Al-Ghassani 61' (pen.)	Report (FIFA); Report (AFC)		Stadium: Sultan Qaboos Sports Complex; Attendance: 10,000; Referee: Ahmed Al-Ali (Jordan)

15 October 2019 2022 FWCQ	Qatar	2–1	Oman	Doha, Qatar
19:30 UTC+3	Ak. Afif 2'; Ali 71'	Report (FIFA); Report (AFC)	R. Al-Alawi 63'	Stadium: Jassim bin Hamad Stadium; Attendance: 26,731; Referee: Fu Ming (China)

14 November 2019 2022 FWCQ	Oman	4–1	Bangladesh	Muscat, Oman
19:00 UTC+4	Al-Khaldi 48'; R. Al-Alawi 68'; A. Al-Alawi 78'; Al-Hidi 90+1'	Report (FIFA); Report (AFC)	Ahmed 81'	Stadium: Sultan Qaboos Sports Complex; Attendance: 24,000; Referee: Hanna Hattab (Syria)

19 November 2019 2022 FWCQ	Oman	1–0	India	Muscat, Oman
19:00 UTC+4	Al-Ghassani 33'	Report (FIFA); Report (AFC)		Stadium: Sultan Qaboos Sports Complex; Attendance: 24,250; Referee: Nivon Robesh Gamini (Sri Lanka)

27 November 2019 24th AGC	Oman	0–0	Bahrain	Doha, Qatar
17:30 UTC+3		Report		Stadium: Abdullah bin Khalifa Stadium; Referee: Alexandre Boucaut (Belgium)

30 November 2019 24th AGC	Kuwait	1–2	Oman	Doha, Qatar
17:30 UTC+3	Nasser 79'	Report	Al-Muqbali 16' (pen.), 32' (pen.)	Stadium: Abdullah bin Khalifa Stadium; Referee: Khamis Al Marri (Qatar)

2 December 2019 24th AGC	Oman	1–3	Saudi Arabia	Doha, Qatar
20:00 UTC+3	Al-Alawi 55'	Report	Al-Buraikan 26'; Bahebri 42', 57'	Stadium: Abdullah bin Khalifa Stadium; Referee: Alexandre Boucaut (Belgium)

== Head-to-head records ==
Oman national football team head-to-head records (1999–2019)
Opponent	Pld	W	D	L	GF	GA	GD	Pts	Confederation
Afghanistan	2	2	0	0	8	0	+8	6	AFC
Australia	9	1	3	5	5	18	–13	6	AFC
Bahrain	12	5	5	2	9	6	+3	20	AFC
Bangladesh	1	1	0	0	4	1	+3	3	AFC
Bhutan	2	2	0	0	18	2	+16	6	AFC
China	2	0	0	2	0	3	–3	0	AFC
Ecuador	1	0	1	0	0	0	0	1	CONMEBOL
Guam	2	1	1	0	1	0	+1	4	AFC
India	7	5	2	0	13	3	+10	17	AFC
Indonesia	2	1	1	0	2	1	+1	4	AFC
Iran	5	0	3	2	5	8	–3	3	AFC
Iraq	9	2	4	3	7	9	–2	10	AFC
Japan	8	0	1	7	2	13	–11	1	AFC
Jordan	7	2	2	3	5	7	–2	8	AFC
Kuwait	9	7	2	0	14	2	+12	23	AFC
Kyrgyzstan	1	1	0	0	3	0	+3	3	AFC
Laos	2	2	0	0	19	0	+19	6	AFC
Latvia	1	0	0	1	1	2	–1	0	UEFA
Lebanon	3	1	1	1	2	2	0	4	AFC
Maldives	2	2	0	0	8	1	+7	6	AFC
Myanmar	3	3	0	0	8	0	+8	9	AFC
Nepal	4	4	0	0	17	0	+17	12	AFC
North Korea	1	1	0	0	2	1	+1	3	AFC
Pakistan	2	2	0	0	9	1	+8	6	AFC
Palestine	3	2	0	1	4	3	+1	6	AFC
Philippines	3	2	1	0	10	1	+9	7	AFC
Qatar	6	1	1	4	4	10	–6	4	AFC
Saudi Arabia	5	1	3	1	3	3	0	6	AFC
Singapore	5	4	1	0	15	2	+13	13	AFC
South Korea	3	1	0	2	3	3	0	3	AFC
Syria	6	3	3	0	9	5	+4	12	AFC
Tajikistan	3	2	0	1	4	3	+1	6	AFC
Thailand	8	5	0	3	9	7	+2	15	AFC
Turkmenistan	3	2	0	1	7	4	+3	6	AFC
United Arab Emirates	12	2	5	5	8	11	–3	11	AFC
Uzbekistan	3	1	0	2	5	9	–4	3	AFC
Vietnam	2	2	0	0	8	0	+8	6	AFC
Yemen	2	2	0	0	3	1	+2	6	AFC
Total	161	75	40	46	254	142	+112	265	
