= Mohammed Al-Balushi =

Omani footballer (born 1989)

Mohammed al-Balushi
Personal information
- Full name: Mohammed Abdullah Mubarak Al-Balushi
- Date of birth: 27 August 1989 (age 37)
- Place of birth: Oman
- Height: 1.83 m (6 ft 0 in)
- Position: Centre-back

Team information
- Current team: Al-Nahda
- Number: 5

Senior career*
Years	Team	Apps	(Gls)
2006–2008	Al-Nahda	89	(5)
2008	Al Ahly Tripoli	37	(6)
2008–2009	Al-Arabi	40	(4)
2009–2012	Al-Wasl	80	(5)
2011–2012	Al-Wahda	23	(3)
2013– 2014	Al-Nahda	30	(3)
2015– 2016	Al-Suwaiq	24	(0)
2016–	Al-Nahda		

International career^{‡}
2006–2019	Oman	65	(3)
- * Club domestic league appearances and goals ‡ National team caps and goals as of 20 March 2019

Mohammed Abdullah Mubarak al-Balushi (Arabic: مُحَمَّد عَبْد الله مُبَارَك الْبَلُوشِيّ; born 27 August 1989), commonly known as Mohammed al-Sheiba (Arabic: مُحَمَّد الشَّيْبَة), is an Omani footballer who plays for Al-Nahda.

== Career ==
Mohammed Al-Balushi is the first Omani player to play professionally in Africa when he was loaned in 2008 to Al-Ahly (Tripoli) of Libya. He then moved to Al-Arabi SC where he played for a full season and displayed a great performance with the club and with the Oman national football team. His solid defensive abilities plus the gift to score goals made him a target to a number of international clubs such as AJ Auxerre and some regional giants such as Al-Shabab (Saudi Arabia).

But on 22 July 2009, Al-Wasl FC of the UAE won the race and signed the gifted Omani footballer for a season long loan. Before the end of the season, "Al Shaiba" proved his worth, and accepted a four-year contract from Al-Wasl FC. On 29 December 2013, Sheiba signed for his first club Al-Nahda Club for a period of 6 months.

=== Club career statistics ===
Club	Season	Division	League		Cup		Continental		Other (Note: Includes goal in the Club Friendlies)		Total	
Club	Season	Division	Apps	Goals	Apps	Goals	Apps	Goals	Apps	Goals	Apps	Goals
Al-Nahda	2007–08	Omani League	-	2	-	0	0	0	-	0	-	2
Al-Nahda	Total		-	2	-	0	0	0	-	0	-	2
Al-Wasl	2009–10	UAE Pro-League	-	1	-	0	0	0	-	1	-	2
Al-Wasl	2010–11	UAE Pro-League	17	1	0	0	0	0	0	0	17	1
Al-Wasl	2011–12	UAE Pro-League	0	0	1	0	0	0	0	0	1	0
Al-Wasl	Total		-	2	-	0	0	0	-	1	-	3
Al-Wahda	2011–12	UAE Pro-League	15	0	3	1	0	0	0	0	18	1
Al-Wahda	Total		15	0	3	1	0	0	0	0	18	1
Al-Nahda	2013–14	Oman Professional League	-	3	-	2	0	0	-	0	-	5
Al-Nahda	Total		-	3	-	2	0	0	-	0	-	5
Career total			-	7	-	3	0	0	-	1	-	11

== International career ==
=== Arabian Gulf Cup ===
Mohammed has made appearances in the 19th Arabian Gulf Cup, the 20th Arabian Gulf Cup and has represented the national team in the 21st Arabian Gulf Cup.

=== AFC Asian Cup Qualification ===
Mohammed has made appearances in the 2011 AFC Asian Cup qualification and the 2015 AFC Asian Cup qualification.

=== FIFA World Cup Qualification ===
Mohammed has made four appearances in the 2010 FIFA World Cup qualification and eleven in the 2014 FIFA World Cup qualification.

In the 2014 FIFA World Cup qualification, he scored one goal in the fourth round in a 1–1 draw against Iraq. Oman entered the last game of group play with a chance to qualify for at least the playoff-round, but a 1–0 loss to Jordan eliminated them from contention.

== National team career statistics ==
=== Goals for Senior National Team ===
Scores and results list Oman's goal tally first.

#	Date	Venue	Opponent	Score	Result	Competition
1.	28 March 2009	Seeb Stadium, Seeb, Oman	Senegal	1–0	2–0	Friendly
2.	12 June 2012	Grand Hamad Stadium, Doha, Qatar	Iraq	1–0	1–1	2014 FIFA World Cup Qualification
3.	20 March 2019	Bukit Jalil National Stadium, Kuala Lumpur, Malaysia	Afghanistan	3–0	5–0	2019 Airmarine Cup

== Honours ==
Al-Arabi

- Sheikh Jassem Cup: 2008

Al-Wasl

- GCC Champions League: 2009

Al-Wahda

- UAE Super Cup: 2011

Al-Nahda

- Oman Professional League: 2013–14
- Sultan Qaboos Cup runner-up: 2013
