= Musa Haroon =

Qatari footballer (born 1986)

Personal information
- Full name: Musa Haroon Jama
- Date of birth: September 13, 1986 (age 40)
- Place of birth: Doha, Qatar
- Height: 1.85 m (6 ft 1 in)
- Position: Center back

Senior career*
Years	Team	Apps	(Gls)
2004–2011	Al-Arabi	29	(8)
2004–2005	→ Al-Shamal (loan)		
2011–2012	Umm-Salal	16	(0)
2012–2019	Al-Rayyan	98	(5)
2019–2020	Qatar	8	(0)

International career^{‡}
2008–2017	Qatar	7	(2)
- * Club domestic league appearances and goals as of June 28, 2012 ‡ National team caps and goals as of December 24, 2009

Musa Haroon Jama (born September 13, 1986), also known as Musa Haroon, is a Qatari footballer. He currently plays as a defender . He is a member of the Qatar national football team.

== Goals for Senior National Team ==
#	Date	Venue	Opponent	Score	Result	Competition
	11/01/2009	Muscat, Oman	Yemen	2-1	Won	19th Arabian Gulf Cup
	11/10/2009	Tetovo, Macedonia	Macedonia	2-1	Lost	Friendly
