= 2019 Airmarine Cup =

2019 AIRMARINE Cup
Tournament details
- Host country: Malaysia
- City: Kuala Lumpur
- Dates: 20 – 23 March 2019
- Teams: 4 (from 1 confederation)
- Venue: 1 (in 1 host city)

Final positions
- Champions: Oman (1st title)
- Runners-up: Singapore
- Third place: Malaysia
- Fourth place: Afghanistan

Tournament statistics
- Matches played: 4
- Goals scored: 11 (2.75 per match)
- Top scorer(s): (Oman) Abdul Aziz Al-Muqbali (2 goals)

The AIRMARINE Cup 2019 is the first edition of the AIRMARINE Cup, an international football tournament with four countries participating. It is played on 20 and 23 March 2019 in Kuala Lumpur, Malaysia. Ananth S. Nathan, Executive Chairman of AIRMARINE (Malaysia) Sdn. Bhd. takes the tournament as a national social responsibility of a corporate entity to step forward for the Malaysian national football team to gain more international break for the exposure and to advance in their FIFA ranking points.

Faiz Nasir, made his first international goal debut in the Malaysia versus Afghanistan.

Oman won the tournament after beating Singapore 5–4 through penalty shoot-out for their first title.

== Participating nations ==
In earlier February 2019, it was announced that Oman, Singapore and Solomon Islands had been invited to participate in the 2019 Airmarine Cup hosted by the Football Association of Malaysia (FAM). On 1 March 2019, Solomon Islands announcing their withdrawal as the tournament date is coinciding with their league schedule, leading FAM to calling Afghanistan as a potential replacement candidate. The same day, Afghanistan confirmed their participation and the draw are being announced on 4 March.

Participating teams	FIFA Rankings (as of February 2019)
Oman	90
Afghanistan (replacing Solomon Islands)	147 (143)
Singapore	165
Malaysia (host)	167

== Match officials ==
The following referees and their assistants were chosen for the tournament.

Referees

- (Indonesia) Yudi Nurcahya
- (Malaysia) Nazmi Nasaruddin
- (Malaysia) Suhaizi Shukri
- (Thailand) Chaireag Ngamsom

Assistant referees

- (Malaysia) Hariff Akhir
- (Malaysia) Shahreen Che Omar
- (Thailand) Apichit Nophuan
- (Thailand) Poonsawat Samransuk

== Matches ==
All times are local, Malaysian Standard Time (MST) (UTC+8).

=== Bracket ===
Semi-finals
20 March – Kuala Lumpur
Oman	5
Afghanistan	0
20 March – Kuala Lumpur
Malaysia	0
Singapore	1

Final
23 March – Kuala Lumpur
Oman (p)	1 (5)
Singapore	1 (4)
Third-place playoff
23 March – Kuala Lumpur
Afghanistan	1
Malaysia	2

=== Semi-finals ===
20 March 2019
16:30

Oman	5–0	Afghanistan
Al-Mahaijri 9'; Saleh 26'; Al-Balushi 45+2'; Al-Muqbali 49'; Akaak 90+3'	Report (WF); Report (FSA)

Bukit Jalil National Stadium, Kuala Lumpur
Referee: Nazmi Nasaruddin (Malaysia)
20 March 2019
20:45

Malaysia	0–1	Singapore
	Report (WF); Report (FSA)	Faris 82'

Bukit Jalil National Stadium, Kuala Lumpur
Referee: Yudi Nurcahya (Indonesia)

=== Third-place playoff ===
23 March 2019
16:30

Afghanistan	1–2	Malaysia
Shayesteh 32'	Report (WF); Report (FSA)	Faiz 44'; Alikhil 84' (o.g.)

Bukit Jalil National Stadium, Kuala Lumpur
Referee: Chaireag Ngamsom (Thailand)

=== Final ===
23 March 2019
20:45

Oman	1–1	Singapore
Al-Muqbali 22'	Report (WF); Report (FSA)	Zulfahmi 90+3'
Penalties
Al-Muqbali (penalty scored); Al-Mahaijri (penalty scored); Al-Musalami (penalty scored); Khasib (penalty scored); Saleh (penalty scored)	5–4	(penalty scored) Safuwan; (penalty scored) Yasir; (penalty scored) Amirul; (penalty missed) Faris; (penalty scored) Hariss

Bukit Jalil National Stadium, Kuala Lumpur
Referee: Suhaizi Shukri (Malaysia)

2019 Airmarine Cup
(Oman)
Oman
1st title

== Goalscorers ==
2 goals

- (Oman) Abdul Aziz Al-Muqbali

1 goal

- (Afghanistan) Faysal Shayesteh
- (Malaysia) Faiz Nasir
- (Oman) Musallam Akaak
- (Oman) Mohammed Al-Balushi
- (Oman) Ahmed Mubarak Al-Mahaijri
- (Oman) Raed Ibrahim Saleh
- (Singapore) Faris Ramli
- (Singapore) Zulfahmi Arifin

1 own goal

- (Afghanistan) Abassin Alikhil (playing against Malaysia)
