= Zulfahmi Arifin =

Singaporean professional footballer (born 1991)

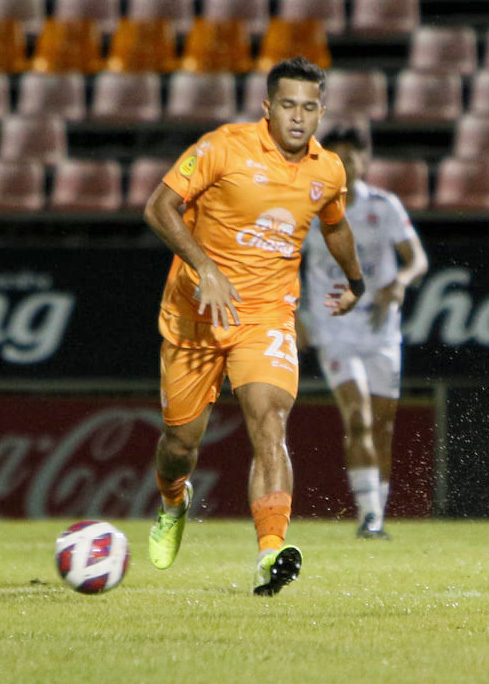
- Zulfahmi Arifin playing for Thai League 2 club, Sukhothai on 23 October 2021

Personal information
- Full name: Muhammad Zulfahmi bin Mohd Arifin
- Date of birth: 5 October 1991 (age 35)
- Place of birth: Singapore
- Height: 1.79 m (5 ft 10 in)
- Position: Defensive midfielder

Team information
- Current team: Star City
- Number: 29

Youth career
- –2009: National Football Academy

Senior career*
| Years | Team | Apps | (Gls) |
| 2010–2012 | Young Lions | 46 | (1) |
| 2013–2015 | LionsXII | 12 | (1) |
| 2016 | Home United | 20 | (1) |
| 2017 | Hougang United | 21 | (0) |
| 2017–2018 | Chonburi | 15 | (0) |
| 2019–2021 | Hougang United | 20 | (1) |
| 2020 | → Suphanburi (loan) | 8 | (0) |
| 2020–2021 | → Samut Prakan City (loan) | 7 | (0) |
| 2021–2022 | Sukhothai | 8 | (1) |
| 2022–2023 | Hougang United | 35 | (1) |
| 2023–2024 | Bhayangkara | 15 | (0) |
| 2024–2025 | Hougang United | 10 | (1) |
| 2025–2026 | Persis Solo | 6 | (0) |
| 2026 | → Immigration (loan) | 9 | (0) |
| 2026– | Star City | 0 | (0) |

International career^{‡}
| 2013 | Singapore U23 | 7 | (0) |
| 2022 | Singapore SEA Games | 2 | (0) |
| 2011– | Singapore | 66 | (1) |
Medal record
Men's football
Representing Singapore
Asean Football Championship
| Winner | AFF Suzuki Cup 2012 | 2012 |
- * Club domestic league appearances and goals as of 16 May 2026 ‡ National team caps and goals as of 26 March 2024

Muhammad Zulfahmi bin Mohd Arifin (born 5 October 1991) is a Singaporean professional footballer who plays as a defensive midfielder for Malaysia Super League club Star City and the Singapore national team. He is known for technical abilities with set-pieces, playmaking abilities and long range efforts. Primarily a defensive midfielder, Zulfahmi's versatility also allows him to play as a central midfielder, centre-back, and occasionally an attacking midfielder.

== Club career ==
=== Young Lions ===
Zulfahmi began his footballing career with Young Lions in the S.League. After two seasons with the club, he was selected in the LionsXII squad for the 2013 season of the Malaysia Super League.

=== LionsXII ===
Zulfahmi failed to play any part in the first 6 games of the season. He was given his first start against Pahang in the MSL on 16 February 2013. Two more appearances followed until a road traffic accident in mid-April set him back a month. He managed one further start and a substitute appearance on his return as LionsXII won the 2013 Malaysia Super League.

Zulfahmi's potential was recognised as he had a run of six starts in the beginning of the 2014 campaign. Poor performances however meant that he was dropped to the bench in favour of Firdaus Kasman for the next three games. He marked his return to the starting line-up on 22 March by curling a free kick into the PKNS net to score his first LionsXII goal.

=== Home United ===
After LionsXII was disbanded, Zulfahmi went to sign for Home United for the 2016 S.League. He made 17 appearances for the protectors before leaving the club at the end of the season.

=== Hougang United ===
Zulfahmi signed for the Cheetahs ahead of the 2017 Singapore Premier League season, joining former coach Phillipe Aw.

=== Chonburi ===
Zulfahmi's journey to Thailand happened after he made contacts with a Thai agent. Zulfahmi was on trial with second-tier club Angthong who had wanted to start negotiations after a day. However, Zulfahmi, on the advice of his agent, traveled to Chonburi instead for a 4-day trial. After playing 60 minutes in a 2–3 friendly defeat to Port, Chonburi offered him a contract which is only slightly higher than what he received at Hougang.

Zulfahmi became only the third Lion to play in the Thai top tier, after Hassan Sunny and John Wilkinson. Zulfahmi made his debut in a 1–0 loss to Chiangrai United. He has started Chonburi's first two games of the Thai League 1, helping them to a draw and a loss.

=== Returned to Hougang United ===
After spending a season with Chonburi, Zulfahmi re-signed for Hougang United for the 2019 Singapore Premier League season.

==== Loan to Suphanburi ====
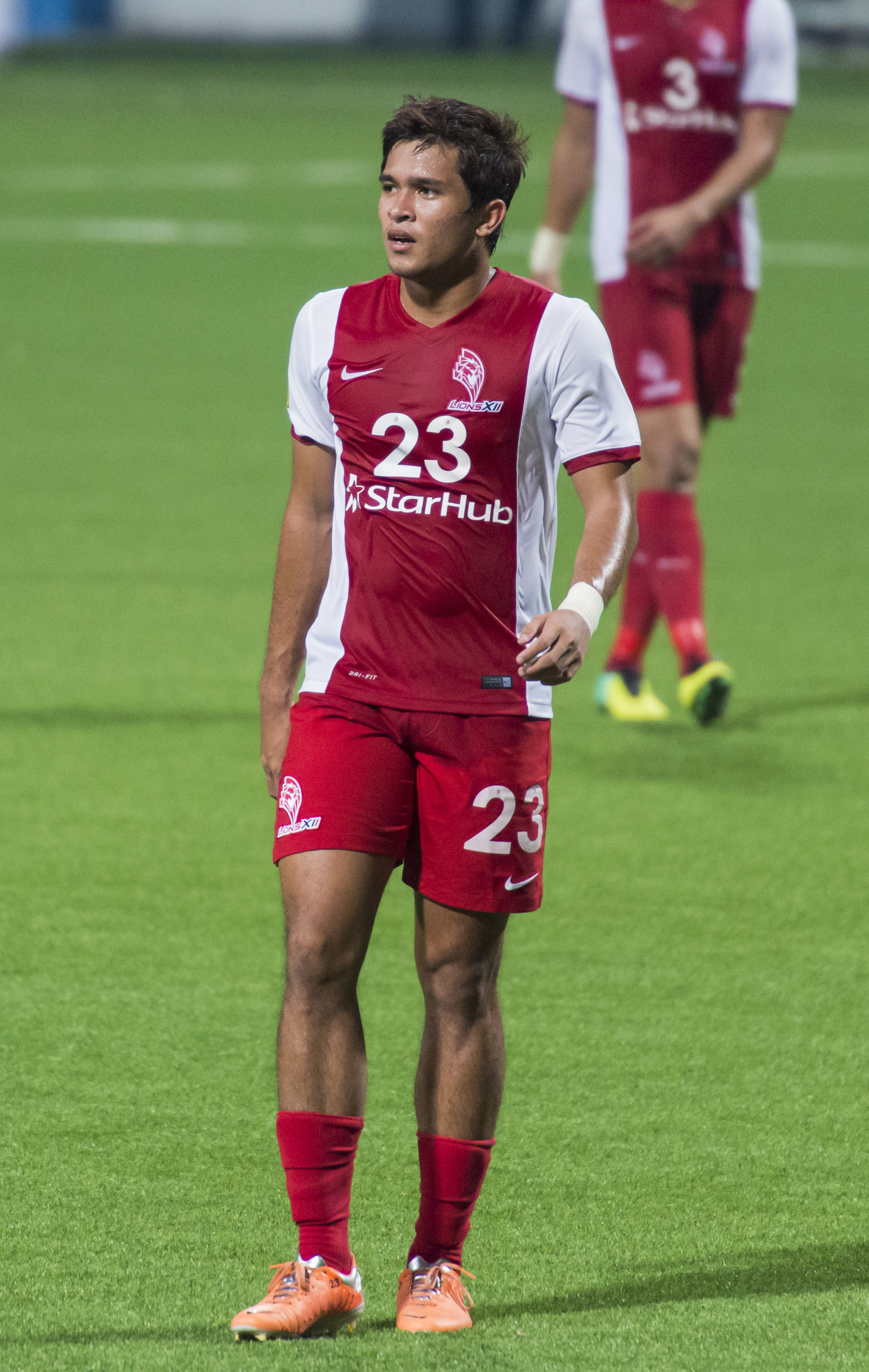
Zulfahmi playing for LionsXII in the 2014 Malaysia Super League match against Kelantan FA

After a year back in his native Singapore, helping Hougang to a 3rd-place finish, Zulfahmi found himself back in the Thai League 1 after an agent contacted him about Suphanburi's interest. Suphanburi's coach Adebayo Gbadebo had watched videos of Zulfahmi's previous games before expressing an interest in signing him. Zulfahmi suffered a difficult 2020, playing just 8 of Suphanburi's 15 league matches in a disrupted season, having returned to Singapore in August to be with his ailing mother, who later died from breast cancer. However, he was a fixture of Suphanburi's midfield before and after he returned to Singapore. He started their first four matches before the league's coronavirus-enforced hiatus and, following his return to Thailand, he started three of Suphanburi's last four league games and came off the bench in the other one.

==== Loan to Samut Prakan City ====
Zulfahmi signed a 1 1/2-season deal with top-tier Thai team Samut Prakan City, after his contract with Thai League 1 side, Suphanburi expired. He will play alongside his international teammate, goalkeeper Izwan Mahbud, who joined the club in September.

=== Sukhothai ===
On 9 September 2021, Zulfahmi left his parent club, Hougang United to joined Thai League 2 club, Sukhothai which will be his fourth Thai League club. However, Zulfahmi has to serve a 14 days quarantine period. He is the 5th Singaporean player to play overseas in 2021. He make his debut for the club on 25 September 2021 against Chainat Hornbill which resulted in a 2–2 draw. On 17 November 2021, He scored his first goal for the club against Rajpracha in a 4–2 win.

=== Third spell at Hougang United ===
On 15 February 2022, Zulfahmi rejoins Hougang United for the 2022 Singapore Premier League season. On 27 February 2022, he make his league return appearances after two years against Lion City Sailors. In his first season back at the club, he helped the club to capture their first ever piece of silverware in the club history winning the 2022 Singapore Cup Final against Tampines Rovers. Zulfahmi was named the club captain from the 2023 Singapore Premier League season onwards.

=== Bhayangkara ===
On 9 November 2023, Zulfahmi join Indonesia Liga 1 club, Bhayangkara where he make his debut for the club on the same day in a league match against RANS Nusantara. He became the second singapore to play for the club since Agu Casmir in 2013. Zulfahmi is then being partnered in midfield with world class footballer, Radja Nainggolan at the club.

=== Fourth spell at Hougang United ===
On 29 October 2024, it was announced that Zulfahmi had returned to Singapore to rejoin Singapore Premier League club Hougang United for his fourth spell with the club. He will be replacing midfielder Ajay Robson who is set to be enlisted for National Service in 2025. On the same day, Zulfahmi made his return debut in a 2–1 league defeat against Albirex Niigata (S).

=== Persis Solo ===
On 14 August 2025, Zulfahmi signed with Indonesia Super League club Persis Solo. He make his debut on 16 August in a 3–0 defeat to Persija Jakarta.

== International career ==
Zulfahmi was first called up to the Singapore national team for a friendly match against Thailand on 24 August 2011. He was also part of the 2012 AFF Championship winning squad although he did not made any appearances in the competition.

Zulfahmi was handed his first international start against Laos on 10 October 2013.

Along with Hariss Harun, he has been identified by national coach Bernd Stange as the future of Singapore's midfield. Zulfahmi had also been part of the Singapore squad for the 2014 and 2016 AFF Championships.

Zulfahmi scored his first goal after 40 appearances for the Lions in a 1–1 draw with Oman on 23 March 2019, scoring a late equaliser from a free-kick in the 2019 AIRMARINE Cup.

In 2022, Zulfahmi was included in the team for the 2022 FAS Tri-Nations Series and 2022 AFF Championship.

=== Singapore Selection Squad ===
Zulfahmi was selected as part of the Singapore Selection squad for The Sultan of Selangor's Cup to be held on 6 May 2017.

== Career statistics ==
=== Club ===
As of 30 April 2024

Appearances and goals by club, season and competition
| Club | Season | League | | | National cup (Note: Includes Singapore Cup, Malaysia FA Cup, Thai FA Cup) | | League cup (Note: Includes Singapore League Cup, Malaysia Cup, Thai League Cup) | | Asia | | Total | |
| Club | Season | Division | Apps | Goals | Apps | Goals | Apps | Goals | Apps | Goals | Apps | Goals |
|---|---|---|---|---|---|---|---|---|---|---|---|---|
| Young Lions | 2010 | S.League | 12 | 0 | 2 | 0 | - | - | — | | 14 | 0 |
| Young Lions | 2011 | S.League | 23 | 1 | — | | — | | — | | 23 | 1 |
| Young Lions | 2012 | S.League | 11 | 0 | — | | 4 | 0 | — | | 15 | 0 |
| Young Lions | Total | | 46 | 1 | 2 | 0 | 4 | 0 | 0 | 0 | 52 | 1 |
| LionsXII | 2013 | Malaysia Super League | 5 | 0 | 0 | 0 | 3 | 0 | — | | 8 | 0 |
| LionsXII | 2014 | Malaysia Super League | 7 | 1 | 2 | 0 | 0 | 0 | — | | 9 | 1 |
| LionsXII | 2015 | Malaysia Super League | 0 | 0 | 0 | 0 | 0 | 0 | — | | 0 | 0 |
| LionsXII | Total | | 12 | 1 | 2 | 0 | 3 | 0 | 0 | 0 | 17 | 1 |
| Home United | 2016 | S.League | 20 | 1 | 3 | 0 | 0 | 0 | — | | 23 | 1 |
| Hougang United | 2017 | S.League | 21 | 0 | 5 | 0 | 2 | 0 | — | | 28 | 0 |
| Chonburi (on loan) | 2018 | Thai League 1 | 15 | 0 | 4 | 0 | 2 | 0 | — | | 21 | 0 |
| Hougang United | 2019 | S.League | 20 | 1 | 3 | 0 | 0 | 0 | — | | 23 | 1 |
| Suphanburi (on loan) | 2020-21 | Thai League 1 | 8 | 0 | 0 | 0 | 0 | 0 | — | | 8 | 0 |
| Samut Prakan City (on loan) | 2020-21 | Thai League 1 | 7 | 0 | 0 | 0 | 0 | 0 | — | | 7 | 0 |
| Sukhothai (on loan) | 2021-22 | Thai League 1 | 8 | 1 | 2 | 0 | 0 | 0 | — | | 10 | 1 |
| Hougang United | 2022 | S.League | 16 | 1 | 6 | 0 | 0 | 0 | 3 | 0 | 25 | 1 |
| Hougang United | 2023 | S.League | 19 | 0 | 0 | 0 | 0 | 0 | 0 | 0 | 19 | 0 |
| Hougang United | Total | | 35 | 1 | 6 | 0 | 0 | 0 | 3 | 0 | 44 | 1 |
| Bhayangkara | 2023–24 | Liga 1 | 15 | 0 | 0 | 0 | 0 | 0 | — | | 15 | 0 |
| Bhayangkara | Total | | 15 | 0 | 0 | 0 | 0 | 0 | 0 | 0 | 15 | 0 |
| Hougang United | 2024–25 | Singapore Premier League | 10 | 1 | 4 | 1 | 0 | 0 | 0 | 0 | 14 | 2 |
| Hougang United | Total | | 10 | 1 | 4 | 1 | 0 | 0 | 0 | 0 | 14 | 2 |
| Career total | | | 194 | 9 | 27 | 1 | 9 | 0 | 3 | 0 | 233 | 10 |

- Young Lions and LionsXII are ineligible for qualification to AFC competitions in their respective leagues.
- Young Lions withdrew from the 2011 and 2012 Singapore Cup, and the 2011 Singapore League Cup due to participation in AFC and AFF youth competitions.

=== International ===
==== International goals ====
As of match played 12 October 2023. Singapore score listed first, score column indicates score after each Zulfahmi goal.

International goals by date, venue, cap, opponent, score, result and competition
| No. | Date | Venue | Cap | Opponent | Score | Result | Competition |
|---|---|---|---|---|---|---|---|
| 1 | 23 March 2019 | Bukit Jalil National Stadium, Bukit Jalil, Malaysia | 40 | Oman | 1–1 | 1–1 | 2019 AIRMARINE Cup |

== Honours ==
=== Club ===
LionsXII

- Malaysia Super League: 2013

Hougang United

- Singapore Cup: 2022

=== International ===
Singapore

- AFF Championship: 2012
