= Hassan Rabia =

Omani footballer (born 1997)

Personal information
- Full name: Hassan Rabia Suwaidan Al-Hosni
- Date of birth: 1 February 1984 (age 42)
- Place of birth: Oman
- Height: 1.82 m (6 ft 0 in)
- Position: Striker

Youth career
- Majees

Senior career*
Years	Team	Apps	(Gls)
2002–2009	Majees	?	(47)
2008–2009	→ Al-Suwaiq (loan)	11	(12)
2009	→ Al-Nassr (loan)	6	(0)
2009–2010	Al-Shabab	?	(3)
2010–2011	Al-Suwaiq	?	(8)
2011–2012	Al-Shabab	?	(6)
2012–2016	Al-Suwaiq	?	(?)
2016–2019	Majees	?	(?)

International career
2008–2013	Oman	52	(17)
- * Club domestic league appearances and goals

Hassan Rabia Suwaidan Al-Hosni (Arabic: حسن ربيع سويدان الحوسني; born 1 February 1984), commonly known as Hassan Rabia, is an Omani former professional footballer.

== Club career ==
Hassan started his career with Majees SC and stayed there till 2008. He then moved on loan to Oman First Division League side Al-Suwaiq Club where he made his breakthrough in football. After a successful 19th Arabian Gulf Cup where he was the tournament's top scorer, Rabia was signed by Saudi Arabian club Al-Nassr FC of the Saudi Professional League. After his one-year loan spell at the club, he went back to Oman and signed for Al-Shabab Club. On 26 June 2012, he signed a contract with his former club Al-Suwaiq Club. On 30 September 2014, he signed a one-year contract extension with Al-Suwaiq.

== International career ==
=== Arabian Gulf Cup ===
Hassan has made appearances in the 19th Arabian Gulf Cup and the 20th Arabian Gulf Cup.

He first showed his talent during the 19th Arabian Gulf Cup, scoring a hat-trick in a 4–0 win over Iraq and a goal in the semifinals in a 1–0 win over Qatar. Hassan was awarded the "Top Goal Scorer" award of the competition with a total of four goals. He helped his team to win their first ever Arabian Gulf Cup trophy.

=== AFC Asian Cup Qualification ===
Hassan has made an appearance in the 2011 AFC Asian Cup qualification. In his only match, he scored a goal in a 1–0 win over Kuwait. Oman failed to qualify for the 2011 AFC Asian Cup.

=== FIFA World Cup Qualification ===
Hassan has made one appearance in the 2010 FIFA World Cup qualification and five appearances in the 2014 FIFA World Cup qualification.

== Career statistics ==
=== Club ===
Appearances and goals by club, season and competition
Club	Season	Division	League		Cup		Continental (Note: Includes appearances in the AFC Cup)		Other		Total	
Club	Season	Division	Apps	Goals	Apps	Goals	Apps	Goals	Apps	Goals	Apps	Goals
Majees	2005–06	Omani League	-	1	-	0	0	0	-	0	-	1
Majees	Total		-	1	-	0	0	0	-	0	-	1
Al-Suwaiq	2008–09	Oman First Division League	-	12	-	3	0	0	0	0	-	15
Al-Suwaiq	2010–11	Omani League	-	8	-	0	3	1	0	0	-	9
Al-Suwaiq	Total		-	20	-	3	3	1	0	0	-	24
Al-Shabab	2009–10	Omani League	-	3	-	1	0	0	0	0	-	4
Al-Shabab	2011–12	Oman Elite League	-	6	-	0	0	0	0	0	-	6
Al-Shabab	Total		-	9	-	1	0	0	0	0	-	10
Al-Suwaiq	2012–13	Oman Professional League	-	3	-	3	0	0	0	0	-	6
Al-Suwaiq	2013–14	Oman Professional League	-	3	-	0	2	0	0	0	-	3
Al-Suwaiq	Total		-	6	-	3	2	0	0	0	-	9
Career total			-	36	-	7	5	1	-	0	-	44

=== International ===
Scores and results list Oman's goal tally first.

List of international goals scored by Hassan Rabia
No.	Date	Venue	Opponent	Score	Result	Competition
1	10 September 2008	Royal Oman Police Stadium, Muscat, Oman	Zimbabwe		3–2	Friendly
2	14 November 2008	Royal Oman Police Stadium, Muscat, Oman	Jordan	1–0	2–0	Friendly
3	14 November 2008	Royal Oman Police Stadium, Muscat, Oman	Jordan	2–0	2–0	Friendly
4	19 December 2008	Sultan Qaboos Sports Complex, Muscat, Oman	Ecuador	1–0	2–0	Friendly
5	7 January 2009	Sultan Qaboos Sports Complex, Muscat, Oman	Iraq	1–0	4–0	19th Arabian Gulf Cup
6	7 January 2009	Sultan Qaboos Sports Complex, Muscat, Oman	Iraq	3–0	4–0	19th Arabian Gulf Cup
7	7 January 2009	Sultan Qaboos Sports Complex, Muscat, Oman	Iraq	4–0	4–0	19th Arabian Gulf Cup
8	14 January 2009	Sultan Qaboos Sports Complex, Muscat, Oman	Qatar	1–0	1–0	19th Arabian Gulf Cup
9	28 January 2009	Mohammed Al-Hamad Stadium, Hawally, Kuwait	Kuwait	1–0	1–0	2011 AFC Asian Cup qualification
10	12 August 2009	Salalah Sports Complex, Salalah, Oman	Saudi Arabia	1–0	2–1	Friendly
11	12 August 2009	Salalah Sports Complex, Salalah, Oman	Saudi Arabia	2–0	2–1	Friendly
12	9 September 2009	Jassim Bin Hamad Stadium, Doha, Qatar	Qatar	1–1	1–1	Friendly
13	3 September 2010	Saoud bin Abdulrahman Stadium, Al Wakrah, Qatar	Malaysia	1–0	3–0	Friendly
14	21 September 2010	Amman International Stadium, Amman, Jordan	Iraq	1–0	2–3	Friendly
15	8 October 2010	Seeb Stadium, Seeb, Oman	Gabon	1–0	1–0	Friendly
16	6 July 2011	Camille Chamoun Sports City Stadium, Beirut, Lebanon	Kuwait	1–0	1–1	Friendly
17	23 February 2012	Seeb Stadium, Seeb, Oman	India	4–0	5–1	Friendly

== Honours ==
=== Club ===
- With Al-Suwaiq

- Omani League (3): 2009-10, 2010–11, 2012–13
- Sultan Qaboos Cup (1): 2013
- Omani Super Cup (1): 2013; Runner-up 2011
