= Raed Ibrahim Saleh =

Omani footballer (born 1992)

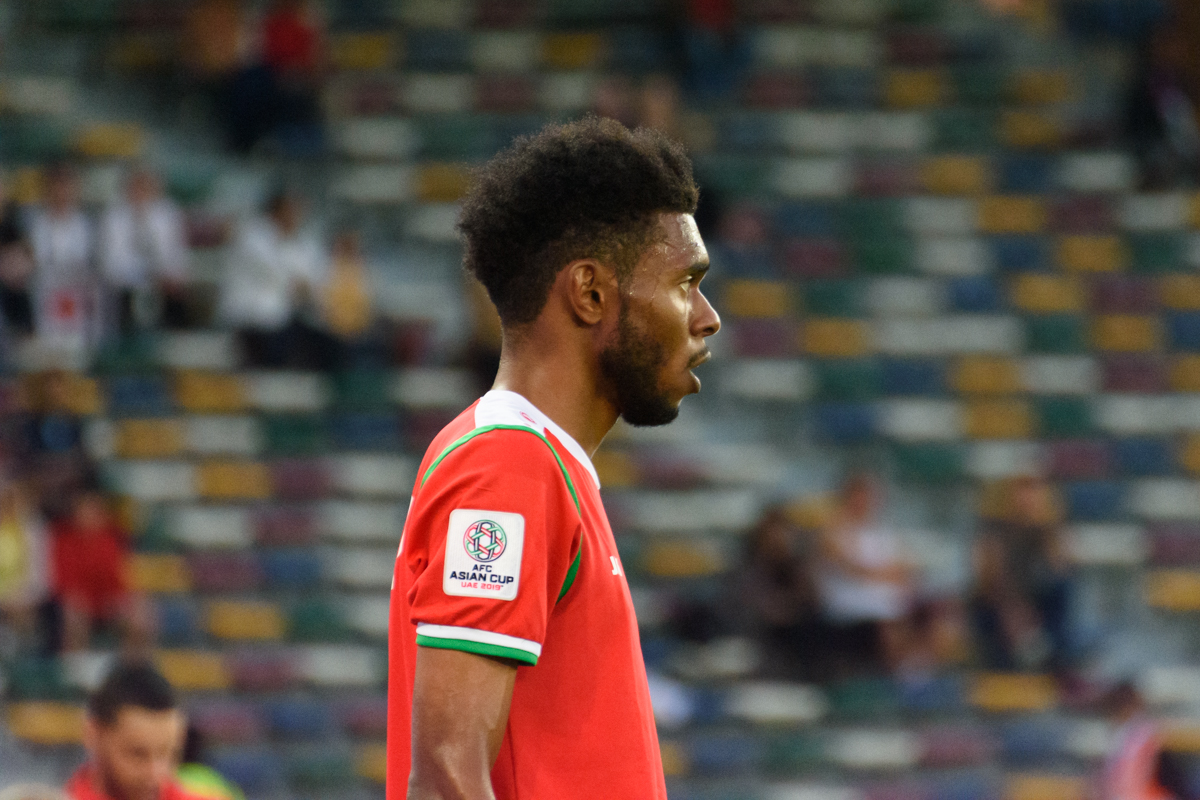
- Saleh with Oman at the 2019 AFC Asian Cup

Personal information
- Full name: Raed Ibrahim Saleh Haikal Al-Mukhaini
- Date of birth: 9 June 1992 (age 34)
- Place of birth: Salalah, Oman
- Height: 1.78 m (5 ft 10 in)
- Positions: Right midfielder; right winger; right back

Team information
- Current team: Dhofar

Youth career
- 2005–2006: Al-Tali'aa
- 2006–2007: Al-Oruba

Senior career*
Years	Team	Apps	(Gls)
2007–2013	Al-Oruba	50	(8)
2013–2017	Fanja	23	(6)
2017–2019	Valletta	40	(2)
2019–	Dhofar	0	(0)

International career^{‡}
2012–	Oman	88	(6)
- * Club domestic league appearances and goals ‡ National team caps and goals as of 23:22, 4 January 2020 (UTC)

Raed Ibrahim Saleh Haikal Al-Mukhaini (Arabic: رَائِد إِبْرَاهِيم صَالِح هَيْكَل الْمُخَيْنِيّ; born 9 June 1992), commonly known as Raed Ibrahim Saleh, is an Omani footballer who plays for Dhofar Club.

== Club career ==
Fanja SC

On 13 July 2013, he signed a contract with 2012–13 Oman Elite League runners-up Fanja SC. On 4 July 2014, he agreed a one-year contract extension with Fanja SC.

Valletta FC

On 14 July 2017, Saleh signed a two-year contract with Maltese side, Valletta FC. Making his first move to European football.

== International career ==
Raed is part of the first team squad of the Oman national football team. He was selected for the national team for the first time in 2012. He made his first appearance for Oman on 11 September 2012 in a friendly match against Ireland. He has made appearances in the 2014 FIFA World Cup qualification, the 21st Arabian Gulf Cup, the 2014 WAFF Championship and the 2015 AFC Asian Cup qualification.

== Career statistics ==
=== Club ===
Club	Season	Division	League		Cup		Continental (Note: Includes appearances in the AFC Cup)		Other		Total	
Club	Season	Division	Apps	Goals	Apps	Goals	Apps	Goals	Apps	Goals	Apps	Goals
Al-Oruba	2011–12	Oman Elite League	-	4	-	0	2	0	-	0	-	4
Al-Oruba	2012–13	Oman Elite League	-	4	-	1	0	0	-	0	-	5
Al-Oruba	Total		-	8	-	1	2	0	-	0	-	9
Fanja	2013–14	Oman Professional League	-	6	-	0	6	0	-	0	-	6
Fanja	Total		-	6	-	0	6	0	-	0	-	6
Career total			-	14	-	1	8	0	-	0	-	15

=== International ===
Scores and results list Oman's goal tally first.

#	Date	Venue	Opponent	Score	Result	Competition
1.	10 October 2014	Sohar Regional Sports Complex, Sohar, Oman	Costa Rica	1–1	3–4	Friendly
2.	23 November 2014	King Fahd International Stadium, Riyadh, Saudi Arabia	Qatar	1–0	1–3	22nd Arabian Gulf Cup
3.	3 September 2015	Al-Seeb Stadium, Seeb, Oman	Turkmenistan	1–0	3–1	2018 FIFA World Cup qualification
4.	14 November 2017	Changlimithang Stadium, Thimphu, Bhutan	Bhutan	2–1	4–2	2019 AFC Asian Cup qualification
5.	13 October 2018	Thani bin Jassim Stadium, Al Rayyan, Qatar	Philippines	1–0	1–1	Friendly
6.	20 March 2019	Bukit Jalil National Stadium, Kuala Lumpur, Malaysia	Afghanistan	2–0	5–0	2019 Airmarine Cup

== Honours ==
Al-Oruba

- Oman Super Cup: 2011

Fanja

- Oman Professional League runner-up: 2013–14
- Sultan Qaboos Cup: 2013–14
- Oman Professional League Cup: 2014–15
- Oman Super Cup runner-up: 2013, 2014
