= Mohamed Khasib =

Omani footballer (born 1994)

Personal information
- Full name: Mohamed Khasib Sulaiyam Al-Hosni
- Date of birth: 24 March 1994 (age 32)
- Height: 1.68 m (5 ft 6 in)
- Positions: Midfielder; forward

Team information
- Current team: Al-Nahda
- Number: 66

Senior career*
Years	Team	Apps	(Gls)
2014–	Al-Nahda		

International career^{‡}
2018–	Oman	2	(0)
- * Club domestic league appearances and goals ‡ National team caps and goals as of 17 January 2019

Mohamed Khasib Sulaiyam Al-Hosni (Arabic: محمد خصيب سليم الحوسني; born 24 March 1994), commonly known as Mohamed Khasib, is an Omani footballer who plays for Al-Nahda in Oman Professional League and the Oman national football team as a midfielder or forward.

== Career ==
=== International ===
Khasib made his debut for Oman national football team in a friendly match on 16 December 2018 against Tajikistan. He was included in Oman's squad for the 2019 AFC Asian Cup in the United Arab Emirates.

== Career statistics ==
=== International ===
Statistics accurate as of match played 17 January 2019

Oman national team
Year	Apps	Goals
2018	1	0
2019	1	0
Total	2	0
