= 19th Arabian Gulf Cup =

International football tournament in 2009

'الخلیج العربي Kass Al-Khaleej Al-Arabi, or Khaleeji 19
- 19th Arabian Gulf Cup official logo

Tournament details
- Host country: Oman
- Dates: 4–17 January
- Teams: 8
- Venues: 2 (in 1 host city)

Final positions
- Champions: Oman (1st title)
- Runners-up: Saudi Arabia

Tournament statistics
- Matches played: 15
- Goals scored: 31 (2.07 per match)
- Top scorer: (Oman) Hassan Rabia (4 goals)
- Best player: (Saudi Arabia) Majed Al-Marshedi
- Best goalkeeper: (Oman) Ali Al-Habsi

The 19th Arabian Gulf Cup (Arabic: كأس الخليج العربي) was the nineteenth edition of the biannual Gulf Cup competition. It took place in Muscat, Oman, from 4 to 17 January 2009, with Oman emerging as the winner for the first time in its history, following a penalty shootout against regional rivals Saudi Arabia.

The 19th Arabian Gulf Cup marked a milestone in the competition when it was broadcast for the first time in HD, and featured virtual graphics, such as distance between free kick barrier and the goal, 9.15 m circle for free-kicks, and off-side line detection with help from Al-Jazeera Sports. Many praised Al-Jazeera for their excellent coverage of the competition, noting that the camerawork was very similar to UEFA Euro 2008.

== The postponing of the competition ==
The 19th Arabian Gulf Cup was originally planned out to be held in 2008, but due to Cyclone Gonu damaging Muscat six months before the planned time of the event, it was then postponed to early 2009.

== Teams ==
8 teams participated in the tournament.

- Oman (Host)
- United Arab Emirates (Holder)
- Bahrain
- Iraq
- Kuwait
- Qatar
- Saudi Arabia
- Yemen

== Draw ==
- The draw was held in Oman on 29 October 2008.
- Eight teams were divided into two groups, Oman (The host nation) was in group A, The UAE (The holder) in group B, while the rest of the teams were placed in a pot based in October 2008's FIFA ranking.
- Oman played the opening match at Sultan Qaboos Sports Complex.

=== Seedings ===
Pot	National Team	FIFA Ranking
A	Oman (Host)	96
A	United Arab Emirates (Holder)	110
B	Saudi Arabia	48
B	Bahrain	80
C	Iraq	72
C	Qatar	84
D	Kuwait	127
D	Yemen	145

== Venues ==
Muscat	Muscat
Sultan Qaboos Sports Complex	Royal Oman Police Stadium
Capacity: 39,000	Capacity: 15,000

== Matches ==
=== Group A ===
Team	Pld	W	D	L	GF	GA	GD	Pts
Oman	3	2	1	0	6	0	+6	7
Kuwait	3	1	2	0	2	1	+1	5
Bahrain	3	1	0	2	3	4	−1	3
Iraq	3	0	1	2	2	8	−6	1

4 January 2009

Oman	0–0	Kuwait

Sultan Qaboos Sports Complex, Muscat
4 January 2009

Bahrain	3–1	Iraq
Yaser 28'; Adnan 69' (pen.); Al-Dakeel 90+2'		Mahmoud 81' (pen.)

Sultan Qaboos Sports Complex, Muscat

7 January 2009

Iraq	0–4	Oman
		H. Rabia 23', 65', 79'; Al-Hosni 50'

Sultan Qaboos Sports Complex, Muscat
7 January 2009

Bahrain	0–1	Kuwait
		Neda 28'

Sultan Qaboos Sports Complex, Muscat

10 January 2009

Oman	2–0	Bahrain
Al-Maimani 14'; Bashir 71'

Sultan Qaboos Sports Complex, Muscat
10 January 2009

Iraq	1–1	Kuwait
Abdul-Zahra 66'		Khalaf 37'

Royal Oman Police Stadium, Muscat

=== Group B ===
Team	Pld	W	D	L	GF	GA	GD	Pts
Saudi Arabia	3	2	1	0	9	0	+9	7
Qatar	3	1	2	0	2	1	+1	5
United Arab Emirates	3	1	1	1	3	4	−1	4
Yemen	3	0	0	3	2	11	−9	0

5 January 2009

United Arab Emirates	3–1	Yemen
M. Omar 6' (pen.); Al-Hammadi 14'; Al-Shehhi 67'		Al-Nono 90+1'

Royal Oman Police Stadium, Muscat
5 January 2009

Saudi Arabia	0–0	Qatar

Royal Oman Police Stadium, Muscat

8 January 2009

Qatar	0–0	United Arab Emirates

Royal Oman Police Stadium, Muscat
8 January 2009

Saudi Arabia	6–0	Yemen
Al-Qahtani 4'; Mouath 11', 83'; Shuhail 18'; Otaif 19'; Al-Mousa 36'

Royal Oman Police Stadium, Muscat

11 January 2009

Qatar	2–1	Yemen
Haroon 13'; Siddiq 90+8'		Al-Nono 31'

Royal Oman Police Stadium, Muscat
11 January 2009

United Arab Emirates	0–3	Saudi Arabia
		Al-Qahtani 58'; Al-Zori 70'; Al-Fraidi 72'

Sultan Qaboos Sports Complex, Muscat

=== Semi finals ===
14 January 2009
18:00 UTC+4

Oman	1–0	Qatar
H. Rabia 18'

Sultan Qaboos Sports Complex, Muscat
14 January 2009
21:00 UTC+4

Kuwait	0–1	Saudi Arabia
		Al-Fraidi 63'

Sultan Qaboos Sports Complex, Muscat

=== Final ===
17 January 2009
18:00 UTC+4

Oman	0–0 (a.e.t.)	Saudi Arabia
Penalties
Ayil (penalty scored); Al-Ajmi (penalty scored); Mudhafar (penalty scored); Saleh (penalty scored); Bashir (penalty scored); M. Rabia (penalty scored)	6–5	(penalty scored) Al-Qahtani; (penalty scored) Khariri; (penalty scored) Tukar; (penalty scored) Otaif; (penalty scored) Hawsawi; (penalty missed) Al-Jassim

Sultan Qaboos Sports Complex, Muscat

== Winners ==
19th Arabian Gulf Cup winners

Oman
First title

== Goalscorers ==
4 goals

- (Oman) Hassan Rabia

2 goals

- (Saudi Arabia) Malek Mouath
- (Saudi Arabia) Yasser Al-Qahtani
- (Saudi Arabia) Ahmed Al-Fraidi
- (Yemen) Ali Al Nono

1 goal

- (Bahrain) Abdullah Al-Dakheel
- (Bahrain) Abdullah Omar
- (Bahrain) Sayed Mohamed Adnan
- (Iraq) Alaa Abdul-Zahra
- (Iraq) Younis Mahmoud
- (Saudi Arabia) Abdullah Al-Zori

1 goal (cont.)

- (Saudi Arabia) Abdullah Shuhail
- (Saudi Arabia) Ahmed Al-Mousa
- (Saudi Arabia) Ahmed Otaif
- (Kuwait) Khaled Khalaf
- (Kuwait) Musaed Neda
- (Oman) Badar Al-Maimani
- (Oman) Imad Al-Hosni
- (Oman) Fawzi Bashir
- (Qatar) Majdi Siddiq
- (Qatar) Musa Haroon
- (United Arab Emirates) Mohammed Omar
- (United Arab Emirates) Ismail Al-Hammadi
- (United Arab Emirates) Mohamed Al-Shehhi

== Team statistics ==
This table shows all team performance.

Pos	Team	Pld	W	D	L	GF	GA	GD
Final phase
1	Oman	5	3	2	0	7	0	+7
2	Saudi Arabia	5	3	2	0	10	0	+10
3	Kuwait	4	1	2	1	2	2	0
3	Qatar	4	1	2	1	2	2	0
Eliminated in the group stage
5	United Arab Emirates	3	1	1	1	3	4	–1
6	Bahrain	3	1	0	2	3	4	–1
7	Iraq	3	0	1	2	2	8	–6
8	Yemen	3	0	0	3	2	11	–9

== Total goals by team ==
10 goals

- Saudi Arabia

7 goals

- Oman

3 goals

- Bahrain
- United Arab Emirates

2 goals

- Iraq
- Kuwait
- Qatar
- Yemen

== Trivia ==
- FIFA president Sepp Blatter came to Oman for the second time, and attended the Oman/Qatar, and the Saudi Arabia/Kuwait games.
- UEFA president, and French football legend, Michel Platini attended the Oman/Kuwait, and the Bahrain/Iraq games, both in the Sultan Qaboos Sports Complex.
- Singer Mohammed Abdo attended the final match between Oman and his native, Saudi Arabia.
- The Tournament took place during the Israeli bombardment of Gaza, also known as the Gaza War, as a sign of solidarity toward the Palestinians, many fans waved pro-Palestinian banners and chanted pro-Palestinian slogans. Omani footballer Badr Al-Maimani also revealed a pro-Gaza undershirt after his free-kick goal against Bahrain. Also before the opening match played by Yemen, players wore shirts representing solidarity with Palestine. The Kuwaiti team also did the same in their opening match against Oman, but instead wore scarves.
